= Wingatui =

Settlement in Otago, New Zealand

- Settlement
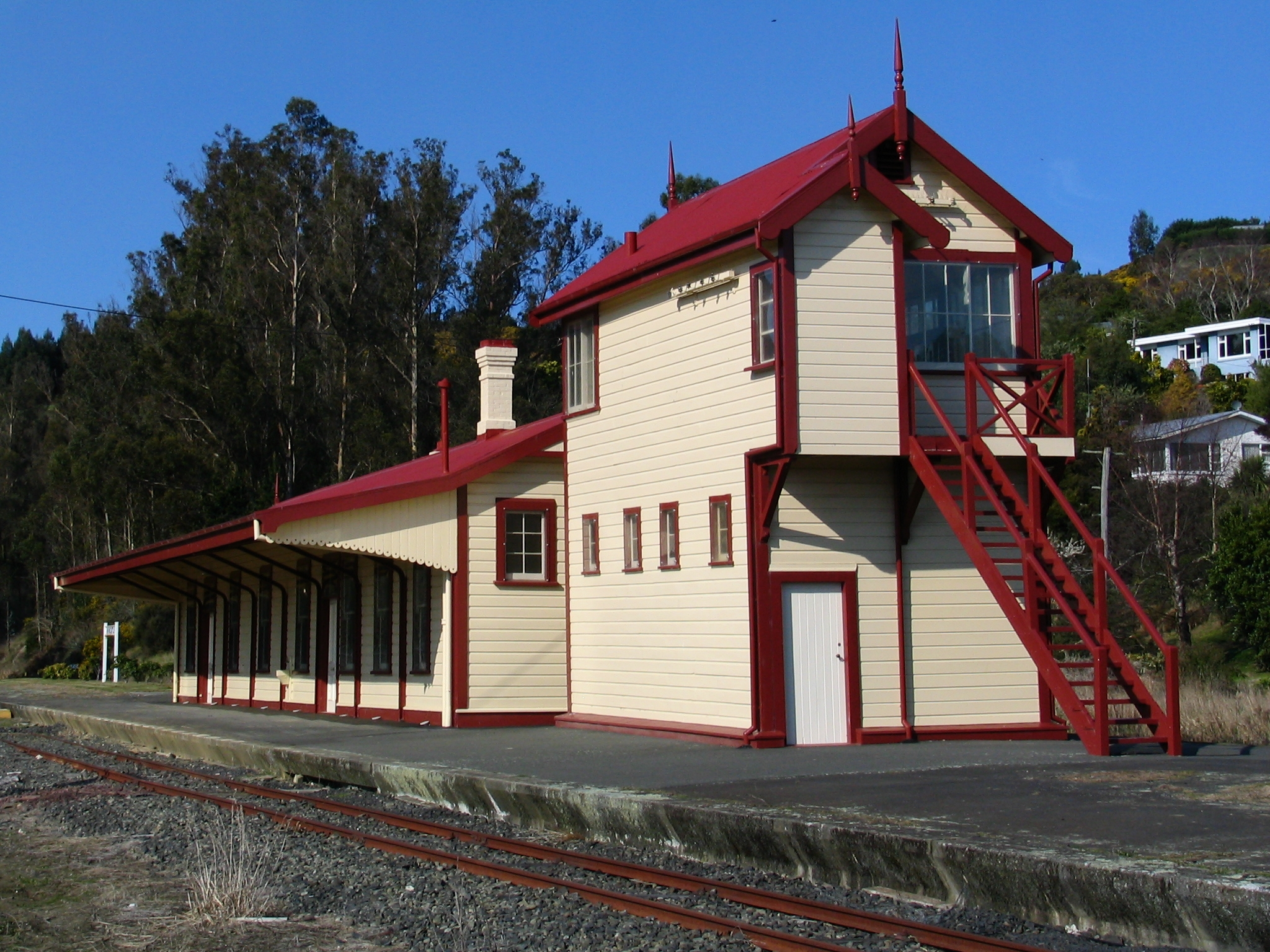
- Wingatui Railway Station and Signal Box
- Interactive map of Wingatui
- Coordinates: 45.877°S 170.385°E
- Country: New Zealand
- Island: South Island
- Region: Otago
- District: Dunedin
- Community board: Mosgiel-Taieri Community Board
- Electorates: Taieri; Te Tai Tonga (Māori)

Government
  - Territorial authority: Dunedin City Council
  - Regional council: Otago Regional Council
  - Mayor of Dunedin: Sophie Barker
  - Taieri MP: Ingrid Leary
  - Te Tai Tonga MP: Tākuta Ferris

Area
  - Total: 6.84 km^{2} (2.64 sq mi)

Population (June 2025)
  - Total: 950
  - Density: 140/km^{2} (360/sq mi)
- Time zone: UTC+12 (NZST)
  - Summer (DST): UTC+13 (NZDT)
- Area code: 03
- Local iwi: Ngāi Tahu

Wingatui is a small settlement almost 15 kilometres west of Dunedin, and two kilometres east of Mosgiel. It has become a suburb of Mosgiel, but continues to maintain its own unique identity and heritage.

Known primarily for the historic Wingatui railway station and for the Wingatui Racecourse, Wingatui is home to a population of 950 as of June 2025.

Wingatui is one of the principal stops on the Taieri Gorge Railway, and is also the entrance point to the currently defunct Chain Hills Tunnel single track rail tunnel, which links Wingatui with the Dunedin suburb of Abbotsford to the east. Construction of the railway at Wingatui began in 1879. Local action groups are working with the Dunedin City Council in assessing the possibility of refurbishing and re-opening the disused tunnel to cycle and pedestrian traffic.

Wingatui is home to several lifestyle blocks, the owners of many of which keep horses and are associated with the horse racing industry. On race days, trains from Dunedin are known to carry several hundred racegoers through to Wingatui railway station for races.

== Name ==
A popular myth ascribes the township's name to a bird-shooting incident involving the wounding of a tūī by newly-arrived settler William Stevenson, described by A.W. Reed as "surely apocryphal" and that the name might be a contraction of whiringatua - "place of the plaiting of straps" or uingatui - "what the tui said", a reference to training tui to talk, or whiringa-a-tau - grey warbler.

== Demographics ==
Wingatui covers 6.84 km^{2} (2.64 sq mi) and had an estimated population of 950 as of June 2025, with a population density of 139 people per km^{2}.

Historical population
Year	Pop.	±% p.a.
2006	708	—
2013	765	+1.11%
2018	891	+3.10%

Wingatui had a population of 891 at the 2018 New Zealand census, an increase of 126 people (16.5%) since the 2013 census, and an increase of 183 people (25.8%) since the 2006 census. There were 315 households, comprising 441 males and 450 females, giving a sex ratio of 0.98 males per female. The median age was 43.9 years (compared with 37.4 years nationally), with 162 people (18.2%) aged under 15 years, 153 (17.2%) aged 15 to 29, 444 (49.8%) aged 30 to 64, and 135 (15.2%) aged 65 or older.

Ethnicities were 93.3% European/Pākehā, 9.1% Māori, 1.3% Pasifika, 2.0% Asian, and 2.4% other ethnicities. People may identify with more than one ethnicity.

The percentage of people born overseas was 12.8, compared with 27.1% nationally.

Although some people chose not to answer the census's question about religious affiliation, 57.9% had no religion, 35.4% were Christian, 0.3% were Hindu and 1.7% had other religions.

Of those at least 15 years old, 135 (18.5%) people had a bachelor's or higher degree, and 150 (20.6%) people had no formal qualifications. The median income was $38,700, compared with $31,800 nationally. 153 people (21.0%) earned over $70,000 compared to 17.2% nationally. The employment status of those at least 15 was that 408 (56.0%) people were employed full-time, 120 (16.5%) were part-time, and 9 (1.2%) were unemployed.

== Notable residents ==
- Brian J. Anderton (ONZM) - New Zealand Racing Hall of Fame jockey, trainer, and breeder. Biography published 2013.
- Hector A. Anderton - Three-time champion horse trainer. (Father of Brian)
- Midge Didham - 1970 Melbourne Cup winning jockey (Baghdad Note)
- Bob Heasley - Winning trainer, 1970 Melbourne Cup with (Baghdad Note)
- Show Gate - New Zealand Horse of the Year 1975 and 1977 (First dual winner of this title) - won 30 of her 51 starts.Bred and owned by Gordon Thomson who lived in Janefield, Wingatui
- R.J. (Bob) Skelton MBE - Premiership winning jockey, nine times. Melbourne Cup winner on Van der Hum. Rode Great Sensation to 3 consecutive Wellington Cup wins. New Zealand Sports Hall of Fame inductee, and New Zealand Racing Hall of Fame member. Resident Jockey at stables of Hector A Anderton. Became Anderton's son-in-law.

== See also ==
- Thoroughbred racing in New Zealand
