= Castletown (horse) =

New Zealand-bred Thoroughbred racehorse

- Sire: One Pound Sterling
- Grandsire: Sovereign Path
- Dam: Mona Curragh
- Damsire: Levmoss
- Sex: Gelding
- Foaled: 3 October 1986
- Died: 17 December 2017 (aged 31)
- Country: New Zealand
- Colour: Bay
- Breeder: B J McCahill
- Owner: P M Bussuttin, B J McCahill & K P Morris
- Trainer: Patrick Bussuttin
- Record: 103:16–9–11
- Earnings: $2,467,761

Major wins
- New Zealand Derby (1989); Wellington Cup (1991, 1992, 1994); Auckland Cup (1992); Kelt Capital Stakes (1991); Caulfield Stakes (1992); Trentham Stakes (1991, 1992, 1993)

Honours
- New Zealand Racing Hall of Fame (2014)
- Last updated on 22 October 2009

Castletown (3 October 1986 – 17 December 2017) was a New Zealand thoroughbred racehorse who won over $2 million in prize money and is best known for winning one of New Zealand's toughest staying tests, the Wellington Cup, on three occasions.

He had over 100 starts, from two to eight years of age, including a record 13 races over 3,200 metres, a distance at which he excelled.

Over the distance, he won the Wellington Cup in 1991, 1992, and 1994, and the Auckland Cup in 1992. In his third win in the Wellington Cup, Castletown carried topweight of 58 kilograms, and won a special place in New Zealand racing history, accompanied by the memorable "the dream bursts into reality" commentary from Tony Lee.

Castletown could also be effective over shorter distances, especially earlier in his career, where highlights included wins in the New Zealand Derby, the Kelt Capital Stakes, and the Caulfield Stakes, and he was placed in stakes races as short as 1,600 metres.

In Australia, he contested the Caulfield and Melbourne Cups three years in-a-row, from 1991 to 1993, and was placed in the Sydney Cup in 1991 and 1992.

He failed to recapture his best form after his last Wellington Cup, and ran his last race in November 1994. He died in December 2017.

== Race record ==
Notable races included:

- 3rd in the 1988 New Zealand 2000 Guineas behind Finnegan Fox and Centime.
- 1st in the 1989 New Zealand Derby beating Renteeno and Just A Dancer.
- 2nd in the 1990 Air New Zealand Stakes behind Riverina Charm.
- 3rd in the 1990 DB Draught Classic behind Horlicks and The Phantom.
- 4th in the 1990 Canterbury Guineas
- 4th in the 1990 Rosehill Guineas
- 4th in the 1990 AJC Derby
- 3rd in the 1990 Queensland Guineas
- 3rd in the 1990 Queensland Derby behind Rough Habit and Ray’s Hope.
- 2nd in the 1990 Avondale Cup behind Coconut Ice.
- 1st in the 1990 Queen Elizabeth Handicap (Ellerslie, 2400m) ahead of Coconut Ice and Our Caddy.
- 4th in the 1991 Auckland Cup won by Star Harvest.
- 1st in the 1991 Trentham Stakes from Shuzohra and Madame Bardot.
- 1st in the 1991 Wellington Cup from Shuzohra and Coconut Ice.
- 3rd in the 1991 The BMW behind Dr Grace and Shuzohra.
- 2nd in the 1991 Sydney Cup behind Just A Dancer.
- 1st in the 1991 AJC St Leger Stakes from Just A Dancer and Cool Reception.
- 1st in the 1991 Kelt Capital Stakes ahead of Surfers Paradise and Megabucks.
- 6th in the 1991 Caulfield Stakes won by Shaftesbury Avenue.
- 5th in the 1991 Caulfield Cup won by Let’s Elope.
- 5th in the 1991 Mackinnon Stakes won by Let’s Elope.
- 9th in the 1991 Melbourne Cup won by Let’s Elope.
- 1st in the 1992 Auckland Cup from Lurestina and Cool Reception.
- 1st in the 1992 Trentham Stakes ahead of Carlton King and Embroidered.
- 1st in the 1992 Wellington Cup ahead of Schnapps and The Yapper.
- 3rd in the 1992 Sydney Cup behind Eagle Eye and Aquidity.
- 1st in the 1992 Caulfield Stakes (2000m) beating Heroicity and Ramyah.
- 7th in the 1992 Caulfield Cup won by Mannerism, second was Veandercross.
- 3rd in the 1992 Melbourne Cup won by Subzero, second was Veandercross.
- 1st in the 1993 Trentham Stakes ahead of Tall Emperor and Beowulf.
- 10th in the 1993 Wellington Cup won by Dancing Lord.
- 3rd in the 1993 Kelt Capital Stakes behind Calm Harbour and Solvit.
- 8th in the 1993 Caulfield Cup won by Fraar.
- 10th in the 1993 Melbourne Cup won by Vintage Crop.
- 3rd in the 1993 New Zealand Cup behind Karaoke and Prince Haze.
- 1st in the 1994 Wellington Cup from Tawbeau and Ultimate Aim.

== See also ==
- Thoroughbred racing in New Zealand
- Repeat winners of horse races
