= So Casual =

New Zealand-bred Thoroughbred racehorse

- Sire: Casual Lies
- Grandsire: Lear Fan
- Dam: Some Reason
- Damsire: Sound Reason
- Sex: Gelding
- Foaled: 25 October 1995
- Country: New Zealand
- Colour: Bay
- Breeder: C J T & Mrs G Davison & Mrs J M Wilding
- Owner: G C P & Mrs M H Beadel, D F & Mrs M D Bodle, C J T & Mrs G Davison
- Trainer: Ross Taylor
- Record: 22:9-5-3
- Earnings: $448,375

Major wins
- New Zealand Derby (1998); Hawke's Bay Guineas (1998)
- Last updated on July 3, 2007

So Casual (foaled 25 October 1995) is a Thoroughbred racehorse who won the New Zealand Derby in record time in 1998.

Although not the star in his two-year-old year, So Casual ran extremely well in his first season of racing and never finished further back than third. Ridden by Catherine Hutchinson, he ran second in two 1400m Group 1 races behind:

- Happyanunoit in the Manawatu Sires Produce Stakes.
- Zola in the Ellerslie Sires Produce Stakes.

Earlier he was 3rd behind Alf and So Explicit in the 1200m listed FAI NZ Magic Millions Classic at Trentham, ridden by Reese Jones.

He resumed in his three-year-old season and kept his perfect record of being in the first three at every start as he finished:

- 1st in a 1200m 3YO race at Taupo ridden by Vinnie Colgan.
- 1st in the 1400m Group 3 Hawke's Bay Guineas from Danske and Mr Jif (Colgan).
- 3rd in the 1600m G2 Lindauer Guineas to Danske and Light Opera.
- 1st in the 1600m listed Coruba Rum Canterbury Stakes beating Morgan Glory and Lang Syne.
- 2nd in the G1 1600m New Zealand 2000 Guineas to Danske, ahead of Power And Fame.
- 3rd in the 2000m G2 Avondale Guineas to Kelt Capital Stakes winner Just Call Me Sir and Nahayan. He was ridden by Tony Allan.

But in the Derby he finally got his well-deserved first major win, and he made up for lost time with an extraordinary performance. Ridden by Australian jockey Damien Oliver, So Casual turned the tables on all who had narrowly beaten him to date by winning the Derby in a time of 2:24.80, a track and national record for 2400m (12 furlongs) that still stands 9 years later.

Struggling with soundness after his Derby win, So Casual didn't often show his best in subsequent starts, although he did return to the winners' circle at Ellerslie in:

- the 1400m Easter Trial in March 1999 (Michael Coleman), beating Straight Back and Trounced.
- the 1600m G3 King's Plate on Boxing Day 1999, over Integrate and Tall Poppy.

He returned to racing after a two-year injury-enforced layoff winning his first start on New Years Day 2002 at Hastings. After being unplaced in the Thorndon Mile he showed promise in three 1600m races in February and March including a 4th in the G3 Thompson Handicap. But after a failure in the Awapuni Gold Cup he was retired.

== See also ==
- Thoroughbred racing in New Zealand
