= Thoroughbred racing in New Zealand =

Horse racing in New Zealand

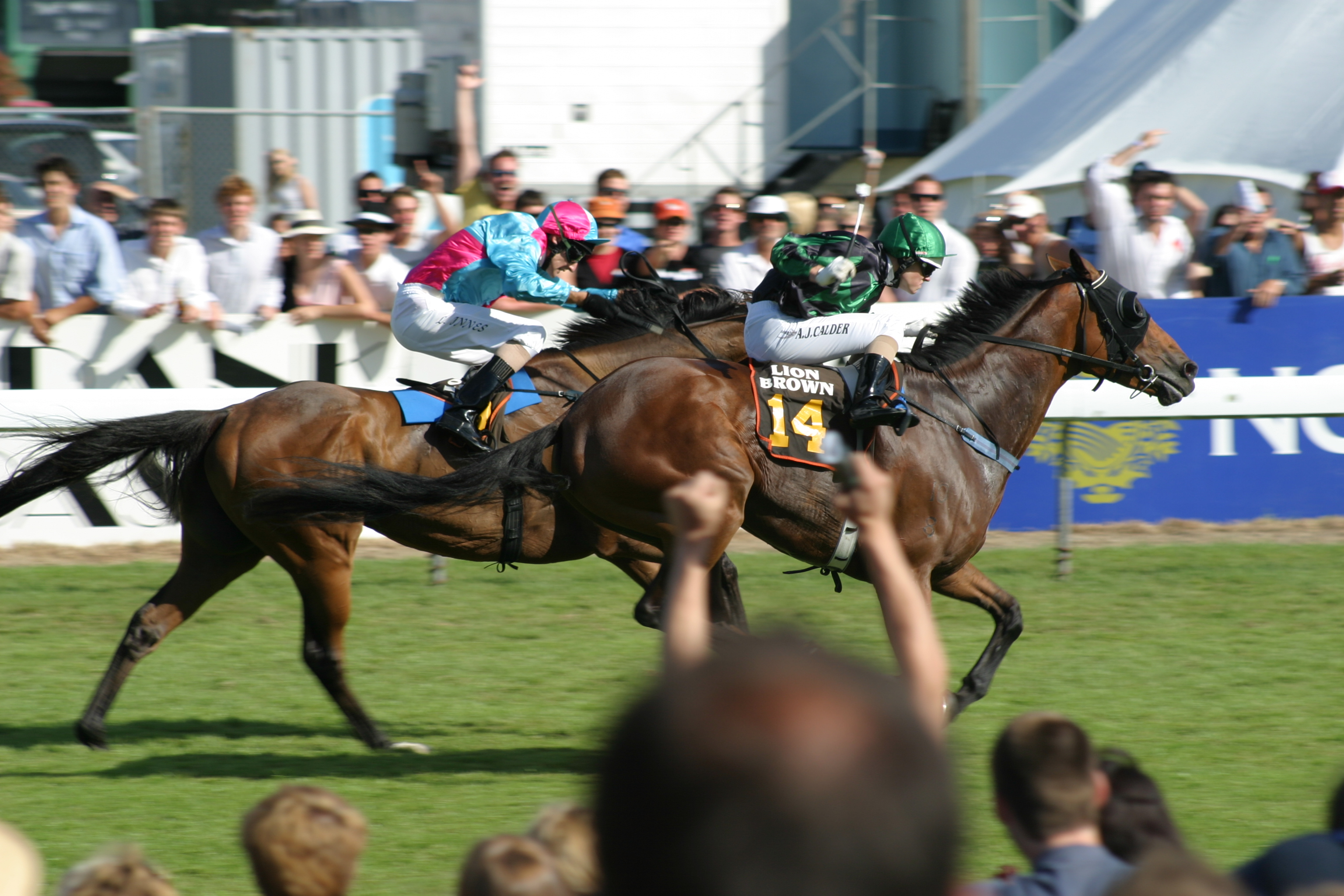
Wellington Cup race in New Zealand

The racing of Thoroughbred horses (or gallopers, as they are also known) is a popular gaming and spectator sport and industry in New Zealand.

== History ==
Thoroughbred horse racing commenced soon after European settlement. The first totalisator machine in the world was installed at Ellerslie Racecourse in 1913, (see Sir George Julius).

Thoroughbred racing with the associated aspects such as horse breeding, training and care, race betting, race-day management and entertainment has gradually developed into an industry worth billions of dollars. The governing body is the New Zealand Thoroughbred Racing Incorporated.

== Race clubs and courses of New Zealand ==
Thoroughbred racing is held throughout New Zealand, including courses in some of the smaller centres.

Club	Course, Town/city/province	Track	Direction	Straight	Notes
Ashburton RC	Ashburton, New Zealand	1876m	left-handed	382m	
Auckland RC	Ellerslie Racecourse, Auckland	1876m	right-handed	382m	
Avondale JC	Avondale Racecourse, Auckland	1800m	right-handed	450m	
Banks Peninsula RC	Motukarara, Canterbury	1800m	left-handed	400m	
Beaumont RC	Wingatui, Dunedin (since 1987)	2000m	left-handed	350m	Part of Gallop South
Cambridge RC	Te Rapa, Hamilton	1800m	left-handed	420m	NZ's first synthetic track in 2020
Canterbury JC	Riccarton Park, Christchurch	2400m	left-handed	400m	Includes a synthetic track
Central Otago RC	Omakau	1600m	left-handed	300m	Part of Gallop South. Formerly the Vincent Jockey Club
Counties RC	Pukekohe Park, Franklin	1900m	right-handed	520m	
Dargaville RC	Awakino Point	1600m	left-handed	350m	Was 1 meeting per year, in November. Last held in 2016.
Egmont RC	Hawera	1822m	left-handed	350m	
Feilding JC	Awapuni, Palmerston North	1700m	left-handed	350m	Part of RACE
Foxton RC	Previously raced at Foxton, Horowhenua	1811m	left-handed	349m	Trials only. No Raceday meetings being held
Gore RC	Gore, Southland	1600m	left-handed	350m	Part of Gallop South
Greymouth JC	Omoto, West Coast, South Island	1200m	left-handed	250m	
Hawkes Bay Racing Inc	Hastings	1700m	left-handed	375m	
Kumara RC	Kumara, West Coast	1500m	left-handed	300m	1 meeting per year, in January
Kurow JC	Kurow, North Otago	1600m	left-handed	350m	1 meeting per year, late December
Levin RC	Ōtaki, Horowhenua	1800m	left-handed	400m	
Manawatu RC	Awapuni, Palmerston North	1700m	left-handed	350m	Part of RACE Includes a synthetic track
Marlborough RC	Waterlea, Blenheim	1700m	left-handed	300m	
Marton JC	Awapuni, Palmerston North	1700m	left-handed	350m	Part of RACE
Masterton RC	Tauherenikau Racecourse, near Featherston, Wairarapa	1810m	left-handed	315m	1 meeting per year, in March
Matamata RC	Matamata	1628m	left-handed	400m	
Oamaru JC	Oamaru, North Otago	1800m	left-handed	350m	
Otago RC	Wingatui & Cromwell	2000m & 1600m	left-handed both	350m both	
Otaki-Maori RC	Ōtaki, Horowhenua	1800m	left handed	400m	the sole surviving Maori club in New Zealand
Pakuranga Hunt	Ellerslie Racecourse	1876m	right-handed	382m	the feature event is the Pakuranga Hunt Steeplechase in August
Poverty Bay Turf Club	Ashwood Park, Gisborne	1800m	left-handed	400m	
Rangitikei RC	Awapuni, Palmerston North	1700m	left-handed	350m	Part of RACE
Reefton JC	Reefton	1140m	left handed	230m	the smallest galloping track in New Zealand. 1 meeting in January
Riverton RC	Riverton, near Invercargill	1650m	left-handed	400m	Part of Gallop South
Racing Rotorua	Arawa Park, Rotorua	1600m	left-handed	300m	
Rotorua & Bay of Plenty Hunt	Arawa Park, Rotorua	1600m	left-handed	300m	1 meeting per year, held in September
South Canterbury RC	Phar Lap raceway, Timaru	1800m	left-handed	400m	
South Waikato RC	Matamata	1628m	left-handed	400m	1 meeting per year, held in March
Southland RC	Ascot Park, Invercargill	1800m	left-handed	215m	The southern-most course in New Zealand
Stratford RC	Te Kapua, Stratford	1600m	left-handed	400m	1 meeting per year, held in late December. No meeting from the 2019/20 season on.
Tapanui RC	Wingatui, Dunedin	2000m	left-handed	350m	1 meeting per year, held in December. Part of Gallop South
Taranaki Racing Inc	New Plymouth	1600m	left-handed	375m	
Taumarunui	Arawa Park, Rotorua	1600m	left-handed	300m	1 meeting per year, held in July
Racing Taupo	Centennial Park, Taupō	1600m	left-handed	320m	Part of TRAC
Racing Tauranga	Tauranga	1800m	right-handed	350m	Part of TRAC
Racing Te Aroha	Te Aroha	1900m	right-handed	500m	Part of TRAC
Thames JC	Te Aroha	1900m	right handed	500m	1 meeting per year, early January. Part of TRAC
Waikato RC	Te Rapa, Hamilton	1800m	left-handed	420m	
Waikouaiti RC	Waikouaiti, 30 km north of Dunedin	1550m	left-handed	350m	1 meeting per year, held on New Year's Day
Waimate RC	From 2020 at Phar Lap, Timaru. Historically at Waimate	1800m / (1550m)	Left-handed	400m/(250m)	1 meeting per year. Last meeting at Waimate course 9/6/2019
Waipa RC	Te Awamutu	1650m	Right-handed	300m	
Waipukurau JC	Waipukurau, Central Hawkes Bay	1800m	left-handed	450m	2 meetings per year, held in December and March
Wairarapa RC	Tauherenikau Racecourse, near Featherston, Wairarapa	1810m	left-handed	315m	
Wairio JC	Ascot Park, Invercargill	1800m	left-handed	215m	1 meeting in May
Wairoa RC	Te Kupenga	1660m	left-handed	245m	2 meetings in February
Wanganui JC	Whanganui	1650m	left-handed	325m	sand based track
Waverley RC	Waverley	1800m	left-handed	375m	
Wellington Racing Club	Trentham Racecourse, Upper Hutt	2000m	left-handed	450m	Part of RACE
Westland RC	Hokitika	1290m	right-handed	340m	1 meeting per year, only right handed track in the South Island
Whakatane RC	Te Teko, Whakatāne	1800m	right-handed	420m	2 meetings per year
Whangarei RC	Ruakaka, 30 km south of Whangārei	1800m	right-handed	400m	
Winton JC	Winton and Ascot Park	1786m	Left-handed	270m	Part of Gallop South
Woodville-Pahiatua RC	Woodville	1800m	left-handed	375m	
Wyndham RC	Gore, Southland	1600m	left-handed	350m	1 meeting per year, held in March

== Major thoroughbred horse races in New Zealand ==
Race	Group	Type	Location	Distance	Notable winners
Proisir Plate	1	Weight for Age	Ellerslie Racecourse, previously Hastings	1400m	Callsign Mav (2x), Grey Way, Kawi (2x), Melody Belle 2x), Starcraft, Sunline, Well Written
Howden Insurance Mile (Arrowfield Park/Windsor Park Plate)	1	Weight for Age	Hastings	1600m	Hello Dolly (2x), Kawi, Melody Belle, Miss Potential, Mufhasa, Starcraft, Wall Street
Livamol Classic	1	Weight for Age	Hastings	2040m	Melody Belle, Veandercross
Hawke's Bay Guineas	2	3YO SW	Hastings	1400m	Balmerino, Darci Brahma, Mr Tiz, Veandercross
New Zealand 2000 Guineas	1	3YO SW	Riccarton Racecourse	1600m	Surfers Paradise,
New Zealand 1000 Guineas	1	3YO Fillies SW	Riccarton Racecourse	1600m	Legarto, Tycoon Lil
New Zealand Cup	3	Open HCP	Riccarton Racecourse	3200m	Cuddle, Empire Rose, Fury's Order, Nightmarch
Mufhasa Classic (Captain Cook Stakes)	1	Weight for Age	Trentham Racecourse	1600m	Kawi, Mufhasa, Rough Habit
Waikato Cup	3	Open Hcp	Te Rapa	2400m	The Filbert
Auckland Guineas	2	3YO SW	Ellerslie Racecourse	1400m	Jimmy Choux, Puccini
Zabeel Classic	1	Weight for Age	Ellerslie Racecourse	2000m	Kawi, Vosne Romanee
Telegraph Handicap	1	Weight for Age	Trentham Racecourse	1200m	Darci Brahma, Mr Tiz, Mufhasa, O'Reilly
Levin Classic	1	3YO SW	Trentham Racecourse	1600m	Bonecrusher, Imperatriz, O'Reilly, Veandercross
Trentham Stakes	3	SWP	Trentham Racecourse	2100m	Castletown, Empire Rose
Railway Stakes	1	Open SWP	Ellerslie Racecourse	1200m	Avantage, Imperatriz, Mr Tiz (3x)
Karaka Million 2YO	R	2YO (Restricted)	Ellerslie Racecourse	1200m	Avantage, Melody Belle, Probabeel
Karaka Million 3YO Classic	R	3YO (Restricted)	Ellerslie Racecourse	1600m	Probabeel, Well Written
Aotearoa Classic	L	4YO SW	Ellerslie Racecourse	1600m	Orchestral
Desert Gold Stakes	3	3YO Fillies SW	Trentham Racecourse	1600m	La Mer, Princess Coup
Thorndon Mile	1	Open SWP	Trentham Racecourse	1600m	Grey Way, Kawi, McGinty, Melody Belle, Sir Slick
Wellington Cup	3	Open HCP	Trentham Racecourse	3200m	Battle Heights, Castletown, Cynisca, Ed, Good Lord, Great Sensation, Il Tempo, Kindergarten, Kiwi
Avondale Cup	2	Open	Ellerslie Racecourse	2400m	Even Stevens, Ginga Dude, Happy Union (2x), St Paul (3x, 1896-1898), Tulloch (4x, 1891-93), Whoshot the Barman
BCD Group Sprint (Waikato Sprint)	1	Weight for Age	Te Rapa	1400m	Avantage, Darci Brahma, Imperatriz, Melody Belle, Mr Tiz, Mufhasa, Poetic Prince, Sunline, Veandercross
Herbie Dyke Stakes	1	Weight for Age	Te Rapa	2000m	Battle Heights, Bonecrusher, Commissionaire, La Mer, Legarto, Sir Slick, The Phantom, The Phantom Chance
Otaki-Maori Weight for Age	1	Weight for Age	Ōtaki	1600m	Avantage, Darci Brahma, Kawi, Melody Belle, Mufhasa, Poetic Prince, Rough Habit, Sir Slick
New Zealand Derby	1	3YO SW	Ellerslie Racecourse	2400m	Balmerino, Bonecrusher, Desert Gold, Gloaming, Jimmy Choux, Kindergarten, Mainbrace, Mongolian Khan, Nightmarch, Silent Achiever, Surfers Paradise
NZB Kiwi	R	3YO	Ellerslie Racecourse	1500m	Damask Rose, Well Written
Bonecrusher New Zealand Stakes	1	Weight for Age	Ellerslie Racecourse	2000m	Avantage, Balmerino, Bonecrusher, La Mer, McGinty, Melody Belle, Ocean Park, Silent Achiever, Solvit, Surfers Paradise
Ellerslie Sires Produce Stakes/Sistema Stakes	1	2YO SW	Ellerslie Racecourse	1400m	Alamosa
Auckland Cup	2	Open SWP	Ellerslie Racecourse	3200m	Apollo Eleven, Beau Vite, Castletown, Cuddle, Il Tempo, Jezabeel, Kindergarten
New Zealand Oaks	1	3YO Fillies SW	Trentham Racecourse	2400m	Bonneval, La Mer, Princess Coup, Tycoon Lil
New Zealand St. Leger	L	Open SWP (prev 3yo & 3-4yo)	Trentham Racecourse	2600m	Beau Vite, Dalray, Hail, Kindergarten, Mainbrace, Silver Knight
Awapuni Gold Cup	2	Open	Awapuni	2000m	Balmerino, Desert Gold, Grey Way, Horlicks, Kindergarten, La Mer, Mainbrace, Nightmarch, Redcraze, Show Gate
Manawatu Sires Produce Stakes	1	2YO SW	Awapuni	1400m	Avantage, Daryl's Joy, La Mer, Melody Belle
Championship Stakes	2	3YO	Ellerslie Racecourse	2100m	Habibi, Silent Achiever, Wahid
Easter Handicap	3	3YO+ Open HCP	Ellerslie Racecourse	1600m	Grey Way, Kindergarten (2x), Sleepy Fox (4x), Veyron (2x)
New Zealand Thoroughbred Breeders Stakes	1	Weight for Age 3YO+ Fillies & Mares	Trentham / Ellerslie / Te Aroha / Te Rapa	1600m	Avantage, Imperatriz
Auckland Futurity Stakes (Great Northern Foal Stakes)	L	2YO	Ellerslie Racecourse	1400m	McGinty
Great Northern Hurdles	P	Jumping Hurdles	Te Rapa, formerly Ellerslie Racecourse	4190m	Brockton, Elrey (2x), Just Not Cricket (2x), Loch Linnie (2x), Mr Hickey (2x), Smoke Ring (2x), Solar Mist (2x), The Cossack (2x)
Great Northern Steeplechase	P	Jumping Steeplechase	Te Rapa, formerly Ellerslie Racecourse	6400m	Brockton (2x), Brookby Song (2x), Eiffel Tower, Golden Flare (2x), Hunterville (3x), Moifaa, West Coast (2x), Wise Men Say (2x)
Grand National Hurdles	P	Jumping Hurdles	Riccarton Racecourse	4200m	Counter Punch, Crown Star, Eiffel Tower
Grand National Steeplechase	P	Jumping Steeplechase	Riccarton Racecourse	5600m	Crown Star, West Coast
DB Draught Classic		Weight for Age	Ellerslie Racecourse	2100m	Only raced twice (1989 & 1990), both won by Horlicks

== Prominent people ==
Name	Born	Occupation	Contribution and Honours	Key horses associated with
Lisa Allpress	1975	Jockey	4 NZ jockey Premierships (2012, 2016, 2019 and 2020), 1956 NZ winning rides (as at January 2025)	Blood Brotha, Dark Destroyer, Jimmy Mac, Lunna Rossa, Ocean Park, Sentimental Miss, We Can Say It Now
Murray Baker	1946	Trainer	New Zealand Racing Hall of Fame, 5 Australian Derby wins	Dundeel, Jon Snow, Mongolian Khan, Nom du Jeu, Quick Thinker, Vin De Dance
Opie Bosson	1980	Jockey	Winner of over 2100 races in New Zealand and 87 overseas, 99 group 1 races (16 in Australia)	Imperatriz, Avantage, Gingernuts, Melody Belle, Mongolian Khan, Grand Archway, Probabeel, Quick Thinker, Te Akau Shark
Bill Broughton	1913-1990	Jockey	New Zealand Sports Hall of Fame, New Zealand Racing Hall of Fame, 11 times New Zealand Champion jockey, 1446 winners in New Zealand plus 11 in Australia	Sombrero, Soneri
Jim Cassidy	1963	Jockey	Winner of 104 Group One races, Australian Racing Hall of Fame, New Zealand Racing Hall of Fame	Kiwi, Might and Power, Rough Habit
John Bernard (Cos) Costello	1937 - 2019	Journalist and Author	Six decades in racing journalism, editor of the New Zealand Racing Annual and Blood Horse magazine and numerous racing books including Tapestry of Turf. Inducted into the New Zealand Racing Hall of Fame	
Sue Day (Walsh)		Jockey / trainer	First Kiwi woman to win in a totaliser race in New Zealand when winning on Jaws at Timaru	As a trainer: Chatham (NZ), Exquisite Jewel
Midge Didham	1945	Jockey and trainer	Winning rider in 1970 Melbourne Cup and 1980 & 1981 Caulfield Cups	Baghdad Note, Ming Dynasty, Silver Bounty
Shane Dye	1966	Jockey	4 consecutive Golden Slippers, Australian Racing Hall of Fame, New Zealand Racing Hall of Fame	Octagonal, Tawriffic
Hector Gray	1885-1957	Jockey and Trainer	7 NZ jockey premierships	
Bill Hazlett	1905-1978	Owner and breeder	First New Zealander to win more than 1,000 races as an owner. New Zealand Racing Hall of Fame	Eiffel Tower
Sir Patrick Hogan KNZM CBE	1939	Cambridge Stud master, breeder, owner	Knight Companion of the New Zealand Order of Merit, Australian Racing Hall of Fame, New Zealand Racing Hall of Fame	Sir Tristram, Zabeel
Joanne Hale (Giles)	1950	Jockey	First Kiwi woman to ride in a totaliser race in New Zealand on 15 July 1978 at Waimate	
Norm Holland	1924 - 2014	Jockey	Winner of NZ jockey premiership (3x) and over 900 race day wins	Algalon, Gene, Nusha, Palora, Stipulate, Syntax
Roger James		Trainer	Winner of many Group ones in New Zealand and Australia, including New Zealand Derby five times	Silent Achiever, Tidal Light, Zonda
Colin Jillings	1931 - 2022	Trainer	New Zealand Racing Hall of Fame	Stipulate, McGinty, Uncle Remus, The Phantom Chance
Chris Johnson		Jockey	Holds the record for NZ winning rides (2515). To this date Chris has won 21 group 1 races.	Canterbury Belle, Loader, Savvy Coup, Sea Swift, Tartan Tights, Tycoon Lil
Linda Jones	1952	Jockey	Trail blazing woman jockey. New Zealand Racing Hall of Fame	Holy Toledo, Lavaro
Sheila Laxon		Trainer	First female trainer to win the Caulfield Cup and Melbourne Cup double in 2001, co trainer of 2024 Melbourne Cup winner Knight's Choice	Empire Rose, Ethereal, Knight's Choice
Maree Lyndon		Jockey	First female winner of a Group One (the 1982 New Zealand Cup), 1990 Auckland Cup, first female to win a 3200m Cup in Australia (the 1987 Adelaide Cup, Lord Reims) and ride in the Melbourne Cup (1987), 544 winners (428 in New Zealand)	Argonaut Style, Miss Stanima, Sirtain
Trevor McKee and Stephen McKee	1937 - 2019	Trainers	New Zealand Order of Merit. 42 Group 1 wins, including Sunline’s Cox Plate double and Hong Kong Sprint	Sunline, Mufhasa, Solveig, Interval, Royal Tiara, Moonshine, Captivate, Boundless, Keepa Cruisin, Flying Luskin, Culminate, O’Marylin, Passing Shot, Pay My Bail
Michael Moroney	1958 - 2025	Trainer	Trained Brew to win the 2000 Melbourne Cup	Brew, Tofane, Xcellent
Lance O'Sullivan	1963	Jockey	New Zealand Racing Hall of Fame, Officer of the New Zealand Order of Merit	Horlicks, Popsy, Waverley Star
Paul O'Sullivan	1959	Trainer		Horlicks, Popsy, Surfers Paradise
Seton Otway	1894-1989	Founder of Trelawney Stud	New Zealand Racing Hall of Fame	Foxbridge, Alcimedes
Jamie Richards		Trainer		Avantage, Gingernuts, Melody Belle, Probabeel, Te Akau Shark, Xtravagant
Graeme Rogerson		Trainer	New Zealand Racing Hall of Fame	Efficient, Katie Lee, Savabeel
George Simon		Race caller	Long-time North Island race caller and TAB Trackside television presenter	
Robert James (Bob) Skelton	1934-2016	Jockey	New Zealand Racing Hall of Fame, New Zealand Sports Hall of Fame, Member of the Order of the British Empire	Great Sensation, Van der Hum
William David (Bill) Skelton	1931-2016	Jockey	New Zealand Racing Hall of Fame, New Zealand Sports Hall of Fame, Member of the Order of the British Empire	
Brent Thomson	1958	Jockey	Australian Racing Hall of Fame, New Zealand Racing Hall of Fame	Dandy Andy, Dulcify, Family of Man, Lord Reims, Strawberry Road
Mark Walker		Trainer	Over 2000 training wins in New Zealand, Australia and Singapore	Darci Brahma, Distinctly Secret, Imperatriz, Kings Chapel, Maroofity, Princess Coup, Tell A Tale
Michael Walker	1984	Jockey	1144 New Zealand winning rides	Darci Brahma, Tagaloa, Tit for Taat
Chris Waller	1973	Trainer	Australian Racing Hall of Fame, New Zealand Racing Hall of Fame	Winx
David Walsh	1959	Jockey	Previously held the record for most NZ wins (2451). Over 2500 wins worldwide, including the Telegraph Handicap (3x), W. S. Cox Plate, Brisbane Cup and Adelaide Cup. Married Sue Day, the first New Zealand woman to win a race against male jockeys.	Tanalyse, Courier Bay, Solvit

For further prominent people in New Zealand thoroughbred racing, see the list of honorees of the New Zealand Racing Hall of Fame.

=== Leading jockeys ===
According to www.racebase.co.nz the jockeys with over 2000 New Zealand wins are:

- 2515 Chris Johnson
- 2451 David Walsh
- 2355 Lance O'Sullivan
- 2167 Noel Harris
- 2156 Bill Skelton
- 2131 Michael Coleman
- 2093 David Peake
- 2125 Opie Bosson (as at 1 August 2026).

As at 1 August 2026:

- the next highest New Zealand winners are Lisa Allpress (1959) and Darryl Bradley (1832).
- after Lisa Allpress, the next highest female jockey is Trudy Thornton (1174) who is now in Queensland, Australia.

In April 2014 David Walsh passed Lance O'Sullivan's then record of 2355 for the most New Zealand wins. On 19 December 2020, Chris Johnson took the record for New Zealand winners from Walsh when he rode Sassenach to win at Awapuni.

In July 2020 senior jockey Michael Coleman retired after suffering injuries. He had ridden 2131 New Zealand winners, including 39 at Group 1, in his career.

On 17 February 2021 Danielle Johnson rode her 1000th winner, when she brought home Feelin’ Fancy in race 1 at Te Aroha. Her father, Peter Johnson, rode 1370 winners in his career.

=== Women jockeys ===
Linda Jones was the first to apply for an apprentice's licence and be turned down. She had ridden in a number of lady riders events over many years in New Zealand and overseas such as in Brazil, which highlighted that New Zealand and Australia were outliers in not allowing women to compete with male jockeys in professional races.

The first win by a woman in New Zealand was visiting Canadian jockey Joan Phipps, at Te Awamutu in November 1977.

In 1977 the New Zealand Racing Conference accepted female jockeys and they became eligible to ride on 15 July 1978 with the first Kiwi woman to ride in a totaliser race in New Zealand being Joanne Hale (Giles) on that day at Waimate. Sue Day (Christchurch), Joanne Lamond (Oamaru) and Vivienne Kaye (Awapuni) rode in later races on that day.

Sue Day became the first New Zealand female jockey winner in a totalisator race against males on 22 July 1978 when she won with the Ned Thistoll-trained Jaws in the Waybrook Handicap at Timaru. Another female jockey riding then was Cherie Saxon (Hastings).

Linda Jones' first win was on Big Bickies at Te Rapa and soon after Royal Petite was the first Open Handicap winner for a female jockey. Subsequent highlight wins for Linda were Lovaro in the Queen Elizabeth Handicap and Holy Toledo in the Wellington Derby on 22 January 1979 (possibly the first female jockey world-wide to win a Derby). Linda Jones was also the first female jockey to win a professional race against males at a registered meeting in Australia, winning aboard Pay The Purple in the Labour Day Cup at Doomben, Brisbane on May 7, 1979.

Maree Lyndon was the first female jockey to win a Group I race in New Zealand when winning the 1982 New Zealand Cup on Sirtain.

Although there was resistance from some industry participants, female jockeys have competed with great skill and success.

Female riders have subsequently gone on to win the New Zealand premiership:

- Lisa Cropp (2005-2007), 970 NZ winning rides. Winner of the New Zealand 2000 Guineas (2007) and Kelt Capital Stakes (2006).
- Lisa Allpress (2012, 2016, 2019 and 2020). 1956 NZ winning rides as at July 2025. Winner of the New Zealand Cup (2012 & 2015), New Zealand Oaks (2019), Wellington Cup (2013).
- Samantha Collett (2018), 969 NZ winning rides as at 14 March 2026. Winner of the Auckland Cup (2019 & 2020), Wellington Cup (2021).
- Danielle Johnson (2021), 1082 NZ winning rides and winner of the Livamol Classic (2021) and Telegraph Handicap (2021).

Other female riders of note include:

- Linda Ballentyne, 539 NZ winning rides, winner of the Kelt Capital Stakes (2000)
- Sarah Campbell, winner of the Auckland Cup (1995)
- Jan Cameron, winner of the New Zealand Cup (1996)
- Kim Clapperton, winner of the Malaysia-Singapore premiership in 1993 and the first female jockey to ride in Hong Kong (1995). Won the Raffles Cup three times in siccession (1993–95). First female winner of the Singapore Gold Cup (1995).
- Alysha Collett, winner of the Zabeel Classic (2016)
- Tina Comignaghi, 499 NZ winning rides as at 12 March 2026 and winner of the New Zealand Cup (2022)
- Hayley Curran, winner of the Grand National Hurdles (2013)
- Kelly Davidson, winner of the 1998 Easter Handicap, 159 NZ wins and 72 in Western Australia
- Tina Egan, winner of the Grand National Hurdles (1994) and Great Northern Steeplechase (1995).
- Leanne Elliot, winner of the Grand National Hurdles (1992) and Grand National Steeplechase (1995).
- Debbie Healey, winner of the Geelong Cup (1983) and Moe Cup (1982) with Debs Mate and first female jockey to compete in the Cox Plate
- Debbie Henderson, the first woman to win the Grand National Steeplechase (1994) as well as the Great Western Steeplechase and Great Western Hurdle in the same year.
- Leah Hemi, 309 NZ winning rides as at July 2025, Winner of the New Zealand Cup (2019)
- Kate Hercock, 432 NZ winning rides as at July 2025
- Michelle Hopkins, winner of the Grand National Hurdles (2004) and Great Northern Steeplechase (2001 & 2004).
- Shelley Houston, winner of the Great Northern Hurdles (2010 & 2012)
- Catherine Hutchison (formerly Tremayne), 590 NZ winning rides. Winner of the New Zealand Oaks (1989), New Zealand 1000 Guineas (1996), New Zealand 2000 Guineas (1996)
- Leanne Isherwood, 312 NZ winning rides. Winner of the Wellington Cup (1993 & 1999)
- Debbie Kennedy, 207 NZ winning rides. Winner of the 1995 & 1996 White Robe Stakes and 1999 Dunedin Cup.
- Rochelle Lockett, winner of the Grand National Hurdles (2002 & 2003) and Grand National Steeplechase (2000)
- Maree Lyndon, 428 NZ winning rides. Winner of the Auckland Cup (1990), New Zealand Cup (1982).
- Sarah Macnab, winner of the New Zealand Cup (2021)
- Portia Matthews, winner of the Grand National Hurdles (2023 & 2024)
- Kelly Myers, 764 NZ winning rides as at 14 March 2026. Winner of the New Zealand Cup (2008, 2014 & 2016)
- Rosie Myers, 650 NZ winning rides. Winner of the New Zealand Cup (2013), New Zealand Oaks (2011)
- Laura Noel, winner of the 2005 Great Northern Hurdles
- Megan Prendergast, winner of the Grand National Steeplechase (1999)
- Joanne Rathbone, winner of the Great Northern Steeplechase (2005)
- Samantha Spratt, 1127 NZ wins (as at August 2025), winner of the New Zealand Cup (2017 & 2018), New Zealand 1000 Guineas (2017), Wellington Cup (2016), Livamol Classic (2015), Telegraph Handicap (2009, 2011 and 2024)
- Trudy Thornton (formerly Archer and Collett), 1174 NZ winning rides. Winner of the Wellington Cup (2009 & 2020), Kelt Capital Stakes (1998), Zabeel Classic (2017).
- Lee Tiley (formerly Rutherford), 581 NZ winning rides. Winner of the New Zealand Cup (1997)
- Kayla Veenendaal, winner of the Grand National Hurdles (2013) and Great Northern Hurdles (2013)
- Michelle Wenn, 534 NZ winning rides, winner of the Easter Handicap (1999)
- Kylie Williams, 990 NZ wins (as at July 2025) including the Timaru Cup five times.

In late February 2020 Lisa Allpress was the first female to win a thoroughbred race in Saudi Arabia on the horse Matmon at King Abdullah Aziz racetrack in Riyadh. She was competing in the inaugural International Jockeys Challenge in which she competed with 14 other jockeys including 7 women. She won the very first race in the challenge. The challenge was won by American Hall of Fame jockey Mike Smith, Swiss-born Germany based Sibylle Vogt was second while Lisa was third equal with French jockey Mickaelle Michel.

== Prominent New Zealand horses ==
The following contains details of some of the top New Zealand horses. As well as those winning major races within New Zealand, locally owned and/or trained horses frequently go to Australia for racing campaigns or permanently due to the higher stake money in that country.

Between 1882 and 2019 New Zealand-bred horses won Australia's Melbourne Cup 43 times. During the 2008-09 racing season 19 New Zealand-bred Thoroughbreds won 22 Group One races around the world.

Horses may also go to Asia (mainly Hong Kong or Singapore) or on occasions to Europe or the United States.

Horse	Sire	Dam	Dam Sire	Trainer(s)	Notable victories or achievements
Advance	Vanguard	Laurel	Young Gownsman	Joe Prosser	1900 Easter Handicap, 1901 All Aged Stakes
Apollo Eleven	Cyrus	Lady Rizzo	Treasure Hunt	K. (Slim) Foster	1973 Tancred Stakes (now the BMW), Auckland Cup, AJC Plate now the Queen Elizabeth Stakes (ATC). 1973 & 1975 Chipping Norton Stakes
Avantage	Fastnet Rock	Asavant	Zabeel	Jamie Richards	2018 Karaka Million & Manawatu Sires Produce Stakes, 2019: Birthday Card Stakes (G3 Rosehill), 2020: Bonecrusher New Zealand Stakes, 2020 & 2021: Telegraph Handicap & Haunui Farm Classic, 2021: Railway Stakes & Waikato Sprint.
Baghdad Note	Kurdistan (GB)	Fairnote (NZ)	Fairs Fair (GB)	R (Bob) Heasley, then Terry Millard	1970: Melbourne Cup, 1973: P.J. O'Shea Stakes & Sandown Cup.
Balmerino	Trictrac (France)	Dulcie	Duccio	Brian Smith, Cambridge & John Dunlop	1975 New Zealand Derby, 1976 Brisbane Cup, Rawson Stakes, P.J. O'Shea Stakes (Eagle Farm), 2nd in Prix de l'Arc de Triomphe, 2008 inducted to New Zealand Racing Hall of Fame
Battle Heights	Battle Wagon (GB)	Wuthering Heights	Avocat General	Tim Douglas	1974 Wellington Cup, Sydney Cup, AJC Plate now the Queen Elizabeth Stakes (ATC), W. S. Cox Plate, 1976 Craven Plate, The Metropolitan (ATC)
Beau Vite	Beau Pere (GB)	Dominant (NZ)	Martian (NZ)	T.R. George, F McGrath Snr	1939 Canterbury Stakes, 1940: The Metropolitan (ATC), Hill Stakes, Great Northern Derby, Auckland Cup, Awapuni Gold Cup. 1940 & 1941: Colin Stephen Quality Handicap, W. S. Cox Plate, Craven Plate, LKS Mackinnon Stakes, 1941: Rawson Stakes, AJC Plate, Chelmsford Stakes
Bonecrusher	Pag-Asa	Imitation	Oakville	Frank Ritchie	1985 New Zealand Derby, 1986 Australian Derby, Tancred Stakes, Caulfield Stakes, W. S. Cox Plate, Underwood Stakes, 1987 Australian Cup, 2010 inducted into the New Zealand Racing Hall of Fame
Carbine	Musket (GB)	Mersey (GB)	Knowsley	Walter S. Hickenbotham	1889 & 1890 Sydney Cup & All Aged Stakes, 1890 Melbourne Cup, Melbourne Stakes, Craven Plate, AJC Spring Stakes, 1889, 1890 & 1891 AJC Plate (now the Queen Elizabeth Stakes (ATC)), 2006 inducted to New Zealand Racing Hall of Fame
Castletown	One Pound Sterling (GB)	Mona Curragh	Levmoss	Patrick M Bussuttin	1989 New Zealand Derby, 1991 Kelt Capital Stakes, 1992 Auckland Cup & Caulfield Stakes, 1991, 1992 & 1994 Wellington Cup, 2014 inducted into New Zealand Racing Hall of Fame
Cuddle	Psychology (GB)	Caress (NZ)	Martian (NZ)	C J Stowe	1935 New Zealand Cup, 1935 & 1936 Auckland Cup, 1936 All Aged Stakes, St George Stakes & Doncaster Handicap, 2014 inducted into New Zealand Racing Hall of Fame
Cynisca	Apremont	Nautilus	Traducer		1890, 1891 & 1892 Wellington Cup, 1892 Easter Handicap
Dalray	Balloch (GB)	Broiveine (NZ)	Broiefort (Fra)	Clarrie McCarthy	1951: New Zealand Derby, 1952: Great Northern Derby, Trentham Stakes, Colin Stephen Quality Handicap, The Metropolitan (ATC), LKS Mackinnon Stakes, Melbourne Cup
Darci Brahma	Danehill	Grand Echezeaux	Zabeel	Mark Walker	2005: New Zealand 2000 Guineas, Otaki-Maori Weight for Age, The T J Smith, 2007: Waikato Sprint, Telegraph Handicap
Daryl's Joy	Stunning (GB)	Rutha (NZ)	Ruthless (GB)	Syd Brown (NZ), later Charlie Whittingham (USA)	1969 Manawatu Sires Produce Stakes, Cox Plate, Victoria Derby, Moonee Valley Stakes, 1970: Del Mar Handicap, 1971: Arcadia Handicap & San Luis Obispo Handicap
Desert Gold	All Black (GB)	Aurarius (Aust)	Maltster	Fred Davis	1915: New Zealand 1000 Guineas, Manawatu Sires Produce & New Zealand Derby, 1916: New Zealand Oaks, Great Northern Derby, 1916, 1917 & 1918: Awapuni Gold Cup, 1918: St George Stakes & All Aged Stakes, 2008 inducted into New Zealand Racing Hall of Fame
Dundeel/It's A Dundeel	High Chaparral	Stareel	Zabeel	Murray Baker & Andrew Forsman	2012: Gloaming Stakes, Spring Champion Stakes, 2013 Randwick Guineas, Rosehill Guineas, Australian Derby, Underwood Stakes. 2014 Queen Elizabeth Stakes (ATC)
Empire Rose	Sir Tristram (Ire)	Summer Fleur	Sovereign Edition	Laurie Laxon	1987 New Zealand Cup, 1988 LKS Mackinnon Stakes & Melbourne Cup, 1989 Trentham Stakes
Ethereal	Rhythm (USA)	Romanee Conti	Sir Tristram	Sheila Laxon	2001 Queensland Oaks, Caulfield Cup & Melbourne Cup, 2002 The BMW, 2016 inducted into New Zealand Racing Hall of Fame
Even Stevens	Fairs Fair	Amaroo	Gold Nib	Archie McGregor	1961 Avondale Cup, 1962 CB Fisher Plate, Caulfield Cup & Melbourne Cup
Foxzami	Nizami	Honeywood	Foxbridge	Dan Lewis	1949 STC Cup & Melbourne Cup
Furys Order	Indian Order (GB)	Our Fury (NZ)	Le Filou (FR)	Wally McEwan	1973: New Zealand Derby, New Zealand 2000 Guineas, 1974 New Zealand Cup, 1975 W. S. Cox Plate
Gloaming	The Welkin (GB)	Light (GB)	Eager	Dick Mason	1918: Chelmsford Stakes, AJC Derby, New Zealand Derby, Wanganui Guineas, 1919: Great Northern Derby, Wellington Stakes, 1919/1922/1924 Craven Plate. 1922: Hill Stakes. 1924: Melbourne Stakes, AJC Spring Stakes), 1922/1924/1925 North Island Challenge Stakes. From 67 starts won 57 and 2nd 9 times, fell once. 2004: Inducted into Australian Racing Hall of Fame, 2006: Inducted into New Zealand Racing Hall of Fame
Great Sensation	Cassock (GB)	Speedy (NZ)	Irish Lancer	Mick Brown	1960: Invercargill Gold Cup, Canterbury Gold Cup, 1961, 1962 & 1963 Wellington Cup, 1960 & 1962 Trentham Stakes
Grey Way	Grey William (GB)	Waybrook (NZ)	King's Command	E P Corboy, Washdyke	1974 Chirnside Stakes, 1976 Awapuni Gold Cup, 1977 Easter Handicap, 2010 inducted into New Zealand Racing Hall of Fame
Gurner's Lane	Sir Tristram	Taiona	Sovereign Edition (IRE)	Geoff Murphy	1982: Newcastle Gold Cup, VRC St Leger, Caulfield Cup, Melbourne Cup
Horlicks	Three Legs (GB)	Malt (NZ)	Moss Trooper (USA)	Dave and Paul O'Sullivan	1989 LKS Mackinnon Stakes, Japan Cup. 1988 & 1990 ARC Television New Zealand Stakes, 1989 & 1990 DB Draught Classic, 2010 inducted into New Zealand Racing Hall of Fame. Dam of Brew
Il Tempo	Time and Again (Ire)	Timing (NZ)	Timanova (GB)	Bruce Priscott	1969 & 1970 Auckland Cup, 1970 Wellington Cup,
Imperatriz	I Am Invincible	Berimbau	Sharmadal	Mark Walker	2021 Eclipse Stakes, 2021 Northland Breeders Stakes, 2021 Soliloquay Stakes, 2022 Levin Classic, 2022 New Zealand Thoroughbred Breeders Stakes, 2022 Foxbridge Plate, 2023 Railway Stakes (New Zealand), 2023 Westbury Classic, 2023 Waikato Sprint, 2023 and 2024 William Reid Stakes, 2023 McEwen Stakes, 2023 A J Moir Stakes, 2023 Manikato Stakes, 2023 Champions Sprint (VRC), 2024 Black Caviar Lightning
Isle Of Man	Habitation	Full O'Tricks	Trictrac	Davina Waddell	1981 New Zealand Derby, 1982 Rosehill Guineas
Jezabeel	Zabeel	Passefleur	Vice Regal	Brian Jenkins	1998: Auckland Cup, Melbourne Cup
Jimmy Choux	Thorn Park	Cierzo	Centaine	John Bary	2010 Hawke's Bay Guineas & New Zealand 2000 Guineas, 2011 New Zealand Derby, Rosehill Guineas, Windsor Park Plate, Spring Classic
Katie Lee	Pins (Aus)	Miss Jessie Jay (NZ)	Spectacularphantom (USA)	Graeme & Debbie Rogerson	2009 Eclipse Stakes, New Zealand 2000 Guineas & New Zealand 1000 Guineas
Kindergarten	Kincardine (GB)	Valadore	Valkyrian	E. N. Fitzgerald	1941 Great Northern Derby, Awapuni Gold Cup, Wellington Cup, 1941 & 1942 Easter Handicap, 1942 Auckland Cup, 2006 inducted into New Zealand Racing Hall of Fame
Kiwi	Blarney Kiss (USA)	Malrayvis (NZ)	Messmate (GB)	Snow Lupton, Waverley	1983 Wellington Cup, Melbourne Cup
La Mer	Copenhagen II	La Balsa	Worden II	Malcolm K Smith, New Plymouth	1976 Manawatu Sires Produce Stakes, 1977: Auckland Thoroughbred Breeders Stakes, New Zealand Oaks & Trentham Stakes, 1978: New Zealand International Stakes, Awapuni Gold Cup & Desert Gold Stakes 1978 & 1979: Ormond Memorial Stakes (now Spring Classic), 1979: Air New Zealand Stakes
Limerick	Limond (GB)	Medley	Varco (GB)	Fred D Jones	1926, 1927 & 1928 Chelmsford Stakes, 1927: AJC Plate, Craven Plate, 1927 & 1928: Rawson Stakes, AJC Spring Stakes, Hill Stakes, 1928: All Aged Stakes, Chipping Norton Stakes, AJC Kings Cup
Little Brown Jug	Godavari (Ire)	Pease (NZ)	Targui (Fra)	P Jones, Riccarton	1979 Canterbury Gold Cup, New Zealand 2000 Guineas, 1980 Wellington Stakes. Won 12 of 15 New Zealand starts.
Mainbrace	Admiral's Luck (GB)	Maneroo	Siegfried (GB)	Jack McDonald	1950 Great Northern Guineas, 1951: Great Northern Derby, New Zealand St. Leger, Awapuni Gold Cup, North Island Challenge Stakes, 2008 inducted to New Zealand Racing Hall of Fame
McGinty	One Pound Sterling (GB)	Ernader (NZ)	Serenader II (Ire)	Colin Jillings, Takanini	1981/82 Great Northern Foal Stakes, 1982 Todman Slipper Trial, 1983 George Adams Stakes, Air New Zealand Stakes, Caulfield Stakes, 1984 Rawson Stakes, Air New Zealand Stakes
Melody Belle	Commands	Meleka Belle	Iffraaj	Jamie Richards	2017: Manawatu Sires Produce Stakes. 2018/19: Windsor Park Plate, Tarzino Trophy. 2019: Haunui Farm Classic, Waikato Sprint, Bonecrusher New Zealand Stakes, Livamol Spring Classic, Empire Rose Stakes.
Miss Potential	Dolphin Street	Richfield Rose	Crested Wave	Bill Borrie	2003 Mudgway Stakes, 2004 Nestle Peters Classic (later known as Myer Classic & Empire Rose Stakes), 2005 Stoneybridge Stakes.
Moifaa	Natator	Denbigh	The Painter	W Hickey	1904 Grand National, Aintree Racecourse, England. 2014: inducted into New Zealand Racing Hall of Fame
Mongolian Khan	Holy Roman Emperor (Ire)	Centafit (NZ)	Centaine	Murray Baker & Andrew Forsman	2015: Waikato Guineas, Avondale Guineas, New Zealand Derby, Australian Derby & Caulfield Cup
Mr Tiz	Bletchingly	Yir Tiz	Bismark	Dave & Paul O'Sullivan	1989 & 1990 Telegraph Handicap, 1989, 1990 & 1991 Railway Stakes, 1991: Waikato Sprint & The Galaxy, 2014 inducted into New Zealand Racing Hall of Fame
Mufhasa	Pentire (GB)	Shiela Cheval (NZ)	Mi Preferido	Stephen McKee	2008 GR Kelt Memorial, Coupland's Bakeries Mile, 2009 Telegraph Handicap, Waikato Sprint, 2010 Otaki-Maori Weight for Age, 2011 Telegraph Handicap, Waikato Sprint, Makfi Challenge Stakes, Toorak Handicap, Captain Cook Stakes, 2012 Futurity (Caulfield), Windsor Park Plate, Manawatu Challenge Stakes
Nightmarch	Night Raid (GB)	Marsa	Martian	Jim McAulay	1928: New Zealand Derby, New Zealand 2000 Guineas, 1929: Epsom Handicap, W. S. Cox Plate, Melbourne Cup, 1930: New Zealand Cup, Rawson Stakes, 1930 & 1932 AJC Autumn Stakes, 1931 & 1932 Awapuni Gold Cup, 1932 AJC Cumberland Stakes
Ocean Park	Thorn Park	Sayyida	Zabeel	Gary Hennessy	2012: Wellington Guineas, Challenge Stakes, Underwood Stakes, Caulfield Stakes, W. S. Cox Plate, 2013 New Zealand Stakes
O'Reilly	Last Tycoon (Ire)	Courtza (NZ)	Pompeii Court (USA)	David J & Paul O'Sullivan, Matamata	1996 Levin Classic, 1997 Telegraph Handicap. 1996/97 Horse of the year. Retired to stud after injury in Newmarket Handicap, 6th start. Champion sire. Inducted into New Zealand Racing Hall of Fame
Our Maizcay (Aus)	Maizcay (Aus)	Maire Viita (Ire)	Dalsaan (GB)	Grant L Searle, Levin	1994: Wellesley Stakes, 1995: Eclipse Stakes, NZ Magic Millions Classic, Wakefield Stakes, Caulfield Guineas
Phar Lap	Night Raid (GB)	Entreaty (NZ)	Winkie (GB)	Harry Telford	1929: Rosehill Guineas, AJC Derby, Victoria Derby, 1930: VRC St Leger, Chipping Norton Stakes, AJC Plate now the Queen Elizabeth Stakes (ATC), Chelmsford Stakes, Melbourne Cup, CB Fisher Plate, 1931: St George Stakes, Futurity Stakes, Underwood Stakes, Memsie Stakes, 1929, 1930 & 1931: Craven Plate, 1930 & 1931 AJC Springs Stakes, W. S. Cox Plate, Melbourne Stakes, 1932: Agua Caliente Handicap (Tijuana, Mexico), 2001: Inaugural induction to Australian Racing Hall of Fame, 2006: Inducted in New Zealand Racing Hall of Fame
Poetic Prince	Yeats (USA)	Finisterre (Aus)	Biscay	John Wheeler	1988 Otaki-Maori Weight for Age, Feehan Stakes, W. S. Cox Plate. 1989: Otaki-Maori Weight for Age, Queen Elizabeth Stakes (ATC) & Tancred Stakes
Prince Majestic	Noble Bijou (USA)	Princess Mellay (NZ)	Mellay (GB)	Ray Verner, Takanini	1980 Wanganui Guineas, AJC Spring Champion Stakes, 1981: Taranaki Stakes, WRC Harcourt Stakes 1982: Tancred Stakes, Queen Elizabeth Stakes (ATC), 1983 O'Shea Stakes (Eagle Farm),
Princess Coup	Encosta De Lago	Stoneyfell Road	Sovereign Red	Mark Walker	2007: New Zealand Oaks, Desert Gold Stakes, Lowland Stakes, 2007 & 2008 Kelt Capital Stakes (Spring Classic), 2008 Stoneybridge Stakes
Redcraze	Red Mars (GB)	Myarion	Myosotis (GB)	Syd Brown, T.J. Smith	1955: Awapuni Gold Cup, Turnbull Stakes, 1956: Brisbane Cup, Metropolitan Handicap, Caulfield Stakes, Colin Stephen Quality Handicap, Caulfield Cup, 1956 & 1957 P.J. O'Shea Stakes & Hill Stakes, 1957 Rawson Stakes, W. S. Cox Plate, VRC Queen Elizabeth Stakes, AJC Autumn Stakes, 2012 inducted into New Zealand Racing Hall of Fame
Ring the Bell	Rangong (GB)	Witchcraft (NZ)	Mystery (GB)	Neville Atkins, Waiuku	1981: Avondale Championship Stakes, Avondale Guineas, New Zealand Derby, Canterbury Guineas
Rising Fast	Alonzo	Faster	Mr. Standfast	Ivan Tucker, Fred Hoysted	1954: Caulfield Stakes, W. S. Cox Plate, Melbourne Cup, Turnbull Stakes, John F. Feehan Stakes, 1954 & 1955 Caulfield Cup, C.B.Fisher Plate, VRC Queen Elizabeth Stakes, LKS Mackinnon Stakes, 1955: Herbert Power Stakes, 1956: Blamey Stakes, C F Orr Stakes, Memsie Stakes, 2002: Inducted into Australian Racing Hall of Fame, 2008: inducted to the New Zealand Racing Hall of Fame
Riverina Charm	Sir Tristram (Ire)	Country Charm (Ire)	Northfields (USA)	Laurie Laxon (NZ), then Brian Mayfield-Smith (Sydney)	1987-88 Rosehill Guineas, 1988: VRC Edward Manifold Stakes, 1000 Guineas (Caulfield), 1989: STC Canterbury Guineas, 1990: Air New Zealand Stakes. Dam of Sarwatch and Paolino
Roman Consul	Agricola	Jinks (NZ)	Faux Tirage (GB)	Eric Ropiha, Woodville	1965: New Zealand Derby, 1967, 1968 & 1969: Chelmsford Stakes, 1968: Colin Stephen Quality Handicap, 1969: LKS Mackinnon Stakes, 1969 & 1970: O'Shea Stakes (Eagle Farm)
Rough Habit	Roughcast (USA)	Certain Habit (NZ)	Ashabit (GB)	John Wheeler	1990 Queensland Derby, 1991 Mudgway Stakes, 1991 & 1992 Stradbroke Handicap, 1992 Captain Cook Stakes, AJC Queen Elizabeth Stakes, 1991, 1992 & 1993 Doomben Cup, 1992 & 1993 All Aged Stakes, 1995: O'Shea Stakes (Eagle Farm) 2012 inducted into the New Zealand Racing Hall of Fame
Sacred Falls	O'Reilly	Iguazu's Girl	Redoute's Choice	Chris Waller	2012: Hawke's Bay Guineas, New Zealand 2000 Guineas, 2013 & 2014 Doncaster Handicap, 2014 George Main Stakes
Seachange	Cape Cross	Just Cruising	Broad Reach	Graeme Sanders	2005: New Zealand 1000 Guineas, 2006 & 2007: Mudgway Stakes, Stoneybridge Stakes, 2007 Mannerism Stakes, Telegraph Handicap & Waikato Sprint
Seagram	Balak	Llanah	Bally Royal (GB)	David Barons	1991 Grand National, Aintree Racecourse, England
Show Gate	Gate Keeper (GB)	Minglow	Globe of Light (GB)	Gordon Thomson (Mosgiel)	1973 & 1974: Churchill Stakes, 1973, 1974 & 1976: Stewards Handicap, 1974: Telegraph Handicap, Awapuni Gold Cup, 1974 & 1976: Canterbury Gold Cup, 1976: Dunedin Gold Cup, Trentham Stakes, 2012: inducted into the New Zealand Racing Hall of Fame
Silver Knight	Alcimedes	Cuban Fox	Foxbridge	Eric Temperton	1971: New Zealand St. Leger & Melbourne Cup
Sir Slick	Volksraad	Miss Opera	Paris Opera	Graham Nicholson	2007: Zabeel Classic & Whakanui New Zealand International Stakes, Otaki-Maori Weight for Age, 2008: New Zealand Stakes, 2007 & 2009 Thorndon Mile, 2007, 2008 & 2010 Awapuni Gold Cup, 2009 3rd Doomben Cup
Solveig	Imposing (Aust)	Soliloquy	Sobig	C G Curnow & Trevor McKee, then Stephen & Trevor McKee, Takanini	1983/84 Royal Stakes, New Zealand Oaks, 1986: Avondale Cup
Solvit	Morcon (GB)	Yallah Sun (AUS)	Yallah Native (USA)	Mrs M J Murdoch	1991: Wellington Thoroughbred Breeders Stakes, Waikato Guineas. 1992: Waterford Crystal Mile in Moonee Valley. 1993: New Zealand Stakes, Manawatu Challenge Stakes. 1994: Action TV Sales Stakes, Kelt Capital Stakes, W. S. Cox Plate. 1995: Japan Racing Association Trophy, Challenge Stakes.
Sunline	Desert Sun (GB)	Songline	Western Symphony (USA)	Trevor and Stephen McKee	1999 & 2000 W. S. Cox Plate, 1999 & 2002: Doncaster Handicap, 2000 Manikato Stakes & Hong Kong Mile, 2000 & 2002: All Aged Stakes & Coolmore Classic, 2001 & 2002 Waikato Sprint, 2006 inducted into New Zealand Racing Hall of Fame
Surfers Paradise	Crested Wave	Lady Aythorpe	Aythorpe	Dave & Paul OSullivan	1990 New Zealand 2000 Guineas & New Zealand Derby, 1991 Air New Zealand Stakes, Rosehill Guineas, W. S. Cox Plate
Tawrrific	Tawfiq	Joyarty	Noble Bijou	Lee Freedman	1988 South Australian St Leger, 1989: AJC St Leger, Melbourne Cup
The Filbert	Souvran (GB)	Fauxzann	Zamazaan	Don Couchman, Hawera	1986: Waikato Gold Cup, 3rd to Bonecusher & Waverley Star in the W. S. Cox Plate, 1987: Japan New Zealand International. 3rd in Japan Cup
The Phantom Chance	Noble Bijou (USA)	The Fantasy (NZ)	Gate Keeper	Colin Jillings	1992 Avondale Guineas, New Zealand Derby, 1993: Cambridge Stud New Zealand International Stakes, W. S. Cox Plate, Turnbull Stakes 1996: O'Shea Stakes (Eagle Farm)
The Phantom	Noble Bijou (USA)	The Fantasy (NZ)	Gate Keeper	Murray Baker	1990: Underwood Stakes, 1993: LKS Mackinnon Stakes, 1994 Cambridge Stud New Zealand International Stakes
Tidal Light	Diagrammatic (USA)	Azores (AUS)	King Of Babylon	Jim Gibbs and R A James	Avondale Guineas, Waikato Guineas, 1986 New Zealand Derby, 1987 Canterbury Guineas, Air New Zealand Stakes
Tulloch	Khorassan	Florida	Salmagundi	Tommy J. Smith	1957: VRC Derby, AJC Derby, Queensland Derby, Rosehill Guineas, Warwick Stakes, Caulfield Stakes, Caulfield Cup, 1958: All Aged Stakes, Rawson Stakes, VRC St Leger, AJC St leger, 1958 & 1960: Chipping Norton Stakes, 1960: W. S. Cox Plate, LKS Mackinnon Stakes, Chelmsford Stakes, Craven Plate, 1961: Brisbane Cup, 1958, 1960 & 1961: Queen Elizabeth Stakes (ATC), 1960 & 1961: P.J. O'Shea Stakes, 2008: Inducted to the New Zealand Racing Hall of Fame
Tycoon Lil	Last Tycoon (Ire)	Imposing Bloom II (NZ)	Imposing (Aus)	Colin Jillings & Richard Yuill	1997: New Zealand 1000 Guineas, 1998 Royal Stakes, Sir Tristram Fillies Classic, New Zealand Oaks, Canterbury Guineas, Auckland Thoroughbred Breeders Stakes,
Uncle Remus	Bandmaster II	Tusitala	Talismano	Colin Jillings, Takanini	1977 Wellington Guineas, New Zealand 2000 Guineas, Canterbury Gold Cup, Avondale Guineas, New Zealand Derby. 1978 Wellington Stakes, Wellington Derby,
Van der Hum	Hermes (GB)	Tip O'Dawn (NZ)	Count Rendered (GB)	Leo H Robinson	1976 Herbert Power Handicap & Melbourne Cup, 1982 Waikato Hurdle & Hawkes Bay Hurdle, 1983 Rangitikei Steeplechase, 1984 Egmont Steeplechase
Veandercross	Crossways (GB)	Lavender	Super Gray (USA)	Chris Turner	1991: Levin Classic, New Zealand 2000 Guineas, 1992: Canterbury Guineas, LKS Mackinnon Stakes, 1993 Queen Elizabeth Stakes, Ranvet Stakes, Australian Cup, 2018 inducted into New Zealand Racing Hall of Fame
Vice Regal	Bismark II (GB)	Kind Regards	Le Filou (Fra)	Jim W Campin (Cambridge)	1976: Ellerslie Sires Produce Stakes, Great Northern Guineas, Wellington Guineas, New Zealand 2000 Guineas, 1977: South Australian St Leger, Liston Stakes (Victoria), Feehan Stakes,
Volkstok'n'barrell	Tavistock (NZ)	Volkster (NZ)	Volksraad (GB)	1) Donna Logan (NZ), 2) Chris Gibbs (NZ), 3) Danny O'Brien	2015: Great Northern Guineas, Karaka 3YO Mile, Rosehill Guineas, 2016: Haunui Farm Classic, New Zealand Stakes, 2017: Herbie Dyke Stakes,
Waverley Star / Our Waverley Star	Star Way	Super Show	Great Nephew (GB)	Dave & Paul O'Sullivan	1986 Zabeel Classic, 2nd to Bonecrusher in W. S. Cox Plate, 1987: Chipping Norton Stakes
Xcellent	Pentire	Excelo	Centro	Michael Moroney	2004 New Zealand Derby, 2005: Mudgway Stakes, New Zealand Stakes, Kelt Capital Stakes, 3rd in Melbourne Cup, 2008: Trentham Stakes
Zabeel	Sir Tristram	Lady Giselle	Nureyev	Colin Hayes, then David Hayes	1989 Moonee Valley Stakes, 1990 Australian Guineas, Craiglee Stakes, Champion/Leading Sire in New Zealand (1998-2001) and 1997/98 & 1998/99 Leading sire in Australia. 2014 inducted into New Zealand Racing Hall of Fame. Successful sire.
Zonda	Zabeel	Gone With The Wind	Light Wind (Fra)	Roger James	1997 New Zealand Derby, 2000 Kings Plate, 2001 Zabeel Classic

=== Notable sires ===
Horse	Born	Sire	Dam	Grandsire	Damsire	Key Progeny	Notes
Darci Brahma	2002	Danehill	Grand Echezeaux	Danzig (USA)	Zabeel	Catalyst, Gust Of Wind, Julinsky Prince, Nashville,	
Foxbridge	1930	Foxlaw	Bridgemount	Son-in-Law (GB)	Bridge Of Earn (GB)	Damsire of: Hi Jinx, Hiraji, Macdougal, Silver Knight	The Foxbridge Plate is raced at Te Rapa over 1200m
Grosvenor	1979	Sir Tristram	My Tricia (NZ)	Sir Ivor	Hermes (GB)	Alacrity, Domino, Ebony Grosve, Look Who's Talking, Omnicorp, Richfield Lady/Lass, Westminster	
O’Reilly	1993-2014	Last Tycoon (Ire)	Courtza (NZ)	Try My Best (USA)	Pompeii Court (USA)	Alamosa, Final Destination, Sacred Falls, Shamrocker, Silent Achiever, The Jewel	
Pakistan II	1958 - 1972	Palestine	Tambara	Fair Trial	Nasrullah		
Pins (Aus)	1996-2018	Snippets (Aus)	No Finer (Aus)	Lunchtime (GB)	Kaoru Star (Aus)	Aerovelocity, Ambitious Dragon, El Segundo, Katie Lee, Legs	
Savabeel	2001	Zabeel	Savannah Success	Sir Tristram	Success Express	Kawi, Probabeel, Sangster, Scarlett Lady, Shillelagh	
Sir Tristram (Ire)	1971-1997	Sir Ivor (USA)	Isolt	Sir Gaylord	Round Table, USA	Brew, Empire Rose, Grosvenor, Gurner's Lane, Marauding, Tristarc, Zabeel	Did not race in NZ. 1982/83, 1984/85, 1985/86, 1986/87, 1988/89 & 1989/90 Leading sire in Australia, 2008: inducted into New Zealand Racing Hall of Fame
Volksraad	1998-2011	Green Desert (USA)	Celtic Assembly	Danzig (USA)	Secretariat	Sir Slick, Military Move, Torlesse	
Zabeel	1986-2015	Sir Tristram	Lady Giselle	Sir Ivor	Nureyev	Efficient, Jezabeel, Lonhro, Might and Power, Octagonal, Savabeel, Vengeance of Rain, Zonda	1998-99 & 1997-98 Leading sire in Australia. The Zabeel Classic is raced at Ellerslie
Zamazaan	1965-1990	Exbury	Toyama	Le Haar	Tulyar	Beau Zam, Gelsomino, Good Lord, Lord Reims	

== Recent winners of major NZ Cups ==
The following are the recent winners of major cups.

Year	New Zealand Cup (Riccarton) 3200m	Auckland Cup (Ellerslie) 3200m	Wellington Cup (Trentham) 3200/2400m	Awapuni Gold Cup (Awapuni) 2000m	Waikato Gold Cup (Te Rapa) 2400m	Counties Cup (Pukekohe) 2100m	Manawatu Cup (Awapuni) 2300m	Avondale Cup (Avondale) 2400 /2200 /2000m
2026	Just Charlie	Paradise Storm	Manzor Blue	He's A Doozy		Gigi		Final Return
2025	Bozo	Trav	Wolfgang	Waitak	Sharp 'N' Smart	Final Return	Sagunto	Blue Sky At Night
2024	Mehzebeen	Mahrajaan	Mary Louise	Nereus	Blue Sky At Night	Nereus	Islington Lass	Asterix
2023	Mahrajaan	Platinum Invador	Leaderboard	Brando	Dionysus	One Bold Cat	Sagunto	Aquacade
2022	Aljay	Uareastar	Lincoln King	Zola Express	Viktor Vegas	Aromatic	Sagunto	Hinepara
2021	Mondorani	Ocean Billy	Waisake	Beauden	Cheaperthan divorce	Justamaiz	Marroni	Robusto
2020	Dragon Storm	Roger That	Soleseifei	not held	Ocean Billy	In A Twinkling	Hunta Pence	Polzeath
2019	Dee And Gee	Glory Days	Gorbachev	Jacksstar	Justamaiz	In A Twinkling	Concert Hall	Glory Days
2018	Bizzwinkle	Ladies First	Magic Chai	Our Abbadean	Mongolian Marsh	Igraine	Rock On	Zacada
2017	Gobstopper	Chenille	Savaria	Sampson	Five to Midnight	Maygrove	Clarify	El Soldado
2016	Pump Up The Volume	El Soldado	Mister Impatience	Maygrove	Lizzie Lamour	Chocante	Jacksstar	Sacred Master
2015	Jimmy Mac	Rock Diva	Maygrove	Iamwishwara	Vavasour	Vavasour	Weregoingtogetcha	Farm Boy
2014	Mungo Jerry	Who Shot Thebarman	Graphic	Soriana	Surpass	Noble Warrior	Perfect Start	Who Shot Thebarman
2013	Spring Cheer	Sangster	Blood Brotha	Better Than Ever	More Than Sacred	Annie Higgins	Military Move	Sangster
2012	Blood Brotha	Shez Sinsational	Six O'Clock News	Riomoral	Annie Higgins	Jeu De Cartes	Ransomed	Single Minded
2011	Blood Brotha	Titch	Spiro	Hold It Harvey	Dawn Ghost	Postmans Daughter	Cassini	Showcause
2010	Showcause	Zavite	Red Ruler	Sir Slick	Bruce Almighty	Tinseltown	Tullaroan	[not raced]
2009	My Scotsgrey	Spin Around	Megapins	MacO'Reilly	Passchendale	Boundless	High Octane	Ginga Dude
2008	Hoorang	Prize Lady	Young Centaur	Sir Slick	Lovetrista	Galleons Reach	Jonbalena	Tinseltown
2007	Everswindell	Prize Lady	Willy Smith	Sir Slick	Mirkola Lass	Spin Around	Nanjara	Spin Around
2006	Pentathlon	Pentane	Envoy	Tusker	Bak Da Chief	Chettak	Chettak	Sharvasti
2005	Trebla	Bazelle	Zabeat	Distinctly Secret	Kerry O'Reilly	Kerry O'Reilly	All Square	Creil
2004	Waltermitty	Upsetthym	Cluden Creek	Irish Rover / Distinctly Secret	Singing Star	St Reims	Tantalic	The Mighty Lion
2003	Torlesse	Bodie	Oarsmen	Maze	El Duce	Leica Guv & Penny Gem	Rising Heights	Regal Krona
2002	Mike	Maguire	Cyclades	Cent Home	El Duce	Deecee Belle	Small Town Boy	Regal Krona
2001	Soldier Blue	Our Unicorn	Smiling Like	Cronus	Okiwi Bay	Kaapeon	Beaujolais	Greene Street
2000	Smiling Like	Able Master	Second Coming	Cruzeiro	Bluebird The Word	King Keitel	Reign Supreme	Shes a Meanie
1999	Wake Forest	Irish Chance	Miss Bailey	Emerald	Rijeka	The Mighty Finn	Tokyo Beau	Trounced
1998	Sapio	Jezabeel *	Aerosmith	Magnet Bay	Dannevegas	Glendara	Emerald	Yes Indeed
1997	Laud Peregrine	Yobro	Ed	Interval	La Sileen	Somojo	Paddy O’Riley	Silky Oak

- Jezabeel, who was also 2nd in the 1997 Manawatu Cup, won the 1998 Melbourne Cup

== Recent winners of major NZ sprint races ==
The following table contains the recent winners of major races for sprinters (generally distances of 1500m or less).

The winners of the Tarzino Trophy over 1400m are shown in the table for New Zealand's Hastings Triple Crown.

Year	Railway Stakes (Ellerslie) 1200m	Telegraph Handicap (Trentham) 1200m	Waikato Sprint (Te Rapa) 1400m	Otaki-Maori Weight for Age (Otaki) 1400m / 1600m	Foxbridge Plate (Te Rapa) 1400m	Stewards Stakes Handicap (Riccarton) 1200m
2026	Jigsaw	First Five	First Five	Jaarffi	Alabama Lass	Archaic Smile
2025	Crocetti	Grail Seeker	Here To Shock	El Vencedor	Sterling Express	Inflamed
2024	Waitak	Mercurial	Bonny Lass	La Crique	Bonny Lass	Mystic Park
2023	Imperatriz	Levante	Imperatriz	Levante	Dragon Leap	Maria Farina
2022	Entriviere	Levante	Levante	Marscarpone	Imperatriz	Buoyant
2021	Avantage	Avantage	Avantage	Avantage	Mascarpone	Summer Monsoon
2020	Julius	Avantage	Te Akau Shark	Avantage	Avantage	Prince Oz
2019	Santa Monica	Enzo's Lad	Melody Belle	Melody Belle	Endless Drama	Sheezallmine
2018	Volpe Veloce	Enzo's Lad	Start Wondering	Devise	Melody Belle	Prince Oz
2017	Start Wondering	Signify	Start Wondering	Kawi	Under the Moonlight	Carnival
2016	Ryan Mark	Adventador	Xtravagant	Volkstok 'n' barrel	Saracino	Reilly Lincoln
2015	In Style	Sacred Star	Sacred Star	Iamishwara	Addictive Habit	El Chico
2014	Bounding	Irish Fling	Viadana	Nashville	I Do	Soubrettes
2013	Fleur de Lune	Final Touch	Final Touch	Nashville	Postman's Daughter	Durham Town
2012	Atomic Force	Guiseppina	Veyron	Veyron	Fleur de Lune	King Montrose
2011	Miss Raggedy Ann	Mufhasa	Mufhasa	Keep The Peace	Fritzy Boy	El Chico
2010	A Gold Trail	Vonusti	Tavistock	Mufhasa	Bulginbaah	Coup Align
2009	Jacowils	Mufhasa	Mufhasa	Culminata	Bulginbaah	Coup Align
2008	Imananabaa	Seachange	Seachange	Alamosa	Jacowils	San Bernadino
2007	Donna Rosta	Darci Brahma	Darci Brahma	Sir Slick	Baltaine	Coup Bloomsbury
2006	Baldessarini	Gee I Jane	Kristov	Darci Brahma	not raced	Clifton Prince
2005	Recurring	Keeninsky	Sedecrem	Zveda	Irish Rover	Clifton Prince
2004	Vinaka	King's Chapel	Sedecrem	King's Chapel	El Duce	Opiki
2003	Egyptian Raine	Tit for Taat	Tit for Taat	Critic	King Keitel	Fingalbunt
2002	Sound the Alarm	Vinaka	Sunline	No Mean City	O'Malleys Boy	Ima Royal
2001	Fritz	Star of Gold	Sunline	Star Satire	The Message	Life Of Riley
2000	Cannsea	Fritz	Tall Poppy	Surface	The Message	Tooth
1999	Bawalakasana	Bawalakasana	Surface	Hero	What Can I Say	Joe Hero
1998	Coogee Walk	Vegas	Rebel	Centre Crest	Our Orb	Morgan Bay
1997	Kailey	O'Reilly	Avedon	It's My Sin	Adonia	Highanabove

Enzo's Lad which won the Telegraph Handicap in 2018 and 2019 was 2nd in 2020. El Chico was aged 11 when winning its second Stewards Stakes in 2011, a race record.

== Recent winners of other notable Weight for Age or open races ==
The following are the recent winners of other notable races.

Year	Thorndon Mile (Trentham) 1600m	Herbie Dykes Stakes (Te Rapa) 2000m	Bonecrusher New Zealand Stakes (Ellerslie) 2000m	Easter Handicap (Ellerslie) 1600m	TAB (Couplands) Mile (Riccarton) 1600m	Mufhasa Classic (Trentham) 1600m	Zabeel Classic (Ellerslie) 2000m
2026	Doctor Askar	Legarto	Legarto	Lupo Solitario	Coulthard		
2025	Provence	El Vencedor	El Vencedor	Doctor Askar	Mystic Park	Provence	Kingswood
2024	Puntura	Legarto	El Vencedor	Snazzytavi	Kopua	Ladies Man	Snazzytavi
2023	He's A Doozy	Sharp 'N' Smart	Prowess	White Noise	Puntura	Desert Lightning	Campionessa
2022	The Chosen One	Coventina Bay	Coventina Bay	Carolina Reaper	He's A Doozy	Prise De Fer	Defibrillate
2021	Melody Belle	Royal Performer	Melody Belle	Demonetization	Markus Aurelius	Two Illicit	Tiptronic
2020	The Mitigator	Tiptronic	Avantage	(no race due to COVID-19)	Hypnos	Rock On Wood	Concert Hall
2019	Shadows Cast	On The Rocks	Melody Belle	Endless Drama	True Enough	Wyndspelle	True Enough
2018	Stolen Dance	Lizzie L'Amour	Saint Emilion	Megablast	Te Akau Shark	Danzdanzdance	Danzdanzdance
2017	Thee Auld Floozie	Volkstok'n'barrell	Lizzie L'Amour	Seventh Up	Shadows Cast / Son Of Maher	Kawi	Authentic Paddy
2016	Kawi	Valley Girl	Volkstok'n'barrell	Sound proposition	Battle Time	Aide Memoire	Consensus
2015	Puccini	Soriano	Sakhee's Soldier	Pondarosa Miss	Addictive Habit	Julinsky Prince	Kawi
2014	A Touch Of Ruby	Costume	Silent Achiever	Albany Reunion	Addictive Habit	Shuka	Soriano
2013	Historian	Sangster	Ocean Park	Viadana	Scapolo	Shuka	Historian
2012	Say No More	Shez Sinsational	Scarlett Lady	Veyron	Nashville	Final Touch	Veyron
2011	Booming	Red Ruler	The Party Stand	Veyron	Platinum Prince	Mufhasa	Shez Sinsational
2010	Wall Street	Veloce Bella	Vosne Romanee	Time Keeper	Altered Image	We Can Say It Now	Booming

== Recent winners of major NZ 3-year-old races ==
The following are the recent winners of major races for 3-year-old horses.

- The Auckland Guineas was reduced from 2100 metres to 1600 metres in 2010. The race was not run in 2014 as the race moved from Boxing Day to New Year's Day.
- The Avondale Guineas was not run in 2010 due to the race being moved from Avondale where it was run in December over 1600 metres to Ellerslie where it is run in February over 2100 metres.
- The Wellington Guineas was moved from an October meeting in 2013 to a March meeting in 2015 and from 1500m to 1400m.

Year	Levin Classic (Otaki / Trentham) 1600m	Desert Gold Stakes (Trentham) 3YO fillies 1600m	Hawke's Bay Guineas (Hastings) 1400m	Auckland / Great Northern Guineas 2100m / 1600m	Waikato Guineas (Te Rapa) 2000m	Avondale Guineas 1600m / 2100m	Wellington Guineas (Trentham) 1500m / 1400m	New Zealand Derby (Ellerslie) 2400m	New Zealand 1000 Guineas (Riccarton) 3YO fillies 1600m	New Zealand 2000 Guineas (Riccarton) 1600m	New Zealand Oaks (Trentham) 3YO fillies 2400m
2026	La Dorado	Fairy Dream	Old Fashioned		Autumn Glory	That's Gold	Origin Of Love	Road To Paris	Angels Halo	Kumara Straight	Ohope Wins
2025	Savaglee	Leica Lucy	Magic Carpet	Well Written	Tuxedo	Thedoctoroflove	Vegas Queen	Willydoit	Well Written	Romanoff	Leica Lucy
2024	Quintessa	Sudbina	Savaglee	Pendragon	Ascend The Throne	Orchestral	Grail Seeker	Orchestral	Captured By Love	Savaglee	Pulchritudinous
2023	Romancing The Moon	Mazzolino	Lantern Way	Prowess	Loosespender	Desert Lightning	Cognito	Sharp 'N' Smart	Molly Bloom	Crocetti	Pennyweka
2022	Imperatriz	La Crique	Pier	Dark Destroyer	Field of Gold	La Crique	Shamus	Asterix	Legarto	Pier	Belle En Rouge
2021	Bonham	Force Of Will	Mana Nui	Rocket Spade	Tokorangi	Rocket Spade	Need I Say More	Rocket Spade	The Perfect Pink	Noverre	Amarelinha
2020	Travelling Light	Showbeel	Aegon	Dragon Leap	Two Illicit	Dragon Leap	Gold Bracelet	Sherwood Forest	Kahma Lass	Aegon	Jennifer Eccles
2019	Madison County	Secret Allure	Catalyst	Surely Sacred	Sponge Bob	Surely Sacred	Emily Margaret	Crown Prosecutor	Loire	Catalyst	Sentimental Miss
2018	Age Of Fire	Dijon Bleu	Madison County	Demonet ization	Xbox	On The Rocks	Scott Base	Vin De Dance	Media Sensation	Madison County	Savvy Coup
2017	Hall Of Fame	Nicoletta	Hard Merchandize	Swissta	Wyndspelle	Gingernuts	Saracino	Gingernuts	Hasahalo	Embellish	Bonneval
2016	Dukedom	Duchess Kate	Mongolian Falcon	Rangipo	Rangipo	Rangipo	The Justice League	Rangipo	La Dioso	Ugo Foscolo	Fanatic
2015	Gaultier	Platinum Witness	Amarula	Volkstock n barrel	Mongolian Khan	Mongolian Khan	Vespa	Mongolian Khan	Risque	Xtravagant	Savaria
2014	Recite	Moozoon	Turn Me Loose	not raced	Puccini	Puccini	not raced	Puccini	Platinum Witness	Turn Me Loose	Miss Mossman
2013	n/a	High Fashion	Sir Andrew	Puccini	Castizeberg	Valbuena	Sacred Park	Habibi	Costa Viva	Atlante	More Than Sacred
2012	Southern Lord	Quintessential	Sacred Falls	Habibi	Silent Achiever	Silent Achiever	Neo	Silent Achiever	Rollout The Carpet	Sacred Falls	Artistic
2011	Distill	Dating	Antonio Lombardo	Knight's Tour	Jimmy Choux	Icepin	President Lincoln	Jimmy Choux	Planet Rock	Rock "n" Pop	Midnight Oil
2010	We Can Say It Now	Keep The Peace	Jimmy Choux	Jimmy Choux	Zarzuela	not raced	Barside	Military Move	King's Rose	Jimmy Choux	Keep The Peace
2009	Eileen Dubh	Glamorous Girl	Keyora	Zarzuela	Easy Ryder	Joey Massino	Keyora	Coniston Bluebird	Katie Lee	Katie Lee	Jungle Rocket
2008	Altered Image	Keepa Cruisin	Tell A Tale	Le Baron	Nom Du Jeu	Tell A Tale	Skirmish	C'est La Guerre	Daffodil	Tell A Tale	Boundless
2007	Keepa Cruisin	Princess Coup	Alamosa	Prince Kaapstad	Upside Of Anger	Alamosa	Rios	Redoute's Dancer	Insouciant	The Pooka	Princess Coup
2006	Porotene Gem	Out Of Align	Jokers Wild	Santagostino	Wahid	Veloce Bella	Jokers Wild	Wahid	Dorabella	Magic Cape	Legs
2005	Wahid	Senorita Dane	Darci Brahma	Sculptor	not raced	Pulcinella	Darci Brahma	not raced	Seachange	Darci Brahma	Justa Tad
2004	Ambitious Owner	Pride Of The Class	Shastri	Magnetism	Sista	Mandela	Ambitious Owner	Xcellent	Justa Tad	Clean Sweep	Wharite Princess
2003	Russian Pearl	Stardane	Bridie Belle	Philamor	Philamor	Kainui Belle	Cut the Cake	Taatletail	King's Chapel	Bramble Ross	Lonestar Lady
2002	Bunker	not raced	Bunker	Sparkling Star	Super Kid	St Reims	Jack The Stripper	St Reims	The Jewel	Hustler	Vapour Trail
2001	Final Destination	Blackfock College	Vinaka	Leica Guv	Athens	Leica Guv	I Rock My World	Leica Guv	Final Destination	Master Belt	Tapildo
2000	Tit for Taat	Singalong	Singalong	Millennium	La Bella Dama	Danamite	Spring Rain	Hail	Elevenses	Tit For Taat	She's Country
1999	Buzz Lightyear	Thee Old Dragon	Buzz Lightyear	Ad Alta	The Fatz	Ad Alta	Marrok	Hades	Ad Alta	Buzz Lightyear	Savannah Success
1998	Tobruk	Pace Invader	So Casual	Danske	Figurehead	Just Call Me Sir	El Duce	So Casual	Pace Invader	Danske	Tycoon Lil
1997	Love De Tor	Alavana	Quality Kingdom		Crimson	Zonda	Old Tawny	Zonda	Tycoon Lil	Foxwood	Sawatdee
1996	O'Reilly	Tartan Belle	Batavian	Rodney Red	Great Command	Bubble	Batavian	Great Command	Emerald	Hero	Alacrity

== Recent winners of the New Zealand Triple Crown races ==
The New Zealand Triple Crown, also called the Hawke's Bay Triple Crown or Hastings Triple Crown as all three races are run there, consists of:

- The 1400m Proisir Plate, which was previously known as the Tarzino Trophy, Makfi Challenge Stakes and Mudgway Stakes
- The 1600m Howden Insurance Mile (Horlicks Plate), which was previously known as the Stony Bridge Stakes, Windsor Park Plate and Arrowfield Stud Plate
- The 2040m Livamol Spring Classic, which was previously known as the Kelt Capital Stakes.

Many of New Zealand's best Thoroughbred horses have raced in the various Triple Crown events. A number of horses managed to win two of the three races and some were beaten into second in the third leg. Seachange won two of the three legs of the Triple Crown in both 2006 and 2007. On 5 October 2019 Melody Belle became the first horse to win all three of the Hastings Triple Crown races.

Year	Proisir Plate (1400m)	Howden Insurance Mile (Horlicks Plate, 1600m)	Livamol Spring Classic (2040m)	Notes
2026	Well Written	Waitak	Waitak	
2025	Quintessa	Waitak	Waitak	Waitak was 11th in the Proisir Plate
2024	Grail Seeker	One Bold Cat	Snazzytavi	
2023	Skew Wiff	Mustang Valley	Ladies Man	
2022	Dark Destroyer	La Crique	Mustang Valley	
2021	Callsign Mav	Callsign Mav	Savy Yong Blonk	Callsign Mav did not contest the 2021 Spring Classic
2020	Callsign Mav	Melody Belle	Melody Belle	
2019	Melody Belle	Melody Belle	Melody Belle	Melody Belle is the first horse to win the Triple Crown
2018	Melody Belle	Melody Belle	Savvy Coup	Melody Belle did not contest the 2018 Spring Classic
2017	Close Up	Gingernuts	Wait a Sec	
2016	Kawi	Kawi	Willie Cazals	Kawi did not contest the 2016 Spring Classic
2015	Kawi	Julinsky Prince	Addictive Habit	
2014	I do	Pure Champion	Costume	
2013	Survived	Xanadu	Ransomed	
2012	Ocean Park	Mufhasa	Shez Sinsational	
2011	Mufhasa	Jimmy Choux	Jimmy Choux	Jimmy Choux was 2nd to Mufhasa by 1.8 lengths in the Makfi Challenge Stakes
2010	Keep the Peace	Wall Street	Wall Street	Wall Street was 2nd to Keep the Peace in the Mudgway by 0.1 lengths
2009	Tavistock	Daffodil	Vosne Romanee	
2008	Fritzy Boy	Princess Coup	Princess Coup	Princess Coup was 9th, by 5.1 lengths to Fritzy Boy
2007	Seachange	Seachange	Princess Coup	Seachange was 4th by 0.3 lengths to Princess Coup
2006	Seachange	Seachange	Legs	Seachange was 3rd by 0.9 lengths to Legs
2005	Xcellent	Miss Potential	Xcellent	Xcellent did not contest the 2005 Stony Bridge Stakes
2004	Starcraft	Starcraft	Balmuse	Starcraft was placed 2nd to Balmuse by 2.3 lengths
2003	Miss Potential	Irish Rover	Distinctly Secret	Due to bad weather the Mudgway was raced at Wanganui and the Windsor Park at Ōtaki
2002	Sunline	Hello Dolly	Prized Gem	
2001	Fritz	Hello Dolly	Cinder Bella	
2000	Cent Home	The Message	The Message	The Message was 10th in the Mudgway Stakes

== The Messara Report and the New Zealand Government's racing industry reforms ==
In April 2018 the New Zealand Government Minister for Racing, Rt Hon Winston Peters appointed an Australian, John Messara, to review the New Zealand racing industry's governance structures, and provide recommendations on future directions for the industry.

On 30 August 2018, the Minister released the report ("the Messara Report).

There was considerable media commentary regards the proposed closure of racetracks in smaller centres. During October 2018 feedback on the Messara Review was sought. In November 2018 a summary report of the submissions was compiled.

On 13 December 2018 the Minister for Racing announced a five-member Ministerial Advisory Committee to inform next steps on the Messara Review. Mr Peters appointed Dean McKenzie as chair, supported by Committee members Bill Birnie, Liz Dawson, Kristy McDonald and Sir Peter Vela.

New Zealand Thoroughbred Racing's (NZTR) Venue Plan was released in January 2019. The Report recommended:

- reducing the number of thoroughbred race tracks nationally from 48 to 27 by 2030.
- racing licences not be allocated to Stratford, Blenheim, Wairoa, Reefton, Hokitika, Waimate, Winton, Dargaville, Thames and Wyndham in the 2019/20 racing season.
- the Stratford Racing Club track close and its race meeting be held at the Pukekura Raceway in New Plymouth.

Feedback on the document was sought, with nine regional meetings held and 75 written submissions received. NZTR chief executive Bernard Saundry said the NZTR board considered the feedback and decided the Wairoa, Blenheim and Reefton tracks would receive a reprieve, for the 2019–20 season at least.

On 17 April 2019, the Minister for Racing announced that the New Zealand Government's Cabinet had agreed to the overall intent of the Messara Report and plans to implement reforms through two Bills to amend the Racing Act 2003. The first Bill, planned to be enacted by 1 July 2019, was to begin the process of structural reform and provide financial relief to the industry.

On 20 June 2019 the Racing Reform Bill passed its third reading and final reading in Parliament.

On 5 December 2019 the Minister for Racing introduced the Racing Industry Bill as the Government's final legislative response to the recommendations of the Messara Report. It was reported in the media that the Bill extinguished the freehold property rights of local racing club owners who would be forced to sell their courses, money from any sales would not be used in that community but instead transferred to develop clubs in bigger centres elsewhere.

== See also ==
- New Zealand Racing Hall of Fame
- New Zealand Horse of the Year
- Auckland Cup Week
- Wellington Racing Club
- Glossary of Australian and New Zealand punting
- List of Melbourne Cup winners
- Thoroughbred racing in Australia
- Harness racing in New Zealand
