= Vosne Romanee =

New Zealand-bred Thoroughbred racehorse

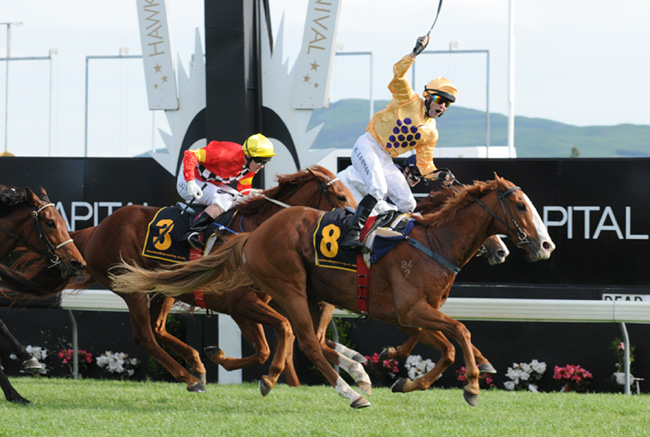
- Grandsire: Rahy (USA) 1985
- Dam: Madison Avenue (NZ) 1994
- Damsire: Morcon (GB) 1980
- Sex: Gelding
- Foaled: 17 September 2002 (age 22)
- Country: New Zealand
- Colour: Chestnut
- Breeder: Turnham Green Holdings Ltd
- Owner: Ian and Alana Smart Trust
- Trainer: Jeff Lynds
- Record: 48:9-7-3
- Earnings: $1,274,348

Major wins
- Kelt Capital Stakes (2009); Zabeel Classic (2009); New Zealand Stakes (2010)

Awards
- 2009/10 New Zealand Horse of the Year

Vosne Romanee (foaled 17 September 2002) is a three-time Group 1 winning New Zealand Horse.

Vosne Romanee was named after a wine region in France and was owned by Ian and Alana Smart Trust. He was trained by Jeff Lynds. Buddy Lammas and Opie Bosson were regular riders.

He rose to prominence as a seven-year-old in the 2009/10 season. His most significant win came as one of several longshots in the Kelt Capital Stakes in October 2009, and followed up with wins in the Zabeel Classic on Boxing Day and the New Zealand Stakes in March 2010.

The achievements were more notable as the three events were among the most competitive races in New Zealand that season and led to Vosne Romanee being named the New Zealand Horse of the Year for the 2009/10 season.

== Notable performances ==
- 20 May 2008 - 1st in the Rangitikei Gold Cup (listed open 1600m, Awapuni, Michael Walker) beating Shamrock Star and Towzan
- 12 November 2008 - 2nd in the Coupland's Bakeries Mile (G2, 1600m, Riccarton Park Racecourse, Michael Coleman) behind Mufhasa with Sterling Prince 3rd
- 14 March 2009 - 2nd in the Thompson Handicap (G3 2000m, Awapuni, Buddy Lammas) behind Jonbalena with Megapins 3rd.
- 28 March 2009 - 4th in the Awapuni Gold Cup (Buddy Lammas) behind MacO'Reilly, Sir Slick and Spectacular Icon
- 3 October 2009 - 1st in the Kelt Capital Stakes (Buddy Lammas) beating Ginga Dude and Miss Maren
- 26 December 2009 - 1st in the Zabeel Classic (Matthew Cameron) beating Red Ruler and Tell A Tale
- 28 February 2010 - 4th in the Otaki-Maori Weight for Age (Opie Bosson) behind Mufhasa, Hold It Harvey and Daffodil
- 13 March 2010 - 1st in the New Zealand Stakes (Opie Bosson) beating Harris Tweed and Tell A Tale
- 3 April 2010 - 4th in the Awapuni Gold Cup (Opie Bosson) behind Sir Slick and Manonamission
- 24 April 2010 - 4th in the Queen Elizabeth Stakes (ATC) (Opie Bosson) behind Road to Rock and Triple Honour
- 12 March 2011 - 3rd in the New Zealand Stakes (Hayden Tinsley) behind The Party Stand and Adaline

== See also ==
- Thoroughbred racing in New Zealand
