= Leica Guv =

New Zealand-bred Thoroughbred racehorse

- Sire: Deputy Governor
- Grandsire: Master Willie
- Dam: Leica Or Not
- Damsire: Kendor
- Sex: Gelding
- Foaled: 22 August 1998
- Country: New Zealand
- Colour: Bay
- Breeder: R A Scarborough
- Owner: D S & Mrs E Browne
- Trainer: Jeff McVean
- Record: 44:10-2-5
- Earnings: $507,689

Major wins
- New Zealand Derby (2001)
- Last updated on July 3, 2007

Leica Guv (foaled 22 August 1998) is a thoroughbred racehorse who in a brilliant three-year-old season won the New Zealand Derby in 2001. Unfortunately he was never able to match the ability he showed in 2001 in the remainder of his career.

Leica Guv won all of his first six starts on right-handed tracks, and overcame his dislike of running the other way around to run a courageous third to Master Belt in the New Zealand 2000 Guineas.

After winning his first two races, including the Northland Breeders Stakes at Ruakaka, his problem with left-handed tracks first made itself obvious with his fifth placing as favourite in the Wanganui Guineas, followed by fourth in the Hawke's Bay Guineas. He then made up for those disappointments running his preferred way around with an impressive win in the Great Northern Guineas at Ellerslie before heading south for the 2000 Guineas, which was probably one of his best performances.

Back right-handed again, he won three races in a row including the Avondale Guineas and the Derby, the latter of which was a spectacular performance in which he led all the way and was never threatened in cruising away to a three-length victory.

Following the Derby he ran with some credit in Sydney, finishing fourth in the Canterbury Guineas, but after that he was unable to recreate anything like his best form, with the exception of a dead-heat for first with Penny Gem in the Group 2 Counties Cup of 2003.

== See also ==
- Thoroughbred racing in New Zealand
