= Hector Gray (jockey) =

New Zealand jockey and horse trainer

Hector Edwards Gray (18 November 1885 – 8 March 1957) was a New Zealand jockey and horse trainer. He was born in Albert Town, Central Otago, New Zealand on 18 November 1885.

== See also ==
- Thoroughbred racing in New Zealand
