= Wahid (horse) =

New Zealand Thoroughbred Racehorse

- Sire: Almutawakel
- Grandsire: Machiavellian
- Dam: Rory's Helen
- Damsire: Rory's Jester
- Sex: Male
- Foaled: 7 November 2002
- Country: New Zealand
- Colour: Chestnut
- Breeder: Trelawney Stud
- Owner: N H & R T Stanley
- Trainer: Allan Sharrock
- Record: 22:9-4-2
- Earnings: $1,022,060

Major wins
- New Zealand Derby (2006); Levin Classic (2005); New Zealand Bloodstock Classique (2005)
- Last updated on July 3, 2007

Wahid (foaled 7 November 2002) is a Thoroughbred racehorse who won the New Zealand Derby in 2006.

== Background ==
Wahid is a Chestnut Gelding foaled in New Zealand and bred by Trelawney Stud. His sire is Great Britain's bay horse, Almutawakel. His dame is Rory's Helen, a New Zealand bay mare owned by BS Gillovic Family Trust.

== Racing career ==
Wahid had his debut win at Trentham (covering the 1000m in 57.27 seconds) in December 2004 with Jockey Hayden Tinsley. With wins in the Wakefield Challenge Stakes, New Zealand Bloodstock Classique and Group 1, placings in both the Diamond Stakes and Manawatu Sires' Produce Stakes, he was rated among the very best of his generation at age two and was labelled a Derby contender.

After a short break over the summer months, he started his Derby campaign at Woodville before returning to stakes company. He won the Wellington Stakes, but had the win rescinded for interference caused to the third horse Abbey Drive. He then had a winning sequence in group races of three, culminating with the Derby win in March.

During his summer-autumn Derby campaign, he reversed the style of racing that he had used to great effect as a two-year-old and spring three-year-old. Instead of coming from off the pace as he had in those two campaigns, he set the pace and led all the way in the Waikato Guineas, Championship Stakes and Derby.

His five-year-old season started with a win at Ellerslie followed up with a third behind champion galloper Xcellent in the Sir James Fletcher Stakes. However, he was found to have a virus at his next start, and did not race for the rest of the season. His six-year-old campaign started with two unplaced runs, followed by a fast-finishing fourth in the Lightning Stakes at Trentham. He was officially retired in November 2009.

== See also ==
- Thoroughbred racing in New Zealand
