= Puccini (horse) =

New Zealand-bred Thoroughbred racehorse

- Sire: Encosta De Lago
- Grandsire: Fairy King
- Dam: Miss Opera
- Damsire: Paris Opera
- Sex: Colt
- Foaled: 2010
- Country: New Zealand
- Colour: Bay
- Breeder: Paul and Cushla Smithies, Monovale Farm
- Owner: Monovale Farm
- Trainer: Peter & Jacob McKay
- Record: 24:8-2-4
- Earnings: NZ$676,925

Major wins
- Thorndon Mile (2015); New Zealand Derby (2014); Avondale Guineas (2014); Waikato Guineas (2014); Great Northern Guineas (2013)
- Last updated on 2 March 2014

Puccini (foaled 25 September 2010) is a New Zealand thoroughbred racehorse. On 1 March 2014 he won the 139th running of the New Zealand Derby.

Born in 2010, Puccini is a half-brother to six-time Group 1 winner Sir Slick. He is also closely related to stakes-winning and Group 1-placed sprinter Little Wonder, who won a Group 3 event on the undercard on the day Puccini won the Derby.

Taking time to grow and mature, Puccini took eight starts to win his first race. After that he won five of his next seven - including the Group 1 Derby and three Group 2 races. With his increasingly impressive and dominant victories in the Great Northern Guineas, Waikato Guineas and Avondale Guineas, Puccini became renowned for his bold front-running style. It was a tactic that was widely expected to be repeated in the Derby. But Puccini was slow out of the gates and was fourth last in the 18-horse field after the first 500m. He made a spectacular move halfway down the back stretch, sweeping to the lead. He kicked strongly at the turn and held on for an impressive and convincing two-length win over Rising Romance, with Glorious Lad another three lengths away in third.

Puccini was rated by rider Michael Walker as the best horse he had ever ridden.

Puccini won the 2015 Thorndon Mile at Group One level, the Thompson Handicap (Trentham Racecourse) and Merial Metric Mile (Awapuni) at Group Three as well as a number of placings in Group races in New Zealand and Australia.

== Stud career ==
From 2017 Puccini commenced stud duties. He stood at Mapperley Stud, Matamata.

Notable progeny include:

- Full of Sincerity
- Le Villi
- Wolfgang, winner of the 2025 Wellington Cup

== See also ==
- 2014 New Zealand Derby
- Thoroughbred racing in New Zealand
