= Linda Jones (jockey) =

New Zealand jockey (born 1952)

Linda Jones MBE
Personal information
- Full name: Linda Christine Jones
- Born: 1952 (age 73–74) Auckland, New Zealand
- Occupation: Jockey

Horse racing career
- Sport: Horse racing
- Career wins: 65

Racing awards
- New Zealand Racing Personality of the Year (1979)

Honours
- New Zealand Sports Hall of Fame (1990); New Zealand Racing Hall of Fame (2010)

Linda Christine Jones MBE (born 1952) is a New Zealand former thoroughbred horse racing jockey. She was the first woman to be granted a race licence in New Zealand in 1977 and the first in Australasia to achieve four victories in a single day the following year. Jones finished second in the 1978/1979 Jockey Premiership with 18 winners by Christmas 1978. She later became the first woman to ride a Derby winner in each of the Australasia, Europe, and North America continents and the first female to beat professional male entrants at an Australian-registered event. Injury prompted Jones to retire in 1980; she had achieved 65 victories within 18 months. She is an inductee of both the New Zealand Sports Hall of Fame and the New Zealand Racing Hall of Fame.

== Career ==
In 1952, Jones was born in Auckland, New Zealand. She partook in the 1970 Powder Puff Derby as one of eleven jockeys in an era when women were not allowed to be jockeys. Jones was later invited to compete at a meet in Brazil in 1975 and told her husband Alan Jones she wanted to be a jockey. She went on to win the 1975 Qantas International Women's Handicap at Rotorua, and was considered New Zealand's leading female jockey. In September 1976, Jones became the first woman to apply for an apprentice jockey licence with the New Zealand Racing Conference (NZRC). The application was rejected on the grounds of her being "too old, married and not strong enough"; they felt she would claim men's jockey's winnings and would not receive the appropriate dressing rooms. Jones and her husband were prepared to go to court, and she led a campaign for improved equality within the racing industry, for which she received hate mail. The government of New Zealand later passed legislation in the form of the Human Rights Commission Act 1977 banning sexual discrimination. Following heavy pressure from the racing journalist John Costello, the NZRC approved female racing licences in July 1977, and Jones became both the first woman to be granted a New Zealand race licence and the first woman to compete against men in the country.

She was apprenticed to her husband, and required to stay apprenticed until 1982 per New Zealand racing rules with her earnings put into a Racing Conference trust. She began riding professionally on 12 August 1978, at Matamata. Jones achieved her first winner at Te Rapa, and received nationwide attention for becoming the first woman in Australasia to win four times on the same day at a September 1978 meeting at Te Rapa. She was also the first woman in the North Island to claim victory. Jones rode 18 winners by Christmas 1978 and was second in the 1978/1979 Jockey Premiership. She went on to ride Holy Toledo to victory in the 1979 Grade II Wellington Derby that took place that January, becoming the first woman to ride a Derby winner in each of the Australasia, Europe, and North America continents. Jones later became the first woman to ride a winner over professional male entrants at an Australian-registered event when she rode Pay The Purple to a first-place finish at the 1979 Labour Day Cup at Brisbane in May 1979. That year, she sustained two separate injuries by fracturing her rib and puncturing her lung. Jones had achieved 65 victories as a jockey within 18 months.

In March 1980, she sustained a suspected broken pelvis, a fractured vertebrae atop her spine, sprained wrist and concussion in an accident while training at her husband's Cambridge establishment. Jones accepted that she possibly could never fully recover to peak fitness and retired from racing in September 1980. She went into semi-retirement and began training race horses and achieved success with them in Australia in the 1980s.

== Personal life ==
She and her husband have a daughter who was born in 1977. Jones was appointed MBE in the 1979 Queen's Birthday Honours "for her contribution to racing and women's rights".

== Profile ==
Jones was listed between 45 and 46 kg (99 and 101 lb). In 1979, she sought not to enter one or two events of a single meeting as she combined her career with a holiday. Jones wrote the autobiography, The Linda Jones Story, in 1979.

== See also ==
- Thoroughbred racing in New Zealand

== Honours ==
She was nominated for the 1978 New Zealand Sportswoman of the Year by the nation's South Pacific Television channel, and received the New Zealand Racing Personality of the Year Award from the Prime Minister Robert Muldoon the following year. In 1990, Jones was added to the sporting category of the New Zealand Sports Hall of Fame. She was the first woman to be inducted into the New Zealand Racing Hall of Fame in March 2010. In April 2019, a retirement village on Hamilton's River Road was named after Jones in celebration of her sporting achievements.
