= The Phantom (horse) =

New Zealand-bred Thoroughbred racehorse

- Sire: Noble Bijou
- Grandsire: Vaguely Noble
- Dam: The Fantasy
- Damsire: Gate Keeper
- Sex: Gelding
- Foaled: 1985
- Country: New Zealand
- Colour: Bay
- Trainer: Murray Baker, Noel Eales
- Record: 39: 10-6-7
- Earnings: A$1,689,224

Major wins
- Underwood Stakes (1990); Mackinnon Stakes (1993); Cambridge Stud International Stakes (1994)

Awards
- New Zealand Horse of the Year (1994)
- Last updated on 28 November 2009

The Phantom was a Group One winning New Zealand Thoroughbred racehorse who made several trips to Australia, and completed a remarkable comeback later in his career.

== Initial racing career ==
From three to five, trained by Murray Baker, The Phantom's highlights included wins in the Memsie and the Underwood Stakes, and he was third in the 1989 Caulfield Cup and second in the 1990 Melbourne Cup.

In 1991, aged five, The Phantom broke down and spent 2 1/2 years off the scene.

== Comeback from injury ==
In the spring of 1993 The Phantom returned to racing as an eight-year-old trained by Noel Eales and immediately won the Group Three Trust Bank Central Stakes over 1600 m at Wanganui. Later in the same campaign, after finishing third in the Caulfield Cup, The Phantom won the Mackinnon Stakes.

He started in the 1993 Melbourne Cup but did not favour the rain affected track and jockey Jimmy Cassidy said "he was travelling like a beaten horse even early in the race". He was placed eighth behind Vintage Crop, Te Akau Nick and Mercator.

He reappeared in the new year to win the Cambridge Stud International Stakes from Ligeiro and Gaytrice.

He also won the 1993–1994 New Zealand Horse of the Year Award.

The Phantom returned to Australia for a final campaign, as a nine-year-old, in the autumn of 1995 but was unable to recapture his best form.

== Family ==
The Phantom, a gelding by Noble Bijou out of The Fantasy, was a member of one of New Zealand's best-known Thoroughbred families bred by A.G (Tony), K.J. (Joe), M.C. (Martin), and P.R. (Ray) Dennis (the Dennis brothers). This family features a number of horses whose names begin with 'The', including:

- The Pixie (1968, Mellay - The Kurd): 1981 Broodmare of the Year (who produced The Twinkle and The Fantasy).
- The Fantasy (1974, Gate Keeper - The Pixie): 1994 Broodmare of the Year.
- The Twinkle (1975, Gate Keeper - The Pixie).
- The Dimple (1977, Noble Bijou - The Pixie).
- The Phantom Chance (1989, Noble Bijou - The Fantasy): 1993 Cox Plate winner and a full-brother to The Phantom.
- The Grin (1992, Grosvenor - The Dimple): 2003 Broodmare of the Year.
- The Jewel (1999, O'Reilly - The Grin): winner of the 2002 New Zealand 1000 Guineas, New Zealand International Stakes, Doomben Roses as well as runner-up in the New Zealand 2000 Guineas, New Zealand Oaks and Queensland Oaks.
- The Chosen One (2015, Savabeel - The Glitzy One): winner of the 2022 Thorndon Mile.

== See also ==
- Thoroughbred racing in New Zealand
- Thoroughbred racing in Australia
