= Great Command =

New Zealand-bred Thoroughbred racehorse

- Sire: Marscay
- Grandsire: Biscay
- Dam: Tisolde
- Damsire: Tights
- Sex: Gelding
- Foaled: 31 August 1993
- Country: New Zealand
- Colour: Chestnut
- Breeder: Waikato Stud
- Owner: H J & J Chan, R R McAnulty & D Tsang
- Trainer: Michael Moroney
- Record: 10:7-0-2
- Earnings: $388,508

Major wins
- New Zealand Derby (1996); Whakanui Stud International (1997)
- Last updated on July 3, 2007

Great Command (foaled 31 August 1993) is a Thoroughbred racehorse who never finished further back than fifth in his career and won the New Zealand Derby in 2000, giving trainer Mike Moroney the first of his three New Zealand Derby victories to date and owner Rob McAnulty the first of his two.

After being fifth on debut on a heavy track, Great Command won four races on end including the Waikato Guineas and Derby Trial. After finishing third to Bubble in the Avondale Guineas he returned to his winning way in the Derby, recording his fifth win from seven career starts. The Derby win had Darren Beadman in the saddle. The third placegetter, Captain Moonlight, won a Group 1 against older horses the following week.

Five wins from seven starts became seven from nine as he returned a month later with a Group 3 win at Ellerslie and then the Group 1 Whakanui Stud International at Te Rapa against the older horses.

What turned out to be his last career start came next, with Great Command finishing third behind Intergaze and Might And Power in the Canterbury Guineas.

In all he won seven of his ten starts and was only unplaced once, in his debut on a wet track.
