= Baghdad Note =

New Zealand Thoroughbred racehorse

Baghdad Note (NZ)
- Sire: Kurdistan (GB)
- Grandsire: Tehran (GB)
- Dam: Fair Note (NZ)
- Damsire: Fairs Fair (GB)
- Sex: Gelding
- Foaled: 1965
- Died: 1992
- Country: New Zealand
- Colour: Grey
- Owner: E C S Falconer
- Trainer: R Heasley
- Record: 64:13–15-7

Major wins
- Melbourne Cup (1970); P.J. O'Shea Stakes (1973); Sandown Cup (1973)
- Last updated on 14 April 2020

Baghdad Note (1965−1992) was a New Zealand Thoroughbred racehorse, who won the 1970 Melbourne Cup and was ridden by Midge Didham.

== Background ==
He was sired by Kurdistan (GB), his dam Fair Note (NZ) was by Fairs Fair (GB).

== Racing career ==
Given most of his previous wins in New Zealand had been on wet tracks Baghdad Note was dismissed before the 1970 Cup as a 'mud-lark'. Despite his solid dead-heat third in the Caulfield Cup and a fifth placing in the Mackinnon Stakes he was sent out by punters a 25/1 chance in the Cup. He duly won the race by ¾ of a length becoming just the third grey to win the race after Toryboy in 1865 and Hiraji in 1947. He was strapped by young New Zealander, David Newman.

After a lengthy break from racing due to injury, Baghdad Note was leased by young trainer Terry Millard at Kilmore, who gradually returned the horse to race fitness. A stirring win at Sandown in 1973 was Baghdad Note's first metropolitan success since the Melbourne Cup. He also won the Sandown Cup soon afterwards. The horse featured in the 1973 Adelaide Cup, running second to Tavel, and then went to Queensland where he won the O'Shea stakes. He then started in the Brisbane Cup, when, despite breaking down again nearing the home turn, he still finished in third place.

== Retirement ==
Retired from racing for good, Baghdad Note became a clerk of the course horse at Flemington, then later a police horse.

== See also ==
- Thoroughbred racing in New Zealand
