= Sir Slick =

New Zealand-bred Thoroughbred racehorse

- Sire: Volksraad
- Grandsire: Green Desert
- Dam: Miss Opera
- Damsire: Paris Opera
- Sex: Gelding
- Foaled: 2001
- Country: New Zealand
- Colour: Bay
- Breeder: Monovale Holdings Ltd
- Owner: Ms F B Crimmins & G A Nicholson
- Trainer: Graeme Nicholson & Paul Allbon, Te Aroha
- Record: 151-22-22-17
- Earnings: NZ$ 2,042,177

Major wins
- Thorndon Mile (2007, 2009); Awapuni Gold Cup (2007, 2008, 2010); New Zealand Stakes (2008); Zabeel Classic (2007); New Zealand International Stakes (2007); Otaki-Maori Weight for Age (2007); Japan New Zealand Trophy (2006, 2007); Tauranga Stakes (2006, 2009); Anniversary Handicap (2007); Anzac 1600 (2006)

Awards
- Champion Middle Distance Horse of the Year (2007); Most Popular Horse (2007)

Sir Slick (foaled 2001) is a bay gelding Thoroughbred racehorse by Volksraad from the Paris Opera mare Miss Opera. The New Zealand bred Sir Slick was the winner of Six Group One races in New Zealand and he also raced in Australia, Singapore and Hong Kong.

== Racing career ==
Bred by Monovale Holdings Limited, Sir Slick was a NZ$48,000 purchase from Mapperley Stud at the 2003 Select Colts Karaka Yearling Sale by Graeme Nicholson.

Sir Slick was also known as the War Horse or the Iron Horse and he became one of the country's most popular racehorses of his time due to his success and ability to withstand long racing campaigns.

His major victories included the:

- 2007 Awapuni Gold Cup (Bruce Herd, 59kg) from All Square and Arabian Nights.
- 2008 Awapuni Gold Cup (Bruce Herd, 59) from Chettak and Butch James.
- 2010 Awapuni Gold Cup (Samantha Collett, 58) from Manonamission and Red Ruler.
- 2007 International Stakes (Opie Bosson, 59) from Sharvasti and Kingsinga.
- 2008 New Zealand Stakes (Bruce Herd, 59) from Ombre Rose and Dezigna.
- 2007 Otaki-Maori Weight for Age (Bruce Herd) from Jokers Wild and Shinzig.
- 2007 Thorndon Mile (Opie Bosson, 57) from Pins 'N' Needles and Bonjour.
- 2009 Thorndon Mile (David Walsh, 58) from Striker and Cuminate.
- 2007 Zabeel Classic (Bruce Herd, 59) from Xcellent and Dezigna.

As well as winning the Awapuni Gold Cup three times, Sir Slick was also second to MacO'Reilly in 2009.

While not winning outside of New Zealand, he ran third in the 2009 Doomben Cup in Australia and ran fifth in the Singapore International Cup. His most recognised achievement involves being awarded the title of New Zealand's Champion Middle Distance Racehorse of the year 2006/07. In that season he was also voted as the Most Popular Horse of the season, and he was runner-up in the overall Horse of the Year voting.

Sir Slick made an appearance in a substantial 151 races, racing in nine seasons between the ages of 2 and 10. Of the 151 races, including his overseas starts, he saw the winners circle 22 times and has earned over NZ$2 million in prize money internationally.

He was retired after finishing last in the 2012 Awapuni Gold Cup.

== Pedigree ==
The dam of Sir Slick, Miss Opera, was the winner of 6 races including the Listed Castletown Stakes.

His younger half-brother Puccini won the 2013 Great Northern Guineas, Group 1 2014 New Zealand Derby, Avondale Guineas, Waikato Guineas and 2015 Thorndon Mile and Thompson Handicap. In 2017 Puccini commenced stud duties at Mapperley Stud.

Pedigree of Sir Slick (NZ)
Sire Volksraad (GB) 1988	Green Desert	Danzig	Northern Dancer
Sire Volksraad (GB) 1988	Green Desert	Danzig	Pas De Nom
Sire Volksraad (GB) 1988	Green Desert	Foreign Courier	Sir Ivor
Sire Volksraad (GB) 1988	Green Desert	Foreign Courier	Courtly Dee
Sire Volksraad (GB) 1988	Celtic Assembly	Secretariat	Bold Ruler
Sire Volksraad (GB) 1988	Celtic Assembly	Secretariat	Somethingroyal
Sire Volksraad (GB) 1988	Celtic Assembly	Welsh Garden	Welsh Saint
Sire Volksraad (GB) 1988	Celtic Assembly	Welsh Garden	Garden Of Eden
Dam Miss Opera (NZ) 1992	Paris Opera	Marscay	Biscay
Dam Miss Opera (NZ) 1992	Paris Opera	Marscay	Heart Of Market
Dam Miss Opera (NZ) 1992	Paris Opera	Adelette	Baguette
Dam Miss Opera (NZ) 1992	Paris Opera	Adelette	Adelena
Dam Miss Opera (NZ) 1992	Brierley	Sir Godfrey	Riverman
Dam Miss Opera (NZ) 1992	Brierley	Sir Godfrey	Glaneuse
Dam Miss Opera (NZ) 1992	Brierley	Justaz Wealthy	Resurgent
Dam Miss Opera (NZ) 1992	Brierley	Justaz Wealthy	So Wealthy

== See also ==
- Thoroughbred racing in New Zealand
