= Midge Didham =

New Zealand and Australian jockey

Ernest John "Midge" Didham (born 1945 in Mosgiel, New Zealand) is a retired jockey and horse trainer. Midge's father, Arthur, was a top-class jockey and trained at Wingatui. Midge was the leading New Zealand jockey in the 1969–70 season with 99 wins. He shifted to Australia after he rode Igloo, trained by his father, to finish second to Silver Knight in the 1971 Melbourne Cup.

Some of the major wins during Didham's career include:

- 1965 Wellington Cup on Eiffel Tower
- 1970 Melbourne Cup on Baghdad Note
- 1971 Turnbull Stakes at Flemington and 1971 Coongy Handicap at Caulfield on Igloo
- 1971 Auckland Cup on Artifice, trained by his brother Jim Didham at Otaki
- 1977 Oakleigh Plate on Merger
- 1980 Moonee Valley Gold Cup on Tai Salute
- 1980 Caulfield Cup on Ming Dynasty
- 1981 Caulfield Cup on Silver Bounty

Didham retired from riding in 1985 and then trained in Melbourne for 20 years.

Didham's sons, John and Paul Didham, were also jockeys. Paul went on to become a racing official and chief starter in Victoria. He would go on to release the field for the Caulfield Cup, the race his father won twice as a jockey.

== See also ==
- Thoroughbred racing in New Zealand
