= Thorndon Mile =

- Class: Group II
- Location: Trentham; Wellington, New Zealand
- Race type: Thoroughbred - Flat racing
- Website: www.trentham.co.nz

Race information
- Distance: 1,600 metres
- Surface: Turf
- Track: Left-handed
- Qualification: Open
- Purse: $500,000 (2026)

The Thorndon Mile (formally WRC George Adams Handicap) is a Group Two (G2) Thoroughbred horse race contested at Trentham Racecourse by the Wellington Racing Club.

The race used to be run on Wellington Cup day, traditionally the last Saturday of January. However it has been moved to earlier in January, on the same day as the Trentham Stakes.

This race was known as the WRC George Adams Handicap until 1983. It was also known as the Jarden Mile or Jarden Morgan Mile while sponsored by that organisation over the 1984-1991 period. Other sponsors have included Hutt Valley Cartage and Harcourts real estate.

== Notable winners ==
The Thorndon Mile has been won by many of the best horses in New Zealand, such as:

- Alamosa, winner of the 2007 ARC Diamond Stakes and the 2008 Otaki-Maori Weight for Age and Toorak Handicap. Also sire of Kirramosa, winner of the 2013 VRC Oaks.
- Grey Way
- Kawi, winner of seven Group One races
- McGinty
- Melody Belle
- Sir Slick
- Wall Street, winner of the 2010 Windsor Park Plate, Spring Classic and Emirates Stakes

== History ==
The Thorndon Mile was downgraded from Group 1 (G1) to Group 2 (G2) status for the 2026 racing season, following a review by the Asian Pattern Committee.

== Race results ==
| Year | Winner | Jockey | Trainer(s) | Owner(s) | Time | Second place | Third |
|---|---|---|---|---|---|---|---|
| 2026 | Doctor Askar 53 | Joe Doyle | Joanne Moss | Joanne & Mrs R Jill Moss | 1:36.50 (soft) | Marotiri Molly 53.5 | Belles Beau 53 |
| 2025 | Provence 53 | Samantha Spratt | Stephen Marsh | T V Rider & Social Racing Ellerslie Winners Circle Syndicate | 1:35.67 (good) | Qali Al Farrasha 53 | Town Cryer 55.5 |
| 2024 | Puntura 57 | Craig Grylls | Robbie Patterson, New Plymouth | Carole & John Lynskey | 1:36.05 (soft) | El Vencedor 56 | Lady Telena 53 |
| 2023 | He's A Doozy 57 | Kozzi Asano | Lisa Latta | M Schirnack, N & A Thompson, S Platt, J & S Dunnett, M McNeill, S Dais, P Shearer, L Purvis, K McHugh, D Masters, S Edgerton, E Tomlins & W Dixon | 1.39.73 (heavy) | Sharp 'N' Smart 53.5 | Lightning Jack 55 |
| 2022 | The Chosen One 55 | Matthew Cameron | Murray Baker & Andrew Forsman | R L Bonnington, A G, C P, G, K J, Mrs P A & P R Dennis, Miss J L Dunlop, D G Forde, P M Jeffares, P Johnstone, G R Miller, G J Popham, Ravelston Stud Ltd, G R Redington, T V Rider & Mrs N C Robertson | 1:36.05 (good) | Coventina Bay 55 | Mali Ston 57 |
| 2021 | Melody Belle 57 | Opie Bosson | Jamie Richards, Matamata | Fortuna Melody Belle Syndicate | 1:38.05 (good) | Sinarahma 53.5 | Deerfield 55 |
| 2020 | The Mitigator 56 | Shaun McKay | Peter McKay, Matamata | RP Davis, TE Luke, N Butterfield, PT Fenwick, JP Hopkins | 1:35.47 (good) | Wyndspelle 58 | Yearn 55 |
| 2019 | Shadows Cast 58 | Jason Waddell | Mark Oulaghan, Awapuni | Ron Cunningham | 1:35.17 | Wyndspelle 55 | Watch This Space 55 |
| 2018 | Stolen Dance 53 | Samantha Spratt | Murray Baker & Andrew Forsman, Cambridge | GA Shand | 1:36.48 | Watch This Space 55 | Hiflyer 57 |
| 2017 | Thee Auld Floozie 53.5 | Rosie Myers | Stephen Marsh, Cambridge | P D Craighead, L G Ford, S B Marsh, M C Roughead, Two Fat Cows Syndicate, J G & Mrs S K Young | 1:35.03 | Prince Of Passion 55 | Abidewithme 55 |
| 2016 | Kawi 59 | Leith Innes | Allan Sharrock, New Plymouth | AA Baeyertz, JP Goodin, GA MacDonald, GH Phillips & Est late RW Sharrock | 1:35.16 | Stolen Dance 55 | Sports Illustrated 55 |
| 2015 | Puccini 57 | Danielle Johnson | Peter & Jacob McKay, Matamata | Monovale Holdings | 1:34.11 | Soriano 56 | Mighty Solomon 55 |
| 2014 | A Touch Of Ruby 52 | Craig Grylls | Stephen Autridge, Matamata | The Whitby Bloodstock Trust | 1:34.53 | Costume 52 | Sacred Star 53 |
| 2013 | Historian 53 | Rosie Myers | Gary Alton, Cambridge | Ngai Chun-Hung | 1:34.51 | Lady Kipling 58.5 | Miss Pelear 53.5 |
| 2012 | Say No More 52 | Rosie Myers | Paul Duncan, Cambridge | T N Boys, D B Capes, P G Harris, B G Hutchinson & R W Mackenzie | 1:37.69 | Postmans Daughter 56 | Jetset Lad 52 |
| 2011 | Booming 57 | Masa Tanaka | Jeff Lynds, Awapuni | DR Frampton & GKV Holdings Limited | 1:34.96 | Dasoudi 51 | Eileen Dubh 52.5 |
| 2010 | Wall Street 55 | Buddy Lammas | Jeff Lynds, Awapuni | G G Syndicate, Limited, G K V Holdings Limited & M A Head | 1:33.86 | Tavistock 56 | Mill Duckie 54.5 |
| 2009 | Sir Slick 58 | David Walsh | Graeme Nicholson, Te Aroha | BN Brown & GA Nicholson | 1:34.26 | Striker 51.5 | Culminate 56 |
| 2008 | Alamosa 57.5 | Paul Taylor | Peter McKay, Matamata | TE Luke, Mrs K & PN McKay | 1:35.18 | Dezigna 57.5 | Final Reality 54.5 |
| 2007 | Sir Slick 57 | Opie Bosson | Graeme Nicholson, Te Aroha | BN Brown & GA Nicholson | 1:34.20 | Pins ‘N’ Needles 53 | Bonjour 53 |
| 2006 | Macavelli Miss 54 | Mark Hills | Roger James, Cambridge | GR, KR & Mrs MJ Downey | 1:34.10 | O’Borio 53 | Penitentiary 54.5 |
| 2005 | Maroofity 52.5 | Lisa Cropp | Mark Walker, Matamata | Tauranga Racing Syndicate | 1:34.73 | Zvezda 55.5 | Lashed 54.5 |
| 2004 | Sir Kinloch 53.5 | Lee Rutherford | Colin Jillings & Richard Yuill, Takanini | HS, HS & SS Dyke | 1:36.84 | Sedecrem 57 | Elendil 50 |
| 2003 | Zvezda 55 | Lance O'Sullivan | Kay Lane, Ruakaka | KDH Lane | 1:35.69 | Rosina Lad 55 | Travellin’ Man 52 |
| 2002 | Giovana 56.5 | Peter Johnson | Carol Marshall, Cambridge | CA Marshall | 1:33.92 | Cent Home 56 | Hail 58 |
| 2001 | Tall Poppy 54 | David Walsh | Noel Eales, Awapuni | GB & RS Fell | 1:35.20 | Giovana 54 | Volkaire 55 |
| 2000 | Pace Invader 51.5 | Paul Taylor | Alvin Clark, Takanini | PR Dickinson, AR & EJ Johnson & CT Wintle | 1:34.34 | Skoozi 52 | Surface 56.5 |
| 1999 | Surface 52 | Noel Harris | Noel Eales, Awapuni | ND Eales & JD & Mrs PM Willis | 1:34.88 | Bluebird The Word 52 | Fatal 52 |
| 1998 | Fayreform 49.5 | Opie Bosson | Stephen Autridge, Matamata | Haunui Farm Limited & GH Madill | 1:35.63 | Des's Dream 50 | Rough Legend 53 |
| 1997 | Winning Wave 48 | Lee Rutherford | Frank & Craig Richie, Takanini | CR Edkins, RB Fickling, BW Freeman & RH Jensen | 1:34.29 | Jazzac 53 | Vialli 58.5 |
| 1996 | Happiness 51.5 | Bruce Compton | Noel Eales, Awapuni | Chantilly Lodge Syndicate | 1:34.77 | Avedon 52 | Chase A Fortune 52.5 |
| 1995 | Silver Chalice 49 | Stewart Campbell | Richard Bothwell, Stratford | JE & RJ Bothwell, Mrs JA & WJ Stewart | 1:35.19 | Endless Joy 48.5 | Frenetic 53.5 |
| 1994 | Z'Oro 49 | Jo Walsh | Frank & Shaune Richie, Takanini | TW Archer & JH Zolezzi | 1:33.41 | Mahoenui Lass 52.5 | Merry Maiden 51 |
| 1993 | Calm Harbour 52 | Lance O'Sullivan | Noel Eales, Awapuni | Peter Thorburn | 1:35.39 | Romanee Conti 53.5 | Moire 50.5 |
| 1992 | Just Tommy 52 | Chris Johnson | Michael Pitman, Riccarton | WA Thomas | 1:36.36 | More Money 50.5 | Seamist 54.5 |
| 1991 | Fire Commander 49 | Lance O'Sullivan | Dave & Paul O'Sullivan, Matamata | AA Blackwell, BJ Lindsay & DA Smith | 1:35.22 | Seamist 50.5 | Greenback 48.5 |
| 1990 | Fun On The Run 52 | David Walsh | Noel Eales, Awapuni | A Dennison, Mrs J Lee, Miss M Short & T Taylor | 1:33.94 | Our High Noon 49 | Tricavaboy 50.5 |
| 1989 | Tricavaboy 51 | Kim Clapperton | David Eagar, Stratford | DW & Mrs EJ & RJ Eagar | 1:35.84 | Sirstaci 49.5 | Bonecrusher 58 |
| 1988 | Golden King 51 | Phillip Mercer | Garth Ivil, Awapuni | WG Ivil, BB O’Donnell & IAH Symes | 1:33.79 | Star Pride 49.5 | Infinite Secret 53 |
| 1987 | Jonny Alone 49 | Paul Taylor | BT Jones | Mr and Mrs JT Aspinall | 1:37.88 | Knight Invader 49 | Crimesta 52 |
| 1986 | Pinson 54.5 | Jim Collett | Don Couchman, Hawera | JR Drought, JW Fraser, FA Long & JR Todd | 1:38.45 | Noble Note 54 | Tanalyse |
| 1985 | Atrapar 54.5 | Maurice Campbell | WJ Calder, Levin | WJ Calder | 1:36.46 | Greatness 53 | Kingdom Bay 52.5 |
| 1984 | Shifnal Prince 50.5 | David Peake | Jack Winder, Cambridge | CR O’Grady & CW Reynolds | 1:35.08 | Manchu 49.5 | Camille 50.5 |
| 1983 | McGinty 51.5 | Jim Cassidy | Colin Jillings, Takanini | Keith Haub & B J McCahill | 1:32.99 | Ringtrue 53 | Jon 54 |
| 1982 | Powley 52.5 | JD Pankhurst | Hec Anderton, Wingatui | HA Anderton | 1:34.75 | Hikotere 49 | Summer Haze 55 |
| 1981 | Speculation 54.5 | Maurice Campbell | Maurice Campbell, Awapuni | AW Fogden & J Willis | 1:35.25 | Daybreak 53 | Anderill 56 |
| 1980 | Raywood Lass 51.5 | Paul Belsham | Eddie Rayner, Marton | CJB Norwood & EW Rayner | 1:37.00 | Bra Hest 50 | Arbre Chene 57 |
| 1979 | Polly Porter 52.5 | RB Weaver | P Wright, Winton | Mrs P Wright | 1:34.50 | Heidelberg 50 | Grey Way 60 |
| 1978 | Copper Belt 59 | Jim Walker | Brian Deacon, Hawera | Kevin and Mrs Kathleen Gray | 1:35.00 | Grey Way 59 | Orchidra 50.5 |
| 1977 | Grey Way 56.5 | Bob Skelton | EP Corby, Washdyke | PG South | 1:35.50 | Fraxy 54.5 | Caruba 51 |
| 1976 | Tiptoe 51 | Chris McNab | Eric Ropiha, Woodville | AS Fell | 1:36.50 | Gold Ducat 51 | No Show 50 |
| 1975 | King's Romance 57 | Bill Skelton | Malcolm Smith, New Plymouth | J McKendrick | 1:33.00 | | |
| 1974 | An Illusion 50.5 | Brent Thomson | Kevin Thomson, Wanganui | JP Norman | 1:35.50 | Kaukapakapa 50.5 | Sir Gallivant 51 |
| 1973 | Kaukapakapa | Bob Skelton | George Cameron, Takanini | GD Cameron | 1:35.00 | | |
| 1972 | Egmont Park | Noel Harris | Brian Deacon, Hawera | IF McGuire | 1:39.00 | Dark Knowledge | Nausori |
| 1971 | Panzer Chief | GN McLiesh | John Revell, Te Aroha | PD Moran | 1:35.00 | | |
| 1970 | Honey Belle | David Peake | George Cameron, Takinani | J Sarten | 1:34.00 | | |
| 1969 | Carlsberg | Herb Ruahihi | Bill Aitken, Bulls | WL Aitken & WW Tatham | 1:34.50 | | |
| 1968 | Bywon | David Peake | George Cameron, Takanini | GP Broun | 1:35.50 | | |
| 1968 | Nausori | Brian Andrews | Bill Hillis, Takanini | Mrs UE Matthews & EB Reid | 1:35.50 | | |
| 1967 | Tara's Pride | John Grylls | Archie Tudor, Stratford | CW Ansford | 1:34.25 | | |
| 1966 | Chantal | Gary Willetts | Jack Hayes, Te Awamutu | Miss LE Jamieson | 1:36.00 | | |
| 1965 | Empyreus | Ron Taylor | Bob Quinlivan, Hastings | HN Phelan | 1:36.25 | | |
| 1964 | Gymkhana | Ron Taylor | B J Nicol | ED Martin | 1:36.25 | | |
| 1963 | Rapido | Jack Mudford | Bruce Priscott, Te Awamutu | WB Priscott | 1:35.50 | | |
| 1962 | Starborough | GP Hulme | Noel Eales, Awapuni | H Cleland | 1:36.50 | | |

== See also ==
- Recent winners of major Wellington and other New Zealand races
- Desert Gold Stakes (raced on same day)
- Telegraph Handicap
- Captain Cook Stakes
- Aotearoa Classic
