= New Zealand St. Leger =

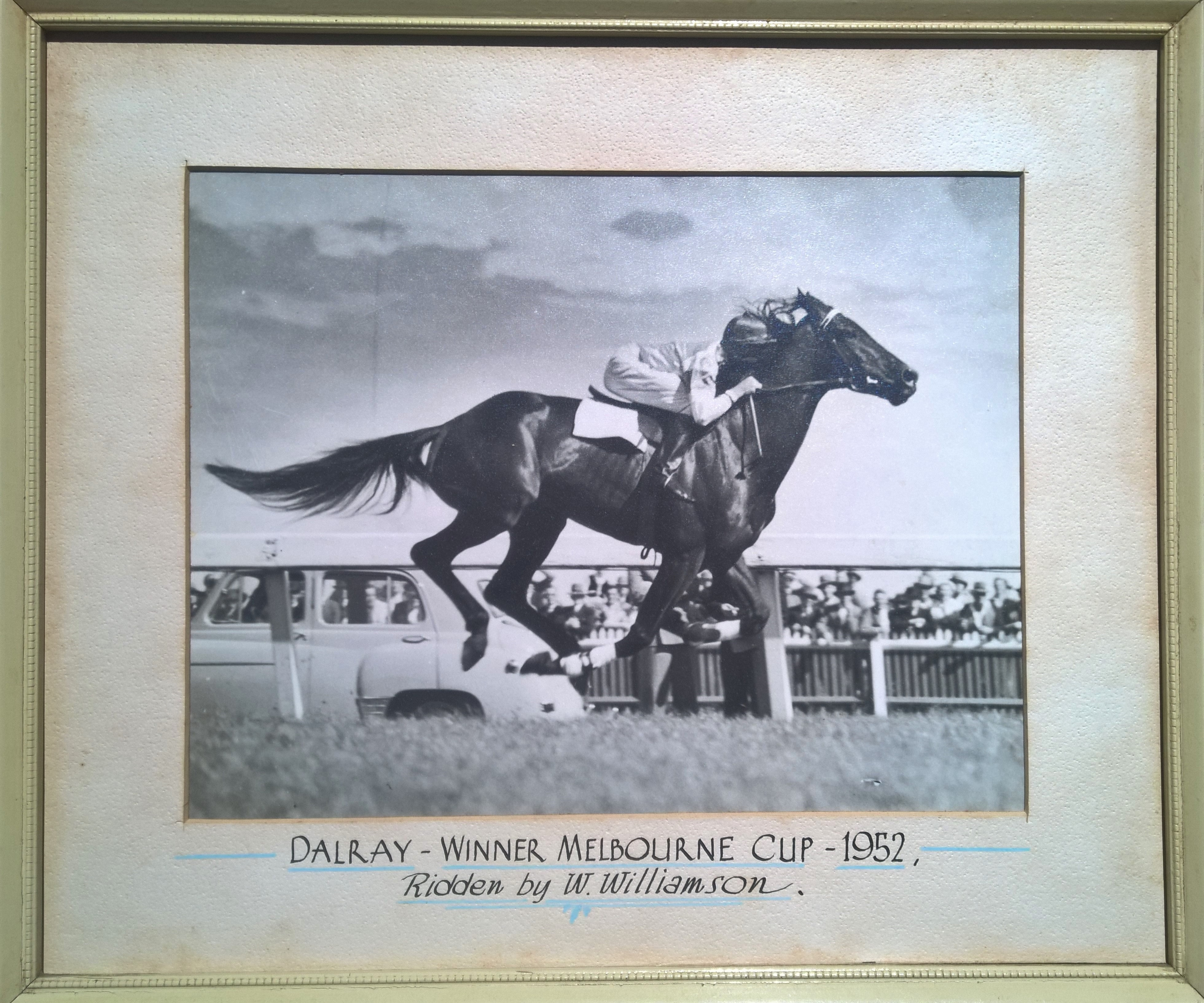
- Dalray, 1952 winner
- Class: Listed
- Location: Trentham Racecourse; Wellington, New Zealand
- Race type: Thoroughbred - Flat racing
- Website: www.trentham.co.nz

Race information
- Distance: 2600 m (13 furlongs)
- Surface: Turf
- Track: Left-handed
- Qualification: Open
- Weight: Set weights and penalties

The New Zealand St. Leger is a major thoroughbred horse race run at Trentham Racecourse in New Zealand on New Zealand Oaks day in March each year.

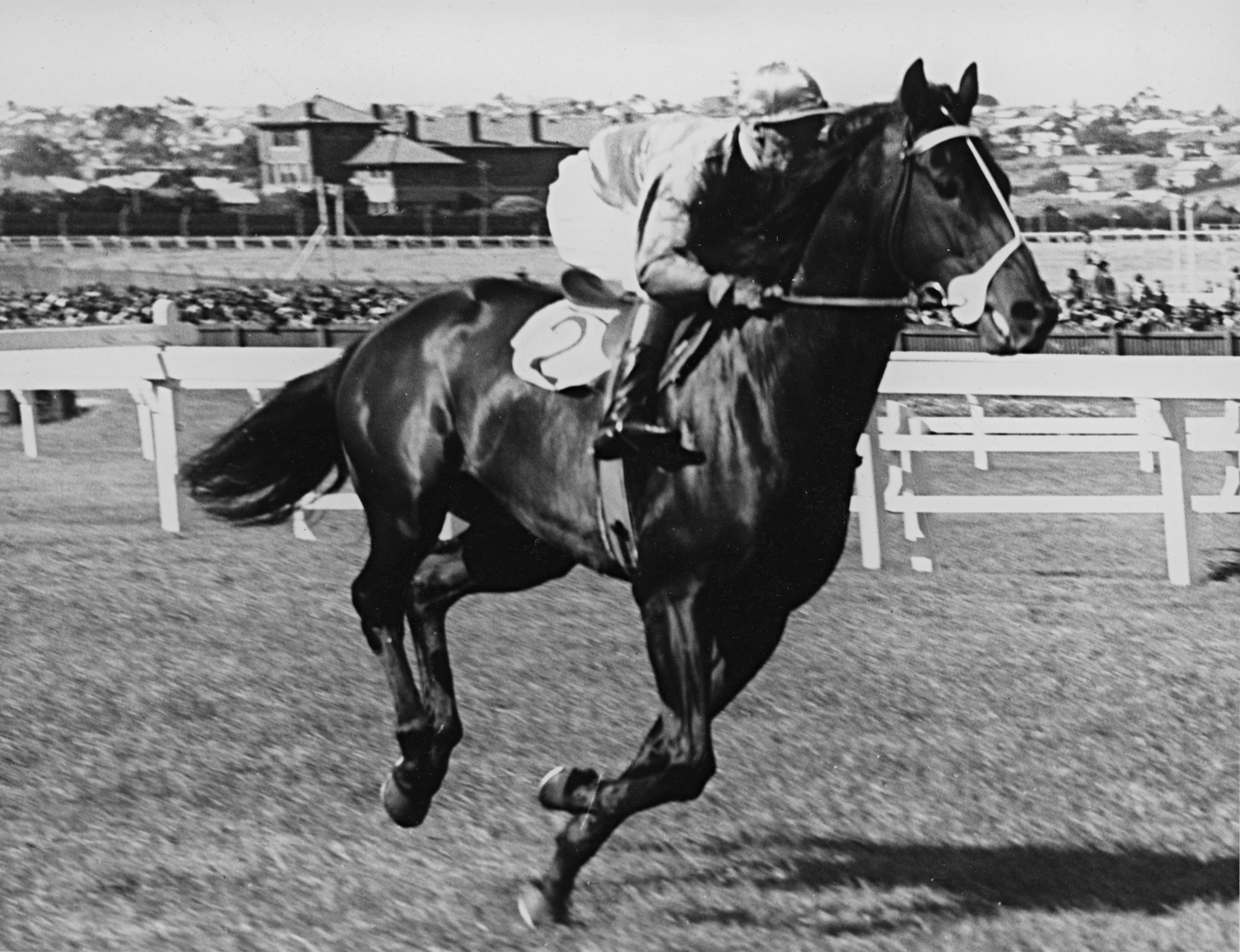
Beau Vite, 1940 winner.

== Race conditions and scheduling ==
Originally a race for three-year-old horses, it was later opened up to both three- and four-year olds and then from 2019 the race became an Open race with set weights and penalties.

The New Zealand St. Leger is a test of a horse's staying ability and has been run over:

- 2500m up until 2018
- 2600m from 2019 to 2024
- 2500m from 2025.

Until 2025 it was raced on New Zealand Oaks day along with:

- Cuddle Stakes (Group 3, 1600m for fillies and mares).
- Lightning Handicap (Listed, 1200m open handicap).
- Wellington Guineas (Group 2, 1400m for 3 year olds)

In 2026 the New Zealand Oaks was moved to Ellerslie Racecourse.

== Notable winners ==
Among the past winners are some of the greatest New Zealand racehorses:

- Beau Vite (the winner in 1940) who won 31 races in New Zealand and Australia including both the 1940 and 1941 editions of the Cox Plate and Mackinnon Stakes and the 1940 Auckland Cup.
- Dalray (1952) who, in a career cut short by injury, won the 1951 New Zealand Derby and in 1952 the Great Northern Derby, Metropolitan Handicap, Mackinnon Stakes and Melbourne Cup.
- Kindergarten (1941) who won 25 of his 35 starts and was one of five inaugural inductees to the New Zealand Racing Hall of Fame.
- Mainbrace (1951) who won 23 of his 25 starts and was inducted into the New Zealand Racing Hall of Fame.
- Silver Knight (1971) who went on to win the Melbourne Cup in the same year.

Although in recent years the New Zealand St. Leger has diminished in status it has continued to attract high class stayers, such as:

- Hail (2002): winner of the 2000 New Zealand Derby, 2002 Sandown Classic and 2003 Zabeel Classic.
- Jacksstar (2016): winner of the 2019 Awapuni Gold Cup and 2016 Manawatu Cup.
- Rock On (2017): winner of the 2018 Manawatu Cup.
- Sampson (2019): winner of the 2017 Awapuni Gold Cup.
- Waisake (2021): winner of the 2021 Wellington Cup
- Leaderboard (2022): winner of the 2023 Wellington Cup

== Race results ==
Year	Winner	Jockey	Trainer(s)	Time
2026	Latest Model 52	Elen Nicholas (a)	Gary Vile	2:38.68 (2500m, soft)
2025	Wolfgang 56	Joe Doyle	Peter & Shaun McKay	2:37.69 (2500m, soft)
2024	Testify Me 55	Chris Dell	Janelle Millar	2:43.78 (2600m, soft)
2023	Ess Vee Are 55	Sam Weatherley	Darryn & Briar Weatherley	2:42.60 (2600m, soft)
2022	Leaderboard	Michael McNab	Jamie Richards	2:39.60 (2600m, dead)
2021	Waisake 56	Hazel Schofer (a)	Allan Sharrock	2:43.87 (2600m, good)
2020	Sergeant Blast 55	Lisa Allpress	Sam Lennox	2:44.97 (2600m, good)
2019	Sampson 55.5	Johnathan Parkes	Howie Mathews	2:44.15 (2600m, soft)
2018	Daytona Red 59.5	Matthew Cameron	Shaun Ritchie	2:36.55 (2500m, good)
2017	Rock On	Jonathan Riddell	Gary Vile	2:37.60
2016	Jacksstar	Cameron Lammas	Gary Vile	2:38.09
2015	Iffwedance	Jonathan Riddell	Trina Riddell	2:38.01
2014	Sir Gus	Chris Johnson	Kevin Gray	2:36.35
2013	Serpent	Vinnie Colgan	Murray Baker/Andrew Forsman	2:39.08
2012	Guns At Five	Damian Browne	Chris Wood	2:37.54
2011	Vikja King	Buddy Lammas	Gary Freeman	2:34.98
2010	Mr Charlie	Leith Innes	Stephen McKee	2:34.50
2009	Valhalla	Lisa Allpress	Evan & J J Rayner	2:36.34
2008	Katy Keen	Opie Bosson	Stuart Manning	2:35.20
2007	Ritzy Lady	Stathi Katsidis	Roger James	2:40.09 (2500m, good)
2006	Ring Of Fire	Leith Innes	Donna & Dean Logan	2:33.65 (2500m, good)
2005	Aeroforce One	Andrew Calder	Roger James	2:38.50
2004	Arreviderci	Hayden Tinsley	Jeff Lynds	2:39.68
2003	Sunray	Noel Harris	Paul O'Sullivan	2:33.65
2002	Hail	Noel Harris	Bruce & Stephen Marsh	2:36.54
2001	Forfar	Noel Harris	Paul O'Sullivan	2:34.02
2000	Big Hustler	Michael Walker	Ray Peake, Pukekohe	2:35.55
1999	Narousa	David Walsh	B & S Anderton	2:35.05
1998	Beechwood Road	Hayden Tinsley	W Scott	2:35.08
1997	Interval	Lee Tiley	Stephen & Trevor McKee, Takanini	2:40.08
1996	Lady Dahar	Tony Allan	PW Lock	2:35.45
1995	Freequent	Phillip Mercer	RR Hayward	2:32.41
1994	Sir Ailahtan	Damon Smith	JS Lobb	2:34.54
1993	Barbut Delcia	PG Tims	KS Cullen	2:36.99
1992	no race			
1991	Halfmarks	Lance O'Sullivan	Dave & Paul O'Sullivan	2:38.60
1990	Enthuse	Lance O'Sullivan	Dave & Paul O'Sullivan	2:03.36
1989	Saveur	Tony Allan		2:38.72
1988	Mr Bunnythorpe	Barry Griffin	ME Griffin, Awapuni	2:37.13
1987 (2500m)	Dungarven	Lance O'Sullivan	Jim Gibbs & Roger James	2:36.54
1986	Regimental March	Nigel Tiley	Frank Ritchie	3:00.93
1985	Sir Vigilant	Noel Harris	Murray Baker, Woodville	3:03.62
1984	Imaprince	Greg Childs	BAV Preston	2:59.01
1983	Secured Deposit	TG Williams	Neville Atkins, Waiuku	2:55.40
1982	Velvet Dream	Maurice Campbell	CJ Bradley	2:54.50
1981	Benny	Brian Hibberd	CJ Cameron, Hastings	3:05
1980	Judena	Maurice Campbell	Peter Hollinshead, Te Awamutu	3:03.50
1979	Tui's Lass	Russell McAra	JS McKay	3:03.25
1978	Disraeli	Gary Phillips	TL Jennings	2:59.5
1977	Lumley Lass	D Metcalfe	WC Winder, Te Rapa	2:54
1976	Happy Union	Bob Skelton	WC Winder, Te Rapa	2:57
1975	Kenann	Noel Harris	CR Cooksley, Takanini	2:58.5
1974 (2800m)	Guest Star	Bob Skelton	IJ & IR Tucker, Takanini	3:09.5
1973	Cradenly	Alwin Tweedie		3:04
1972	Llananthony	GR Edge	JW Winder, Te Rapa	3:09
1971	Silver Knight	Bruce Marsh	Eric Temperton, Awapuni	2:54
1970	Not Again	Grenville Hughes		2:55.5
1969	Shantung	Grenville Hughes	WC Winder, Te Rapa	2:59
1968	Whiti Te Ra	JF Harris	PM Keegan	2:58.25
1967	Jay Ay	RA Jenkins		2:58.25
1966	Terrific	Grenville Hughes	M & F Ritchie, Ellerslie	2:55.5
1965	Empyreus	RW Taylor	KH Qunlivan, Hastings	3:17.25
1964	Clayton King	PK Cathro		
1963	Zinder	Bob Skelton		
1962	Cracksman	LG Coles		
1961	Bargoed	Grenville Hughes		
1960	Howsie	J Walker		
1959	Lawful	WA Smith		
1958	Rover	JW Harris		
1957	Passive	WJ Mudford		
1956	Syntax	Norm Holland		
1955	Hot Drop	CH Mackie		
1954	Surprise Ending	DJ Thistoll		
1953	Gold Scheme	Bill Broughton		
1952	Dalray	K Nuttall		
1951	Mainbrace	Grenville Hughes		
1950	Tudor Prince	Bill Broughton		
1949	Tauloch	WR Hooten		
1948	Foxbay	J Williamson		
1947	Desert Fox	A Midwood		
1946	Western Front	WF Ellis		
1945	no race			
1944	no race			
1943	no race			
1942	Palfrey	A Messervy		
1941	Kindergarten	HN Wiggins		
1940	Beau Vite	AE Ellis		
1939	Beaupatir	AE Ellis		
1938	Royal Chief	LJ Ellis		
1937	Wild Chase	G Humphries		
1936	Entail	G Humphries		
1935	Sproting Blood	A Tinker		
1934	Spiral	LG Morris		
1933	La Moderne	R Reed		
1932	Peter Jackson	T Green		
1931	Lady Pam	RW McTavish		
1930	Vali	RS Bagby		
1929	Concentrate	BH Morris		
1928	Satrap	T Green		
1927	Commendation	LG Morris		
1926	Star Stranger	R Reed		
1925	Quiescent	R Reed		
1924	Ballymena	M McCarten		
1923	Rapine	R Reed		
1922	Kick Off	RS Bagby		
1921	Duo	H Goldfinch		
1920	Amythas	J Campbell		
1919	Afterglow	B Deeley		
1918	no race			
1917	Kilboy	B Deeley		
1916	Eligible	A Oliver		
1915	Balboa	B Deeley		
1914	Merry Roe	J Buchanen		
1913	Bon Ton	A Oliver		
1912	Counterfeit	FE Jones		
1911	Danube	Hector Gray		
1910	Ingoda	R Hatch		
1909	Master	RE Brown		
1908	Signor	R Cameron		
1907	Volume	C Jenkins		
1906	Isolt	LH Hewitt		
1905	Nightfall	FD Jones		
1904	Treadmill	LH Hewitt		
1903	Kelburn	H Donovan		
1902	Cruciform	LH Hewitt		
1901	Beddington	J Gallagher		
1900	Miss Delaval	T Taylor		
1899	Altair	R Derrett		

== See also ==
- Thoroughbred racing in New Zealand
