= Desert Gold Stakes =

Horse race in New Zealand

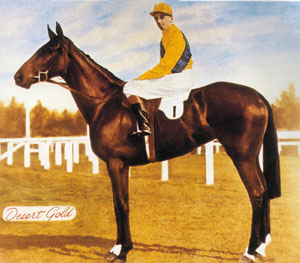
Desert Gold

The Desert Gold Stakes is a horse race held by the Wellington Racing Club at Trentham Racecourse named in honor of the great filly, Desert Gold. The horses taking part are 3 year-old fillies which race over 1600 metres.

== History ==
The Desert Gold Stakes was first held in 1947 when there was two Desert Gold Stakes, the first in January won by Indian Dawn and then another in October won by Regal Gem.

The race was previously held in March (2003-2005) and late October (up to 2001) but is now held during the Wellington Cup carnival in January. The Desert Gold Stakes was raced over a 1500m journey from 2000 to 2005. The 1998 event was raced over 1600m at Hastings. It is currently a Group 3 event but in the 1980s it held Group 2 status.

Notable winners include La Crique, La Mer and Princess Coup. Those who could only manage a placing include: Bonneval, Katie Lee and Tycoon Lil.

Savabeel has sired four winners between 2016 and 2023. Champion jockey Grenville Hughes rode four winners between 1953 and 1975.

== Race results ==
The following are the winners and place-getters of the Desert Gold Stakes since 1947.

Year	Winner	Jockey	Trainer(s)	Owner(s)	Sire	Dam	Time	Second	Third
2026	Fairy Dream 56.5	Masa Hashizume	Roger James & Robert Wellwood	C R Litt & H J Litt	Proisir	Fairygem	1:39.84 (soft)	Waimea Bay 56.5	Crimson Sky 56.5
2025	Leica Lucy 56.5	Craig Grylls	Robbie Patterson	Peter J & Heather J Crofskey	Derryn (Aus)	Dynamite Lucy	1:35.19 (good)	Connello 56.5	Renovations 56.5
2024	Sudbina 56.5	Kozzi Asano	Roger James & Robert Wellwood	Frantic Bloodstock Ltd & Haunui Bloodstock Ltd	Almanzor	Destined	1:36.75 (soft)	Grail Seeker 56.5	The Entertainer 56.5
2023	Mazzolino 56.5	Sam Weatherley	Stephen Marsh	Waikato Stud Ltd	Savabeel	Posy	1:39.92 (heavy)	Pennyweka 56.5	Beyond Violet 56.5
2022	La Crique 56.5	Craig Grylls	Simon & Katrina Alexander	Mrs J K & J T Cassin	Vadamos	Destiny Cove	1:35.88. (Dead)	Sassy Merlot 56.5	Love Letter 56.5
2021	Force Of Will 56.5	Craig Grylls	Lance O'Sullivan & Andrew Scott	Go Bloodstock Australia Pty Ltd	Power (GB)	Sade	1:37.84	Victorem 56.5	Passione 56.5
2020	Showbeel 56.5	Opie Bosson	Murray Baker & Andrew Forsman, Cambridge	WG Candy & WH Luff	Savabeel	Showileo (Aust)	1:36.91	Loire 56.5	Jennifer Eccles 56.5
2019	Secret Allure 56.5	Leith Innes	Lisa Latta	AJ Rennie, TD Tomlins, P Finlayson, KTJ Dixon, M Passey, DA Masters, LM Latta	Zacinto (GB)	Secret Scene	1:37.12	Jakkalbomb 56.5	Valalie (AUS) 56.5
2018	Dijon Bleu 56.5	Leith Innes	Lisa Latta	KTJ Dixon, P Finlayson, LM Latta, DA Masters, MG Passey, AJ Rennie, TD Tomlins	Burgundy	Pristino	1:37.88	Blanco Belle 56.5	Milseain 56.5
2017	Nicoletta 56.5	Michael Coleman	Murray Baker & Andrew Forsman	JML Bloodstock Ltd (L Petagna, manager)	Savabeel	Celtic Crown (USA)	1:37.46	Devise 56.5	Bonneval 56.5
2016	Duchess Kate 56.5	Matt Cameron	Stephen Autridge & Jamie Richards	Whitby Bloodstock Trust	Savabeel	Royal Prize	1:36.92	Bella Court 56.5	Strada Cavallo 56.5
2015	Platinum Witness	Darryl Bradley	Lisa Latta	Lincoln Farms Ltd & N J McAlister	California Dane (AUS)	Chartreuse	1:36.04	Attention Seeker	Exquisite Jewel
2014	Moozoon	Mark Sweeney	Stephen McKee, Ardmore	Sheikh Mohammed bin Khalifa Al Maktoum	Perfectly Ready (AUS)	Mizzna	1:35.76	Miss Selby	Costa Viva (AUS)
2013	High Fashion	Hayden Tinsley	Kevin Gray	H M & Mrs P M Forbes	O'Reilly	Pin High	1:36.34	Soriano	Lucky Country
2012	Quintessential	Lisa Allpress	John Sargent	Nearco Stud Ltd (Mgr A E Clark)	Fast ‘N’ Famous	Florette (USA)	1:37.62	Capital Diamond	Artistic
2011	Dating	James McDonald	Graeme & Debbie Rogerson	Waikato Stud 2001 Ltd	O'Reilly	Mandate	1:37.34	Angel Del Dinero	L’Armour
2010	Keep The Peace	Jason Waddell	Shaune Ritchie	P E Bellingham, L R & L R D Dittman	Keeper (AUS)	Peace of Mind	1:37.73	Marsh Harbour	Katie Lee
2009	Glamorous Girl	Andrew Calder	Roger James & Paul Mirabeli	Kingsclere Filly Syndicate 2007	Thorn Park (AUS)	J’Lo	1:36.85	Puttanesca	Awesome Planet (Aus)
2008	Keepa Cruisin 56	Leith Innes	Stephen McKee, Ardmore	Karreman Bloodstock Ltd	Keeper (AUS)	Just Cruising (Aus), by Broad Beach	1:35.8	Kaatoon 56	Bella Valentina 56
2007	Princess Coup 56	Opie Bosson	Mark Walker	Bromley Bloodstock Ltd & R A Coupland	Encosta De Lago (AUS)	Stoneyfell Road (AUS)	1:37.99	Veloce Bella 56	Shira 56
2006 Jan	Out of Align 56	Scott Seamer	Gary Vile	CD Allison, CV & JA Barnao, DV & Mrs HR Gilliard & TP Heptinstall	Align (AUS)	Limerick Lea	1:36.48	Legs 56	Pulcinella 56
2005 March	Senorita Dane 56	Jamie Bullard	Paul Harris, Rangiora	Bend The Arm Syndicate No 3 & The Ratpack Syndicate	Senor Pete (USA)	Snadame	1:31.14 (1500m)	Sista 56	Ladykin 56
2004 March	Pride Of The Class	Mark Barnsley	Michael Moroney & Andrew Scott	Class of 2002 Syndicate	Volksraad (GB)	Grosvenor's Pride	1:31.89 (1500m)	Rapid Kay	Vision
2003 March	Lonestar Lady 56	Hayden Tinsley	S Mitchell	MA & Mrs PH Brenton-Rule	Deputy Governor (USA)	My Good Omen (AUS)	1:29.0 (1500m)	Luscious Lady 56	Fontaine 56
2002	not raced								
2001	Blackrock College 56	Hayden Tinsley	John Wheeler	JG & Mrs TA Donovan, JR & Mrs LJ Wheeler	Volksraad (GB)	Marscade	1:35.71 (1500m)	Elfonze 56	Kapiston (AUS) 56
2000	Singalong 56	Noel Harris	Stephen Autridge	Miss WL & Lady Hogan & Mrs NK Hunt	Danasinga (AUS)	Echostatic	1:30.63 (1500m)	La Bella Dama 56	Mine D’Or 56
1999	Thee Old Dragon 56	Tony Allan	Alan Jones & Brett McDonald, Cambridge	Thee Old Dragon Syndicate	Desert Sun (GB)	Lady Kintyre	1:36.34	Party Queen 56	Jetline 56
1998	Pace Invader 56	David Walsh	A Clark	PR Dickinson, AR & EJ Johnson & CT Wintle	Westminster	Grey Invader	1:36.09	Mi Babe 56	Luvtonoah 56
1997	Alavana 55	Gary Grylls	G K Sanders, Te Awamutu	CL and Mrs RL McKay	Christmas Tree	Morgaine	1:39.74	Tycoon Lil (AUS) 55	Rivatar 55
1996	Tartan Belle 55	Vincent Colgan	Roger James & Lance Noble	Mrs BN, Messrs D & ID & Mrs V Campbell	Kreisler	Argyll Dazzler	1:37.77	Gold Cloud 55	Sawatdee 55
1995	Clear Rose 55.5	Noel Harris	Laurie Laxon	Laurie Laxon, CL Leong, PJ & PM Vela	Deputy Governor	Thosada Rose	1:39.21	Miss Tree 56	Sojourner 56
1994	Moonshine 55.5	Shane Udy	Stephen & Trevor McKee, Takanini	W Heathcote & Trevor McKee	Sound Reason	Sister Moonshine	1:37.16	Helen’s Pride 55.5	Tidal Rhythm 55.5
1993 October	Facing The Music 55.5	DP Smith	M B Ingram	M B Ingram	Sackford	Composing	1:39.35	Silver Chalice 55.5	Real Success 55.5
1992	Larrikan Lady 55.5	Lisa D McGregor	A L Good	K Betty, KV Robinson, EJ Pratt & G Rotherham	Icelandic	Zoomer	1:58.19 (heavy)	Star Of Tudor 55.5	Slanchyvah 55.5
1991	Staring 55.5	Larry Cassidy	Murray Baker	MM Andersen & MJ Gyde	Fiesta Star	Sweet Violet	1:42.99	Normandy River 55.5	Colours 55.5
1990 October	Morning Rise 55.5	Grant Cooksley	Colin Jillings & Richard Yull	Karaka Verandah Racing Ltd & Co	Straight Strike	Rivermist	1:44.11	Auburn Blaze 55.5	Cupri Rosa 55.5
1989	Madame Bardot 55.5	Larry Cassidy	D N Couchman & P S Belsham	DG & GD & Mrs P Smart	Little Brown Jug	Bashful Row	1:47.22	Princess Rojuan 56	Our Hawk 56
1988	Olga's Pal 55.5	Brian Hibberd	Bob & Toby Autridge	HJ Fleming	Straight Strike	Tinawin	1:39.42	Imperialaire 55.5	Kate’s Myth (AUS) 55.5
1987 October	Impasada 55.5	Brian Hibberd	Dave and Paul O'Sullivan	Eric Hopson	Imperial Seal	Charsada	1:38.74	Serestrina 55.5	Candide 55.5
1986 October	Tri Belle 55.5	MR Campbell	Ray Verner	Estate of J Sarten	Sir Tristram	Stellar Belle	1:41.83	Never Winter 55.5	Radiate 55.5
1985	Josette Nicole 55.5	G Elliott	E W Rayner	Mr & Mrs KIA Taylor	Three Legs	Diatrelic	1:42.93	Seadreamer 55.5	Classic Ace 55.5
1984	Avana 55.5	Noel Harris	R T Cleaver, Cambridge	PJ Holman & AG Kostanich	Avaray	Lyn Hanan	1:38.14	Jayell's Pride 55.5	Princess Dram 55.5
1983	Eastern Bay 55.5	David Walsh	W J Bromby, Cambridge	HL Briggs, J McCartie & Mrs K Whitely	Princely Note	Ashling	1:45.57 Heavy	Otola Belle 55.5	Walksfar 55.5
1982	Our Flight	M R Campbell	E B Skelton	J W Rusher	Imperial Guard	Jane Flight	1:40.25 soft	Passakiss 55.5	Beaufort Lass 55.5
1981	Swell Deal 55.5	M R Campbell	L R Douglas & A L Jones	A L Jones	Crest Of The Wave	Dollar A Deal	1:46.5 heavy	Julia 55.5	Blarney Lass 55.5
1980	Polar Air	Peter Johnson	R J Curlett	Mr R J & Mrs Curlett	Frontal (USA)	Amerijet	1:39.0	Summer Haze 55.5	Full Of Grace 55.5
1979	Gay Sharon 55.5	Des Harris	R B Dowling & R J Walsh	J L Chiongbian & V B Johnson	Taipan II (USA)	Gay Sovereign	1:39.75	Judena 55.5	Pays Anne 55.5
1978	Springtide 55.5	Robert Vance	Colin Jillings, Takanini	E L Gaylord & H Noble	Karayar	Eskimo Princess	1:42.5 Soft	Tang 55.5	Musical Lady 55.5
1977	Tudor Quest 55.5	J W Walker	D Grubb, Feilding	JR Gilbert, NC Salisbury, Dr J Hall & Dr WJ Treadwell	Pass The Bottle	Star Quest	1:39 Firm	Mun Lee 55.5	Braless 55.5
1976	La Mer	Des Harris	Malcolm Smith, New Plymouth	Est L A Alexander	Copenhagen II	Royal Charger, by Worden	1:39.75	Regal Band	Rina
1975	Mop	Grenville Hughes		T C Lowry	Taipan II (US)	Rag Doll (NZ)	1:39		
1974	Persuasion	Brent Thomson		N B Hunt	My Heart		1:47		
1973	Prepak	David Peake		N HW Amon	Pakistan II	Precarious (NZ)	1:38.5		
1972	Peg's Pride	Des Harris		P J Burrows	Alcimedes (GB)	Winnipeg II (NZ)	1:38.75		
1971	Young Ida	HN Rauhihi		J H T Duncan	Oncidium (GB)	Young Margaret II (Ire)	1:45.75		
1970	Brookby Hill	KS Cullen		R G Chitty			1:44		
1969	Ruelle	Grenville Hughes		Mrs C C E Thompson	Summertime (GB)	Ruve (NZ)	1:36.75		
1968	Brazil	BS Dodds		J D & L D Georgetti	Better Honey (GB)	Moonee Valley (NZ)	1:41.25		
1967	High Delight	Bill Skelton		A E & Mrs Preston			1:38		
1966	Star Belle	Bob Skelton		J Sarten			1:43.25		
1965	Fairfleet	R Fisher		A G & Mrs Tinkham			1:40		
1964	Trial Offer	KS Cullen		C W Berry & B Hayter			1:46.25		
1963	Cicada	Grenville Hughes		L S Otway			1:38.25		
1962	Blyton	JF Grylls		Sir James & J C Fletcher			1:43.5		
1961	Key	KS Cullen		T C Lowry			1:37.75		
1960	Challen	Des J Wyatt		J B Mitchell			1:39.5		
1959	Sigh	Bob Skelton		J G Alexander			1:43		
1958	Jaina	J T Anderson		H C Adams & P G Henwood			1:42.25		
1957	Saecelle	N E Eastwood		Mrs F A Roberts			1:39		
1956	Passive	Bill Broughton		J A Mitchell			1:38.5		
1955	Gentle Lu	J W Harris		L W Davis			1:44.75		
1954	Glenlee	C A Bowry		Mrs D Macpherson			1:39.5		
1953	Sweet Wren	Grenville Hughes		T M Roberts			1:38.75		
1952	Hello Pam	Norm Holland		J A Betts			1:40.25		
1951	Princess Loch	Vic Sellars		K W Honeyfield			1:42.25		
1950	Zenith	W R Hooten		F Smith			1:39		
1949	Dixie	J A McFarlane		Mrs D H Blackie			1:48		
1948	Flying Sovereign	C T Wilson		Mrs G Murray-Aynsley			1:41.25		
1947 (October)	Regal Gem	J A McFarlane		J A Higgs			1:48.5		
1947 (January)	Indian Dawn	J A McFarlane		Mrs N H Barlow			1:38.5		

== See also ==
- Thorndon Mile (raced on the same day)
- Trentham Stakes
- New Zealand Oaks
- New Zealand 1000 Guineas
- New Zealand 2000 Guineas
- New Zealand Derby
- Thoroughbred racing in New Zealand
