= Norm Holland =

New Zealand jockey

Norm Holland OBE
Personal information
- Born: 24 March 1924 Barrow-in-Furness, Lancashire, England
- Died: 30 November 2014 (aged 90) Auckland, New Zealand
- Occupation: Jockey

Horse racing career
- Sport: Horse racing
- Career wins: over 900

Honours
- Officer of the Order of the British Empire

Significant horses
- Syntax, Gene, Indian Mars

Norman Bannerman Holland OBE (24 March 1924 – 30 November 2014) was a New Zealand jockey.

Born in Barrow-in-Furness, England, in 1924, Holland emigrated to New Zealand on the Ruahine with his father and brother in 1929, and settled in Taranaki.

After leaving school at the age of 13, Holland was an apprentice jockey with Oney Cox at Hāwera, and rode his first race in 1940. He went on to win the New Zealand jockeys' premiership three times:

- 1945–46
- 1947–48
- 1951–52.

He finished second on a further three occasions including 1946-47 and 1949–50 behind Bill Broughton and 1955–56 behind Bob Skelton.

His victories included:

- 1943 Telegraph Handicap on Palora
- 1952 Desert Gold Stakes on Hello Pam
- 1954 Railway Stakes on Nushka
- 14 wins from 16 starts on Syntax, including the 1955 New Zealand Derby, 1956 Great Northern Derby, New Zealand St. Leger and Awapuni Gold Cup
- 1962 New Zealand Derby on Algalon
- 1962 Canterbury Gold Cup on Stipulate
- 1967 Railway Stakes on Gene

He retired from riding in 1974, having ridden over 900 winners.

He continued his involvement with racing, spending 17 years as riding master at the Auckland Apprentice School, and serving as the jockeys' liaison officer for the Auckland Racing Club.

In the 1977 New Year Honours, Holland was appointed an Officer of the Order of the British Empire, for services to horseracing. He was made a life member of the Auckland Racing Club in 2005, and at the 2010 New Zealand Thoroughbred Racing Awards he received the award for contribution to racing.

Holland died in Auckland in 2014. His funeral was held at Ellerslie Racecourse, and he was buried at Purewa Cemetery.

== See also ==
- Thoroughbred racing in New Zealand
