= Noel Harris =

New Zealand jockey

Noel Harris MNZM
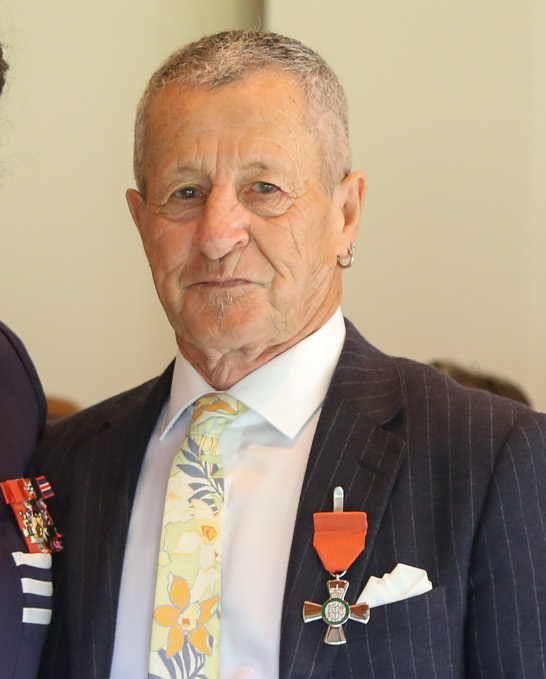
- Harris in 2025

Personal information
- Full name: Noel Graham Harris
- Born: 1955 or 1956 (age 70–71) New Zealand
- Occupation: Jockey
- Spouse: Kylie Harris (wife)

Horse racing career
- Sport: Horse racing

Significant horses
- Castletown; Poetic Prince; Hail; Princess Coup

Noel Graham Harris MNZM (born 1955 or 1956) is a former New Zealand Thoroughbred racing jockey. He rode 2,167 race winners in New Zealand, which is the fourth-highest total, behind Chris Johnson, David Walsh and Lance O'Sullivan. He has won the jockeys' premiership in both New Zealand and Singapore. In 2018, Harris was inducted into the New Zealand Racing Hall of Fame, and in December 2024 he was appointed a Member of the New Zealand Order of Merit

== Riding career ==
Born in 1955 or 1956, Harris was apprenticed at Woodville to his father, John William (Jock) Harris, who was a leading jockey both on the flat and over jumps before becoming a horse trainer. He rode his first winner at Foxton on 16 May 1970, and took out the 1971–1972 apprentice jockeys' premiership as an 18-year-old, before sharing the national jockeys' premiership with David Peake the following year.

During his career, Harris achieved 34 group one wins, including almost all of the major races in New Zealand. He won three Wellington Cups on Castletown, four New Zealand Cups, and three Auckland Cups. With eight 3200-metre cup wins in New Zealand, Harris shares the record with Bob Skelton.

As an 18-year-old, Harris rode the Jock Harris-trained Glengowan to a close second behind Gala Supreme in the 1973 Melbourne Cup. Other placings for Harris in the Melbourne Cup include finishing fourth in the 1984 Cup on Lord Metric and the 1986 Cup with Kiwi, and Castletown's third placing in 1992.

Harris's biography, Harry, The Ride Of My Life, by Wally O'Hearn was released in August 2012.

Harris retired in 2015 and became a national riding mentor for apprentice jockeys. He was inducted into the New Zealand Racing Hall of Fame in 2018. In the 2025 New Year Honours, Harris was appointed a Member of the New Zealand Order of Merit, for services to the Thoroughbred racing industry.

== Family ==
Harris's two oldest siblings, John and Des, were both leading apprentice jockeys, and his three other siblings—Peter, Karen and Jenny—were also jockeys. John, Des and Peter Harris all became horse trainers.

Harris's son, Troy Harris, is also a jockey.

== Notable victories ==
Major races won by Harris include the following.

Year	Race	Horse	Trainer(s)
1972	WRC George Adams Handicap (G1)	Egmont Park	Brian Deacon
1973	Telegraph Handicap (G2)	Sharif	Jock Harris
1973	Wellington Derby (G2)	Peg's Pride	
1973	Feehan Stakes (G2)	Audaciter	Gary Lee
1973	Caulfield Stakes (G1)	Glengowan	Gary Lee
1974	Chirnside Stakes (G2)	Grey Way	Pat Corboy
1976	New Zealand 1000 Guineas (G1)	Porsha	Bill & Graeme Sanders
1976	Governor's Stakes, MVRC (G3)	Shaitan	
1978	Singapore Gold Cup	Saas Fee	Ivan Allen
1978	Perak TC Sultan's Gold Vase, Perak, Malaysia	Star Prince	
1979	Singapore Lion City	Butterfly Boy	
1980	Wellington Derby (G2)	Lovelace Watkins	Graeme Sanders
1980	Avondale Cup (G1)	Shamrock	Bruce Marsh
1981	Ellerslie Sires Produce Stakes (G1)	Loughanure	Bill Sanders
1981	GCTC Prime Minister's Cup (G3)	Shamrock	Bruce Marsh
1982	P J O'Shea Stakes (G2)	Shamrock	Bruce Marsh
1983	Queen Elizabeth Stakes (VRC) (G2)	Fountaincourt	Cyril Pfefferle
1984	New Zealand 2000 Guineas (G1)	Kingdom Bay	Jack Taylor
1985	New Zealand St. Leger (G1)	Sir Vigilant	Murray Baker
1985	BATC Black Douglas Stakes (listed)	Kingdom Bay	Jack Taylor
1985	VRC Oaks (G1)	Tristram's Belle	
1985	Manawatu Cup (G3)	Whitole	D Jones
1987	Ormond Memorial	Secret Seal	Jeff Lynds
1987	Carringbush Cup (G2)	Palliser	
1988	Television New Zealand Stakes (G1)	Horlicks	Dave & Paul O'Sullivan
1988	Cox Plate (G1)	Poetic Prince	John Wheeler
1989	Waikato Sprint (G1)	Poetic Prince	John Wheeler
1989	Tancred Stakes (G1)	Poetic Prince	John Wheeler
1989	Queen Elizabeth Stakes (ATC) (G1)	Poetic Prince	John Wheeler
1990	Bayer Classic (G1)	Eagle Eye	Murray Baker
1990	Sydney Cup (G1)	King Aussie	John Harris
1990	Shannon Quality Handicap (G3)	Go Bush	
1991	Wellington Cup (G1)	Castletown	Patrick Busuttin
1991	Ormond Memorial (G3)	Castletown	Patrick Busuttin
1992	Auckland Cup (G1)	Castletown	Patrick Busuttin
1992	Wellington Cup (G1)	Castletown	Patrick Busuttin
1992	New Zealand Oaks (G1)	Staring	Murray Baker
1992	Caulfield Stakes (G1)	Castletown	Patrick Busuttin
1993	Bluebird Foods Classic (G1)	Staring	Murray Baker
1994	Wellington Cup (G1)	Castletown	Patrick Busuttin
1995	Manawatu Sires Produce Stakes (G1)	Ballroom Babe	Graeme Sanders
1995	VRC St Leger (G3)	Count Chivas	Don Sellwood
1995	South Australian Derby (G1)	Count Chivas	Don Sellwood
1995	New Zealand 1000 Guineas (G1)	Clear Rose	Laurie Laxon
1997	Wanganui Stakes (G2)	Super Crest	John Sargent
1997	Taranaki Stakes (G2)	Super Crest	John Sargent
1997	Captain Cook Stakes (G1)	Super Crest	John Sargent
1999	Thorndon Mile (G1)	Surface	Noel Eales
1999	Waikato Sprint (G1)	Surface	Noel Eales
1999	New Zealand Cup (G2)	Wake Forest	Gus Clutterbuck
1999	Auckland Cup (G1)	Irish Chance	Colin Jillings & Richard Yuill
2000	Telegraph Handicap (G1)	Fritz	Neil Coulbeck
2000	Auto Auctions WFA (G1)	Surface	Noel Eales
2000	New Zealand Derby	Hail	Bruce Marsh
2001	Railway Stakes (G1)	Fritz	Neil Coulbeck
2001	Mudgway Stakes (G2)	Fritz	Neil Coulbeck
2001	Manawatu Sires Produce Stakes (G1)	San Luis	Chris McNab
2002	New Zealand 2000 Guineas (G1)	Hustler	Paul Harris
2002	New Zealand Cup (G2)	Mike	Paul Harris
2003	Auckland Cup (G1)	Bodle	Neil Connors
2004	Telegraph Handicap (G1)	King's Chapel	Mark Walker
2006	New Zealand Cup (G2)	Pentathon	John Wheeler
2006	Avondale Cup (G1)	Sharvasti	John Sargent
2007	Kelt Capital Stakes (G1)	Princess Coup	Mark Walker
2007	New Zealand Cup (G2)	Everswindell	John Sargent
2008	Manawatu Sires Produce Stakes (G1)	Il Quello Veloce	John Sargent
2008	Mudgway Stakes (G1)	Fritzy Boy	Alby MacGregor
2010	Telegraph Handicap (G1)	Vonusti	Tim & Margaret Carter
2014	Awapuni Gold Cup (G2)	Soriano	Graeme & Debbie Rogerson

== See also ==
- Lisa Allpress
- Opie Bosson
- Chris Johnson
- Lance O'Sullivan
- Michael Walker
- David Walsh
- Thoroughbred racing in New Zealand
