= Race of the Century =

The Race of the Century is the name of four famous races:

- Race of the Century (auto racing), the 1953 French Grand Prix between Mike Hawthorn and Juan Manuel Fangio
- Race of the Century (athletics), the 1954 British Empire Games, mile race between Roger Bannister and John Landy
- Race of the Century (horse racing), the 1986 Cox Plate race involving Waverley Star and Bonecrusher
- Race of the Century (swimming), the 2004 Athens Olympic Games Men's 200m Freestyle Final, involving Ian Thorpe, Pieter van den Hoogenband, Grant Hackett and Michael Phelps

and a film:

- Race of the Century (film), a 1986 film which gives a dramatic presentation of the events of the Sunday Times Golden Globe Race
