= Mainbrace =

New Zealand-bred Thoroughbred racehorse

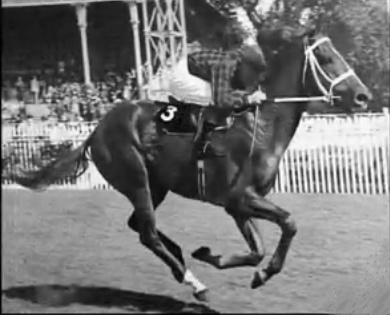
- Sire: Admiral's Luck (GB)
- Grandsire: Precipitation
- Dam: Maneroo (5)
- Damsire: Siegfried (GB)
- Sex: Stallion
- Foaled: 1947
- Country: New Zealand
- Colour: Chestnut
- Breeder: Tom C Fraser and Bob Nolan
- Owner: Dr Tom C Fraser and Bob Nolan
- Trainer: Jack McDonald
- Record: 25: 23-2-0
- Earnings: £28,985

Major wins
- Great Northern Guineas (1950); Great Northern Derby (1951); North Island Challenge Stakes (1951); New Zealand St. Leger (1951); Awapuni Gold Cup (1951)

Honours
- New Zealand Racing Hall of Fame
- Last updated on 17 November 2010

Mainbrace was a champion New Zealand Thoroughbred racehorse who won 23 of his 25 race starts and was placed second in the other two. Notably the two losses were to the same horse, The Unicorn, who he beat on other occasions.

When he broke down he had won 17 races in succession, which was only two behind Gloaming and Desert Gold's Australasian record. It was only a defeat in his first start as a 3-year old that prevented a winning streak of 24. On eight occasions he either equalled or broke the race record. He is regarded as one of the greatest horses to have raced in New Zealand.

Included among his Principal (or stakes) wins are the Awapuni Gold Cup, Champagne Stakes, Great Northern Derby, New Zealand St. Leger, Great Northern Foal Stakes, Royal Stakes, Great Northern Guineas, Wellington Guineas, Foxbridge Plate, King's Plate, North Island Challenge Stakes, Taranaki Stakes, Wellington Stakes, Gloaming Stakes, Trentham Stakes and ARC Welcome Stakes.

His regular rider was Grenville Hughes.

== Stud record ==
He was retired to stud in 1953, but was a disappointing sire. The best of his progeny being Forebrace (won ARC Mitchelson Cup), Main Affair (ARC Ladies Mile) and Native Diver (ARC Queen Elizabeth Handicap). His daughter, Topaz produced Chimbu who won the Auckland Cup and ARC Queen Elizabeth Handicap.

In 2008 Mainbrace was inducted into New Zealand Racing Hall of Fame.

== See also ==
- Thoroughbred racing in New Zealand
- List of leading Thoroughbred racehorses
