= Poetic Prince =

New Zealand thoroughbred racehorse

- Sire: Yeats (USA)
- Grandsire: Nijinsky II (Canada)
- Dam: Finisterre (Aust)
- Damsire: Biscay (Aust)
- Sex: Gelding
- Foaled: 1984
- Colour: Bay
- Trainer: John Wheeler
- Record: 36: 16-8-3
- Earnings: $3,476,499

Poetic Prince, known in Australia as Our Poetic Prince, was an Australian bred and New Zealand trained race-horse that was a top performer at Group 1 level.

== Racing career ==
Poetic Prince was trained by John Wheeler at New Plymouth.

=== Two year old season ===
After a third in his debut race at Ellerslie Racecourse on 18 April 1987, he won his next three races, at Trentham Racecourse and Foxton over 1200m ridden by David Walsh and then Wairarapa (1400m) with Garry Phillips.

He was then taken to Eagle Farm where he raced once, a sixth placing in the Castlemaine Stakes (1600m) on a heavy track behind Flotilla and Hunter.

=== Three year old season ===
Starting his season in New Zealand he won another four races in a row including a Group 3 1200m at Waikato from Weston Lea and Young Indian.

Returning to Australia he performed at the very top level with the following:

- first past the post in the 1987 Caulfield Guineas ridden by Noel Harris but was relegated to second behind Marwong in the Stewards room.
- second in the 1987 Cox Plate, ridden by Gary Phillips, behind Rubiton.
- fourth in the Victoria Derby, with Noel Harris aboard again, behind Omnicorp and All Ashore.

Third up after a spell Noel Harris rode Poetic Prince to a win in the Otaki-Maori Weight for Age over 1600m from Westminster and Courier Bay.

Another visit to Brisbane for four races included two second places, including the Queensland Guineas (1600m) behind Planet Ruler.

=== Four year old season ===
With Noel Harris aboard he won two 1400m weight-for-age races at Waikato and Hawkes Bay and then went to Moonee Valley to claim the 1988 Feehan Stakes (1600M) beating Flotilla, followed by a second in the Caulfield Stakes (2000m) behind Sky Chase.

His next race was his most significant victory, the 1988 Cox Plate where he beat the two kiwi champions, Horlicks and Bonecrusher.

Subsequent performances included the following:

- fourth in the Mackinnon Stakes (2000m) behind Empire Rose and Vo Rogue.
- victory in the Waikato Sprint (1400m) over Courier Bay and Sirstaci.
- third in the Group 1 New Zealand Stakes (2000m) behind The Gentry and Maurine.
- third in the Australian Cup (2000m) beaten by Vo Rogue and Super Impose.
- first in the Tancred Stakes (2400m) over Top Class and Apollo Run.
- winning the Queen Elizabeth Stakes (ATC) (2000m) at Randwick over Dandy Andy and Beau Zam.
- winning the Otaki-Maori Weight for Age (1400m) beating Straight Order and Krona.

His final race was a sixth in the P.J. O'Shea Stakes behind Card Shark and Tawrrific on 3 June 1989.

He was the New Zealand Horse of the Year for the 1988/89 season.

After his racing career he stood as a stallion at stud but was not as successful as he was on the track.

== See also ==
- Thoroughbred racing in New Zealand
