= Show Gate =

New Zealand-bred Thoroughbred racehorse

- Sire: Gatekeeper (GB)
- Grandsire: Alcide (GB)
- Dam: Minglow (NZ)
- Damsire: Globe of Light (GB)
- Sex: Mare
- Foaled: 1969
- Country: New Zealand
- Colour: Bay
- Breeder: Gordon Thomson, Mosgiel
- Owner: Gordon Thomson
- Trainer: Gordon Thomson
- Record: 51:30-7-2
- Earnings: $104,167

Major wins
- Awapuni Gold Cup (1974); Trentham Stakes (1977)

Honours
- New Zealand Racing Hall of Fame; New Zealand Horse of the Year 1975, 1977.
- Last updated on April 3, 2009

Show Gate is a New Zealand Racing Hall of Fame champion thoroughbred racehorse sired by Gatekeeper out of Minglow, a Eulogy mare.

Foaled in 1969, she was horse of the year in 1975 and 1977 and won races from 1200 metres up to 2400 metres in record time. She started in 51 races, winning 30, and was second 7 times, third twice and unplaced in 12 races.

Show Gate was owned, bred and trained by Gordon Thomson of Mosgiel, Dunedin.

== Racing career ==
A mare with an ability to carry big weights over all distances in record times, legendary New Zealand jockey Bob Skelton was quoted to say "She's A Machine" and the "Equal of modern day Hall of Fame mare Sunline"

She won the Stewards, Canterbury Gold Cup and the Churchill Stakes over 1200m, 2000m and 1600m respectively over 7 days at the Canterbury Show week meetings at Riccarton Park. She went on to capture all three twice during her career.

Show Gate suffered a fractured sesamoid bone in the spring of 1974 after winning her first five races as a five-year-old.

She returned to racing as a seven-year-old, winning 7 of her 13 starts, and ran a very unlucky second to Good Lord in the 1977 Wellington Cup over 3200m. Two days later she broke the NZ record over 2400m, 2:26.1 with the top weight of 57 kg on three legs, as she had again gone amiss 1000m from home, her last race. Many fine judges have Show Gate as one of the best mares ever to race in New Zealand.

=== Racing career ===
Notable performances include:

Date	Placing	Race	1st	2nd	3rd
23 April 1973	1st	Great Easter Handicap (1400m, Riccarton)	Show Gate	Lady Mellay	Annenic
3 November 1973	1st	Stewards Handicap (1200m, Riccarton)	Show Gate	Sharda	Kalmia
10 November 1973	1st	Churchill Stakes (1600m, Riccarton)	Show Gate	Zarnia	Kaukapakapa
19 January 1974	1st	Telegraph Handicap (1200m, Trentham)	Show Gate	Sharif	That’s Luck
9 March 1974	1st	North Island Challenge Stakes (1400m)	Show Gate	Count Kereru	Dee Light
12 March 1974	2nd	Port Nicholson Stakes (2000m WFA)	Furys Order	Show Gate	
6 April 1974	1st	Awapuni Gold Cup (2000m)	Show Gate	Jackaroo	Sweet Offer
23 September 1974	1st	South Island Thoroughbred Stakes (1400m, Geraldine)	Show Gate		
9 November 1974	1st	Stewards Handicap	Show Gate	Soliloquy	Paratonnerre
13 November 1974	1st	Canterbury Gold Cup (2000m)	Show Gate	Sobeit	Guest Star
16 November 1974 (1)	1st	Churchill Stakes	Show Gate	Auditor	Harrisand
18 September 1976 (2)	unplaced	Theo Marks Quality Handicap (Sydney)	Ease The Squeeze	Eclipser	Crimson Cloud
6 November 1976	2nd	Stewards Handicap	Grey Way	Show Gate	The Swagger
10 November 1976	1st	Canterbury Gold Cup	Show Gate	Silver Lad	Mayo Mellay
13 November 1976	2nd	Churchill Stakes (1600m, Riccarton)	Tonic Time	Show Gate	
11 December 1976	1st	Thames Valley Stakes (1600m, Te Aroha)	Show Gate		
15 December 1976	2nd	Avondale Cup (2200m)	Paul De Brett	Show Gate	
27 December 1976	1st	Dunedin Gold Cup (2400m)	Show Gate 60.5	Capello	Deep Mystery
28 December 1976	1st	Timaru Gold Cup (1600m)	Show Gate	Mhorlight	Soldier Girl
22 January 1977	2nd	Wellington Cup (3200m)	Good Lord 52.5	Show Gate 57	Our Countess
29 January 1977	1st	Trentham Stakes (2400m)	Show Gate		

- (1) After the Churchill Stakes in November 1974 Show Gate did not race again until August 1976 due to a cracked sesamoid bone.
- (2) This was Show Gate's only Australian race.

== Breeding and progeny ==
Show Gate only produced three foals. Two were colts by Honey Crepe (GB): Sporting Show and Every Show. Later a filly, Show Queen by Balmerino.

Sporting Show won 10 races from 56 starts while Every Show won 11 races from 26 starts. Both raced in the South Island and later served as sires.

Show Queen produced a daughter Showella (by Lord Ballina) who won six races. Her wins included the Group One 2000 New Zealand Stakes and the Group One 1999 South Australian Derby, as well as being group one placed twice. She was the Champion Older horse in New Zealand in 1999-2000.

Showella's first foal Safwa, a filly by Danehill, was sold to Sheikh Mohammed Bin Khalifa Al Maktoumm for $800,000 and went on to win five races in Australia. This included two listed races, the 2007 Japan Racing Association Plate (2000m, Randwick) and the 2007 De Bortoli Wines Epona Stakes (1900m, Rosehill).

Show Gate's great-grandson, Showcause (Giant’s Causeway – Showella) was runner up in the Group One 2011 Auckland Cup and won the Group One 2011 Avondale Cup as well as the City of Auckland Cup (Group 2) and 2010 New Zealand Cup (Group 3). He was the champion stayer in New Zealand 2010-11. In Australia he was placed 4th in the 2011 Geelong Cup behind Dunaden and 3rd in the 2011 The Bart Cummings behind Mourayan.

Show Gate died in 1988 at Prebbleton Farm, Canterbury from complications of spleen cancer.

== See also ==
- Thoroughbred racing in New Zealand
- Grey Way winning the 1976 Awapuni Gold Cup
