= The Filbert (horse) =

New Zealand thoroughbred racehorse

- Sire: Souvran (GB)
- Grandsire: Sovereign Path (GB)
- Dam: Fauxzann
- Damsire: Zamazaan (Fr)
- Sex: Gelding
- Foaled: 1980
- Country: New Zealand
- Colour: Bay or Brown
- Breeder: Mr & Mrs J H Goodman
- Owner: V C French, Mrs B H & C R Gilbert & J H Goodman
- Record: 68: 11-13-11
- Earnings: $669,430.00

Major wins
- New Zealand Stakes (1985)

The Filbert (foaled in 1980) was a New Zealand bred race-horse that was a top performer in New Zealand and internationally at Group 1 level.

== Racing career ==
The Filbert was trained by Don Couchman and Paul Belsham at Hawera.

After winning three races in his early New Zealand racing career, The Filbert had a successful trip to Australia winning at Rosehill on 17 October 1984 and Flemington on 10 November 1984.

His best wins were:

- the 1985 New Zealand Stakes at Ellerslie beating Silver Elm and Shifnal Prince (ridden by Garry Phillips), and
- the 1986 Waikato Cup over 2400m at Te Rapa, beating Bounty Hawk and Run For Cover (Grant Cooksley).

He also had a number of placings in big races such as:

1985/86 season

- third in the Caulfield Stakes behind Tristarc and Lacka Reason (Garry Phillips).
- fourth in the Caulfield Cup behind Tristarc and Our Sophia (Garry Phillips).
- fourth in the Cox Plate behind Rising Prince and Roman Artist (Garry Phillips).
- third in the Mackinnon Stakes behind Rising Prince and So Vague (Garry Phillips).
- third in the Japan Cup behind Symboli Rudolf and Rocky Tiger (Garry Phillips).

1986/87 season

- second in the Feehan Stakes behind Dazzling Duke (G Murphy).
- fourth in the Underwood Stakes behind Bonecrusher and At Talaq (H White).
- fourth in the Caulfield Stakes behind Bonecrusher and Black Knight (G Murphy).
- third in the Cox Plate behind Bonecrusher and Waverley Star (G Murphy). This race became known as the Race of the Century.

== See also ==
- Thoroughbred racing in New Zealand
