= Easter Handicap =

New Zealand horse race

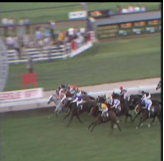
- Grey Way winning the 1977 Easter Handicap
- Class: Group III
- Location: Ellerslie Racecourse; Auckland, New Zealand
- Inaugurated: 1874
- Race type: Thoroughbred - Flat racing
- Website: www.ellerslie.co.nz

Race information
- Distance: 1600m (1 miles)
- Surface: Turf
- Track: right-handed
- Qualification: Three-year-olds and up
- Weight: Handicap
- Purse: $150,000 (2026)

The Easter Handicap or Easter Stakes is a major horse race held at Ellerslie Racecourse in Auckland, New Zealand. It is raced over a distance of 1,600 metres (approximately 1 mile) by three-year-old and upwards thoroughbreds.

== Race history ==
Although previously a Group 1 race, from 2017 it was reclassified to Group 2 and from 2022 to Group 3 level.

In 2016, the conditions of the race changed from a handicap to set weight and penalties, but reverted back to handicap conditions in 2018.

The race has been won by many of New Zealand's greatest milers, including Kindergarten (twice), Sleepy Fox (four times) and Grey Way.

The Easter Handicap is now raced in mid/late April on the same date as the Championship Stakes.

== Winners Since 1965 ==
Year	Winner	Sire	Dam	Jockey	Trainer	Time	Second	Third
2026	Lupo Solitario 53	Satono Aladdin	She's Aloof	Wiremu Pinn	Danica Guy, Matamata	1:36.98 (soft)	Top Shelf 53	Cannon Hill 56
2025	Doctor Askar 53	Derryn (Aus)	Petipas Delight	Joe Doyle	Joanne Moss, Waverley	1:36.51 (soft)	Tardelli 53	Electron 53
2024 (Te Rapa)	Snazzytavi 53	Tavistock	Ritzy Lady	Warren Kennedy	Graham Richardson & Rogan Norvall	1.36.89 (soft)	Chattahoochie 53	Channel Surfer 53
2023 (Pukekohe)	White Noise	El Roca	White Nymph	Michael NcNab	Andrew Forsman	1:42.54 (heavy)	Habana 57	Tavattack 58
2022 (Pukekohe)	Carolina Reaper 53	Vespa	Bonney Pepper	Ashvin Goindasamy (a)	Graham Richardson & Rogan Norvall, Matamata	1:37.73 (Good)	Brando 57.5	True Enough 59
2021	Demonetization 55	All Too Hard	Midnight Special	Samantha Collett	Nigel Tiley, Pukekohe	1:38.72 (Slow)	Hasabro 52	Marroni 52
2020	Race not held							
2019	Endless Drama 59	Lope De Vega (Ire)	Desert Drama (Ire)	Leith Innes	Tony Pike, Cambridge	1:33.45	Watch This Space 55	Yearn 52
2018 (Pukekohe)	Megablast 57.5	Shinko King (Ire)	Thirst	Michael Coleman	Nigel Tiley, Pukekohe	1:42.32	Brighton 52	Romancer 52.5
2017	Seventh Up 55	Shinko King (Ire)	Regelle	Grant Cooksley	Shelley Hale	1:36.04	Hiflyer 55	Let Me Roar 53
2016	Sound Proposition 55	Savabeel	Ebony Babe	Michael Coleman	Lance O'Sullivan & Andrew Scott, Matamata	1:33.29	Trojan Warrior 55	Rasa Lila 54
2015	Pondarosa Miss 52	High Chaparral (Ire)	Bak Da Princess	Daniel Hain	Peter Hollinshead	1:38.50	Vespa 52	Kawi 55.5
2014	Albany Reunion 52.5	Fastnet Rock (Aus)	Secret Silence (Aus)	Mark Du Plessis	Nigel Tiley, Pukekohe	1:35.28	Chintz 55	Rollout The Carpet (Aus) 52
2013	Viadana 57.5	Towkay (Aus)	Yeah Nah	Mark Du Plessis	Lance Noble, Matamata	1:34.62	Postmans Daughter 56.5	Our Famous Eve 53.5
2012	Veyron 59	Thorn Park (Aus)	Over The Limit	Rogan Norvall	Linda Laing, Cambridge	1:35.40	Postmans Daughter 54	Fleur De Lune 54.5
2011	Veyron 57	Thorn Park (Aus)	Over The Limit	Rogan Norvall	Linda Laing, Cambridge	1:38.79	Fears Nothing 55	Sir Slick 59
2010	Time Keeper 51	Stravinsky (USA)	Organdy (USA)	Mark Sweeney	Graeme Nicholson & Paul Allbon, Pukekohe	1:34.20	November Rain 51	Sir Slick 59
2009	Prince Kaapstad 53	Kaapstad	Brilliant Princess	Samantha Spratt	Richard Yuill	1:35.10	Irish Opera 52.5	My Astron 56
2008	Pasta Post 54	Postponed (USA)	Blue Heaven	Craig Grylls	Graeme & Mark Sanders, Te Awamutu	1:33.02	Sterling Prince 53	Culminate 53
2007	Floydeboy 55	Mallifont (USA)	Fleche D’or	Mark Hills	Bernard Dyke, Cambridge	1:37.80	Dezigna 56.5	Polish Princess (GB) 51
2006	Rags To Riches 53.5	Entrepreneur (GB)	Candescent	Michael Coleman	Ralph Manning, Cambridge	1:35.41	Korau Road 52.5	La Sizeranne 54
2005	Calveen 54	Canny Lad (Aus)	Calvinia (Aus)	Cameron Lammas	Lance O'Sullivan, Matamata	1:35.16	Kristov 56	British Ensign 54
2004	Pomp and Glory 54	Pompeii Court (USA)	Aptitude	Opie Bosson	Alan & Brett Mcdonald, Cambridge	1:32.29	Rodrigo Rose 52.5	Jet Ski 54
2003	Sedecrem 54.5	Faltaat (USA)	Real Trier (Aus)	Grant Cooksley	Colin Jillings & Richard Yuill, Takanini	1:33.95	Jet Ski 54	Millennium 53
2002	Honor Bound 55	Honor Grades (USA)	Amrica	Lance O'Sullivan	Terry Wenn, Te Aroha	1:34.74	Jet Ski 55	St Therese (Aus) 52
2001	Magic Winner 54	Mighty Grey (Aus)	Hagen's Pride	Mark Sweeney	Graeme & Debbie Sanders, Te Awamutu	1:37.85	O’Malley's Boy 54	Conference 57
2000	Zayyad 53.5	Mohamed Abdu (Ire)	Pompeii Girl	Matthew Williamson	Robbie Sims, Pukekohe	1:36.37	Cinder Bella 54	Resonare 56
1999	Oregon Power 54.5	Oregon (USA)	Gypsy Invader	Michelle Wenn (Brooks)	Jim Gibbs & Eric Betty, Matamata	1:33.18	Intergrate (AUS) 54	The Mighty Finn 56
1998	Aimee Jay 52	Famous Star (Ire)	Mini Mandy	Kelly Davidson	Aiden Schumacher, Stratford	1:32.3	Fatal 52	Oregon Power 53
1997	Moss Downs 50.5	Toms Shu (USA)	La Moss	Lance O'Sullivan	Chris McNab	1:32.34	Jazzac 50	Secret Hero 54
1996	Cactus Jack 49.5	Foxbay	Barbara Jan	Toby Brett	David Cole	1:36.3	Magnet Bay 50	Roys Boy 52.5
1995	Pakaraka Star 49.5	Starjo	Royal Vain	Trudy Thornton	Sidney Gulliver, Waverley	1:41.26	Matsqui (Aus)	Roys Boy 52
1994	Ball Park 53	Ahonoora (GB)	Tears For Fears (Aus)	Tony Allan	Michael Moroney & Graham Richardson, Matamata	1:34.16	Lord Tridan 58	Cuidado 57
1993	Moire 51	Crested Wave (USA)	Little Tern (Ire)	Lisa Cropp	Carl Peterson, Te Awamutu	1:34.38	Kiwi Golfer 51	Mahoenui Lass 49.8
1992	Carson's Cash 51.5	Lord Ballina (Aus)	Cashelmara	Vincent Colgan	Roger James, Cambridge	1:33.94	Balmacara 52	Mr Impose 51
1991	Rays Hope 51.3	Star Way (GB)	Belltello	Lisa Cropp	Kerry Verner, Takanini	1:35.2	Javelin 51.8	Seamist 53.3
1990	Status 52	Truly Vain (Aus)	Georgie	Grant Cooksley	Jack Georgetti	1:33.66	Echo Lass 50.5	Pikorrie 50
1989	Regal City 56	Licorice Stick	Gay City	Debbie Healey	Jim Gibbs, Matamata	1:32.67	Trissaring 50.5	Squire Gray 53
1988	Sirstaci 52	Silver Dream (GB)	Eustaci	Tony Allan	Peter Simpson, Cambridge	1:34.55	Bourbon Boy 55.5	Ticavaboy 51.5
1987	Field Dancer 50	Star Way (GB)	Field Nymph	Michael Coleman	Jim Gibbs & Roger James, Matamata	1:38.10	Arctic Wolf 51.5	Star Pride 48
1986	Cosmetique 49	Barcas (USA)	Lizabeth	Gary Grylls	Bill Ford & Roger Verry, Matamata	1:34.40	Waverley Star 51.5	Infinite Secret 50
1985	Eastern Joy 50	Three Legs (GB)	Diatrelic	Lance O'Sullivan	Dave & Paul O'Sullivan, Matamata	1:36.54	Magnitude 52	Atraper 55.5
1984	Idaho's Gift 56.5	Rich Gift (GB)	Veruschka	Earl Harrison	Don Couchman, Hawera	1:33.28	Macs Gamble 54	Abit Leica 52.5
1983	Clear Gold 55	Bahroona (Ca)	Hebrew Gold	Grant Cooksley	I P Morton, Whakatane	1:33.19	Pride of Rosewood 53	Debs Mate 57.5
1982	Our Shah 56.6	Shahram (GB)	Our Rene	Chris McNab	Dave & Paul O'Sullivan & Michael Moroney, Matamata	1:37.84	Asheen 50	Givenchy 57.5
1981	Shivaree 58	Sharivari	Just a Lark	Garry Phillips	Dave O’Sullivan, Matamata	1:41.04	Master Grey 54	River Queen 55
1980	Silver Nymph 51.5	Silver Dream (GB)	Crestello	Warwick Robinson	Gary Mudgway, Te Rapa	1:37.05	Heidelberg 52.5	Stormee 56.5
1979	Stipulwin 52.5	Stipulate	Winnie’s Last	Paul Hillis	C Tatton, Cambridge	1:40.57	Aghios Nikalaos 51	Heidelberg 52
1978	Silver Wraith 51.25	Silver Dream (GB)	Crestello	Peter Johnson	Laurie Laxon, Te Rapa	1:34	Orchida 54.5	Shivaree 49.5
1977	Grey Way 60.5	Grey William (GB)	Waybrook	Bob Skelton	Pat Corboy, Washdyke	1:34.74	Vice Regal 52	= Tudor light and Kiwi Can
1976	Tudor Light 56	All A’Light	Elabama	Warwick Robinson	John Malcolm, Te Rapa	1:35.7	Shaitan 48	Melody Belle 55
1975	Kiwi Can 57.5	Hasty Cloud (Ire)	Naughty Ngarie	Roger Lang	Fred Beguely, Matamata	1:33.2	Bay Sovereign 49	Bay Boss 49.5
1974	Turfcutter 50.5	Oncidium (GB)	Entrancing Belle	Peter Johnson	Ray Verner, Takanini	1:34.8	Pheroz Jewel 51.5	Curly Wave 51.5
1973	Nordic Star 7.12	Copenhagen II (GB)	Glamour Fair	Gary Willetts	Gestro & McEwan, Hawera	1:43		
1972	Kia Marea 8.1	Stunning (GB)	Kia U	John Grylls	Tom Mathieson, Hawera	1:37		
1971	Evenstead 7.10	Even Stevens	Lady Janice	Noel Riordan	Fred Phillips, Matangi	1:35.8		
1970	Patrida 7.9	Pharamond (Fra)	Forever	David Raklander	Stuart McColl, Woodville	1:36		
1969	Choucuana	Minuit (GB)	Cousette	Rodney Heaslip	Bill Sanders, Te Awamutu			
1968	Tara's Pride	Pride of Kildare (Ire)	Fox Amber	Bill Skelton	Jim Didham, Stratford			
1967	Valiant Rebel	Resurgent (Ire)	Valiant Rose	David Peake	Pat McIllroy, Takanini			
1966	Rochdale	Alpheus (GB)	Fairy Treasure	J Humphries	Bill Sanders, Te Awamutu			
1965	My Call	Summertime (GB)	Often	David Raklander	Bill Sanders, Te Awamutu			

Ref:

== Previous winners ==
- 1964 - Tasman Sea
- 1963 - Final Command
- 1962 - Otematata
- 1961 - Waipari
- 1960 - Waipari
- 1959 - Marie Brizard
- 1958 - Japonica
- 1957 - Solepic
- 1956 - Coleridge
- 1955 - Fair Chance
- 1954 - Tesla
- 1953 - Misprint
- 1952 - Peter Boy
- 1951 - Wandering Ways
- 1950 - Lord Revel
- 1949 - Rosslare
- 1948 - Iwo Jima
- 1947 - Sleepy Fox
- 1946 - Sleepy Fox
- 1945 - Sleepy Fox
- 1944 - Sleepy Fox
- 1943 - Landveyor
- 1942 - Kindergarten
- 1941 - Kindergarten
- 1940 - Black Thread
- 1939 - Beaupartir
- 1938 - Francis Drake
- 1937 - Tooley Street
- 1936 - Royal Appellant
- 1935 - Red Manfred
- 1934 - Jonathan
- 1933 - Golden Wings
- 1932 - Great Star
- 1931 - Hunting Cry
- 1930 - Pegaway
- 1929 - Bright Glow
- 1928 - In The Shade
- 1927 - Civility
- 1926 - Reremoana
- 1925 - Reremoana
- 1924 - Hipo
- 1923 - Roseday
- 1922 - Grotesque
- 1921 - Silver Link
- 1920 - Gazique
- 1919 - Uncle Ned
- 1918 - Parisian Diamond
- 1917 - Menelaus
- 1916 - Chortle
- 1915 - Merry Roe
- 1914 - Ventura
- 1913 - Jack Delaval
- 1912 - Kakama
- 1911 - Antoinette
- 1910 - Waiari
- 1909 - Aborigine
- 1908 - Gold Crest
- 1907 - Waipuna
- 1906 - Mobility
- 1905 - Scotty
- 1904 - Regulation
- 1903 - Golden Rose
- 1902 - Nonette
- 1901 - Rosella
- 1900 - Advance
- 1899 - Rex
- 1898 - Rex
- 1897 - Day Star
- 1896 - Acone
- 1895 - Folly
- 1894 - Lottie
- 1893 - Impulse
- 1892 - Cynisca
- 1891 - Impulse
- 1890 - Hilda
- 1889 - Leorina
- 1888 - Friendship
- 1887 - Spade Guinea
- 1886 - Clogs
- 1885 - Turquoise
- 1884 - Radames/The Administrator
- 1883 - Leonora
- 1882 - Louie
- 1881 - King Quail
- 1880 - Yatapa
- 1879 - Yatapa
- 1878 - Elsa
- 1877 - Bide A Wee
- 1876 - Parawhenua
- 1875 - Yatterina
- 1874 - Batter

== See also ==
- Thoroughbred racing in New Zealand
- Championship Stakes
- Awapuni Gold Cup
- Zabeel Classic
- New Zealand Stakes
