= Waverley Star =

New Zealand-bred Thoroughbred racehorse

- Sire: Star Way (GB)
- Dam: Super Show (GB)
- Damsire: Great Nephew (GB)
- Sex: Gelding
- Foaled: 16 November 1982
- Country: New Zealand
- Colour: Chestnut
- Breeder: Mrs D M Davison & Mrs R Lamb
- Owner: Waverley Park Stud Pty Ltd.
- Trainer: Dave & Paul O'Sullivan
- Record: 34: 13-6-3
- Earnings: $798,617

Major wins
- Chipping Norton Stakes (1987); Zabeel Classic (1986)
- Last updated on 26 May 2022

Waverley Star (foaled 1982) was a New Zealand Thoroughbred racehorse who is best remembered for finishing second to Bonecrusher in the 1986 Cox Plate – widely referred to as the 'race of the century'. Waverley Star, who was known as Our Waverley Star in Australia to distinguish him from a 1976 foaling of the same name, won his maiden race as a three-year-old on 30 November 1985 at Pukekohe. Prior to his first visit to Australia, for the Cox Plate, he had 13 starts for 10 wins and 2 placings in New Zealand. This included:

- 2nd in the Castlemaine XXXX Easter Stakes (Group One 1600m) behind Cosmetique, with Infinite Secret third.
- 1st in the Television New Zealand Stakes (Group Two 2000m WFA) beating Solveig and Santanea
- 1st in the Admiralty Handicap (1200m) at Ellerslie on 23 August 1986 when he beat Matthew Ryan with Bonecrusher third.

In the Cox Plate, he was installed 3/1 second-favourite behind fellow New Zealander Bonecrusher, who was 6/4-on. With 800 metres to run in the Cox Plate, Lance O'Sullivan took Waverley Star to the lead, with Gary Stewart on Bonecrusher right behind him. The two horses then raced well clear of the field, with little between them for the remainder of the race, and at the post, Bonecrusher was narrowly in front. The Filbert placed third to make a New Zealand trifecta.

He won one of the lead-ups to the 1986 Japan Cup, in which he finished fifth behind Jupiter Island (GB), Allez Milord (USA) and two Japanese horses.

Waverley Star had a further 20 starts after the Cox Plate, for three wins including the Chipping Norton Stakes in March 1987 beating Diamond Shower and Abit Leica. He was then placed second in both the 1987 Rawson Stakes (2000m) and Tancred Stakes (2400m), carrying 57kg, easily beaten on both occasions by Myocard who carried 53kg and 52kg respectively.

He had his final start in June 1989, as a six-year-old, after failing to recapture his best form.

Waverley Star died in 2015.

== See also ==
- Youtube video – the "Race of the Century"
- Thoroughbred racing in New Zealand
