= Hail (horse) =

New Zealand-bred Thoroughbred racehorse

- Sire: Stark South
- Grandsire: Dixieland Band
- Dam: Valley Court
- Damsire: Pompeii Court
- Sex: Gelding
- Foaled: 27 September 1997
- Country: New Zealand
- Colour: Chestnut
- Breeder: Fayette Park Stud
- Owner: Alistair J Cunningham & Bruce Marsh
- Trainer: Bruce Marsh
- Record: 50:9-8-5
- Earnings: $1,141,501

Major wins
- New Zealand Derby (2000); Zabeel Classic (2003); Sandown Classic (2002)
- Last updated on July 3, 2007

Hail (foaled 27 September 1997) is a thoroughbred racehorse who won the New Zealand Derby in 2000, ridden by Noel Harris.

He was bred by Waikanae couple Barry and Hazel Clevely from Valley Court (NZ) (Pompeii Court). Hail was owned by trainer Bruce Marsh and Alistair Cunningham after being purchased as a yearling for $17,000 at the Karaka sales.

In seven years of racing, Hail established for himself a reputation of reliability, strength and durability. Although he only won two Group 1 races, he finished in the first four in a further eight, including a fourth in the Wellington Cup under topweight. He also won the 2002 New Zealand St. Leger over 2500m at Trentham Racecourse.

He is one of the few New Zealand Derby winners in recent times to have tasted success in Australia, with his win in the Group 2 Sandown Classic in late 2002.

== See also ==
- Thoroughbred racing in New Zealand
