= Bonecrusher (horse) =

New Zealand-bred Thoroughbred racehorse

- Sire: Pag-Asa
- Grandsire: Kaoru Star
- Dam: Imitation
- Damsire: Oakville
- Sex: Gelding
- Foaled: 1982
- Country: New Zealand
- Colour: Chestnut
- Breeder: Bill Punch
- Owner: Peter J. Mitchell
- Trainer: Frank Ritchie
- Record: 44: 18-5-12
- Earnings: NZ$674,225 & A$1,679,495

Major wins
- Bayer Classic (1985); New Zealand Derby (1985); Air New Zealand Stakes (1986 & 1988); Tancred Stakes (1986); Australian Derby (1986); Caulfield Stakes (1986); W. S. Cox Plate (1986); Underwood Stakes (1986); Australian Cup (1987)

Honours
- New Zealand Racing Hall of Fame; Australian Horse of the Year (1987)
- Last updated on 26 June 2007

Bonecrusher (17 September 1982 – 10 June 2015) was a champion New Zealand Thoroughbred racehorse who was widely admired in both Australia and New Zealand.

Bred by Bill Punch, by the sire Pag-Asa, his dam's sire was a son of a French champion, Tantieme. Pag-Asa was brought to New Zealand by Owen Larson.

Bonecrusher was purchased by Peter Mitchell for just NZ$3,250 at the Waikato Yearling Sales, and was trained by Frank Ritchie. Peter also bought Bonecrusher's full brother. A chestnut, Bonecrusher was nicknamed Big Red - the same name as the champions Man o' War, Secretariat and Phar Lap.

== Racing career ==
His trainer was Frank Ritchie, and his strapper was Frank’s son Shaune Ritchie. Frank was trying to establish himself in the top echelon of trainers, while Shaune was sixteen and straight out of high school. "I was battling away, and although I had trained a Group winner in Australia, it was when he arrived that it really changed my life," Frank said.

All up, Bonecrusher raced 44 times for 18 wins, 5 second places, and 12 third places. His races ranged from 880m to 2400m. He won 9 Group One races, 3 Group 2 races, and 2 Group 3 races, and earned prize money of NZ$674,225 and Au$1,679,495. He was the first New Zealand racehorse to win over NZ$1 million in prize money, and his combined New Zealand and Australia career earnings were approximately 3 million dollars. Bonecrusher won four Group One races in New Zealand, including the New Zealand Derby, and six Group One races in Australia: the Tancred Stakes, the Australian Derby, the Underwood Stakes, the Caulfield Stakes, the Cox Plate, and the Australian Cup.

Bonecrusher first hit the track in August 1984 where he won three of his first five starts as a juvenile including one at Group Three) level at Ellerslie before embarking on an ill-fated three race campaign in Australia.

Brought home after three lacklustre runs, he commenced his three-year-old campaign with four consecutive placings including finishing third behind Random Chance and Field Dancer in the 1985 Group One New Zealand 2000 Guineas run at 1600m at Riccarton. Ritchie was convinced that trip away was the making of the horse. "He had hurt himself in an incident on the truck before he went to Christchurch and missed a lot of work," he said. "He went into the 2000 Guineas underdone and I thought at the time the race would either flatten him or bring him on and thankfully it was the latter."

Bonecrusher won his next seven starts straight including the Group 1 Bayer Classic (1600m) and the Group 1 New Zealand Derby (2400m), before defeating the older horses in the Group 1 Air New Zealand Stakes (2000m) at Ellerslie Racecourse in Auckland.

Then he went to Sydney and won the Group 1 H E Tancred Stakes (2400m) and finished off with a win in the Group 1 Australian Derby (2400m).

Bonecrusher scaled his greatest heights in the spring of 1986 in the Cox Plate, where he prevailed in the 'Race of the Century' with another New Zealand champion, Waverley Star. The horses went to war from the 600m mark and separated themselves from the rest of the field, with Bonecrusher narrowly prevailing in a head-to-head struggle that caller Bill Collins summed up with the famous line "Bonecrusher races into equine immortality." Amongst the onlookers was strapper and now-successful trainer Shaune Ritchie. "I was sixteen and left school to go and look after the horse in Melbourne for that campaign," Shaune said. "It was a pretty big thing as back then an OE (overseas experience) wasn’t a normal thing so just to go to Australia was a big trip. After the race it was just amazing and I still remember the way the crowd stayed on to greet him and watch the presentation after the race. Australians are punters and normally when a race is finished, they are off to the bookies to bet on the next race coming up."

Later that year, Bonecrusher was the pre-post favourite against some of the world's best racehorses in the Japan Cup but contracted a virus in Tokyo, nearly lost his life, and withdrew from the race.

The next year, he had recovered from his illness and won the 1987 Australian Cup, beating At Talaq, and was named Horse of the Year in New Zealand and Australia for the 1986–1987 season. He was the first horse to be awarded both titles. He was also a Government appointed 'Equine Ambassador' for New Zealand in 1986.

Bonecrusher continued to campaign at five, six, and seven years of age. He won three races in New Zealand, including a second Air New Zealand Stakes in 1988, but was unable to reach his previous heights in Australia.

Bonecrusher's racing career included the following:

Year	Placing	Race	Venue	Distance	Jockey	Winning Time	1st	2nd	3rd
31 August 1984	4th	2YO colts & geldings	Avondale	800m	Gary Stewart	49.83 (heavy)	Bold Edition 54.3	Bon Sang 54.3	Chief Mayo 54.3
26 October 1984	1st	2YO colts & geldings	Ellerslie	840m	Gary Stewart	49.27 (good)	Bonecrusher 54	Blue Kingdom 54.3	Bright Kiwi 54
3 Nov 1984	3rd	2YO	Counties	880m	Gary Stewart	-	Orangeade 49 (heavy)	Petersburg 55	Bonecrusher 54.5
6 Feb 1985	1st	2YO	TROA	1200m	Gary Stewart	1:11.71 (good)	Bonecrusher 55	Anglo Saxon 53	Nostalgia 54.5
23 Feb 1985	1st	Eclipse Stakes (G3)	Ellerslie	1200m	Gary Stewart	1:10.13 (good)	Bonecrusher 53.5	Star Board 57	Princess Carbine 49.5 (Relegated from 1st)
18 March 1985	5th	Brambles Classic	Kembla Grange	1200m	Gary Stewart	1:09.6 (good)	Swift Cheval 52	Comedy Star 52	
8 April 1985	8th	2YO colts and geldings race	Randwick	1200m	R Quinton	(good)	Piccata 52	Rass Flyer 52	
13 April 1985	4th	T L Baillieu Handicap	Randwick	1400m	David Walsh	1:25.1 (good)	Swift Cheval 56	Gippsland 48	Willara Prince
14 Sep 1985	3rd	C3	Hawkes Bay	1200m	Gary Stewart	1:09.79 (good)	Chuckka Khan 51	Laurent 57	Bonecrusher 55
5 Oct 1985	3rd	Winstone Guineas Trial (listed, 3YO)	Ellerslie	1400m	Gary Stewart	1:23.64 (good)	Honour Bright 55.5	Hot Ice 55.5	Bonecrusher 55.5
12 Oct 1985	2nd	Winstone Guineas (G2)	Ellerslie	1600m	Gary Stewart	1:34.38 (good)	Avon's Lord 55.5	Bonecrusher 55.5	Honour Bright 55.5
13 Nov 1985	3rd	New Zealand 2000 Guineas (G1)	Riccarton	1600m	Gary Stewart	1:35.48 (good)	Random Chance 55.5	Field Dancer 55.5	Bonecrusher 55.5
27 Nov 1985	1st	Bayer Classic (G1)	Levin	1600m	Jim Cassidy	1:36.90 (good)	Bonecrusher 55.5	French Polish 53	Seadreamer 53
14 Dec 1985	1st	Auckland Breeders Avondale Guineas	Avondale	2000m	Gary Stewart	2:03.05 (good)	Bonecrusher 55.5	Hot Ice 55.5	Flight Bijou 55.5
26 Dec 1985	1st	New Zealand Derby (G1)	Ellerslie	2400m	Gary Stewart	2:29.47 (good)	Bonecrusher 55.5	Flight Bijou 55.5	Random Chance 55.5
11 Feb 1986	1st	Cambridge Stud International Stakes	Te Rapa	2000m	Gary Stewart	1:59.59 (good)	Bonecrusher 52.25	Eva Grace 56.5	Coronal 58
22 Feb 1986	1st	Air New Zealand Stakes WFA	Ellerslie	2000m	Gary Stewart	2:02.21 (good)	Bonecrusher 52.5	Abit Leica 58	Lacka Reason 58
22 March 1986	1st	H E Tancred Stakes	Rosehill	2400m	Gary Stewart	2:31.10 (good)	Bonecrusher 52	Rant And Rave 52	Abit Leica 58.5
29 March 1986	1st	AJC Derby	Randwick	2400m	Gary Stewart	2:35.60 (good)	Bonecrusher 56	Handy Proverb 56	Agent Provocative 55.5
23 Aug 1986	3rd	C1	Ellerslie	1200m	Gary Stewart	1:18.02 (heavy)	Waverley Star 56.5	Matthew Ryan 51	Bonecrusher 58
6 Sep 1986	2nd	WFA (G3)	Wanganui	1600m	Gary Stewart	1:36.1 (dead)	Bourbon Boy 57	Bonecrusher 57	Great Estate 58.5
25 Sep 1986	1st	Underwood Stakes	Caulfield	2000m	Gary Stewart	2:01.1 (good)	Bonecrusher 57	At Talaq 59	Black Knight 59
11 Oct 1986	1st	Caulfield Stakes	Caulfield	2000m	Gary Stewart	2:00.60 (good)	Bonecrusher 57	Black Knight 59	My Tristram's Belle 54.5
25 Oct 1986	1st	Cox Plate	Moonee Valley	2040m	Gary Stewart	2:07.20 (dead)	Bonecrusher 57	Waverley Star 57	The Filbert 59
10 Feb 1987	4th	Waikato Sprint (G1)	Te Rapa	1400m	Gary Stewart	1:20.73 (good)	Courier Bay 57	Arctic Wolf 53.3	Tidal Light 51.5
28 Feb 1987	1st	C1	Avondale	1625m	Gary Stewart	1:33.9 (good)	Bonecrusher 59	Chickero 51	Out Of Sight 50.5
9 March 1987	1st	Australian Cup	Flemington	2000m	Gary Stewart	2:05.6 (good)	Bonecrusher 57	At Talaq 58	Ima Red Man 57
28 March 1987	3rd	Rawson Stakes	Rosehill	2000m	Shane Dye	2:02.9 (dead)	Myocard 53	Waverley Star 57	Bonecrusher 57
13 Feb 1988	1st	White Robe Lodge Stakes (G3)	Wingatui	1600m	Gary Stewart	1:36.80 (good)	Bonecrusher 57.5	Robinski 50	Slick Million 53
27 Feb 1988	1st	Air New Zealand Stakes WFA (G1)	Ellerslie	2000m	Gary Stewart	2:02.51 (good)	Bonecrusher 58	Horlicks 55.5	Sounds Like Fun 55.5
14 March 1988	3rd	Australian Cup	Flemington	2000m	Gary Stewart	2:01.5 (good)	Dandy Andy 57	Vo Rogue 57	Bonecrusher 58
9 April 1988	2nd	WFA (G1)	Ellerslie	2000m	Peter Tims	2:03.72 (good)	Horlicks 56	Bonecrusher 58	Sounds Like Fun 56
8 May 1988	2nd	Queen Elizabeth Stakes	Canberra	2000m	Jim Cassidy	2:07.18 (dead)	Beau Zam 54	Bonecrusher 58	Dandy Andy
20 Aug 1988	4th	WFA	Te Rapa	1400m	Gary Stewart	1:31.23 (heavy)	Poetic Prince 57	Regal Affair 56.3	Tri Belle 56
10 Sep 1988	2nd	C1	Ellerslie	1575m	Gary Stewart	1:39.52 (slow)	Saci 52	Bonecrusher 58.5	March Sea 53.5
1 Oct 1988	1st	WFA	Taranaki	2000m	Gary Stewart	2:13.6 (heavy)	Bonecrusher	The Filbert 59	Classic Bay 59
22 Oct 1988	3rd	Cox Plate	Moonee Valley	2040m	Gary Stewart	2:06.9 (good)	Poetic Prince 57	Horlicks 56	Bonecrusher 59
27 Nov 1988	8th	Japan Cup	Tokyo	2400m	Gary Stewart	2:25.5 (soft)	Pay the Butler (USA) 57	Tamamo Cross (JPN) 57	Oguri Cap (JPN) 55
28 Jan 1989	3rd	Jarden Mile	Trentham	1600m	Peter Tims	1:35.84 (good)	Tricavaboy 51	Sirstaci 49.5	Bonecrusher 58
14 Feb 1989	5th	New Zealand International Stakes	Te Rapa	2000m	Peter Tims	2:00.55 (good)	Regal City 57	Horlicks 56.5	Westminster 57
4 Mar 1989	8th	DB Draught Classic	Ellerslie	2100m	Peter Tims	2:07.09 (good)	Horlicks 56.5	Regal City 57	Westminster 57
1 Apr 1989	3rd	WFA	Ellerslie	2000m	Gary Stewart	2:03.65 (good)	Trissaring 57	Sirstaci 58	Bonecrusher 58
9 Dec 1989	3rd	Star Way Stakes	Ellerslie	1600m	Gary Stewart	1:34.24 (good)	Krona 57	Regal City 58	Bonecrusher 58
28 Dec 1989	5th	Waikato Stud Kings Plate	Ellerslie	1600m	Gary Stewart	1:35.6 (good)	Regal City 58	Red Legend 57	Money Market 57

== Retirement ==
After retirement Bonecrusher was cared for by his owner, Peter Mitchell, on a property in Takanini. In retirement, he was a guest of the Moonee Valley Racing Club. His last public appearance was Derby Day in 2003. In 2010, he was inducted into the New Zealand Racing Hall of Fame. Bonecrusher was euthanised in June 2015 after contracting laminitis.

Bonecrusher was buried beside the saddling paddock at Ellerslie Racecourse, as he won his first race, his first Group race, and all three of his New Zealand Group One races at Ellerslie. A bronze statue was set above him. The life-sized replica is of the champion racehorse in action and includes his famous shoulder scar and unique protruding tongue. At the end of the plaque below the statue, it says 'Bonecrusher: The Pride of Ellerslie'

"To see Bonecrusher immortalised like this stirs a lot of emotion and brings back a lot of great memories," his trainer Frank Ritchie said.

"People still want to talk about him to this day and in a radio interview I did recently I think I spent three minutes talking about my runners in the Auckland Cup and the New Zealand Oaks, and another 17 minutes on Bonecrusher, a horse that retired 30 years ago."

"He didn’t have the brilliance of Black Caviar or the dominance of Winx, but why people loved him so much was his courage, and when it looked like he couldn’t win, he would win. I doubt that there has been a story written about Dad or I that hasn’t included Bonecrusher somewhere in it and I have no problem with that as who doesn’t want to be associated with such a wonderful animal."

"The fact that every day you go to Ellerslie you see the magnificent statue there of him, that he is buried underneath, is very special and it is very nice to have."

Bonecrusher's strapper Shaune Ritchie, became a trainer at Cambridge and his successes have included:

- Military Move: the 2010 New Zealand Derby winner
- Magic Cape: 2006 New Zealand 2000 Guineas winner and runner-up in the 2007 Kelt Capital Stakes.

== In popular culture ==
In October 1986, Bonecrusher's achievements on the track became the inspiration for a song released by fellow Ellerslie locals, Wayne Cann, Gordon Evans and John Scull. Titled "Tribute to a Champion", the song promoted Bonecrusher as a New Zealand Sports Ambassador, and featured lyrics which stated that he could be "the greatest since Phar Lap" and named him as the "pride of Ellerslie". While not available in stores, fans were asked to send orders through the "Bonecrusher Song Child Cancer Appeal", which donated NZ$1 from each sale to the child cancer foundation.

An anthropomorphized version of Bonecrusher, called Ellerslie Pride appears as a character in the manga Uma Musume: Cinderella Gray.

== See also ==
- Thoroughbred racing in New Zealand
- The Bonecrusher New Zealand Stakes - Bonecrusher won this race in 1986 and 1988 when it was known as the Air New Zealand Stakes.
