= New Zealand Racing Hall of Fame =

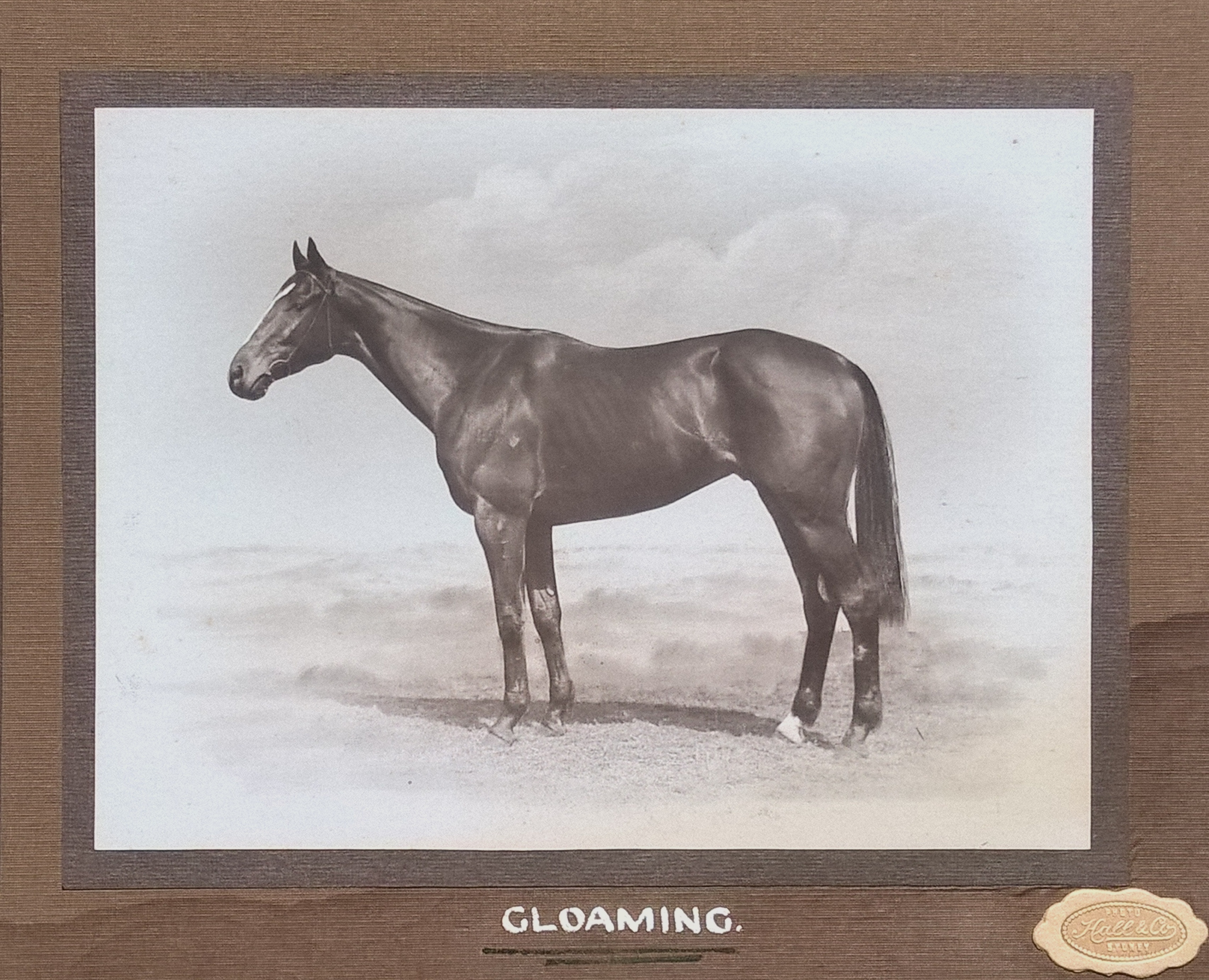
Gloaming, 2006 inductee.

The New Zealand Racing Hall of Fame recognises and honours those whose achievements have enriched the New Zealand thoroughbred horse racing industry.

== History ==
The Hall of Fame's first group of honorees were inducted in 2006, and inductions are held every other year. The inaugural chairman was Gerald Fell.

Due to COVID-19, the 2020 Induction dinner scheduled for 3 May 2020 was postponed. At that stage, three inductees had been announced: Mufhasa, James McDonald and Sir Peter Vela. The dinner was held on 2 May 2021 and nine new inductees were welcomed.

== Horses ==
- Balmerino (2008)
- Beau Vite (2023)
- Bonecrusher (2010)
- Brookby Song (2018)
- Carbine (2006)
- Castletown (2014)
- Cuddle (2014)
- Daryl's Joy (2016)
- Defaulter (2010)
- Desert Gold (2008)
- Dundeel (2025)
- Eight Carat (2016)
- Ethereal (2016)
- Eulogy (2010)
- Foxbridge (2008)
- Gloaming (2006)
- Grey Way (2010)
- Horlicks (2010)
- Imperatriz (2025)
- Kindergarten (2006)
- Let's Elope (2021)
- Limerick (2025)
- Mainbrace (2008)
- Melody Belle
- Might and Power (2018)
- Moifaa (2014)
- Mr Tiz (2014)
- Mufhasa (2021)
- Octagonal (2025)
- O'Reilly (2018)
- Phar Lap (2006)
- Redcraze (2012)
- Rising Fast (2008)
- Rough Habit (2012)
- Savabeel (2025)
- Show Gate (2012)
- Sir Tristram (2008)
- So You Think (2016)
- Starcraft (2021)
- Sunbride (2021)
- Sunline (2006)
- Tulloch (2008)
- Veandercross (2018)
- Verry Elleegant (2023)
- Zabeel (2014)

== People ==
- Ken Austin (2023)
- Brian Anderton (2012)
- Murray Baker (2018) – trainer
- Opie Bosson (2023) - jockey
- Bill Broughton (2006) – jockey
- Syd Brown (2014) – trainer
- Ken Browne (2008) – trainer
- Jim Cassidy (2014) – jockey
- Garry Chittick (2016) – breeder
- Sir George Clifford (2006) – owner, administrator
- Rex Cochrane (2014) – trainer
- John Costello (2016) – journalist
- Bart Cummings (2012) – trainer
- Shane Dye (2016) – jockey
- David Ellis (2025)
- Jim Ellis (2012)
- Sir Woolf Fisher (2018)
- Sir James Fletcher (2021) – breeder, owner and racing administrator
- Michael Floyd (2023)
- Jim Gibbs (2012) - trainer
- Tommy George (2021) – trainer
- Sir Stanley Goosman (2025) - owner
- Hector Gray (2008) – jockey
- Noel Harris (2018) – jockey
- Bill Hazlett (2008) – owner and trainer
- Tod Hewitt (2018) – jockey
- Sir Patrick Hogan (2006) – breeder
- Grenville Hughes (2010) – jockey
- Charlie Jenkins (2025) - jockey & trainer
- Colin Jillings (2008) – trainer
- Linda Jones (2010) – jockey
- Peter Kelly (2008) – race caller and auctioneer
- Laurie Laxon (2016) – trainer
- Thomas Lowry (2025) - owner & breeder
- Richard (Dick) John Mason (2006) – trainer
- Maurice McCarten (2014) – trainer
- Granny McDonald (2021) – trainer
- James McDonald (2021) – jockey
- Dr Alex McGregor Grant (2012)
- Michael Moroney (2023) - trainer
- Seton Otway (2016) – breeder
- Dave O’Sullivan (2006) – trainer
- Lance O'Sullivan (2006) – jockey
- Paul O'Sullivan (2023) - trainer
- David Peake (2010) – jockey
- George Price (2023)
- Henry Redwood (2008) – pioneer and owner
- Graeme Rogerson (2012) - trainer
- Bill Sanders (2012)
- Bill Skelton (2006) – jockey
- Bob Skelton (2006) – jockey
- George Stead (2006) – owner
- Brent Thomson (2012) – jockey
- Sir Peter Vela (2021) – breeder, owner and racing administrator
- Ray Verner (2010) – trainer
- Keith Voitre (2023)
- Chris Waller (2018) – trainer
- John Wheeler (2010) – trainer

== See also ==
- New Zealand Horse of the Year
- Thoroughbred racing in New Zealand
- Australian Racing Hall of Fame
- Canadian Horse Racing Hall of Fame
- United States' National Museum of Racing and Hall of Fame
