= Race of the Century (horse racing) =

Australian horse race

The Race of the Century was the name given to a 1986 W. S. Cox Plate, a thoroughbred horse race in held in Melbourne, Australia, between two New Zealand racehorses of the 1980s.

The W. S. Cox Plate, held annually at Melbourne's Moonee Valley Racecourse, is one of the most significant races on the Australian calendar. It considered to be the weight-for-age championship of Australia and New Zealand. The race had been won by some of the great thoroughbreds of Australasian turf since its inception in 1922, including Phar Lap, Tulloch, Kingston Town and Winx.

The race centred on the encounter between Our Waverley Star and Bonecrusher.

Bonecrusher was a New Zealand champion, having won most of the three-year-old classics, including the New Zealand Derby. His form continued in Australia, where he won the Tancred Stakes, the AJC Derby, the Underwood Stakes and the Caulfield Stakes.

In turn, Our Waverley Star had been winning almost all his races in New Zealand in the lead-up to the Cox Plate. He had won their previous encounter on 23 August at Ellerslie in the 1200m Admiralty Handicap when Bonecrusher was third.

The race was run at a good pace, in good weather and track conditions, neither favouring or disadvantaging either horse. Our Waverley Star settled wide, in mid-field, while Bonecrusher - as usual - was towards the back of the field. At the 800 metres mark, Bonecrusher (ridden by Gary Stewart) moved around the field to be immediately shadowed by Our Waverley Star (ridden by Lance O'Sullivan). Quickly, the two horses cleared out from the rest of the field. Race caller Bill Collins questioned whether the horses had gone too early: "Here come the New Zealanders . . . have they gone too early...?".

Our Waverley Star built up a length lead, which was countered by Bonecrusher. As they entered wide into the short home straight at the Moonee Valley Racecourse, Bonecrusher had a slender lead. Quickly, Our Waverley Star gathered in Bonecrusher and it seemed he would pull away, but Bonecrusher fought back down the straight to win by a neck at the post...to which race caller Bill Collins added, "... and Bonecrusher races into equine immortality ..."

The 1986 W. S. Cox Plate is one of the most replayed versions of the race and one of the most remembered horse races in Australia and New Zealand. "This was one of those races where the hype in the lead-up was matched, surpassed even, by the race"

Of note, the 3rd place-getter was The Filbert, another well-performed New Zealand horse who carried 2kg more weight than Bonecrusher and Waverley Star. This gave New Zealand the trifecta in the race.

== Placings ==
Here come the New Zealanders Our Waverley Star and Bonecrusher they've raced to the lead 600 out have they gone too early? Two lengths to Drought running up to third from Society Bay they were followed then by Drawn at the head of the others Dinky Flyer. But Our Waverley Star he got a half-length to Bonecrusher he's gone for the whip on Bonecrusher, three lengths to Drought followed then by Dinky Flyer and Drawn. But the two great New Zealanders have come away on the turn, Our Waverley Star a half-length Bonecrusher the big red won't give in Drought running on, Bonecrusher responds to the whip, the roars of the crowd! He races up to Our Waverley Star a hundred out Bonecrusher, Our Waverley Star stride for stride nothing in it, Our Waverley Star the rails Bonecrusher the outside and Bonecrusher races into equine immortality!

— Commentator Bill Collins describes the climax of the race

Place	Horse	Jockey	Weight	Trainer
1	Bonecrusher	Gary Stewart	57	Frank Ritchie
2	Waverley Star	Lance O'Sullivan	57	Dave O’Sullivan
3	The Filbert	Garry Murphy	59	D N Couchman
4	Dandy Andy	John Marshall	49	C V Cerchi
5	Drought	Darren Gauci	48.5	John Meagher
6	Drawn	Pat Hyland	57	Les Bridge
7	Dinky Flyer	Greg Hall	56.5	K J Walker
8	Tristram	Gary Willetts	49.5	Geoff Murphy
9	Ma Chiquita	Shane Dye	54.5	Neville Begg
10	Abaridy	Gary Doughty	48.5	S Watkins
11	Society Bay	R Stocker (a)	46	G Setchell
12	Roman Artist	M Logue	57	Neville Begg
13	Imprimateur	P Shepherd	48.5	Dr Geoff Chapman

== See also ==
- Thoroughbred racing in Australia
- Thoroughbred racing in New Zealand
