= Grey Way =

New Zealand-bred Thoroughbred racehorse

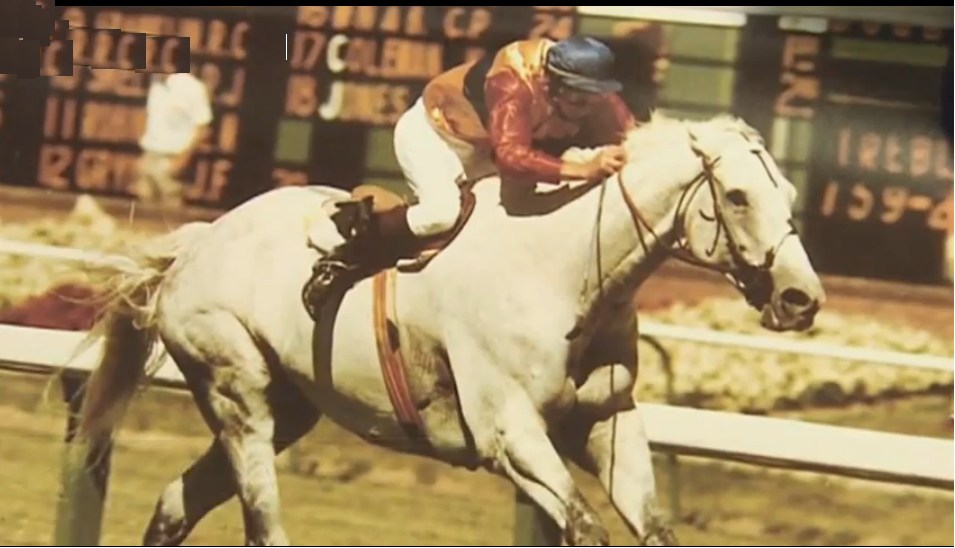
- Sire: Grey William (GB)
- Grandsire: Grey Sovereign (GB)
- Dam: Waybrook (NZ)
- Damsire: Kings Command (GB)
- Sex: Gelding
- Foaled: 1970
- Country: New Zealand
- Colour: Grey
- Breeder: Peter South, South Canterbury
- Owner: Peter South, South Canterbury
- Trainer: Pat Corboy, Washdyke
- Record: 164:51-27-21
- Earnings: $235,020

Major wins
- Chirnside Stakes (1974); Awapuni Gold Cup (1976); WRC George Adams Handicap (1977); Easter Handicap (1977)

Honours
- New Zealand Racing Hall of Fame

Grey Way, the Washdyke Wonder, was a champion New Zealand Thoroughbred racehorse. He was foaled in Washdyke in 1970 near Timaru by Grey William out of Waybrooke who won the 'Broodmare of the Year' title in the 1977–78 season. Another famous racehorse foaled in this area was Phar Lap.

== Achievements ==
He was horse of the year in 1973. He was grey in colour and pure white in the later stages. Grey Way was successful mainly at distances from 6 furlongs to a mile, i.e., a sprinter-miler, but he did win at longer distances. He had a record of 51 wins and 27 seconds and 21 thirds from 164 starts. He raced from 2 to 10 years old, beating nearly every champion that New Zealand had to offer, including Show Gate. He also broke the Australasian record over 7 furlongs as a seven-year-old while carrying 60.5 kg. The rider in many of his races was Robert (Bob) Skelton.

He was the New Zealand equivalent to another great grey, Gunsynd.

Grey Way was inducted into the New Zealand Racing Hall of Fame in 2010.

== Racing career ==
Originally thought of as a jumping prospect, Grey Way won four races as a two-year-old and added seven minor placings. He won a further seven races as a 3yo, also setting a track record for 1400m at Trentham Racecourse.

Early on as a four-year-old, he won two races, including another track record, set at Ashburton. He then went to Victoria, Australia where he struck unsuitable wet tracks, which he detested, but won the Chirnside Stakes at Caulfield in soft conditions. His final start there in the George Adams yielded a close fifth on a firm track, where rider Noel Harris lost his whip. Back in New Zealand, Grey Way ran a number of minor placings and looked awkward on right-handed tracks. He ended the season with three further wins, including a course-record at Riccarton.

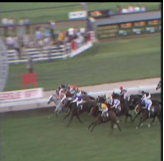
Grey Way winning the 1977 Easter Handicap

As a five-year-old, he won 13 races including the Awapuni Gold Cup over 2000m, where he beat Oopik in track-record time. Other top gallopers he defeated that season included Copper Belt, Kiwi Can, Sind, Black Rod, Ajanta, Blue Blood, and Chrisarda. Going white with age, Grey Way won a number of races as a six-year-old. Among these were the defeat of mare Show Gate in the Stewards Hcp carrying 60 kg. He had several meetings with Copper Belt, and they beat each other on a number of occasions. At Ellerslie, he won the 1977 Easter Hcp over 1600m carrying 60.5 kg. He had a wall of horses in front of him and bulled through for rider Bob Skelton. Behind him were Tudor Light, Vice Regal, Kiwi Can, Verax, Patronize, and Shifnals Pride. His first win right-handed, and the Ellerslie crowd gave him a standing ovation.

Grey Way had lost some of his zip as a 7yo and 8yo. However, he won a South Island sprint under 62.5 kg and set an Australasian record for 1400m clocking 1:21.75 at Trentham, aged 7. More wins brought him up to 45 career victories. At 10, he brought up win numbers 50 and 51, and retired after knocking a leg at Trentham. His coat ended up almost snowy white.

== Racing career ==
Notable performances by Grey Way include the following races.

Placing	Year	Race	Distance (m)	1st	2nd	3rd
1st	21 January 1974	Metropolitan Handicap (Trentham)	1400	Grey Way 49.5	Dee Light 52	Ah Bee 48
1st	16 October 1974	Chirnside Stakes (Caulfield)	1200	Grey Way 57	Coolalinga 58	Aurealis 52
1st	19 November 1975	Levin Cup Stakes (WFA)	1600	Grey Way 58	Sind 56	Black Rod 58
1st	20 December 1975	Manawatu Challenge Stakes	1600	Grey Way 58	Kiwi Can 58	Cream Puff 54
1st	20 March 1976	Awapuni Gold Cup	2000	Grey Way 58	Oopik 58	Prepak 56
1st	6 November 1976	Steward's Handicap (Riccarton)	1200	Grey Way 60	Show Gate 63	The Swagger 49
1st	17 November 1976	Levin Gold Cup Stakes	1600	Grey Way 58	Copper Belt 58	Black Rod 58
1st	18 December 1976	Manawatu Challenge Stakes	1600	Grey Way 58	Copper Belt 58	Master Morgan 58
1st	29 January 1977	George Adams Handicap (Trentham)	1600	Grey Way 56.5	Fraxy 54	Caruba 51
1st	5 March 1977	North Island Challenge Stakes	1600	Grey Way 57.5	Shahbanou	March Legend 57
1st	9 April 1977	Easter Handicap (Ellerslie)	1600	Grey Way 60.5	Vice Regal 52	Kiwi Can 58
1st	27 December 1979	Timaru Cup (Washdyke)	1600	Grey Way 58	Tuis Lass 54	Napiat 58

== See also ==
- Thoroughbred racing in New Zealand
- Youtube video - Grey Way winning the Awapuni Gold Cup
- Youtube video - Grey Way winning the 1977 Easter Handicap
