= Awapuni Gold Cup =

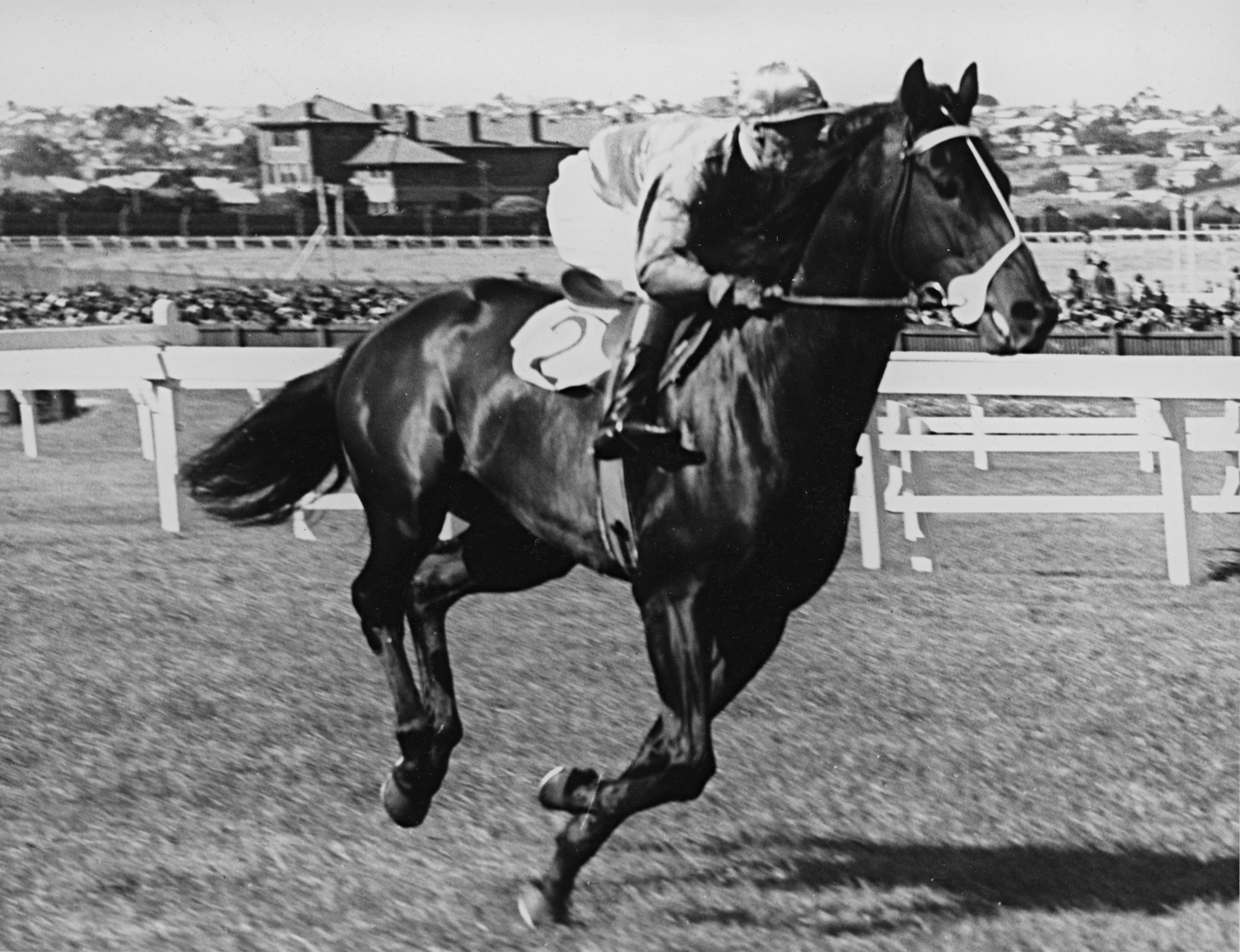
- Beau Vite, 1940 winner
- Class: Group II
- Location: Awapuni Racecourse; Palmerston North, New Zealand
- Inaugurated: 1915
- Race type: Thoroughbred - Flat racing
- Website: www.awapuniracing.co.nz/RACING-INFO.aspx

Race information
- Distance: 2,000 metres (1 1/4 miles)
- Surface: Turf
- Track: left-handed
- Qualification: Three-year-olds and up
- Purse: $200,000 (2026)

The Awapuni Gold Cup is held annually in Palmerston North, New Zealand. It is a set weight and penalties race over 2,000 metres.

== History ==
First held in 1915, the race has been won by many of New Zealand's most famous racehorses including:

- Balmerino
- Desert Gold
- Grey Way
- Horlicks, the 1989 Japan Cup winner
- Kindergarten
- La Mer
- Mainbrace
- Nightmarch
- Redcraze
- Show Gate

Desert Gold and Sir Slick won the race three times.

Desert Gold and La Mer also won the Manawatu Sires Produce Stakes, in 1915 and 1976 respectively, before winning the Awapuni Gold Cup.

== Race results ==
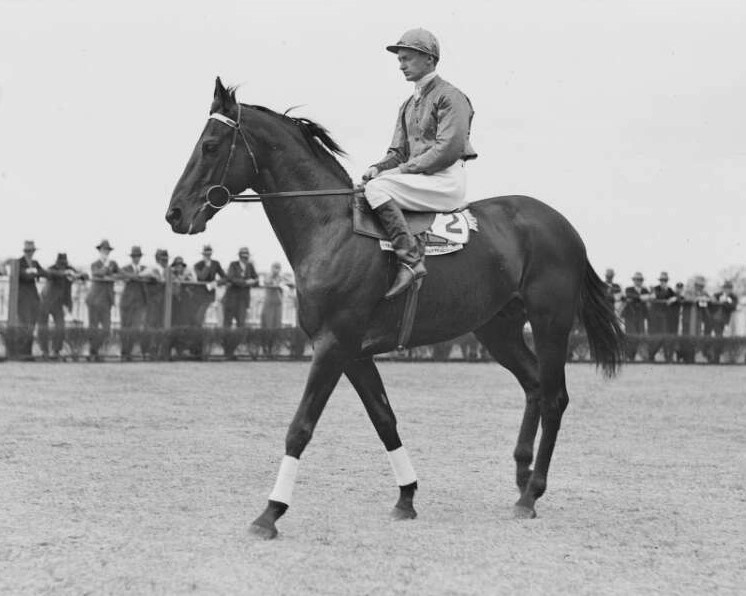
Nightmarch, 1931 &1932 winner.

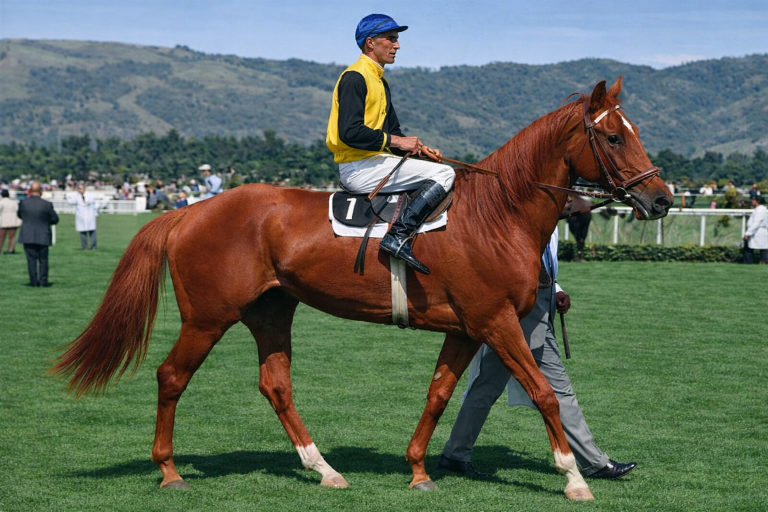
Redcraze, 1955 winner

The following are the winners details and placings in the Awapuni Gold Cup.

There was no race in 2020 due to COVID 19 restrictions. The race was held at Trentham Racecourse in 2024 to 2026 because of track issues at Awapuni.

Year	Winner	Sire	Dam	Jockey	Trainer(s)	Time	Second	Third
2026 (Trentham)	He's A Doozy 55	Zacinto (GB)	The Dewdrop	Kelly Myers	Lisa Latta	2:09.26 (2100m, soft)	Opawa Jack 55	Crouch 55
2025 (Trentham)	Waitak 58	Proisir (AUS)	Repo Bay	Ryan Elliot	Lance O'Sullivan & Andrew Scott	2:09.30 (2100m, soft)	Manifique 53	Town Cryer 55
2024 (Trentham)	Nereus 55	Savabeel	Eudora	Joe Doyle	Shaune Ritchie & Colm Murray, Cambridge	2:11.87 (2100m, soft)	He's A Doozy 58	Skyman 56
2023	Brando 57	Savabeel	Saoirse	Opie Bosson	Mark Walker, Matamata	2:02.65 (soft)	Colorado Star 56	Kelly Coe 53
2022	Zola Express 54.5	Shamexpress	Zolana, by Golan	Chris Dell	Janelle Millar	2:01.99 (good)	Tiptronic 59	Vernanme 57
2021	Beauden 56	Bullbars (AUS)	Belle Femme (AUS)	Ryan Elliot	Team Rogerson, Tuhikaramea	2:07.12 (heavy)	Prise De Fer 57	Callsign Mav 58
2019	Jacksstar 55	Zed (NZ)	Star Guest (NZ)	Chris Johnson	Gary Vile	2:02.03 (good)	Sampson 56	Authentic Paddy 58
2018	Our Abbadean 53	Lookin At Lucky (USA)	Highland Lights (AUS)	Danielle Johnson	Stephen Autridge & Jamie Richards	2:02.97 (soft)	Five To Midnight 56	Sampson 57
2017	Sampson 56	Dubai Destination (USA)	Magic Star (AUS)	Reese Jones	Howie Mathews	2:06.51 (heavy)	Five To Midnight 55	Woodsman 55
2016	Maygrove 57	Authorized (Ire)	Lady Zhivago (NZ)	Matt Cameron	Murray Baker & Andrew Forsman	2:09.68 (heavy)	Trojan Warrior 55	King Kamada 55
2015	Iamishwara 58	Keeninsky	She’s Heroic (NZ)	Lisa Allpress	Antony Kaye	2:04.04 (good)	Jubilate 55	King Krovanh (Aus) 55
2014	Soriano 53.5	Savabeel (AUS)	Call Me Lily (NZ)	Noel Harris	Graeme & Debbie Rogerson	2:05.06 (good)	Military Move 56	Nashville 59
2013	Better Than Ever 58	French Deputy	Songfest	Hayden Tinsley	Jason Bridgman	2:02.43 (good)	Ransomed 56	Spiro 55
2012	Riomoral 55.5	Captain Rio	Immoral	Phillip J Turner (A)	Karen McQuade	2:02.58 (good)	Back In Black 55	Doctor Fremantle 55
2011	Hold It Harvey 57	King Cugat	Daly Charm	Jamie Bullard	Terri Rae	2:02.72 (good)	Dawn Ghost 53.5	Can’t Keeper Down 53
2010	Sir Slick 58	Volksraad	Miss Opera	Samantha Collett	Graeme Nicholson & Paul Allbon	2:01.55 (good)	Manonamission 55	Red Ruler 58
2009	MacO'Reilly 59	O'Reilly	Double Babu	Hayden Tinsley	David Haworth	2:05.01	Sir Slick 59	Spectacular Icon 55
2008	Sir Slick 59	Volksraad	Miss Opera	Bruce Herd	Graeme Nicholson & Paul Albon, Te Aroha	2:03.62	Chettak 59	Butch James 59
2007	Sir Slick 59	Volksraad	Miss Opera	Bruce Herd	Graeme Nicholson	2:01.37	All Square 59	Arabian Nights 56.5
2006	Tusker 56	Volksraad	Stella Artois	David Walsh	Murray Baker	2:02.13	Kerry O’Reilly 58	Distinctly Secret 58
2005	Distinctly Secret 58	Distinctly North	Te Akau Secret	Jamie Bullard	Mark Walker, Matamata	2:02.85	Showgirl 57	Penitentiary 57
2004 (dead heat)	Irish Rover 58	Kenfair	Sterling Lea	David Walker	Eddie Carson	2:02.52	-	Lough Rinn 58
2004 (dead heat)	Distinctly Secret 58	Distinctly North	Te Akau Secret	Opie Bosson	Mark Walker, Matamata	2:02.52	-	Lough Rinn 58
2003	Maze 56	Housebuster (USA)	Strangeways	Gary Grylls		2:04.60	Semper Fidelis 56	Wolf Creek 57
2002	Cent Home 58	Lord Ballina (AUS)	Centuria	David Walker	Jim Wallace, Opaki	2:05.55	Perceptible 58	College Union 56
2001	Cronus 56	Zabeel	Foreign Copy	Vincent Colgan		2:02.19	No Alimony 58	Hero 57
2000	Cruzeiro 57	Kaapstad	Janeiro	J Walker	Geoff Georgetti, Marton	2:03.93	Kingdom Come 58	In My Time 57
1999	Emerald 56.5	Grosvenor	Jennifer Rush	Mark Sweeney		2:00.74	Aerosmith 56	Cruzeiro 58
1998	Magnet Bay	Gold And Ivory (USA)	Rivermist	Peter Johnson	Danny Frye, Rangiora	2:04.29	Sapio 58	Denholm 58
1997	Interval 57	Paris Opera (AUS)	Resolute	Lee Rutherford	Stephen & Trevor McKee, Takanini	2:09.02	Sapio 58	All In Fun 58

== List of other winners ==
- 1915 Chortle
- 1916 Desert Gold
- 1917 Desert Gold
- 1918 Desert Gold
- 1919 Sasanof
- 1920 Amythas
- 1921 Sasanof
- 1922 Marqueteur
- 1923 Thespian
- 1924 Ballymena
- 1925 Suggestion
- 1926 Rapine
- 1927 Commendation
- 1928 Star Stranger
- 1929 Rapier
- 1930 Vertigern
- 1931 Nightmarch
- 1932 Nightmarch
- 1933 Autopay
- 1934 Silver Ring
- 1935 Silver Ring
- 1936 Greek Shepherd
- 1937 Wild Chase
- 1938 Stretto
- 1939 Beaupartir
- 1940 Beau Vite
- 1941 Kindergarten
- 1946 Langue Dor
- 1947 Beau Le Havre
- 1948 Voltaic
- 1949 Lord Mania
- 1950 Beaumaris
- 1951 Mainbrace
- 1952 Hutton
- 1953 Gendarme
- 1954 Golden Tan
- 1955 Redcraze
- 1956 Syntax
- 1957 Berne
- 1958 Bridie
- 1959 Picaroon
- 1960 Picaroon
- 1961 Ilumquh
- 1962 Key
- 1963 Moy
- 1964 Tatua
- 1965 Royal Duty
- 1966 Palisade
- 1967 Terrific
- 1968 Impetus
- 1969 Aquarelle
- 1970 Bardall
- 1971 Game
- 1972 Young Ida
- 1973 Young Ida
- 1974 Show Gate
- 1975 Hi Bing
- 1976 Grey Way
- 1977 Balmerino
- 1978 La Mer
- 1979 Regal Band
- 1980 Serendiper
- 1981 Mun Lee
- 1982 The Twinkle
- 1983 Commissionaire
- 1984 Commissionaire
- 1985 Catiere
- 1986 Abit Leica
- 1987 Lacka Reason
- 1988 Horlicks
- 1989 The Phantom
- 1990 Grey Philae
- 1991 Fun On The Run
- 1992 Seamist
- 1993 Calm Harbour
- 1994 Strategic
- 1995 Kay Row
- 1996 Sapio

== Associated races ==
The Awapuni Gold Cup is currently raced in late March or early April on the same day as the:

- Group 1 Manawatu Sires Produce Stakes over 1400m for 2YO horses.
- Group 3 Manawatu Classic over 2000m for 3YO horses.
- Listed Flying Handicap over 1400m for Open Handicap runners.

Awapuni Racecourse is also the venue for the:

- Listed Marton Cup, an open handicap over 2200m in January.
- Group 3 Manawatu Breeders Stakes over 2000m at weight for age for fillies and mares in April.
- Listed Anzac Mile, open handicap in late April
- Listed Rangitikei Gold Cup, an open handicap over 1600m in May.
- Group 3 Metric Mile, an open handicap over 1550m in September
- Group 3 Eulogy Stakes, in mid-December over 1550m for 3YO fillies.
- Listed Feilding Gold Cup, an open handicap over 2100m in November.
- Group 3 Manawatu Cup, an open handicap over 2200m in December.
- Group 2 Manawatu Challenge Stakes, a Weight For Age race over 1400m in December.

== See also ==
- Thoroughbred racing in New Zealand
- Manawatu Sires Produce Stakes
- Easter Handicap

== Sources ==
Awapuni Gold Cup Winners
