= Kindergarten (horse) =

New Zealand-bred Thoroughbred racehorse

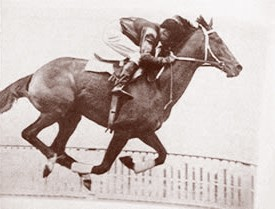
- Sire: Kincardine (GB)
- Grandsire: Gay Crusader
- Dam: Valadore
- Damsire: Valkyrian
- Sex: Rig
- Foaled: 1937
- Country: New Zealand
- Colour: Bay
- Breeder: E. N. Fitzgerald
- Owner: E. N. Fitzgerald
- Trainer: E. N. Fitzgerald
- Record: 35: 25-3-3
- Earnings: £16,080

Major wins
- Awapuni Gold Cup (1941); Wellington Cup (1941); Great Northern Derby (1941); Easter Handicap (1941, 1942); Auckland Cup (1942)

Honours
- New Zealand Racing Hall of Fame (2006)
- Last updated on 16 October 2010

Kindergarten (foaled 1937) was a New Zealand bred Thoroughbred racehorse that raced during the early 1940s. He won many of the premier events in New Zealand including the Wellington Cup and Auckland Cup for more than £16,000 in stake money, which was a large amount during the War.

== Breeding ==
He was a bay colt by the good racehorse and sire, Kincardine (GB), his dam Valadore (by Valkyrian) had 19 starts for two wins. Valadore was the dam of 10 foals, of which 7 were named and raced to produce 5 winners, including a half-brother to Kindergarten, Golden Souvenir. This horse was by Lang Bian (FR) and he was the winner of 10½ races including the Wellington Cup, New Zealand Cup, Dunedin Cup and Canterbury Cup etc.

== Racing record ==
In his one trip to Australia he was allocated a prohibitive weight of 9 stone (57 kilograms), and came third in the 1941 Warwick Stakes to High Caste and Freckles, two great Australian champions. After the race he was unsettled, and rather than risk damage, he was returned to New Zealand.

Three times he was assessed as top weight in the Melbourne Cup, a race in which he would never partake, sometimes at a greater handicap than the mighty Phar Lap.

As a three-year-old, Kindergarten won ten of 13 races, with those ten coming in a row after starting the season with three minor placings. Among his victories as a three-year-old were the Great Northern Derby, Wellington Cup and the first of his two victories in the Easter Handicap, in which he carried 9 st 11 lb, the highest weight ever carried to victory in the race by a three-year-old.

His Auckland Cup victory in 1942 is regarded as his greatest performance. He carried 10 st 2 lb (17 lb over Weight for Age) in a high-quality field and beat them by five lengths in a then track record time of 3 minutes 22 seconds.

Overall he raced 35 times for 25 wins and 6 placings and is regarded by many who saw him race as possibly the greatest horse to have ever raced in New Zealand.

He was one of five inaugural inductees into the New Zealand Racing Hall of Fame, alongside the other four turf immortals Carbine, Gloaming, Phar Lap and Sunline.

== See also ==
- Thoroughbred racing in New Zealand
- List of racehorses
- List of leading Thoroughbred racehorses
