= Bill Broughton =

New Zealand jockey

- Born: William James Broughton; 6 January 1913; Foxton, New Zealand
- Died: 23 September 1990 (aged 77); Palmerston North, New Zealand
- Occupation: Jockey
- Years active: 1928–1958

William James Broughton (6 January 1913 – 23 September 1990) was a New Zealand jockey. He was born in Foxton, New Zealand, on 6 January 1913.

During his career, Broughton rode 1,446 winners in New Zealand, and a further 11 in Australia, including three Wellington Cups and two New Zealand Cups.

He won the jockey premiership for the most winners in a racing season in New Zealand on 11 occasions.

In 1996, Broughton was posthumously inducted into the New Zealand Sports Hall of Fame and in 2006 into the New Zealand Racing Hall of Fame.

== See also ==
- Thoroughbred racing in New Zealand
