= Bob Skelton (jockey) =

New Zealand jockey

Bob Skelton MBE
Personal information
- Full name: Robert James Skelton
- Born: 28 December 1934 Cobden, New Zealand
- Died: 19 August 2016 (aged 81) Melbourne, Victoria, Australia
- Occupation: Jockey

Horse racing career
- Sport: Horse racing
- Career wins: 2129

Major racing wins
- New Zealand Derby (1957, 1961, 1974); Wellington Cup (1959, 1961, 1962, 1963, 1969); New Zealand Cup (1960, 1971, 1977); New Zealand St. Leger (1963, 1974, 1976); New Zealand Oaks (1966); Avondale Cup (1967, 1975); Railway Handicap (1973, 1975); WRC George Adams Handicap (1973, 1977); Ellerslie Sires Produce Stakes (1973); Manawatu Sires Produce Stakes (1973); Auckland Cup (1974, 1977); Melbourne Cup (1976); Easter Handicap (1977); Toorak Handicap (1979); Perth Cup (1980, 1981)

Honours
- New Zealand Racing Hall of Fame (2006); New Zealand Sports Hall of Fame (1995); MBE (1978)

Significant horses
- Grey Way, Van der Hum, Great Sensation Show Gate Star Belle

Robert James Skelton MBE (28 December 1934 – 19 August 2016) was a New Zealand jockey who competed from the 1950s through the 1980s. In total he won 2129 races. Among his many major race wins, Skelton rode Great Sensation to three victories in the Wellington Cup in 1961-63 and won the Auckland Cup on Rose Mellay in 1974 and again in 1977 on Royal Cadenza. In 1976, he rode Van der Hum to victory in Australia's most prestigious race, the Melbourne Cup, and ten years later rode Rising Fear into second place in the 1986 Cup. He was also successful in completing a double in the Perth Cup on Magistrate in 1980 and 1981. Overall winning 20 3200m and two mile races.

In the 1978 Queen's Birthday Honours, Skelton was appointed a Member of the Order of the British Empire, for services to horse racing as a jockey. Overall he won 9 New Zealand Riding Premierships. Including the Melbourne & Perth Cups he also won numerous major races in Australia such as the Toorak Handicap, The George Adams, Feehan Stakes, Turnbull Stakes, and Hotham Handicap, Liston Stakes, Duke of Nortfolk Stakes (3200 m), Memsie Stakes, Easter Cup, and Victoria Handicap.

Skelton retired in the 1987–88 season. He was inducted into the New Zealand Sports Hall of Fame in 1995, and into the New Zealand Racing Hall of Fame in 2006. In 2007 the Auckland Racing Club voted him as their 8th official "Legend of Ellerslie" where he won nine jockey premierships at Ellerslie Racecourse between 1955 and 1976.

Following his riding career he took up training and was fortunate to train and own with friends a little mare (14.2 hands) called Oregon Seal who won 9 races including the Tesio Stakes. After her racing career she became a broodmare and had 8 foals - 8 winners with 3 stakes winners including Oregon Spirit, Talent Show (Perth Cup), and Oregon's Day (Redoutes Choice Stakes, Alexandra Stakes, Frances Tressady Stakes, and the Hollindale Cup.

Skelton died in Melbourne on 19 August 2016.

His brother Bill Skelton was also a successful jockey.

== See also ==
- Thoroughbred racing in New Zealand
