= Lisa Allpress =

New Zealand jockey

Lisa Allpress ONZM
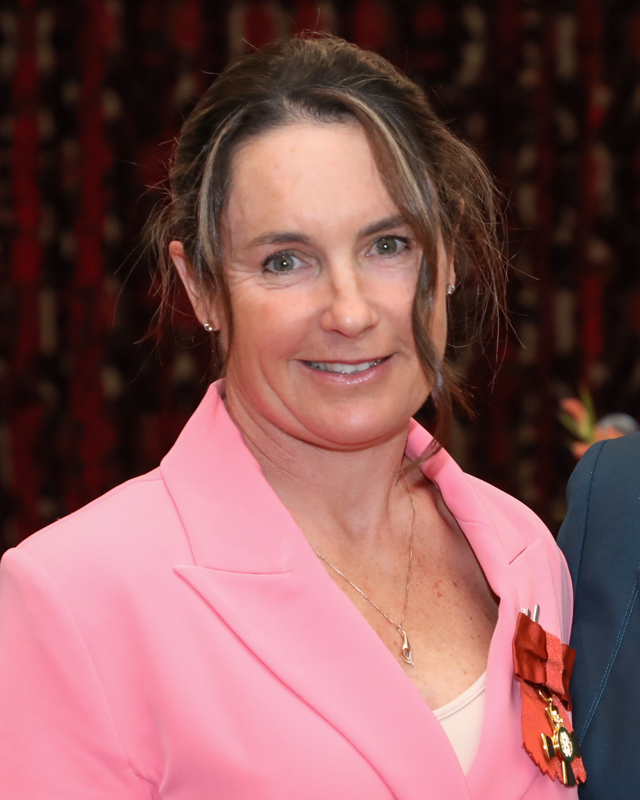
- Allpress in 2021

Personal information
- Full name: Lisa Joy Allpress
- Born: 20 May 1975 (age 51)
- Occupation: Jockey

Horse racing career
- Sport: Horse racing
- Career wins: 1922 (as of May 2024)

Racing awards
- New Zealand jockey premiership (2012, 2016, 2019 and 2020)

Lisa Joy Allpress ONZM (née Mumby; born 20 May 1975) is a New Zealand jockey. She was the first female jockey in New Zealand to reach 1000 wins, and the first to win a race in Saudi Arabia.

Allpress was born on 20 May 1975 in Stratford, New Zealand. She initially aspired to become a veterinarian, but after visiting Japan on a working holiday, where she spectated the 1994 Japan Cup, she started to aspire to become a jockey instead. She was apprenticed to trainer Kevin Gray at Waverley. She debuted in 1996 and scored her first victory in March of that year.

Her first Group Win was on We Can Say It Now in the Captain Cook Stakes at Trentham on 4 December 2010. As of March 2022, Allpress has also ridden successfully in Singapore (57), Japan (12 wins) and Malaysia (12). Her win in Saudi Arabia was the first by a female jockey.

She won her first New Zealand jockey premiership in 2012, achieving the same result again in 2016, 2019 and 2020. In 2013, she became the first female jockey in New Zealand to reach 1000 wins. As of August 2024, she has ridden 1948 winners.

In the 2021 New Year Honours, Allpress was appointed an Officer of the New Zealand Order of Merit, for services to the racing industry.

In August 2024, she suffered a fall after her horse had broken down after crossing the line of a maiden race at Riccarton Park Racecourse. She had broken her vertebra and was transported to Christchurch Hospital, where she underwent surgery to place rods and screws. As a result of the injuries, she was rendered unable to participate in the year's World All Star Jockeys of which she was invited to, which was due to happen later that month at Sapporo Racecourse in Japan.

In December 2024 she returned to race day riding and passed 1950 New Zealand wins. However, in January 2025 she was injured again with her leg broken in three places after her horse reared up prior to a race.

== Personal ==
Allpress married racehorse trainer Karl Allpress in 2002, and they live on a farm at Whanganui with their two sons.
