= 1992 Melbourne Cup =

Edition of the Melbourne Cup

- Melbourne Cup
- Location: Flemington Racecourse
- Date: 3 November 1992
- Distance: 2 miles
- Winning horse: Subzero
- Winning time: 3:24.7
- Jockey: Greg Hall
- Trainer: Lee Freedman
- Surface: Turf

Subzero might be the one he has raced up to Sir Winston, from Cavallieri, Castletown and then Veandercross getting out late from Ali Boy. Greg Hall has raced to the front on Subzero, he goes for home in the Cup and he might have it won, he's three in front. Veandercross, Castletown trying hard. But it's the grey's Cup! Subzero holding Veandercross at bay and Subzero wins the Melbourne Cup by two lengths!

— Commentator Bryan Martin describes the climax of the race

The 1992 Melbourne Cup was a two-mile handicap horse race which took place on Tuesday, 3 November 1992. The race was run over 3,200 metres (1.988 mi), at Flemington Racecourse.

The Cup was won by the 4 year old gelding Subzero. Subzero was trained by Lee Freedman, his second win of five in the Cup after Tawriffic in 1989 and followed by Doriemus (1995) and Makybe Diva (2004 and 2005). It was the only win by Greg Hall in the Melbourne Cup.

After the Australian bred Subzero, the next five placings were New Zealand bred horses including the runner up and race favourite Veandercross and the three time Wellington Cup winner Castletown in third.

Following his retirement, Subzero was employed as the clerk of the course's horse by Graham Salisbury, Racing Victoria's long-time clerk. Subzero died in 2020 at the age of 32, two months after Graham Salisbury.

== Field ==
This is a list of horses which ran in the 1992 Melbourne Cup.

Place	Horse	Trainer	Jockey
1st	Subzero (Aust)	Lee Freedman	Greg Hall
2nd	Veandercross (NZ)	John Wheeler	Shane Dye
3rd	Castletown (NZ)	Paddy Busuttin	Noel Harris
4th	Eurostar (NZ)	Graeme Rogerson	Kevin Moses
5th	Cavallieri (NZ)	Laurie Laxon	Simon Marshall
6th	Sir Winston (NZ)	Dr G Chapman	Patrick Payne
7th	Star Of The Realm (Aus)	John F. Meagher	Steven King
8th	Ali Boy (NZ)	Mark Phillips	R Caddigan
9th	London Bridge (NZ)	Bart Cummings	David Taggart
10th	Big Barron (NZ)	Colin Anderson	Darren Gauci
11th	Aquidity (NZ)	T J Smith	Chris Munce
12th	Better Loosen Up (Aus)	David A. Hayes	Michael Clarke
13th	Val D'Arno (USA)	F W Mitchell	P Johnson
14th	Donegal Mist (NZ)	Graeme Rogerson	Brian York
15th	Super Impose (NZ)	Lee Freedman	Mick Dittman
16th	Te Akau Nick (NZ)	Gai Waterhouse	Larry Cassidy
17th	Sky Flyer (NZ)	B F Deacon	Shane Tronerud
18th	Brave Expectations (Aus)	David A. Hayes	Michael Carson
19th	Dr Grace (NZ)	Dr G Chapman	Larry Olsen
20th	Maharajah (NZ)	T J Smith	Craig Dinn
21st	Heroicity (Aus)	Lee Freedman	Damien Oliver
