= 1987 Melbourne Cup =

Edition of the Melbourne Cup

- Melbourne Cup
- Location: Flemington Racecourse
- Date: 3 Nov 1987
- Distance: 3200m
- Winning horse: Kensei
- Winning time: 3:22.0
- Final odds: 12/1
- Jockey: Larry Olsen
- Trainer: Les Bridge, Randwick
- Surface: Turf

With 400 to go, Agent Provocative fights back it's about a length in front of Beau Trist, Rising Fear's gone, Scarvila's goes out, here comes Rosedale on the outside with Empire Rose there claiming them quickly. Empire Rose's got to the lead, Rosedale tackling it, Kensei got up on the rails, Larry Olsen driving it through. Kensei has run to Empire Rose, Kensei's taken the lead and Kensei won the Cup!

— Commentator Bill Collins describes the climax of the race

The 1987 Melbourne Cup was a handicap horse race which took place on Tuesday, 3 November 1987 over 3200m, at Flemington Racecourse for a stake of $1,285,000.

== Background ==
The race was won by the New Zealand bred gelding Kensei, trained by Les Bridge and ridden by Larry Olsen. The runner up was the big Kiwi mare Empire Rose trained by Laurie Laxon, and third place went to Rosedale trained by Bart Cummings. The winning margin was a half length with a further short half head to third place.

Kensei was bred in New Zealand by D F Duffy & G S Hale. He was sired by Blarney Kiss (USA), who was also the sire of 1983 Melbourne Cup winner Kiwi. His dam was Kitty's Dream (NZ) who was by Nauplius (NZ).

Kensei had previously won a 1800m welter race at Randwick in September, then ran second to The Brotherhood in the Group 2 Newcastle Gold Cup (2300m) and second to Balciano in the Group 1 Metropolitan (2600m) at Randwick. Earlier, in July, he had won the 1987 Grafton Cup over 2200m. He had not previously raced over 3200m Kensei returned to contest the 1988 Cup but was placed 10th.

The runner up Empire Rose had finished 5th in the 1986 Melbourne Cup behind At Talaq. Eleven days later she won the New Zealand Cup at Riccarton and the following year she won the Mackinnon Stakes and 1988 Melbourne Cup.

Kensei's victory was the only Melbourne Cup win for his jockey Larry Olsen or trainer Les Bridge.

=== First woman jockey in the Melbourne Cup ===
Maree Lyndon from New Zealand became the first woman to ride in the Melbourne Cup. Maree was 24 years of age and she finished 20th on Argonaut Style, trained by Tony Cole. In May 1987 she had won the Randwick St Leger (2800m) on Argonaut Style. She later recounted that unlike many other occasions as a pioneering woman jockey she did not have to change in a storage room or tent. A section of the jockeys’ room was sliced off for her to change.

As well as being the first to ride in the Melbourne Cup she was also the first woman to win:

- a New Zealand Group 1, notably the New Zealand Cup (3200m) on Sirtain for Max Northcott, New Plymouth in 1982.
- the Adelaide Cup, on Lord Reims in 1987.
- the Auckland Cup on Miss Stanima for Murray Baker, Woodville in 1990.

It took until 2003 for the first Australian female jockey to ride in the Cup. Clare Lindop rode Debben for Leon Macdonald, finishing 19th behind Makybe Diva. The first woman jockey to win the race was Michelle Payne on Prince Of Penzance in the 2015 Melbourne Cup.

== Field ==
The following are the placegetters in the 1987 Melbourne Cup.

| Place | Horse | Weight (kg) | Trainer | Jockey |
|---|---|---|---|---|
| 1st | Kensei | 51.5 | Les Bridge | Larry Olsen |
| 2nd | Empire Rose | 50.0 | Laurie Laxon | Tony Allan |
| 3rd | Rosedale | 56.0 | Bart Cummings | John Marshall |
