= 1988 Melbourne Cup =

Edition of the Melbourne Cup

- Melbourne Cup
- Location: Flemington Racecourse
- Date: 1 Nov 1988
- Distance: 3200 Meters
- Winning horse: Empire Rose
- Winning time: 3:18.3
- Final odds: 5/1
- Jockey: Tony Allan
- Trainer: Laurie Laxon
- Surface: Turf

Empire Rose has kicked away in the cup from Apollo Run, Na Botto, Natski's flying out wide! Empire Rose in front, Natski's gonna challenge late. Empire Rose a length in front, Natski trying to get to her. Empire Rose a half in front, Natski won't make it and the big mare wins!

— Commentator Bruce McAvaney describes the climax of the race

The 1988 Melbourne Cup was a two-mile handicap horse race which took place on Tuesday, 1 November 1988. The race, run over 3,200 metres (1.988 mi), at Flemington Racecourse.

The race was won by Empire Rose, the popular New Zealand mare who had finished fifth in 1986 when trained by Bart Cummings and second to Kensei the previous year. She did one better in 1988 after winning Mackinnon Stakes she held off 5/1 equal favourite (Empire Rose was also 5/1) Metropolitan Handicap winner Natski in the "Bicentenary" Melbourne Cup Empire Rose became the first mare to win the race since 1965. Empire Rose had previously placed second to Royal Heights in the 1986 New Zealand Oaks and won the 1987 New Zealand Cup. She subsequently placed third in the 1989 W. S. Cox Plate. This would be the last of four Melbourne Cup calls by Bruce McAvaney though his call of this race is considered to be among the best in the race's history.

== Field ==
This is a list of horses which ran in the 1988 Melbourne Cup.

Place	Horse	Trainer	Jockey
1st	Empire Rose	Laurie Laxon	Tony Allan
2nd	Natski	Jack Denham	Mick Dittman
3rd	Na Botto	Richard Otto	Peter Johnson
4th	Apollo Run	Colin Alderson	Alf Matthews
5th	Round The World	Bart Cummings	John Marshall
6th	Banderol	Dave O'Sullivan	Lance O'Sullivan
7th	Ideal Centeman	C Balfour	Michael Clarke
8th	Mr. Bunnythorpe	M Griffin	Barry Griffin
9th	Full At Last	John Sadler	G Murphy
10th	Kensei	Les Bridge	Larry Olsen
11th	Our Classic Boy	M Andrews	David Walsh
12th	Tawrrific	Lee Freedman	S D Marshall
13th	Shantaroun	J Meagher	Greg Hall
14th	Copatonic	Paul Perry	Gary Willetts
15th	Secret Seal	G Shinn	N Willams
16th	Congressman	George Hanlon	Darren Gauci
17th	It's Candide	G Haigh	R N Elliot
18th	Algonquin Club	B Lockwood	Shane Dye
19th	Authaal	Colin Hayes	Brent Thomson
20th	Lord Hybrow	N McBurney	K Moses
21st	Balciano	Neville Voigt	Harry White
22nd	Might	Tommy Smith	Brian York
