= 1989 Melbourne Cup =

Edition of the Melbourne Cup

- Melbourne Cup
- Location: Flemington Racecourse
- Date: 7 Nov 1989
- Distance: 3200m
- Winning horse: Tawriffic
- Winning time: 3:17.1
- Final odds: 30/1
- Jockey: Shane Dye
- Trainer: Lee Freedman
- Surface: Turf

300 to go and Super Impose has hit the front, he's drawn level with Kudz and put his nose in front, Lord Hybrow, Tawriffic run on down the outside. Super Impose in front, Kudz fighting back and Tawriffic coming at them on the outside. Super Impose in front, Kudz, on the outside Tawriffic wears him down, Tawrffic has hit the front, Tawrffic wins the Melbourne Cup by 2 lengths, Super Impose.

— Commentator Greg Miles describes the climax of the race

The 1989 Melbourne Cup was a handicap horse race which took place on Tuesday, 7 November 1989 over 3200m, at Flemington Racecourse.

The race was won by the New Zealand bred stallion Tawriffic, trained by Lee Freedman and ridden by Shane Dye. The runner up was Super Impose also trained by Freedman and third place went to Kudz trained by Colin Hayes. The winning margin was two and a quarter lengths with a further short half head to third place. The winning time of 3:17.1 was a race record, beating the previous year's time set by Empire Rose but was it lowered again in the following year's Cup by Kingston Rule.

== Background ==
Tawriffic was sired by Tawfig and his dam was Joyarty (by Noble Bijou). He did his early racing in New Zealand. Moving to Australia he then won the 1988 South Australian St Leger and 1989 AJC St Leger. After finishing second-last in the 1989 Caulfield Cup he was a 30/1 outsider in the Melbourne Cup. Tawriffic later won the 1989 C B Cox Stakes at Ascot Racecourse (Western Australia).

This win gave Lee Freedman his first Melbourne Cup training win. Lee went on to record five Melbourne Cup victories with Tawriffic, Subzero (1992), Doriemus (1995) and Makybe Diva (2004 and 2005).

It was the only Melbourne Cup win for jockey Shane Dye but he also placed third in the 1986 Melbourne Cup on Sea Legend and was runner up on Shiva's Revenge and Nothin' Leica Dane in the 1991 and 1995 Cups.

== Field ==
The following are the placegetters in the 1989 Melbourne Cup.

Place	Horse	Weight (kg)	Trainer	Jockey
1st	Tawriffic	54	Lee Freedman	Shane Dye
2nd	Super Impose	56	Lee Freedman	Darren Gauci
3rd	Kudz	52.5	Colin Hayes	Michael Clarke
