= Miss Andretti =

Australian-bred Thoroughbred racehorse

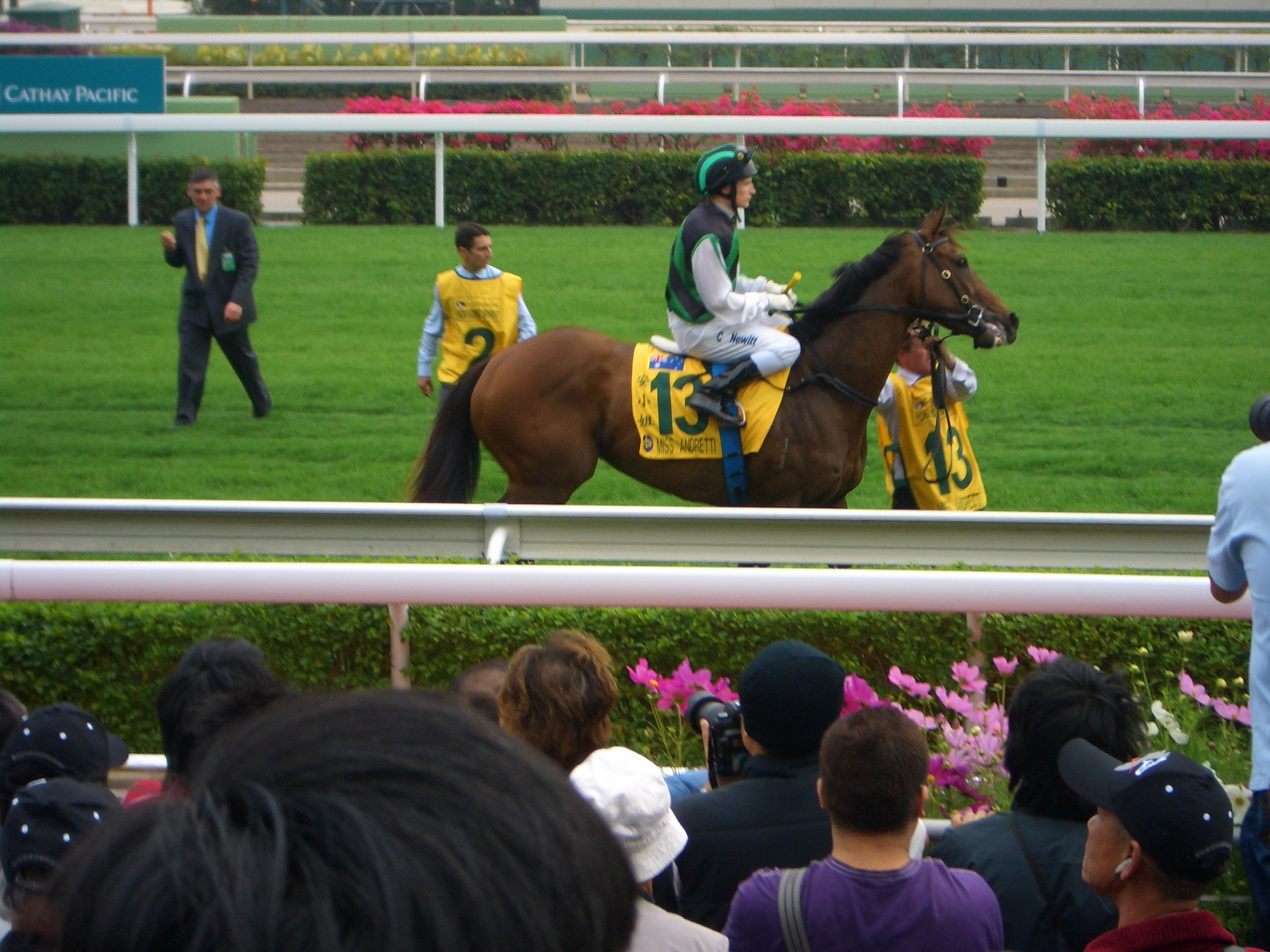
- Miss Andretti in Hong Kong
- Sire: Ihtiram (IRE)
- Grandsire: Royal Academy (USA)
- Dam: Peggie’s Bid
- Damsire: Marooned (GB)
- Sex: Mare
- Foaled: 2001
- Country: Australia
- Colour: Bay or brown
- Breeder: K. Beauglehole & Mrs. P. Beauglehole
- Owner: Sean Buckley & D.B. Mueller & Ms G Guenzi
- Trainer: 1. David Mueller; 2. Lee Freedman
- Record: 31: 19-3-2
- Earnings: A$2,848,991

Major wins
- Winterbottom Stakes (G2) (2005); Prince of Wales Stakes (G3) (2005); Manikato Stakes (G1) (2006); Schillaci Stakes (G2) (2006); Ian McEwen Trophy (G3) (2006); The Age Classic (G1) (2007); Newmarket Handicap (G1) (2007); Australia Stakes (G1) (2007); Lightning Stakes (G1) (2007); Schweppes Stakes (G2) (2007); King's Stand Stakes(G2) (2007)

Awards
- 2007 Australian Horse of the Year; Williams Inglis & Son Champion Sprinter; Sky Channel Most Popular Racehorse

Honours
- Australian Racing Hall of Fame
- Last updated on 4 September 2010

Miss Andretti was the 2007 Australian Champion Racehorse of the Year and is the only Thoroughbred in racing history to simultaneously hold a total of five track records in Australia and England. In 2023, Miss Andretti was inducted into the Australian Racing Hall of Fame.

== Breeding ==
She is a bay or brown mare that was foaled on 12 August 2001 in Western Australia. Miss Andretti was by Ihtiram (IRE) (he had 58 starts for 9 wins, 10 seconds, 5 thirds and $257,379) from Peggie’s Bid by the imported Sydney Cup winner Marooned (GB). Peggie’s Bid has produced seven named foals, but her only other stakes-winner was Danny Beau, by Zedrich who has had 14 starts for 9 wins, 1 second and $436,075. In 2010 Peggie's Bid foaled an unnamed bay or brown half sister to Miss Andretti by the Australian sire, Oratorio.

== Racing career ==
David Mueller selected Miss Andretti from a group of seven weanlings at Ray Cochrane's property. Miss Andretti was originally trained in Western Australia (WA) by David Mueller who had her win nine races in WA, including the G2 WATC Winterbottom Stakes, WATC Prince of Wales Stakes and the WATC Ruabon Stakes, while under his care. Mueller, sold a 75 per cent share in Miss Andretti to Melbourne businessman, Sean Buckley and partner Gabriella Guenzi before she was transferred to trainer Lee Freedman. Her former trainer still continued attending her races, including the trip to England, and collected a percentage of prize money. In Melbourne she won in top company in 10 of her first 13 starts for trainer Lee Freedman.

Amongst her major wins are the following G1 races:

- 2006 Manikato Stakes and Age Classic
- 2007 VRC Lightning Stakes, VRC Newmarket Handicap and MVRC Australia Stakes

Miss Andretti’s other group wins were the 2006 G2 MRC Schillaci Stakes over 1,000 metres, G3 MVRC Ian McEwen Trophy and 2007 G2 Schweppes Stakes over 1,200 m.

On 30 May 2007 Miss Andretti travelled to the United Kingdom winning, and smashing the course record in the 2007 King's Stand Stakes during the Royal Ascot meeting. The winner of the previous year, an Australian horse, Takeover Target finished fourth. After this record win American and European syndicates made offers of up to $10 million for Miss Andretti, but they were rejected.

On 26 Nov 2007 Miss Andretti was taken to Hong Kong after spending two weeks in quarantine in Melbourne, before departure. She started in the G1 Hong Kong International Sprint, which is run in a clockwise direction (the reverse of Melbourne racing), but could only finish tenth. After three weeks in Hong Kong Miss Andretti returned to Australia served another three weeks' quarantine in Melbourne. Freedman believed that future racing plans for Miss Andretti in the first half of 2008 were all but ruined by the quarantine protocols she served as part of racing in Hong Kong.

Miss Andretti was retired from racing on 30 August 2008 after finishing last in a listed race at Caulfield Racecourse.

== Race record ==
2004-05 season as a three-year-old
Result	Date	Race	Venue	Group	Distance	Weight (kg)	Jockey	Winner/2nd
Won	29 Dec 2004	3yo Hcp Restricted Maiden	Pinjarra	NA	1200 m	55	K. Forrester	2nd - Hello Doctor
2nd	26 Jan 2005	3yo Hcp Restricted Fillies	Belmont	NA	1200 m	52.5	K. Forrester	1st - Lust For Dust
Won	12 Feb 2005	3yo Hcp Restricted	Belmont	NA	1200 m	52	K. Forrester	2nd - Key's Ace
Won	27 Feb 2005	3yo Hcp Restricted Fillies & Mares	Pinjarra	NA	1400 m	53.5	K. Forrester	2nd - Blondelle
Won	25 Apr 2005	3yo Hcp Restricted Fillies	Belmont	NA	1000 m	59	K. Forrester	2nd - Final Effect
Won	14 May 2005	3yo Hcp Restricted	Belmont	NA	1200 m	52.5	K. Forrester	2nd - Zed Power
Won	28 May 2005	3yo Hcp Restricted Fillies & Mares	Belmont	NA	1200 m	55.5	K. Forrester	2nd - Eroded
2nd	04 Jun 2005	3yo Hcp Restricted Fillies & Mares	Belmont	NA	1400 m	56	K. Forrester	1st - Lust For Dust

2005-06 season as a four-year-old
Result	Date	Race	Venue	Group	Distance	Weight (kg)	Jockey	Winner/2nd
Won	22 Oct 2005	Bankwest Stakes	Belmont	LR	1200 m	53	K. Forrester	2nd - Rescuer
Won	01 Nov 2005	Winterbottom Stakes	Ascot	G2	1200 m	55	K. Forrester	2nd - Avenida Madero
3rd	12 Nov 2005	Crawford Stakes	Ascot	LR	1100 m	56	K. Forrester	1st - Electric
Won	26 Nov 2005	Prince Of Wales Stakes	Ascot	G3	1200 m	55	K. Forrester	2nd - Star Laser
4th	10 Dec 2005	Colonel Reeves Stakes	Ascot	G3	1200 m	56	P. Hall	1st - Ellicorsam
6th	25 Feb 2006	Oakleigh Plate	Caulfield	G1	1100 m	51.5	K. Forrester	1st - Snitzel
11th	11 Mar 2006	Newmarket Handicap	Flemington	G1	1200 m	51	K. Forrester	1st - Takeover Target
Won	20 May 2006	Straight Six	Flemington	LR	1200 m	56	C. Newitt	2nd - Stratton Place

2006-07 season as a five-year-old
Result	Date	Race	Venue	Group	Distance	Weight (kg)	Jockey	Winner/2nd
Won	26 Aug 2006	Ian McEwen Trophy	Moonee Valley	G3	1000 m	55	C. Newitt	2nd - Sassbee
Won	16 Sep 2006	Manikato Stakes	Moonee Valley	G1	1200 m	55	C. Newitt	2nd - Dance Hero
2nd	23 Sep 2006	Sir Rupert Clarke Stakes	Caulfield	G1	1400 m	53.5	C. Newitt	1st - Rewaaya
Won	14 Oct 2006	Schillaci Stakes	Caulfield	G2	1000 m	55	D. Oliver	2nd - Green Birdie
3rd	04 Nov 2006	Salinger Stakes	Flemington	G1	1200 m	55	C. Newitt	1st - Dance Hero
Won	03 Feb 2007	Lightning Stakes	Moonee Valley	G1	1000 m	56	C. Newitt	2nd - Magnus
Won	17 Feb 2007	Australia Stakes	Moonee Valley	G1	1200 m	56	C. Newitt	2nd - Any Suggestion
Won	10 Mar 2007	Newmarket Handicap	Caulfield	G1	1200 m	56	C. Newitt	2nd - Gold Edition
Won	19 Jun 2007	King's Stand Stakes	Ascot (UK)	G2	1000 m	57.5	C. Newitt	2nd - Dandy Man
15th	23 Jun 2007	Golden Jubilee Stakes	Ascot (UK)	G1	1200 m	57.5	C. Newitt	1st - Soldier's Tale

2007-08 season as a six-year-old
Result	Date	Race	Venue	Group	Distance	Weight (kg)	Jockey	Winner/2nd
Won	27 Oct 2007	Schweppes Stakes	Moonee Valley	G2	1200 m	56	C. Newitt	2nd - Gold Edition
Won	10 Nov 2007	The Age Classic	Flemington	G1	1200 m	56	C. Newitt	2nd - Gold Edition
10th	09 Dec 2007	Hong Kong Sprint	Sha Tin (HK)	G1	1200 m	55.5	C. Newitt	1st - Sacred Kingdom
4th	29 Mar 2008	Robert Sangster Stakes	Morphettville	G1	1200 m	56	C. Newitt	1st - Juste Momente

2008-09 season as a seven-year-old
Result	Date	Race	Venue	Group	Distance	Weight (kg)	Jockey	Winner/2nd
14th	30 Aug 2008	The Heath	Caulfield	LR	1100 m	56.5	D. Dunn	1st - Bel Mer

== Stud record ==
At stud Miss Andretti initially missed (failed to conceive) to matings with Redoute's Choice and Fastnet Rock. On 1 September 2009 she foaled a chestnut colt by Exceed And Excel at Toolooganvale Stud in the Hunter Region. This colt by Exceed And Excel, was sold at the Gold Coast auction for $460,000 to her trainer Lee Freedman. Owner Sean Buckley took back part-ownership of the foal with hall of fame trainer Lee Freedman. The foal named Mr Villineuve, did not reach the race track.

In 2010 she was in foal to Fastnet Rock.

Her best performed progeny has been Mr Hamilton, a stallion by Nicconi born in 2014, who won 3 races and stake money of $61,000 in its career.

== Honours ==
Miss Andretti was awarded the title of Australia’s champion racehorse in 2007 as well as the Williams Inglis & Son Champion Sprinter and the Sky Channel Most Popular Racehorse. She was inducted into the West Australian Racing Industry Hall Of Fame in 2012.

A book on Miss Andretti's career was published in 2011. Princess: The Miss Andretti Story was written by former West Australian Trotting Association commentator John Hunt and published by Random House Books.

== Pedigree ==
Pedigree of Miss Andretti (Aus)
Sire Ihtiram (Ire) 1992	Royal Academy (USA); 1987	Nijinsky (Can); 1967	Northern Dancer (Can)
Sire Ihtiram (Ire) 1992	Royal Academy (USA); 1987	Nijinsky (Can); 1967	Flaming Page (Can)
Sire Ihtiram (Ire) 1992	Royal Academy (USA); 1987	Crimson Saint (USA); 1969	Crimson Satan (USA)
Sire Ihtiram (Ire) 1992	Royal Academy (USA); 1987	Crimson Saint (USA); 1969	Bolero Rose (USA)
Sire Ihtiram (Ire) 1992	Welsh Love (Ire); 1986	Ela-Mana-Mou (Ire); 1976	Pitcairn (Ire)
Sire Ihtiram (Ire) 1992	Welsh Love (Ire); 1986	Ela-Mana-Mou (Ire); 1976	Rose Bertin (GB)
Sire Ihtiram (Ire) 1992	Welsh Love (Ire); 1986	Welsh Flame (GB); 1973	Welsh Pageant (Fr)
Sire Ihtiram (Ire) 1992	Welsh Love (Ire); 1986	Welsh Flame (GB); 1973	Electric Flash (GB)
Dam Peggie's Bid (Aus) 1996	Marooned (GB); 1981	Mill Reef (USA); 1968	Never Bend (USA)
Dam Peggie's Bid (Aus) 1996	Marooned (GB); 1981	Mill Reef (USA); 1968	Milan Mill (USA)
Dam Peggie's Bid (Aus) 1996	Marooned (GB); 1981	Short Rations (GB); 1975	Lorenzaccio (Ire)
Dam Peggie's Bid (Aus) 1996	Marooned (GB); 1981	Short Rations (GB); 1975	Short Commons (Ire)
Dam Peggie's Bid (Aus) 1996	Time to Bid (Aus); 1990	Alytime (USA); 1983	Alydar (USA)
Dam Peggie's Bid (Aus) 1996	Time to Bid (Aus); 1990	Alytime (USA); 1983	Timely Tammy (USA)
Dam Peggie's Bid (Aus) 1996	Time to Bid (Aus); 1990	Without Reserve (Aus); 1983	Haulpak (Aus)
Dam Peggie's Bid (Aus) 1996	Time to Bid (Aus); 1990	Without Reserve (Aus); 1983	Swift Meadows (Aus) (Family: 9-g)
