= Asian Beau Stakes =

Horse race in Perth, Western Australia

- Class: Group 3
- Location: Ascot Racecourse, Perth, Western Australia
- Inaugurated: 1982 (as WATC Kankama Quality Stakes)
- Race type: Thoroughbred

Race information
- Distance: 1,400 metres
- Surface: Turf
- Track: Left-handed
- Qualification: Three year old and older
- Weight: Quality handicap
- Purse: A$200,000 (2026)

The Asian Beau Stakes is a Perth Racing Group 3 Thoroughbred horse race held under quality handicap conditions, for horses aged three years old and upwards, over a distance of 1400 metres at Ascot Racecourse, Perth, Western Australia in late October or early November.

== History ==
=== Name ===
Nitro Lad won the inaugural event which was known as the WATC Kankama Quality Stakes. It was also known as the WATC Belmont Community Quality Stakes, WATC Budget Quality Stakes and the WATC Singapore Quality.

Since 1995 the race has been known as the Asian Beau Stakes, named after the champion sprinter/miler Asian Beau, who raced in the late 1970s and early 1980s, winning 12 of 18 starts including the 1979 Railway Stakes.

=== Venue ===
- In 2003 the race was run at Belmont Park Racecourse.

=== Grade ===
- 1985–1998 - Listed race
- 1999 onwards - Group 3

=== Distance ===
- 1985–1992 – 1200 metres
- 1993 onwards - 1400 metres

=== Double winners ===
Eight horses have completed the Asian Beau–Railway Stakes double:

- Bold Extreme (1996), Willoughby (1998), El Presidente (2007), Lucky Gray (2011), Galaxy Star (2018), Inspirational Girl (2020), Western Empire (2021), and Watch Me Rock (2025).

== Winners ==
The following are past winners of the race.

- 2026 - Hot And High
- 2025 - Watch Me Rock
- 2024 - Super Smink
- 2023 - Marocchino
- 2022 - Treasured Star
- 2021 - Western Empire
- 2020 - Inspirational Girl
- 2019 - Samizdat
- 2018 - Galaxy Star
- 2017 - Pounamu
- 2016 - Heart Starter
- 2015 - Real Love
- 2014 - Balmont Girl
- 2013 - Platinum Rocker
- 2012 - Westriver Kevydonn
- 2011 - Luckygray
- 2010 - Colour Correct
- 2009 - Kasabian
- 2008 - Gilded Venom
- 2007 - El Presidente
- 2006 - Idyllic Prince
- 2005 - Wild Target
- 2004 - Rock Of Cashel
- 2003 - Track Jester
- 2002 - Suspicion
- 2001 - Old Fashion
- 2000 - Fair Alert
- 1999 - Umah
- 1998 - Willoughby
- 1997 - Look Of Success
- 1996 - Bold Extreme
- 1995 - Lynsted Lad
- 1994 - Classy Dresser
- 1993 - Asian Incline
- 1992 - Pago Escort
- 1991 - Future Edition
- 1990 - Crimson Medal
- 1989 - Medicine Kid
- 1988 - Ableson
- 1987 - Power Prince
- 1986 - Fimiston
- 1985 - Coal Pak
- 1984 - Paragon of Virtue
- 1983 - Questilla
- 1982 - Nitro Lad

== See also ==
- Prince of Wales Stakes
- List of Australian Group races
- Group races
