= Rogan Josh (horse) =

Australian-bred Thoroughbred racehorse

- Sire: Old Spice (AUS)
- Grandsire: Kaoru Star (AUS)
- Dam: Eastern Mystique (AUS)
- Damsire: Hammed (NZ)
- Sex: Gelding
- Foaled: 30 September 1992
- Died: 24 June 2022 (aged 29)
- Country: Australia
- Colour: Bay
- Breeder: M.A. Forrest, WA
- Owner: W L Green, J P Miller
- Trainer: Colin Webster; Bart Cummings
- Record: 38:13-6-1
- Earnings: A$2,683,692

Major wins
- 1999 Group 1 Melbourne Cup; 1999 Group 1 Mackinnon Stakes; 1999 Group 2 Herbert Power Stakes; 1998 Group 3 Bunbury Cup; 1998 Listed Pinjarra Cup Highest Timeform Rating (win): 115 Highest Timeform Rating in race: 119
- Last updated on 24 June 2022

Rogan Josh (30 September 1992 − 24 June 2022) was an Australian Thoroughbred racehorse, who won the 1999 Melbourne Cup when ridden by John Marshall for the trainer Bart Cummings.

== Background information ==
Rogan Josh was purchased for $13,000 by owner Wendy Green, after he didn't reach his reserve price at the yearling sales and began his racing career in Western Australia. His first start was at Bunbury as a four-year-old, and after winning 4 of his first 5 starts he headed to Ascot where his final run for the campaign resulted in a fourth placing.

As a five-year-old, and now trained by Colin Webster, Rogan Josh worked through his classes in Perth recording another four wins before heading to the 1998 Pinjarra Cup. Over 2200 metres Rogan Josh passed the post a nose in front to win the Listed Pinjarra Cup and two weeks later recorded a neck win in the Group 3 Bunbury Cup.

Set for the Perth Carnival he was second in the Group 2 C B Cox Stakes at 2400 metres weight-for-age before finishing second to King of Saxony in the Group 2 Perth Cup at 3200 metres. Colin Webster had a strong belief that Rogan Josh was good enough to run in the Melbourne Cup because of his ability to run 3200 metres. After a brief three start autumn campaign which included a second in the 1999 Bunbury Cup (the race he won the year before), Rogan Josh was then transferred to Bart Cummings and a tilt at the 1999 Melbourne Cup. Cummings liked the fact that Rogan Josh was lightly raced even though he was now a seven-year-old.

When Melbourne Cup markets were first released in August 1999 he was a 250/1 chance. His first start for Bart was in the Aurie's Star Handicap - a 1200-metre sprint down the Flemington straight in which he finished 7th. His next start was the Feehan Stakes where he finished 10th, and a fortnight later he finished 7th in the JRA Cup. He then showed some form on Caulfield Guineas Day when ridden by Darren Gauci he won the Group 2 Herbert Power Stakes by two lengths. Ridden by Chris Munce, a week later, he led turning for home before being run down finishing fourth behind Sky Heights in the Caulfield Cup. After his run in the Caulfield Cup, it was obvious that Rogan Josh had staying ability, plus he already had form at 3200 metres with his second in the Perth Cup earlier in the year, and he would be a real threat in the Melbourne Cup - particularly with his weight of 50 kg - his odds shortened to 15/1. Suddenly everyone wanted to know more about Bart's Perth horse.

Once Rogan Josh was assured of a start in the Melbourne Cup, Bart Cummings entered him to run in the Group 1 Mackinnon Stakes on Victoria Derby as his final lead-up race. John Marshall was chosen to ride him and Rogan Josh caused an upset by winning the Mackinnon at odds of 16/1 and producing a career high Timeform rating of 115 and equaling the race record (2:00.3) which was set by Horlicks in the 1989 Mackinnon Stakes. After his Mackinnon win Rogan Josh became 6/1 second favourite for the Melbourne Cup and finished strongly to beat the Godolphin trained Central Park and win the Group 1 Melbourne Cup three days later. The win was Cummings's 11th Melbourne Cup. The Melbourne Cup field included multiple Group 1 winners Tie The Knot, Central Park and Caulfield Cup winner Sky Heights and future Melbourne Cup winner Brew. The race also included Second Coming who ran 7th however he would go in to run 3rd in the 2000 Melbourne Cup (won by Brew). Rogan Josh only had one more start in Australia: seventh in the Sandown Classic 11 days after the Melbourne Cup before finishing a brave fifth in the Hong Kong Vase at Sha Tin Racecourse (Group 1 2400m WFA) in December 1999, and it was in this race that he produced a career high Timeform rating of 119 for his effort.

He was retired after breaking down during training in the autumn of 2000.

He will always be remembered as a country galloper who took on the best weight-for-age and handicap horses in the eastern states and succeeded. He was the third Western Australian horse to win the Melbourne Cup, following on from Blue Spec (1905) and Black Knight (1984). Of his 38 career races he had 19 starts at Group/Listed level for five wins, two seconds and two-thirds.

In 2006 Rogan Josh was moved to the Living Legends Retirement Park where he could spend the rest of his days with other retired high-profile Group 1 winning racehorses.

On Friday June 24, 2022, Rogan Josh was euthanized due to colic related complications. He was 29 years old and only three months away from reaching 30 years old. He was the last remaining Melbourne Cup winner of the 20th century.
