= 1999 Melbourne Cup =

- Melbourne Cup
- Location: Flemington Racecourse; Melbourne, Australia
- Date: 2 November 1999
- Distance: 3,200 metres
- Winning horse: Rogan Josh
- Jockey: John Marshall
- Trainer: Bart Cummings
- Surface: Grass
- Attendance: 104,028

The Warrior and Central Park with Zazabelle on the outside and Rogan Josh, Travelmate's trying to get into the clear and so is The Hind, it's tight there. Rogan Josh with Central Park and The Warrior the three leaders from Zazabelle on the outside. It's Central Park, The Warrior and Rogan Josh, Rogan Josh and Central Park, Rogan Josh Bart did it again!

— Commentator Greg Miles describes the climax of the race

The 1999 Melbourne Cup was the 139th running of the Melbourne Cup, a prestigious Australian Thoroughbred horse race. The race, run over 3,200 metres (1.988 mi), was held on Tuesday, 2 November 1999 at Melbourne's Flemington Racecourse.

The race won by Rogan Josh, trained by Bart Cummings and ridden by John Marshall.

== Field ==
This is a list of horses which ran in the 1999 Melbourne Cup.

Place	Number	Horse	Trainer	Jockey
1st	17	Rogan Josh	Bart Cummings	John Marshall
2nd	2	Central Park (IRE)	Saeed bin Suroor (UAE)	Frankie Dettori
=3rd	12	Lahar	Paul Cave	Corey Brown
=3rd	24	Zazabelle (NZ)	Bart Cummings	Eddie Wilkinson
5th	8	Travelmate (GB)	James Fanshawe (GB)	David Harrison
6th	22	The Warrior (NZ)	Richard Otto (NZ)	Gary Grylls
7th	13	Second Coming (NZ)	Michael Moroney (NZ)	Greg Childs
8th	7	The Hind (NZ)	Peter Hayes	Jim Cassidy
9th	15	Bohemiath	John Sadler	Jason Patton
10th	19	Brew (NZ)	Michael Moroney (NZ)	Lance O'Sullivan
11th	23	Zabuan (NZ)	Jim Moloney	Sam Hyland
12th	6	Yavana's Pace (IRE)	Mark Johnston (GB)	Richard Hughes
13th	11	Streak	Robert Smerdon	Greg Hall
14th	1	Tie the Knot	Guy Walter	Shane Dye
15th	16	Figurehead (NZ)	Kay Lane (NZ)	Opie Bosson
16th	9	Skybeau (NZ)	Len Smith	Larry Cassidy
17th	3	Sky Heights (NZ)	Colin Alderson	Damien Oliver
18th	20	Lady Elsie	Cliff Brown	Lenny Beasley
19th	18	Laebeel (NZ)	John Sadler	Stephen Baster
20th	4	Maridpour (IRE)	Michael Moroney (NZ)	Steven Arnold
21st	10	The Message (NZ)	John Ralph (NZ)	Aaron Spiteri
22nd	5	Arena	John Hawkes	Darren Gauci
Last	21	Rebbor (NZ)	Bart Cummings	Chris Munce
LR	14	Able Master (NZ)	Bruce Wallace (NZ)	Grant Cooksley
