= Prince of Wales Stakes (Australia) =

Horse race in Perth, Western Australia

- Class: Group 3
- Location: Ascot Racecourse
- Inaugurated: 1969
- Race type: Thoroughbred
- Sponsor: TABtouch (2018-26)

Race information
- Distance: 1,000 metres
- Surface: Turf
- Track: Left-handed
- Qualification: Three year old and older
- Weight: Weight for Age
- Purse: A$200,000 (2026)

The Prince Of Wales Stakes is a Perth Racing Group 3 Thoroughbred horse race held under weight for age conditions, for horses aged three years old and upwards, over a distance of 1000 metres at Ascot Racecourse, Perth, Western Australia in early November.

== History ==
Prior to 1997 the race was scheduled on Melbourne Cup Day. The race was moved for a period to early December. In 2003 the race was run at Belmont Park Racecourse.

=== Grade ===
- 1969–1978 - Principal race
- 1979 onwards - Group 3

=== Distance ===
- 1969–1972 - 6 furlongs (~1200 metres)
- 1973–2015 – 1200 metres
- 2016 onwards - 1000 metres

== Winners ==
The following are past winners of the race.

- 2026 - Talkanco
- 2025 - Jokers Grin
- 2024 - Bravo Centurion
- 2023 - Snowdome
- 2022 - Miss Conteki
- 2021 - Elite Street
- 2020 - Valour Road
- 2019 - Flirtini
- 2018 - Dainty Tess
- 2017 - Dainty Tess
- 2016 - Rock Magic
- 2015 - Akhedasset
- 2014 - Elite Belle
- 2013 - Barakey
- 2012 - Power Princess
- 2011 - Waratah's Secret
- 2010 - Waratah's Secret
- 2009 - Idyllic Prince
- 2008 - Dark Target
- 2007 - Idyllic Prince
- 2006 - Real Mak
- 2005 - Miss Andretti
- 2004 - Golden Delicious
- 2003 - Kaprats
- 2002 - Tribula
- 2001 - Secret Remedy
- 2000 - Secret Remedy
- 1999 - Corporate Gun
- 1998 - Double Blue
- 1997 - Willoughby
- 1996 - Century Blazer
- 1995 - Century Blazer
- 1994 - Jacks Or Better
- 1993 - Daring Hombre
- 1992 - Pago's King
- 1991 - M'Lady's Jewel
- 1990 - Mister Till
- 1989 - Carry A Smile
- 1988 - Fimiston
- 1987 - Ossie Park
- 1986 - Concrete
- 1985 - Casshoney
- 1984 - Heron Bridge
- 1983 - Argentine Gold
- 1982 - I'm On Clover
- 1981 - Latin Saint
- 1980 - Golden Heights
- 1979 - Asian Beau
- 1978 - Junction Girl
- 1977 - Burgess Queen
- 1976 - Belinda's Star
- 1975 - Belinda's Star
- 1974 - Pocket Trim
- 1973 - Starglow
- 1972 - Solid Gold
- 1971 - Heliolight
- 1970 - Red Crescent
- 1969 - Sherolythe

== See also ==
- Asian Beau Stakes
- List of Australian Group races
- Group races
