= Craig Newitt =

Australian jockey

- Born: 1985 (age 40–41); Tasmania, Australia
- Occupation: Jockey
- Years active: 2000–present
- Known for: Riding career in Victoria and Tasmania
- Notable work: Winner of multiple Group One races
- Spouse: Breaana Smith
- Children: 5

Craig Robert Newitt (born 1985) is an Australian jockey who rides mostly in Victoria.

== Biography ==
Newitt was born in Tasmania, the son of two jockeys. He began his career in 2000, and moved to Victoria to finish his apprenticeship with Lee Freedman. His first Group One winner was Perfect Promise in the 2006 C F Orr Stakes. As of early March 2026, he has ridden 2,463 winners, including 34 in Group One races. Five of his Group One wins were on Miss Andretti between May 2006 and March 2008. He also won four Group Ones on Lankan Rupee. He continues to ride in Tasmania, where he has won a record seven Devonport Cups. In March 2026 he became the first jockey to win the Group One Newmarket Handicap four times.

== Personal life ==
Newitt has four sons from his first marriage. He married for a second time to Breaana Smith in January 2025, and they raise the boys together, along with one son of their own.
