= Empire Rose =

New Zealand-bred Thoroughbred racehorse

- Sire: Sir Tristram
- Grandsire: Sir Ivor
- Dam: Summer Fleur
- Damsire: Sovereign Edition
- Sex: Mare
- Foaled: 1982
- Country: New Zealand
- Colour: Chestnut
- Owner: Fred Bodle et al.
- Trainer: Laurie Laxon

Major wins
- New Zealand Cup (1987); Mackinnon Stakes (1988); Melbourne Cup (1988); Trentham Stakes (1989)

Honours
- Empire Rose Stakes

Empire Rose (1982–2002) was one of the most popular Thoroughbred mares to race in New Zealand and Australia. She was a gigantic chestnut, only just fitting into the barrier stalls in Melbourne.

Trained by Laurie Laxon, one of New Zealand's foremost trainers, at the Laurie Laxon Racing Stables at Cambridge, New Zealand, Empire Rose raced 48 times for nine wins and eight placings for NZ$2,644,234 (A$1.95 million). Among her major successes were the 1987 New Zealand Cup, the 1988 LKS Mackinnon Stakes, the 1988 Melbourne Cup and the 1989 Trentham Stakes.

Empire Rose was by the champion New Zealand sire, Sir Tristram (IRE), from Summer Fleur by Sovereign Edition (IRE), and was expected to perform well like other Sir Tristram progeny.

She showed promise when fifth in the 1986 Melbourne Cup behind At Talaq, one place behind former winner Kiwi.

In the 1987 Melbourne Cup she was second to the fellow New Zealand bred Kensei in a bumpy finish and eleven days later she won the 3200m New Zealand Cup at Riccarton Park Racecourse.

The following year Empire Rose won the Mackinnon Stakes on Saturday 29 October, then made her third attempt at the “Race that stops two nations” in the 1988 Melbourne Cup on the following Tuesday, November the 1st. Young rider Tony Allan had the mare handily placed all the way and she led the big field around the home turn. Despite a flashing finish from Natski, Empire Rose refused to give in, winning by a short head on the line. Natski's rump was actually ahead of hers, highlighting her large size. She was given a rousing reception for her win, given it was the first time a mare had won the race in 23 years - the last being the New Zealander Light Fingers.

In 1989 Empire Rose won the Trentham Stakes. Later that year as a seven-year-old, Empire Rose finished 3rd in the Cox Plate behind Almaarad and Stylish Century followed by a 5th in the Mackinnon Stakes behind Horlicks. She then started favourite but struggled to 15th in the 1989 Melbourne Cup won by Tawrrific, and was retired to stud.

On 12 March 2002 Empire Rose was euthanized at her birthplace and home, Whakanui Stud, in Hamilton, New Zealand, due to deteriorating health and an incurable foot problem.

During her racing career, Empire Rose was often ridden in training work by Sheila Laxon, the then wife of trainer Laurie Laxon. Sheila Laxon went on to become a successful licensed trainer in her own right, training Ethereal to win the 2001 Caulfield Cup-Melbourne Cup double and she co-trained Knight's Choice, winner of the 2024 Melbourne Cup.

== See also ==
- Thoroughbred racing in New Zealand
