= Pinjarra Park =

Horse racing venue in Pinjarra, Western Australia

Coordinates: 32.632°S 115.888°E

- Interactive map of Pinjarra Park
- Location: Pinjarra, Western Australia
- Operated by: Pinjarra Race Club
- Date opened: 1891
- Notable races: Pinjarra Cup; Pinjarra Classic; Mandurah Cup

Pinjarra Park is a Thoroughbred horse racing venue located in the town of Pinjarra, Western Australia, about 86 kilometres (53 miles) south of the state capital, Perth. Racing at Pinjarra typically takes place between December and August. The racecourse has a circumference of 1837 metres, and is the only track in Western Australia with a straight 1000-metre chute, ideal for straight races.

== History ==
Racing at Pinjarra Park dates back to the late 19th century, with the first horse race taking place in 1891. The feature race is the Listed $150,000 Pinjarra Cup, held over 2300 metres in late March. Notable winners of the cup include Rogan Josh and Casino Seventeen. Other notable races at Pinjarra include the Listed Pinjarra Classic, the Mandurah Cup and the Magic Millions 3YO Trophy. It serves as a major venue for Perth Racing during the winter off-season, along with Belmont Park Racecourse.

The venue held the 2025 editions of the Strickland Stakes, the Belmont Sprint, and the Hyperion Stakes, due to issues with the turf at Belmont Park Racecourse.

== Facilities ==
In 2005, a major redevelopment of Pinjarra Racecourse was approved by then-Racing and Gaming Minister Mark McGowan. The upgrades included extensions to the jockeys' and stewards' rooms, and an improved drainage system for the main race track.

In addition to Pinjarra Park, the racecourse also includes the Pinjarra Scarpside, an extension which connects to the original track. The venue offers a variety of hospitality options, including bars, restaurants, a members' lounge and a grandstand.

== See also ==
- Ascot Racecourse
- Belmont Park Racecourse
