= Trentham Stakes =

New Zealand thoroughbred horse race

The Trentham Stakes is a Group 3 weight-for-age race held for thoroughbred racehorses at Trentham Racecourse near Wellington, New Zealand conducted by the Wellington Racing Club.

Held over 2100 metres in January, it is seen as the main lead-up race to the Wellington Cup, which is run the following week.

== History ==
The race was changed:

- from a 2400m journey to 2100m in 2009, and
- from Weight for Age to set weight & penalties in 2012.

The 1989 race was named in the January 31 'Upper Hutt Leader' as the Mobil Wellington Stakes, and was won by the Melbourne Cup winning mare Empire Rose.

The scheduling of the races during the Wellington Cup carnival has changed over the years. The 2020 edition (stake of $70,000) was on the same date as the $225,000 Group 1 Levin Classic and the $70,000 Group 3 Anniversary Handicap. The 2026 edition ($150,000) shared the race card with the $200,000 Desert Gold Stakes and $500,000 Group 2 Thorndon Mile.

== Recent winners ==
Year	Winner	Jockey	Trainer(s)	Owner(s)	Time	Second	Third
2026	Rosso 55	Daniel Stackhouse	Michael & Matthew Pitman	S.I.R.E Syndicate	2:13.48 (soft)	Royal Flower 53	One Bold Cat 58
2025	Whangaehu 55.5	Craig Grylls	Bill Thurlow	Fiona J & Humphrey T O'Leary	2:14.14 (good)	Opawa Jack 55	Drop Of Something 55
2024	Times Ticking 57	Joe Doyle	Alby MacGregor	A R, D R and M T MacGregor	2:08.78 (good)	Sagunto 57	Waisake 55
2023	Ladies Man 55	Craig Grylls	Alan Sharrock	F J & H T O'Leary, L L & M J O'Leary, S A Sharrock, S L & N H Stanley, K M & R T Stanley	2:09.29 (good)	Sagunto 56	Waisake 56
2022	Waisake 56	Craig Grylls	Allan Sharrock	L R Butler, Mrs J M & K A Horner, Mrs A & N J Maindonald, B & Mrs E Menzies, P V Mullin, B C & Mrs M C Schumacher & S A Sharrock	2:11.74 (good)	House Of Cartier 54	Mohaka 53.5
2021	Our Hail Mary 53	Danielle Johnson	Allan Sharrock	Sir Patrick Hogan & Lady Hogan	2:11.86 (good)	Fiscal Fantasy 55	Dr Velocious 55
2020	Camino Rocoso 55	Chris Johnson	John & Karen Parsons, Balcairn	J W Bradshaw, G P Coffer, A R Cookson, G N Glogoski et al.	2:09.05 (good)	Fiscal Fantasy 55	Masetto 55
2019	Consensus 53	Chris Johnson	Stephen McKee	T Gibbens, S Lamond, DP & MDJ Molloy, Dame Julie Christie & Est Late MC Molloy	2:10.77 (good)	Hank Moody 55	Chance To Dance 56
2018	Von Tunzelman 55.5	Leith Innes	Roger James	Brendan Lindsay & Jo Lindsay	2:09.55	Devise 53	Benzini 55
2017	Sampson 55	Reece Jones	Howie Mathews	Mrs LA Mathews & Mrs JL Street	2:09.02	Authentic Paddy 56	Promise To Reign 53
2016	Nashville 55	Rosie Myers	Adrian & Harry Bull	A M & Mrs R E Bull	2:12.80	Bell Sorriso 53	Show The World 55
2015	Perfect Start 54	Danielle Johnson	Wayne Hills	G & Mrs S Bluett & JF Marks	2:10.06	Decorah 53	Delveen 53
2014	Alpine Heights 55	Chris Johnson	John & Karen Parsons	PG Lyon	2:10.88	Dancing Attendance 53	Mapmaker 53
2013	O'Fille 53	Noel Harris	Wayne Marshment	SF Meredith, CG Waaka & JH Work	2:11.88	Spiro 55	Inferno 54
2012	Six O'Clock News 56	Nash Rawiller	Trent Busuttin & Natalie Young, Cambridge	Six O'Clock News Syndicate	2:09.53	Roi d'jeu 56	Hold It Harvey 58
2011	Veloce Bella 57	James McDonald (A)	Mark Brosnan	Case Lot Syndicate	2:11.89	Mill Duckie 57	Arakti 52
2010	Red Ruler 59	Mark Du Plessis	John Sargent	RJ Arculli, AR Meehan & GB Sargent	2:12.42	Stand Tall 59	Hurrah 59
2009	Court Ruler 52	James McDonald (A)	John Wheeler, New Plymouth	SJ Pellegrino, BG Taylor & JR Wheeler	2:08.84 (2100m)	O'Reilly Rose 57	Heza karma Kazi 52
2008	Xcellent 59	Michael Coleman	Mike & Paul Moroney	GW Breingan, GKV Holdings Ltd, MJ Gatt, PA Heath, DA Nicholson & Wgtn Racing Syndicate	2:28.02 (2400m)	Three Chimneys 59	Everswindell 56.5
2007	Envoy 59	Grant Cooksley	Ken Kelso	Beverley & Ken Kelso, Mrs J & R E White	2:34.71	Kerry O’Reilly 59	Willy Smith 59
2006	Envoy 59	Grant Cooksley	Ken Kelso	Beverley & Ken Kelso, Mrs J & R E White	2:28.30	Trebla 59	Zabeat 59
2005	Ebony Honour 59	Lisa Cropp	Stephen J & Trevor McKee	Mrs J M & M T Harriman	2:29.18	Justine Coup 55.5	Cluden Creek 59
2004	Semper Fidelis 57.5	Tony Allan	Mark Oulaghan	M K & P M Oulaghan	2:33.94	Quick Lip 57.5	Bel Air 59
2003	Wolf Creek 59	Andrew Calder	S Mitchell	J E & M P Plimmer Family Trusts	2:27.33	Sursum Corda 59	Greene Street 56
2002	Blanchard 57.5	Noel Harris	Graeme Rogerson & Keith W Hawtin	Graeme Rogerson & Windsor Park Stud	2:29.75	Beaujolais 58	Soldier Blue 58
2001	Smiling Like 57.5	Noel Harris	Graeme Rogerson & Keith W Hawtin	Sir Patrick Hogan & Lady Hogan	2:27.45	Reign Supreme 58	Cronus 59
2000	Aerosmith 59	Greg Childs	Peter J & Mrs Nikki Hurdle, Awapuni	A B & D G Smith	2:27.91	Honourable 57.5	Starilyte 59
1999	Del Coronado 59	Paul Taylor	Colin Jillings & Richard Yuill	B G Neville-White & P J Walker	2:29.17	Richmond Dancer 59	All In Fun 58
1998	Aerosmith 59	Greg Childs	Peter J & Mrs Nikki Hurdle	A B & D G Smith	2:29.19	Magnet Bay 59	Gypsy Soul 59
1997	Interval 57	Lee Rutherford	Stephen J & Trevor McKee	T A Green, Mrs H M Lusty & Trevor McKee	2:25.52	Sapio 59	Lord Majestic 59
1996	Silver Chalice 57.5	Shane Udy	RW Bothwell	Mrs J E & R J Bothwell, Mrs J A & W J Stewart	2:27.81	Sapio 58	Happy Warrior 59
1995	Via Suez 57	Gary Grylls	CJ & Mrs CL Wood	Mrs E M & R E R Hipwood	2:27.82	All In Fun 59	Shendare 57.5
1994	All In Fun 57	Jim Collett	TJ McDonald	E T, M O, P J & T J McDonald	2:33.38	Bart's Best 59	Newbury Star 59
1993	Castletown 59	Noel Harris	Patrick Bussuttin	P M Busuttin, B J McCahill & K P Morris	2:29.34	Tall Emperor 59	Beowulf 57
1992	Castletown 59	Noel Harris	Patrick Bussuttin	P M Busuttin, B J McCahill & K P Morris	2:32.05	Carlton King 59	Embroidered 57.5
1991	Castletown 57	Roy McKay	Patrick Bussuttin	P M Busuttin, B J McCahill & K P Morris	2:29.99	Shuzohra 57.5	Madame Bardot 56.5
1990	Flyin Luskin 59	Peter Johnson	Trevor McKee	Joe Karam, Trevor McKee, P J Walker & J A Wells	2:29.38	Lord Mellay 57	Secret Sound 55.5
1989	Empire Rose 57.5	Tony Allan	Laurie Laxon	F P Bodle & Whakanui Stud	2:27.92	Dark Moments 57.5	Argonaut Style 59

=== Winners of both the Trentham Stakes and Wellington Cup ===
- 2012 Six O’Clock News
- 2010 Red Ruler
- 2006 Envoy. He also won the 2007 Trentham Stakes but placed 4th in the Wellington Cup
- 2001 Smiling Like
- 1998 Aerosmith
- 1991 & 1992 Castletown. He also won the 1993 Trentham Stakes and 1994 Wellington Cup
- 1990 Flying Luskin
- 1988 Daria's Fun
- 1974 Battle Heights
- 1970 Il Tempo

The 2021 Wellington Cup winner, Waisake, won the 2022 Trentham Stakes and was 3rd in the 2023 and 2024 editions.

The 1979 Wellington Cup winner, Big Gamble, won the 1981 Trentham Stakes.

In 1977 Show Gate won the Trentham Stakes and was second in the Wellington Cup behind Good Lord.

== See also ==
- Desert Gold Stakes
- Levin Classic
- Mufhasa Classic (formerly the Captain Cook Stakes)
- Telegraph Handicap
- Thorndon Mile
- Recent winners of major Wellington and other New Zealand races
