= Hyperion Stakes =

- Class: Group 3
- Location: Belmont Park Racecourse, Perth, Western Australia
- Inaugurated: 1972
- Race type: Thoroughbred
- Sponsor: PKF Perth (2025 & 2026)

Race information
- Distance: 1,600 metres
- Surface: Turf
- Track: Belmont Park, previously Ascot, Perth
- Weight: Weight for Age
- Purse: $200,000 (2026)

The Hyperion Stakes is a Perth Racing Group 3 Thoroughbred horse race held under Weight for Age conditions, over a distance of 1600 metres at Belmont Park Racecourse, Perth, Western Australia in June.

== History ==
=== Distance ===
- 1972 - 5 furlongs (~1000 metres)
- 1973 - 1000 metres
- 1974 - 1200 metres
- 1975–1978 - 1400 metres
- 1979 - 1450 metres
- 1980–1982 - 1400 metres
- 1983 - 1500 metres
- 1984–2010 - 1400 metres
- 2011 onwards - 1600 metres

=== Venue ===
The race was initially held in March at Ascot Racecourse. In 2011 when the race was moved to Belmont Park it was held in June.

- 1972–2004 - Ascot Racecourse
- 2005 - Belmont Park
- 2006–2010 - Ascot Racecourse
- 2011–2024 - Belmont Park
- 2025 - Pinjarra Park

== Winners ==
The following are past winners of the race.

- 2026 - Western Empire
- 2025 - Western Empire
- 2024 - Magnificent Andy
- 2023 - Startrade
- 2022 - Kaptain Kaos
- 2021 - Valour Road
- 2020 - Perfect Jewel
- 2019 - Gatting
- 2018 - Material Man
- 2017 - Scales Of Justice
- 2016 - Wink And A Nod
- 2015 - Fuchsia Bandana
- 2014 - Elite Belle
- 2013 - Black Tycoon
- 2012 - Luckygray
- 2011 - King Kool Kat
- 2010 - Marasco
- 2009 - Tarzi
- 2008 - Marasco
- 2007 - No Questions
- 2006 - Local Legend
- 2005 - †Amber's Halo / Lakeside Rhythm
- 2004 - Dedicated Miss
- 2003 - Tribula
- 2002 - Old Fashion
- 2001 - Country Blazer
- 2000 - Devilish Dealer
- 1999 - Star System
- 1998 - Willoughby
- 1997 - Bar Dreamer
- 1996 - Island Morn
- 1995 - Jacks Or Better
- 1994 - Brave Kite
- 1993 - Craft Memory
- 1992 - Jungle Hero
- 1991 - Barrosa Boy
- 1990 - Medicine Kid
- 1989 - Tackle The Pak
- 1988 - Fimiston
- 1987 - Sky Filou
- 1986 - Heron Bridge
- 1985 - Jemoyn
- 1984 - Heron Bridge
- 1983 - Hey Cabby
- 1982 - Bungler
- 1981 - Swan's Pride
- 1980 - Tsunami
- 1979 - Asian Beau
- 1978 - Junction Girl
- 1977 - Alpine Wind
- 1976 - Detonator
- 1975 - Cambana Lad
- 1974 - Cambana Lad
- 1973 - Solid Gold
- 1972 - St. Just

† Dead heat

== See also ==
- Belmont Sprint
- Strickland Stakes
- List of Australian Group races
- Group races
