= Larry Olsen (jockey) =

Australian jockey and reporter

Personal information
- Born: 18 June 1948 (age 78) Nudgee Beach, Queensland

Horse racing career
- Sport: Horse racing

Major racing wins
- Melbourne Cup (1987); Golden Slipper Stakes (1988); Stradbroke Handicap (1972); Epsom Handicap (1972, 1987); Spring Champion Stakes (1981); All Aged Stakes (1976, 1977); Rawson Stakes (1973); Craven Plate (1975)

Honours
- Queensland Racing Hall of Fame

Significant horses
- Kensei; Gunsynd

Larry Olsen (born 1948 in Nudgee Beach, Queensland) is an Australian retired jockey and former reporter for Sky Racing Australia who is best known for riding Kensei to victory in the 1987 Melbourne Cup.

Other notable wins include:

- Best Western - 1981 Spring Champion Stakes
- Dalrello - 1975 Craven Plate
- Dalrello - 1976 All Aged Stakes
- Dalrello - 1977 All Aged Stakes
- Gunsynd - 1973 Rawson Stakes
- Princess Gracious - 1987 Queensland Derby
- Regal Tan - 1978 Singapore Derby
- Sound Horizon - 1987 Epsom Handicap
- Star Watch - 1988 Golden Slipper Stakes
- Triton - 1972 Stradbroke Handicap
- Triton - 1972 Epsom Handicap

In 2007, Olsen was inducted into the Queensland Racing Hall of Fame.

Olsen married Townsville-born Maureen in the early 1970s, and remained together until her death caused by cancer, aged 61, on 1 November 2011 at a Gold Coast hospital.

Olsen was a Sky Racing commentator from 1988 until 2014.

In 2015 Olsen was involved in the Emirates Melbourne Cup tour.
