= Trevor McKee =

New Zealand Thoroughbred racehorse trainer (1937–2019)

Trevor McKee ONZM
Personal information
- Born: 22 September 1937 Thames Valley, New Zealand
- Died: 5 April 2019 (aged 81) Karaka, New Zealand
- Occupation: Racehorse trainer

Horse racing career
- Sport: Horse racing
- Career wins: 1200

Significant horses
- Sunline

Trevor John McKee ONZM (22 September 1937 – 5 April 2019) was a New Zealand Thoroughbred racehorse trainer. He was best known as the trainer, in partnership with his son Stephen, of the champion racehorse Sunline.

== Biography ==
McKee was born in the Thames Valley and started his racing career as a jockey. He trained at Takanini and for a while in partnership with Colin Curnow and later in partnership with his son Stephen, before retiring in 2006.

McKee trained or co-trained a number of other high-class horses, including:

- Bisett, winner of the 1981 Wellesley Stakes
- Bunker, winner of the 2002 Hawke's Bay Guineas
- Ebony Honour, winner of the 2005 Trentham Stakes
- Flying Luskin, winner of the 1990 Trentham Stakes, Wellington Cup and Challenge Stakes
- Interval, winner of the 1997 Awapuni Gold Cup, New Zealand St. Leger and Trentham Stakes
- Moonshine, winner of the 1994 Manawatu Sires Produce Stakes and Ellerslie Sires Produce Stakes.
- Natural, winner of the 1984 Great Northern Foal Stakes
- Royal Tiara, winner of the 1985 Auckland Cup
- Solveig, winner of the 1985 New Zealand Oaks, 1986 Avondale Cup and Captain Cook Stakes
- Super Fiesta, winner of the 1989 Ellerslie Sires Produce Stakes

In the 2002 New Year Honours, McKee was appointed an Officer of the New Zealand Order of Merit, for services to racing and the community.

== See also ==
- Roger James
- Mike Moroney
- Dave O'Sullivan
- Graeme Rogerson
