= Belmont Sprint =

Thoroughbred horse race in Perth, Western Australia

- Class: Group 3
- Location: Belmont Park Racecourse, Perth, Western Australia
- Inaugurated: 1963
- Race type: Thoroughbred
- Sponsor: Drummond Golf (2026)

Race information
- Distance: 1,400 metres
- Surface: Turf
- Qualification: Open
- Weight: Weight for Age
- Purse: $200,000 (2026)

The Belmont Sprint is a Perth Racing Group 3 Thoroughbred open Weight for Age race over a distance of 1400 metres at Belmont Park Racecourse, Perth, Western Australia in late May or early June.

== History ==
=== Grade ===
- 1963–1979 - Principal Race
- 1980 onwards - Group 3

=== Distance ===
- 1963–1972 - 6 furlongs
- 1973 - 1300 metres
- 1974–1977 - 1200 metres
- 1978–1981 - 1300 metres
- 1982 onwards - 1400 metres

=== Venue ===
2025 - Pinjarra Park

=== Conditions ===
In 2015 the race conditions were changed from a Quality handicap to Weight for Age.

=== Recent multiple winners ===
Trainers

- Grant Williams in 2014 and 2015 and in partnership with Alana Williams in 2019, 2024 and 2026
- Fred Kersley in 2008, 2010 and 2011.

Jockeys

- William Pike in 2014, 2019, 2024 and 2026
- Paul Harvey in 2004, 2008 and 2009
- Daniel Staeck in 2010, 2011 and 2013

== Winners ==
The following are past winners of the race.

- 2026 - Western Empire
- 2025 - The Boss Lady
- 2024 - Western Empire
- 2023 - Bustler
- 2022 - God Has Chosen
- 2021 - The Velvet King
- 2020 - Perfect Jewel
- 2019 - Galaxy Star
- 2018 - Material Man
- 2017 - Rock Magic
- 2016 - Wink And A Nod
- 2015 - Shining Knight
- 2014 - Elite Belle
- 2013 - Kerrific
- 2012 - Luckygray
- 2011 - Grand Nirvana
- 2010 - Grand Nirvana
- 2009 - Universal Ruler
- 2008 - Marasco
- 2007 - Beat The Storm
- 2006 - Let Go Thommo
- 2005 - Who Did It
- 2004 - Modem
- 2003 - Tribula
- 2002 - Dark 'N' Dangerous
- 2001 - Corporate Bruce
- 2000 - News Review
- 1999 - True Lover
- 1998 - San Salvador
- 1997 - Cash In The Bank
- 1996 - Bar Dreamer
- 1995 - Craft Memory
- 1994 - Bold Extreme
- 1993 - Dynamor
- 1992 - Blonde Jev
- 1991 - Global Impact
- 1990 - Tsaritsyn
- 1989 - Il Ferrari
- 1988 - Snowy Kitty
- 1987 - Another Omen
- 1986 - Soft As Snow
- 1985 - Casshoney
- 1984 - Misty Shell
- 1983 - Art Roy
- 1982 - Kiwi Bride
- 1981 - Echoes Of Spring
- 1980 - Tangiers
- 1979 - National Boy
- 1978 - National Boy
- 1977 - Burgess Queen
- 1976 - Interchange
- 1975 - Craigie Boy
- 1974 - Minor Control
- 1973 - Clear Mak
- 1972 - All Legal
- 1971 - Baywana
- 1970 - Countlike
- 1969 - Firelight
- 1968 - Santaland
- 1967 - Aquitania
- 1966 - Cosy Comet
- 1965 - De Gaullio
- 1964 - Covanus
- 1963 - Free Style

== See also ==
- Hyperion Stakes
- Strickland Stakes
- List of Australian Group races
- Group races
