= Strickland Stakes =

- Class: Group 3
- Location: Belmont Park Racecourse, Perth, Western Australia
- Inaugurated: 1901
- Race type: Thoroughbred
- Sponsor: Swan Draught (2026)

Race information
- Distance: 2,000 metres
- Surface: Turf
- Weight: Weight for Age
- Purse: $200,000 (2026)

The Strickland Stakes is a Perth Racing Group 3 Thoroughbred horse race held under Weight for Age conditions, over a distance of 2000 metres at Belmont Park Racecourse, Perth, Western Australia.

== History ==
The first event was held in 1901 as the WATC December Stakes. The race was moved to November and held in that month until 1998. In 2000 the race was run in January and in 2002 it was scheduled for April. Since 2011 the race has been held in June.

=== Distance ===
- 1901–1905 - 1 1/4 miles
- 1906 - 1 1/2 miles
- 1907–1909 - 1 3/8 miles
- 1910–1972 - 1 1/8 miles
- 1973–2004 – 1800 metres
- 2005 – 2000 metres
- 2006–2010 – 1800 metres
- 2011 onwards - 2000 metres

=== Venue ===
The race was initially held in April at Ascot Racecourse. In 2011 when the race was moved to Belmont Park it was held in June.

- 1901–2004 - Ascot Racecourse
- 2005 - Belmont Park
- 2006–2010 - Ascot Racecourse
- 2011–2024 - Belmont Park
- 2025 - Pinjarra Park
- 2026 - Belmont Park

== Winners ==
The following are past winners of the race.

- 2026 - Western Empire
- 2025 - Admiration Express
- 2024 - Let's Galahvant
- 2023 - Last Of The Line
- 2022 - Prince Turbo
- 2021 - Naughty By Nature
- 2020 - Material Man
- 2019 - Galaxy Star
- 2018 - Material Man
- 2017 - Scales of Justice
- 2016 - Ihtsahymn
- 2015 - Fuchsia Bandana
- 2014 - Fancy Feet
- 2013 - Kincaple
- 2012 - Mr Moet
- 2011 - God Has Spoken
- 2010 - Marasco
- 2009 - Marasco
- 2008 - Action Pak
- 2007 - Forest Frolic
- 2006 - Exchequer
- 2005 - True Steel
- 2004 - Dedicated Miss
- 2003 - Money Is Magic
- 2002 - †Gwalia Girl / Finito
- 2001 - Finito
- 2000 - Iron Horse
- 1999 - ‡race not held
- 1998 - Summer Beau
- 1997 - News Review
- 1996 - Western Cossack
- 1995 - Forge On
- 1994 - Prime Again
- 1993 - Wabasso
- 1992 - Lincoln's Court
- 1991 - Higginsville
- 1990 - Acquired
- 1989 - Timeless Action
- 1988 - Perfect Answer
- 1987 - Tabharry
- 1986 - Track Jester
- 1985 - Bungling
- 1984 - My Serene
- 1983 - Haulpak's Image
- 1982 - Kiwi Bride
- 1981 - Aldric
- 1980 - Belle Talk
- 1979 - Regimental Honour
- 1978 - Velvet's Son
- 1977 - Double East
- 1976 - Unaware
- 1975 - Ngawyni
- 1974 - Haymaker
- 1973 - Gilt Patten
- 1972 - Millefleurs
- 1971 - Chez Felix
- 1970 - Surrender
- 1969 - Chemech
- 1968 - Jolly Aster
- 1967 - Hilney
- 1966 - Jolly Aster
- 1965 - Royal Coral
- 1964 - Rack And Ruin
- 1963 - Bernguard
- 1962 - Nicopolis
- 1961 - First Orl
- 1960 - Chestillion
- 1959 - Kuantan
- 1958 - On Guard
- 1957 - Tribal Ring
- 1956 - Lady Orator
- 1955 - Asteroid
- 1954 - Just Peter
- 1953 - Moderniste
- 1952 - Raconteur
- 1951 - Chestnut Lady
- 1950 - Jovial Lad
- 1949 - Lady Lucia
- 1948 - Victory Lad
- 1947 - Lady Lucia
- 1946 - Filipino
- 1945 - Lord Treat
- 1942–44 - race not held
- 1941 - Royal Standard
- 1940 - Romanette
- 1939 - True Flight
- 1938 - Gay Prince
- 1937 - First Consul
- 1936 - Panto
- 1935 - Yaringa
- 1934 - Jolly Fair
- 1933 - D'Artagnan
- 1932 - Jolly Fair
- 1931 - Peggy Poet
- 1930 - Prince Paladin
- 1929 - Runabout
- 1928 - Good Hope
- 1927 - Maple
- 1926 - Maple
- 1925 - Eracre
- 1924 - Huette
- 1923 - Lilypond
- 1922 - Scorpius
- 1921 - Easingwold
- 1920 - Bobaris
- 1919 - Mistico
- 1918 - New Tipperary
- 1917 - Post Laddie
- 1916 - Mistico
- 1915 - Jolly Beggar
- 1914 - Pilbarra
- 1913 - Lilyveil
- 1912 - Maori Lad
- 1911 - Florabel
- 1910 - Thorina
- 1909 - Annapolis
- 1908 - Prophecy
- 1907 - Bundorrie
- 1906 - May King
- 1905 - Nothos
- 1904 - Fifeness
- 1903 - Fifeness
- 1902 - Honeydew
- 1901 - Limber

† Dead heat
‡ Change in racing calendar

== See also ==
- Belmont Sprint
- Hyperion Stakes
- List of Australian Group races
- Group races
