= Mummify =

Australian-bred Thoroughbred racehorse

- Sire: Jeune
- Grandsire: Kalaglow
- Dam: Cleopatra's Girl
- Damsire: At Talaq
- Sex: Gelding
- Foaled: 1999
- Country: Australia
- Colour: Bay
- Breeder: C. D. Green
- Owner: Racing syndicate
- Trainer: Lee Freedman
- Record: 48: 9–8-9
- Earnings: A$5,134,320

Major wins
- South Australian Derby (2003); Caulfield Cup (2003); Underwood Stakes (2003); AJC Chairman's Handicap (2004); Caulfield Stakes (2004); Singapore Airlines International Cup (2005); Craven Plate (2005)
- Last updated on 23 February 2009

Mummify (24 August 1999 – 16 October 2005) was a popular Australian Thoroughbred racehorse that amassed A$5,134,320 in prize money and won five Group One races, including the 2003 Caulfield Cup and the Singapore Airlines International Cup.

He was sired by Melbourne Cup winner and Champion Australasian Older Horse Jeune (GB), his dam Cleopatra's Girl, by At Talaq (USA). Mummify was sold at the 2001 Magic Millions Adelaide Yearling Sale for $41,000. Mummify was trained by Lee Freedman and gave the trainer his 100th Group 1 victory and first international race win.

Mummify finished his career with 9 wins and 17 placings from 48 starts; prize money in excess of $5 million, placing him in the top 20 prize money winners in Australian racing history; and an international rating of 118.

The career of Mummify was cut short in the 2005 Caulfield Cup, in which he shattered the sesamoid bone of his near foreleg and was subsequently euthanized, after running third carrying top weight and attempting to lead all the way in the race.
