= Ted Van Heemst Stakes =

Horse race in Perth, Western Australia

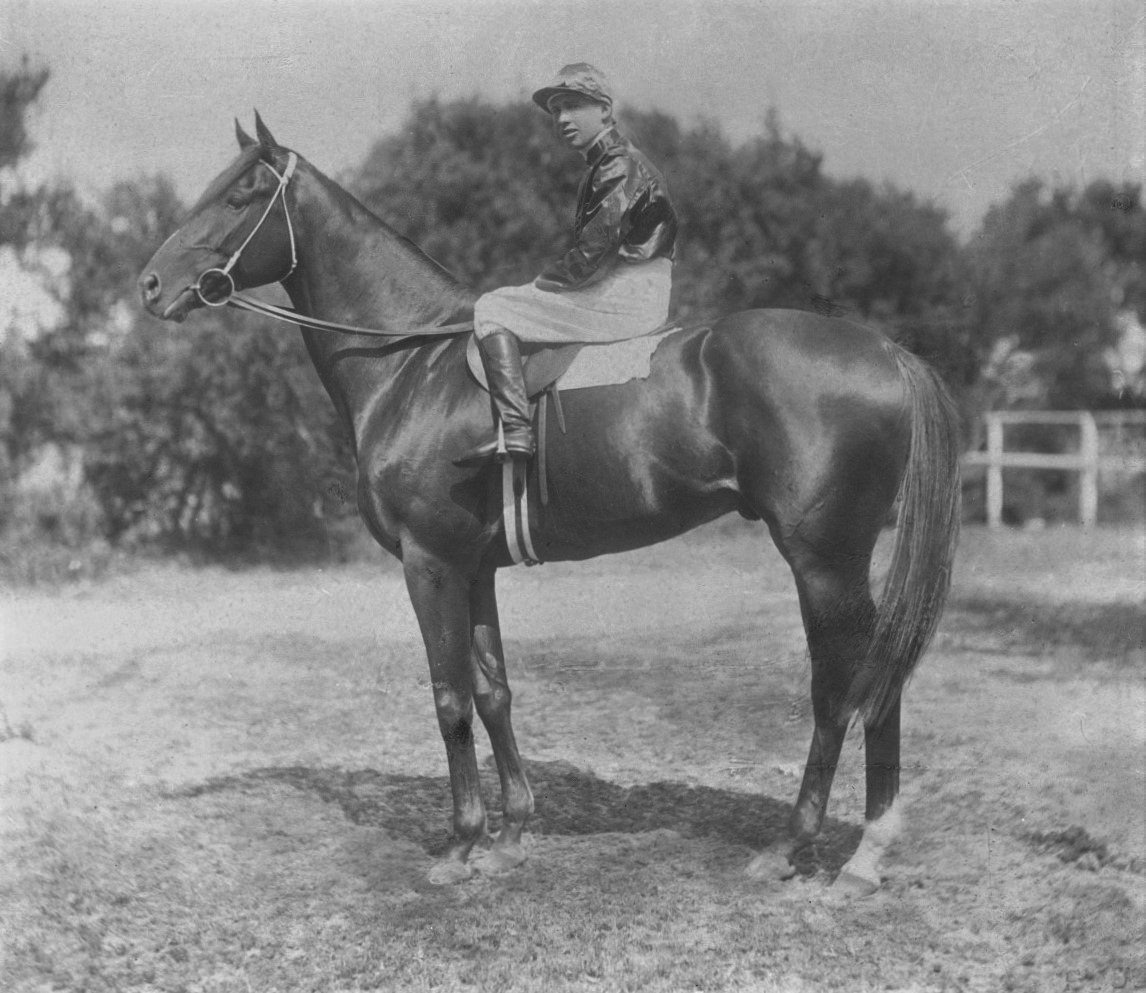
- Eurythmic, 1920 winner
- Class: Group 2
- Location: Ascot Racecourse
- Inaugurated: 1914
- Race type: Thoroughbred

Race information
- Distance: 2,100 metres
- Surface: Turf
- Track: Left-handed
- Qualification: Three year old and older
- Weight: Weight for age
- Purse: A$300,000 (2025)

The Ted Van Heemst Stakes is a Perth Racing Group 2 Thoroughbred horse race held under weight for age conditions, for horses aged three years old and upwards, over a distance of 2100 metres at Ascot Racecourse, Perth, Western Australia in December.

== History ==
The race is considered the main lead up to the Perth Cup held on New Year's Day.

The distance of the race was reduced by 300 metres (2008) to coincide with the shortening of the Perth Cup from 3200 metres to 2400 metres in 2009.

In 2003 the race was run at Belmont Park Racecourse.

In 2016 the race was renamed to the Ted Van Heemst Stakes in honour of Western Australian Racing Hall of Famer Ted van Heemst.

=== 1953 racebook ===
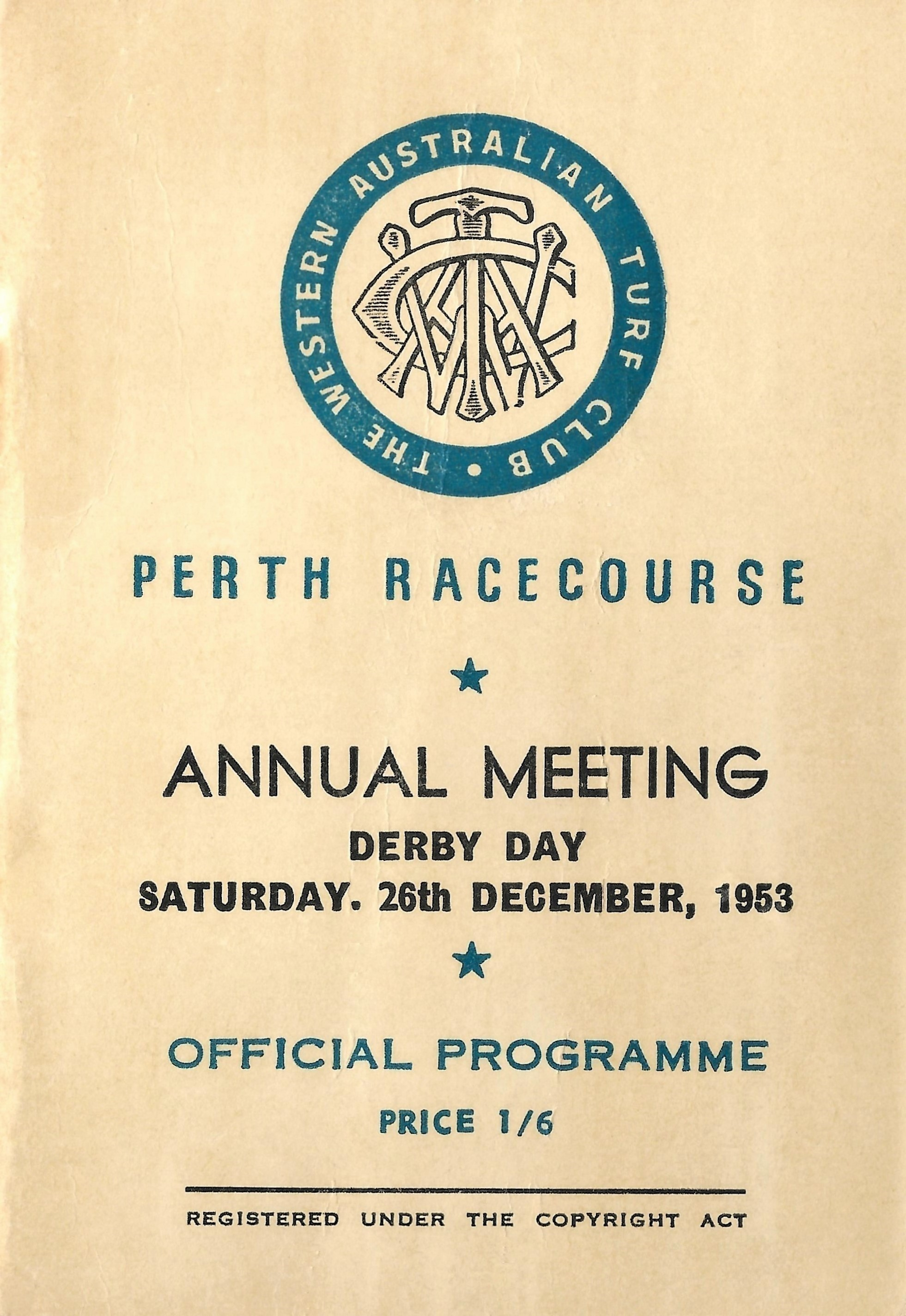
1953 WATC Derby racebook front cover

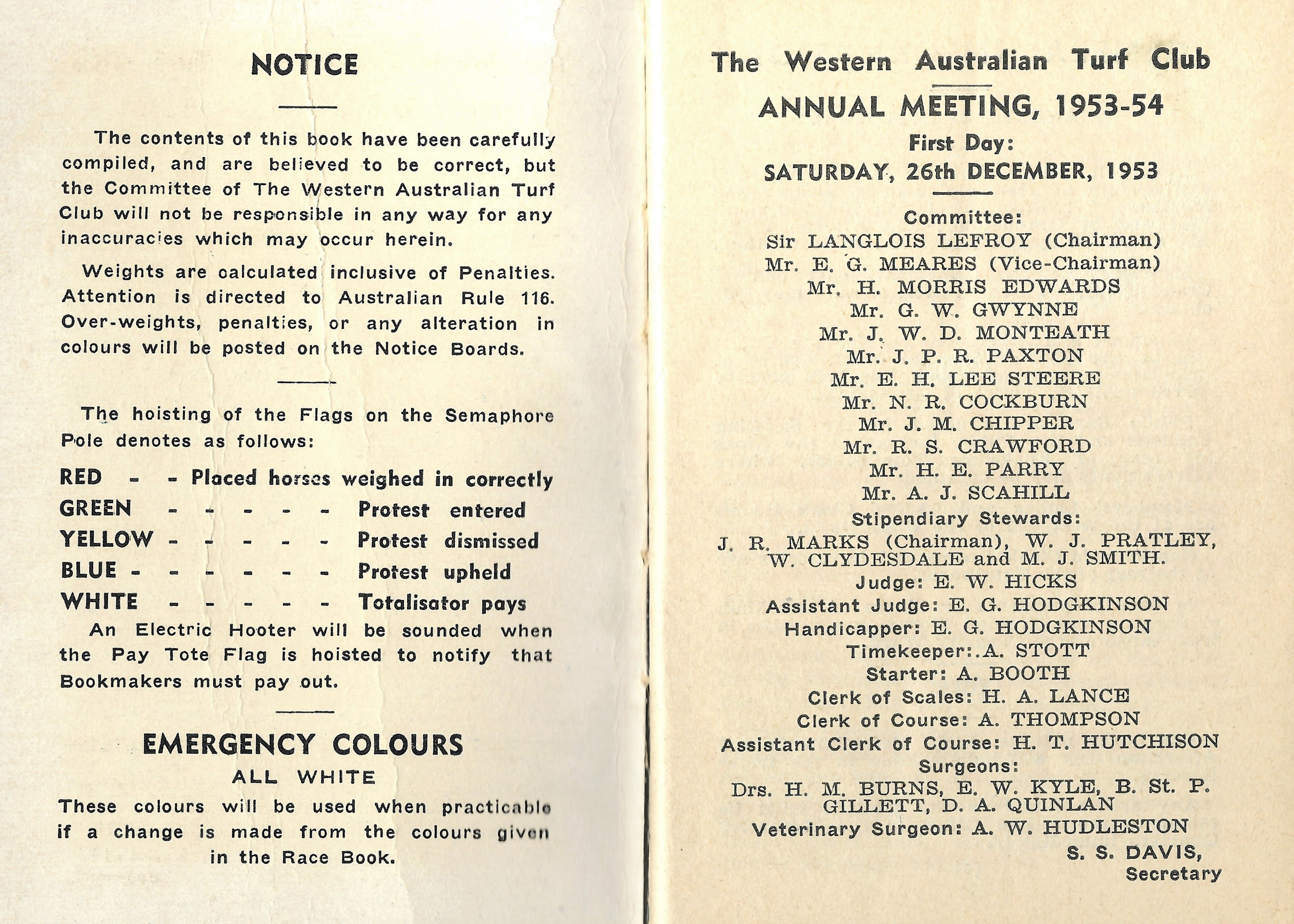
1953 WATC Derby showing raceday officials

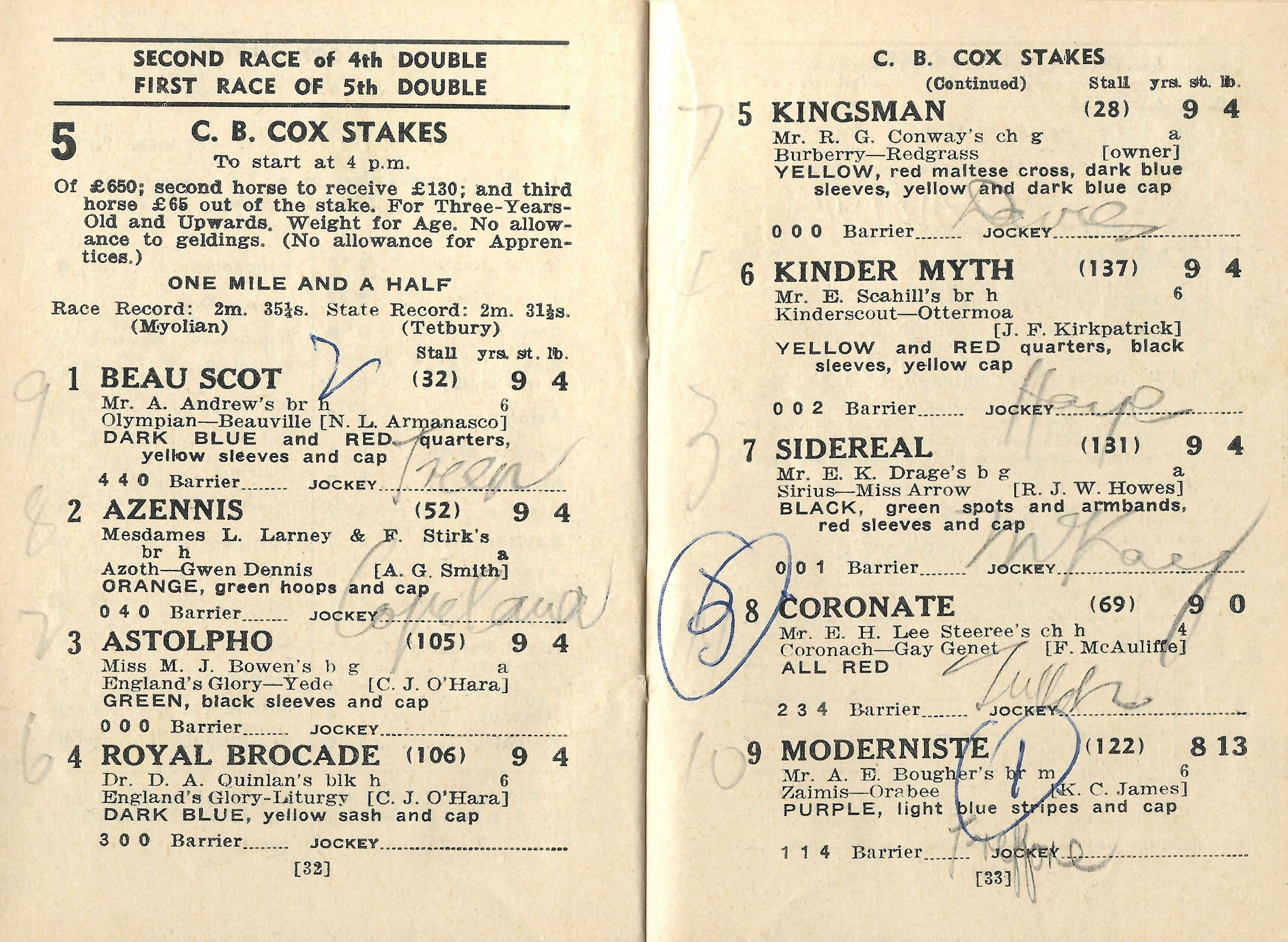
1953 WATC C.B. Cox Stakes page showing the winner, Moderniste

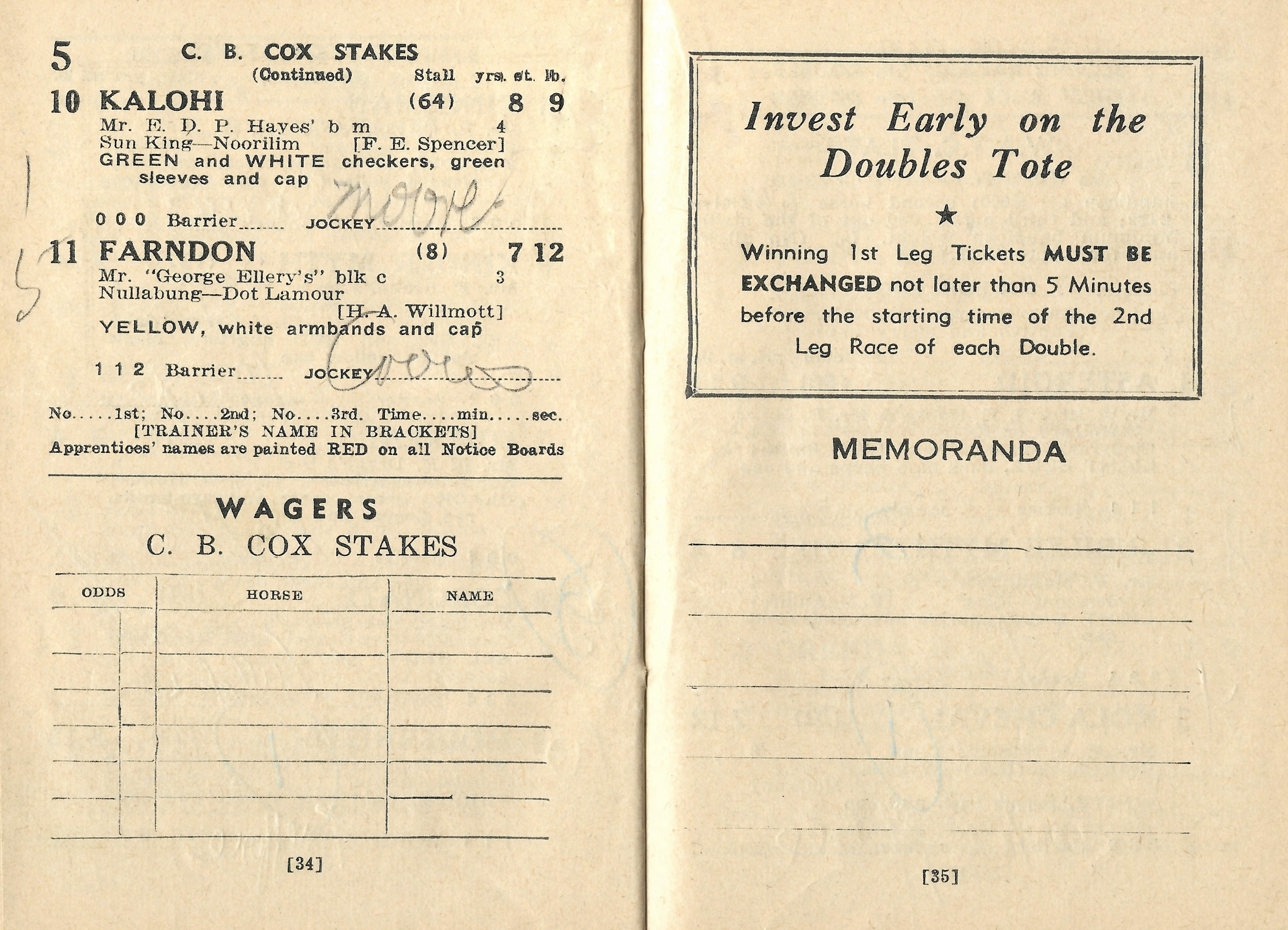
1953 WATC C.B. Cox Stakes page starters and results

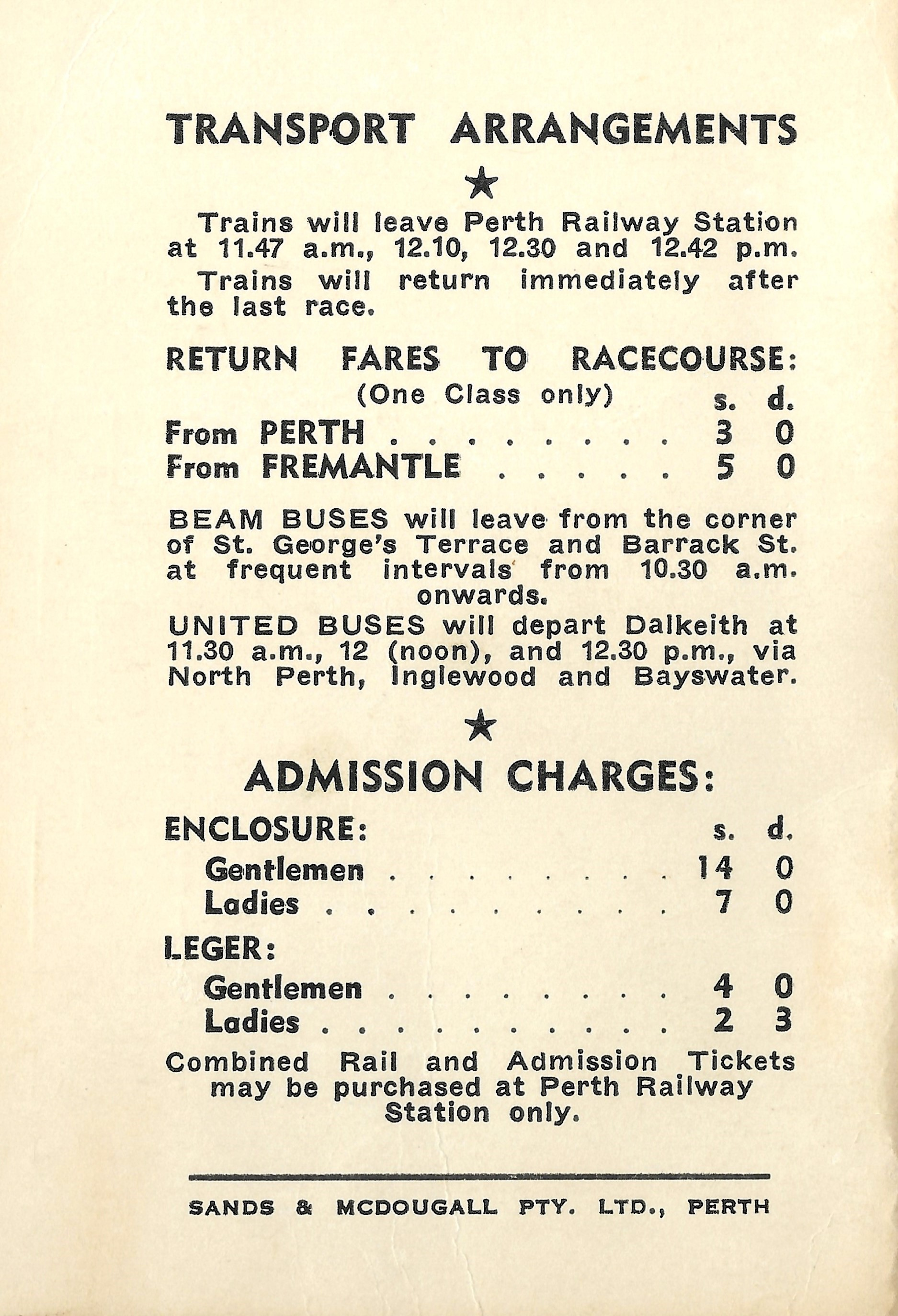
Back cover showing transport arrangements and admission charges

=== Name ===
- 1914–1919 - Grandstand Plate
- 1920–2015 - C B Cox Stakes
- 2016 onwards - Ted Van Heemst Stakes

=== Distance ===
- 1914–1931 - 1 1/2 miles (~2400 metres)
- 1932–1933 - 1 mile (~1609 metres)
- 1934–1936 - 1 1/2 miles (~2400 metres)
- 1937 - 1 mile (~1609 metres)
- 1938–1942 - 1 1/2 miles (~2400 metres)
- 1945–1951 - 1 3/8 miles (~2200 metres)
- 1952–1971 - 1 1/2 miles (~2400 metres)
- 1972–2007 – 2400 metres
- 2008 onwards - 2100 metres

=== Grade ===
- 1914–1978 - Principal race
- 1979 onwards - Group 2

== Winners ==
Past winners of the race are as follows.

- 2025 - Apulia
- 2024 - In Good Order
- 2023 - Numerian
- 2022 - Marocchino
- 2021 - Regal Power
- 2020 - Truly Great
- 2019 - Regal Power
- 2018 - Galaxy Star
- 2017 - Pounamu
- 2016 - Perfect Reflection
- 2015 - Delicacy
- 2014 - Elite Belle
- 2013 - Ihtsahymn
- 2012 - Mr Moet
- 2011 - God Has Spoken
- 2010 - Colour Correct
- 2009 - Lords Ransom
- 2008 - Gilded Venom
- 2007 - Cats Fun
- 2006 - †Daka's Gem / Scenic Shot
- 2005 - Early Express
- 2004 - Free At Last
- 2003 - Celtus
- 2002 - Bold Mirage
- 2001 - Never Blue
- 2000 - Old Money
- 1999 - Old Cobber
- 1998 - Jack Daniels
- 1997 - Old Cobber
- 1996 - Beau Heed
- 1995 - Dark Ksar
- 1994 - Sugar Raegala
- 1993 - Palatious
- 1992 - Mr Raku
- 1991 - Mirror Magic
- 1990 - Ideal Centreman
- 1989 - Tawrrific
- 1988 - Saratov
- 1987 - Arcolad
- 1986 - Haulpak's Image
- 1985 - Amber's Double
- 1984 - Phizam
- 1983 - Haulpak's Image
- 1982 - Nicholas John
- 1981 - Brechin Castle
- 1980 - Yashmak
- 1979 - Regimental Honour
- 1978 - Meliador
- 1977 - Farranfore
- 1976 - Tropical Chief
- 1975 - Tropical Chief
- 1974 - Battle Heights
- 1973 - Fade
- 1972 - Piping Lane
- 1971 - Aubella
- 1970 - Nauprius
- 1969 - Jolly Aster
- 1968 - Special Reward
- 1967 - Hilney
- 1966 - Royal Coral
- 1965 - Royal Coral
- 1964 - Rack And Ruin
- 1963 - Cygnet Star
- 1962 - Bay Count
- 1961 - Little Empire
- 1960 - England's Dust
- 1959 - Sparkling Blue
- 1958 - Zaicia
- 1957 - Tribal Ring
- 1956 - Vestment
- 1955 - Melton Prince
- 1954 - Coronate
- 1953 - Moderniste
- 1952 - Myolian
- 1951 - Kingsman
- 1950 - Dhostar
- 1949 - Lady Lucia
- 1948 - San Sanatra
- 1947 - Kalamunda
- 1946 - Lord Treat
- 1945 - Smithie
- 1944 - race not held
- 1943 - race not held
- 1942 - race not held
- 1942 - Hestia
- 1941 - Gay Prince
- 1940 - Gay Balkan
- 1939 - Gay Balkan
- 1938 - Maikai
- 1937 - Battery Gold
- 1936 - Yaringa
- 1935 - Hyperion
- 1934 - D'Artagnan
- 1933 - Gloaman
- 1932 - Taisho
- 1931 - The Dimmer
- 1930 - Runabout
- 1929 - Hint
- 1928 - Maple
- 1927 - Maple
- 1926 - Eracre
- 1925 - Eracre
- 1924 - Lilypond
- 1923 - Jolly Cosy
- 1922 - Brilliant Sunshine
- 1921 - Bobaris
- 1920 - Eurythmic
- 1919 - New Tipperary
- 1918 - Bardeur
- 1917 - Mistico
- 1916 - High Rock
- 1915 - Corstep
- 1914 - Radnor

† Dead heat

== See also ==
- Perth Cup
- List of Australian Group races
- Group races
