= Tony Allan (jockey) =

New Zealand jockey

Tony Allan (born in Pukekohe, Auckland Region) is a New Zealand jockey

He started his apprenticeship at age 16 to Grant Searle in Levin. He said he was inspired to become a jockey by his late father who would frequently take him to the Levin racecourse.

He is best known for riding Empire Rose to victory in the 1988 Melbourne Cup.

Over the course of his racing career Tony accomplished 12 Group 1 wins.

== Notable wins ==
The following are some of the major races Tony has won in his career.

Year	Race	Horse	Trainer(s)
1999	Hawke's Bay Guineas	Buzz Lightyear	Robert Priscott, Te Awamutu
1999	Desert Gold Stakes	Thee Old Dragon	Alan Jones & Brett McDonald, Cambridge
1997	Manawatu Sires Produce Stakes	Kilmore Quay	John Wheeler, New Plymouth
1997	Fayette Park Stud Stakes (G2), Ellerslie	Great Command	Michael Moroney, Matamata
1996	Waikato Guineas (G3)	Great Command	Michael Moroney, Matamata
1996	Stewards Stakes Handicap (G3)	Kincaple Lad	Neil Coulbeck, Leithfield
1996	New Zealand St. Leger	Lady Dahar	
1995	Hawkes Bay Cup	Italian Saint	Noel Eales, Awapuni
1995	Telegraph Handicap	Lord Tridan	Michael Moroney, Matamata
1994	Avondale Cup	Ball Park	Michael Moroney, Matamata
1990	New Zealand Stakes	Riverina Charm	Laurie Laxon
1989	New Zealand St. Leger	Saveur	
1989	Trentham Stakes	Empire Rose	Laurie Laxon
1988	Melbourne Cup	Empire Rose	Laurie Laxon
1988	LKS Mackinnon Stakes	Empire Rose	Laurie Laxon
1987	New Zealand 2000 Guineas	Weston Lea	Laurie Laxon
1987	New Zealand Cup	Empire Rose	Laurie Laxon

== Career ==
In 2003, Allan admitted to using methamphetamine. However, he has subsequently worked hard to change his lifestyle and become clean. Tony retired in 2005 and moved to Japan for a break, riding trackwork for around 10 years in Hokkaido before a job with Sydney trainers Peter and Paul Snowden. On 27 May 2017 Tony made a comeback to race day riding in New Zealand.

His first winner back in New Zealand was on Thursday 28 June 2017 at Waverley on My Cool Boy. On Friday 16 March 2018 Tony rode his 1000th winner on New Zealand soil in the opening race at Te Aroha aboard Aigne.

In 2019 it was announced that Tony would head to Queensland to continue his riding career comeback for New Zealand trainer Paddy Busuttin, who was also to come out of retirement to train at Deagon, near Eagle Farm. Tony stated he had previously won "a couple at Eagle Farm and running third on Finezza Belle for Laurie Laxon in a Group Two (Prime Minister’s Cup, 2400m) at the Gold Coast ... I also ran second on Sapio in the Brisbane Cup (Gr. 1, 3200m) and I rode Poetic Prince when he ran second to Planet Ruler in the Queensland Guineas (Gr.2, 1600m)".

In December 2019 Tony came back to New Zealand and resumed Raceday riding.

In 2021 Tony commenced as a horse trainer at Otaki.

== See also ==
- Thoroughbred racing in New Zealand
