= Subzero (horse) =

Australian-bred Thoroughbred racehorse

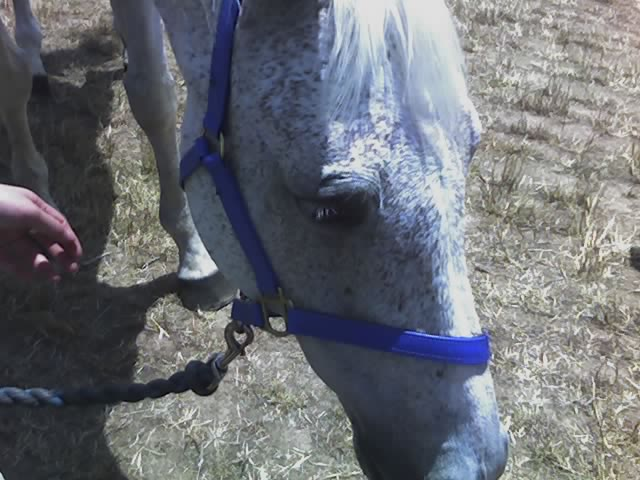
- Sire: Kala Dancer
- Grandsire: Niniski
- Dam: Wiley Trade
- Damsire: To Market
- Sex: Gelding
- Foaled: 26 September 1988; Australia
- Died: 29 August 2020 (aged 31); Bendigo, Victoria, Australia
- Country: Australia
- Colour: Grey
- Breeder: Wakefield Stud Management, NSW
- Owner: D. H. K. Investments
- Trainer: Lee Freedman
- Record: 48: 6-6-5
- Earnings: $2,008,100

Major wins
- South Australian Derby (1992); Adelaide Cup (1992); Melbourne Cup (1992)
- Last updated on 23 June 2007

Subzero, nicknamed "Subbie" (26 September 1988 – 29 August 2020), was an Australian thoroughbred racehorse that won the 1992 Melbourne Cup.

== Life and career ==
Subzero was foaled in Australia. Trained by Lee Freedman and ridden by veteran jockey Greg Hall, the four-year-old revelled in the rain-affected going in the 1992 Melbourne Cup to defeat the favourite, Veandercross, and the two-miler Castletown. The win was to be Subzero's last, but his fame was assured as one of the few grey winners of the race in the post-war era. In May 1992, Greg Hall rode him to victory in the Adelaide Cup.

Upon retirement from racing, Subzero was employed as the clerk of the course's horse by Racing Victoria's long-time clerk, Graham Salisbury, and made numerous television appearances at charity functions and schools. In July 2008, he was fully retired as he had developed arthritis.

In October 2009, it was reported that Subzero might need to be put down as the medication he needed for his arthritis became unavailable in Australia. Subsequently, the medication was sourced from the United States, and Subzero continued appearing in public. Subzero eventually went to live at the Salisbury family’s rural property at Heathcote, in central Victoria. In his retirement, he was gentle-natured, very patient with children, and remained with Graham Salisbury until Salisbury's death in June 2020.

On 29 August 2020, he was euthanized at the Bendigo Equine Hospital due to the onset of heart failure. He was 31.

== See also ==
- List of Melbourne Cup winners
