= Tawrrific =

New Zealand-bred Thoroughbred racehorse

- Sire: Tawfiq
- Grandsire: Blushing Groom
- Dam: Joyarty
- Damsire: Noble Bijou
- Sex: Stallion
- Foaled: 21 November 1984
- Died: 1999 (aged 14–15)
- Country: New Zealand
- Colour: Bay
- Breeder: Mr N. T. Broderick & Mesdames L. H. Lillicrapp & M. J. Secretan
- Owner: B. F. Avery, et al.
- Trainer: Lee Freedman
- Record: 67: 9-7-8
- Earnings: A$1,558,434

Major wins
- South Australian St Leger (1988); AJC St Leger (1989); Melbourne Cup (1989); CB Cox Stakes (1989)
- Last updated on 29 October 2009

Tawrrific (1984–1999) was a Thoroughbred racehorse who is best remembered for winning the 1989 Melbourne Cup. Trained by Lee Freedman and ridden by Shane Dye, he won in the then record time of three minutes and 17.1 seconds.

== Early career ==
After doing his early racing in New Zealand, Tawrrific won the South Australian St Leger at three, and, despite finishing 12th in the 1988 Melbourne Cup, had shown staying talent in winning the AJC St Leger at four, and finishing fourth in the Sydney and Brisbane Cups.

== Melbourne Cup winner ==
Allotted 54 kilograms for the 1989 Melbourne Cup, Tawrrific was placed in lead-up races at Sandown, Caulfield, Flemington, and Moonee Valley, but fell out of favour with many punters when finishing second-last in the Caulfield Cup. In the Melbourne Cup, Tawrrific came down the centre of the track with a well-timed run by Dye, and defeated his stablemate Super Impose by just over two lengths. The victory was Freedman's first in the race, and a significant career milestone for the young trainer. The win also significant in the rise of Dye, a former champion apprentice in New Zealand.

== Later career ==
Following the Melbourne Cup, Tawrrific won the Cox Stakes, in Perth, and raced for a further 18 months, but with limited success. At six, he won a race over 2,500 metres at Flemington – which now carries Listed status – and finished 16th in the 1990 Melbourne Cup.

== Stud career ==
Exported to Ireland on 15 January 1999, Tawrrific stood as a jumps stallion at Tullaghansleek Stud in Castletown-Geoghegan in County Westmeath, and the Australian Stud Book records him as the sire of two stakeswinners. Tawriffic died just a few months later from a twisted bowel.
