= Kensei (horse) =

New Zealand-bred Thoroughbred racehorse

Kensei (NZ)
- Sire: Blarney Kiss (USA)
- Grandsire: Irish Lancer (USA)
- Dam: Kitty’s Dream (NZ)
- Damsire: Nauplius (NZ)
- Sex: Gelding
- Foaled: 1982
- Died: 2002
- Country: New Zealand
- Colour: Chestnut
- Breeder: D F Duffy & G S Hale
- Owner: K M Mitchell, R J Lazarus, A E N Curtis
- Trainer: (1) Neville Voigt (2) Les J Bridge, Randwick
- Record: 69: 9-6-7
- Earnings: $1,139,330

Major wins
- Melbourne Cup (1987); Castlemaine Gold Cup (1986)
- Last updated on 28 December 2011

Kensei (1982−2002) was a New Zealand-bred Thoroughbred racehorse, who won the 1987 Melbourne Cup.

He was sired by Blarney Kiss (USA), who was also the sire of 1983 Melbourne Cup winner Kiwi. His dam was Kitty's Dream (NZ) who was by Nauplius (NZ).

Les Bridge had taken over the training from Neville Voigt and ridden by Larry Olsen won the race by ½ length carrying just 51.5 kg from the champion mare Empire Rose. Prior to his win in the Melbourne Cup, Kensei ran second in the Group 2 Newcastle Gold Cup and second in the Group 1 Metropolitan at Randwick & won the 1987 Grafton Cup.

Kensei, with Larry Olsen aboard again, was 10th in the 1988 Melbourne Cup.

The CRJC (Clarence River Jockey Club) hold an annual dinner his name called the 'Kensei Club' where local businesses have a chance to win the naming rights for that years Grafton Cup. There is also a bar at the back of the concourse underneath the grandstand that is named after Kensei.

Sutton Farm in Scone owned by part owner Russ Lazarus became the retirement home for Kensei until his passing in 2002.
