= Greg Hall (jockey) =

Australian jockey

Greg Hall, nicknamed "The G" (born 1956 or 1957), is a retired Australian jockey who is best known for riding Subzero to victory in the 1992 Melbourne Cup.

Hall also won a Cox Plate, two Golden Slippers and two Victoria Derbies riding for the likes of Lloyd Williams, Sheikh Mohammed and Kerry Packer. He rode 848 winners, including 42 Group One winners, before retiring during the 2000/01 season. His father, Ron Hall, was a jumps jockey, and his son, Nicholas Hall, was also a jockey.

His autobiography, Ride to Win, written with Melbourne journalist Rod Nicholson, was published in 2003.
