= John Marshall (jockey) =

Australian jockey

John Marshall (c. 1958 – 23 December 2018) was an Australian jockey from Perth, who was best known for riding Rogan Josh to victory in the 1999 Melbourne Cup.

== Career statistics ==
- Career Winners: 2,000
- Career Group 1 (G1) Wins: 36
- Career Group 2 (G2) Wins: 36
- Career Group 3 (G3) Wins: 30
- Career Listed (LR) Wins: 68
- Total Stakes (Group/Listed) Wins: 170

Marshall won the Sydney Jockey Premiership in the 1987/88 season with 86 wins, beating Jim Cassidy with 65 wins.

He also finished 2nd in the Sydney Jockey's Premiership 3 times:

- 1982/83 season – 52 wins (won by Ron Quinton: 90 wins),
- 1986/87 season – 85 1/2 wins (won by Malcolm Johnston: 92 1/2 wins),
- 1989/90 season – 67 wins (won by Mick Dittman: 75 wins).

== Group 1 wins ==
  - 1982
    - AJC Oaks (2400m): Sheraco
  - 1983
    - Epsom Handicap (1600m): Cool River
  - 1984
    - AJC Derby (2400m): Prolific
    - Sydney Cup (3200m): Trissaro
  - 1985
    - Randwick Guineas (1600m): Spirit of Kingston
    - Rosehill Guineas (2000m): Spirit of Kingston
  - 1986
    - Doomben 10,000 (1350m): Between Ourselves
    - Toorak Handicap (1600m): Canny Lass
  - 1987
    - Champagne Stakes (1600m): Sky Chase
    - Spring Champion Stakes (2000m): Beau Zam
    - Rosehill Guineas (2000m): Ring Joe
    - The Galaxy (1100m) Princely Heart
    - Doomben 10,000 (1350m): Broad Reach
    - George Main Stakes (1600m) : Campaign King
  - 1988
    - Rosehill Guineas (2000m): Sky Chase
    - George Ryder Stakes (1500m): Campaign King
    - Caulfied Stakes (2000m): Sky Chase
    - Ranvet Stakes (2000m): Beau Zam
    - Tancred Stakes (2400m): Beau Zam
    - AJC Derby (2400m): Beau Zam
    - Queen Elizabeth Stakes (2000m): Beau Zam
    - Doomben 10,000 (1350m): Campaign King
    - Stradbroke Handicap (1400m): Campaign King
  - 1989
    - Ranvet Stakes (2000m): Beau Zam
    - AJC Sires Produce Stakes (1400m): Reganza
    - Queensland Sires Produce Stakes (1400m): Zamoff
    - Stradbroke Handicap (1400m): Robian Steel
  - 1990
    - Rosehill Guineas (2000m): Solar Circle
    - George Main Stakes (1600m): Shaftesbury Avenue
  - 1991
    - All Aged Stakes (1600m): Shaftesbury Avenue
  - 1996
    - Coolmore Classic (1500m): Chlorophyll
  - 1997
    - Ranvet Stakes (2000m): Arkady
  - 1998
    - AJC Oaks (2400m): On Air
  - 1999
    - Epsom Handicap (1600m): Allez Suez
    - Mackinnon Stakes (2000m): Rogan Josh
    - Melbourne Cup (3200m): Rogan Josh

Marshall died of cancer at age 60 on 23 December 2018.
