= Lee Freedman =

Australian racehorse trainer (b.1956)

Personal information
- Born: 12 August 1956 (age 70) Sydney, Australia
- Occupation: Thoroughbred racehorse trainer

Horse racing career
- Sport: Horse racing

Racing awards
- Australian Racing Hall of Fame (2003)

Significant horses
- Doriemus; Makybe Diva; Miss Andretti; Mummify; Subzero; Super Impose; Tawrrific

David Lee Freedman (born 12 August 1956) is an Australian thoroughbred racehorse trainer. and Hall of Fame inductee. In partnership with brothers Anthony, Michael, and Richard, he has been a prolific winner of Australia's major races in past 20 years, with four Golden Slippers, four Caulfield Cups, two Cox Plates, and five Melbourne Cups, including two of the three won by Makybe Diva. On 19 June 2007 he won the prestigious King's Stand Stakes at the United Kingdom's Royal Ascot racecourse with his champion mare, Miss Andretti.

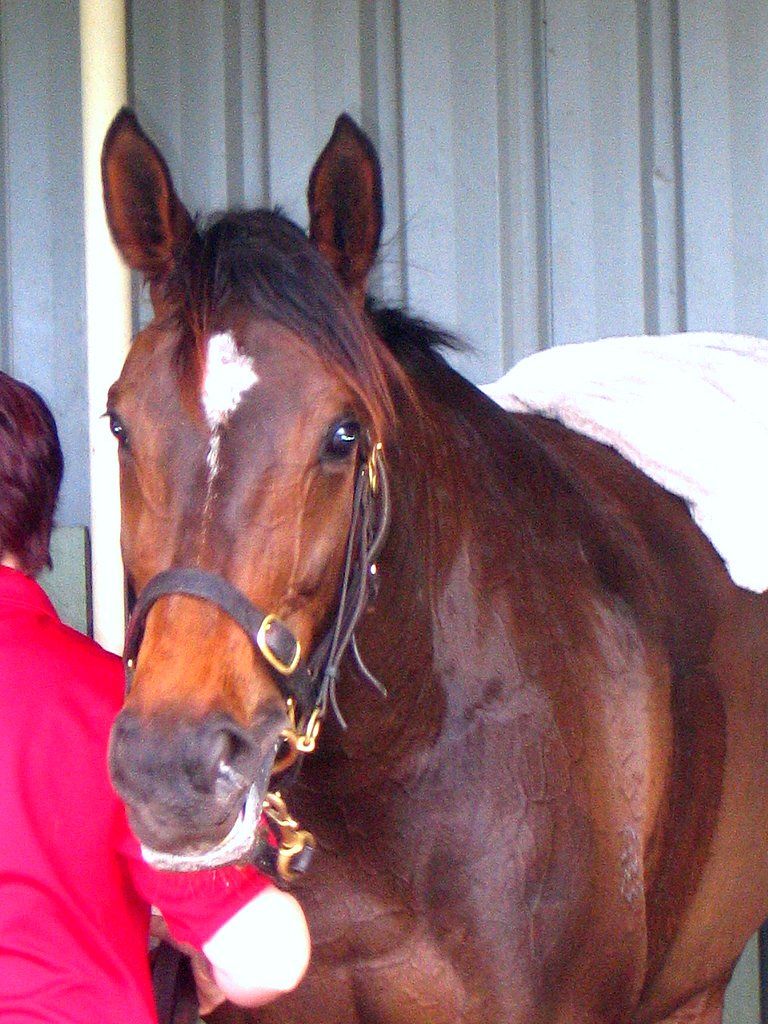
Freedman is best known as the trainer of Melbourne Cup winner Makybe Diva

== Early life ==
Freedman was born 12 August 1956, in Sydney to Anthony William and Estelle Dawn Freedman. His great-grandfather, David Freedman, was a Russian Jew who fled from Elizavetgrad (now Kirovohrad in Ukraine) to America, via Germany and London. His son Allan, Lee Freedman's grandfather, was an electrical engineer who came to Australia in 1927, meeting his future wife Maudie McLachlan on board the ship. Maudie's father was William H. McLachlan, a jockey who rode Melbourne Cup winners in 1909, 1910 and 1917.

Lee Freedman gained an interest in racing at a young age when his father Tony took up horse breeding and training after retiring as a property developer.

Educated at The Scots College in Sydney, Freedman studied at Australian National University for a year, but was quickly bored and dropped out to become involved in the breeding industry himself, running the stud farm owned by the family, near Yass in Southern New South Wales.

== Beginnings as a trainer ==
Freedman later became a horse trainer, initially setting up stables at Warwick Farm in Sydney. Training only a small team of horses, Freedman and stable foreman and brother Anthony found it difficult to train winners at Warwick Farm, where facilities were inferior to those at Sydney's premier track, Randwick.

Freedman purchased the stable and home vacated by outstanding trainer Bart Cummings who had moved to Sydney. Freedman soon found success with classy filly Sauna, who was Group One placed and smart gelding Affected. His first Group One winner was another filly, Miss Clipper, who won the SAJC Australasian Oaks.

== Early success ==
Freedman's step towards training stardom came in the 1989 Melbourne Cup, when he trained the first two runners home, winning the race with stayer Tawrrific, ridden by Shane Dye, who was followed home by Super Impose. 'Super', as he was known, won eight Group One races, including the Epsom Handicap and Doncaster Handicap twice. His most famous victory was in the 1992 Cox Plate as an eight-year-old. Super Impose's form had been disappointing that spring, and was in the twilight of his career. The favourite for the race was another Freedman horse, Naturalism. At around the 600-meter mark, Naturalism was involved in a fall. Super Impose charged home from last to win by a head, defeating 1991 Melbourne Cup champion Let's Elope.

The early to mid 1990s marked Freedman's most successful era as a trainer. In this time, he trained a number of outstanding gallopers, including sprinter Schillaci, quality mare Mannerism, Mahogany, who won Group One races from 1000m to 2500m, as well as Melbourne Cup winners Subzero (1992) and Doriemus, who won the Caulfield Cup – Melbourne Cup double in 1995. Freedman also won an unprecedented four consecutive Golden Slippers, Australia's premier Two Year Old race between 1993 and 1996, with Bint Marscay, Danzero, Flying Spur, and Merlene. During this time, the combination between Freedman and stable jockey, Damien Oliver was the best known and most successful in the country.

== Controversy ==
In this time Freedman was not immune from controversy. In March 1995 he was found guilty of substituting a horse in a barrier trial. To gain permission to run a horse, Central Express, in blinkers, it was necessary for it to run in a barrier trial, to demonstrate that the horse could properly run in them. Forced to run the trial the day before a race, Freedman substituted in another runner, Spanish Reign, for the trial. As such, Central Express ran in blinkers in the race, and duly won. Although Freedman said the substitution was for a good reason, not wanting to 'flatten' his horse before the race, he was suspended for four months. In this period, his brother Richard took over as trainer.

Another scandal to hit Freedman involved his outstanding three-year-old, Encosta De Lago, before the Bill Stutt Stakes at Moonee Valley in September 1996. The colt returned a test over the legal limit to the performance-enhancing substance TC02, or bicarbonate. A second test confirmed the result, however a third was ordered, which was also over the legal limit, but within the accepted margin of error. Encosta De Lago was allowed to run, and won the race. Although no action was taken against Freedman, it would be a significant distraction to the stable.

== Setbacks and resurgence ==
The Encosta De Lago affair happened to coincide with a decline in the stable's fortunes, although the main reason is more likely the unsuccessful move to Caulfield Racecourse, from Flemington. Between the 1997–98 and 2002–03 seasons, Freedman trained only fifteen Group One winners. Although by many measures this would be regarded as successful, it was an extremely poor run compared with mid-1990s, where in 1995–96 alone, Freedman trained 13 Group One winners.

After the 2000 Melbourne Cup Carnival, during which the stable won only one listed race, Freedman decided to radically change his training set-up. Lee's brother Richard purchased a large piece of land, near Rye, on Victoria's Mornington Peninsula. This was named Markdel, after Freedman's older brother Mark, and mother Del. It is a state-of-the-art private training facility.

This resurgence has been best symbolised by outstanding fillies Alinghi and Special Harmony, classy stayer Mummify, and champion mare Makybe Diva. In 2003 Lee Freedman joined the ranks of Australia's all-time greats when he was inducted into the Australian Racing Hall of Fame.

Mummify was one Freedman's favourite horses. Unfashionably bred, he managed to win a South Australian Derby as a three-year-old, but his effort to win the Caulfield Cup in 2003, leading all the way, was by far his greatest. Mummify's other significant wins were in the 2004 Yalumba Stakes, and 2005 Singapore Airlines International Cup. Mummify was killed in the 2005 Caulfield Cup, when he broke a bone in his leg, and was euthanised.

Freedman took over the training of Makybe Diva in 2004, after David Hall left to take up a position in Hong Kong. Freedman took an already Melbourne Cup winner and emerging superstar, winning a BMW, an Australian Cup and a Cox Plate with her. Freedman's greatest training achievement is winning the 2004 and 2005 Melbourne Cups with 'The Diva', taking her to a total of three wins in the Cup, which has never been done in more than 150 years of the race. Makybe Diva was retired after winning her third Melbourne Cup in November 2005.

During the 2000s Freedman was regarded as Victoria's premier horse trainer, and along with Bart Cummings, Gai Waterhouse, David A. Hayes and John Hawkes, among Australia's best.

In the 2006–07 season, the Freedman-trained sprinter Miss Andretti won four G1 races (the Manikato, Lightning and Australia Stakes and the Newmarket Handicap) and placed in two others. In June 2007, Miss Andretti won the G2 King's Stand Stakes at Royal Ascot, in course record time.

Following a decline in success for Freedman Brothers, Lee Freedman retired from training in August 2011. He later admitted the strain of failure heavily impacted his personal life. Lee's brothers Anthony and Michael took over training duties at Markdel. Over the ensuing three years, Freedman held various positions in the racing industry including director of racing for Lloyd Williams's Macedon Lodge, a training partnership with Sydney-based Graeme Rogerson and an advisor to Sir Peter Vela's Pencarrow Stud in New Zealand. During this period, Michael Freedman moved to Singapore and Anthony departed Markdel, transferring his training operation to Flemington.

In November 2014, Freedman announced he was returning to training, in partnership with Anthony, with stables at Flemington and Pinecliff, on the Mornington Peninsula. The pair's most successful horses in this period were sprinters Shoals and Santa Ana Lane. In the 2017–18 season, Shoals won three Group 1 races including the Myer Classic in Victoria and the Surround Stakes in Sydney. Santa Ana Lane won five Group 1 races, including South Australia's premier race The Goodwood and Brisbane's premier sprint The Stradbroke Hcp within 3 weeks of each other in 2018.

In mid-2017 Freedman moved to Singapore to train horses there, taking over the stables of New Zealand-born Laurie Laxon. Lee trained the winner of the 2018 Group 1 Singapore Guineas, Mr. Clint.

Partly due to COVID-19 and its effects on Singapore racing, Freedman announced his plan to return to Australia in late 2020. He will be based at the Gold Coast.

Freedman has two daughters, Emma and Georgia, with his ex-wife Janelle. Emma is a radio and television presenter.
