= Belmont Park Racecourse =

Horse racing venue in Perth, Western Australia

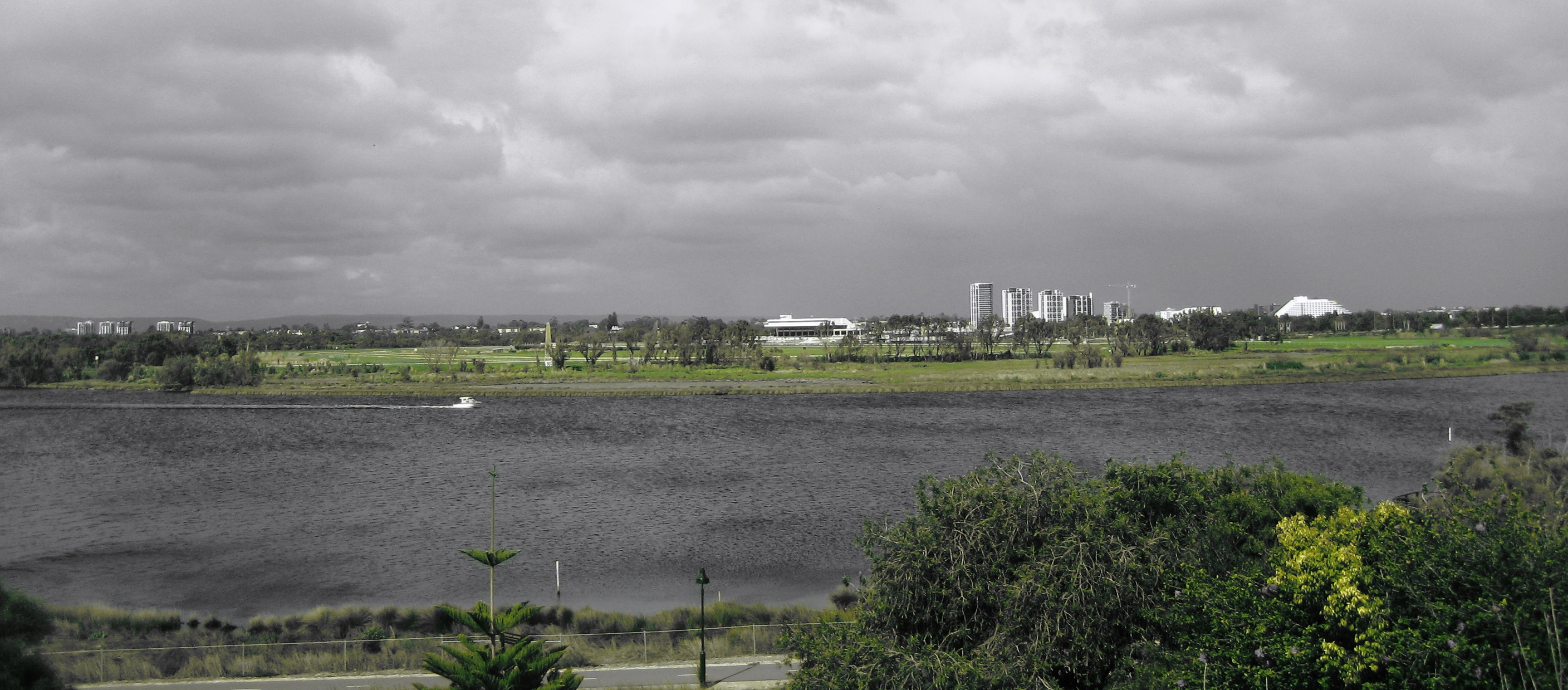
- Belmont Race course (taken from across the Swan River)
- Interactive map of Belmont Park Racecourse
- Location: Burswood, Western Australia
- Coordinates: 31°56′37″S 115°53′28″E
- Operated by: Perth Racing
- Screened on: Seven Network
- Race type: Flat
- Course type: Stadium
- Notable races: Roma Cup; Belmont Sprint; Hyperion Stakes; Strickland Stakes

Belmont Park Racecourse is one of the two major horse racing venues within the Perth, Western Australia metropolitan area, the other being Ascot Racecourse, and is located just outside of the central business district on the Burswood Peninsula surrounded by the Swan River. The track has a circumference of 1,699 metres (5,574 ft) with a 333-metre (1,093 ft) straight. Belmont is Perth's winter racecourse, with fully enclosed facilities for spectators.

On 24 December 1910 Belmont Park held its first harness race meeting, conducted by the Western Australian Trotting Association (WATA). The WATA continued to conduct race meetings on a fortnightly basis, using both Belmont Park and the Claremont Showground as venues, until the harness racing commenced on the WACA Ground track, on 28 June 1913.

In January 1911 the first aeroplane flight in Western Australia was conducted from the Belmont Park Racecourse. The racecourse served as Perth's first regular landing area until a more suitable site was found at Langley Park in 1919.

== Races ==
The following is a list of Group races which are run at Belmont Park Racecourse.

Group	Race name	Age	Sex	Weight	Distance	Date
3	Roma Cup	Open	Open	wfa	1200	May/June
3	Belmont Sprint	3yo+	Open	hcp	1400	May
3	Hyperion Stakes	3yo+	Open	wfa	1600	June
3	Strickland Stakes	3yo+	Open	wfa	2000	June
