= Horse racing in New Zealand =

Horse racing in New Zealand consists of two forms:

- Thoroughbred racing where the horse is ridden by a jockey
- Harness or standardbred racing where the horse is driven from a cart called a sulky

Harness racing is sometimes referred to as "trotting" in New Zealand, although there are actually two types of standardbred races based on the type of gait or running style: trotting, where the horse moves its two diagonally opposite legs forward at the same time, and pacing, where the two legs on the same side of the horse move forward at the same time.

The majority of standardbred races in New Zealand are pacing.

== Famous New Zealand thoroughbred racehorses ==
Notable Thoroughbred racehorses from New Zealand include:

- Phar Lap, the greatest Australian racehorse
- Sunline, the best racemare in New Zealand
- Nightmarch, the first horse to win the Melbourne Cup and Cox Plate in the same year
- Rising Fast, the only winner of the Spring Grand Slam
- Tulloch, the greatest Australian stayer
- Carbine, the winner of 30 principal races
- Desert Gold, the winner of 36 races during WW1
- Il Tempo, the greatest New Zealand stayer
- Grey Way, who defeated every champion in New Zealand and broke an Australasian record
- Horlicks, winner of the Japan Cup in world record time
- Balmerino, a champion international racehorse

== Famous New Zealand harness racers ==
The most famous Standardbred from New Zealand is the pacer Cardigan Bay. Stanley Dancer drove Cardigan Bay to $1 million in winnings in 1968, the first harness horse to surpass that milestone in American history. Dancer and Cardigan Bay appeared together on The Ed Sullivan Show.

Other top Standardbred horses include:

- Robalan
- Young Quinn
- Christian Cullen
- Lyell Creek
- Lazarus

== See also ==
- Thoroughbred racing in New Zealand
- Harness racing in New Zealand
- New Zealand Racing Hall of Fame
- New Zealand Horse of the Year
- Glossary of Australian and New Zealand punting
