= Glossary of Australian and New Zealand punting =

The Australian and New Zealand punting glossary explains some of the terms, jargon and slang which are commonly used and heard on Australian and New Zealand racecourses, in TABs, on radio, and in the horse racing media. Some terms are peculiar to Australia, such as references to bookmakers, but most are used in both countries.

The emphasis in this list is on gambling terms, rather than the breeding or veterinary side of horse racing.

== 0-9 ==
- 750s: Binoculars with magnification of 7x50 mm.
- 10-50s: Binoculars with magnification of 10x50 mm.

== A ==
- Acceptor: A horse confirmed by the owner or trainer to be a runner in a race.
- Aged: A horse seven years old or older.
- All up: A type of bet where the winnings of one race is carried over to the next race and so forth.
- Any2: see Duet.
- Apprentice: A young jockey, usually under 21 years of age, who is still in training. Recent rule changes allow older riders just starting out to work their way through their "apprenticeship".
- Apprentice allowance: Reduction in the weight to be carried by a horse which is to be ridden by an apprentice jockey. Also called a "claim". It varies from 4 kg to 1.5 kg depending on the number of winners the apprentice has ridden. Recent rule changes have resulted in an increase in the maximum amount able to be claimed—from 3 kg to 4 kg.
- Approximates: The TAB prices horses are showing before a race begins.
- Asparagus: Name given to a punter who arrives on course with a stack of 'mail', hence: more tips than a tin of asparagus.

== B ==
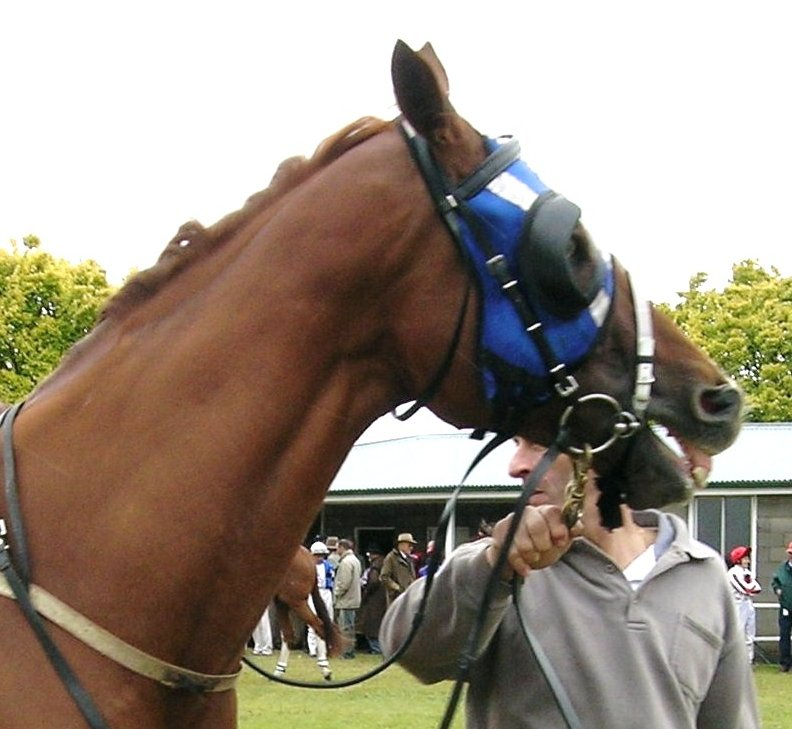
Blinkers

- B.: An abbreviation for a bay horse as it appears in race books, pedigrees and stud books.
- Back: To bet on a horse.
- Backed in: A horse whose odds have shortened.
- Backed off the map: A horse which has been heavily supported resulting in a substantial decrease in odds.
- Back up: To race a horse soon after its latest engagement. Also, punters who keep backing a particular horse are said to "back up."
- Bagman: Bookmaker's employee responsible for settling bets on course.
- Bank teller job: A horse considered such a near certainty that a bank teller could invest ‘borrowed’ bank funds and replace them without detection.
- Banker: A key selection in an exotic bet which must win, or run a particular place to guarantee any return.
- Banker: see Dead cert.
- Barriers: Starting barrier used to keep horses in line before the start of a race. Each horse has a stall or place randomly allocated in the barrier draw for the race.
- Battler: A trainer, jockey or bookmaker who just manages to make a living from his full-time involvement in horse racing.
- Benchmark: Under this system, operating in New South Wales, the weight a horse carries at its next start is determined immediately after its previous race, according to the merit of that run. Each benchmark point equals half a kilogram.
- Best bet: The selection that racing journalists and tipsters nominate as their strongest selection of the day. In the UK, it is known as the nap.
- Bet back: Action taken by a bookmaker when they are heavily committed to a horse and spreads some of the risk by investing with other bookies or the totalisator.
- Bet until your nose bleeds: Confident instructions to a commission agent or advice to a punter indicating that the horse is so certain to win that betting should only be halted in the unlikely event of a nosebleed.
- Better than bank interest: Justification by a punter for backing a horse that is very short odds on.
- Betting exchange: Internet-based organisations which broker bets between punters for a commission. The largest is Betfair.
- Big bickies: A large amount of money.
- Big note: To skite or exaggerate a position or status – to "big note" oneself.
- Big Red: Nickname of the champion race horse Phar Lap.
- **Binos** (pronounced "by-nose"): Binoculars.
- Birdcage: Area where horses are paraded before entering the racetrack.
- Bite: To ask someone for a loan.
- Bl.: An abbreviation for a black horse, as it appears in race books, pedigrees and stud books.
- Black type: Thoroughbred sales catalogues use boldface type to highlight horses that have won or placed in a stakes race.
- Bleeder: A horse that bleeds from the lungs during or after a race or workout. In Australia, a first-time bleeder is banned from racing for three months. If it bleeds a second time, the horse is banned for life.
- Blew like a north wind: Said about a horse whose odds have lengthened dramatically during the course of betting.
- Blinkers: A cup-shaped device used to limit a horse's vision during a race and improve concentration.
- Bloused: To be caught on the line or defeated in a photo finish.
- Blow: When the odds of a horse increase during betting.
- Blown out the gate: Odds have extended dramatically due to lack of support.
- Boat race: A race with a number of non-triers which is said to be fixed for one horse to win.
- Bolter: A horse at long odds.
- Bowling: When a syndicate of punters (usually professional gambler/s) uses a number of unidentified people ("bowlers") to simultaneously place bets on a specific race at numerous locations.
- Box: Betting term denoting an exotic combination bet whereby all possible numeric outcomes are covered.
- Box seat: A position in a race which is one horse off the fence and one horse behind the leaders.
- Bridle: A piece of equipment, usually made of leather or nylon, which fits on a horse's head and includes a bit and the reins.
- Br.: An abbreviation for a brown horse, as it appears in race books, pedigrees and stud books.
- Breaking: Breaking into a gallop, when trotting horses start galloping.
- Bred: A horse is bred where it is foaled. Thus a foal conceived in New Zealand but foaled in Australian is regarded as being bred in Australia.
- Breeder: A breeder of a foal is the owner of its dam when it is foaled. The breeder may not have had anything to do with the mating of the mare or the place where it is foaled.
- Bring a duffel bag: Term used by a punter who expects to take copious amounts of cash home from the track.
- Broodmare: A filly or mare that has been bred and is used to produce foals.
- Buying money: Term used by a punter when required to bet 'odds on'.

== C ==
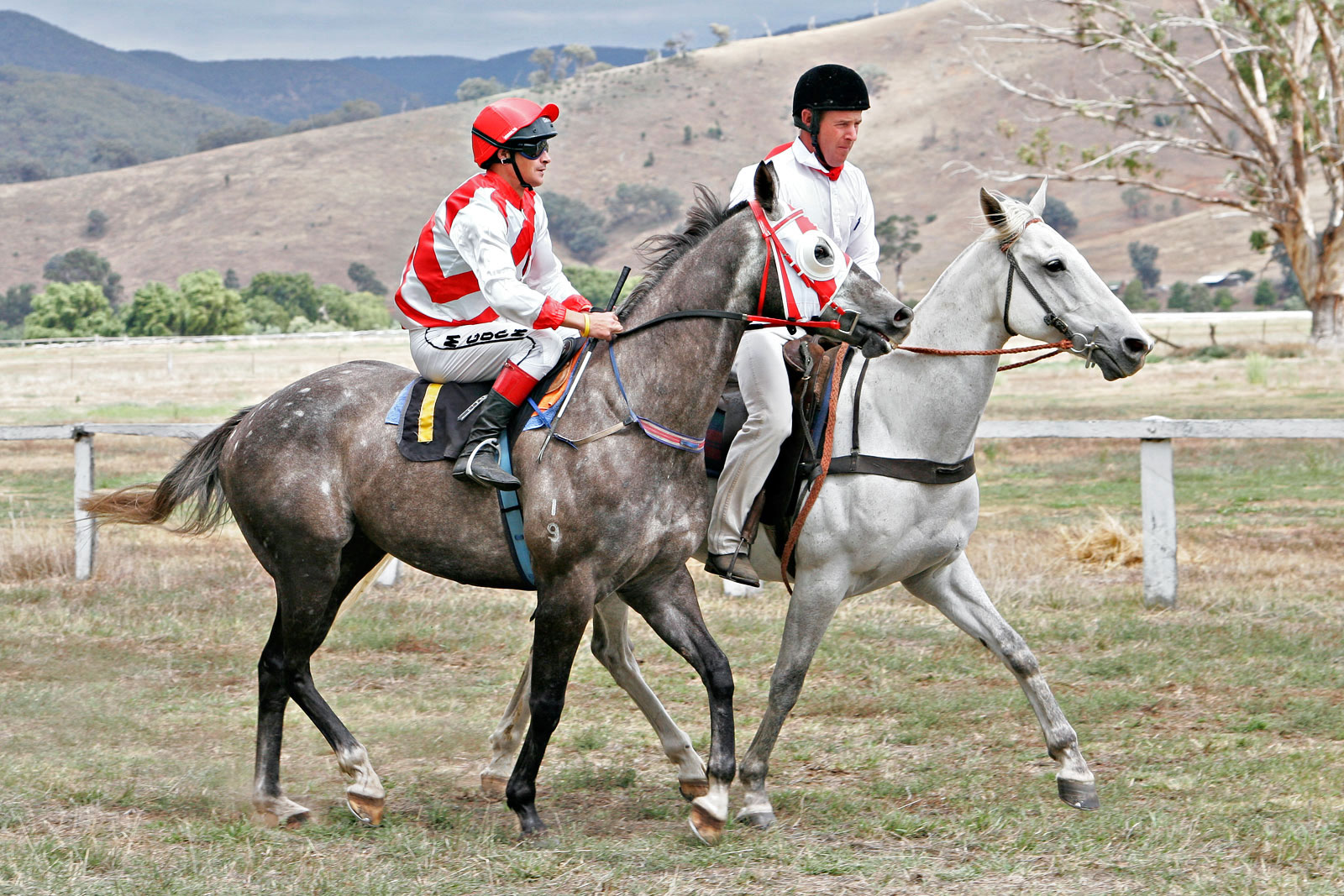
A clerk of the course with a race starter.

- C: The class of a harness racehorse which stands for Country Assessment; M stands for Metropolitan Assessment. A C11 M6 pacer has won an equivalent of 11 country class races and 6 metropolitan class races.
- C.: An abbreviation for a colt, as it appears in race books, pedigrees and stud books.
- Calcutta: Sweepstakes conducted prior to a big event with each horse being raffled and then auctioned to the highest bidder.
- Carry the grandstand: Said of a horse allocated a big weight in a handicap race.
- Cast: A horse situated on its side or back, and wedged in the starting stalls, such that it cannot get up.
- Cast a plate: Lost a racing plate.
- Ch.: An abbreviation for a chestnut horse, as it appears in race books, pedigrees and stud books.
- Chaff bandit: a derogatory term for a horse with little hope of winning; as in "stealing" its food.
- Chaff burner: Derogatory term for a horse.
- Checked: Incident during a race when a horse is blocked, causing it to change stride, slow down or change direction.
- Claim: see Apprentice allowance.
- Clerk of the course: Mounted racecourse officials who manage horses and jockeys on the race track, and lead the winner of a race back to the mounting yard.
- Coat-tugger: A racecourse conman who will tip a horse to a punter, and if the horse wins, is always present when the punter collects, to demand a portion of the winnings.
- Colourful racing identity: Euphemism for a criminal.
- Colours: Coloured racing jacket and cap worn by jockeys to indicate the owners of a horse.
- Colt: An entire (ungelded) male under four years of age.
- Connections: The owners and trainer of a horse.
- Cop a minty wrapper: To receive a very light "sling" or gratuity.
- Correct weight: After a race, the weight carried by at least the placegetters is checked, and 'correct weight' is the signal by the stewards that bets can be paid.
- Could not lay it with a trowel: Said by bookmakers of a horse that has been completely neglected in the betting ring.
- Cricket score odds: Very long odds, usually 100 to 1 or better.
- Crucified: see Slaughtered.
- Crusher: A bookmaker who takes top odds from his colleagues and then offers prices on the same horse or horses at reduced odds.
- Cuts his own hair: An expression to indicate a person is very careful about investing any money.

== D ==
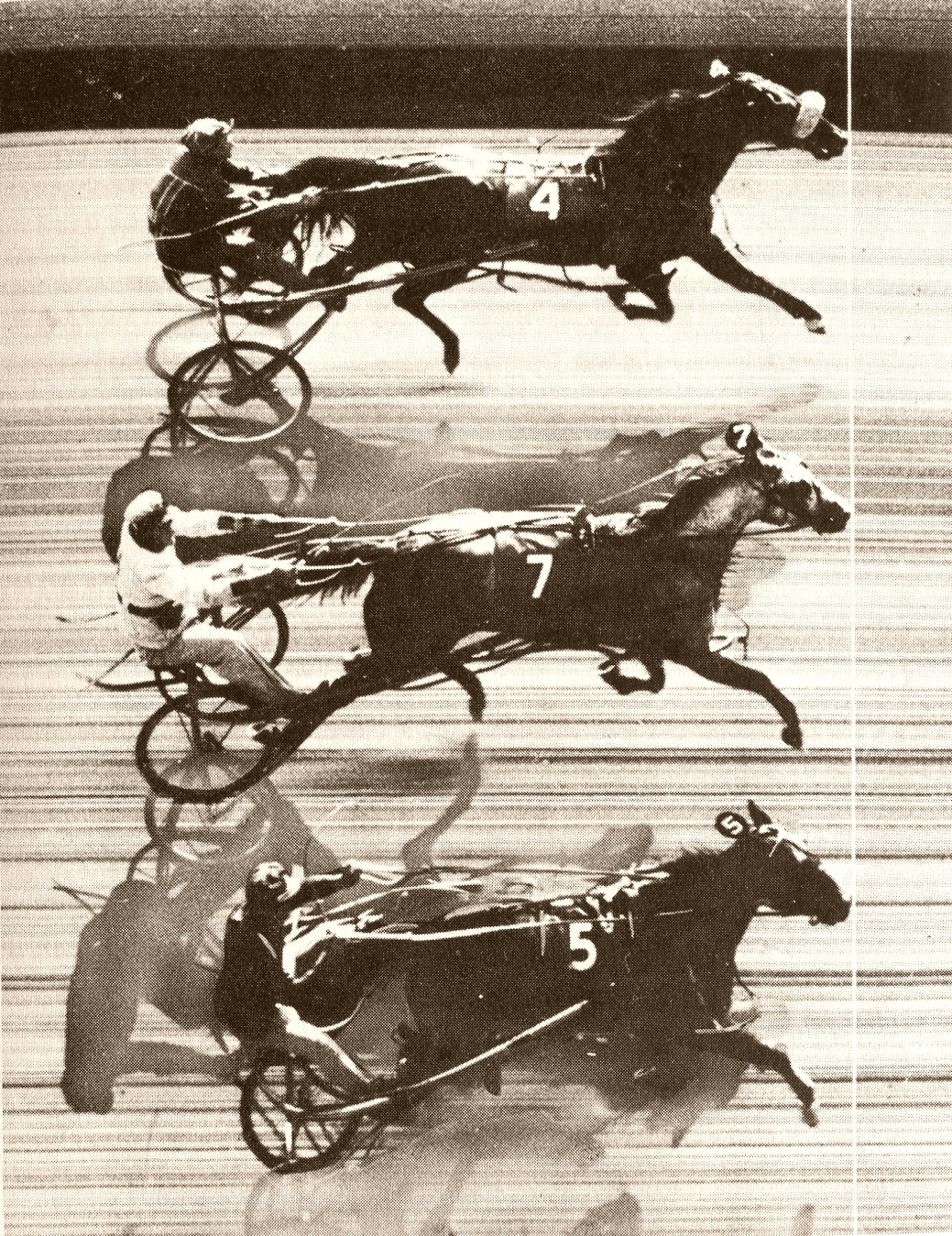
A photo finish record of the first triple dead heat in harness racing.

- Daily double: Type of wager calling for the selection of winners of two nominated races.
- Dam: The mother of a horse.
- Daylight: Often called as second placegetter in a race where the winner has won by a wide margin.
- Dead cert: Dead certainty, a horse or team that is considered highly likely to win.
- Dead heat: A tie between two or, rarely, more horses for a win or place in a race.
- Dead 'un: A horse deliberately ridden to lose.
- Deductions: The percentage reduction in odds, for win and place bets, when a horse is scratched from a race after betting on that race has commenced.
- Derby: A stakes event for three-year-olds.
- Desperate: A hopeless gambler; one who has no control over their tendency to bet.
- Dip: A pickpocket on a racecourse; someone with light fingers.
- Dishlickers: A colloquial term for greyhound racing.
- Dogs are barking it: A big tip which has become common knowledge.
- Doing plenty: Having a rough trot on the punt.
- Donkey-licked: To be defeated convincingly.
- Double carpet: 33/1 outsider.
- Drift: When the odds of a horse increase or ease.
- Drift in: A horse moving from a straight path towards the rail during a race.
- Drongo: A horse or person who was disappointing, slow or clumsy.
- Drum: Good information, a tip.
- Drum: To be placed second or third in a race; to run "the drum."
- Dutch book: To bet on a number of horses, at varying odds, such that whichever bet wins, a set profit is guaranteed.
- Duet: Exotic bet to select two of the three placegetters in a race.
- Duffer in the wet: Does not run well on slow or heavy tracks.

== E ==
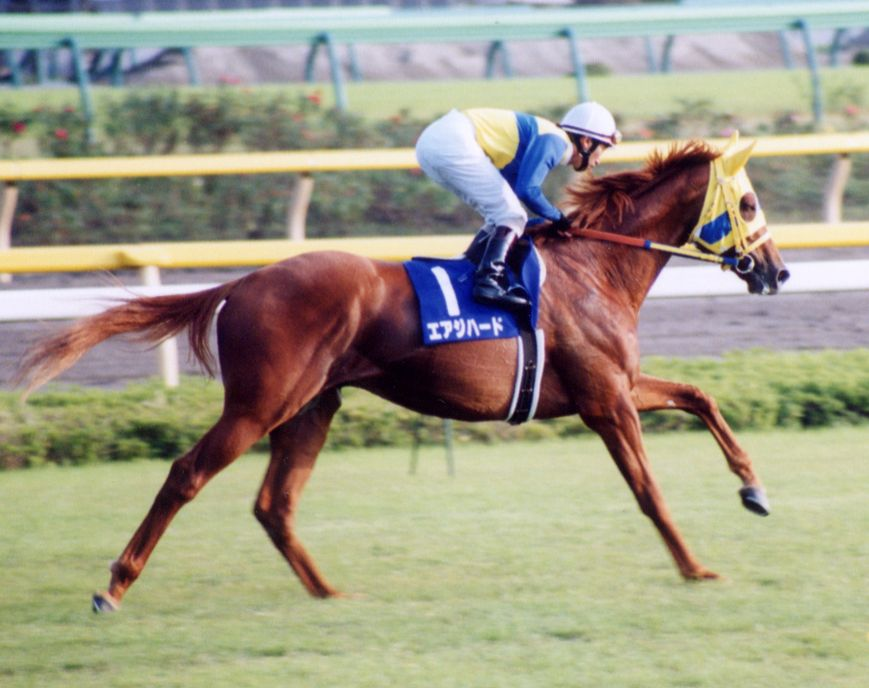
Ear muffs

- Each way: To bet for a win and a place.
- Early crow: When someone, usually a race caller, calls the winner of a race prematurely and incorrectly.
- Educated money: An amount invested on a horse from a stable or informed source.
- Emergencies: Substitutes, or replacements, for horses which are scratched from a race which is limited to a number of starters. The 'emergency starters' are drawn up by ballot or lottery to take the place of any runner that is withdrawn.
- Emu: A person who picks up discarded betting tickets on a racecourse, hoping that some will be of value. The person strikes a similar pose to Australia's largest native bird when feeding.
- Entire: Any male horse with both testicles in the scrotum.
- Equipment: Includes regular tack and gear which must be approved. See Gear changes.
- Even money: Odds of 1–1. A total return of $2 for a $1 outlay.
- Exacta: Exotic bet to select the first two finishers in a race in the exact order of finish.
- Exotics: Any bet other than a win or place e.g. quinella, trifecta, quadrella, superfecta, treble, exacta.

== F ==
- f.: An abbreviation for a filly, as it appears in race books, pedigrees and stud books.
- Facing the breeze: Horse on the outside that can't get past the leader in trotting races.
- Failed to give a yelp: Said of a horse that, although expected to go well, runs down the track.
- Farrier: A person who shoes the horses.
- Favourite: The horse which is quoted at the shortest odds in a race.
- Field bet: To incorporate all of the runners in a race in one combination of an exotic bet.
- Filly: A female thoroughbred less than four years of age.
- Firm: To shorten in the betting, generally because of the weight of money being invested.
- First four: An exotic type of wager picking the first four finishers in exact sequence, known as a superfecta in the US.
- First up: The first run of a horse in a new preparation.
- Flip of the coin: The odds available are quoted at even money.
- Flying handicap: A sprint race generally of less than 1200 metres.
- Foot on the till: Expression indicating that a horse is ready to win.
- Form: A horse's record of past performances.
- Fractions: The cents left over after TAB dividends are rounded down to the lower 10 cents.
- Front-runner: A horse that performs best when allowed to run along at the head of the field.
- Furlong: An eighth of a mile (220 yards).

== G ==
- Gear changes: Modifications to horses that are authorised by stewards and appear in form guides and race books. Gear falling into this category includes: Blinkers, pacifiers, winkers, visors, cheekers, Cornell Collars, ear muffs, nose bands, nose rolls, various bits, tail chain, tongue tie, various plates and shoes for racing. Prior to racing: barrier blankets, stallion chains and blindfolds. Gelding of entire males is also to be notified.
- Gelding: A male horse that has been castrated.
- Get on: Have your bet accepted.
- Get-out stakes: The last event on any racing programme.
- Get up: To win.
- Getting set: Being accommodated for a wager.
- Getting up without names: An indication that a number of long shots have won races, hence: "They're getting up without names today."
- Girth: An elastic and leather band sometimes covered with sheepskin, that passes under a horse's belly and is connected to both sides of the saddle.
- Going: The surface condition of the racecourse (firm, good, soft, or heavy). Since 1 December 2014, all Australian tracks are rated numerically alongside their description; an ideal track may be a "good 3", whereas an extremely poor track would be described as a "heavy 10".
- Good alley: A barrier draw considered to be ideal for a particular horse.
- Good oil: Positive information about a horse's chances in a race.
- Gorilla: A colloquial term for one thousand dollars.
- Got at: A horse is said to have been got at when it was by any means been put in such a condition that it cannot win.
- Got the blows: Drifted in the betting.
- Gr.: An abbreviation for a grey horse, as it appears in race books, pedigrees and stud books.
- Greet the judge: To win a race.
- Group race: High quality race categorised into Group One (G1), 2 and 3 and Listed races, in order of importance.
- Grow another leg: Said of horses that handle wet tracks well.

== H ==
- h.: An abbreviation for a horse (stallion), as it appears in race books, pedigrees and stud books.
- Had something on the winner: Understatement of a punter who may have bankrupted a couple of bookies.
- Hairy-goat: A racehorse that has performed badly.
- Half-brother, half-sister: Horses out of the same dam but by different sires. It does not apply to horses by the same sire.
- Ham: Term used for a horse that has been in a good paddock/looks a little large around the edges, as in "what a ham!"
- Hand: Unit of measure (equals 4 inches) of a horse's height. Thoroughbreds typically range from 15 to 17 hands. The measurement is taken from the ground to the horse's withers – the point where the neck meets the back.
- Handicap: A class of race for which the official handicapper assigns the weight each horse has to carry.
- Handicapper: The racing official who assigns the weights to be carried by horses in handicap races.
- Hang: To veer away from a straight course during a race.
- Hard-earned: Money.
- Head: A margin between horses. One horse leading another by the length of his head.
- Headquarters: Randwick Racerouse. In Victoria, Flemington Racecourse is known as headquarters.
- The Heath: The nickname for Caulfield Racecourse.
- Hold all tickets: Announcement by the stewards that no bets can be settled until certain aspects of the race have been investigated.
- Hoop: Jockey.
- Horse: An entire male horse of four years of age or more.
- Hot pot: The race favourite.

== I ==
- Imports: Horses imported to Australia are indicated by an abbreviation the country of their birth, such as New Zealand (NZ) and United States (USA). An * (asterisk) suffix may also be used to denote horses imported from England or Ireland to Australia or New Zealand.
- Impost: The weight a horse is allocated or carries.
- In the red: The price of a horse when it is odds on. The bookmakers' boards display 'odds on' in red to distinguish from odds against.
- Inquiry: An investigation into the running of the race. Can result in demotion of one or more horses in the finish order.
- Irons: Stirrups.

== J ==
- Jackpot: Monies carried over to the next suitable race or meeting. This occurs in exotic bet types such as quadrellas and first fours when no investor selects the winning combination.
- Jigger: An illegal battery powered device used by a jockey to stimulate a horse during a race or track work.
- Jumped out of the ground: Said of a horse which comes from nowhere at the end of the race.
- Jumped out of trees: Said by bookmakers of a rush of punters to plunge on a horse.
- Just about square: Punters expression for when they have almost won back the money they have lost earlier in the day.

== K ==
- Knocktaker: An absolute certainty; a moral.
- Knuckled over: To stumble away from the starting stalls, usually caused by the track surface breaking away from under a horse's hooves, causing it to duck its head or nearly go to its knees.

== L ==
- Lacks ticker: Deficient in the heart department (i.e. courage).
- Late mail: Final thoughts and selections of tipsters allowing for things like scratchings, jockey changes and on-course information.
- Lay: When a bookmaker takes a risk and increases the odds of a particular horse to entice investors because the bookmaker truly believes that horse has no chance of winning the race.
- Lay down misere: An absolute certainty.
- Lay of the day: A fancied horse considered by a bookmaker to be the one about which he will take the biggest risk.
- Lay off: Bets made by one bookmaker with another bookmaker or the tote, in an effort to reduce his liability in respect of bets already laid by him with investors.
- Lay in/out: When a horse directs its head and attempts to move its body towards or away from the rail.
- Left it in the bag: An unsuccessful betting plunge which results in the money remaining in the bookmaker's bag.
- Length: A length. The length of a horse from nose to tail. Used to describe the distance between horses in a race. Equal to 0.17 seconds.
- Let down: A jockey is said to let down his horse in the final stages of a race when asking it for its final effort.
- London to a brick on: Long odds-on.
- Long shot: An outsider at long odds with little chance of winning.
- Lost a leg in the float: The horse has drifted alarmingly in the betting.
- Low flying: A horse travelling so fast it is said to be "low flying" rather than running.
- Lug: Racing erratically and hanging in.

== M ==
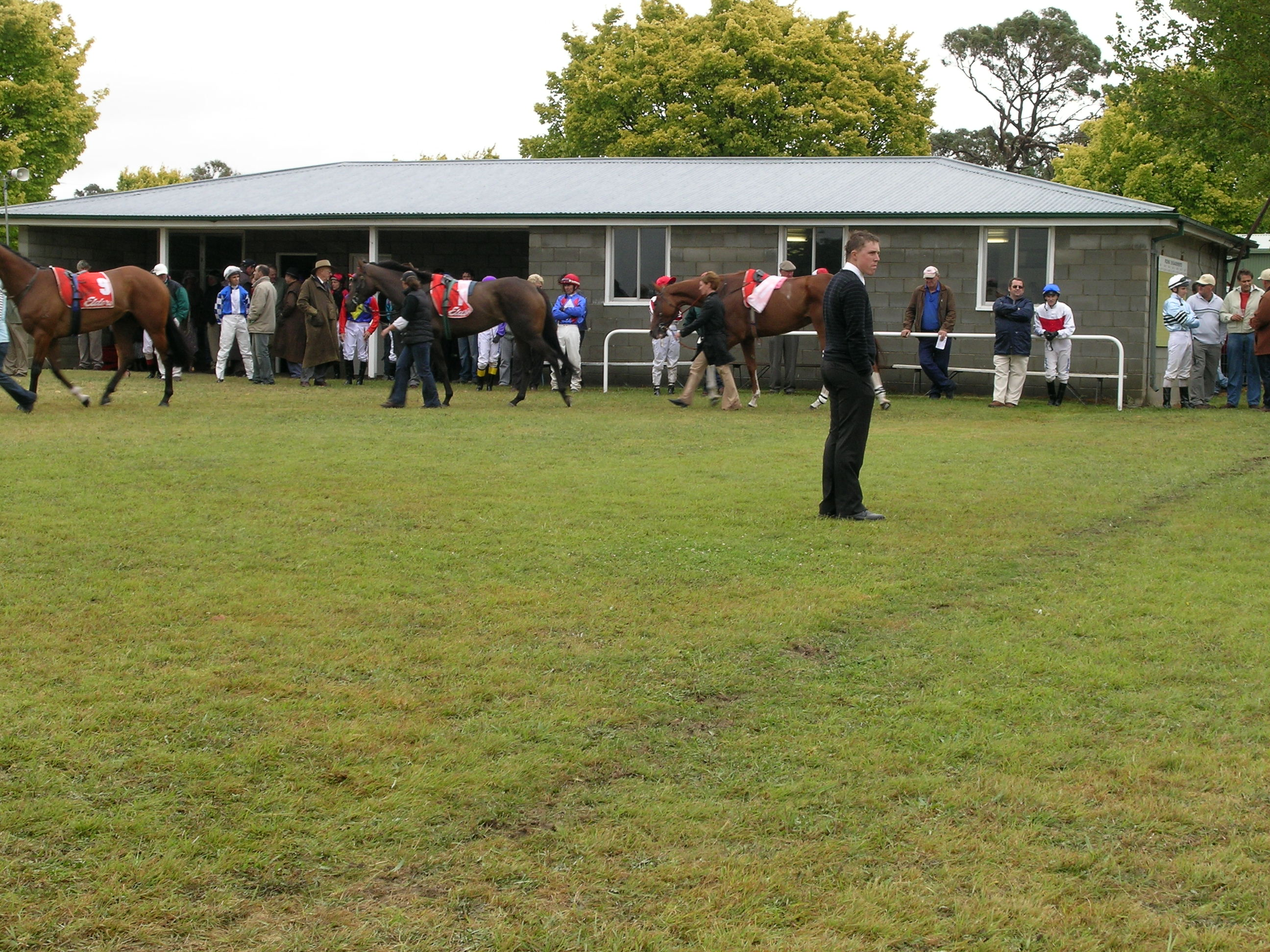
A mounting yard at a country race meeting.

- M: The class of a harness racehorse which stands for Metropolitan Assessment. A C11 M6 pacer has won an equivalent of 11 country class races and 6 metropolitan class races.
- m.: An abbreviation for a mare, as it appears in race books, pedigrees and stud books etc.
- Maiden: A horse that has not won a race.
- Mail: Information and tips.
- Mare: A female horse over three years old.
- Market: The list of all horses engaged in a race and their respective odds.
- Mentor: The trainer of a horse.
- Monkey: A term used for five hundred dollars.
- Moral: An absolute certainty.
- Mounting yard: Enclosure where the horses are paraded prior to each race and jockeys mount and dismount their horses.
- Muck lather: Term for a horse sweating profusely, usually brought on by nervousness prior to a race.
- Mudlark: A horse which goes well on a wet track.
- Multi bet: A type of bet which allows you to automatically place the winnings from the previous bet(s) onto the following bet(s).

== N ==
- Nags: Derogatory term for horse racing.
- Near side: Left hand side of a horse. The side on which a horse is normally mounted.
- Neck: A win or place margin, which in racing is about the length of a horse's neck.
- Neglected: Attracting very little support in the betting.
- Nose: The short winning margin in an Australian horse race, followed by a short half-head.
- Nose band: A leather strap that goes around a horse's nose to help keep the mouth shut.

== O ==
- Oaks: A stakes event for three-year-old fillies.
- Odds against: Odds which are longer than evens (e.g. 2–1). At present, Australian odds are expressed as a $ figure: 2–1 is now shown as $3 (2–1 plus the $1 stake).
- Odds on: Odds which are shorter than evens (e.g. 1–2 or 2–1 on). In Australia, this is more commonly displayed as $1.50, using the above example in odds against.
- Odds on look on: An old adage used by punters in which the decision is made not to bet on a race in which the favourite is at odds on.
- Off side: The right hand side of a horse.
- On-course tote: The totalisator which is situated at the race course.
- On the bit: When a horse is eager to run.
- On the nod: A betting transaction between a punter and bookmaker without money changing hands. A credit bet.
- On the nose: A bet placed on the win only
- One large: A term used for one thousand dollars.
- Ordinary cattle: A derogatory term for a low class field of runners.
- Outlay: The money an investor bets or wagers is called their outlay.
- Outsider: A horse whose chances of winning a race are not considered very strong. An outsider is usually quoted at the highest odds.
- Overs: Odds about a horse which are considered to be good value because they are longer than its estimated probability of winning.
- Overweight: Excess weight carried by a horse when the rider cannot make the allocated weight, including apprentice allowances.

== P ==
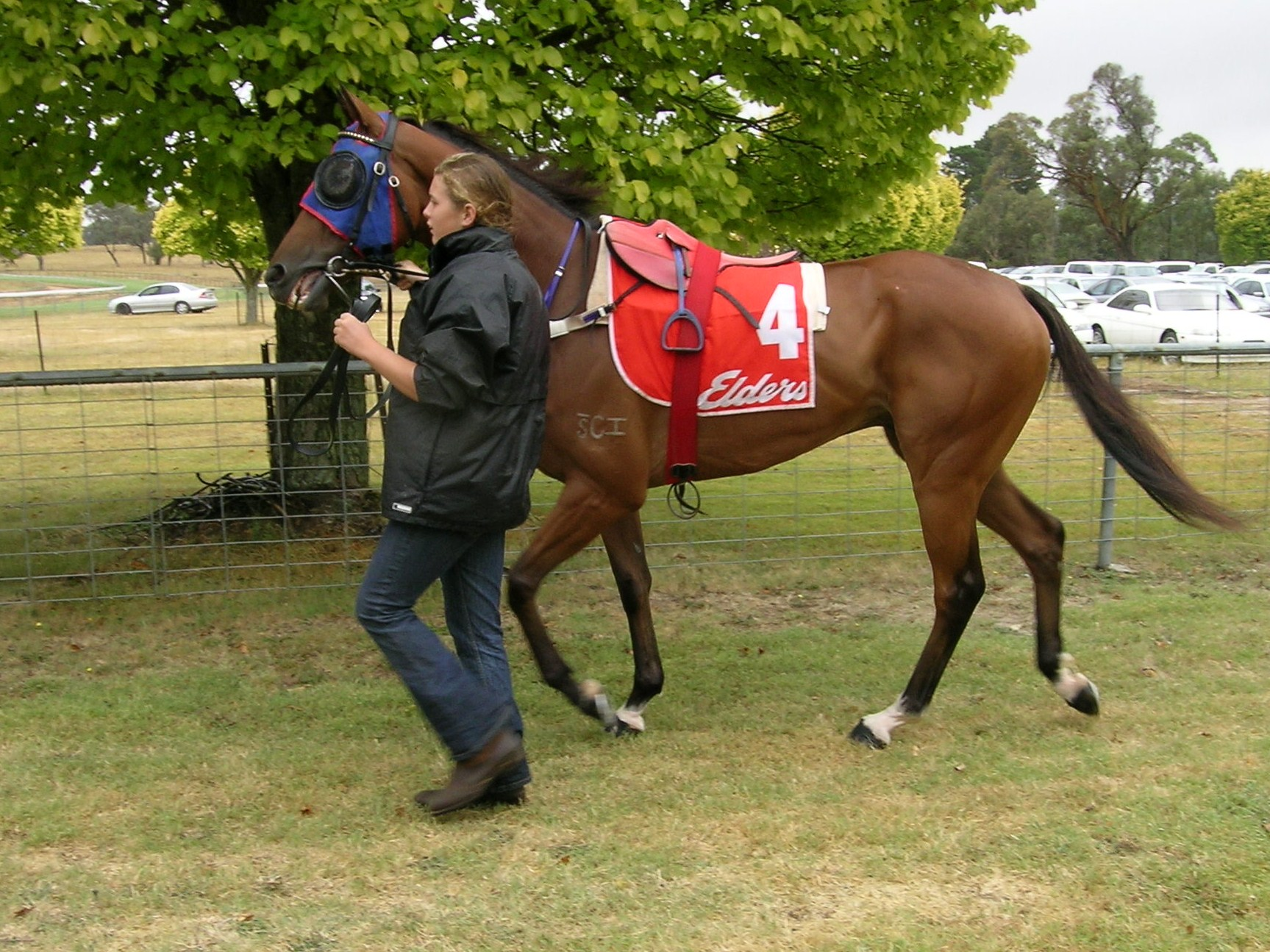
Pacifiers

- Pacifiers: Mesh eye-covers used to calm horses down. Racing stewards may restrict their use in wet weather for safety reasons, as mud can stick to them.
- Pay the grandstand: Often said of a likely exotic tote dividend when one or more outsiders win or run a place. "It will pay the grandstand."
- Penetrometer: A device used for measuring the hardness or softness of the track by measuring the extent to which the device penetrates the ground.
- Persuader: Colloquial term for a jockey's whip.
- Photo finish: Where the finish of the race is so close that a photograph has to be used to determine the eventual winner/placer.
- Pigskin: A jockey's saddle.
- Pig-root: Horse which bucks and tries to throw the rider.
- Pilot the field: To lead the race.
- Placed: Finished in the first three in a race.
- Place bet: A bet which will win if the selected horse finishes in the first three in fields of eight or more horses. If there are only six or seven runners, the horse must finish first or second to place.
- Plonk: A sizeable amount wagered on a horse. Not quite a plunge, but a "decent plonk" nevertheless.
- Plunge: In the bookmakers' ring, a massive and sudden support for a horse.
- Postilion: Jockey.
- Preliminary: The walk, canter or gallop by a horse on the way to the starting stalls.
- Pre-post odds: A horse's anticipated odds as printed in the morning newspapers.
- Price: The odds on offer about a horse.
- Prior convictions: A horse which has failed to perform to expectations on previous occasions.
- Protest: When a jockey, owner, trainer or steward alleges interference by one party against another during a race that may have affected the outcome of a race. If a protest is upheld by stewards, the runner that caused the interference is placed directly after the horse interfered with. If a protest is dismissed, the original result of the race stands.
- Pulled its head off: Said of a horse that would not settle, or over-raced.
- Pulling: Over-racing.
- Punt: To wager on the outcome of a race.
- Punter: Person making the wager.
- Put your house on: A good thing.

== Q ==
- Quadrella: A type of wager which requires the selection of winners of four nominated races. Also known as a 'quaddie'.
- Quality Handicap; Races which have a minimum weight of 53 kg and a maximum weight of 61 kg unless otherwise approved, plus minimum rates of prizemoney.
- Quinella: The bettor must pick the two runners which finish first and second, but need not specify which will finish first.

== R ==
- Racing plates: Aluminium horseshoes.
- Rails: The fence on the inside of a race track. Also, the prime position in a bookmakers' ring. Hence "rails bookmaker."
- Red-hots: The trots, or harness racing.
- Relegated: Horse is demoted in finish order due to an inquiry into the race.
- Result: In bookmaking, a "result" is a financial outcome of any race. It may be a "good result" or a "bad result."
- Ridden upside down: Not ridden in the usual manner. An example would be a normal frontrunner which is ridden back in the field.
- Rig: A male horse which is a cryptorchid or not properly castrated.
- Ring: An area on a racecourse where the bookmakers are positioned is always called a "ring", regardless of its shape.
- Ring-in: A horse in a race who has been substituted illegally for the correct entrant. The most infamous case was the Fine Cotton ring-in.
- Risky conveyance: A horse which has a record of not performing to expectations in previous races.
- Roughie: A horse at long odds which is considered to have only a remote chance of winning a race.
- Running double: Type of wager calling for the selection of winners of two consecutive races.

== S ==
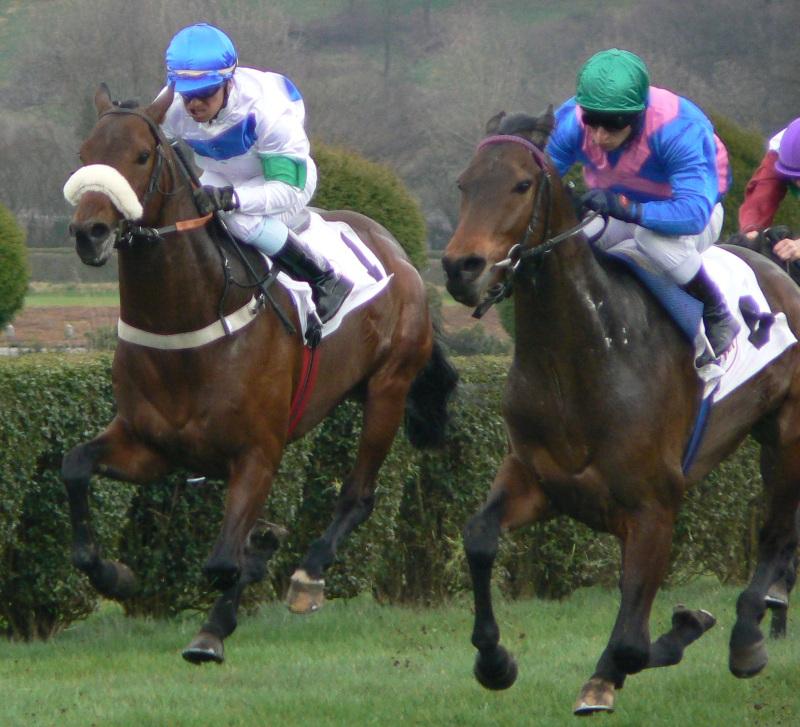
A (shadow) nose roll on the left horse.

- Saddlecloth: A cloth which goes under the saddle to identify the horse by number and, sometimes in major races, its name.
- Salute the judge: The horse wins the race.
- Satchel swinger: A bookmaker.
- Score up: In harness racing the movement of horses behind the mobile barrier before a start is made.
- Scraping paint: Racing tight, or close, to the running rail.
- Scratch: To be taken out of a race before it starts.
- Sectionals: Intermediate times recorded during a race.
- Set the board: When a bookmaker completes the information shown on the betting board, by listing each runner in a race and their respective odds, the bookmaker is said to have set the board.
- Settling: A meeting between bookmaker and punter at which money is exchanged in settlement for past credit betting. The majority of settling now takes place at the course prior to the race.
- Shadow roll: A wide lamb's wool covered noseband designed to keep the horse from seeing his own shadow.
- Shillelagh: Colloquial term for a jockey's whip.
- Shin sore: Inflammation of the membrane of the cannon bone.
- Short half-head: The second-smallest winning margin. In Australia, a nose is the shortest margin a horse can win by.
- Shorten: When the odds of a horse decrease, usually because a lot of money has been wagered on that horse.
- Shrapnel: The term used by a bookie's bagman for a heap of small coins.
- Silks: A jockey's breeches and bib or cravat
- Sire: The father of a horse.
- Skinner: A "result" for a bookmaker which entails very little, or no pay out whatsoever on a race.
- Slaughtered: Said of a jockey who has ridden a horse so badly as to be the main cause of it losing a race.
- Sling: A sum of money given as gratuity or bonus generally by an owner to a trainer, jockey or strapper.
- Smarty: A somewhat derogatory term for a person not to be trusted, especially with privileged stable information.
- Smoky: A well supported horse with no apparent form to justify its price.
- SP: An illegal "off-course" operator – a starting price bookmaker. The term SP is also used by racing officials to declare the official starting price of a horse.
- Special: see Best bet.
- Speedy squib: A horse which has a reputation for beginning races extremely fast and running out of steam before the winning post.
- Spell: The resting period for a horse between preparations or racing.
- Spin: An expression for a five-pound note (pre-1966 currency).
- Spot: A term used for one hundred dollars.
- Spring Grand Slam: Informally describes the treble of the Caulfield Cup, Cox Plate and Melbourne Cup.
- Sprout wings: To accelerate surprisingly in the straight to defeat a leader who looked certain to win.
- Stake: The sums of money deposited or guaranteed by the parties to a bet.
- Stakes races: Group one, group two, group three or listed races.
- Stayer: A horse that specialises in longer distance races.
- Stewards: Officials who run the race meeting and are responsible for enforcing the Australian [and Local] Rules of racing.
- Stick: Jockey's whip.
- Sticks: Hurdles or fences in jumping races.
- Stipes: Another term for the stewards, or stipendiary stewards.
- Stirrups: Metal D-shaped rings into which a jockey places their feet. Also known as "irons".
- Stone motherless: Expression used to indicate that a horse is running a clear last in a race, or is tailed off at the finish.
- Stonebonker: A good thing in a race. A horse considered to be over the line.
- Straight out: Betting to win only.
- Strapper: The person who attends to, grooms, and usually leads the horse around the mounting yard.
- Superfecta: An exotic type of bet which requires a punter to select the first six horses to cross the finish line in the exact order. Only previously offered in New South Wales; now replaced by the First four. (Compare with the usual U.S. definition, which is similar to the Australian/New Zealand First Four.)
- Swimmer: Horse which performs very well on rain affected tracks.
- Swooper: A horse which charges home at the end of a race.

== T ==
- TAB: Totalisator Agency Board. The original state government body appointed to regulate off-course betting. Many of the state TABs have been privatised in recent years.
- Tabcorp: Australia's largest gambling and entertainment group. It was established in 1994 following the privatization of the Victorian TAB.
- Take the knock: Fail to honour betting debts. The punter concerned generally goes missing.
- Taken to the cleaners: An expression used by both bookmakers and punters when they have suffered a huge loss.
- Taking a set: When a bookmaker increases the odds of a favoured horse, which in their opinion can't win the race, in order to receive more bets.
- Three-quarter-brother (or sister): A term used for horses out of the same dam, but are by a sires that are half-brothers or who are by the same sire.
- Tomato sauce odds: Refers to an odds-on favourite in betting parlance. The phrase derives from the days of fractional odds when bookmakers used a red background on their boards to denote horses running 'odds on'. These days the phrase is used in general (and somewhat colloquial) horse racing vernacular, for example: "Those who took the tomato sauce odds were never in danger as she led throughout to defeat Splash of Paint and Amber Cash in 23.38".
- Ton: A term used for one hundred dollars.
- Tongue tie: A strap or piece of stocking used to tie down a horse's tongue to prevent it getting over the bit, which affects a horse's breathing and the jockey's control of the horse.
- Tote: TAB.
- Toppy: The top weight or horse carrying the No. 1 saddlecloth.
- Totalisator: An alternative form of betting to bookmakers or a betting exchange. All bets are placed into a pool, and dividends are paid by dividing the final pool by the amount invested on the winner, less a fixed percentage.
- Town: To race in 'town' means to race on metropolitan tracks in a capital city, as distinct from all other tracks which are collectively called 'the bush'.
- Track condition: See Going.
- Transfusion: An injection of cash.
- Travelling: A descriptive term to indicate current financial status. A bookmaker or punter might be "travelling well" or "not travelling all that well at the moment."
- Treble: An exotic bet consisting of selections in 3 separate races, all of which must win for the wager to be successful.
- Trifecta: An exotic type of wager picking the first three finishers in exact sequence.
- Triple Crown: A term for the three-year-old Randwick Guineas, Rosehill Guineas and the AJC Australian Derby.
- Trots: A term used for harness racing.
- Two-year-old Triple Crown (also known as the Two-year-old Grand Slam): Consists of the Golden Slipper Stakes, AJC Sires Produce Stakes and the Champagne Stakes.

== U ==
- Unbackable: A horse which is quoted at such extremely short odds that investors decide it is too short to return a reasonable profit for the risk involved.
- Under double wraps: An expression indicating that a horse won very easily without being fully extended.
- Unders: Odds about a horse which are considered to be bad value because they are shorter than its estimated winning probability.
- Undertaker: A bookmaker said to only be interested in laying "dead 'uns".
- Urger: See Coat-tugger.

== V ==
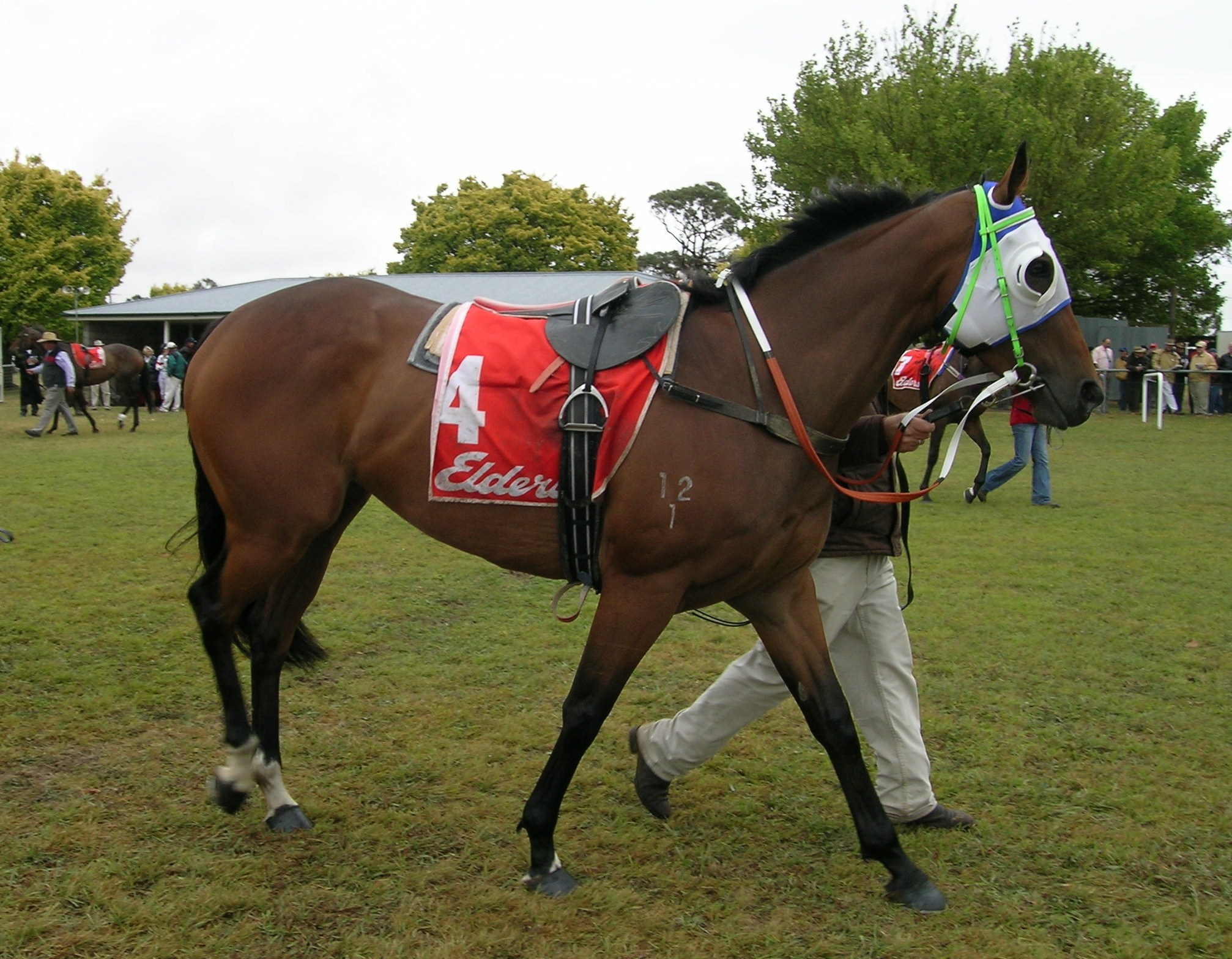
Visor blinkers (click to enlarge)

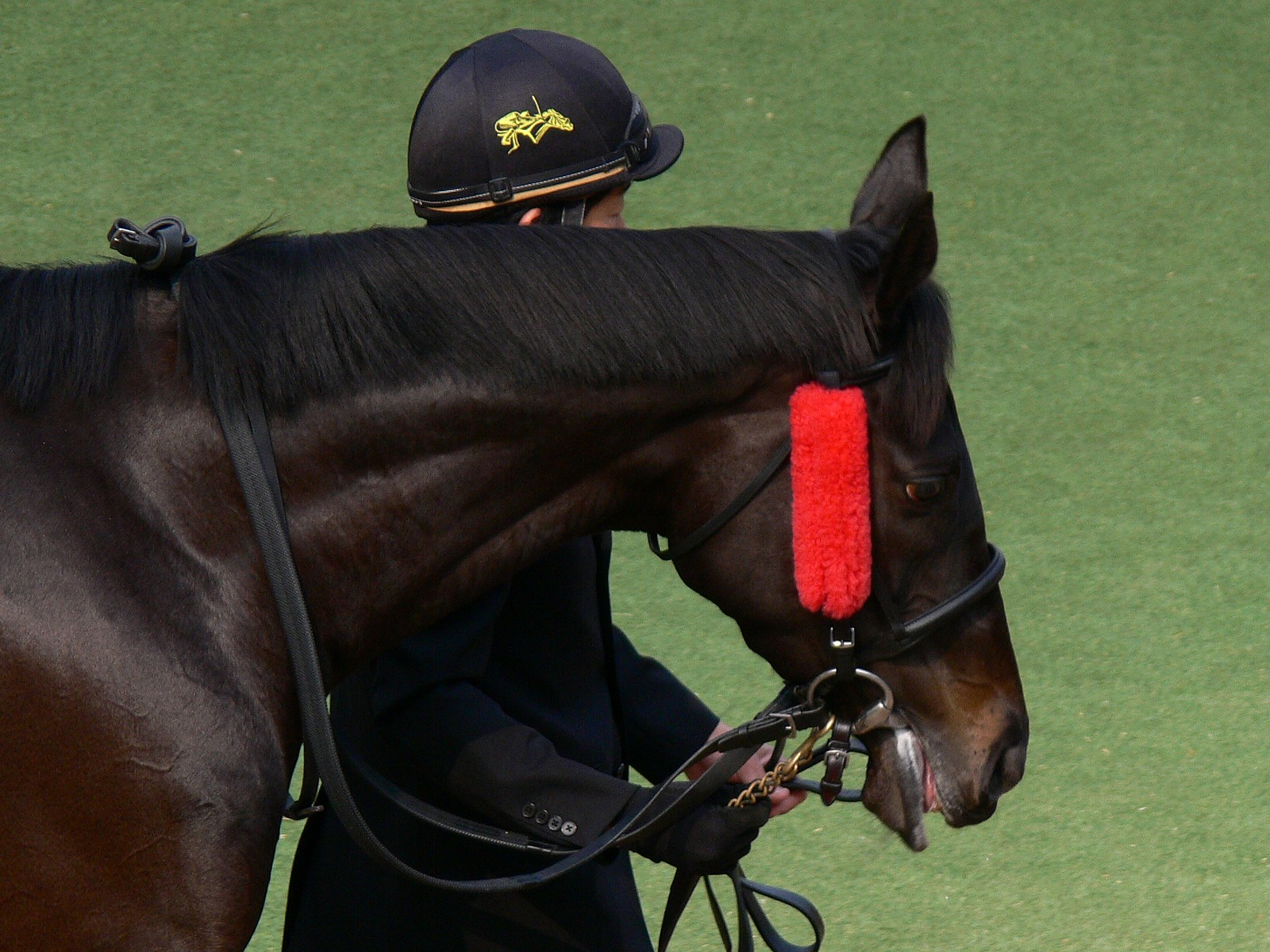
Coloured winkers, of the style used in Thoroughbred racing.

- Via the cape: The horse ran wide on the home turn and covered too much ground. The expression is probably an analogy of the ocean voyage from the UK to Australia via the Cape of Good Hope compared to the more direct route via the Suez Canal.
- Visor blinkers: Blinkers that have a peep hole cut in them and are used to limit a horse's vision during a race and improve concentration.

== W ==
- Wager: Another term for bet.
- Warned off: A person warned-off a racecourse is not permitted to enter a racecourse or associate with licensed persons.
- Weigh out: Before each race, a jockey, and his equipment are weighed to ensure that the horse carries its allotted weight.
- Weight for Age: Better class of race in which the weight a horse carries is allocated on a set scale according to its age and sex. The Cox Plate, which is regarded as Australia's best race, is a weight-for-age event held by the Moonee Valley Racing Club in October each year.
- Weight-for-age handicap: The system used to determine weights for the Melbourne Cup in which the weight of the jockey and riding gear is adjusted with ballast to a nominated figure. Older horses are given more weight than younger ones, and weightings are further adjusted according to the horse's previous results.
- Welcher: Person who refuses to honour a bet.
- Welter: A handicap race with a higher minimum weight.
- Whip: A race whip (or crop) made to Australian specifications, is about 22-24 inches long, and a jockey uses it to control and encourage a horse to increase its speed.
- Winkers: A sheepskin device which attaches to the cheek straps of the bridle to help the horse focus its vision to the front. Winkers allow more side vision than a blinker.
- Wouldn't back it with bad money: An indication that a punter has no confidence in a horses chances such that even if he had counterfeit money he would not back it.
- Write your own ticket: An expression indicating that a horse is at very long odds, with very little chance of winning.

== Y ==
- Yours for theirs: A bet taken at odds of even money.

== Z ==
- Zambuck: Ambulance, as required at all race meetings.

== See also ==
- Equine coat color
- Glossary of equestrian terms
- Harness racing in Australia
- Harness racing in New Zealand
- Thoroughbred racing in Australia
- Thoroughbred racing in New Zealand
- Glossary of North American horse racing
