= Rising Fast =

New Zealand-bred Thoroughbred racehorse

- Rising Fast & Bill Williamson
- Sire: Alonzo*
- Grandsire: Mid-day Sun
- Dam: Faster
- Damsire: Mr. Standfast*
- Sex: Gelding
- Foaled: 1949
- Country: New Zealand
- Colour: Bay or brown
- Breeder: Frank & Bruce Robertson
- Owner: Leicester R. Spring
- Trainer: Irvine Tucker; Fred Hoysted
- Record: 68 starts: 24 wins, 16½ seconds, 2 thirds
- Earnings: £66,765 $133,530

Major wins
- Caulfield Stakes (1954); Caulfield Cup (1954, 1955); W. S. Cox Plate (1954); Melbourne Cup (1954); C.B.Fisher Plate (1954, 1955); John F Feehan Handicap (1954); LKS Mackinnon Stakes (1954, 1955); Turnbull Stakes (1954); VRC Queen Elizabeth Stakes (1954, 1955); Herbert Power Handicap (1955); Blamey Stakes (1956); C F Orr Stakes (1956); Memsie Stakes (1956)

Honours
- New Zealand Racing Hall of Fame; Australian Racing Hall of Fame (2002)
- Last updated on 16 October 2009

Rising Fast (1949 - 1978) was a champion New Zealand-bred Thoroughbred racehorse who is the only horse to complete the Spring Grand Slam, winning the Melbourne Cup, Caulfield Cup, and Cox Plate in 1954. He also won the 1955 Caulfield Cup and came second in the 1955 Melbourne Cup.

== Breeding ==
Rising Fast was bred by brothers Frank and Bruce Robertson at their Platform Lodge farm at Greytown in the Wairarapa. He was a bay or brown gelding by Alonzo (GB) and from the mare Faster, by Mr. Standfast. Alonzo was a poorly performed racehorse having only won one race on the flat and one over the hurdles in England. Faster was unplaced at her only two starts, but produced seven winners from ten foals. Rising Fast was purchased at the 1950 New Zealand National Sales for 325 guineas by first time racehorse owner, Leicester R. Spring.

=== 1954 racebook ===
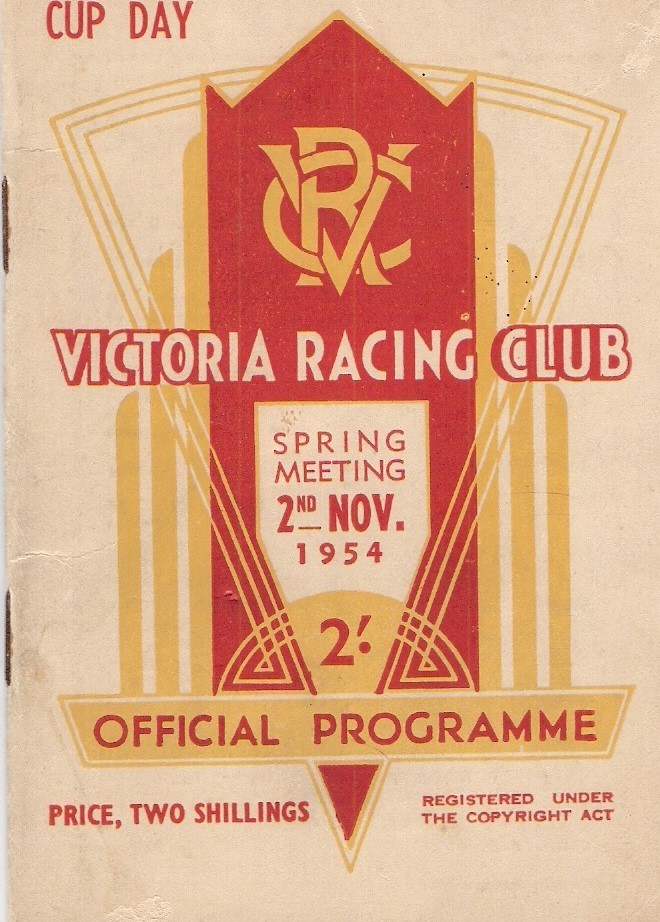
1954 VRC Melbourne Cup racebook front cover

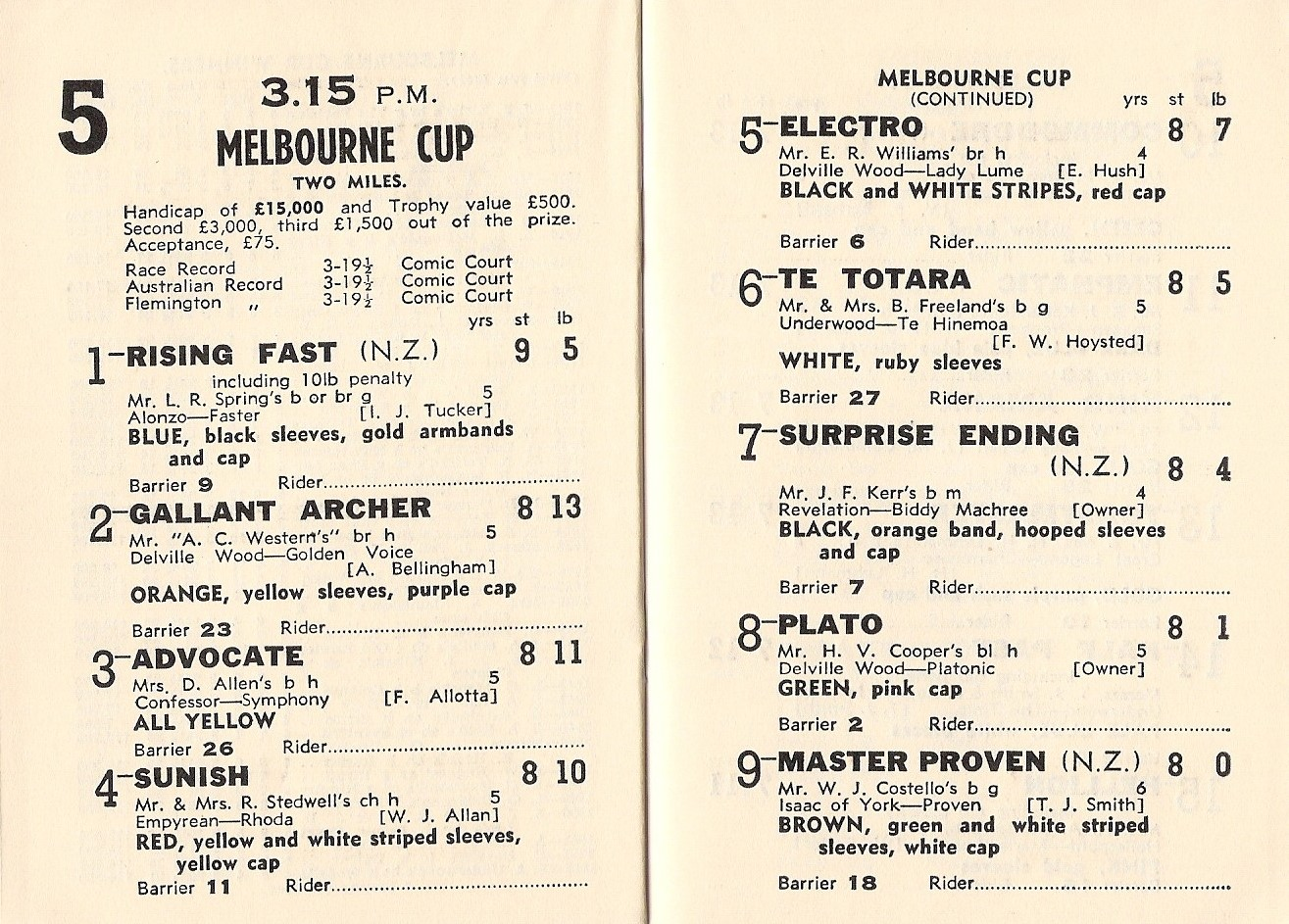
1954 Melbourne Cup starters and results showing the winner, Rising Fast

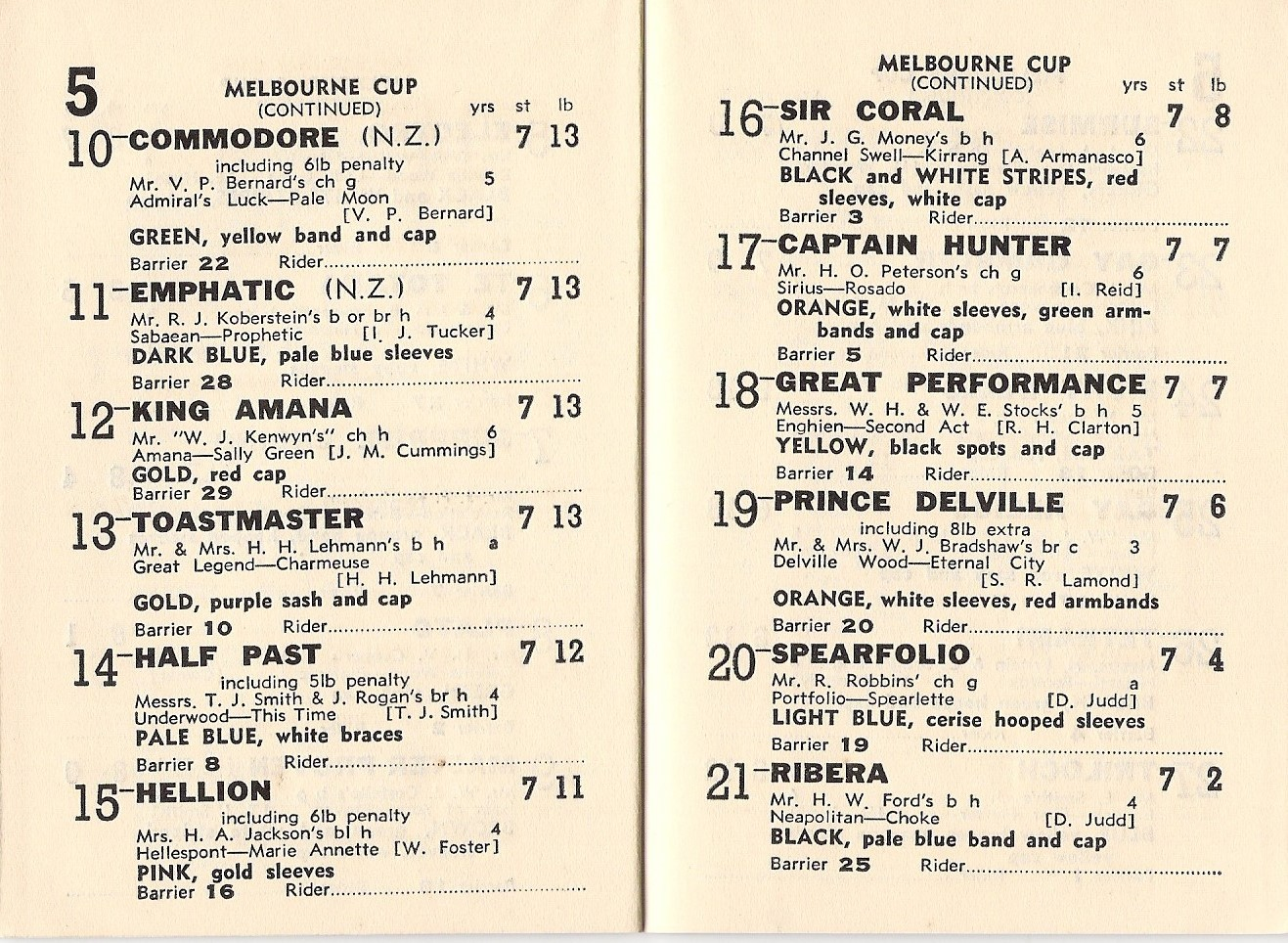
1954 VRC Melbourne Cup racebook starters and results

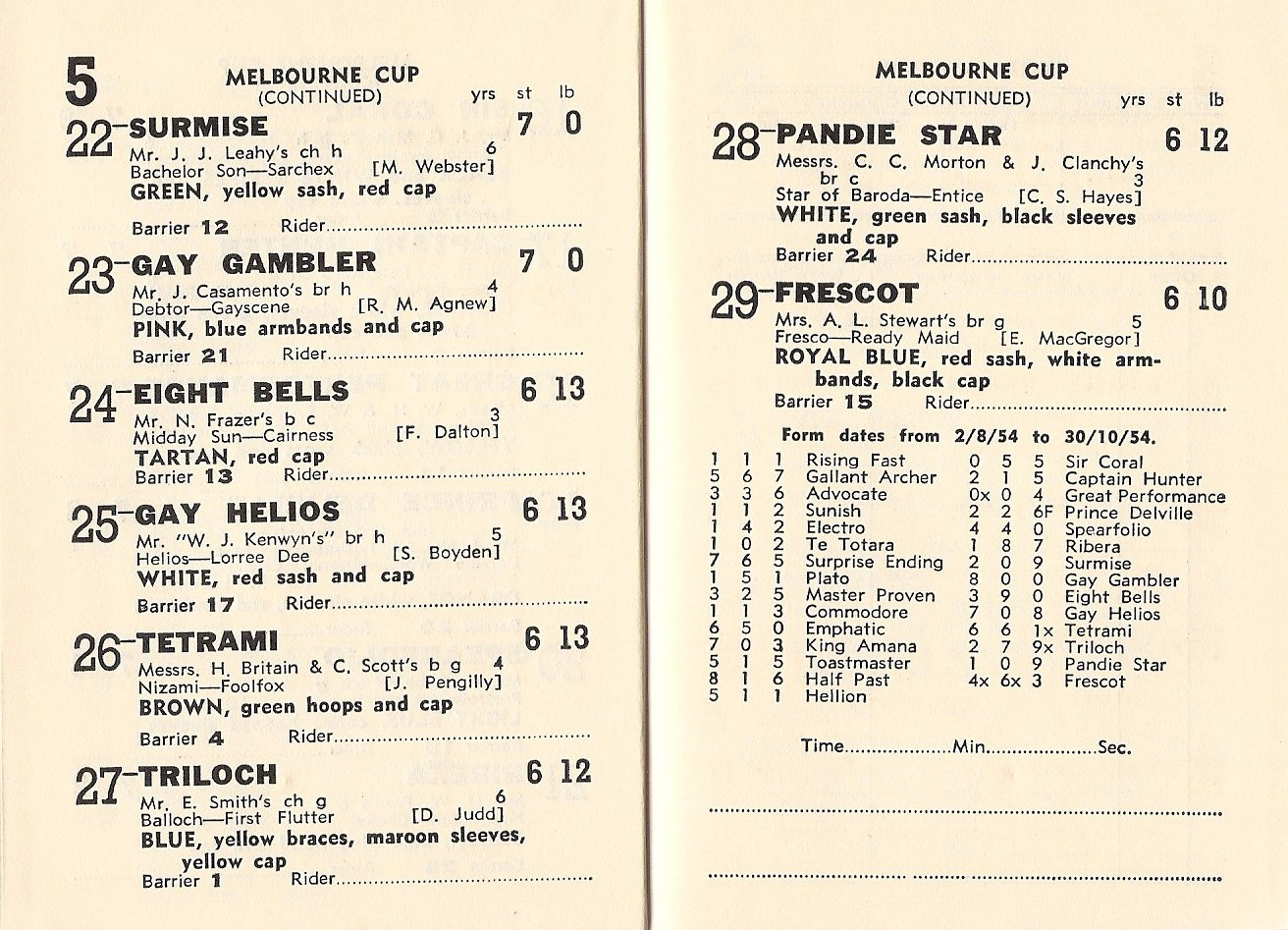
1954 VRC Melbourne Cup racebook starters and results

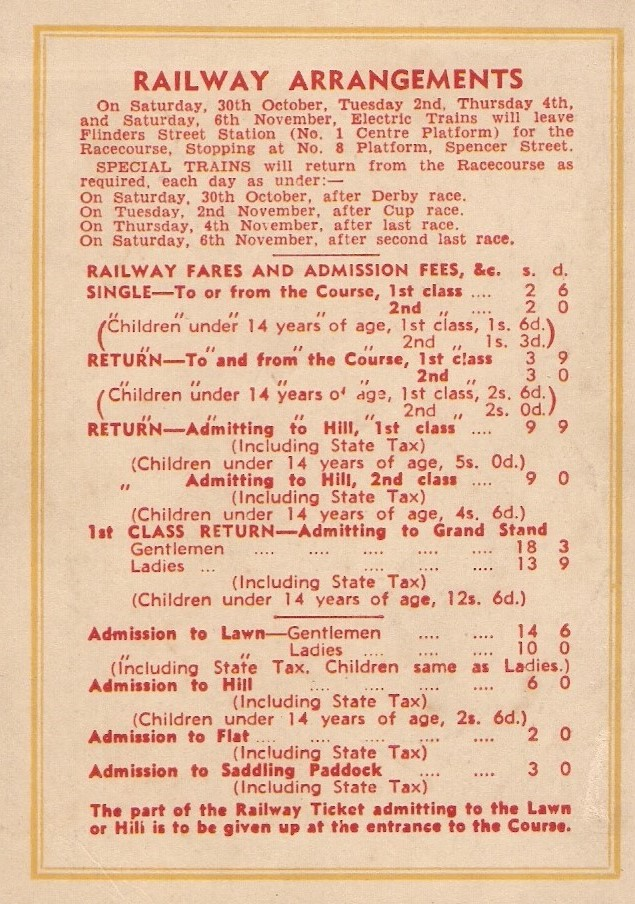
Back cover showing admission fees & railway fares

=== 1954 racebook ===
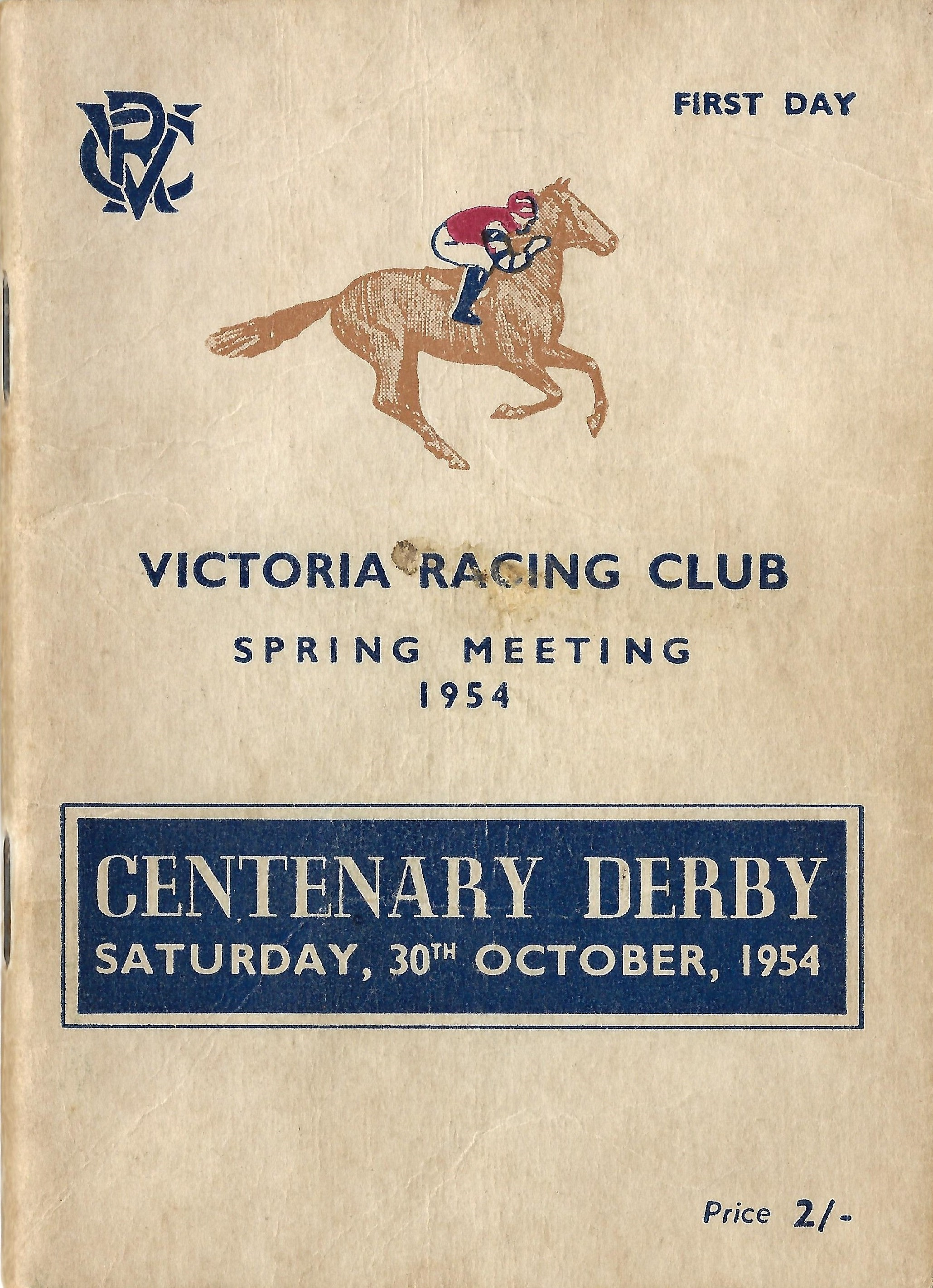
1954 VRC Derby racebook front cover

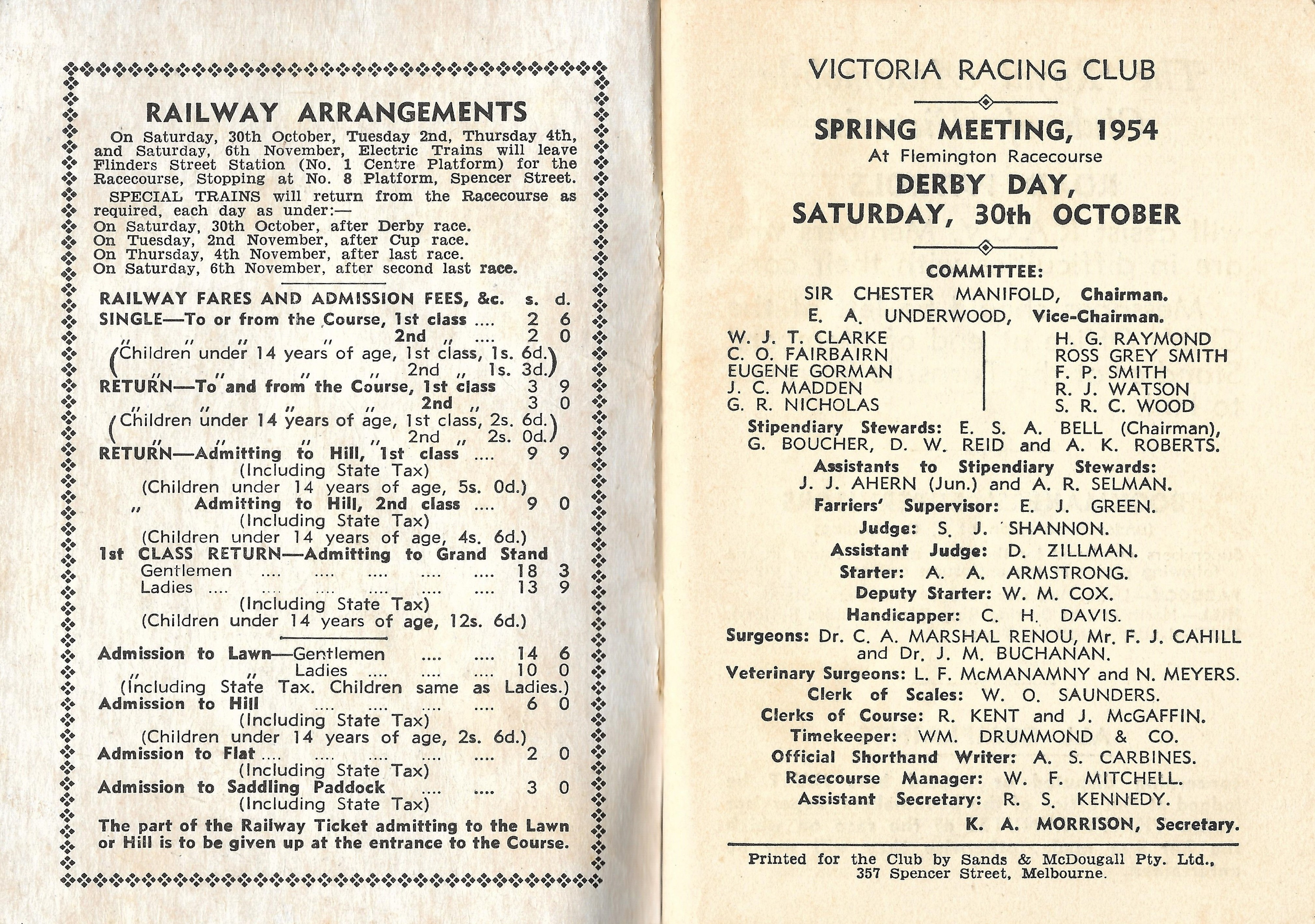
1954 VRC Derby raceday officials

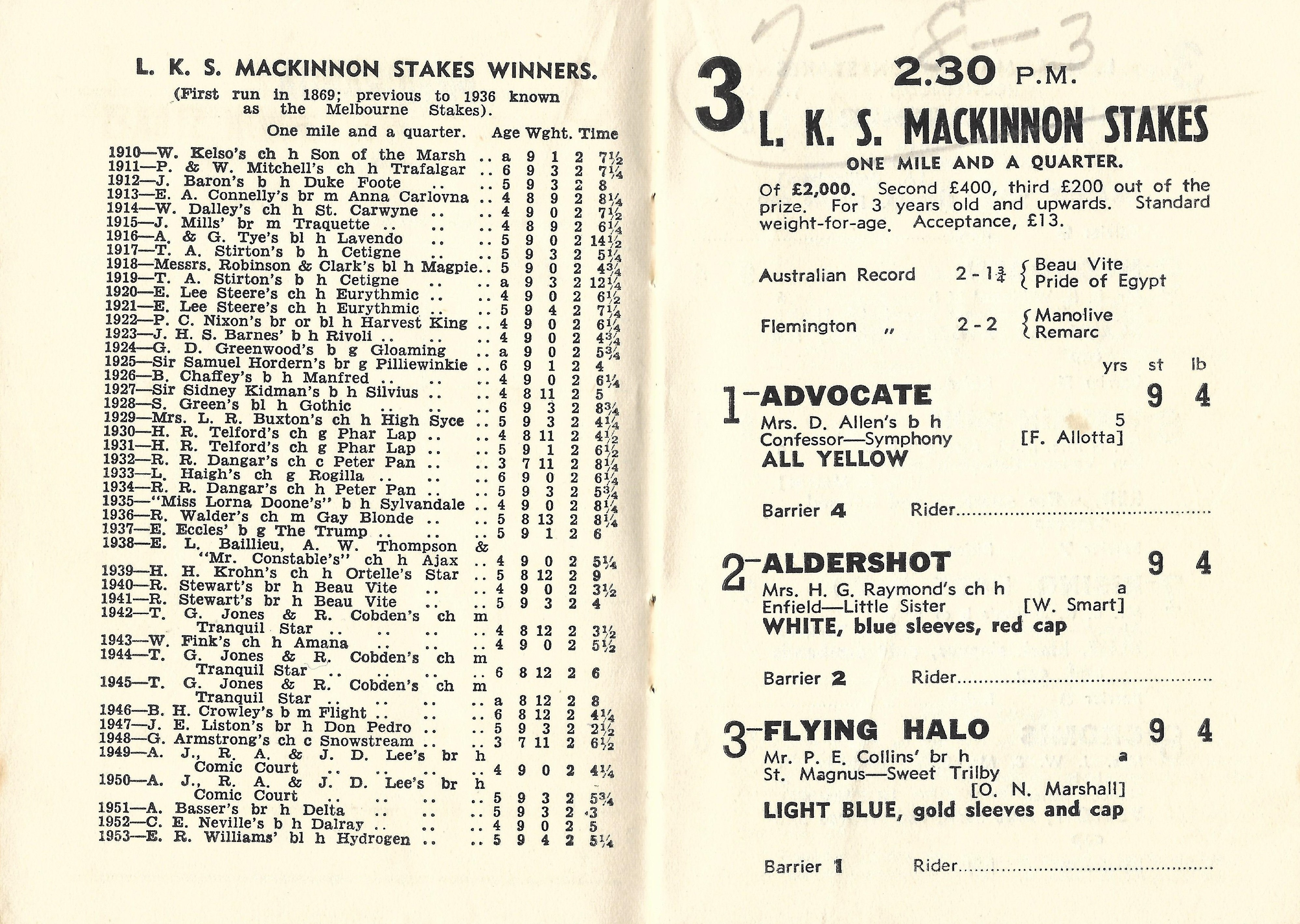
1954 LKS Mackinnon Stakes page starters and results

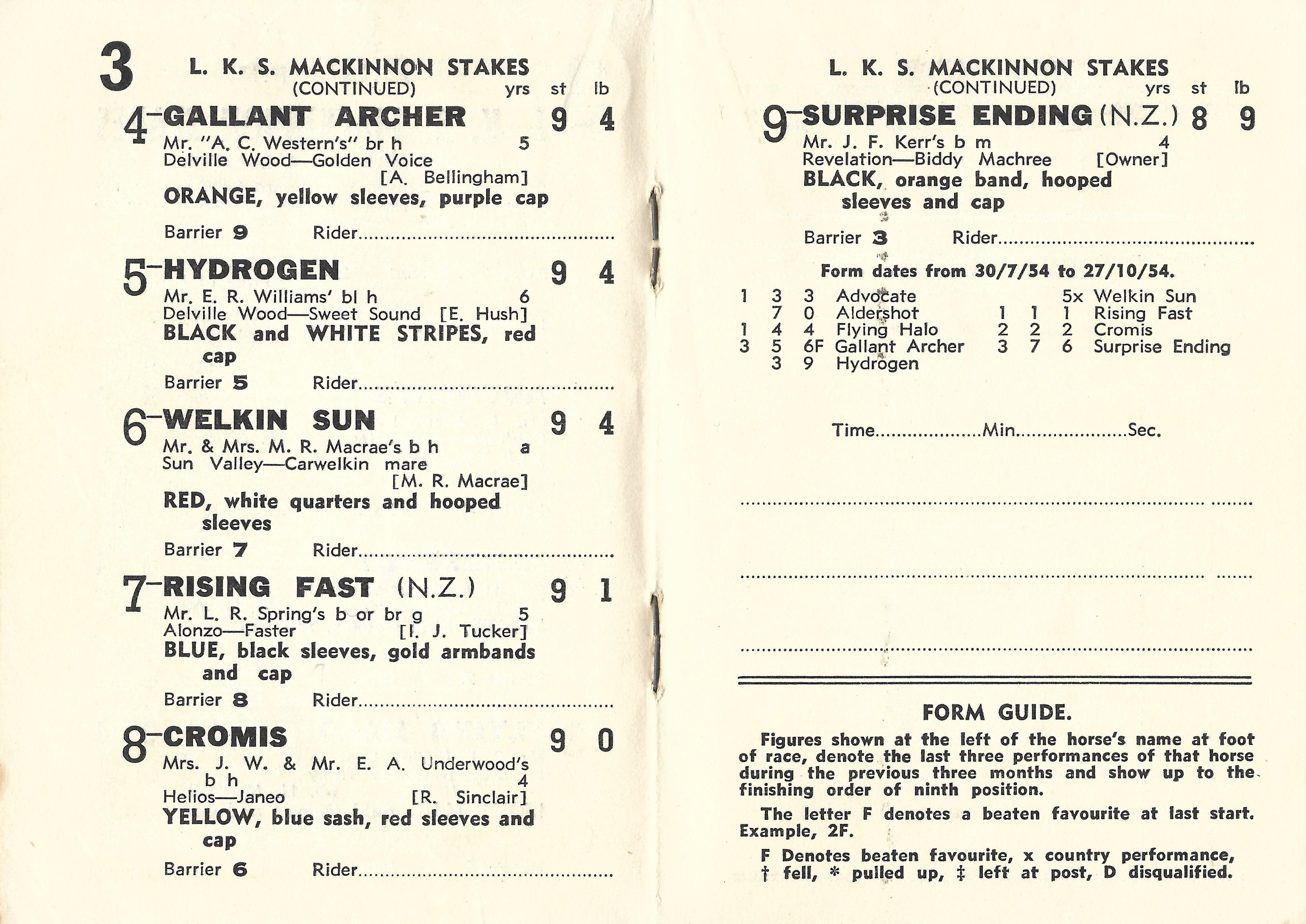
1954 LKS Mackinnon Stakes page showing the winner, Rising Fast

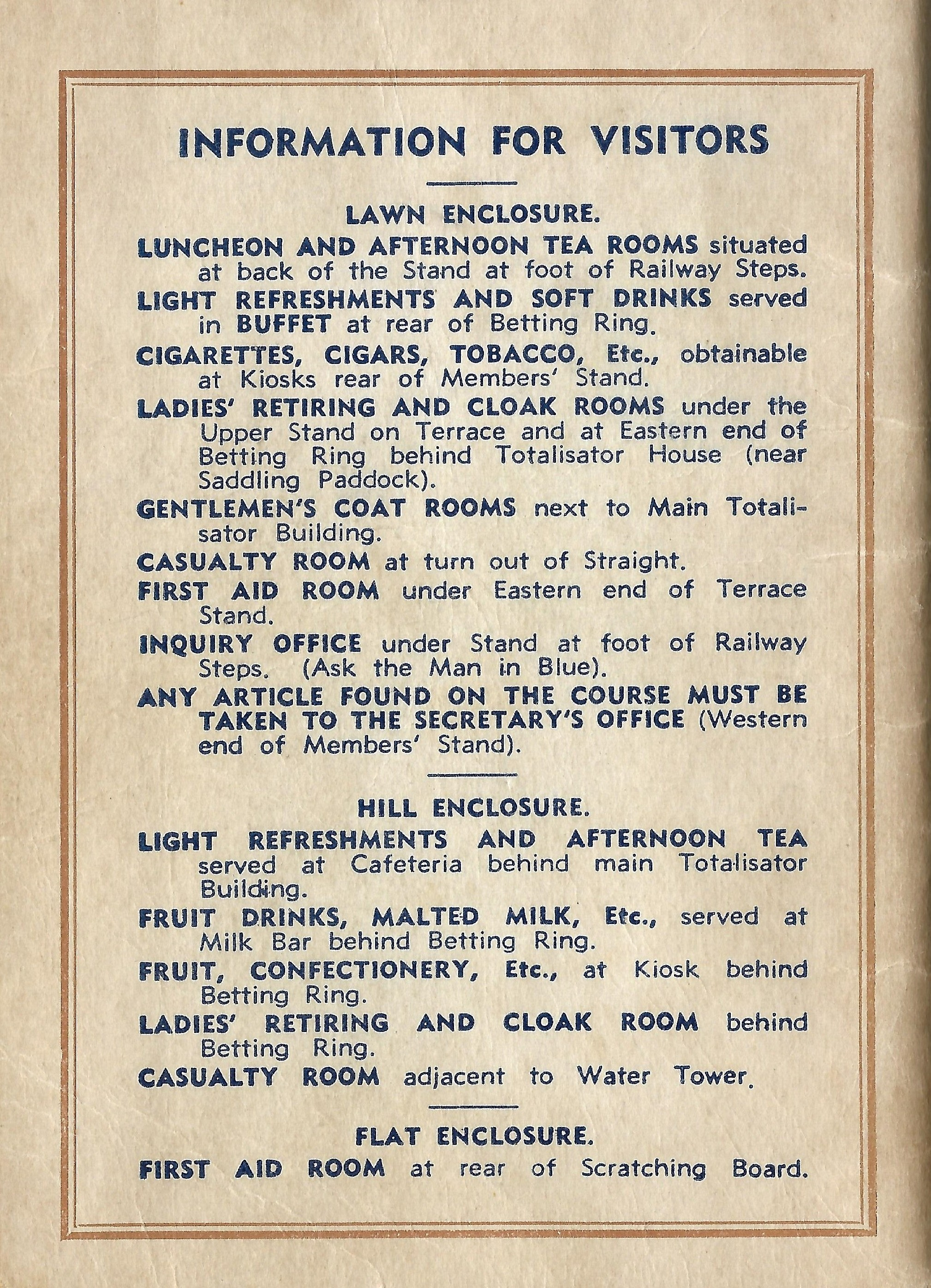
Back cover showing enclosure information for visitors

== Racing career ==
Raced by his owner Leicester Spring and trained by both Ivan Tucker and Fred Hoysted, Rising Fast's blue, gold and black colours soon became familiar on New Zealand race tracks.

He was a seasoned five-year-old when he made the sea voyage to Melbourne in 1954 for the spring (Southern Hemisphere) carnival. He was already well known in racing circles when he arrived, but his accomplishment of winning the Spring Grand Slam put him on front pages of newspapers in Australia, New Zealand and internationally.

Although many people consider the Melbourne and Caulfield Cup handicaps to be the blue ribbon events of the carnival, racing aficionados generally agree the weight-for-age Cox Plate is the contest that establishes genuine champions.

Nowadays, the Melbourne Cup is internationally known and Rising Fast was aiming for his sixth successive win. Race-goers still remember that the nine stone five pounds (2.3 kg) Rising Fast carried to win the cup in 1954, has only been exceeded by Rain Lover who carried nine stone seven pounds (3.2 kg) in 1969. Nor has the race been won since by any top weighted horse, wearing number one saddle cloth, until Makybe Diva did so in 2005. Rising Fast finished the 1954 season with wins which included the Turnbull Stakes, Caulfield Stakes, Caulfield Cup, Cox Plate, Melbourne Cup, LKS Mackinnon Stakes and VRC C.B.Fisher Plate during a great spring campaign.

Rising Fast was ridden in the 1954 events by Melbourne jockey Bill Williamson but when he was seriously injured prior to the Caulfield Cup he was replaced by Arthur Ward. Melbourne jockey Jack Purtell took over for his next races including the Melbourne Cup, but he was replaced by Bill Williamson the following year 1955 he again won the Caulfield Cup, for the second time.

He was handicapped with the formidable top weight of ten stone in the 1955 Melbourne Cup. It was a very wet and heavy track, a holdup at the barrier caused a delay of some five minutes, Bill Williamson the jockey decided to remain in the saddle, together with the lead weights making a very heavy burden for Rising Fast. Rising Fast began well, but in the last 200 metres he was jostled offstride by Toporoa ridden by Neville Sellwood and came a close second. The crowd expected jockey Williamson to protest, but owner Leicester Spring philosophically declared it was a racing incident and the protest was not lodged.

However, Neville Sellwood, the rider of Toporoa, was subsequently suspended for two months for interfering with the run of Rising Fast. Had Rising Fast won his record would have been two Caulfield Cups, a Cox Plate and two Melbourne Cups, and those wins would have been in successive years.

When Rising Fast retired, the Moonee Valley Racing Club held a special farewell for the champion, who strode up the straight with a garland of flowers around his neck, while the band played "The Maori Farewell."

Rising Fast is recognised in both Australia and New Zealand. He was inducted into both the New Zealand and Australian Racing Halls of Fame.

In 1971 Rising Fast's owner, Leicester Russell Spring, had his book, "Racing with Rising Fast" published.

== See also ==
- Thoroughbred racing in New Zealand
- List of leading Thoroughbred racehorses
- List of Melbourne Cup winners
