= Spring Grand Slam =

The Spring Grand Slam is a series of three Thoroughbred horse races held in Australia each Southern Hemisphere spring. The series consists of the Caulfield Cup, the Cox Plate, and the Melbourne Cup.

There is no official Triple Crown for these Melbourne races, but racing fans consider these three Group 1 races to be the major interconnected component of the spring carnival package, while also acknowledging that only a superhorse could win them all in the same season to complete a grand slam.

The only horse to win the Spring Grand Slam is the New Zealand-bred champion Rising Fast.

== About the Spring Grand Slam ==
The "Spring Grand Slam" in Melbourne is considered by some in the racing industry to be more difficult to win than the famous Triple Crown in the United States because the Australian races contain many more variables.

The Triple Crown — involving the Kentucky Derby, Preakness Stakes and Belmont Stakes — is contested only by three-year-olds who race over distances between 1910 metres (Preakness) and 2400 metres (Belmont). The horses all carry the same weight (fillies a little less than colts and geldings), and none of the horses are being asked to race around the track in an unaccustomed direction.

In Melbourne, the races are open to all horses aged three and over, and they race between 2,040 metres (Cox Plate) and 3,200 metres (Melbourne Cup).

The weight carried by horses can vary immensely, both in each race and from race to race, because three different handicapping systems are employed. The Caulfield Cup is a handicap race, the Cox Plate is a weight-for-age race, and the Melbourne Cup is a combination of both, a weight-for-age-handicap.

Furthermore, in the U.S., horses race counter-clockwise on all tracks, but in Australia and New Zealand, there are both clockwise and counter-clockwise tracks. All "Spring Grand Slam" races in Melbourne are raced counter-clockwise, so horses domiciled in areas with predominantly clockwise tracks can be disoriented and not perform to potential.

== Winners and Grand Slam tries ==
Only one horse has ever won the Grand Slam, the New Zealand champion Rising Fast in 1954. Might and Power also won all three races, but not in the same year.
