= Silver Knight (horse) =

New Zealand-bred Thoroughbred racehorse

- Sire: Alcimedes
- Grandsire: Alycidon
- Dam: Cuban Fox
- Damsire: Foxbridge
- Sex: Stallion
- Foaled: 1967
- Died: 1992
- Country: New Zealand
- Colour: Grey
- Breeder: Trelawney Stud
- Owner: Sir Walter Norwood
- Trainer: Eric Temperton

Major wins
- New Zealand St. Leger (1971); Melbourne Cup (1971)

Silver Knight (1967−1992) was a grey New Zealand Thoroughbred racehorse stallion. He was by Alcimedes (GB), his dam Cuban Fox was by Foxbridge. He was bred by Seton Otway at the Trelawney Stud, Cambridge, New Zealand. It was here that Polo Prince, Hi Jinx, Macdougal, Foxzami and Hiraji were bred before also going on to win their Melbourne Cups.

He was the winner of the 1971 Melbourne Cup ridden by Bruce Marsh trained by Eric Temperton. He also won the 1971 New Zealand St. Leger.

At stud he sired four stakes winners of six stakes wins. His son, Black Knight, went on to win the 1984 Melbourne Cup.

== Namesake ==
Australian rail operator CFCL Australia named locomotive CF4402 after the horse.

== See also ==
- Thoroughbred racing in New Zealand
- List of Melbourne Cup winners
