= Foxbridge =

British-bred Thoroughbred racehorse

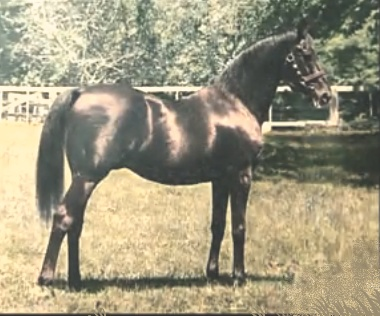
Foxbridge*

Foxbridge (GB) (foaled 1930) was an English Thoroughbred racehorse by Foxlaw out of Bridgemount by Bridge of Earn. His race record was 18 starts for 1 win, 3 seconds and 4 thirds. He was descended through the Bay Ronald sire line.

In 1935, the English stallion Foxbridge was purchased for £2,625 by Seton Otway and transferred to Trelawney Stud near Cambridge, New Zealand. After claiming his first New Zealand sires’ title in the 1940-41 season he went on to be New Zealand's most successful sire and brood-mare sire for 11 consecutive seasons. Twice he was the British Empire's champion sire.

Foxbridge's potency was illustrated at Ellerslie Racecourse on Boxing Day 1944, when his progeny won six races on an eight-race card.

His progeny included:

- Foxwyn, winner of the 1944 Auckland Cup
- Neenah, winner of the Railway Handicap
- Sleepy Fox who won the Easter Handicap four times, from 1944-47. He also won the Canterbury Stakes and Chelmsford Stakes in Australia.

His female offspring were to produce five Melbourne Cup winners:

- Hiraji out of Duvach by Nizami, winner of the 1947 Melbourne Cup
- Foxzami out of Honeywood by Nizami, winner of the 1949 Melbourne Cup, Hotham Handicap and STC Cup
- Macdougal out of Lady Fox by Marco Polo, winner of the 1959 Melbourne Cup, AJC Metropolitan Handicap and Brisbane Cup
- Hi Jinx out of Lady's Bridge by Pride of Kildare, winner of the 1960 Melbourne Cup
- Silver Knight out of Cuban Fox by Alcimedes, winner of the 1971 Melbourne Cup and New Zealand St. Leger

Other notable descendants of Foxbridge include:

- Battle Heights
- Shout The Bar

Foxbridge was inducted into the New Zealand Racing Hall of Fame in 2008.

He has the honour of having a race named after him, the Foxbridge Plate (Group 2). His name has also been used for a retirement village in Te Rapa.

== See also ==
- Thoroughbred racing in New Zealand
