= Trelawney Stud =

Coordinates: 37°55′12.27″S 175°30′57.19″E

Trelawney Stud is New Zealand’s oldest commercial Thoroughbred horse stud farm. It was established in 1930 by Seton Otway near Cambridge, New Zealand.

The facility has stood stallions including Foxbridge, Kingdom Bay, and Carnegie (IRE). It has produced race horses including seven Melbourne Cup winners.

== History ==
Seton Otway’s stud foundation was commenced when he purchased several mares with impeccable female families. Unable to purchase well-performed mares he bought half-sisters to top performers but not necessarily outstanding horses themselves. His early acquisitions included Persis and Lady Marie (both foaled in 1923), who established families of major stakes-winners in New Zealand and Australia.

The site of the present stud farm was established when Seton Otway purchased a run-down, 300-acre (1.2 km^{2}), dairy farm on the banks of the Waikato River, on the North Island of New Zealand. This was to become the famous Trelawney Stud and the future home of some of Australasia’s top thoroughbreds and racehorses.

In 1935, Seton Otway purchased and imported the sire Foxbridge (GB), who was a good racehorse in England, for £2,625. He became one of New Zealand's most successful stallions and brood-mare sires for eleven consecutive seasons.

Another very successful Trelawney Stud stallion was Alcimedes (GB) (by Alycidon), a winner over distances from 7 to 10½ furlongs. Alcimedes' first crop included VRC Derby winner Prince Grant and the Melbourne Cup winner Galilee. His progeny often raced in Australia, including Divide and Rule and Silver Knight a Melbourne Cup winner and in turn the sire of 1984 Melbourne Cup winner, Black Knight. Alcimedes also sired the winners of 20 races in South Africa.

Seton Otway's son Jum was later the studmaster at Trelawney. Trelawney Stud was briefly owned by Australian businessman, Robert Holmes à Court and his Heytesbury Stud. During the early 1990s Trelawney Stud was purchased from Robert Holmes à Court by the Taylor family. As at 2021, Brent and Cherry Taylor still own the property.

In 2006, Trelawney stood the top juvenile, Van Nistelrooy (USA) (by Storm Cat), a US$6.4 million yearling.

In recent times the farm has moved away from standing stallions. It now focuses on broodmares and young horses. It is also a working sheep and cattle farm.

== Past Stallions ==
The following stallions have stood at Trelawney Stud:

- Alcimedes
- Al Akbar
- Carnegie: sire of Amalfi (2001 Victoria Derby winner), Carnegie Express (winner of Canterbury Guineas, Rosehill Guineas), Perlin (winner of the Doomben Cup and Underwood Stakes), Tuesday Joy (winner of the Coolmore Classic, Ranvet Stakes, The BMW and Chipping Norton Stakes) and Vision and Power (winner of the Doncaster Handicap and George Ryder Stakes).
- Dance Floor
- Elusive City
- First Consul (USA)
- Foxbridge: 11 times New Zealand premier sire.
- Gay Shield (GB 1992, Gay Crusader), the first stallion to stand at Trelawney. Half-brother to Beau Pere
- Groom Dancer
- Is It True
- Khorassan (GB)
- Kingdom Bay: 2 time New Zealand premier sire.
- Marco Polo II (Fra)
- Moorcock (GB)
- Nizami
- Old Soldier (GB)
- Palace Music
- Patron Saint (GB)
- Pride of Kildare (Ire)
- Princes Gate (Ire 1977, Realm - Consensus): winner of the 1981 Prix Perth and 1982 Westbury Stakes
- Rousseau's Dream (Ire)
- Val Du Fier (Fra)
- Van Nistelrooy (USA 2000, Storm Cat - Halory)
- Wolverton (Ire 1976, Wolver Hollow - Mary Murphy), winner of the 1979 Prix du Rond Point and 1980 Prix Edmond Blanc

== Progeny ==
The Trelawney brand has been carried by seven Melbourne Cup winners:

- 1949 - Foxzami, (Nizami - Honeywood).
- 1947 - Hiraji, (Nizami - Duvach)
- 1959 - Macdougal, (Marco Polo - Lady Fox).
- 1960 - Hi Jinx, (Pride of Kildare - Lady's Bridge).
- 1964 - Polo Prince, (Marco Polo - Sou' East).
- 1966 - Galilee, (Alcimedes - Galston).
- 1971 - Silver Knight, (Alcimedes - Cuban Fox).

Trelawney Stud’s first million dollar yearling, a son of Redoute's Choice out of the stakes winning-mare National Treasure, sold for A$1.5 million at the 2009 Inglis Yearling Sale in Sydney.

Other horses that have come from Trelawney include:

- I'm Thunderstruck (Shocking - Primadonna Girl): winner of the 2022 Makybe Diva Stakes, 2021 G1 Toorak Handicap and 2021 Golden Eagle
- Ocean Park (Thorn Park - Sayyida by Zabeel): winner of the 2012 Cox Plate.
- Grunt (O'Reilly - Ruqqaya, by Van Nistelrooy): winner of the 2018 C S Hayes Stakes (G3), Australian Guineas (G1) and Makybe Diva Stakes (G1).
- Spieth (Thorn Park - Stella Livia by Titus Livius): winner of the listed City Tatts Lightning Handicap (1100m) and 4 other races. Also runner up in the 2016 Darley Classic (Group 1, Flemington 1200m) and 2017 Black Caviar Lightning (Group 1, Flemington 1200m).
- Tulloch - champion racehorse.

== See also ==
- Thoroughbred racing in New Zealand
- Cambridge Stud
- Windsor Park Stud
