= 1947 Melbourne Cup =

Melbourne horse racing event

- Melbourne Cup
- Location: Flemington Racecourse
- Date: 4 November 1947
- Distance: 2 miles
- Winning horse: Hiraji
- Winning time: 3:28.00
- Final odds: 12/1
- Jockey: Jack Purtell
- Trainer: Jim McCurley
- Owner: F. W. Hughes
- Conditions: heavy
- Surface: Turf
- Attendance: 80,000

The 1947 Melbourne Cup was a two-mile handicap horse race which took place on Tuesday, 4 November 1947.

The full field and placings were:

Place	Name	Jockey
1	Hiraji	Jack Purtell
2	Fresh Boy	B. Eames
3	Red Fury	P. Simonds
4	Proctor	W. Briscoe
5	Royal Scot	N. Powell
6	Conductor	W. Cook
7	Clatterbag	R. Hutchinson
8	Open Air	J. Gilmore
9	Valcurl	W. Williamson
10	Glamis Star	N. McGrowdie
11	Amelia	V. Hartney
12	Gayness	A. Ayres
13	Robert Bruce	D. Cameron
14	El Senor	D. Barclay
15	Buonarroti Boy	G. Bougoure
16	Sir Actor	T. Unkovich
17	Miss Prim	W. Beresford
18	Faunus	R. Morrissey
19	Sweet Chime	N. Sellwood
20	Dark Marne	J. Thompson
21	Lashio	K. Simon
22	Good Idea	H. Badger
23	Chanak	B. Kerrigan
24	Embrolita	H. Hall
25	Bannerette	E. Preston
26	King's Walk	M. Raven
27	Kerry Lad	G. Moore
28	Orthodox	H. McLoud
29	Star of India	W. A. Smith
30	Murray Stream	D. Munro

== See also ==
- Melbourne Cup
- List of Melbourne Cup winners
- Victoria Racing Club
