= Pat Glennon =

Australian jockey

Pat Glennon (23 August 1927 – 14 February 2004) was an Australian jockey raised in the Ascot Vale area in Melbourne, not far from the Flemington Racecourse. Glennon rode his first winner, a horse named Alares, trained by his father, at a bush track Bacchus Marsh at the age of 13.

Glennon then moved to South Australia, where he rode with great success, quickly becoming one of the leading apprentices in Adelaide. Linking with Jim Cummings' team (the father of the great Bart), he went on to pilot Comic Court to victory in the 1950 Melbourne Cup. He would later go on to win another Cup in 1959 with the Richard W. Roden trained Macdougal.

Wanting to embellish his already solid career, Glennon went abroad seeking further opportunities. Settling in Ireland, where he stepped into shoes of Garnet Bougoure as Vincent O'Brien's number one hoop. He soon blossomed into a fearsome rider, winning the jockey's championship. While in Ireland, he came to terms with the French trainer Etienne Pollet and accepted a contract to ply his trade in France. It is here that he and Sea-Bird came together. He and the son of Dan Cupid would sweep through the 1965 flat season winning all before them, culminating in victories in both The Derby and the Prix de l'Arc de Triomphe. Sea-Bird would end his racing days as the highest rated flat horse of all time.

Pat Glennon would become the only Australian jockey to taste success in the Epsom Derby, Melbourne Cup and the Prix de L'Arc de Triomphe. He died on 14 February 2004 at the age of 76.
