= Dick Roden =

Australian racehorse trainer (1925-1991)

Dick Roden (8 November 1925 – 21 August 1991) was an Australian racehorse trainer. He trained Macdougal, which was in 1959, the first horse to win the Brisbane Cup, Metropolitan Handicap and Melbourne Cup in the same year. Roden became in 1959 Australia's youngest ever trainer of a Melbourne Cup winner until 58 years later. He is an inductee to the 2005 Queensland Racing Hall of Fame.

== Early life ==
Richard William Roden was born in Mackay, Queensland. His father Bill was a veterinary surgeon. His grandfather Henry Roden owned a property near Clermont where he bred horses and taught Dick to ride. Dick Roden attended a Christian Brothers school in Mackay and later Gatton Agricultural College where he was a house-captain, played in the first XI and XV and was school's senior athletics champion from 1943 to 1945. He worked part-time at the Mackay Turf Club's Ooralea Park as a handler from the age of twelve and in his senior school years rode racehorses as an amateur jockey. He rode over one hundred winners on Queensland race tracks during the war years when amateurs were allowed to ride against the professional jockeys.

== Racing life ==
In 1946 Roden took a job as a racing steward with the Rockhampton Jockey Club. He served on a judiciary panel with Nieve Frawley who was later the chief stipendiary steward in Queensland Racing. Roden met and married Nieve's daughter Elaine Frawley. For a brief period Roden relocated to Sydney and rode trackwork for the trainer Jack Green.

In 1949 Roden commenced his career as a trainer in Toowoomba, Queensland. His first winner was Falcon Man at Eagle Farm in 1950, Roden's second ever starter. He had some success with the sprinter Gresford and relocated to Brisbane. Gresford was responsible for the first Roden betting plunge in December 1953 backed from 66/1 to 6/1 to a win at Eagle Farm. In 1954 Dick & Elaine bought Gresford from their client owner and it was the first horse to travel by air from Queensland to a race meeting in Victoria where under their regular jockey David Hetherington it won the Fawkner Highweight at Moonee Valley. With Hetherington again in the seat, Gresford won the 1954 QTC Lightning event.

Continuing success saw Roden in 1956 charged with the care of the New Zealand sprinter, El Khobar by owner Wolff Fisher. He played his part in that horse's overall tally of seven wins and two places in a nine start Australasian program before sending the horse to the USA where it had three wins and set a Santa Anita track record.

In 1967 Roden relocated to Sydney and bought a Randwick stable operation in High Street from Dan Lewis, renaming it Midstream Lodge. The Australian Jockey Club granted Roden a number 1 licence in September 1957. In 1959 Roden's name was set in Australian racing when he took the gelding Macdougal to an extraordinary treble in winning the Brisbane Cup, Metropolitan Handicap and Melbourne Cup. At age 33 Roden became Australia's youngest ever trainer of a Melbourne Cup winner, until 58 years later when in the 2017 Melbourne Cup, at the age of 20, Joseph Patrick O'Brien won with Rekindling, and overnight attracted wealthier owners seeking him out.

He trained a number of winners for Stan and Millie Fox including Honeyland to the 1967 Canterbury Guineas which Roden had picked out as a New Zealand yearling and bought for the Foxes in 1966. In 1968 Roden met the Filipino businessman Felipe Ysmael and Roden took on his stable of Australian horses including Tereus, Sliver Strike and Divide & Rule taking them to some success. When Ysmael was disqualified from involvement in Australian racing after the 1968 Follow Me scandal, Dick & Elaine bought Divide & Rule from Ysmael. In the space of fifteen months Roden lost two of his major clients in Fox and Ysmael and he suffered a nervous breakdown in 1969.

Roden stepped back from training in 1969 and under Neville Begg, Divide & Rule won the 1969 AJC Derby ridden by the Queensland Aboriginal jockey Darby McCarthy. In 1970 Roden and Begg set their sights on the Stradbroke Cup for Divide & Rule. On the flight to Brisbane ten days before the event the horse suffered a head bump and injury but in spite of many journalists and punters dismissing the three-year old's prospects, it won the 1970 Cup. The Rodens took $17,000 in prize money and many punters nationwide saw returns from 10/1 to 5/1. It was one of the largest betting plunges in Australian racing history. A few weeks later Divide & Rule won the Doomben Cup starting as an even favourite. In 1970 Divide & Rule was leased by the Rodens to Mrs Muriel Blum of Chicago. It won a further US$90,000 in prize money there in addition to the $80,000 it had won in Australian starts.

Dick Roden gave up his trainer's license in 1970 at the point of Divide & Rule's transfer to the USA. Roden became a publican in Waterloo, Sydney for a period in the 1970s. In the mid 1970s Dick and Elaine relocated back to Queensland where they established a successful breeding business in Roden Bloodstock.

== Training record ==
In a relatively short training career of less than two decades and with only a small team of horses his classic, group and listed winners included:

- Kev Mar: 1953 Queensland Guineas; 1954 AJC Villiers.
- Gresford: 1954 QTC Lightning Handicap.
- French Charm: 1955 Moonee Valley Stakes; 1956 Theo Marks Quality.
- El Khobar: 1956 Doomben 10,000, QTC Ascot Handicap. AJC Warwick Stakes
- Barron Boissier: 1957 Hotham Handicap; 1957 Colin Stephens Stakes; 1958 Alister Clark Stakes.
- Raajpoot: 1961 Queensland Derby and Queensland Cup.
- Hoa Hine: 1962 QTC Oaks.
- Nebo Road: 1965 Breeders Plate; 1967 Newmarket Handicap.
- Honeyland: 1967 Canterbury Guineas.
- Divide and Rule: 1969 AJC Derby; 1970 Doomben Cup; 1970 Stradbroke Handicap.

== Later life ==
Roden lived out his retirement in the Blackall Ranges overlooking Queensland's Sunshine Coast. He died in 1991 aged 65 and is survived by his sons Daniel and Richard.
