= Battle Heights =

New Zealand-bred Thoroughbred racehorse

- Sire: Battle Waggon (GB)
- Grandsire: Never Say Die (USA)
- Dam: Wuthering Heights (NZ)
- Damsire: Avocat General (IRE)
- Sex: Gelding
- Foaled: 1967
- Died: 1999
- Country: New Zealand
- Colour: Brown
- Breeder: ...
- Trainer: Tim Douglas
- Record: 115:23-14-15
- Earnings: A$212,825

Major wins
- Wellington Cup (1974); Trentham Stakes (1974); New Zealand International Stakes (1974); Sydney Cup (1974); Queen Elizabeth Stakes (1974); W S Cox Plate (1974); C B Cox Stakes (1974); Craven Plate (1976); Metropolitan Handicap (1976)
- Last updated on 27 December 2012

Battle Heights was a notable New Zealand thoroughbred racehorse.

A son of Battle-Waggon from the mare Wuthering Heights, he was foaled in 1967 and was trained throughout his career by Tim Douglas.

Douglas was a farmer and all-round horseman based in Morrinsville in the north-eastern Waikato province of New Zealand. As well as being a successful racehorse trainer, he was an accomplished polo player and bought Wuthering Heights, a young thoroughbred mare, with the intention of including her in a consignment of polo ponies purchased for the Sultan of Brunei. That plan had to change, however, when it became apparent that Wuthering Heights was pregnant, forcing Douglas to retain her. She subsequently produced a foal whose sire was believed to be a non-thoroughbred stallion, after which Douglas decided to breed from her himself.

Battle Heights was the fourth full thoroughbred foal produced by Wuthering Heights (the previous three, Gold Heights, Monty and Arctic Heights, also became good performers for Douglas). Battle Heights started in 115 races and raced until he was 10 years old when he was forced into retirement after suffering sesamoid injuries in the 1977 VRC LKS Mackinnon Stakes.

During his career, he raced and won in every season from the age of three until ten, winning 23 times over distances ranging from 1,100m to 3,200m. In New Zealand his wins included the Wellington Cup, Trentham Stakes and New Zealand International Stakes. That led to several campaigns in Australia, where he won the Sydney Cup, Queen Elizabeth Stakes, The Metropolitan (ATC) and Craven Stakes in Sydney; in Melbourne he won the Cox Plate, and in Perth the CB Cox Stakes. His many placings included second in the Caulfield Cup.

Battle Heights was awarded the 1974 New Zealand Horse of the Year title, while Wuthering Heights received the Broodmare of the Year title.

In the 1974 Sydney Cup and Queen Elizabeth Stakes (ATC) he was ridden by New Zealand jockey Gary Willetts, who then decided to establish himself in Australia and became one of the leading jockeys of his era when based in Melbourne, where he still lives.

Battle Heights, known affectionately by the nickname 'Fred', enjoyed a long retirement on the Douglas family farm, where for many years he was the trusty mount of Tim Douglas's wife Elaine. He died at age 32 and is buried on the farm.

== Pedigree ==
Pedigree of Battle Heights
Sire Battle-Waggon 1962	Never Say Die 1951	Nasrullah	Nearco
Sire Battle-Waggon 1962	Never Say Die 1951	Nasrullah	Mumtaz Begum
Sire Battle-Waggon 1962	Never Say Die 1951	Singing Grass	War Admiral
Sire Battle-Waggon 1962	Never Say Die 1951	Singing Grass	Boreale
Sire Battle-Waggon 1962	Carrozza 1954	Dante	Nearco
Sire Battle-Waggon 1962	Carrozza 1954	Dante	Rosy Legend
Sire Battle-Waggon 1962	Carrozza 1954	Calash	Hyperion
Sire Battle-Waggon 1962	Carrozza 1954	Calash	Clarence
Dam Wuthering Heights 1956	Avocat General 1950	Court Martial	Fair Trial
Dam Wuthering Heights 1956	Avocat General 1950	Court Martial	Instantaneous
Dam Wuthering Heights 1956	Avocat General 1950	Cinnamon	Obliterate
Dam Wuthering Heights 1956	Avocat General 1950	Cinnamon	Buchna
Dam Wuthering Heights 1956	Merry Fox 1938	Foxbridge	Foxlaw
Dam Wuthering Heights 1956	Merry Fox 1938	Foxbridge	Bridgemount
Dam Wuthering Heights 1956	Merry Fox 1938	Merry Way	Arausio
Dam Wuthering Heights 1956	Merry Fox 1938	Merry Way	Merry Jest

== See also ==
- Thoroughbred racing in New Zealand
