= Straight Draw =

New Zealand thoroughbred racehorse

- Sire: Faux Tirage
- Grandsire: Big Game
- Dam: Sunbride
- Damsire: Tai-Yang
- Sex: Gelding
- Foaled: 1952
- Country: New Zealand
- Colour: Bay
- Owner: Ezra Norton
- Trainer: Jack Mitchell
- Jockey: Noel McGrowdie
- Record: 48: 12-6-3
- Earnings: £37,479

Major wins
- Melbourne Cup (1957); The Metropolitan (1957); Sydney Cup (1958)

Straight Draw (foaled 1952) was a New Zealand bred thoroughbred racehorse, that is most notable for winning the 1957 Melbourne Cup.

== Background ==
Straight Draw was bred by Little Avondale Stud in New Zealand.

== Racing career ==
Straight Draw started at the odds of 13/2 in the 1957 Melbourne Cup. For some time the race favourite that year was the legendary Tulloch, however connections decided to not run him in the race. Under the guidance of Australian Racing Hall of Fame jockey Noel McGrowdie, Straight Draw won the race by a neck margin.

His owner, Ezra Norton, a strictly private man, remained in Sydney rather than go and watch the race. The horse's trainer Jack Mitchell was sent to collect the Cup on his behalf, avoiding having to make a speech.

Straight Draw also became the first horse to ever win The Metropolitan, Melbourne Cup and Sydney Cup in the same season.

== Pedigree ==
Pedigree of Straight Draw (NZ) 1952
Sire Faux Tirage (GB) 1946	Big Game (GB); 1939	Bahram	Blandford*
Sire Faux Tirage (GB) 1946	Big Game (GB); 1939	Bahram	Friar's Daughter
Sire Faux Tirage (GB) 1946	Big Game (GB); 1939	Myrobella	Tetratema
Sire Faux Tirage (GB) 1946	Big Game (GB); 1939	Myrobella	Dolabella
Sire Faux Tirage (GB) 1946	Commotion (GB); 1938	Mieuxce	Massine
Sire Faux Tirage (GB) 1946	Commotion (GB); 1938	Mieuxce	L'Olivete
Sire Faux Tirage (GB) 1946	Commotion (GB); 1938	Riot	Colorado
Sire Faux Tirage (GB) 1946	Commotion (GB); 1938	Riot	Lady Juror
Dam Sunbride (GB) 1942	Tai-Yang (GB); 1930	Solario	Gainsborough
Dam Sunbride (GB) 1942	Tai-Yang (GB); 1930	Solario	Sun Worship
Dam Sunbride (GB) 1942	Tai-Yang (GB); 1930	Soubriquet	Lemberg
Dam Sunbride (GB) 1942	Tai-Yang (GB); 1930	Soubriquet	Silver Fowl
Dam Sunbride (GB) 1942	Graceful Bride (FR); 1936	Golden Grace	Blandford*
Dam Sunbride (GB) 1942	Graceful Bride (FR); 1936	Golden Grace	Grace Mary
Dam Sunbride (GB) 1942	Graceful Bride (FR); 1936	May Bride	Dark Legend
Dam Sunbride (GB) 1942	Graceful Bride (FR); 1936	May Bride	Wedding Chime

* Straight Draw is inbred 4S x 4D to the stallion Blandford, meaning that he appears fourth generation on the sire side of his pedigree, and fourth generation on the dam side of his pedigree.

== See also ==
- Thoroughbred racing in Australia
- Thoroughbred racing in New Zealand
