= F. W. Hughes =

Australian businessman, pastoralist and racehorse owner

- Born: Fred William Hughes; 12 September 1869; Brisbane, Queensland, Australia
- Died: 18 August 1950 (aged 80); Edgecliff, New South Wales, Australia
- Known for: Businessman, racehorse owner
- Spouse: Matilda Morris (m. 1898; died 1935)

Fred William Hughes (12 September 1869 – 18 August 1950) was an Australian businessman, pastoralist and racehorse owner. Beginning as a wool classer, he built up a business empire that included agricultural holdings and the processing of meat, wool and animal byproducts.

== Early life ==
Hughes was born on 12 September 1869 in Brisbane, Queensland, the son of Sarah (née McLaren) and Henry Benjamin Hughes. His father was a butcher. After a period as a farmhand he began working for Thomas Geddes & Co., a wool-scouring firm in Sydney. He developed expertise in wool classing and was an assistant wool-valuer by the age of 18, eventually becoming manager of the wool-scouring works.

== Business career ==
By 1894, Hughes was associated with the Sydney Wool Scouring Company, which took over the Geddes operations at the Buckland Mills in Waterloo. In 1898 he moved the plant to Botany. The Waterloo factory was repurposed for the production of tallow, and in 1900 the local board of health fined Hughes 40 shillings, in response to a petition from local residents complaining about "almost unbearable smells" from the rendering of fat. The tallow operation was not successful and the Waterloo factory was auctioned off.

In 1908, Hughes combined his business ventures into F. W. Hughes Limited with himself as managing director. His holdings included the Colonial Wholesale Meat Co. Ltd, which engaged in meat processing, fellmongering, tanning, and the manufacture of glue. His Colonial Combing, Spinning and Weaving Company was formed in partnership with E. A. Coghlan and benefited from the federal government's introduction of a bounty for the production of wool top. This allowed for an expansion into the wool export market and by 1914 the company had an output of 3,000,000 pounds (1,400,000 kg), which doubled during World War I. Hughes' processing facilities at Botany had 1,000 employees and covered almost 13 acres (5.3 ha).

Hughes employed former prime minister Chris Watson as a lobbyist and maintained good relations with the Australian Textile Workers' Union. After World War I he visited Japan and secured a substantial contract for wool tops, also exporting to Canada, China, Mexico, Greece and England. He expanded into grazing in 1925 with the acquisition of Welbondongah, near Moree, New South Wales, and later bought properties near Wagga Wagga, Tumut, and Kooba. He reputedly had over 600,000 sheep by the end of World War II.

== Personal life ==
Hughes married Matilda Morris (née Hawthorne) in Sydney on 7 September 1898. He was widowed in 1935 and died at his home in Edgecliff on 18 August 1950.

=== Racehorses ===
Hughes bought his first racehorses after the death of his wife and began a thoroughbred stud at Kooba. He owned over 300 horses and produced 270 winners. He notably won the Metropolitan Handicap (Dashing Cavalier, 1941; Nightbream, 1944), the Melbourne Cup (Hiraji, 1947), The Thousand Guineas (Nizam's Ring, 1947), The Oaks (Nizam's Ring, 1947; Grey Nurse, 1948), and the Breeders' Plate (Nirandoll, 1949). He was not able to attend his Melbourne Cup victory due to ill health.
