= Noel McGrowdie =

Australian jockey (1920–1961)

Personal information
- Full name: Noel Leonard McGrowdie
- Nickname: Digger
- Born: 25 December 1920 Brisbane, Queensland, Australia
- Died: 9 September 1961 (aged 40) Parit Buntar, Perak, Malaya
- Resting place: Randwick Cemetery; Sydney, New South Wales, Australia
- Occupation: Jockey

Horse racing career
- Sport: Horse racing

Major racing wins
- Brisbane Cup (1947, 1950); Melbourne Cup (1957); Sydney Cup (1951, 1952, 1958); Singapore Gold Cup (1960)

Honours
- Australian Racing Hall of Fame

Noel Leonard "Digger" McGrowdie (25 December 1920 – 9 September 1961) was an Australian jockey, best known for riding Straight Draw to victory at the 1957 Melbourne Cup.

== Biography ==
McGrowdie was born at Breakfast Creek in Brisbane, Queensland. His father, Charles Christopher McGrowdie, was a jockey-turned-racehorse trainer. He finished schooling at St Mary's Christian Brothers' College, Toowoomba.

McGrowdie won the Doomben Cup (1943), Brisbane Cup (1947 and 1950) and Stradbroke Handicap (1952) in Brisbane. After moving to Sydney in 1943, he won the Epsom Handicap (1943), Metropolitan (1944, 1945 and 1957), Sydney Cup (1951, 1952 and 1958) and Doncaster Handicap (1955 and 1958). In Melbourne, he won the Oakleigh Plate (1948, 1954 and 1956), Newmarket Handicap (1954) and most notably the Melbourne Cub (1957).

In 1960, McGrowdie left Australia on a riding contract in Malaya (now Malaysia). That same year, he won the Singapore Gold Cup.

McGrowdie died in a road accident on 9 September 1961 in Parit Buntar, Perak, Malaya. He was 40. He was survived by his wife, son and daughter. He was buried at Randwick Cemetery in the Sydney suburb of South Coogee.
