= Jack Purtell =

Australian jockey (1921–2017)

John Michael Purtell
Personal information
- Born: 1921
- Died: 8 March 2017 (aged 95) Sunshine Coast, Queensland, Australia
- Occupation: Jockey

Horse racing career
- Sport: Horse racing

Racing awards
- Inductee to the Australian Racing Hall of Fame

Significant horses
- Hiraji; Wodalla; Rising Fast

John Michael Purtell (1921 – 8 March 2017) was an Australian jockey who rode three Melbourne Cup winners.

== Career ==
Purtell, also known as 'Gentleman Jack’, rode his first race in 1936 at the age of 15. He was an apprentice jockey to Ted Temby at his Mordialloc, Victoria stables. He won his first race on Bonus at Mentone, Victoria in April 1937. Purtell rode more than 1700 winners including three Melbourne Cups. He was suspended only once. The best horse he rode was Comic Court to 19 wins even though he opted not to ride it in the 1950 Melbourne Cup. He won seven Melbourne Jockey Premierships – 1946/47, 1948/49, 1949/50, 1950/51, 1954/55, 1960/61 and 1961/62. In January 1953, he suffered severe head injuries in a race fall at Caulfield Racecourse.

Purtell rode Fighting Force when it triple dead-heated with both Pandie Sun and Ark Royal in the 1956 Hotham Handicap, a rare event in racing.

He retired in 1966 at the age of 45 and he became a Stipendiary Steward at the Victorian Racing Club until March 1981.

Purtell married in 1949 to Norma Giles and seven thousand people turned up to the church in Clifton Hill, Victoria. He died on the Sunshine Coast, Queensland on 8 March 2017, aged 95. Purtell and his wife had two children, Garry and Mark.

He was inducted into the Australian Racing Hall of Fame in 2004. A sculpture of Purtell by John Frith is held by the National Portrait Gallery in Canberra.

== Major wins ==
- Melbourne Cup – Hiraji (1947), Wodalla (1953), Rising Fast (1954)
- Cox Plate – Alister (1950), Bronton (1951), Rising Fast (1954), Ray Ribbon (1956)
- Caulfield Cup – Velocity (1941)
