= Kingston Town Stakes =

- Class: Group 2
- Location: Randwick Racecourse; Sydney, Australia
- Inaugurated: 1948
- Race type: Thoroughbred - flat
- Sponsor: Asahi Super Dry (2026)

Race information
- Distance: 2,000 metres
- Surface: Turf
- Track: Right-handed
- Qualification: Three year old and older
- Weight: Set weights and penalties
- Purse: A$300,000 (2026)
- Bonuses: Winner is exempt from ballot in The Metropolitan

The Kingston Town Stakes is an Australian Turf Club Group 2 Thoroughbred horse race at set weights and penalties for horses aged three years old and older, over a distance of 2000 metres. It is held annually at Randwick Racecourse, Sydney, Australia in September.

== History ==
The race is named in honour of the champion Kingston Town, who also won this race as the STC Cup twice.

=== Name ===
- 1948–1983 - STC Cup
- 1984 onwards - Kingston Town Stakes

=== Grade ===
- 1946–1978 - Principal Race
- 1979–1989 - Group 2
- 1990–2025 - Group 3
- 2026 onwards - Group 2

=== Distance ===
- 1948–1971 - 1 1/2 miles (~2400 metres)
- 1972–1990 - 2400 metres
- 1991 - 1900 metres
- 1992 - onwards 2000 metres

=== Venue ===
- 1991 - Race held at Canterbury Park

== Winners ==
The following are past winners of the race.

- 2026 - The Euphrates
- 2025 - Birdman
- 2024 - Eliyass
- 2023 - Just Fine
- 2022 - Alegron
- 2021 - She's Ideel
- 2020 - Taikomochi
- 2019 - Finche
- 2018 - Avilius
- 2017 - Libran
- 2016 - McCreery
- 2015 - Silverball
- 2014 - He's Your Man
- 2013 - Prince Cheri
- 2012 - Stout Hearted
- 2011 - Lamasery
- 2010 - Herculian Prince
- 2009 - Ready To Lift
- 2008 - Hurrah
- 2007 - †race not held
- 2006 - Mr Martini
- 2005 - Stormhill
- 2004 - Just Polite
- 2003 - Ariante
- 2002 - Dress Circle
- 2001 - Swiss Echo
- 2000 - Dashing Scene
- 1999 - Vita Man
- 1998 - Greenmailer
- 1997 - Classy Fella
- 1996 - Yobro
- 1995 - Balmeressa
- 1994 - Century Reign
- 1993 - Never Say
- 1992 - Regal Sea
- 1991 - Lord Revenir
- 1990 - Brixton Town
- 1989 - Copatonic
- 1988 - Kruthoffer
- 1987 - Easy Life
- 1986 - Wineglass
- 1985 - Pekamagess
- 1984 - Our Compromise
- 1983 - Tulsa Knight
- 1982 - Lordship
- 1981 - Kingston Town
- 1980 - Kingston Town
- 1979 - French Command
- 1978 - Lavache
- 1977 - Saramore
- 1976 - Gold and Black
- 1975 - Nourishing
- 1974 - History
- 1973 - Analie
- 1972 - With A Will
- 1971 - Tails
- 1970 - Regal Jane
- 1969 - Tails
- 1968 - Pirate Bird
- 1967 - El Gordo
- 1966 - Clovelly
- 1965 - Amusement Park
- 1964 - Piper's Son
- 1963 - Alpensea
- 1962 - River Seine
- 1961 - Sharply
- 1960 - Valerius
- 1959 - Valerius
- 1958 - Monte Carlo
- 1957 - Aqua Boy
- 1956 - Advocate
- 1955 - Sobriquet
- 1954 - Sir Pilot
- 1953 - Alinga
- 1952 - Aristocrat
- 1951 - Yeoval
- 1950 - Carapooe
- 1949 - Foxzami
- 1948 - Columnist

† Not held because of outbreak of equine influenza

== See also ==
- Bill Ritchie Handicap
- Tea Rose Stakes
- The Shorts
- Kingston Town Classic (now the Northerly Stakes, Perth)
- List of Australian Group races
- Group races
