= Macdougal =

New Zealand-bred Thoroughbred racehorse

- Sire: Marco Polo
- Grandsire: Le Pacha
- Dam: Lady Fox
- Damsire: Foxbridge
- Sex: Gelding
- Foaled: 1953
- Died: 1979
- Country: New Zealand
- Colour: Bay
- Breeder: Seton Otway
- Owner: R. N. Brown
- Trainer: Dick Roden

Major wins
- AJC Metropolitan Handicap (1959); Brisbane Cup (1959); Melbourne Cup (1959)

Macdougal (1953−1979) was a New Zealand thoroughbred racehorse bred by Seton Otway at Trelawney Stud in Cambridge who is notable for winning the 1959 Melbourne Cup.

In the Melbourne Cup at Flemington Racecourse he was ridden by Pat Glennon and carried a weight of 8-11 (123 pounds). Macdougal started at odds of 8/1 in a field of 28 runners and won the cup by three lengths.

== See also ==
- List of Melbourne Cup winners
