= Seton Otway =

New Zealand racehorse owner and breeder

Leonard Seton Otway (6 February 1894 – 29 January 1989) was a New Zealand racehorse owner and breeder. He was born in Mount Eden, Auckland, New Zealand in 1894.

In 1930, Otway established Trelawney Stud in Cambridge, New Zealand's longest running commercial thoroughbred stud which has stood some of the leading sires such as Foxbridge who won 11 consecutive stallion premierships and in 2008 was inducted into the New Zealand Racing Hall of Fame.

In 2016, Otway was inducted into the New Zealand Racing Hall of Fame.

== See also ==
- Thoroughbred racing in New Zealand
