= Hi Jinx =

New Zealand-bred Thoroughbred racehorse

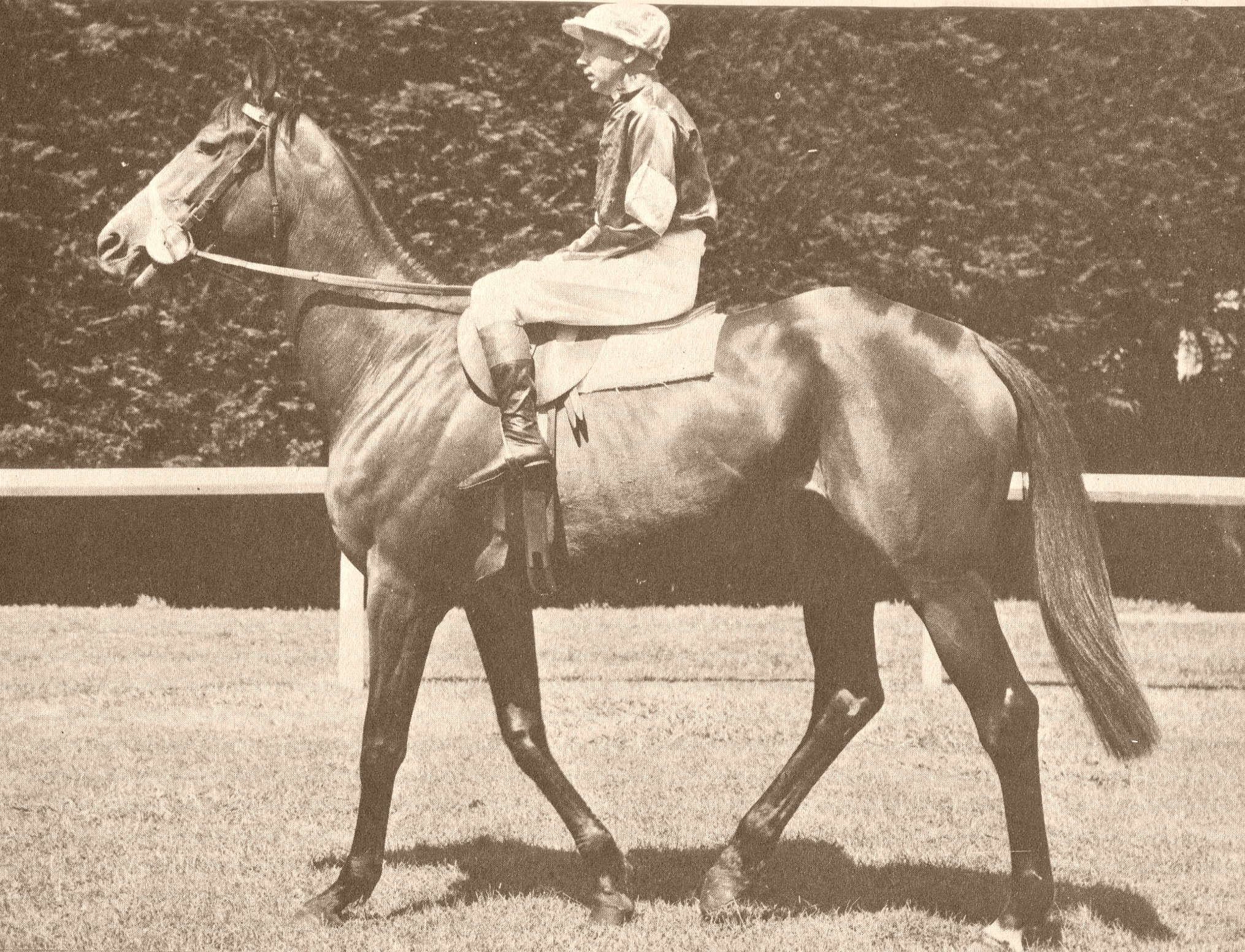
- Hi Jinx (NZ)
- Sire: Pride of Kildare
- Grandsire: Royal Charger
- Dam: Lady's Bridge
- Damsire: Foxbridge
- Sex: Mare
- Foaled: 1955; Cambridge, New Zealand
- Died: 1979
- Country: New Zealand
- Colour: Bay
- Breeder: Seton Otway
- Owner: Trevor H. Knowles
- Trainer: Trevor H. Knowles

Major wins
- Melbourne Cup (1960)

Hi Jinx (1955−1979) was a New Zealand-bred Thoroughbred racemare which won the Centenary Melbourne Cup in 1960, at the odds of 50 to 1.

== Pedigree ==
Hi Jinx was bred by the estate of C.J Casey senior and foaled at Trelawney Stud, Cambridge. She was sired by the non-winner, but good sire, Pride of Kildare (IRE), her dam was the Great Northern Oaks winner, Lady's Bridge by the leading sire, Foxbridge (GB) out of Miss Ridicule by The Ace (GB). Pride of Kildare was imported into New Zealand by Seton Otway and sired 15 stakes-winners that won 36 stakes races before he was exported to Japan. Hi Jinx was a half-sister to Erin's Bridge (dam of the stakes-winner, Marchere). She was inbred to Bayardo in the fourth generation (4mx4f).

== Race record ==
She was sold for 500 guineas and raced in the partnership of Trevor H. Knowles and K.R. Sly.

Hi Jinx was trained by her part owner, Trevor H. Knowles. Her record was undistinguished prior to going to Australia. There she was unplaced in the Caulfield Cup before finishing second in the Moonee Valley Cup. Hi Jinx was allotted 7 stone 10 pounds in the Centenary Melbourne Cup and ridden by William A. Smith. The field of 32 included the champion racehorse Tulloch who finished seventh. Hi Jinx started at 50/1 and defeated the New Zealand-bred horses Howsie and Ilumquh by a half head, and a neck in 3.23¾.

== Stud record ==
She is known to have produced:

- 1963 a filly Centinx by Comte De Grasse (USA) (third dam of Robyn's Faffair, which won the Group 3, Winter Cup Handicap)
- 1968 a filly Royal Service by Alcimedes (GB)

== See also ==
List of Melbourne Cup winners
