= Foxzami =

New Zealand-bred Thoroughbred racehorse

- Sire: Nizami
- Grandsire: Firdaussi
- Dam: Honeywood
- Damsire: Foxbridge
- Sex: Stallion
- Foaled: 1944
- Died: 1969
- Country: New Zealand
- Colour: Bay
- Breeder: N. R. Souter
- Owner: L. G. Robinson
- Trainer: Dan Lewis

Major wins
- Melbourne Cup (1949); Hotham Handicap (1949); STC Cup (1949)

Foxzami (1944−1969) was a New Zealand-bred Thoroughbred racehorse.

In November 1949 at Flemington Racecourse, Foxzami won the Melbourne Cup. He carried a weight of 8-8 (120 pounds) and started at odds of 16/1 in a field of 31 runners. Ridden by Billy Fellows, he won the cup by three lengths.

== See also ==
- List of Melbourne Cup winners
