= Polo Prince =

New Zealand-bred Thoroughbred racehorse

- Sire: Marco Polo (FR)
- Grandsire: Le Pacha (FR)
- Dam: Sou’ East (NZ)
- Damsire: Ruthless (GB)
- Sex: Gelding
- Foaled: 1958
- Died: 1973
- Country: New Zealand
- Colour: Bay
- Owner: Mr & Mrs Laurie W Davis
- Trainer: John P Carter

Major wins
- Melbourne Cup (1964)
- Last updated on 30 December 2012

Polo Prince (1958−1973) was a New Zealand Thoroughbred racehorse who won the 1964 Melbourne Cup.

Having run an excellent fourth in the VRC Mackinnon Stakes and allotted just 8 st 3 lb (52 kg) for the cup he was backed from 20/1 to 12/1 to win the race which he did in near record time.

He died in 1973 after being struck by a car.
