= Hiraji =

New Zealand-bred Thoroughbred racehorse

- Sire: Nizami
- Grandsire: Firdaussi
- Dam: Duvach
- Damsire: Foxbridge
- Sex: Gelding
- Foaled: 1943
- Died: 1970
- Country: New Zealand
- Colour: Grey
- Breeder: George Cobb
- Owner: F. W. Hughes
- Trainer: Jim McCurley

Major wins
- Melbourne Cup (1947)

Hiraji (NZ), (1943−1970), was a New Zealand-bred Thoroughbred racehorse best known for winning the Melbourne Cup.

Hiraji was a grey gelding sired by Nizami (Fr) out of Duvach by Foxbridge (GB). He was bred in 1943 at Duvach Lodge, Matamata, New Zealand.

Hiraji was owned by F. W. Hughes and trained by J.W. McCurley. In the 1947 Melbourne Cup he carried a weight of 7-11 (109 pounds and was ridden by Jack Purtell. Starting at odds of 12/1 in a field of 30 runners he won the cup by half a length from Fresh Boy.

== See also ==
- Thoroughbred racing in New Zealand
- Thoroughbred racing in Australia
- List of Melbourne Cup winners
