= The Metropolitan (ATC) =

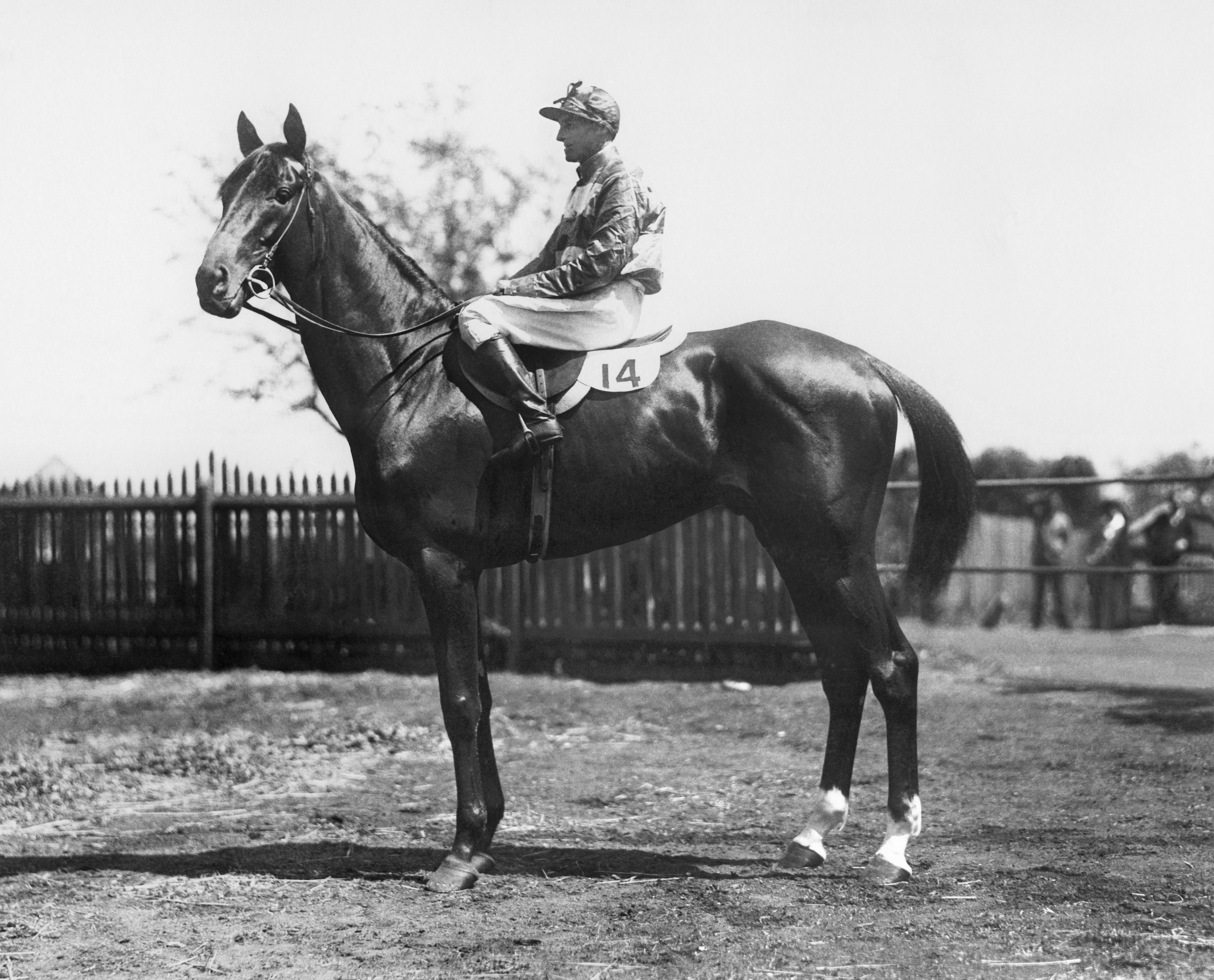
- Denis Boy, 1932 winner
- Class: Group 2
- Location: Randwick Racecourse, Sydney, Australia
- Inaugurated: 1863
- Race type: Thoroughbred - flat
- Sponsor: Asahi (2026)

Race information
- Distance: 2,400 metres
- Surface: Turf
- Track: Right-handed
- Qualification: Horses three years old and older
- Weight: Handicap
- Purse: A$750,000 (2026)
- Bonuses: Winner exemption from a ballot on the Queen Elizabeth Stakes

The Metropolitan is an Australian Turf Club Group 2 Thoroughbred horse race held under open handicap conditions, for horses aged three years old and older, over a distance of 2,400 metres at Randwick Racecourse, Sydney, Australia in early October.

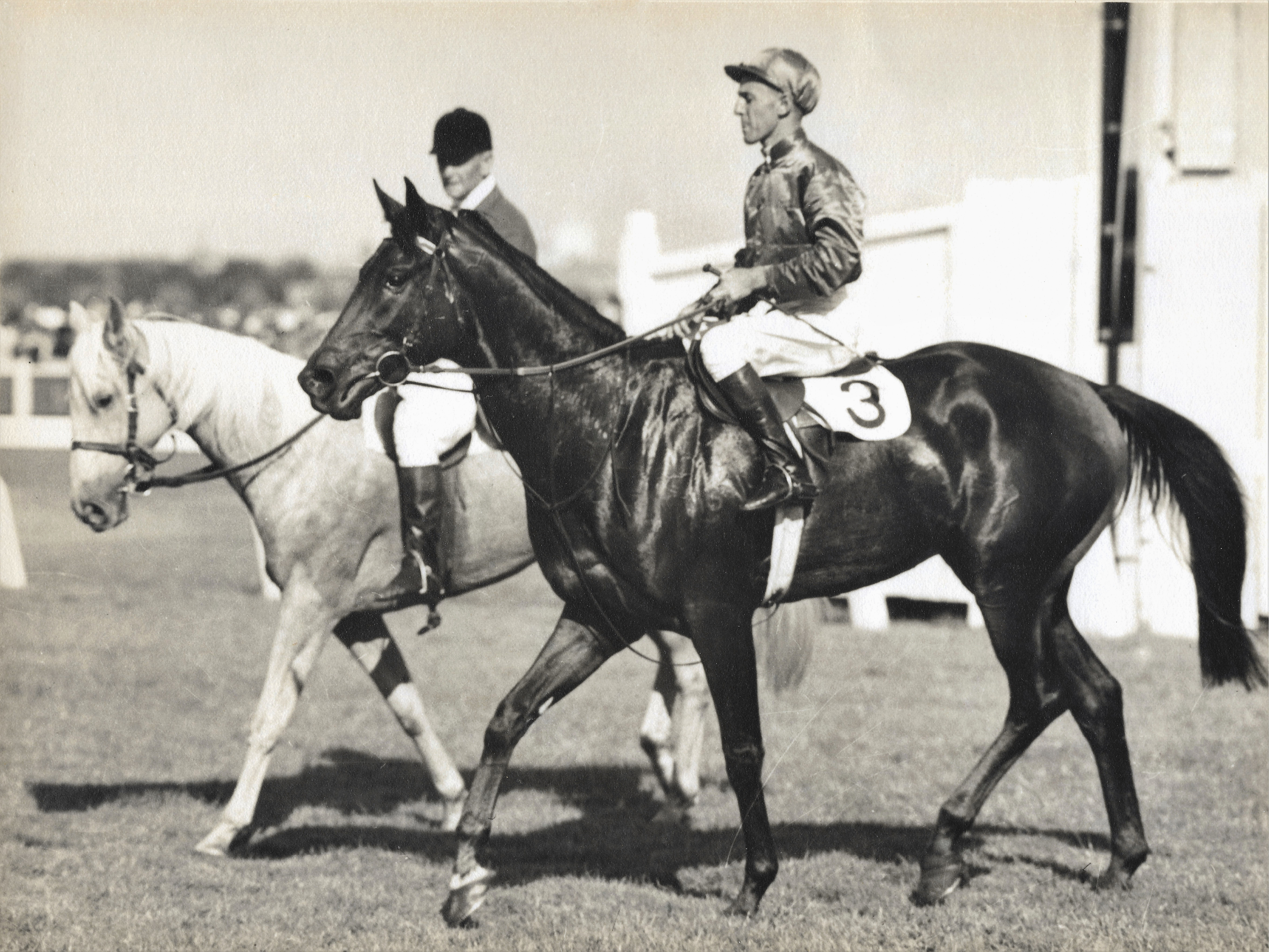
Delta,1951 winner

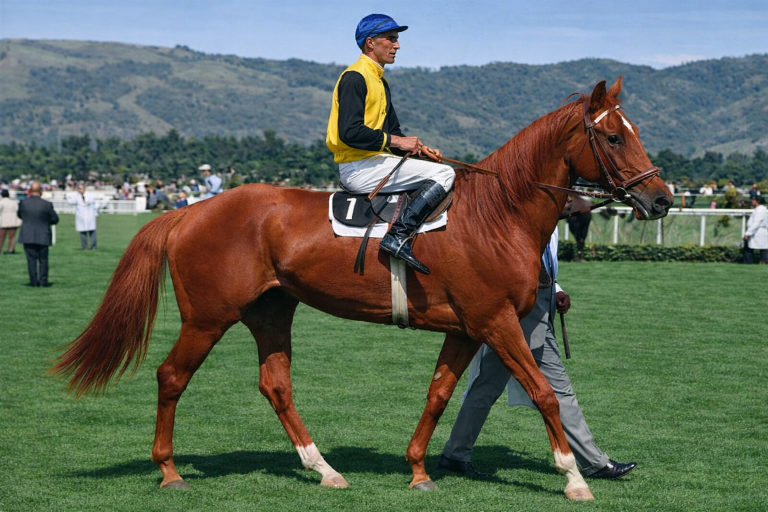
Redcraze, 1956 winner

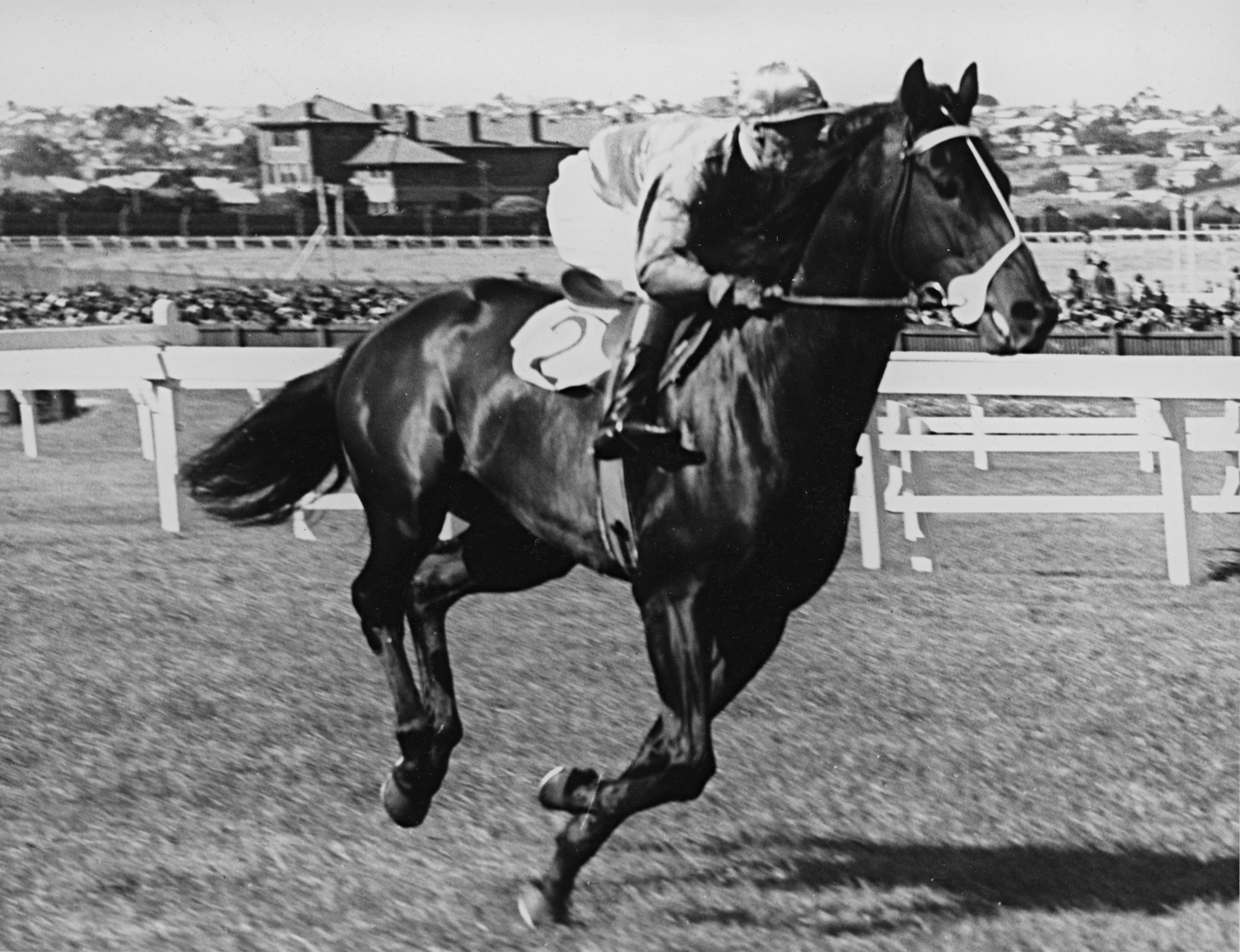
Beau Vite, 1940 winner

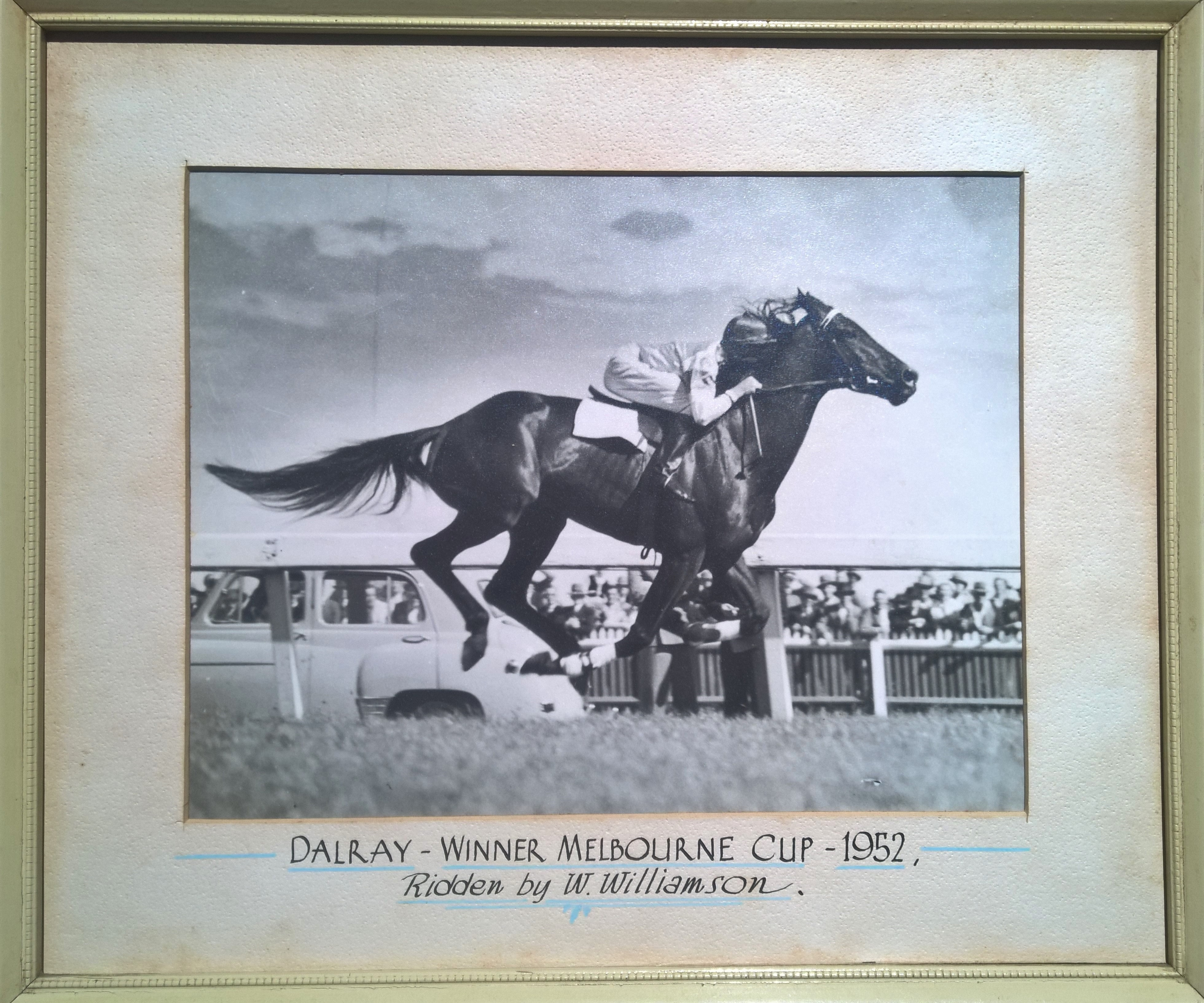
Dalray, 1952 winner

== History ==
The race when first run in 1863 was known as the Great Metropolitan Stakes. It is one of the main races in the Sydney Spring Carnival held in early October at Randwick Racecourse, along with the Epsom Handicap.

Many great household names have won this race, but none have won the treble of The Metropolitan, Caulfield Cup and Melbourne Cup. Prior to 2004 the race was run on the first Monday in October, the Labour Day holiday.

After Asian Pattern Committee review, The Metropolitan downgraded to Group 2 from 2026.

=== Name ===
- 1863–1888 - Great Metropolitan Stakes
- 1889–1897 - Metropolitan Stakes
- 1898–1978 - Metropolitan Handicap
- 1979 onwards - The Metropolitan

=== Grade ===
- 1863–1978 - Principal Race
- 1979–2025 - Group 1
- 2026 onwards - Group 2

=== Distance ===
- 1863–1891 – 2 miles (~3200 metres)
- 1891–1919 - 1 1/2 miles (~2400 metres)
- 1920–1971 - 1 5/8 miles (~2600 metres)
- 1972–1982 – 2600 metres
- 1983 – 2400 metres
- 1984–2000 – 2600 metres
- 2001 onwards - 2400 metres

=== Venue ===
The race has been the major long distance event in the Sydney Spring Racing Carnival and has been run at Randwick Racecourse, with one exception in 1983 when the race was run at Warwick Farm Racecourse.

=== 1942 racebook ===
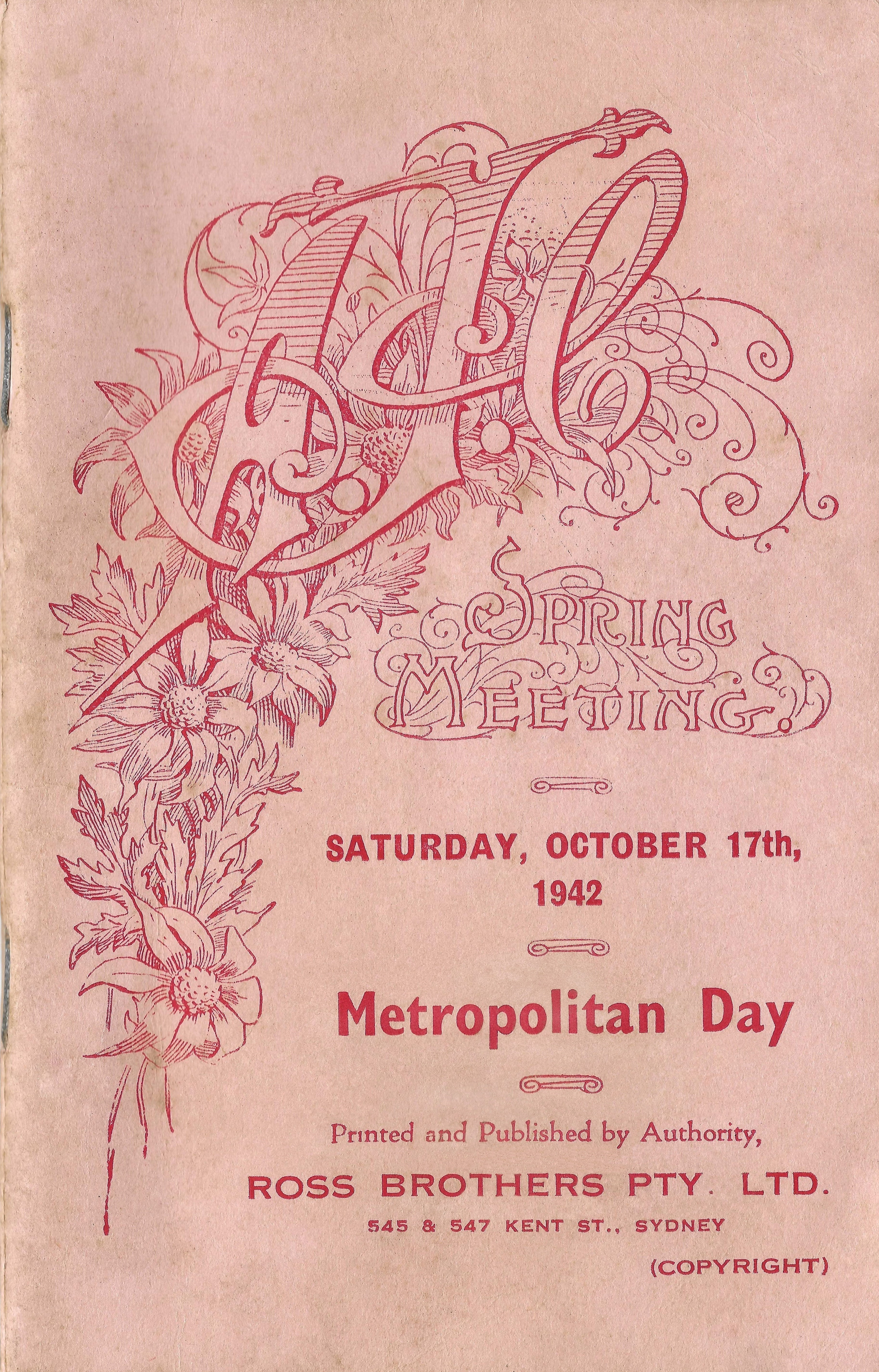
1942 AJC Metropolitan Handicap racebook front cover

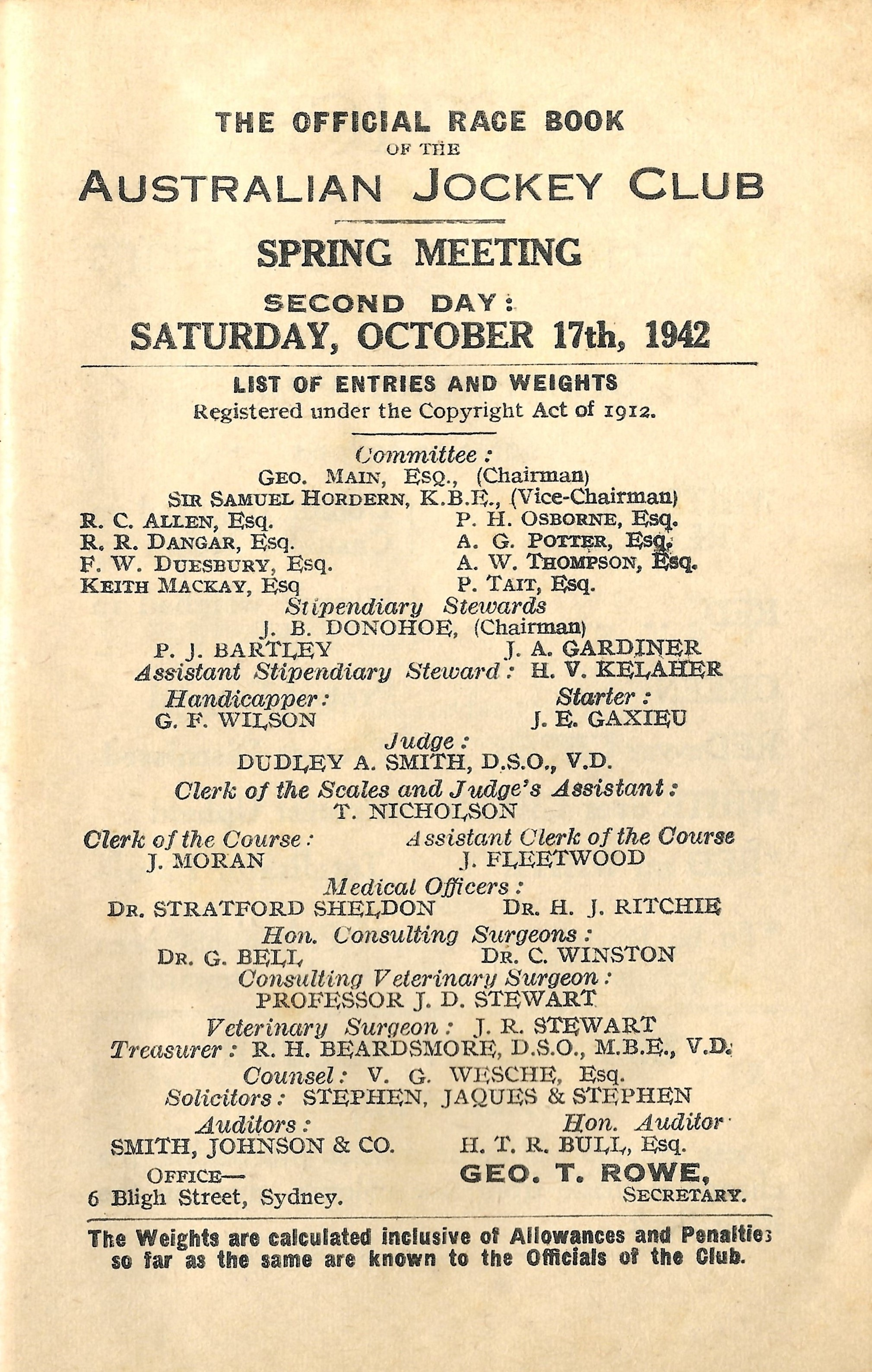
1942 AJC Metropolitan Handicap showing raceday officials

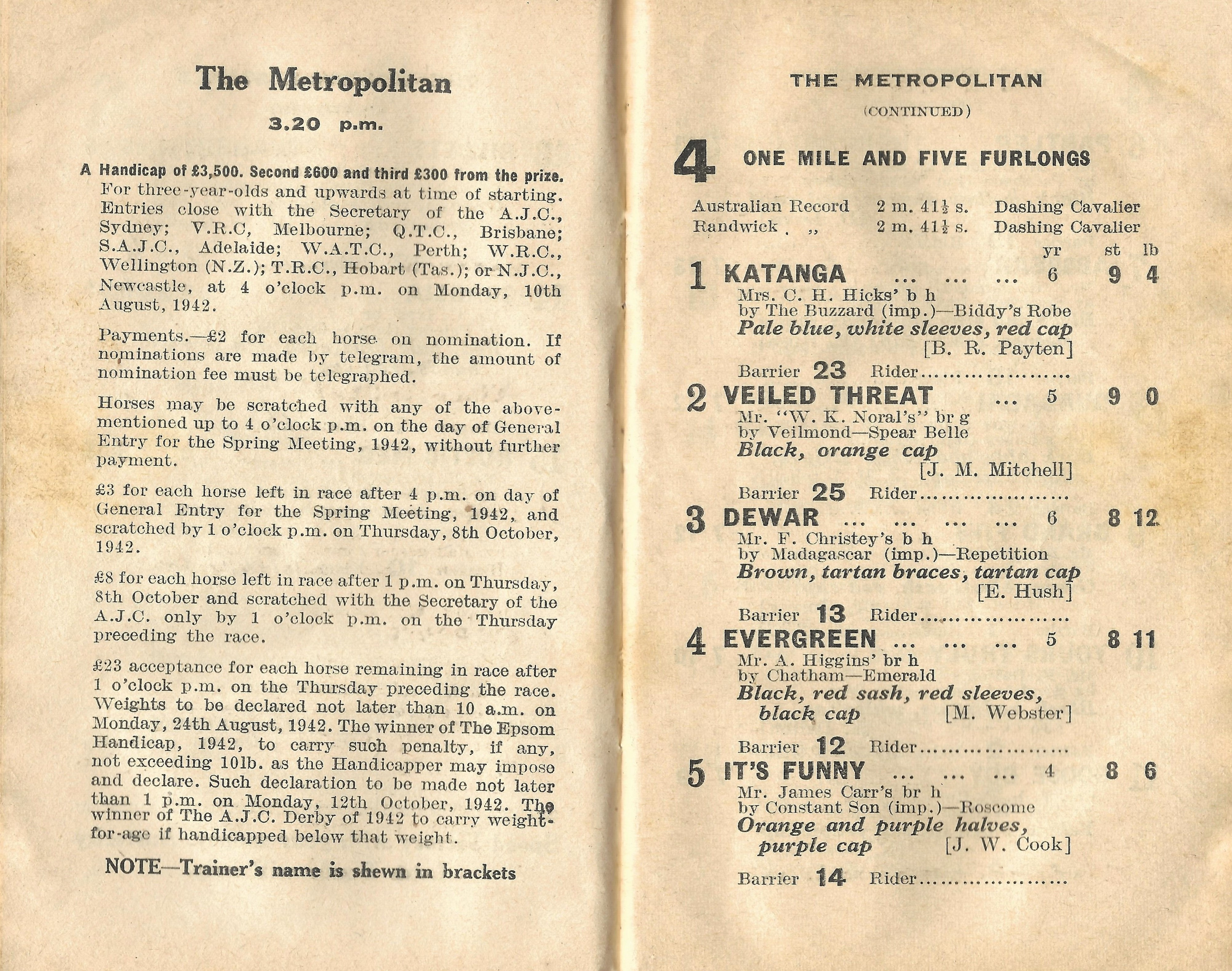
1942 AJC Metropolitan Handicap starters and results

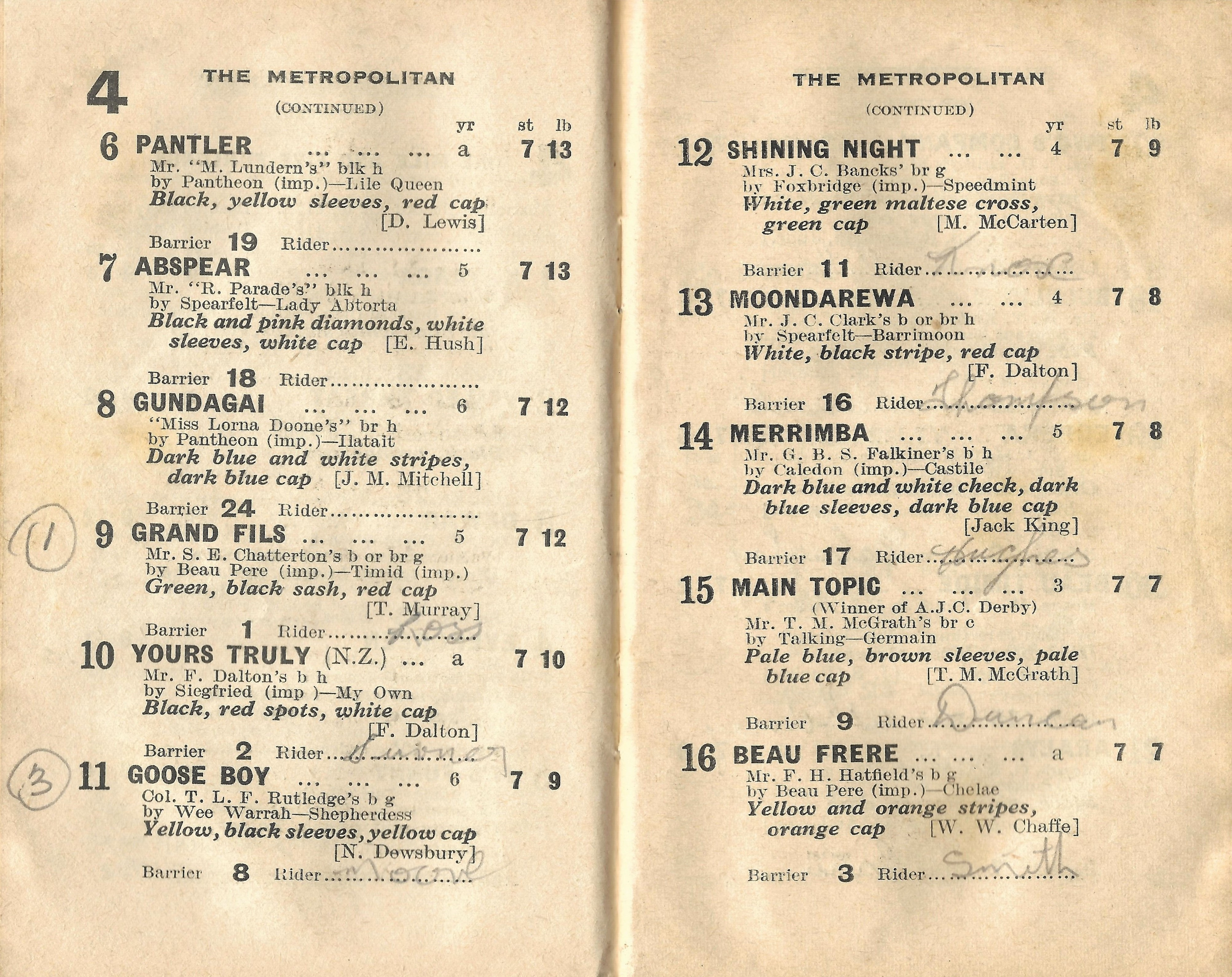
1942 AJC Metropolitan Handicap showing the winner, Grand Fils

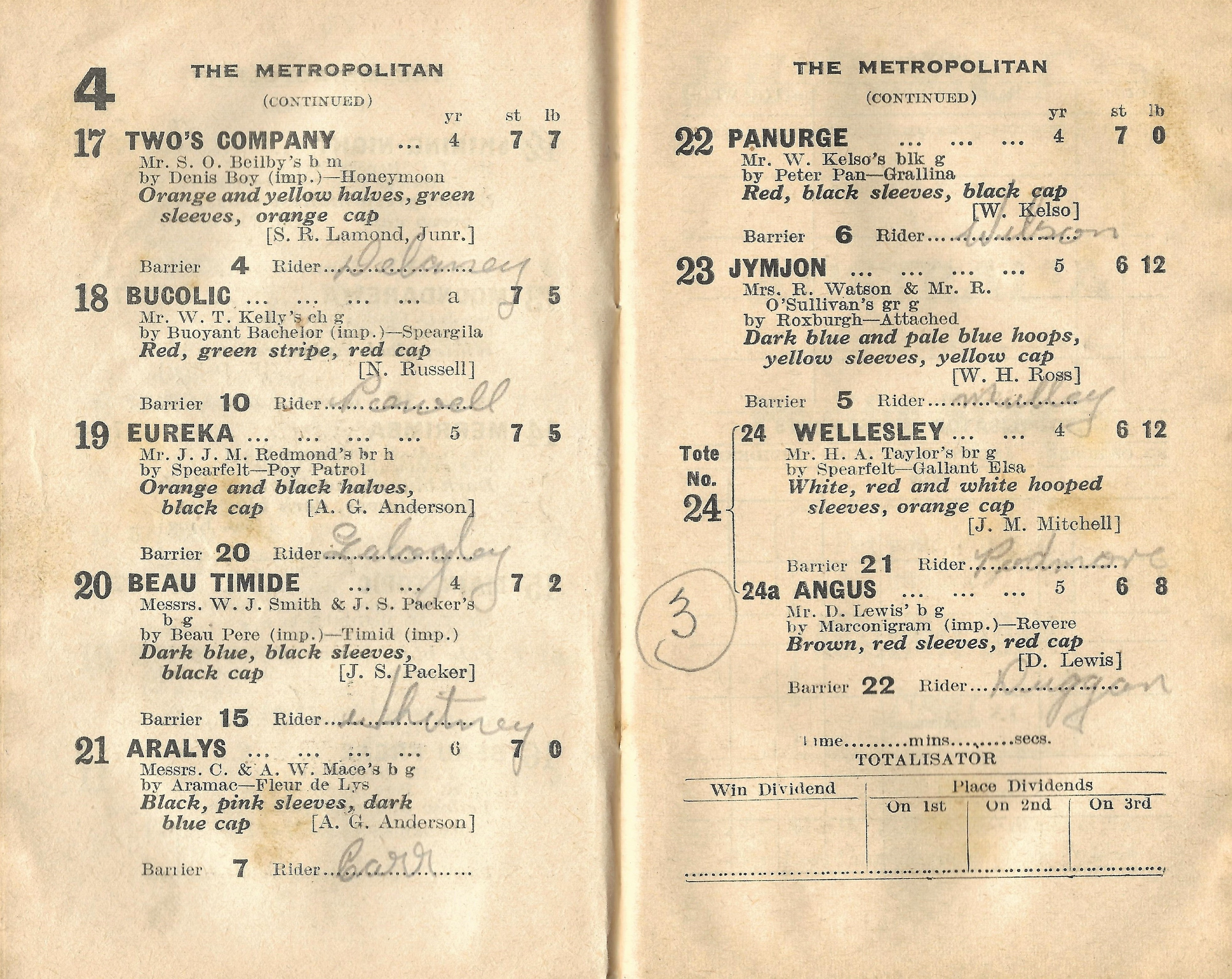
1942 AJC Metropolitan Handicap starters and results

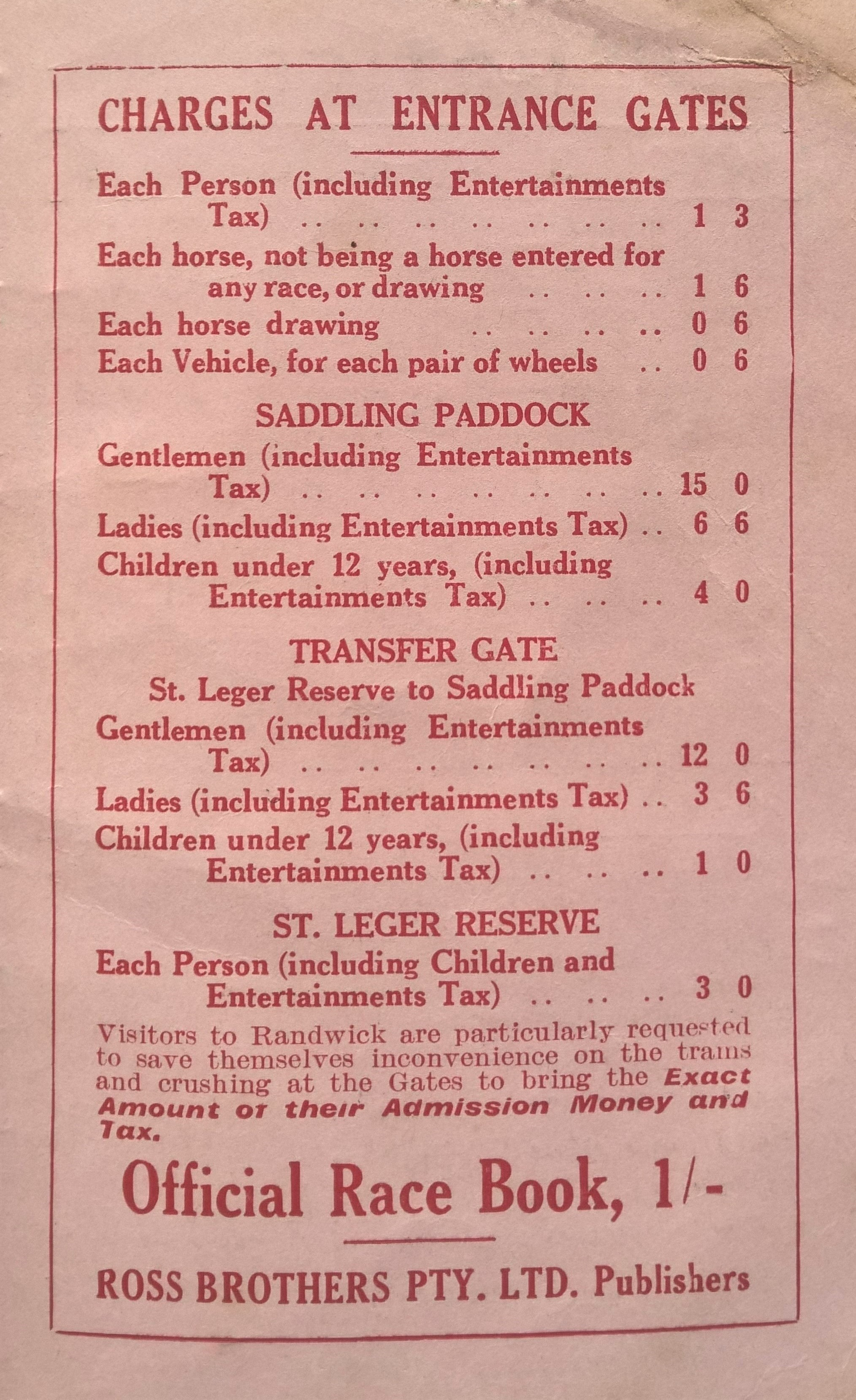
Back cover showing charges at the entrance gates

== Winners ==
The following are past winners of the race.

- 2026 - Juja Kibo
- 2025 - Royal Supremacy
- 2024 - Land Legend
- 2023 - Just Fine
- 2022 - No Compromise
- 2021 - Montefilia
- 2020 - Mirage Dancer
- 2019 - Come Play With Me
- 2018 - Patrick Erin
- 2017 - Foundry
- 2016 - Sir John Hawkwood
- 2015 - Magic Hurricane
- 2014 - Opinion
- 2013 - Seville
- 2012 - Glencadam Gold
- 2011 - The Verminator
- 2010 - Herculian Prince
- 2009 - Speed Gifted
- 2008 - Newport
- 2007 - †race not held
- 2006 - Tawqeet
- 2005 - Railings
- 2004 - County Tyrone
- 2003 - Bedouin
- 2002 - Victory Smile
- 2001 - Dress Circle
- 2000 - Coco Cobanna
- 1999 - Vita Man
- 1998 - In Joyment
- 1997 - Heart Ruler
- 1996 - Hula Flight
- 1995 - Electronic
- 1994 - Glastonbury
- 1993 - Zamination
- 1992 - Te Akau Nick
- 1991 - Lord Revenir
- 1990 - Donegal Mist
- 1989 - Hunter
- 1988 - Natski
- 1987 - Balciano
- 1986 - Born To Be Queen
- 1985 - Spritely Native
- 1984 - Hayai
- 1983 - Hayai
- 1982 - Nicholas John
- 1981 - Belmura Lad
- 1980 - Brindisi
- 1979 - Earthquake McGoon
- 1978 - Ming Dynasty
- 1977 - Sir Serene
- 1976 - Battle Heights
- 1975 - Bon Teint
- 1974 - Passetreul
- 1973 - Analie
- 1972 - Altai Khan
- 1971 - Oncidon
- 1970 - Tails
- 1969 - Tails
- 1968 - Wiedersehen
- 1967 - General Command
- 1966 - Duo
- 1965 - Striking Force
- 1964 - Piper's Son
- 1963 - Galerus
- 1962 - The Dip
- 1961 - Waipari
- 1960 - Red Wind
- 1959 - Macdougal
- 1958 - Monte Carlo
- 1957 - Straight Draw
- 1956 - Redcraze
- 1955 - Beaupa
- 1954 - Commodore
- 1953 - Carioca
- 1952 - Dalray
- 1951 - Delta
- 1950 - Conductor
- 1949 - Count Cyrano
- 1948 - Buonarroti Boy
- 1947 - Murray Stream
- 1946 - Cordale
- 1945 - Murray Stream
- 1944 - Nightbeam
- 1943 - Main Topic
- 1942 - Grand Fils
- 1941 - Dashing Cavalier
- 1940 - Beau Vite
- 1939 - Feminist
- 1938 - Royal Chief
- 1937 - Sir Regent
- 1936 - Young Crusader
- 1935 - Oro
- 1934 - Waikare
- 1933 - Regal Son
- 1932 - Denis Boy
- 1931 - Strength
- 1930 - Cragford
- 1929 - Loquacious
- 1928 - Jocelyn
- 1927 - Murillo
- 1926 - Star Stranger
- 1925 - Bard Of Avon
- 1924 - Polycletan
- 1923 - Sir Andrew
- 1922 - Speciality
- 1921 - Laddie Blue
- 1920 - Pershore
- 1919 - Rebus
- 1918 - Kennaquhair
- 1917 - Cagou
- 1916 - Quinologist
- 1915 - St. Carwyne
- 1914 - St. Spasa
- 1913 - Cagou
- 1912 - Duke Foote
- 1911 - Malt King
- 1910 - Eric
- 1909 - Maltine
- 1908 - Mooltan
- 1907 - Mooltan
- 1906 - Solution (NZ)
- 1905 - Maniapoto
- 1904 - Alias
- 1903 - Marvel Loch
- 1902 - Queen Of Sheba
- 1901 - San Fran
- 1900 - Reviver
- 1899 - Cremona
- 1898 - Cravat
- 1897 - Survivor
- 1896 - The Skipper
- 1895 - Nobleman
- 1894 - Projectile
- 1893 - Paris
- 1892 - Althotas
- 1891 - Yowi
- 1890 - Little Bernie
- 1889 - Abercorn
- 1888 - Lamond
- 1887 - Cardigan
- 1886 - The Bohemian
- 1885 - Acolyte
- 1884 - Sir Modred
- 1883 - The Gem
- 1882 - Masquerade
- 1881 - Hesperian
- 1880 - The Pontiff
- 1879 - Secundus
- 1878 - Democrat
- 1877 - Amendment
- 1876 - Nemesis
- 1875 - Goldsbrough
- 1874 - Sterling
- 1873 - Horatio
- 1872 - Dagworth
- 1871 - Rosebud
- 1870 - Croydon
- 1869 - Circassian
- 1868 - The Barb
- 1867 - Tim Whiffler
- 1866 - Bylong
- 1865 - Volunteer
- 1864 - Tarragon
- 1863 - Regno

† Not held because of outbreak of equine influenza

== See also ==
- Breeders' Plate
- Epsom Handicap
- Flight Stakes
- Gimcrack Stakes
- Premiere Stakes
- List of Australian Group races
- Group races
