= 2021 New Zealand Derby =

Race

The 2021 New Zealand Derby was a Group I horse race which took place at Ellerslie Racecourse on Sunday 7 March 2021. It was the 146th running of the New Zealand Derby, and it was won by Rocket Spade.

Because of restrictions around public gatherings following an outbreak of COVID-19 in Auckland, the race was run a day later than its original date and with a limited audience of owners and Auckland Racing Club members.

Rocket Spade became the second consecutive son of champion sire Fastnet Rock to win the Derby, following on from Sherwood Forest in 2020.

Bred by Sun Kingdom, Rocket Spade was sold for A$425,000 at the Inglis Sydney Easter Yearling Sale. He is owned by Hermitage Thoroughbreds, and trained by Lance O'Sullivan and Andrew Scott at Matamata. O'Sullivan was a two-time Derby winner as a jockey but had never previously won the race as a trainer, while Scott saddled Cut the Cake and Xcellent to win back-to-back runnings of the Derby in the early 2000s.

Rocket Spade had shown promise in the spring but had been slightly off the very best three-year-olds, finishing fourth in the Group 2 Sarten Memorial and fifth in the New Zealand 2000 Guineas. But he returned as a different horse in the new year, rising to Derby favouritism with strong victories in the Auckland Guineas and Avondale Guineas.

The Derby was run at a muddling speed, with several horses taking turns in the lead. The pace went right out of the race as they came down the side of the course, and the field bunched right up with less than six lengths covering the 14 runners. Rocket Spade had dropped back to last, but jockey Craig Grylls was happy to bide his time and stick to the inside part of the track.

A gap opened at the top of the straight and Rocket Spade made his move. Grylls drove him through that opening and he quickly surged into contention, with Milford and Frontman joining him in a three-way battle to the finish. Rocket Spade fought off those two rivals, reaching the line a short neck in front of Milford. Frontman finished another short head behind in third.

Rocket Spade made amends for Hermitage and the O'Sullivan/Scott team, who had finished fourth a year earlier with the Derby favourite Dragon Leap.

The race time, 2:35.51, was the second slowest time recorded in Derby history.

== Race details ==
- Sponsor: Vodafone New Zealand
- Prize money: NZ$1,000,000
- Track: Slow
- Number of runners: 14
- Winner's time: 2:35.51

== Full result ==
	Margin	Horse	Jockey	Trainer(s)	Odds
1		Rocket Spade	Craig Grylls	Lance O'Sullivan & Andrew Scott	$4.30
2	Short neck	Milford	Leith Innes	Stephen Marsh	$10.50
3	Short head	Frontman	Danielle Johnson	Murray Baker & Andrew Forsman	$13.10
4	½	Il Affare	Johnathan Parkes	Peter & Dawn Williams	$15.90
5	Head	Iffie Shows	Sam Weatherley	Steven Cole	$115.20
6	¾	Montre Moi	Lisa Allpress	Johno Benner & Hollie Wynyard	$4.70
7	Nose	Tokorangi	Andrew Calder	Michael Moroney & Pam Gerard	$6.30
8	1	Jason Belltree	Vinnie Colgan	Bruce Wallace & Grant Cooksley	$8.40
9	6½	Lord Ardmore	Michael McNab	Stephen McKee	$16.50
10	1½	Tribute King	Ryan Elliott	Shaune Ritchie & Colm Murray	$63.80
11	1½	Grip	Sam Collett	Michael Moroney & Pam Gerard	$62.50
12	2	Tannahill	Jonathan Riddell	Andrew Campbell	$28.50
13	8	Perfect Scenario	Opie Bosson	Jamie Richards	$11.60
14	13	Edge Of Wonder	Wiremu Pinn	Team Rogerson	$104.00

== Winner's details ==
Further details of the winner, Rocket Spade:

- Foaled: 21 October 2017
- Sire: Fastnet Rock; Dam: Affairoftheheart (Fusaichi Pegasus)
- Owner: Hermitage Thoroughbreds Pty Ltd
- Trainer: Lance O'Sullivan & Andrew Scott
- Breeder: Sun Kingdom
- Starts: 8
- Wins: 4
- Seconds: 2
- Thirds: 0
- Earnings: $745,450

=== The road to the Derby ===
Early-season appearances prior to running in the 2021 Derby.

- Rocket Spade – 4th Sarten Memorial, 5th New Zealand 2000 Guineas, 1st Auckland Guineas, 1st Avondale Guineas
- Milford - 7th Bonecrusher Stakes, 1st Gingernuts Salver, 5th Avondale Guineas
- Frontman - 9th Levin Classic
- Il Affare - 6th Trevor Eagle Memorial, 3rd Royal Stakes, 4th David & Karyn Ellis Fillies' Classic, 6th Avondale Guineas
- Iffie Shows - 5th Trevor Eagle Memorial, 11th Waikato Guineas
- Montre Moi - 11th Trevor Eagle Memorial, 3rd Karaka Million 3YO Classic, 4th Waikato Guineas
- Tokorangi - 4th Gold Trail Stakes, 3rd Soliloquy Stakes, 5th New Zealand 1000 Guineas, 5th Uncle Remus Stakes, 4th Levin Classic, 1st Waikato Guineas
- Jason Belltree - 2nd Bonecrusher Stakes, 2nd Auckland Guineas, 2nd Avondale Guineas
- Lord Ardmore - 4th New Zealand 2000 Guineas, 7th Karaka Million 3YO Classic, 4th Avondale Guineas
- Tribute King - 7th Avondale Guineas
- Grip - 8th Trevor Eagle Memorial, 9th Avondale Guineas
- Tannahill - 4th Wanganui Guineas, 12th Karaka Million 3YO Classic, 5th Waikato Guineas
- Perfect Scenario - 4th Bonecrusher Stakes, 5th Karaka Million 3YO Classic, 3rd Waikato Guineas
- Edge Of Wonder - 7th Sarten Memorial, 4th Trevor Eagle Memorial, 7th Auckland Guineas, 3rd Gingernuts Salver, 16th Karaka Million 3YO Classic, 8th Avondale Guineas

=== Subsequent Group 1 wins ===
Subsequent wins at Group 1 level by runners in the 2021 New Zealand Derby.

== See also ==
- Recent winners of major NZ 3 year old races
