= 2014 New Zealand Derby =

The 2014 New Zealand Derby was a horse race which took place at Ellerslie Racecourse on Saturday 1 March 2014. It was the 139th running of the New Zealand Derby, and it was won by Puccini.

Puccini was the favourite for the race on the strength of impressive victories in the Great Northern Guineas, Waikato Guineas and Avondale Guineas. He showed a distinct fondness for front-running tactics in these victories, leading throughout and scoring emphatic victories. The same tactics were widely expected to be repeated in the Derby. But Puccini was slow out of the gates and was fourth last in the 18-horse field after the first 500m. He made a spectacular move halfway down the back stretch, sweeping to the lead. He kicked strongly at the turn and held on for an impressive and convincing two-length win over Rising Romance, with Glorious Lad another four lengths away in third.

Puccini's spectacular performance received a rapturous reception from the Ellerslie crowd, and prompted rider Michael Walker to declare that Puccini was the best horse he'd ever ridden.

Rising Romance made up ground from near the back of the field to finish second. She is by the same sire and trained by the same stable as 2013 Derby winner Habibi. Glorious Lad took third.

== Race details ==
- Sponsor: TV3
- Prize money: NZ$750,000
- Track: Good
- Number of runners: 18
- Winner's time: 2:28.39

== Full result ==
	Margin	Horse	Jockey	Trainer(s)	Odds
1		Puccini	Michael Walker	Peter & Jacob McKay	$3.20
2	2	Rising Romance	Michael Coleman	Donna & Dean Logan	$3.50
3	2½	Glorious Lad	Mark Du Plessis	Shaune Ritchie	$14.20
4	3¼	Kentucky Son	Trudy Thornton	Lee Somervell	$145.50
5	Neck	We'regoingtogetcha	Kelly Myers	David Hayes	$9.50
6	½	Fast Dragon	Johnathan Parkes	Bruce Wallace	$50.80
7	Neck	Chipandchase	Noel Harris	Stephen Marsh	$56.00
8	3	Maygrove	Chris Johnson	Murray Baker & Andrew Forsman	$25.60
9	½	Blizzard	Opie Bosson	Jeff McVean & Emma-Lee Browne	$33.80
10	¾	Thorn Pass	Danielle Johnson	Lisa Latta	$87.10
11	¼	Lucky Feather	Craig Grylls	Toby Autridge & Cyril Goodwin	$52.60
12	½	The Fire Inside	Mark Sweeney	Michael Moroney & Chad Ormsby	$50.80
13	¾	Colonel Carrera	Rory Hutchings	Graeme & Debbie Rogerson	$76.80
14	¼	Spellbinder	Matthew Cameron	Jason Bridgman	$7.10
15	½	Habitual Offender	Leith Innes	Michael Moroney & Chad Ormsby	$25.60
16	Neck	King Savinsky	Hayden Tinsley	Jason Bridgman	$100.20
17	9	Stand Your Ground	Vinnie Colgan	Donna & Dean Logan	$32.80
18	18	Mr Frankey	Sam Spratt	Lisa Latta	$60.30

== Winner's details ==
Further details of the winner, Puccini:

- Foaled: 25 September 2010 in New Zealand
- Sire: Encosta De Lago; Dam: Miss Opera (Paris Opera)
- Owner: Monovale Farm
- Trainer: Peter & Jacob McKay
- Breeder: Monovale Farm
- Starts: 14
- Wins: 5
- Seconds: 1
- Thirds: 3
- Earnings: $676,925

=== The road to the Derby ===
Early-season appearances in 2013–14 prior to running in the Derby.

- Puccini – 4th New Zealand 2000 Guineas, 1st Great Northern Guineas, 4th Levin Classic, 1st Waikato Guineas, 1st Avondale Guineas
- Rising Romance – 1st Trevor Eagle Memorial, 3rd Eight Carat Classic, 1st Royal Stakes, 2nd Avondale Guineas
- Glorious Lad – 2nd Wellington Stakes, 4th Waikato Guineas, 3rd Avondale Guineas
- Kentucky Son – 4th Trevor Eagle Memorial, 9th Great Northern Guineas, 15th Waikato Guineas, 15th Avondale Guineas
- We'regoingtogetcha – 8th New Zealand 2000 Guineas, 8th Levin Classic, 3rd Waikato Guineas
- Fast Dragon – 3rd Trevor Eagle Memorial, 4th Championship Stakes, 3rd Karaka Mile, 6th Avondale Guineas
- Chipandchase – 8th Championship Stakes, 10th Karaka Mile
- Maygrove – 9th Championship Stakes
- Blizzard – 2nd Championship Stakes, 6th Waikato Guineas, 7th Avondale Guineas
- Thorn Pass – 7th Levin Classic, 10th Avondale Guineas
- Lucky Feather – 3rd Wellington Guineas, 3rd Wellington Stakes, 10th Levin Classic, 4th Avondale Guineas
- The Fire Inside – 7th Eulogy Stakes, 3rd Sir Tristram Fillies' Classic
- Colonel Carrera – 13th Great Northern Guineas, 5th Championship Stakes, 2nd Waikato Guineas, 11th Avondale Guineas
- Spellbinder – 2nd Sarten Memorial, 3rd New Zealand 1000 Guineas, 1st Karaka Mile, 2nd Sir Tristram Fillies' Classic
- Habitual Offender – 6th Great Northern Guineas
- King Savinsky – 6th Trevor Eagle Memorial, 10th Waikato Guineas
- Stand Your Ground – No stakes races
- Mr Frankey – No stakes races

=== Subsequent Group 1 wins ===
Subsequent wins at Group 1 level by runners in the 2014 New Zealand Derby.

- Rising Romance – Australian Oaks
- Puccini – Thorndon Mile

== See also ==
- Recent winners of major NZ 3 year old races
- Desert Gold Stakes
- Hawke's Bay Guineas
- Karaka Million
- Levin Classic
- New Zealand 1000 Guineas
- New Zealand 2000 Guineas
- New Zealand Oaks
