= 2025 New Zealand Derby =

Group I horse race

The 2025 New Zealand Derby was a Group I horse race which was run at Ellerslie Racecourse in Auckland, New Zealand, on 8 March 2025. It was the 150th running of the New Zealand Derby, and it was won by Willydoit.

The 2025 New Zealand Derby was part of the inaugural Champions Day, which also featured the Group One Sistema Stakes, Group One New Zealand Thoroughbred Breeders Stakes, Group One New Zealand Stakes, Group Two Auckland Cup and the $3.5 million NZB Kiwi.

== Details ==
Willydoit is trained by Shaun and Emma Clotworthy. Emma Clotworthy shares ownership along with Bryan Black, plus hundreds of micro-share owners in a syndicate put together by the international MyRacehorse group. Shaun Clotworthy's father Kim, himself a successful trainer, was part-owner of the 1977 New Zealand Derby winner Uncle Remus.

Willydoit was the first Group One winner for Shaun and Emma Clotworthy, and the first Group One victory on New Zealand soil for Michael Dee. A successful apprentice jockey in his homeland, Dee relocated to Australia in 2015 and has ridden numerous Group One winners in Melbourne.

Willydoit was bred by Gerry Harvey and is a son of Westbury Stud stallion Tarzino, who himself won the Victoria Derby at Flemington Racecourse in 2015.

Westbury Stud offered Willydoit at the 2023 New Zealand Bloodstock National Yearling Sale at Karaka, where trainers Shaun and Emma Clotworthy bought him for $75,000.

Unraced as a two-year-old, Willydoit made his debut in the spring of his three-year-old season with a strong-finishing third over 1150 metres at Te Aroha.

All of his subsequent New Zealand starts came at Ellerslie Racecourse, where he rose to New Zealand Derby favouritism with three impressive victories in a row on December 12, January 1 and February 1.

That burgeoning reputation was dented with an unplaced finish in the Avondale Guineas, which is traditionally regarded as a key lead-up to the New Zealand Derby two weeks later. Willydoit was a huge margin from the lead in a slowly run race, making little impression in the straight and finishing 10th behind the Australian raider Thedoctoroflove. The race time was 2:16.67, seven seconds slower than subsequent Derby winner Orchestral the previous year.

However, the Clotworthys were unfazed and pressed on towards their long-time goal, and Willydoit went down to the New Zealand Derby starting gate as a $3.70 equal favourite.

Ridden for the first time by Dee, Willydoit was awkwardly drawn in gate 14 among a 16-horse field and was caught wide around the first turn. Dee elected to press forward, sliding up into third down the back straight. The two horses in front of him began to tire coming down the side of the track, and Willydoit marched forward to take command.

Willydoit kicked away in the straight and put himself well out of reach, winning by two and a quarter lengths from Thedoctoroflove and Golden Century.

== Race details ==
- Sponsor: Trackside
- Prize money: NZ$1,250,000
- Track: Soft
- Number of runners: 16
- Winner's time: 2:30.08

== Full result ==
	Margin	Horse	Jockey	Trainer(s)	Odds
1		Willydoit	Michael Dee	Shaun & Emma Clotworthy	$3.70
2	2 1/4	Thedoctoroflove	Daniel Moor	Trent Busuttin & Natalie Young	$7.30
3	Long head	Golden Century	Ryan Elliot	Tony Pike	$36.70
4	2 1/2	Mustang Morgan	Craig Grylls	Andrew Forsman	$54.50
5	Nose	Kiwi Skyhawk	Matt Cartwright	Stephen Marsh	$40.40
6	Head	Don Pedro	Sam Spratt	Peter Jeffcoat	$51.40
7	Neck	Tuxedo	Joe Doyle	Shaune Ritchie & Colm Murray	$3.70
8	4	Hakkinen	Blake Shinn	Mark Walker & Sam Bergerson	$9.10
9	1 3/4	Ayteem	Kelly Myers	Janelle Millar	$98.60
10	Nose	Interplanetary	Ace Lawson-Carroll	Shaun & Emma Clotworthy	$107.50
11	Neck	Oceana Dream	George Rooke	Roger James & Robert Wellwood	$5.60
12	1	Ridefromtheashes	Vinnie Colgan	Ben & Ryan Foote	$81.10
13	3/4	Bourbon Proof	Michael McNab	Stephen Marsh	$11.20
14	1	Casemiro	Masa Hashizume	Jenna Mahoney	$106.80
15	12	Amazing Fluke	Kevin Stott	Tony Pike	$45.00
16	9 3/4	Grey Area	Warren Kennedy	Roger James & Robert Wellwood	$58.80

== Winner's details ==
Further details of the winner, Willydoit:

- Foaled: 18 September 2021
- Sire: Tarzino; Dam: Willamette (by More Than Ready)
- Owner: B G Black, Mrs E L Clotworthy & MyRacehorse Pty Ltd
- Trainer: Shaun & Emma Clotworthy
- Breeder: Gerry Harvey
- Starts: 6
- Wins: 4
- Seconds: 0
- Thirds: 1
- Earnings: NZ$847,415

=== The road to the Derby ===
Early-season appearances prior to running in the Derby.

- Willydoit – three consecutive wins at Ellerslie, 10th Avondale Guineas
- Thedoctorolove – 1st Avondale Guineas
- Golden Century – 2nd Gingernuts Salver, 4th Waikato Guineas, 8th Avondale Guineas
- Mustang Morgan – 1st Gingernuts Salver, 9th Avondale Guineas
- Kiwi Skyhawk – 3rd War Decree Stakes, 4th New Zealand 2000 Guineas, 5th Karaka Millions 3YO, 7th Avondale Guineas
- Tuxedo – 1st Wellington Stakes, 2nd Karaka Millions 3YO, 1st Waikato Guineas
- Hakkinen – 4th Gingernuts Salver, 4th Avondale Guineas
- Interplanetary – 5th Gingernuts Salver, 13th Avondale Guineas
- Oceana Dream – 3rd Avondale Guineas
- Ridefromtheashes – 5th Levin Classic, 6th Avondale Guineas
- Bourbon Proof – 2nd Armacup 3YO Stakes, 4th Karaka Millions 3YO, 2nd Waikato Guineas, 2nd Avondale Guineas
- Casemiro – 3rd Gingernuts Salver, 7th Waikato Guineas
- Amazing Fluke – 3rd Waikato Guineas, 5th Avondale Guineas

=== Subsequent Group 1 wins ===
Subsequent wins at Group 1 level by runners in the 2025 New Zealand Derby.

== See also ==
- Recent winners of major NZ 3 year old races
