= 2019 New Zealand Derby =

The 2019 New Zealand Derby was a horse race which took place at Ellerslie Racecourse on Saturday 2 March 2019. It was the 144th running of the New Zealand Derby, and it was won by Crown Prosecutor. With a dividend of $105.40 for a $1 win bet, it was considered the biggest upset in Derby history.

Crown Prosecutor was bred by Hesket Bloodstock in Victoria, Australia and was bought for A$50,000 at the Inglis Melbourne Premier Yearling Sale. He is owned by Huntingdale Lodge 2012 Ltd (managed by Harvey Green) and JML Bloodstock Ltd (Lib Petagna) and is trained by Stephen Marsh in Cambridge.

Although he had won the Wellington Stakes at Group Three level in November, Crown Prosecutor had two subsequent non-winning races, and had the highest odds in the 18-horse Derby field.

It was a first New Zealand Derby victory for Marsh and Crown Prosecutor's jockey Craig Grylls. Marsh had two runners in the race, with ninth-placed Vernanme considered the better chance as third favourite.

In A Twinkling came in second. In A Twinkling's trainer Jamie Richards and owners Te Akau Racing had previously won the race in 2017 with Gingernuts, but came second in 2018 with their horse Mongolianconqueror being beaten by a nose by Vin De Dance.

== Race details ==
- Sponsor: Vodafone New Zealand
- Prize money: NZ$1,000,000
- Track: Good
- Number of runners: 18
- Winner's time: 2:28.17

== Full result ==
	Margin	Horse	Jockey	Trainer(s)	Odds
1		Crown Prosecutor	Craig Grylls	Stephen Marsh	$105.40
2	Head	In A Twinkling	Glen Boss	Jamie Richards	$6.80
3	1½	Platinum Invador	Chris Johnson	Lisa Latta	$13.10
4	Neck	Arrogant	Cameron Lammas	Michael Moroney & Pam Gerard	$27.50
5	Short neck	Surely Sacred	Vinnie Colgan	Tony Pike	$2.70
6	¾	Bobby Dee	Jonathan Riddell	Murray Baker & Andrew Forsman	$49.80
7	Neck	Tolemac	Jake Bayliss	Paul Jenkins	$102.90
8	¾	Prise De Fer	Opie Bosson	Jamie Richards	$17.30
9	¾	Vernanme	Jason Waddell	Stephen Marsh	$9.80
10	Nose	Cutadeel	Matt Cameron	Murray Baker & Andrew Forsman	$19.70
11	Neck	The Chosen One	Sam Spratt	Murray Baker & Andrew Forsman	$34.60
12	½	Swords Drawn	Samantha Collett	Shaune Ritchie	$46.80
13	1½	Sir Nate	Rosie Myers	Lisa Latta	$40.40
14	½	Botti	Trudy Thornton	Chris Waller	$44.50
15	Neck	SpongeBob	Troy Harris	Graham Richardson & Gavin Parker	$17.50
16	1	More Wonder	Ryan Elliot	Team Rogerson	$20.40
17	1	Nobu	Pat Cosgrave	Chris Waller	$12.40
18	9	Lincoln Falls	Johnathan Parkes	Lisa Latta	$41.10

== Winner's details ==
Further details of the winner, Crown Prosecutor:

- Foaled: 19 September 2015
- Sire: Medaglia d'Oro;
- Dam: Riptide (Exceed And Excel)
- Owner: Huntingdale Lodge 2012 Ltd (Mgr: Harvey Green) & JML Bloodstock Ltd (Mgr: L Petagna)
- Trainer: Stephen Marsh
- Breeder: Hesket Bloodstock
- Starts: 7
- Wins: 2
- Seconds: 0
- Thirds: 2
- Earnings: $644,625

=== The road to the Derby ===
Early-season appearances in 2018-19 prior to running in the Derby.

- Crown Prosecutor – 3rd Wellington Stakes, 8th Levin Classic, 9th Waikato Guineas
- In A Twinkling – 4th New Zealand 2000 Guineas, 7th Uncle Remus Stakes, 13th Karaka Million 3YO Classic, 2nd Avondale Guineas
- Platinum Invador – 9th Avondale Guineas
- Arrogant – 9th Sarten Memorial, 7th Auckland Guineas, 6th Levin Classic, 2nd Waikato Guineas
- Surely Sacred – 2nd Bonecrusher Stakes, 1st Auckland Guineas, 5th Karaka Million 3YO Classic, 1st Avondale Guineas
- Bobby Dee – 10th Trevor Eagle Memorial, 6th Auckland Salver, 4th Avondale Guineas
- Tolemac – 4th Geelong Classic, 14th Victoria Derby, 8th Auckland Guineas, 14th Avondale Guineas
- Prise De Fer – 6th Karaka Million 3YO Classic, 5th Avondale Guineas
- Vernanme – 5th Uncle Remus Stakes, 2nd Levin Classic, 3rd Avondale Guineas
- Cutadeel – 1st Auckland Salver, 13th Avondale Guineas
- The Chosen One – 1st Zacinto Stakes, 11th New Zealand 2000 Guineas, 4th Waikato Guineas, 7th Avondale Guineas
- Swords Drawn – 2nd Wellington Stakes, 3rd Auckland Salver, 14th Karaka Million 3YO Classic, 11th Avondale Guineas
- Sir Nate – 7th Hawke's Bay Guineas, 3rd New Zealand 2000 Guineas, 10th Karaka Million 3YO Classic, 6th Avondale Guineas
- Botti – 4th Wanganui Guineas, 11th Moonee Valley Vase, 12th Avondale Guineas
- SpongeBob – 1st Waikato Guineas
- More Wonder – 5th New Zealand 2000 Guineas, 4th Auckland Guineas, 4th Levin Classic, 5th Thorndon Mile, 4th Haunui Farm WFA Classic
- Lincoln Falls – 4th Uncle Remus Stakes, 5th Levin Classic, 5th Waikato Guineas

=== Subsequent performances ===
Crown Prosecutor was only 9th in the Rosehill Guineas and its best subsequent performance was 3rd behind Melody Belle in the Group 1 2019 Livamol Classic (2040m)

Runner up in the New Zealand Derby, In A Twinkling who followed up with 5th in both the Tulloch Stakes and Australian Derby behind Angel of Truth won the Group 3 Counties Cup (2100m) in 2019 and 2020 and was 3rd in the 2020 Zabeel Classic.

3rd placed Platinum Invader was behind In A Twinking in the same Australian starts but was later to achieve:

- 1st in the Group 3 2020 City of Auckland Cup (2400m).
- 2nd in the 2019 Manawatu Cup, Group 2 2020 Avondale Cup (2400m) and 2021 City of Auckland Cup.
- 3rd in the 2019 Wanganui Cup, Group 1 2020 Auckland Cup and Group 2 2020 Herbert Power Stakes (2400m).

4th placed Arrogant was 2nd in the Rosehill Guineas behind The Autumn Sun but could only manage 9th in the Australian Derby.

5th placed Surely Sacred placed 4th in the Rosehill Guineas and 3rd in the Australian Derby.

8th placed Prise De Fer did not go to Australia but after a spell had 5 consecutive wins including the Group 2 2020 Rich Hill Mile (1600m) and Group 3 2020 Taranaki Cup (1800m) before a 2nd in the Otaki-Maori Weight for Age. It continued to be competitive in Group company.

Although only 11th in the New Zealand Derby, The Chosen One went on to compete with distinction at the very highest level including:

- 1st in the Group 1 2022 Thorndon Mile, Group 2 2019 Herbert Power Stakes, Group 3 2019 Frank Packer Plate at Randwick, and Group 3 Manawatu Classic at Awapuni.
- 2nd in the 2021 Herbie Dyke Stakes and 2020 Sydney Cup.
- 3rd in the 2020 Caulfield Cup and 2020 Otaki-Maori Weight for Age.
- 4th in the 2020 Melbourne Cup and 2019 Australian Derby.

== See also ==
- Recent winners of major NZ 3 year old races
- Desert Gold Stakes
- Hawke's Bay Guineas
- Karaka Million
- Levin Classic
- New Zealand 1000 Guineas
- New Zealand 2000 Guineas
- New Zealand Oaks
