= 2020 New Zealand Derby =

The 2020 New Zealand Derby was a Group I horse race which took place at Ellerslie Racecourse on Saturday 29 February 2020. It was the 145th running of the New Zealand Derby, and it was won by Sherwood Forest.

Sherwood Forest was bred by the Goodson & Perron Family Trust and was sold for A$100,000 at the Magic Millions Gold Coast Yearling Sale. He is owned by the Goodson & Perron Family Trust, Calder Bloodstock Ltd and Deborah Martin. Sherwood Forest is trained by Tony Pike in Cambridge, New Zealand.

Sherwood Forest had made an impact in the spring, winning two races including the War Decree Stakes at Group Three level in October, and he also finished third in the New Zealand 2000 Guineas in November. But trainer Tony Pike believed he would come into his own over longer distances later in the season.

The 2020 Derby had been billed as a two-horse battle of the sexes. The filly Two Illicit had scored a seven-length win in the Waikato Guineas, while the well-bred gelding Dragon Leap easily won the Avondale Guineas. They disputed favouritism throughout the two weeks leading into the Derby, and no other runner was in single-figure odds.

Coming around the home turn, that two-horse showdown appeared to be happening as Dragon Leap and Two Illicit surged to the lead together. But Sherwood Forest stayed with them and began to poke through in between them. Ridden by Melbourne-based jockey Michael Walker, his stamina shone through as he pulled clear in the last 200 metres to win by a length and a quarter. Two Illicit held on for second, with the fast-finishing Scorpz snatching third from a tiring Dragon Leap.

The time for the Derby was 2:26.77, which was the fastest since 1998 and the third-fastest since 1972.

It was a third Derby victory for Walker, who had previously won on Military Move in 2010 and on Puccini in 2014.

It was Pike's second Derby, having won the race in 2016 with Rangipo.

== Race details ==
- Sponsor: Vodafone New Zealand
- Prize money: NZ$1,000,000
- Track: Good
- Number of runners: 16
- Winner's time: 2:26.77

== Full result ==
	Margin	Horse	Jockey	Trainer(s)	Odds
1		Sherwood Forest	Michael Walker	Tony Pike	$13.50
2	1¼	Two Illicit	Vinnie Colgan	Roger James & Robert Wellwood	$2.00
3	2	Scorpz	Danielle Johnson	Stephen Marsh	$13.10
4	Long head	Dragon Leap	Jason Waddell	Lance O'Sullivan & Andrew Scott	$3.10
5	½	Monlula	Michael Coleman	Roger James & Robert Wellwood	$91.80
6	Head	Reggiewood	Ryan Elliot	Roger James & Robert Wellwood	$14.60
7	3½	Den Bosch	Craig Grylls	Peter Didham	$114.50
8	1	Platinum Road	Jonathan Riddell	Lisa Latta	$87.70
9	1¼	Lochwinnoch	Sam Spratt	Michael Wallace	$155.30
10	¾	Platinum Spirit	Rosie Myers	Lisa Latta	$61.50
11	Nose	Shakespeare	Sam Collett	Johno Benner & Hollie Wynyard	$72.10
12	3½	Dalmatia	Sam Weatherley	Johno Benner & Hollie Wynyard	$119.50
13	2½	Tibetan	Leith Innes	Andrew Campbell	$23.80
14	3	Vladivostok	Shaun McKay	Andrew Campbell	$29.90
15	4	Red Rufus	Robert Hannam	Peter Didham	$102.20
16	7	Peloton	Matt Cameron	Andrew Campbell	$107.70

== Winner's details ==
Further details of the winner, Sherwood Forest:

- Foaled: 1 September 2016
- Sire: Fastnet Rock; Dam: Chasing Mammon (Giant's Causeway)
- Owner: Goodson & Perron Family Trust, Calder Bloodstock Ltd & Deborah Martin
- Trainer: Tony Pike
- Breeder: Goodson & Perron Family Trust
- Starts: 11
- Wins: 4
- Seconds: 0
- Thirds: 2
- Earnings: $737,875

=== The road to the Derby ===
Early-season appearances prior to running in the 2020 Derby.

- Sherwood Forest – 5th Hawke's Bay Guineas, 1st War Decree Stakes, 3rd New Zealand 2000 Guineas, 4th Auckland Guineas, 3rd Avondale Guineas
- Two Illicit – 1st Trevor Eagle Memorial, 2nd Eight Carat Classic, 1st Royal Stakes, 1st Waikato Guineas
- Scorpz – 1st Wellington Stakes, 1st 3YO Salver, 2nd Avondale Guineas
- Dragon Leap – 2nd Trevor Eagle Memorial, 1st Auckland Guineas, 1st Avondale Guineas
- Den Bosch – 7th Avondale Guineas
- Platinum Road – 4th Waikato Guineas
- Lochwinnoch – 4th 3YO Salver, 11th Avondale Guineas
- Dalmatia – 9th Avondale Guineas
- Tibetan – 3rd Wellington Stakes, 2nd 3YO Salver, 5th Karaka Million 3YO Classic, 4th Avondale Guineas
- Peloton – 5th Wellington Stakes, 7th 3YO Salver, 5th Waikato Guineas

=== Subsequent Group 1 wins ===
Subsequent wins at Group 1 level by runners in the 2020 New Zealand Derby.

- Two Illicit – winner of the 2021 Captain Cook Stakes

== See also ==
- Recent winners of major NZ 3 year old races
- Desert Gold Stakes
- Hawke's Bay Guineas
- Karaka Million
- Levin Classic
- New Zealand 1000 Guineas
- New Zealand 2000 Guineas
- New Zealand Oaks
