= 2013 New Zealand Derby =

The 2013 New Zealand Derby was a horse race which took place at Ellerslie Racecourse on Saturday 2 March 2013. It was the 138th running of the New Zealand Derby, and it was won by Habibi. With Silent Achiever having won the race 12 months earlier, it was the first time in the history of the race that fillies have won the Derby two years in a row. The runner-up, Fix, is also a filly, and it was just the second time fillies have finished first and second in the race in more than half a century.

The race is also notable for being the fifth Derby win for jockey Vinnie Colgan - an all-time record for the race.

Habibi's Derby win came in just her seventh career start, and as part of her first racing campaign. She made her debut on her home track, Ruakaka, on October 17, winning over 1200m. A series of increasingly impressive wins followed, including a Group 2 double against males at Ellerslie Racecourse over the Christmas/New Year period. It was then that connections opted to target the Derby.

Although she had tasted defeat for the first time at her previous start, when a fast-finishing third in the Avondale Guineas, Habibi was the hot favourite in the Derby. She began well, but settled in about midfield as a strong pace was set by front-runner Castlzeberg. Habibi made her run early in the home straight, and she and Fix passed Castlzeberg together and drew away to fight out the finish. Though Fix resisted strongly all the way to the line, Habibi was able to edge away to win by half a length.

== Race details ==
- Sponsor: TV3
- Prize money: NZ$750,000
- Track: Good
- Number of runners: 18
- Winner's time: 2:27.58

== Full result ==
	Margin	Horse	Jockey	Trainer(s)	Odds
1		Habibi	Vinnie Colgan	Donna & Dean Logan	$3.00
2	½	Fix	Mark Du Plessis	Ken & Bev Kelso	$9.60
3	1½	Castlzeberg	Opie Bosson	Jenny & Bob Vance	$3.80
4	2¼	Saint Kitt	Rogan Norvall	Kelly Burne	$124.50
5	1¼	Choice Bro	Jonathan Riddell	John Sargent	$15.90
6	Head	King Kamada	Noel Harris	Lisa Latta	$27.40
7	1½	Alert	Matthew Cameron	Jason Bridgman	$13.50
8	4	Zinko	Alysha Collett	Moira Murdoch & Dominic Olson	$48.70
9	¾	The Grinner	Mark Hills	Stephen McKee	$60.00
10	Nose	Soriano	Lisa Allpress	Graeme & Debbie Rogerson	$16.30
11	¾	Addictive Habit	Andrew Calder	Lee Somervell	$76.50
12	¾	Weissmuller	Michael Walker	John Kiernan	$17.40
13	1½	Kidwelly	Michael Coleman	Michael Moroney & Chad Ormsby	$39.90
14	2	Deane Martin	Sam Spratt	Bruce Wallace	$22.50
15	Head	Corporal Lincoln	Kelly Myers	Lisa Latta	$74.20
16	3	Solar Eclipse	Rory Hutchings	Graeme & Debbie Rogerson	$117.30
17	3½	Dubai Shuffle	Jamie Mott	Gareth McRae & Andrew Clarken	$35.30
18	6	Celtic Chief	Jason Jago	Shaune Ritchie	$41.40

== Winner's details ==
Further details of the winner, Habibi:

- Foaled: 4 September 2009 in New Zealand
- Sire: Ekraar; Dam: Danny Holiday (Danasinga)
- Owner: G P, H J & P J Crofskey & P A McIntyre
- Trainer: Donna & Dean Logan
- Breeder: H J & P J Crofskey
- Starts: 7
- Wins: 6
- Seconds: 0
- Thirds: 1
- Earnings: $602,575

=== The road to the Derby ===
Early-season appearances in 2012-13 prior to running in the Derby.

- Habibi – 1st Great Northern Guineas, 1st Championship Stakes, 3rd Avondale Guineas
- Fix – 3rd New Zealand 1000 Guineas, 1st Eight Carat Classic, 1st Royal Stakes, 1st Sir Tristram Fillies' Classic
- Castlzeberg – 1st Waikato Guineas, 2nd Avondale Guineas
- Saint Kitt - No stakes races
- Choice Bro – 1st Karaka Mile, 4th Avondale Guineas
- King Kamada – 3rd Championship Stakes Prelude
- Alert - No stakes races
- Zinko – 3rd Bonecrusher Stakes, 2nd Wellington Guineas, 8th Levin Classic, 2nd Waikato Guineas, 5th Avondale Guineas
- The Grinner – No stakes races
- Soriano – 4th Wellington Guineas, 6th New Zealand 1000 Guineas, 3rd Levin Classic, 1st Eulogy Stakes, 2nd Eight Carat Classic, 3rd Royal Stakes, 2nd Desert Gold Stakes, 2nd Sir Tristram Fillies' Classic
- Addictive Habit – 7th Hawke's Bay Guineas, 7th Levin Classic, 2nd Great Northern Guineas, 2nd Championship Stakes, 6th Waikato Guineas, 9th Championship Stakes
- Weissmuller – 1st Wellington Stakes, 9th Waikato Guineas, 7th Avondale Guineas
- Kidwelly – 5th Great Northern Guineas, 2nd Royal Stakes, 5th Karaka Mile, 4th Sir Tristram Fillies' Classic
- Deane Martin - 1st Championship Stakes Prelude, 6th Championship Stakes
- Corporal Lincoln - 9th Karaka Mile
- Solar Eclipse - 6th Championship Stakes Prelude, 3rd Championship Stakes, 8th Avondale Guineas
- Dubai Shuffle - 7th Karaka Mile
- Celtic Chief - 5th Waikato Guineas, 6th Avondale Guineas

=== Subsequent Group 1 wins ===
Subsequent wins at Group 1 level by runners in the 2013 New Zealand Derby.

- Soriano - Zabeel Classic, Herbie Dyke Stakes
- Addictive Habit - Livamol Classic
- Habibi - 2nd Northern Dancer Turf Stakes

== See also ==
- Recent winners of major NZ 3 year old races
- Desert Gold Stakes
- Hawke's Bay Guineas
- Karaka Million
- Levin Classic
- New Zealand 1000 Guineas
- New Zealand 2000 Guineas
- New Zealand Oaks
