= 2018 New Zealand Derby =

The 2018 New Zealand Derby was a horse race which took place at Ellerslie Racecourse on Saturday 3 March 2018. It was the 143rd running of the New Zealand Derby, and it was won by Vin De Dance.

Vin De Dance was offered at the New Zealand Bloodstock Ready to Run Sale as a two-year-old, but was passed in. A sale was later negotiated for $70,000, with breeder Luigi Muollo retaining a share alongside new owners OTI Racing and the Kilted Taniwha Syndicate.

The son of Roc de Cambes was sent to the Cambridge stable of Hall of Famer Murray Baker and his training partner Andrew Forsman. The team has won multiple New Zealand training premierships, and guided Mongolian Khan to victory in the 2015 New Zealand Derby.

Vin De Dance made a winning debut at Pukekohe in early September, then was placed in two subsequent appearances at Te Rapa. He was sent to Melbourne, where he finished third at Flemington and fifth in the Moonee Valley Vase.

Withdrawn from the Victoria Derby and given several months off to strengthen and develop, Vin De Dance returned with fourth and sixth placings over 1400 and 1600 metres in late January and early February. He moved into Derby contention with a fighting third in the Avondale Guineas.

The fifth favourite for the Derby at $9.90, Vin De Dance was handy throughout the 2400-metre race and loomed as a major threat around the home turn. He hit the lead inside the last 200 metres, but was joined by Mongolianconqueror in a desperate two-horse battle to the finish that Vin De Dance won by a nose.

OTI Racing's Terry Henderson described the New Zealand Derby win as the fulfilment of a long-held dream.

It was the first Derby win for jockey Jason Waddell.

Mongolianconqueror's trainers Stephen Autridge and Jamie Richards came up a mere nose short of winning the Derby two years in a row, having won the 2017 running with Gingernuts.

== Race details ==
- Sponsor: Vodafone New Zealand
- Prize money: NZ$1,000,000
- Track: Good
- Number of runners: 18
- Winner's time: 2:28.44

== Full result ==
	Margin	Horse	Jockey	Trainer(s)	Odds
1		Vin De Dance	Jason Waddell	Murray Baker & Andrew Forsman	$9.90
2	Nose	Mongolianconqueror	Michael McNab	Stephen Autridge & Jamie Richards (horse trainer)	$16.00
3	1½	Danzdanzdance	Matt Cameron	Donna Logan & Chris Gibbs	$3.50
4	Nose	The Mayor	Rory Hutchings	Lance O'Sullivan & Andrew Scott	$23.50
5	Short neck	Endowment	Alysha Collett	Donna Logan & Chris Gibbs	$52.70
6	1½	Mission Hill	Danielle Johnson	Murray Baker & Andrew Forsman	$6.40
7	½	Civil Disobedience	Ben Allen	Darren Weir	$5.30
8	½	On The Rocks	Jake Bayliss	Michael Moroney & Pam Gerard	$6.40
9	½	Time Lord	Samantha Collett	Richard Collett	$29.20
10	Long neck	Irish Flame	Jonathan Riddell	John Wheeler	$107.80
11	1½	Joe's Legacy	Leith Innes	Jason Price	$41.40
12	½	Humble Pie	Rosie Myers	Adrian & Harry Bull	$63.40
13	1	Bel Ragazzo	Shaun McKay	Shane Crawford	$76.50
14	1½	Jimmy Rocket	Michael Coleman	Roger James	$81.40
15	3½	Secret Ambition	Johnathan Parkes	Bruce Wallace & Allan Peard	$128.50
16	Nose	Maktoum	Mark Du Plessis	Stephen McKee	$98.10
17	½	Tavlin	Sam Spratt	Donna Logan & Chris Gibbs	$81.60
18	½	He's A Freak	Masa Tanaka	Lisa Latta	$27.50

== Winner's details ==
Further details of the winner, Vin De Dance:

- Foaled: 13 September 2014
- Sire: Roc de Cambes; Dam: Explosive Dancer (San Luis)
- Owner: OTI Racing (Mgr: T Henderson), L Muollo & Kilted Taniwha Syndicate
- Trainer: Murray Baker & Andrew Forsman
- Breeder: Explosive Breeding Ltd (L Muollo)
- Starts: 9
- Wins: 2
- Seconds: 2
- Thirds: 2
- Earnings: $639,969

=== The road to the Derby ===
Early-season appearances in 2017-18 prior to running in the Derby.

- Vin De Dance – 5th Moonee Valley Vase, 3rd Avondale Guineas
- Mongolianconqueror – 2nd Waikato Guineas, 7th Avondale Guineas
- Danzdanzdance – 6th Karaka Million 3YO Classic, 2nd Avondale Guineas
- The Mayor – 6th Avondale Guineas
- Endowment – 2nd Auckland Guineas, 8th Avondale Guineas
- Mission Hill – 5th Avondale Guineas
- Civil Disobedience – 1st Tasmanian Derby
- On The Rocks – 1st Trevor Eagle Memorial, 3rd Auckland Guineas, 8th Karaka Million 3YO Classic, 1st Avondale Guineas
- Time Lord – 3rd Waikato Guineas
- Irish Flame – 3rd El Roca Trophy, 7th Hawke's Bay Guineas, 8th Sarten Memorial, 7th New Zealand 2000 Guineas, 13th Avondale Guineas
- Jimmy Rocket – 12th Waikato Guineas
- Secret Ambition – 10th Trevor Eagle Memorial, 3rd Auckland Salver, 17th Karaka Million 3YO Classic, 14th Avondale Guineas
- Maktoum – 7th Levin Classic, 5th Waikato Guineas
- Tavlin – 11th Waikato Guineas

=== Subsequent Group 1 wins ===
Subsequent wins at Group 1 level by runners in the 2018 New Zealand Derby.

- Danzdanzdance - 2018 Captain Cook Stakes, 2018 Zabeel Classic.
- On The Rocks - 2019 Herbie Dyke Stakes.

== See also ==
- Recent winners of major NZ 3 year old races
- Desert Gold Stakes
- Hawke's Bay Guineas
- Karaka Million
- Levin Classic
- New Zealand 1000 Guineas
- New Zealand 2000 Guineas
- New Zealand Oaks
