= I'm Henry =

New Zealand racehorse

- Sire: Entrepreneur (GB)
- Grandsire: Ribot
- Dam: Ina Bahroo
- Damsire: Bahroona (USA)
- Sex: Gelding
- Foaled: 1980
- Country: New Zealand
- Colour: Bay
- Breeder: L N Fisher & J F Twomey
- Owner: Mr & Mrs A J Bates
- Trainer: Colin Jillings
- Record: 21:8-3-2
- Earnings: $230,975

Major wins
- New Zealand Derby (1984); Great Northern Guineas (1983)
- Last updated on 6 August 2010

I'm Henry is a non-stud book racehorse who won the New Zealand Derby in 1984. The win was a record fourth winner of the race for trainer Colin Jillings who later added his fifth with The Phantom Chance in 1993.

He was by Entrepreneur (GB), his dam, Ina Bahroo was by Bahroona (USA). I'm Henry was a half-brother to the Listed Race winner, In Pursuit by Diplomatic Star (USA).

== Racing record ==
I'm Henry proved himself to be as good as any horse of his generation both at two and three. He was placed at Group One (G1) level at two and proved himself early in his three-year-old season with victory in the Group 2 Great Northern Guineas and Avondale Guineas. In 1983 he also won the G2 ARC Eclipse Stakes, ARC Winstone Guineas and G3, Waikato Guineas.

When the time came for the biggest test of the season, I'm Henry rose to the challenge and won the New Zealand Derby in a three-way photo finish with Jurango and Zepherin.

In 1984 he won the listed, A R C Guineas Trial over 1,400 metres.

== See also ==
- Thoroughbred racing in New Zealand
