= Redoute =

Redoute or Redouté may refer to:

== People ==
- Pierre-Joseph Redouté, 19th-century Belgian botanical illustrator

== Places ==
- Redoute, Bad Godesberg, a hall opened in 1792 for balls of the court of Archduke Maximilian Francis of Austria
- Côte de La Redoute, a climb in Wallonia, Belgium, often included in the Liège–Bastogne–Liège cycle route.

== Sports ==
- La Redoute (cycling team), a former French professional cycling team
- Redoute's Dancer, an Australian Thoroughbred racehorse
- Redoute's Choice, an Australian Thoroughbred racehorse and champion sire

== Other ==
- La Redoute, a French retailer
- masquerade ball
