= Jolly Jake =

New Zealand-bred Thoroughbred racehorse

- Sire: Three Legs
- Grandsire: Petingo
- Dam: Honeypot
- Damsire: Sucaryl
- Sex: Colt
- Foaled: 1981
- Country: New Zealand
- Colour: Brown
- Breeder: John Scoular
- Owner: Ivan Allan
- Trainer: Alan Jones
- Record: 16:5-3-2 (in New Zealand); 12:4-2-0 (in USA)
- Earnings: $165,335 (in New Zealand); $20,300 (in USA)

Major wins
- New Zealand Derby (1984)
- Last updated on February 26, 2008

Jolly Jake was a Thoroughbred racehorse who won the New Zealand Derby in 1984.

He was bred by John and Lucy Scouler in the Hawkes Bay and sold to Singapore-based Ivan Allan

== Racing career ==
It took five attempts for the colt to clear maiden company, which he did at Pukekohe four months before his Derby triumph, but he steadily improved, performing consistently throughout. He only finished further back than fifth twice, once in the Waikato Guineas and once over an unsuitable 1200 metres at Te Aroha

During his New Zealand career he was ridden by Linda Ballantyne and Chris McNab.

With Ballantyne aboard he was placed second behind Koda Lad in the 1984 Auckland Thoroughbred Breeders Stakes (1600m, Group 3) at Counties. In mid-December 1984 he was successful in the Avondale Guineas (2000m, Group 2) beating Twelve Gauge and Globetrotter. Then on Boxing Day, again with McNab aboard, he won the New Zealand Derby (2400m Group 1) beating Dusky Legend and Avana. His winning time of 2:27.39 was a race record that stood until broken by The Phantom Chance eight years later. This race, easily his greatest career performance, was his final start in New Zealand.

According to the 1984/85 Australasian Racing Year, the colt was sold for $1 million to race in America. Unplaced in five starts at Santa Anita, Hollywood Park and Bay Meadows in late-1985 and early-1986, the colt finished his career on the Southern steeplechasing circuit, where he won four races in seven starts from 1986 to 1988.

== Stud career ==
Jolly Jake went on to sire a number of winners in Ireland including many jumpers. Notable winners were:

- Foxchapel King, 12 wins
- Xaipete, 17 wins
- Aimees Mark, 9 wins

== See also ==
- Thoroughbred racing in New Zealand
