= 2012 New Zealand Derby =

The 2012 New Zealand Derby was a horse race which took place at Ellerslie Racecourse on Saturday 3 March 2012. It was the 137th running of the New Zealand Derby, and it was won by Silent Achiever. Silent Achiever was the first filly to win the race in 19 years, and just the fourth since 1966. Silent Achiever gave trainer Roger James his fifth victory in the race.

Silent Achiever was still a maiden at the time early nominations for the Derby were taken. She was not nominated for the race, and was not regarded as a Derby contender. However, victories against males over the 2011/12 summer gained her a winning record - the Group 2 Championship Stakes on January 1, the Group 3 Waikato Guineas on January 28 and the Group 2 Avondale Guineas on February 18 . In these races Silent Achiever beat Derby contenders and entered as the favourite for the race.

Silent Achiever was a little slow to begin in the Derby, and she was a long way off the pace for much of the race. But jockey James McDonald made a bold, sustained move around the outside of the field around the far turn, and Silent Achiever hit the lead soon after the field turned for home. She held her advantage strongly to the line, drawing away to beat 2000 Guineas winner Rock 'n' Pop by two and a half lengths.

== Race details ==
- Sponsor: Telecom
- Prize money: NZ$750,000
- Track: Slow
- Number of runners: 16
- Winner's time: 2:33.55

== Full result ==
Placing	Margin	Horse	Jockey	Trainer(s)	Odds
1		Silent Achiever	James McDonald	Roger James	$2.10
2	2½	Rock 'n' Pop	Matthew Cameron	Jason Bridgman	$9.40
3	Head	Carrick	Leith Innes	Tony Pike & Mark Donoghue	$13.90
4	2½	Chicharita	Lisa Cropp	Michael Moroney & Andrew Clarken	$8.90
5	1	Zurella	Jason Waddell	Shaune Ritchie	$14.10
6	Neck	Travolta	Mark Hills	John Kiernan	$39.80
7	3	Red Shift	Michael Coleman	Regan Donnison	$18.70
8	Neck	Roamin	Trudy Thornton	Robert Priscott & Clayton Chipperfield	$103.80
9	1½	Shuka	Hayden Tinsley	Peter & Dawn Williams	$9.20
10	1	Angelology	Kelly Myers	Kevin Myers	$14.60
11	½	Jeroboam	Chad Ormsby	Graham Richardson	$73.50
12	2	Colorado Sun	Patrick Holmes	Shane Crawford	$112.70
13	1½	Barney	Craig Grylls	Anne Herbert	$80.50
14	1	Guess What	Noel Harris	Paul Shailer	$72.80
15	½	Nine Pin	Danielle Johnson	Leo Molloy	$80.10
16	13	Mr Chez	Sam Spratt	Graeme & Debbie Rogerson	$37.10

== Winner's details ==
Further details of the winner, Silent Achiever:

- Foaled: 18 September 2008 in New Zealand
- Sire: O'Reilly; Dam: Winning Spree (Zabeel)
- Owner: K J Hickman
- Trainer: Roger James
- Breeder: K J Hickman
- Starts: 7
- Wins: 5
- Seconds: 1
- Thirds: 1
- Earnings: $621,150

=== The road to the Derby ===
Early-season appearances in 2011-12 prior to running in the Derby.

- Silent Achiever – 3rd Eight Carat Classic, 1st Championship Stakes, 1st Waikato Guineas, 1st Avondale Guineas
- Rock 'n' Pop – 2nd Ray Coupland Stakes, 1st New Zealand 2000 Guineas, 1st Karaka Mile, 3rd International Stakes
- Carrick – 3rd Avondale Guineas
- Chicarita – 1st Royal Stakes, 6th Sir Tristram Fillies' Classic
- Zurella – 1st Eulogy Stakes, 5th Royal Stakes, 1st Sir Tristram Fillies' Classic
- Travolta – 4th Avondale Guineas
- Red Shift – No stakes races
- Roamin – 5th Avondale Guineas
- Shuka – 1st Ray Coupland Stakes, 2nd Canterbury Stakes, 5th New Zealand 2000 Guineas, 4th Great Northern Guineas, 2nd Championship Stakes, 3rd Waikato Guineas, 2nd Avondale Guineas
- Angelology – No stakes races
- Jeroboam – No stakes races
- Colorado Sun - 8th Avondale Guineas
- Barney - 3rd Championship Stakes Prelude, 6th Championship Stakes, 7th Waikato Guineas
- Guess What - 4th Waikato Guineas, 11th Avondale Guineas
- Nine Pin - No stakes races
- Mr Chez - 4th Geelong Classic, 11th Victoria Derby, 6th Avondale Guineas

=== Subsequent Group 1 wins ===
Subsequent wins at Group 1 level by runners in the 2012 New Zealand Derby.

- Silent Achiever - New Zealand Stakes, Ranvet Stakes, The BMW Stakes
- Shuka - Captain Cook Stakes

== See also ==
- Recent winners of major NZ 3 year old races
- Desert Gold Stakes
- Hawke's Bay Guineas
- Karaka Million
- Levin Classic
- New Zealand 1000 Guineas
- New Zealand 2000 Guineas
- New Zealand Oaks
