= Willydoit =

New Zealand-bred Thoroughbred racehorse

- Sire: Tarzino
- Grandsire: Tavistock
- Dam: Willamette
- Damsire: More Than Ready
- Sex: Gelding
- Foaled: 18 September 2021
- Country: New Zealand
- Colour: Bay
- Breeder: Gerry Harvey
- Owner: B G Black, Mrs E L Clotworthy & MyRacehorse Pty Ltd
- Trainer: Shaun & Emma Clotworthy
- Record: 6:4-0-1
- Earnings: NZ$847,415

Major wins
- New Zealand Derby (2025)

Willydoit (foaled 18 September 2021) is a New Zealand racehorse and winner of the New Zealand Derby in 2025.

== Background ==
Willydoit was bred by Gerry Harvey and is a son of Westbury Stud stallion Tarzino, who himself won the Victoria Derby at Flemington Racecourse in 2015.

Westbury Stud offered Willydoit at the 2023 New Zealand Bloodstock National Yearling Sale at Karaka, where trainers Shaun and Emma Clotworthy bought him for $75,000.

Willydoit is owned by Emma Clotworthy, Bryan Black and hundreds of micro-share owners in a syndicate put together by the international MyRacehorse group.

== Racing career ==
Willydoit was unraced as a two-year-old and made his debut in the spring of his three-year-old season with a strong-finishing third over 1150 metres at Te Aroha.

All of his subsequent New Zealand starts came at Ellerslie Racecourse, where he rose to New Zealand Derby favouritism with three impressive victories in a row on 12 December 1 January and 1 February.

That burgeoning reputation was dented with an unplaced finish in the Avondale Guineas, which is traditionally regarded as a key lead-up to the New Zealand Derby two weeks later. Willydoit was a huge margin from the lead in a slowly run race, making little impression in the straight and finishing 10th behind the Australian raider Thedoctoroflove. The race time was 2:16.67, seven seconds slower than subsequent Derby winner Orchestral the previous year.

However, the Clotworthys were unfazed and pressed on towards their long-time goal, and Willydoit went down to the New Zealand Derby starting gate as a $3.70 equal favourite.

Ridden for the first time by Melbourne-based jockey Michael Dee, Willydoit was awkwardly drawn in gate 14 among a 16-horse field and was caught wide around the first turn. Dee elected to press forward, sliding up into third down the back straight. The two horses in front of him began to tire coming down the side of the track, and Willydoit marched forward to take command.

Willydoit kicked away in the straight and put himself well out of reach, winning by two and a quarter lengths from Thedoctoroflove and Golden Century.

== See also ==
- 2025 New Zealand Derby
