= Rocket Spade =

Australian-bred racehorse

- Sire: Fastnet Rock
- Grandsire: Danehill
- Dam: Affairoftheheart
- Damsire: Fusaichi Pegasus
- Sex: Colt
- Foaled: 21 October 2017 (age 8)
- Country: Australia
- Colour: Bay
- Breeder: Sun Kingdom
- Owner: Hermitage Thoroughbreds Pty Ltd
- Trainer: Lance O'Sullivan & Andrew Scott
- Record: 8:4-2-0
- Earnings: NZ$745,450

Major wins
- New Zealand Derby (2021)

Rocket Spade (foaled 21 October 2017) is an Australian-bred racehorse who is owned and trained in New Zealand. In 2021 he won the 146th running of the New Zealand Derby.

== Background ==
Rocket Spade was bred by Sun Kingdom in Australia and sold through the Inglis Sydney Easter Yearling Sale for A$425,000. He is by Fastnet Rock out of a Fusaichi Pegasus mare, whose half-sister Soriano won two Group One races in New Zealand.

== Racing career ==
=== 2019/20: three-year-old season ===
Trained by Lance O'Sullivan and Andrew Scott at Matamata, Rocket Spade made his debut on his home track in September 2020 with a strong come-from-behind win. He finished second in his second start, then ran fourth in the Group 2 Sarten Memorial at Te Rapa and fifth in the Group 1 New Zealand 2000 Guineas.

Upon his return to the north, Rocket Spade scored impressive wins in the Group 2 Auckland Guineas and Avondale Guineas, with a placing against older horses in between times.

Sent out as the favourite in the New Zealand Derby, Rocket Spade produced a strong finish from last to edge out Milford and Frontman in a three-way battle to the finish.

In April 2021 Rocket Spade was placed 8th in the Australian Derby behind Explosive Jack and Young Werther.

On 13 September 2021 Rocket Spade was exported to Hong Kong.

== See also ==
- 2021 New Zealand Derby
- Thoroughbred racing in New Zealand
