= Ruling Lad =

New Zealand-bred Thoroughbred racehorse

- Sire: Ruling
- Grandsire: Bold Ruler
- Dam: Lochiel's Fancy
- Damsire: Le Filou
- Sex: Colt
- Foaled: 1976
- Country: New Zealand
- Colour: Bay
- Owner: E N Baker
- Trainer: Brian Deacon
- Record: 22:3-0-1
- Earnings: $68,935

Major wins
- New Zealand Derby (1980)
- Last updated on February 26, 2008

Ruling Lad is a Thoroughbred racehorse who won the New Zealand Derby in 1979.

He produced an extraordinary performance to win the Derby for rider Garry Phillips, but never showed that ability in the rest of his career. In the 15 starts he had after his Derby win, he never finished closer than seventh.
