= Colin Jillings =

New Zealand racehorse trainer (1931–2022)

Personal information
- Full name: Colin Maurice Jillings
- Born: 11 March 1931 Auckland, New Zealand
- Died: 23 December 2022 (aged 91) Auckland, New Zealand
- Occupation: Horse trainer

Horse racing career
- Sport: Horse racing

Honours
- New Zealand Racing Hall of Fame

Significant horses
- Yeman, Lawful, McGinty, Brockton, Uncle Remus, I'm Henry, The Phantom Chance, Perhaps, Stipulate, Diamond Lover, Sharivari, Athenia, Tycoon Lil, Old Son, Sugartariat

Colin Maurice Jillings (11 March 1931 – 23 December 2022) was a New Zealand Thoroughbred horse racing trainer from the early 1950s until his retirement in September 2005. He is considered as one of the greatest trainers in thoroughbred horse racing in NZ. He was inducted into the New Zealand Racing Hall of Fame in 2008.

== Early life and career ==
Jillings was born in Auckland on 11 March 1931. He became an apprentice jockey at Ellerslie Racecourse at the age of 12 in 1943. After riding track work at Ellerslie each morning, he would catch the train to school at St Peter's College as one of the "Ellerslie Boys" who commuted there daily.

He was a successful apprentice jockey. His biggest success as an apprentice was the 1946 Railway Stakes aboard Royal Scot, a race he would later win three times as a trainer. Increasing weight brought a premature end to a promising Jockey career.

== Training career ==
When he retired he had amassed a total of 1327 New Zealand winners, 703 of those with long time training partner Richard Yuill.

When asked to name the best horse he ever trained Jillings had no hesitation in labelling Stipulate, the champion stayer of his era in the early 1960s. The fact that he had no hesitation in labelling Stipulate speaks volumes for the regard Jillings had for the horse given that he also trained the super little horse of the early 1980's – McGinty.

Jillings' biggest success came when he trained The Phantom Chance to win the 1993 W. S. Cox Plate. Although operating with a smaller team than some other trainers, Jillings managed to keep producing top horses year after year.

He trained the first of four Auckland Cup winners in 1956 Yeman, followed by Stipulate (1963), Perhaps (1976) and Irish Chance (in partnership with Richard Yuill) in 1999. He also achieved the unique record of training a Derby winner in each of the last 5 decades of the 20th Century: his first Derby winner being Lawful (1958) followed by Stipulate (1960), Uncle Remus (1977), I'm Henry (1983) and The Phantom Chance (1992).

== Notable horses ==
Notable horses he trained included:

- Athenia, winner of the 1978 New Zealand Oaks for his good friend T.J. (Tommy) Smith
- Beauzami, winner of the 1963 New Zealand Cup
- Diamond Lover, winner of the 1987 Railway Stakes
- Hot Ace, winner of the 1985 Waikato Guineas
- I'm Henry, winner of the New Zealand Derby, Avondale Guineas, Great Northern Guineas, Wellington Derby and Waikato Guineas in the 1983/84 season
- Irish Chance, winner of the 1999 Auckland Cup
- McGinty, winner of the Air New Zealand Stakes (twice), Rawson Stakes, Canterbury Guineas, Caulfield Stakes and George Adams Handicap
- Old Son, winner of the Ellerslie Sires Produce Stakes for himself and his good friend, Pukekohe market gardener, Pabu Daya
- Perhaps, winner of the 1976 Auckland Cup
- Pipe Dream, winner of the 1962 Railway Stakes
- Sedecrem, winner of 2004 and 2005 Waikato Sprint and the 2003 Easter Handicap
- Sharivari, winner of the 1971 Railway Stakes
- Stipulate, winner of the 1960 New Zealand Derby (Riccarton) and 1963 Auckland Cup
- Sugaratariat, winner of the Ellerslie Sires Produce Stakes
- The Phantom Chance, winner of the 1992 New Zealand Derby and the 1993 Turnbull Stakes and Cox Plate
- Tycoon Lil, winner of the 1997 New Zealand 1000 Guineas, 1998 New Zealand Oaks & Canterbury Guineas. Also 2nd and 3rd behind Might And Power in the 1998 Yalumba Stakes and Cox Plate
- Uncle Remus, winner of the 1977 New Zealand 2000 Guineas and New Zealand Derby
- Yeman, winner of the 1956 Auckland Cup and 1958 Wellington Cup

== Jumping ==
In his earlier years from limited runners, he was also a noted trainer of jumpers, winning:

- the 1959 Grand National Hurdles with Armed (owned by himself)
- the 1971 Great Northern Hurdles/Great Northern Steeplechase double and the 1972 Great Northern Steeplechase, with Brockton (for great friend, Wellington businessman, Doug Tse)
- the 1987 Great Northern Steeplechase with Deductable, in partnership with Richard Yuill (with both sharing the ownership).

== Apprentices ==
Jillings was also a noted mentor of apprentices. Among those he mentored was Bob Vance, who served as his stable jockey over a period of time and was a rider of:

- McGinty.
- 3 New Zealand Derby winners for Jillings: Uncle Remus, I'm Henry and The Phantom Chance. He also won the Derby with Isle Of Man for Davina Waddell.
- The Phantom Chance in the Cox Plate.

Vance won the NZ Jockeys Premiership, as an apprentice (1977/78) and had a successful career riding internationally in Hong Kong and Macau.

Other apprentices for Jillings were:

- Samantha Spratt: one of NZ's most successful female riders.
- Mark Sweeney: 2 Auckland Cup wins.
- Daniel Southworth: winner of the 1977 New Zealand 1000 Guineas and 1976 Railway Stakes.

== Retirement and death ==
Jillings' final race-day runner was Cheval De Troy who finished last behind Makybe Diva in the 2005 The BMW at Rosehill.

Jillings died in Auckland on 23 December 2022, at the age of 91.

== See also ==
- Thoroughbred racing in New Zealand

== Sources ==
- Glengarry, Jack (1983). The Great Decade of NZ Racing 1970 – 1980. Auckland: Collins.
- Glengarry, Jack (1990). Another Great Decade of NZ Racing 1980 – 1990. Auckland: Collins.
