= Cavallieri =

New Zealand-bred Thoroughbred racehorse

- Sire: Gaius
- Grandsire: Sallust
- Dam: Beycheville
- Damsire: Uncle Remus
- Sex: Colt
- Foaled: 1988
- Country: New Zealand
- Colour: Chestnut
- Breeder: P J & P M Vela
- Owner: L K Laxon, S Shew, F & Mrs Z Sing
- Trainer: L K Laxon
- Record: 42:3-4-3
- Earnings: $376,187

Major wins
- New Zealand Derby (1991)
- Last updated on July 3, 2007

Cavallieri is a thoroughbred racehorse only known for winning the 1991 New Zealand Derby, when he defeated subsequent champion racehorse Veandercross. He also ran third in the 1992 AJC Australian Derby behind Naturalism and Veandercross.

Cavallieri was a one-paced stayer, and never tasted the same glory again, retiring with just three wins to his name after poor showings in several major staying races. He stood at stud in New Zealand briefly before being sold overseas.

He is a son of the relatively obscure stallion Gaius.
