= Crown Prosecutor (horse) =

Australian-bred Thoroughbred racehorse

- Sire: Medaglia d'Oro
- Grandsire: El Prado
- Dam: Riptide
- Damsire: Exceed And Excel
- Sex: Colt
- Foaled: 19 September 2015
- Country: Australia
- Colour: Dark Bay/Brown
- Breeder: Hesket Bloodstock
- Owner: Huntingdale Lodge 2012 Ltd (Mgr: Harvey Green) & JML Bloodstock Ltd (Mgr: L Petagna)
- Trainer: Stephen Marsh
- Record: 7: 2-0-2
- Earnings: NZ$644,625

Major wins
- New Zealand Derby (2019)

Crown Prosecutor (foaled 19 September 2015) is an Australian-bred New Zealand racehorse, best-known for an upset victory in the 144th running of the New Zealand Derby.

== Background ==
Crown Prosecutor is a dark bay/brown colt by the multiple Grade One-winning American shuttle stallion Medaglia d'Oro out of the Exceed And Excel mare Riptide. He was bred by Hesket Bloodstock in Victoria, Australia. He was bought for A$50,000 at the 2017 Inglis Melbourne Premier Sale.

== Racing career ==
Trained by Stephen Marsh, Crown Prosecutor began his career in October 2018 with sixth and third placings over 1200 metres and 1400 metres respectively. He stepped up in class for his third start and scored a front-running victory in the Group 3 Wellington Stakes.

Unplaced in the Levin Classic and Waikato Guineas, Crown Prosecutor was a 105-to-one outsider for the New Zealand Derby at Ellerslie. However, with Craig Grylls in the saddle, he surged to the lead in the straight and held out determined rival In A Twinkling by a head.

== See also ==
- 2019 New Zealand Derby
