= Palentino =

Australian-bred Thoroughbred racehorse

- Sire: Teofilo
- Grandsire: Galileo
- Dam: Palatine Hill
- Damsire: Palace Music
- Sex: Stallion
- Foaled: 18 October 2012
- Country: Australia
- Colour: Chestnut
- Owner: Boom Rat Racing, Bool Derby Boys, J Cox, Dadoco Racing, Sunday Knight, Don't Tell Her, M Johnston, S Everett, P Bourk, T Ginnane, G White, J Collins, M Atchison, J Whiteman, G Mcnulty, M Mckenzie & Forest Lodge Racing Pty Ltd
- Trainer: Darren Weir
- Record: 18-5-3-0
- Earnings: A$1,305,110

Major wins
- Australian Guineas (G1)(2016); Makybe Diva Stakes (G1)(2016); Blamey Stakes (G2)(2017)
- Last updated on 6 November 2017

Palentino (foaled 18 October 2012) is a retired Thoroughbred racehorse and active sire trained and bred in Australia. He won the Australian Guineas and Makybe Diva Stakes, both Group One races. He won over 1.3 million dollars.

== Career ==
Bred at Macleay Thoroughbred Stud in Tasmania, by Geoff and Jenny Watson, Palentino was sold as a yearling for $85,000.

He had his first race at Ballarat on 30 September 2015, finishing 2nd by a head and winning $3910. A fortnight later, he had his first win at Stawell.

On 7 November 2015, Palentino contested a listed race for the first time, winning by over a length at Flemington. Jockey Michelle Payne, who had recently won the Melbourne Cup, said, "Darren sent him to the beach and I didn't know what to expect today. He's progressed with each trial and run and is shaping as a horse in the making."

After a 3 month spell, Palentino returned in the Group 3 Manfred Stakes. After being held up, he finished 7th in what was called an "unlucky" run.

On 20 February 2016, Palentino was first past the post in the C S Hayes Stakes, but was reduced to 2nd on protest, after opposing jockey Craig Williams claimed there was interference 900 metres from the finish line. The decision to strip Palentino of victory was, "met with a chorus of outrage from disgruntled racing fans across the country."

A fortnight later, Palentino was again subject to a protest after finishing first in the Group 1 Australian Guineas, with Tarzino's jockey Craig Newitt claiming interference with 600 metres remaining and again in the straight. This time the protest was dismissed, with stewards saying the opposing horse had also rolled towards Palentino. Jockey Mark Zahra said, "It was a shame we had to go through all that because you can’t enjoy the moment and then you have to sweat it out. It means a lot and I said after last time, I’ll cop that as long as we win the Guineas."

Palentino's next appearance was in the Friday night Alister Clark Stakes at Moonee Valley. After hitting the lead earlier than expected, he weakened in the final 100 metres and finished second behind Tally.

Palentino returned in a listed race in August 2016 and was then unplaced in the Memsie. Returning to Flemington in September for the Group 1 Makybe Diva Stakes, he was first past the post for the fourth straight appearance at the track. Beating stablemate Black Heart Bart by a length, Zahra said, "He’s a genuine superstar. You’d love the Cox Plate to be here. The way he settled and found the line, there’s no reason why not to go for it. Today his turn of foot was electric." Palentino contested another three Group 1 races for the rest of the campaign, failing to finish better than 8th. Travelling to Sydney for the first time, he came last in the Epsom Handicap.

Following its usual pattern of commencing a campaign with a shorter race, Palentino finished 4th in the 1200 metre Australia Stakes and then 4th again in the C F Orr Stakes. Back at Flemington for the Group 2 Blamey Stakes, Palentino won the race, 3 lengths ahead of favourite Tosen Stardom. Darren Weir noted, "Today he did everything perfect."

In April 2017, Palentino was retired to stud. Its 2018 and 2019 stud fee was $17,600.
