= Kaiser (horse) =

New Zealand-bred Thoroughbred racehorse

- Sire: Ruling
- Grandsire: Bold Ruler
- Dam: Sovereign Lass
- Damsire: Sovereign Edition
- Sex: Colt
- Foaled: 1975
- Country: New Zealand
- Colour: Brown
- Owner: T J & Mrs Doole
- Trainer: Neville Atkins

Major wins
- New Zealand Derby (1979)
- Last updated on February 26, 2008

Kaiser is a Thoroughbred racehorse who won the New Zealand Derby in 1978. He was trained by Neville Atkins.

Like Ruling Lad, who won the race the following year, Kaiser was a son of Ruling, who himself was a son of Bold Ruler.

His Derby winning time, 2:29.42, was at the time the second-fastest in the history of the race.
