= New Zealand Derby =

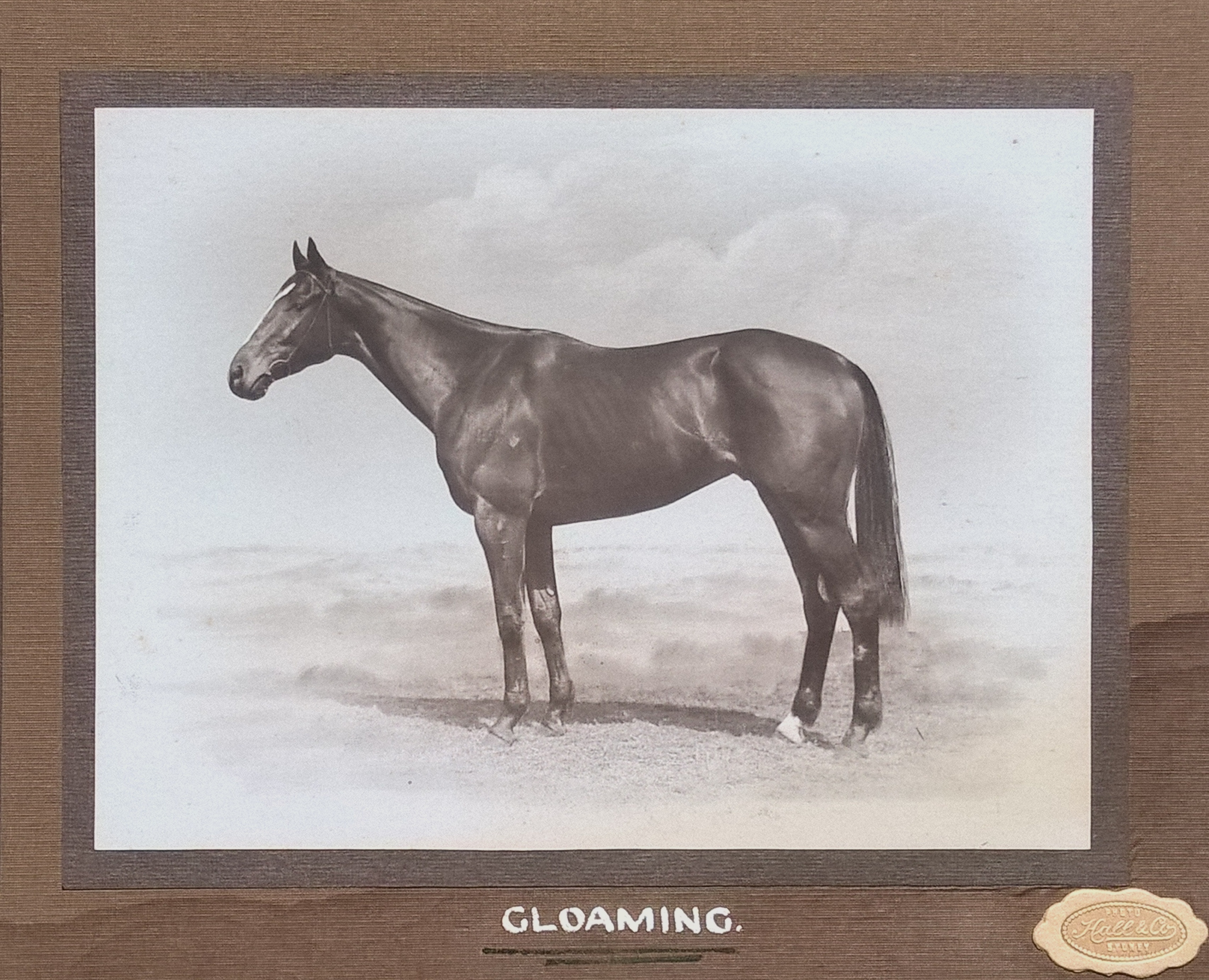
- Gloaming, 1918 winner
- Class: Group I
- Location: Ellerslie Racecourse; Auckland, New Zealand
- Inaugurated: 1875
- Race type: Thoroughbred – Flat racing
- Website: Ellerslie Racecourse

Race information
- Distance: 2,400 metres (12 furlongs)
- Surface: Turf
- Track: Right-handed
- Qualification: Three-year-olds
- Weight: Set-Weights
- Purse: NZ$1,250,000 (2025)

The New Zealand Derby is a set-weights Thoroughbred horse race for three-year-olds, run over a distance of 2,400 metres (12 furlongs) at Ellerslie Racecourse in Auckland, New Zealand. It is held in March each year.

== History ==
The New Zealand Derby is an amalgamation of two races – the New Zealand Derby, run since 1860 at Riccarton, Christchurch; and the Great Northern Derby, run since 1875 at Ellerslie Racecourse in Auckland. The races were combined in 1973. Riccarton was awarded two 1,600 m races for three-year-olds in place of its Derby – the New Zealand 2000 Guineas and New Zealand 1000 Guineas.

After its May debut, the New Zealand Derby was soon moved to New Year's Day, and then to Boxing Day. It continued to be run on this day for many years and became a popular traditional social occasion for Aucklanders until it was moved to the first day of the new Auckland Cup Week in March. The first March running of the Derby in 2006 was won by Wahid, from the stable of Allan Sharrock in New Plymouth.

The 2023 edition - won by Sharp 'N' Smart - was held at Te Rapa Racecourse, due to renovation of the track at Ellerslie Racecourse.

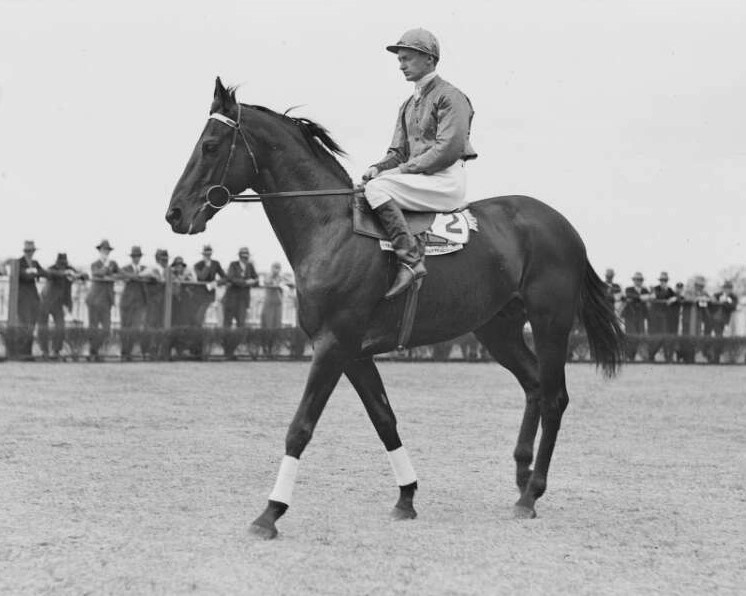
Nightmarch, 1928 winner.

=== Notable winners ===
Many of New Zealand's most famous racehorses feature on the list of New Zealand Derby winners, including:

- Desert Gold,
- Gloaming,
- Nightmarch,
- Kindergarten,
- Mainbrace,
- Balmerino,
- Bonecrusher,
- Xcellent,
- Jimmy Choux,
- Silent Achiever,
- Mongolian Khan.

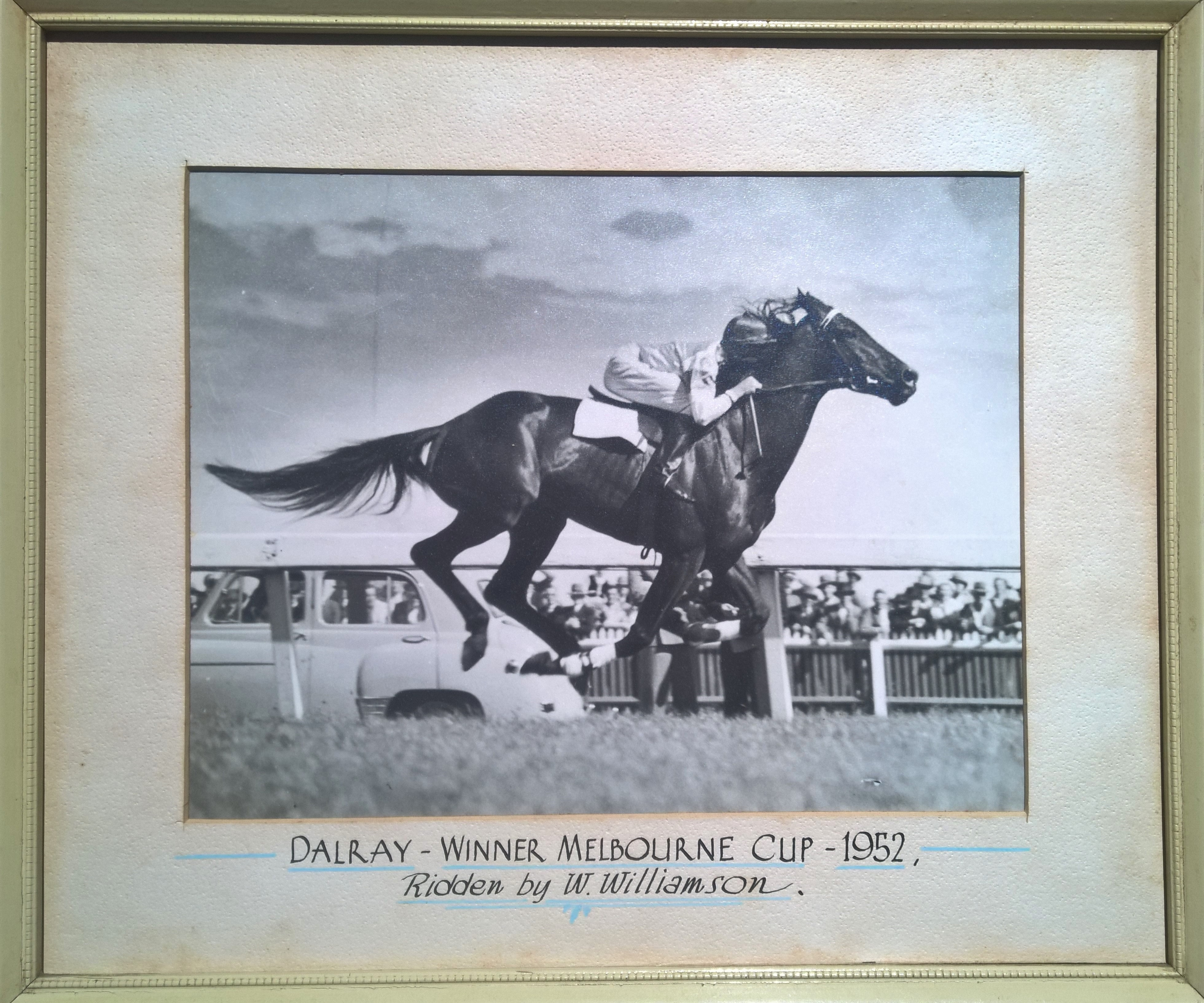
Dalray, 1951 winner.

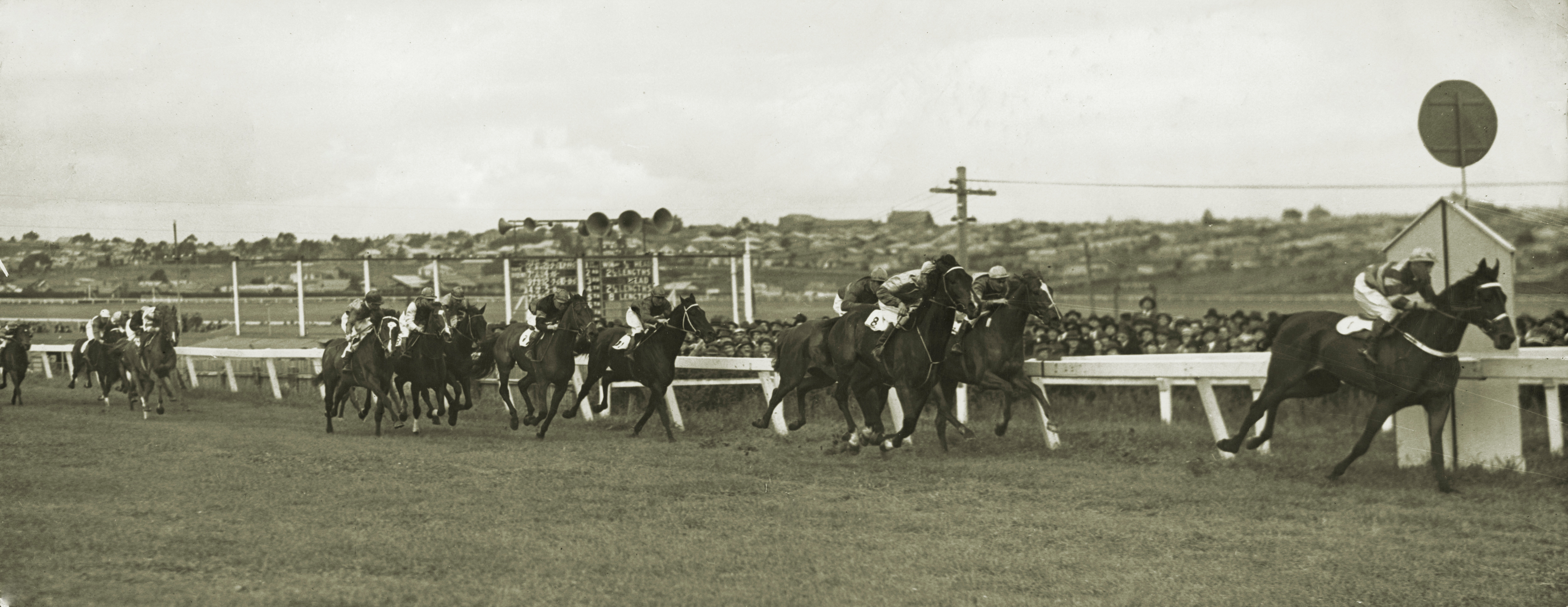
Nightly, 1933 winner.

=== Multiple winning trainers and jockeys ===
Roger James has won the New Zealand Derby seven times, including once in partnership with Jim Gibbs and once in partnership with Robert Wellwood. Colin Jillings won the post-1973 New Zealand Derby three times but also twice won the Great Northern Derby with Lawful and Stipulate.

Vinnie Colgan holds the record for the most Derby wins by a jockey. He scored his fifth Derby win aboard Habibi in 2013, breaking Robert Vance's previous record of four, and added a sixth victory with Rangipo in 2016.

=== Winning fillies ===
Only a small number of fillies have ever won the Derby against the male horses. This list includes:

- the great Desert Gold winning the 1915 New Zealand Derby at Riccarton and the 1916 Great Northern Derby
- Our Flight in 1983
- Tidal Light in 1986
- Popsy in 1994
- Silent Achiever in 2012
- Habibi in 2013
- Orchestral in 2024.

On two of those occasions, fillies have also finished second – Cure in 1986 and Fix in 2013.

== New Zealand Derby results ==
Year	Winner	Breeding	Jockey	Trainer	Owner	Time	Second	Third
2026	Road To Paris	Circus Maximus – Spirit Of Heaven	George Rooke	Roger James & Robert Wellwood	Ron & Judi Wanless	2:31.25 (soft)	Autumn Glory	Geneva
2025	Willydoit	Tarzino – Willamette (Aus)	Michael Dee	Shaun & Emma Clotworthy, Byerley Park	B G Black, Mrs E L Clotworthy & MyRacehorse Pty Ltd	2:30.08 (soft)	Thedoctoroflove	Golden Century
2024	Orchestral	Savabeel – Symphonic	Craig Grylls	Roger James & Robert Wellwood	Colin & Helen Litt	2:26.79 (good)	Antrim Coast	Ascend The Throne
2023	Sharp 'N' Smart	Redwood – Queen Margaret	Ryan Elliot	Team Rogerson	Graeme Rogerson, Todd Bawden, C A Leishman, NZ Thoroughbred Holdings Ltd, M & M Butterworth & M B Wadd	2:29.47 (Te Rapa, good)	Andalus	Full of Sincerity
2022	Asterix	Tavistock – Mourasana (GB) by Shirocco	Johnathan Parkes	Lance O'Sullivan & Andrew Scott	D & B Kelt, A & L Scott & Mark Greatbatch	2:27.24 (good)	La Crique	Regal Lion
2021	Rocket Spade	Fastnet Rock – Affairoftheheart (by Fusaichi Pegasus)	Craig Grylls	Lance O'Sullivan & Andrew Scott	Hermitage Thoroughbreds Pty Limited	2:35.51 (soft)	Milford	Frontman
2020	Sherwood Forest	Fastnet Rock- Chasing Mammom (by Giant's Causeway)	Michael Walker	Tony Pike	Goodson & Perron Family Trust, Calder Bloodstock Ltd & Deborah Martin	2:26.77	Two Illicit	Scorpz
2019	Crown Prosecutor	Medaglia d'Oro – Riptide (by Exceed and Excel)	Craig Grylls	Stephen Marsh	Huntingdale Lodge 2012 Ltd (Mgr: Harvey Green) & Jml Bloodstock Ltd (Mgr: L Petagna)	2:28.17	In A Twinkling	Platinum Invador
2018	Vin De Dance	Roc de Cambes – Explosive Dancer (by San Luis)	Jason Waddell	Murray Baker & Andrew Forsman	OTI Racing (Mgr: T Henderson), L Muollo & Kilted Taniwha Syndicate	2:28.44	Mongolianconqueror	Danzdanzdance
2017	Gingernuts	Iffraaj – Double Elle (by Generous)	Opie Bosson	Stephen Autridge & Jamie Richards	Te Akau Gingernuts Syndicate	2:28.27	Rising Red	Jon Snow
2016	Rangipo	Stryker – Holloway (by Zabeel)	Vincent Colgan	Tony Pike	John & Margaret Thompson	2:28.89	What's The Story	Raghu
2015	Mongolian Khan	Holy Roman Emperor – Centafit (by Centaine)	Opie Bosson	Murray Baker & Andrew Forsman	Inner Mongolia Rider Horse Industry	2:28.40	Volkstok'n'barrell	Sound Proposition
2014	Puccini	Encosta De Lago – Miss Opera (by Paris Opera)	Michael Walker	Peter & Jacob McKay	Monovale Holdings Ltd	2:28.39	Rising Romance	Glorious Lad
2013	Habibi	Ekraar – Danny Holiday (by Danasinga)	Vincent Colgan	Donna & Dean Logan	Mrs Heather & Peter Crofskey & Mrs P A McIntyre	2:27.58	Fix	Castlzeberg
2012	Silent Achiever	O'Reilly – Winning Spree (by Zabeel)	James McDonald	Roger James	K J Hickman	2:33.55	Rock 'n' Pop	Carrick
2011	Jimmy Choux	Thorn Park – Cierzo (by Centaine)	Jonathan Riddell	John Bary	Chouxmaani Investments Ltd.	2:38.35	Historian	On The Level
2010	Military Move	Volksraad – All Night Party (by Just A Dancer)	Michael Walker	Shaune Ritchie	Steven Lo	2:27.91	Corporal Jones	Handsome Zulu
2009	Coniston Bluebird	Scenic – Turbo Lady (by Bellotto)	Scott Seamer	Bede Murray	Murray Livestock, J O'Brien, J & R Standford & J Wilson	2:31.04	Down The Road	Tell A Tale
2008	C'est La Guerre	Shinko King – La Magnifique (by Kampala)	David Walker	Kevin Myers, Wanganui	K Barker, JNW Brookes, DA Gascoigne & KT Myers	2:33.47	Prince Kaapstad	Fritzy Boy
2007	Redoute's Dancer	Redoute's Choice – Condescendance (by El Gran Senor)	Vincent Colgan	Tim Martin, Rosehill	P. Silvestro	2:27.24 (good)	Mettre En Jeu	Uberalles
2006	Wahid	Almutawakel – Rory's Helen (by Rory's Jester)	Leith Innes	Allan Sharrock	Noel H. & Ron T. Stanley	2:27.42 (good)	Roman Chariot	Charliehorse
2005	not raced (¹)	—	—	—	—	—	—	—
2004	Xcellent	Pentire – Excelo (by Centro)	Michael Coleman	Michael Moroney	G W Breingan, G K V Holdings Ltd, M J Gatt, P A Heath, D A Nicholson & Wellington Racing Syndicate	2:32.01	Mandela	King Johny
2003	Cut the Cake	Yamanin Vital – Icing On The Cake (by Straight Strike)	Michael Coleman	Michael Moroney & Andrew Scott	N M Anderson, G W Breingan, G J N Jaggaer, T T Manning, Paul Moroney & A P Ramsden	2:28.88	Mount Street	Masai
2002	St Reims	Zabeel – L'Quiz (by L'Enjoleur)	Greg Childs	Chris McNab	Rob McAnulty et al.	2:28.57 (good)	Kajema	Woburn
2001	Leica Guv	Deputy Governor – Leica Or Not (by Kendor)	Scott Seamer	Jeff McVean	R A and Mrs R J Scarborough	2:28.98 (good)	Athens	Sixty Seconds
2000	Hail	Stark South – Valley Court (by Pompeii Court)	Noel Harris	Bruce Marsh	Alistair Cunningham & Bruce Marsh	2:32.27 (good)	Sir Clive	Ma Victoire
1999	Hades	Zabeel – Annas Choice (by Vice Regal)	Vincent Colgan	Roger James, Matamata	Mrs F E & R A Dixon	2:27.57	Hill Of Grace	Idol
1998	So Casual 55.5	Casual Lies – Some Reason (by Sound Reason)	Damien Oliver	Ross Taylor	G C P Beadel et al.	2:24.80 (good)	El Duce 56	Nahayan 56
1997	Zonda 55.5	Zabeel – Gone With The Wind (by Light Wind)	Vincent Colgan	Roger James	Hundalee Derby Syndicate	2:31.58 (good)	Bluebird The Word 56	Star Of Mercury 56
1996	Great Command	Marscay – Tisolde (by Tights)	Darren Beadman	Michael Moroney, Matamata	H J & J Chan, R R McAnulty & D Tsang	2:27.97	Heroes Return	Captain Moonlight
1995	Roysyn 55.5	Bakharoff – Royal Proposal (by Vice Regal)	Vincent Colgan	Roger James	Mrs B P & J B Harvey	2:30.10 (good)	Clear Rose 56	Interval 53
1994	Look Who's Talking	Grosvenor – Glenreign (by Sovereign Edition)	Grant Cooksley	Nigel Tiley	Unifaith Limited	2:28.18	Avedon	Cataldo
1993	Popsy 53	Sir Tristram – Beks (by In The Purple)	Lance O'Sullivan	Dave & Paul O'Sullivan	Barnaby & Co Ltd	2:27.24	Shatin Heights 55.5	Seascay 55.5
1992	The Phantom Chance 55.5	Noble Bijou – The Fantasy (by Gate Keeper)	Robert Vance	Colin Jillings & Richard Yuill	W B Ballin	2:25.98	Kaaptive Edition 55.5	Sun Raycer 55.75
1991	Cavallieri 55.5	Gaius – Beycheville (by Uncle Remus	Grant Cooksley	Laurie Laxon	Laurie Laxon, S Shew & F & Mrs Z Sing	2:29.18	Veandercross 55.5	Te Akau Nick 55.5
1990	Surfers Paradise	Crested Wave – Lady Aythorpe (by Aythorpe)	Lance O'Sullivan	Dave & Paul O'Sullivan	F Cheung, K Chong, G Fong & J D Smith	2:28.02	Corndale	Sir Alberton
1989	Castletown	One Pound Sterling – Mona Curragh (by Levmoss)	Bruce Compton	Patrick Busuttin	Patrick Busuttin, Barney McCahill & K P Morris	2:29.28	Renteeno	Just A Dancer
1988	The Gentry 55.5	McGinty – Rainfall (by Le Filou)	Greg Childs	Ray & Kerry Verner	L W Davis, H Keith Haub, P J Walker & Haunui Farm	2:27.49 (good)	Lou Morton 55.5	Krona 55.5
1987	Satisfy 55.5 (²)	Top Quality – Gold Flake (by Allgrit)	Maurice Campbell	Nick Nicoloff	N D & P H Nicoloff	2:35.41 Dead	Accountant 55.5	Na Botto 55.5
1986	Tidal Light	Diagramatic – Azores (by King Of Babylon)	Grant Cooksley	Jim Gibbs and Roger James	S A Taylor	2:28.63	Cure	The Bishop
1985	Bonecrusher	Pag-Asa (Aus)- Imitation (by Oakville)	Gary Stewart	Frank Ritchie	Peter J. Mitchell	2:29.47	Flight Bijou	Random Chance
1984	Jolly Jake	Three Legs – Honeypot (by Sucaryl)	Chris McNab	Alan Jones	Ivan W Allan	2:27.39	Dusky Legend	Avana
1983	I'm Henry	Entrepreneur – Ina Bahroo (by Bahroona)	Robert Vance	Colin Jillings	A J & M M Bates	2:29.78	Jurango	Zepherin
1982	Our Flight	Imperial Guard – Jane Flight (by Mellay)	Maurice Campbell	Errol Skelton	J W Rusher	2:32.48	Secured Deposit	Glamour Star
1981	Isle of Man 55.5	Habitation – Full O'Tricks (by Trictac)	Robert Vance	Davina Waddell	Ron F Langsford and Davina L Waddell	2:28.89 (good)	Rose And Thistle 55.5	Tomatin Purple 55.5
1980	Ring the Bell	Rangong – Witchcraft (by Mystery)	Nigel Tiley	Neville Atkins, Waiuku	E M Mackley and B P Wild	2:30.23 (firm)	Amyl	Summertime Lad
1979	Ruling Lad	Ruling – Lochiel's Fancy (by Le Filou)	Garry Phillips	Brian Deacon, Hawera	E N Baker	2:35.38 (easy)	Eruption	Banabar
1978	Kaiser	Ruling – Sovereign Lass (by Sovereign Edition)	Alwin Tweedie	Neville Atkins, Waiuku	T J and Mrs Doole	2:29.42 (firm)	Caucus	Sound Wave
1977	Uncle Remus	Bandmaster – Tusitala (by Talismano)	Robert Vance	Colin Jillings, Takanini	Kim F Clotworthy and Mrs Grace M Donaldson	2:29.51 (firm)	Bahrain	Boom Vang
1976	Silver Lad	Silver Dream – Leta Filou (by Le Filou)	Des Wyatt	Barry Petley	D and Mrs Nicholls and R R Peel-Walker	2:29.76	Mayo Mellay	Sonic Light
1975	Balmerino	Trictrac – Dulcie (by Duccio)	Maurice Campbell	Brian Smith	Ralph K Stuart	2:31.21	Caboodle	Lucky Strike
1974	Mansingh	Wilkes – Starquita (by Star Kingdom)	Bob Skelton	Ray Wallace & Randall Coleman, Takanini	David V Beetham	2:29.2	Ripbang	Rosie’s Girl
1973	Furys Order	Indian Order – Our Fury (by Le Filou)	Des Harris	Wally McEwan, Hawera	Len H Bridgeman	2:35	Jandell	Tinryland Lass

(¹) Not run in 2005 with change of date from December to March.
(²) In the 1987 race, Accountant was first past the post, but relegated.

== Winners of the New Zealand Derby at Riccarton ==
Note: the New Zealand Derby (Riccarton) and the Great Northern Derby were combined into one race at Ellerslie in 1973.

- 1860 Ada
- 1861 Otto
- 1862 Emmeline
- 1863 Azucena
- 1864 Opera
- 1865 Egremont
- 1866 Nebula
- 1867 Scandal
- 1868 Flying Jib
- 1869 Manuka
- 1870 Envy
- 1871 Defamation
- 1872 Calumny
- 1873 Papapa
- 1874 Tadmor
- 1875 Daniel O'Rourke
- 1876 Songster
- 1877 Trump Card
- 1878 Natator
- 1879 Hornby
- 1880 Sir Modred
- 1881 The Dauphin
- 1882 Cheviot
- 1883 Oudeis
- 1884 Black Rose
- 1885 Stonyhurst
- 1886 Disowned
- 1887 Maxim
- 1888 Manton
- 1889 Scots Grey
- 1890 Medallion
- 1891 Florrie
- 1892 Stepniak
- 1893 Skirmisher
- 1894 Blue Fire
- 1895 Euroclydon
- 1896 Uniform
- 1897 Multiform
- 1898 Altair
- 1899 Seahorse
- 1900 Renown
- 1901 Menschikoff
- 1902 Orloff
- 1903 Roseal
- 1904 Nightfall
- 1905 Noctiform
- 1906 Zimmerman
- 1907 Elevation
- 1908 Husbandman
- 1909 Elysian
- 1910 Danube
- 1911 Masterpiece
- 1912 Bon Reve
- 1913 Cherubini
- 1914 Balboa
- 1915 Desert Gold
- 1916 The Toff
- 1917 Estland
- 1918 Gloaming (AUS)
- 1919 Rossini
- 1920 Duo
- 1921 Winning Hit
- 1922 Enthusiasm
- 1923 Black Ronald
- 1924 Count Cavour
- 1925 Runnymede
- 1926 Commendation
- 1927 Agrion
- 1928 Nightmarch
- 1929 Honour
- 1930 Cylinder
- 1931 Bronze Eagle (AUS)
- 1932 Silver Scorn
- 1933 Nightly
- 1934 Sporting Blood
- 1935 Lowenberg
- 1936 Wild Chase
- 1937 Royal Chief
- 1938 Defaulter
- 1939 Beaulivre
- 1940 Enrich
- 1941 Battledress
- 1942 Rink
- 1943 Tara King
- 1944 Pensacola
- 1945 Al-Sirat
- 1946 Royal Tan
- 1947 Liebestraum
- 1948 St. Bruno
- 1949 Beaumaris
- 1950 The Unicorn
- 1951 Dalray
- 1952 Programme
- 1953 Idaho
- 1954 Port Boy
- 1955 Syntax
- 1956 Passive
- 1957 William Paul
- 1958 Up and Coming
- 1959 Sol d'Or
- 1960 Blue Lodge
- 1961 Burgos
- 1962 Algalon
- 1963 Royal Duty
- 1964 Trial Offer
- 1965 Roman Consul
- 1966 Fair Account
- 1967 Jazz
- 1968 Pep
- 1969 Piko
- 1970 Fairview Lad
- 1971 Master John
- 1972 Classic Wave

== Earlier winners (Great Northern Derby) ==
Note: the New Zealand Derby (Riccarton) and the Great Northern Derby were combined into the one race at Ellerslie in 1973.

- 1875 – Toi
- 1876 – Ariel
- 1877 – Danebury
- 1878 – Venus Transit
- 1879 – Omega
- 1880 – Libeller
- 1881 – Tim Whiffler
- 1882 – Fitz Hercules
- 1883 – Welcome Jack
- 1884 – Nelson
- 1885 – Tigridia
- 1886 – Foul Shot
- 1887 – Disowned
- 1888 – Sextant
- 1889 – Cuirassier
- 1890 – Tirailleur
- 1891 – Medallion
- 1892 – Morion
- 1893 – St. Hippo
- 1894 – Loyalty
- 1895 – Stepfeldt
- 1896 – Fabulist
- 1897 – Nestor
- 1898 – St. Crispin
- 1899 – Blue Jacket
- 1900 – Miss Delaval
- 1901 – Renown
- 1902 – Menschikoff
- 1903 – Wairiki
- 1904 – Gladsome
- 1905 – Gladstone
- 1906 – Multifid
- 1907 – Zimmerman
- 1908 – Boniform
- 1909 – Husbandman
- 1910 – Kilwinning
- 1911 – Danube
- 1912 – Counterfeit
- 1913 – Bon Reve
- 1914 – Cherubini
- 1915 – Reputation
- 1916 – Desert Gold
- 1917 – Sasanof
- 1918 – Estland
- 1919 – Gloaming
- 1920 – Royal Stag
- 1921 – Gasbag
- 1922 – Winning Hit
- 1923 – Enthusiasm
- 1924 – Ballymena
- 1925 – Count Cavour
- 1926 – Star Stranger
- 1927 – Commendation
- 1928 – Martarma
- 1929 – Red Heckle
- 1930 – Hunting Cry
- 1931 – Karapoti
- 1932 – Bronze Eagle
- 1933 – Silver Scorn
- 1934 – Red Manfred
- 1935 – Gay Blonde
- 1936 – Greek Shepherd
- 1937 – Essex
- 1938 – Courtcraft
- 1939 – Defaulter
- 1940 – Beau Vite
- 1941 – Kindergarten
- 1942 – Regal Fox
- 1943 – Indian Princess
- 1944 – Expanse
- 1945 – Coronaire
- 1946 – Lady Foxbridge
- 1947 – Beau Le Havre
- 1948 – Sweet Nymph
- 1949 – Tauloch
- 1950 – Sweet Spray
- 1951 – Mainbrace
- 1952 – Dalray
- 1953 – Programme
- 1954 – Fox Myth
- 1955 – Somerset Fair
- 1956 – Syntax
- 1957 – Passive/Gibraltar
- 1958 – Lawful
- 1959 – Gitano
- 1960 – Stipulate
- 1961 – Cracksman
- 1962 – Tatua
- 1963 – Ichtar
- 1964 – Sobig
- 1965 – Peterman
- 1966 – Star Belle
- 1967 – Ben Lomond
- 1968 – Bardall
- 1969 – Piko
- 1970 – Kirrama
- 1971 – Master John
- 1972 – Corroboree

== See also ==
- New Zealand Derby (Riccarton) forerunner of the New Zealand Derby
- Great Northern Derby forerunner of the New Zealand Derby
- Auckland Cup
- Desert Gold Stakes
- Hawke's Bay Guineas
- Karaka Million
- Levin Classic
- New Zealand 1000 Guineas
- New Zealand 2000 Guineas
- New Zealand Oaks
- Recent winners of major NZ 3 year old races

== Reference list ==
- N.Z. Thoroughbred Racing Inc.
- Racenet - Australia's Premier Horse Racing News, Form Guides & Tips
- New Zealand Horse Racing Statistics and Information - RaceBase
- The Great Decade of New Zealand racing 1970-1980. Glengarry, Jack. William Collins Publishers Ltd, Wellington, New Zealand
