= Mongolian Khan =

Australian-bred Thoroughbred racehorse

- Sire: Holy Roman Emperor
- Grandsire: Danehill
- Dam: Centafit
- Damsire: Centaine
- Sex: Stallion
- Foaled: 19 October 2011
- Country: Australia
- Colour: Bay
- Breeder: Grenville Stud
- Owner: Inner Mongolia Rider Horse Group
- Trainer: Murray Baker & Andrew Forsman
- Record: 9:7-0-0
- Earnings: NZ$625,500 & A$1,312,250

Major wins
- Waikato Guineas (2015); Avondale Guineas (2015); New Zealand Derby (2015); Australian Derby (2015); Caulfield Cup (2015)

Mongolian Khan (foaled 19 October 2011) is a retired Australian-bred New Zealand-trained Thoroughbred racehorse and breeding stallion. In 2015 he won the 140th running of the New Zealand Derby before going on to win the Australian Derby becoming the first horse to complete the double in 29 years. As a four-year-old he won the Caulfield Cup.

== Background ==
Mongolian Khan was foaled at Graeme McCulloch's Grenville stud at Whitemore in Northern Tasmania, Australia, in October 2011. He is a half-brother to Wellington Cup winner Young Centaur, which is why McCulloch decided to sell him in New Zealand in partnership with Ainsley Downs Stud. He was brought to New Zealand by Courtney Howells of Ainsley Downs Stud (Waikato, New Zealand) as a weanling and prepared for the Karaka yearling sales, where he was on sold for $140 000.

== Racing career ==
=== 2014/15: three-year-old season ===
Mongolian Khan won on debut at Te Rapa at odds greater than 40 to one, but failed in the Group Two Hawke's Bay Guineas in his second career start. Once he stepped up over a mile and beyond he proved a revelation, winning five in a row including the 3yo Salver, Waikato Guineas, Avondale Guineas and New Zealand Derby.

The New Zealand Derby was billed as a match race with Volkstok'n'barrell, who had created a big impression of his own in winning five races in a row including the Bonecrusher Stakes, Great Northern Guineas and Karaka Mile. The eagerly anticipated clash lived up to expectations as the two exciting three-year-olds drew well clear of their rivals and fought a memorable struggle down the home straight. Having been clearly headed by Volkstok'n'barrell, Mongolian Khan fought back and proved too strong in the concluding stages, edging away to win by one length. There was a margin of more than five lengths back to the remainder of the field.

Mongolian Khan then travelled to Australia, where he finished a disappointing fifth in the Rosehill Guineas. He bounced back impressively from that, however, winning the Australian Derby strongly from Hauraki and his arch-rival Volkstok'n'barrell. In doing so he became the first horse to win the New Zealand Derby-Australian Derby double since Bonecrusher in 1986.

=== 2015/16: four-year-old season ===
Mongolian Khan began his four-year-old season by finishing seventh to Fawkner in the Makybe Diva Stakes at Flemington Racecourse on 12 September and then ran fourth to Mourinho in the Underwood Stakes at Caulfield two weeks later. At the same track on 10 October the colt finished third in the Caulfield Stakes behind Criterion and Happy Trails. On 17 October, Mongolian Khan started the 4/1 favourite in an eighteen-runner field for the Caulfield Cup. He took the lead 400 metres from the finish and won by half a length from the British challenger Trip To Paris.

== Stud career ==
After retiring from the race track, Mongolian Khan has stood at the Cambridge nursery for Windsor Park Stud. In his initial stud season, 2016, his service fee was $10,000

In 2023 Mongolian Khan was purchased by Jang Jun Stud in Hongyuan County, in China’s Sichuan Province.

=== Notable progeny ===
c = colt, f = filly/mare, g = gelding

Foaled	Name	Sex	Dam	Damsire	Major wins / placings
2017	Bankers Choice	g	Signorina	Conatus (Aus)	2025 Mornington Cup (2400m), 2022 Anniversary Handicap (G3, 1600m)
2020	Khanshe	f	Folies Bergere	O'Reilly	2026 Travis Stakes (G2, 2000m)

== Pedigree ==
Pedigree of Mongolian Khan (AUS), bay colt 2011
Sire Holy Roman Emperor (IRE) 2004	Danehill (USA); 1986	Danzig	Northern Dancer
Sire Holy Roman Emperor (IRE) 2004	Danehill (USA); 1986	Danzig	Pas de Nom
Sire Holy Roman Emperor (IRE) 2004	Danehill (USA); 1986	Razyana	His Majesty
Sire Holy Roman Emperor (IRE) 2004	Danehill (USA); 1986	Razyana	Spring Adieu
Sire Holy Roman Emperor (IRE) 2004	L'On Vite (USA); 1986	Secretariat	Bold Ruler
Sire Holy Roman Emperor (IRE) 2004	L'On Vite (USA); 1986	Secretariat	Somethingroyal
Sire Holy Roman Emperor (IRE) 2004	L'On Vite (USA); 1986	Fanfreluche	Northern Dancer
Sire Holy Roman Emperor (IRE) 2004	L'On Vite (USA); 1986	Fanfreluche	Ciboulette
Dam Centafit (NZ) 1992	Centaine (AUS); 1980	Century	Better Boy
Dam Centafit (NZ) 1992	Centaine (AUS); 1980	Century	Regal Suite
Dam Centafit (NZ) 1992	Centaine (AUS); 1980	Rainbeam	Vain
Dam Centafit (NZ) 1992	Centaine (AUS); 1980	Rainbeam	Rain Shadow
Dam Centafit (NZ) 1992	Galopede (NZ); 1983	Three Legs	Petingo
Dam Centafit (NZ) 1992	Galopede (NZ); 1983	Three Legs	Teodora
Dam Centafit (NZ) 1992	Galopede (NZ); 1983	Regal Step	Imperial March
Dam Centafit (NZ) 1992	Galopede (NZ); 1983	Regal Step	Aristocrcacy (Family: 10-d)

== See also ==
- 2015 New Zealand Derby
- Thoroughbred racing in New Zealand
