= Redoute's Dancer =

Australian-bred Thoroughbred racehorse

- Sire: Redoute's Choice
- Grandsire: Danehill
- Dam: Condescendance
- Damsire: El Gran Senor
- Sex: Colt
- Foaled: 24 August 2003
- Country: Australia
- Colour: Bay
- Breeder: Milburn Creek Thoroughbred Stud
- Owner: P Silvestro
- Trainer: Tim Martin
- Record: 9: 4-2-0
- Earnings: $616,200

Major wins
- New Zealand Derby (2007)
- Last updated on 3 July 2007

Redoute's Dancer (foaled 24 August 2003) is a Thoroughbred racehorse who won the New Zealand Derby in 2007.

Having competed in Sydney throughout the early part of his three-year-old season, the connections of the son of Redoute's Choice decided to chase a Group 1 win for the colt and high prize money in New Zealand.

He had one start in New Zealand before the Derby in the Championship Stakes on the same course, a race which has been won by the last two Derby winners. He won the race easily before impressively beating the best New Zealand had to offer in the 2007 Derby.

The horse had only two starts after his New Zealand Derby win, running a creditable sixth in the Rosehill Guineas before failing on a wet track in the AJC Derby.

Redoute's Dancer was retired to stud at Touchstone Farm in Western Australia. A number of leading studs in the Hunter Valley were looking to stand him but prominent Western Australian businessman Paul Silvestro who owns Redoute's Dancer wanted him to stand in Western Australia.

== See also ==
- Thoroughbred racing in New Zealand
