= Cut the Cake (horse) =

New Zealand-bred Thoroughbred racehorse

Cut The Cake
- Sire: Yamanin Vital
- Grandsire: Sir Tristram
- Dam: Icing On The Cake
- Damsire: Straight Strike
- Sex: Gelding
- Foaled: 26 October 2000
- Country: New Zealand
- Colour: Bay
- Breeder: Paul Moroney
- Owner: N M Anderson, G W Breingan, G J N Jagger, T T Manning, P A Moroney & A P Ramsden
- Trainer: Michael Moroney
- Record: 32:4-1-2
- Earnings: $353,339

Major wins
- New Zealand Derby (2003)
- Last updated on July 3, 2007

Cut The Cake (foaled 26 October 2000) is a Thoroughbred racehorse who won the New Zealand Derby in 2003.

Coming into the Derby as a winner of only a maiden at Matamata, the gelding was not among the favourites for the Group 1 race. But after being given a beautiful rails ride by Michael Coleman, he simply outstayed his rivals and won by a long head with favourite Mount Street in second place.

The win gave Paul Moroney, who has bought countless Group 1 winners at sales all around the world, the first Group 1 winner he has actually bred.

Cut The Cake was expected to go on and become a leading stayer after his Derby win, but he has been disappointing in only winning two races since, one of which was over hurdles. He ran his last race in 2006.
