= Vin De Dance =

New Zealand-bred Thoroughbred racehorse

- Sire: Roc de Cambes
- Grandsire: Red Ransom
- Dam: Explosive Dancer
- Damsire: San Luis
- Sex: Gelding
- Foaled: 13 September 2014
- Country: New Zealand
- Colour: Bay
- Breeder: Explosive Breeding Ltd
- Owner: OTI Racing (Mgr: T Henderson), L Muollo & Kilted Taniwha Syndicate
- Trainer: Murray Baker & Andrew Forsman
- Record: 9: 2-2-2
- Earnings: NZ$639,969

Major wins
- New Zealand Derby (2018)

Vin De Dance (foaled 13 September 2014, died 2021) is a New Zealand racehorse, part-owned by Australian syndicators OTI Racing. As a three-year-old, he won the 143rd running of the New Zealand Derby.

== Background ==
Vin De Dance is a bay gelding by Roc de Cambes out of the San Luis mare Explosive Dancer. He was bred by Explosive Breeding Ltd, and he was a $70,000 purchase at the Ready to Run Sale at Karaka.

== Racing career ==
Vin De Dance made his debut on 6 September 2017 in a 1200-metre race on a heavy track at Pukekohe Park, winning by a length and three-quarters. He finished second in his next two starts, then travelled to Melbourne for a third at Flemington and a fifth in the Moonee Valley Vase.

He resumed in late January with a fourth over 1400 metres, then finished sixth over 1600 metres and third in the Avondale Guineas.

In the 2018 New Zealand Derby, Vin De Dance raced in midfield before taking the lead inside the last 300 metres. Mongolianconqueror moved up alongside him and the pair fought a two-horse duel to the finish line, which Vin De Dance won by a nose.

Vin De Dance competed in Sydney during the autumn carnival, finishing second in the Rosehill Guineas (later relegated to fourth due to interference in the home straight) and fourth again in the Australian Derby.

Vin De Dance died in 2021.

== See also ==
- 2018 New Zealand Derby
- Thoroughbred racing in New Zealand
