= 2016 New Zealand Derby =

The 2016 New Zealand Derby was a horse race, which took place at Ellerslie Racecourse on Saturday 5 March 2016. It was the 141st running of the New Zealand Derby, and it was won by Rangipo.

In what was widely considered to be an unusually even Derby field, Rangipo brought strong form into the race with wins in the Great Northern Guineas, Waikato Guineas and Avondale Guineas. Being a son of speedy Australian stallion Stryker, the main question mark hanging over his credentials was his stamina for the 2400-metre test.

But after sitting midfield behind a solid early pace, Rangipo moved into contention in the home straight and held on strongly to beat the fast-finishing What's The Story by a short head. The winner's stablemate Raghu was third, ahead of fillies Capella and Valley Girl who came with big late finishes from well back in the field.

It was the first New Zealand Derby win for trainer Tony Pike and a sixth for jockey Vinnie Colgan.

== Race details ==
- Sponsor: BMW
- Prize money: NZ$750,000
- Track: Dead
- Number of runners: 18
- Winner's time: 2:28.89

== Full result ==
	Margin	Horse	Jockey	Trainer(s)	Odds
1		Rangipo	Vinnie Colgan	Tony Pike	$4.80
2	Short head	What's The Story	Sam Spratt	Stephen McKee & Eddie Chippendale	$13.70
3	Head	Raghu	Michael Walker	Tony Pike	$10.40
4	Short neck	Capella	Leith Innes	Danica Guy	$9.50
5	Short head	Valley Girl	Danielle Johnson	Donna Logan & Chris Gibbs	$5.60
6	1½	Tavago	Noel Callow	Trent Busuttin & Natalie Young	$21.60
7	1	Predator	Jonathan Riddell	Trent Busuttin & Natalie Young	$36.20
8	½	Get That Jive	Opie Bosson	Murray Baker & Andrew Forsman	$6.80
9	Nose	The Hassler	Michael Coleman	Roger James	$16.20
10	½	Brighton	Lee Tiley	Nigel Tiley	$11.70
11	3	Humidor	Mark Du Plessis	Johno Benner & Hollie Wynyard	$21.10
12	1½	Piece Of Kate	Shaun McKay	Gavin Sharrock	$128.40
13	Nose	Splendido	Grant Cooksley	Bruce Wallace	$39.50
14	1½	Thunder Down Under	Johnathan Parkes	Stephen Ralph	$62.80
15	3½	En Suite	Rosie Myers	Kevin Myers	$77.30
16	10	Prodigal Son	Trudy Thornton	Graeme & Debbie Rogerson	$130.80
17	4	Gobstopper	Craig Grylls	Andrew Campbell	$82.00
18	7	Son Of Maher	Chris Johnson	Michael & Matthew Pitman	$31.60

== Winner's details ==
Further details of the winner, Rangipo:

- Foaled: 10 August 2012 in Australia
- Sire: Stryker; Dam: Holloway (by Zabeel)
- Owner: John & Margaret Thompson
- Trainer: Tony Pike
- Breeder: John Thompson
- Starts: 12
- Wins: 7
- Seconds: 0
- Thirds: 1
- Earnings: $684,570

=== The road to the Derby ===
Early-season appearances in 2015-16 prior to running in the Derby.

- Rangipo - 1st Great Northern Guineas, 1st Waikato Guineas, 1st Avondale Guineas, 3rd Levin Classic
- What's The Story - 6th Trevor Eagle Memorial, 7th Great Northern Guineas
- Raghu - 1st Karaka Mile, 2nd Waikato Guineas, 3rd Avondale Guineas
- Capella - 1st Eight Carat Classic, 3rd Sir Tristram Fillies' Classic
- Valley Girl - 1st Herbie Dyke Stakes, 3rd Eight Carat Classic, 5th Royal Stakes
- Tavago - 1st Wellington Stakes, 3rd Karaka Mile, 13th Waikato Guineas
- Predator - 7th Avondale Guineas
- Get That Jive - 2nd Great Northern Guineas, 3rd Waikato Guineas, 3rd Avondale Guineas
- The Hassler - 5th Avondale Guineas
- Brighton - 2nd Avondale Guineas, 4th New Zealand 2000 Guineas, 6th Karaka Mile, 8th Great Northern Guineas
- Splendido - 2nd BMW Salver, 6th Zabeel Classic
- Thunder Down Under - 1st BMW Salver, 3rd Bonecrusher Stakes, 5th Karaka Mile, 7th Trevor Eagle Memorial, 9th Waikato Guineas, 10th Zabeel Classic, 11th Avondale Guineas
- Son Of Maher - 1st Dunedin Guineas, 2nd Levin Classic, 6th New Zealand 2000 Guineas, 9th Avondale Guineas

=== Subsequent Group 1 wins ===
Subsequent wins at Group 1 level by runners in the 2016 New Zealand Derby.

- Tavago - Australian Derby
- Humidor - Australian Cup, Makybe Diva Stakes

== See also ==
- Recent winners of major NZ 3 year old races
- Desert Gold Stakes
- Hawke's Bay Guineas
- Karaka Million
- Levin Classic
- New Zealand 1000 Guineas
- New Zealand 2000 Guineas
- New Zealand Oaks
