= 2015 New Zealand Derby =

The 2015 New Zealand Derby was a horse race which took place at Ellerslie Racecourse on Saturday 28 February 2015. It was the 140th running of the New Zealand Derby, and it was won by Mongolian Khan.

The race was billed as a match race between the highly rated Mongolian Khan and Volkstok'n'barrell, both of which had made a big impression in stringing together consecutive wins in major races throughout the summer. The eagerly anticipated clash lived up to expectations as the two exciting three-year-olds drew well clear of their rivals and fought a memorable struggle down the home straight. Having been clearly headed by Volkstok'n'barrell, Mongolian Khan fought back and proved too strong in the concluding stages, edging away to win by one length. There was a margin of more than five lengths back to the remainder of the field.

It was the first New Zealand Derby win for trainers Murray Baker and Andrew Forsman and rider Opie Bosson.

Mongolian Khan later went to Australia and won the Australian Derby at Randwick, becoming the first horse to win the New Zealand Derby-Australian Derby double since Bonecrusher in 1986. Volkstok'n'barrell won the Rosehill Guineas and was third in the Australian Derby.

== Race details ==
- Sponsor: TV3
- Prize money: NZ$750,000
- Track: Good
- Number of runners: 17
- Winner's time: 2:28.40

== Full result ==
| | Margin | Horse | Jockey | Trainer(s) | Odds |
|---|---|---|---|---|---|
| 1 | | Mongolian Khan | Opie Bosson | Murray Baker and Andrew Forsman | $4.00 |
| 2 | 1 | Volkstok'n'barrell | Matt Cameron | Donna & Dean Logan | $2.30 |
| 3 | 5½ | Sound Proposition | Danielle Johnson | Lance O'Sullivan & Andrew Scott | $21.50 |
| 4 | Neck | Dee I Cee | Rosie Myers | Kevin Myers | $42.50 |
| 5 | ½ | Midnitemagicman | Vinnie Colgan | Donna & Dean Logan | $26.70 |
| 6 | ¾ | Sealed By A Dance | Reese Jones | Kevin Myers | $127.20 |
| 7 | ¾ | Margin Trader | Rhys McLeod | Michael Moroney & Chad Ormsby | $43.80 |
| 8 | ½ | Vavasour | Leith Innes | Peter & Dawn Williams | $6.40 |
| 9 | ½ | Chenille | Rory Hutchings | Tony Pike | $18.70 |
| 10 | ¾ | Prima | Mark Du Plessis | Doug Cave | $21.60 |
| 11 | Nose | Nymph Monte | Derek Nolan | Grant Nicholson | $198.90 |
| 12 | 1 | Giant Turtle | Mark Hills | Bruce Wallace | $36.50 |
| 13 | ½ | Gifted Lad | Craig Grylls | Trent Busuttin & Natalie Young | $37.90 |
| 14 | 4 | McQueen | Samantha Collett | Jim Collett | $27.60 |
| 15 | ½ | Gaultier | Michael Coleman | Danica Guy | $95.20 |
| 16 | ½ | J'Walke | Dylan Turner | Wayne Jones | $236.40 |
| 17 | 34 | Twya | Mark Sweeney | Graeme Sanders & Debbie Sweeney | $141.80 |

== Winner's details ==
Further details of the winner, Mongolian Khan:

- Foaled: 19 October 2011 in Australia
- Sire: Holy Roman Emperor; Dam: Centafit (Centaine)
- Owner: Inner Mongolia Rider Horse Club
- Trainer: Murray Baker & Andrew Forsman
- Breeder: Grenville Stud
- Starts: 7
- Wins: 6
- Seconds: 0
- Thirds: 0
- Earnings: $625,500

=== The road to the Derby ===
Early-season appearances in 2014-15 prior to running in the Derby.

- Mongolian Khan – 1st 3yo Salver, 1st Waikato Guineas, 1st Avondale Guineas
- Volkstok'n'barrell – 1st Bonecrusher Stakes, 1st Great Northern Guineas, 1st Karaka Mile, 3rd Avondale Guineas
- Sound Proposition – 6th Avondale Guineas
- Dee I Cee – no stakes races
- Midnitemagicman – 2nd Trevor Eagle Memorial, 3rd 3yo Salver, 4th Avondale Guineas
- Sealed By A Dance – no stakes races
- Margin Trader – 5th Great Northern Guineas, 5th Waikato Guineas, 9th Avondale Guineas
- Vavasour – 3rd Soliloquy Stakes, 2nd Royal Stakes, 1st Sir Tristram Fillies' Classic
- Chenille – no stakes races
- Prima – 3rd Waikato Guineas, 2nd Avondale Guineas
- Nymph Monte – 13th Avondale Guineas
- Giant Turtle – 2nd Waikato Guineas
- Gifted Lad – no stakes races
- McQueen – 4th Waikato Guineas, 5th Avondale Guineas
- Gaultier – 1st Levin Classic, 11th Waikato Guineas, 8th Avondale Guineas
- J'Walke – 12th Avondale Guineas
- Twya – 1st Wanganui Guineas, 3rd Bonecrusher Stakes, 6th Sarten Memorial, 11th Avondale Guineas

=== Subsequent Group 1 wins ===
Subsequent wins at Group 1 level by runners in the 2015 New Zealand Derby.

- Mongolian Khan - Australian Derby, Caulfield Cup
- Volkstok'n'barrell - Rosehill Guineas, Otaki-Maori Weight for Age

== See also ==
- Recent winners of major NZ 3 year old races
- Desert Gold Stakes
- Hawke's Bay Guineas
- Karaka Million
- Levin Classic
- New Zealand 1000 Guineas
- New Zealand 2000 Guineas
- New Zealand Oaks
