= Sherwood Forest (horse) =

Australian-bred Thoroughbred racehorse

- Sire: Fastnet Rock
- Grandsire: Danehill
- Dam: Chasing Mammon
- Damsire: Giant's Causeway
- Sex: Gelding
- Foaled: 1 September 2016
- Country: Australia
- Colour: Bay
- Breeder: Goodson & Perron Family Trust
- Owner: Goodson & Perron Family Trust, Calder Bloodstock Ltd & Deborah Martin
- Trainer: (1) Tony Pike (2) Bill Thurlow
- Record: 25:4-0-3-3
- Earnings: NZ$771,367

Major wins
- New Zealand Derby (2020)

Sherwood Forest (foaled 1 September 2016) is an Australian-bred racehorse who is owned and trained in New Zealand. In 2020 he won the 145th running of the New Zealand Derby.

== Background ==
Sherwood Forest was bred in Australia and sold through the Magic Millions Gold Coast Yearling Sale. He is by Fastnet Rock out of a Giant's Causeway mare. Foaled and raised at Coolmore Australia, he is a full-brother to the stakes winner Royal Ocean.

== Racing career ==
=== 2018/19: two-year-old season ===
Sherwood Forest raced three times as a two-year-old. He finished fourth on debut at Te Rapa in February, then ran sixth in the Listed Champagne Stakes and seventh in the Listed Auckland Futurity Stakes.

=== 2019/20: three-year-old season ===
After beginning his season with a maiden win at Ruakaka, Sherwood Forest stepped up to stakes class and finished fifth in the Group 2 Hawke's Bay Guineas. He then travelled to the South Island, where he won the Group 3 War Decree Stakes before a strong third in the Group 1 New Zealand 2000 Guineas.

Trainer Tony Pike believed Sherwood Forest would come into his own over longer distances through the later part of the season, and so it proved. After a fourth in the Group 2 Auckland Guineas, he defeated older horses over 2200 metres at Te Aroha, then ran third in the Group 2 Avondale Guineas.

Sherwood Forest was slightly overlooked in the lead-up to the New Zealand Derby, with attention dominated by the spectacular Waikato Guineas winner Two Illicit and Avondale Guineas winner Dragon Leap.

But Sherwood Forest's superior stamina shone through, poking through between that pair in the straight and surging clear for an emphatic win ridden by Michael Walker. The time of 2:26.77 was the fastest New Zealand Derby since 1998.

After the Derby win Sherwood Forest went to Australia to compete. In March he was 7th behind Castelvecchio in the 2000m Rosehill Guineas and in April 8th to Quick Thinker in the 2400m Australian Derby at Randwick Racecourse.

=== Subsequent seasons ===
In September 2020 Sherwood Forest dropped out of the 1400m JRA Trophy at Ellerslie with lameness, the race won by Two Illicit who had been runner up to it in the New Zealand Derby. However Sherwood Forest returned to the track with a late finishing 5th at Hastings in March 2021, behind Vigor Winner. In April 2021 he was 4th in the Hawkes Bay Cup behind Big Mike.

In September 2021 Sherwood Forest was taken to Victoria, Australia, and competed without success in three races. He returned to some form when placed 3rd to Hunta Pence in the Taupo Cup on 30 December 2021 and 5th in the 2022 Trentham Stakes behind Waisake.

In mid 2022 Sherwood Forest was transferred to the stable of Bill Thurlow at Waverley.

== See also ==
- 2020 New Zealand Derby
- Thoroughbred racing in New Zealand
