= Rangipo (horse) =

Australian-bred Thoroughbred racehorse

- Sire: Stryker
- Grandsire: Fastnet Rock
- Dam: Holloway
- Damsire: Zabeel
- Sex: Gelding
- Foaled: 10 August 2012
- Country: Australia
- Colour: Bay
- Breeder: John Thompson
- Owner: John & Margaret Thompson
- Trainer: Tony Pike
- Record: 12:7-0-1
- Earnings: NZ$684,570

Major wins
- Waikato Guineas (2016); Avondale Guineas (2016); New Zealand Derby (2016)

Rangipo (foaled 10 August 2012) is an Australian-bred racehorse who is owned and trained in New Zealand. In 2016 he won the 141st running of the New Zealand Derby.

== Background ==
Rangipo was foaled in Victoria and comes from the first crop of the Australian stallion Stryker. His dam Holloway is a half-sister to stakes winners Maze, Barlinnie and Penitentiary.

== Racing career ==
=== 2014/15: two-year-old season ===
Rangipo raced twice as a two-year-old, finishing eighth and fifth over 1000 and 1200 metres.

=== 2015/16: three-year-old season ===
After winning three of his first four starts of the season, Rangipo stepped up to stakes class and finished fourth in the Wellington Stakes. He took a big step forward to win the Great Northern Guineas at Ellerslie on New Year's Day, then finished third in the Levin Classic at Trentham. Wins in the Waikato and Avondale Guineas followed before he scored a determined victory in the 2016 New Zealand Derby.

== See also ==
- 2016 New Zealand Derby
- Thoroughbred racing in New Zealand
