= Habibi (horse) =

New Zealand-bred Thoroughbred racehorse

- Sire: Ekraar
- Grandsire: Red Ransom
- Dam: Danny Holiday
- Damsire: Danasinga
- Sex: Filly
- Foaled: 4 September 2009
- Country: New Zealand
- Colour: Brown
- Breeder: H J & P J Crofskey
- Owner: G P, H J & P J Crofskey & P A McIntyre
- Trainer: Donna & Dean Logan
- Record: 15-4-1-3

Major wins
- New Zealand Derby (2013); Championship Stakes (2013)
- Last updated on 3 March 2013

Habibi (foaled 4 September 2009) is a New Zealand thoroughbred racehorse. She is most noted for winning the 2013 New Zealand Derby; one of only five fillies since 1980 to achieve this feat. She was trained by Donna and Dean Logan.

Habibi made her raceday debut in October 2012, winning at her home track of Ruakaka. Wins at Avondale and Ellerslie followed, before she was asked to take on the top male three-year-olds over the Ellerslie Christmas Carnival. This decision proved successful, with Habibi easily winning both the Great Northern Guineas on Boxing Day and the Championship Stakes on New Year's Day. These wins made her unbeaten in five starts, and saw her become a clear favourite for the New Zealand Derby. A solid run for third in the Avondale Guineas was her only subsequent lead-up run to the Derby.

In the Derby, she started from the inside barrier, settled four-back on the rail before getting clear in the straight and running down another filly, Fix, for a half-length win. The victory gave rider Vinnie Colgan his fifth success in the New Zealand Derby, the most of any rider since the race was moved to Ellerslie in 1973.

After the Derby win Habibi went to Australia and raced:

- 3rd in the Vinery Stud Storm Queen Stakes (Group 1, 2000m, Rosehill) behind Norzita and Longport
- 4th in the Australian Oaks (ATC) (Group 1 2400m, Randwick) behind Royal Descent and Dear Demi

She then went to the United States and Canada, racing at Santa Anita, Woodbine and Gulfstream Park gaining a win and two placings in nine American starts. Her last race was in February 2016.

== See also ==
- 2013 New Zealand Derby
- Thoroughbred racing in New Zealand
