= Championship Stakes =

Horse race in Auckland, New Zealand

- Class: Group III
- Location: Ellerslie Racecourse; Auckland, New Zealand
- Race type: Thoroughbred - Flat racing
- Website: www.ellerslie.co.nz

Race information
- Distance: 2100m (10.5 furlongs)
- Surface: Turf
- Track: Right-handed
- Qualification: Three-year-olds
- Weight: Set-Weights
- Purse: $120,000 (2026)

The Championship Stakes, run at Ellerslie Racecourse, is a Group 3 horse race run for three-year-olds at Ellerslie Racecourse in Auckland, New Zealand.

== History ==
When the New Zealand Derby was moved from December to March in the 2005–06 season, the race was set up to be run on the second Saturday in February as the main-lead-up race, two weeks before the Derby. Before this the race had been restricted to fillies only.

In 2011, the race was moved New Year's Day, with the Avondale Guineas (previously run in December at Avondale and the main Derby lead-up before 2005) moving to Ellerslie and taking the February date. Since 2015, the Championship Stakes has been held in mid/late April. It is raced on the same date as the Easter Handicap.

The race has been sponsored by:

- Trelawney Stud
- Valachi Downs

== Notable winners ==
The race has been won by a number of New Zealand Derby winners:

- 2013 Habibi
- 2012 Silent Achiever
- 2007 Redoute's Dancer
- 2006 Wahid

The 2005 winner Tusker also won the 2006 Awapuni Gold Cup.

Werther, the 2015 winner, went on to win the 2015 Eagle Farm Cup, Hong Kong Derby, the 2016 Audemars Piguet Queen Elizabeth II Cup, the 2017 Hong Kong Gold Cup, the Hong Kong Champions & Chater Cup and Bochk Jockey Club Cup. It was runner up in the South Australian Derby, Queensland Derby, Hong Kong Classic Mile, Hong Kong Classic Cup, the Longines Hong Kong Cup and the 2018 Hong Kong Gold Cup.

== Race results ==
Year	Winner	Sire	Dam	Jockey	Trainer(s)	Time	Second	Third
April 2026	Solid Gold 55	Savabeel	Gram	George Rooke	Roger James & Robert Wellwood	2:14.03 (soft)	La Diem 55	Glance 55
April 2025	Kiwi Skyhawk 57	Contributer (Ire)	Pouter (Aus)	Matt Cartwright	Stephen Marsh	2:12.88 (soft)	Zormella 55	Roctave 57
April 2024	Moonlight Magic 55	Almanzor	Japonica (Aus)	Craig Grylls	Andrew Forsman	2:13.16 (soft)	Solidify 57	First Innings 57
April 2023 (Pukekohe)	Chevel D'Or 55	Almanzor	Keepa Cheval	Michael McNab	Tony Pike	2:22.36 (heavy)	Sassyness 55	Kentucky Rose 55
April 2022 (Pukekohe)	Pinarello 57	Tavistock (NZ)	Zonza	Leith Innes	Roger James & Robert Wellwood	2:10.10 (good)	Titled 57	Lingjun Xiongfeng 57
April 2021	Hezashocka 56.5	Shocking	Shezakiwi	Masa Hashizume (a)	Shaun & Emma Clotworthy	2:18.45 (slow)	Joy Alone 54.5	Milford Sound 56.5
April 2019	Lord Arthur 56.5	Camelot (GB)	Imposingly (Aus)	Jake Baylis	Murray Baker & Andrew Forsman	2:07.89	Intrigue 54.5	Bobby Dee 56.5
April 2018	Azaboy 56.5	Azamour (Ire)	Cataari (NZ)	Samantha Collett	Richard Collett	2:22.04 (heavy)	Gundown (Aus) 56.5	Time Lord 56.5
April 2017	Tavidream 56.5	Tavistock (NZ)	Cinnadream (Aus)	Alysha Collett	Donna Logan & Chris Gibbs	2:13.91 (soft)	Charles Road (Aus) 56.5	Camino Rocoso 56.5
April 2016	The Hassler 56.5	Shocking (Aus)	Zaquabeel (NZ)	Vincent Colgan	Roger James	2:12.26 (good)	Zambezi Warrior 56.5	Sonorous 56.5
April 2015	Werther 56.5	Tavistock (NZ)	Bagolollies (Aus)	Leith Innes	Andrew Campbell	2:18.31 (soft)	Exquisite Jewel 54.5	Viva La Difference (Aus) 54.5
January 2014	Show The World 56.5	High Chaparral (Ire)	Bazelle (NZ)	Opie Bosson	Murray Baker & Andrew Forsman	2:12.58 (dead)	Blizzard 56.5	High Tower 56.5
January 2013	Habibi 54.5	Ekraar (US)	Danny Holiday (NZ)	Vincent Colgan	Donna & Dean Logan	2:09.01 (good)	Addictive Habit 56.5	Solar Eclipse 56.5
January 2012	Silent Achiever 54.5	O'Reilly (NZ)	Winning Spree (NZ)	Vincent Colgan	Roger James	2:18.14 (slow)	Shuka 56.5	Lady Krovanh (Aus)
January 2011	Hidden Asset 56	High Chaparral	Fragile Asset (NZ)	James McDonald	Shaune Ritchie	2:10.39 (good)	Hot Pursuit 54.5	Yourein (Aus) 56
Feb 2010	Zarzuela 54.5	Zabeel (NZ)	Star Satire (NZ)	James McDonald	Mark Walker	2:08.35 (good)	Corporal Jones 56	King Raedwald 56
Feb 2009	Down The Road 56	Danroad (Aus)	Dixies Girl (NZ)	Michael Coleman	Ken Kelso & Thomas Russell	2:15.52 (soft)	The Meista 56	Coniston Bluebird 56
Feb 2008	Red Ruler 56	Viking Ruler (Aus)	Ransom Bay (USA)	Vincent Colgan	John Sargent	2:10.61 (good)	Six O'Clock News 56	Pierre Joseph 56
Feb 2007	Redoute's Dancer 56	Redoute's Choice (Aus)	Condescendance (US)	Vincent Colgan	Tim Martin, Rosehill	2:11.17 (good)	Benedict 56	Stolen Thunder 56
Feb 2006	Wahid 56	Almutawakel (GB)	Rory's Helen (NZ)	Leith Innes	Alan Sharrock	2:09.21 (good)	Black Panther 56	Twinkling 54.5
Mar 2005	Tusker 55	Volksraad (GB)	Stella Artois (NZ)	Noel Harris	Murray Baker	2:10.41	El Bulli 55	Zaria 55
Feb 2004	Boulevardofdreams 55	Daggers Drawn (US)	Faustina (NZ)	Gary Grylls	Vanessa & Wayne Hillis	2:18.04 (soft)	Partee 55	Haylee Baylee 55
Mar 2003	Raspberry Ripple (Aus) 55	Quest For Fame (GB)	Unbeleevable (NZ)	Lance O'Sullivan	Craig & Frank Ritchie	2:14.34 Slow	Etoile Du Nord 55	Showgirl 55
Mar 2002	Sixty Seconds 55	Centaine (Aus)	Fifteen Reasons (NZ)	Bruce Herd	Roger James	2:16.26 (easy)	Venus Was Her Name 55	Vapour Trail 55
Mar 2001	Elevenses 55	Star Way (GB)	Celtic Joy (NZ)	Mark Sweeney	Graeme & Debbie Sanders	2:10.50	Piper Star 55	Gordon’s 55
Mar 2000	Let's Cruise (NZ) 55	Zabeel (NZ)	Lady Bay (NZ)	Jim Collett	Mark Walker	2:09.08	Giovana 55	Sarwatch 55
March 1999	Dancing Daze 55	Dance Floor (USA)	War Cry	Lance O'Sullivan		2:11.30 (easy)	Scarlet Runner 55	Soap Opera 55
Feb 1998	Crimson 55	Zabeel (NZ)	Bourbon Lassie (NZ)	David Walsh		2:09.35	Melora 55	Limerick 55
March 1997	Ellakapella 55	Pompeii Court (US)	Santona (NZ)	Jim Collett		2:15.94 (dead)	Ballroom Lady 55	Tricia Ann 55

Ref:

== See also ==
- Thoroughbred racing in New Zealand
