= Uncle Remus (horse) =

New Zealand-bred Thoroughbred racehorse

- Sire: Bandmaster
- Grandsire: Sovereign Path
- Dam: Tusitala
- Damsire: Talismano
- Sex: Colt
- Foaled: 1974
- Country: New Zealand
- Colour: Brown
- Owner: Kim F Clotworthy & Mrs Grace M Donaldson
- Racing colors: Tangerine, Black Band, Royal Blue Armbands and Cap
- Trainer: Colin Jillings
- Record: 28:15-4-1
- Earnings: $137,275

Major wins
- New Zealand Derby (1977); New Zealand 2000 Guineas (1977)
- Last updated on February 26, 2008

Uncle Remus was a champion Thoroughbred racehorse who won the New Zealand Derby and New Zealand 2000 Guineas in the 1977–78 season.

== Racing career ==
Uncle Remus was trained by Colin Jillings who had five Derby victories in his career and was generally ridden by Robert Vance.

Uncle Remus compiled an impressive record of 15 wins from just 28 starts. He was awarded the title of New Zealand Horse of the Year for the 1977/78 season.

As a two-year old colt he won two of his five starts: the Regency Handicap at Ellerslie (1400m) beating Misty Brae and the Kindergarten Handicap (1200m) at Te Rapa, Waikato beating Our Grey.

As a three-year old he had 13 wins including an unbroken sequence of 10 between October 1977 and February 1978. His wins included:

- Cambridge Breeders Plate (1200m) beating Heidelberg.
- Wellington Guineas (1600m) beating Crest Star and Top Quality.
- New Zealand 2000 Guineas (1600m) beating the brave front running Braless and Greek Magic.
- Canterbury Gold Cup (2000m), ridden by David Peake due to Vance being suspended, beating Crest Star and Judge Obadiah.
- Thames Valley Stakes (1600m) at Te Aroha beating the older horses Battle Eve and Good Lord.
- Avondale Guineas (2000m) beating Northfleet and Bahrain. Northfleet was relegated to 3rd.
- New Zealand Derby (2400m) beating Bahrain and Boom Vang.
- Wellington Stakes (1600m) beating Kindled and Bahrain.
- Wellington Derby (2400m) beating Disraeli, the subsequent Trentham Stakes winner with Toupet Royale 3rd.
- Rotorua Challenge Stakes (1900m) from Serendipper and Tamboura.

In his other three-year old races he was second in the Great Northern Guineas (1600m) behind the Hawke's Bay Guineas winner, Crest Star and third in the New Zealand International Stakes (2200m) behind La Mer and Carlaw when ridden by Tony Williams.

He returned to racing as a four-year old but only managed two second placings due to a larynx disfunction affecting his breathing. He ran his last races in March 1979.

== Stud career ==
Following his racing career he was reasonably successful at stud, but never sired a horse with anything like his own ability.

Uncle Remus was the sire of Miss Remus, the winner of the Listed McKell Cup (2400m, Sydney) and the 1989 Queen's Cup (Brisbane).

He was also the damsire of Cavallieri (Gaius - Beycheville) who won the 1991 New Zealand Derby and was third in the 1992 Australian Derby.

== See also ==
- Thoroughbred racing in New Zealand
