= The Phantom Chance =

New Zealand-bred Thoroughbred racehorse

- Sire: Noble Bijou
- Grandsire: Vaguely Noble
- Dam: The Fantasy
- Damsire: Gate Keeper
- Sex: Gelding
- Foaled: 3 November 1989
- Country: New Zealand
- Colour: Chestnut
- Breeder: A G, K J, M C & P R Dennis
- Owner: Wayne B Ballin
- Trainer: Colin Jillings
- Record: 44:11-3-4
- Earnings: $2,189,706

Major wins
- New Zealand Derby (1992); W S Cox Plate (1993); Turnbull Stakes (1993)
- Last updated on 3 July 2007

The Phantom Chance (foaled 3 November 1989) is a New Zealand Thoroughbred racehorse who won the New Zealand Derby in 1992 and Cox Plate in 1993, earning over $2 million in his 44-race career.

== Family ==
The Phantom Chance, a gelding by Noble Bijou out of The Fantasy, was a member of one of New Zealand's best-known Thoroughbred families bred by A.G (Tony), K.J. (Joe), M.C. (Martin), and P.R. (Ray) Dennis (the Dennis brothers). This family features a number of horses whose names begin with 'The', including:

- The Pixie (1968, Mellay - The Kurd): 1981 Broodmare of the Year (who produced The Twinkle and The Fantasy).
- The Fantasy (1974, Gate Keeper - The Pixie): 1994 Broodmare of the Year.
- The Twinkle (1975, Gate Keeper - The Pixie).
- The Dimple (1977, Noble Bijou - The Pixie) winner of 16 races. Dam of Irish Chance, winner of the 1999 Auckland Cup
- The Phantom (1985, Noble Bijou - The Fantasy, a full-brother to The Phantom Chance), winner of the 1990 Underwood Stakes and 1993 McKinnon Stakes.
- The Grin (1992, Grosvenor - The Dimple): winner of the 1996 Southland Guineas and 2003 Broodmare of the Year.
- The Jewel (1999, O'Reilly - The Grin): winner of 11 races including the 2002 New Zealand 1000 Guineas, New Zealand International Stakes, Doomben Roses as well as runner-up in the New Zealand 2000 Guineas, New Zealand Oaks and Queensland Oaks.
- The Glitzy One (2007, Flying Spur - The Jewel): winner of 8 races.
- The Chosen One (2015, Savabeel - The Glitzy One): winner of the 2019 Manawatu Classic (G3 2200m), Frank Packer Plate and Herbert Power Stakes and 2022 Thorndon Mile. Also 4th and 5th in the 2020 and 2021 Melbourne Cup

== Racing career ==
The Phantom Chance did not race at two and made a slow start to his three-year-old career, finishing third in his first two starts. But then he won eight races on end, six of them at stakes level, including the New Zealand Derby and the Group 1 Cambridge Stud International Stakes against the older horses to confirm his status as New Zealand's champion three-year-old for the season.

His New Zealand Derby win gave trainer Colin Jillings his fifth win in the race.

As a four-year-old the horse's great success continued not only in New Zealand but also across the Tasman. He started his Australian career with a narrow win in the Turnbull Stakes at Flemington. After a 3rd placing in the Caulfield Stakes behind Naturalism and The Phantom he went on to win the 1993 Cox Plate. Ridden by Robert Vance, he beat fellow New Zealander Solvit by a length and a half with Golden Sword 3rd.. He became the second New Zealand Derby winner in three years to win the Cox Plate (after Surfers Paradise).

On 28 November 1993, again ridden by Robert Vance, he placed 12th of 16 in the Japan Cup won by Legacy World. He was three places behind the Australian entrant, Naturalism.

He continued to race through to the age of 8, and occasionally experienced success in both New Zealand and Australia at stakes level. He wasn't the same horse as he was at three and four though, and as a result his record probably looks less impressive now than it should.

== See also ==
- Thoroughbred racing in New Zealand
