= Tarzino =

New Zealand-bred Thoroughbred racehorse

- Sire: Tavistock
- Dam: Zarzino
- Sex: Stallion
- Foaled: 29 September 2012
- Country: New Zealand
- Colour: Bay
- Owner: M G Price, C G Lawler, M Jurie, J G Bebedellis, C Price, G Bebedellis, J J McNicholas, G Alas, J P Bergin, R A & J E Ferguson Partnership Syndicate
- Record: 14-4-1-2
- Earnings: A$1,647,050

Major wins
- Victoria Derby (G1)(2015); Rosehill Guineas (G1)(2016)

Awards
- Australian Champion Three Year Old Colt/Gelding (2015/16)

Tarzino (foaled 29 September 2012) is a retired Thoroughbred racehorse and active sire bred in New Zealand and trained and raced in Australia. He won the Victoria Derby and Rosehill Guineas, both Group One races. He won over one and a half million dollars.

== Racing career ==
Tarzino first raced at Pakenham on 5 July 2015, finishing 3rd and winning $1400. After a trial, Tarzino had his first win on 27 August 2015, coming from 5th at the 400m mark to win by a head. Three weeks later, Tarzino stepped up to 1600 metres at Caulfield, coming from last for a "huge win".

On 10 October 2015, Tarzino contested the Group 1 Caulfield Guineas. Finishing 7th of 16, it was described as a, "huge run from this big long-strider threading through the field from well back." His next appearance was a 3rd in the Moonee Valley Vase, with jockey Craig Newitt saying, "He jumped and wanted to get rolling a bit in the first furlong but after we'd gone out of the straight, he just dropped the bridle. He got home super."

Entering the Group 1 Victoria Derby as a favourite, Tarzino won the race comfortably. Trainer Mick Price said, "At the top of the straight he was the one you wanted to be on but he was going to hit the front too early. It was a long way up the straight. I was looking for the post but he was too strong. He can go to the paddock. He'll be a grouse horse in the autumn."

Tarzino returned in February 2016, finishing 4th in the Autumn Stakes. Three weeks later, Tarzino finished 2nd in the Australian Guineas behind Palentino, but the decision was protested, with jockey Craig Newitt claiming interference with 600 metres remaining and again in the straight. The protest was dismissed, with stewards saying Tarzino had also rolled towards the opposing horse.

On 19 March, Tarzino had a "dominant win" in the Group 1 Rosehill Guineas. Newitt said, "He toyed with them today, all we were waiting on was a gap and when it came there was no stopping him." Price concluded, "He's just a really, really good horse. He never runs a bad race and when he gets the right conditions is very hard to beat." He then ran a 4th in the Australian Derby, starting as odds-on favourite, before being spelled.

Returning on 27 August 2016, Tarzino contested four Group 1 races over the next 6 weeks, failing to finish any better than 6th.

== Stud career ==
Tarzino was retired to stud after ligament injury was discovered that was thought to have affected his last campaign.

Tarzino has stood at Westbury Stud, Karaka and his stud fee has been:

- 2018 $15,000
- 2021 $12,000
- 2024 $20,000.

=== Notable progeny ===
c = colt, f = filly, g = gelding

Foaled	Name	Sex	Dam	Dam-sire	Major win(s)
2018	Gypsy Goddess	f	Invisible Coin (Aus)	Redoute's Choice (Aus)	Queensland Oaks
2018	Jungle Magnate	g	The Love Of Money (Aus)	Casino Prince (Aus)	South Australian Derby
2021	Willydoit	g	Willamettre (Aus)	More Than Ready (USA)	New Zealand Derby
2023	Proxima Dea	f	Invisible Coin (Aus)	Redoute's Choice (Aus)	Spring Champion Stakes, Crown Oaks

== Tarzino Trophy ==
In 2017, New Zealand's first Group 1 of the season, the Challenge Stakes, was renamed the Tarzino Trophy.
