= Ekraar =

American thoroughbred racehorse

- Sire: Red Ransom
- Grandsire: Roberto
- Dam: Sacahuista
- Damsire: Raja Baba
- Sex: Stallion
- Foaled: 1997
- Breeder: Peter Brant
- Owner: Godolphin
- Trainer: Marcus Tregoning
- Record: 25: 8-3-5-9
- Earnings: 167,718GBP; 331,275EUR; 17,500AED; 3,80,000HKD; 260,000USD

Major wins
- Gran Premio del Jockey Club (2003)
- Last updated on 2022-12-20

Ekraar (foaled February 13, 1997) is a retired American Thoroughbred racehorse.

== Racing career ==
Ekraar was sired by Red Ransom, who was standing stud in the United States at the time. His dam was Sacahuista, who won the 1987 Breeders' Cup Distaff race.

Ekraar made his debut at a maiden race held at the Newmarket Racecourse in England on July 6, 1999, of which he finished at second place behind Race Leader. From there, he won the 1999 Vintage Stakes. His next victory wouldn't come until the following year when he won 3 consecutive races, two of which were group races (Rose of Lancaster and Select).

For the 2001 season; Ekraar raced in Dubai, France, England, and Hong Kong. His only win was at a listed race at Doncaster Racecourse called the Troy Stakes. Ekraar came in second place at the Hong Kong Vase, after being beaten by Stay Gold who caught up to him despite a 10 horse length lead at one point.

Ekraar came within the top 5 of all races he ran in in 2002 but never could win. Ekraar only won his next victory at a handicap race on June 7, 2003, at Doncaster. Ekraar would win one more race at Newmarket before winning his final race, which was the 2003 Gran Premio del Jockey Club in Italy. After this race, Ekraar would retire from racing.

== Stud career ==
Ekraar is currently standing stud at Linwood Park in Australia. Ekraar sired Habibi, the winner of the 2013 New Zealand Derby.
