= 2024 New Zealand Derby =

The 2024 New Zealand Derby was a Group I horse race which was run at Ellerslie Racecourse in Auckland, New Zealand on Saturday 2 March 2024. It was the 149th running of the New Zealand Derby, and it was won by Orchestral.

== Details ==
Orchestral became the sixth New Zealand Derby winner for Roger James, who now trains in partnership with Robert Wellwood. His first win came in 1986 with Tidal Light, who he trained in partnership with Jim Gibbs, and he later won with Roysyn, Zonda, Hades and Silent Achiever. He now holds the record for the most victories in the modern-day New Zealand Derby, which was created when the New Zealand Derby (Riccarton) and Great Northern Derby were amalgamated in 1973.

Orchestral was ridden by Craig Grylls, who had previously won the Derby aboard Crown Prosecutor (2021) and Rocket Spade (2019).

Orchestral was bred by Barneswood Farm and is a daughter of the champion Waikato Stud stallion Savabeel.

Bought by James and Wellwood for $625,000 at the 2022 New Zealand Bloodstock National Yearling Sale at Karaka, Orchestral is raced by long-time stable clients Colin and Helen Litt.

Orchestral headed into the Derby as a dominant winner of all of her previous three races, including the Karaka Millions 3YO and the Avondale Guineas. She was rated a $1.30 favourite for the Derby, while none of her 16 rivals had odds in single figures.

Orchestral was slow to leave the starting gates and settled towards the rear of the field, but she swooped around the outside at the home turn and quickly took command in the straight. She powered clear in the final 200 metres, winning by three and three-quarter lengths – the largest winning margin since C'est La Guerre in 2008. The race was run in 2:26.79, which was the fourth-fastest time recorded in the race.

Orchestral became only the fifth filly to win the New Zealand Derby since 1983. Three of those – Tidal Light, Silent Achiever and Orchestral – have been trained by James.

== Race details ==
- Sponsor: Trackside
- Prize money: NZ$1,000,000
- Track: Good
- Number of runners: 17
- Winner's time: 2:26.79

== Full result ==
	Margin	Horse	Jockey	Trainer(s)	Odds
1		Orchestral	Craig Grylls	Roger James & Robert Wellwood	$1.30
2	3 3/4	Antrim Coast	Per-Anders Graberg	Stephen Marsh	$156.90
3	Short neck	Ascend The Throne	Opie Bosson	Mark Walker & Sam Bergerson	$11.60
4	2 3/4	Just As Sharp	Ryan Elliot	Team Rogerson	$12.70
5	3 1/2	Interlinked	Sam Weatherley	Trent Busuttin & Natalie Young	$13.20
6	3/4	What You Wish For	Joe Doyle	Mark Walker & Sam Bergerson	$44.50
7	1/2	High Country	Michael McNab	Tony Pike	$64.80
8	1/2	Tranzed	Kate Hercock	John Wheeler	$165.80
9	Nose	Monday Melody	Masa Hashizume	Lance O'Sullivan & Andrew Scott	$85.30
10	3 1/2	First Innings	Billy Jacobson	Andrew Forsman	$49.60
11	2	City Gold Ready	Lynsey Satherley	Tony Pike	$190.60
12	1 3/4	Perfectmanz	Kelly Myers	Shaun Phelan	$136.50
13	3	Solidify	Jonathan Riddell	Team Rogerson	$58.10
14	1	Mosinvader	Warren Kennedy	Lance O'Sullivan & Andrew Scott	$22.60
15	1	Renegade Rebel	Matthew Cameron	Cody Cole	$52.30
16	1 1/2	Sinhaman	Kozzi Asano	Stephen Marsh	$141.60
17	3	Anaroa	Lisa Allpress	Guy Lowry & Leah Zydenbos	$93.40

== Winner's details ==
Further details of the winner, Orchestral:

- Foaled: 26 October 2020
- Sire: Savabeel; Dam: Symphonic (by O'Reilly)
- Owner: C R & H J Litt
- Trainer: Roger James & Robert Wellwood
- Breeder: Barneswood Farm
- Starts: 8
- Wins: 5
- Seconds: 2
- Thirds: 0
- Earnings: $1,577,175

=== The road to the Derby ===
Early-season appearances prior to running in the Derby.

- Orchestral – 2nd Bonecrusher Stakes, 1st Karaka Million 3YO, 1st Avondale Guineas
- Antrim Coast – 5th Wellington Stakes, 11th Avondale Guineas
- Ascend The Throne – 1st Waikato Guineas, 4th Avondale Guineas
- Just As Sharp – 1st Trevor & Corallie Eagle Memorial, 5th Auckland Guineas, 8th Levin Classic, 3rd Karaka Million 3YO, 2nd Avondale Guineas
- Interlinked – 3rd Avondale Guineas
- What You Wish For – 3rd Waikato Guineas, 15th Avondale Guineas
- High Country – 2nd Gingernuts Salver, 5th Waikato Guineas, 6th Avondale Guineas
- Monday Melody – 10th Auckland Guineas, 6th Waikato Guineas, 8th Avondale Guineas
- First Innings – 8th Gingernuts Salver
- City Gold Ready – 5th Gingernuts Salver, 7th Waikato Guineas, 12th Avondale Guineas
- Perfectmanz – 4th Gingernuts Salver, 9th Waikato Guineas, 10th Avondale Guineas
- Solidify – 2nd Hawke's Bay Guineas, 5th Sarten Memorial, 8th New Zealand 2000 Guineas
- Mosinvader – 2nd Waikato Guineas, 5th Avondale Guineas
- Renegade Rebel – 1st Gingernuts Salver, 11th Waikato Guineas
- Sinhaman – 9th Auckland Guineas, 5th Levin Classic, 13th Waikato Guineas

=== Subsequent Group 1 wins ===
Subsequent wins at Group 1 level by runners in the 2024 New Zealand Derby.

- Orchestral – winner of the 2024 Vinery Stud Stakes

== See also ==
- Recent winners of major NZ 3 year old races
