= Probabeel =

Australian thoroughbred racehorse

- Sire: Savabeel
- Grandsire: Zabeel
- Dam: Far Fetched
- Damsire: Pins
- Sex: Mare
- Foaled: 6 November 2016
- Country: New Zealand
- Colour: Bay
- Breeder: Garry Chittick
- Owner: J & B Lindsay
- Trainer: Jamie Richards
- Record: 29: 13-8-0
- Earnings: A$4,358,978

Major wins
- Karaka Million 2YO (2019); Karaka Million 3YO (2020); Surround Stakes (2020); Bill Ritchie Handicap (2020); Epsom Handicap (2020); Geoffrey Bellmaine Stakes (2021, 2022); Futurity Stakes (2021); W W Cockram Stakes (2021); Caulfield Stakes (2021)

Awards
- New Zealand Horse of the Year (2020/21)

Probabeel (foaled 6 November 2016) is a multiple Group 1 winning New Zealand-bred thoroughbred racehorse.

== Background ==
Probabeel was born and bred at Waikato Stud in Matamata, New Zealand. Initially the stud intended to keep her for racing, however she was sold.

Probabeel was purchased by Brendan and Jo Lindsay, who own Cambridge Stud, for NZ$380,000.

== Racing career ==
Probabeel became the first horse in history to complete the Karaka Million 2YO and Karaka Million 3YO double. She was ridden in both wins by Opie Bosson.

After completing this double, she was successful on 29 February 2020 when ridden again by Bosson in the Group 1 Surround Stakes (1400m) at Randwick Racecourse. She beat Funstar and Xilong.

Probabeel next achieved victory as a 4-year-old in the Bill Ritchie Handicap and the Epsom Handicap, both at Randwick and ridden by Kerrin McEvoy. In the Bill Ritchie (Group 3) she beat Cuba and Brandenburg and in the Epsom Handicap (Group 1) she headed home Funstar and Riodini.

On 6 February 2021, she won the group 3 Lamaro's Sth Melbourne Geoffrey Bellmaine Stakes, carrying 60 kg over 1200m with Damian Lane aboard, beating Paul's Regret and Snapdancer.

On 20 February 2021, Probabeel achieved her third Group 1 victory when successful in the Futurity Stakes (1400m) at Caulfield, ridden by Damian Lane and beating Arcadia Queen and Mr Quickie.

On 28 August 2021, Damian Lane rode her to victory in the Group 3 W W Cockram Stakes at Caulfield (1200m) beating Chassis and Instant Celebrity.

On 9 October 2021, Probabeel, ridden by Brett Prebble, won the Caulfield Stakes over 2000m at Caulfield from Nonconformist and Zaaki.

She was placed 5th in the 2021 Cox Plate behind State Of Rest, Anamoe, Verry Elleegant, and Mo'unga.

Probabeel was named New Zealand Horse of the Year in 2020-21 with 29 votes, ahead of Avantage (14), Melody Belle (10), Aegon (3), and Amarelinha (1).

On 12 February 2022, Probabeel returned to racing for the first time since the Cox Plate and repeated her win in the Group 3 Geoffrey Bellmaine Stakes (1200m) at Caulfield in the hands of Brett Prebble. She reached the lead in the final stride to win by a nose over Flying Mascot and Mariamia.

After the race, it was revealed that she had suffered a career ending suspensory ligament injury and was retired from racing to Cambridge Stud as a broodmare.

== Stud career ==
In Probabeel's first season as a broodmare she was served by the stallion Almanzor and had a filly born 5 September 2023 named Azorbeel.

On 27 October 2024 Probabeel had a second foal, a filly by Snitzel.

== Pedigree ==
Pedigree of Probabeel (NZ) 2016
Sire Savabeel (AUS) 2001	Zabeel (NZ); 1986	Sir Tristram	Sir Ivor
Sire Savabeel (AUS) 2001	Zabeel (NZ); 1986	Sir Tristram	Isolt
Sire Savabeel (AUS) 2001	Zabeel (NZ); 1986	Lady Giselle	Nureyev
Sire Savabeel (AUS) 2001	Zabeel (NZ); 1986	Lady Giselle	Valdema
Sire Savabeel (AUS) 2001	Savannah Success (AUS); 1995	Success Express	Hold Your Peace
Sire Savabeel (AUS) 2001	Savannah Success (AUS); 1995	Success Express	Au Printemps
Sire Savabeel (AUS) 2001	Savannah Success (AUS); 1995	Alma Mater	Semipalatinsk
Sire Savabeel (AUS) 2001	Savannah Success (AUS); 1995	Alma Mater	Sweetie
Dam Far Fetched (NZ) 2010	Pins (AUS); 1996	Snippets	Lunchtime
Dam Far Fetched (NZ) 2010	Pins (AUS); 1996	Snippets	Easy Date
Dam Far Fetched (NZ) 2010	Pins (AUS); 1996	No Finer	Kaoru Star
Dam Far Fetched (NZ) 2010	Pins (AUS); 1996	No Finer	Humour
Dam Far Fetched (NZ) 2010	Beyond (NZ); 2002	Centaine	Century
Dam Far Fetched (NZ) 2010	Beyond (NZ); 2002	Centaine	Rainbeam
Dam Far Fetched (NZ) 2010	Beyond (NZ); 2002	Hyades	O’Reilly
Dam Far Fetched (NZ) 2010	Beyond (NZ); 2002	Hyades	Habania
