= New Zealand Thoroughbred Breeders Stakes =

- Class: Group I
- Location: Trentham, Ellerslie, Te Aroha or Te Rapa
- Inaugurated: 1971
- Race type: Thoroughbred – Flat racing

Race information
- Distance: 1,600 metres (8 furlongs)
- Surface: Turf
- Qualification: Three-year-old and over fillies & mares
- Weight: Weight for Age
- Purse: $600,000 (2026)

The New Zealand Thoroughbred Breeders Stakes a Group One horse race for fillies and mares held in April each year. It is run under weight for age conditions for fillies and mares.

The first edition of the race was held at Te Aroha on 27 February 1971 when Breathalyser, a three-year-old filly by Battle-Waggon won from Ajasco and Devante. The race attained Group Two status in 1979 and was elevated to Group One in 2002. The 50th edition of the race was held in 2021.

== Recent results ==
Year	Winner	Age	Sire	Dam	Jockey	Trainer(s)	Owner(s)	Time	Second	Third
2026 (Trentham)	She's A Dealer	4M	Ace High (Aus)	Say No More, by Pentire	George Rooke	Roger James & Robert Wellwood	Rich Hill Thoroughbreds Ltd, Mark Neill, Richard Kidd, Ian Hart & Peter Merton	1:36.00 (soft)	Special Sakura	Afternoon Siesta
2025 (Ellerslie)	Provence 57	5M	Savabeel (Aus)	Sombreuil (Aus)	Samatha Spratt	Stephen Marsh	T V Rider & Social Racing Ellerslie Winners Circle Syndicate	1:36.23 (soft)	Jaarffi 57	Legarto 57
2024 (Ellerslie)	Belclare 57	6M	Per Incanto	Miss Rhythmic, by O'Reilly	Samantha Spratt	Lisa Latta	D K Woodhouse, Rusties Syndicate & J Clark	1:34.71 (good)	Town Cryer 57	Blissful Belle 57
2023 (Pukekohe)	Belclare 57	5M	Per Incanto	Miss Rhythmic, by O'Reilly	Samantha Spratt	Lisa Latta	D K Woodhouse, O Smith, Rusties Syndicate & J Clark	1.35.08 (soft)	Skew Wiff 54.5	Our Alley Cat 57
2022 (Te Rapa)	Imperatriz (Aus) 55.5	3F	I Am Invincible (Aus)	Berimbau (Aus), by Shamardal (USA)	Opie Bosson	Mark Walker	Te Akau Invincible Empress Racing Partnership	1.35.44 (good)	Coventina Bay 58	Two Illicit 58
2021 (Te Rapa)	Avantage (Aus) 57	5M	Fastnet Rock (Aus)	Asavant (NZ), by Zabeel (NZ)	Danielle Johnson	Jamie Richards	Te Akau Avantage Syndicate	1:37.36 (heavy)	(Dead heat); Coventina Bay 57; Travelling Light 57	-
2019 (Te Aroha)	Nicoletta 57	5M	Savabeel (Aus)	Celtic Crown (USA), by Doneraile Court (USA)	Jake Bayliss	Murray Baker & Andrew Forsman	JML Bloodstock Ltd (Mgr Lib Petagna)	1:35.14 (good)	Supera 57	Luvaluva 57
2018 (Te Aroha)	Miss Wilson (Aus) 57	5M	Stratum (Aus)	Cierzo (NZ), by Centaine (Aus)	Vincent Colgan	John Bary	Chouxmaani Investments Ltd	1:35.06 (good)	Thee Auld Floozie 57	Nicoletta 57
2017 (Te Rapa)	Charmont (Aus) 57	5M	High Chaparral (Ire)	Martique (Aus), by Danehill (USA)	Matt Cameron	Murray Baker & Andrew Forsman	R A Emery	1:35.42 (soft)	Thee Auld Floozie 57	Mime 57
2016 (Te Aroha)	Perfect Fit 57	4M	Elusive City (USA)	Fayreform (NZ), by Tights (USA)	Michael Coleman	Ken & Bev Kelso	Haunui Bloodstock Limited, Provincial Club Limited, Garry Madill, Margaret Duncan and James Orton.	1:35.36 (soft)	Abidewithme 57	Soubrettes 57
2015	Diadme 57	6M	Savabeel (Aus)	Bling (NZ), by O'Reilly	Jonathan Riddell	Murray Baker & Andrew Forsman	Scott Richardson Bloodstock Limited	1:33.46 (good)	Sports Illustrated 57	Abidewithme 57
2014	Viadana 57	6M	Towkay (Aus)	Yeah Nah (NZ), by Kinjite	Craig Grylls	Lance Noble		1:34.18 (soft)	Recite 54.5	Chintz 57
2013	Xanadu 57	4M	Elusive City (USA)	Forest Dream (Aus), by Forest Grow (USA)	Michael Coleman	Ken & Bev Kelso		1:39.42 (soft)	Twilight Granita 54.5	Diadme 57

There was no race in 2020 due to COVID-19 restrictions.

== Previous winners ==
- 2012 Say No More
- 2011 Barinka
- 2010 Juice
- 2009 Dane Julia
- 2008 Special Mission
- 2007 Captivate
- 2006 Arlingtonboulevard
- 2005 Rockabubble
- 2004 Surprize Surprize
- 2003 Zirna
- 2002 Saint Cecile
- 2001 Saint Cecile
- 2000 Tall Poppy
- 1999 Aimee Jay
- 1998 Aimee Jay
- 1991 Waikiki
- 1990 Waikiki
- 1987 Trocane
- 1986 Dare
- 1979 Orchidra
- 1977 Tudor Light
- 1976 Tudor Light
- 1971 Breathalyser

== See also ==
- Awapuni Gold Cup
- Manawatu Sires Produce Stakes
- New Zealand Oaks
- New Zealand 2000 Guineas
- Thoroughbred racing in New Zealand
