= Karaka Million =

- Class: Restricted Listed
- Location: Ellerslie Racecourse; Auckland, New Zealand
- Race type: Thoroughbred - Flat racing
- Website: www.ellerslie.co.nz

Race information
- Distance: 1200m (2YO); 1600m (3YO)
- Surface: Turf
- Track: right-handed
- Qualification: Registered two-year-olds or three-year-olds, respectively
- Weight: Handicap
- Purse: $1,000,000 (2YO) $1,500,000 (3YO)

The Karaka Million refers to two major New Zealand horse races for young horses - the original Karaka Million for two-year-old (2YO) horses and the Karaka Million 3YO Classic that started in 2018. Held at Ellerslie Racecourse, they are among New Zealand's richest races.

The races are restricted to horses sold through the New Zealand Bloodstock Yearling Sales held at Karaka. The two races are held on the eve of the National Yearling Sales Series at Karaka.

== History ==
The 2YO race was run for the first time in 2008, replacing a similar race held at Te Rapa. Up to 2017, horses eligible for the Karaka Million could also be entered in an associated race, the Karaka Three Year Old Mile over 1600m (NZ$200,000), in the following year. However, from 2018 New Zealand Bloodstock introduced a second Karaka Million $1,000,000 race for three-year-olds.

Since 2018, the "Boys Get Paid" Facebook group have organized a large gathering of hundreds of members at the Karaka Million meeting with a punting syndicate delivering what are believed to be the largest bets on New Zealand races.

Whereas a usual New Zealand race meeting may start before 1 pm, have up to 10 races, and finish before 6 pm the Karaka Million race meeting is a twilight meeting. For example, 2023 had a six-race card:

- 4:09 pm - the Karaka Cup, 2200m open handicap for a stake of $120,000
- 4:48 pm - the Group 2 Westbury Classic, 1400m set weights + penalties for fillies and mares for $180,000
- 5:28 pm - the Group 3 Almanzor Trophy, 1200m 3YO set weight + penalties for $130,000
- 6:08 pm - the listed Karaka Million 2YO, 1200m set weight for $1,000,000
- 6:48 pm - the Group 3 Concorde Handicap, 1200m Open Handicap for $130,000
- 7:28 pm - the listed Karaka Million 3YO Classic, 1600m set weight for $1,000,000

In 2024 the Aotearoa Classic, a $1 million race over 1600m, was introduced for 4 year old horses.

In 2025 the Railway Stakes was moved from New Year's Day to the Karaka Million meeting.

== Karaka Million 2YO ==
These are the recent winners of the Karaka Million 2YO race:

Year	Winner	Sire	Dam	Dam sire	Karaka sale price	Jockey	Trainer(s)	Time	Second	Third
2026	Dream Roca 55	El Roca	Petrachor	Redwood	$75,000	Ben Thompson	Liam Birchley, Brisbane	1:12.01 (soft)	Magill 55	Torture 55
2025	La Dorada 55	Super Seth (Aus)	Gold Fever	Gold Rocks (Aus)	$190,000	Craig Williams	Mark Walker & Sam Bergerson	1:10.77 (soft)	Vega For Luck 57	Miss Ziggy 55
2024	Velocious 55	Written Tycoon	Parmalove	Snitzel	$190,000	James McDonald	Stephen Marsh	1:09.15 (good)	Damask Rose 55	Full Force 57
2023	Tokyo Tycoon 57	Satono Aladdin	All About The Coin	Starcraft	$125,000	Craig Zackey	Mark Walker	1:10.04 (good, Pukekohe)	Ethereal Star 55	Trobriand 57
2022	Dynastic 56.5	Almanzor	Meir	Volksraad	$360,000	Opie Bosson	Jamie Richards	1:09.60 (good)	Wolverine 54.5	Fellini 56.5
2021	On The Bubbles 56.5	Brazen Beau	More Bubbles	Sebring	$90,000	Johnathan Parkes	Jamie Richards	1:10.70 (good)	Sneaky Shark 56.5	Avonallo 56.5
2020	Cool Aza Beel 56.5	Savabeel	Cool 'N' Sassy	Testa Rossa	$150,000	Opie Bosson	Jamie Richards	1:10.57 (good)	Play That Song 54.5	Taroni 54.5
2019	Probabeel 54.5	Savabeel	Far Fetched	Pins	$380,000	Opie Bosson	Jamie Richards	1:09.90 (good)	Aotea Lad 56.5	Appellant 55
2018	Avantage 55	Fastnet Rock	Asavant	Zabeel	$210,000	Opie Bosson	Stephen Autridge & Jamie Richards	1:10.54 (good)	Al Hasa 56.5	Bocce 56.5
2017	Melody Belle 54.5	Commands	Meleka Belle	Iffraaj	$57,500	Opie Bosson	Stephen Autridge & Jamie Richards	1:10.95 (good)	Hasahalo 54.5	Felton Road 56.5
2016	Xiong Feng	Iffraaj	Stray	Tale of the Cat	$30,000	Danielle Johnson	Stephen McKee	1:09.68	Showmeya moneyhoney	Kingsman
2015	Hardline	Showcasing	Midnight Breaker	Housebuster	$130,000	Damian Browne	Liam Birchley, Brisbane	1:10.64	Selfie	Dal Cielo
2014	Vespa	Elusive City	Miss Avalon	Fantastic Light	$34,000	Mark Du Plessis	Johno Benner	1:12.07	Riding Shotgun	O'Marilyn
2013	Ruud Awakening	Bernardini	Dawn Almighty	Danehill	$90,000	Craig Williams	Stephen Marsh	1:09.77	Fantastic Honour	Touche
2012	Ockham's Razor	Any Suggestion	Shadow Ray	Groom Dancer (USA)	$170,000	Craig Williams	Anthony Freedman	1:10.66	Silk Pins	Warhorse
2011	Fort Lincoln	Charge Forward	Belle Toujours	Flying Spur (Aus)	$110,000	Jonathan Riddell	Lisa Latta	1:11.82	Antonio Lombardo	Planet Rock
2010	Sister Havana	General Nediym	Ultima Vita	Canny Lad (Aus)	$40,000	Stathi Katsidis	Liam Birchley, Brisbane	1:09.70	Icepin	Banchee
2009	The Heckler	Lucky Owners	Comedy Cafe	Rory's Jester (Aus)	$70,000	Michael Rodd	Murray & Bjorn Baker	1:10.58	Sarge In Charge	Bewitch
2008	Vincent Mangano	No Excuse Needed	Rationable	Housebuster (USA)	$80,000	Vinny Colgan	Peter McKay	1:11.25	Maureen Dorothy	Raid

Melody Belle was a $32 outsider when she won the 2017 edition.

Horses that have won the Karaka Million 2YO race and the Manawatu Sires Produce Stakes are:

- Avantage
- La Dorada
- Melody Belle
- On The Bubbles
- The Heckler

The victory by Cool Aza Beel in 2020 was the fourth consecutive win by Opie Bosson as a jockey in the Karaka Million 2YO race. He did not ride in the 2021 edition but was successful again in 2022 with Dynastic.

The 2022 victory of Dynastic was the sixth consecutive win by Jamie Richards as a trainer/co-trainer in the race.

== Karaka Million 3YO Classic ==
The following are the recent winners of the Karaka Million 3YO Classic raced over 1600m.

Year	Winner	Sire	Dam	Dam Sire	Karaka sale price	Jockey	Trainer(s)	Time	Second	Third
2026	Well Written 55	Written Tycoon	Mozzie Monster (Aus)	Sebring	$ 80,000	Matt Cartwright	Stephen Marsh	1:35.00 (soft)	He Who Dares 57	La Dorada 55
2025	Damask Rose 55	Savabeel	Sombreuil (Aus)	Flying Spur (Aus)	$200,000	Blake Shinn	Mark Walker & Sam Bergerson	1:36.49 (soft)	Tuxedo 57	Dealt With 57
2024	Orchestral	Savabeel	Symphonic (NZ)	O'Reilly	$625,000	James McDonald	Roger James & Robert Wellwood	1:33.31 (good)	Pendragon	Just As Sharp
2023	Prowess	Proisir	Donna Marie	Don Eduardo	$230,000	Warren Kennedy	Roger James and Robert Wellwood	1:35.34 (Pukekohe)	Wild Night	Desert Lightning
2022	Pin Me Up	Pins	Brampton Loco	O'Reilly	$270.000	Sam Weatherley	Jamie Richards	1:34.37	Tutukaka	Karman Line
2021	Aegon	Sacred Falls	Toss Up	Zabeel	$150,000	Leith Innes	Murray Baker & Andrew Forsman	1:33.78	Amarelinha	Montre Moi
2020	Probabeel	Savabeel	Far Fetched	Pins	$380,000	Opie Bosson	Jamie Richards	1:33.49	Conqueror	Hasstobegood
2019	Long Leaf	Fastnet Rock	Frustrating	Stravinsky	$750,000	James McDonald	David & Ben Hayes & Tom Dabernig	1:35.1	The Real Beel	Madison County
2018	Scott Base	Dalghar	Extra Celestial	Danehill Dancer	$ 70,000	Rosie Myers	Johno Benner & Hollie Wynyard	1:33.43	Embellish	Savvy Coup

The 2018 and 2022 Karaka Million 3YO winners Scott Base and Pin Me Up were $22.10 and $24.10 outsiders respectively.

In 2020 Probabeel became the first horse to have won both the Karaka Million 2YO and 3YO races, ridden in both races by Opie Bosson. Probabeel went on to win multiple Group races in Australia and was named New Zealand Horse of the Year in both the 2021 and 2022 seasons.

== Winners of the Karaka 3YO Mile ==
in the years prior to the establishment of the Karaka Million 3YO Classic, the meeting had a 1600m race for 3 year old horses for stake money of $200,000 (2010) to $250,000 (2017). The following are winners of that race:

- 2010 - Joey Massino
- 2011 - Banchee
- 2012 - Rock 'n' Pop
- 2013 - Choice Bro
- 2014 - Spellbinder
- 2015 - Volkstok'n'barrell
- 2016 - Raghu
- 2017 - Volpe Veloce

== Winners of the Karaka Cups (2014-2023) ==
For many years prior to the establishment of the Aotearoa Classic the Karaka Million meeting had 2200m races for older horses:

- the Karaka Stayers Cup from 2014 to 2017
- the Karaka Cup from 2018 to 2023.

The following are the winners of those events.

Year	Winner	Sire	Dam	Dam Sire	Jockey	Trainer(s)	Time	Second	Third
2023	Zee Falls 56	Sacred Falls	Zelitist	Zabeel	Damian Lane	Stephen Marsh	2:16.87 (Pukekohe)	Contemplation 54	Tutukaka 60
2022	Rapid Falls 54	Sacred Falls	Sitting On A Hill	City On A Hill	Leith Innes	Tony Pike	2:17.71	Notabadharada 54	Sagunto 54
2021	Tiptronic 60.5	O'Reilly	Tiptoes	Pins	Wiremu Pinn (A2)	Graham Richardson & Rogan Norvall	2:17.06	In A Twinkling 61	On The Rocks 54
2020	Dance Card 53	Savabeel	Dancing Attendance	Danehill Dancer	Michael Dee	Lance Noble	2:17.84	Intrigue 53.5	Church Road 53
2019	Five to Midnight 60	Domesday	Fastnet Lady	Fastnet Rock	Johnathan Parkes	Lisa Latta	2:18.51	Mongolian Marshal 56.5	Sacred Day 53
2018	August Edition 54	Alamosa	Miranda Miss	Reset	Rosie Myers	Shaun & Emma Clotworthy	2:17.75	Top Prospect 54	Charles Road 59.5
2017	Chenille 55	Pentire	Charmed (NZ)	O'Reilly	Leith Innes	Tony Pike	2:16.81 (good)	Sacred Shot 53	Team Pete 51
2016	Rose of Virginia 53	Thorn Park (Aus)	Centapin	Pins (Aus)	Cameron Lammas	Lance Noble	2:17.00 (good)	Seventeen Seventy 53	Decorah 60
2015	Candle In The Wind 56	Darci Brahma	Prefer Blondes (USA)	Gentlemen (Arg)	Hugh Bowman	Donna & Dean Logan	2:18.07 (good)	Blizzard 56	Chipandchase 53
2014	Deane Martin 54	Keeper (Aus)	Ela Nimue	Zabeel	Tommy Berry	Bruce Wallace	2:17.06 (good)	Lion Red 53.5	Her To Eternity 53

August Edition, the 2018 winner of the Karaka Cup was a $30.60 outsider.

== See also ==
- Auckland Cup
- Aotearoa Classic
- Levin Classic
- Manawatu Sires Produce Stakes
- New Zealand 1000 Guineas
- New Zealand 2000 Guineas
- New Zealand Derby
- New Zealand Oaks
- Railway Stakes
- New Zealand Racing Hall of Fame
- Thoroughbred racing in New Zealand
