= Orchestral (horse) =

New Zealand-bred Thoroughbred racehorse

- Sire: Savabeel
- Grandsire: Zabeel
- Dam: Symphonic
- Damsire: O'Reilly
- Sex: Filly
- Foaled: 26 October 2020
- Country: New Zealand
- Colour: Bay
- Breeder: Barneswood Farm Ltd
- Owner: Colin & Helen Litt
- Trainer: Roger James & Robert Wellwood
- Record: 18:7-2-2
- Earnings: NZ$2,741,319

Major wins
- New Zealand Derby (2024); Vinery Stud Stakes (2024); Karaka Millions 3YO (2024); Avondale Guineas (2024); Aotearoa Classic (2025)

Orchestral (foaled 26 October 2020) is a retired New Zealand racehorse and one of only five fillies to win the New Zealand Derby since 1982.

== Background ==
Orchestral was bred by Barneswood Farm and is a daughter of the champion Waikato Stud stallion Savabeel.

Bought by trainers Roger James and Robert Wellwood for $625,000 at the 2022 New Zealand Bloodstock National Yearling Sale at Karaka, Orchestral is raced by long-time stable clients Colin and Helen Litt.

== Racing career ==
Orchestral began her career as an autumn two-year-old, lining up for her debut in a two-year-old fillies' race at Avondale in late April. She produced a strong finish for second, just ahead of another filly who would go on to win at Group One level as a three-year-old - Molly Bloom.

Orchestral won at Hastings in her only other two-year-old start, then returned there for her three-year-old debut but finished outside the placings in the Group Three Gold Trail Stakes.

James and Wellwood put the filly aside until December, when she returned to action with a close second in the Group Three Bonecrusher Stakes.

She would go on to win all of her next four starts in succession, including dominant victories in the Karaka Million 3YO Classic, the Group Two Avondale Guineas and the Group One New Zealand Derby.

Orchestral was sent out as an overwhelming favourite for the Derby at $1.30. She lived up to those high expectations with a dominant performance, recording the largest winning margin since C'est La Guerre in 2008.

Ridden by Craig Grylls, Orchestral was slow to leave the starting gates and settled towards the rear of the field, but she swooped around the outside at the home turn and quickly took command in the straight. She powered clear in the final 200 metres, winning by three and three-quarter lengths.

Orchestral became the sixth Derby winner for James, which is the most for any trainer since the Great Northern Derby and New Zealand Derby (Riccarton) were amalgamated to form the modern-day New Zealand Derby in 1973.

On 30 March 2024, Orchestral scored her second Group One victory when she won the Vinery Stud Stakes in her first appearance in Australia. She followed that up with a third placing in the Australian Oaks behind Autumn Angel and Zardozi.

In January 2025 Orchestral also won the listed Aotearoa Classic on Karaka Million night beating Mary Shan and Mosinvader. She then placed 3rd in the Otaki-Maori Weight for Age behind El Vencedor and Qali Al Farrasha.

In December 2025 Orchestral's trainers retired her from racing after she suffered an atrial fibrillation in the Dunstan Breeders Stakes at Pukekohe.

== See also ==
- 2024 New Zealand Derby
