= Aotearoa Classic =

- Class: Group 3
- Location: Ellerslie Racecourse
- Inaugurated: 2024
- Race type: Thoroughbred – Flat racing

Race information
- Distance: 1,600 metres (8 furlongs)
- Surface: Turf
- Qualification: Four-year-old horses
- Weight: Set weights (57.5kg for male horses, 55.5kg for female)
- Purse: $1,040,000 (2026)

The Aotearoa Classic is a Group three horse race for four year old horses held on Karaka Million night in late January each year at Ellerslie Racecourse, Auckland, New Zealand. The Karaka Million race night is held on the eve of the National Yearling Sales Series at Karaka.

== History ==
The first edition of the race was held Saturday 27 January 2024 when Desert Lightning won from Legarto and Rudyard. The 2025 edition was a listed race and it attained Group Three status in 2026. It was reported that the 2026 Aotearoa Classic was the highest race for turnover in New Zealand for January with $1.2 million bet on it via the New Zealand TAB and it's betcha app.

== Recent results ==
Year	Stake	Winner	Sire	Dam	Jockey	Trainer(s)	Time	Second	Third
2026	$1,040,000	Tuxedo 57.5	Tivaci (Aus)	Ball Gown	Opie Bosson	Shaune Ritchie & Colm Murray	1:36.06 (soft)	Hinekaha 55.5	Knobelas 55.5
2025	$1,000,000	Orchestral 55.5	Savabeel	Symphonic	Craig Grylls	Roger James & Robert Wellwood	1:35.99 (soft)	Mary Shan 55.5	Mosinvader 57.5
2024	$1,000,000	Desert Lightning 57.5	Pride of Dubhai (Aus)	Isstoora (Aus)	Vincent Colgan	Peter & Dawn Williams	1:32.53 (good)	Legarto 55.5	Rudyard 57.5

== See also ==
- Bonecrusher New Zealand Stakes
- Otaki-Maori Weight for Age
- Thorndon Mile
- Zabeel Classic
- Thoroughbred racing in New Zealand
