= McGinty (horse) =

New Zealand thoroughbred racehorse

- Sire: One Pound Sterling (GB)
- Grandsire: Sovereign Path (Gb)
- Dam: Ernader
- Damsire: Serenader II (Ire)
- Sex: Stallion
- Foaled: 16 September 1979
- Died: 6 June 2001
- Country: New Zealand
- Colour: McGinty Partnership (Keith Haub, Barney McCahill)
- Breeder: Les Jarvis, Mrs Hilda, J D & R N Fraser
- Trainer: Colin Jillings
- Jockey: Robert Vance
- Record: 26: 14-4-3
- Earnings: $527,621.00

McGinty, known in Australia as Mr McGinty, was a Group 1 winning New Zealand bred and trained race-horse and sire.

== Racing career ==
The son of One Pound Sterling was the winner of six Group One races and a total of 14 races. He was trained by Colin Jillings at Takanini for race commentator Keith Haub and co-owner Barney McCahill. He was usually ridden by Robert Vance.

McGinty was outstanding as a young horse and had six wins and a second from seven starts as a 2-year old horse and four wins and two places from eight starts as a 3-year old. He was the top-weighted horse on the NZ 1981-82 Two-Year-Old Free Handicap and was top colt on the 1982-83 NZ Three Year Old Free Handicap. His Group One wins came in the Air New Zealand Stakes (twice), Rawson Stakes, Canterbury Guineas, Caulfield Stakes and George Adams Handicap.

His standout moment was when he beat the champion Australian 2YO Marscay in the Todman Slipper Trial who went on to win the Golden Slipper and was subsequently crowned Australia's Champion 2YO. McGinty won this race running on 3 legs, having cracked his cannon bone at the top of the straight, and two missing front shoes.

When McGinty won the 1983 WRC George Adams Handicap in a winning time 1:32.99, this was the first time the 1:33 mile mark was broken in New Zealand.

=== Notable race results ===
Placing	Date	Race	1st	2nd	3rd	Jockey
1st	October 1981	Sapling Stakes (880m)	McGinty	Village Kid	Tigertron	Robert Vance
1st	December 1981	Avondale Stakes (1200m)	McGinty	Calere	Long Range	Robert Vance
1st	January 1982	Great Northern Foal Stakes (1200m)	McGinty	Andretti	Long Range	Robert Vance
2nd	March 1982	Eclipse Stakes (1200m)	Andretti	McGinty	Beautiful Smidgen	Robert Vance
1st	March 1982	Todman Slipper Trial (1200m)	McGinty	Marscay	Duke Diamond	Robert Vance
6th	January 1983	Railway Stakes (1200m)	So Dandy	Our Shah	Pia Roona	Lance O'Sullivan
1st	January 1983	Wellington Stakes (1600m) for 3YOs, Trentham	McGinty	Bight Plume	Glamour Star	Robert Vance
1st	January 1983	WRC George Adams Handicap (1600m)	McGinty	Ringtrue	Jon	Jim Cassidy
1st	February 1983	Air New Zealand Stakes (2000m)	McGinty	Bellerephon	Maurita	Robert Vance
1st	March 1983	Canterbury Guineas (1900m)	McGinty	Veloso	Baron Cayne & Chiamare (dead-heat)	Robert Vance
2nd	March 1983	Rosehill Guineas (2000m)	Strawberry Road	McGinty	Veloso	Robert Vance
3rd	March 1983	Tancred Stakes (2400m), Rosehill	Trissaro	Veloso	McGinty	Robert Vance
7th	April 1983	AJC Derby (2400m)	Strawberry Road	Veloso		Robert Vance
2nd	September 1983	George Main Stakes (1600m)	Emancipation 54.5kg	McGinty 57kg	Rare Form 58.5kg	Robert Vance
1st	October 1983	Caulfield Stakes (2000m)	McGinty	Cossack Prince	Cool River	Robert Vance
3rd	October 1983	Cox Plate	Strawberry Road	Kiwi Slave	McGinty	Robert Vance
2nd	November 1983	Queen Elizabeth Stakes (VRC) (2500m)	Fountaincourt	McGinty	Mr Jazz	Robert Vance
5th	November 1983	Japan Cup (2400m)	Stanerra	Kyoei Promise		Robert Vance
4th	February 1984	Waikato Sprint (1400m)	Abit Leica	Final Affair	Ebony Belle	Robert Vance
1st	February 1984	Air New Zealand Stakes (2000m)	McGinty	Silver Row	Isle of Man	Robert Vance
3rd	March 1984	Chipping Norton Stakes (1600m)	Emancipation 55.5kg	Trissaro 57.5kg	McGinty 57kg	Robert Vance
1st	March 1984	Rawson Stakes (2000m)	McGinty	Trissaro	Admiral Lincoln	Robert Vance

His final race was a 12th out of 14 runners in the 1984 Tancred Stakes behind Hayai at Rosehill on 14 April 1984.

== Stud career ==
McGinty began stud duties in 1984 and sired six Group One winners.

Notable offspring included:

- Jolly Old Mac, winner of the 1992 Australian Guineas.
- Marconee, winner of the 1995 Enerco Stakes
- Miltak, winner of the 1994 Auckland Cup and BMW Stakes.
- The Gentry, winner of the 1988 New Zealand Derby and 1989 New Zealand Stakes.
- The Hind, winner of the 1998 Adelaide Cup.

On 6 June 2001 McGinty died from a heart attack at Progressive Farms in Karaka at the age of 21.

== See also ==
Thoroughbred racing in New Zealand
