= Sacred Falls =

New Zealand bred Thoroughbred racehorse and stud sire

- Sire: O'Reilly
- Grandsire: Centaine
- Dam: Iguazu's Girl
- Damsire: Redoute's Choice
- Sex: Stallion
- Foaled: 27 August 2009
- Died: 1 December 2019 (aged 10)
- Country: New Zealand
- Colour: Bay
- Breeder: Waikato Stud
- Owner: Raffles Thoroughbred Racing Syndicate (Mgr: Kyan Yap), Dato' K S Yap & G J Chittick
- Trainer: Tony Pike & Mark Donoghue (2012); Chris Waller (2013-2015)
- Record: 22: 9-2-1
- Earnings: AU$4,660,237

Major wins
- Hawke's Bay Guineas (2012); New Zealand 2000 Guineas (2012); Doncaster Handicap (2013, 2014); George Main Stakes (2014)

Sacred Falls (27 August 2009 – 1 December 2019) was a champion New Zealand Thoroughbred racehorse and sire.

He was sold at the New Zealand Bloodstock Yearling Sales in 2011 for $160,000.

== Racing career ==
He began his career with Tony Pike and Mark Donoghue where he won his first six starts, including the Hawke's Bay Guineas and New Zealand 2000 Guineas. Following this he was transferred to Chris Waller in Sydney, Australia, where he finished second behind Dundeel in the Rosehill Guineas before winning the Doncaster Handicap in both 2013 and 2014. His first victory of the 2014–2015 season came in the George Main Stakes.

== Stud career ==
After Sacred Falls retired from racing he stood at Waikato Stud.

Sacred Falls died from liver disease at an equine hospital in Matamata on 1 December 2019.

=== Notable progeny ===
Sacred Falls has currently sired 2 individual Group 1 winners: Icebath and Aegon.

c = colt, f = filly, g = gelding

Foaled	Name	Sex	Dam	Dam sire	Major wins
2016	Icebath	f	Fabulist	Savabeel	2022 Empire Rose Stakes (G1)
2017	Aegon	g	Toss Up	Zabeel	2022 Moonga Stakes (G2); 2021 Hobartville Stakes (G2); 2021 Karaka Million 3YO Classic; 2020 New Zealand 2000 Guineas (G1); 2020 Hawke's Bay Guineas

== See also ==
- Thoroughbred racing in New Zealand
