= Hades (horse) =

New Zealand-bred Thoroughbred racehorse

- Sire: Zabeel
- Grandsire: Sir Tristram
- Dam: Annas Choice
- Damsire: Vice Regal
- Sex: Gelding
- Foaled: 7 November 1996
- Country: New Zealand
- Colour: Bay
- Breeder: Mrs J M Campin
- Owner: Mrs F E & R A Dixon
- Trainer: Roger James
- Record: 7:2-4-1
- Earnings: $355,127

Major wins
- New Zealand Derby (2000)
- Last updated on July 3, 2007

Hades (foaled 7 November 1996) also known as Helene Vitality is a Thoroughbred racehorse who, when he won the New Zealand Derby in 1999, gave trainer Roger James his third Derby win in five years.

He had only won 1 race going into the Derby, a maiden race at Awapuni at his first start, but had run well in strong company since including a second-placing in the Avondale Guineas.

Following his Derby win he travelled to Australia and finished a good third in the Group 1 Cadbury Guineas behind Pins and Freemason before being sold to Hong Kong. He raced for the remainder of his career as Helene Vitality, winning HK$12,696,550 in 38 starts there.
