= Railings (horse) =

Australian-bred Thoroughbred racehorse

- Sire: Zabeel (NZ)
- Grandsire: Sir Tristram (IRE)
- Dam: La Suffragette (NZ)
- Damsire: Palace Music (USA)
- Sex: Gelding
- Foaled: 25 September 2001
- Country: Australia
- Colour: Bay
- Breeder: Haunui Farm (AUS)
- Owner: G G Ltd, Sir Owen Glenn, T Pistikakis, M Lam King Poy
- Trainer: John Hawkes; Roger James; Michael Moroney
- Record: 42:7-4-3
- Earnings: A3,172,110

Major wins
- Colin Stephen Quality Handicap (2005); The Metropolitan (2005); Caulfield Cup (2005)
- Last updated on 17 October 2017

Railings is a retired Australian Thoroughbred racehorse who is most notable for winning the 2005 Caulfield Cup when trained by John Hawkes.

He was later transferred to New Zealand trainer Roger James in the Spring of 2007 and finished his racing career under trainer Michael Moroney.

Railings retired from racing in December 2008 and started a career in show jumping and dressage events.
