= Legarto =

New Zealand thoroughbred racehorse

- Sire: Proisir (Aus)
- Grandsire: Choisir (Aus)
- Dam: Geordie Girl (NZ)
- Damsire: Towkay
- Sex: Mare
- Foaled: 15 November 2019
- Country: New Zealand
- Colour: Bay
- Breeder: Warwick Jeffries, Oropi
- Owner: Mrs C J & P H Brown, A C & Mrs M E Enting, W J Foster, Mrs B J & K S Kelso, A M & Mrs P J Kirton, G & M Maloy & E J Verheyen
- Trainer: Ken & Beverley Kelso, Matamata

Major wins
- 2022 New Zealand 1000 Guineas; 2023 Australian Guineas; 2024 & 2025 Herbie Dyke Stakes; 2026 Bonecrusher New Zealand Stakes

Legarto (foaled 15 November 2019) is a New Zealand thoroughbred racehorse that has won multiple Group 1 level races in New Zealand and Australia.

She was bred by Warwick Jeffries and was sold at the 2021 Karaka bloodstock sales (Book 2) by Highline Thoroughbreds to Ancroft Stud for $90,000.

== Racing career ==
Legarto is trained by Ken & Beverley Kelso at Matamata. She won her first race on a Heavy 10 track at Matamata and went on to win another four races on end (three at Group level) before a 4th in the Karaka Million. Then in March 2023 she achieved a Group One victory across the Tasman in the Australian Guineas at Flemington.

In August 2024 she suffered a minor tendon injury during a trial win at Te Rapa and did not race until February 2025.

Throughout her career she has performed consistently against Open and Weight for Age company.

Notable performances by Legarto include:

Date	Placing	Race	Track	Jockey	1st	2nd	3rd
8/06/2022	1st	Murray's Swansong 1100m	Matamata	Taiki Yanagida	Legarto	Beyond Skies	Lili Marlene
30/09/22	1st	NZB "Ready to run" sale trainers series 3YO (1200m)	Te Rapa	Ryan Elliot	Legarto	Westwood	Val Di Zoldo
22/10/22	1st	Super Seth Soliliquoy Stakes (Group 3, 1400m)	Te Rapa	Ryan Elliot	Legarto	Romancing The Moon	Prowess
14/11/22	1st	New Zealand 1000 Guineas (Group 1, 1600m)	Riccarton	Ryan Elliot	Legarto	Best Seller	Blue Solitaire
26/12/22	1st	Eight Carat Classic (Group 2, 1600m)	Counties	Ryan Elliot	Legarto	Skew Wiff	Wessex
21/01/23	4th	Karaka Million 3YO Classic	Counties	Ryan Elliot	Prowess	Wild Night	Desert Lightning
4/03/23	1st	Australian Guineas (Group 1, 1600m)	Flemington	Michael Dee	Legarto	Attrition	Japanese Emperor
9/09/23	3rd	Tarzino Trophy (Group 1, 1400m)	Hastings	Ryan Elliot	Skew Wiff	Dragon Leap	Legarto
7/10/23	1st	Matamata Cup (Listed, 1600m)	Matamata	Ryan Elliot	Legarto	Aquacade	La Crique
4/11/23	10th	Golden Eagle (1500m)	Rosehill	Michael Dee	Obamburumai	Pericles	Golden Mile
14/01/24	1st	Aotearoa Classic Preview (Open, 1400m)	Ellerslie	Ryan Elliot	Legarto	Sacred Satono	Sharp 'N' Smart
27/01/24	2nd	Aotearoa Classic (1600m)	Ellerslie	Ryan Elliot	Desert Lightning	Legarto	Rudyard
10/02/24	1st	Herbie Dyke Stakes (Group 1, 2000m)	Te Rapa	Ryan Elliot	Legarto	Campionessa	One Bold Cat
9/03/24	2nd	Bonecrusher New Zealand Stakes (Group 1, 2000m)	Ellerslie	Ryan Elliot	El Vencedor	Legarto	Ladies Man
30/03/24	6th	Australian Cup (Group 1, 2000m)	Flemington	Michael Dee	Cascadian	Pride Of Jenni	Atishu
15/02/25	1st	Lisa Chittick Champagne Stakes (Listed 1400m)	Matamata	Ryan Elliot	Legarto	Acquarello	My Lips Are Sealed
8/03/25	3rd	New Zealand Thoroughbred Breeders Stakes (Group 1, 1600m)	Ellerslie	Ryan Elliot	Provence	Jaarffi	Legarto
26/12/25	3rd	Zabeel Classic	Ellerslie	Ryan Elliot	Kingswood	Jaarffi	Legarto
7/2/26	1st	Herbie Dyke Stakes	Te Rapa	Opie Bosson	Legarto	Kingswood	The Odyssey
7/3/26	1st	Bonecrusher New Zealand Stakes	Ellerslie	Opie Bosson	Legarto	Waitak	Tuxedo

== See also ==
- Thoroughbred racing in New Zealand
