= Zonda (horse) =

New Zealand-bred Thoroughbred racehorse

- Sire: Zabeel
- Grandsire: Sir Tristram
- Dam: Gone With The Wind
- Damsire: Light Wind
- Sex: Gelding
- Foaled: 5 December 1994
- Country: New Zealand
- Colour: Bay
- Breeder: Mrs J M Wilding
- Owner: Hundalee Derby Syndicate
- Trainer: Roger James
- Record: 16:7-2-4
- Earnings: $1,043,120

Major wins
- New Zealand Derby (1997); Alister Clark Stakes(1998); King's Plate (2000); Zabeel Classic (2001)
- Last updated on 3 February 2024

Zonda (foaled 5 December 1994) is a retired New Zealand Thoroughbred racehorse who won the New Zealand Derby in 1997. His career faced unfortunate setbacks from injury. Despite this, many consider him one of New Zealand's top horses of the 1990s.

The son of Zabeel took three races to clear maidens, but followed that Paeroa win with four more wins in a row, including the Avondale Guineas, the Derby and a victory in the Group 2 Alister Clark Stakes at Moonee Valley in Melbourne.

He followed that Melbourne win up with a third-placing at Caulfield and second in the 1998 Cadbury Guineas behind Gold Guru, before finishing a disappointing fifth in the Rosehill Guineas behind Tie The Knot and Tycoon Lil. However, it became clear that he had suffered an injury in that race, and he wasn't seen again on the track for two and a half years.

Zonda returned to his very best to win the King's Plate (Group 3, 1600m) and the Oaks Stud Classic (Group 1, 2000m) at Ellerslie Racecourse in successive starts. However, he suffered yet another injury not long afterwards and was off the scene for another year, and was only seen on the track on two more occasions in his career.

His career was so injury-plagued that he was very rarely seen at his best on the track after his Derby victory. His trainer Roger James has described him as both the best horse he's trained and the most frustrating.

But it is his Derby win that sticks in the memory. It was clear before the field had even turned for home in the race what the result would be. After seemingly effortlessly cruising to the lead he produced a stunning burst of acceleration and left his rivals in his wake, with the final margin at the line being four and three-quarter lengths, a margin that no Derby winner has gone close to matching since.

== See also ==
- Thoroughbred racing in New Zealand
