= Proisir =

Australian-bred thoroughbred racehorse and stud stallion

- Sire: Choisir (Aus)
- Grandsire: Danehill Dancer (Ire)
- Dam: Prophet Jewel (Aus)
- Damsire: Encosta De Lago
- Sex: Stallion
- Foaled: 3 October 2009
- Country: Australia
- Colour: Brown
- Breeder: Tony Falcone
- Owner: A & M Falcone
- Trainer: (1) Gai Waterhouse (2) Peter & Paul Snowden
- Record: 7: 3-2-1
- Earnings: AU$475,230

Major wins
- Spring Stakes (2012)

Proisir (foaled 2009) is an Australian-bred Thoroughbred racehorse who won at Group 3 level at age 3 and has gone on to forge a successful career as a stud stallion in New Zealand.

== Racing career ==
Proisir's racing career included the following:

- 1st in the 2012 Spring Stakes (Group 3, 1600m, Newcastle) beating Trophies
- 2nd in the 2012 Spring Champion Stakes (Group 1, 2000m) behind It’s a Dundeel with Honorious 3rd
- 8th in the 2012 Cox Plate behind Ocean Park
- 3rd in the 2013 Hobartville Stakes (Group 2, 1400m) behind Pierro and Rebel Dane with It’s a Dundeel 4th
- 2nd in the 2013 Randwick Guineas (Group 1, 1600m) behind It’s a Dundeel with Tatra 3rd

== Stud career ==
Proisir stands at the Rich Hill Stud in the Waikato, New Zealand. He started his career with a relatively low fee of NZ$7,000 and $9,000 in his initial years.

The service fee had risen to $17,500 by the 2023 season as a result of a number of Group race successes by his progeny.

In 2025 the Challenge Stakes at Hawkes Bay, which was previously called the Tarzino Trophy, became the Proisir Plate following sponsorship by Rich Hill stud.

=== Notable progeny ===
c = colt, f = filly/mare, g = gelding

Foaled	Name	Sex	Dam	Damsire	Major wins / placings
2016	Levante	f	Island Doy	Doyoun (Ire)	2023 Otaki-Maori Weight for Age; 2023 Telegraph Handicap; 2022 BCD Group Sprint; 2022 Telegraph Handicap; 2021 Westbury Classic (Group 2 1400m)
2018	Dark Destroyer	g	All Can Party	All American	2022 Tarzino Trophy; 2022 Rough Habit Plate; 2022 Auckland Guineas (G2 1600m)
2019	Legarto	f	Geordie Girl	Towkay	2024 Herbie Dyke Stakes; 2023 Australian Guineas; 2022 Eight Carat Classic (G2 1600m); 2022 New Zealand 1000 Guineas
2019	Pier	g	La Vitesse	Darci Brahma	2022 New Zealand 2000 Guineas; 2022 Hawke's Bay Guineas
2019	Prowess	f	Donna Marie	Don Eduardo	2023 Crystal Mile (G2 1600m); 2023 Vinery Stud Stakes (G1 2000m); 2023 Bonecrusher New Zealand Stakes; 2023 Karaka Million 3YO Classic
2019	Waitak	g	Repo Bay	Shocking	2024 Railway Stakes (G1 1200m); 2025 Awapuni Gold Cup (G2 2100m); 2025 & 2026 Howden Insurance Mile (G1 1600m); 2025 & 2026 Livamol Classic (G1 2040m)

== See also ==
- Thoroughbred racing in New Zealand
