= New Zealand International Stakes =

- Class: Group I
- Location: Te Rapa Racecourse; Hamilton, New Zealand
- Inaugurated: 1970
- Race type: Thoroughbred - Flat racing

Race information
- Distance: 2000 m (10 furlongs)
- Surface: Turf
- Track: Left-handed
- Qualification: Three-year-olds and up
- Weight: Weight for Age

The International Stakes is a Thoroughbred horse race run at Te Rapa Racecourse in Hamilton in early February every year. The race is now run as the Herbie Dyke Stakes.

The 2010 running was sponsored by the connections of stallion Darci Brahma, after being sponsored for many years by Cambridge Stud and Whakanui Stud.

In the early years the Waikato Racing Club invited jockeys from overseas to ride in the race, that being the reason for the name, and in 1972 Lester Piggott rode Sailing Home to victory in the race. At that time it was run every two years; it became an annual event from 1978.

In 2017 the purse was increased to $400,000, making it the richest Weight for Age race in New Zealand.

The race is one of two Group 1 weight-for-age events run on the same day, the other being the 1400m Waikato Sprint. A Group 2 three year old race, the David and Karyn Ellis Fillies Classic, is also on the same raceday.

== Race results ==
Year	Stake	Winner	Sire	Dam	Jockey	Trainer(s)	Time	Second	Third
2026	$700,000	Legarto 57	Proisir	Geordie Girl	Opie Bosson	Ken & Beverley Kelso	2:02.17 (soft)	Kingswood 59	The Odyssey 59
2025	$700,000	El Vencedor 59	Shocking	Strictly Maternal	Rory Hutchings	Stephen Marsh	2:03.05 (good)	La Crique 57	Whangaehu 59
2024	$600,000	Legarto 57	Proisir	Geordie Girl	Ryan Elliot	Ken & Beverley Kelso	2:03.33 (good)	Campionessa 57	One Bold Cat 59
2023	$450,000	Sharp 'N' Smart 54	Redwood	Queen Margaret	Ryan Elliot	Team Rogerson	2:02.51	Campionessa 57	Wild Night 54
2022	$400,000	Coventina Bay 57	Shamexpress	Coventina	Craig Grylls	Robbie Patterson, New Plymouth	2:05.66	Vernanme 59	The Chosen One 59
2021	$400,000	Royal Performer 59	Medicean (GB)	Quadri (GB)	Jonathan Riddell	Jenny & Robert Vance, Ardmore	2:02.08	The Chosen One 59	On The Rocks 59
2020	$400,000	Tiptronic 59	O'Reilly	Tiptoes	Jason Waddell	Graham Richardson	2:01.28	True Enough 59	Rock On Wood 59
2019	$400,000	On The Rocks 59	Alamosa	Cold Shoulder	Jake Bayliss	Michael Moroney & Pam Gerard	2:03.24	Tiptronic 59	Elusive Treasure 59
2018	$400,000	Lizzie L'Amour 57	Zabeel	Sabia	Matt Cameron	Murray Baker & Andrew Forsman, Cambridge	2:04.75	Wildflower 57	Nicoletta 57
2017	$400,000	Volkstok'n'Barrell 59	Tavistock	Volkster	Vincent Colgan	Donna Logan & Chris Gibbs, Ruakaka	2:01.35	Saville Road 54	Authentic Paddy 59
2016	$300,000	Valley Girl 52	Mastercraftsman	Leigh Valley	Lisa Allpress	Donna Logan & Chris Gibbs, Ruakaka	2:03.74	Stolen Dance 57	Kawi 59
2015	$300,000	Soriano 57	Savabeel	Call Me Lily	Rory Hutchings	Graeme & Debbie Rogerson	2:01.45	Nashville 59	Fast Dragon 59
2014	$200,000	Costume 57	Savabeel	Disguised	Michael Coleman	Graeme & Debbie Rogerson	2:02.91	Shuka 59	The Solitaire 57
2013	$200,000	Sangster 59	Savabeel	Quinta Special	Opie Bosson	Trent Busuttin & Natalie Young	2:02.31	Dolmabache 57	Asavant 57
2012	$200,000	Shez Sinsational 57	Ekraar (US)	Original Sin	James McDonald	Allan Sharrock, New Plymouth	2:03.48	Hold It Harvey 59	Rock ‘n’ Pop 54
2011	$200,000	Red Ruler 59	Viking Ruler	Ransom Bay	Mark Du Plessis	John Sargent	2:01.54	Booming 59	Passchendaele 57
2010	$200,000	Veloce Bella 57	Volksraad	Wave To Lottie	Michael Coleman	Mark Brosnan	2:01.93	Tell A Tale 59	Passchendaele 57
2009	$200,000	MacO'Reilly 59	O'Reilly	Double Babu	Hayden Tinsley	David Haworth, Foxton	2:01.75	Tell A Tale 54	Veloce Bella 57
2008	$200,000	Mission Critical 54	Fantastic Light	Trick Taker	Michael Coleman	Michael Moroney & Paul Moroney, Matamata	2:02.10	Sir Slick 59	Ombré Rose 56.5
2007	$150,000	Sir Slick 59	Volksraad	Miss Opera	Opie Bosson	Graeme Nicholson	2:01.57	Sharvasti 56.5	Kingsinga 59
2006	$100,000	Snazzy 57	Danske	Ballini	Lisa Cropp		2:04.40	Tusker 55.5	Kerry O’Reilly 58
2005	$100,000	The Jewel 56.5	O'Reilly	The Grin	Leith Innes	Hec & Steve Anderton, Wingatui	2:02.96	Distinctly Secret 58	Lashed 56.5
2004	$100,000	Lashed 55.5	Encosta De Lago	Traffic Watch	Opie Bosson	Graeme Rogerson & Stephen Autridge	2:03.71	Penny Gem 55.5	Kaapstad Way 58
2003	$100,000	Greene Street 58	Zabeel	Shadyside	Robert Hannam		2:02.47	Deebee Belle 58	Vega Sicilia 56
2002	$100,000	Emerald Dream 56.5	Danehill	Theme Song	Scott Seamer		2:02.03	Hail 56	Durzetta 57
2001	$100,000	Giovana 55.5	Bluez Traveller	Tristaine	Peter Johnson		2:00.78	She's A Meanie 56	Bluebird The Word 56
2000	$100,000	Bluebird The Word 58	Bluebird	Antelliere	Michael Coleman	Frank & Craig Ritchie, Takanini	2:01.99	Integrate 56.5	Aerosmith 58
1999	$100,000	Aerosmith 58	Indian Ore	Luna Di Miele	Jim Collett		2:01.16	The Message 58	Fatal 58
1998	$100,000	Fayreform 55.5	Tights	Glamour Gold	Opie Bosson		2:00.77	Vialli 56	Bubble 58
1997	$100,000	Great Command 52	Marscay	Tisolde	Lance O'Sullivan	Michael Moroney, Matamata	2:02.65	Cuidado 58	Lord Majestic 58
1996	$100,000	Lord Majestic 58	Gaius	Balletia	Earl Harrison		2:02.34	Vialli 58	Silver Chalice 58
1995	$100,000	All In Fun 58	Alleged Dash	Bonnie's Delight	Jim Collett	T J McDonald, Stratford	2:05.93	Cuidado 58	Freequent 55.5
1994	$100,000	The Phantom 58	Noble Bijou	The Fantasy	Jim Walker	Noel Eales, Awapuni	2:01.95	Ligeiro 58	Gaytrice 56.5
1993	$100,000	The Phantom Chance 52	Noble Bijou	The Fantasy	Shane Udy	Colin Jillings & Richard Yuill	2:00.04	Lurk 58	Gaytrice 56.5
1992	$100,000	Captain Cook 52	Wham	Veneziana	Vanessa Liley	P Fitzgerald	1:58.80	Fun On The Run 56.5	On The Beach 55.5
1991	$100,000	Fun On The Run 56.5	Racing Is Fun	Frenichie	David Walsh	Noel Eales, Awapuni	2:01.69	Seraphic 56.5	Grey Invader 56.5
1990	Not Held								
1989	$97,600	Regal City 57	Licorice Stick	Gay City	Debbie Taylor		2:00.55	Horlicks 56.5	Westminster 57
1988	$97,600	Sounds Like Fun 55.5	Sound Reason	Aleda Jay	Michael Coleman		2:03.84	Derriana 56.5	Solstice 55.5
1987	$73,000	Abit Leica 58	Ashabit	Leica Lite	Greg Childs	W D Dymond	2:01.93	Precocious Lad 52	The Filbert 58
1986	$60,000	Bonecrusher 52	Pag-Asa	Imitation	Gary Stewart	Frank Ritchie	1:59.59	Eva Grace 56.5	Coronal 58
1985	$38,000	Commissionaire 58	So Vain	Summer Eve	David Walsh	Noel Eales, Awapuni	2:00.44	All Belles 56.5	The Filbert 57
1984	$28,000	Commissionaire 58	So Vain	Summer Eve	Jim Cassidy	Noel Eales, Awapuni	2:01.20	Fountaincourt 58	Ashala 55.5
1983	$25,025	Commissionaire 58	So Vain	Summer Eve	Jim Cassidy	Noel Eales, Awapuni	2:02.77	Bellerophon 55.5	Macloud 58
1982	$24,800	Bound To Honour 50.5	Balkan Knight	Honour Bound	Brian Andrews	W Sanders, Te Awamutu	2:06.1 (soft)	Isle Of Man 52.5	Chimbu 58
1981	$25,000	Speculation 57	Sucaryl	Capital Gain	Maurice Campbell	M R Campbell, Awapuni	2:03.5	Assessed 58	Northfleet 58
1980	$24,500	Solo's Dream 58	Silver Dream	Gold Fidelity	J W Walker	G Yakich, Dargaville	2:12.88 (soft)	Rare Commodity 58	Wren's Pride 57
1979	$22,500	Shivaree 57	Sharivari	Just A Lark	David Peake	Dave O’Sullivan, Matamata	2:06.7 (easy)	Regal Band 56.5	Oakvale 58
1978	$20,300	La Mer 55.5	Copenhagen II	La Balsa	Des Harris	Malcolm Smith	2:13.85 (2200m)	Carlaw 58	Uncle Remus 52
1976	$15,000	Oopik 58	St Puckle	Lady Venice	P Trotter	Dave O’Sullivan, Matamata	2:16.6 (2200m)	Black Rod 58	Vale 52
1974	$20,000	Battle Heights 58	Battle Waggon	Wuthering Heights	Brian Andrews	R F Douglas, Morrinsville	2:16.1 (2200m)	Pegs Pride 55.5	Fury's Order 52
1972		Sailing Home	Dogger Bank	Chocolate	Lester Piggott				
1970		Far Time			John Harris	John (Jock) Harris			

== See also ==
- Thoroughbred racing in New Zealand
- Zabeel Classic
- Bonecrusher New Zealand Stakes
- Otaki-Maori Weight for Age
- Waikato Sprint
