= Avantage =

Australian-bred Thoroughbred racehorse

- Sire: Fastnet Rock
- Grandsire: Danehill
- Dam: Asavant
- Damsire: Zabeel
- Sex: Mare
- Foaled: 27 September 2015
- Country: Australia
- Colour: Bay
- Breeder: W & K Calder
- Owner: Te Akau Avantage Syndicate
- Trainer: Jamie Richards
- Record: 28:16–6–2
- Earnings: NZ$2,166,001

Major wins
- Karaka Million (2018); Manawatu Sires Produce Stakes (2018); Birthday Card Stakes (2019); Telegraph Handicap (2020, 2021); Haunui Farm Classic (2020, 2021); Bonecrusher New Zealand Stakes (2020); Railway Stakes (2021); BCD Group Sprint (2021); New Zealand Thoroughbred Breeders Stakes (2021)

Avantage (foaled 27 September 2015) is an Australian-bred, New Zealand-trained Thoroughbred racehorse who has won nine Group 1 races.

Avantage was bred by Willie Calder and Karen N Calder. She was purchased by David Ellis at the 2017 National Yearling Sales Series for $210,000 from The Oaks Stud.

== Racing career ==
Avantage was raced by the Te Akau Avantage Syndicate, managed by Karen Fenton-Ellis. Her usual riders were Danielle Johnson and Opie Bosson.

In March 2019 Avantage won the Group 3 Birthday Card Stakes over 1200m at Rosehill and followed that with a third in the 1200m Group 2 Arrowfield 3YO Sprint behind Classique Legend and Jonker.

Later in September 2019 she raced twice more in Australian group company. She was 7th over 1400m at Randwick Racecourse and 8th over 1500m at Rosehill behind Kolding and Mister Sea Wolf respectively.

As well as her New Zealand Group wins she has also been placed second behind Melody Belle in the 2021 Bonecrusher New Zealand Stakes (2000m), 2020 Livamol Classic (2040m) and Windsor Park Plate (1600m).

Avantage was retired from racing on 17 September 2021 after suffering a tendon injury.

== Breeding career ==
Avantage was purchased for $4.1 million by Coolmore Stud via New Zealand Bloodstock’s online sale. The purchase established a new world record price for any horse sold online.

In her first year she was serviced by stallion Wootton Basset and produced Avantaggia who won her first race, on her second race-day start, at Te Atoha in October 2025.

Her first 3 foals sold for over A$1M.

== Pedigree ==
Pedigree of Avantage (AUS) 2015
Sire Fastnet Rock (AUS) 2001	Danehill (USA); 1986	Danzig	Northern Dancer
Sire Fastnet Rock (AUS) 2001	Danehill (USA); 1986	Danzig	Pas De Nom
Sire Fastnet Rock (AUS) 2001	Danehill (USA); 1986	Razyana	His Majesty
Sire Fastnet Rock (AUS) 2001	Danehill (USA); 1986	Razyana	Spring Adieu
Sire Fastnet Rock (AUS) 2001	Piccadilly Circus (AUS); 1995	Royal Academy	Nijinsky
Sire Fastnet Rock (AUS) 2001	Piccadilly Circus (AUS); 1995	Royal Academy	Crimson Saint
Sire Fastnet Rock (AUS) 2001	Piccadilly Circus (AUS); 1995	Gatana	Marauding
Sire Fastnet Rock (AUS) 2001	Piccadilly Circus (AUS); 1995	Gatana	Twigalae
Dam Asavant (NZ) 2008	Zabeel (NZ); 1986	Sir Tristram	Sir Ivor
Dam Asavant (NZ) 2008	Zabeel (NZ); 1986	Sir Tristram	Isolt
Dam Asavant (NZ) 2008	Zabeel (NZ); 1986	Lady Giselle	Nureyev
Dam Asavant (NZ) 2008	Zabeel (NZ); 1986	Lady Giselle	Valderna
Dam Asavant (NZ) 2008	Pins 'N' Needles (NZ); 2001	Pins	Snippets
Dam Asavant (NZ) 2008	Pins 'N' Needles (NZ); 2001	Pins	No Finer
Dam Asavant (NZ) 2008	Pins 'N' Needles (NZ); 2001	Raining	Centaine
Dam Asavant (NZ) 2008	Pins 'N' Needles (NZ); 2001	Raining	Storm Force
