= Bonecrusher New Zealand Stakes =

New Zealand stakes
- Class: Group I
- Location: Ellerslie Racecourse
- Race type: Thoroughbred – Flat racing

Race information
- Distance: 2000 metres
- Surface: Turf
- Track: Right-handed
- Qualification: Open
- Weight: Weight-for-age

The New Zealand Stakes, currently run as the Bonecrusher New Zealand Stakes, is a Group One thoroughbred horse race in New Zealand.

It is run at Ellerslie Racecourse on Champions Day in March of every year, with a stake of $1 million.

== History ==
The New Zealand Stakes was introduced as a weight-for-age race in the 1974–75 New Zealand racing season.

It has been run under the following names depending on sponsors:

- Second Century Stakes (1975–1976)
- Air New Zealand Stakes (1977–1990)
- Television New Zealand Stakes (1994)
- Trackside Sales Stakes (1995–1996)
- Harrah's Stakes (1997)
- Lion Red Stakes (1999–2002)
- Asian Racing Federation Stakes (2003)
- Darley Stakes (2005)
- Starcraft New Zealand Stakes (2006–2007)
- First Sovereign Trust New Zealand Stakes (2008)
- Sky City New Zealand Stakes (2009–2010)
- Nicolas Feuillatte Stakes (2011)
- Lindauer New Zealand Stakes (2012–2014)
- Ronald McDonald House Charities New Zealand Stakes (2015)
- Bonecrusher New Zealand Stakes (2016–present)

== Race results ==
The following are the results of the Bonecrusher New Zealand Stakes:

Year	Winner	Sire	Dam	Jockey	Trainer(s)	Time	Second	Third
2026	Legarto 57	Proisir	Geordie Girl	Opie Bosson	Ken & Bev Kelso	2:03.77 (soft)	Waitak 59	Tuxedo 59
2025	El Vencedor 59	Shocking	Strictly Maternal	Wiremu Pinn	Stephen Marsh	2:05.50 (soft)	La Crique 57	Qali Al Farrasha 57
2024	El Vencedor 59	Shocking	Strictly Material	Joe Doyle	Stephen Marsh	2:03.90 (good)	Legarto 57	Ladies Man 59
2023	Prowess 52	Proisir	Donna Marie	Michael McNab	Roger James & Robert Wellwood	2.06.53	Campionessa 57	La Crique 56.5
2022	Coventina Bay 57	Shamexpress	Coventina	Craig Grylls	Robbie Patterson	2:05.34	Vernanme 59	The Chosen One 59
2021	Melody Belle 57	Commands (AUS)	Meleka Belle (NZ)	Troy Harris	Jamie Richards, Matamata	2:03.03	Avantage 57	Tiptronic 57
2020	Avantage 57	Fastnet Rock (AUS)	Asavant (NZ)	Opie Bosson	Jamie Richards, Matamata	2:02.93	True Enough 59	Supera 57
2019	Melody Belle 57	Commands (AUS)	Meleka Belle (NZ)	Opie Bosson	Jamie Richards, Matamata	2:06.56	Danzdanzdance 57	Rondinella 57
2018	Saint Emilion 59	Mastercraftsman (IRE)	Roseario (NZ)	Leith Innes	Murray Baker & Andrew Forsman, Cambridge	2:02.47	Darscape Prince 57	Authentic Paddy 59
2017	Lizzie L'Amour 57	Zabeel (NZ)	Sabia (FRA)	Matt Cameron	Murray Baker & Andrew Forsman, Cambridge	2:03.64	Benzini 59	Sound Proposition 59
2016	Volkstok 'n'barrell 59	Tavistock (NZ)	Volkster (NZ)	Vincent Colgan	Donna Logan & Chris Gibbs, Ruakaka	2:01.83	Girl Of My Dreams 57	Consensus 57
2015	Sakhee's Soldier 59	Sakhee's Secret (GB)	Surreptitiously (GB)	Matt Cameron	Murray Baker & Andrew Forsman, Cambridge	2:06.03	Rising Romance 57	Farm Boy 59
2014	Silent Achiever 57	O'Reilly (NZ)	Winning Spree (NZ)	Vincent Colgan	Roger James, Cambridge	2:06.15	Historian 59	Fortune Knight 59
2013	Ocean Park 59	Thorn Park (AUS)	Sayyida (NZ)	Leith Innes	Gary Hennessy, Matamata	2:02.43	Veyron 59	Better Than Ever 59
2012	Scarlett Lady 57	Savabeel (AUS)	On Call (NZ)	James McDonald	Graeme & Debbie Rogerson, Tuhikaramea	2:05.28	Veyron 59	Hold It Harvey 59
2011	The Party Stand 57	Thorn Park (AUS)	Cremisi (AUS)	Opie Bosson	Roger James, Cambridge	2:04.47	Adaline 57	Vosne Romanee 59
2010	Vosne Romanee 59	Electronic Zone (USA)	Madison Avenue (NZ)	Opie Bosson	Jeff Lynds, Awapuni	2:01.63	Harris Tweed 59	Tell A Tale 59
2009	MacO'Reilly 59	O'Reilly (NZ)	Double Babu (NZ)	Hayden Tinsley	David Haworth, Foxton	2:05.01	Sir Slick 59	O’Reilly Rose 57
2008	Sir Slick 59	Volksraad (GB)	Miss Opera (NZ)	Bruce Herd	Graeme Nicholson & Paul Allbon, Te Aroha	2:02.49	Ombré Rose 56.5	Dezigna 59
2007	Gaze 56.5	Cape Cross (IRE)	Eye Full (NZ)	Mark Du Plessis	Roger James & Paul Mirabelli, Cambridge	2:04.85	Sir Slick 59	Dezigna 59
2006	Kristov 58	Slavic (USA)	Santa Barbra (NZ)	Hayden Tinsley	Phillip Stevens, Matamata	2:03.07	Hurrah 57	Shikoba 51
2005	Xcellent 52.5	Pentire (GB)	Excello (AUS)	Michael Coleman	Mike & Paul Moroney, Matamata	2:01.45 (Firm)	St Reims 58	Lashed 56.5
2004	Lashed 55.5	Encosta De Lago (AUS)	Traffic Watch (AUS)	Opie Bosson	Graeme Rogerson & Stephen Autridge	2:13.17 (Heavy)	Deebee Belle 56.5	Hail 58
2003	Deebee Belle 56.5	Bin Ajwaad (IRE)	Deebee Lady (NZ)	Andrew Calder	Pam & Tony Gillies, Matamata	2:07.31	Greene Street 56	El Duce 58
2002	Armstrong 58	Classic Fame (USA)	Lilting Star (AUS)	Bruce Herd	Jeff Lynds, Awapuni	2:07.78	Emerald Dream 58	Soap Opera 56
2001	Tall Poppy 56.5	Kaapstad (NZ)	Fun On The Run (NZ)	David Walsh	Noel Eales, Awapuni	2:04.25	Showella 56	Ngaio 56
2000	Showella 55.5	Lord Ballina (AUS)	Show Queen (NZ)	Eddie Wilkinson	Frank & Craig Ritchie, Takanini	2:04.32 (Firm)	Rebel 58	Rijeka 56.5
1999	The Message 58	Gold And Ivory (USA)	Miss Morrinsville (NZ)	Linda Ballantyne	John Ralph, Te Rapa	2:07.04	Montreal Star 58	Full Noise 58
1998	Fayreform 55.5	Tights (USA)	Glamour Gold (NZ)	Opie Bosson	Stephen Autridge, Matamata	2:02.40	Waitaha Rua 56	Bubble 58
1997	Magnet Bay 58	Gold And Ivory (USA)	Rivermist (NZ)	Vincent Colgan	Danny Frye, Rangiora	2:09.07	Interval 57	Via Suez 58
1996	Roysyn 52.5	Bakharoff (USA)	Royal Proposal (NZ)	Vincent Colgan	Roger James & Ron Taylor, Cambridge	2:06.86	Silver Challice 52	Lord Majestic 56
1995	Captain Court 58	Courthouse (NZ)	Brunhild (AUS)	Trudy Thornton	Vince Middeldorp, Avondale	2:08.18	Cuidado 58	Few Are Chosen (AUS) 58
1994	Solvit 58	Morcon (GB)	Yallah Sun (AUS)	David Walsh	Moira Murdoch, Pukekohe	2:02.58	Miltak 58	All Or Nothing 56
1993	Solvit 57	Morcon (GB)	Yallah Sun (AUS)	David Walsh	Moira Murdoch, Pukekohe	2:03.06	Whitford Hill 57	Kiss 56
1992	Lurestina 56.5	Sir Tristram (IRE)	Noelani (NZ)	Peter Tims	Dave & Paul O'Sullivan, Matamata	2:07.3	Cavallieri 56	Val D'Arno (USA) 52
1991	Surfers Paradise 52	Crested Wave (USA)	Lady Aythorpe (NZ)	Lance O'Sullivan	Dave & Paul O'Sullivan, Matamata	2:01.16	Seraphic 52	Grey Invader 56
1990	Riverina Charm 55.5	Sir Tristram (IRE)	Country Charm (IRE)	Tony Allan	Laurie Laxon, Cambridge	2:03.36	Castletown 56	Jondolar 52
1989	The Gentry 52	McGinty (NZ)	Rainfall (NZ)	Greg Childs	Ray & Kerry Verner, Takanini	2:06.10	Maurine 56.5	Poetic Prince 57
1988	Bonecrusher 58	Pag-Asa (AUS)	Imitation (NZ)	Gary Stewart	Frank Ritchie, Takanini	2:02.51	Horlicks 55.5	Sounds Like Fun 55.5
1987	Tidal Light 50.5	Diagrammatic (USA)	Azores (AUS)	Lance O'Sullivan	Jim Gibbs & Roger James	1:59.89	Solveig 56.5	Abit Leica 58
1986	Bonecrusher 52	Pag-Asa (AUS)	Imitation (NZ)	Gary Stewart	Frank Ritchie, Takanini	2:04	Hexagonal 54	The Thief 54
1985	The Filbert 57	Souvran (GB)	Fauxzann (NZ)	Gary Phillips	Don Couchman, Hawera	2:01.94	Silver Elm 55.5	Shifnal Prince 58
1984	McGinty 57	One Pound Sterling (GB)	Ernader (NZ)	Robert Vance	Colin Jillings, Takanini	2:01.65	Silver Row 56.5	Isle Of Man 58
1983	McGinty 52	One Pound Sterling (GB)	Ernader (NZ)	Robert Vance	Colin Jillings, Takanini	2:02.59	Bellerethon 55.5	Maurita 55.5
1982	Golden Rhapsody 58	Sharivari (USA)	Sound Of Music (NZ)	Chris McNab	Dave & Paul O'Sullivan & Michael Moroney, Matamata	2:03.39	Joyarty 56.6	Precious Son 58
1981	Pays Anne 55.5	Alvaro (GB)	Irenu (NZ)	Phillip Alderman	B Cameron, Tokoroa	2:02.56	Drum 58	Ring The Bell 52
1980	Arbre Chene 52	Oakville (GB)	Marja Jean (NZ)	Lester Piggott	Clive Bennett, Pukekohe	2:09.65	Blue Rula 56	Drum 57
1979	La Mer 56.5	Copenhagen II (GB)	La Balsa (NZ)	Des Harris	Malcolm Smith, New Plymouth	2:03.49	Shivaree 57	March Legend 58
1978	Serendiper 57	Serenader II (IRE)	Caressable (NZ)	Peter Johnson	Mrs WL Sullivan, Te Rapa	2:05.73	Good Lord 58	La Mer 55.5
1977	Balmerino 57	Trictrac (FR)	Dulcie (NZ)	Maurice Campbell	Brian Smith, Cambridge	2:02.74	Tudor Light 55.5	Battle Eve 56.5
1976	Black Rod 58	Oncidium (GB)	Precede (NZ)	Bill Skelton	Clem Bowry, Otaki	2:07.1	Oopik 58	Sharda 58
1975	Hi Bing 58	Just Whistle (IRE)	Derent (NZ)	Grenville Hughes	Trevor Knowles, Te Rapa	2:08.4	Kiwi Can 58	Jandell 55.5

== See also ==
- Auckland Cup
- Karaka Million
- New Zealand Derby
- New Zealand International/Herbie Dyke Stakes
- Sistema Stakes
- Zabeel Classic
- Thoroughbred racing in New Zealand
