= The Gentry =

New Zealand-bred Thoroughbred racehorse

- Sire: McGinty
- Grandsire: One Pound Sterling
- Dam: Rainfall
- Damsire: Le Filou
- Sex: Gelding
- Foaled: 1985
- Country: New Zealand
- Colour: Bay
- Owner: L W Davis & K Haub, Haunui Farm Ltd. & P J Walker
- Trainer: Kerry & Ray Verner
- Record: 21:6-1-1
- Earnings: $486,625

Major wins
- New Zealand Derby (1988) New Zealand Stakes (1989)
- Last updated on July 3, 2007

The Gentry is a Thoroughbred racehorse who won the New Zealand Derby in 1988.

Born in 1985, he is the only classic-winning son of the galloper McGinty who beat the best on both sides of the Tasman in his racing career should arguably have been the first New Zealand winner of the Golden Slipper.

The Gentry showed promise at two, taking out the Group 3 Eclipse Stakes, but then lost his form for the best part of a year and, with the exception of a class 3 win at Tauranga, failed to finish in the first three for nine months.

In late November, The Gentry won a three-year-old race at Ellerslie before finishing second to Low Tolerance in the Avondale Guineas. He subsequently defeated Low Tolerance to win the New Zealand Derby.[citation needed]

After his Derby win he went on to record another Group 1 win at the same track, beating the excellent mare Maurine and Poetic Prince over 2000m in the New Zealand Stakes, but was disappointing in a subsequent Australian campaign.
