= Warren Kennedy =

South African horse racing jockey (born 1980)

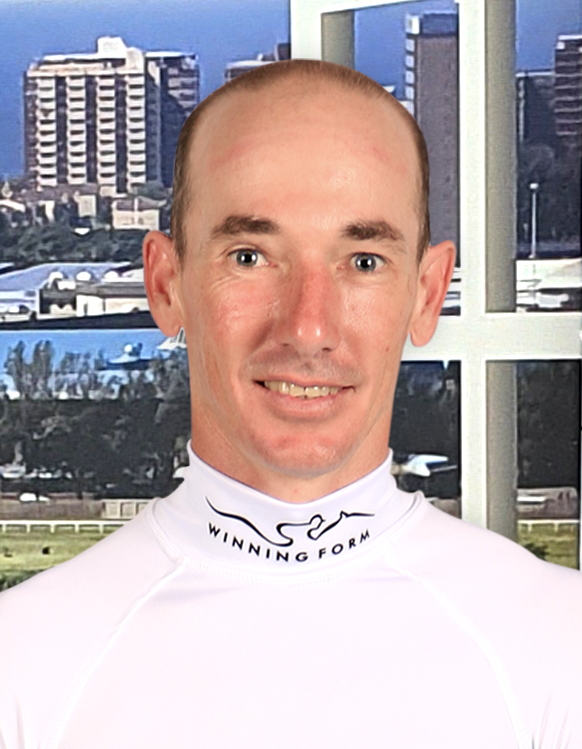

Personal information
- Born: 14 April 1980 (age 46) Durban, South Africa
- Occupation: Jockey

Horse racing career
- Sport: Horse racing

Major racing wins
- Thekwini Stakes (2019); SA Fillies Classic (2020); Gold Challenge (2020); Woolavington 2000 (2020); Allan Robertson Championship (2020); Summer Cup (2020); Empress Club Stakes (2021)

Significant horses
- Summer Pudding, Rainbow Bridge, Vernichey, Gabor
- Updated on 17 August 2020

Warren Brian Kennedy is a South African horse racing jockey currently riding in New Zealand. He was Champion Jockey in South Africa for the 2019/20 and 2021/22 seasons and in New Zealand for the 2023/24 season.

He has won Group 1 races in South Africa and in New Zealand.

== Riding career ==
Kennedy attended the South African Jockey Academy in 1995 when he was 14 years old. He became a qualified rider in 2000. Kennedy won the National Apprentice title in his final year.

His first race win came on board Coded Missile for trainer Nic Claasen at Fairview on 15 May 1998. It was a chance ride as the trainer's stable jockey fell ill. The race was the Lady Pedant Stakes, and being a listed race, Kennedy received no apprentice claim.

His first Grade 1 victory came on board Gabor in the Thekwini Stakes at Hollywoodbets Greyville. Other Group 1 wins include the Summer Cup with Summer Pudding, the Hollywoodbets Gold Challenge with Rainbow Bridge, and the Allan Robertson Championship with Vernichey. He also rode Triple Tiara winner Summer Pudding to victory in the Grade 1 SA Fillies Classic, the Grade 2 Wilgerbosdrift Gauteng Fillies Guineas, and the Grade 1 Woolavington 2000.

In 2022 Kennedy moved to New Zealand where he was engaged by Byerley Park founder and Director Daniel Nakhle and managed by former Gauteng-based jockey Donavan Mansour. Kennedy quickly achieved race day wins.

== Major New Zealand winning rides ==
- 2022 Zabeel Classic (G1) with Defibrillate for Graham Richardson and Rogan Norvall
- 2023 Karaka Million 3YO Classic (Listed 1600m) with Prowess for Roger James and Robert Wellwood.
- 2023 New Zealand 2000 Guineas (G1) with Crocetti for Danny Walker and Arron Tata
- 2024 Railway Stakes (G1 1200m) with Waitak for Lance O'Sullivan & Andrew Scott
- 2024 New Zealand Oaks (G1) with Pulchritudinous for Chad Ormsby.
- 2024 Livamol Classic (G1) with Snazzytavi for Graham Richardson & Rogan Norvall
- 2024 Zabeel Classic (G1) with Snazzytavi for Graham Richardson & Rogan Norvall
- 2025 Railway Stakes (G1) with Crocetti for Danny Walker & Arron Tata

== Personal life ==
Warren is the son of former jockey Terrence Kennedy.

Kennedy is married to Barbara (née Badenhorst), with whom he has two daughters. In 2024 Barbara, who trained horses in South Africa, took over the stables of the recently retired Peter and Dawn Williams at Byerley Park.
