= Fellowship (horse) =

Hong Kong-based racehorse

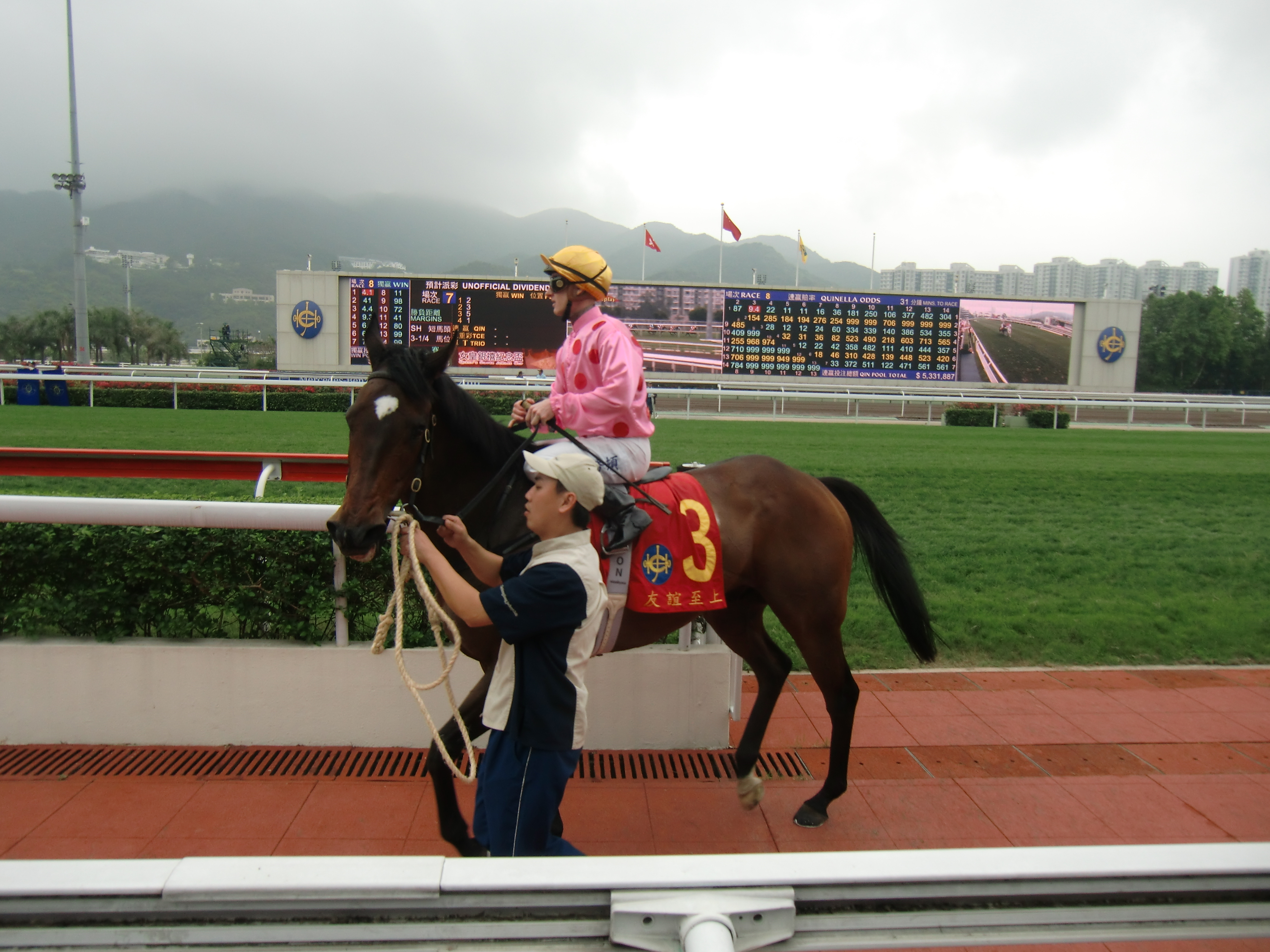
Fellowship

Fellowship (Chinese: 友誼至上; foaled 21 October 2001) is a New Zealand-bred, Hong Kong–based Thoroughbred racehorse.

In the season of 2005–2006, he won the Stewards' Cup (HKG1). In fact it was his second victory over that illustrious pair as they had also had to watch him go in the HKG2 Cathay Pacific International Mile Trial. He also is one of the nominees of Hong Kong Horse of the Year.

== Profile ==
- Sire: O'Reilly
- Dam: Mystical Flight
- Dam's Sire: Danzalion
- Sex: Gelding
- Country : New Zealand
- Colour : Bay
- Owner : David Sin Wai Kin
- Trainer : Paul O’Sullivan
- Record : (No. of 1-2-3-Starts) 7-8-3-34 (As of 27 February 2012)
- Earnings : HK$21,011,500 (As of 27 February 2012)
