= Silent Achiever =

New Zealand-bred Thoroughbred racehorse

- Sire: O'Reilly
- Grandsire: Last Tycoon
- Dam: Winning Spree
- Damsire: Zabeel
- Sex: Filly
- Foaled: 18 September 2008
- Died: 4 February 2021 (aged 12)
- Country: New Zealand
- Colour: Bay
- Breeder: Kevin Hickman
- Owner: Kevin Hickman
- Trainer: Roger James
- Record: 30:10-3-3
- Earnings: A$$3,540,490

Major wins
- The BMW Stakes (2014); Ranvet Stakes (2014); New Zealand Stakes (2014); New Zealand Derby (2012); Championship Stakes (2012); Crystal Mile (2012)

Silent Achiever (18 September 2008 – 4 February 2021) was a champion New Zealand Thoroughbred racehorse. On 3 March 2012, she won the 137th running of the New Zealand Derby. She was the first filly to win the race since 1993, and only the fourth in the last 45 years.

== Background ==
Silent Achiever was trained by Roger James at his Kingsclere Stables in Cambridge, New Zealand. She was bred by Kevin Hickman of Valachi Downs, near Matamata. Hickman noted, "She's got a very balanced pedigree and she's got a very good cardiovascular system and a great turn of foot. Zabeel gives her that stamina and O'Reilly gives her that turn of foot. She's got a great brain on her too. She thinks the runs the world. She's arrogant and she's got a big opinion of herself. She's going to be one of the foundation mares at Valachi Downs that was born and bred on the farm."

== Racing career ==
Silent Achiever was a maiden until 7 December, so a nomination for the Derby wasn't even considered when first nominations were taken in late November. But what followed after her maiden win was an extraordinary rise to stardom. Silent Achiever finished third behind 1000 Guineas winner Planet Rock in the Group 2 Eight Carat Classic on Boxing Day, then won the Group 2 Championship Stakes on 1 January, the Group 3 Waikato Guineas on 28 January - beating then-Derby favourite Ocean Park- and the Group 2 Avondale Guineas on 18 February.

The series of wins was so impressive that she started $2.30 favourite in the New Zealand Derby. And she more than justified the favouritism with an emphatic two-and-a-half-length win over 2000 Guineas winner Rock 'n' Pop.

In her Australian debut, Silent Achiever ran a fast-finishing third behind Laser Hawk in the Rosehill Guineas. That performance saw her start one of the favourites for the Australian Derby, where she finished sixth.

Silent Achiever resumed in the spring of 2012 with a fourth placing at Te Rapa before crossing the Tasman for a two-race Melbourne campaign. She won the Crystal Mile at Moonee Valley Racecourse - the first time a mare has ever won the race.

Following a frustrating 2013 in which she was narrowly beaten in The BMW Stakes and suffered an injury just days out from the Melbourne Cup, Silent Achiever returned to form in 2014 with wins in the New Zealand Stakes and Ranvet Stakes. The latter was her first Group 1 win on Australian soil, and it came in a race billed as "a duel for the title of best horse in the country". At her next start she was successful in The BMW Stakes over 2400m at Rosehill, again defeating It's A Dundeel and Fiorente.

Her Spring campaign got off to a disappointing start with unplaced runs in her first three races, but she returned to form when finishing a close third in the Cox Plate behind Adelaide and Fawkner.

== Retirement and death ==
Silent Achiever retired in May 2015 and was sent to England the same year to be covered by the legendary Frankel on Southern Hemisphere time in her first year at stud. As a broodmare she delivered:

- a filly by Frankel called Lady Faustina, which became a broodmare
- a colt by Frankel
- a colt by Galileo
- a colt by Kingman.

She was also covered by Ocean Park in 2020 but died in early 2021.

Lady Faustina, who died 1 October 2023, has produced:

- Annia Aurelia: a mare by Zacinto (GB), a race winner at Ashburton and Timaru.
- Pitman: a bay colt by Almanzor, who was sold at the 2024 New Zealand Bloodstock Karaka sales to Ciaron Maher Bloodstock for $250,000.

== See also ==
- 2012 New Zealand Derby
- Thoroughbred racing in New Zealand
