= Mo'unga =

New Zealand thoroughbred racehorse

- Sire: Savabeel
- Grandsire: Zabeel
- Dam: Chandelier
- Damsire: O'Reilly
- Sex: Stallion
- Foaled: 20 November 2017
- Country: New Zealand
- Colour: Bay or Brown
- Breeder: Waikato Stud (NZ)
- Owner: Fung Family Racing, KS So, MB Lee, R Mo'unga
- Trainer: Chris Waller (2020); Annabel Neasham (2021 onwards)
- Record: 22: 5–5–3
- Earnings: AU$2,825,790

Major wins
- Rosehill Guineas (2021); Winx Stakes (2021)

Mo'unga (foaled 20 November 2017) is a New Zealand-bred racehorse who won multiple Group 1 races in Australia.

== Background ==
Bred by Waikato Stud in New Zealand, Mo'unga was sold at the 2019 Karaka Yearling Sale. He was purchased for $325,000 by Aquis Farm and relocated to their property in Queensland, Australia.

== Racing career ==
Mo'unga contested his first race on June 20, 2020 at Gold Coast Racecourse in a 2-year-old Maiden race which he won by one length. He was successful in his next two starts at Newcastle and Rosehill before finishing in 7th placing behind Ole Kirk in the Caulfield Guineas. Jockey Damien Oliver said after the race: "I thought he ran well. He’s going to be a really nice horse next preparation with a bit of give in the ground."

In December 2020 it was announced that Mo'unga would change trainers from Chris Waller to Annabel Neasham.

After running placings in the C S Hayes Stakes and Randwick Guineas, Mo'unga won his first Group 1 race in the 2020 Rosehill Guineas. He won his second Group 1 five months later in the Winx Stakes at Randwick.

He was second to Sierra Sue in the 2022 Futurity Stakes (MRC) (1400m) at Caulfield, ahead of Tofane.

== Pedigree ==
Pedigree of Mo'unga (NZ) 2017
Sire Savabeel (NZ) 2001	Zabeel (NZ); 1986	Sir Tristram	Sir Ivor
Sire Savabeel (NZ) 2001	Zabeel (NZ); 1986	Sir Tristram	Isolt
Sire Savabeel (NZ) 2001	Zabeel (NZ); 1986	Lady Giselle	Nureyev
Sire Savabeel (NZ) 2001	Zabeel (NZ); 1986	Lady Giselle	Valderna
Sire Savabeel (NZ) 2001	Savannah Success (AUS); 1995	Success Express	Hold Your Peace
Sire Savabeel (NZ) 2001	Savannah Success (AUS); 1995	Success Express	Au Printemps
Sire Savabeel (NZ) 2001	Savannah Success (AUS); 1995	Alma Mater	Semipalatinsk
Sire Savabeel (NZ) 2001	Savannah Success (AUS); 1995	Alma Mater	Sweetie
Dam Chandelier (NZ) 2009	O'Reilly (NZ); 1993	Last Tycoon	Try My Best
Dam Chandelier (NZ) 2009	O'Reilly (NZ); 1993	Last Tycoon	Mill Princess
Dam Chandelier (NZ) 2009	O'Reilly (NZ); 1993	Courtza	Pompeii Court
Dam Chandelier (NZ) 2009	O'Reilly (NZ); 1993	Courtza	Hunza
Dam Chandelier (NZ) 2009	Cenphic (NZ); 1995	Centaine	Century
Dam Chandelier (NZ) 2009	Cenphic (NZ); 1995	Centaine	Rainbeam
Dam Chandelier (NZ) 2009	Cenphic (NZ); 1995	Seraphic	Imposing
Dam Chandelier (NZ) 2009	Cenphic (NZ); 1995	Seraphic	Torquay
