= Roysyn =

New Zealand-bred Thoroughbred racehorse

- Sire: Bakharoff
- Grandsire: The Minstrel
- Dam: Royal Proposal
- Damsire: Vice Regal
- Sex: Gelding
- Foaled: 24 October 1992
- Country: New Zealand
- Colour: Bay
- Breeder: J W Campin
- Owner: B P & J B Harvey
- Trainer: Roger James
- Record: 22:7-3-1
- Earnings: $491,016

Major wins
- New Zealand Derby (1995); Trackside Sales Stakes (1996)
- Last updated on July 3, 2007

Roysyn (foaled 24 October 1992) is a Thoroughbred racehorse who won the New Zealand Derby in 1995. Roysyn gave trainer Roger James his second Derby win (his first being Tidal Light when in partnership with Jim Gibbs), and rider Vinny Colgan the first of his six Derby wins.

== Racing career ==
After failing in his only start at two, Roysyn started off his three-year-old season with a win in a maiden at Avondale. He followed that up with a placing and another win in low-quality races before finishing only sixth in the Avondale Guineas, his last race before the Derby. He was a changed horse when the 1995 Derby came around, beating Clear Rose and favourite Interval to record a slight upset victory. But he proved it was no fluke result later in the season, winning the Wellington Stakes and then his second Group 1 race in the Trackside Sales Stakes against older horses.

His four-year-old season saw him win the Group 2 Queen Elizabeth Handicap and finish second in the Group 1 Avondale Cup and Group 2 Counties Cup.

He finished a disappointing tenth when one of the favourites in the Auckland Cup and was unable to rediscover his best form when lightly raced in the last two years of his career.

== See also ==
- Thoroughbred racing in New Zealand
