= Grunt (horse) =

New Zealand-bred Thoroughbred racehorse

- Sire: O'Reilly
- Grandsire: Last Tycoon
- Dam: Ruqqaya
- Damsire: Van Nistelrooy
- Sex: Stallion
- Foaled: 12 November 2014
- Country: New Zealand
- Colour: Brown or bay
- Owner: R & C Legh Racing Pty Ltd Syndicate, Wright Racing Syndicate, Gurners Bloodstock Co Syndicate, R Smith, G Pulitano, S Tsalikidis & C Cortese
- Trainer: Mick Price
- Record: 12-5-0-1
- Earnings: A$1,382,450

Major wins
- C S Hayes Stakes (G3)(2018); Australian Guineas (G1)(2018); Makybe Diva Stakes (G1)(2018)
- Last updated on 29 August 2019

Grunt (foaled 12 November 2014) is a retired Thoroughbred racehorse and breeding stallion bred in New Zealand and trained in Australia. He won two Group One races, and over a million dollars.

== Career ==
Grunt made his debut on 20 May 2017 at Flemington. Jumping at odds of $26, he finished third.

After a long spell, Grunt broke his maiden at Werribee on 10 December. On the 26th, he had another "effortless" win at Morphettville. Trainer Mick Price said, "Grunt is a work in progress but is a really good horse. I think he’s a big Flemington horse. I can’t wait to get him to 2000 and 2400 (metres) but he is a colt so we’ll try to maximise value on him."

A short spell followed before Grunt contested the C S Hayes Stakes. Jumping at $7, he settled just off the pace before getting in the clear in the last 200 metres, winning by a short length. Jockey Damien Oliver said, "I really like the way he dug deep when I asked him."

Grunt then won the million dollar Australian Guineas by half a length after starting from the widest gate, with Mick Price then spelling him for almost 6 months. "I'm mindful that he's going to be a really good four-year-old. It wouldn't worry me if I had to put him out. He's not light, but he's not furnished yet," he said.

Returning in the P B Lawrence Stakes on 18 August 2018, Grunt finished 5th, the first time he did not place in a race. Oliver said he ran out of condition at the end of the event. He then placed eighth in another race at Caulfield. Grunt's next race was back at Flemington, where he won the Makybe Diva Stakes at double figures. He sat in fifth, just off the pace, before taking the lead in the last 300 metres. Damien Oliver said, "I've always maintained to Mick he appreciates Flemington so much better, the big open track. And he showed that today." Price added, "He's at home in these Group 1 races. Low-resting heartrate, doesn't listen to anyone and just gets into the zone." In the next month he raced in two further Group 1 races, finishing well off the lead in both.

After a 5-month spell, Grunt returned as top weight in the Group 3 Shaftesbury Avenue Handicap, finishing sixth, and then fifth in the All-Star Mile, his last race.

== Stud career ==
Grunt stood for stud for the first time in 2019, with a service fee of $13750.

=== Notable progeny ===
Commands' Group One winners:

c = colt, f = filly, g = gelding

Foaled	Name	Sex	Major wins
2020	Veight	g	George Ryder Stakes
2022	Strictly Business	f	VRC Oaks
