= Cambridge Stud =

Coordinates: 37.8568°S 175.4078°E

Cambridge Stud is a Thoroughbred stud farm established in 1976 at Cambridge, New Zealand, by Sir Patrick Hogan.

== Stud sires ==
It has had a number of top quality stallions including:

- Almanzor: winner of the 2015 Grand Critérium de Bordeaux, 2016 Prix de Guiche, Prix du Jockey Club, Prix Guillaume d'Ornano, Irish Champion Stakes, Champion Stakes.
- Burgundy: winner of the Cambridge Breeders Stakes (1200m) and Mr Tiz Trophy (1200m).
- Cape Blanco
- Cape Cross, winner of the 1998 Group 1 Lockinge Stakes and Group 2 Queen Anne Stakes and Celebration Mile of 1999. Sire of Seachange.
- Chaldean: In 2024 Chaldean, winner of the 2022 Dewhurst Stakes and 2023 2000 Guineas Stakes, commenced as a shuttle stallion at Cambridge Stud in New Zealand for a service fee of NZ$35,000.
- Embellish: winner of the 2017 New Zealand 2000 Guineas
- Hello Youmzain: winner of the 2018 Critérium de Maisons-Laffitte, 2019 Sandy Lane Stakes, Haydock Sprint Cup and 2020 Diamond Jubilee Stakes.
- Highly Recommended: winner of the 2012 Alister Clark Stakes
- Keeper: winner of the 2001 The Goodwood and Victoria Handicap
- Lucky Unicorn
- Maroof: winner of the 1994 Queen Elizabeth II Stakes
- One Cool Cat: winner of the 2003 Phoenix Stakes and National Stakes
- Rhythm
- Sir Tristram: sire of 45 Group 1 winners and inducted into the New Zealand Racing Hall of Fame.
- Stravinsky: winner of the 1999 Group 1 July Cup at Newmarket and Nunthorpe Stakes
- Sword Of State: winner of the 2021 Sistema Stakes
- Tavistock
- Viking Ruler
- Zabeel

== Broodmares ==
Cambridge Stud was also home to the great broodmare Eight Carat (GB) by Pieces of Eight from Klairessa. She was New Zealand Broodmare of the Year in 1995, 1996 and 1997. In 1996 Eight Carat was named Broodmare of the Year by the international journal Owner-Breeder (USA). She produced five Group One winners:

- Diamond Lover (1982, by Sticks and Stones), won the 1987 Railway Stakes (New Zealand)
- Kaapstad (1984, by Sir Tristram), won the 1987 VRC Sires Produce Stakes
- Marquise (1991, by Gold and Ivory), won the 1996 Captain Cook Stakes
- Octagonal (1992, by Zabeel), won ten Group Ones including the 1995 Cox Plate and 1997 Chipping Norton Stakes
- Mouawad (1993, by Zabeel), won the 1997 George Ryder Stakes, Futurity Stakes (Australia) and Australian Guineas.

The Stud also had Taiona, the New Zealand Broodmare of the Year in 1981 and 1983. She was the dam of:

- Gurner's Lane, winner of the 1982 Caulfield Cup and 1982 Melbourne Cup.
- Sovereign Red, winner of the 1980 Victoria Derby
- Trichelle, winner of the 1985 Marlboro Cup.

== Change of ownership ==
Cambridge Stud was purchased by Brendan and Jo Lindsay in 2017. They appointed Henry Plumptre as Chief Executive.

== See also ==
- Thoroughbred racing in New Zealand
- Trelawney Stud
- Windsor Park Stud
