= O'Reilly (horse) =

New Zealand thoroughbred racehorse

- O'Reilly on pasture
- Sire: Last Tycoon (Ire)
- Grandsire: Try My Best (USA)
- Dam: Courtza (NZ)
- Damsire: Pompeii Court (USA)
- Sex: Stallion
- Foaled: 24 August 1993
- Died: 31 December 2014 (aged 21)
- Country: New Zealand
- Breeder: Waikato Stud Holdings Limited
- Owner: Gary J Chittick
- Trainer: Dave and Paul O'Sullivan
- Record: 6: 4-1-0

Major wins
- Levin Classic (1996), Telegraph Handicap (1997)

O'Reilly (24 August 1993 – 31 December 2014) was a New Zealand bred and trained thoroughbred racehorse who won two Group 1 races.

O'Reilly was bred by Waikato Stud Holdings Limited. His dam, Courtza, was the winner of the 1989 Golden Slipper Stakes. He was named after the Irish international rugby player and businessman Tony O'Reilly.

He was entered in the 1995 Karaka Yearling Sales but was unable to be sold when he failed a veterinary test, due to an abnormality in his larynx, so he was retained by his owner, Gary Chittick.

== Racing career ==
O'Reilly was initially placed with Melbourne trainer, Gerald Ryan, but due to injuries was put out to paddock for eight months. After his rest he was then trained by Dave and Paul O'Sullivan at Matamata and ridden in all his races by Lance O'Sullivan.

In the November 1996 Bayer Classic Group 1 event for 3 year old horses at Otaki, he beat High Return and Rebel.

In January 1997, he contested the Telegraph Handicap at Trentham, an open handicap event over 1200m, winning by 2 3/4 lengths in 1:07.36 over Krispin Klear and Jazzac.

On 15 February 1997, he placed second to Mouawad in the Australian Guineas 1600m at Flemington Racecourse.

However, during his next start, in the 1200m Newmarket Handicap at Flemington, he ruptured a suspensory ligament which finished his racing career after only six race day starts.

Remarkably, O’Reilly was New Zealand Horse of the Year for 1996 and 1997, champion sprinter, and champion miler.

== Stud career ==
After sustaining an injury that caused him to retire from racing, O'Reilly was put to stallion duties at Waikato Stud.

O'Reilly proved to be very successful as a stallion and ended up standing for a fee of $60,000.

He died in his paddock at Waikato Stud in Matamata, on December 31, 2014, of a suspected ruptured aorta.

=== Notable progeny ===
O'Reilly has produced 15 individual Group One winners:

c = colt, f = filly, g = gelding

Foaled	Name	Sex	Dam	Dam Sire	Major Wins
1999	The Jewel	f	The Grin	Grosvenor	New Zealand 1000 Guineas; New Zealand International Stakes
2001	Swick	g	Creme Anglaise (NZ)	Crested Wave	VRC Sprint Classic
2002	Fellowship	g	Mystical Flight	Danzalion	Hong Kong Stewards' Cup
2002	Master O'Reilly	g	Without Remorse (NZ)	Bakharoff (US)	Caulfield Cup
2003	Guyno	g	River Century	Centaine	WATC Derby
2004	Alamosa	c	Lodore Mystik	Centaine	Ford Diamond Stakes; Thorndon Mile; Otaki-Maori Weight for Age; Toorak Handicap
2007	Shamrocker	f	Bohemian Blues	Blues Traveller (Ire)	Australian Guineas; AJC Derby
2008	Silent Achiever	f	Winning Spree	Zabeel	New Zealand Derby; New Zealand Stakes; Ranvet Stakes; The BMW
2009	Sacred Falls	c	Iguazu's Girl	Redoute's Choice	New Zealand 2000 Guineas; Doncaster Handicap (twice); George Main Stakes
2009	Shamexpress	g	Volkrose	Volksraad	Newmarket Handicap
2011	O'Marilyn	f	Monroe Magic	Zabeel	Manawatu Sires Produce Stakes
2013	MacO'Reilly	g	Double Babu	Centaine	New Zealand International Stakes; New Zealand Stakes
2013	Tiptronic	g	Tiptoes	Pins	Herbie Dyke Stakes; Zabeel Classic
2014	Grunt	c	Ruqqaya	Van Nistelrooy	Australian Guineas; Makybe Diva Stakes
2015	Brutal	c	Alberton Princess	Golan (Ire)	Doncaster Handicap

He was New Zealand's top sire in 2007/08, 2011/12, 2012/13, and 2013/14.

=== As a Dam Sire ===
Daughters of O'Reilly have produced stakes winners such as:

- Daffodil (No Excuse Needed - Spring), winner of the 2008 New Zealand 1000 Guineas, 2009 AJC Oaks and Windsor Park Plate.
- Steps In Time (Danehill Dancer - Rare Insight), winner of the 2012 Bill Ritchie Handicap, 2012 & 2013 Breeders Classic and 2014 Coolmore Classic.
- Mo'unga (Savabeel - Chandelier), winner of the 2021 Winx Stakes and Rosehill Guineas
- Pride Of Jenni (Pride Of Dubai - Sancerre), winner of the 2023 Empire Rose Stakes & Cantala Stakes and 2024 All-Star Mile, Queen Elizabeth Stakes (ATC) & Feehan Stakes.

=== As a Grand sire ===
- Ka Ying Rising, winner of the 2024 Hong Kong Sprint, 2025 Centenary Sprint Cup, Queen's Silver Jubilee Cup and Chairman's Sprint Prize

=== Sire sons ===
A number of sons of O'Reilly have become sires:

- Alamosa (2004, dam: Lodore Mystic by Centaine), sire of Kirramosa and Stolen Dance
- O'Reilly's Choice (2013, Dorotea Dior by Redoute's Choice)
- Sacred Falls (2009–2019, Iguazu's Girl by Redoute's Choice), sire of Icebath and Aegon
- Shamexpress (2009, Volkrose by Volksraad), sire of Coventina Bay
- The King (2011, The Grin by Grosvenor)

== See also ==
Thoroughbred racing in New Zealand
