= Reset (horse) =

Australian-bred Thoroughbred racehorse

- Sire: Zabeel
- Grandsire: Sir Tristram
- Dam: Assertive Lass
- Damsire: Zeditave
- Sex: Stallion
- Foaled: 3 November 2000
- Died: 4 May 2021 (aged 20)
- Country: Australia
- Colour: Bay
- Breeder: DPR Esplin
- Owner: Lloyd Williams
- Trainer: Graeme Rogerson
- Jockey: Danny Nikolic
- Record: 5: 5-0-0
- Earnings: A$850,000

Major wins
- Cadbury Guineas (2004); Futurity Stakes (2004)

Reset (3 November 2000 – 4 May 2021) was an Australian-bred Thoroughbred racehorse and sire by the leading sire in Australia and New Zealand, Zabeel out of the multiple Group One winner Assertive Lass.

== Racing career ==
He raced only as a three-year-old, in the 2003–2004 season, and recorded five wins from as many starts, including the Cadbury Guineas and the Futurity Stakes - both at Group One level. In the Guineas, he narrowly defeated Starcraft, who went on to win two Group One races in Europe. Rather than continuing his career, Reset was sold at four years of age to Darley Stud, Australia.

After 15 years as a stallion, Reset was retired by Darley in 2019, having sired 34 stakes winners and his progeny earning $55 million in prizemoney.

Reset died on the 4 May 2021 aged 20 years.

== Stud career ==
Reset sired five individual Group 1 winners:

c = colt, f = filly, g = gelding

Foaled	Name	Sex	Major wins
2005	Rebel Raider	c	Victoria Derby; South Australian Derby
2007	Fawkner	g	Caulfield Cup; Caulfield Stakes; Makybe Diva Stakes
2007	Pinker Pinker	f	W S Cox Plate
2011	Hauraki	g	Epsom Handicap
2011	Set Square	f	VRC Oaks

== See also ==
- List of leading Thoroughbred racehorses
