= Michael Dee =

New Zealand jockey

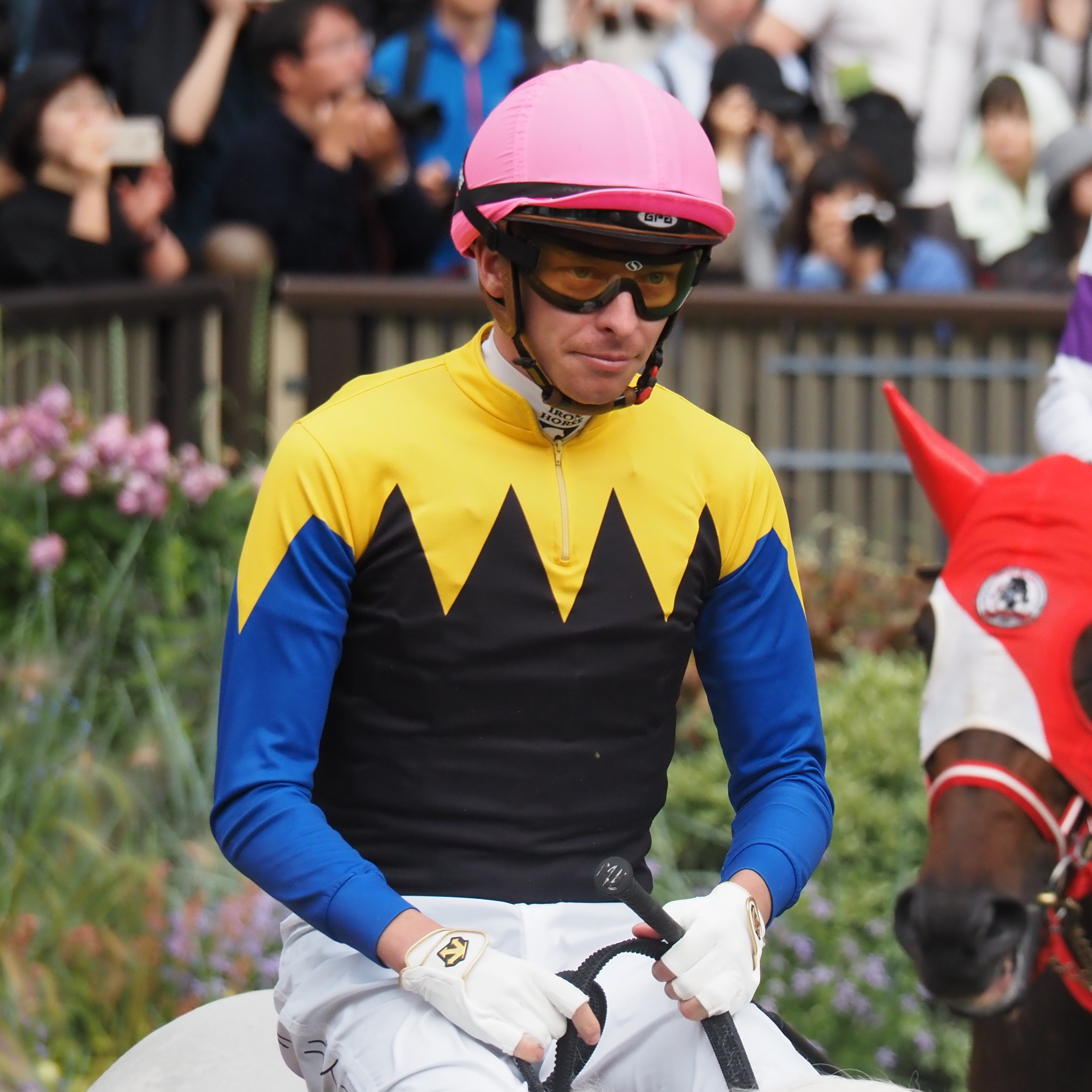
- Dee at the 2025 Meguro Kinen parade ring
- Occupation: Jockey
- Born: 13 April 1996 (age 29); New Zealand
- Height: 173 cm (5 ft 8 in)
- Weight: 54 kg (119 lb)

Major racing wins
- Australian Guineas; Caulfield Cup; Victoria Derby

Significant horses
- Durston, Manzoice

Michael Dee (born April 13, 1996) is a New Zealand born jockey who currently rides in Victoria, Australia. He is notable for having ridden the winners of a number of Group One races.

== Racing career ==
Michael's father, Richard Dee was a thoroughbred trainer. Michael started his riding career with the Hawkes Bay trainers Guy Lowry and Grant Cullen before moving to Kevin Myers in Wanganui.

Dee had his first race-ride aboard Negotiate when placed 2nd at Stratford on 31 December 2012 for Kevin Myers. His first win was on the Adrian Bull gelding, Bamboo, at New Plymouth in a Rating 65 benchmark 1200m race on January 17, 2013.

During his initial riding career in New Zealand he achieved:

- 2012/13 - 17 wins from 233 rides
- 2013/14 - 65 wins from 728 rides
- 2014/15 - 24 wins from 307 rides

In January 2015 Dee moved to Caulfield and completed his apprenticeship with Mick Price.

Michael Dee's first ride in the Melbourne Cup was on Gallante which finished last behind Rekindling in the 2017 race. He has also placed:

- 5th on Persan for Ciaron Maher & David Eustace in the 2020 Melbourne Cup
- 14th on Great House for Chris Waller in the 2021 Melbourne Cup
- 16th on Sharp 'N' Smart in the 2024 Melbourne Cup.

In 2023, Dee was engaged to ride in Hong Kong.

In 2025, Dee was engaged to ride in Japan from April 26 to June 25.

== Major wins ==
Australia

- Australian Guineas - (2) - Lunar Fox (2021), Legarto (2023)
- Blue Diamond Stakes - (2) - Little Brose (2023), Devil Knight (2025)
- Caulfield Cup - (1) - Durston (2022)
- Coolmore Classic - (1) - Espiona (2023)
- Orr Stakes - (1) - Alabama Express (2020)
- Sir Rupert Clarke Stakes - (1) - Magic Time (2023)
- The Goodwood - (1) - Royal Merchant (2023)
- The Metropolitan - (1) - Foundr (2017)
- Victoria Derby - (1) - Manzoice (2022)
- Vinery Stud Stakes - (1) - Hiyaam (2018)
- VRC Champions Mile - (1) - Shillelagh (2017)

New Zealand

- New Zealand Derby - (1) - Willydoit (2025)

== See also ==
- Thoroughbred racing in Australia
- Thoroughbred racing in New Zealand
