= Isle of Man (horse) =

New Zealand Thoroughbred racehorse

- Sire: Habitation
- Grandsire: Habitat
- Dam: Full O'Tricks
- Damsire: Trictrac
- Sex: Stallion
- Foaled: 1978
- Country: New Zealand
- Colour: Bay
- Breeder: R F Langsford
- Owner: R F Langsford & D L Waddell
- Trainer: Davina Waddell
- Record: 37: 8-6-3
- Earnings: $297,787

Major wins
- New Zealand Derby (1981); Rosehill Guineas (1982)
- Last updated on February 26, 2008

Isle of Man was a thoroughbred racehorse known mainly for winning the New Zealand Derby in 1981. He went on to win the 1982 Rosehill Guineas.
