= Pins (horse) =

Australian-bred thoroughbred racehorse and sire

- Sire: Snippets (Aus)
- Grandsire: Lunchtime (GB)
- Dam: No Finer (Aus)
- Damsire: Kaoru Star (Aus)
- Sex: Stallion
- Foaled: 10/9/1996
- Country: Australia
- Colour: Bay
- Breeder: Amadi Park Ltd
- Owner: (1) Maurice & Mrs Dulcie Macleod, Amadi Park Ltd (2) Ancroft Stud Ltd, Garry & Mark Chittick, Fairdale Stud Ltd & Little Avondale Trust
- Trainer: Clarry Connors
- Record: 14:7-3-0
- Last updated on April 21, 2025,

Pins (1996–2018) was a Group 1 winning Australian thoroughbred racehorse, who became a successful stud sire in New Zealand.

== Breeding ==
Pins was bred by Maurice MacLeod and owned by him and his wife Dulcie MacLeod through their company, Amadi Park Ltd. His dam was the Australian mare No Finer and he was sired by the Australian stallion Snippets who won the AJC Sires Produce Stakes, Oakleigh Plate and The Galaxy.

== Racing career ==
Pins won seven of his fourteen starts and was also placed three times.

He won his debut over 1100m at Warwick Farm on 4 March 1999, ridden by Brian York. Three races later he won again over 1250m at Canterbury with Shane Dye aboard. In September of that year he won the Group 2 Stan Fox Stakes over 1400m, again with Shane Dye.

After a 5th in the Caulfield Guineas he was spelled and in his first race back he and Dye combined to win the listed Zeditave Stakes (1200m, Caulfield). After running 2nd in the listed Debonair, he won three major races in a row in early 2000:

- the Alister Clark Stakes (G2 1600m) at Moonee Valley (Shane Dye)
- the AAMI Classic (G2 1800m) at Caulfield (Patrick Payne)
- the Australian Guineas (G1 1600m) at Flemington (Shane Dye)

His last race was on 8 April 2000 when he was 6th in the George Ryder Stakes (G1, 1500m), less than 2 lengths from the winner Al Mansour.

== Stud career ==
Pins was purchased by Ancroft Stud Ltd, Garry & Mark Chittick (Waikato Stud), Fairdale Stud Ltd & Little Avondale Trust and stood at Waikato Stud. He was the sire of 75 stakes winners and many individual Group One winners. Notable progeny included:

- Aerovelocity, winner of the 2014 Hong Kong Sprint.
- Ambitious Dragon, Hong Kong Horse of the Year in 2010-11 and 2011-12
- Antonio Lombardo, winner of the 2011 Hawke's Bay Guineas (G2 1400m)
- El Segundo, winner of the 2007 Cox Plate
- Katie Lee, winner of the 2009 New Zealand 1000 Guineas and New Zealand 2000 Guineas double
- Legless Veuve, winner of the 2016 Thousand Guineas Prelude & 2017 Manfred Stakes (G3 1600m)
- Legs, winner of the 2006 New Zealand Oaks (G1 2400m) and Kelt Capital Stakes (G1 2040m)
- Megapins, winner of the 2009 Wellington Cup

Pins initially stood at a fee of $9,000 but his service fee reached $50,000 and he won the Centaine Award for the leading New Zealand-based sire for global progeny earnings twice. He was also the champion sire in Hong Kong on two occasions.

Pins died in April 2018 due to complications from colic.

=== Dam sire ===
Pins will continue to be found in the pedigree of many top New Zealand or Australian horses. For example, he is the dam sire of the following:

- Brambles (Savabeel-Prickle, by Pins), winner of the 2012 Queensland Derby
- I Wish I Win (Savabeel - Make A Wish, by Pins), winner of the 2023 TJ Smith Stakes & 2022 Golden Eagle
- Probabeel (Savabeel - Far Fetched, by Pins), multiple Group 1 winner
- Savvy Coup (Savabeel - Eudora, by Pins), winner of the 2018 Livamol Classic & New Zealand Oaks
- Savvy Yong Blonk (Savabeel - Ampin, by Pins), winner of the 2021 Livamol Classic
- Stratum Star (Stratum -Purely Spectacular, by Pins), winner of the 2015 Sir Rupert Clarke Stakes (G1 1400m) & 2016 Kingston Town Classic (G1 1800m).

== See also ==
- Thoroughbred racing in New Zealand
