= Tidal Light =

Thoroughbred racehorse

- Sire: Diagramatic
- Grandsire: Sir Wiggle
- Dam: Azores
- Damsire: King Of Babylon
- Sex: Filly
- Foaled: 1983
- Country: New Zealand
- Colour: Brown
- Breeder: Mr & Mrs J D O'Flaherty
- Owner: S A Taylor
- Trainer: Jim Gibbs
- Record: 19:10-2-1
- Earnings: $567,678

Major wins
- New Zealand Derby (1986); Canterbury Guineas (1987)

Tidal Light was a Thoroughbred racehorse who was the champion filly of her year and beat the colts in the 1987 New Zealand Derby.

After finishing second in her debut, Tidal Light won ten of her next 13 races, including the Derby, Avondale Guineas, Waikato Guineas, Canterbury Guineas and a Group 1 victory in the Air New Zealand Stakes over older horses under weight-for-age conditions, beating the great Solveig.

She was ridden in most of her 3 year old races by the 1986-87 champion apprentice, Michael Coleman. However, after winning the Avondale Guineas, Coleman broke a bone in his hand and was replaced by Grant Cooksley for Tidal Light's New Zealand Derby win.

She returned in the spring of 1987 as a four-year-old, but failed to win a race and despite some good performances was obviously not the same horse she had been the previous season.

Her three-year-old season earned her both the Three Year-Old of the Year award and Horse of the Year, a rare feat for a filly.

== Breeding career ==
She produced 12 foals for seven race winners and was at Woodlands Stud in Hunter Valley, Australia.

She died in March 2007.

== See also ==
- Thoroughbred racing in New Zealand
