= Roger James (horse trainer) =

New Zealand racehorse trainer

Personal information
- Born: New Zealand
- Occupation: Racehorse trainer

Horse racing career
- Sport: Horse racing

Significant horses
- Concert Hall, Foxwood, Hades, Pinarello, Roysyn, Silent Achiever, Tidal Light, Two Illicit, Zonda

Roger James is a New Zealand Thoroughbred racehorse trainer. He is notable for having trained seven New Zealand Derby winners, which is more than any other trainer in New Zealand and for having won many Group One races in New Zealand and Australia.

He has trained in excess of 1,200 winners.

Roger James has trained on his own account but also in partnership with:

- Jim Gibbs
- Lance Noble
- Paul Mirabelli
- Ron Taylor
- Robert Wellwood

== Notable horses and victories ==
Roger James has trained or co-trained a large number of high-class horses, including:

- Concert Hall, winner of the 2020 Zabeel Classic.
- Foxwood, winner of the 1998 Captain Cook Stakes.
- Giovana, winner of the 2000 Queensland Oaks, 2001 International Stakes, 2002 Oaks Stud Classic and Thorndon Mile
- Hades, winner of the 1999 New Zealand Derby.
- He's Remarkable, first past the post in the 2011 Railway Stakes at Ascot but demoted on protest by Perth stewards.
- Orchestral, winner of the 2024 New Zealand Derby, 2024 Vinery Stud Stakes and 2025 Aotearoa Classic
- Pinarello, winner of the 2022 Championship Stakes and Queensland Derby.
- Prowess, winner of the 2023 Vinery Stud Stakes, Bonecrusher New Zealand Stakes, Karaka Million 3YO Classic
- Road To Paris, winner of the 2026 New Zealand Derby
- Roysyn, winner of the 1995 New Zealand Derby.
- Silent Achiever, winner of the 2012 New Zealand Derby, 2014 The BMW Stakes, Ranvet Stakes and New Zealand Stakes.
- Tidal Light, winner of the 1986 New Zealand Derby.
- Two Illicit, winner of the 2021 Captain Cook Stakes.
- Zonda, winner of the 1997 New Zealand Derby.

== See also ==
- Murray Baker
- Opie Bosson
- Trevor McKee
- Mike Moroney
- Dave O'Sullivan
- Lance O'Sullivan
- Jamie Richards
- Graeme Rogerson
- Mark Walker
- Chris Waller
- Thoroughbred racing in New Zealand
