= Savabeel =

Australian-bred Thoroughbred racehorse (2001–2026)

- Sire: Zabeel
- Grandsire: Sir Tristram
- Dam: Savannah Success
- Damsire: Success Express
- Sex: Stallion
- Foaled: 23 September 2001
- Died: 19 June 2026 (aged 24)
- Country: Australia
- Colour: Brown
- Breeder: Glenlogan Park
- Owner: Graeme Rogerson, B Reid, M Whitby et al
- Trainer: Graeme Rogerson
- Record: 14: 3-3-1

Major wins
- Spring Champion Stakes (2004); W. S. Cox Plate (2004)

Savabeel (23 September 2001 – 19 June 2026) was an Australian Thoroughbred race horse and active sire. He is best known for his win in the 2004 Cox Plate. He was trained by Graeme Rogerson, and ridden by Chris Munce in his most important wins.

== Breeding ==
Savabeel, foaled on 23 September 2001, was a brown horse sired by champion New Zealand sire Zabeel out of the multiple Group winner Savannah Success.

Savannah Success had won the 1999 New Zealand Oaks and Ansett Australia Stakes at Group 1 level and the Surround Stakes (Group 2) as well as a number of other Group and listed New Zealand races.

== Racing career ==
In Spring 2004 he won the race considered the Weight for Age Championship of Australasia, the Cox Plate, beating the previous year's winner Fields of Omagh. He was the first three-year-old to win the race since another son of Zabeel, Octagonal won the race nine years earlier in 1995. At the time of Savabeel's Cox Plate win, Rogerson described him as the best horse he had ever trained.

Savabeel also won the Group One 2004 Spring Champion Stakes over 2000m at Randwick.

After an excellent run for second behind Elvstroem in the C F Orr Stakes in February 2005, Savabeel had an unsuccessful autumn campaign which saw him only place once before he was retired to stud in 2005.

All in all, he retired the winner of $2,760,460 in stakes. Savabeel started on 14 occasions, winning 3 and placing on 4 occasions.

== Death ==
Announced on 19 June 2026, Savabeel died at the age of 24 as a result of a freak paddock incident in which he broke his shoulder.

== Stud career ==
Savabeel stood at Waikato Stud in the North Island of New Zealand, as one of the primary stallions.

He made a clean sweep of New Zealand's three stallion categories for the 2016–17 season. For the second straight year the stallion won the Grosvenor Award for New Zealand stakes earnings, the Dewar Stallion Trophy for Australasian earnings and the Centaine Award for global earnings.

At the 2025 Karaka sales a filly by Savabeel out of the O'Reilly mare Symphonic, full-sister to Orchestral, fetched a price of $2.4 million.

=== Notable stock ===
Savabeel sired 33 individual Group One winners:

'c = colt, f = filly, g = gelding

Foaled	Name	Sex	Dam	Dam sire	Major wins
2007	Scarlett Lady	f	On Call (NZ)	Ironclad (NZ)	Queensland Oaks; New Zealand Stakes
2008	Brambles	g	Prickle (NZ)	Pins (Aus)	Queensland Derby
2008	Diademe	f	Bling (NZ)	O'Reilly (NZ)	New Zealand Thoroughbred Breeders Stakes
2008	Sangster	g	Quinta Special (Ire)	Spectrum (Ire)	Victoria Derby; International Stakes; Auckland Cup
2009	Costume	f	Disguised (NZ)	O'Reilly (NZ)	Herbie Dyke Stakes; Livamol Classic
2009	Soriano	f	Call Me Lily (NZ)	Just A Dancer (NZ)	Zabeel Classic; Herbie Dyke Stakes
2010	Kawi	g	Magic Time (NZ)	Volksraad (GB)	Challenge Stakes (x2); Zabeel Classic; Thorndon Mile; Horlicks Plate; Haunui Farm Classic; Captain Cook Stakes
2010	Lucia Valentina	f	Staryn Glenn (NZ)	Montjeu (Ire)	Vinery Stud Stakes; Turnbull Stakes; Queen Elizabeth Stakes
2011	Savaria	f	Amathea (NZ)	O'Reilly (NZ)	New Zealand Oaks
2011	Shillelagh	f	Trocair (Aus)	Flying Spur (Aus)	Kennedy Mile; Empire Rose Stakes
2011	Sound Proposition	g	Ebony Babe (NZ)	Ebony Grosve (NZ)	Easter Handicap
2012	Pasadena Girl	f	Nina From Pasadena	Redoute's Choice	Champagne Stakes
2013	Hall Of Fame	c	Around The Clock (AUS)	Galileo (Ire)	Levin Classic
2015	Nicoletta	f	Celtic Crown (US)	Doneraile Court (US)	New Zealand Thoroughbred Breeders Stakes
2014	Embellish	c	Bling (NZ)	O'Reilly (NZ)	New Zealand 2000 Guineas
2014	Hasahalo	f	Halloween	Encosta De Lago	New Zealand 1000 Guineas
2014	Savvy Coup	f	Eudora (NZ)	Pins (Aus)	New Zealand Oaks; Livamol Classic
2015	Prise de Fer	g	Foil (AUS)	Snippets (AUS)	Captain Cook Stakes
2015	Savy Yong Blonk	f	Ampin (NZ)	Pins (Aus)	Livamol Classic
2015	Sword Of Osman	c	Bunyah (Ire)	Distant View (US)	Sistema Stakes
2015	The Chosen One	c	Glitzy One (Aus)	Flying Spur (AUS)	Thorndon Mile
2016	Probabeel	f	Far Fetched (NZ)	Pins (Aus)	Surround Stakes; Epsom Handicap; Futurity Stakes; Caulfield Stakes
2017	Amarelinha	f	Hopscotch (NZ)	Bahroona (US)	New Zealand Oaks
2017	Atishu	f	Posy (NZ)	No Excuse Needed (GB)	Queen of the Turf Stakes; Champions Stakes; Empire Rose Stakes
2017	Cool Aza Beel	c	Cool 'N' Sassy	Testa Rossa (AUS)	Sistema Stakes
2017	Mo'unga	c	Chandelier (NZ)	O'Reilly (NZ)	Rosehill Guineas; Winx Stakes
2018	I Wish I Win	g	Make A Wish (NZ)	Pins (AUS)	TJ Smith Stakes
2018	Noverre	c	Magic Dancer	Rip Van Winkle (IRE)	New Zealand 2000 Guineas
2018	The Perfect Pink	f	The Solitaire	O'Reilly (NZ)	New Zealand 1000 Guineas
2019	Major Beel	g	Gram (NZ)	O'Reilly (NZ)	Australian Derby
2019	Provence	f	Sombreuil (AUS)	Flying Spur (Aus)	Thorndon Mile; New Zealand Thoroughbred Breeders Stakes; Mufhasa Classic
2020	Orchestral	f	Symphonic (NZ)	O'Reilly (NZ)	New Zealand Derby; Vinery Stud Stakes
2021	Savaglee	c	Glee (NZ)	O'Reilly (NZ)	New Zealand 2000 Guineas

== Honors and recognition ==
Savabeel was inducted into the New Zealand Racing Hall of Fame at the 11 May 2025 Hamilton dinner.

== Pedigree ==
Pedigree of Savabeel (AUS) 2001
Sire Zabeel (NZ) 1986	Sir Tristram (IRE); 1971	Sir Ivor	Sir Gaylord
Sire Zabeel (NZ) 1986	Sir Tristram (IRE); 1971	Sir Ivor	Attica
Sire Zabeel (NZ) 1986	Sir Tristram (IRE); 1971	Isolt	Round Table
Sire Zabeel (NZ) 1986	Sir Tristram (IRE); 1971	Isolt	All My Eye
Sire Zabeel (NZ) 1986	Lady Giselle (FR); 1982	Nureyev	Northern Dancer
Sire Zabeel (NZ) 1986	Lady Giselle (FR); 1982	Nureyev	Special
Sire Zabeel (NZ) 1986	Lady Giselle (FR); 1982	Valderna	Val de Loir
Sire Zabeel (NZ) 1986	Lady Giselle (FR); 1982	Valderna	Derna
Dam Savannah Success (AUS) 1995	Success Express (USA); 1985	Hold Your Peace	Speak John
Dam Savannah Success (AUS) 1995	Success Express (USA); 1985	Hold Your Peace	Blue Moon
Dam Savannah Success (AUS) 1995	Success Express (USA); 1985	Au Printemps	Dancing Champ
Dam Savannah Success (AUS) 1995	Success Express (USA); 1985	Au Printemps	Lorgnette
Dam Savannah Success (AUS) 1995	Alma Mater (AUS); 1988	Semipalatinsk	Nodouble
Dam Savannah Success (AUS) 1995	Alma Mater (AUS); 1988	Semipalatinsk	School Board
Dam Savannah Success (AUS) 1995	Alma Mater (AUS); 1988	Sweetie	Without Fear
Dam Savannah Success (AUS) 1995	Alma Mater (AUS); 1988	Sweetie	Virginia

== See also ==
- Thoroughbred racing in Australia
- Thoroughbred racing in New Zealand
