= Australian Guineas =

- Class: Group 1
- Location: Flemington Racecourse
- Inaugurated: 1986
- Race type: Thoroughbred

Race information
- Distance: 1,600 metres
- Surface: Turf
- Qualification: Three year old
- Weight: Set weights colts and geldings – 56 1/2 kg fillies – 54 1/2 kg
- Purse: $1,000,000 (2026)

The Australian Guineas is a Victoria Racing Club Group 1 Thoroughbred horse race for three-year-olds, run at set weights, over a distance of 1600 metres at Flemington Racecourse, in Melbourne, Australia in March during the VRC Autumn Racing Carnival.

== History ==
=== Name ===
- 1986–2004 – Australasian Guineas
- 2005–2009 – Cadbury Guineas
- 2010 – Crown Guineas
- 2011 onwards – Australian Guineas

=== Distance ===
- 1986–1997 – 1600 metres
- 1998–2000 – 2000 metres
- 2001 onwards – 1600 metres

=== Grade ===
- 1986 – Group 3
- 1987 onwards – Group 1

=== Venue ===
- The race was run at Caulfield Racecourse in 2007 due to reconstruction of the Flemington racetrack.

=== Recent multiple winners ===
Ciaron Maher trained the winner in 2022 (with David Eustace), 2024 and 2026. Mick Price was the successful trainer in 2008, 2009 and 2018.

Craig Newitt and Noel Callow had consecutive wins in 2008 and 2009 and in 2005 and 2006 respectively. Michael Dee rode the winner in 2021 and 2023 as did Craig Williams in 2007 and 2014.

== Winners ==
The following are past winners of the race.

- 2026 - Observer
- 2025 – Feroce
- 2024 – Southport Tycoon
- 2023 – Legarto
- 2022 – Hitotsu
- 2021 – Lunar Fox
- 2020 – Alligator Blood
- 2019 – Mystic Journey
- 2018 – Grunt
- 2017 – Hey Doc
- 2016 – Palentino
- 2015 – Wandjina
- 2014 – Shamus Award
- 2013 – Ferlax
- 2012 – Mosheen
- 2011 – Shamrocker
- 2010 – Rock Classic
- 2009 – Heart Of Dreams
- 2008 – Light Fantastic
- 2007 – Miss Finland
- 2006 – Apache Cat
- 2005 – Al Maher
- 2004 – Reset
- 2003 – Delago Brom
- 2002 – Dash For Cash
- 2001 – Mr. Murphy
- 2000 – Pins
- 1999 – Dignity Dancer
- 1998 – Gold Guru
- 1997 – Mouawad
- 1996 – Flying Spur
- 1995 – Baryshnikov
- 1994 – Mahogany
- 1993 – Kenny's Best Pal
- 1992 – Jolly Old Mac
- 1991 – Triscay
- 1990 – Zabeel
- 1989 – King’s High
- 1988 – Flotilla
- 1987 – Military Plume
- 1986 – True Version
