= Zabeel =

New Zealand-bred Thoroughbred racehorse

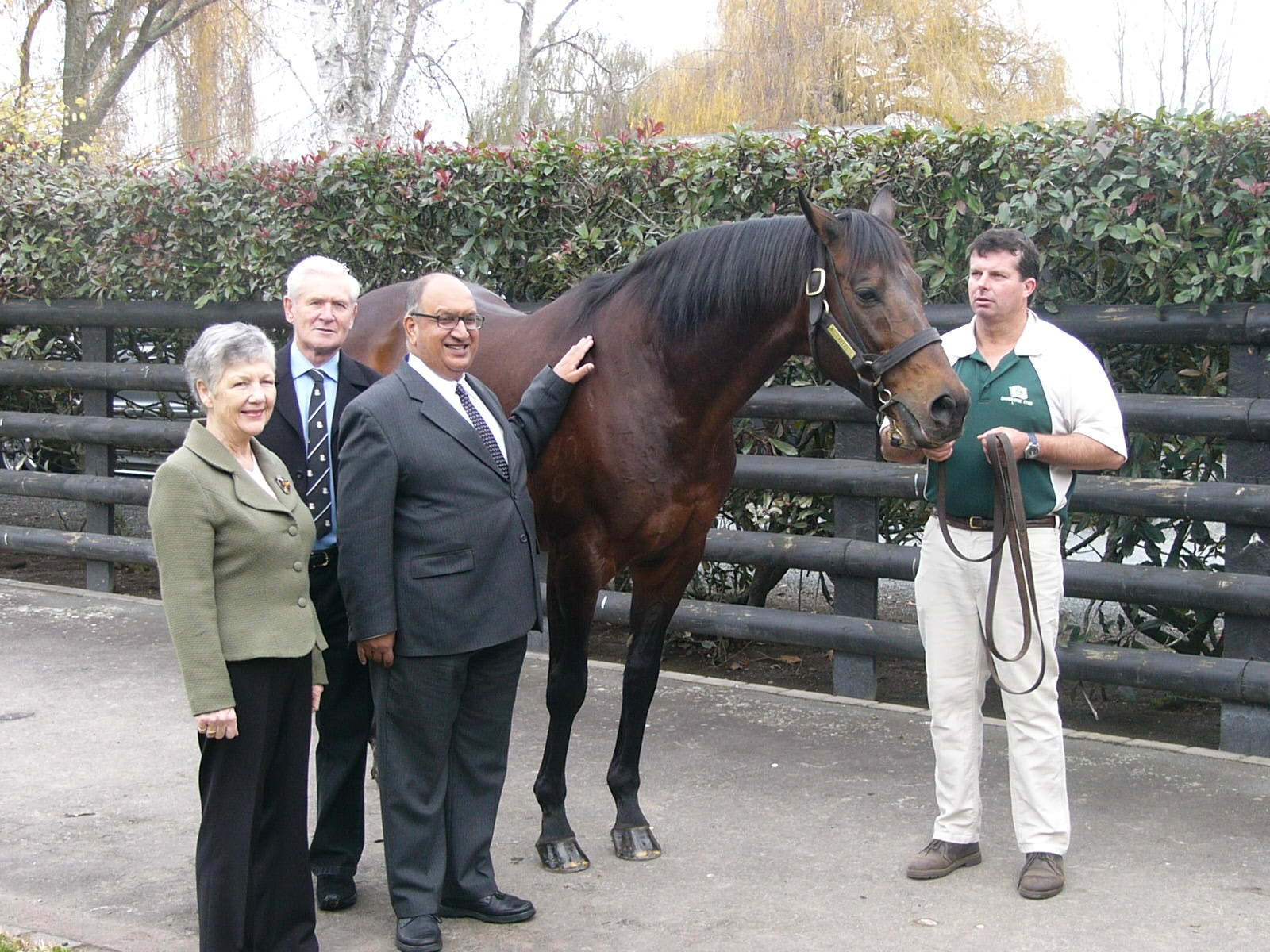
- Zabeel in 2008, during a vice-regal visit to Cambridge Stud. From left: Susan Satyanand, Sir Patrick Hogan, Anand Satyanand, and Mark Fox.
- Sire: Sir Tristram
- Grandsire: Sir Ivor
- Dam: Lady Giselle
- Damsire: Nureyev
- Sex: Stallion
- Foaled: 25 October 1986
- Country: New Zealand
- Colour: Bay
- Breeder: Cambridge Stud
- Owner: Cambridge Stud
- Trainer: Colin Hayes (at 2 & 3) & David Hayes (at 4)
- Record: 19: 7-1-4
- Earnings: A$1,138,400

Major wins
- Moonee Valley Stakes (1989); Australian Guineas (1990); Craiglee Stakes (1990)

Awards
- Leading sire in Australia (1998, 1999); Champion New Zealand sire (1998, 1999, 2000, 2001); Zabeel Classic at Ellerslie Racecourse

Honors
- New Zealand Racing Hall of Fame (2014)
- Last updated on 10 October 2010

Zabeel (25 October 1986 – 25 September 2015) was a New Zealand-bred racehorse who predominantly raced in Australia. He was retired to stud and became a champion sire. He was a bay son of Sir Tristram from the Nureyev mare Lady Giselle.

== Racing career ==
During his racing career, he won seven races, including the Moonee Valley Stakes in 1989 and the Australian Guineas, the Alister Clark Stakes, and the Craiglee Stakes in 1990.

== Stud career ==
Zabeel entered stud in 1991–2013 at Cambridge Stud New Zealand and was pensioned from stud duties in 2013. He sired 153 individual stakes winners of 350 stakes races, including Vengeance of Rain, who won the Dubai Sheema Classic and holds the earnings record in Hong Kong. Zabeel also sired the Australian champions Octagonal and Might And Power, who won 17 Group One races between them, including the Caulfield and Melbourne Cups, two Cox Plates, three runnings of the Mercedes Classic, and the Sydney three-year-old triple crown.

== Death ==
Zabeel died in his paddock at Cambridge Stud on 25 September 2015, and was buried alongside his famous sire, Sir Tristram, in the stud's garden.

== Progeny ==
Zabeel's major race winners include:

Horse	Race	Distance (m)	Prizemoney (AUD)
Octagonal	1995 Cox Plate; 1996 Australian Derby; 1997 Australian Cup; 1995 Champagne Stakes; 1996 Canterbury Guineas; 1996 Rosehill Guineas; 1996 & 1997 Mercedes Classic; 1996 Underwood Stakes; 1997 Chipping Norton Stakes	2040; 2400; 2000; 1600; 1900; 2000; 2400; 1800; 1600	$5,892,231
Vengeance of Rain	2005 Hong Kong Derby; 2005 Queen Elizabeth II Cup; 2005 Hong Kong Cup; 2007 Hong Kong Gold Cup; 2007 Dubai Sheema Classic	2000; 2000; 2000; 2000; 2400	$5,522,655
Might and Power	1997 Melbourne Cup; 1997 Caulfield Cup; 1998 Cox Plate; 1998 Mercedes Classic; 1998 Queen Elizabeth Stakes; 1998 Doomben Cup; 1998 Caulfield Stakes	3200; 2400; 2040; 2400; 2000; 2020; 2000	$5,226,286
Efficient	2006 Victoria Derby; 2007 Melbourne Cup; 2009 Turnbull Stakes	2500; 3200; 2000	$4,788,525
Sky Heights	1999 Caulfield Cup; 1999 Australian Derby; 1999 Rosehill Guineas; 2000 Caulfield Stakes	2400; 2400; 2000; 2000	$4,209,990
Railings	2005 Caulfield Cup; 2005 Metropolitan Handicap	2400; 2400	$3,172,110
Maldivian	2007 Yalumba Stakes; 2008 Cox Plate; 2009 C F Orr Stakes	2000; 2040; 1400	$2,762,550
Savabeel	2004 Spring Champion Stakes; 2004 Cox Plate	2000; 2040	$2,760,460
Zavite	2010 Auckland Cup; 2011 Ranvet Stakes	3200; 2000	$2,413,216
Jezabeel	1998 Auckland Cup; 1998 Melbourne Cup	3200	$2,024,396
Champagne	1998 Mackinnon Stakes; 1998 Storm Queen Stakes	2000; 2000	$1,942,241
Don Eduardo	2002 Australian Derby	2400	$1,685,110
Lad Of The Manor	2005 Mackinnon Stakes	2000	$1,661,150
Fiumicino	2007 Australian Derby; 2009 Mercedes Classic	2400; 2400	$1,438,725
Lights of Heaven	2011 Australasian Oaks	2000	$1,308,288
Inaflury	1998 One Thousand Guineas	1600	$1,172,535
Cronus	1997 Adelaide Cup	3200	$989,293
Dress Circle	2001 Metropolitan Handicap	2400	$940,840
Reset	2004 Australian Guineas; 2004 Futurity Stakes	1600; 1400	$850,000
Mouawad	1997 Australian Guineas; 1997 Futurity Stakes; 1997 George Ryder Stakes	1600; 1400; 1500	$775,456
Lizzie L'Amour	2017 Bonecrusher Stakes; 2018 Herbie Dyke Stakes	2000; 2000	$592,341
Zabeelionaire	2012 South Australian Derby	2500	$575,780

== Pedigree ==
Pedigree of Zabeel (NZ)
Sire Sir Tristram (Ire) 1971	Sir Ivor (USA); 1965	Sir Gaylord (USA); 1959	Turn-To (Ire)
Sire Sir Tristram (Ire) 1971	Sir Ivor (USA); 1965	Sir Gaylord (USA); 1959	Somethingroyal (USA)
Sire Sir Tristram (Ire) 1971	Sir Ivor (USA); 1965	Attica (USA); 1953	Mr.Trouble (USA)
Sire Sir Tristram (Ire) 1971	Sir Ivor (USA); 1965	Attica (USA); 1953	Athenia (USA)
Sire Sir Tristram (Ire) 1971	Isolt (USA); 1961	Round Table (USA); 1954	Princequillo (Ire)
Sire Sir Tristram (Ire) 1971	Isolt (USA); 1961	Round Table (USA); 1954	Knight's Daughter (GB)
Sire Sir Tristram (Ire) 1971	Isolt (USA); 1961	All My Eye (GB); 1954	My Babu (Fr)
Sire Sir Tristram (Ire) 1971	Isolt (USA); 1961	All My Eye (GB); 1954	All Moonshine (GB)
Dam Lady Giselle (Fr) 1982	Nureyev (USA); 1977	Northern Dancer (Can); 1961	Nearctic (Can)
Dam Lady Giselle (Fr) 1982	Nureyev (USA); 1977	Northern Dancer (Can); 1961	Natalma (USA)
Dam Lady Giselle (Fr) 1982	Nureyev (USA); 1977	Special (USA); 1969	Forli (Arg)
Dam Lady Giselle (Fr) 1982	Nureyev (USA); 1977	Special (USA); 1969	Thong (USA)
Dam Lady Giselle (Fr) 1982	Valderna (Fr); 1972	Val de Loir (Fr); 1959	Vieux Manoir (Fr)
Dam Lady Giselle (Fr) 1982	Valderna (Fr); 1972	Val de Loir (Fr); 1959	Vali (Fr)
Dam Lady Giselle (Fr) 1982	Valderna (Fr); 1972	Derna (Fr); 1961	Sunny Boy (Fr)
Dam Lady Giselle (Fr) 1982	Valderna (Fr); 1972	Derna (Fr); 1961	Miss Barberie (Fr) (Family: 16C)

One of Zabeel's half-brothers, Baryshnikov (by Kenmare), also won the Australian Guineas (in 1995) and retired to stud, while another winning half-brother, Break The Vault (by Redoute's Choice), entered stud in 2006.

== See also ==
- Thoroughbred racing in Australia
- Thoroughbred racing in New Zealand
- List of racehorses
