= N E Manion Cup =

- Class: Group 3
- Location: Rosehill Racecourse
- Inaugurated: 1972
- Race type: Thoroughbred - flat
- Sponsor: Precise Air (2026)

Race information
- Distance: 2,400 metres
- Surface: Turf
- Track: Right-handed
- Qualification: Three year old and older
- Weight: Quality handicap
- Purse: A$250,000 (2026)

The N E Manion Cup is an Australian Turf Club Group 3 Thoroughbred quality handicap horse race for three year olds and upwards over a distance of 2400 metres, held annually at Rosehill Racecourse in Sydney, Australia in March.

== History ==
The race is named in honour of N. E. Manion, former director of the Sydney Turf Club.

=== Grade ===
- 1973–1978 - Principal Race
- 1979–2005 - Group 3
- 2006–2013 - Listed Race
- 2014 onwards - Group 3

=== Distance ===
- 1973–1978 - 2000 metres
- 1979 onwards - 2400 metres

== Winners ==
The following are past winners of the race.

- 2026 - Mr Monaco
- 2025 - Alalacance
- 2024 - Post Impressionist
- 2023 - Timour
- 2022 - No Compromise
- 2021 - Favorite Moon
- 2020 - Young Rascal
- 2019 - Midterm
- 2018 - Master Of Arts
- 2017 - Big Duke
- 2016 - Libran
- 2015 - Permit
- 2014 - The Offer
- 2013 - Julienas
- 2012 - Permit
- 2011 - Bid Spotter
- 2010 - Precedence
- 2009 - Enzedex Eagle
- 2008 - The Chieftain
- 2007 - The Chieftain
- 2006 - Fooram
- 2005 - Mahtoum
- 2004 - Saturday Fever
- 2003 - Grand City
- 2002 - Manner Hill
- 2001 - Tiger's Eye
- 2000 - Pravda
- 1999 - Our Unicorn
- 1998 - Praise Indeed
- 1997 - Palos Verdes
- 1996 - Tennessee Oak
- 1995 - Super Monarch
- 1994 - Air Seattle
- 1993 - Azzaam
- 1992 - Dr Grace
- 1991 - Dr Grace
- 1990 - Lord Hybrow
- 1989 - Concordance
- 1988 - Our Palliser
- 1987 - Indian Raj
- 1986 - Marooned
- 1985 - Astrolin
- 1984 - Hawaiian Rain
- 1983 - Kaidahom
- 1982 - Sean's Pride
- 1981 - Shamrock King
- 1980 - Shahman
- 1979 - Mr. Bluebeard
- 1978 - Cold Steel
- 1977 - Rhalif
- 1976 - Paris Court
- 1975 - Sovereign Yacht
- 1974 - Gala Supreme
- 1973 - Odyssey

== See also ==
- Birthday Card Stakes
- Epona Stakes
- George Ryder Stakes
- Golden Slipper Stakes
- Ranvet Stakes
- Rosehill Guineas
- The Galaxy (ATC)
- List of Australian Group races
- Group races
