= Wenona Girl Quality =

- Class: Group 3
- Location: Randwick Racecourse, Sydney, Australia
- Inaugurated: 2006
- Race type: Thoroughbred
- Sponsor: Kia Ora (2026)

Race information
- Distance: 1,200 metres
- Surface: Turf
- Track: Right-handed
- Qualification: Mares four years old and older
- Weight: Quality handicap
- Purse: $250,000 (2026)

The Wenona Girl Quality is an Australian Turf Club Group 3 Thoroughbred quality handicap horse race, for mares aged four-years-old and upwards, over a distance of 1200 metres at Randwick Racecourse in Sydney, Australia in March.

== History ==
The race is named after champion Australian Racing Hall of Fame mare Wenona Girl, who won 27 races in the late 1950s and early 1960s. At the time of her retirement she was the highest stakes winning mare to have raced in Australia.

In 2014 the race was named after champion jockey Roy Higgins (1938–2014), who had died early in the week of the scheduled race.

=== Name ===
- 2006–2013 – Wenona Girl Quality Handicap
- 2014 – Roy Higgins Tribute Quality
- 2015–16 – Wenona Girl Handicap
- 2017 – Wenona Girl Quality

=== Grade ===
- 2006–2013 – Listed race
- 2014 onwards – Group 3

=== Venue ===
- 2006–2010 – Randwick Racecourse
- 2011 – Warwick Farm Racecourse
- 2012 – Randwick Racecourse
- 2013 – Warwick Farm Racecourse
- 2014 onwards – Randwick Racecourse

== Winners ==
The following are past winners of the race.

- 2026 - Gangsta Granny
- 2025 - Commemorative
- 2024 - Tintookie
- 2023 - Jal Lei
- 2022 – Belluci Babe
- 2021 – Vulpine
- 2020 – Fasika
- 2019 – Winter Bride
- 2018 – Sugar Bella
- 2017 – Rocket Commander
- 2016 – Savoureux
- 2015 – Griante
- 2014 – A Time For Julia
- 2013 – Arinosa
- 2012 – Rose Of Peace
- 2011 – Ofcourseican
- 2010 – Beaded
- 2009 – Belong To Many
- 2008 – Litter
- 2007 – Kakakakatie
- 2006 – Wonderer

== See also ==
- List of Australian Group races
- Group races
