= Eremein =

Australian Thoroughbred racehorse

- Sire: Timber Country
- Grandsire: Woodman
- Dam: Marrego
- Damsire: Marscay
- Sex: Gelding
- Foaled: 6 November 2001
- Died: 8 March 2020 (aged 18)
- Country: Australia
- Colour: Chestnut
- Breeder: Bhima Stud
- Owner: Geoff and Beryl White
- Trainer: Allan Denham
- Record: 27: 12-7-2
- Earnings: A$4,260,445

Major wins
- Rosehill Guineas (2005); Australian Derby (2005); Gold Coast Guineas (2005); Ranvet Stakes (2006); The BMW Stakes (2006); AJC Queen Elizabeth Stakes (2006); Chelmsford Stakes (2006); Festival Stakes (2008)

Eremein (6 November 2001 – 8 March 2020) was a notable Australian Thoroughbred racehorse. He was a chestnut gelding foaled in 2001 and bred by Bhima Stud in New South Wales. Eremein was by Timber Country (USA) from Marrego (won $78,520) by Marscay.

His best wins were the Rosehill Guineas and the Australian Derby in 2005, and the Ranvet Stakes, BMW and AJC Queen Elizabeth Stakes in 2006. Injuries and the equine influenza outbreak affected his chances to prove himself as one of the best Australian Thoroughbreds of recent years.

He had 27 starts for 12 wins, 7 seconds and 2 thirds for A$4,260,445 in prize money.
