= Birthday Card Stakes =

- Class: Group 3
- Location: Rosehill Gardens Racecourse
- Inaugurated: 1986
- Race type: Thoroughbred – Flat racing
- Sponsor: TAB (2015-26)

Race information
- Distance: 1,200 metres
- Surface: Turf
- Track: Right-handed
- Qualification: Fillies and mares three years old and older
- Weight: Quality handicap
- Purse: A$250,000 (2026)

The Birthday Card Stakes is an Australian Turf Club Group 3 Thoroughbred quality handicap horse race, for fillies and mares aged three years old and upwards, over a distance of 1200 metres, held at Rosehill Racecourse in Sydney, Australia in March.

== History ==
The race is named in honour of Birthday Card, winner of the 1962 Golden Slipper Stakes.

=== Name ===
- 1986–1991 - Birthday Card Quality Handicap
- 1992 - Clyde Kennedy Quality
- 1993–1998 - Birthday Card Quality Handicap
- 1999 - Birthday Card Stakes
- 2000–2004 - Birthday Card Quality Handicap
- 2005 - Birthday Card Stakes
- 2006 - Allied Express Stakes
- 2007–2008 - Cleanevent Stakes
- 2009 onwards - Birthday Card Stakes

=== Venue ===
- 1986–1996 - Canterbury
- 1997–1999 - Rosehill
- 2000–2002 - Canterbury
- 2003 onwards - Rosehill

=== Distance ===
- 1986–1987 - 1280 metres
- 1987–1993 - 1100 metres
- 1994 onwards - 1200 metres

=== Grade ===
- 1986–2005 - Listed race
- 2006 onwards - Group 3

== Winners ==
The following are past winners of the race.

- 2026 - Catch The Glory
- 2025 - Austmarr
- 2024 - Chain of Lightning
- 2023 - Zapateo
- 2022 - Emanate
- 2021 - Seasons
- 2020 - Miss Exfactor
- 2019 - Avantage
- 2018 - Quilista
- 2017 - Raiment
- 2016 - Sultry Feeling
- 2015 - Shamalia
- 2014 - Avoid Lightning
- 2013 - Arinosa
- 2012 - Celts
- 2011 - Zingaling
- 2010 - Patronyme
- 2009 - Gamble Me
- 2008 - Throne Inn
- 2007 - Aunty Betty
- 2006 - Imana
- 2005 - Tui Song
- 2004 - Paraca
- 2003 - Toast Of The Coast
- 2002 - Hot Riff
- 2001 - Spinning Hill
- 2000 - Verdict Declared
- 1999 - Toorak
- 1998 - All The Rave
- 1997 - Unison
- 1996 - So Keen
- 1995 - Light Up The World
- 1994 - Baldeen
- 1993 - Miss Kariba
- 1992 - River Love
- 1991 - Settlers Cove
- 1990 - Deira
- 1989 - Simple Tastes
- 1988 - Mother Duck
- 1987 - Special
- 1986 - Kisim Hiat

== See also ==
- Epona Stakes
- George Ryder Stakes
- Golden Slipper Stakes
- N E Manion Cup
- Ranvet Stakes
- Rosehill Guineas
- The Galaxy (ATC)
- List of Australian Group races
- Group races
