= Beauford (horse) =

Australian-bred Thoroughbred racehorse

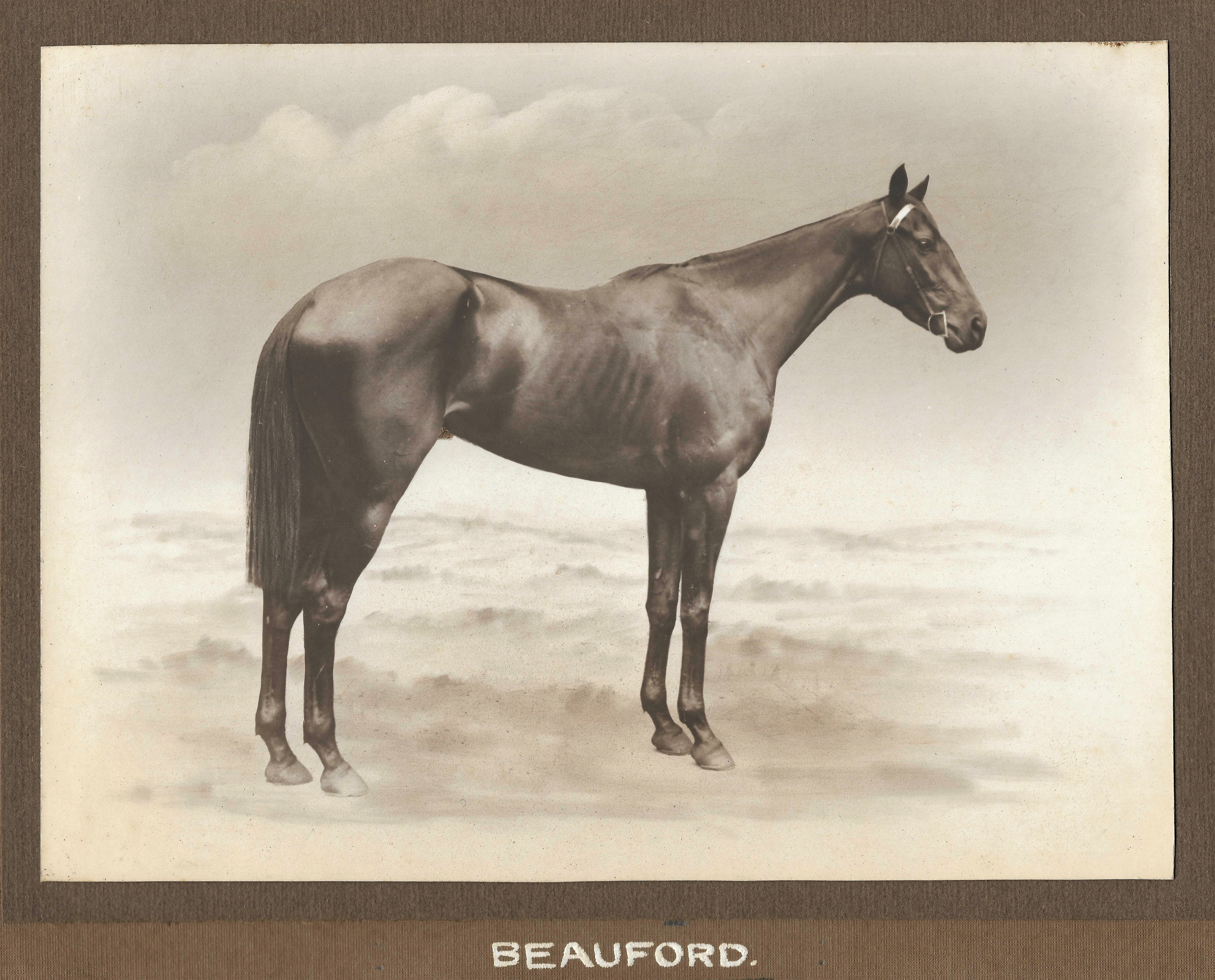
- Sire: Beau Soult (NZ)
- Grandsire: Soult (GB)
- Dam: Blueford (AUS)
- Damsire: True Blue (NZ)
- Sex: Gelding
- Foaled: 1916
- Country: Australia
- Colour: Brown
- Breeder: W.H. Mackay N.S.W.
- Owner: Sid Killick; W.H. Mackay
- Trainer: Sid Killick (and lessee)
- Record: 37: 17, 5, 3
- Earnings: £15,938

Major wins
- Tramway Handicap (1921); Hill Stakes (1921); Epsom Handicap (1921); Craven Plate (1921); Railway Handicap (1921); Rawson Stakes (1922); All Aged Stakes (1922); Chelmsford Stakes (1922); AJC Spring Stakes (1922)

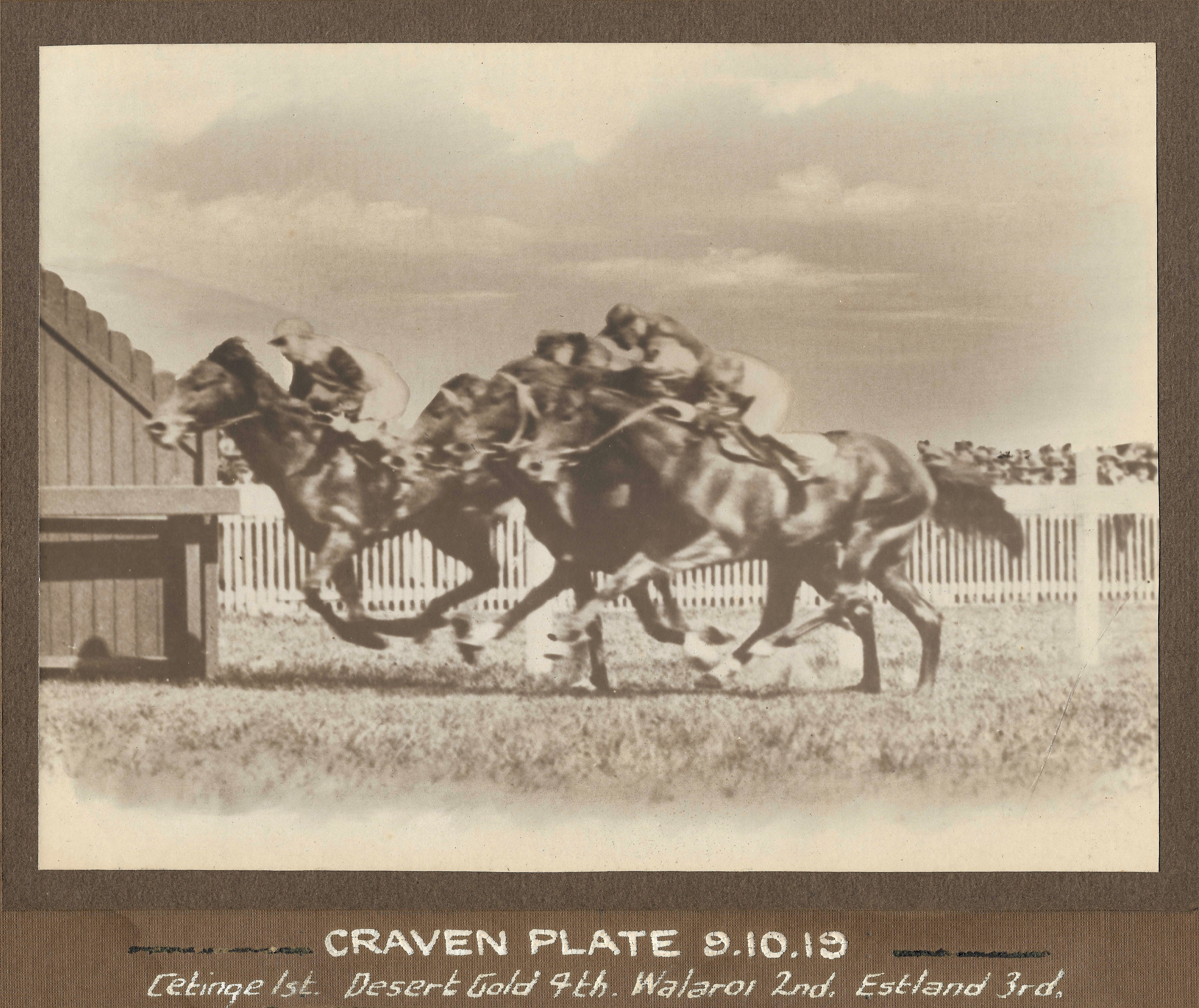
Albert Wood & Cetigne Randwick 1918

Beauford was a brown Thoroughbred gelding, performing as a racehorse in Australia. He was best known for the races against the New Zealand champion Gloaming at Randwick Racecourse in 1922. Beauford raced exclusively in N.S.W from three-year-old to nine-year-old, recording 17 wins from 6 furlongs to 1½ miles, winning 12 races with regular jockey Albert Wood.

== Breeding ==
Beauford was bred by the Mackay family at the Tinagroo stud northwest of Scone by Beau Soult (NZ), winner of the 1913 Rosehill Guineas; his dam Blueford (AUS) was unraced with all seven foals being winners. Beauford was the second foal.

Beauford's breeder, William H Mackay, born in Dungog, was a leading pastoralist having extensive interests throughout N.S.W. and Queensland. He was also director of Pitt, Son and Badgery and Royal Exchange Assurance and died in 1939, aged 81, at his Double Bay residence.

== Racing career ==
Beauford raced between 1919–1926 but did not race at 2 years and raced for seven seasons which included in the spring of 1922 the historic four successive W.F.A races over distances from 9 furlongs to 1½ miles being the Chelmsford Stakes, Hill Stakes, Spring Stakes and Craven Plate against the champion Gloaming.

As a four-year-old in 1920 Beauford improved rapidly and won the Chester Handicap and the Kensington Handicap. As a five-year-old he had a magnificent season, winning the Tramway Handicap, Hill Stakes, Craven Plate, Railway Quality (now the George Ryder Stakes) and Epsom Handicap in 1921. In 1922 he added the Rawson Stakes (now the Ranvet Stakes) and the All Aged Stakes.

The two races he won against Gloaming in 1922 were the Chelmsford Stakes and the 1½ miles Spring Stakes.

Trainer Sid Killick's stables were named 'Myra Bluan' at 32 Everton Street Hamilton, Newcastle and leased the champion Beauford for 2 years then after raced by his breeder other notable stable winners were Myra Bluan 1911 Villiers Stakes, Angelique 1913 Tatts Club Cup, Salrak 1921 Breeders' Plate and Lady Valais 1924 AJC St Leger.

Jockey Albert Wood was considered one of the best jockeys in Australia during World War I into the 1920s, originally from Freeman's Reach Windsor he built a career on success in feature races on the Australian turf with notables being Artilleryman, Cetigne, David, Beauford, Rebus, Kennaquhair, The Fortune Hunter, Richmond Main, Wolaroi, Scarlet and on retirement in 1924 was to become a successful trainer.

In 1982 The Beauford Club was established in Newcastle to honour the champion and to promote the fellowship of persons in the sport of horse racing.

Beauford's racing record: 37 starts for 17 wins, 5 seconds, 3 thirds and 12 unplaced runs.

== 1921 and 1922 racebooks ==
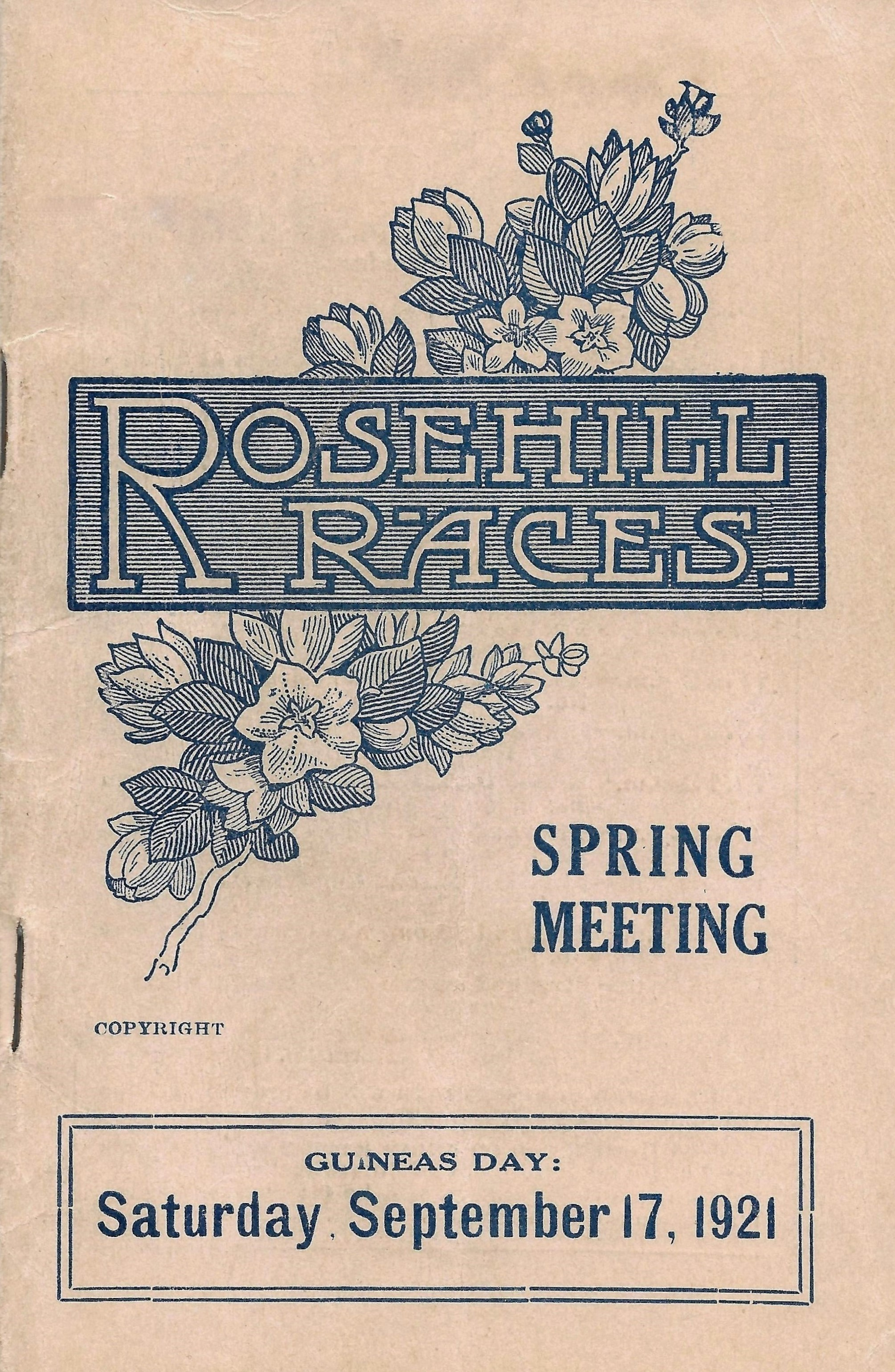
1921 RRC Hill Stakes racebook front cover

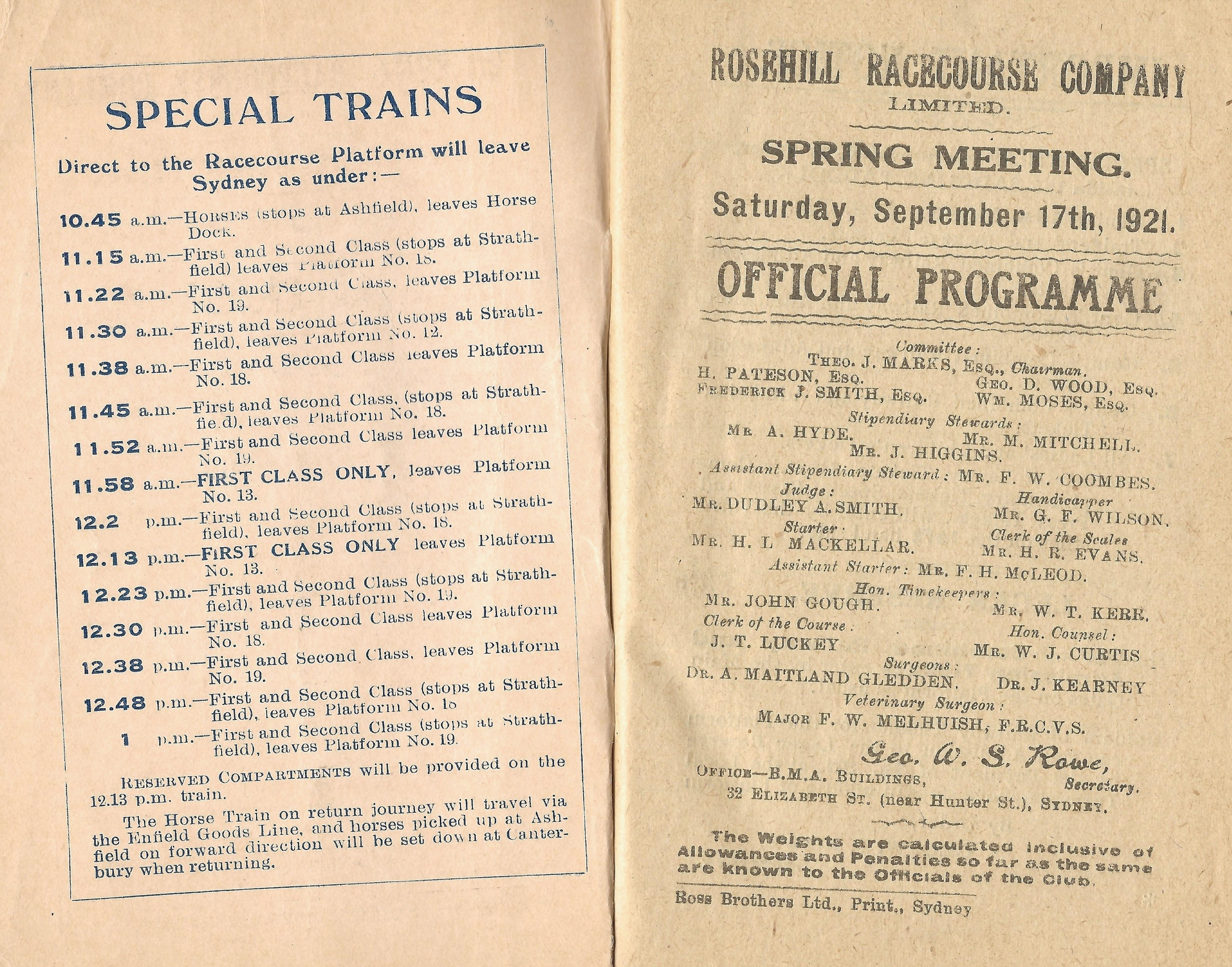
1921 RRC Hill Stakes showing officials and race day train timetable

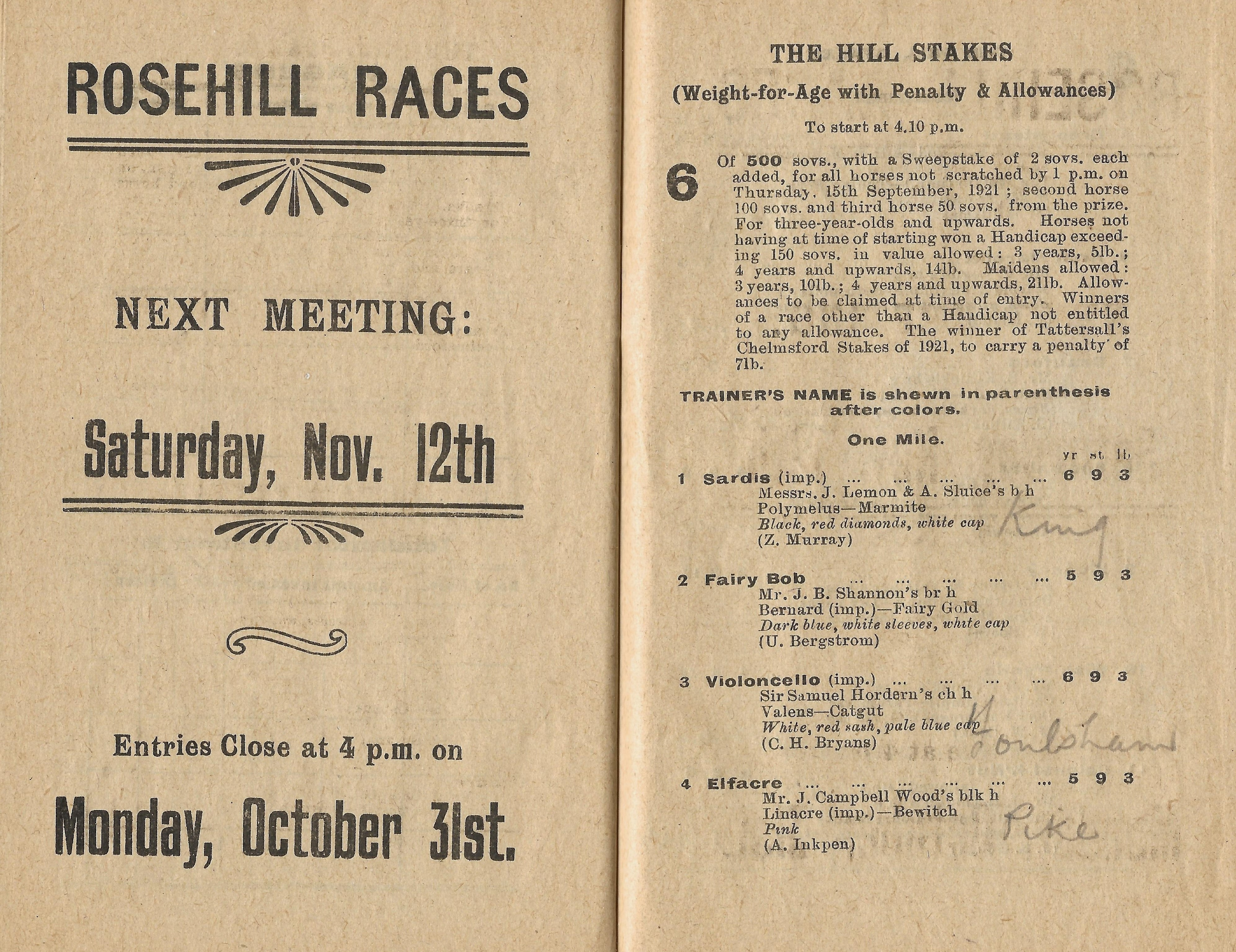
1921 RRC Hill Stakes starters and results

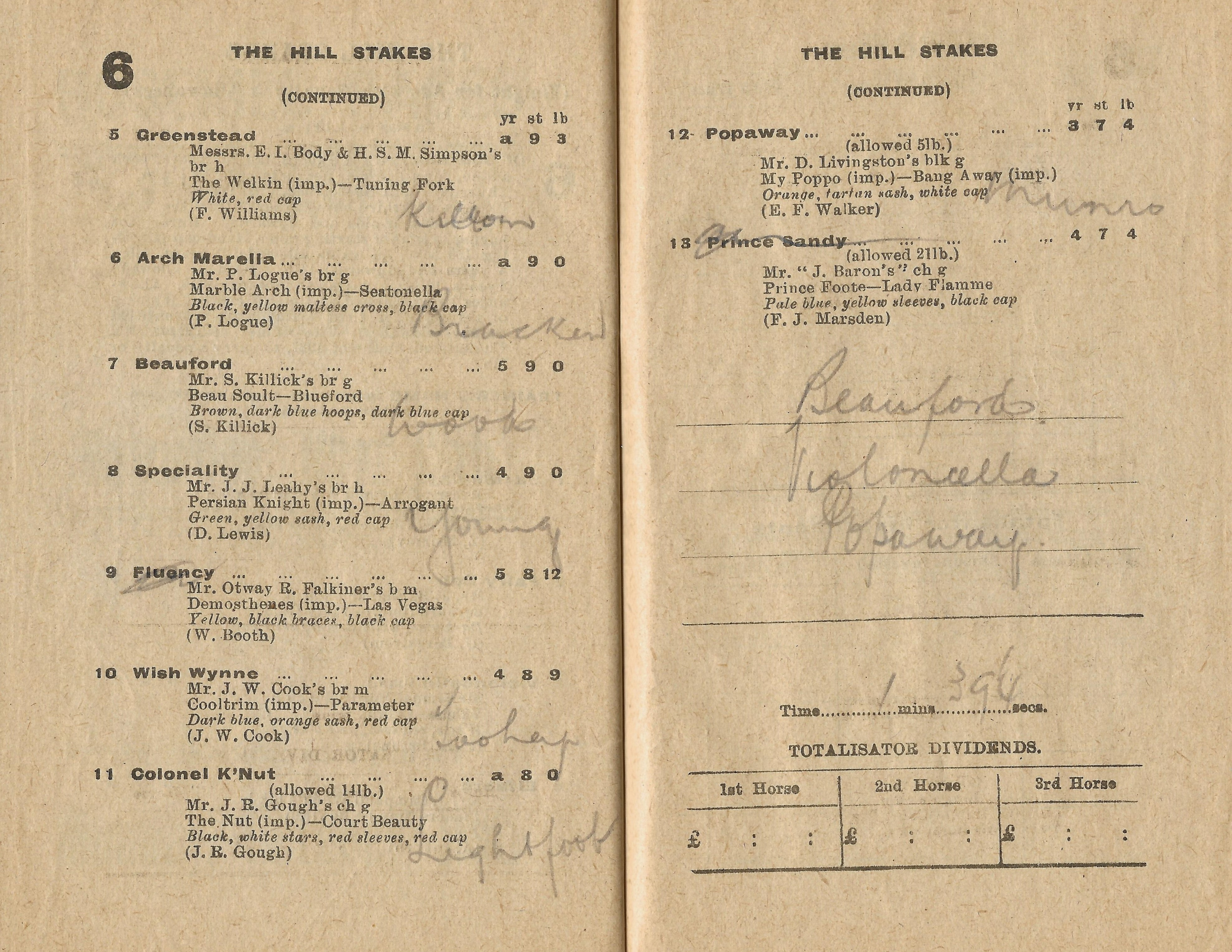
1921 RRC Hill Stakes showing the winner, Beauford

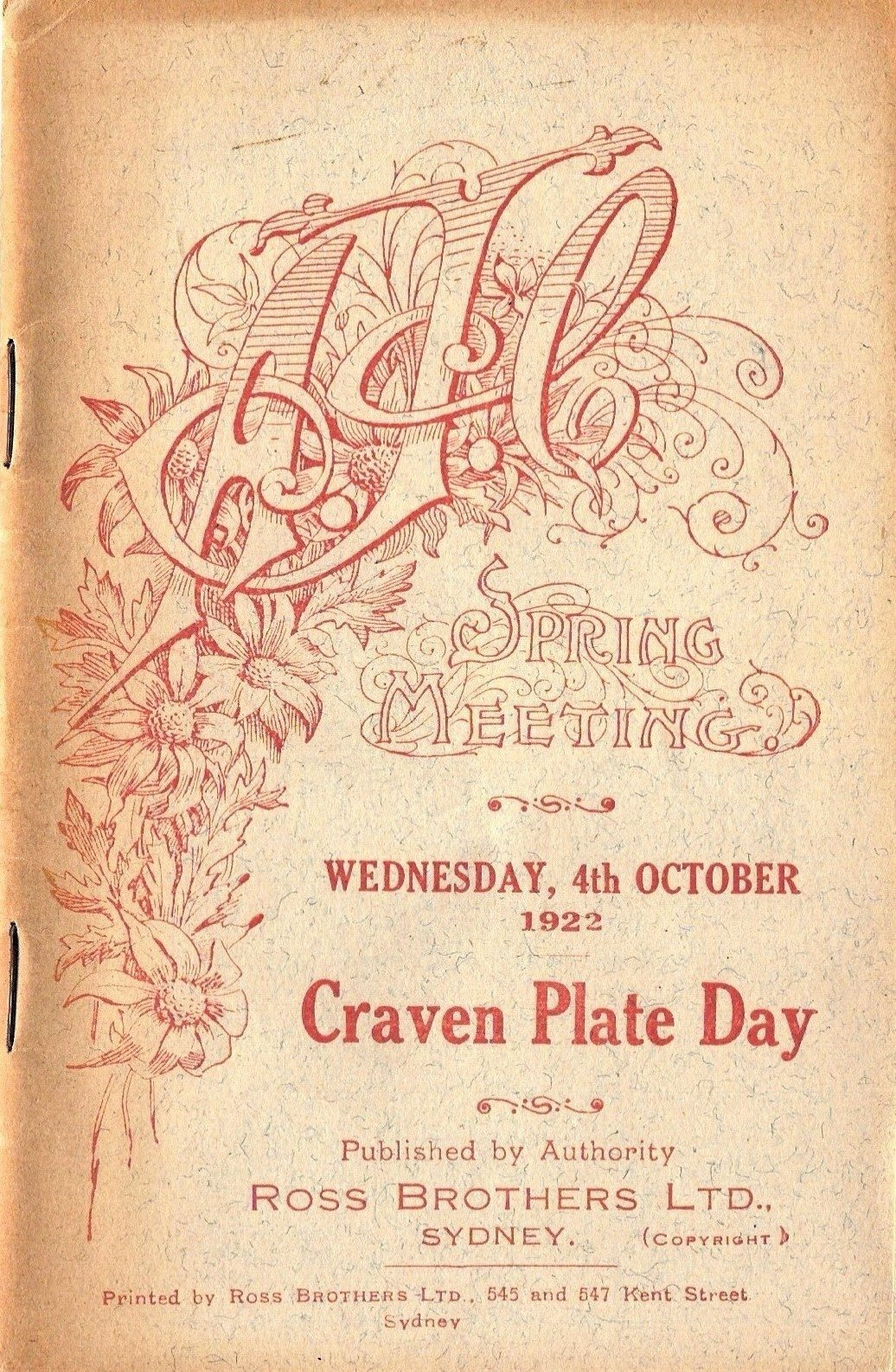
1922 AJC Craven Plate racebook front cover

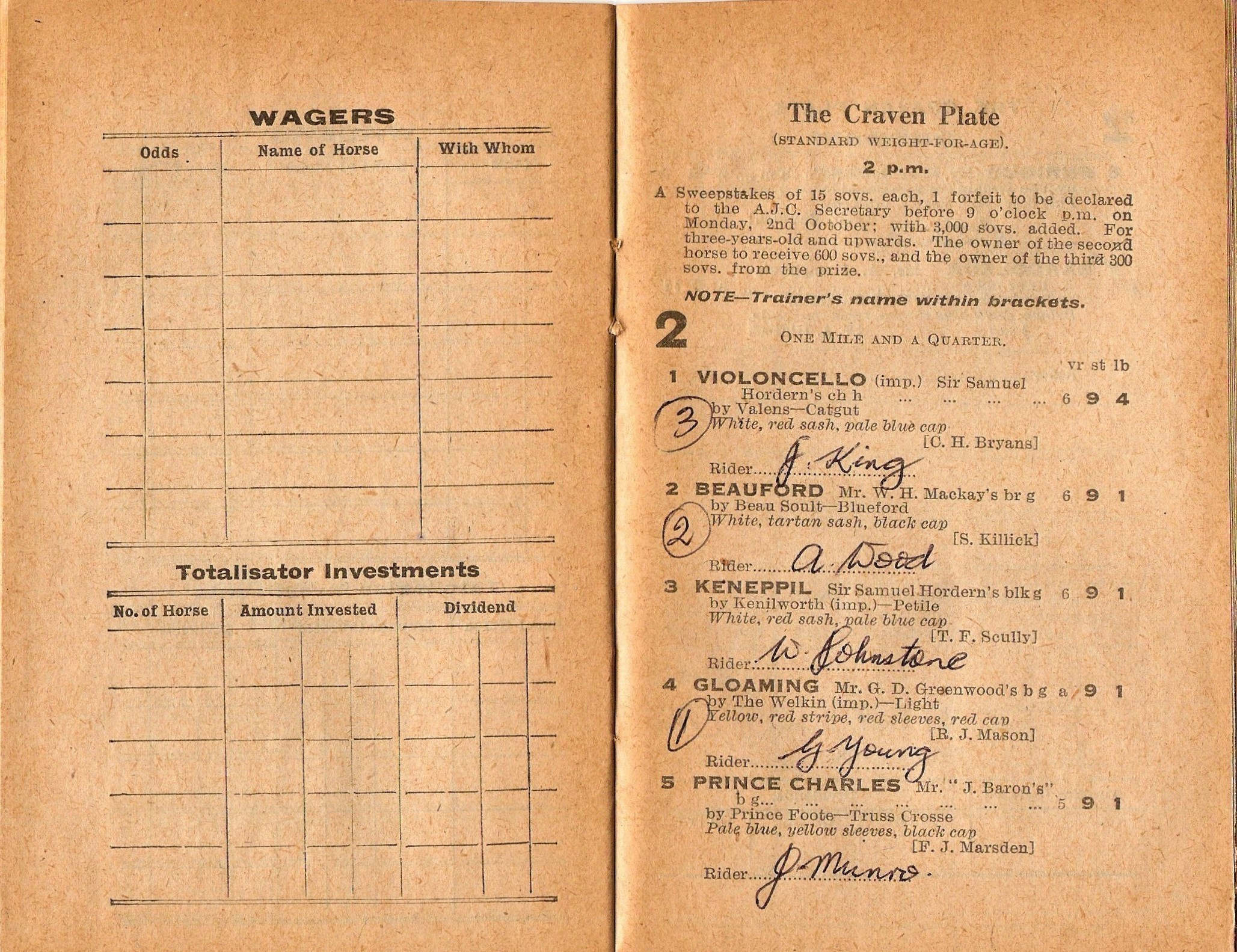
1922 AJC Craven Plate showing the winner, Gloaming

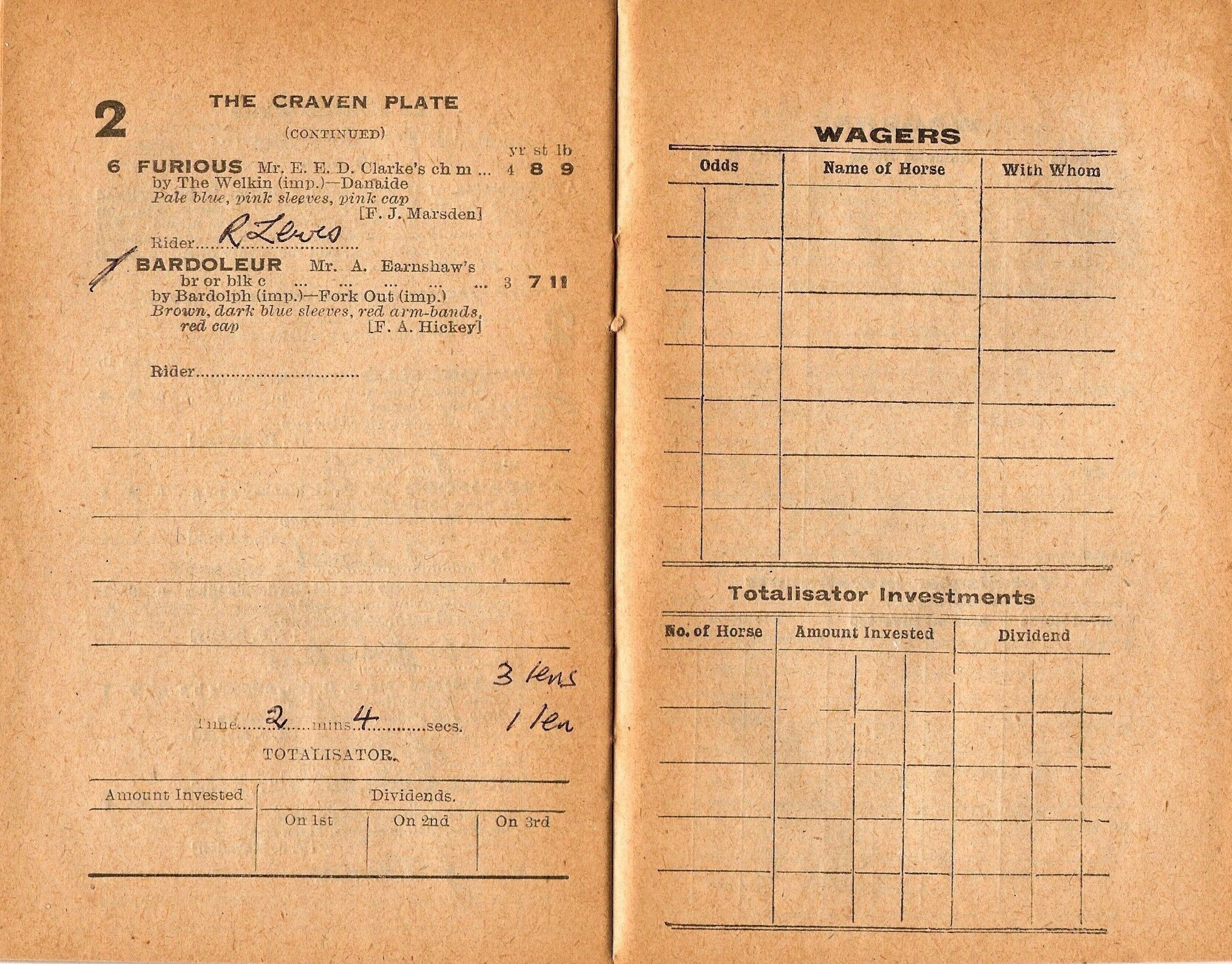
1922 AJC Craven Plate starters and results

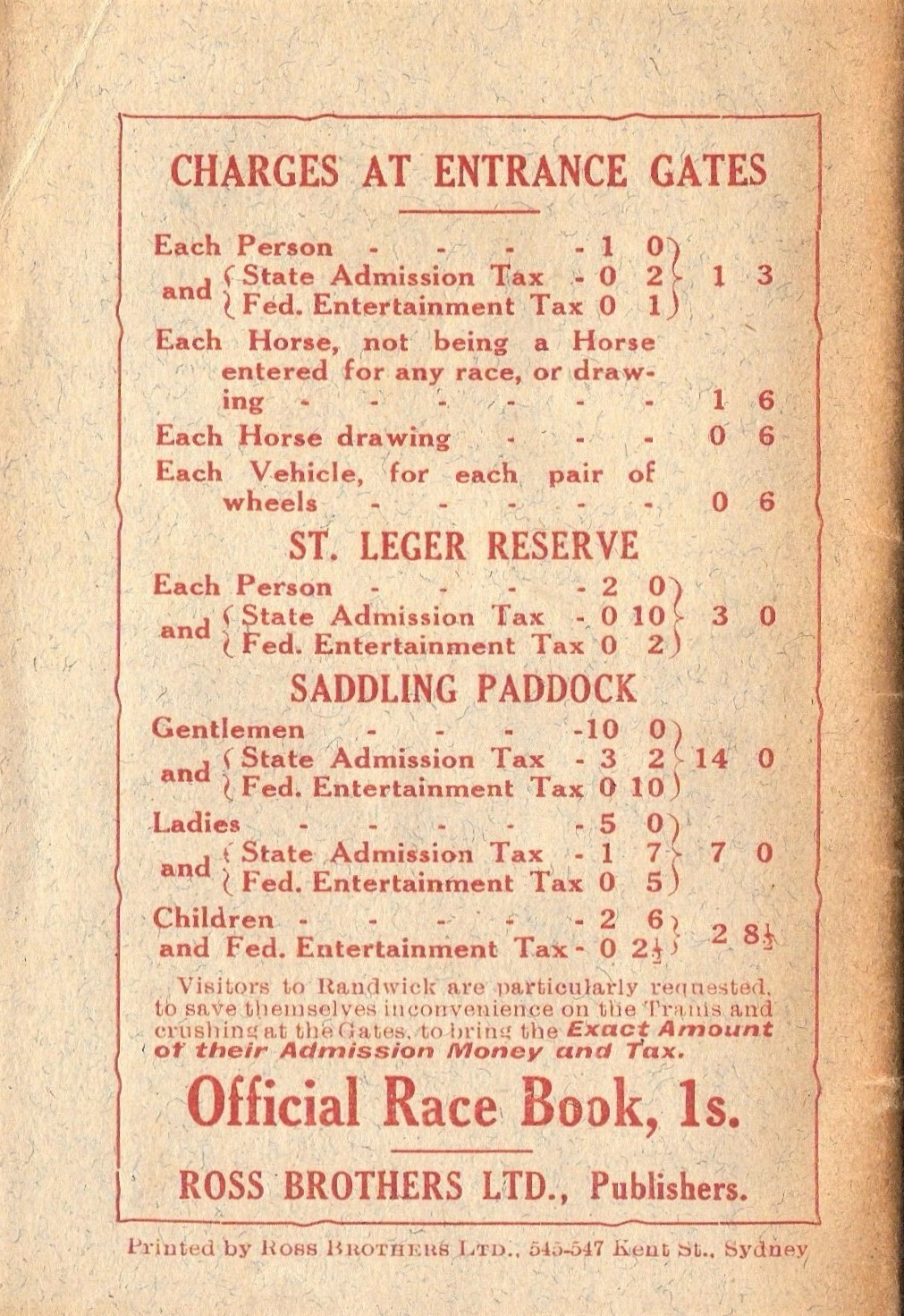
Back cover showing charges at the entrance gates
