= Wenona Girl =

Australian-bred Thoroughbred racehorse

- Sire: Wilkes (FR)
- Grandsire: Court Martial (GB)
- Dam: Golden Chariot
- Damsire: Golden Sovereign (IRE)
- Sex: Mare
- Foaled: 1957
- Country: Australia
- Colour: Chestnut
- Owner: Lloyd Foyster
- Trainer: Maurice McCarten
- Record: 68: 27-19:7
- Earnings: AU£70,825

Major wins
- VRC Sires Produce Stakes (1960); AJC Sires Produce Stakes (1960); Hobartville Stakes (1960); Rosehill Guineas (1960); Flight Stakes (1960); One Thousand Guineas (1960); Adrian Knox Oaks Stakes (1961); Rawson Stakes (1961,1964); Tramway Handicap (1961); C F Orr Stakes (1962); Challenge Stakes (1963); Futurity Stakes (1963); George Adams Handicap (1963); George Main Stakes (1963); Linlithgow Stakes (1963); Lightning Stakes (1963,1964); All Aged Stakes (1964)

Honours
- Australian Racing Hall of Fame; Wenona Girl Handicap
- Last updated on 1 July 2011

Wenona Girl (foaled 1957) was a leading Australian Thoroughbred horse racemare that had 27 wins over distances ranging from 4½ furlongs to 1½ miles. She won 22 principal races, 15 of which were later designated group one (G1) races. Wenona Girl's principal wins included the VRC Sires Produce Stakes, AJC Sires Produce Stakes, George Adams Handicap, One Thousand Guineas, VATC Futurity Stakes, AJC George Main Stakes, AJC All Aged Stakes, AJC Adrian Knox Oaks Stakes, Rawson Stakes and Rosehill Guineas, all of which were later classified as G1 races. At the time of her retirement she was the highest stakes winning mare to have raced in Australia. At stud she was a good broodmare. Wenona Girl was later inducted into the Australian Racing Hall of Fame.

== Breeding ==
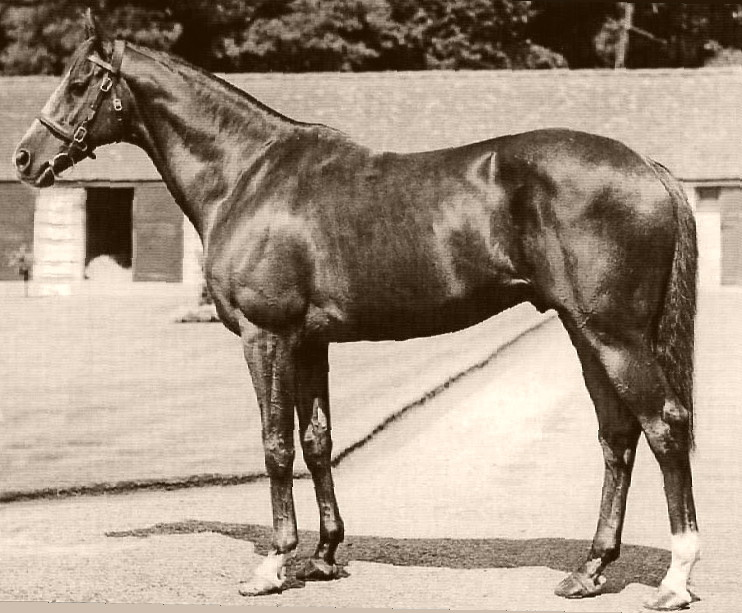
Court Martial, the grandsire of Wenona Girl

She was sired by the leading sire in Australia, Wilkes (FR), her dam was the good racemare, Golden Chariot by Golden Sovereign (IRE). Golden Chariot won the VATC One Thousand Guineas and was the dam of two other stakes-winners, Emblem and Grammar Lad both sired by Wilkes. Wenona Girl was line-bred to Teddy in the fourth generation (4m x 4f).

== Racing career ==
Wenona Girl was trained by Maurice McCarten who also trained the sprinter, Todman. McCarten won the Sydney trainers' premiership four times in succession and finished second to Tommy J. Smith ten times.

=== At two years ===
She won her first start, the 1959 AJC Gimcrack Stakes, followed by a win in the VRC Sires Produce Stakes and AJC Sires Produce Stakes. In Melbourne in the early autumn she was second (by 1½ lengths) in the Merson Cooper Stakes to Impulsive. She then returned to Sydney, finishing second (by 1½ lengths) in the Golden Slipper to Sky High and won the AJC Sires Produce Stakes from Persian Lyric and Sky High. Wenona Girl finished her two-year-old season with a tally of eight starts for 6 wins and 2 seconds.

=== At three years ===
As a three-year-old Wenona Girl won the Hobartville Stakes from Sky High and Persian Lyric, ran second (by a ½ length) in the Canterbury Guineas to Persian Lyric with Sky High third and won the Rosehill Guineas from Sky High and Persian Lyric. Wenona Girl was unplaced in the AJC Australian Derby which was won by Persian Lyric from Le Storm and Sky High. She won the Flight Stakes over 1 mile (1,600 metres) at Randwick Racecourse in Sydney. Racing in Melbourne Wenona Girl won the 1,000 Guineas from Impulsive and Lady Sybil, the Wakeful Stakes from Glimpse and Smokeview and was third behind Lady Sybil and Smokeview in the VRC Oaks.

In the autumn of 1961 Wenona Girl won the Ranvet Stakes from Persian Puzzle and the New Zealand mare, Key and then won the AJC Adrian Knox Oaks Stakes. Wenona Girl finished her three-year-old racing season with a tally of 15 starts in principal races for 7 wins, 2 seconds and 1 third.

=== At four years ===
That spring as a four-year-old mare, Wenona Girl ran second to Sky High in the Canterbury Stakes and won the Tatts Tramway Handicap. In the autumn of 1962 Wenona Girl won the C F Orr Stakes and was then second, by a half head, to New Statesman in the Oakleigh Plate. Returning to Sydney she ran second to Kilsherry with Fine and Dandy finishing third to her in the All Aged Stakes.

=== At five years ===
For the second successive year Wenona Girl ran second to Sky High in the weight for age (w.f.a.) Canterbury Stakes and followed by a third to Sky High and Tipperary Star in the (w.f.a.) Warwick Stakes. She ran third in the Tramway Handicap behind Bogan Road and Birthday Card. Wenona Girl finished to Bush Bell with Fine and Dandy third in the Theo Marks Quality Handicap, AJC Daily & Sunday Telegraph Stakes, and had another second to Rochdale, with New Statesmen third in the Epsom Handicap, and yet another second in the George Main Stakes. Wenona Girl then won the AJC Challenge Stakes before she finished second in the C F Orr Stakes to Aquanita, won the VRC Lightning Stakes from Proud Miss and Sky High; and won the VATC Futurity Stakes from Kilsherry. Back in Sydney she won AJC Malayan Racing Association Cup and the All Aged Stakes from Silver Bore.

Wenona Girl finished her three-year-old racing season with a tally of 16 starts in Melbourne and Sydney races for 4 wins, 6 seconds and 4 thirds. She was then sold by Bill Longworth to Lloyd Foyster, a thoroughbred breeder and the then owner of Gooree Stud, which he established in the early 1960s.

=== At six years ===
Wenona Girl was third in the Canterbury Stakes behind Kevejon and Sky High, second in the Warwick Stakes to Cele's Image, second in the Liston Stakes behind Nicopolis and third in the Hill Stakes behind Toi Port and Sky High. Returning to Sydney she won the (w.f.a.) George Main Stakes before going to Melbourne and winning VRC Linlithgow Stakes (now the VRC Salinger Stakes), VRC George Adams Stakes and VRC Lightning Stakes. During the autumn in Sydney Wenona Girl won the G1 races, the STC Rawson Stakes, for the second time and finally won the All Aged Stakes, with Time and Tide (Fine and Dandy¹s brother) in third place.

=== Racing summary ===
Wenona Girl had a total of 68 race starts for 27 wins (including 22 principal race wins [now known as Stakes Races]), 19 seconds and 7 thirds for earnings of AU£70,825. She defeated Sky High seven times.

== Stud record ==
Wenona Girl went to stud at Gooree Park in Mudgee. She was owned by thoroughbred breeder Lloyd Foyster, and was the dam of 7 foals, 4 raced for 3 winners including:

- Day Girl chestnut filly 1965, by Todman, Unraced, dam of Touched By Love (dam of 9 winners)
- Special Girl chestnut filly 1966 by Todman, 8 wins 5 to 7 f. and $21,075
- Star Studded chestnut filly 1967 by Star Kingdom, a Sydney winner and dam of Star Bolt (10 wins 1,200 to 2,000 m. and $53,180)
- Gooree Girl chestnut filly 1970 by Todman, unraced
- Condagain (also known as Incorrigible) bay or brown colt 1974 by Convamore (IRE)
- St. Claude brown colt 1973 by Convamore (IRE)
- Pilmuir (NZ) (1978), dam of Kinjite (NZ) winner of AJC Epsom Handicap and $2.2 million in stakes, sire of 9 stakes-winners.

== Honours ==
The 1,200 metre Group 3 the Wenona Girl Handicap contested at Randwick Racecourse is named in her honour. Wenona Girl was inducted into the Australian Racing Hall of Fame in 2008.

== See also ==
- List of leading Thoroughbred racehorses
