= Ranvet Stakes =

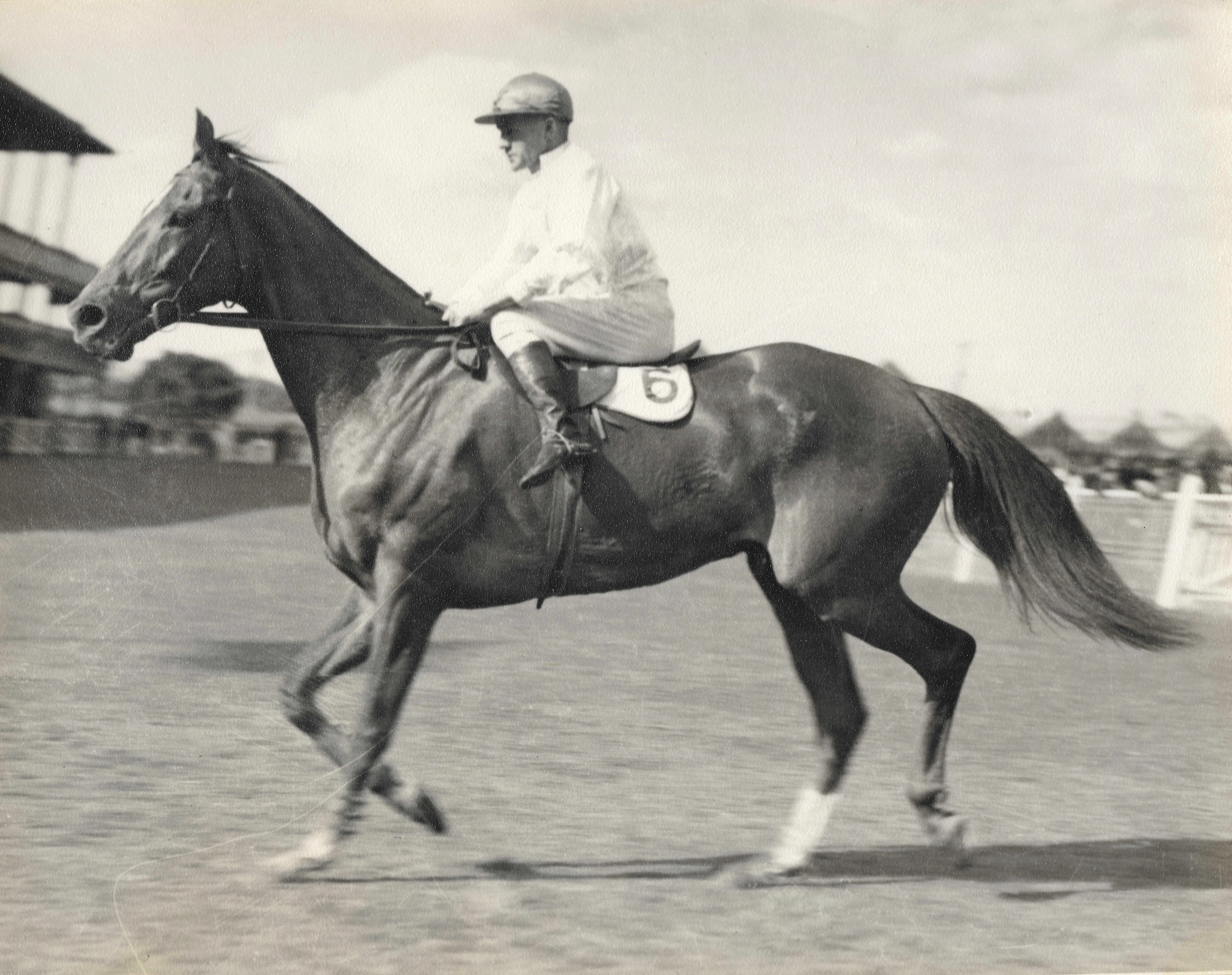
- Lough Neagh, 1933, 1936, 1937 winner
- Class: Group 1
- Location: Rosehill Gardens Racecourse
- Inaugurated: 1903 (as Rawson Stakes)
- Race type: Thoroughbred
- Sponsor: Ranvet (since 1991)

Race information
- Distance: 2,000 metres
- Surface: Turf
- Qualification: Three year olds and over
- Weight: Weight for Age
- Purse: $1,000,000 (2025)
- Bonuses: Exempt from ballot in The BMW, the Queen Elizabeth Stakes and Sydney Cup

The Ranvet Stakes is an Australian Turf Club Group 1 Weight for Age Thoroughbred horse race for three-year-olds and older over a distance of 2,000 metres, held at Rosehill Gardens Racecourse in Sydney, Australia in March.

== History ==
The original name of the race was named after Sir Harry Holdsworth Rawson, who was Governor of New South Wales from 27 May 1902 to 27 May 1909.

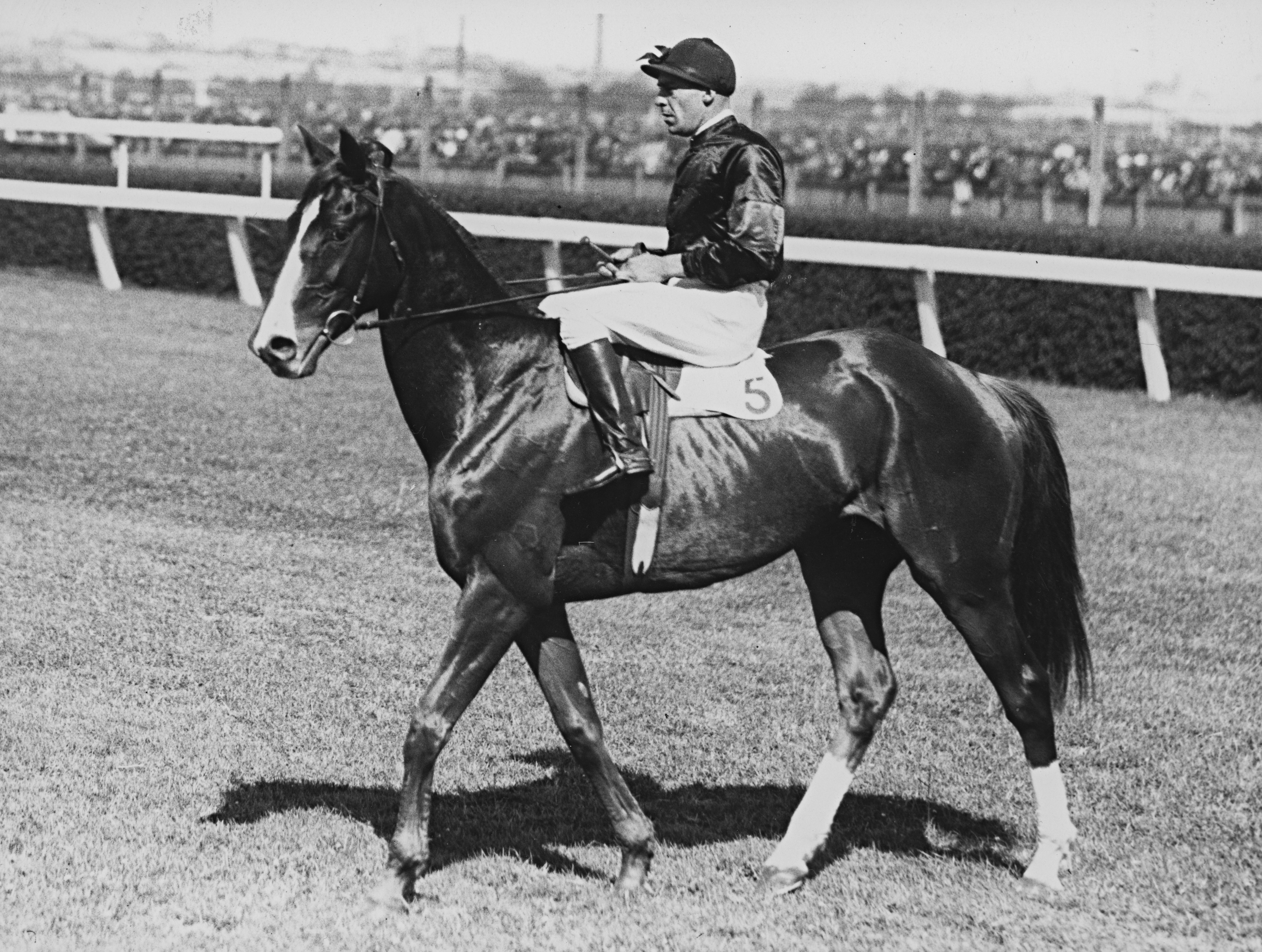
Rogilla, 1934 winner

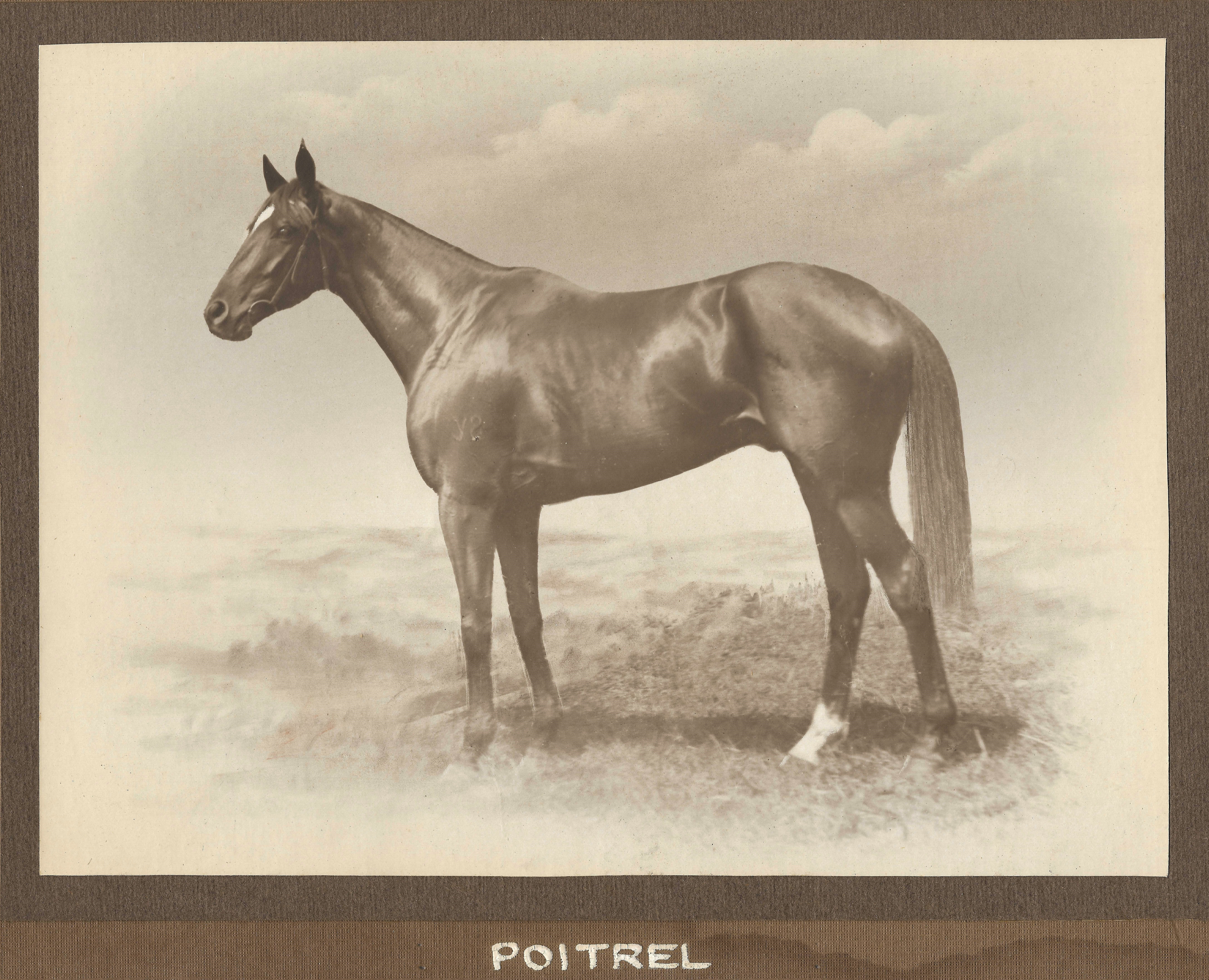
Poitrel, 1921 dead heat winner

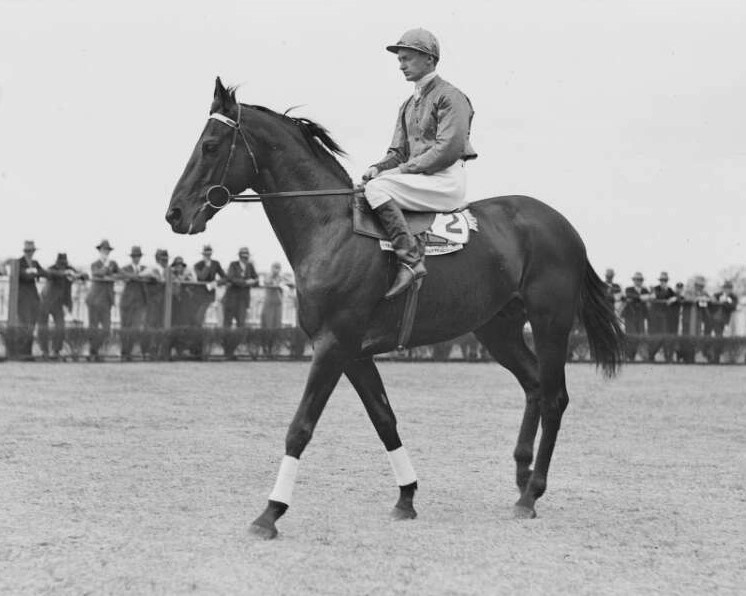
Nightmarch, 1930 winner

Since 1991 the event has been named after the sponsor Ranvet, a supplier of equine nutrition, supplements and veterinary medications.

=== Name ===
- 1903–1987 - Rawson Stakes
- 1988–1990 - Segenhoe Stakes
- 1991 onwards - Ranvet Stakes

=== Distance ===
- 1903–1954 - 1 1/8 miles (~1800 metres)
- 1955 - 1 1/4 miles (~2000 metres)
- 1956–1962 - 1 1/8 miles (~1800 metres)
- 1963–1972 - 7 1/2 furlongs (~1500 metres)
- 1973–1978 – 1750 metres
- 1979–2007 – 2000 metres
- 2008 – 1900 metres (held at Canterbury)
- 2009–2016 – 2000 metres

=== Grade ===
- 1903–1979 - Principal race
- 1980 onwards - Group 1

=== Recent multiple winners ===
Jockeys

- James McDonald (2015, 2021, 2024, 2025, 2026)
- Kerrin McEvoy (2016, 2017, 2019)
- Nash Rawiller (2009, 2010, 2014).

Trainers

- Chris Waller (2013, 2021, 2024, 2025, 2026)
- Guy Walter (2000, 2001, 2003).
- Gai Waterhouse (2005, 2007, 2008, 2009, 2010)

=== Gallery of noted winners ===
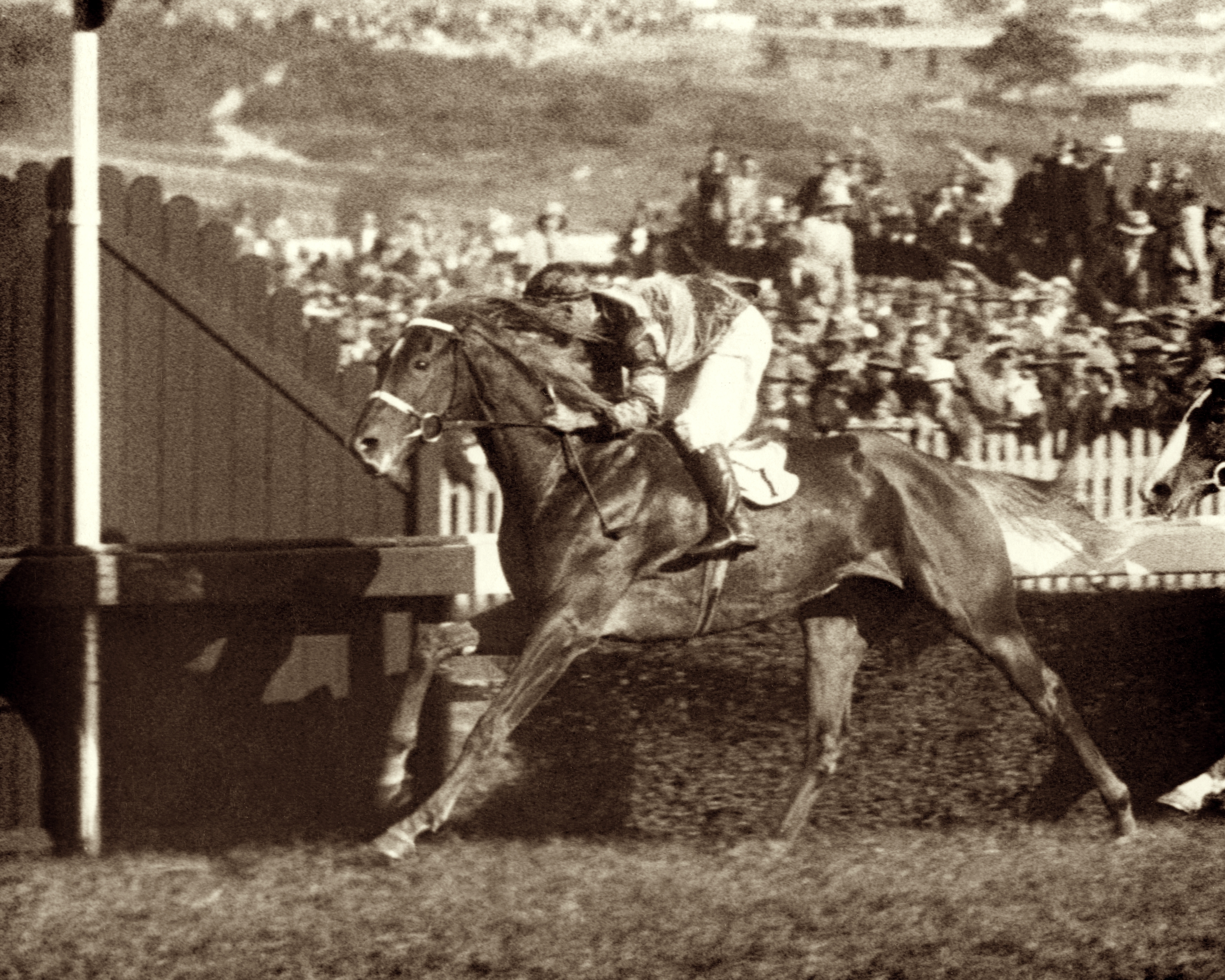
Peter Pan, 1935 winner

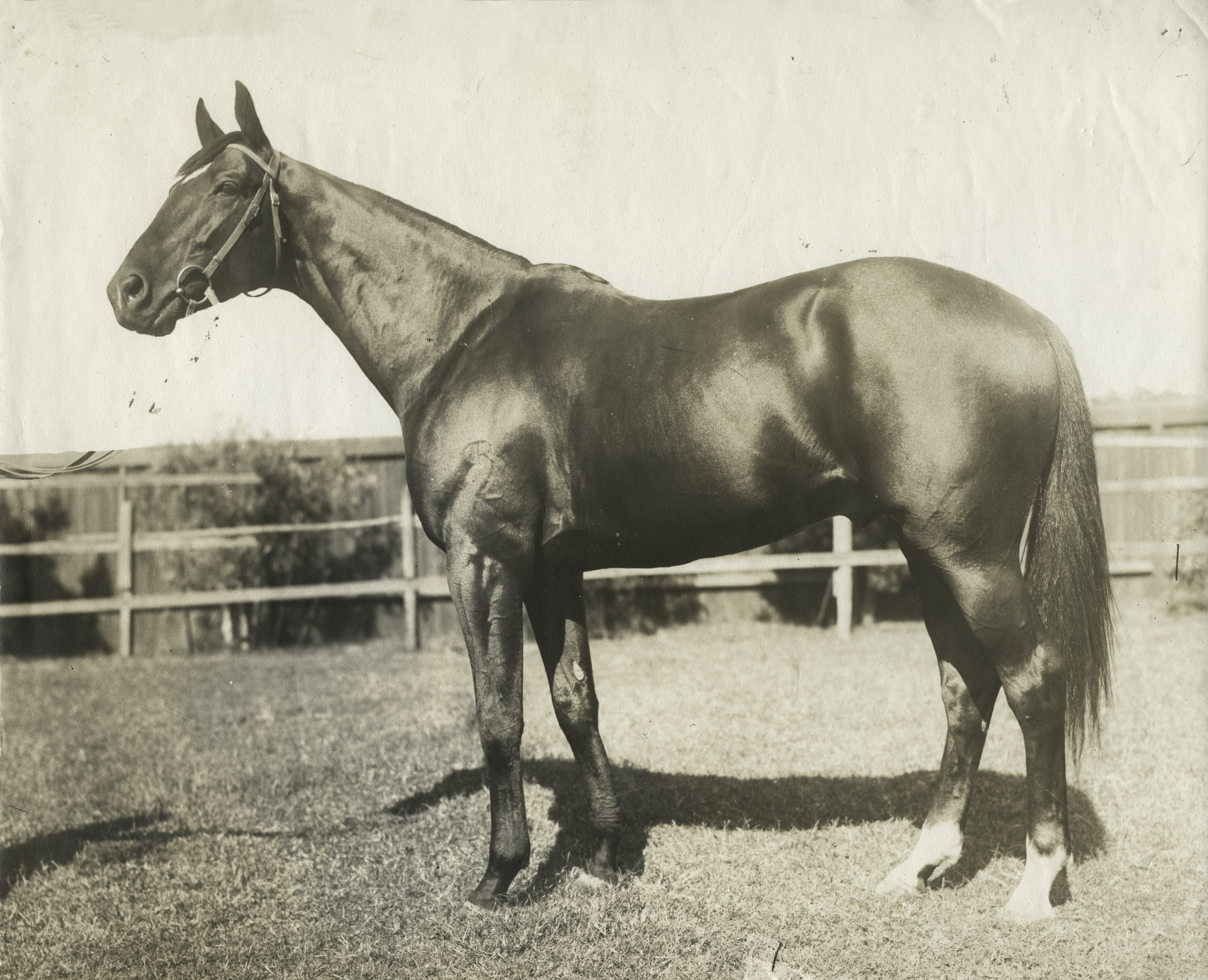
Poseidon, 1908 winner

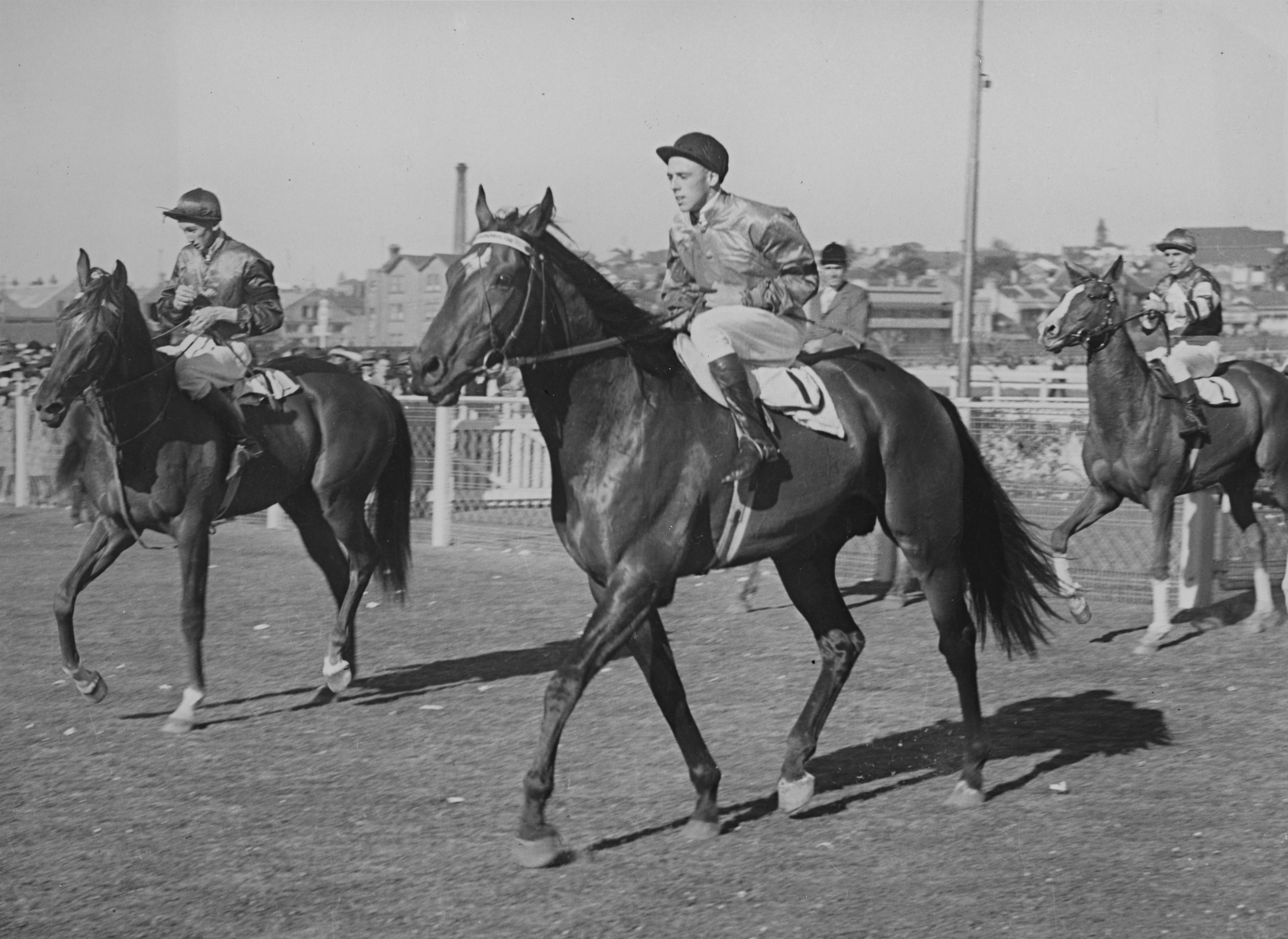
Bernborough, 1946 winner

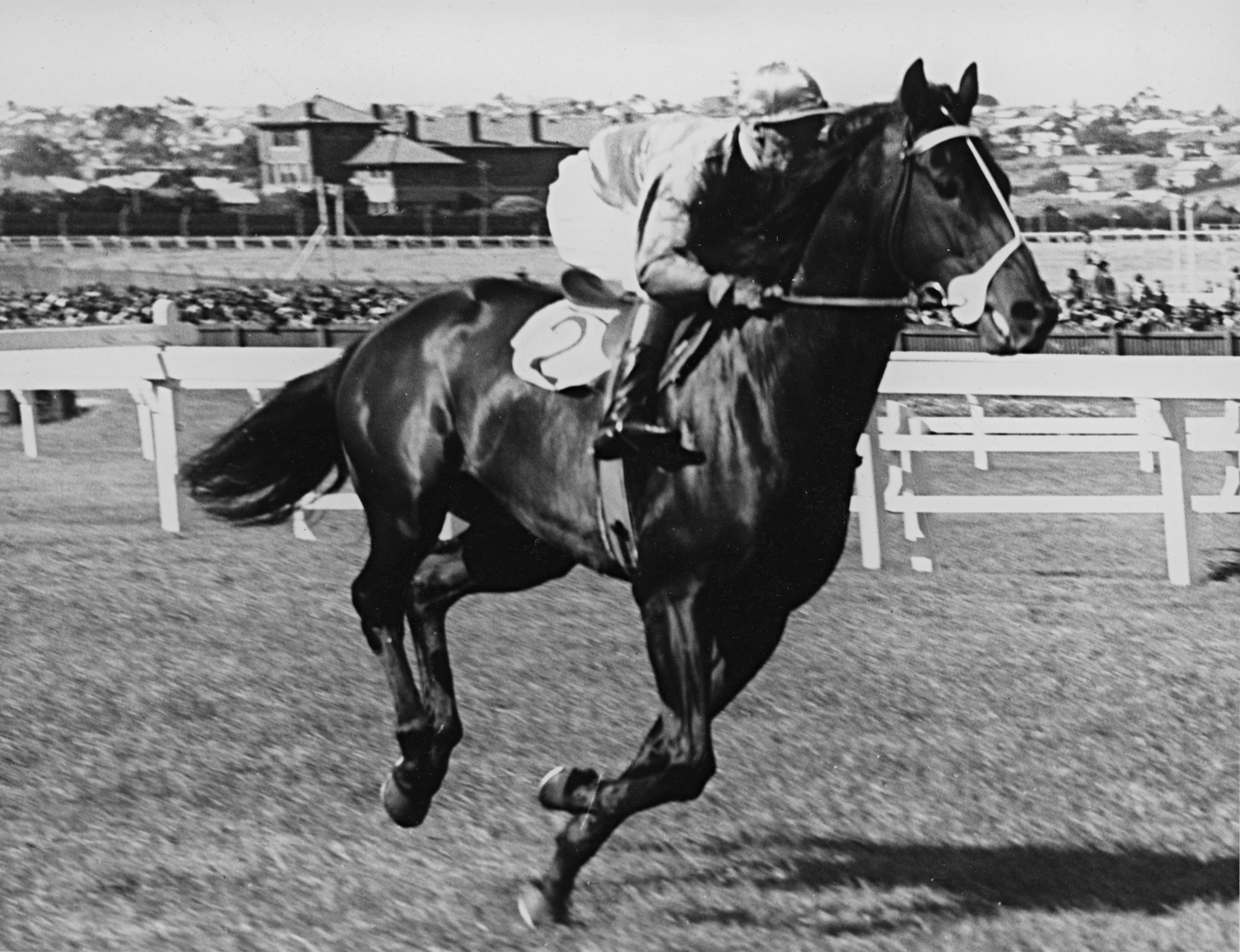
Beau Vite, 1941 winner

== Winners ==
The following are past winners of the race.

- 2026 - Aeliana
- 2025 - Via Sistina
- 2024 - Via Sistina
- 2023 - Dubai Honour
- 2022 - Montefilia
- 2021 - Verry Elleegant
- 2020 - Addeybb
- 2019 - Avilius
- 2018 - Gailo Chop
- 2017 - Our Ivanhowe
- 2016 - The United States
- 2015 - Contributor
- 2014 - Silent Achiever
- 2013 - Foreteller
- 2012 - Manighar
- 2011 - Zavite
- 2010 - Theseo
- 2009 - Theseo
- 2008 - Tuesday Joy
- 2007 - Desert War
- 2006 - Eremein
- 2005 - Grand Armee
- 2004 - Sound Action
- 2003 - Republic Lass
- 2002 - Universal Prince
- 2001 - Tie the Knot
- 2000 - Tie the Knot
- 1999 - Darazari
- 1998 - Gold Guru
- 1997 - Arkady
- 1996 - Electronic
- 1995 - Stony Bay
- 1994 - Dark Ksar
- 1993 - Veandercross
- 1992 - My Eagle Eye
- 1991 - Super Impose
- 1990 - Better Loosen Up
- 1989 - Beau Zam
- 1988 - Beau Zam
- 1987 - Myocard
- 1986 - Late Show
- 1985 - Alibhai
- 1984 - Mr. McGinty
- 1983 - Dalmacia
- 1982 - Allez Bijou
- 1981 - Hyperno
- 1980 - Minuetto
- 1979 - Marceau
- 1978 - Marceau
- 1977 - Purple Patch
- 1976 - Balmerino
- 1975 - Passetreul
- 1974 - Bankrupt
- 1973 - Gunsynd
- 1972 - Regal Rhythm
- 1971 - Gunsynd
- 1970 - Broker's Tip
- 1969 - Foresight
- 1968 - Regal Rhythm
- 1967 - Striking Force
- 1966 - Even Better
- 1965 - Time And Tide
- 1964 - Wenona Girl
- 1963 - Sky High
- 1962 - Sky High
- 1961 - Wenona Girl
- 1960 - Bardshah
- 1959 - Bold Pilot
- 1958 - Tulloch
- 1957 - Redcraze
- 1956 - Arlunya
- 1955 - Prince Morvi
- 1954 - Gallant Archer
- 1953 - Tarien
- 1952 - Forest Beau
- 1951 - Grey Boots
- 1950 - Dickens
- 1949 - Vagabond
- 1948 - Columnist
- 1947 - Columnist
- 1946 - Bernborough
- 1945 - Veiled Threat
- 1944 - Falcon Knight
- 1943 - Katanga
- 1942 - race not held
- 1941 - Beau Vite
- 1940 - Dashing Cavalier
- 1939 - Spear Chief
- 1938 - Sarcherie
- 1937 - Lough Neagh
- 1936 - Lough Neagh
- 1935 - Peter Pan
- 1934 - Rogilla
- 1933 - Lough Neagh
- 1932 - Ammon Ra
- 1931 - Waterline
- 1930 - Nightmarch
- 1929 - Winalot
- 1928 - Limerick
- 1927 - Limerick
- 1926 - Valicare
- 1925 - The Hawk
- 1924 - Whittier
- 1923 - Furious
- 1922 - Beauford
- 1921 - †Richmond Main / Poitrel
- 1920 - Artilleryman
- 1919 - Wolaroi
- 1918 - Westcourt
- 1917 - Giru
- 1916 - Cetigne
- 1915 - Cisco
- 1914 - Popinjay
- 1913 - race not held
- 1912 - Malt King
- 1911 - Malt King
- 1910 - Bobrikoff
- 1909 - Maltine
- 1908 - Poseidon
- 1907 - Garches
- 1906 - Marvel Loch
- 1905 - Ibex
- 1904 - Air Motor
- 1903 - Great Scot

† Dead heat

== See also ==
- Birthday Card Stakes
- Epona Stakes
- George Ryder Stakes
- N E Manion Cup
- Golden Slipper Stakes
- Rosehill Guineas
- The Galaxy (ATC)
- List of Australian Group races
- Group races
