= Epona Stakes =

- Class: Group 3
- Location: Rosehill Gardens Racecourse
- Inaugurated: 1986
- Race type: Thoroughbred – Flat racing
- Sponsor: Bisley Workwear (2022-26)

Race information
- Distance: 1,900 metres
- Surface: Turf
- Track: Right-handed
- Qualification: Fillies and mares three years old and older
- Weight: Set weights with penalties
- Purse: A$250,000 (2026)

The Epona Stakes is an Australian Turf Club Group 3 Thoroughbred horse race, for fillies and mares aged three years old and upwards, over a distance of 1900 metres, with set weights and penalties, held annually at Rosehill Racecourse in Sydney, Australia in March.

== History ==
The race has its origins as an undercard race for the Golden Slipper Stakes race meeting at Rosehill in 1998. The name changed to the Epona Mares Quality Plate the following year, named after the Celtic-Roman god for the protector of horses, Epona. By 2001 the race became registered and a black type race as the Epona Stakes. In 2012 the race was upgraded to Group 3.

=== Name ===
- 1998 - Mares Plate
- 1999–2000 - Epona Mares Quality Plate
- 2001 - Epona Mares Quality Stakes
- 2002 - The Brookvale Hotel Stakes
- 2003–2004 - Berjani Jewellers Stakes
- 2005–2006 - Epona Stakes
- 2007–2011 - De Bortoli Wines Stakes
- 2012–2013 - Epona Stakes
- 2014 - Percy Sykes Tribute Stakes
- 2015 onwards - Epona Stakes

=== Venue ===
- 1998–1999 - Rosehill
- 2000–2002 - Canterbury
- 2003 onwards - Rosehill

=== Distance ===
- 1998–1999 – 2000 metres
- 2000 onwards - 1900 metres

=== Grade ===
- 1998–2000 - unlisted
- 2001–2011 - Listed race
- 2012 onwards - Group 3

== Winners ==
The following are past winners of the race.

- 2026 - Machine Gun Gracie
- 2025 - Mare Of Mt Butler
- 2024 - Osmose
- 2023 - Gin Martini
- 2022 - Monegal
- 2021 - Polly Grey
- 2020 - Missybeel
- 2019 - Semari
- 2018 - The Pinnacle
- 2017 - Consommateur
- 2016 - Vergara
- 2015 - Scratchy Bottom
- 2014 - Intimate Moment
- 2013 - Aliyana Tilde
- 2012 - Fibrillation
- 2011 - Galizani
- 2010 - Messenger
- 2009 - Divine Rebel
- 2008 - Ready To Lift
- 2007 - Safwa
- 2006 - Kosi Bay
- 2005 - Natural Woman
- 2004 - Great Anna
- 2003 - Airlie Bird
- 2002 - Ilze
- 2001 – Market Price
- 2000 - Our Erin
- 1999 - Zastov
- 1998 - Burning Embers

== See also ==
- Birthday Card Stakes
- George Ryder Stakes
- Golden Slipper Stakes
- N E Manion Cup
- Ranvet Stakes
- Rosehill Guineas
- The Galaxy (ATC)
- List of Australian Group races
- Group races
