= Rosehill Guineas =

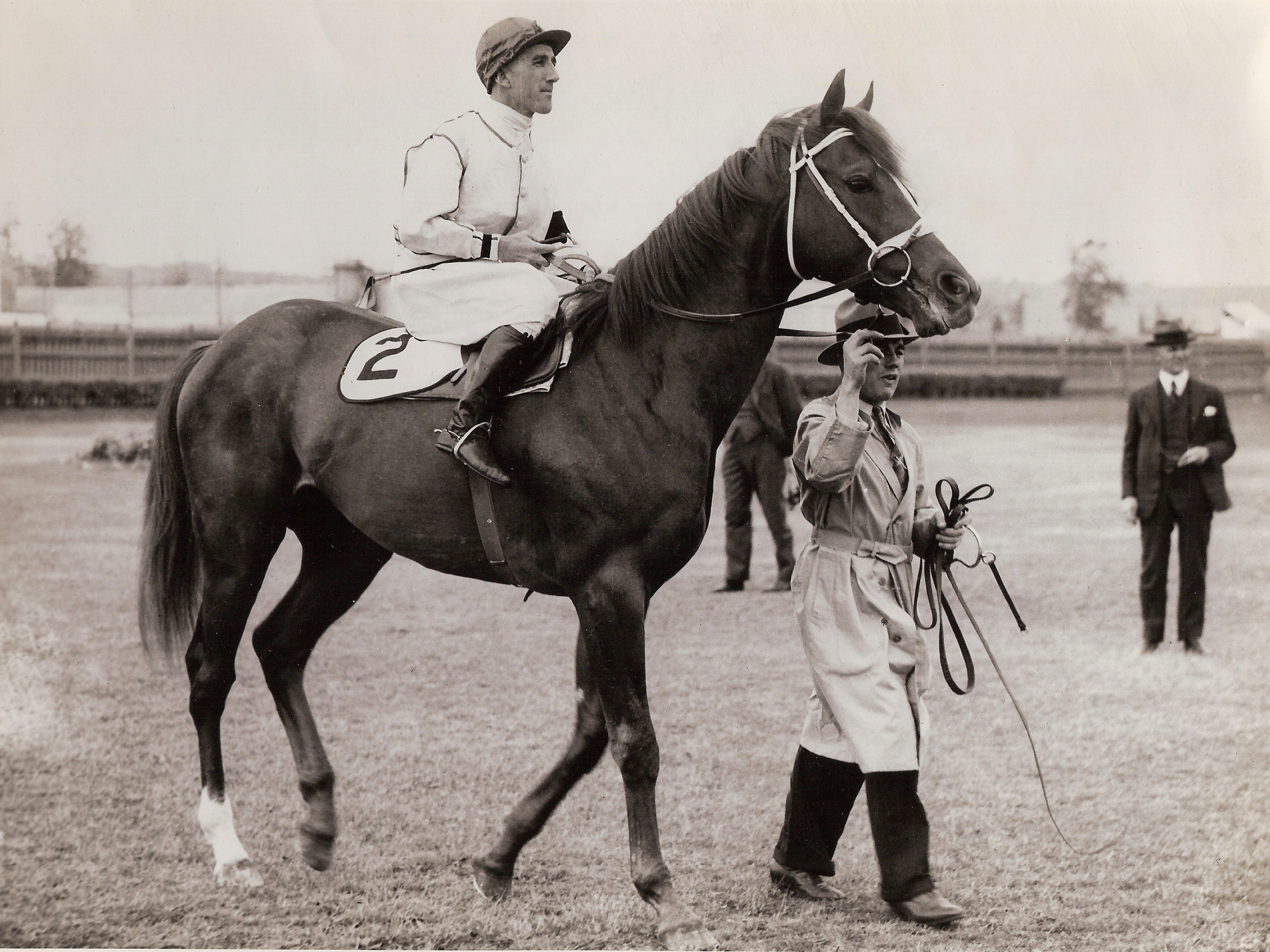
- Ajax, 1937 winner
- Class: Group 1
- Location: Rosehill Gardens Racecourse; Sydney, New South Wales, Australia
- Inaugurated: 1910
- Race type: Thoroughbred – Flat racing
- Sponsor: Sky Racing (2015-26)

Race information
- Distance: 2,000 metres
- Surface: Turf
- Track: Right-handed
- Qualification: Three-year-olds
- Weight: Set weights colts and geldings - 56 1/2 kg fillies 54 1/2 kg
- Purse: AUD$750,000 (2026)
- Bonuses: Exempt from ballot in Australian Derby

The Rosehill Guineas is an Australian Turf Club Group One Thoroughbred horse race for three-year-olds at set weights run over a distance of 2000 metres at Rosehill Gardens Racecourse in Sydney, Australia annually in March.

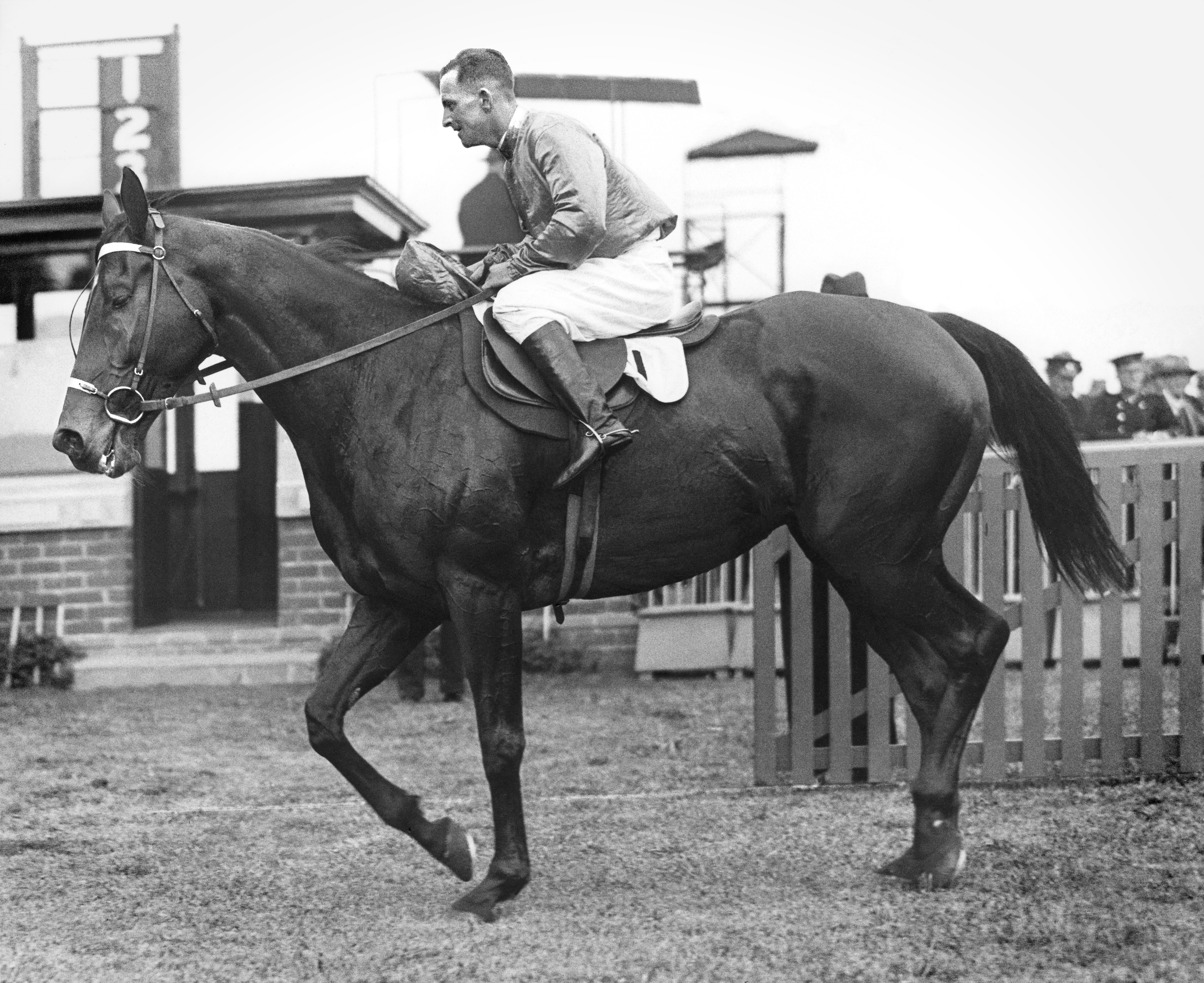
Amounis, 1925 winner

== History ==
Many champions have been victorious in this race, including Phar Lap, Ajax, Tulloch, Dulcify, Kingston Town, Octagonal, Naturalism and Tie The Knot.

=== 1921 racebook ===
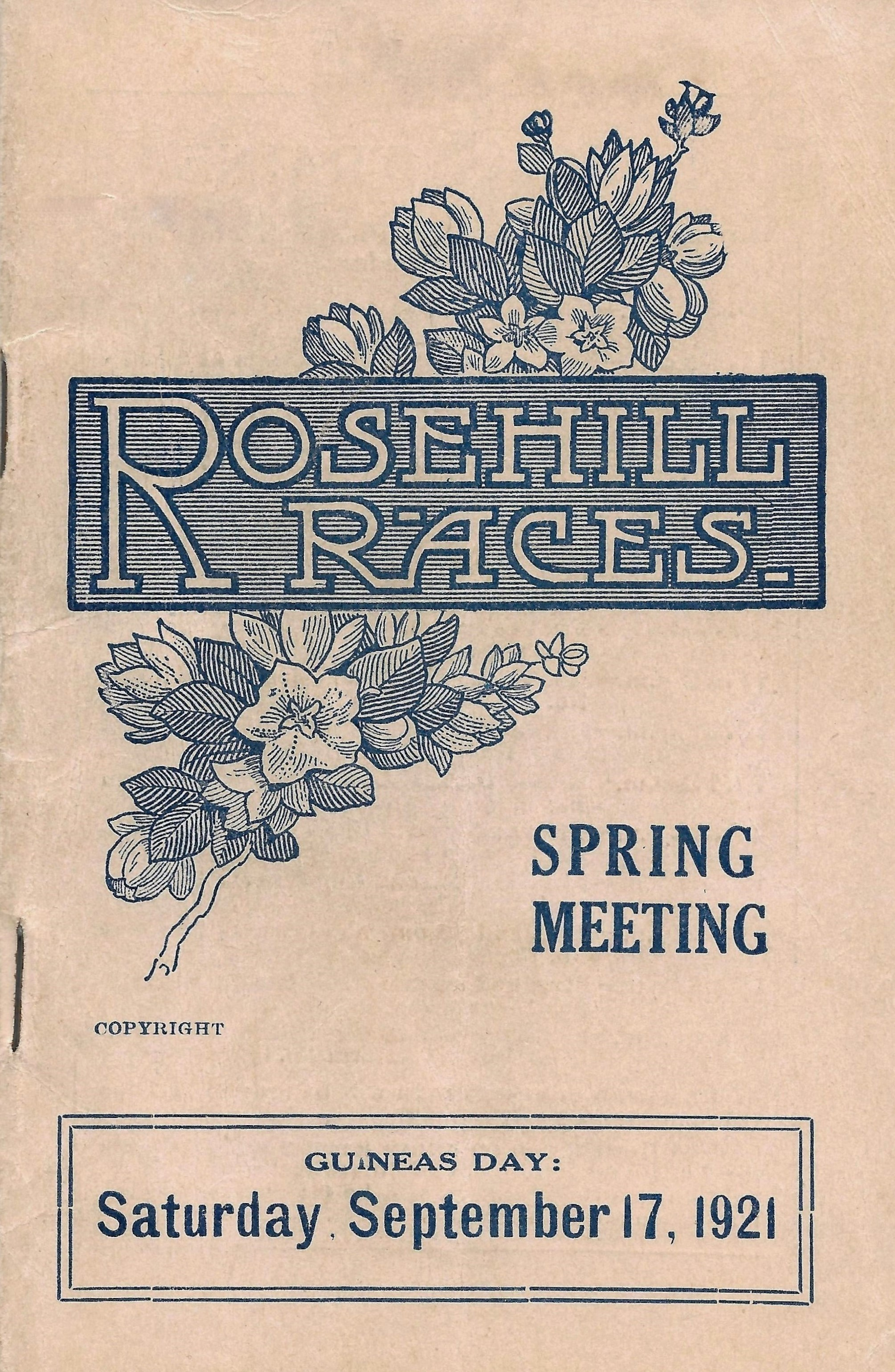
1921 RRC Rosehill Guineas racebook front cover

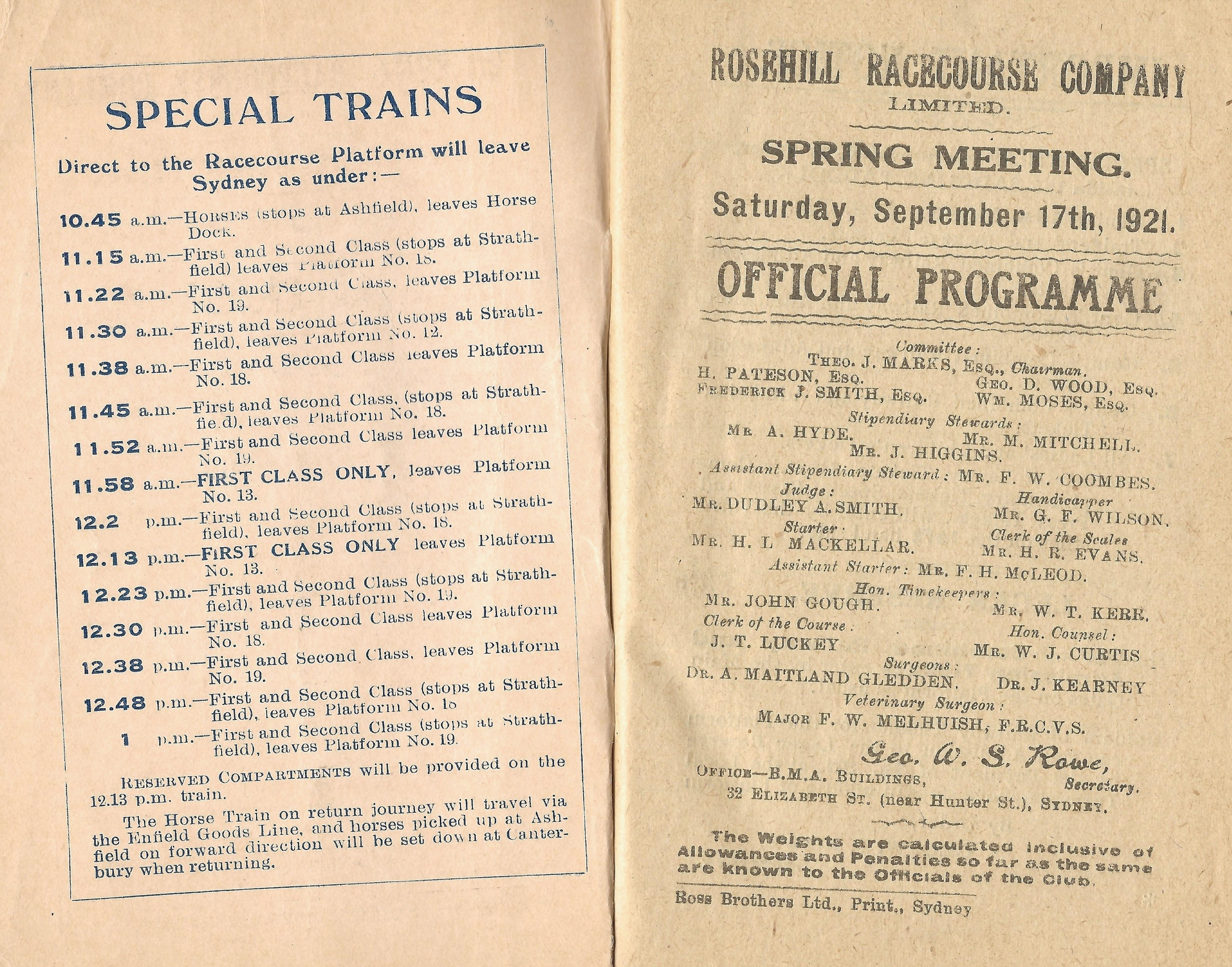
1921 RRC Rosehill Guineas showing officials and race day train timetable

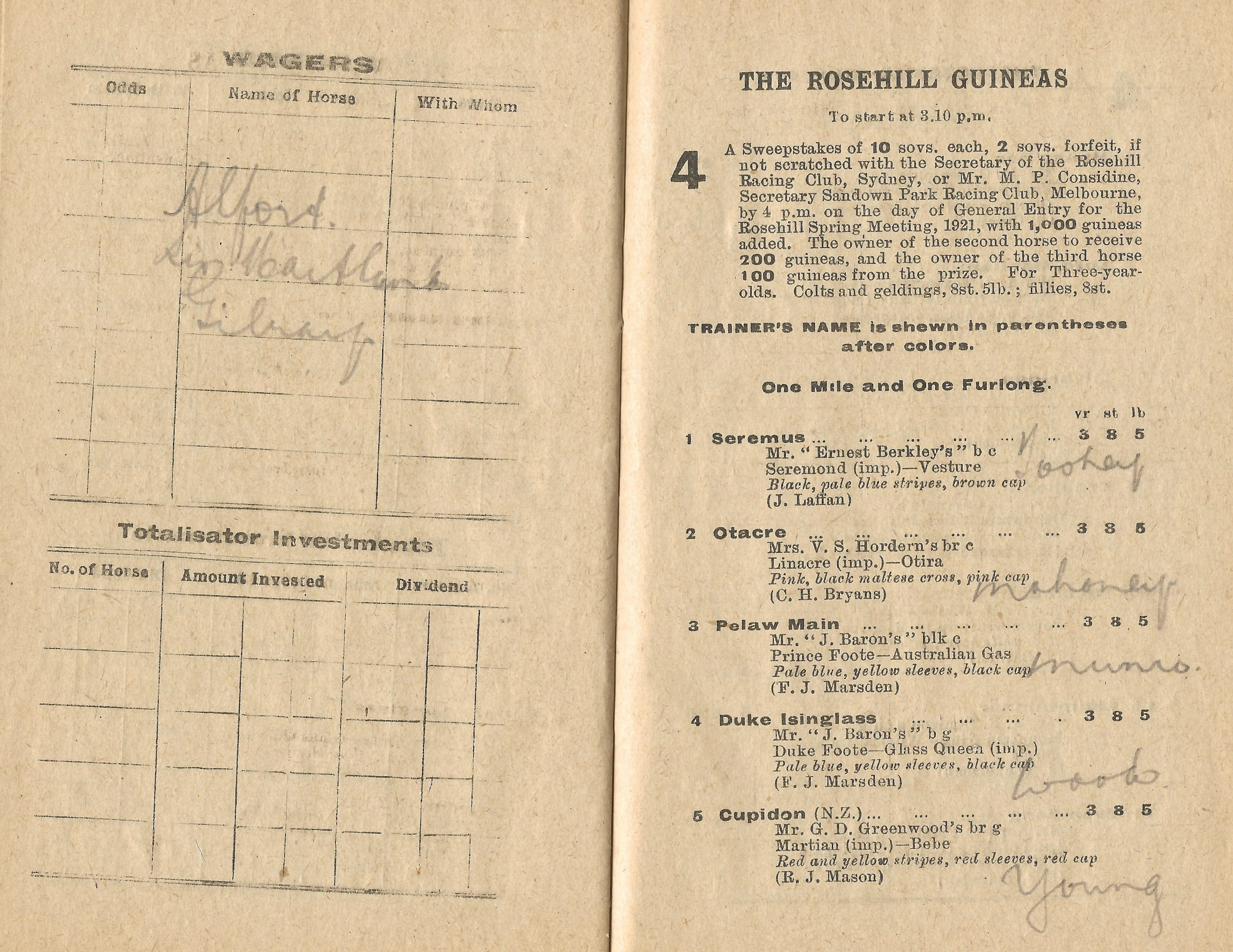
1921 RRC Rosehill Guineas starters and results

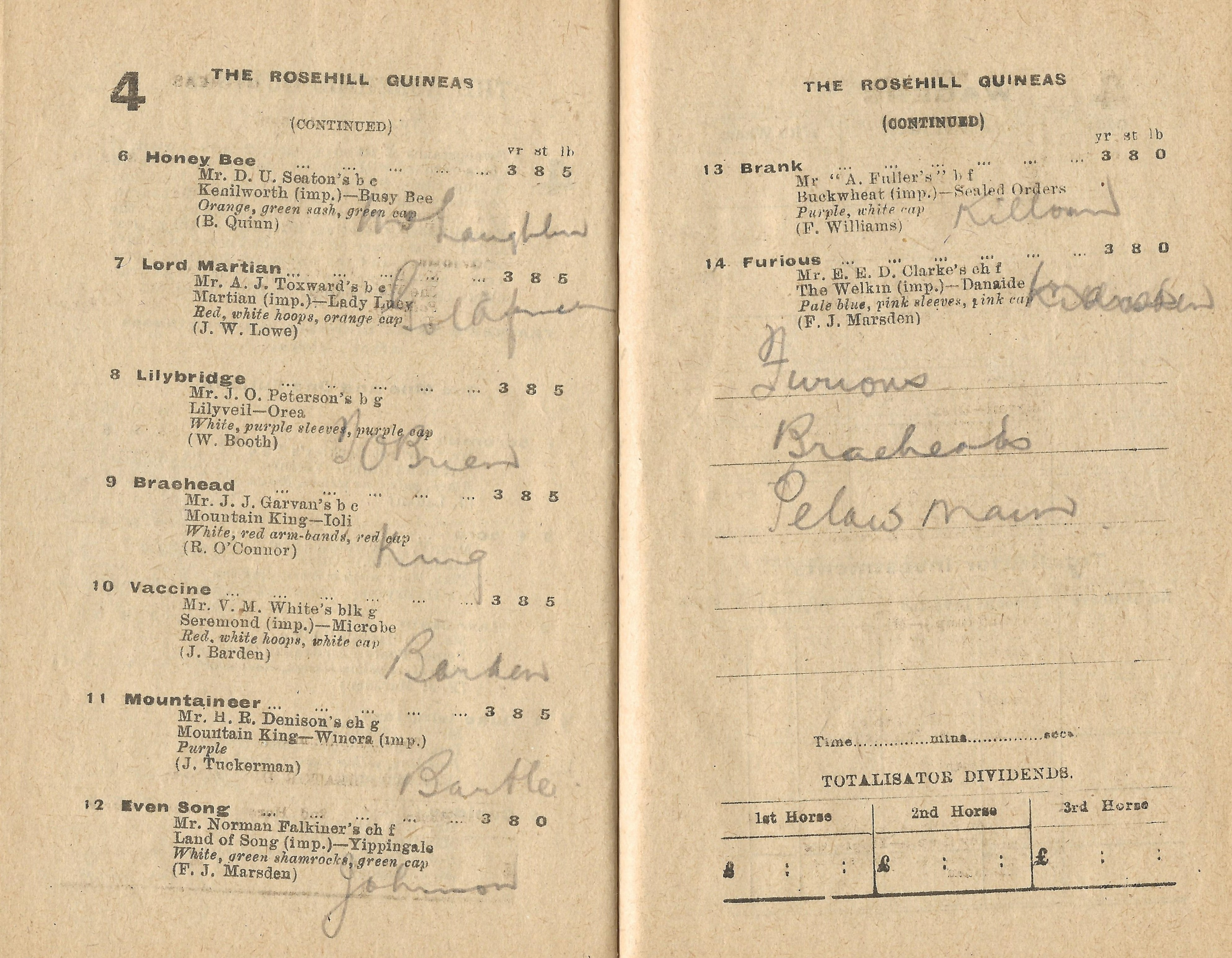
1921 RRC Rosehill Guineas showing the winner, Furious

=== Distance ===
- 1910–1914 held - 7 furlongs (~1400 metres)
- 1915–1947 held - 1 1/8 miles (~1800 metres)
- 1948–1972 held - 1 1/4 miles (~2000 metres)
- 1973 onwards - 2000 metres

=== Grade ===
- 1910–1979 - Principal Race
- 1980 onwards - Group 1

=== Recent multiple winners ===
Jockeys

- James McDonald (2013, 2022, 2025, 2026)
- Hugh Bowman (2007, 2014, 2018)
- Nash Rawiller (2010, 2012, 2023, 2024)
- Craig Williams (2006, 2015, 2020)

Trainers

- Chris Waller (2018. 2019, 2023, 2024, 2026)

=== Race record times ===
- 1:59.99 - Danewin (1995) & Octagonal (1996)

== Gallery of noted winners ==
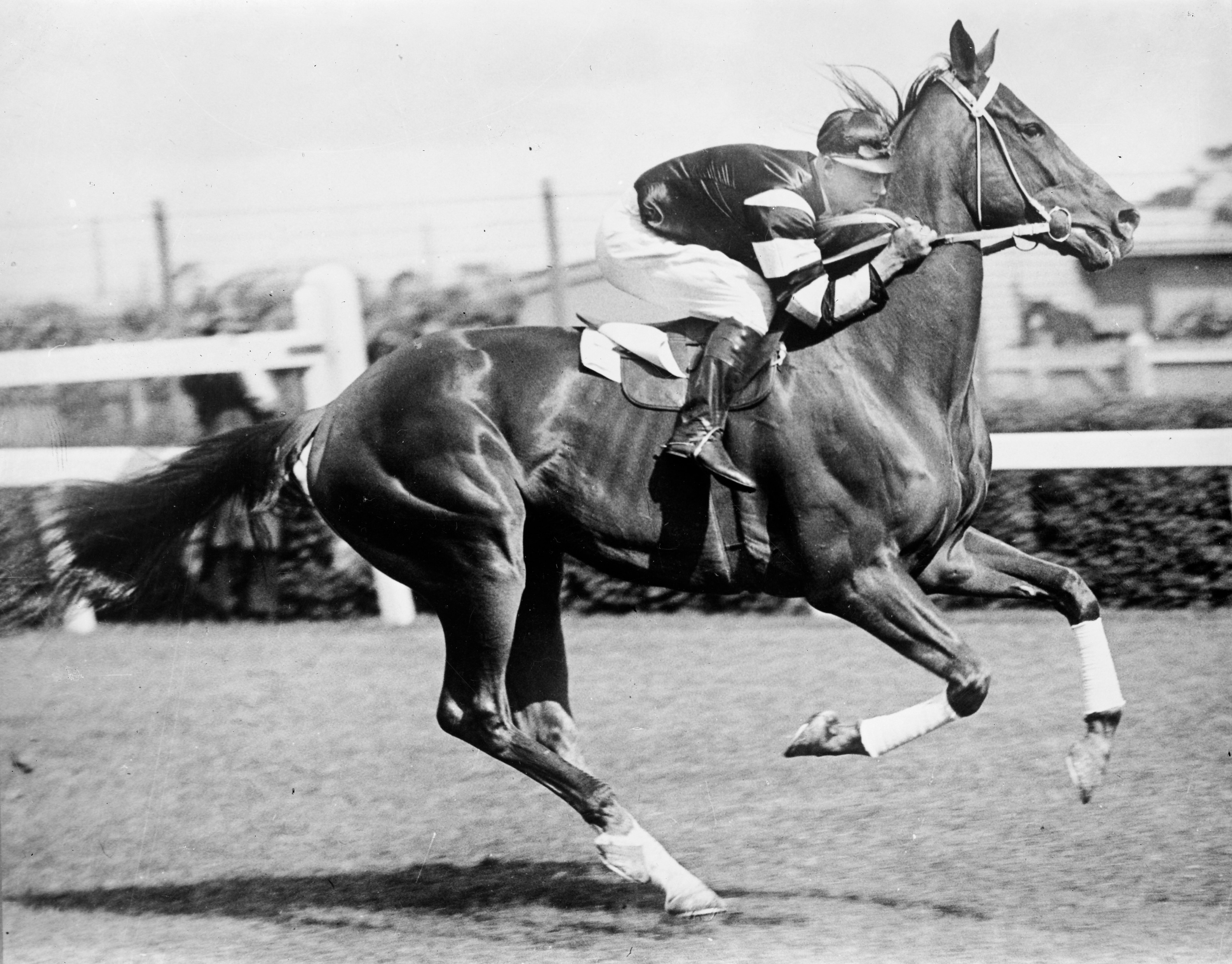
Phar Lap, 1929 winner

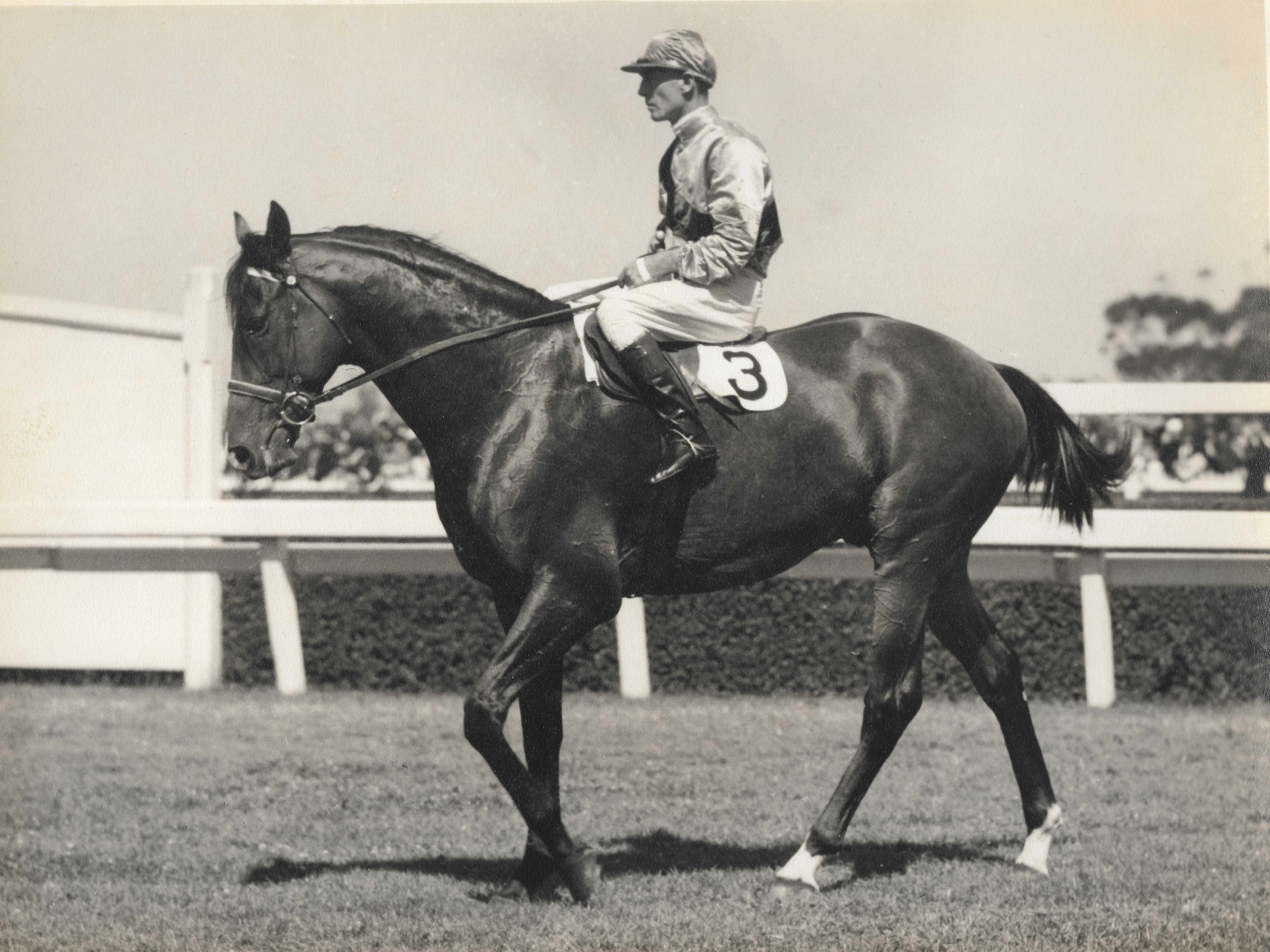
High Caste, 1939 winner

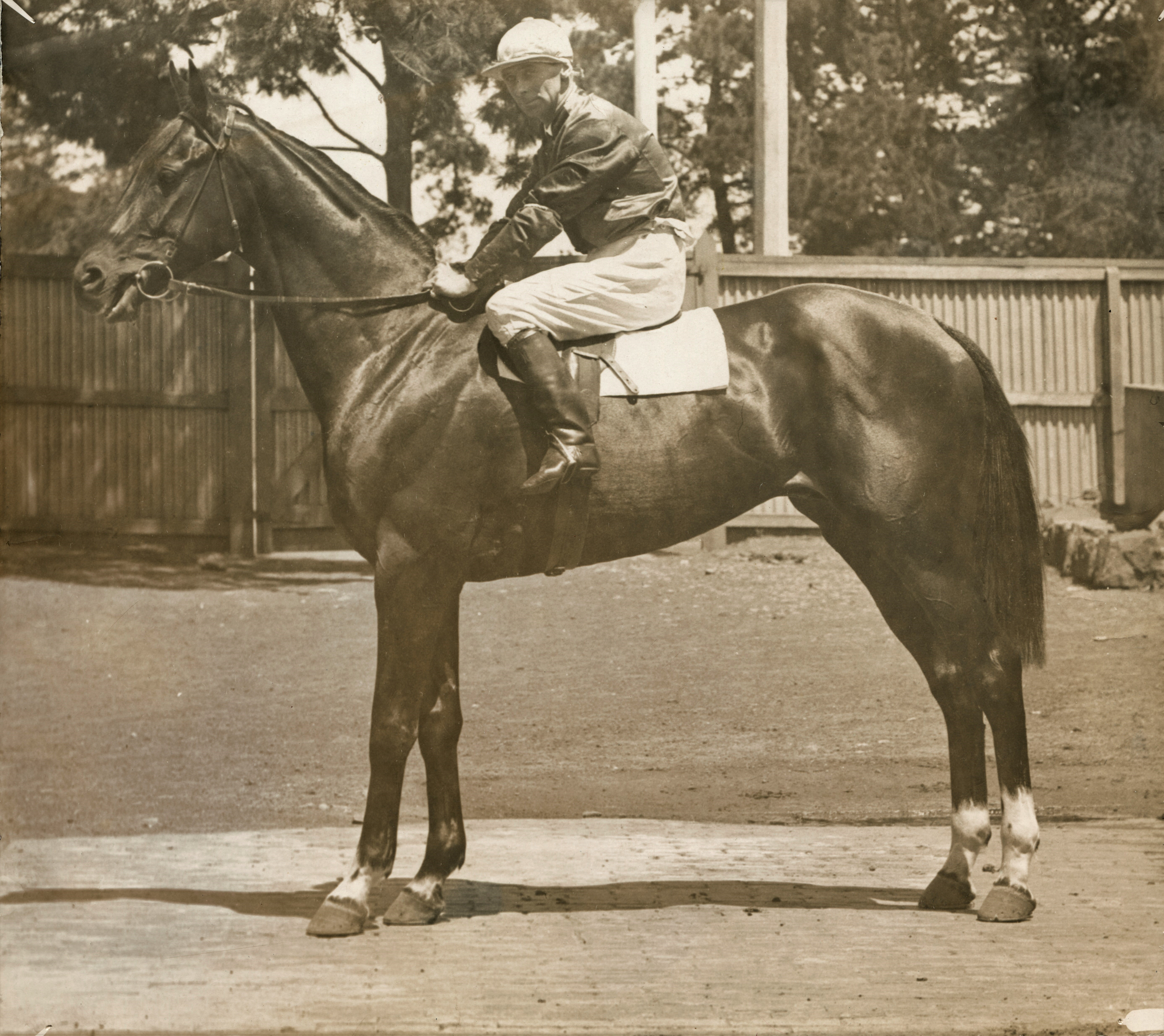
Biplane, 1917 winner with B. Deeley

== Winners ==
The following are past winners of the race.

- 2026 - Autumn Boy
- 2025 - Broadsiding
- 2024 - Riff Rocket
- 2023 - Lindermann
- 2022 - Anamoe
- 2021 - Mo'unga
- 2020 - Castelvecchio
- 2019 - The Autumn Sun
- 2018 - D'Argento
- 2017 - Gingernuts
- 2016 - Tarzino
- 2015 - Volkstok'n'barrell
- 2014 - Criterion
- 2013 - It's A Dundeel
- 2012 - Laser Hawk
- 2011 - Jimmy Choux
- 2010 - Zabrasive
- 2009 - Metal Bender
- 2008 - Dealer Principle
- 2007 - He's No Pie Eater
- 2006 - De Beers
- 2005 - Eremein
- 2004 - Niello
- 2003 - Helenus
- 2002 - Carnegie Express
- 2001 - Sale Of Century
- 2000 - Diatribe
- 1999 - Sky Heights
- 1998 - Tie The Knot
- 1997 - Tarnpir Lane
- 1996 -Octagonal
- 1995 - Danewin
- 1994 - Star Of Maple
- 1993 - Innocent King
- 1992 - Naturalism
- 1991 - Surfers Paradise
- 1990 - Solar Circle
- 1989 - Riverina Charm
- 1988 - Sky Chase
- 1987 - Ring Joe
- 1986 - Drawn
- 1985 - Spirit Of Kingston
- 1984 - Alibhai
- 1983 - Strawberry Road
- 1982 - Isle of Man
- 1981 - Deck The Halls
- 1980 - Kingston Town
- 1979 - Dulcify
- 1978 - †race not held
- 1977 - Lefroy
- 1976 - Fashion Beau
- 1975 - Battle Sign
- 1974 - Taras Bulba
- 1973 - Imagele
- 1972 - Longfella
- 1971 - Latin Knight
- 1970 - Royal Show
- 1969 - Portable
- 1968 - Royal Account
- 1967 - Grey Spirit
- 1966 - Dark Briar
- 1965 - Fair Summer
- 1964 - Eskimo Prince
- 1963 - Castanea
- 1962 - Bogan Road
- 1961 - King Brian
- 1960 - Wenona Girl
- 1959 - Martello Towers
- 1958 - Bold Pilot
- 1957 - Tulloch
- 1956 - Gay Lover
- 1955 - Caranna
- 1954 - Pride Of Egypt
- 1953 - Silver Hawk
- 1952 - Idlewild
- 1951 - Hydrogen
- 1950 - Careless
- 1949 - Thracian Lad
- 1948 - Royal Andrew
- 1947 - Conductor
- 1946 - Prince Standard
- 1945 - Questing
- 1944 - Tea Rose
- 1943 - Moorland
- 1942 - Hall Stand
- 1941 - Laureate
- 1940 - Tidal Wave
- 1939 - High Caste
- 1938 - Aeolus
- 1937 - Ajax
- 1936 - Shakespeare
- 1935 - Hadrian
- 1934 - Silver King
- 1933 - Blixten
- 1932 - Bronze Hawk
- 1931 - Lightning March
- 1930 - Balloon King
- 1929 - Phar Lap
- 1928 - Mollison
- 1927 - Winalot
- 1926 - Cromwell
- 1925 - Amounis
- 1924 - Nigger Minstrel
- 1923 - All Sunshine
- 1922 - Caserta
- 1921 - Furious
- 1920 - Wirriway
- 1919 - Elfacre
- 1918 - Woorawa
- 1917 - Biplane
- 1916 - Wolaroi
- 1915 - Wallace Isinglass
- 1914 - Carlita
- 1913 - Beau Soult
- 1912 - Burri
- 1911 - Woolerina
- 1910 - Electric Wire

† Change in scheduling of race from spring to autumn

== See also ==
- Australian Triple Crown of Thoroughbred Racing
- Birthday Card Stakes
- Epona Stakes
- George Ryder Stakes
- Golden Slipper Stakes
- Ranvet Stakes
- The Galaxy (ATC)
- List of Australian Group races
- Group races
