= The Galaxy (ATC) =

- Class: Group 1
- Location: Rosehill Gardens Racecourse
- Inaugurated: 1972
- Race type: Thoroughbred - flat
- Sponsor: Kia Ora Stud (2023-26)

Race information
- Distance: 1,100 metres
- Surface: Turf
- Track: Right-handed
- Weight: Open Handicap
- Purse: A$1,000,000 (2026)
- Bonuses: Exempt from ballot in TJ Smith Stakes

The Galaxy is an Australian Turf Club Group One Thoroughbred open handicap horse race, run over a distance of 1,100 metres at Rosehill Gardens Racecourse in Sydney, Australia in March or April.

== History ==
=== Grade ===
- 1972–1978 - Principal Race
- 1979 - Listed Race
- 1980–1983 - Group 2
- 1984 onwards - Group 1

=== Venue ===
- 1972–2006 - Randwick Racecourse
- 2007 - Warwick Farm Racecourse
- 2008–2012 - Randwick Racecourse
- 2013 onwards - Rosehill Gardens Racecourse

=== Recent multiple winners ===
Jockeys

- Kerrin McEvoy (2013, 2017, 2024, 2026)
- Tim Clark (2008, 2011, 2020)

Trainers

- Joseph Pride (2001, 2014, 2021, 2023)

== Winners ==
The following are past winners of the race.

- 2026 - Marhoona
- 2025 - Private Harry
- 2024 - Zapateo
- 2023 - Mariamia
- 2022 - Shelby Sixtysix
- 2021 - Eduardo
- 2020 - I Am Excited
- 2019 - Nature Strip
- 2018 - In Her Time
- 2017 - Russian Revolution
- 2016 - Griante
- 2015 - Sweet Idea
- 2014 - Tiger Tees
- 2013 - Bel Sprinter
- 2012 - Temple Of Boom
- 2011 - Atomic Force
- 2010 - †Shellscrape
- 2009 - Nicconi
- 2008 - Typhoon Zed
- 2007 - Magnus
- 2006 - Proprietor
- 2005 - Charge Forward
- 2004 - Spark Of Life
- 2003 - Snowland
- 2002 - Mistegic
- 2001 - Padstow
- 2000 - Black Bean
- 1999 - Masked Party
- 1998 - La Baraka
- 1997 - Accomplice
- 1996 - Gold Ace
- 1995 - Magic Of Money
- 1994 - Jetball
- 1993 - Sublimate
- 1992 - Schillaci
- 1991 - Mr Tiz
- 1990 - Potrero
- 1989 - Targlish
- 1988 - Snippets
- 1987 - Princely Heart
- 1986 - Rich Fields Lad
- 1985 - Manuan
- 1984 - Mr Illusion
- 1983 - Bronze Spirit
- 1982 - Grey Receiver
- 1981 - Grey Receiver
- 1980 - Hit It Benny
- 1979 - Mistress Anne
- 1978 - Luskin Star
- 1977 - Salaam
- 1976 - Wayne's Bid
- 1975 - Bletchingly
- 1974 - Starglow
- 1973 - Kista
- 1972 - Playbill

† Ortensia was first past the post but was disqualified for positive drug test

== See also ==
- Birthday Card Stakes
- Epona Stakes
- George Ryder Stakes
- Golden Slipper Stakes
- Ranvet Stakes
- Rosehill Guineas
- List of Australian Group races
- Group races
