= George Ryder Stakes =

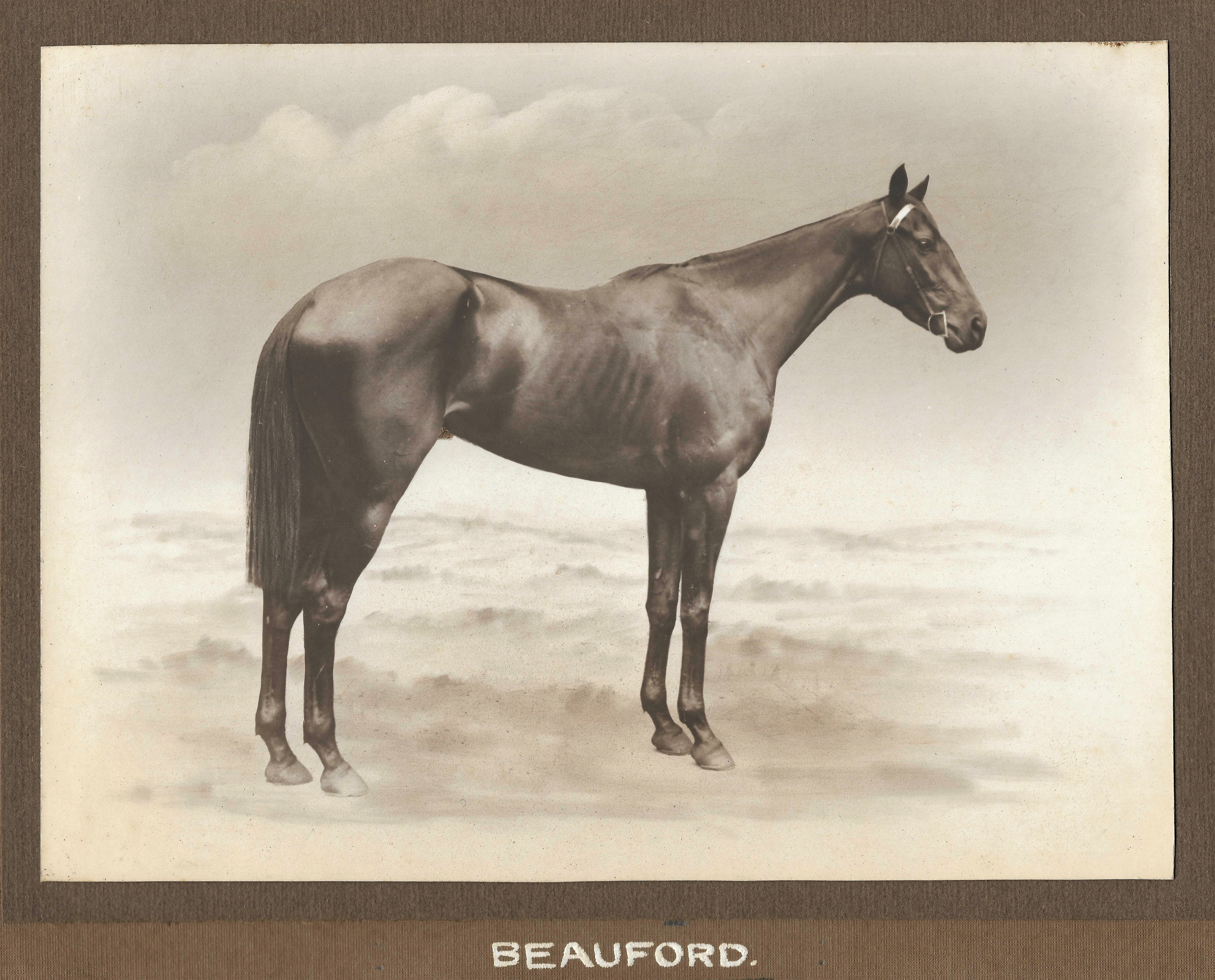
- Beauford, 1921 winner
- Class: Group 1
- Location: Rosehill Gardens Racecourse
- Inaugurated: 1903 (as Railway Stakes)
- Race type: Thoroughbred
- Sponsor: The Agency (2018-26)

Race information
- Distance: 1500 metres
- Surface: Turf
- Track: Right-handed
- Qualification: Three years old and over
- Weight: Weight for age
- Purse: $1,000,000 (2026)
- Bonuses: Exempt from ballot – Doncaster Handicap

The George Ryder Stakes is an Australian Turf Club Group 1 Thoroughbred horse race for three-year-olds and over at Weight for age conditions, over a distance of 1500 metres at Rosehill Gardens Racecourse, Sydney, Australia in March or April. It is run on the same day as the Golden Slipper Stakes.

Winx is the only horse to have won the race more than two times.

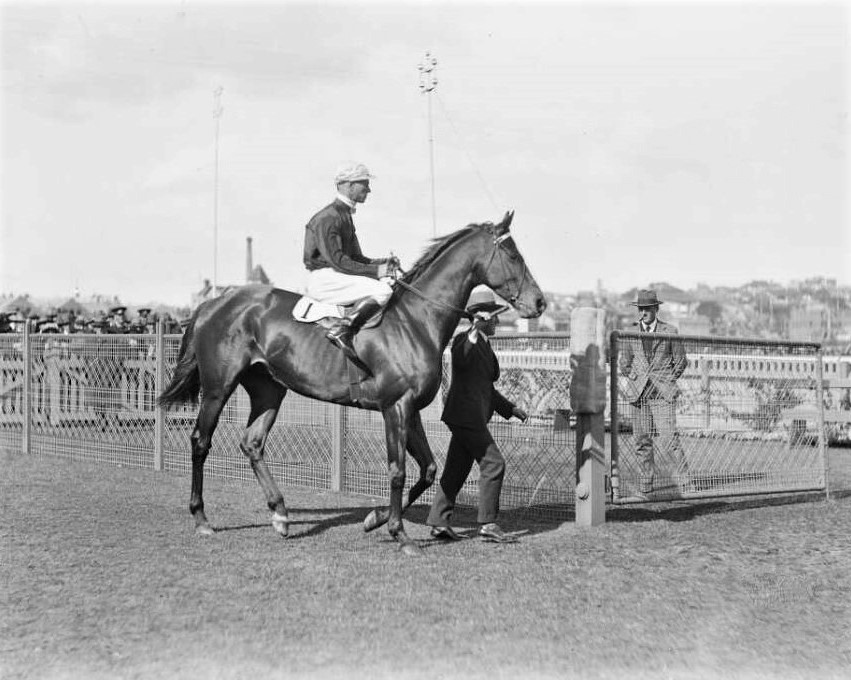
Fujisan, 1927 winner

== History ==
The origins of the race are from 1903 when the race was run as the Railway Stakes on the same race card as the Rawson Stakes. The race was renamed in 1974 in honour of George E. Ryder who was a racing administrator, stud master and businessman.

The winner is exempt from ballot for the prestigious Doncaster Handicap.

=== Name ===
- 1903–1914 - Railway Stakes
- 1915–1945 - Railway Handicap
- 1946–1973 - Railway Quality Handicap
- 1968–1970 - CP Air Quality Hcp
- 1971–1973 - Railway Quality Handicap
- 1974–2017 - George Ryder Stakes

=== Distance ===
- 1903–1914 - 6 1/2 furlongs (~1300 metres)
- 1915–1972 - 7 furlongs (~1400 metres)
- 1973–1984 - 1400 metres
- 1985 - 1450 metres (~7.2 furlongs)
- 1986 onwards - 1500 metres (~7.5 furlongs)

=== Grade ===
- 1903–1979 - Principal race
- 1980 onwards - Group 1 race

=== Recent multiple winners ===
Trainers

- Chris Waller in 2010, 2011, 2012, 2016-19 (Winx) and 2026
- John Hawkes in 2002, 2003 and 2004.

Jockeys

- Hugh Bowman in 2005, 2010, 2016-2019 (Winx) and 2022
- Glen Boss in 2006, 2007 and 2021
- James McDonald in 2015, 2023 and 2026.

== Winners ==
The following are past winners of the race.

- 2026 - Autumn Glow
- 2025 - Gringotts
- 2024 - Veight
- 2023 - Anamoe
- 2022 - Forbidden Love
- 2021 - Think It Over
- 2020 - Dreamforce
- 2019 - Winx
- 2018 - Winx
- 2017 - Winx
- 2016 - Winx
- 2015 - Real Impact
- 2014 - Gordon Lord Byron
- 2013 - Pierro
- 2012 - Metal Bender
- 2011 - Rangirangdoo
- 2010 - Danleigh
- 2009 - Vision And Power
- 2008 - Weekend Hussler
- 2007 - Haradasun
- 2006 - Racing To Win
- 2005 - Court's In Session
- 2004 - Lonhro
- 2003 - Lonhro
- 2002 - Lord Essex
- 2001 - Landsighting
- 2000 - Al Mansour
- 1999 - Referral
- 1998 - Quick Flick
- 1997 - Mouawad
- 1996 - Ravarda
- 1995 - March Hare
- 1994 - Telesto
- 1993 - Schillaci
- 1992 - Kinjite
- 1991 - Bureaucracy
- 1990 - Straussbrook
- 1989 - Wong
- 1988 - Campaign King
- 1987 - Campaign King
- 1986 - Heat Of The Moment
- 1985 - Hula Drum
- 1984 - Emancipation
- 1983 - Emancipation
- 1982 - Pure Of Heart
- 1981 - Prince Ruling
- 1980 - Manikato
- 1979 - Manikato
- 1978 - Command Module
- 1977 - Pacific Ruler
- 1976 - Superior Air
- 1975 - Dalrello
- 1974 - Itchy Feet
- 1973 - All Shot
- 1972 - Triton
- 1971 - Baguette
- 1970 - Boy Dandy
- 1969 - Foresight
- 1968 - Foresight
- 1967 - Time And Tide
- 1966 - Rakaia
- 1965 - Rush Bye
- 1964 - Time And Tide
- 1963 - Prince Regoli
- 1962 - Prince Regoli
- 1961 - Grecian Vale
- 1960 - Man Of Iron
- 1959 - Book Link
- 1958 - Chieti
- 1957 - New Spec
- 1956 - King's Fair
- 1955 - Gay Vista
- 1954 - Carioca
- 1953 - Regoli
- 1952 - Coniston
- 1951 - Drastic
- 1950 - Buzmark
- 1949 - Comedy Prince
- 1948 - Heroic Sovereign
- 1947 - Tamaroa
- 1946 - Bragger
- 1945 - Melhero
- 1944 - Warlock
- 1943 - Triad
- 1942 - race not held
- 1941 - Evergreen
- 1940 - Cigarette
- 1939 - Bramol
- 1938 - Mohican
- 1937 - Cereza
- 1936 - Gay Blonde
- 1935 - †Sarcherie / High
- 1934 - Leila Vale
- 1933 - Whittingham
- 1932 - Myles La Coplen
- 1931 - Casque D'Or
- 1930 - †Sir Chrystopher / Greenline
- 1929 - Cleave
- 1928 - Vaals
- 1928 - Ascalon
- 1927 - †Fujisan / Cavedweller
- 1926 - Lausanne
- 1925 - Encre
- 1925 - Valiant
- 1924 - Claro
- 1923 - Naharadan
- 1923 - Volpi
- 1922 - †Sir Maitland / Braehead
- 1921 - Beauford
- 1920 - Chrysolaus
- 1919 - Hem
- 1918 - Dame Acre
- 1917 - Spurn
- 1916 - Gold Brew
- 1915 - Eugeny
- 1914 - Sunlike
- 1913 - race not held
- 1912 - Miocene
- 1911 - Maltster Maid
- 1910 - Vauntie
- 1909 - Microscope
- 1908 - Lord Merv
- 1907 - Thalaba
- 1906 - Zythos
- 1905 - Lucknow
- 1904 - Cressy
- 1903 - Marvel Loch

† Race run in Divisions

== See also ==
- Birthday Card Stakes
- Epona Stakes
- Golden Slipper Stakes
- Ranvet Stakes
- Rosehill Guineas
- The Galaxy (ATC)
- List of Australian Group races
- Group races
