= Ocean Park (horse) =

New Zealand-bred Thoroughbred racehorse

- Sire: Thorn Park
- Dam: Sayyida
- Sex: Stallion
- Foaled: 13 October 2008
- Country: New Zealand
- Colour: Bay
- Breeder: Trelawney Thoroughbred Ltd
- Owner: Mr A Wong, Mr S Yan & Mr G Hennessy
- Trainer: Gary Hennessy, Matamata
- Record: 15: 8-3-1
- Earnings: A$2,692,126

Major wins
- W. S. Cox Plate (2012); Caulfield Stakes (2012); Underwood Stakes (2012); Challenge Stakes (2012); Wellington Guineas (2012); New Zealand Stakes (2013)

Awards
- New Zealand Horse of the Year (2012/13)

Ocean Park (foaled 13 October 2008) is a New Zealand Thoroughbred racehorse. His biggest win came on 27 October 2012 in the Group 1 Cox Plate at Moonee Valley racecourse.

He was bred by Trelawney Stud. After a promising 3 year old year, Ocean Park rose to prominence in the spring of his four-year-old season, winning 4 Group 1s in a row before running 3rd in the McKinnon Stakes.

His tactical speed, race performance, and finishing burst are described as his primary attributes.

He added to an impressive list of Group 1 performing progeny of his sire Thorn Park that includes 2011 New Zealand Derby winner Jimmy Choux.

He was trained by Gary Hennessy in Matamata. Before he won Group one races, his owners suggested Ocean Park should be sent to Hong Kong, but his trainer/part owner wanted to keep training him in New Zealand.

== Spring 2011 - Autumn 2012 ==
Ocean Park debuted at the Poverty Bay turf club for a fast-finishing win, albeit in a dead heat. He followed this up with another impressive win at Ellerslie. However, a true display of his ability came at his third start in the Great Northern Guineas at Ellerslie. After being held up for a run well into the straight, Ocean Park finally got clear and stormed home impressively to only miss by a head against strong competition.

He started a short-priced favourite at his next start in the Wellington Guineas and won easily, being eased down by rider Chad Ormsby in the final stages.

Perhaps his biggest weakness was his lack of ability to fend off runners that closed from behind. This was displayed at his next start in the Waikato Guineas, where subsequent New Zealand Derby winner Silent Achiever came from behind late and won narrowly.

He was scratched from the New Zealand Derby due to a wet track and was instead sent to Sydney where he finished a disappointing 8th in the Randwick Guineas behind Mosheen on a wet track and an unlucky 2nd in the Rosehill Guineas behind Laser Hawk. His three-year-old season was ended on a sour note as he was scratched from the AJC Derby due to a wrenched fetlock joint.

== Spring 2012 ==
Ocean Park resumed in the Makfi Challenge Stakes at Hastings. After being ridden quietly back in the field, rider Lisa Allpress found a gap in the straight and he burst through for an emphatic win.

He was then taken across to Australia on a preparation geared towards the Cox Plate. After scoring an impressive win in the Underwood Stakes, he followed up with a narrow win in the Caulfield Stakes. Sent out third favourite in the W. S. Cox Plate, rider Glen Boss ensured that Ocean Park was ridden back in the field so that he had a 'bunny' to chase. After coming wide around the field on the home turn he sprinted after All Too Hard and got up for a narrow win.

His spring campaign was rounded out with a close third behind Alcopop and Glass Harmonium in the LKS Mackinnon Stakes

== Autumn 2013 ==
Ocean Park resumed at Otaki racecourse on 24 February 2013 for a close, but slightly disappointing fourth behind Nashville, a horse he had soundly defeated in the Wellington Guineas a year earlier.

Ocean Park went on to win the 2013 New Zealand Stakes, before finishing his racing career with a disappointing 12th in the 2013 Dubai Duty Free.

== Stud career ==
Ocean Park currently serves as a stallion at New Zealand's Waikato Stud. His service fee was $30,000 in 2017 and 2023. In 2026 his service fee was $15,000.

Ocean Park has gone on to sire Group/Grade 1 winners in New Zealand and Australia.

=== Notable progeny ===
c = colt, f = filly, g = gelding

Foaled	Name	Sex	Dam	Damsire	Major Wins
2015	Kolding	g	Magic Star (Aus)	Danzero (Aus)	2021 All Aged Stakes; 2020 George Main Stakes; 2019 Golden Eagle, 2019 Epsom Handicap; 2019 Bill Ritchie Handicap, 2019 Queensland Guineas
2015	Ocean Billy	g	Cool Storm (NZ)	One Cool Cat (Usa)	2021 Auckland Cup
2015	Tofane	f	Baggy Green (Aus)	Galileo (Ire)	2020 All Aged Stakes, 2021 Stradbroke Handicap; 2022 C F Orr Stakes
2019	Kovalica	g	Vitesse (NZ)	Makfi (GB)	2023 Queensland Derby
2022	Ohope Wins	f	Choux Mania (Aus)	Redoute's Choice	2026 New Zealand Oaks; 2026 Australian Oaks

== See also ==
- Thoroughbred racing in New Zealand
