= The Autumn Sun =

Australian-bred Thoroughbred racehorse

- Sire: Redoute's Choice
- Grandsire: Danehill
- Dam: Azmiyna
- Damsire: Galileo
- Sex: Colt
- Foaled: 2 September 2015
- Country: Australia
- Colour: Bay
- Owner: Hermitage; Arrowfield Stud
- Trainer: Chris Waller
- Record: 9-8-0-1
- Earnings: A$3,548,371

Major wins
- The J. J. Atkins (G1)(2018); Golden Rose Stakes (G1)(2018); Caulfield Guineas (G1)(2018); Hobartville Stakes (G2)(2019); Randwick Guineas (G1) (2019); Rosehill Guineas (G1) (2019)

Awards
- Australian Champion Three Year Old Colt/Gelding (2018-19)
- Last updated on 23 March 2019

The Autumn Sun (foaled 2 September 2015) is a retired Thoroughbred racehorse and active sire trained and bred in Australia. He won five Group One races and over three million dollars.

== Racing career ==
The Autumn Sun was purchased for $650,000 at the 2016 Inglis Easter Yearling Sale. Olly Koolman of Hermitage said, "We went with the plan to buy a Derby winner. Guy Mulcaster identified him and had him on a shortlist. He was one of the first through the ring on that list and we bought confidently with him."

From December 2017, The Autumn Sun had 4 trials before he made his debut at Royal Randwick on 25 April 2018. Trapped 3 wide, he took the lead with 100 metres left in an "eye-catching debut". A month later, he won his second race at Randwick, where it was said, "the further the race went the more decisive and dominant he became."

On 9 June, The Autumn Sun won The J. J. Atkins, coming from 6 lengths back to win. Trainer Chris Waller said, "I was questioning whether at only his third start, like State of Origin, only certain people and horses can take those steps. We just said if things work out and if he's as good as we think he is, he could win the J.J. Atkins."

After three months spell, The Autumn Sun had two Sydney trials in August 2018. Next was the Group 2 Stan Fox Stakes, where he failed to win for the first time. In a "horror story", he was trapped on the rail and blocked for a run, eventually finishing third. Jockey Kerrin McEvoy considered protesting against the winner for interference. Waller said, "He was very unlucky, we will leave it at that."

A fortnight later, The Autumn Sun won his second Group 1, the Golden Rose Stakes. McEvoy said, "I was bit worried when I got to the outside at 350m. I was still last then, but in 10 strides I knew he was the winner. To be doing that to a very good group of colts at what I consider his minimum distance is amazing. Wait until he gets to a mile and 2000m – he is going to get much better." The Sydney Morning Herald described him as, "already the best colt of his generation".

A further Group 1 was won two weeks later in the Caulfield Guineas. Jumping as $1.70 favourite, he settled in a poor position, but "romped away to win in stunning fashion" to win by four and a half lengths. Jockey James Mcdonald said, "He is still a baby. I wanted to be wide with cover but he jumped too well, he was first out and he has never done that in his life. I was worried – of course – I could feel the hands of the punters getting tighter and tighter around my neck."

Spelled for 4 months, The Autumn Sun returned in the Group 2 Hobartville Stakes in February 2019. Punters.com.au said, "After a spring in which he cemented himself as the star three-year-old in Australia, The Autumn Sun's much-anticipated return has followed the script at Rosehill. The nation's most valuable colt came from last to win, overhauling previously unbeaten Vegadaze by a long neck."

On 9 March in the Randwick Guineas against a field of 9 including Nakeeta Jane (winner of the 2019 Surround Stakes and 2019 Light Fingers Stakes) and Miss Fabulass (2018 Tea Rose Stakes) he was about 10 lengths off Miss Fabulass passing the 400m mark. The Autumn Sun was always getting closer to the leader through the straight and at the post The Autumn Sun crossed first winning by a head to Fundamentalist. He also equalled the race record of Kementari who won in 2018 with a time of 1:33.72 which gave him his 4th Group One race and 4th consecutive win since his 3rd in the Stan Fox Stakes.

== Stud career ==
In April 2019, The Autumn Sun was retired to stud, with a service fee of $77,000. Hermitage Thoroughbreds and Arrowfield Stud released a statement saying, "After extensive discussions, the opportunity to return the colt to his spiritual home and fill the gap left by the death of Redoute's Choice provide too compelling."

=== Notable progeny ===
c = colt, f = filly, g = gelding

Foaled	Name	Sex	Major wins
2020	Autumn Angel	f	Australian Oaks
2020	Coco Sun	f	South Australian Derby
2020	Vibrant Sun	f	Australasian Oaks
2021	Autumn Glow	f	Epsom Handicap, Verry Elleegant Stakes, George Ryder Stakes, Winx Stakes, King Charles III Stakes
2022	Autumn Boy	c	Caulfield Guineas, Rosehill Guineas

== Pedigree ==
Pedigree of The Autumn Sun (AUS) 2015
Sire Redoute's Choice (AUS) 1996	Danehill (USA); 1986	Danzig	Northern Dancer
Sire Redoute's Choice (AUS) 1996	Danehill (USA); 1986	Danzig	Pas De Nom
Sire Redoute's Choice (AUS) 1996	Danehill (USA); 1986	Razyana	His Majesty
Sire Redoute's Choice (AUS) 1996	Danehill (USA); 1986	Razyana	Spring Adieu
Sire Redoute's Choice (AUS) 1996	Shanthas Choice (AUS); 1992	Canny Lad	Bletchingly
Sire Redoute's Choice (AUS) 1996	Shanthas Choice (AUS); 1992	Canny Lad	Jesmond Lass
Sire Redoute's Choice (AUS) 1996	Shanthas Choice (AUS); 1992	Dancing Show	Nijinsky
Sire Redoute's Choice (AUS) 1996	Shanthas Choice (AUS); 1992	Dancing Show	Show Lady
Dam Azmiyna (IRE) 2010	Galileo (IRE); 1998	Sadler's Wells	Northern Dancer
Dam Azmiyna (IRE) 2010	Galileo (IRE); 1998	Sadler's Wells	Fairy Bridge
Dam Azmiyna (IRE) 2010	Galileo (IRE); 1998	Urban Sea	Miswaki
Dam Azmiyna (IRE) 2010	Galileo (IRE); 1998	Urban Sea	Allegretta
Dam Azmiyna (IRE) 2010	Asmara (USA); 1993	Lear Fan	Roberto
Dam Azmiyna (IRE) 2010	Asmara (USA); 1993	Lear Fan	Wac
Dam Azmiyna (IRE) 2010	Asmara (USA); 1993	Anaza	Darshaan
Dam Azmiyna (IRE) 2010	Asmara (USA); 1993	Anaza	Azaarika
