= Chris Waller (horse trainer) =

New Zealand racehorse trainer

Personal information
- Born: 5 March 1973 (age 53) Foxton, New Zealand
- Occupation: Horse Trainer
- Spouse: Stephanie Waller
- Children: 2

Horse racing career
- Sport: Horse racing

Honours
- New Zealand Racing Hall of Fame; Australian Racing Hall of Fame

Significant horses
- Winx, Sacred Falls, Verry Elleegant, Yes Yes Yes, Brazen Beau, Nature Strip, Via Sistina, Autumn Glow

Chris Waller (born 5 March 1973), is a Hall of Fame trainer in Australian Thoroughbred racing best known for training the racemare Winx, a four-time winner of Australian Horse of the Year honours.

== Background ==
Born in New Zealand, Chris Waller grew up on his parents' dairy farm in Himatangi, near Palmerston North. He became interested in racing watching horses such as Melbourne Cup winner Kiwi and jockeys such as Jimmy Cassidy.

Waller worked for Foxton-based horse trainer, Patrick ("Paddy") Busuttin who was known for his top stayer Castletown. He progressed to stable foreman and when Busuttin moved to Singapore, Waller commenced training on his own account. His first winner was Go Morgan at Trentham Racecourse in 1997.

Waller's New Zealand training statistics were:

- 1996/97 - 5 wins from 37 starts for $35,520 stakes
- 1997/98 - 16 wins from 215 starts for $140,100
- 1998/99 - 16 wins from 186 starts for $130,130
- 1999/00 - 15 wins from 175 starts for $147,270
- 2000/01 - 8 wins from 69 starts for $62,326

His first Group win was on 12 February 2000, when he won the Dunedin Gold Cup (G3, 2400m) at Wingatui in the South Island, with Ripon By for the Dawn Fox's syndicate.

=== Party Belle ===
In 1998, Waller took a horse called Party Belle to New South Wales to race. She won three races in Australia, a 2100m maiden at Wyong in September 1998 (ridden by Opie Bosson), followed by a Class 1 and a Class 2 at Kembla Grange before attempting but failing in a listed race at Randwick. Party Belle then raced in New Zealand unsuccessfully before Waller took her back to Sydney the following winter when, she won three more races in May 1999 at Randwick and Warwick Farm, ridden by Larry Cassidy.

== Training in Australia ==
Waller applied for and obtained 20 horse boxes at Rosehill and commenced training there in 2000. Initially he had limited funds but he built his training operation up over time. His first Group 1 winner came in April 2008 when he won the Doncaster Handicap with Triple Honour (NZ).

He extended his operation with stables at Flemington, the Gold Coast and Warwick Farm.

On 24 April 2021, Chris brought up 125 Group 1 victories when Kolding won the All Aged Stakes at Randwick.

On 2 November 2021 Waller won his first Melbourne Cup with his horse Verry Elleegant.

== Group 1 Winners (213) ==
- All Aged Stakes (3) - Danleigh (2009); Kolding (2021); Beiwacht (2026)
- Australian Cup (1) - Preferment (2016)
- Australian Derby (2) - Riff Rocket (2024); Aeliana (2025)
- Australasian Oaks (3) - Egg Tart (2017); Toffee Tongue (2020); Panova (2026)
- Australian Oaks (5) - Royal Descent (2013); Unforgotten (2018); Verry Elleegant (2019); Hungry Heart (2021); Ohope Wins (2026)
- Canterbury Stakes (1) - Joliestar (2026)
- Caulfield Cup (2) - Verry Elleegant (2020); Durston (2022)
- Caulfield Guineas (4) - Press Statement (2015); The Autumn Sun (2018); Private Life (2024); Autumn Boy (2025)
- Caulfield Stakes (1) - Winx (2016)
- Champagne Stakes (2) - Militarize (2023); Fireball (2026)
- Champions Mile (5) - Albert The Fat (2011); Boban (2013); Shillelagh (2017); Yulong Prince (2020); Autumn Glow (2026)
- Champions Stakes (4) - Atishu (2023); Via Sistina (2024); Via Sistina (2025); Birdman (2026)
- Chipping Norton Stakes (12) - Danleigh (2011); Shoot Out (2012); Shoot Out (2013); Boban (2014); Winx (2016); Winx (2017); Winx (2018); Winx (2019); Verry Elleegant (2021); Verry Elleegant (2022); Via Sistina (2025); Autumn Glow (2026)
- Coolmore Classic (4) - Espiona (2023); Zougotcha (2024); Lady Shenandoah (2025); Lazzura (2026)
- Coolmore Stud Stakes (6) - Zoustar (2013); Brazen Beau (2014); Japonisme (2015); September Run (2020); Home Affairs (2021); Switzerland (2024)
- Cox Plate (6) - Winx (2015); Winx (2016); Winx (2017); Winx (2018); Via Sistina (2024); Via Sistina (2025)
- Darley Classic (3) - Delectation (2015); Nature Strip (2019); Nature Strip (2021)
- Doncaster Handicap (6) - Triple Honour (2008); Rangirangdoo (2010); Sacred Falls (2013); Sacred Falls (2014); Kermadec (2015); Winx (2016)
- Doomben 10,000 (1) - Boban (2015)
- Doomben Cup (4) - Metal Bender (2010); Beaten Up (2013); Comin' Through (2018); Birdman (2026)
- Empire Rose Stakes (4) - Red Tracer (2013); Shillelagh (2018); Atishu (2024); Lady Shenandoah (2026)
- Epsom Handicap (7) - Boban (2013); He's Your Man (2014); Winx (2015); Kolding (2019); Rediener (2023); Autumn Glow (2025); God's Window (2026)
- Flight Stakes (3) - Funstar (2019); Zougotcha (2022); Lady Shenandoah (2024)
- The Galaxy (2) - Shellscrape (2010); Nature Strip (2019)
- George Ryder Stakes (8) - Danleigh (2010); Rangirangdoo (2011); Metal Bender (2012); Winx (2016); Winx (2017); Winx (2018); Winx (2019); Autumn Glow (2026)
- Golden Rose Stakes (4) - Zoustar (2013); The Autumn Sun (2018); Militarize (2023); Beiwacht (2025)
- Golden Slipper (1) - Shinzo (2023)
- J. J. Atkins (4) - Pressday (2010); Press Statement (2015); The Autumn Sun (2018); Tron Bolt (2026)
- King Charles III Stakes (10) - Shoot Out (2012); Sacred Falls (2014); Kermadec (2015); Winx (2016); Winx (2017); Winx (2018); Kolding (2020); Verry Elleegant (2021); Fangirl (2023); Autumn Glow (2026)
- Kingsford-Smith Cup (1) - Joliestar (2025)
- King's Stand Stakes (1) - Nature Strip (2022)
- Kingston Town Classic (1) - Moriarty (2014)
- Lightning Stakes (2) - Nature Strip (2021); Home Affairs (2022)
- Makybe Diva Stakes (1) - Foreteller (2013)
- Manikato Stakes (1) - Danleigh (2009)
- Melbourne Cup (1) - Verry Elleegant (2021)
- Memsie Stakes (2) - Boban (2015), Beiwacht (2026)
- The Metropolitan (6) - The Verminator (2011); Opinion (2014); Patrick Erin (2018); Come Play With Me (2019); No Compromise (2022); Land Legend (2024)
- Moir Stakes (1) - Nature Strip (2019)
- Newmarket Handicap (2) - Brazen Beau (2015); Joliestar (2025)
- Queen Elizabeth Stakes (6) - My Kingdom of Fife (2011); Reliable Man (2013); Winx (2017); Winx (2018); Winx (2019); Via Sistina (2025)
- Queen of the Turf Stakes (4) - Foxwedge (2017); Atishu (2023); Zougotcha (2024); Fangirl (2025)
- Queensland Derby (4) - Hawkspur (2013); Kukeracha (2021); Kovalica (2023); Providence (2026)
- Queensland Oaks (3) - Winx (2015); Egg Tart (2017); Youngstar (2018)
- Railway Stakes (1) - Good Project (2015)
- Randwick Guineas (1) - The Autumn Sun (2018)
- Ranvet Stakes (5) - Foreteller (2013), Verry Elleegant (2021), Via Sistina (2024), Via Sistina (2025), Aeliana (2026)
- Rosehill Guineas (5) - D'Argento (2018); The Autumn Sun (2019); Lindermann (2023), Riff Rocket (2024), Autumn Boy (2026)
- Sir Rupert Clarke Stakes (1) - Angel Capital (2026)
- Sires' Produce Stakes (2) - Militarize (2023); Campione D'Italia (2026)
- Spring Champion Stakes (1) - Vanbrugh (2015)
- Surround Stakes (2) - Hinged (2022); Lady Shenandoah (2025)
- Sydney Cup (5) - Stand to Gain (2011); Grand Marshal (2015); Who Shot Thebarman (2018); Shraaoh (2019); Selino (2021)
- Tancred Stakes - (3) Preferment (2016); Verry Elleegant (2020); Aeliana (2026)
- Tattersall's Tiara (2) - Red Tracer (2013); Invincibella (2019)
- Thousand Guineas (3) - Amicus (2014); Madame Pommery (2022); Joliestar (2023)
- TJ Smith Stakes (4) - Nature Strip (2020); Nature Strip (2021); Nature Strip (2022); Joliestar (2026)
- Toorak Handicap (1) - Lady Shenandoah (2026)
- Turnbull Stakes (6) - Preferment (2015); Winx (2017); Winx (2018); Kings Will Dream (2019); Verry Elleegant (2020); Via Sistina (2024)
- Underwood Stakes (3) - Foreteller (2013); Buckaroo (2024); Birdman (2026)
- Victoria Derby (4) - Preferment (2014); Manzoice (2022); Riff Rocket (2023); Stormy Marco (2026)
- Vinery Stud Stakes (3) - Verry Elleegant (2019); Hungry Heart (2021); Fangirl (2022)
- William Reid Stakes (1) - September Run (2022)
- Winx Stakes (6) - Winx (2018); Verry Elleegant (2020); Fangirl (2023); Via Sistina (2024); Via Sistina (2025); Autumn Glow (2026)

== See also ==
- Thoroughbred racing in Australia
- Thoroughbred racing in New Zealand
