= Golden Eagle (horse race) =

- Class: Group 1
- Location: Rosehill Racecourse (2019-2024); Randwick Racecourse (2025-)
- Inaugurated: 2019
- Race type: Thoroughbred flat
- Website: www.australianturfclub.com.au

Race information
- Distance: 1,500 metres
- Surface: Turf
- Track: Right-handed
- Qualification: Four-year olds
- Purse: $10 million (2026)

The Golden Eagle is an Australian Turf Club thoroughbred horse race run over 1,500 metres on turf at Randwick Racecourse in Sydney, Australia on the last Saturday in October. From its inaugural running in 2019 through 2025, the Golden Eagle was held as a Special Conditions race. Following a sweeping review of Australia's black-type system by the Asian Pattern Committee, the race was officially elevated to Group 1 status ahead of the 2026 racing season.

== History ==
Run for the first time at Rosehill Racecourse in 2019, with prizemoney of $10 million, it is the world's second richest race on turf after The Everest. The Melbourne Cup and the Prix de l'Arc de Triomphe are third and fourth richest. It is planned that 10% of $10 million prize fund will be donated to charity. Each runner nominates a charity that has been accredited with Racing NSW.

It is open to four-year-olds at set-weight conditions. In 2025, it will move to Randwick Racecourse.

== 2019 Golden Eagle ==
The inaugural $7.5m Golden Eagle was won by the Chris Waller trained Kolding underneath in-form hoop Glen Boss.

Kolding, a last-start winner of the Epsom Handicap, he was sent out as an equal second-favourite at $6 and he confirmed his status as an elite galloper with an authoritative win over a gallant Sunlight, with Mizzy narrowly holding on for third over Behemoth.

Race favourite Arcadia Queen ($3.30) had her chance but couldn't match motors with the winner, finishing fifth in the 16-horse field.

Last place went the way of Gem Song ($61) who finished 47L in arrears of the winner.

== Winners ==
Year	Winner	Gender	Jockey	Trainer(s)	Owner(s)	Time	2nd	3rd
2019	Kolding (NZ)	Gelding	Glen Boss	Chris Waller	Neville Morgan	1:28.28	Sunlight	Mizzy
2020	Colette	Mare	Koby Jennings	James Cummings	Godolphin	1:32.67	Icebath (NZ)	Dawn Passage
2021	I'm Thunderstruck (NZ)	Gelding	Hugh Bowman	Mike Price & Michael Kent, Jr	O T I Racing et al	1:27.90	Count De Rupee	Vangelic
2022	I Wish I Win (NZ)	Gelding	Luke Nolen	Peter Moody	Mark Chittick & Peter Moody	1:28.19	Fangirl	Gypsy Goddess (NZ)
2023	Obamburumai (Jpn)	Colt	Joshua Parr	Keiji Yoshimura	Koji Oka	1:29.26	Pericles	Golden Mile
2024	Lake Forest (GB)	Colt	Cieren Fallon	William Haggas	Tony Bloom & Ian McAleavy	1:27.98	Lazzat (Fra)	Tom Kitten
2025	Autumn Glow	Mare	James McDonald	Chris Waller	Arrowfield Pastoral Pty Ltd (Mgr: J M Messara) & Hermitage (Mgr: Ms S M Clarke)	1:29.72	Sepals	Evaporate
2026	Skyhook	Stallion	Chad Schofield	Gerald Ryan & Sterling Alexiou	Ryan & Alexiou Racing (G A Ryan), Stallion Match (M Ennis), The Big 4 Racing (M W Lowe), South Arm (J A Kennedy), J B Plozza, J F Townley, Ms L Coghlan, I C Burford, Mrs M A Burford, Legacy Thoroughbreds (D F Macaskill), Tripp Racing (Mrs C M Tripp), T Carroll, M T Tripp, M A Stevens & N J Lovett	1:26.64 (Track record)	Decorum	Beiwacht

== See also ==
- All-Star Mile
- The Everest
- List of Australian Group races
