= Autumn Glow =

Australian thoroughbred racehorse

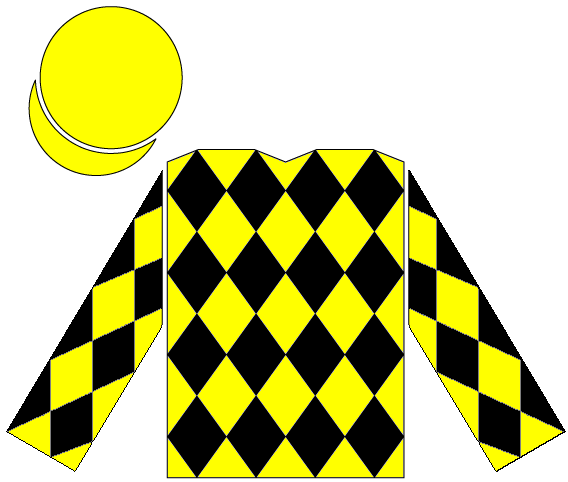
- Racing colours of Arrowfield Stud
- Sire: The Autumn Sun
- Grandsire: Redoute's Choice
- Dam: Via Africa
- Damsire: Var
- Sex: Mare
- Foaled: 11 August 2021
- Country: Australia
- Colour: Bay
- Breeder: Newhaven Park Stud
- Owner: Arrowfield Stud
- Trainer: Chris Waller
- Jockey: James McDonald
- Record: 15: 14-0-1
- Earnings: A$13,821,600

Major wins
- Up and Coming Stakes (2024); Tea Rose Stakes (2024); Toy Show Quality (2025); Theo Marks Stakes (2025); Epsom Handicap (2025); Golden Eagle (2025); Apollo Stakes (2026); Verry Elleegant Stakes (2026); George Ryder Stakes (2026); Winx Stakes (2026); King Charles III Stakes (2026)

Awards
- Australian Champion Racehorse of the Year (2025/26); Australian Champion Middle Distance Racehorse (2025/26)

Autumn Glow (foaled 11 August 2021) is a multiple Group 1 winning Australian Thoroughbred racehorse.

== Background ==
Autumn Glow was bred by Newhaven Park Stud in the South Western Slopes of New South Wales. She is out of the former South African Champion Sprinter in “Via Africa”, who has also produced the Group 1 winner “In The Congo” who was successful in the Golden Rose Stakes.

Autumn Glow was originally purchased for A$600,000 at the Magic Millions weanling sale by Silverdale Farm and Shrone Bloodstock. A year later she was sold at the Inglis Easter Sale for A$1,800,000 to Arrowfield Stud.

== Pedigree ==
Pedigree of Autumn Glow (AUS) 2021
Sire The Autumn Sun (AUS) 2015	Redoute's Choice (AUS); 1996	Danehill	Danzig
Sire The Autumn Sun (AUS) 2015	Redoute's Choice (AUS); 1996	Danehill	Razyana
Sire The Autumn Sun (AUS) 2015	Redoute's Choice (AUS); 1996	Shanthas Choice	Canny Lad
Sire The Autumn Sun (AUS) 2015	Redoute's Choice (AUS); 1996	Shanthas Choice	Dancing Show
Sire The Autumn Sun (AUS) 2015	Azmiyna (IRE); 2010	Galileo	Sadler's Wells
Sire The Autumn Sun (AUS) 2015	Azmiyna (IRE); 2010	Galileo	Urban Sea
Sire The Autumn Sun (AUS) 2015	Azmiyna (IRE); 2010	Asmara	Lear Fan
Sire The Autumn Sun (AUS) 2015	Azmiyna (IRE); 2010	Asmara	Anaza
Dam Via Africa (SAF) 2009	Var (USA); 1999	Forest Wildcat	Storm Cat
Dam Via Africa (SAF) 2009	Var (USA); 1999	Forest Wildcat	Victoria Beauty
Dam Via Africa (SAF) 2009	Var (USA); 1999	Loma Preata	Zilzal
Dam Via Africa (SAF) 2009	Var (USA); 1999	Loma Preata	Halleys Comeback
Dam Via Africa (SAF) 2009	Bump 'N Grind (SAF); 2002	Qui Danzig	Danzig
Dam Via Africa (SAF) 2009	Bump 'N Grind (SAF); 2002	Qui Danzig	Qui Royalty
Dam Via Africa (SAF) 2009	Bump 'N Grind (SAF); 2002	College Girl	Quick Turnover
Dam Via Africa (SAF) 2009	Bump 'N Grind (SAF); 2002	College Girl	Bombshell
