= Bill Ritchie Handicap =

- Class: Group 3
- Location: Randwick Racecourse, Sydney, Australia
- Inaugurated: 1867 (as AJC Squatters' Handicap)
- Race type: Thoroughbred - flat
- Sponsor: Hope Research (2026)

Race information
- Distance: 1,400 metres
- Surface: Turf
- Track: Right-handed
- Qualification: Horses three years old and older
- Weight: Quality handicap
- Purse: A$250,000 (2026)
- Bonuses: Winner exemption from a ballot on the Epsom Handicap

The Bill Ritchie Handicap is an Australian Turf Club Group 3 Thoroughbred open quality handicap horse race for horses three years old and older, over a distance of 1400 metres, held annually at Randwick Racecourse, Sydney, Australia in September.

== History ==
Originally the race was known as the AJC Squatters' Handicap, which was run as early as 1867. The race was renamed in 1994 after the New South Wales racehorse owner-breeder Bill Ritchie.

=== Venue ===
- 1980–1990 - Rosehill Gardens Racecourse
- 2002–2003 - Randwick Racecourse
- 2005–2010 - Warwick Farm Racecourse
- 2011 - Rosehill Gardens Racecourse
- 2012 onwards - Randwick Racecourse

=== Grade ===
- 1979–1997 - Listed Race
- 1998 onwards - Group 3

== Winners ==
The following are past winners of the race.

- 2026 - General Salute
- 2025 - With Your Blessing
- 2024 - McHale
- 2023 - Rediener
- 2022 - Top Ranked
- 2021 - Atishu
- 2020 - Probabeel
- 2019 - Kolding
- 2018 - Siege Of Quebec
- 2017 - Comin' Through
- 2016 - Sons Of John
- 2015 - Sadler's Lake
- 2014 - Manawanui
- 2013 - Boban
- 2012 - Steps In Time
- 2011 - Thankgodyourehere
- 2010 - Drumbeats
- 2009 - McClintock
- 2008 - Judged
- 2007 - †race not held
- 2006 - Coalesce
- 2005 - Flaming
- 2004 - Osca Warrior
- 2003 - Zabarra
- 2002 - Zabarra
- 2001 - Fouardee
- 2000 - Landsighting
- 1999 - Brave Prince
- 1998 - Bezeal Bay
- 1997 - Holy Roller
- 1996 - Mamzelle Pedrille
- 1995 - Monopolize
- 1994 - Rouslan
- 1993 - Belas Knap
- 1992 - Prince Of Praise
- 1991 - Rechabite
- 1990 - Our Poverty Bay
- 1989 - Royal Reel
- 1988 - Pleasant Flight
- 1987 - Royal Reel
- 1986 - Full Page
- 1985 - Dinky Flyer
- 1984 - Muffler
- 1983 - Leica Planet
- 1982 - Note Of Victory
- 1981 - Gooree Pride
- 1980 - Tulip Town
- 1979 - Drummer
- 1978 - Go Mod

† Not held because of outbreak of equine influenza

== See also ==
- Kingston Town Stakes
- Tea Rose Stakes
- the Shorts
- List of Australian Group races
- Group races
