= Kolding (horse) =

New Zealand-bred Thoroughbred racehorse

- Sire: Ocean Park
- Grandsire: Thorn Park
- Dam: Magic Star
- Damsire: Danzero
- Sex: Gelding
- Foaled: 3 November 2015
- Country: New Zealand
- Colour: Brown
- Breeder: Warren Pegg
- Owner: Neville Morgan
- Trainer: Chris Waller
- Jockey: Glen Boss
- Record: 48: 11–5–4
- Earnings: AU$6,696,950

Major wins
- Queensland Guineas (2019); Bill Ritchie Handicap (2019); Epsom Handicap (2019); Golden Eagle (2019); George Main Stakes (2020); Hill Stakes (2020); All Aged Stakes (2021)

Kolding (foaled 3 November 2015) is a retired New Zealand bred and Australian trained thoroughbred racehorse that has won three Group I races, as well as the inaugural running of the Golden Eagle in 2020.

== Background ==
Kolding was purchased for $170,000 at the 2017 New Zealand Premier Yearling Sale. He is a half-brother to Sampson, winner of the Trentham Stakes, Awapuni Gold Cup and New Zealand St. Leger.

== Racing career ==
Kolding was defeated in his first three races however won at his fourth attempt on the 23 January 2019 at Canterbury when ridden by Hugh Bowman.

On the 8 June 2019, Kolding contested his first stakes race in the Queensland Guineas at Eagle Farm. Ridden by James McDonald he came from fourth-last to win by half a length. After the race trainer Chris Waller said, "I think he's the right horse to go through to the spring – an Epsom type of horse, in my opinion."

Kolding went on to win the Epsom four months later and then at his next start won the first running of the Golden Eagle, collecting over $4,000,000 in prize-money.

Kolding's two other Group 1 victories were the 2020 George Main Stakes and the 2021 All Aged Stakes.

== Pedigree ==
Pedigree of Kolding (NZ) 2015
Sire Ocean Park (NZ) 2008	Thorn Park (AUS); 1999	Spinning World	Nureyev
Sire Ocean Park (NZ) 2008	Thorn Park (AUS); 1999	Spinning World	Imperfect Circle
Sire Ocean Park (NZ) 2008	Thorn Park (AUS); 1999	Joy	Bluebird
Sire Ocean Park (NZ) 2008	Thorn Park (AUS); 1999	Joy	Christmas Spirit
Sire Ocean Park (NZ) 2008	Sayyida (NZ); 2000	Zabeel	Sir Tristram
Sire Ocean Park (NZ) 2008	Sayyida (NZ); 2000	Zabeel	Lady Giselle
Sire Ocean Park (NZ) 2008	Sayyida (NZ); 2000	Eastern Princess	Pompeii Court
Sire Ocean Park (NZ) 2008	Sayyida (NZ); 2000	Eastern Princess	Benazir
Dam Magic Star (AUS) 2003	Danzero (AUS); 1991	Danehill	Danzig
Dam Magic Star (AUS) 2003	Danzero (AUS); 1991	Danehill	Razyana
Dam Magic Star (AUS) 2003	Danzero (AUS); 1991	Confidentially	Kaoru Star
Dam Magic Star (AUS) 2003	Danzero (AUS); 1991	Confidentially	Idesa
Dam Magic Star (AUS) 2003	This Way Up (AUS); 1988	Semipalatinsk	Nodouble
Dam Magic Star (AUS) 2003	This Way Up (AUS); 1988	Semipalatinsk	School Board
Dam Magic Star (AUS) 2003	This Way Up (AUS); 1988	Upside Down	Head Over Heels
Dam Magic Star (AUS) 2003	This Way Up (AUS); 1988	Upside Down	Young Malty
