= Tea Rose Stakes =

- Class: Group 2
- Location: Randwick Racecourse, Sydney, Australia
- Inaugurated: 1980
- Race type: Thoroughbred - flat
- Sponsor: Grand Burge (2026)

Race information
- Distance: 1,400 metres
- Surface: Turf
- Track: Right-handed
- Qualification: Three year old fillies
- Weight: Set weights
- Purse: A$300,000 (2026)

The Tea Rose Stakes is an Australian Turf Club Group 2 Thoroughbred horse race, for three-year-old fillies, at set weights, over a distance of 1400 metres, held annually at Randwick Racecourse, Sydney, Australia in September.

== History ==
The Tea Rose Stakes is part of the Princess Series of races which also includes the Silver Shadow Stakes, Furious Stakes, and Flight Stakes.

=== Distance ===
- 1980–1984 - 1400 metres
- 1985–1990 - 1500 metres
- 1991 - 1550 metres
- 1992–2012 - 1500 metres
- 2013 onwards - 1400 metres

=== Venue ===
- 1980–1990 - Rosehill Gardens Racecourse
- 1991 - Canterbury Park Racecourse
- 1992–2011 - Rosehill Gardens Racecourse
- 2012 onwards - Randwick Racecourse

=== Grade ===
- 1980–1982 - Listed Race
- 1983–1984 - Group 3
- 1985 onwards - Group 2

== Winners ==
The following are past winners of the race.

- 2026 - Bangkok Hottie
- 2025 - Apocalyptic
- 2024 - Autumn Glow
- 2023 - Tiz Invincible
- 2022 - Zougotcha
- 2021 - Four Moves Ahead
- 2020 - Dame Giselle
- 2019 - Funstar
- 2018 - Miss Fabulass
- 2017 - Alizee
- 2016 - Foxplay
- 2015 - Pearls
- 2014 - First Seal
- 2013 - Guelph
- 2012 - Longport
- 2011 - Streama
- 2010 - More Strawberries
- 2009 - More Joyous
- 2008 - Samantha Miss
- 2007 - †race not held
- 2006 - Cheeky Choice
- 2005 - Mnemosyne
- 2004 - Prisoner Of Love
- 2003 - Shamekha
- 2002 - Victory Vein
- 2001 - Ha Ha
- 2000 - Unworldly
- 1999 - Danglissa
- 1998 - Sunline
- 1997 - Stella Cadente
- 1996 - Assertive Lass
- 1995 - Pontal Lass
- 1994 - Danarani
- 1993 - Angst
- 1992 - Burst
- 1991 - Bold Promise
- 1990 - Whisked
- 1989 - Tristanagh
- 1988 - Glenview
- 1987 - Glory Girl
- 1986 - Evandale Star
- 1985 - Shinikima
- 1984 - Premier Flight
- 1983 - Sabre Dancer
- 1982 - Emancipation
- 1981 - Black Shoes
- 1980 - Dark Eclipse

† Not held because of outbreak of equine influenza

== See also ==
- Bill Ritchie Handicap
- Kingston Town Stakes
- The Shorts
- List of Australian Group races
- Group races
