= King Charles III Stakes (Australia) =

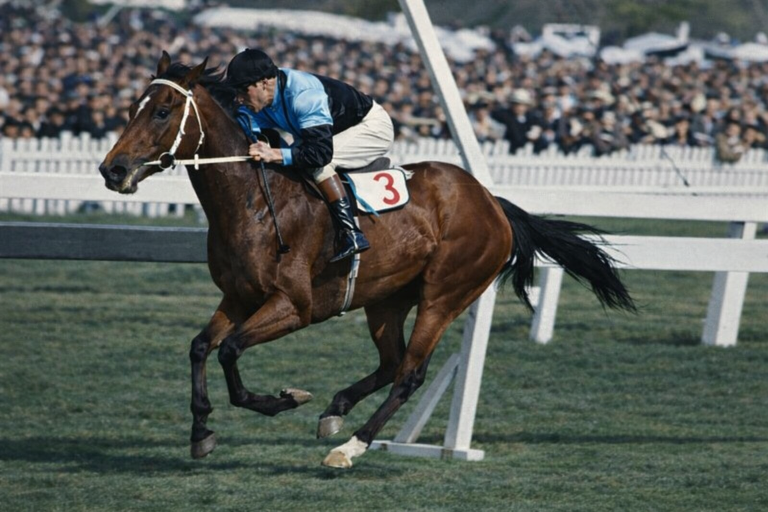
- Shannon, 1946 and 1947 winner
- Class: Group 1
- Location: Randwick Racecourse, Sydney, Australia
- Inaugurated: 1945
- Race type: Thoroughbred - flat

Race information
- Distance: 1,609 metres
- Surface: Turf
- Track: Right-handed
- Qualification: Horses three years old and older
- Weight: Weight for Age
- Purse: A$5,000,000 (2026)
- Bonuses: Winner exemption from a ballot on the Epsom Handicap

The King Charles III Stakes (formerly known as the George Main Stakes), is an Australian Turf Club Group 1 Thoroughbred horse race run under Weight for Age conditions, over a distance of 1609 metres at Randwick Racecourse, Sydney, Australia in October.

== History ==
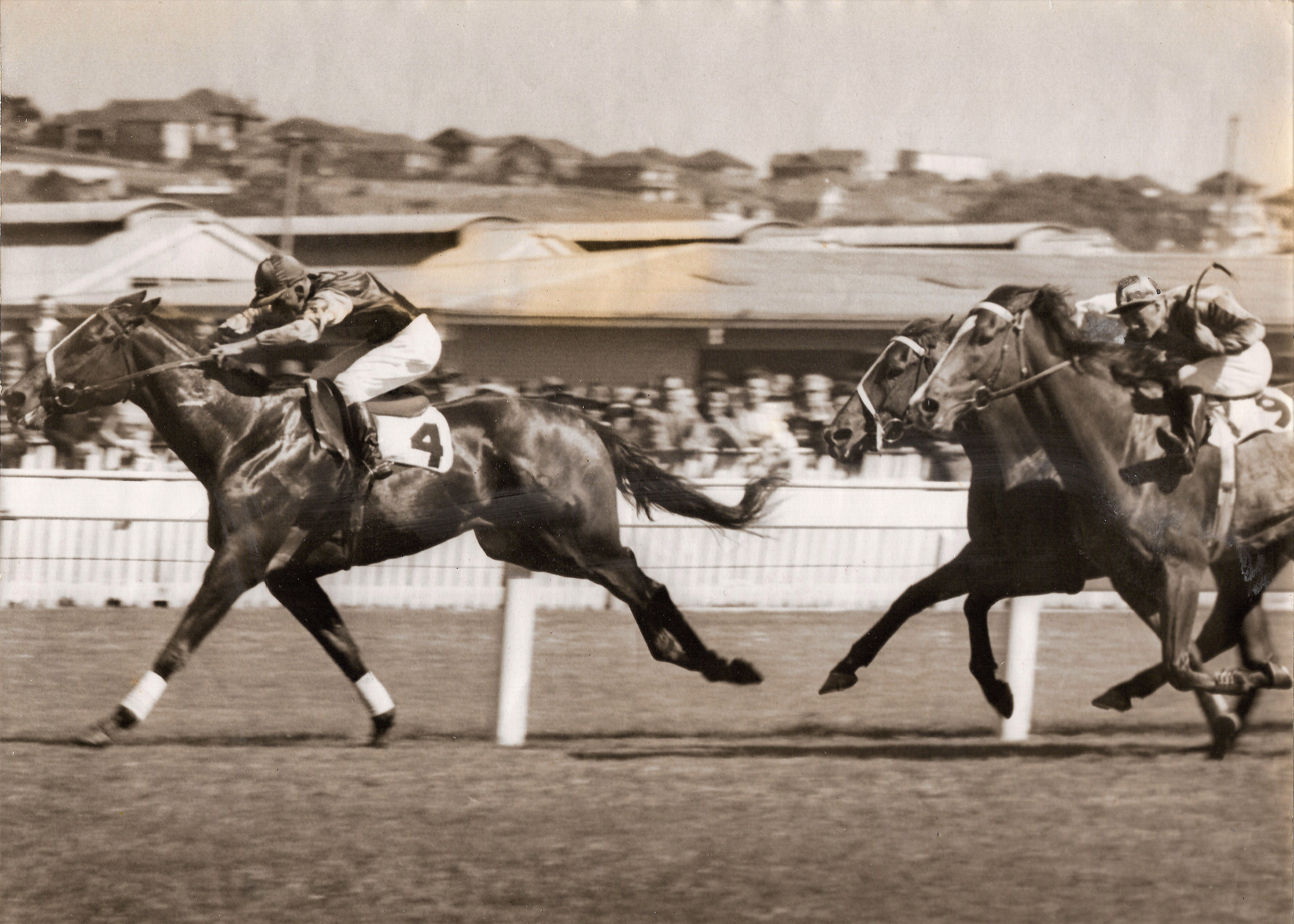
San Domenico & Arthur Ward, 1950 winner

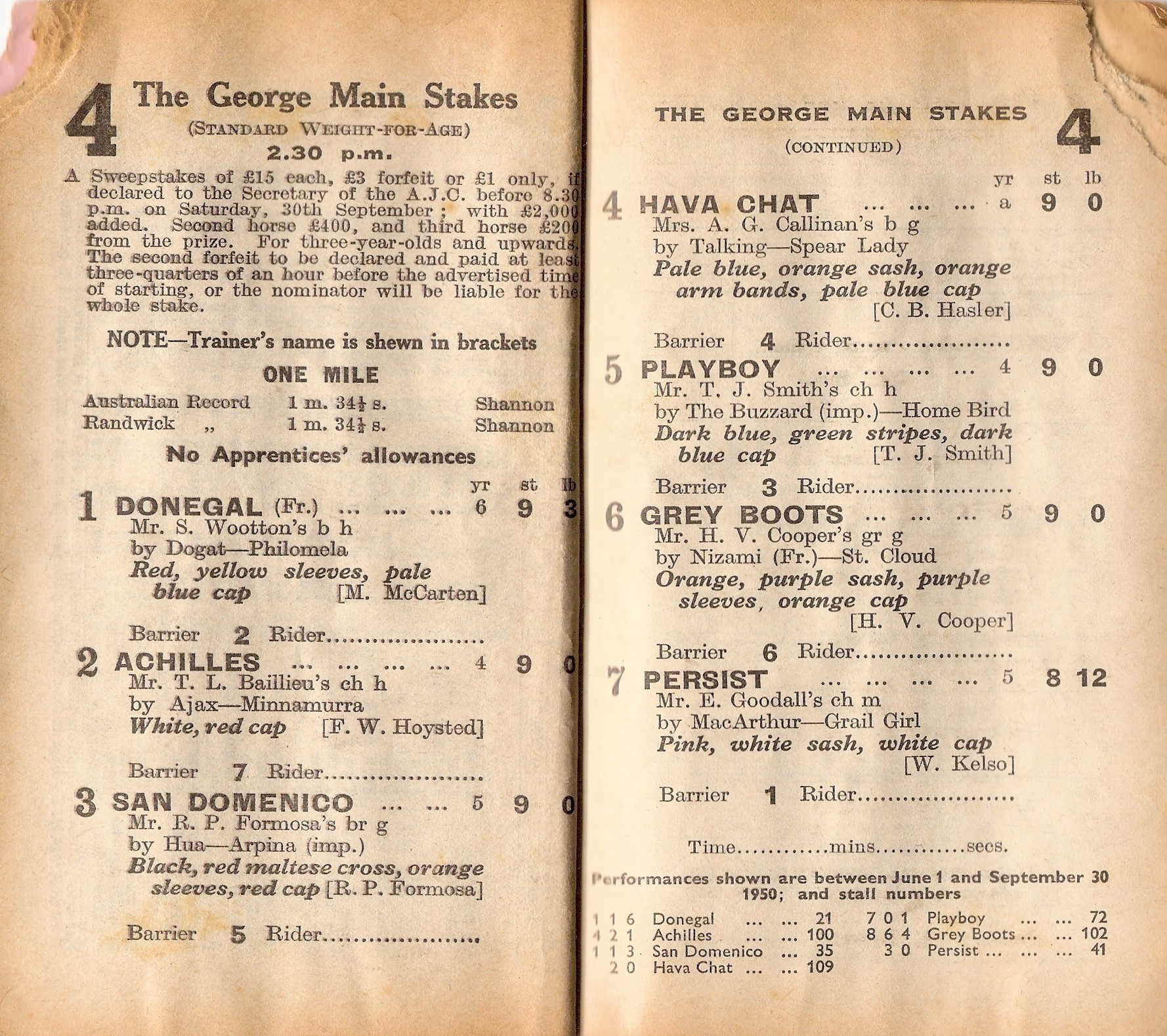
1950 AJC George Main Stakes racebook

The race was named after George Main, a former chairman of the Australian Jockey Club. Main lived with his wife Mary on Retreat, a grazing property at Illabo, west of Cootamundra on the southwest slopes of New South Wales. He bred racehorses and ran sheep.
The winner of the King Charles III Stakes is exempt from a ballot on the Epsom Handicap, and horses who run well often head for the Epsom. The race was renamed in honour of Charles III in July 2023.

=== Name ===
- 2015–2019 Colgate Optic White Stakes

=== Grade ===
- 1945–1978 - Principal Race
- 1979 onwards - Group 1

=== Distance ===
- 1945–1971 – 1 mile
- 1972-2024 - 1600 metres
- 2025 onwards - 1609 metres

=== Records ===
- Winx (2017) – 1:33.65
- Legendary trainer T.J. Smith won this event eleven times.

=== 1955 Racebook ===
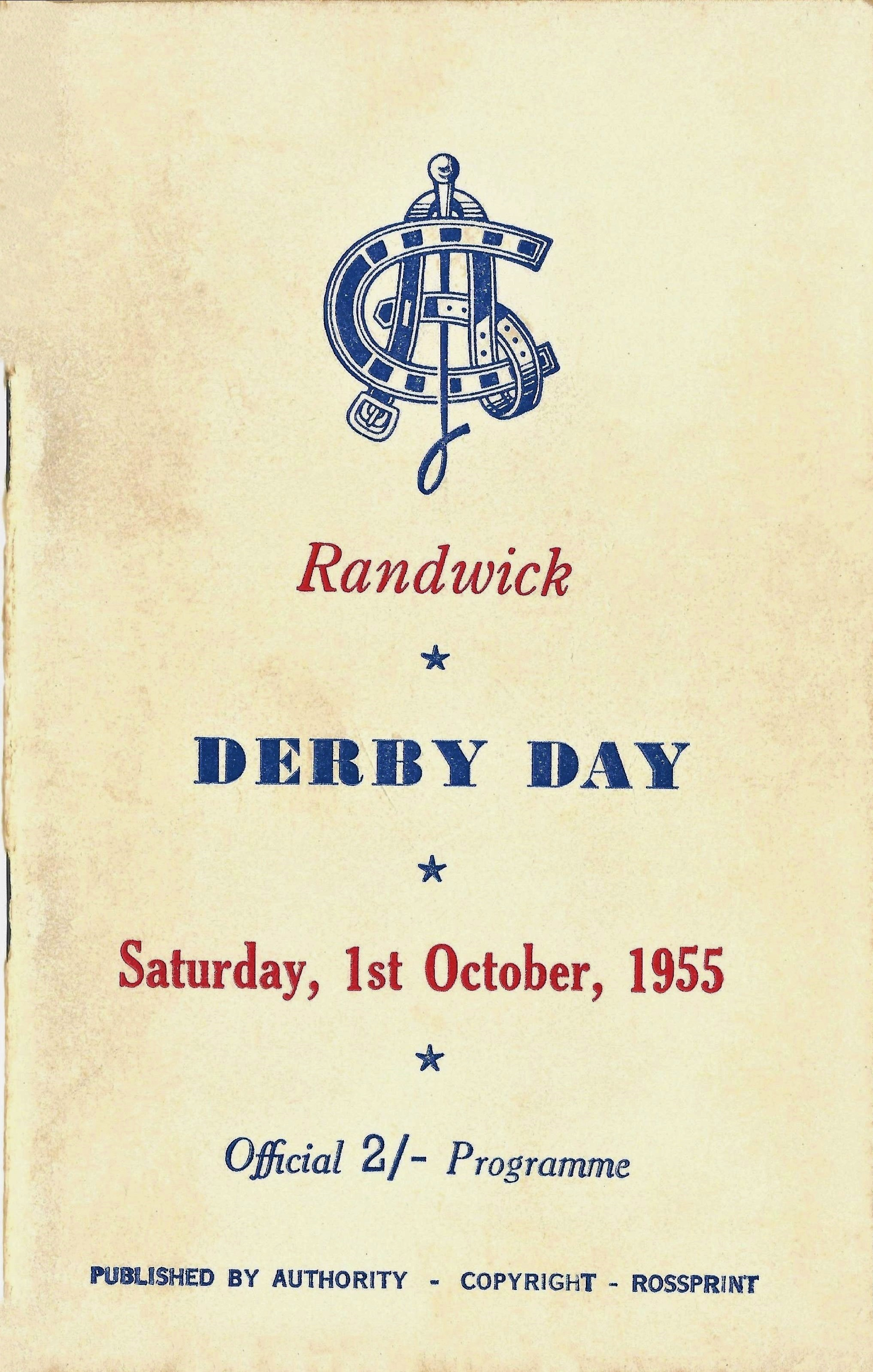
1955 AJC Derby racebook front cover

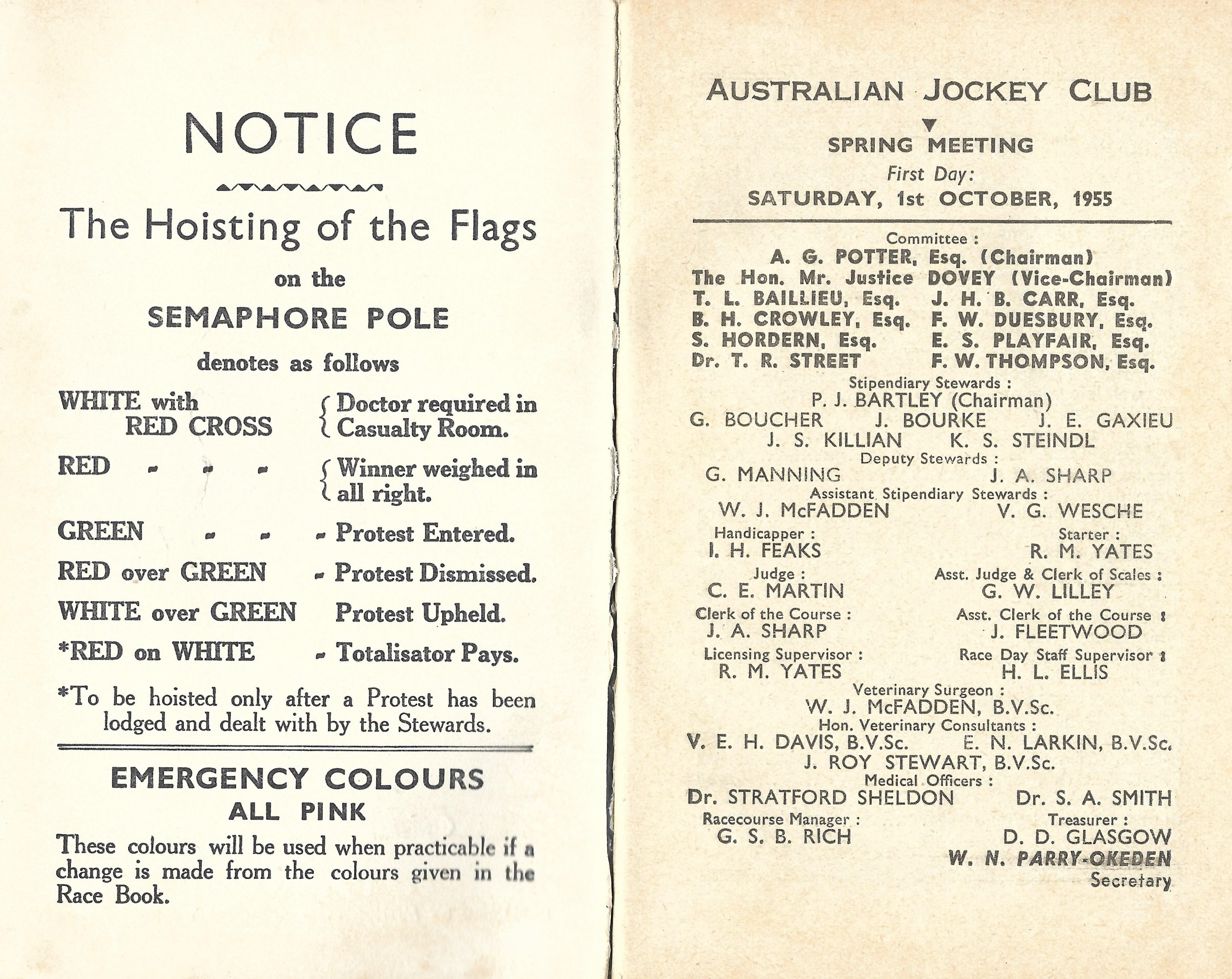
1955 AJC Derby racebook showing raceday officials

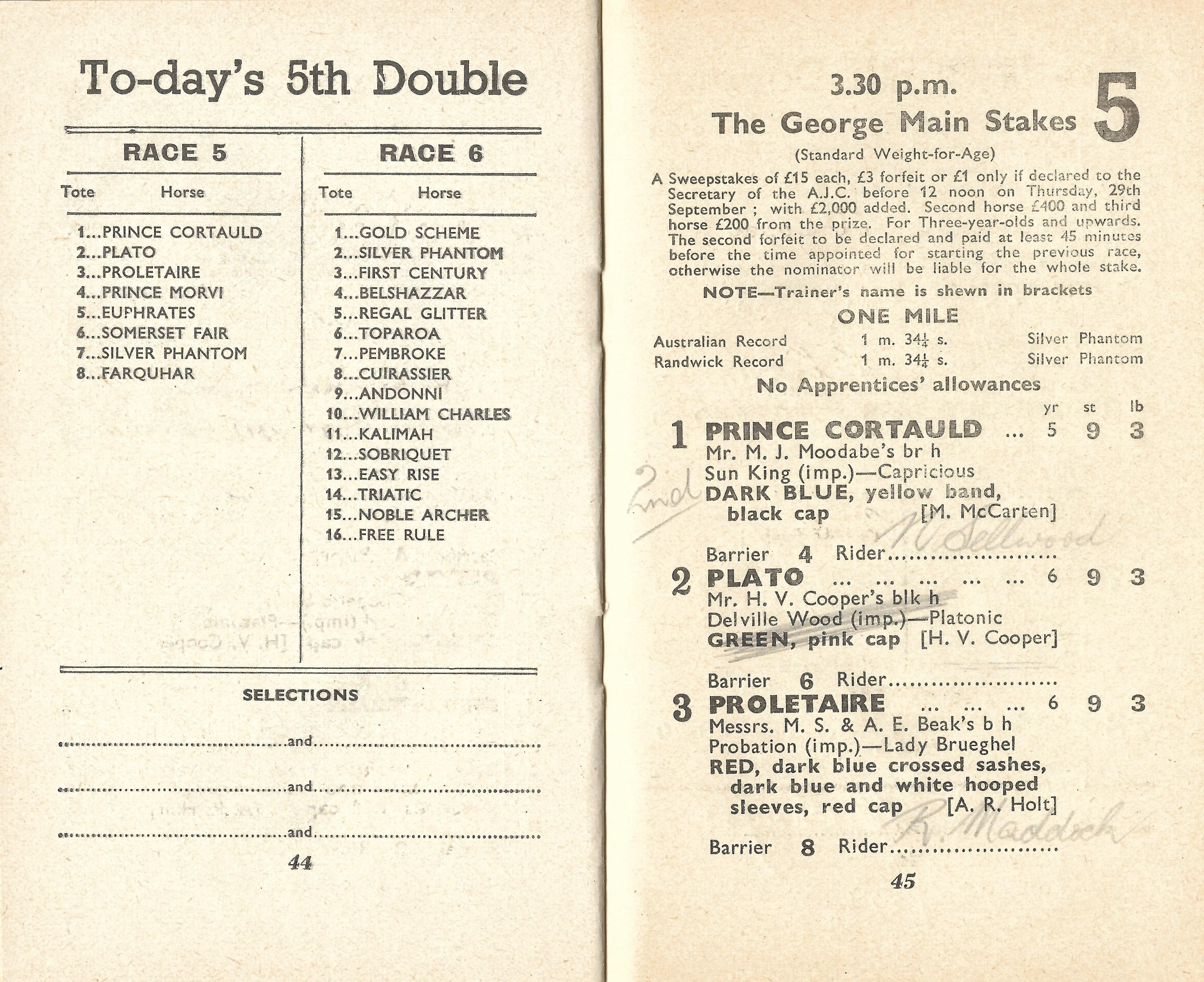
1955 AJC George Main Stakes starters and results

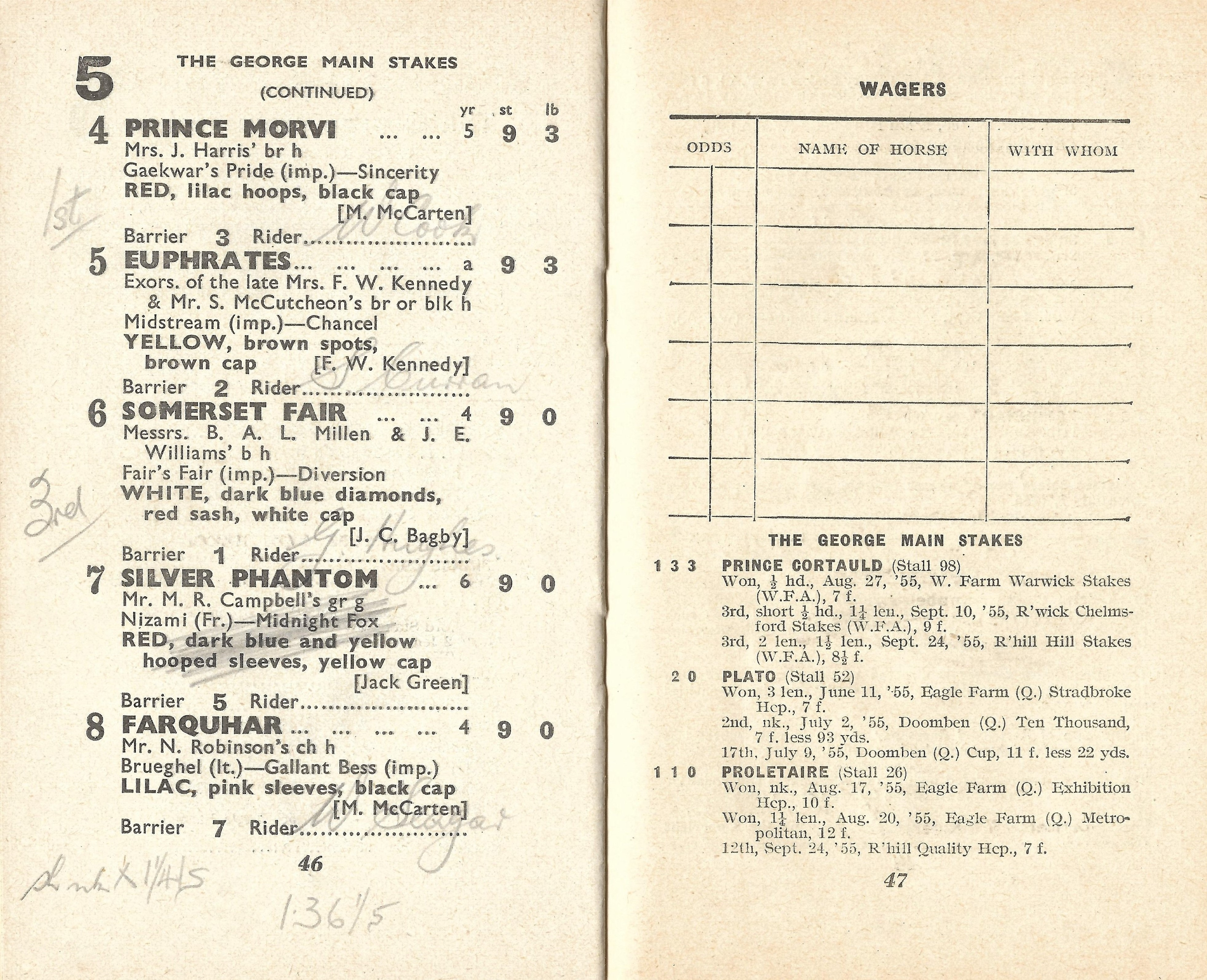
1955 AJC George Main Stakes racebook page showing the winner, Prince Morvi

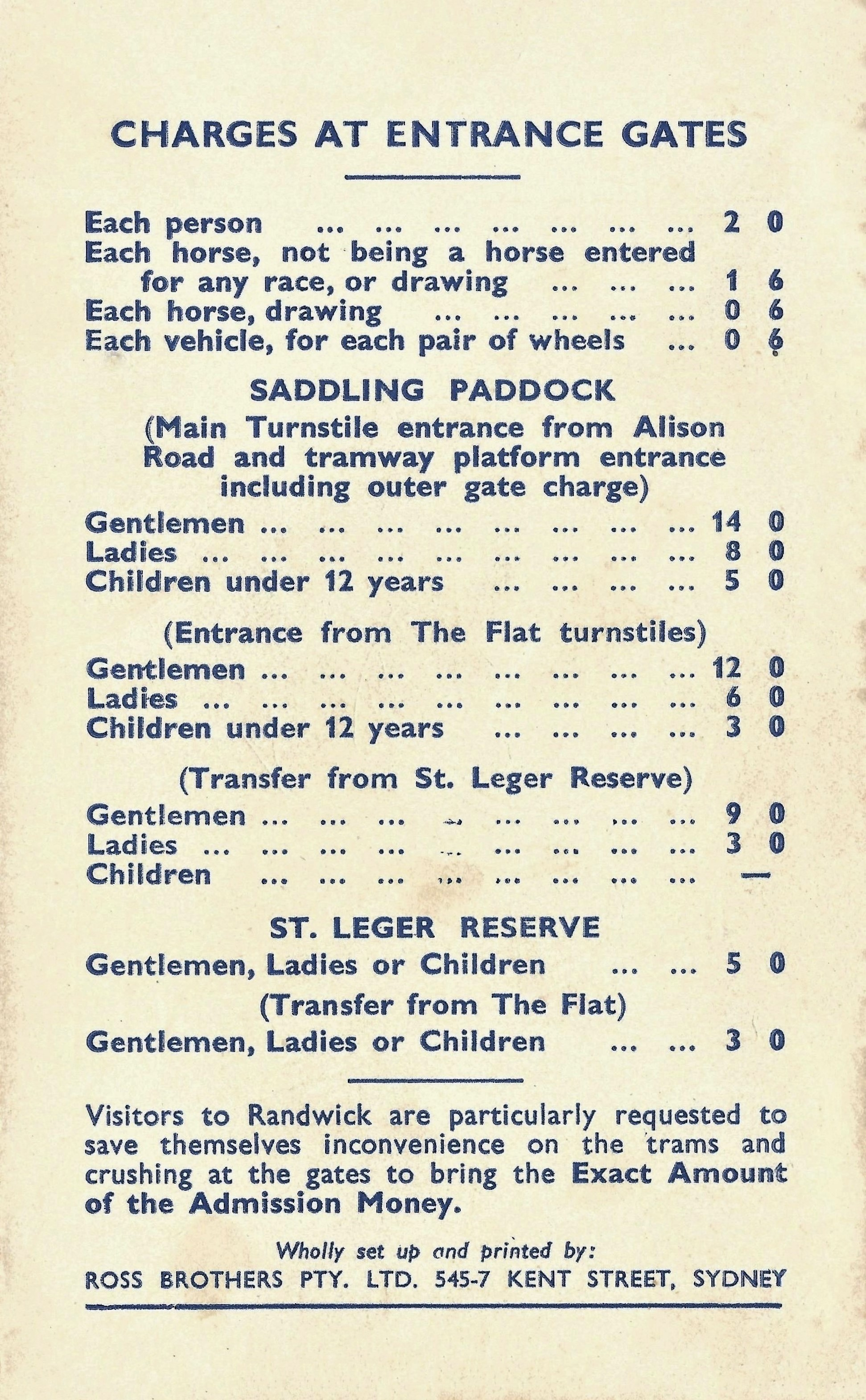
1955 AJC Derby back cover showing charges at the entrance gates

== Winners ==
The following are past winners of the race.

- 2026 - Autumn Glow
- 2025 - Ceolwulf
- 2024 - Ceolwulf
- 2023 - Fangirl
- 2022 - Anamoe
- 2021 - Verry Elleegant
- 2020 - Kolding
- 2019 - Avilius
- 2018 - Winx
- 2017 - Winx
- 2016 - Winx
- 2015 - Kermadec
- 2014 - Sacred Falls
- 2013 - Streama
- 2012 - Shoot Out
- 2011 - Sincero
- 2010 - More Joyous
- 2009 - Road To Rock
- 2008 - Mentality
- 2007 - †race not held
- 2006 - Racing to Win
- 2005 - Mr Celebrity
- 2004 - Grand Armee
- 2003 - Lonhro
- 2002 - Defier
- 2001 - Viscount
- 2000 - Adam
- 1999 - Shogun Lodge
- 1998 - Dracula
- 1997 - Encounter
- 1996 - Juggler
- 1995 - Turridu
- 1994 - Durbridge
- 1993 - March Hare
- 1992 - Coronation Day
- 1991 - Planet Ruler
- 1990 - Shaftesbury Avenue
- 1989 - Vo Rogue
- 1988 - Gennaker
- 1987 - Campaign King
- 1986 - Ma Chiquita
- 1985 - Roman Artist
- 1984 - Inspired
- 1983 - Emancipation
- 1982 - Kingston Town
- 1981 - Kingston Town
- 1980 - Tullmax
- 1979 - Imposing
- 1978 - Party's Pride
- 1977 - Blockbuster
- 1976 - Purple Patch
- 1975 - Hartshill
- 1974 - Itchy Feet
- 1973 - All Shot
- 1972 - Nippon
- 1971 - Baguette
- 1970 - Ricochet
- 1969 - Zephyrus
- 1968 - Regal Rhythm
- 1967 - Regal Rhythm
- 1966 - Chantal
- 1965 - Count Radiant
- 1964 - Count Radiant
- 1963 - Wenona Girl
- 1962 - New Statesman
- 1961 - Martello Towers
- 1960 - Second Earl
- 1959 - Amanullah
- 1958 - Lindbergh
- 1957 - Landy
- 1956 - Kingster
- 1955 - Prince Morvi
- 1954 - Gendarme
- 1953 - Tarien
- 1952 - Montana
- 1951 - Oversight
- 1950 - San Domenico
- 1949 - The Groom
- 1948 - De La Salle
- 1947 - Shannon
- 1946 - Shannon
- 1945 - Modulation

† Not held because of outbreak of equine influenza

== See also ==
- Angst Stakes
- The Everest
- The Kosciuszko
- Reginald Allen Quality
- St Leger Stakes
- Sydney Stakes
- List of Australian Group races
- Group races
