= Epsom Handicap =

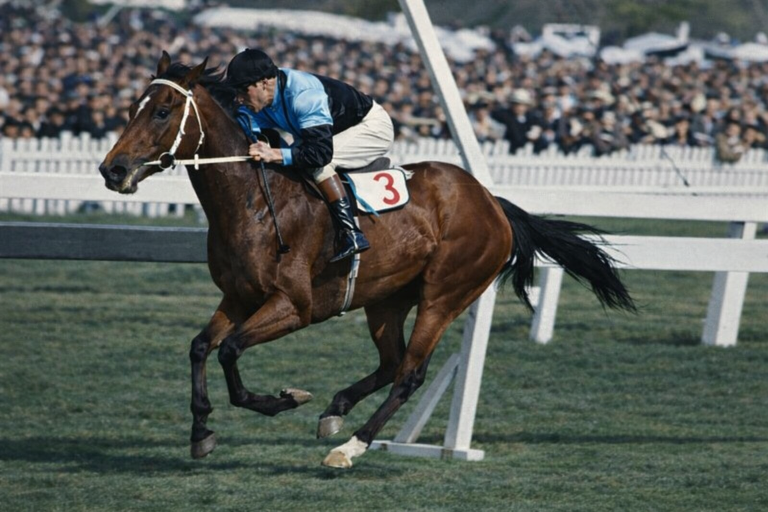
- Shannon,1945 winner
- Class: Group 1
- Location: Randwick Racecourse, Sydney, Australia
- Inaugurated: 1865
- Race type: Thoroughbred - flat
- Sponsor: TAB (2016-26)

Race information
- Distance: 1,600 metres
- Surface: Turf
- Track: Right-handed
- Qualification: Horses three years old and older
- Weight: Handicap
- Purse: A$1,500,000 (2026)
- Bonuses: Winner exemption from a ballot on the Queen Elizabeth Stakes

The Epsom Handicap is an Australian Turf Club Group 1 Thoroughbred horse race for horses three years old and older, under handicap conditions over a distance of 1,600 metres at Randwick Racecourse, Sydney, Australia in early October.

== History ==
In 1897 Jim McHugh weighing 4 stone 4 pounds (27 kg) and aged 11 years and 4 months was having his second race ride ever, on Robin Hood in the Epsom Handicap and won the race.

Jockey, Donald Nicholson won the race in succession five times from 1880 to 1884 and came fifth in 1885. He was killed a few weeks later when his mount fell in the 1885 Caulfield Cup.

It is one of the major races of the ATC Spring Carnival. Many great milers have won the race, including Chatham, Sky High, Gunsynd, and Super Impose, who was also a dual winner of the autumn equivalent, the Doncaster Handicap.

=== Name ===
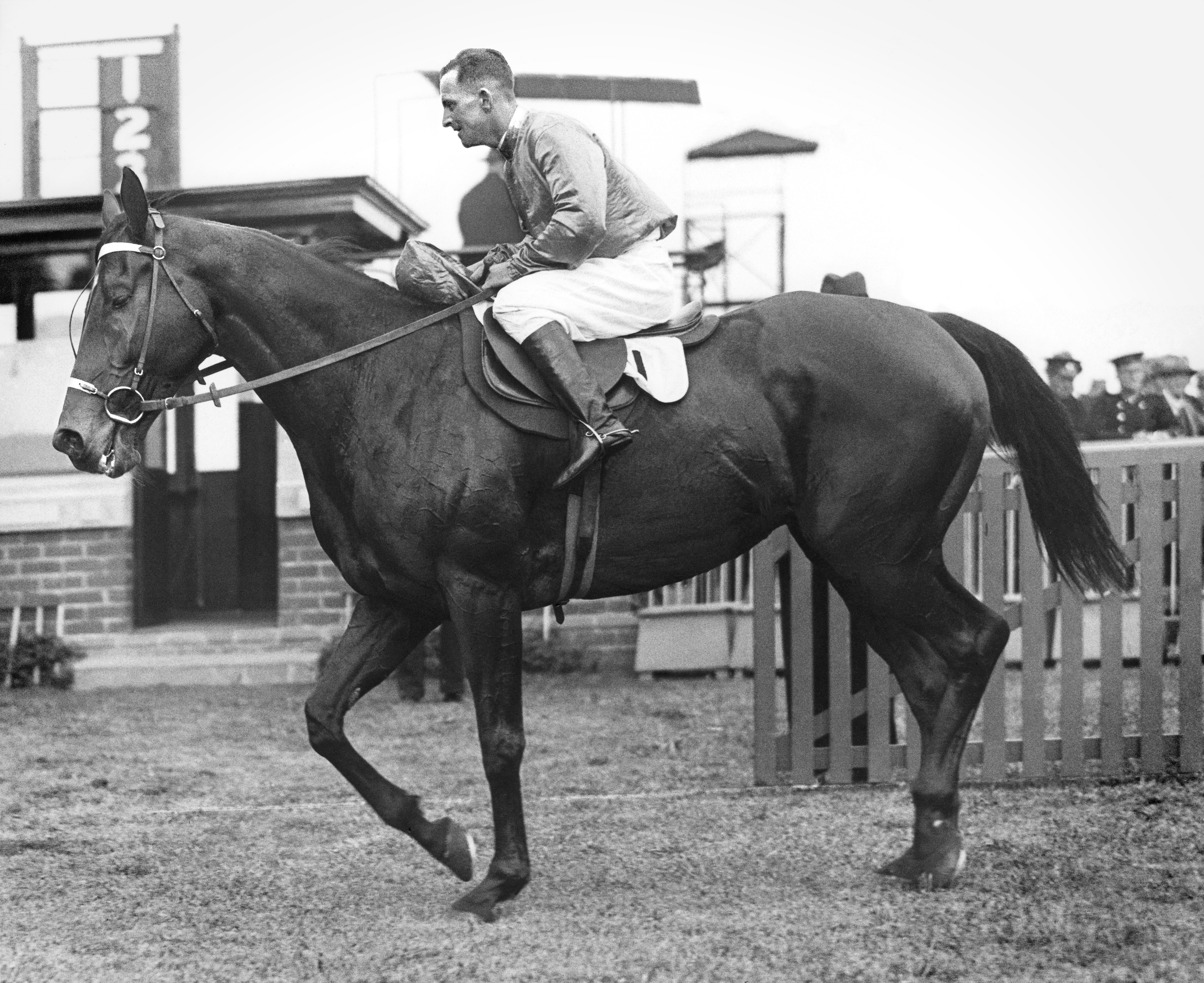
Amounis, 1928 winner

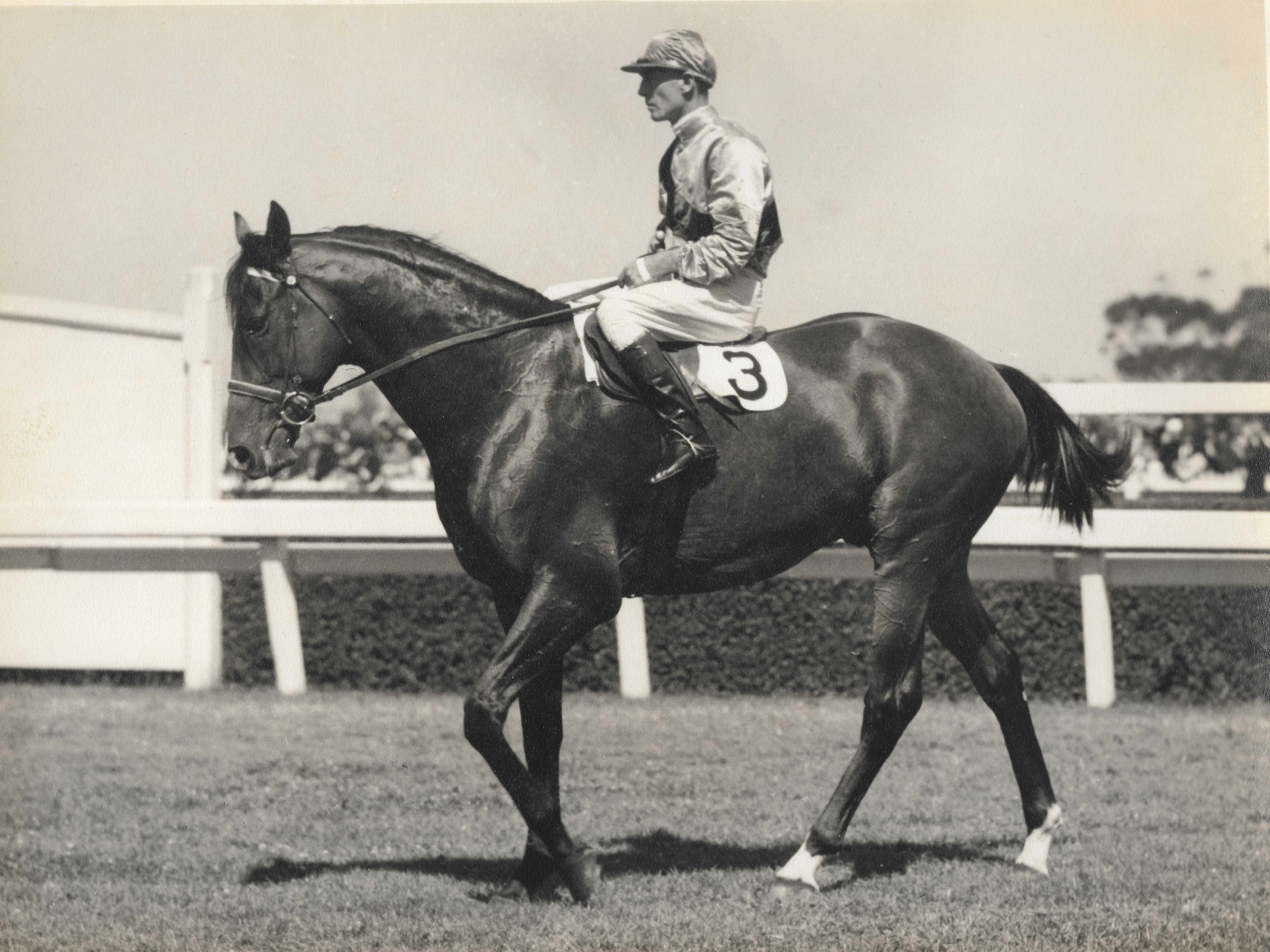
High Caste, 1940 winner

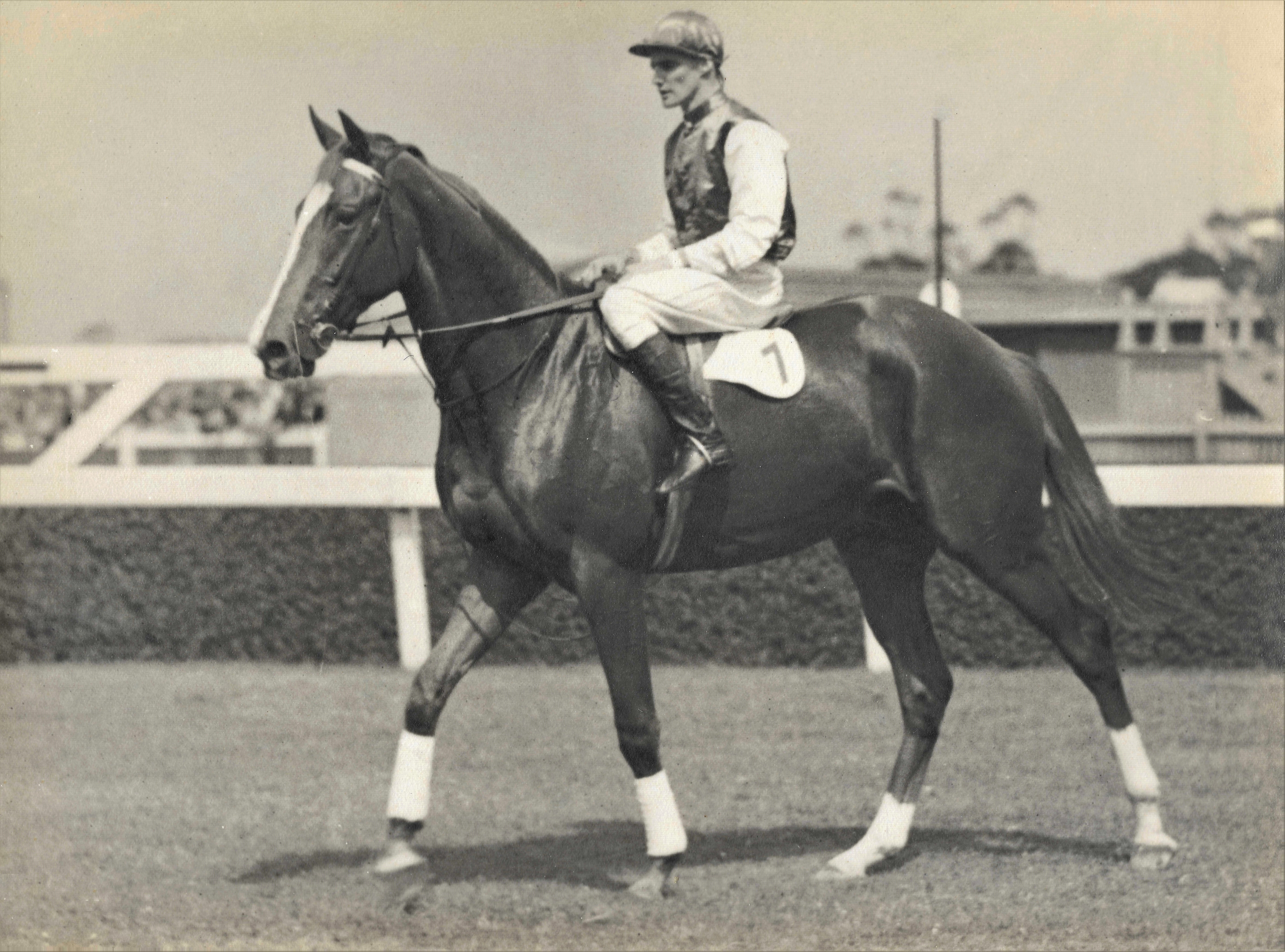
Gold Rod, 1937 winner

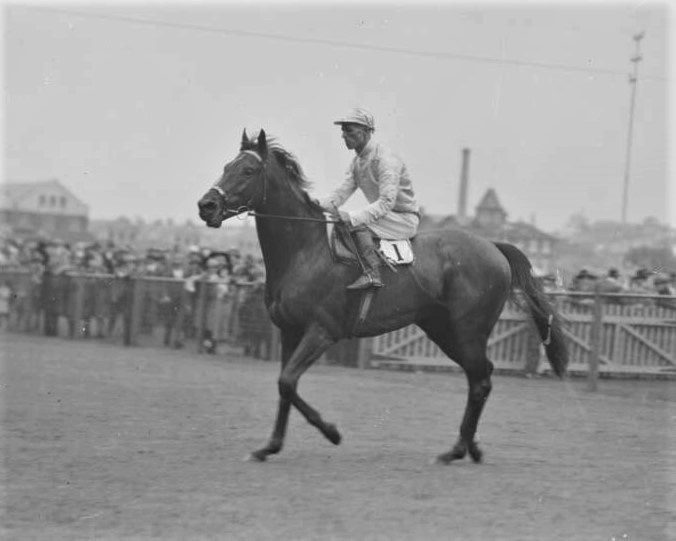
Chatham, 1932 & 1933 winner

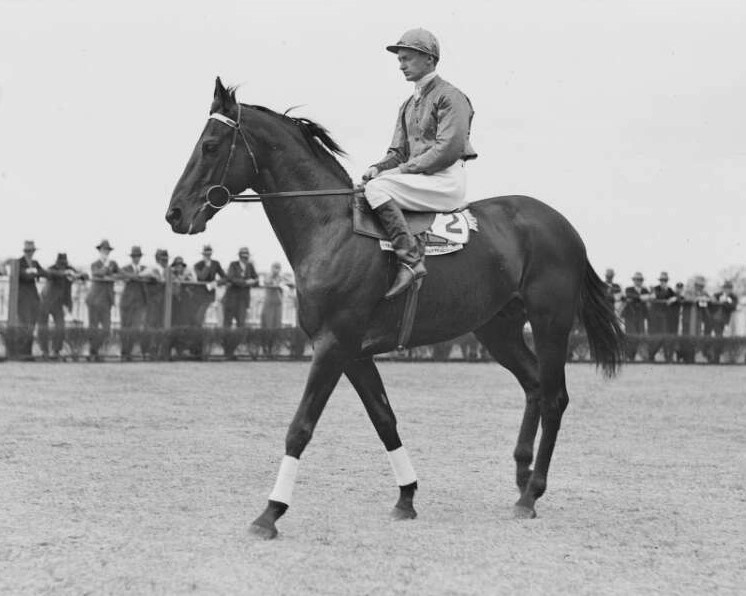
Nightmarch, 1929 winner

Kiaree, 1943 winner

The race was named after the famous Epsom Downs Racecourse in the South of England where the classic three-year-old Epsom Derby has been contested since 1780.

=== Grade ===
- 1865–1978 - Principal Race
- 1979 onwards - Group 1

=== Distance ===
- 1865–1878 - 1 mile (~1600 metres)
- 1879–1884 - 1 1/8 miles (~1800 metres)
- 1885–1971 - 1 mile (~1600 metres)
- 1972–2000 – 1600 metres
- 2001 – 1400 metres (run at Randwick's inner course known as the Kensington)
- 2002 onwards - 1600 metres

=== Venue ===
- 1865–1982 - Randwick Racecourse
- 1983 - Warwick Farm Racecourse
- 1984 onwards - Randwick Racecourse

=== 1934 and 1943 racebooks ===
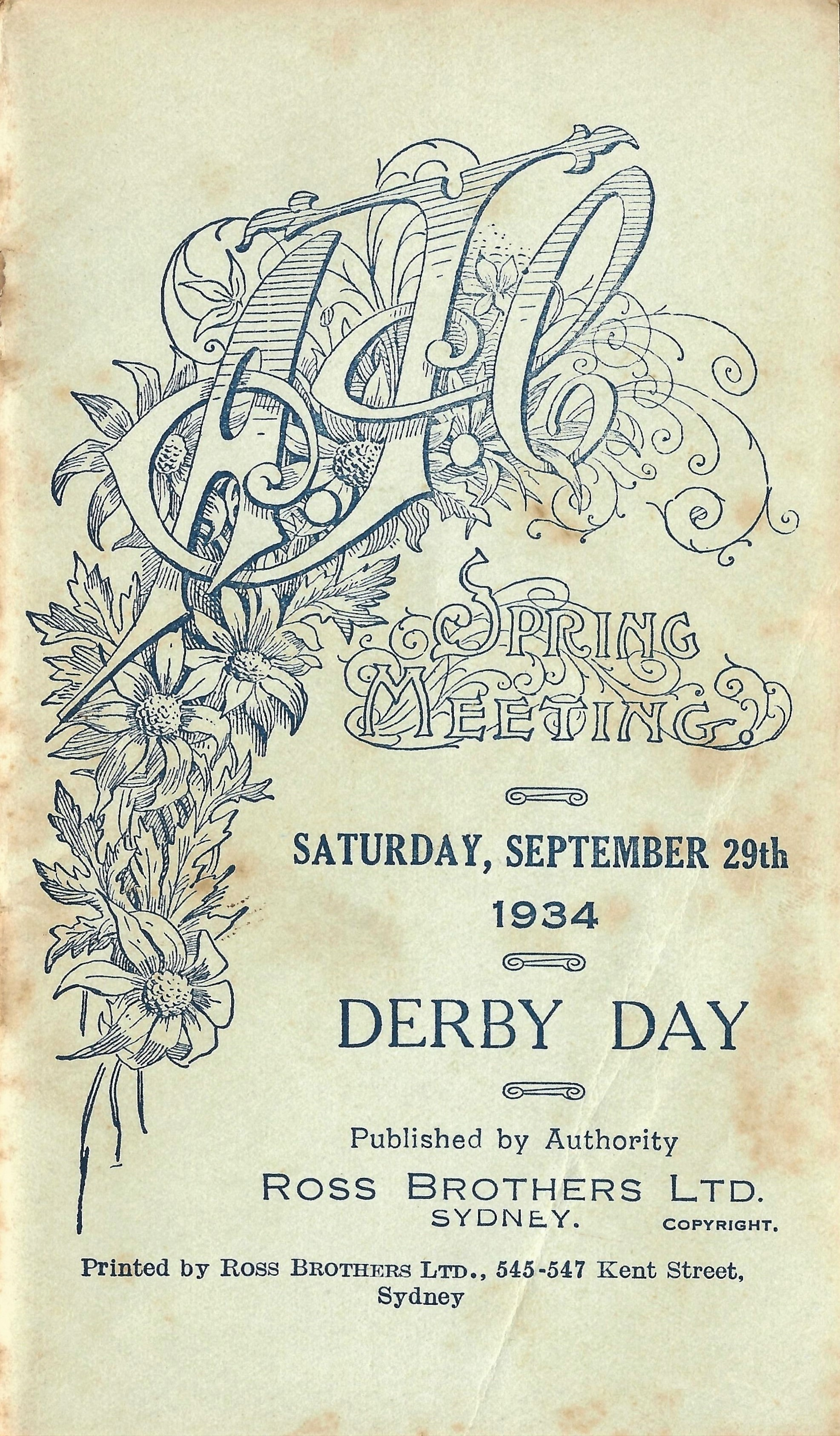
1934 AJC Epsom Handicap racebook front cover

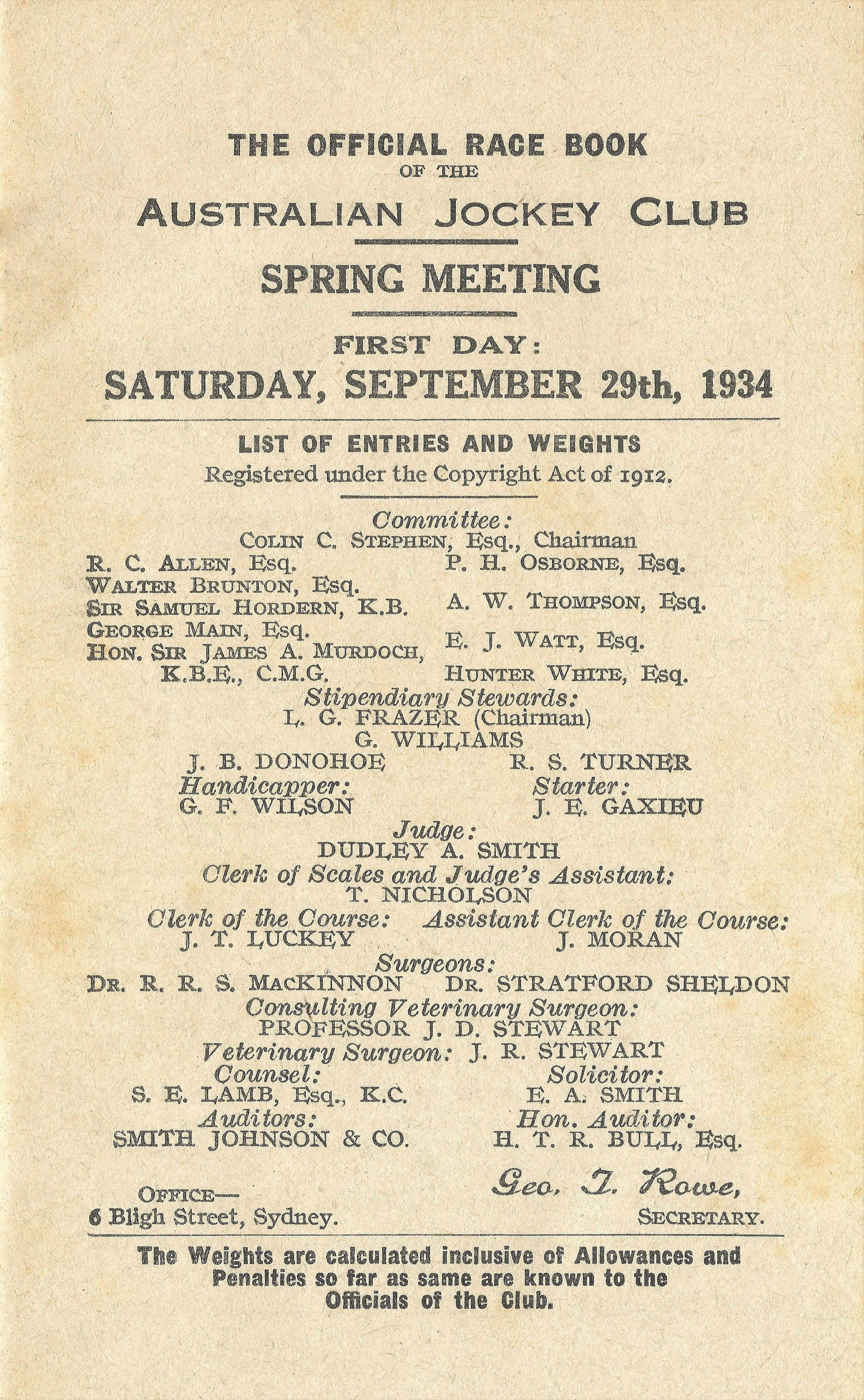
1934 AJC Epsom Handicap raceday officials

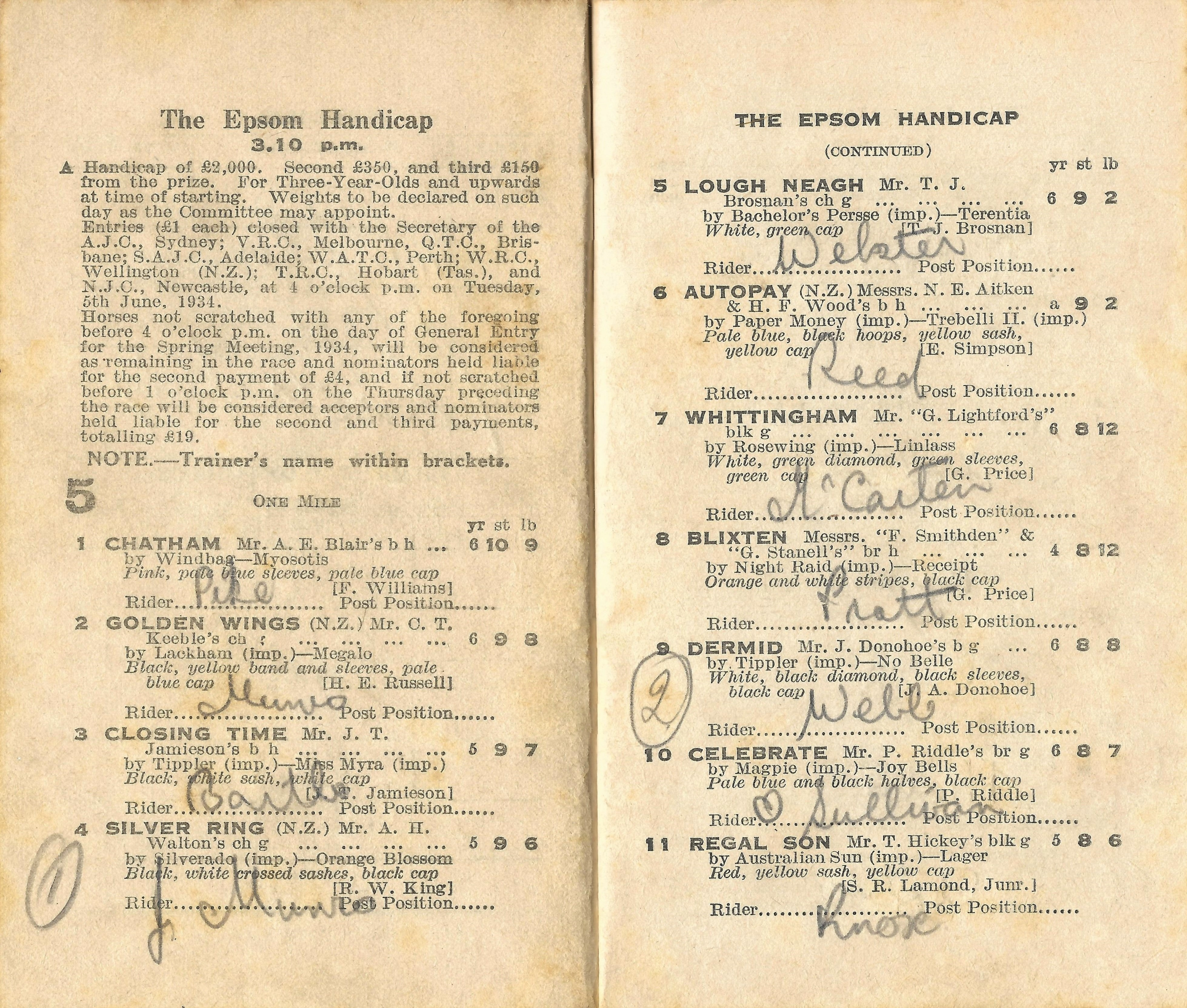
1934 AJC Epsom Handicap showing the winner, Silver Ring

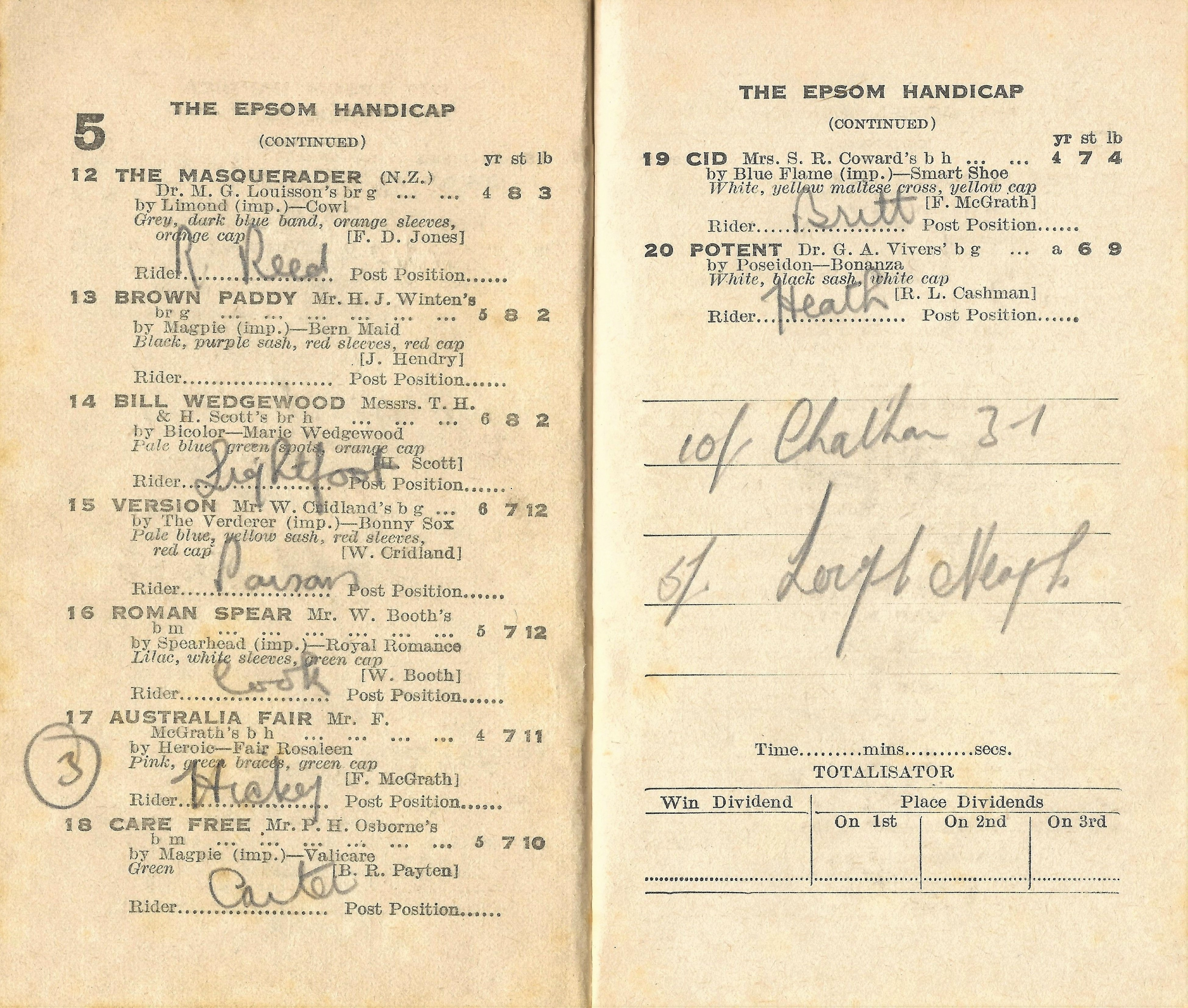
1934 AJC Epsom Handicap starters and results

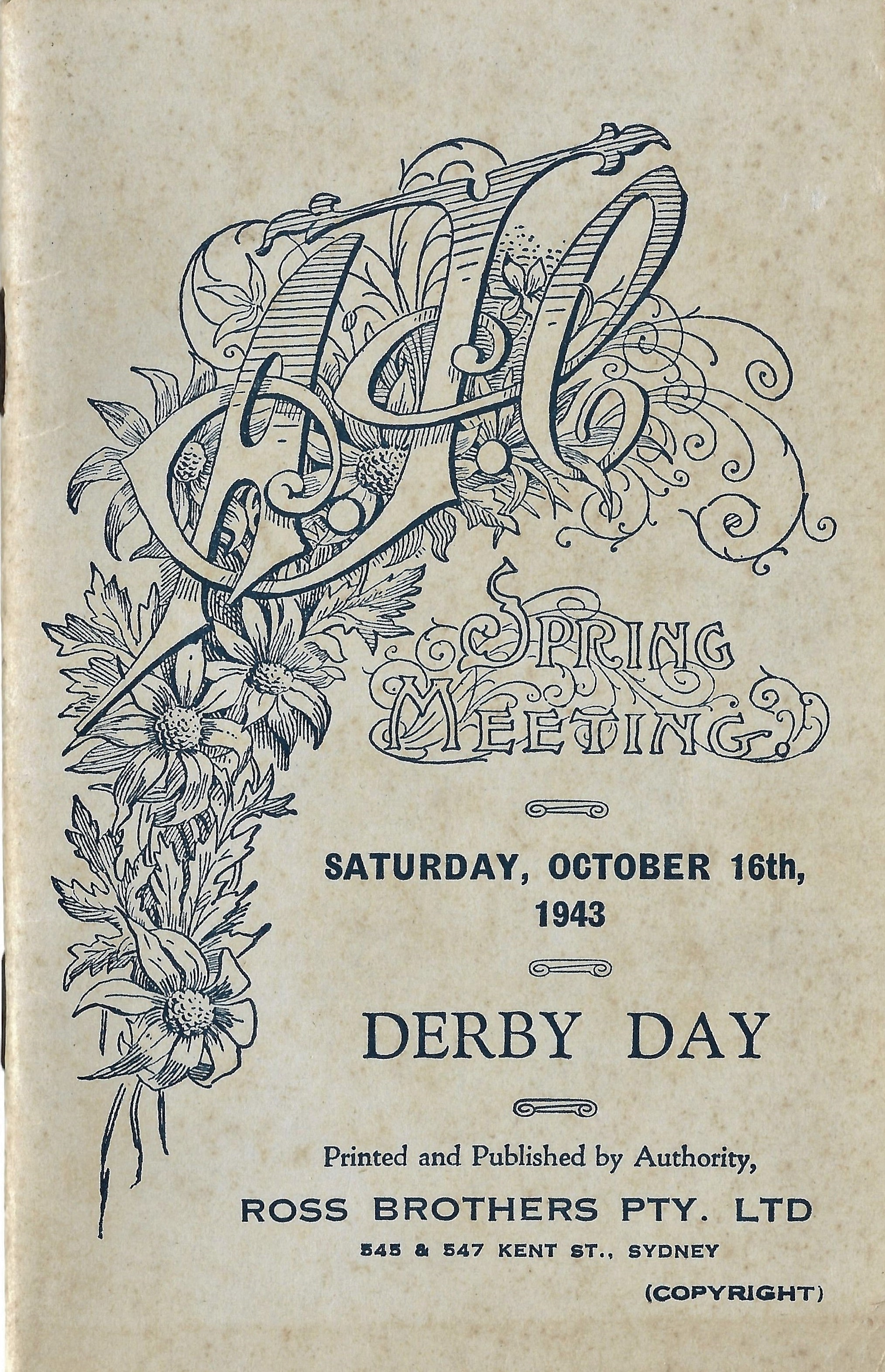
1943 AJC Epsom Handicap racebook front cover

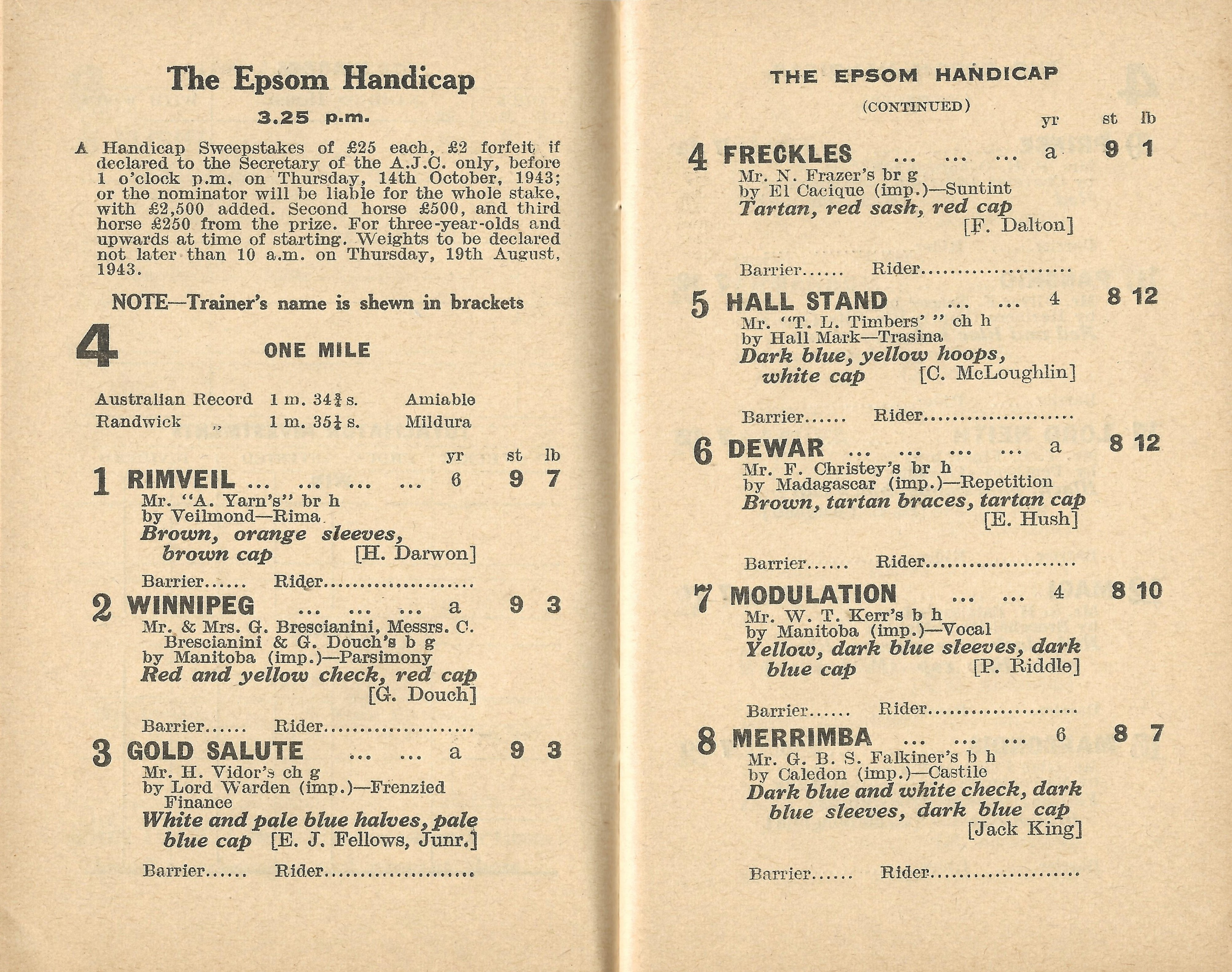
1943 AJC Epsom Handicap starters and results

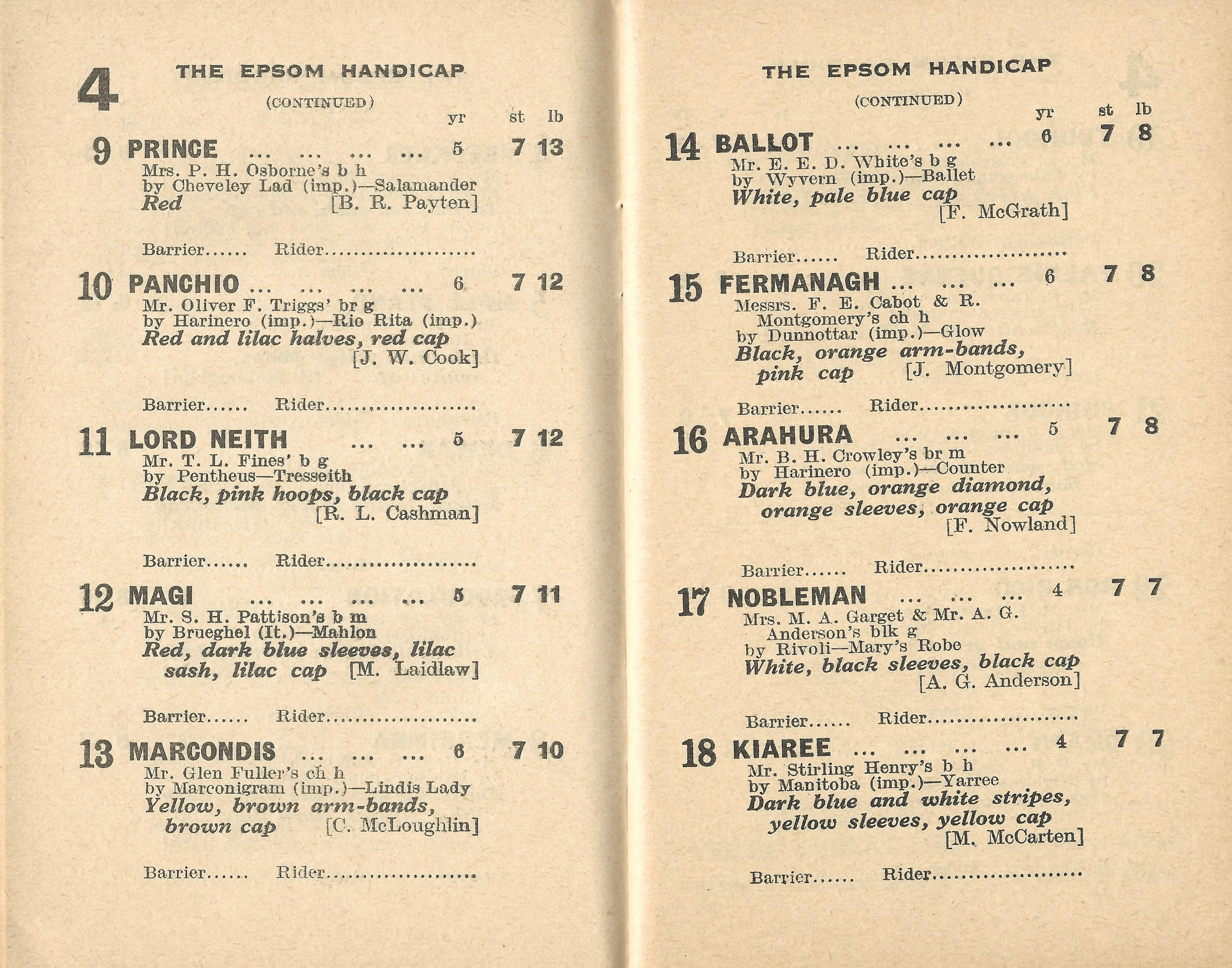
1943 AJC Epsom Handicap showing the winner, Kiaree

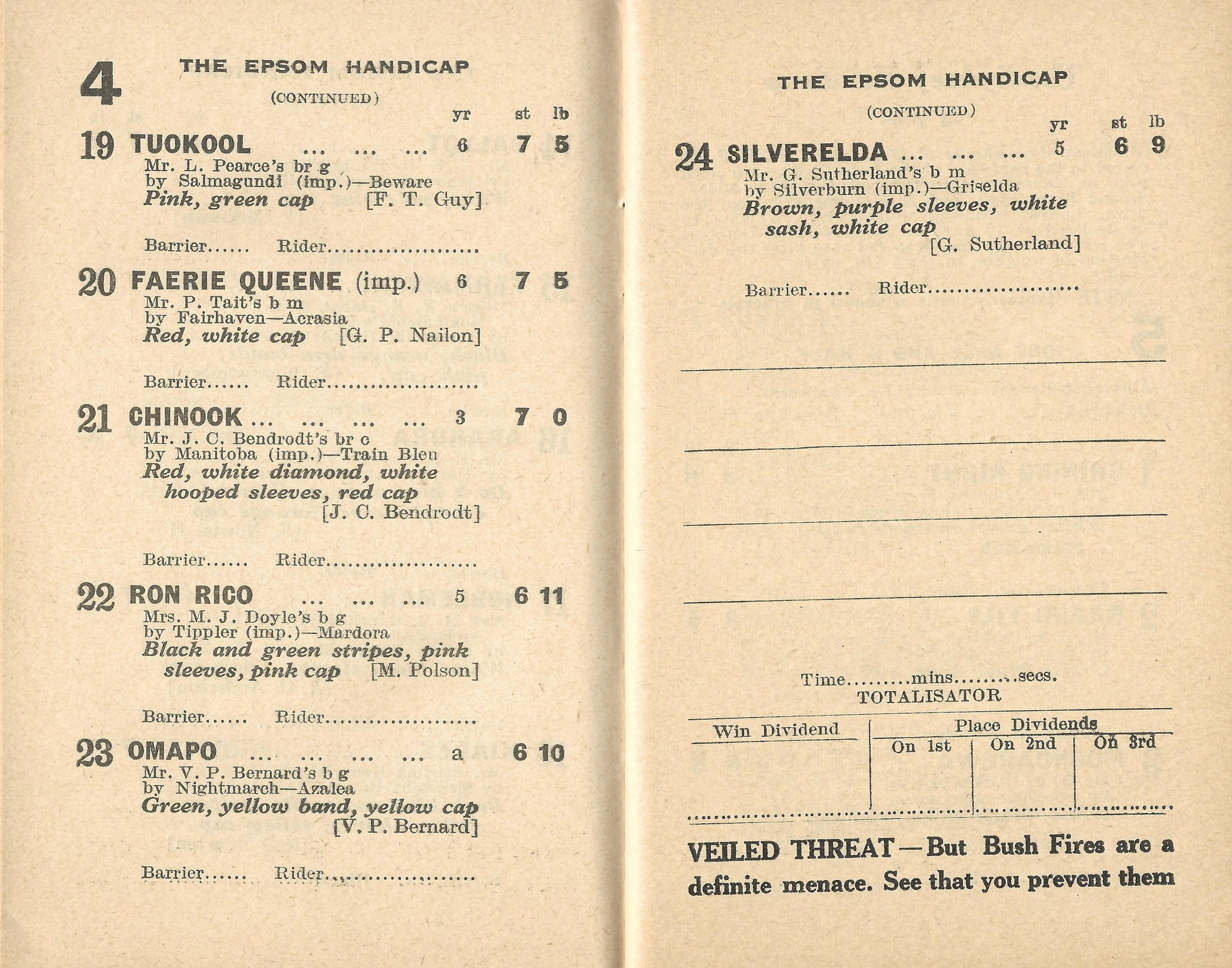
1943 AJC Epsom Handicap starters and results

=== 1945 and 1954 racebooks ===
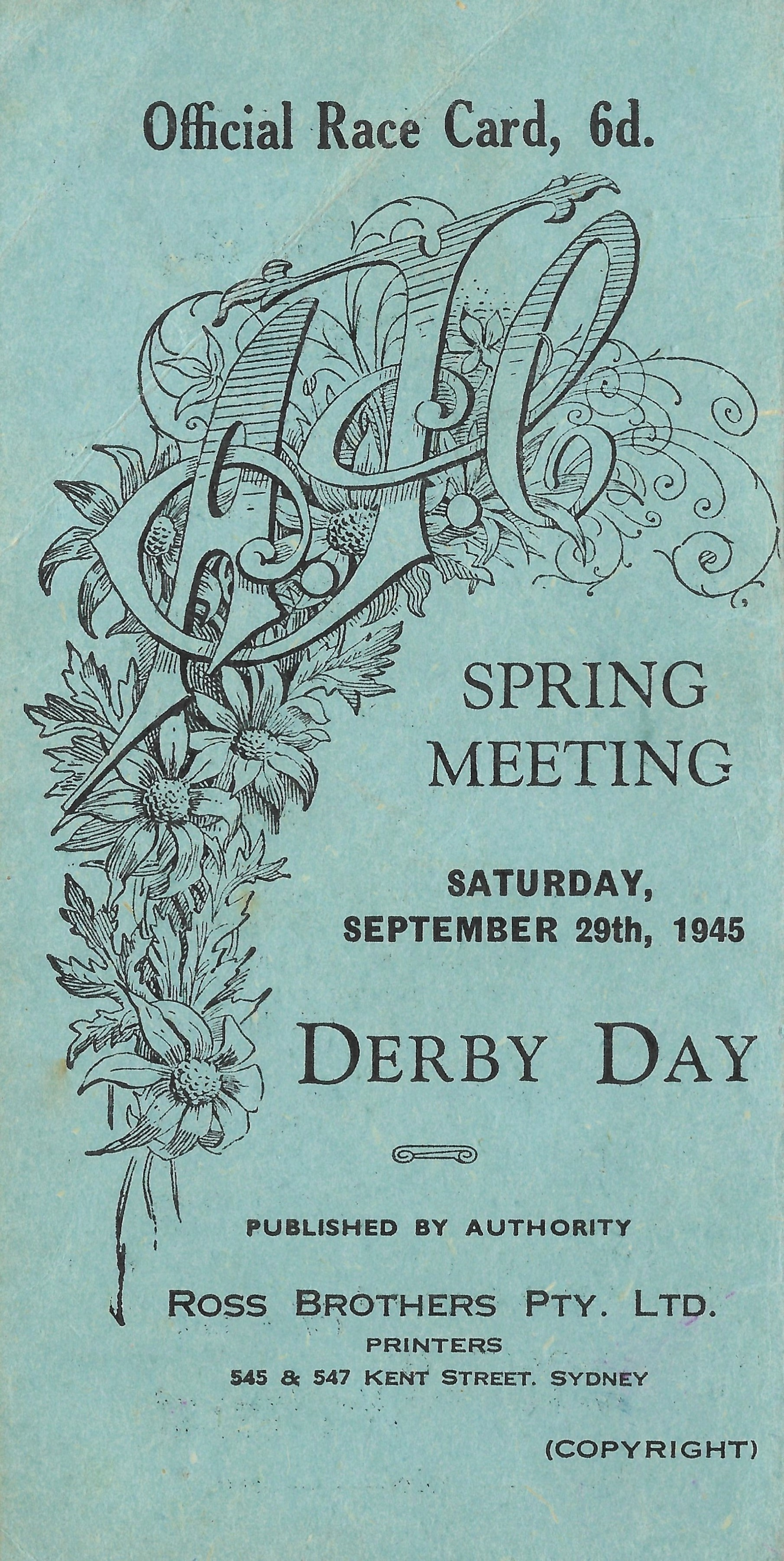
1945 AJC Epsom Handicap racebook front cover

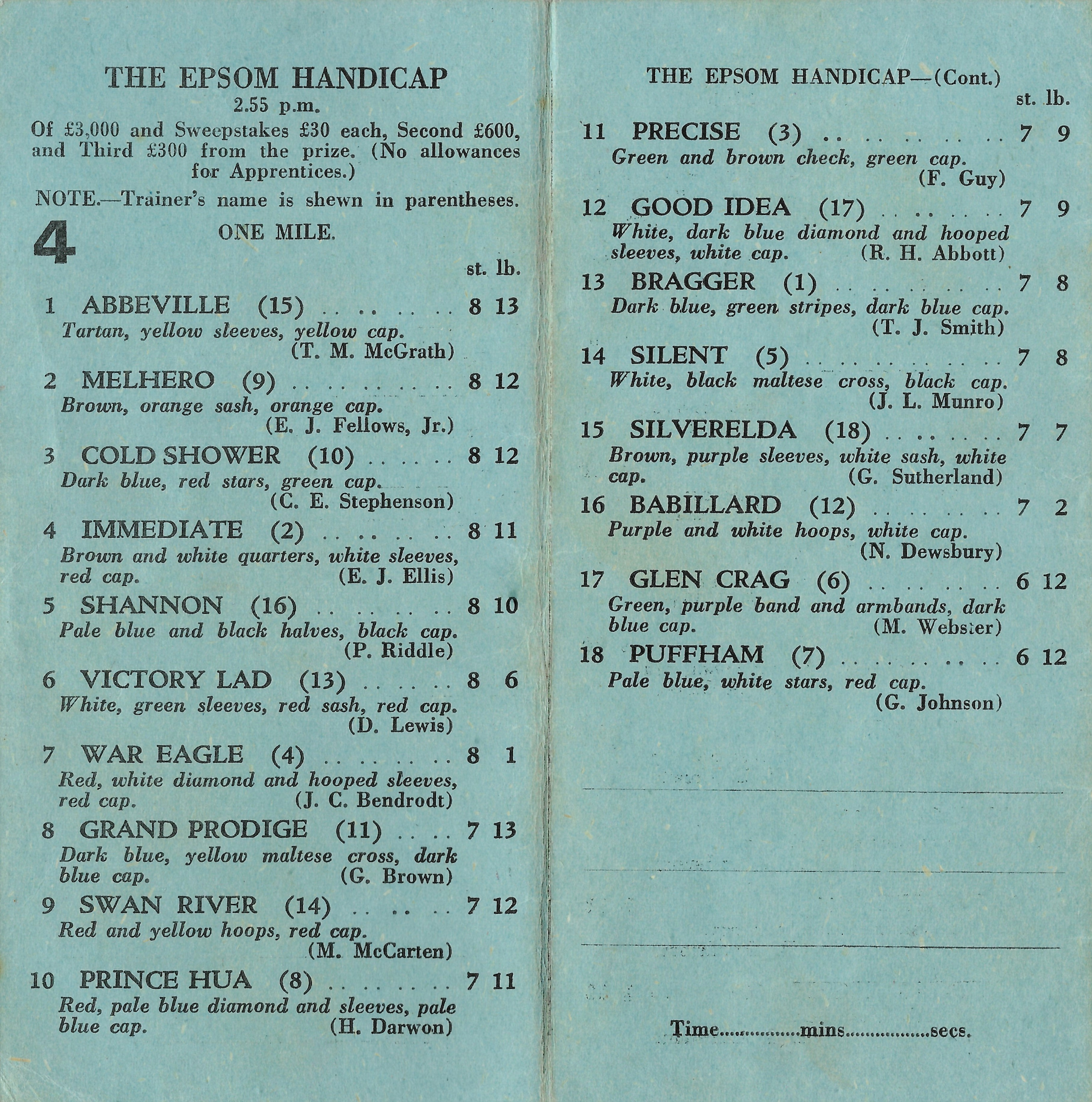
1945 AJC Epsom Handicap showing the winner, Shannon

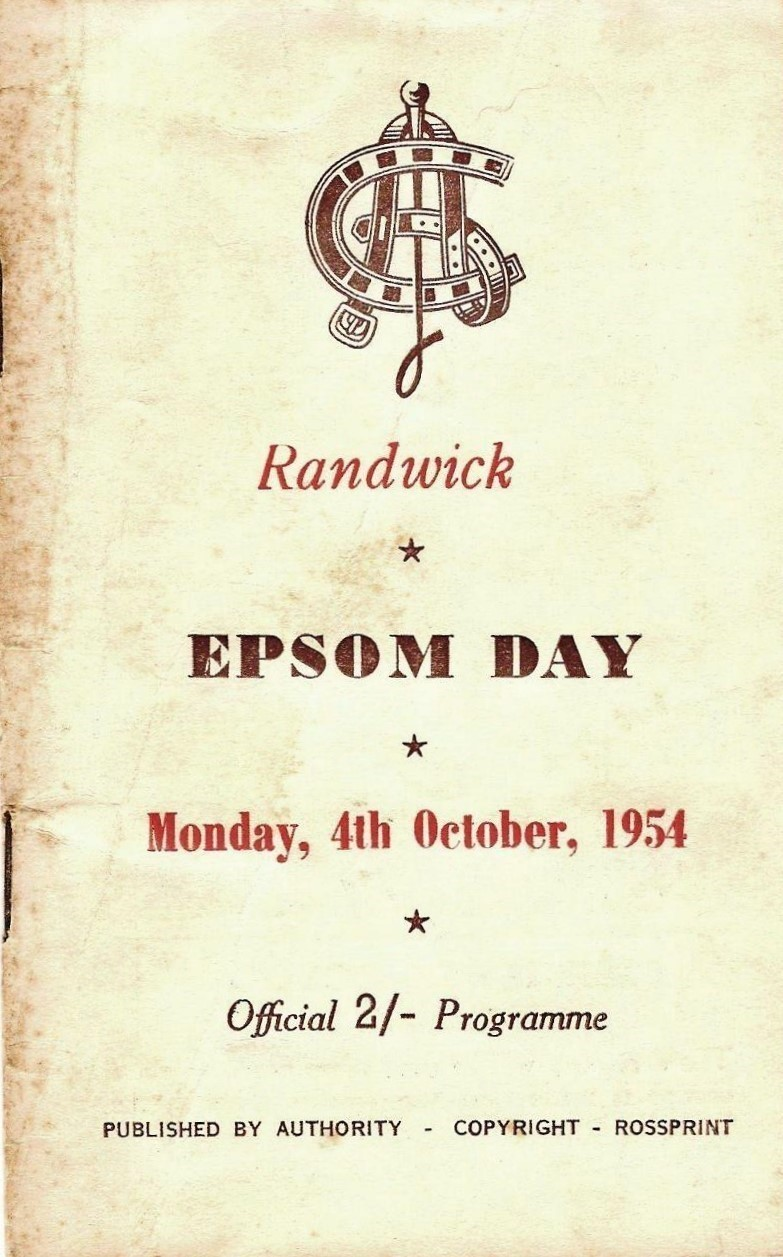
1954 AJC Epsom Handicap racebook front cover

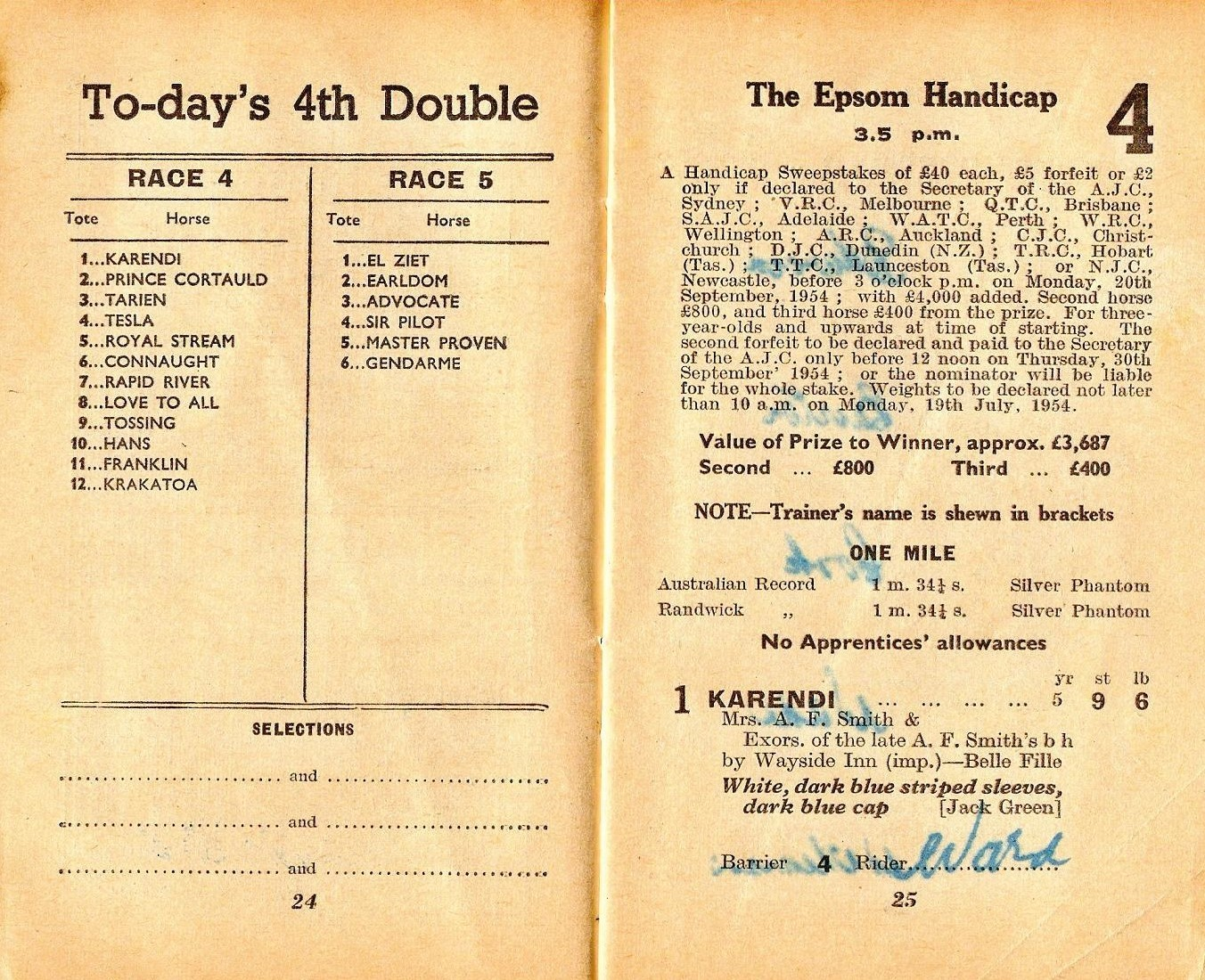
1954 AJC Epsom Handicap starters and results

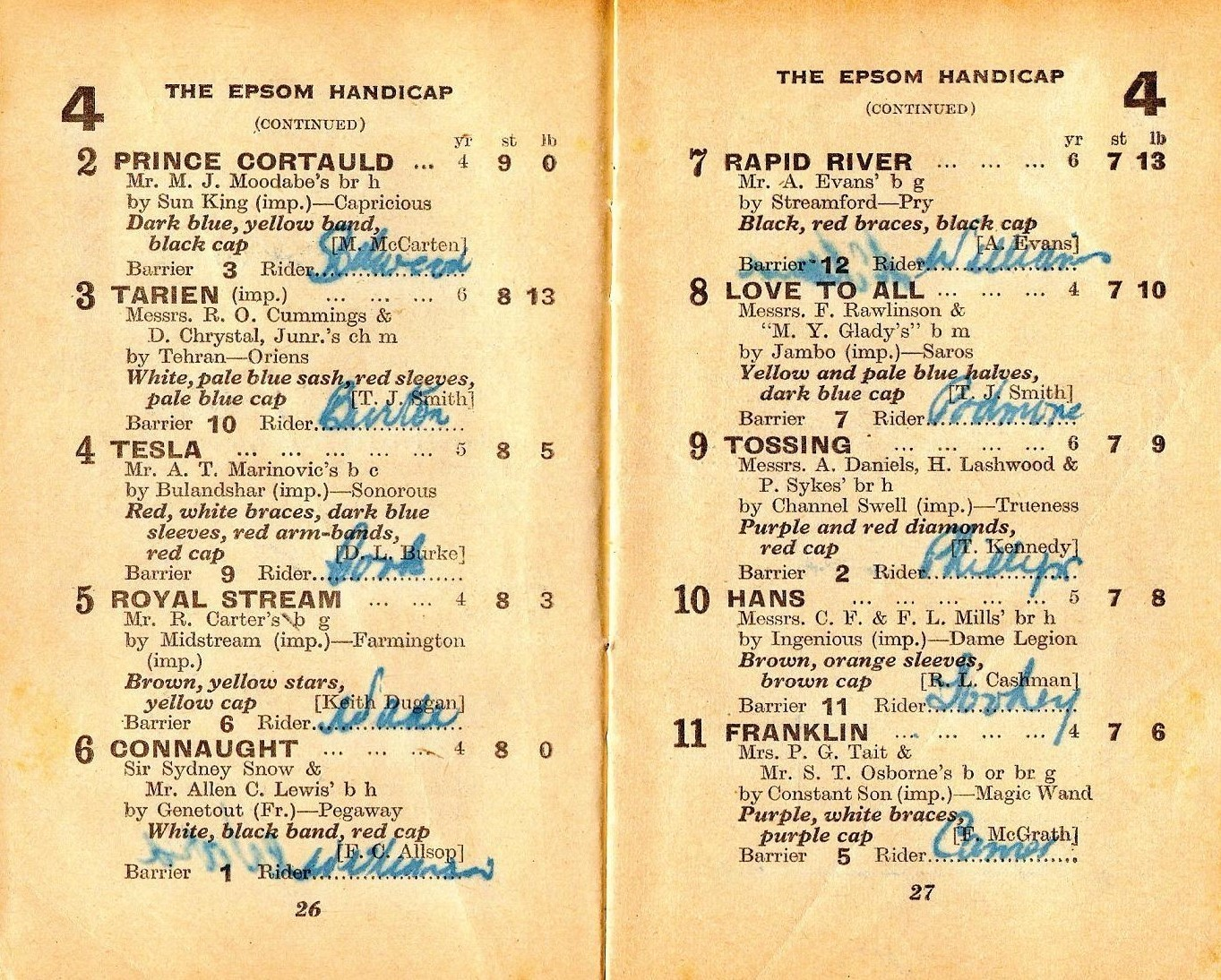
1954 AJC Epsom Handicap showing the winner, Connaught

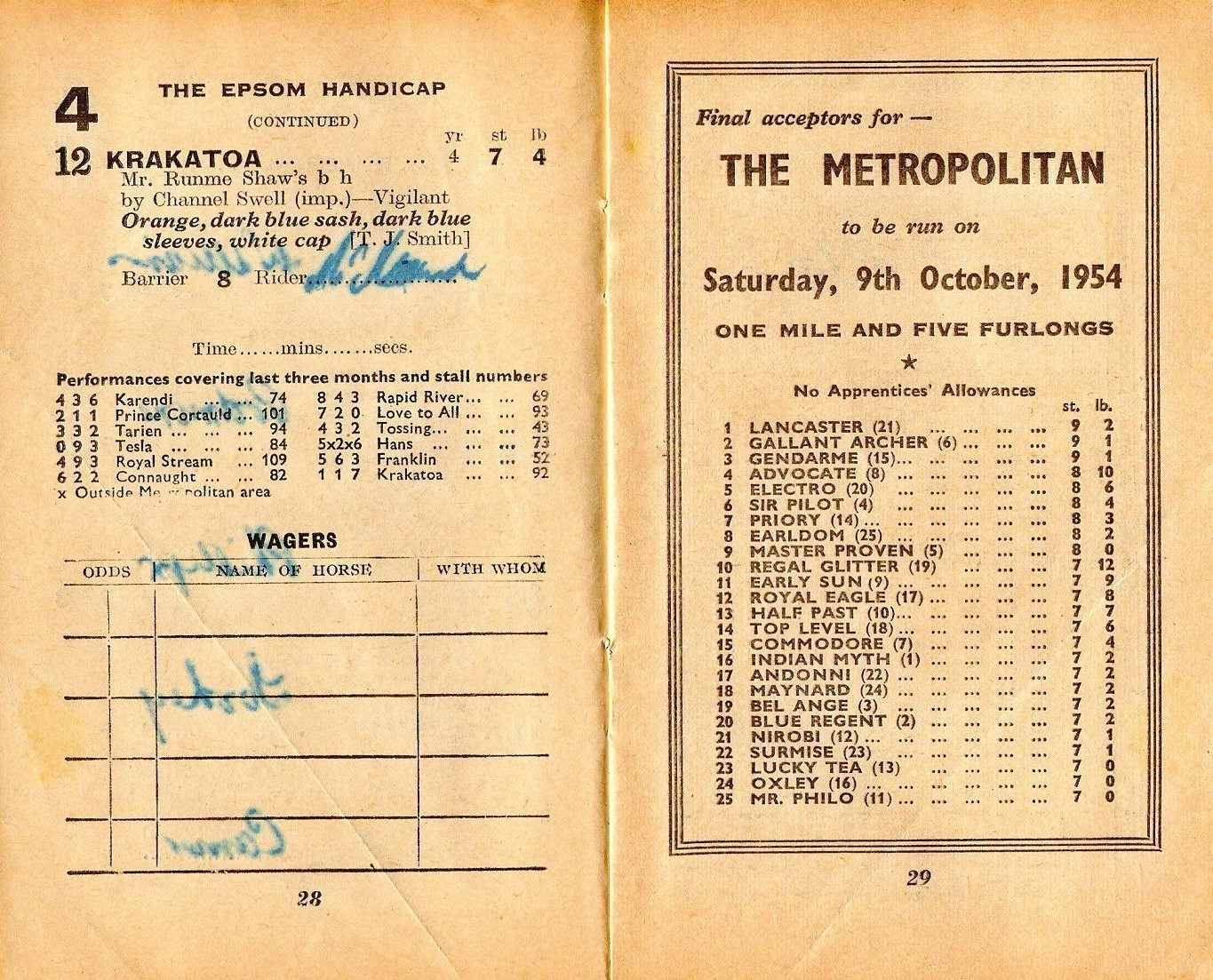
1954 AJC Epsom Handicap starters and results

== Winners ==
The following are past winners of the race.

- 2026 - God's Window
- 2025 - Autumn Glow
- 2024 - Ceolwulf
- 2023 - Rediener
- 2022 - † Ellsberg / Top Ranked
- 2021 - Private Eye
- 2020 - Probabeel
- 2019 - Kolding
- 2018 - Hartnell
- 2017 - Happy Clapper
- 2016 - Hauraki
- 2015 - Winx
- 2014 - He's Your Man
- 2013 - Boban
- 2012 - Fat Al
- 2011 - Secret Admirer
- 2010 - Captain Sonador
- 2009 - Rock Kingdom
- 2008 - Theseo
- 2007 - ‡race not held
- 2006 - Racing To Win
- 2005 - Desert War
- 2004 - Desert War
- 2003 - Clangalang
- 2002 - Excellerator
- 2001 - Final Fantasy
- 2000 - Shogun Lodge
- 1999 - Allez Suez
- 1998 - Dodge
- 1997 - Iron Horse
- 1996 - Filante
- 1995 - Nick's Joy
- 1994 - Navy Seal
- 1993 - Golden Sword
- 1992 - Kinjite
- 1991 - Super Impose
- 1990 - Super Impose
- 1989 - From The Planet
- 1988 - Regal Native
- 1987 - Sound Horizon
- 1986 - Chanteclair
- 1985 - Magnitude
- 1984 - Riverdale
- 1983 - Cool River
- 1982 - Dalmacia
- 1981 - Gold Circle
- 1980 - Bold Diplomat
- 1979 - Imposing
- 1978 - Leonotis
- 1977 - Raffindale
- 1976 - La Neige
- 1975 - Authentic Heir
- 1974 - Citadel
- 1973 - Lord Nelson
- 1972 - Triton
- 1971 - Gunsynd
- 1970 - Ricochet
- 1969 - Broker's Tip
- 1968 - Speed Of Sound
- 1967 - Cabochon
- 1966 - Chantal
- 1965 - Even Better
- 1964 - Toi Port
- 1963 - Toi Port
- 1962 - Rochdale
- 1961 - Sky High
- 1960 - Ma Cherie
- 1959 - Noholme
- 1958 - Turkestan
- 1957 - Timor
- 1956 - Knave
- 1955 - Hans
- 1954 - Connaught
- 1953 - Silver Phantom
- 1952 - High Law
- 1951 - Davey Jones
- 1950 - Achilles
- 1949 - Denali
- 1948 - De La Salle
- 1947 - Titanic
- 1946 - Blue Legend
- 1945 - Shannon
- 1944 - Modulation
- 1943 - Kiaree
- 1942 - Freckles
- 1941 - Rimveil
- 1940 - High Caste
- 1939 - Geebung
- 1938 - King's Head
- 1937 - Gold Rod
- 1936 - Capris
- 1935 - Synagogue
- 1934 - Silver Ring
- 1933 - Chatham
- 1932 - Chatham
- 1931 - Autopay
- 1930 - Cathmar
- 1929 - Nightmarch
- 1928 - Amounis
- 1927 - Vaals
- 1926 - Amounis
- 1925 - †Boaster / Metellus
- 1924 - Blackadder
- 1923 - Claro
- 1922 - Rostrum
- 1921 - Beauford
- 1920 - Greenstead
- 1919 - Wolaroi
- 1918 - Rebus
- 1917 - Satin Bird
- 1916 - Panacre
- 1915 - Woorak
- 1914 - Portrush
- 1913 - Aleconner
- 1912 - Hartfell
- 1911 - Volsloane
- 1910 - Silver Hampton
- 1909 - Hyman
- 1908 - Melodrama
- 1907 - Melodrama
- 1906 - Maximize
- 1905 - Sleeper
- 1904 - Contest
- 1903 - Famous
- 1902 - Air Motor
- 1901 - Sequence
- 1900 - Ampier
- 1899 - Djin Djin
- 1898 - Alemene
- 1897 - Robin Hood
- 1896 - Steward
- 1895 - Hopscotch
- 1894 - Uabba
- 1893 - Brockleigh
- 1892 - Daredevil
- 1891 - Marvel
- 1890 - Bungebah
- 1889 - Novice
- 1888 - Stockwell
- 1887 - Phaon
- 1886 - Zeno
- 1885 - Folly
- 1884 - Espiegle
- 1883 - Masquerade
- 1882 - Masquerade
- 1881 - Waxy
- 1880 - Master Avenel
- 1879 - Sweetmeat
- 1878 - Viscount
- 1877 - Eva
- 1876 - Malta
- 1875 - Evangeline
- 1874 - Westminster
- 1873 - †Atalanta / Kingfisher
- 1872 - The Count
- 1871 - Captain Cook
- 1870 - Deceptive
- 1869 - Circassian
- 1868 - Phoebe
- 1867 - Birmingham
- 1866 - Rapidan
- 1865 - Dundee

† Dead heat
‡ Not held because of outbreak of equine influenza

== See also ==
- List of Australian Group races
- Group races
