= Black Heart Bart =

Australian thoroughbred racehorse

- Sire: Blackfriars
- Grandsire: Danehill
- Dam: Sister Theresa
- Damsire: At Talaq
- Sex: Gelding
- Foaled: 11 September 2010
- Country: Australia
- Colour: Bay
- Breeder: Durham Lodge Thoroughbred Stud
- Owner: K Renner, C Delacy, D Richardson, A Psaltis, Mccarth
- Trainer: Vaughn Sigley (2013-2015); Darren Weir (2015-2018); Lindsey Smith (2019-2020)
- Record: 62: 17–15–4
- Earnings: A$ 4,818,580

Major wins
- Northerly Stakes (2015); Lee Steere Stakes (2015); Victoria Handicap (2016); The Goodwood (2016); Memsie Stakes (2016); Underwood Stakes (2016, 2019); C F Orr Stakes (2017); Futurity Stakes (2017)

Black Heart Bart (foaled 11 September 2010) is a retired six-time Group 1 winning Australian bred thoroughbred racehorse.

== Background ==
Black Heart Bart was purchased by senior part owner Kim Renner for $20,000 at the 2012 Magic Millions Perth Yearling Sale.

== Racing career ==
=== 2013/14: three-year-old season ===
Unraced as a two-year-old, Black Heart Bart made his race debut on the 7 December 2013, finishing unplaced at Western Australia's Ascot Racecourse. Black Heart Bart would have a further seven starts as a three-year-old without success.

=== 2014/15: four-year-old season ===
Black Heart Bart won his first race on the 19 October 2014 in a maiden race at Bunbury Racecourse. As a four-year-old he raced twelve times, winning seven, including four at Listed level.

=== 2015/16: five-year-old season ===
Black Heart Bart won his first three races as a five year old, which included victories in the Northerly Stakes and Lee Steere Stakes. Trainer Vaughn Sigley announced that in the new year the horse would be transferred to a larger stable in Victoria where the horse could contest better races. Sigley said, “The plan is to send him over east, you will find he will be going to Darren Weir who is on fire with his horses over there.”

At his first run for new trainer Darren Weir, Black Heart Bart was narrowly beaten into second place in the Newmarket Handicap at Flemington Racecourse and the All Aged Stakes at Randwick Racecourse, before winning his first Group 1 race in The Goodwood. Black Heart Bart settled midfield early during the race from his inside barrier and then came with a strong sprint in the straight under jockey Brad Rawiller to score impressively. “All of his runs for me have been terrific,” Weir said after the win. “His form before he came over to us was terrific and it’s great to see a horse like him win a Group One. He’s a good class horse and he gallops at home like you’d expect him to.”

=== 2016/17: six-year-old season ===
Black Heart Bart won his second Group 1 race when winning the 2016 Memsie Stakes.

Two starts later he won his third Group 1 when a dominant 2.5 length winner in the Underwood Stakes. Two weeks after this victory it set up his first race against champion horse Winx who was on an 11 race winning streak. Lining up in a small field of three runners in the Caulfield Stakes, Black Heart Bart led the field but was eventually beaten 2 lengths by Winx.

In February 2017, Black Heart Bart won back-to-back Group 1 races in the C F Orr Stakes and the Futurity Stakes.

=== 2017/18: seven-year-old season ===
Black Heart Bart only raced on seven occasions in his seven-year-old season but still managed to place in three Group 1 races, the 2017 Memsie Stakes, Makybe Diva Stakes and Railway Stakes.

=== 2018/19: eight-year-old season ===
Black Heart Bart contested five races as an eight-year-old with all his runs being unplaced. After the 2018 Toorak Handicap where he finished 16th at the odds of 30/1, it was announced that the horse would be retired due to injury.

=== 2019/20: nine-year-old season ===
After a lay-off of almost twelve months, it was announced that Black Heart Bart would return to racing under new trainer Lindsey Smith. The news of the horse's return, having been retired after a series of poor performances and injuries caused much criticism in the media. Responding to this negative media, new trainer Lindsey Smith released a statement saying, "I'm a horse trainer and I've been doing it for a long time. I love animals and I won't send him to a race track if I don't think he'll be competitive."

On the 31 August 2019, Black Heart Bart returned to racing in the Memsie Stakes. Starting at the odds of 60/1 he was beaten 4 lengths into 8th placing. Three weeks later he contested the Sir Rupert Clarke Stakes and finished in 11th position beaten 6.75 lengths by Begood Toya Mother.

A week later, Black Heart Bart started in the Underwood Stakes at Caulfield Racecourse, a race he had won three years prior in 2016. Starting at the odds of 100/1 he managed to hold off his competitors and won the race by a short neck margin, winning his sixth Group 1 race in the process.

Two weeks later, Black Heart Bart was narrowly beaten into second place in the Caulfield Stakes. This would be the last time the horse would place in a race, having another five runs before bleeding from both nostrils in the Hyperion Stakes where he finished last. The horse was retired from racing immediately and trainer Lindsey Smith reported the following day he had recovered well since the race and would enjoy his retirement. It was announced Black Heart Bart would be retired to live out his life on a cattle farm in Albany, Western Australia.

== Pedigree ==
Pedigree of Black Heart Bart (AUS) 2010
Sire Blackfriars (AUS) 1996	Danehill (USA); 1986	Danzig	Northern Dancer
Sire Blackfriars (AUS) 1996	Danehill (USA); 1986	Danzig	Pas de Nom
Sire Blackfriars (AUS) 1996	Danehill (USA); 1986	Razyana	His Majesty
Sire Blackfriars (AUS) 1996	Danehill (USA); 1986	Razyana	Spring Adieu
Sire Blackfriars (AUS) 1996	Kensington Gardens (AUS); 1986	Grosvenor	Sir Tristram
Sire Blackfriars (AUS) 1996	Kensington Gardens (AUS); 1986	Grosvenor	My Tricia
Sire Blackfriars (AUS) 1996	Kensington Gardens (AUS); 1986	Tilly Foster	Vice Regal
Sire Blackfriars (AUS) 1996	Kensington Gardens (AUS); 1986	Tilly Foster	Gentle Thoughts
Dam Sister Theresa (AUS) 1994	At Talaq (USA); 1981	Roberto	Hail To Reason
Dam Sister Theresa (AUS) 1994	At Talaq (USA); 1981	Roberto	Bramalea
Dam Sister Theresa (AUS) 1994	At Talaq (USA); 1981	My Nord	Vent du Nord
Dam Sister Theresa (AUS) 1994	At Talaq (USA); 1981	My Nord	My Alison
Dam Sister Theresa (AUS) 1994	Alma Mater (AUS); 1998	Semipalatinsk	Nodouble
Dam Sister Theresa (AUS) 1994	Alma Mater (AUS); 1998	Semipalatinsk	School Board
Dam Sister Theresa (AUS) 1994	Alma Mater (AUS); 1998	Sweetie	Without Fear
Dam Sister Theresa (AUS) 1994	Alma Mater (AUS); 1998	Sweetie	Virginia
