= Northerly =

Australian-bred Thoroughbred racehorse

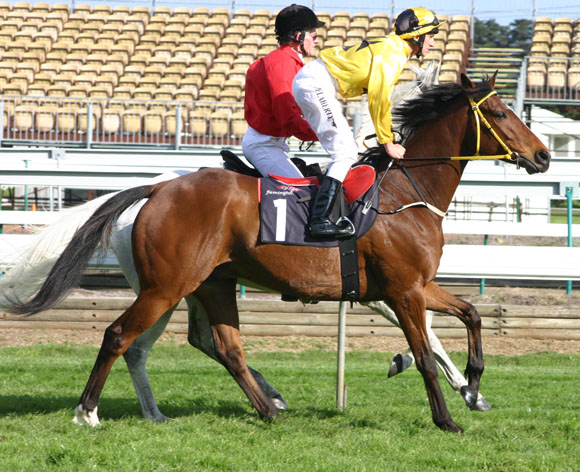
- With jockey Mark Flaherty, 2004 Turnbull Stakes
- Sire: Serheed (USA)
- Grandsire: Nijinsky II
- Dam: North Bell
- Damsire: Bellewater (FR)
- Sex: Gelding
- Foaled: 17 October 1996
- Died: 9 May 2012 (aged 15)
- Country: Australia
- Colour: Bay
- Breeder: Oakland Park Stud
- Owner: Mr & Mrs N.G. Duncan & Mrs J Kersley
- Trainer: Fred Kersley
- Record: 37: 19–7–2
- Earnings: A$9,341,850

Major wins
- Australian Cup (2001, 2003); W. S. Cox Plate (2001, 2002); Underwood Stakes (2001, 2002); Caulfield Cup (2002); Yalumba Stakes (2001); Railway Stakes (2000)

Awards
- Australian Middle Distance Champion (2002, 2003); Australian Champion Racehorse of the Year (2003); Timeform rating: 129

Honours
- Northerly Stakes; Australian Racing Hall of Fame
- Last updated on 5 March 2007

Northerly (17 October 1996 – 9 May 2012) was an Australian racehorse who is considered arguably Australia's best middle distance Thoroughbred horse of the early 2000s. Northerly, trained by Western Australian harness racing legend Fred Kersley, won nine Group One (G1) races, including the Australian Cup twice, and the Cox Plate, regarded as the Weight for Age championship of Australasia, also on two occasions.

The horse, a bay gelding, was bred by Oakland Park Stud in Western Australia and was sired by Serheed (USA) from North Bell by Bellewater (FR). Serheed, a half-brother to both Ajdal and Formidable, was the sire of 27 stakeswinners that had 84 stakeswins, mostly in Western Australia with Northerly being his best performer. North Bell was the dam of five named foals which included two other stakes winners, North Boy and Northern Song, both by Rory's Jester. Northerly was inbred to Northern Dancer in the third, fourth and fifth generation (3m x 4f x 5f).

== Racing career ==
Northerly had 37 race starts, for 19 wins, 7 seconds and 2 thirds, earning prize money of A$9.34 million. Northerly was a favourite of punters for his ability to win after appearing defeated, and this trait, in combination with his racing colours of yellow, black Maltese Cross and quartered cap earned him the nickname of "The Fighting Tiger".

=== Three- and four-year-old seasons: 1999–2001 ===
After winning a string of minor races in Perth, Northerly burst on the scene with his victory in the 2000 Railway Stakes in his native Perth where he accounted for the state's best milers by nearly three lengths.

Following a first-up second in 2001 in the unsuitably short Australia Day Stakes in Perth, Northerly arrived in Melbourne for an autumn campaign aimed at the Australian Cup. He won his first race in Melbourne, the Carlyon Cup over 1,600 metres, by almost four lengths, in course record time, and began a successful relationship with New Zealand jockey Greg Childs.

Following a third, carrying 59 kilograms (9 st 4 lbs), in the Victoria Gold Cup, Northerly headed to the Australian Cup over 2,000 metres at Flemington – his first weight-for-age race against top class opposition. Despite racing three-wide, he won by just over three lengths in course record time. Greg Childs said "On that run today, to break the track record after racing three-wide, you'd have to say he's already on the way up to Sunline's status. He's not quite Sunline yet, but he's got all the hallmarks of a champion." Sunline, a champion New Zealand mare, had won the Cox Plate for two years running, and the spring clash with Northerly was now widely anticipated.

=== Five-year-old season: 2001–2002 ===
Northerly was spelled for the winter, and started his campaign in Perth, where he won first-up and was defeated second-up with 62 kilograms. He then travelled to Melbourne, where he met Sunline for the first time in the John F Feehan Stakes in mid-September. This time, Damien Oliver took the ride, as Greg Childs was committed to Sunline. The great mare raced clear approaching the home turn, but Northerly rallied in the straight for the narrow, fighting victory that would become his trademark. Greg Childs said "Sunline was at peak fitness. We took off early and he looked a beaten horse. But he nailed us on the line. It was his determination. Often he looked to be struggling but he kept coming".

Not meeting again before the Cox Plate, Northerly added Group One wins in the Underwood and Caulfield Stakes, while Sunline edged to favouritism for the Cox Plate with her victory in the Turnbull Stakes.

The stage was now set for the 2001 Cox Plate. In typical style, Sunline led the field to the home turn, but – unlike the previous two years, when she raced clear in the straight – the Sydney three-year-old Viscount refused to give in, while Northerly loomed wider on the track. Nearing the line, the three horses buffeted one another on several occasions, and, while Northerly narrowly edged past Sunline and Viscount, the roughhouse conclusion to the race sparked three separate protests – second (Sunline) against first (Northerly) and third (Viscount) against first and second. After lengthy deliberations, stewards dismissed all three protests, and Northerly controversially retained the race. Nonetheless, Northerly had had an outstanding campaign, and the Cox Plate was his fourth win in-a-row.

Northerly returned to Perth, and his trainer Fred Kersley chose to run him in the Railway Stakes, which had been moved forward on the calendar. Unfortunately for the "home" crowd, the Cox Plate winner wilted badly in the home straight under 61.5 kilograms, and he finished an uncharacteristic 11th of 16 behind the Lindsey Smith trained Old Comrade, who again defeated Northerly in the Australian Cup in March.

Northerly had shown strong lead-up form to the Australian Cup, including a close second in the C F Orr Stakes over 1,400 metres at Caulfield and victory in the St George Stakes at the same venue a fortnight later, but Old Comrade came with a well-timed run to win the Cup in a boilover. After a tough campaign, with very little rest and stretching from August to March, Fred Kersley decided to give Northerly a good spell in the lead-up to his spring campaign.

=== Six-year-old season: 2002–2003 ===
After beginning his campaign in an unsuitably short sprint in Perth, Northerly arrived in Melbourne for the Memsie Stakes, but tried to bite one of his rivals, Fields of Omagh, and was unplaced. Backing up a week later, in the Craiglee Stakes, Northerly returned to the winner's circle, and made it three on the trot with wins in the Underwood and Turnbull Stakes. By running in the Turnbull, Kersley opened up the possibility of running Northerly over 2,400 metres for the first time, in the Caulfield Cup.

Well-positioned by Greg Childs in the first five runners, the incredibly slow pace helped Northerly overcome the big weight of 58 kilos. Northerly went to the lead at the 600m mark and held off the fast finishing Fields of Omagh and Republic Lass to win by a neck. Northerly's weight carrying feat eclipsed Sydeston's modern-day record of 57 kilos (set in 1990), while Fields of Omagh won two Cox Plates over the next four years. Northerly started favourite, and the typically fighting win was well received by the crowd on the day. Jockey Greg Childs said "With 58 kilos, the way the race was run, he was always open to be run down by a lighter-weighted horse. I let him stride at the 600 metres which is what Fred wanted. I knew he would be vulnerable to a lighter-weighted horse in the last 50 metres but he just kept going."

The next week the Caulfield Cup winner returned to Moonee Valley and repeated his feat of the previous year in winning the Cox Plate. In a high quality year, Northerly raced past Sunline (fourth) at the top of the straight, and held off Defier and Grandera, with Fields of Omagh and equal-favourite Lonhro further back. Speaking after his amazing spring, legendary Racing Steward Des Gleeson said that Northerly was "The champion of his era. His Caulfield Cup win was brilliant with the big weight, and he backed up in the Cox Plate and blitzed them. He has a big motor."

Trainer Fred Kersley ruled out running Northerly in the 2002 Melbourne Cup and reasoned that because he would have to carry 60 kilograms over 3,200 metres, and the fact that he possibly might not have stayed the trip, it may have taken too great a toll. In the week leading up to the Cox Plate, the eventual Melbourne Cup winner, Media Puzzle, had burst into calculations by winning the Geelong Cup by more than three lengths, and Northerly would have been conceding 7.5 kilograms to the imported galloper.

After a brilliant spring, Northerly's campaign autumn in 2003 failed to reach the same heights. Wins in the St George Stakes and the Australian Cup (by four lengths) were interspersed with defeats in the Orr Stakes and the Victoria Gold Cup, where he was defeated as a long-odds-on favourite by the hitherto unheralded Mr Trickster.

Northerly started odds-on favourite in all three starts, but failed to register the much desired win. In the Ranvet Stakes, he was run down by Sydney Oaks winner Republic Lass and in the Manion Cup, a Group 3 event, he was unplaced. Despite the first two failures it was the third and final race that was the target,The BMW Stakes. Sadly for connections and fans alike, Northerly was out slugged by 50/1 outsider Freemason, who set a course-record pace, and Northerly was unable to get the upper hand as the two horses duelled over the final 800 metres.

Nonetheless, judges felt he had done enough to receive his second Horse of the Year Award.

=== Seven-year-old season: 2003–2004 ===
In August 2003 swelling was found in his off-foreleg. This revealed a torn tendon, and with it, Northerly's career seemed over.

=== Eight-year-old season: 2004–2005 ===
Attempting to buck the odds, Northerly returned to the track in August 2004. Months of speculation ended when he galloped and then trialled successfully. A crowd of 30,000 descended on Belmont racecourse in Perth to see his return. Carrying 64.5 kilograms, Northerly was fourth most of the way and got to the lead in sight of the winning post, only to be swamped on the line. After he turned in substandard performances in the Underwood and Turnbull Stakes (both of which he had won in previous campaigns), Fred Kersley retired him.

Legendary racing writer Les Carlyon wrote of Northerly: "He fools you every time he races. He has the body language of a loser and a heart as big as the Nullarbor. He invariably looks to be struggling, a shambles of a horse blundering around on memory while his jockey pumps and blusters. Then he gets going. One instant Northerly looks beaten, the next he looks unbeatable. The closer he gets to the post, the harder he tries. He grinds on. And on. And on. He simply refuses to be beaten."

On 9 May 2012 Northerly was euthanised at his breeder's property in Busselton West Australia, following an attack of colic. He was 15 years old.

=== Course records ===
Flemington 2,000 m, 1:59.4 (Australian Cup 2001) (This race and track record was broken in 2005 by Makybe Diva.)

Caulfield 1,600 m, 1:35.1 (Carlyon Cup 2001)

== Race record ==
1999–2000 season as a three-year-old
Result	Date	Race	Venue	Group	Distance	Weight (kg)	Jockey	Winner/2nd
3rd	29 Mar 2000	3yo Hcp Restricted	Ascot	NA	1500 m	53.5	S. Miller	1st – Old Habits
Won	8 Apr 2000	Aquanita Stakes	Ascot	LR	1400 m	52	P. Carbery	2nd – Mr Callahan

2000–01 season as a four-year-old
Result	Date	Race	Venue	Group	Distance	Weight (kg)	Jockey	Winner/2nd
4th	11 Nov 2000	3yo & Up Hcp Restricted	Ascot	NA	1400 m	53.5	P. Carbery	1st – Great Beau
Won	30 Nov 2000	3yo & Up Hcp Restricted	Ascot	NA	1400 m	56.5	P. Carbery	2nd – Echoes
Won	23 Dec 2000	R J Peters Stakes	Ascot	G3	1500 m	52	P. Carbery	2nd – Special Jester
Won	30 Dec 2000	Railway Stakes	Ascot	G1	1600 m	51	D. Miller	2nd – Old Comrade
2nd	27 Jan 2001	Australia Day Stakes	Ascot	LR	1200 m	58	P. Carbery	1st – Exit Lane
Won	17 Feb 2001	Carlyon Cup	Caulfield	G2	1600 m	58	G. Childs	2nd – Oval Office
3rd	3 Mar 2001	Victoria Cup	Caulfield	NA	2024 m	59	B. Prebble	1st – Greenstone Charm
Won	12 Mar 2001	Australian Cup	Flemington	G1	2000 m	58	G. Childs	2nd – Hit the Roof

2001–02 season as a five-year-old
Result	Date	Race	Venue	Group	Distance	Weight (kg)	Jockey	Winner/2nd
Won	11 Aug 2001	Goodwood Sprint	Belmont	LR	1300 m	61	P. Carbery	2nd – Prince of Pop
2nd	25 Aug 2001	Farnley Stakes	Belmont	LR	1400 m	62	P. Carbery	1st – Corporate Bruce
Won	15 Sep 2001	J F Feehan Stakes	Moonee Valley	G2	1600 m	58	D. Oliver	2nd – Sunline
Won	23 Sep 2001	Underwood Stakes	Caulfield	G1	1800 m	58	D. Oliver	2nd – Universal Prince
Won	13 Oct 2001	Yalumba Stakes	Caulfield	G1	2000 m	58	D. Oliver	2nd – Shogun Lodge
Won	27 Oct 2001	Cox Plate	Moonee Valley	G1	2040 m	58	D. Oliver	2nd – Sunline
11th	24 Nov 2001	Railway Stakes	Ascot	G1	1600 m	61.5	D. Oliver	1st – Old Comrade
2nd	16 Feb 2002	C F Orr Stakes	Caulfield	G1	1400 m	58	D. Oliver	1st – Barkada
Won	2 Mar 2002	St George Stakes	Caulfield	G2	1800 m	58	D. Oliver	2nd – Old Comrade
2nd	11 Mar 2002	Australian Cup	Flemington	G1	2000 m	58	D. Oliver	1st – Old Comrade

2002–03 season as a six-year-old
Result	Date	Race	Venue	Group	Distance	Weight (kg)	Jockey	Winner/2nd
5th	17 Aug 2002	Goodwood Sprint	Belmont	LR	1300 m	60	P. Carbery	1st – Tribula
4th	31 Aug 2002	Memsie Stakes	Caulfield	G2	1410 m	58	D. Oliver	1st – Magical Miss
Won	7 Sep 2002	Craiglee Stakes	Flemington	G2	1600 m	58	G. Childs	2nd – Le Zagaletta
Won	22 Sep 2002	Underwood Stakes	Caulfield	G1	1800 m	58	G. Childs	2nd – Magical Miss
Won	5 Oct 2002	Turnbull Stakes	Flemington	G2	2000 m	59	G. Childs	2nd – Dash For Cash
Won	19 Oct 2002	Caulfield Cup	Caulfield	G1	2400 m	58	G. Childs	2nd – Fields of Omagh
Won	26 Oct 2002	Cox Plate	Moonee Valley	G1	2040 m	58	P. Payne	2nd – Defier
4th	8 Feb 2003	C F Orr Stakes	Caulfield	G1	1400 m	58	P. Payne	1st – Yell
Won	22 Feb 2003	St George Stakes	Caulfield	G2	1800 m	58	P. Payne	2nd – Fields of Omagh
2nd	1 Mar 2003	Victoria Cup	Caulfield	LR	2020 m	60	P. Payne	1st – Mr Trickster
Won	10 Mar 2003	Australian Cup	Flemington	G1	2000 m	58	P. Payne	2nd – Natural Blitz
2nd	29 Mar 2003	Ranvet Stakes	Rosehill	G1	2000 m	58	P. Payne	1st – Republic Lass
6th	5 Apr 2003	Manion Cup	Rosehill	G3	2400 m	61	P. Payne	1st – Grand City
2nd	12 Apr 2003	The BMW Stakes	Rosehill	G1	2400 m	58	P. Payne	1st – Freemason

2003–04 season as a seven-year-old
Result	Race
Nil	Northerly was unraced as a seven-year-old due to a torn tendon

2004–05 season as an eight-year-old
Result	Date	Race	Venue	Group	Distance	Weight (kg)	Jockey	Winner/2nd
4th	11 Sep 2004	Walter Brooke Hcp	Belmont	NA	1600 m	64.5	P. Carbery	1st – Royal Minx
10th	19 Sep 2004	Underwood Stakes	Caulfield	G1	1800 m	58	P. Carbery	1st – Elvstroem
9th	2 Oct 2004	Turnbull Stakes	Flemington	G2	2000 m	59	M. Flaherty	1st – Elvstroem

== Pedigree ==
Pedigree of Northerly (Aus)
Sire Serheed (USA) 1980	Nijinsky (Can); 1967	Northern Dancer (Can); 1961	Nearctic (Can)
Sire Serheed (USA) 1980	Nijinsky (Can); 1967	Northern Dancer (Can); 1961	Natalma (USA)
Sire Serheed (USA) 1980	Nijinsky (Can); 1967	Flaming Page (Can); 1959	Bull Page (USA)
Sire Serheed (USA) 1980	Nijinsky (Can); 1967	Flaming Page (Can); 1959	Flaring Top (USA)
Sire Serheed (USA) 1980	Native Partner (USA); 1966	Raise a Native (USA); 1961	Native Dancer (USA)
Sire Serheed (USA) 1980	Native Partner (USA); 1966	Raise a Native (USA); 1961	Raise You (USA)
Sire Serheed (USA) 1980	Native Partner (USA); 1966	Dinner Partner (USA); 1959	Tom Fool (USA)
Sire Serheed (USA) 1980	Native Partner (USA); 1966	Dinner Partner (USA); 1959	Bluehaze (USA)
Dam North Bell (Aus) 1988	Bellwater (Fr); 1982	Bellypha (Ire); 1976	Lyphard (USA)
Dam North Bell (Aus) 1988	Bellwater (Fr); 1982	Bellypha (Ire); 1976	Belga (Fr)
Dam North Bell (Aus) 1988	Bellwater (Fr); 1982	Paddle (Fr); 1975	Jim French (USA)
Dam North Bell (Aus) 1988	Bellwater (Fr); 1982	Paddle (Fr); 1975	Pram (Fr)
Dam North Bell (Aus) 1988	North Fleur (Can); 1981	Far North (Can); 1973	Northern Dancer (Can)
Dam North Bell (Aus) 1988	North Fleur (Can); 1981	Far North (Can); 1973	Fleur (Can)
Dam North Bell (Aus) 1988	North Fleur (Can); 1981	Yoka (USA); 1976	Triple Bend (USA)
Dam North Bell (Aus) 1988	North Fleur (Can); 1981	Yoka (USA); 1976	Royal Hula (USA) (Family: No.9)
