= How Now Stakes =

- Class: Group 3
- Location: Caulfield Racecourse, Melbourne, Australia
- Inaugurated: 1999
- Race type: Thoroughbred
- Sponsor: Sportsbet (2024-26)

Race information
- Distance: 1,200 metres
- Surface: Turf
- Qualification: Mares four year old and older
- Weight: Set weights with penalties
- Purse: $200,000 (2026)

The How Now Stakes, Melbourne Racing Club Group 3 Thoroughbred horse race held under set weights with penalties conditions, for mares aged four years old and upwards, over a distance of 1200 metres in September. It is held at Caulfield Racecourse in Melbourne, Australia.

== History ==
The registered race is named after the brilliant filly How Now, who won the 1976 Underwood Stakes. This race is held on the same card as the Underwood Stakes.

=== Distance ===
From 1999 onwards held over 1200m

=== Grade ===
- 1999–2004 - Listed Race
- 2005 onwards - Group 3.

=== Name ===
- 1999 - Cranbourne Daihatsu Stakes
- 2000–2001 - Dairy Farmers Milk Stakes
- 2002 - Dubai Convention Bureau Stakes
- 2003–2004 - Emirates Racing Association Stakes
- 2005 - Dubai International Stakes
- 2006 - How Now Stakes
- 2007 - South Yarra Stakes
- 2008–2011 - How Now Stakes
- 2012–2014 - Sportingbet Sprint Series Heat 2 Stakes
- 2015 - William Hill Sprint Series Heat 2 Stakes
- 2016 - Ladbrokes Odds Boost Stakes

== Winners ==
Past winners of the race are as follows:

- 2026 - Point Barrow
- 2025 - Proved
- 2024 - Niance
- 2023 - Rose Quartz
- 2022 - Zapateo
- 2021 - Bella Nipotina
- 2020 - Felicia
- 2019 - Manicure
- 2018 - Winter Bride
- 2017 - Savanna Amour
- 2016 - Secret Agenda
- 2015 - Politeness
- 2014 - Girl Guide
- 2013 - Catkins
- 2012 - Detours
- 2011 - Sister Madly
- 2010 - Valentine Miss
- 2009 - Velocitea
- 2008 - Vivacious Spirit
- 2007 - Miss Judgement
- 2006 - Queen Of The Hill
- 2005 - †Sarah Michelle / Brindabella
- 2004 - Strikeline
- 2003 - Lovely Jubly
- 2002 - Taimana
- 2001 - Miss Power Bird
- 2000 - Piavonic
- 1999 - Snippets' Lass

† Dead heat

== See also ==
- Caulfield Guineas Prelude
- Naturalism Stakes
- Sir Rupert Clarke Stakes
- Thousand Guineas Prelude
- Underwood Stakes
- List of Australian Group races
- Group races
