= Underwood Stakes =

Horse race in Melbourne, Victoria, Australia

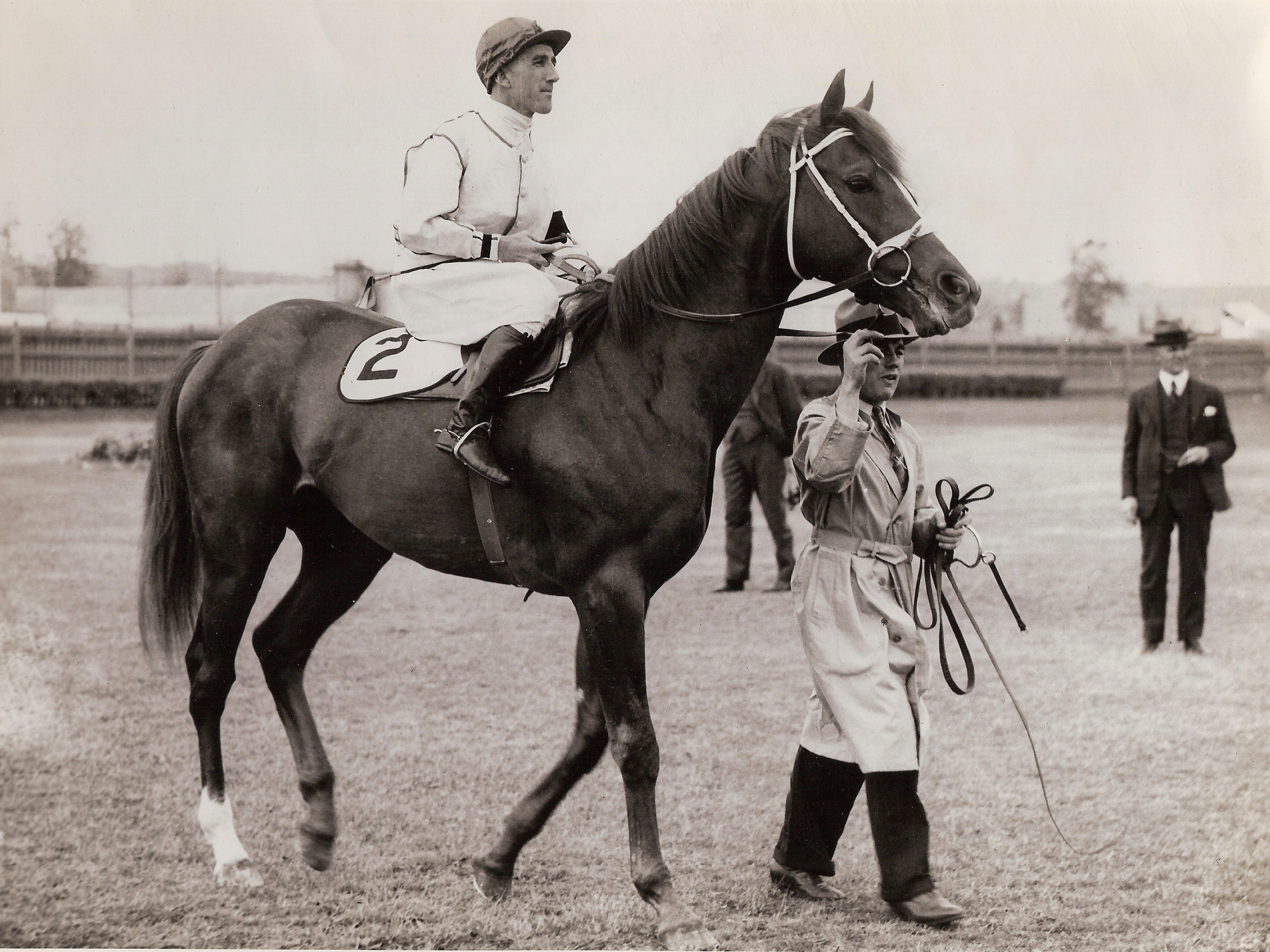
- Ajax, 1938, 1939, 1940 winner
- Class: Group 1
- Location: Caulfield Racecourse, Melbourne, Australia
- Inaugurated: 1924
- Race type: Thoroughbred
- Sponsor: Henley Homes (2026)

Race information
- Distance: 1,800 metres
- Surface: Turf
- Qualification: Three year old and older
- Weight: Weight for Age
- Purse: $1,000,000 (2026)
- Bonuses: Winner exempt from ballot in the Caulfield Cup

The Underwood Stakes is a Melbourne Racing Club Group 1 Thoroughbred horse race, run over 1800 metres under weight-for-age conditions, held at Caulfield Racecourse, Melbourne, Australia in late September each year.

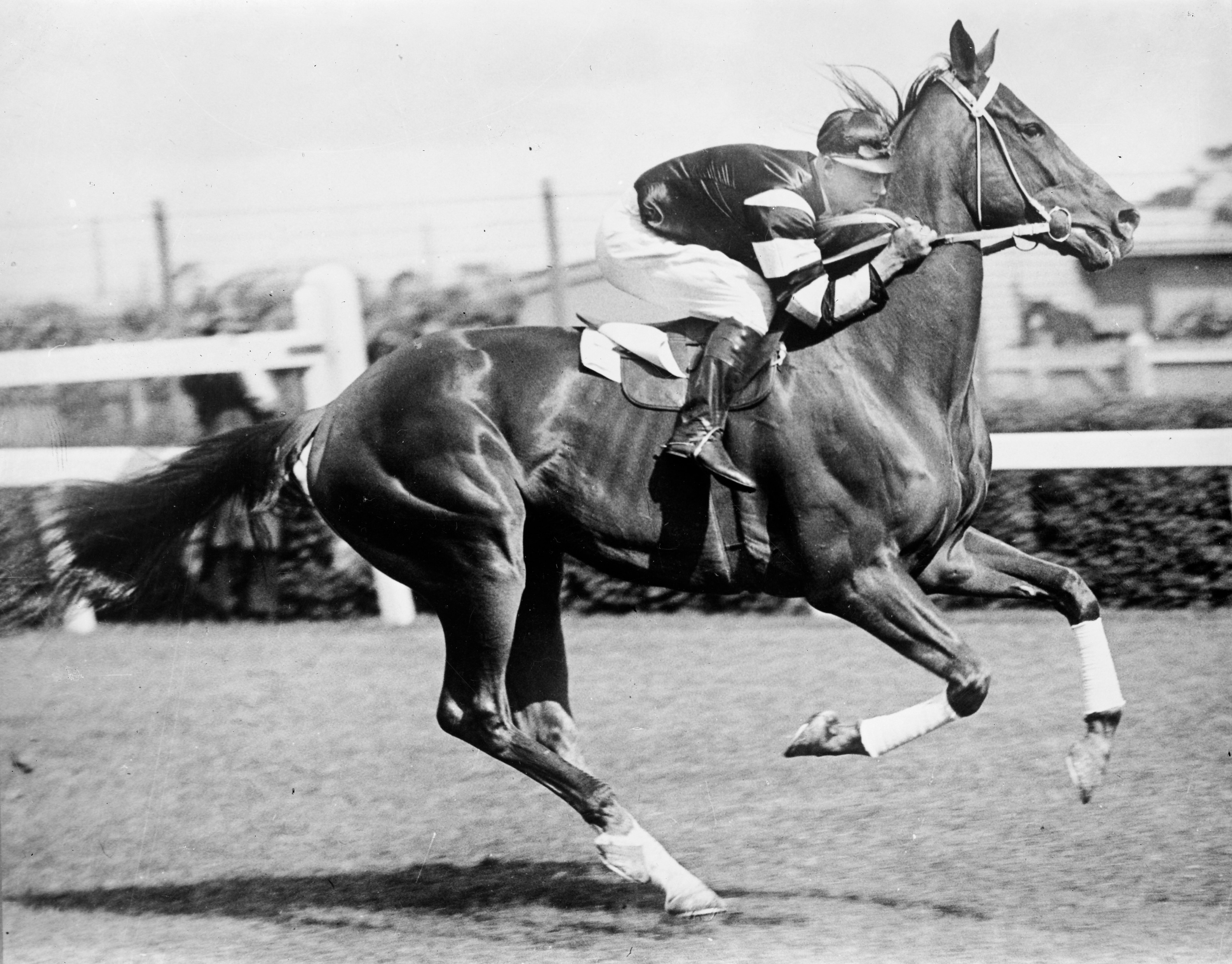
Phar Lap, 1931 winner

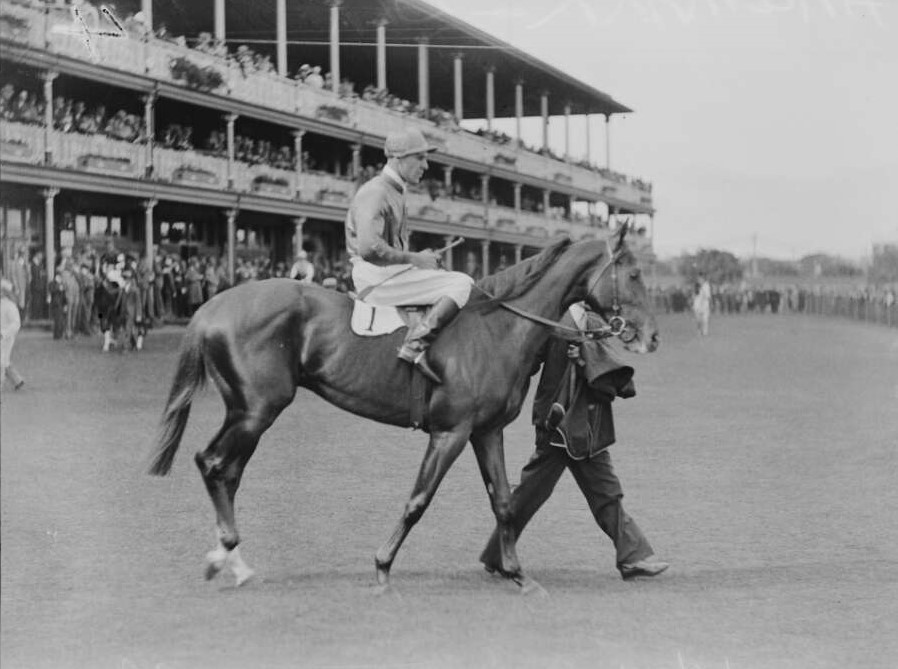
Hall Mark, 1933 & 1934 winner

== History ==
It has been won by notable champions of the past such as Heroic, Phar Lap, Ajax, Tobin Bronze, Octagonal and Northerly.

Prior to 1994 the race was held on Royal Melbourne Show Day which used to be observed on the Thursday in the last full week of September as a public holiday.

=== 1952 racebook ===
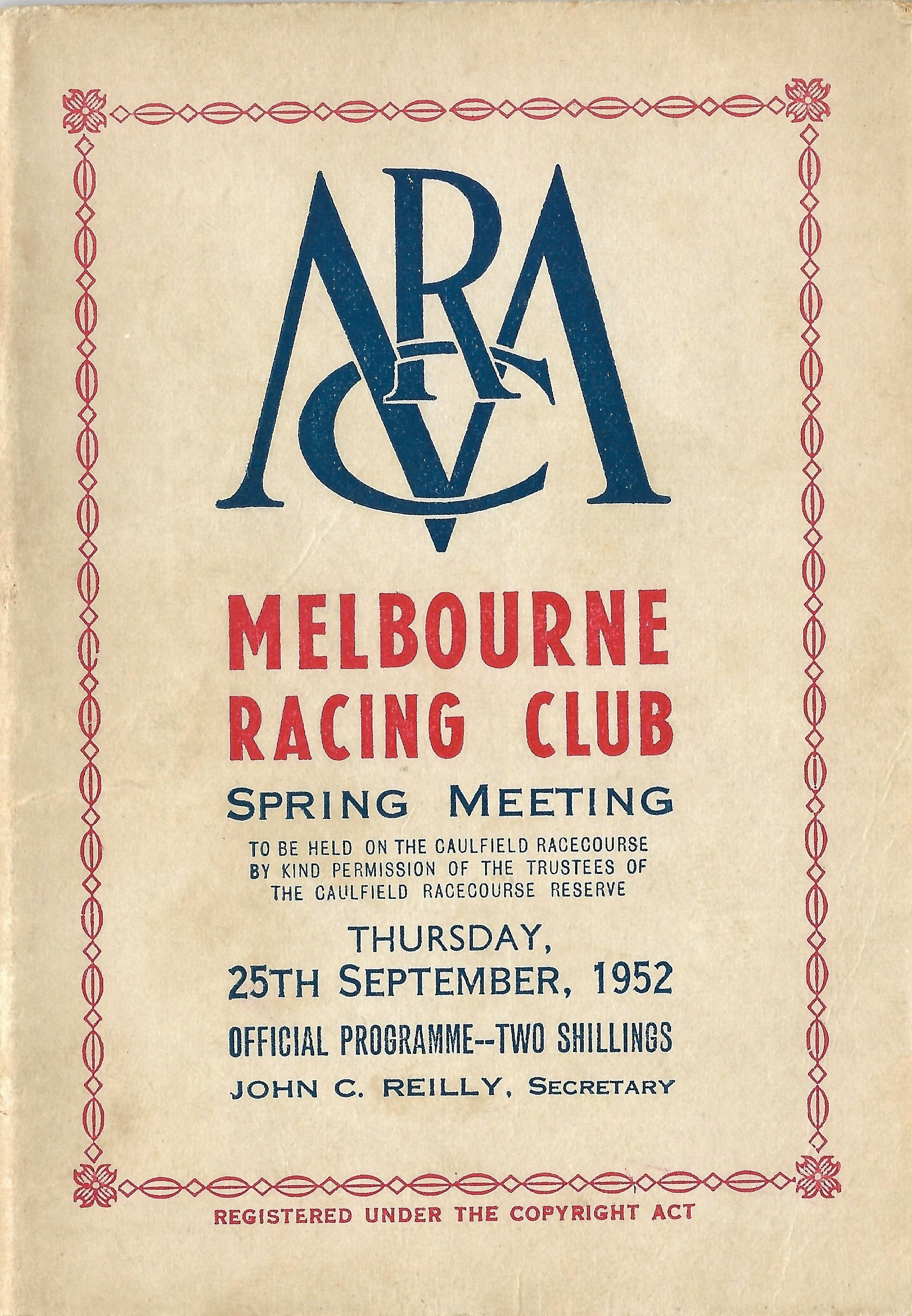
1952 VATC Underwood Stakes racebook front cover

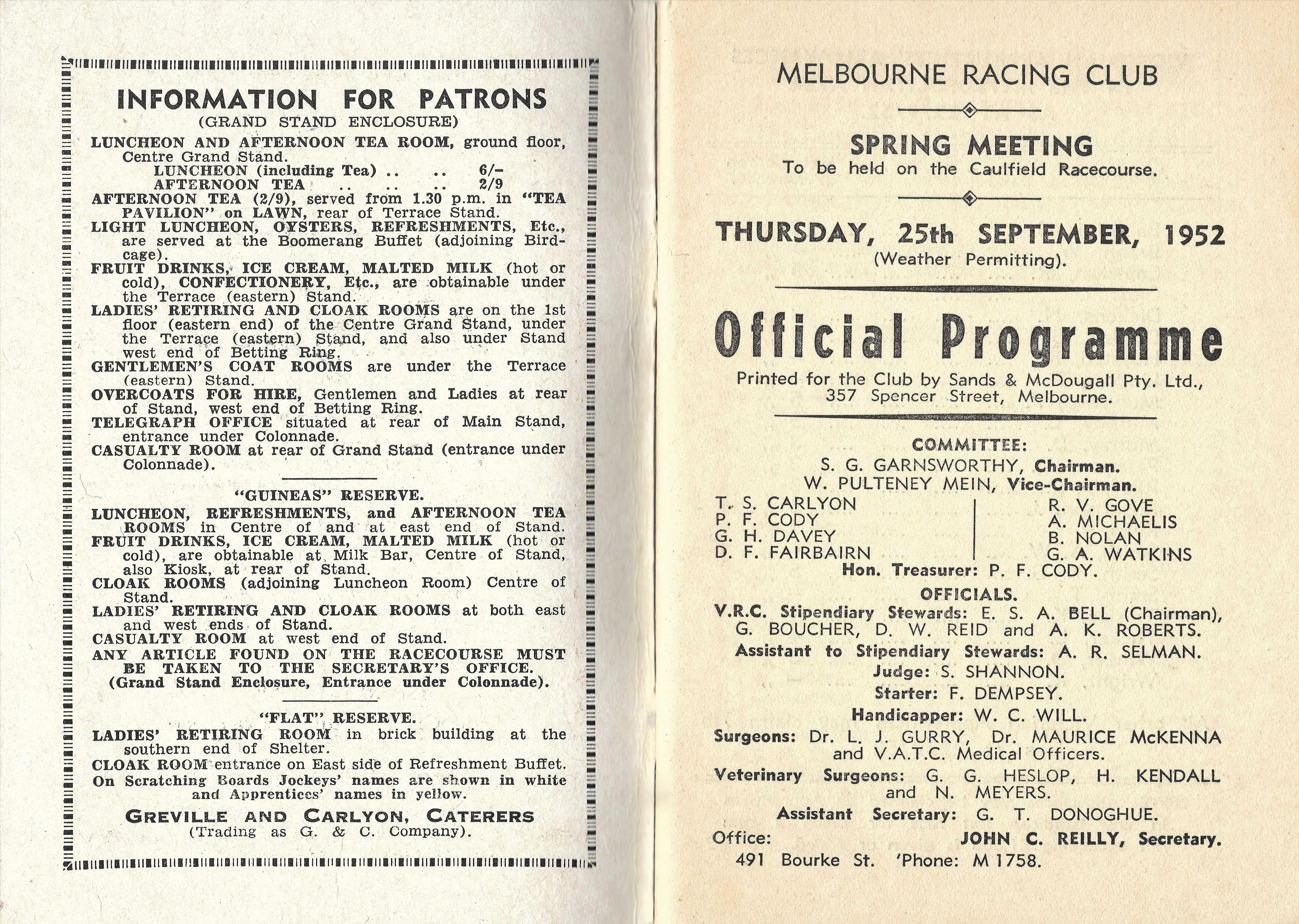
1952 VATC Underwood Stakes showing raceday officials

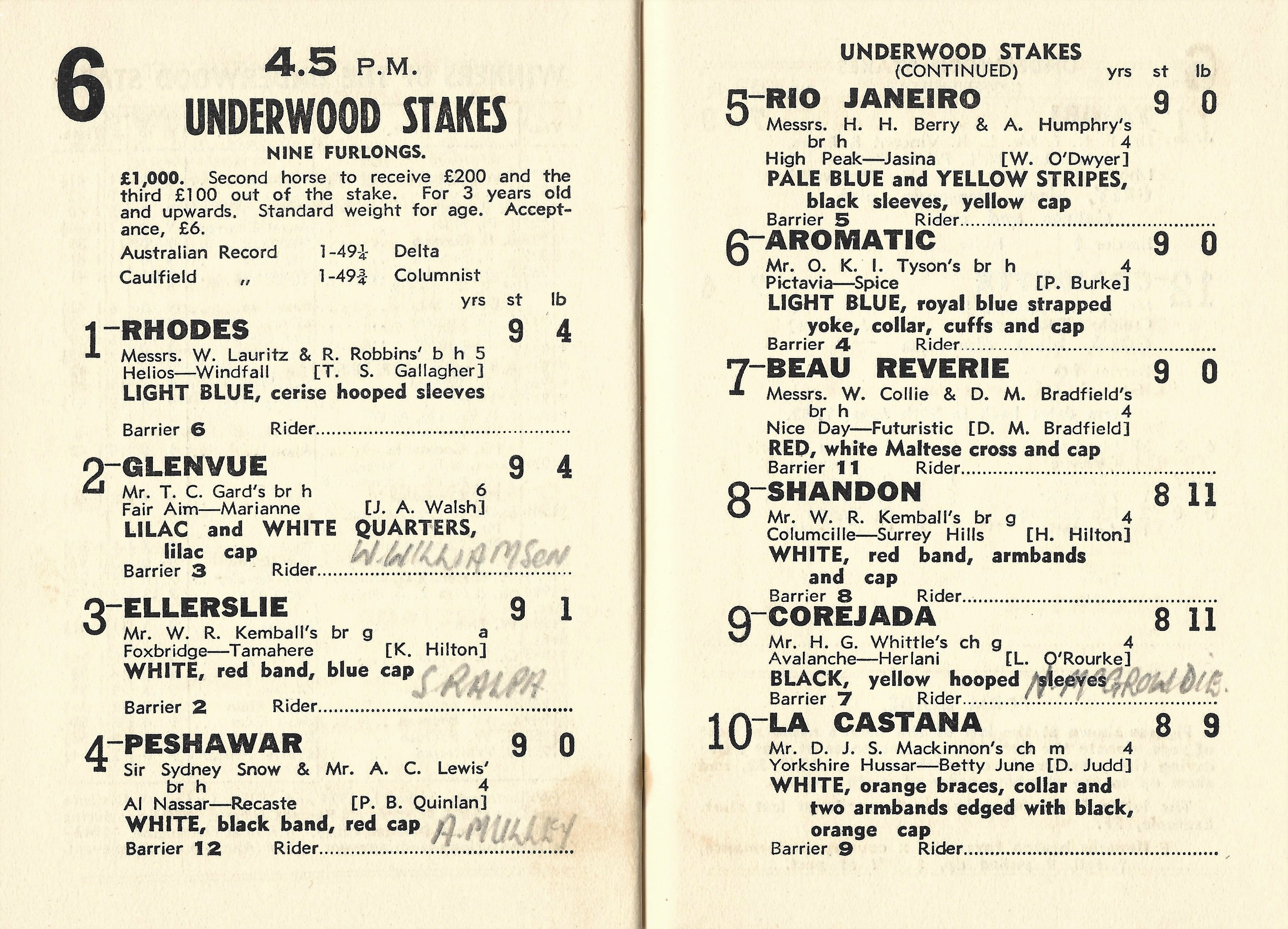
1952 VATC Underwood Stakes showing the winner, Ellerslie

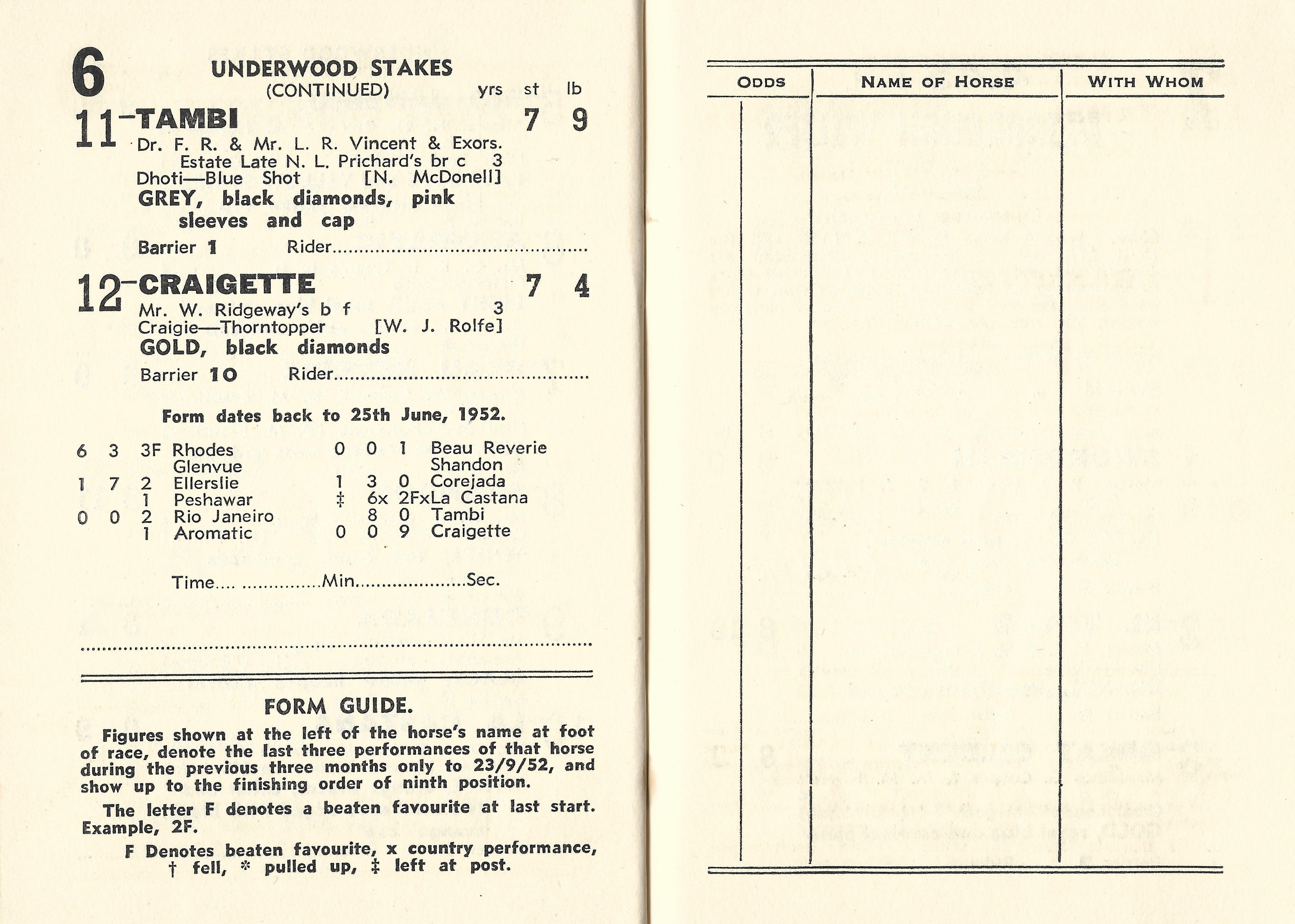
1952 VATC Underwood Stakes starters and results

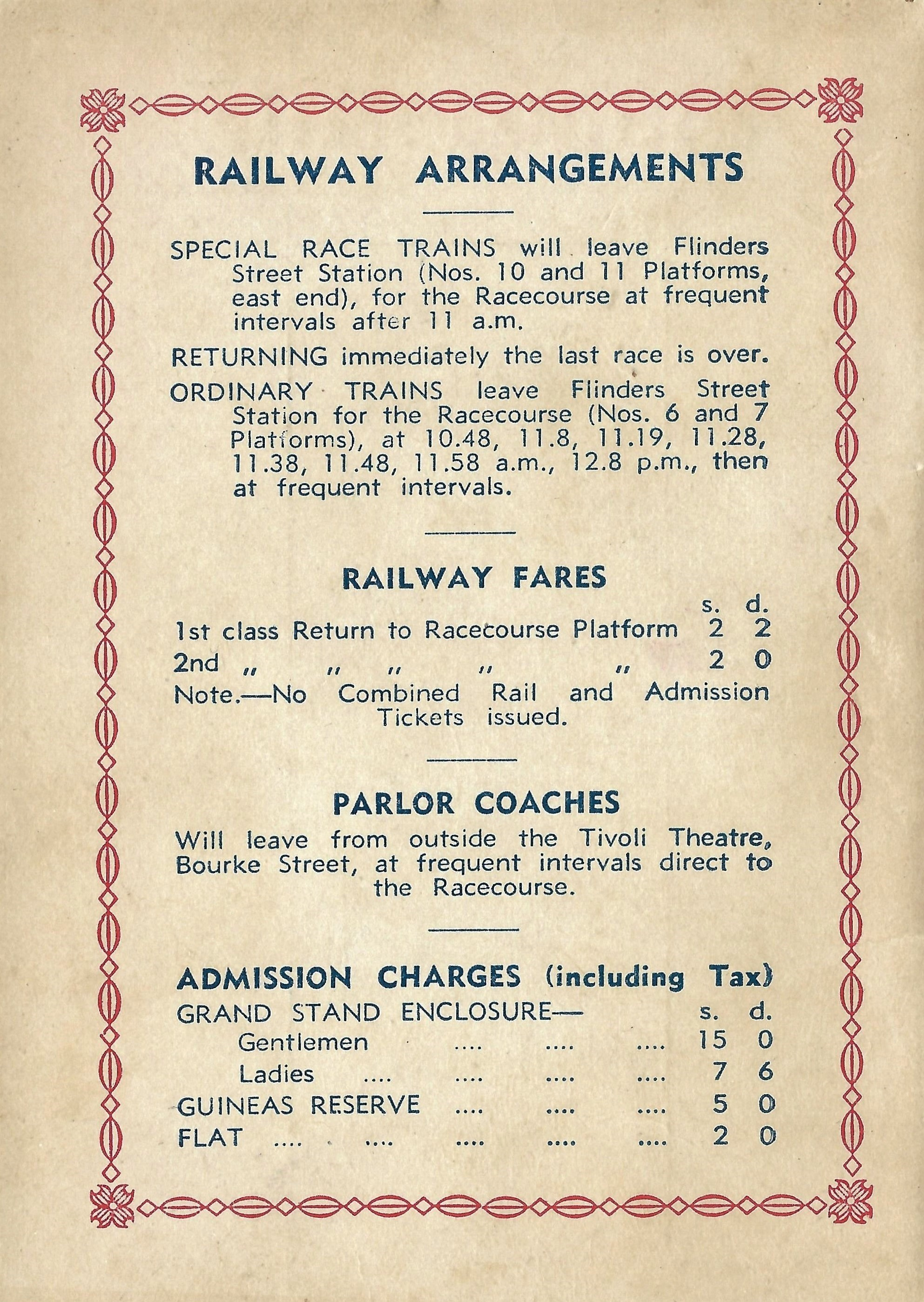
Back cover showing railway & entrance charges

=== Venue ===
- 1924–1947 held by Williamstown Racing Club at Williamstown Racecourse.
- 1948 onwards held at Caulfield Racecourse.
- 2021 - 2022 held at Sandown Racecourse (Hillside track).

=== Grade ===
- 1924–1978 - Principal Race
- 1979 onwards Group 1

=== Distance ===
- 1924–1948 - 1 mile (~1600m)
- 1943 - 7 furlongs (~1400m)
- 1949–1953 held over 1 1/8 miles (~1800m)
- 1954–1971 held over 1 1/4 miles (~2000m)
- 1972–1993 held over 2000m
- 1994 onwards held over 1800m.
- Note: two runnings in 1944.

== Winners ==
The following are past winners of the race.

- 2026 - Birdman
- 2025 - Sir Delius
- 2024 - Buckaroo
- 2023 - Alligator Blood
- 2022 - Alligator Blood
- 2021 - Zaaki
- 2020 - Russian Camelot
- 2019 - Black Heart Bart
- 2018 - Homesman
- 2017 - Bonneval
- 2016 - Black Heart Bart
- 2015 - Mourinho
- 2014 - Foreteller
- 2013 - It's a Dundeel
- 2012 - Ocean Park
- 2011 - Lion Tamer
- 2010 - So You Think
- 2009 - Heart Of Dreams
- 2008 - Weekend Hussler
- 2007 - Rubiscent
- 2006 - El Segundo
- 2005 - Perlin
- 2004 - Elvstroem
- 2003 - Mummify
- 2002 - Northerly
- 2001 - Northerly
- 2000 - Oliver Twist
- 1999 - Intergaze
- 1998 - Tie the Knot
- 1997 - Always Aloof
- 1996 - Octagonal
- 1995 - Sharscay
- 1994 - Jeune
- 1993 - Runyon
- 1992 - Prince Salieri
- 1991 - Dr. Grace
- 1990 - The Phantom
- 1989 - Almaarad
- 1988 - Authaal
- 1987 - Rubiton
- 1986 - Bonecrusher
- 1985 - Tristarc
- 1984 - Bounty Hawk
- 1983 - Trissaro
- 1982 - Fearless Pride
- 1981 - Sovereign Red
- 1980 - †My Brown Jug / Waitangirua
- 1979 - Valley Of Georgia
- 1978 - So Called
- 1977 - Denise's Joy
- 1976 - How Now
- 1975 - Taras Bulba
- 1974 - Frozen Section
- 1973 - Scotch And Dry
- 1972 - Sobar
- 1971 - Gay Icarus
- 1970 - Big Philou
- 1969 - Rain Lover
- 1968 - Lowland
- 1967 - Future
- 1966 - Tobin Bronze
- 1965 - Future
- 1964 - Contempler
- 1963 - Havelock
- 1962 - Aquanita
- 1961 - Aquanita
- 1960 - Lord
- 1959 - Trellios
- 1958 - Lord
- 1957 - Syntax
- 1956 - Ray Ribbon
- 1955 - Cromis
- 1954 - Flying Halo
- 1953 - Flying Halo
- 1952 - Ellerslie
- 1951 - Laurie Hussar
- 1950 - Beau Gem
- 1949 - Beau Gem
- 1948 - Royal Gem
- 1947 - Attley
- 1946 - Attley
- 1945 - St. Fairy
- 1944 - ‡Amana / Tea Cake
- 1943 - Gay Revelry
- 1942 - race not held
- 1941 - Sun Valley
- 1940 - Ajax
- 1939 - Ajax
- 1938 - Ajax
- 1937 - Young Idea
- 1936 - Peter Fils
- 1935 - Young Idea
- 1934 - Hall Mark
- 1933 - Hall Mark
- 1932 - Liberal
- 1931 - Phar Lap
- 1930 - Waterline
- 1929 - Highland
- 1928 - Highland
- 1927 - Royal Charter
- 1926 - Heroic
- 1925 - Whittier
- 1924 - Whittier

† Dead heat
‡ Run in divisions

== See also ==
- Caulfield Guineas Prelude
- How Now Stakes
- Naturalism Stakes
- Sir Rupert Clarke Stakes
- Thousand Guineas Prelude
- List of Australian Group races
- Group races
