= Trip To Paris =

Irish-bred Thoroughbred racehorse

- Racing silks of La Grange Partnership
- Sire: Champs Elysees
- Grandsire: Danehill
- Dam: La Grande Zoa
- Damsire: Fantastic Light
- Sex: Gelding
- Foaled: 8 February 2011
- Country: Ireland
- Color: Bay
- Breeder: Paul Monaghan & T J Monaghan
- Owner: La Grange Partnership
- Trainer: Ed Dunlop
- Record: 27: 6-3-3
- Earnings: £808,062

Major wins
- Chester Cup (2015); Ascot Gold Cup (2015)

Trip To Paris (foaled 8 February 2011) is an Irish-bred, British-trained Thoroughbred racehorse. After showing modest form in his first two seasons he emerged as a top-class stayer as a four-year-old in 2015 after being gelded, winning the Chester Cup in May before recording his biggest win in the Ascot Gold Cup. He failed to win again after his Gold Cup success but was placed in a number of major races including a second in the Caulfield Cup. He was retired in July 2017 having won six of his twenty-seven races and earning over £800,000 in prize money.

== Background ==
Trip To Paris is a bay gelding with a broad white blaze bred in Ireland by Paul Monaghan & T J Monaghan. He is from the first crop of foals sired by Champs Elysees whose wins included the Hollywood Turf Cup Stakes, Northern Dancer Turf Stakes and Canadian International Stakes. Trip To Paris's dam La Grande Zoa showed no ability as a racehorse but was a granddaughter of Royal Sister, a broodmare who produced Ezzoud and Distant Relative (Sussex Stakes, Prix du Moulin).

As a foal, Trip To Paris was offered for sale at Tattersalls in November 2011 and was bought for 37,000 guineas by Oak Farm Stables. He was sent back to Tattersalls a year later but was bought back by his vendor. In May 2013 he appeared at Tattersalls for a third time and was bought for 20,000 guineas by the bloodstock agent Federico Barberini. He entered the ownership of the La Grange Partnership and was sent into training with Ed Dunlop at Newmarket, Suffolk.

== Racing career ==
=== 2013: two-year-old season ===
Trip To Paris began his racing career in a seven furlong maiden race at Sandown Park Racecourse on 17 July and finished fourteenth of the sixteen runners behind Shifting Power. A week later he started at odds of 7/1 for a maiden on the Polytrack surface at Lingfield Park and recorded his first success, beating Floating Ballerino by one and three quarter lengths. On his only other appearance of the season he finished second to Chief Barker in a Nursery handicap at Newmarket Racecourse in August.

=== 2014: three-year-old season ===
In the early part of 2014, Trip To Paris finished seventh in the Investec Derby Trial, tenth in a handicap at Musselburgh Racecourse and sixth in the King George V Stakes at Royal Ascot. In July he recorded his only win of the year when he carried top weight of 133 pounds to victory in a handicap over one and a half miles at Ascot. He made no impact in his remaining three races, finishing unplaced in two handicaps at Ascot and then finishing fourth of five in a handicap at Great Yarmouth Racecourse in September.

At the end of the year, Trip To Paris was gelded.

=== 2015: four-year-old season ===
On his first appearance as a four-year-old, Trip To Paris finished fourth in a handicap over eleven furlongs on the polytrack at Kempton Park Racecourse on 28 March and then won a similar event at Lingfield on 11 April. Two weeks later he was moved up in distance for a handicap over two miles at Ripon Racecourse and started at odds of 8/1 under a weight of 132 pounds. Ridden for the first time by the former National Hunt jockey Graham Lee he took the lead approaching the final furlong and drew away to win by three and a half lengths from Gabrial's King. On 6 May Trip To Paris carried 121 pounds in the 183rd running of the Chester Cup over two and a quarter miles on the Roodeye. After racing in mid-division he made rapid progress approaching the final furlong, took the lead in the last strides and won by three quarters of a length from the favourite Quick Jack. Three weeks later, Trip To Paris was moved up in class to contest the Group Three Henry II Stakes at Sandown. After struggling to obtain a clear run in the straight, he finished strongly to take second place, one and three quarter lengths behind the winner Vent de Force. On 12 June it was announced that the La Grange Partnership had agreed to pay a supplementary entry fee of £35,000 to run the horse in the Ascot Gold Cup. Ed Dunlop commented "This hasn't been an easy call, with £35,000 a hefty sum of money, but he's a young, progressive stayer who enjoys quick ground".

On 18 June, Trip To Paris, again ridden by Lee, started at odds of 12/1 for the 207th running of the Gold Cup over two and a half miles at Ascot Racecourse. The unbeaten Irish horse Forgotten Rules started favourite, whilst the other leading contenders included Mizzou (Sagaro Stakes), Kingfisher (Dee Stakes, Saval Beg Stakes), Tac de Boistron (Prix Royal Oak), Vent de Force, Bathyrhon (Prix Vicomtesse Vigier) and Simenon (Ascot Stakes, Queen Alexandra Stakes). Lee restrained the gelding in the early stages before moving forward on the inside in the straight. Trip To Paris took the lead inside the final furlong and won by one and a quarter lengths from Kingfisher, with Forgotten Rules a neck away in third. After the race, Lee said "He gave me a great ride. When I got on him in the parade ring he was so switched off and relaxed, he raced that way and conserved his energy. He picked up great and deserved it".

At Goodwood Racecourse, Trip To Paris carried top weight of 138 pounds in the two-mile Goodwood Cup and started the 5/1 second favourite in an eleven runners field. After being held up by Lee in the early stages he stayed on strongly in the straight and finished third, beaten a neck and a short head by Big Orange and Quest For More, both of whom were carrying 134.

On 3 November, Trip to Paris ran in the Melbourne Cup at Flemington Racecourse where he finished a highly creditable 4th place.

== Pedigree ==
Pedigree of Trip To Paris (IRE), bay gelding, 2011
Sire Champs Elysees (GB) 2003	Danehill (USA); 1986	Danzig	Northern Dancer
Sire Champs Elysees (GB) 2003	Danehill (USA); 1986	Danzig	Pas de Nom
Sire Champs Elysees (GB) 2003	Danehill (USA); 1986	Razyana	His Majesty
Sire Champs Elysees (GB) 2003	Danehill (USA); 1986	Razyana	Spring Adieu
Sire Champs Elysees (GB) 2003	Hasili (IRE); 1991	Kahyasi	Ile de Bourbon
Sire Champs Elysees (GB) 2003	Hasili (IRE); 1991	Kahyasi	Kadissya
Sire Champs Elysees (GB) 2003	Hasili (IRE); 1991	Kerali	High Line
Sire Champs Elysees (GB) 2003	Hasili (IRE); 1991	Kerali	Sookera
Dam La Grande Zoa (IRE) 2003	Fantastic Light (USA); 1996	Rahy	Blushing Groom
Dam La Grande Zoa (IRE) 2003	Fantastic Light (USA); 1996	Rahy	Glorious Song
Dam La Grande Zoa (IRE) 2003	Fantastic Light (USA); 1996	Jood	Nijinsky
Dam La Grande Zoa (IRE) 2003	Fantastic Light (USA); 1996	Jood	Kamar
Dam La Grande Zoa (IRE) 2003	Majestic Sister (IRE); 1995	Last Tycoon	Try My Best
Dam La Grande Zoa (IRE) 2003	Majestic Sister (IRE); 1995	Last Tycoon	Mill Princess
Dam La Grande Zoa (IRE) 2003	Majestic Sister (IRE); 1995	Royal Sister	Claude
Dam La Grande Zoa (IRE) 2003	Majestic Sister (IRE); 1995	Royal Sister	Ribasha (Family 13-c)
