= Alligator Blood (horse) =

Australian thoroughbred racehorse

- Sire: All Too Hard
- Grandsire: Casino Prince
- Dam: Lake Superior
- Damsire: Encosta De Lago
- Sex: Gelding
- Foaled: 19 September 2016
- Country: Australia
- Colour: Bay
- Breeder: Gerry Harvey
- Owner: Gerry Harvey, J & R Simpson
- Trainer: David Vandyke (2018-2020); Billy Healey (2021); Gai Waterhouse & Adrian Bott (2022 onwards)
- Record: 35: 15-5-3
- Earnings: A$ 8,125,525

Major wins
- Caulfield Guineas Prelude (2019); Vo Rogue Plate (2019); C S Hayes Stakes (2020); Australian Guineas (2020); Stradbroke Handicap (2022); Underwood Stakes (2022, 2023); Champions Mile (2022); Futurity Stakes (2023); Caulfield Stakes (2023)

Alligator Blood (foaled 19 September 2016) is a seven-time Group 1 winning Australian bred thoroughbred racehorse.

== Background ==
Bred by Australian entrepreneur Gerry Harvey, Alligator Blood was sold at the 2018 Magic Millions sale (Lot 22) for A$55,000 to the Ezybonds No 1 Syndicate.

== Racing career ==
Alligator Blood's first Group 1 victory was in the 2020 Australian Guineas.

In early 2022, Alligator Blood was banned from racing in the state of New South Wales. Racing NSW stated this was due to the majority owner being an undischarged bankrupt and not meeting the standard for horse ownership in New South Wales. In August 2022, Alligator Blood was also banned from racing in the state of Victoria by integrity officials.

Alligator Blood returned to racing and convincingly won Queensland's premier racing event, the 2022 Group 1 Stradbroke Handicap.

Alligator Blood was first past the post in the 2020 Magic Millions Guineas, but was later disqualified after returning a positive swab to Altrenogest.

== Pedigree ==
Pedigree of Alligator Blood
Sire All Too Hard 2009	Casino Prince 2003	Flying Spur	Danehill
Sire All Too Hard 2009	Casino Prince 2003	Flying Spur	Rolls
Sire All Too Hard 2009	Casino Prince 2003	Lady Capel	Last Tycoon
Sire All Too Hard 2009	Casino Prince 2003	Lady Capel	Kew Gardens
Sire All Too Hard 2009	Helsinge 2001	Desert Sun	Green Desert
Sire All Too Hard 2009	Helsinge 2001	Desert Sun	Solar
Sire All Too Hard 2009	Helsinge 2001	Scandinavia	Snippets
Sire All Too Hard 2009	Helsinge 2001	Scandinavia	Song of Norway
Dam Lake Superior 2006	Encosta De Lago 1993	Fairy King	Northern Dancer
Dam Lake Superior 2006	Encosta De Lago 1993	Fairy King	Fairy Bridge
Dam Lake Superior 2006	Encosta De Lago 1993	Shoal Creek	Star Way
Dam Lake Superior 2006	Encosta De Lago 1993	Shoal Creek	Rolls
Dam Lake Superior 2006	Kylikwong 2001	Red Ransom	Roberto
Dam Lake Superior 2006	Kylikwong 2001	Red Ransom	Arabia
Dam Lake Superior 2006	Kylikwong 2001	Tracys Element	Last Tycoon
Dam Lake Superior 2006	Kylikwong 2001	Tracys Element	Princess Tracy
