= Caulfield Autumn Classic =

- Class: Group 2
- Location: Caulfield Racecourse
- Inaugurated: 1957
- Race type: Thoroughbred
- Sponsor: Stow Storage (2022-26)

Race information
- Distance: 1,800 metres
- Surface: Turf
- Qualification: Three-year-olds
- Weight: Set weights
- Purse: $300,000 (2026)

The Caulfield Autumn Classic is a Melbourne Racing Club Group 2 Thoroughbred horse race for horses three years old held under Set Weights conditions, over a distance of 1800 metres at Caulfield Racecourse in Melbourne, Australia in February.

== History ==
=== Name ===
- 1957–1986 - Stanley Plate
- 1987–1990 - Caulfield Autumn Classic
- 1991 - Tattersalls Classic
- 1991–1997 - Caulfield Autumn Classic
- 1998–2000 - AAMI Classic
- 2001–2004 - Shannons Classic
- 2005–2006 - Caulfield Autumn Classic
- 2007 - National Jockey Celebration Day
- 2008 - Pol Roger Stakes
- 2009 - The Yalumba 160
- 2010 - The Yalumba 161
- 2011 - The Yalumba 162
- 2012 onwards - Caulfield Autumn Classic

=== Distance ===
- 1957–1970 - 1 1/4 miles (~2000 metres)
- 1971 - 1 1/8 (~1800 metres)
- 1972 - 1 1/4 miles (~2000 metres)
- 1973–1986 – 2000 metres
- 1987 onwards - 1800 metres

=== Grade ===
- 1957–1978 - Principal Race
- 1979–1988 - Listed Race
- 1989–1993 - Group 3
- 1994 onwards Group 2

=== Venue ===
In 1996 the event was held at Flemington Racecourse due to reconstruction of Caulfield Racecourse. In 2023 the race was held at Sandown Racecourse.

== Winners ==
The following are past winners of the race.

- 2026 - Single Choice
- 2025 - Shanwah
- 2024 - Immediacy
- 2023 - Pericles
- 2022 - Castlereagh Kid
- 2021 - Parure
- 2020 - Adelaide Ace
- 2019 - Global Exchange
- 2018 - Valiant Spirit
- 2017 - Farson
- 2016 - Tally
- 2015 - Alpine Eagle
- 2014 - Vilanova
- 2013 - Super Cool
- 2012 - Upbeat
- 2011 - Folding Gear
- 2010 - Extra Zero
- 2009 - Stokehouse
- 2008 - Brom Brom
- 2007 - Ambitious General
- 2006 - Spinney
- 2005 - Renewable
- 2004 - Elvstroem
- 2003 - Natural Blitz
- 2002 - Don Eduardo
- 2001 - Fubu
- 2000 - Pins
- 1999 - Dignity Dancer
- 1998 - Gold Guru
- 1997 - Silver Glade
- 1996 - Iron Horse
- 1995 - Hurricane Sky
- 1994 - Waikikamukau
- 1993 - Redding
- 1992 - Laranto
- 1991 - Triscay
- 1990 - Stylish Century
- 1989 - King’s High
- 1988 - Mr.Danamite
- 1987 - Myocard
- 1986 - Normandy Bay
- 1985 - Playful Monarch
- 1984 - Tri-Flow
- 1983 - Admiral Lincoln
- 1982 - Gurner's Lane
- 1981 - Find The Gold
- 1980 - Mr.Independent
- 1979 - Double Century
- 1978 - Father’s Day
- 1977 - Blue Monarch
- 1976 - Ready O’Ready
- 1975 - Classic Conquest
- 1974 - Sequester
- 1973 - Red Cast
- 1972 - Hampton’s Pride
- 1971 - Royal Guardsman
- 1970 - Voleur
- 1969 - Aventyl
- 1968 - Chosen Lady
- 1967 - Pharaon
- 1966 - Naval Brass
- 1965 - Matloch
- 1964 - Spotted
- 1963 - Soldate
- 1962 - Blue Era
- 1961 - Reinsman
- 1960 - Nilarco
- 1959 - High Peal
- 1958 - Wool Man
- 1957 - Lord Gavin

== See also ==
- List of Australian Group races
- Group races
