= Begood Toya Mother =

Australian Thoroughbred racehorse

- Sire: Myboycharlie
- Grandsire: Danetime
- Dam: Lady Of Helena
- Damsire: Kaapstad
- Sex: Gelding
- Foaled: 25 August 2014
- Died: 7 September 2022 (aged 8)
- Country: Australia
- Colour: Bay or Brown
- Breeder: M Nevin
- Owner: Hello Possum, MJ Bracken, P Van Ginneken, E Petherick, J Farrow, Ultimate Racing, LK Petherick, RP Carey, Crack Seven Racing, WB Burgoyne, Youngandold, LA Reichelt, JL Serle, MA Atchison, B Deverall, MS Fleming, In The Gravy, MB Dreams
- Trainer: Daniel Bowman
- Record: 30: 8–3–0
- Earnings: A$740,140

Major wins
- Sir Rupert Clarke Stakes (2019)

Begood Toya Mother (25 August 2014 – 7 September 2022) was a Group 1 winning Australian thoroughbred racehorse.

== Background ==
The gelding was purchased at the 2016 Adelaide Magic Millions yearling sale for A$28,000.

== Racing career ==
The horse was successful in the Group 1 2019 Sir Rupert Clarke Stakes at Caulfield Racecourse. Ridden by Irish jockey Declan Bates, he won at the odds of 2/1 by 1.25 lengths.

== Pedigree ==
Pedigree of Begood Toya Mother (AUS) 2014
Sire Myboycharlie (IRE) 2005	Danetime (IRE); 1994	Danehill	Danzig
Sire Myboycharlie (IRE) 2005	Danetime (IRE); 1994	Danehill	Razyana
Sire Myboycharlie (IRE) 2005	Danetime (IRE); 1994	Allegheny River	Lear Fan
Sire Myboycharlie (IRE) 2005	Danetime (IRE); 1994	Allegheny River	Allesheny
Sire Myboycharlie (IRE) 2005	Dulceata (IRE); 1988	Rousillon	Riverman
Sire Myboycharlie (IRE) 2005	Dulceata (IRE); 1988	Rousillon	Belle Dorine
Sire Myboycharlie (IRE) 2005	Dulceata (IRE); 1988	Snowtop	Thatching
Sire Myboycharlie (IRE) 2005	Dulceata (IRE); 1988	Snowtop	Icing
Dam Lady Of Helena (NZ) 1999	Kaapstad (NZ); 1984	Sir Tristram	Sir Ivor
Dam Lady Of Helena (NZ) 1999	Kaapstad (NZ); 1984	Sir Tristram	Isolt
Dam Lady Of Helena (NZ) 1999	Kaapstad (NZ); 1984	Eight Carat	Pieces of Eight
Dam Lady Of Helena (NZ) 1999	Kaapstad (NZ); 1984	Eight Carat	Klairessa
Dam Lady Of Helena (NZ) 1999	Lady Bronte (NZ); 1983	Little Brown Jug	Godavari
Dam Lady Of Helena (NZ) 1999	Lady Bronte (NZ); 1983	Little Brown Jug	Pease
Dam Lady Of Helena (NZ) 1999	Lady Bronte (NZ); 1983	Luciana	Copenhagen
Dam Lady Of Helena (NZ) 1999	Lady Bronte (NZ); 1983	Luciana	Second String
