= Elvstroem =

Australian-bred Thoroughbred racehorse (2000–2024)

- Sire: Danehill
- Grandsire: Danzig
- Dam: Circles of Gold
- Damsire: Marscay
- Sex: Colt
- Foaled: 14 November 2000
- Died: 15 November 2024 (aged 24); France
- Country: Australia
- Colour: Bay
- Breeder: F. B. J Tagg, F. Meduri & G. Moffitt
- Owner: Arch of Gold P/L Syndicate
- Trainer: Tony Vasil
- Jockey: Nash Rawiller
- Record: 32: 10-4-5
- Earnings: A$5,722,274

Major wins
- Victoria Derby (2003); Caulfield Cup (2004); Underwood Stakes (2004); C F Orr Stakes (2005); St George Stakes (2005); Dubai Duty Free Stakes (2005)
- Last updated on 19 January 2008

Elvstroem (14 November 2000 – 15 November 2024) was a bay Thoroughbred racehorse, by world champion sire Danehill from the former champion three-year-old filly, Circles of Gold.

== Dam ==
Circles of Gold was a 1991 chestnut mare by the Australasian Champion Sire and Broodmare sire Marscay. She was bred at Widden Stud, where her sire used to stand. Circles of Gold was purchased by McDonald's Licensees - Frank Tagg, Frank Meduri and Gary Moffitt at the sales and raced in their famous gold/white and red colours.

Circles of Gold faced the starter on 43 occasions, winning 6 and placing in a further 13 races. Her most notable victory was the 1995 AJC Oaks, she also placed in the Group 1 Caulfield Cup of 1996 to the now deceased filly Arctic Scent, a race her son would capture in 2004. She was a winner of over $900,000 in stakes.

Her other progeny include Gold Rush, Lady Circles, Hveger, and Haradasun, winner of the 2007 Group 1 George Ryder Stakes, the Group 1 Doncaster Handicap and the Group 1 Queen Anne Stakes at Royal Ascot. Circles of Gold died at Segenhoe Stud aged 25 on 9 November 2016.

== At the sales ==
Elvstroem sold for A$300,000.00 at the Inglis Sales of 2002 to leading South Coast trainer Bede Murray (most notable horses include Universal Prince and Victory Vein), however the sale fell through and he was returned to his breeders, McDonald's Licensees Frank Tagg, Frank Meduri and Gary Moffitt. Little did they realise that their Danehill colt would become one of Australia's best racehorses post 2000.

== Racing career ==
Elvstroem was trained by Tony Vasil at Caulfield. He raced 32 times, winning 10 races and placing on 9 other occasions. His most notable victory came in the 2004 Caulfield Cup where he beat the champion racemare Makybe Diva by a nose. Although he didn't win, his 4th in the Melbourne Cup on a track rated heavy is considered one of his best, due to him not being considered a chance of running. His other major wins came in the Group 1 VRC Derby of 2003, Group 1 MRC Underwood Stakes, Group 1 MRC C F Orr Stakes in 2005 and Group 1 Dubai Duty Free Stakes at Nad Al Sheba Racecourse in Dubai, held in 2005.

Elvstroem ended his racing career after competing in four Group 1 events in Europe. Whilst failing to secure victory, he ran admirably, finishing 2nd behind Valixir in the Prix D'ispahan, 3rd to Azamour in the Prince of Wales Stakes, and 4th in both the Lockinge Stakes and Grand Prix Saint de Cloud.

He won $5,722,274 in stakes, and won from distances of 1300 metres (6½ furlongs) up to 2,500 metres (12½ furlongs). In races in which both he and Makybe Diva participated, he finished ahead of her the majority of the time.

== Death ==
Elvstroem died in France on 15 November 2024, one day after his 24th birthday.

== Race record ==
2002–03 season as a two-year-old
Result	Date	Race	Venue	Group	Distance	Weight (kg)	Jockey	Winner/2nd
Won	7 June 2003	2yo Hcp Restricted	Swan Hill	NA	1300 m	57	E. Cassar	2nd - Deep in the Woods

2003–04 season as a three-year-old
Result	Date	Race	Venue	Group	Distance	Weight (kg)	Jockey	Winner/2nd
6th	30 August 2003	HDF McNeil Stakes	Caulfield	G3	1100 m	54	P. Mertens	1st - Cahuita
2nd	10 September 2003	3yo Hcp Restricted	Bendigo	NA	1300 m	56.5	B. Prebble	1st - Flash in the Pan
Won	21 September 2003	Guineas Prelude	Caulfield	G3	1400 m	54	B. Prebble	2nd - In Top Swing
5th	11 October 2003	Caulfield Guineas	Caulfield	G1	1600 m	55.5	B. Prebble	1st - In Top Swing
2nd	25 October 2003	AAMI Vase	Moonee Valley	G2	2040 m	55.5	P. Payne	1st - Kempinsky
Won	1 November 2003	Victoria Derby	Flemington	G1	2500 m	55.5	D. Oliver	2nd - Kempinsky
5th	17 January 2004	Zeditave Stakes	Caulfield	LR	1200 m	58	P. Payne	1st - St Elmo's Fire
3rd	31 January 2004	Debonair Stakes	Flemington	G3	1410 m	57.5	D. Oliver	1st - Starcraft
5th	14 February 2004	Australian Guineas	Flemington	G1	1600 m	55.5	D. Oliver	1st - Reset
Won	28 February 2004	Autumn Classic	Caulfield	G2	1800 m	55.5	D. Oliver	2nd - Delzao
3rd	8 March 2004	Australian Cup	Flemington	G1	2000 m	53.5	D. Oliver	1st - Lonhro
3rd	27 March 2004	Rosehill Guineas	Rosehill	G1	2000 m	56.5	D. Oliver	1st - Neillo
6th	3 April 2004	The BMW Stakes	Rosehill	G1	2400 m	53.5	D. Oliver	1st - Grand Zulu
5th	10 April 2004	Australian Derby	Randwick	G1	2400 m	56.5	P. Payne	1st - Starcraft

2004–05 season as a four-year-old
Result	Date	Race	Venue	Group	Distance	Weight (kg)	Jockey	Winner/2nd
3rd	7 August 2004	Bletchingly Stakes	Caulfield	G3	1200 m	57.5	N. Rawiller	1st - Le Zagaletta
5th	21 August 2004	J J Liston Stakes	Caulfield	G2	1400 m	57.5	N. Rawiller	1st - Regal Roller
2nd	4 September 2004	Craiglee Stakes	Flemington	G2	1600 m	57.5	N. Rawiller	1st - Hugs Dancer
Won	19 September 2004	Underwood Stakes	Caulfield	G1	1800 m	57	N. Rawiller	2nd - She's Archie
Won	2 October 2004	Turnbull Stakes	Flemington	G2	2000 m	57.5	N. Rawiller	2nd - Mummify
Won	16 October 2004	Caulfield Cup	Caulfield	G1	2400 m	54	N. Rawiller	2nd - Makybe Diva
8th	23 October 2004	Cox Plate	Moonee Valley	G1	2040 m	56.5	N. Rawiller	1st - Savabeel
4th	2 November 2004	Melbourne Cup	Flemington	G1	3200 m	56.5	N. Rawiller	1st - Makybe Diva
Won	12 February 2005	C F Orr Stakes	Caulfield	G1	1400 m	58	N. Rawiller	2nd - Savabeel
Won	26 February 2005	St George Stakes	Caulfield	G2	1800 m	58	N. Rawiller	2nd - Makybe Diva
4th	12 March 2005	Australian Cup	Flemington	G1	2000 m	58	N. Rawiller	1st - Makybe Diva
Won	26 March 2005	Dubai Duty Free Stakes	Dubai	G1	1800 m	57	N. Rawiller	2nd - Whilly
9th	24 April 2005	Queen Elizabeth II Cup	Sha Tin	G1	2000 m	57	N. Rawiller	1st - Vengeance of Rain
4th	14 May 2005	Lockinge Stakes	Newbury	G1	1600 m	57	N. Rawiller	1st - Rakti
2nd	22 May 2005	Prix d'Ispahan	Longchamp	G1	1800 m	58	N. Rawiller	1st - Valixir
3rd	15 June 2005	Prince of Wales's Stakes	York	G1	2100 m	57	N. Rawiller	1st - Azamour
4th	26 June 2005	Grand Prix de Saint-Cloud	Saint-Cloud	G1	2400	58	N. Rawiller	1st - Alkaased

== At stud ==
In 2005, Elvstroem retired to stud at Victoria's famed Blue Gum Stud Farm. The stud had been looking for a replacement after losing Encosta De Lago to Coolmore Stud the previous season. Blue Gum Stud has stood the stallions, Rubiton (now deceased), Noalcoholic, Rancho Ruler and the consistent sire Umatilla.

In 2005 Elvstroem covered 166 mares, at A$38,500.00 per mare. His bookings included stakes producing mare Add Tinsel (dam of Caulfield Cup placegetter/stakes winner Celestial Show & Fashion Victim), stakes winner British Lion, Group 2 winner Climb The Vine, stakes producing mare Dangerous Seam (dam of Real Jester & Seidnazar), stakes producing mare Gabbing Glora (dam of Caulfield Cup Australasian record holder Diatribe), stakes producing mare Lottey (dam of Gold Lottey), Group 3 winner Sunny Lane, Group 2 winner Tickle My, etc.

He is the sire of Carrara, winner of the 2009 BTC Doomben Slipper.

In 2016 he joined the Haras du Petit Tellier thoroughbred breeding farm in Sévigny, Orne, France.

== Pedigree ==
Pedigree of Elvstroem (Aus)
Sire Danehill (USA) 1986	Danzig (USA); 1977	Northern Dancer (Can); 1961	Nearctic (Can)
Sire Danehill (USA) 1986	Danzig (USA); 1977	Northern Dancer (Can); 1961	Natalma (USA)
Sire Danehill (USA) 1986	Danzig (USA); 1977	Pas de Nom (USA); 1968	Admiral's Voyage (USA)
Sire Danehill (USA) 1986	Danzig (USA); 1977	Pas de Nom (USA); 1968	Petitioner (GB)
Sire Danehill (USA) 1986	Razyana (USA); 1981	His Majesty (USA); 1968	Ribot (GB)
Sire Danehill (USA) 1986	Razyana (USA); 1981	His Majesty (USA); 1968	Flower Bowl (USA)
Sire Danehill (USA) 1986	Razyana (USA); 1981	Spring Adieu (Can); 1974	Buckpasser (USA)
Sire Danehill (USA) 1986	Razyana (USA); 1981	Spring Adieu (Can); 1974	Natalma (USA)
Dam Circles of Gold (Aus) 1991	Marscay (Aus); 1979	Biscay (Aus); 1965	Star Kingdom (Ire)
Dam Circles of Gold (Aus) 1991	Marscay (Aus); 1979	Biscay (Aus); 1965	Magic Symbol (Aus)
Dam Circles of Gold (Aus) 1991	Marscay (Aus); 1979	Heart of Market (USA); 1967	To Market (USA)
Dam Circles of Gold (Aus) 1991	Marscay (Aus); 1979	Heart of Market (USA); 1967	Accroche Coeur (USA)
Dam Circles of Gold (Aus) 1991	Olympic Aim (NZ); 1983	Zamazaan (Fr); 1965	Exbury (Fr)
Dam Circles of Gold (Aus) 1991	Olympic Aim (NZ); 1983	Zamazaan (Fr); 1965	Toyama (Ire)
Dam Circles of Gold (Aus) 1991	Olympic Aim (NZ); 1983	Gold Vink (NZ); 1966	Gold Sovereign (GB)
Dam Circles of Gold (Aus) 1991	Olympic Aim (NZ); 1983	Gold Vink (NZ); 1966	Goudvink (NZ)
