= Geoffrey Bellmaine Stakes =

- Class: Group 3
- Location: Caulfield Racecourse
- Inaugurated: 2001 (Listed race)
- Race type: Thoroughbred
- Sponsor: Lamaro's (2021-26)

Race information
- Distance: 1,200 metres
- Surface: Turf
- Track: Left-handed
- Qualification: Mares four years old and older
- Weight: set weights with penalties
- Purse: $200,000 (2026)

The Geoffrey Bellmaine Stakes is a Melbourne Racing Club Group 3 Thoroughbred horse race for mares four years old and older, held with Set Weights with penalties conditions, over a distance of 1200 metres at Caulfield Racecourse in Melbourne, Australia in February.

== History ==
The race has been held on the same race card as the Group 1 C F Orr Stakes since 2003.

=== Name ===
- 2000 - Hyderabad Race Club Plate
- 2001 - Hyderabad Race Club Stakes
- 2002 - Hyderabad Race Club Handicap
- 2003 - Moduline Plate
- 2004–2011 - Hyderabad Race Club Stakes
- 2012–2015 - Geoffrey Bellmaine Stakes
- 2016 - Bellmaine Stakes

=== Distance ===
- 2000–2001 - 1200 metres
- 2002 - 1600 metres
- 2003 onwards - 1200 metres

=== Grade ===
- 2001–2006 - Listed race
- 2007 onwards - Group 3

== Winners ==
The following are past winners of the Geoffrey Bellmaine Stakes:

- 2026 - Wrote To Arataki
- 2025 - She's Bulletproof
- 2024 - Vagrant
- 2023 - Wrote To Arataki
- 2022 - Probabeel
- 2021 - Probabeel
- 2020 - Sylvia's Mother
- 2019 - Princess Of Queens
- 2018 - Prussian Vixen
- 2017 - Prussian Vixen
- 2016 - Tuscan Sling
- 2015 - Tycoon Tara
- 2014 - A Time For Julia
- 2013 - There's Only One
- 2012 - Psychologist
- 2011 - Beaded
- 2010 - Velocitea
- 2009 - Annesong
- 2008 - Lucky Diva
- 2007 - Coniston Gem
- 2006 - Beautiful Gem
- 2005 - Glamour Puss
- 2004 - Given
- 2003 - Skewiff
- 2002 - Blue Marwina
- 2001 - Typhoon Billie
- 2000 - Londolozi

== See also ==
- Chairman's Stakes (MRC)
- List of Australian Group races
- Group races
