= Champs Elysees (horse) =

British-bred Thoroughbred racehorse

- Sire: Danehill
- Grandsire: Danzig
- Dam: Hasili
- Damsire: Kahyasi
- Sex: Stallion
- Foaled: 21 March 2003
- Died: 19 December 2018 (aged 15)
- Country: Great Britain
- Colour: Bay
- Breeder: Juddmonte Farms
- Owner: Khalid Abdullah
- Trainer: 1) André Fabre (France); 2) Robert J. Frankel (USA)
- Record: 29:6-9-7
- Earnings: US$2,931,818

Major wins
- Prix d'Hédouville (2007); Hollywood Turf Cup Stakes (2008); Northern Dancer Turf Stakes (2008); San Marcos Stakes (2008); Canadian International Stakes (2009)

Awards
- Canadian Horse of the Year (2009); Sovereign Award for Champion Male Turf Horse (2009)

Champs Elysees (21 March 2003 – 19 December 2018) was a Thoroughbred racehorse who has competed successfully in Europe and North America.

== Racing career ==
Raced at age three from a base in France, Champs-Elysees had his best results in Conditions races with a second in the Prix Daphnis and the Prix du Prince d'Orange. At age four, he won the 2007 Prix d'Hédouville at Longchamp Racecourse in Paris and late in the year was sent to race in North America. He won important stakes races in 2008 including the Grade 1 Hollywood Turf Cup Stakes, and capped off his career with his most important win ever in the October 17, 2009 Canadian International Stakes at Woodbine Racetrack in Toronto.

== Stud career ==
Retired from racing, Champs Elysees began standing at stud during the 2010 season at Juddmonte Farms in Cambridgeshire, England In Nov 2016 purchased by Coolmore - At stud at Castlehyde Stud, Ireland, He died of a heart attack on 19 December 2018.

Among his first crop of foals was the Ascot Gold Cup winner Trip To Paris and the 2018 & 2019 Australian Cup winner Harlem. He also sired the 1000 Guineas and Sun Chariot Stakes winner Billesdon Brook.

=== Notable progeny ===
c = colt, f = filly, g = gelding

Foaled	Name	Dam (Dam Sire)	Sex	Major Wins
2011	Trip To Paris	La Grande Zoa (Fantastic Light)	g	Ascot Gold Cup
2012	Harlem	Casual (Nayef)	g	Australian Cup (twice)
2013	Way To Paris	Grey Way (Cozzene)	c	Grand Prix de Saint-Cloud
2015	Billesdon Brook	Coplow (Manduro)	f	1,000 Guineas; Sun Chariot Stakes
2016	Selino	Air Kiss (Red Ransom)	g	Sydney Cup
