= Eurythmic Stakes =

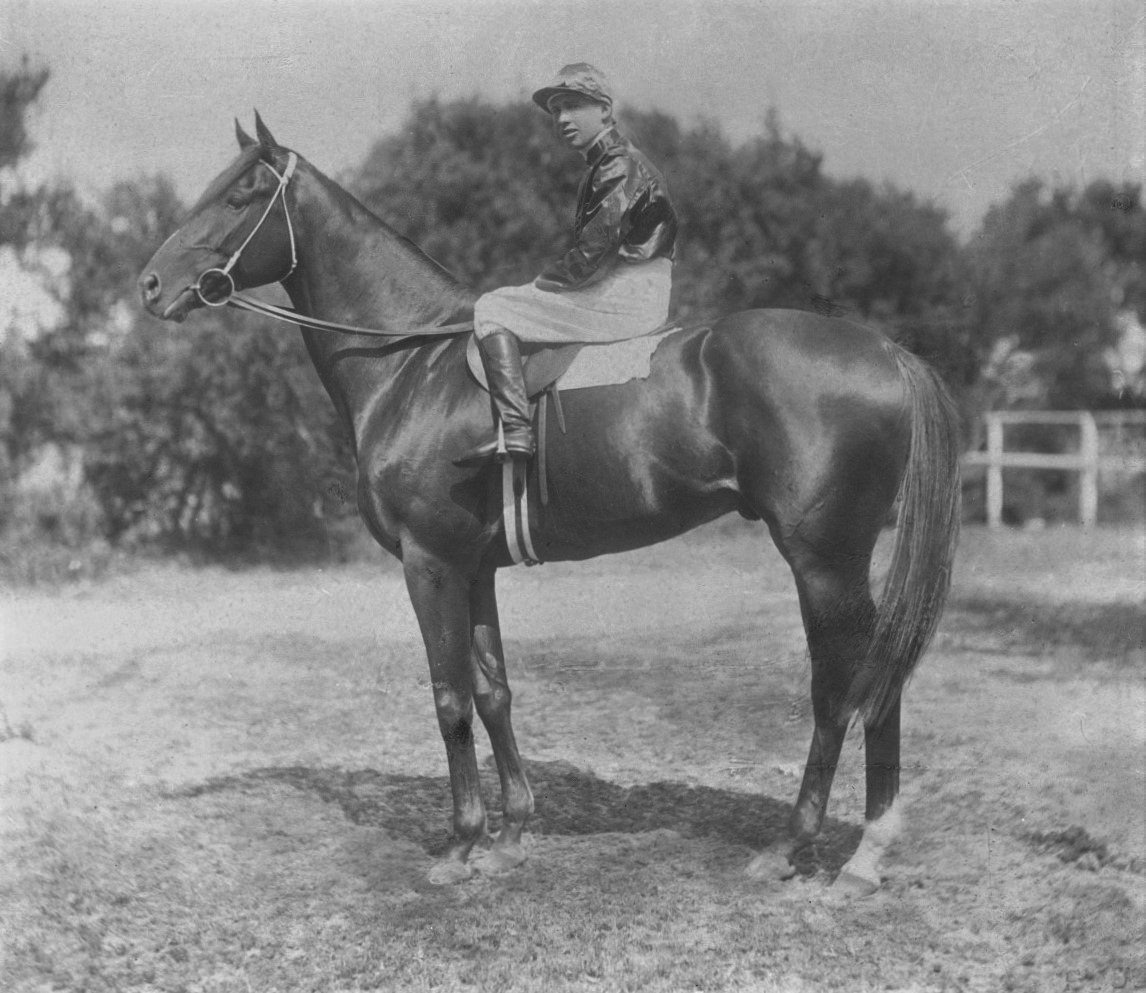
- Eurythmic and Frank Dempsey
- Class: Group 3
- Location: Ascot Racecourse, Perth, Western Australia
- Inaugurated: 1978 (as Anniversary Cup)
- Race type: Thoroughbred
- Sponsor: SENTurf (2026)

Race information
- Distance: 1,400 metres
- Surface: Turf
- Track: Left-handed
- Qualification: 3 years old and older
- Weight: WFA (Weight For Age)
- Purse: A$200,000 (2026)

The Eurythmic Stakes, formerly known as the Northerly Stakes, is a Perth Racing Group 3 Thoroughbred handicap horse race for horses aged three years old and upwards, over a distance of 1400 metres at Ascot Racecourse, Perth, Western Australia in October.

== History ==
The race was renamed in 2010 after the champion Western Australian thoroughbred Northerly, winner of two W S Cox Plates (2001 & 2002), two Australian Cups (2001 & 2003) and a Caulfield Cup (2002).

In 2022, this Group 3 level Northerly Stakes was renamed the Eurythmic Stakes, while the Group 1 Kingston Town Classic was renamed the Northerly Stakes.

=== Name ===
- 1978–2005 - Anniversary Cup
- 2006–2022 - Northerly Stakes
- 2022 - Eurythmic Stakes

=== Grade ===
- Prior to 2013 - Listed Race
- 2013 - Group 3

=== Distance ===
- 1978 – 2200 metres
- 1979–1983 – 2400 metres
- 1984–1999 – 1800 metres
- 2000 – 1600 metres
- 2001–2014 – 1400 metres
- 2015 – 1420 metres

=== Venue ===
- 2003 - Northam Racecourse
- 2005 - Belmont Park Racecourse

== Winners ==
The following are past winners of the race.

- 2026 - King Of Light
- 2025 - Diamond Scene
- 2024 - Comfort Me
- 2023 - Karli's Karma
- 2022 - Resortman
- 2021 - Dance Music
- 2020 - Taxagano
- 2019 - The Velvet King
- 2018 - Man Booker
- 2017 - Silverstream
- 2016 - Lite'n In My Veins
- 2015 - †Black Heart Bart
- 2014 - Fuchsia Bandana
- 2013 - Playing God
- 2012 - King Saul
- 2011 - Ranger
- 2010 - Famous Roman
- 2009 - Megatic
- 2008 - Megatic
- 2007 - New Spice
- 2006 - Grasspatch Girl
- 2005 - Changing Lanes
- 2004 - Prince Of Vasac
- 2003 - Superior Star
- 2002 - Mr. Callahan
- 2001 - Storm Shot
- 2000 - Umah
- 1999 - Dynaliebe
- 1998 - Paddy Me Lad
- 1997 - Summer Beau
- 1996 - Classy Dresser
- 1995 - Vagabond Boy
- 1994 - Zamaloid
- 1993 - King Diamond
- 1992 - Red Javelin
- 1991 - Vale Of Avoca
- 1990 - Proud Treaty
- 1989 - Pagonic
- 1988 - Eastern Flight
- 1987 - Leica Soldier
- 1986 - Track Jester
- 1985 - Restoration
- 1984 - Mr. Efficient
- 1983 - Rosamoss
- 1982 - Mnitorma
- 1981 - Little Imagele
- 1980 - Gay Affair
- 1979 - Regimental Honour
- 1978 - Meliador

† Originally the race was scheduled on 18 October 2015 but the race meeting was abandoned after the fourth race due to track safety. Race was held 21 October 2015.

== See also ==
- List of Australian Group races
- Group races
