= Naturalism Stakes =

Annual horse race in Melbourne, Australia

MRC Foundation Cup registered as Naturalism Stakes
- Class: Group 3
- Location: Caulfield Racecourse, Melbourne, Australia
- Inaugurated: 1983 (Principal race as VATC Royal Show Handicap)
- Race type: Thoroughbred
- Sponsor: Tobin Brothers (2025 & 2026)

Race information
- Distance: 2,000 metres
- Surface: Turf
- Weight: Open handicap
- Purse: $200,000 (2026)
- Bonuses: Winner ballot exemption Caulfield Cup

The MRC Foundation Cup, registered as the Naturalism Stakes, is a Melbourne Racing Club Group 3 Thoroughbred open handicap horse race, over a distance of 2,000 metres. It is held annually at Caulfield Racecourse, Melbourne, Australia in September.

== History ==
The registered race is named after Naturalism, who won the 1993 Caulfield Stakes. The Naturalism Stakes is a good guide to high-profile races later in the season, including the Caulfield Cup and the prestigious W S Cox Plate.

Since 2007 the race winner obtains a ballot exemption from the Caulfield Cup.

=== Grade ===
- The race was upgraded from a Listed race to Group 3 in 2009.

=== Distance ===
- 1983–1993 – 1800 metres
- 1994 onwards - 2000 metres

=== Name ===
- 1983–1994 - VATC Royal Show Handicap
- 1995–2001 - Naturalism Stakes
- 2002 - Emirates Airlines Stakes
- 2003 - Carnival Stakes
- 2004 - Dubai Duty Free Stakes
- 2005 - Nad Al Sheba Club Classic
- 2006–2014 - Naturalism Stakes
- 2015 - MRC Foundation Cup

== Winners ==
The following are past winners of the race.

- 2026 - Zahrann
- 2025 - Half Yours
- 2024 - Positivity
- 2023 - Uncle Bryn
- 2022 - Smokin' Romans
- 2021 - Nonconformist
- 2020 - Orderofthegarter
- 2019 - Brimham Rocks
- 2018 - Night's Watch
- 2017 - Harlem
- 2016 - Jameka
- 2015 - Magnapal
- 2014 - Gris Caro
- 2013 - Mr O'Ceirin
- 2012 - Folding Gear
- 2011 - December Draw
- 2010 - Rainbow Styling
- 2009 - Red Lord
- 2008 - Zagreb
- 2007 - Douro Valley
- 2006 - Zipping
- 2005 - Sarrera
- 2004 - Confectioner
- 2003 - Rose Archway
- 2002 - Pentastic
- 2001 - Inaflury
- 2000 - Celestial Show
- 1999 - Second Coming
- 1998 - Our Unicorn
- 1997 - Skybeau
- 1996 - Peep On The Sly
- 1995 - Campaign Warrior
- 1994 - Top Rating
- 1993 - Golden Serpent
- 1992 - Three Pals
- 1991 - Newbury Star
- 1990 - Just A Dancer
- 1989 - Tiendi
- 1988 - Ebeli Show
- 1987 - Tristram
- 1986 - Sea Legend
- 1985 - Top Banner
- 1984 - Mapperley Heights
- 1983 - Mevron Boy

== See also ==
- Caulfield Guineas Prelude
- How Now Stakes
- Sir Rupert Clarke Stakes
- Thousand Guineas Prelude
- Underwood Stakes
- List of Australian Group races
- Group races
