= Young Idea =

Australian thoroughbred horse

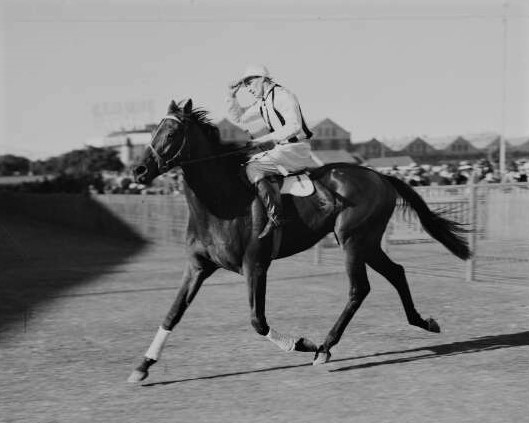
- Young Idea & Jack Pratt; Randwick Racecourse
- Sire: Constant Son (GB)
- Grandsire: Son-in-Law (GB)
- Dam: Persuasion (AUS)
- Damsire: The Welkin (GB)
- Sex: Stallion
- Foaled: 1932
- Country: Australia
- Colour: Brown
- Breeder: Kia Ora Stud
- Owner: A.G.Hunter & Percy Miller; Percy Miller from 15.8.1936
- Trainer: Fred Foulsham; Jack Holt from 15.8.1936
- Record: 70: 15, 11, 13
- Earnings: £18,555

Major wins
- Sires Produce Stakes (1935); Champagne Stakes (1935); Sires' Produce Stakes (1935); Sir Herbert Maitland Stakes (1935); Caulfield Guineas (1935); Underwood Stakes (1935, 1937); Caulfield Stakes (1936); Linlithgow Stakes (1936); Cox Plate (1936, 1937); St George Stakes (1937); Craven Plate (1938)

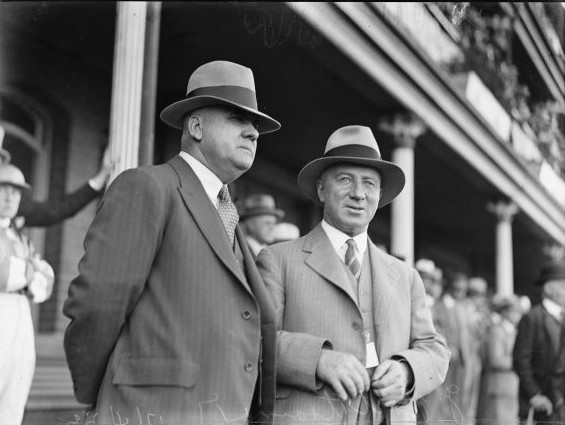
Percy Miller & Jack Holt Randwick 1933

Young Idea (foaled 1932) was a brown Australian thoroughbred stallion who raced for five seasons from a two-year-old to a six-year-old, recording major wins in Sydney and Melbourne from 6 furlongs to 1¼ miles.

== Breeding ==
Young Idea was bred by Percy Miller Kia Ora Stud Scone and was sold for 500 guineas to owner A.G. Hunter. Percy Miller later purchased a half share after the sale and in 1936 purchased A.G.Hunter's half share holding when transferred to trainer Jack Holt and retired to Kia Ora Stud in 1939.

Sire Constant Son (GB) sire of 10 stakeswinners began stud duty in Australia in 1930 as a two-year-old won the Arlington Stakes at Newmarket and later the Derby Gold Cup 1¾ miles. Grandsire Son-in-Law was the leading sire in the United Kingdom in 1924 and 1930. Major wins being the 1914–15 Jockey Club Cup and 1914 Goodwood Cup.

Dam Persuasion (AUS) won the 1927 Adrian Knox Stakes at Randwick Racecourse. Damsire The Welkin (GB) the leading sire in Australia 1918–19 and 1920–22 and sire of the New Zealand champion Gloaming.

== Racing career ==
Young Idea raced between 1934 and 1939 the winner of 8 Group 1 races in the modern era and a dual 1936–37 Cox Plate winner also the 1935 WFA Sir Herbert Maitland Stakes at Victoria Park, Zetland and second behind the champion Peter Pan in the 1935 Hill Stakes.

== 1938 racebook ==
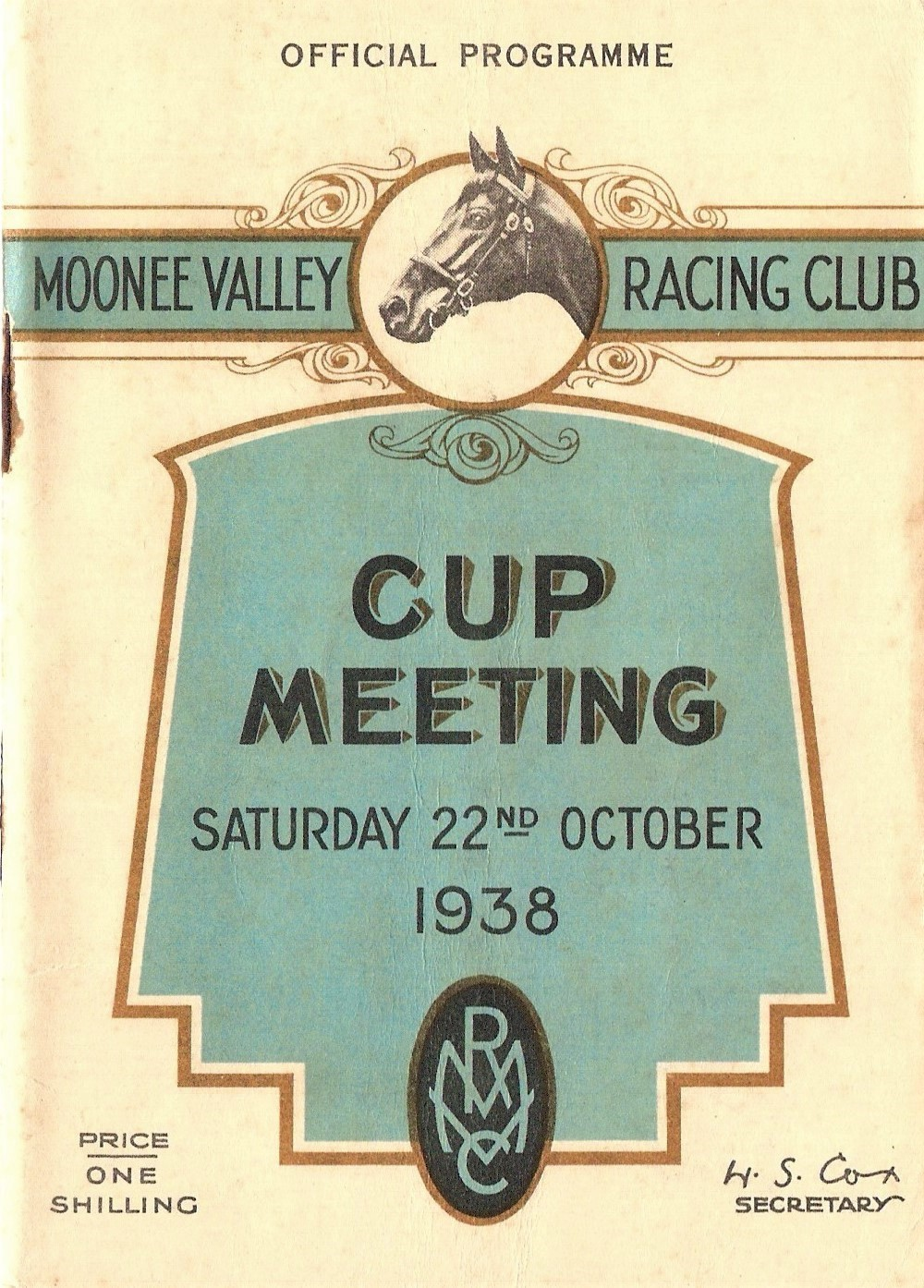
Front cover of the 1938 Cox Plate racebook

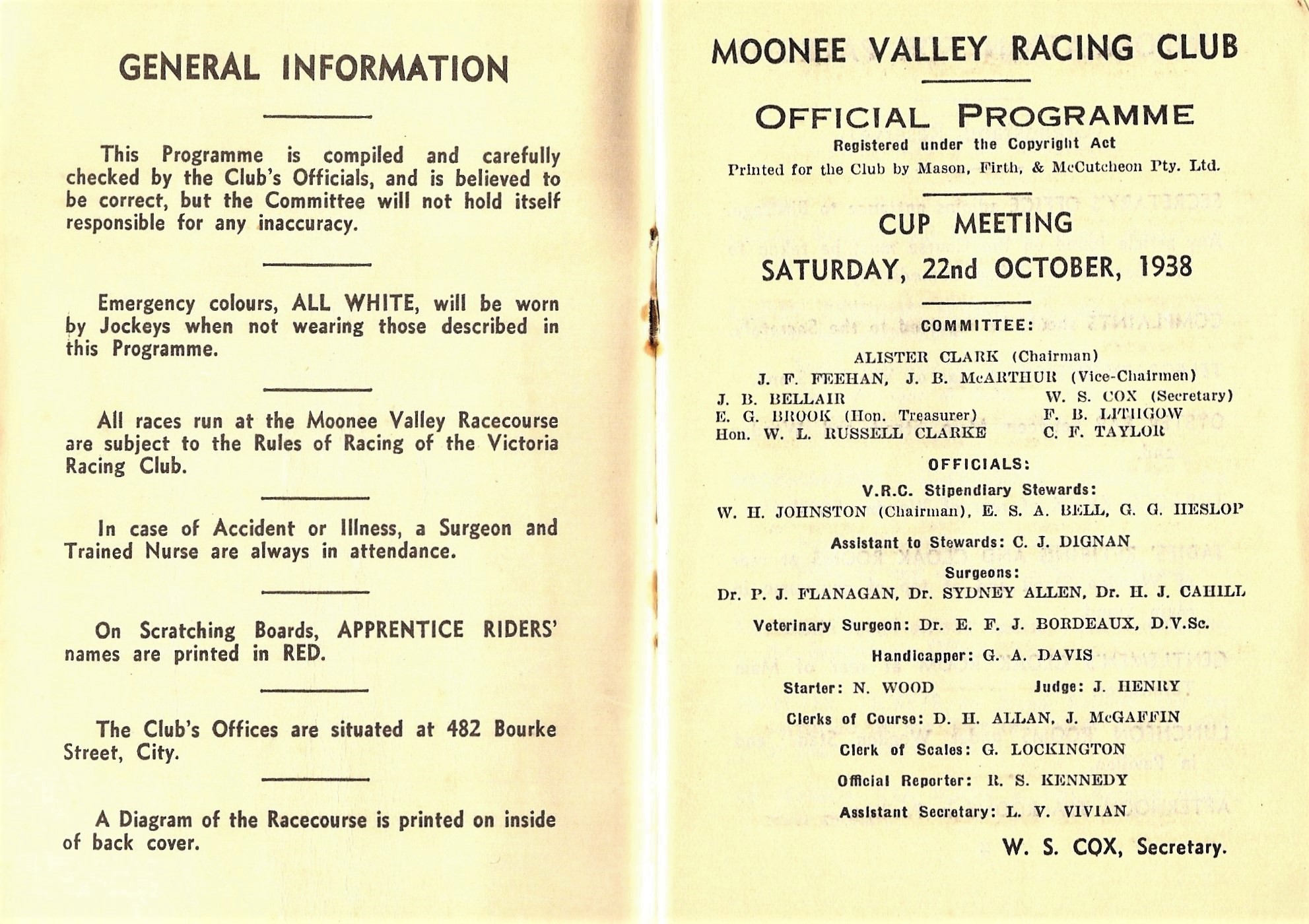
Inside cover showing raceday officials

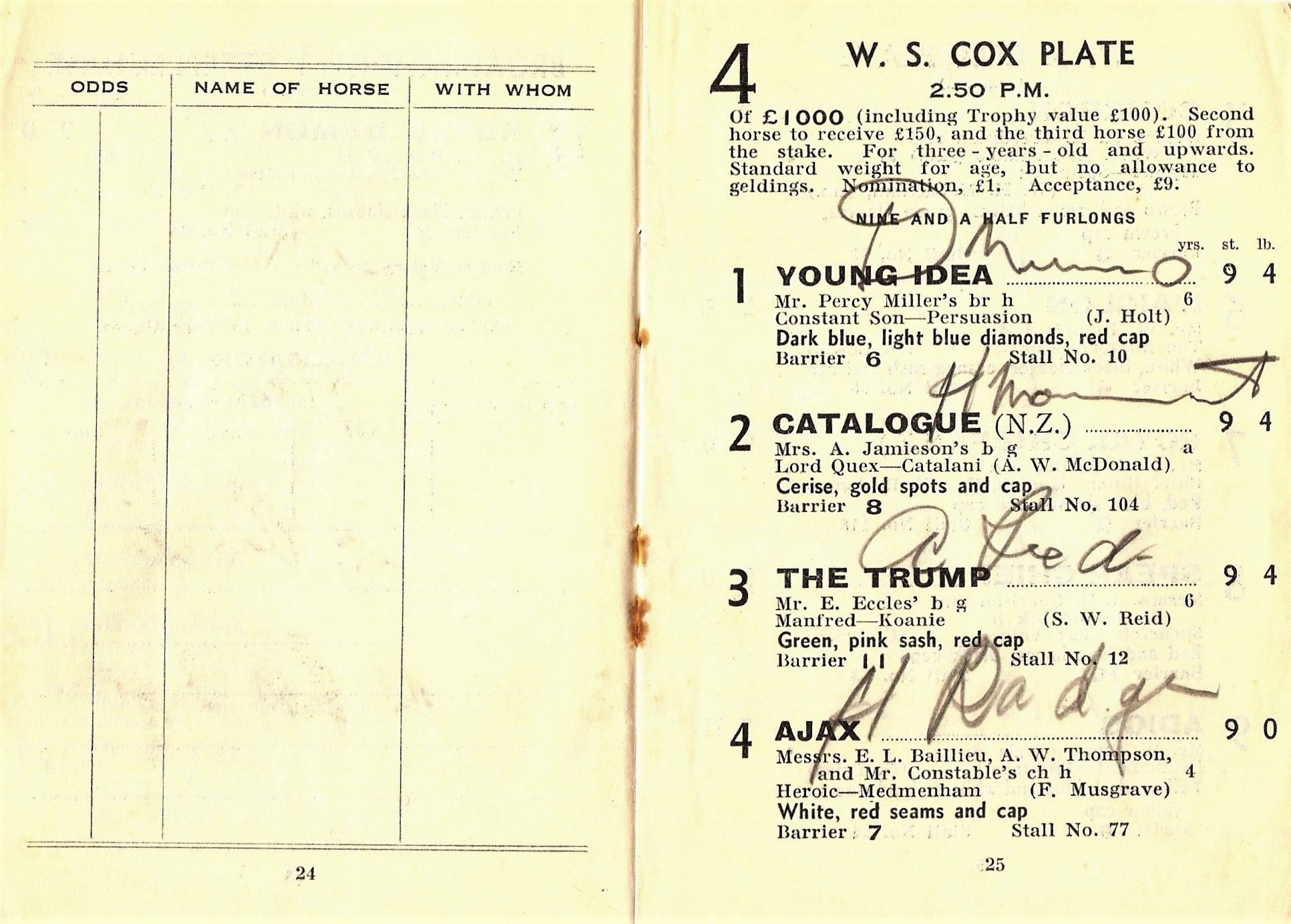
Starters and results showing 3rd placed, Young Idea

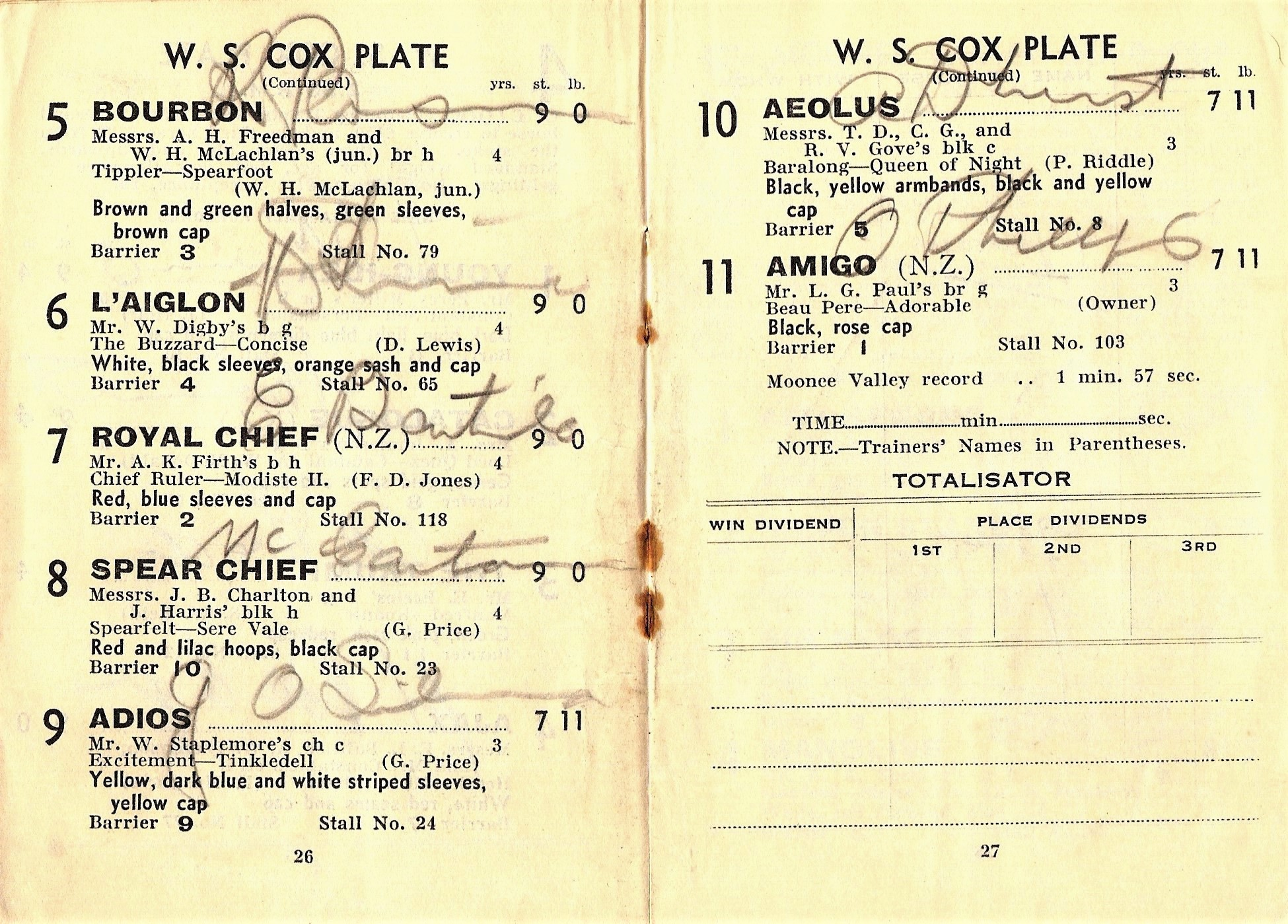
Starters and results of the 1938 Cox Plate

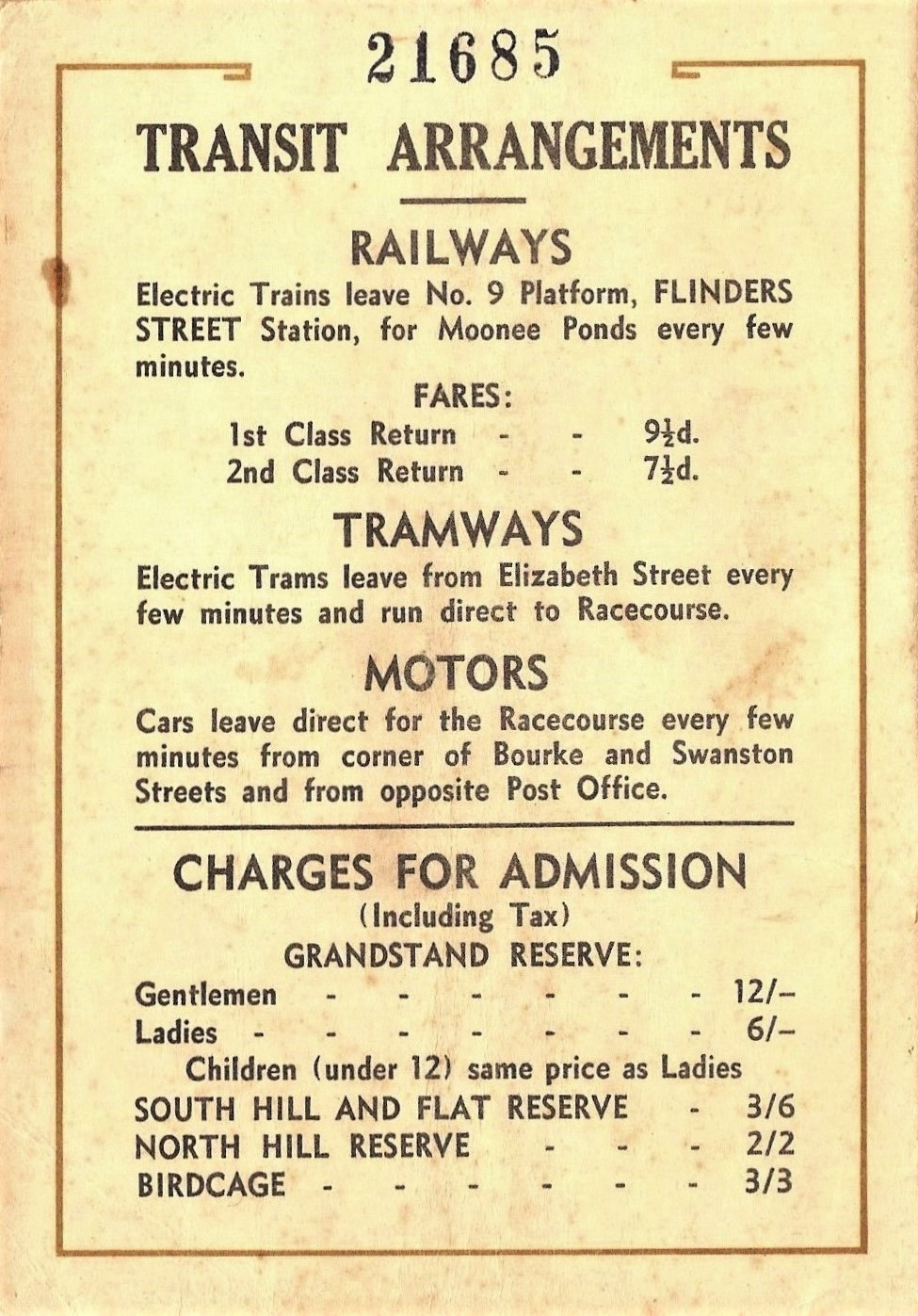
Back cover showing railway & entrance charges
