= Thousand Guineas Prelude =

Thousand Guineas Prelude registered as the Tranquil Star Stakes
- Class: Group 2
- Location: Caulfield Racecourse, Melbourne, Australia
- Inaugurated: 1983
- Race type: Thoroughbred
- Sponsor: Manhari Metals (2025 & 2026)

Race information
- Distance: 1,400 metres
- Surface: Turf
- Qualification: Three year old fillies
- Weight: Set weights with penalties
- Purse: $300,000 (2026)
- Bonuses: Winner is exempt from ballot for Caulfield Guineas and The Thousand Guineas

The Thousand Guineas Prelude, registered as the Tranquil Star Stakes, is a Melbourne Racing Club Group 2 Thoroughbred horse race, for three year old fillies, at set weights with penalties, over a distance of 1400 metres, held annually at Caulfield Racecourse, Melbourne, Australia in September. This event is a preparation race for the prestigious Group 1 The Thousand Guineas later in October at Caulfield.

== History ==
The registered name of the race is named after Australian Hall of Fame champion mare from the 1940s Tranquil Star.

The following horses have won The Thousand Guineas Prelude then gone on to win The Thousand Guineas: Bianca Flyer (1987); Azzurro (1992); Miss Finland (2006); Irish Lights (2009)

=== Name ===
- 1983–1989 - Health Stakes
- 1990–2001 - Tranquil Star Stakes
- 2002–2005 - Jumeirah International Stakes
- 2006 - Tranquil Star Stakes
- 2007–2020 - Thousand Guineas Prelude
- 2021 - TG Prelude

=== Grade ===
- 1983–1999 - Listed race
- 2000–2012 - Group 3
- 2013 onwards - Group 2

=== Distance ===
- 1983–1989 – 1600 metres
- 1990 onwards - 1400 metres

== Winners ==
The following are past winners of the race.

- 2026 - Icelady
- 2025 - Ferivia
- 2024 - Too Darn Lizzie
- 2023 - Coeur Volante
- 2022 - Boogie Dancer
- 2021 - Bon's A Pearla
- 2020 - Instant Celebrity
- 2019 - Acting
- 2018 - Smart Melody
- 2017 - Booker
- 2016 - Legless Veuve
- 2015 - Miss Gunpowder
- 2014 - Afleet Espirit
- 2013 - Gregers
- 2012 - Lady Of Harrods
- 2011 - Bliss Street
- 2010 - Divorces
- 2009 - Irish Lights
- 2008 - Ortensia
- 2007 - Gabbidon
- 2006 - Miss Finland
- 2005 - Doubting
- 2004 - Hollow Bullet
- 2003 - Hinting
- 2002 - La Bella Dame
- 2001 - Haste Ye Back
- 2000 - So Gorgeous
- 1999 - Miss Pennymoney
- 1998 - Danelagh
- 1997 - Cornwall Queen
- 1996 - Derobe
- 1995 - Rubidium
- 1994 - Majestic Dawn
- 1993 - Brompton Cross
- 1992 - Azzurro
- 1991 - Chador
- 1990 - Century Pike
- 1989 - Pleasure Bandit
- 1988 - Imposing Bloom
- 1987 - Bianco Flyer
- 1986 - Shackle
- 1985 - Jewel In The Crown
- 1984 - Christmas Hamper
- 1983 - My Marseillaise

== See also ==
- Caulfield Guineas Prelude
- How Now Stakes
- Naturalism Stakes
- Sir Rupert Clarke Stakes
- Underwood Stakes
- List of Australian Group races
- Group races
