= Harlem (horse) =

British-bred thoroughbred racehorse

- Sire: Champs Elysees
- Grandsire: Danehill
- Dam: Casual
- Damsire: Nayef
- Sex: Gelding
- Foaled: 16 February 2012
- Country: Great Britain
- Colour: Bay
- Breeder: Juddmonte Farms
- Owner: DA Hayes, MB Lee, Blacktype Racing, AJ Haberfield, WB Keighran, DJ Livingston, V McDonald, MR White, CJ Atkins, J Grose, RJ Row, MW Ng
- Trainer: André Fabre (2015-2016); David & B Hayes, T Dabernig (2017 onwards)
- Record: 50: 5–3–3
- Earnings: A$2,742,602

Major wins
- Naturalism Stakes (2017); Australian Cup (2018, 2019)

Harlem (foaled 16 February 2012) is a multiple Group 1 winning British bred thoroughbred racehorse.

== Racing career ==
Originally trained by French trainer André Fabre, Harlem won the Listed Prix Frederic de Lagrange and was placed two other times in Group race company.

In 2016 he was sold to international buyers for 520,000 Guineas at the Tattersalls Autumn Horses in Training Sale at Newmarket.

Harlem continued his racing career in Australia and at his fifth start in the country he won the Naturalism Stakes at odds of 15/1.

The following year Harlem was successful in the Group 1 Australian Cup, when ridden by Michael Walker at odds of 60/1.

In 2019 he won the Australian Cup again at the odds of 30/1, this time ridden by Jamie Kah. He became the first back-to-back winner of the race since Vo Rogue in 1990.
