= Caulfield Guineas Prelude =

- Class: Group 3
- Location: Caulfield Racecourse, Melbourne, Australia
- Inaugurated: 1985
- Race type: Thoroughbred
- Sponsor: Sportsbet (2025 & 2026)

Race information
- Distance: 1,400 metres
- Surface: Turf
- Qualification: Three year old colts and geldings
- Weight: Set weights and penalties
- Purse: $300,000 (2026)
- Bonuses: Winner is exempt from ballot for Caulfield Guineas

The Caulfield Guineas Prelude is a Melbourne Racing Club Group 3 Thoroughbred horse race for colts and geldings aged three years old, under set weights and penalties conditions over a distance of 1400 metres, held at Caulfield Racecourse, Melbourne, Australia in late September. This event is a preparation race for the prestigious Group 1 Caulfield Guineas later in October at Caulfield.

== History ==
Four horses have won the Caulfield Guineas Prelude and Caulfield Guineas double:

- Alfa (1996)
- Wonderful World (2006)
- Anacheeva (2010)
- Helmet (2011)

=== Name ===
- 1985–1989 - Show Day Stakes
- 1990–1997 - J D Macdonald Stakes
- 1998–1999 - Macdonald Stakes
- 2000 onwards - Caulfield Guineas Prelude

=== Grade ===
- 1985–2000 - Listed Race
- 2001 onwards - Group 3

=== Distance ===
- 1985–1990 – 1200 metres
- 1991 onwards - 1400 metres

== Winners ==
The following are past winners of the race.

- 2026 - Blind Raise
- 2025 - Estremo
- 2024 - Angel Capital
- 2023 - Steparty
- 2022 - Aft Cabin
- 2021 - Lightsaber
- 2020 - Crosshaven
- 2019 - Alligator Blood
- 2018 - Native Soldier
- 2017 - Perast
- 2016 - Sacred Elixir
- 2015 - Bon Aurum
- 2014 - Rich Enuff
- 2013 - Eclair Big Bang
- 2012 - Epaulette
- 2011 - Helmet
- 2010 - Anacheeva
- 2009 - Demerit
- 2008 - Fernandina
- 2007 - Purrealist
- 2006 - Wonderful World
- 2005 - Apache Cat
- 2004 - Tirade
- 2003 - Elvstroem
- 2002 - Great Glen
- 2001 - Pure Theatre
- 2000 - Fubu
- 1999 - Sudurka
- 1998 - Bet On A Rode
- 1997 - Umrum
- 1996 - Alfa
- 1995 - Strategic
- 1994 - Racer's Edge
- 1993 - Port Watch
- 1992 - Just Juan
- 1991 - Laranto
- 1990 - Unspoken Word
- 1989 - Sussex Star
- 1988 - Kingston Heritage
- 1987 - Noted
- 1986 - Wild Rampage
- 1985 - Brequillo

== See also ==
- How Now Stakes
- Naturalism Stakes
- Sir Rupert Clarke Stakes
- Thousand Guineas Prelude
- Underwood Stakes
- List of Australian Group races
- Group races
