= Sir John Monash Stakes =

- Class: Group 3
- Location: Caulfield Racecourse
- Inaugurated: 1994
- Race type: Thoroughbred
- Sponsor: Sportsbet (2024 - 2026)

Race information
- Distance: 1100 metres
- Surface: Turf
- Track: Left-handed
- Qualification: Maidens ineligible
- Weight: Weight for age
- Purse: A$200,000 (2026)

The Sir John Monash Stakes is a Melbourne Racing Club Group 3 Thoroughbred horse race held under weight for age conditions, over a distance of 1100 metres at Caulfield Racecourse, Melbourne, Australia in July.

== History ==
The race is named after the Australian military commander during the First World War, Sir John Monash.

=== Name ===
- 1994–1997 - Moondah Stakes
- 1998 onwards - Sir John Monash Stakes

=== Distance ===
- 1994–2004 – 1000 metres
- 2005 onwards - 1100 metres

=== Grade ===
- 1994–2013 - Listed Race
- 2014 onwards - Group 3

== Winners ==
The following are past winners of the race.

- 2026 - Winnasedge
- 2025 - In Flight
- 2024 - Recommendation
- 2023 - Sigh
- 2022 - Mileva
- 2021 - Red Can Man
- 2020 - Jungle Edge
- 2019 - Oak Door
- 2018 - Voodoo Lad
- 2017 - Supido
- 2016 - Wild Rain
- 2015 - Miss Promiscuity
- 2014 - Lord of the Sky
- 2013 - Pago Rock
- 2012 - Platelet
- 2011 - Secret Flyer
- 2010 - Reward For Effort
- 2009 - I Am Invincible
- 2008 - Tesbury Jack
- 2007 - Lucky Secret
- 2006 - Sassbee
- 2005 - Super Elegant
- 2004 - Super Elegant
- 2003 - Dantana
- 2002 - Rubitano
- 2001 - Regal Shot
- 2000 - Honour The Name
- 1999 - Flavour
- 1998 - Jugulator
- 1997 - Red Hope
- 1996 - Delsole
- 1995 - Royal Rubiton
- 1994 - Sequalo

== See also ==
- Sir Rupert Clarke Stakes
- List of Australian Group races
- Group races
