= Sir Rupert Clarke Stakes =

Horse race held in Melbourne, Victoria, Australia

Sir Rupert Clarke Stakes registered as Invitation Stakes
- Class: Group 1
- Location: Caulfield Racecourse, Melbourne, Australia
- Inaugurated: 1951
- Race type: Thoroughbred
- Sponsor: Sportsbet (2024-2026)

Race information
- Distance: 1,400 metres
- Surface: Turf
- Qualification: Three year old and older
- Weight: Open handicap
- Purse: $1,000,000 (2026)

The Sir Rupert Clarke Stakes, registered as the Invitation Stakes, is a Melbourne Racing Club Group 1 Thoroughbred open handicap horse race, run over a distance of 1400 metres at Caulfield Racecourse, Melbourne, Australia in late September.

== History ==
Prior to 1994, the race was held on Royal Melbourne Show Day, which was observed on the Thursday in the last full week of September as a public holiday. The race was renamed in 2005 after former chairman of the Victorian Amateur Turf Club, Sir Rupert Clarke, who died in 2005.

=== Name ===
- 1951–1974 - Invitation Stakes
- 1975–1988 - Marlboro Cup
- 1989–1991 - Show Day Cup
- 1992–1999 - Vic Health Cup
- 2000–2001 - Eat Well Live Well Cup
- 2002–2005 - Dubai Racing Club Cup
- 2006–2013 - Sir Rupert Clarke Stakes
- 2014 - Sir Rupert Clarke Charity Cup
- 2015 onwards - Sir Rupert Clarke Stakes

=== Grade ===
- 1951–1978 - Principal Race
- 1979 onwards Group 1

=== Distance ===
- 1951–1971 - 7 furlongs (~1400 metres)
- 1974 onwards - 1400 metres

== Winners ==
The following are past winners of the race.

- 2026 - Angel Capital
- 2025 - Sepals
- 2024 - Kimochi
- 2023 - Magic Time
- 2022 - Callsign Mav
- 2021 - Sierra Sue
- 2020 - Behemoth
- 2019 - Begood Toya Mother
- 2018 - Jungle Cat
- 2017 - Santa Ana Lane
- 2016 - Bon Aurum
- 2015 - Stratum Star
- 2014 - Trust In A Gust
- 2013 - Rebel Dane
- 2012 - Moment Of Change
- 2011 - Toorak Toff
- 2010 - Response
- 2009 - Turffontein
- 2008 - Orange County
- 2007 - Bon Hoffa
- 2006 - Rewaaya
- 2005 - Barely A Moment
- 2004 - Regal Roller
- 2003 - Exceed And Excel
- 2002 - Pernod
- 2001 - Mr. Murphy
- 2000 - Testa Rossa
- 1999 - Testa Rossa
- 1998 - Lord Luskin
- 1997 - Cut Up Rough
- 1996 - Encosta De Lago
- 1995 - Our Maizcay
- 1994 - Poetic King
- 1993 - Black Rouge
- 1992 - Mannerism
- 1991 - St. Jude
- 1990 - Submariner
- 1989 - Potrero
- 1988 - Rancho Ruler
- 1987 - Western Pago
- 1986 - Canny Lass
- 1985 - Trichelle
- 1984 - King Phoenix
- 1983 - Ranger's Son
- 1982 - Magari
- 1981 - Soldier Of Fortune
- 1980 - Torbek
- 1979 - Private Talk
- 1978 - Manikato
- 1977 - Raffindale
- 1976 - Private Talk
- 1975 - Cap D'Antibes
- 1974 - Ptery's Son
- 1973 - Millefleurs
- 1972 - Proud Toff
- 1971 - Tauto
- 1970 - Tauto
- 1969 - Heralding
- 1968 - Joking
- 1967 - Snub
- 1966 - Maritana
- 1965 - Nicopolis
- 1964 - Ripa
- 1963 - Samson
- 1962 - Anonyme
- 1961 - Anonyme
- 1960 - My Peak
- 1959 - St. Joel
- 1958 - Gay Saba
- 1957 - Luire
- 1956 - St. Joel
- 1955 - Matrice
- 1954 - Rio Janeiro
- 1953 - St. Joel
- 1952 - Fetlar
- 1951 - Jovial Lad

== See also ==
- Caulfield Guineas Prelude
- How Now Stakes
- Naturalism Stakes
- Sir John Monash Stakes
- Thousand Guineas Prelude
- Underwood Stakes
- List of Australian Group races
- Group races
