= Horse racing in Australia =

A number of forms of horse racing are carried out in Australia:

- Thoroughbred racing in Australia
- Harness racing in Australia
- Steeplechase racing in Australia
