= Caulfield Racecourse =

Horse racing venue in Melbourne, Australia

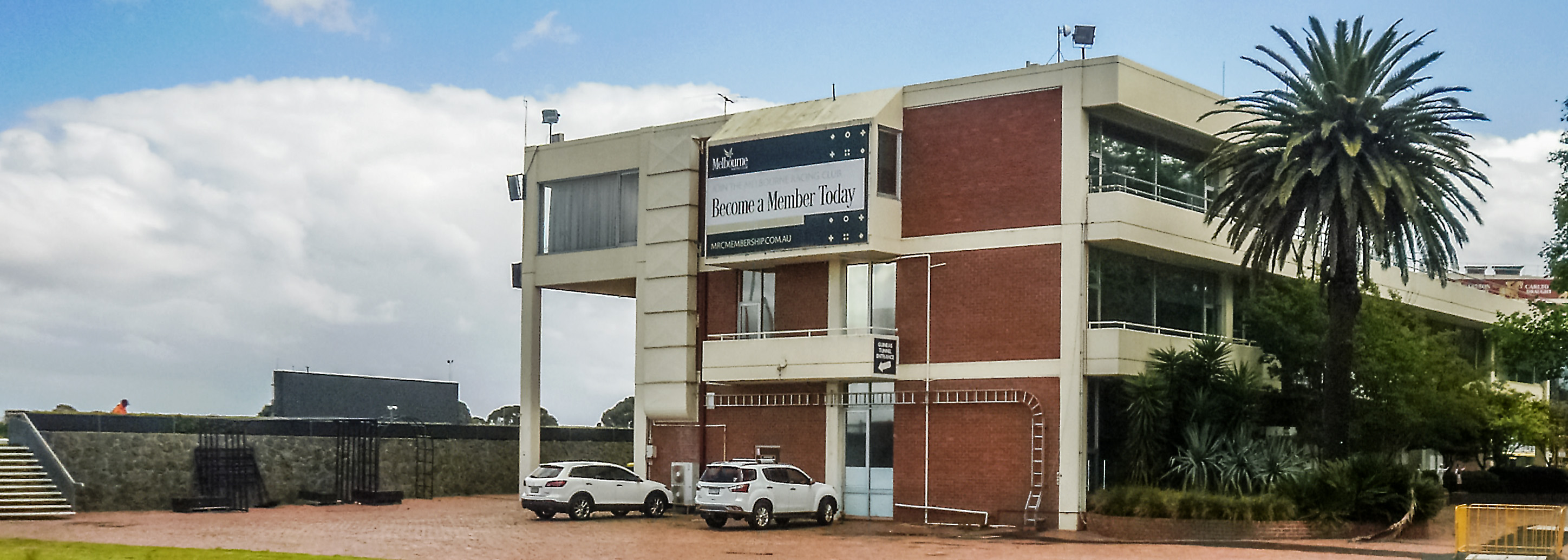
- The racecourse grandstand in 2021
- Interactive map of Caulfield Racecourse
- Location: Caulfield East, Melbourne, Victoria, Australia
- Coordinates: 37°52′52″S 145°2′24″E
- Owned by: Government of Victoria (Crown land via the Caulfield Racecourse Reserve Trust)
- Operated by: Melbourne Racing Club
- Date opened: 1859; 167 years ago
- Screened on: Seven Network
- Notable races: Caulfield Cup; Caulfield Guineas; Blue Diamond Stakes; C F Orr Stakes; Oakleigh Plate; Underwood Stakes; Futurity Stakes

Caulfield Racecourse
- Location of the racecourse in Greater Metropolitan Melbourne

History
- Built: 1919–1950s

Site notes
- Architect: Albion Heath Walkley
- Architectural style: Inter-war Moderne

Victorian Heritage Register
- Official name: Caulfield Racecourse
- Type: Registered place
- Criteria: a., d., e., g., h.
- Designated: 23 February 2023
- Reference no.: VHR H2415
- Category: Recreation and Entertainment

The Caulfield Racecourse is a horse-racing track, located in Caulfield East, in the south-eastern suburbs of Melbourne, in Victoria, Australia. Operated by the Melbourne Racing Club, it is one of Melbourne's best-known racecourses, known locally as The Heath. Situated approximately nine kilometres (six miles) from the Melbourne city centre, on the Caulfield Racecourse Reserve, the crown land was set aside for the purposes of [horse] racing, recreation, and as a public park.

The course is best known for hosting the Caulfield Cup in October annually, a Group 1 open handicap over 2,400 metres (7,900 ft), held in advance of Australia's premier horse race, the Melbourne Cup.

Developed on the traditional lands of the Bunurong people, the racecourse and its improvements were added to the Victorian Heritage Register on 23 February 2023 in recognition of its historical, architectural, aesthetic, and social significance.

== History ==
Horse-racing started at Caulfield in 1859 on a bush track where the Melbourne Hunt Club met. A racecourse was laid out on the site of the club's dog kennels. In 1876, the Victoria Amateur Turf Club was established and the first Caulfield Cup race was run in 1879.

The racecourse has a collection of comparatively intact racecourse-related buildings and elements of some distinction, dating from the first half of the twentieth century. Most of the building were completed in the Inter-war Moderne style. These include the Boomerang Buffet building (1919); the gatehouse at the main entrance (1928); sections of the boundary wall to the racecourse; the Scratchings Board building (1920s); the Afternoon Tea or Luncheon Room (1939); the Hiskens Stand (1935); and the extensive collection of race day horse stalls (1920s–1950s). The Betting Indicator Board from the 1950s is an early, rare and substantial surviving example of its type. The built elements are complemented by a landscape that is characterised by the expanse of the track, central flat and mature trees.

== Description ==
The track has a triangular-shaped layout, comprising three straights, 30-metre (98 ft) wide, with a total circumference of 2.08-kilometre (1.29 mi) and a finishing straight of 367-metre (1,204 ft). All turns have a 4% to 6% banking. Racing takes place in an anti-clockwise direction. The totally glassed in Rupert Clarke stand provides an uninterrupted view of the racecourse.

Caulfield has about 25 race days each season and hosts some of the Australia's most famous and historic races including the Caulfield Cup, Caulfield Guineas, Blue Diamond Stakes, C F Orr Stakes, Oakleigh Plate, Underwood Stakes and Futurity Stakes.

=== Reconstruction ===
In late 1995, the racing track was reconstructed and re-opened in April 1996. Modifications included widening the track to 30 metres (98 ft) around the entire circumference and the straight lengthened by 43 metres (141 ft). The new racing surface was cambered from the outside running rail with the crown of the track at the outside running rail. The banking on the turn into the home straight is four percent, while the other turns have an equivalent banking of two percent. Further to the major works in 1996, the Caulfield track was re-laid in 2005 immediately preceding the Caulfield Cup Carnival and resumed racing for the Summer Classics Carnival, in February 2006.

== Transport ==
The racecourse can be accessed via Melbourne tram route 3 and the journey time is approximately 35 minutes from the city centre.

The Caulfield railway station is less than one hundred metres (three hundred and twenty-eight feet) from the racecourse and is located on the Frankston, Cranbourne and Pakenham lines. Trains depart every ten minutes from Flinders Street station in the city centre.

Parking is available for people with a disability, located opposite the main entrance on Station Street. Lift access to grandstands and disabled toilets is available. There is also a baby change room and first aid facilities.

== Races ==
The following is a list of Group races which are run at Caulfield Racecourse.

=== Group 1 races ===
Race name	Age	Sex	Weight	Distance (metres)	Date
Blue Diamond Stakes	2YO	Open	sw	1,200	February
C F Orr Stakes	Open	Open	wfa	1,400	February
Caulfield Cup	Open	Open	scp	2,400	October
Caulfield Guineas	3YO	Open	sw	1,600	October
Might and Power Stakes	3YO+	Open	wfa	2,000	October
Futurity Stakes	Open	Open	wfa	1,400	February
Sir Rupert Clarke Stakes	Open	Open	hcp	1,400	September
Oakleigh Plate	Open	Open	hcp	1,100	February
The Thousand Guineas	3YO	Fillies	sw	1,600	October
Toorak Handicap	Open	Open	hcp	1,600	October
Memsie Stakes	3YO+	Open	wfa	1,400	August
Underwood Stakes	3YO+	Open	wfa	1,800	September

=== Group 2 races ===
Race name	Age	Sex	Weight	Distance (metres)	Date
Angus Armanasco Stakes	3YO	Fillies	sw	1,600	February
Caulfield Autumn Classic	3YO	Open	sw	1,800	February
Caulfield Sprint	Open	Open	hcp	1,100	October
Herbert Power Stakes	Open	Open	qlty	2,400	October
J J Liston Stakes	3YO+	Open	wfa	1,400	August
Schillaci Stakes	3YO+	Open	wfa	1,000	October
St George Stakes	Open	Open	wfa	1,800	February
Tristarc Stakes	4YO+	Mares	sw+p	1,400	October

=== Group 3 races ===
Race name	Age	Sex	Weight	Distance (metres)	Date
Bletchingly Stakes	Open	Open	wfa	1,100	August
Blue Diamond Prelude C&G	2YO	C&G	sw	1,100	February
Blue Diamond Prelude Fillies	2YO	Fillies	sw	1,100	February
Coongy Handicap	Open	Open	hcp	2,000	October
Easter Cup	Open	Open	hcp	2,000	April
Caulfield Guineas Prelude	3YO	C&G	sw+p	1,400	September
HDF McNeil Stakes	3YO	Open	sw+p	1,100	August
How Now Stakes	4YO+	Mares	sw+p	1,200	September
Hyderabad Stakes	3YO+	F&M	sw+p	1,200	February
Mannerism Stakes	4YO+	Mares	sw+p	1,400	February
Moonga Stakes	4YO+	Open	sw+p	1,400	October
Naturalism Stakes	Open	Open	hcp	2,000	September
Norman Robinson Stakes	3YO	Open	sw+p	2,000	October
Rubiton Stakes	Open	Open	wfa	1,100	January
Sir John Monash Stakes	Open	Open	wfa	1,100	July
T.S. Carlyon Cup	Open	Open	sw+p	1,400	February
Thoroughbred Club Stakes	3YO	Fillies	sw+p	1,200	October
Thousand Guineas Prelude	3YO	Fillies	sw+p	1,400	September
Victoria Handicap	Open	Open	hcp	1,400	April
W W Cockram Stakes	4YO+	Mares	sw+p	1,200	August

== Land management ==
The Caulfield Racecourse Reserve Act (VIC) 2017, established a Trust to plan for the future of the reserve, develop and maintain the reserve. The Trust reports publicly on its activities, informed by a Land Management Plan, through an annual report to the Parliament of Victoria.

== Examinations ==
Aside from its use for racing, the Caulfield Racecourse is also used by the VCAA to examine students who are unable to attend examinations at their schools as well as by Open Universities Australia (OUA) and its universities for the end of the study period examinations. The facility is also used for end of semester examinations by universities such as Monash University. The UMAT is also held at Caulfield Racecourse.

== See also ==
- Horseracing in Australia
- List of places on the Victorian Heritage Register in the City of Glen Eira
