= 1997 Melbourne Cup =

Edition of the Melbourne Cup

- Melbourne Cup
- Location: Flemington Racecourse
- Date: 4 Nov 1997
- Distance: 3200 Meters
- Winning horse: Might and Power
- Winning time: 3:18.3
- Final odds: 7/2
- Jockey: Jim Cassidy
- Trainer: Jack Denham
- Surface: Turf

Might And Power shook off Linesman though, at the 300 he raced out by two lengths with Doriemus challenging, Ebony Grosve getting a rail's run followed by Grandmaster and Markham. Might and Power the leader inside the 200 two lengths in front of Linesman and then Doriemus on the outside. Might and Power the leader, Doriemus trying hard is coming at him. Might and Power and Doriemus, Doriemus getting to Might ad Power they hit the line photo, oh! Nothing between Doriemus or Might And Power in a close go.

— Commentator Greg Miles describes the climax of the race

The 1997 Melbourne Cup was a two-mile handicap horse race which took place on Tuesday, 4 November 1997. The race, run over 3,200 metres (1.988 mi), at Flemington Racecourse.

The race was won by Might And Power who completed the Caulfield Cup-Melbourne Cup double after winning the former by seven lengths which incurred a 3.5 kg penalty. In both races 1995 Cup winner Doriemus finished second. Leading from the front under Jim Cassidy Might And Power held off Doriemus whose jockey Greg Hall famously flashed his whip in a victory salute only for Might and Power to win in the Photo finish.

Might and Power would go on to win Tancred Stakes, AJC Queen Elizabeth Stakes, Doomben Cup, Cox Plate (joining Rising Fast as the only horse to win all races in the Spring Grand Slam) to claim the tile of World Champion Stayer of 1997-98.

The 1997 race was the second victory for Jim Cassidy, who had previously won the 1983 Melbourne Cup with Kiwi. It was the only Melbourne Cup win for veteran trainer Jack Denham. Might And Power was the first of three Melbourne Cup winners for the sire Zabeel, followed by Jezabeel in 1998 and Efficient in 2007.

The race was also noteworthy because of serial pest Peter Hore who ran onto the track during the race.

== Field ==
This is a list of horses which ran in the 1997 Melbourne Cup.

Place	Horse	Trainer	Jockey
1st	Might and Power	Jack Denham	Jim Cassidy
2nd	Doriemus	Lee Freedman	Greg Hall
3rd	Markham	Cliff Brown	Mick Dittman
4th	Harbour Dues	Lady Anne Herries	R Cochrane
5th	Linesman	Gai Waterhouse	Larry Cassidy
6th	Arabian Story	Lord Huntingdon	Frankie Dettori
7th	Skybeau	L Smith	Dwayne Dunn
8th	Ebony Grosve	Graeme Rogerson	Shane Dye
9th	Sapio	Sylvia Kay	Danny Nikolic
10th	Grandmaster	Bart Cummings	L Beasley
11th	Court Of Honour	Peter Hayes	Brent Thomson
12th	Magnet Bay	D Frye	Chris Johnson
13th	Vialli	Paul O'Sullivan	B York
14th	Always Aloof	Lee Freedman	Steven King
15th	Scrupulous	J Smith	M Carson
16th	Yobro	K Roberts	G Cooksley
17th	Sunny Lane	Charlie Goggin	B Stanley
18th	Marble Halls	Lee Freedman	Damien Oliver
19th	Alfa	Bart Cummings	Darren Beadman
20th	Bonsai Pipeline	R Thomas	Gary Grylls
21st	Crying Lane	A Johnson	Greg Childs
22nd	Count Chivas	S Morrish	D Brereton
