= 1998 Melbourne Cup =

- Melbourne Cup
- Location: Flemington Racecourse; Melbourne, Australia
- Date: 3 November 1998
- Distance: 3,200 metres
- Winning horse: Jezabeel
- Winning time: 3:18.59
- Jockey: Chris Munce
- Trainer: Brian Jenkins
- Surface: Grass
- Attendance: 100,607

At the 400, Persian Punch is tackled by Jezabeel wider out Faithful Son, here's come Champagne and Taufan's Melody is coming with her. Jezabeel tackled by Champagne now they reach the 200 meters, the New Zealand mares together. Jezabeel and Champagne, Yorkshire pushing through from Taufan's Melody, Persian Punch. Champagne from Jezabeel, Champagne and Jezabeel kicking back, Jezabeel kicks on the inside, Jezabeel, beat Champagne, a New Zealand quinella!

— Commentator Greg Miles describes the climax of the race

The 1998 Melbourne Cup was the 138th running of the Melbourne Cup, a prestigious Australian Thoroughbred horse race. The race, run over 3,200 metres (1.988 mi), was held on Tuesday, 3 November 1998 at Melbourne's Flemington Racecourse.

The race was won in 3 mins 18.59s by the New Zealand bred and trained mare Jezabeel (Zabeel-Passefleur) from another kiwi bred and trained mare, Champagne. Both of them were also by Zabeel and carried 51 kg while the third place-getter, Persian Punch (Ireland) carried 56.5kg.

== Field ==
Place	Horse	Jockey	Trainer
1st	Jezabeel	Chris Munce	Brian Jenkins
2nd	Champagne	Glen Boss	Laurie Laxon
3rd	Persian Punch	Richard Quinn	David Elsworth
4th	Taufan's Melody	P. Payne	Lady Herries
5th	Yorkshire	Danny Nikolic	Paul Cole
6th	Tie the Knot	Shane Dye	Guy Walter
7th	Faithful Son	Frankie Dettori	Saeed bin Suroor
8th	Skybeau	Larry Cassidy	L J Smith
9th	Perpetual Check	Len Beasley	Bart Cummings
10th	Markham	Danny Brereton	Cliff Brown
11th	Darazari	Opie Bosson	Bruce Wallace
12th	Sheer Danzig	Damien Oliver	R W Armstrong
13th	Yippyio	Jim Cassidy	Jack Denham
14th	Joss Sticks	Rod Quinn	Bob Pearse
15th	Arena	Corey Brown	John Hawkes
16th	The Hind	Basil Marcus	P Hayes
17th	Peak of Perfection	J Saimee	M Thwaites
18th	Ancient City	Brett Prebble	Cindy Alderson
19th	Doriemus	Greg Hall	Lee Freedman
20th	Count Chivas	Rod Griffiths	Simon Morrish
21st	Aerosmith	Greg Childs	Peter & Nikki Hurdle
22nd	Gold Guru	Brian York	Leon Macdonald
23rd	Second Coming	Eddie Wilkinson	Michael Moroney
Failed to finish	Three Crowns	Simon Price	M Thwaites

== Fatality ==
Three Crowns was euthanised after shattering a leg.
