= 1995 Melbourne Cup =

Two-mile handicap horse race

- Melbourne Cup
- Location: Flemington Racecourse
- Date: 7 November 1995
- Distance: 2 miles
- Winning horse: Doriemus
- Winning time: 3:27.6
- Final odds: 10/1
- Jockey: Damien Oliver
- Trainer: Lee Freedman
- Owner: Pacers Aus Syndicate
- Surface: Turf

They're at the 300 now, Doriemus whipped to lead, the three year old Nothin' Leica Dane coming at him, they're clear of Coachwood and then came Quick Ransom. It's Doriemus in front inside the 200 meter mark, led by a length to Nothin' Leica Dane giving everything, then Quick Ransom, Coachwood and Vintage Crop. But it's all Doriemus at the hundred, raced away three lengths to Nothin' Leica Dane and then came Vintage Crop, but Doremius takes the double! Doremius three and a half, Nothin' Leica Dane runs second.

— Commentator Greg Miles describes the climax of the race

The 1995 Melbourne Cup was a two-mile handicap horse race which took place on Tuesday, 7 November 1995. The race was run over 3,200 metres (1.988 mi), at Flemington Racecourse.

The race was won by the New Zealand bred gelding, Doriemus. Doriemus at 10/1 defeated the 3 year old colt, Nothin' Leica Dane and the 1993 Melbourne Cup winner, Vintage Crop. The previous year's winners, Jeune and Wayne Harris, competed again but could only manage 15th place.

Doreimus who had previously won the Caulfield Cup was sired by Norman Pentaquad (USA) (by Riverman) out of the dam Golden Woods by Zamazaan (FR).

Doriemus was the eighth horse to win the Cups double. In 1997 he ran second to Might and Power in both Cups.

This was the first Melbourne Cup win for Damien Oliver.

The Irish-bred Double Trigger who finished 17th was the top weight in the race carrying 60.5 kgs, ahead of the two previous Melbourne Cup winners Vintage Crop (3rd) and Jeune (15th) on 59kg.

== Field ==
This is a list of horses which ran in the 1995 Melbourne Cup.

Place	Horse	Weight	Trainer	Jockey
1st	Doriemus	54.5	Lee Freedman	Damien Oliver
2nd	Nothin' Leica Dane	47.5	Gai Waterhouse	Shane Dye
3rd	Vintage Crop	59	Dermot Weld	Michael Kinane
4th	Quick Ransom	52	Lee Freedman	Mick Dittman
5th	Coachwood	50	Lee Freedman	Brian York
6th	Beaux Art	50	D A Edwards	David Taggart
7th	Storm	51	Lee Freedman	Greg Hall
8th	All In Fun	55.5	John Wheeler	Shane Scriven
9th	Dupain	48	A R Bell	Stephen Baster
10th	Bullwinkle	53	Michael Kent	Frankie Dettori
11th	Count Chivas	53	Don Sellwood	Rod Griffiths
12th	Few Are Chosen	51.5	Gai Waterhouse	Larry Cassidy
13th	Yes Indeed	51.5	R A Crowley	Jock Caddigan
14th	Electronic	48.5	Gai Waterhouse	Glen Boss
15th	Jeune	59	Peter Hayes	Wayne Harris
16th	The Phantom Chance	57	John Wheeler	Robert Vance
17th	Double Trigger	60.5	Mrs S Johnston	Jason Weaver
18th	Double Take	52	Royce Dowling	John Didham
19th	Daacha	53	John F. Meagher	Brett Prebble
20th	Sir Kingi	52	Noel Eales	Peter Hutchinson
21st	Stony Bay	54	Gai Waterhouse	Darren Beadman
