= Doriemus =

New Zealand-bred Thoroughbred racehorse

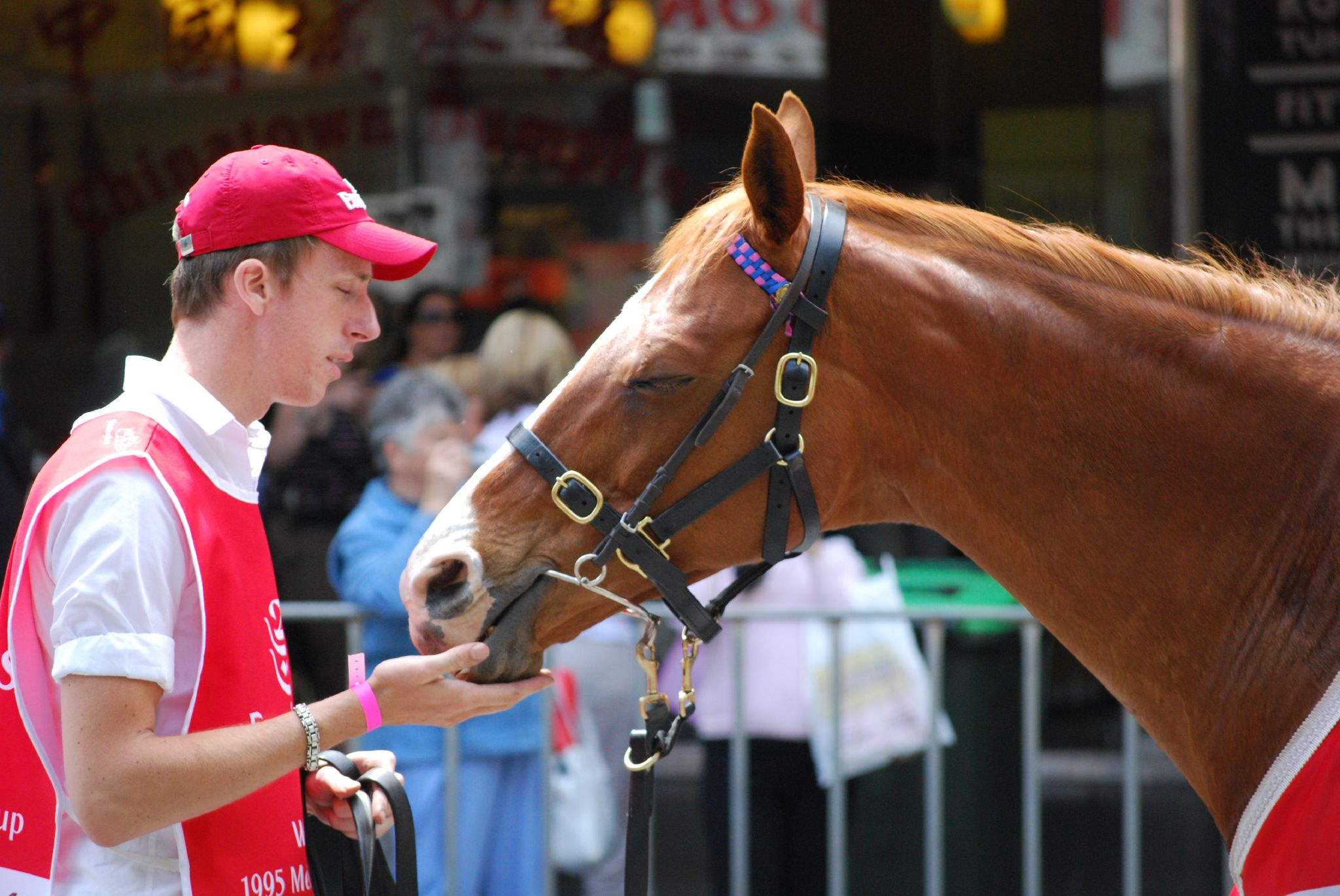
- Doriemus with his strapper.
- Sire: Norman Pentaquad (USA)
- Grandsire: Riverman
- Dam: Golden Woods
- Damsire: Zamazaan
- Sex: Gelding
- Foaled: 17 November 1990
- Died: 11 January 2015 (aged 24)
- Country: New Zealand
- Colour: Chestnut
- Trainer: Lee Freedman
- Record: 44: 9-8-4
- Earnings: $3,588,412

Major wins
- Caulfield Cup (1995); Melbourne Cup (1995); Queen Elizabeth Stakes (1996); Turnbull Stakes (1996)

Doriemus (17 November 1990 – 11 January 2015) was a Thoroughbred racehorse who began his career in New Zealand and rose to prominence in Australia by winning the Caulfield and Melbourne Cups in 1995. He was the eighth of just nine horses to complete the double in the same year.

== Breeding ==
He was bred to stay, being by Norman Pentaquad (USA) (by Riverman) out of Golden Woods by Zamazaan (FR). Doriemus was foaled in New Zealand and was a half-brother to the filly, Margaux by War Hawk II (GB).

== Racing career ==
After two wins from three starts in New Zealand, Doriemus was transferred to Lee Freedman late in his three-year-old term, in the winter of 1994. The small, wiry chestnut won by four lengths on his Australian debut, but was considered immature and spelled.

He won only twice as a four-year-old, but did enough to qualify for the following year's Caulfield Cup. Carrying 52 kilograms, and ridden patiently by Damien Oliver, Doriemus overhauled South Australian and West Australian Derby winners, Count Chivas and Beaux Art over the closing stages. Penalised 2.5 kilograms for the 1995 Melbourne Cup, to take his weight to 54.5 kilograms, Doriemus revelled in the rain-affected going to defeat Victoria Derby winner Nothin' Leica Dane and Irish Champion and 1993 Melbourne Cup winner Vintage Crop. Freedman and Oliver had earlier combined to win Caulfield Cups with Mannerism and Paris Lane, and Doriemus was the third of Freedman's five Melbourne Cup winners, and the first of three for Oliver.

In 1996, Doriemus won the Queen Elizabeth Stakes, in the autumn, and the Turnbull Stakes, in the spring, but was fourth and sixth, respectively, in the Cups. In 1997, he bled in Octagonal's Australian Cup, but returned to run second to Might and Power in both Cups. Doriemus's jockey, Greg Hall, believed he had won the 1997 Melbourne Cup, and gave a wave of his whip after crossing the line, but the photo showed Might and Power had prevailed by the barest of margins. In the autumn, Doriemus was again placed behind Might and Power in the Mercedes Classic, and was runner-up to Tie the Knot in the Sydney Cup. In his final campaign, in the spring of 1998, he was second in the Metropolitan but finished 19th in the Melbourne Cup.

Doriemus was retired to Living Legends, the International Home of Rest for Champion Horses in Woodlands Historic Park, Greenvale, Victoria.

He was euthanised in January 2015 following a paddock accident aged 24.

== Race record ==
1993–94 season as a three-year-old
Result	Date	Race	Venue	Group	Distance	Weight (kg)	Jockey	Winner/2nd
10th	23 Mar 1994	No Age Restriction Hcp	Te Rapa	NA	2100 m	60	Matthew Williamson	1st - Tele Lies
Won	20 Apr 1994	No Age Restriction Hcp	Te Rapa	NA	2100 m	55	M. Williamson	2nd - Shubier
Won	7 May 1994	No Age Restriction Hcp	Trentham	NA	2100 m	55.5	David Walker	2nd - Markay Star
Won	28 May 1994	No Age Restriction Hcp	Doomben	NA	2200 m	51.5	Larry Cassidy	2nd - Booked

1994–95 season as a four-year-old
Result	Date	Race	Venue	Group	Distance	Weight (kg)	Jockey	Winner/2nd
4th	01 Oct 1994	No Age Restriction Hcp	Flemington	NA	1405 m	52	Greg Hall	1st - Monsieur
Won	15 Oct 1994	4yo & Up Restricted	Caulfield	NA	2000 m	57	Damien Oliver	2nd - Ice Doctor
Won	05 Nov 1994	Grey Smith Stakes	Flemington	LR	2000 m	55.5	D. Oliver	2nd - Seto Bridge
3rd	12 Nov 1994	Sandown Cup	Sandown	G2	2400 m	55	D. Oliver	1st - Our Pompeii
2nd	13 May 1995	No Age Restriction Hcp	Doomben	NA	1350 m	57	Tad Pattillo	1st - Lady Nickelii
16th	27 May 1995	BATC Sprint	Doomben	LR	1350 m	55.5	S. Sharman	1st - Cohort
2nd	12 Jun 1995	Thai International Stakes	Eagle Farm	LR	1600 m	56.5	D. Oliver	1st - Monopolize

1995–96 season as a five-year-old
Result	Date	Race	Venue	Group	Distance	Weight (kg)	Jockey	Winner/2nd
9th	02 Sep 1995	Memsie Stakes	Caulfield	G2	1400 m	58.5	Brett Prebble	1st - Island Morn
8th	23 Sep 1995	Underwood Stakes	Caulfield	G1	1800 m	59	G. Hall	1st - Sharscay
2nd	07 Oct 1995	Turnbull Stakes	Flemington	G2	2000 m	56	Danny Nikolic	1st - All Our Mob
Won	21 Oct 1995	Caulfield Cup	Caulfield	G1	2400 m	52	D. Oliver	2nd - Count Chivas
Won	07 Nov 1995	Melbourne Cup	Flemington	G1	3200 m	54.5	D. Oliver	2nd - Nothin' Leica Dane
12th	02 Mar 1996	Futurity Stakes	Flemington	G1	1400 m	57.5	Steven King	1st - Star Dancer
16th	06 Apr 1996	Doncaster Handicap	Randwick	G1	1600 m	57.5	R. Thompson	1st - Sprint By
Won	20 Apr 1996	Queen Elizabeth Stakes	Randwick	G1	2000 m	58	Shane Dye	2nd - Juggler
2nd	18 May 1996	Doomben Cup	Doomben	G1	2040 m	57.5	S. Dye	1st - Juggler

1996–97 season as a six-year-old
Result	Date	Race	Venue	Group	Distance	Weight (kg)	Jockey	Winner/2nd
7th	07 Sep 1996	Craiglee Stakes	Flemington	G2	1600 m	58.5	D. Oliver	1st - Saleous
6th	22 Sep 1996	Underwood Stakes	Caulfield	G1	1800 m	59	G. Hall	1st - Octagonal
Won	05 Oct 1996	Turnbull Stakes	Flemington	G2	2000 m	59	G. Hall	2nd - Beaux Art
4th	19 Oct 1996	Caulfield Cup	Caulfield	G1	2400 m	58	D. Oliver	1st - Arctic Scent
6th	05 Nov 1996	Melbourne Cup	Flemington	G1	3200 m	58	D. Oliver	1st - Saintly
8th	08 Feb 1997	C F Orr Stakes	Caulfield	G1	1400 m	57.5	G. Hall	1st - Cut Up Rough
8th	22 Feb 1997	Clyon Cup	Caulfield	G2	1800 m	61	G. Hall	1st - Peep On The Sly
10th	10 Mar 1997	Australian Cup	Flemington	G1	2000 m	58	G. Hall	1st - Octagonal

1997–98 season as a seven-year-old
Result	Date	Race	Venue	Group	Distance	Weight (kg)	Jockey	Winner/2nd
3rd	30 Aug 1997	Memsie Stakes	Caulfield	G2	1400 m	58.5	G. Hall	1st - Tarnpir Lane
7th	13 Sep 1997	Feehan Stakes	Moonee Valley	G2	1600 m	58.5	G. Hall	1st - Arctic Scent
6th	04 Oct 1997	Turnbull Stakes	Flemington	G2	2000 m	59	G. Hall	1st - Marble Halls
2nd	18 Oct 1997	Caulfield Cup	Caulfield	G1	2400 m	57.5	G. Hall	1st - Might and Power
2nd	04 Nov 1997	Melbourne Cup	Flemington	G1	3200 m	57.5	G. Hall	1st - Might and Power
8th	14 Feb 1998	C F Orr Stakes	Caulfield	G1	1400 m	57.5	Rod Griffiths	1st - Special Dane
6th	28 Feb 1998	St George Stakes	Caulfield	G2	1800 m	58	G. Hall	1st - Dane Ripper
10th	09 Mar 1998	Australian Cup	Flemington	G1	2000 m	58	G. Hall	1st - Dane Ripper
3rd	04 Apr 1998	Mercedes Classic	Rosehill	G1	2400 m	58.5	G. Hall	1st - Might and Power
2nd	18 Apr 1998	Sydney Cup	Randwick	G1	3200 m	59	G. Hall	1st - Tie The Knot

1998–99 season as an eight-year-old
Result	Date	Race	Venue	Group	Distance	Weight (kg)	Jockey	Winner/2nd
7th	29 Aug 1998	Memsie Stakes	Caulfield	G2	1400 m	58	G. Hall	1st - Dane Ripper
3rd	12 Sep 1998	Feehan Stakes	Moonee Valley	G2	1600 m	58	G. Hall	1st - Aerosmith
7th	20 Sep 1998	Underwood Stakes	Caulfield	G1	1800 m	58	G. Hall	1st - Tie The Knot
2nd	05 Oct 1998	Metropolitan Handicap	Randwick	G1	2600 m	52.5	G. Hall	1st - In Joyment
6th	24 Oct 1998	Cox Plate	Moonee Valley	G1	2040 m	58	G. Hall	1st - Might and Power
19th	03 Nov 1998	Melbourne Cup	Flemington	G1	3200 m	58	G. Hall	1st - Jezabeel

== Pedigree ==
Pedigree of Doriemus (NZ)
Sire Norman Pentaquad (USA) 1983	Riverman (USA); 1969	Never Bend (USA); 1960	Nasrullah (GB)
Sire Norman Pentaquad (USA) 1983	Riverman (USA); 1969	Never Bend (USA); 1960	Lalun (USA)
Sire Norman Pentaquad (USA) 1983	Riverman (USA); 1969	River Lady (USA); 1971	Prince John (USA)
Sire Norman Pentaquad (USA) 1983	Riverman (USA); 1969	River Lady (USA); 1971	Nile Lily (USA)
Sire Norman Pentaquad (USA) 1983	Lady Rebecca (GB); 1971	Sir Ivor (USA); 1965	Sir Gaylord (USA)
Sire Norman Pentaquad (USA) 1983	Lady Rebecca (GB); 1971	Sir Ivor (USA); 1965	Attica (USA)
Sire Norman Pentaquad (USA) 1983	Lady Rebecca (GB); 1971	Pocahontas (USA); 1955	Roman (USA)
Sire Norman Pentaquad (USA) 1983	Lady Rebecca (GB); 1971	Pocahontas (USA); 1955	How (USA)
Dam Golden Woods (NZ) 1971	Zamazaan (Fr); 1965	Exbury (Fr); 1959	Le Haar (Fr)
Dam Golden Woods (NZ) 1971	Zamazaan (Fr); 1965	Exbury (Fr); 1959	Greensward (GB)
Dam Golden Woods (NZ) 1971	Zamazaan (Fr); 1965	Toyama (Ire); 1955	Tulyar (Ire)
Dam Golden Woods (NZ) 1971	Zamazaan (Fr); 1965	Toyama (Ire); 1955	Rose Olynn (Ire)
Dam Golden Woods (NZ) 1971	Hollywood (NZ); 1950	Underwood (GB); 1944	Bois Roussel (Fr)
Dam Golden Woods (NZ) 1971	Hollywood (NZ); 1950	Underwood (GB); 1944	Snowberry (GB)
Dam Golden Woods (NZ) 1971	Hollywood (NZ); 1950	Gay Triumph (NZ); 1943	Beau Repaire (NZ)
Dam Golden Woods (NZ) 1971	Hollywood (NZ); 1950	Gay Triumph (NZ); 1943	Battleflag (NZ)

== See also ==
- Thoroughbred racing in Australia
- Thoroughbred racing in New Zealand
- List of Melbourne Cup winners
