= Living Legends (charity) =

Nonprofit equine charity

Logo

Living Legends (Living Legends – The International Home of Rest for Champion Horses Incorporated) is a nonprofit equine charity located at 207 Oaklands Road in Woodlands Homestead at Woodlands Historic Park in Greenvale near Melbourne, Australia. Opened to the public on 31 October 2006, the organization's primary activity is bringing champion and popular gelding racehorses back to the people; but it also supports the care of older horses, equine research, education and training to benefit horses of any age or breed.

Modelled on The Horse Trust in Speen, Buckinghamshire, England, Living Legends is a charitable organisation which relies on private and corporate donations and sponsorships.

== Activities ==
Living Legends - The International Home of Rest for Champion Horses Inc. has four main programmes of activities - providing lifetime sanctuary for retired champion racehorses, promoting horse welfare, funding research into horse health and welfare, and educating people about horse health and ownership.

=== Sanctuary ===
Living Legends provides lifetime sanctuary for retired champion thoroughbred gelding racehorses. Based only 6 minutes north of Melbourne Airport, and about 20 km north-west of the Melbourne city centre, Living Legends is open to the public from 10.00 a.m. to 4.00 p.m. daily (except for Christmas Day).

==== Current residents ====
Retired geldings residing at Living Legends are:

- All Times Lucky
- Almandin
- Apache Cat
- Beat The Clock
- Beauty Generation
- Beauty Only
- Brew
- Bullish Luck
- California Memory
- Dances With Dragon
- Efficient
- Fawkner
- Good Ba Ba
- Good Fit
- Harlem
- Lucky Nine
- Maluckyday
- Mr Stunning
- Pakistan Star
- Peniaphobia
- Prince Of Penzance
- Redkirk Warrior
- Russian Emperor
- Santa Ana Lane
- Silent Witness
- So Si Bon
- Super Jockey
- The Cleaner
- Tom Melbourne
- Who Shot Thebarman
- Zavite

==== Notable deceased residents ====
- Durston (d. 9 Jan 2026)
- Designs On Rome (d. 12 Jan 2025)
- Fields of Omagh (d. 8 Jun 2023)
- Rogan Josh (d. 24 Jun 2022)
- Zipping (d. 22 Mar 2022)
- Paris Lane (d. 2 Jul 2021)
- Might and Power (d. 12 Apr 2020)
- Saintly (d. 16 Dec 2016)
- Better Loosen Up (d. 15 Mar 2016)
- Takeover Target (d. 20 Jun 2015)
- Doriemus (d. 11 Jan 2015)
- Admire Rakti (d. 4 November 2014)
- Regal Roller (d. 12 Mar 2014)
- Northerly (d. 9 May 2012)
- Sky Heights (d. 13 Apr 2011)

==== Visit the Living Legends ====
For a cost of $15 (adults) or $10 (concession), people can visit the Living Legends on a self-guided tour. For an extra $10 visitors can meet and mingle with the Living Legends on daily guided tours at 11.00 a.m. and 2.00 p.m.

Based at Woodlands Homestead in Woodlands Historic Park, Living Legends is set in a unique location for a family outing or day trip. People come to visit the Living Legends in their paddocks, see the wild kangaroos, explore the homestead, or to enjoy the gardens and abundant parklands. Living Legends is also a venue for functions and events, including corporate functions, meetings and weddings. The money raised through these activities helps to fund the charitable works of Living Legends.

=== Welfare ===
Living Legends funds research into equine welfare.

=== Research ===
Living Legends funds non-invasive research into equine diseases, such as strangles, sweet itch, colic, grass sickness and cardiology.

=== Education ===
Living Legends runs an education programme to promote responsible horse ownership. Horse owners can call up Living Legends to get advice on caring for their horse.

The charity also offers information on its website on horse health and ownership.

== See also ==
- Old Friends, Inc.
- The Horse Trust
- Thoroughbred Retirement Foundation
- Animal welfare and rights in Australia
