= Ferdinand (horse) =

American-bred Thoroughbred racehorse

- Sire: Nijinsky
- Grandsire: Northern Dancer
- Dam: Banja Luka
- Damsire: Double Jay
- Sex: Stallion
- Foaled: 1983
- Country: United States
- Colour: Chestnut
- Breeder: Howard B. Keck
- Owner: Elizabeth A. Keck
- Trainer: Charlie Whittingham
- Record: 29:8-9-6
- Earnings: $3,777,978

Major wins
- Santa Catalina Stakes (1986); Malibu Stakes (1986); Goodwood Handicap (1987); Cabrillo Handicap (1987); Hollywood Gold Cup (1987); American Classics / Breeders' Cup wins: Kentucky Derby (1986); Breeders' Cup Classic (1987)

Awards
- U.S. Champion Older Male Horse (1987); United States Horse of the Year (1987)
- Last updated on May 6, 2010

Ferdinand (March 12, 1983 – 2002) was a champion Thoroughbred racehorse who won the 1986 Kentucky Derby and 1987 Breeders' Cup Classic and was the 1987 Horse of the Year.

He entered stud in 1989 and was later sold to a breeding farm in Japan in 1994.

Much to the outrage of many horse racing enthusiasts, reports indicate that in 2002, Ferdinand was sent to slaughter in Japan with no fanfare or notice to previous owners. He likely became either pet food or steaks for human consumption. Ferdinand's death was the catalyst for the Ferdinand Fee, an optional donation program to fund keeping old racehorses alive, and several other animal welfare initiatives.

In September 2006, the United States House of Representatives approved H.R. 503, the American Horse Slaughter Prevention Act, which would ban the slaughter of horses in the United States. The bill did not make it out of committee in the Senate, however. In January 2007, the bill was reintroduced. As of 2012, the act has not been passed into law.

== The Ferdinand Fee and Animal Welfare Impact ==
In the summer of 2006, the New York Owners and Breeders' Association, based in Saratoga Springs, New York, initiated the small voluntary per-race charge (collected from owners of NY Breeds) called the "Ferdinand Fee" that will funnel the revenue to Bluegrass Charities and the Thoroughbred Charities of America, two organizations that help fund race horse rescue and retirement groups.

Another small step in maintaining the safety of Thoroughbreds sent to breeding sheds around the world: Some owners are now including buy-back clauses within their stallion contracts. Reportedly, such clauses were included for Kentucky Derby winner Silver Charm (who was moved to Old Friends Equine in Georgetown, Kentucky upon his 2014 retirement after the buy-back clause was invoked) and Dubai World Cup winner Roses in May, both of whom were sent to Japan.

The Indiana-based non-profit Friends of Ferdinand, Inc. was also founded in his memory in 2005. This Thoroughbred Aftercare Alliance-accredited organization purchases, retrains, and re-homes retired race horses in the Midwest.

== Racing career ==
In 1986, Ferdinand entered the Derby under Bill Shoemaker and won the race from starting gate number one.

In 1987, Ferdinand, Kentucky Derby winner of 1986, met Alysheba, Derby winner of 1987, in the Breeders' Cup Classic at Hollywood Park. They reached the wire close together, with Ferdinand winning by a nose over Alysheba. Ferdinand won the titles of Horse of the Year and Champion Older Horse. He was the first Classic winner to win the title, just three years after its inaugural running.

Ferdinand returned to racing in 1988 as a five-year-old, but he lost to Alysheba multiple times. He was then retired and sent to stud.

== Retirement and death ==
Ferdinand retired from racing in 1989 and was sent to stud at Claiborne Farm in Kentucky. Ferdinand was sent to stand stud in Japan in 1994, at Arrow Stud in Hokkaido, where he stood for six seasons. However his popularity among breeders decreased, and in his final year he only covered 10 mares. His owners tried to place him in a riding club without any success, and left Arrow Stud on February 3, 2001, in the hands of Yoshikazu Watanabe, a horse dealer. Ferdinand's registration in Japan was annulled September 1, 2002, and he was likely slaughtered around that time, according to reporter Barbara Bayer of The Blood-Horse.

== Race record ==
Date	Track	Race	Distance (Furlongs)	Finish
9/8/1985	Del Mar	Maiden	6	8
10/6/1985	Santa Anita Park	Maiden	6	3
10/20/1985	Santa Anita Park	Maiden	8	2
11/3/1985	Santa Anita Park	Maiden	8	1
12/15/1985	Hollywood Park	Hollywood Futurity	8	3
1/4/1986	Santa Anita Park	Los Feliz Stakes	8	2
1/29/1986	Santa Anita Park	Santa Catalina Stakes	8 ½	1
2/22/1986	Santa Anita Park	San Rafael Stakes	8	2
4/6/1986	Santa Anita Park	Santa Anita Derby	8 ½	3
5/3/1986	Churchill Downs	Kentucky Derby	10	1
5/17/1986	Pimlico Race Course	Preakness Stakes	9 ½	2
6/7/1986	Belmont Park	Belmont Stakes	12	3
12/26/1986	Santa Anita Park	Malibu Stakes	7	1
1/18/1987	Santa Anita Park	San Fernando Stakes	9	4
2/8/1987	Santa Anita Park	Strub Stakes	10	2
3/8/1987	Santa Anita Park	Santa Anita Handicap	10	2
3/29/1987	Santa Anita Park	San Luis Rey Stakes	12 (turf)	4
5/10/1987	Hollywood Park	John Henry Handicap	9 (turf)	3
6/7/1987	Hollywood Park	Californian Stakes	9	4
6/28/1987	Hollywood Park	Hollywood Gold Cup	10	1
8/29/1987	Del Mar	Cabrillo Handicap	9	1
11/7/1987	Santa Anita Park	Goodwood Handicap	9	1
11/21/1987	Hollywood Park	Breeders' Cup Classic	10	1
2/14/1988	Santa Anita Park	San Antonio Handicap	9	2
3/6/1988	Santa Anita Park	Santa Anita Handicap	10	2
4/17/1988	Santa Anita Park	San Bernardino Handicap	9	2
6/12/1988	Hollywood Park	Californian Stakes	9	4
6/26/1988	Hollywood Park	Hollywood Gold Cup	10	3
10/22/1988	Santa Anita Park	Goodwood Handicap	9	4

== Pedigree ==
Pedigree of Ferdinand
Sire Nijinsky b. 1967	Northern Dancer b. 1961	Nearctic	Nearco
Sire Nijinsky b. 1967	Northern Dancer b. 1961	Nearctic	Lady Angela
Sire Nijinsky b. 1967	Northern Dancer b. 1961	Natalma	Native Dancer
Sire Nijinsky b. 1967	Northern Dancer b. 1961	Natalma	Almahmoud
Sire Nijinsky b. 1967	Flaming Page b. 1959	Bull Page	Bull Lea
Sire Nijinsky b. 1967	Flaming Page b. 1959	Bull Page	Our Page
Sire Nijinsky b. 1967	Flaming Page b. 1959	Flaring Top	Menow
Sire Nijinsky b. 1967	Flaming Page b. 1959	Flaring Top	Flaming Top
Dam Banja Luka b. 1968	Double Jay b. 1944	Balladier	Black Toney
Dam Banja Luka b. 1968	Double Jay b. 1944	Balladier	Blue Warbler
Dam Banja Luka b. 1968	Double Jay b. 1944	Broomshot	Whisk Broom
Dam Banja Luka b. 1968	Double Jay b. 1944	Broomshot	Center Shot
Dam Banja Luka b. 1968	Legato b. 1956	Dark Star	Royal Gem
Dam Banja Luka b. 1968	Legato b. 1956	Dark Star	Isolde
Dam Banja Luka b. 1968	Legato b. 1956	Vulcania	Some Chance
Dam Banja Luka b. 1968	Legato b. 1956	Vulcania	Vagrancy

== See also ==
- Old Friends, Inc.
- The Horse Trust
- Thoroughbred Retirement Foundation
