= The Horse Trust =

British equine charity

- Formation: 1886; 140 years ago
- Registration no.: 231748
- Legal status: Charity
- Purpose: Horse rescue, Horse welfare education
- Website: horsetrust.org.uk

The Horse Trust (formerly The Home of Rest for Horses until September 2006) is an equine charity in the United Kingdom, based at Speen near Princes Risborough in Buckinghamshire. It was founded in 1886 and is the oldest equine charity in the world. It was set up to help the working horses in London. Upon the decline of the working horse in the 1960s it widened its remit to include education and research, becoming the largest provider of equine welfare grants in the United Kingdom.

The Horse Trust's Home of Rest for Horses operates at its Westcroft Stables in the Chiltern Hills between High Wycombe and Aylesbury, in Buckinghamshire. As of 2021 it provides lifetime sanctuary for more than 140 horses, ponies and donkeys.

== Activities ==
The Horse Trust has four main programmes of activities - providing lifetime sanctuary for retired horses, ponies and donkeys, promoting horse welfare, funding research into horse health and welfare, and educating people about horse health and ownership.

=== Sanctuary ===
The Horse Trust provides lifetime sanctuary for around 140 retired horses, ponies and donkeys at its Home of Rest for Horses in Speen, Buckinghamshire.

Residents at the sanctuary come from varied backgrounds including the mounted police force, the mounted Army regiments, the Royal Mews and Riding for the Disabled.

Over the years, the Home of Rest has housed a number of famous horses, including Sefton (army horse), a horse injured by the IRA's Hyde Park bombing on 20 July 1982 and Monarch, who led the team of horses that pulled the Queen's coach during the 2002 Golden Jubilee celebrations.

=== Welfare ===
The Horse Trust funds research into equine welfare and works with the RSPCA to help rehome abandoned or neglected horses, ponies and donkeys. In January 2008, it took in a number of severely neglected horses from Spindles Farm, which The Independent described as "one of the worst cases of animal cruelty in recent history".

=== Research ===
The Horse Trust funds non-invasive research into equine diseases, such as strangles, sweet itch, colic, grass sickness and cardiology. It also funds clinical training scholarships in various areas including surgery and anaesthesia.

In 2008, the charity funded research into Fell pony syndrome, laminitis and small redworms.

=== Education ===
The Horse Trust runs an education programme to promote responsible horse ownership. Horse owners can call up The Horse Trust to get advice on caring for their horse.

The charity also offers information on its website on horse health and ownership and publishes leaflets promoting horse education.

== History ==
In the 19th century, life for many working horses in London was terrible. On 10 May 1886 Ann Lindo, who was inspired by the novel about a horse Black Beauty was determined to help the lives of horses in London and she set up a rest home for horses, mules, and donkeys at a farm at Sudbury, near Harrow. The first resident at the farm was an overworked London cab horse.

Among the supporters of the new Society was Prince Albert and before long the Duke of Portland, Master of the Royal Household, agreed to become the charity President.

The Home was based at various locations in its early years. In Sudbury from 1886 to 1889, then it was based in Acton, west London in (1889–1908), before taking over Westcroft Farm in Cricklewood, which had 20 acres (81,000 m^{2}) of open pasture just four miles (6 km) from Marble Arch.

In 1933, the Home moved to Borehamwood, Hertfordshire where it remained until 1975. The sale of the land from the Borehamwood site allowed the charity to build a new stable complex at Speen Farm in Princes Risborough, where it remains to date.

The charity's initial focus was providing sanctuary for London cab horses and tradesmen's horses. By the mid-1960s, the number of working horses depending on it had declined so the charity's committee decided to extend its activities. As well as continuing to run the sanctuary, the charity started running educational programmes and funding research to improve the health and welfare of horses.

In 2006, The Princess Royal, the patron of the charity, announced that The Home of Rest for Horses had been renamed The Horse Trust to reflect its wider remit.

=== Accolades ===
In 2014, The Horse Trust was shortlisted in the annual Charity Times Awards for the Fundraising Technology category, with The Big Give eventually being crowned the winner - other runners up included IStreet Giving and PayPal Giving Fund/eBay for Charity.

== See also ==
- Old Friends Equine
- Living Legends horse retirement home
- Thoroughbred Retirement Foundation
- List of animal sanctuaries
