= 1986 Kentucky Derby =

Horse race

112th Kentucky Derby
- Kentucky Derby
- Grade I stakes race
- Location: Churchill Downs
- Date: May 3, 1986
- Winning horse: Ferdinand
- Jockey: Bill Shoemaker
- Trainer: Charles E. Whittingham
- Owner: Elizabeth A. Keck
- Conditions: Fast
- Surface: Dirt
- Attendance: 123,819

The 1986 Kentucky Derby was the 112th running of the Kentucky Derby. The race took place on May 3, 1986, with 123,819 people in attendance.

== Full results ==
Finished	Post	Horse	Jockey	Trainer	Owner	Time / behind
1st	1	Ferdinand	Willie Shoemaker	Charles E. Whittingham	Mrs. Elizabeth A. Keck	2:02.80
2nd	3	Bold Arrangement	Chris McCarron	Clive Brittain	Anthony & Raymond Richards	
3rd	6	Broad Brush	Vincent Bracciale Jr.	Richard W. Small	Robert E. Meyerhoff	
4th	5	Rampage	Pat Day	Gary R. Thomas	Nancy & H. John Reed	
5th	7	Badger Land	Jorge Velásquez	D. Wayne Lukas	Lukas, Hartley & Lukas	
6th	8	Wheatly Hall	Gary Stevens	Jack Van Berg	John McKinnon	
7th	16	Fobby Forbes	Randy Romero	Carlos A. Garcia	Due Process Stable	
8th	13	Icy Groom	Eddie Maple	Samuel T. Ramer	William J. Fleming	
9th	12	Wise Times	Keith Allen	Philip A. Gleaves	R. L. Reineman Stable	
10th	2	Mogambo	Jacinto Vásquez	LeRoy Jolley	Peter M. Brant & Calumet Farm	
11th	9	Snow Chief	Alex Solis	Melvin F. Stute	Grinstead & Rochelle	
12th	15	Zabaleta	Darrel McHargue	John Gosden	Michael Riordan	
13th	14	Southern Appeal	Jesse Davidson	Marvin Moncrief	Howard M. Bender	
14th	10	Bachelor Beau	Larry Melancon	Philip M. Hauswald	R. D. Waterfield & J. A. Tafel	
15th	4	Vernon Castle	Eddie Delahoussaye	John B. Sullivan	North Ridge, A. E. Paulson	
16th	11	Groovy	Laffit Pincay Jr.	Howard Crowell	J. A. Ballis & Ted Kruckel	

== Payout ==
Post	Horse	Win	Place	Show
1	Ferdinand	US$37.40	16.00	8.60
3	Bold Arrangement		9.40	6.80
6	Broad Brush			9.20

- $2 Exacta: (1–3) Paid $385.00
