= Thoroughbred Retirement Foundation =

US non-profit organization

- Formation: June 1983; 43 years ago
- Type: Nonprofit
- Tax ID no.: 13-3132741
- Location: Saratoga Springs, New York
- Revenue: $2,770,191 (2015)
- Expenses: $3,088,323 (2015)
- Endowment: $6,513,564
- Website: www.trfinc.org

The Thoroughbred Retirement Foundation (TRF) is an American organization founded in 1982, whose mission is: "To provide dignified lifetime care for retired Thoroughbred racehorses while creating pathways for healing and growth through the transformative power of the human-horse connection."

== History ==
Two years after its founding, the TRF had its first retiree. His name was Promised Road; he was then 9, and an undistinguished campaigner whose career ended with a sixth-place finish in a $3,500 claiming race. There have since been hundreds more like him who have come under the care of the TRF. Ron "Gibby" Gibson the trainer of Promised Road went on to teach at the facility before retiring.

Early in the TRF's history, its founder and chairman of the board, Monique S. Koehler, negotiated an agreement with the State of New York Department of Correctional Services. In exchange for land use and labor at the state's Wallkill Correctional Facility, the TRF would design, staff and maintain a vocational training program in equine care and management for inmates.

Upon the completion of their sentences, many former inmates who have worked with the horses have gone on to become productive citizens and have been quick to give credit to the TRF program. The inmates cannot have committed a sexual crime or first-degree murder. This prison program has been replicated at TRF farms across eight states, including the Blackburn Correctional Facility in Kentucky, Central Maryland Correctional Facility in Sykesville, Maryland, Wateree River Correctional Institution in South Carolina, and Lowell Correctional Facility in Ocala, Florida.

The horses at these farms and several of TRF's other facilities are often so infirm when retired from racing that they cannot continue in another career. However, hundreds of TRF horses have been trained for second careers, as show jumpers, companion horses, handicapped riding horses, and polo horses.

In 2001, the estate of the prominent horse owner and breeder Paul Mellon created a $5 million endowment for the Thoroughbred Retirement Foundation for use in its efforts to rescue and rehabilitate retired race horses. The slaughterhouse killings of famous horses such as the U.S. Hall of Fame horse Exceller and the Kentucky Derby and Breeders' Cup Classic winner Ferdinand both occurred outside the United States but helped raise awareness of what can happen to thoroughbreds, even champions. The TRF also reminds people that the "reality is a Thoroughbred industry made up largely of owners with only modest resources and current economics that dictate that among all owners, no matter how responsible and well-intended, only a relatively few are capable of maintaining even a single Thoroughbred once it is unable to earn its keep on the track."

The TRF is a 501(c)(3) nonprofit tax-exempt organization entirely dependent on public contributions.

== Legal troubles ==
On March 18, 2011, a New York Times article reported that the Thoroughbred Retirement Foundation "...has been so slow or delinquent in paying for the upkeep of the more than 1,000 horses under its care that scores have wound up starved and neglected, some fatally, according to interviews and inspection reports."

In November 2013, the Thoroughbred Retirement Foundation settled a lawsuit with the attorney general of New York State that alleged the foundation mistreated animals in its herd. The settlement noted TRF denied any wrongdoing.

== See also ==
- Old Friends, Inc.
- The Horse Trust
- Living Legends horse retirement home
