= Zoustar =

Australian thoroughbred racehorse

- Sire: Northern Meteor
- Grandsire: Encosta De Lago
- Dam: Zouzou
- Damsire: Redoute's Choice
- Sex: Colt
- Foaled: 8 September 2010
- Country: Australia
- Colour: Bay
- Breeder: Racetree
- Owner: Widden Stud Pty Ltd, Qatar Bloodstock Ltd & Merrow Racing
- Trainer: Chris Waller
- Jockey: Jim Cassidy
- Record: 9: 6-1-0
- Earnings: A$1,411,680

Major wins
- Sires' Produce Stakes (BRC) (2013); Golden Rose Stakes (2013); Roman Consul Stakes (2013); Coolmore Stud Stakes (2013)

Awards
- Australian Champion Sire (2024/25)

Zoustar (foaled 8 September 2010) is a two-time Group 1 winning Australian Thoroughbred racehorse and successful sire who has sired multiple stakes winners.

== Background ==
Originally bred by Racetree Stud outside of Beaudesert, Queensland, Zoustar was sold for A$85,000 at the 2011 National Weanling Sale. He was sold again at the 2012 Magic Millions yearling sale for A$140,000 to syndicator Sheriff Iskander.

== Racing career ==
Zoustar was successful in his first start on the 13 April 2013 winning at Canterbury by almost two-lengths. He won his next two starts culminating in his first stakes race when taking out the Sires' Produce Stakes at Doomben.

As a three-year-old Zoustar won his first Group 1, the Golden Rose Stakes at Rosehill. Trainer Chris Waller said after the race, "He's a serious colt, a valuable colt now … geez he's got a big future."

Three weeks later Zoustar effortlessly won the Roman Consul Stakes at Randwick by a margin of over four-lengths.

This victory ensured that Zoustar would start the even money favourite in the Coolmore Stud Stakes at Flemington a month later on the 2 November 2013. Zoustar won the race comfortably by a margin of two-lengths and allowed jockey Jim Cassidy to ride his 100th Group 1 winner of his career.

After a four month break, Zoustar finished 8th in the Canterbury Stakes and was retired to perform stud duties.

== Stud career ==
Zoustar was purchased for A$18 million by Widden Stud which is located in the Hunter Valley of New South Wales.

Zoustar's service fee for his first four seasons was set at A$44,000. By 2021 this had risen to A$154,000 and in 2022 it stands at A$198,000.

Zoustar shuttles each year to Tweenhills Stud in the Northern Hemisphere.

=== Notable progeny ===
c = colt, f = filly, g = gelding

Foaled	Name	Sex	Major wins
2015	Mizzy	f	Canterbury Stakes
2015	Sunlight	f	Coolmore Stud Stakes, Newmarket Handicap, William Reid Stakes
2015	Zoutori	g	Newmarket Handicap
2019	Climbing Star	f	Robert Sangster Stakes
2019	Zougotcha	f	Flight Stakes, Coolmore Classic
2020	Joliestar	f	The Thousand Guineas, Newmarket Handicap, Kingsford-Smith Cup, TJ Smith Stakes
2020	Lezoo	f	Cheveley Park Stakes
2020	Ozzmosis	c	Coolmore Stud Stakes
2020	Schwarz	c	William Reid Stakes
2021	Starlust	c	Breeders' Cup Turf Sprint
2021	King of Gosford	c	Shoemaker Mile Stakes

== Pedigree ==
Pedigree of Zoustar (AUS) 2010
Sire Northern Meteor (AUS) 2005	Encosta De Lago (AUS); 1993	Fairy King	Northern Dancer
Sire Northern Meteor (AUS) 2005	Encosta De Lago (AUS); 1993	Fairy King	Fairy Bridge
Sire Northern Meteor (AUS) 2005	Encosta De Lago (AUS); 1993	Shoal Creek	Star Way
Sire Northern Meteor (AUS) 2005	Encosta De Lago (AUS); 1993	Shoal Creek	Rolls
Sire Northern Meteor (AUS) 2005	Explosive (USA); 1990	Fappiano	Mr. Prospector
Sire Northern Meteor (AUS) 2005	Explosive (USA); 1990	Fappiano	Killaloe
Sire Northern Meteor (AUS) 2005	Explosive (USA); 1990	Scuff	Forli
Sire Northern Meteor (AUS) 2005	Explosive (USA); 1990	Scuff	Moccasin
Dam Zouzou (AUS) 2001	Redoute's Choice (AUS); 1996	Danehill	Danzig
Dam Zouzou (AUS) 2001	Redoute's Choice (AUS); 1996	Danehill	Razyana
Dam Zouzou (AUS) 2001	Redoute's Choice (AUS); 1996	Shanthas Choice	Canny Lad
Dam Zouzou (AUS) 2001	Redoute's Choice (AUS); 1996	Shanthas Choice	Dancing Show
Dam Zouzou (AUS) 2001	Meteor Mist (AUS); 1987	Star Shower	Star Of Heaven
Dam Zouzou (AUS) 2001	Meteor Mist (AUS); 1987	Star Shower	Show
Dam Zouzou (AUS) 2001	Meteor Mist (AUS); 1987	Sunbuster	Blockbuster
Dam Zouzou (AUS) 2001	Meteor Mist (AUS); 1987	Sunbuster	Sunshine Lass
