= Jim Cassidy (jockey) =

New Zealand jockey

Personal information
- Born: 21 January 1963 (age 63) Wellington, New Zealand
- Occupation: Jockey

Horse racing career
- Sport: Horse racing

Major racing wins
- Melbourne Cup (1983, 1997); W. S. Cox Plate (1998); Caulfield Cup (1997, 2000); Golden Slipper Stakes (2001)

Honours
- Australian Racing Hall of Fame (2012); New Zealand Racing Hall of Fame (2014)

Significant horses
- Might and Power, Kiwi, Rough Habit,
- Updated on 2 March 2017

Jim Cassidy (born 21 January 1963) is a retired New Zealand jockey who has been inducted in both the Australian Racing Hall of Fame and the New Zealand Racing Hall of Fame.

== Life and career ==
Jim Cassidy was one of seven children of Arthur "Blue" and Francie Cassidy of Wellington, New Zealand.

Cassidy initially rode in New Zealand with Pat Campbell in the Hawkes Bay, having over 500 winners in his country of birth. He achieved even greater success in Australia.

Cassidy rode Kiwi from last into the straight to win the 1983 Melbourne Cup. He won his second Melbourne Cup in 1997 aboard Might and Power and they also won the following year's Cox Plate.

Cassidy has won the Australian Derby three times; in 1990, 1993 and in 2009.

Cassidy is the third jockey to win 100 group one races, winning his 100th race aboard Zoustar in the Coolmore Stud Stakes (1200m) at Flemington on Saturday 2 November 2013.

His older brother Ricki was an apprentice jockey to Trevor McKee and Larry V Cassidy, who is seven years younger than Jim, went on to be a Sydney Premiership winning jockey. Larry also started riding in New Zealand before moving to Australia, winning three Sydney premierships and later embarking on stints in Hong Kong, Singapore and Macau. After returning to Australia, Larry continued his riding career in Queensland.

Jim Cassidy's daughter, Nicole, married Brisbane and Hong Kong champion jockey, Zac Purton.

Cassidy released his autobiography titled "Pumper" through Macmillan Books in October 2016.

== Notable wins ==
The following are some of the races Jimmy won in New Zealand and Australia.

Year	Race	Horse	Trainer(s)
1980	Stewards Handicap, Riccarton	Killjoy	J.N.J Healey, Richmond
1981	Brisbane Cup	Four Crowns	D Enright
1981	Wellesley Stakes, Trentham	Bisette	Trevor McKee
1981	Avondale Cup	Alice	Mrs J Hercock, Hastings
1983	Wellington Cup	Kiwi	Snow Lupton, Waverley
1983	Melbourne Cup	Kiwi	Snow Lupton, Waverley
1983	New Zealand 1000 Guineas	Burletta	F P Campbell, Hastings
1983	Levin Classic	Burletta	F P Campbell, Hastings
1984	Manawatu Sires Produce Stakes	Vin D'Armour	J R Lynds, Woodville
1983/84	Canterbury Gold Cup	Commissionaire	Noel D Eales, Awapuni
1983/84	Great Northern Breeders Oaks	Silver Elm	Noel D Eales, Awapuni
1983/84	Matamata Breeders Stakes	Vin D'Armour	J R Lynds, Woodville
1983/84	Eulogy Stakes	Burletta	F P Campbell, Hastings
1983/84	Gold Trail Stakes	Burletta	F P Campbell, Hastings
1984	Cambridge Stud International Stakes	Commissionaire	Noel D Eales, Awapuni
1985	Victoria Derby	Handy Proverb	Brian Mayfield-Smith
1985	Bayer Classic	Bonecrusher	Frank Ritchie
1986	Sydney Cup	Marooned	Brian Mayfield-Smith
1990	Australian Derby	Dr Grace	Dr G Chapman
1991	Doomben Cup	Rough Habit	John Wheeler
1992	Doomben Cup	Rough Habit	John Wheeler
1992	All Aged Stakes	Rough Habit	John Wheeler
1992	AJC Queen Elizabeth Stakes	Rough Habit	John Wheeler
1993	All Aged Stakes	Rough Habit	John Wheeler
1993	Australian Derby	Innocent King	K A Jordan
1993	Doomben Cup	Rough Habit	John Wheeler
1994	Doomben 10,000	Flitter	M Lees
1994	Caulfield Stakes	Rough Habit	John Wheeler
1997	Caulfield Cup	Might and Power	Jack Denham
1997	Melbourne Cup	Might and Power	Jack Denham
1998	W. S. Cox Plate	Might and Power	Jack Denham
1998	Caulfield Stakes	Might and Power	Jack Denham
1999	Manikato Stakes	Redoute's Choice	Rick Hore-Lacy
2000	Rosehill Guineas	Diatribe	George Hanlon
2000	Caulfield Cup	Diatribe	George Hanlon
2001	Golden Slipper Stakes	Ha Ha	Gai Waterhouse
2001	Australasian Oaks	Tempest Morn	Gai Waterhouse
2002	Canterbury Stakes	Empire	Max Lees
2003	Champagne Classic (BRC)	Shamekha	Gai Waterhouse
2003	All Aged Stakes	Arlington Road	Gai Waterhouse
2009	George Ryder Stakes	Vision and Power	Joseph Pride
2009	Australian Derby	Roman Emperor	Bart Cummings
2012	Hawkesbury Gold Cup	Somepin Anypin	Gary Portelli
2012	Doomben 10,000	Sea Siren	John O’Shea
2013	Canterbury Stakes	Pierro	Gai Waterhouse
2013	Coolmore Stud Stakes	Zoustar	Chris Waller
2013	Golden Rose Stakes	Zoustar	Chris Waller
2013	Queensland Derby	Hawkespur	Chris Waller
2015	All Aged Stakes	Dissident	Peter Moody

== See also ==
- Thoroughbred racing in New Zealand
- Thoroughbred racing in Australia
- Lance O'Sullivan
- Shane Dye
