= Wayne Harris (Australian jockey) =

Australian jockey

Wayne Francis Harris (born 17 December 1960) is an Australian jockey who is best known for riding Jeune to victory in the 1994 Melbourne Cup.

Wayne Harris was first apprenticed to Pat Farrell, Muswellbrook, NSW and broke all records as an apprentice (558 race wins) riding in and around the Hunter Valley region of NSW. In addition to his Melbourne Cup victory, he is known widely for winning the STC Golden Slipper Stakes in 1979 aboard Century Miss for master trainer Bart Cummings. He is the youngest rider to achieve the feat. Whilst riding, Wayne rode over 1800 winners including 41 feature race winners in several countries including Australia, Ireland, Singapore and Hong Kong. He rode 35 Group One winners.

Throughout his career Wayne rode for many top-line trainers including Bart Cummings, Gai Waterhouse, T.J Smith, David Hayes and Graeme Begg. His off-field battle with cancer and debilitating health conditions due to race riding is just as courageous as his on-track successes. Wayne is a regular Lexus Melbourne Cup Tour Ambassador taking the coveted Lexus Melbourne Cup Trophy to communities across the land.
