= Chris Munce =

Australian jockey and horse trainer

Personal information
- Born: 17 May 1969 (age 57) Casino, New South Wales, Australia
- Occupation: Jockey

Horse racing career
- Sport: Horse racing

Major racing wins
- Epsom Handicap (1995, 1997); Goodwood Handicap (1996); AJC Metropolitan Handicap (1996, 2000); Stradbroke Handicap (1997, 2000); Doomben 10,000 (1997); Melbourne Cup (1998); Golden Slipper Stakes (1998, 2004); Doncaster Handicap (2001); AJC Sires Produce Stakes (2004); Spring Champion Stakes (2004); Champagne Stakes (2004); Cox Plate (2004); Salinger Stakes (2006); LKS MacKinnon Stakes (2006); Caulfield Cup 2010

Significant horses
- Assertive Lad, Iron Horse, Jezabeel, Rum, Savabeel, Dance Hero, Shower Of Roses, Desert War
- Updated on 2 March 2007

Chris Munce (born 17 May 1969) is a successful Thoroughbred horse racing jockey, having won both the Melbourne Cup and the Cox Plate.

He is now a trainer of horses in Brisbane, Queensland, heading up a family-based operation with his son Corey as co-trainer.

== Overview ==
Originally a Queensland jockey, Munce shared stable jockey duties with Danny Beasley for Gai Waterhouse Racing. During his career Chris Munce has won thirty-five Group One conditions races including some of Australia's most prestigious races:

- Brisbane Cup: Desert Chill (1995)
- Cox Plate: Savabeel (2004)
- Melbourne Cup: Jezabeel (1998)

== Training ==
As a trainer his wins have included:

- 2023 Tattersall's Tiara (G1) - Palaisipan
- 2022 Dane Ripper Stakes (G2) - Palaisipan
- 2018 Vo Rogue Plate (G3) - Boomsara
- 2016 B J McLachlan Stakes (G3) - Ours To Keep
