= Might and Power =

New Zealand-bred Thoroughbred racehorse

- Sire: Zabeel
- Grandsire: Sir Tristram (IRE)
- Dam: Benediction
- Damsire: Day Is Done
- Sex: Gelding
- Foaled: 6 October 1993
- Died: 11 April 2020 (aged 26)
- Country: New Zealand
- Colour: Bay/Brown
- Breeder: Windsor Park Stud
- Owner: Nick Moraitis
- Trainer: Jack Denham
- Record: 33: 15-7-1
- Earnings: $5,226,286

Major wins
- Group One; Caulfield Cup (1997); Melbourne Cup (1997); Mercedes Classic (1998); AJC Queen Elizabeth Stakes (1998); Doomben Cup (1998); Caulfield Stakes (1998); W. S. Cox Plate (1998)

Awards
- World Champion Stayer (1997); Australian Horse of the Year (1998 & 1999)

Honours
- Australian Racing Hall of Fame; New Zealand Racing Hall of Fame
- Last updated on 25 October 2009

Might and Power (6 October 1993 – 11 April 2020) was a New Zealand bred, Australian owned and trained Thoroughbred racehorse who was named Australian Horse of the Year in 1998 and 1999. As a four-year-old, Might And Power won the Caulfield and Melbourne Cups, and returned at five to become only the second horse in the history of Australian racing to win both Cups and the Cox Plate. He also won a number of other weight-for-age races in this period, including the Mercedes Classic, the AJC Queen Elizabeth Stakes, and the Doomben Cup. A strong, free-striding front-runner, he broke course records in winning the Caulfield Cup, the Doomben Cup, and the Cox Plate, and won a number of races by big margins.

== Breeding ==
Might and Power was foaled at Windsor Park Stud in New Zealand. He was by Zabeel out of the Irish mare Benediction, whose 13 foals for nine winners also included the stakeswinners Matter Of Honour (by Casual Lies) and Bastet (by Giant's Causeway) and the city winners Scud (by Dance Floor) and Miss Priority (by Kaapstad). In turn, Miss Priority (a three-quarter sister to Might And Power) produced the stakeswinners Miss Power Bird (by Mukaddamah) and Lucky Owners (by Danehill), who was a champion in Hong Kong. Benediction was named New Zealand Broodmare of the Year in 1998 and 1999.

== Racing career ==
=== Two- and three-year-old season: 1995-1997 ===
Might and Power made his debut late in his two-year-old season, and won his first race on 24 July 1996, at his third start. Spelled after one more start, he returned in the new year, and, once stepped up to 1,900 metres, won back-to-back restricted races at Canterbury. Up in grade, he finished second to the multiple Group One winner Intergaze in the Canterbury Guineas, seventh in the Rosehill Guineas, and was defeated by just over a length when fourth in the AJC Derby after suffering severe interference. Seven days later, as a short-priced favourite, he won the Frank Packer Plate by six lengths.

=== Four-year-old season: 1997-1998 ===
Might And Power resumed in the Show County Quality, over 1,200 metres (6 furlongs) and came from near the tail of the field to defeat the Caulfield Guineas winner Alfa and the stakeswinning sprinter Armidale. He then finished second to Galactic Valley in the Tramway Handicap and Quick Flick Shannon Quality and was beaten less than three lengths in the Epsom Handicap, but Brian York lost the ride to Jim Cassidy. Stepping up from 1,600 to 2,400 metres for the Caulfield Cup, Cassidy rode Might And Power and allowed him to stride freely and at the home turn he was well clear of his opposition. In winning by the extraordinary margin of 7 1/2 lengths, he broke the course record. The rest of the field was headed by the 1995 winner Doriemus.

After such an emphatic win, betting markets for the Cox Plate and the Melbourne Cup were hastily rearranged, with Might and Power being installed as a short-priced favourite for both events. His trainer, Jack Denham, who had Filante set for the Cox Plate, elected to bypass the Valley feature with Might And Power and go into the Melbourne Cup without another run. At Flemington, Might And Power was to carry 56 kilograms (8 st 11 lb) having received a penalty of three-and-a-half kilos (a modern record) for his win in the Caulfield Cup. This placed him just one kilo below weight-for-age for a four-year-old male horse at 3,200 metres, and within 1.5 kilograms of Doriemus, who had won the race in 1995. If Might And Power were successful, it would be the highest weight carried to victory by a four-year-old since Gurner's Lane in 1982.

Despite these obstacles, as well as several European stayers and tackling the extreme distance for the first time, several large bets were placed on Might And Power on the day of the race. Starting favourite, he led, and withstood three distinct waves of challenges – Crying Game at the 1,600-metre point, Linesman on the home turn, and Doriemus over the final 200 metres. After seeing off Linesman, Might and Power led by more than two lengths with 300 metres left to run, but Doriemus emerged on the outside. Edging closer and closer, Doriemus appeared likely to score with 50 metres to go, but Might And Power found again in the final strides. In the tightest of finishes, after which Greg Hall, on Doriemus, waved his whip in salute, the photo showed Might and Power had held on.

At the end of the year, Might and Power was named World Champion Stayer.

Returning in the new year, Might And Power ran third behind the Group One winning sprinters Special Dane and Al Mansour in Orr Stakes, but was beaten as favourite by the reigning Cox Plate winner, Dane Ripper, in the St George Stakes, and a minor injury forced him out of the Australian Cup (also won by Dane Ripper). Back in Sydney, Might And Power ran second to the Australian Guineas winner Gold Guru in the Ranvet Stakes, but connections were unhappy with Jim Cassidy's ride, and Brian York again took over.

Back to full fitness, and well-rated by York, Might And Power recorded fast time and defeated Gold Guru and Doriemus by five lengths in the Mercedes Classic. This was the beginning of a patch of remarkable form, where he won four weight-for-age races in a row by a combined margin of more than 22 lengths. At Randwick, three weeks later, Might and Power faced a field of six in the AJC Queen Elizabeth Stakes, which included the multiple Group One winners Juggler, Champagne, Catalan Opening, and Intergaze, but it was a one-act affair as he won by 10 1/2 lengths. Taken to Queensland, he defeated the Group One winner Summer Beau by 5 3/4 lengths in the Hollindale Cup, and beat Intergaze by just over a length and broke the course record in winning the Doomben Cup.

=== Five-year-old season: 1998-1999 ===
Might And Power's winning run came to an end when beaten on a heavy track in the Warwick Stakes, but, stepped up to 1,600 metres, defeated Juggler second-up in Chelmsford Stakes. Three weeks later, Might And Power started favourite in the George Main Stakes but faded badly in the straight. The poor run resulted from a virus, and his spring campaign appeared to be in jeopardy. Brian York was again replaced by Jim Cassidy, however, and the horse's campaign continued in Melbourne, in the Caulfield Stakes. Shane Dye led on the multiple Group One winner Tycoon Lil, but Cassidy bided his time on Might And Power, in second place, and surged to the front over the closing stages to win by just over two lengths.

Back to top form, Might And Power was installed 11/8-on favourite (approximately $1.70) for the Cox Plate. His trainer, Jack Denham, had been runner-up in the two previous editions, with Filante, and victory would give Might And Power a place in history. He would become only the second horse, after Rising Fast in 1954, to win the Cox Plate and the Caulfield and Melbourne Cups, and the first reigning Melbourne Cup winner since Phar Lap in 1931 to win the Cox Plate. As a result, nearly 40,000 racegoers packed Moonee Valley racecourse on 24 October 1998. Heading down the straight for the first time, rival jockeys pressed through on the inside in an attempt to clutter him behind other horses, but Jim Cassidy swung Might And Power four-deep on the turn out of the straight, and took over down the side of the course. Setting a strong pace, the rest of the field began to tire behind him, and Might And Power turned for home two lengths clear. AJC Derby placegetter Northern Drake loomed up strongly, at 100/1, but Might And Power held on comfortably to win by just over a length in course record time.

Two weeks later, in what would prove the last win of his career, Might And Power beat a sub-standard field by seven lengths in the VRC Queen Elizabeth Stakes. Owner Nick Moraitis was invited to run Might And Power in the Japan Cup but was unable to secure a direct flight, and elected to send the horse for a spell.

In the new year, Might And Power bowed a tendon in training, and was off the scene for 18 months.

=== Six- and seven-year-old season: 1999-2001 ===
Unraced at six, Might And Power returned in September 2000 at age seven but failed to beat a runner home in his two starts and was quickly retired. He made numerous public appearances and resided at Living Legends in Woodlands Historic Park, Greenvale, Victoria.

== Death and legacy ==
Might and Power died on 11 April 2020 after emergency surgery for colic.

In 2021 the Caulfield Stakes, which he won in 1998, became known as the Might and Power in his honour.

== Race record ==
1995–96 season as a two-year-old
Result	Date	Race	Venue	Group	Distance	Weight (kg)	Jockey	Winner/2nd
4th	12 Jun 1996	2yo Hcp Colts & Geldings	Canterbury	NA	1290 m	53.5	K. Forrester	1st – Imprison
5th	14 Jul 1996	2yo Hcp Restricted	Rosehill	NA	1300 m	54	J. Marshall	1st – Spy Cracker
Won	24 Jul 1996	2yo Hcp Restricted	Randwick	NA	1400 m	53.5	J. Marshall	2nd – Torbellino

1996–97 season as a three-year-old
Result	Date	Race	Venue	Group	Distance	Weight (kg)	Jockey	Winner/2nd
2nd	02 Aug 1996	3yo Hcp Restricted	Rosehill	NA	1500 m	55	J. Marshall	1st – Spy Cracker
12th	11 Jan 1997	3yo Hcp Restricted	Rosehill	NA	1350 m	51	J. Morris	1st – Purist
2nd	26 Jan 1997	3yo Hcp Restricted	Randwick	NA	1800 m	54.5	J. Cassidy	1st – Sir Markie
Won	09 Feb 1997	3yo & Up Hcp Restricted	Canterbury	NA	1900 m	55.5	J. Cassidy	2nd – Myban Star
Won	16 Feb 1997	3yo & Up Hcp Restricted	Canterbury	NA	1900 m	54	J. Cassidy	2nd – Nimzo Indian
2nd	01 Mar 1997	Canterbury Guineas	Rosehill	G1	1800 m	55.5	J. Cassidy	1st – Intergaze
7th	15 Mar 1997	Rosehill Guineas	Rosehill	G1	2000 m	55.5	J. Cassidy	1st – Tarnpir Lane
4th	29 Mar 1997	Australian Derby	Randwick	G1	2400 m	55.5	B. York	1st – Ebony Grosve
Won	05 Apr 1997	Frank Packer Plate	Randwick	G3	2000 m	54	B. York	2nd – Sakti

1997–98 season as a four-year-old
Result	Date	Race	Venue	Group	Distance	Weight (kg)	Jockey	Winner/2nd
Won	23 Aug 1997	Show County Quality Handicap	Warwick Farm	LR	1200 m	53	B. York	2nd – Alfa
2nd	06 Sep 1997	Tramway Stakes	Randwick	G3	1400 m	54.5	B. York	1st – Galactic Valley
2nd	20 Sep 1997	Shannon Stakes	Rosehill	G3	1500 m	55.5	B. York	1st – Quick Flick
8th	04 Oct 1997	Epsom Handicap	Randwick	G1	1600 m	54	B. York	1st – Iron Horse
Won	18 Oct 1997	Caulfield Cup	Caulfield	G1	2400 m	52.5	J. Cassidy	2nd – Doriemus
Won	04 Nov 1997	Melbourne Cup	Flemington	G1	3200 m	56	J. Cassidy	2nd – Doriemus
3rd	14 Feb 1998	C F Orr Stakes	Caulfield	G1	1400 m	57	J. Cassidy	1st – Special Dane
2nd	28 Feb 1998	St George Stakes	Caulfield	G2	1800 m	57	J. Cassidy	1st – Dane Ripper
2nd	21 Mar 1998	Ranvet Stakes	Rosehill	G1	2000 m	57	J. Cassidy	1st – Gold Guru
Won	04 Apr 1998	Mercedes Classic	Rosehill	G1	2400 m	57	B. York	2nd – Gold Guru
Won	25 Apr 1998	AJC Queen Elizabeth Stakes	Randwick	G1	2000 m	57	B. York	2nd – Champagne
Won	13 May 1998	Hollindale Stakes	Gold Coast	G2	1800 m	57	B. York	2nd – Summer Beau
Won	23 May 1998	Doomben Cup	Doomben	G1	2020 m	57	B. York	2nd – Intergaze

1998–99 season as a five-year-old
Result	Date	Race	Venue	Group	Distance	Weight (kg)	Jockey	Winner/2nd
4th	22 Aug 1998	Warwick Stakes	Warwick Farm	G2	1400 m	58	B. York	1st – What Can I Say
Won	05 Sep 1998	Chelmsford Stakes	Randwick	G2	1600 m	58	B. York	2nd – Juggler
7th	26 Sep 1998	George Main Stakes	Randwick	G1	1600 m	58	B. York	1st – Dracula
Won	10 Oct 1998	Yalumba Stakes	Caulfield	G1	2000 m	58	J. Cassidy	2nd – Tycoon Lil
Won	24 Oct 1998	W. S. Cox Plate	Moonee Valley	G1	2040 m	58	J. Cassidy	2nd – Northern Drake
Won	07 Nov 1998	VRC Queen Elizabeth Stakes	Flemington	G2	2500 m	60	J. Cassidy	2nd – Oregon Star

1999–2000 season as a six-year-old
Result	Race
Nil	Might and Power was unraced as a six-year-old

2000–01 season as a seven-year-old
Result	Date	Race	Venue	Group	Distance	Weight (kg)	Jockey	Winner/2nd
11th	02 Sep 2000	Tramway Stakes	Rosehill	G3	1350 m	60	J. Cassidy	1st – Mr Innocent
15th	14 Sep 2000	Shannon Stakes	Rosehill	G2	1500 m	60	J. Cassidy	1st – Al Mansour

== Pedigree ==
Pedigree of Might and Power (NZ)
Sire Zabeel (NZ) 1986	Sir Tristram (Ire); 1971	Sir Ivor (USA); 1965	Sir Gaylord (USA)
Sire Zabeel (NZ) 1986	Sir Tristram (Ire); 1971	Sir Ivor (USA); 1965	Attica (USA)
Sire Zabeel (NZ) 1986	Sir Tristram (Ire); 1971	Isolt (USA); 1961	Round Table (USA)
Sire Zabeel (NZ) 1986	Sir Tristram (Ire); 1971	Isolt (USA); 1961	All My Eye (GB)
Sire Zabeel (NZ) 1986	Lady Giselle (Fr); 1982	Nureyev (USA); 1977	Northern Dancer (Can)
Sire Zabeel (NZ) 1986	Lady Giselle (Fr); 1982	Nureyev (USA); 1977	Special (USA)
Sire Zabeel (NZ) 1986	Lady Giselle (Fr); 1982	Valderna (Fr); 1972	Val de Loir (Fr)
Sire Zabeel (NZ) 1986	Lady Giselle (Fr); 1982	Valderna (Fr); 1972	Derna (Fr)
Dam Benediction (Ire) 1985	Day Is Done (Ire); 1979	Artaius (USA); 1974	Round Table (USA)
Dam Benediction (Ire) 1985	Day Is Done (Ire); 1979	Artaius (USA); 1974	Stylish Pattern (USA)
Dam Benediction (Ire) 1985	Day Is Done (Ire); 1979	Headin' Home (Ire); 1971	Habitat (USA)
Dam Benediction (Ire) 1985	Day Is Done (Ire); 1979	Headin' Home (Ire); 1971	Miss Doree (GB)
Dam Benediction (Ire) 1985	Cathedra (GB); 1976	So Blessed (GB); 1965	Princely Gift (GB)
Dam Benediction (Ire) 1985	Cathedra (GB); 1976	So Blessed (GB); 1965	Lavant (GB)
Dam Benediction (Ire) 1985	Cathedra (GB); 1976	Collyria (GB); 1956	Arctic Prince (GB)
Dam Benediction (Ire) 1985	Cathedra (GB); 1976	Collyria (GB); 1956	Eyewash (GB) (Family: 6-e)

== See also ==
- Australian Champion Racehorse of the Year
- List of racehorses
- List of Melbourne Cup winners
