= Sweet itch =

Skin disease of equines

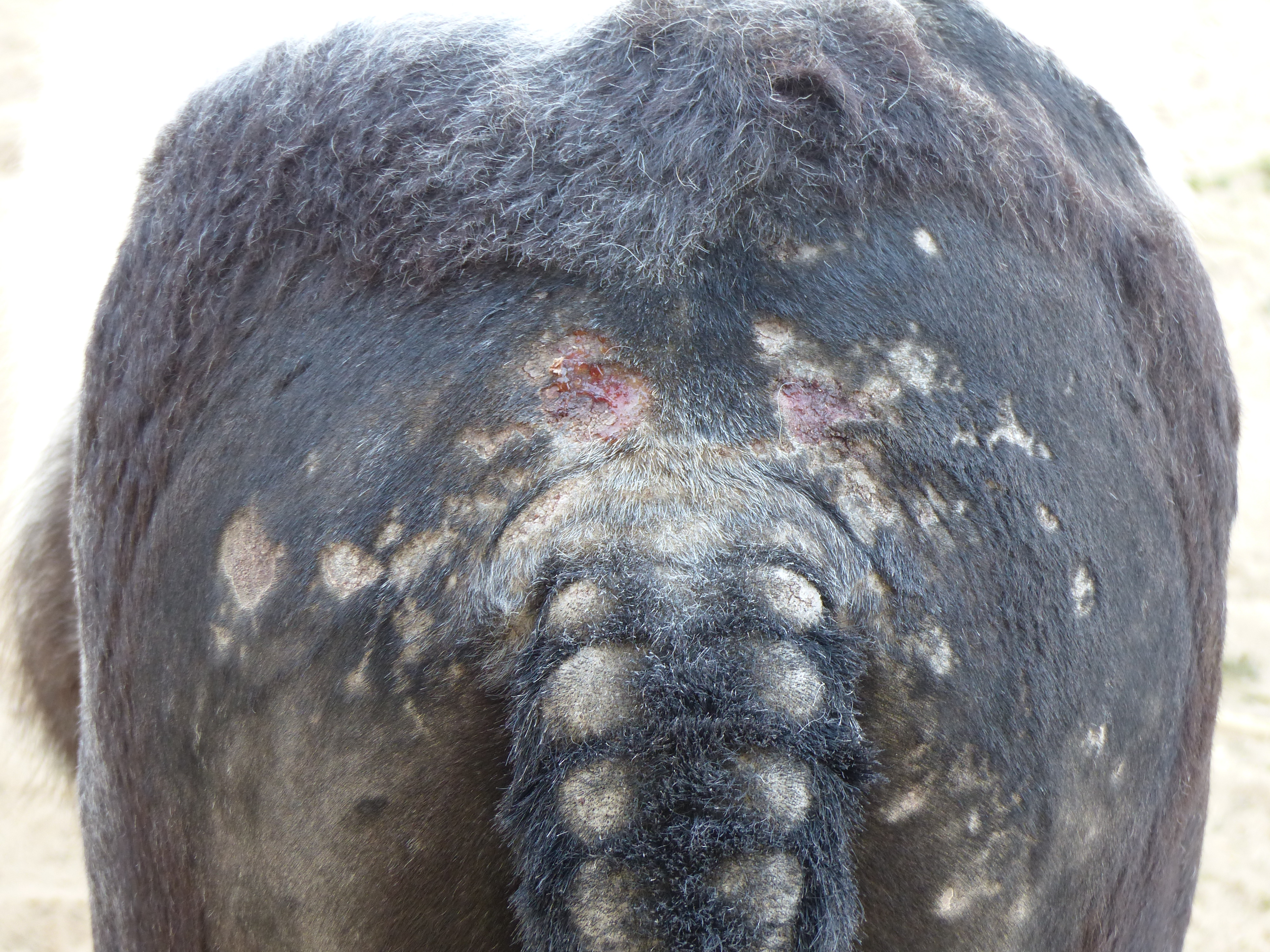
Sweet itch sores on a Tunisian pony

Also known as Queensland itch, seasonal recurrent dermatitis (SSRD), summer itch or more technically, Culicoides hypersensitivity.

Sweet itch is a medical condition in equines caused by an allergic response to the bites of Culicoides midges. It may be found in horses and ponies, especially in the warmer regions. It may also occur, too, in other equines. It is also found in Canada, Australia, the US and many other parts of the world.

== Causes ==
A hypersensitivity reaction to specific allergens (protein molecules causing an extreme immune response in sensitised individuals) in the saliva of Culicoides midges. There are multiple allergens involved, although some works claim that the larger proteins (of molecular weight 65kDa) are the most important. These allergens appear to be cross-reactive across many species of Culicoides - i.e. many different varieties of midges produce similar allergens, giving the same effects upon horses.

The hypersensitivity response is mediated by IgE, an antibody produced by the horse's immune system which binds the allergens, causing a cascade production of histamine and cytokines which make the horse's skin inflamed and itchy. Of these, histamine appears the most important in the initial phase of reaction.

== Symptoms ==
- The allergic reaction develops at the site where the insects feed
- The majority of affected horses show skin lesions affecting the mane and tail and dorsal midline.
- Ventral midline symptoms may also occur.
- Lesions around the ears and head are also common.
- These lesions are characterised by intense pruritus (itching), which results in rubbing and considerable self-trauma. This damage is caused by the horse violently rubbing itself against objects, and causes:
  - broken hairs
  - broken and sometimes bleeding skin
  - bald patches.
- Secondary infections may result

== Treatment and prevention ==
Few treatments are fully efficacious once lesions have appeared. The only effective form of treatment is preventative - i.e. prevent further insect bites - so these techniques will also be discussed here. Treatments generally fall into one of the following categories:

- Insecticides and repellents: These may be applied to the horse or its environment. The most commonly used and effective are permethrins. and benzyl benzoate Citronella has been used, with variable effect. Some sources advocate draining of any stagnant water or pools, to reduce the local breeding potential of the insects. Midge numbers are often larger near water sources, for example ponds, bogs, and slow moving water. Moving the horse away from these areas may help to prevent further problems.
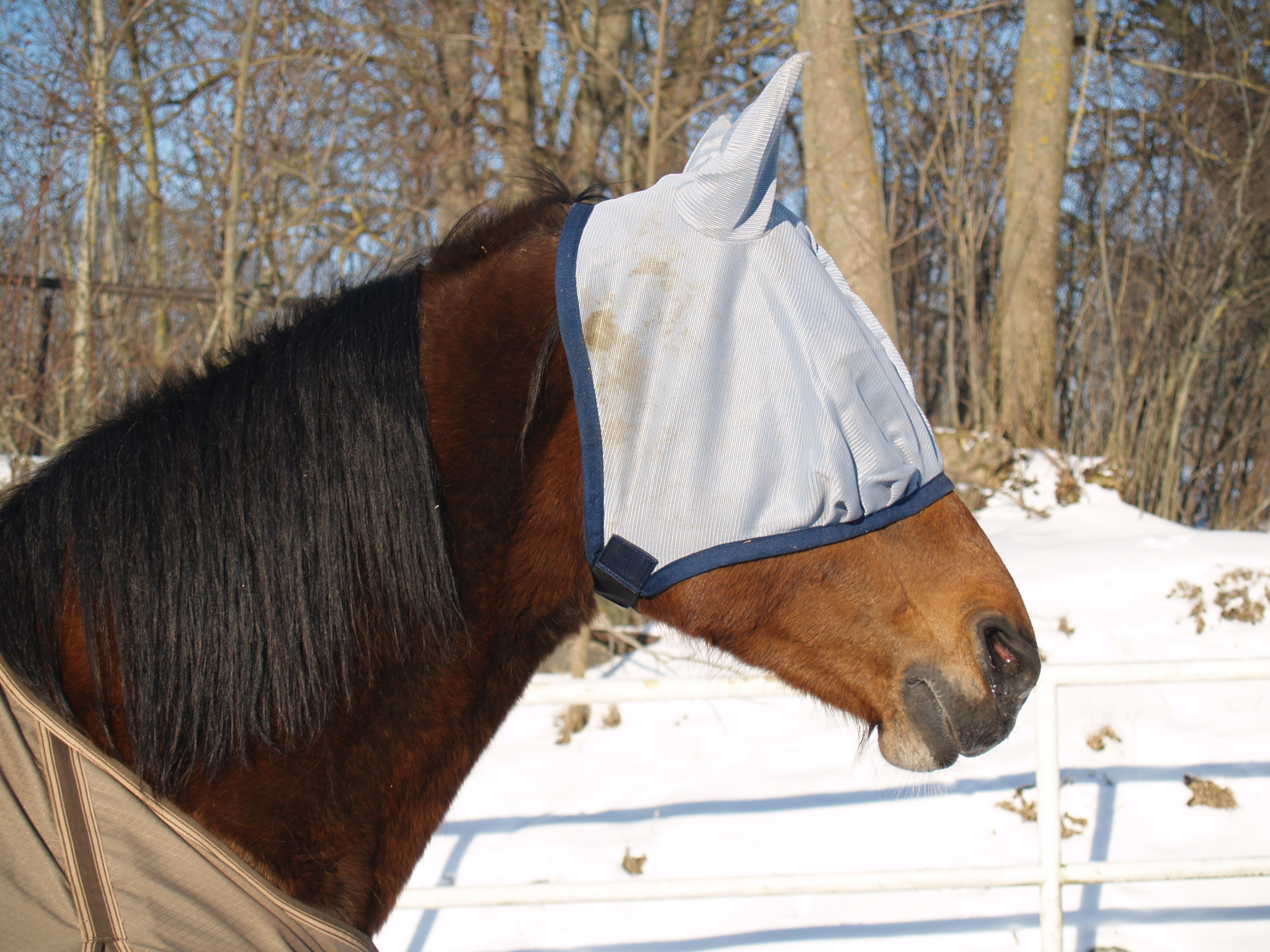
  Fly mask
- Barrier techniques: Rugs etc., that prevent flies and midges settling on the animal's skin to bite. These include "Boett Rugs" and fly masks. In addition, thin screens may be placed over stable doors and windows to exclude biting insects. Stabling the horse at times of day when the midges are most prevalent is also quite effective.
- Immunotherapy: A wide variety immunotherapy and desensitisation protocols have been trialled in attempts to reduce or modify the immune response, with considerable success rates. More research is ongoing, and first products are already marketed.
- Nutritional supplements: Various supplements may be effective in individuals, including fatty acid supplementation and linseed oil. However, although owners perceived an improvement, this was not bourne out by objective statistical analysis.
- Symptomatic control: Control of symptoms to some degree can be achieved with antihistamines (especially hydroxyzine, and with corticosteroids, although the potential side effects (e.g. laminitis, immune suppression) make this a less preferred option. In addition, antibiotics may be required to manage any secondary infection.
- Alternative medicines: A wide variety of herbal, homeopathic and other alternative remedies have been suggested. Among the natural remedies suggested are sulfur, wild geranium (as the base for a shampoo), lavender oil, aloe vera (to reduce the itching).

Overall, the wide variety of treatments proposed leads to the conclusion that no one method is universally effective.

== See also ==
- Ceratopogonidae (The family of which Culicoides is a member)
- Culicoides imicola (species of midge)
- Culicoides impunctatus (species of midge)
- Veterinary parasitology
