= Jack Denham =

Australian horse trainer

- Born: 23 August 1924; Campsie, New South Wales, Australia
- Died: 14 December 2009 (aged 85); Sydney, Australia
- Occupation: Horse trainer

Jack Denham (24 August 1924 – 14 December 2009) was a leading Australian horse trainer and businessman.

A member of a Sydney training dynasty, Denham first rode as a jockey for his brother, and then took out his own training licence in 1948.

Denham's training career took off when he became a trainer for Stan Fox at Nebo Lodge, a position he held for 10 years, training over 1,000 winners. For six successive years, from 1971 to 1976, he was runner-up in the Sydney trainers’ premiership table. He was to win the premiership later in 1990–91 and 1992–93.

From 1980 onwards Denham was closely associated with owners Geoff and Beryl White, for whom he won a Golden Slipper with Marscay, an Epsom Handicap, Yalumba Stakes and other group races with Filante, and an Australian Guineas and AJC Oaks with Triscay. His greatest triumphs came in 1997 and 1998 when the Denham trained Might and Power took out the Melbourne Cup, Caulfield Cup and Cox Plate.

On 14 December 2009, Jack Denham died at the age of 85 after a long illness.
