= Nothin' Leica Dane =

Australian-bred Thoroughbred racehorse

- Sire: Danehill (USA)
- Grandsire: Danzig (USA)
- Dam: Leica Pretender (NZ)
- Damsire: Sir Tristram (IRE)
- Sex: Stallion
- Foaled: 29 October 1992
- Died: 21 October 2018 (aged 25)
- Country: Australia
- Colour: Brown
- Breeder: Arrowfield Stud
- Owner: Dalton Hodge Ecurie
- Trainer: Gai Waterhouse
- Record: 26-6:5:3
- Earnings: $1,771,016

Major wins
- Spring Champion Stakes (1995); Norman Robinson Stakes (1995); Victoria Derby (1995); Hobartville Stakes (1996)
- Last updated on 29 October 2018

Nothin' Leica Dane was a notable Australian bred Thoroughbred racehorse who won the 1995 Victoria Derby and three days later finished second in the Melbourne Cup as a three-year-old.

He also sired the winners of over $16 million in prizemoney with his best offspring headed by Group I winners Hot Danish (All Aged Stakes, Doomben 10,000) and Cinque Cento (Doomben Cup).

Nothin' Leica Dane died in 2018, aged 26 years.
