= Jezabeel =

New Zealand-bred Thoroughbred racehorse

- Sire: Zabeel
- Grandsire: Sir Tristram
- Dam: Passefleur
- Damsire: Vice Regal
- Sex: Mare
- Foaled: 2 November 1992
- Died: 22 September 2017 (aged 24)
- Country: New Zealand
- Colour: Brown
- Breeder: J. Broome
- Owner: A. K. Burr, et al.
- Trainer: Brian Jenkins

Major wins
- Auckland Cup (1998); Melbourne Cup (1998)

Jezabeel (2 November 1992 – 22 September 2017) was a top New Zealand thoroughbred racehorse who won the 1998 Melbourne Cup.

In April 1995, as a 2 year old, she won the listed 1600m Champagne Stakes at Ellerslie Racecourse. Later that year she went to Flemington but was last of seven in a 3YO fillies race.

In December 1997 she was second to Paddy O’Riley in the Manawatu Cup. On New Years Day 1998 she won the Auckland Cup, ridden by then apprentice jockey Opie Bosson, beating Aerosmith by a short neck with North Lady third.

Jezabeel is the only horse to have won both the Melbourne Cup and the Auckland Cup.

Jezabeel was ridden by Chris Munce in the Melbourne Cup. She and Champagne delivered sweet revenge when fighting out the finish of the Melbourne Cup. The race provided a turn of fortune after both mares had suffered interference-caused by jockey Ray Cochrane on Taufan's Melody in the Caulfield Cup.

The Melbourne Cup victory was her last race. She won seven races in her career.

== See also ==
- Thoroughbred racing in New Zealand
- Thoroughbred racing in Australia
