= Caulfield Stakes =

Melbourne Racing Club Group 1 Thoroughbred horse race

The Might and Power registered as the Caulfield Stakes
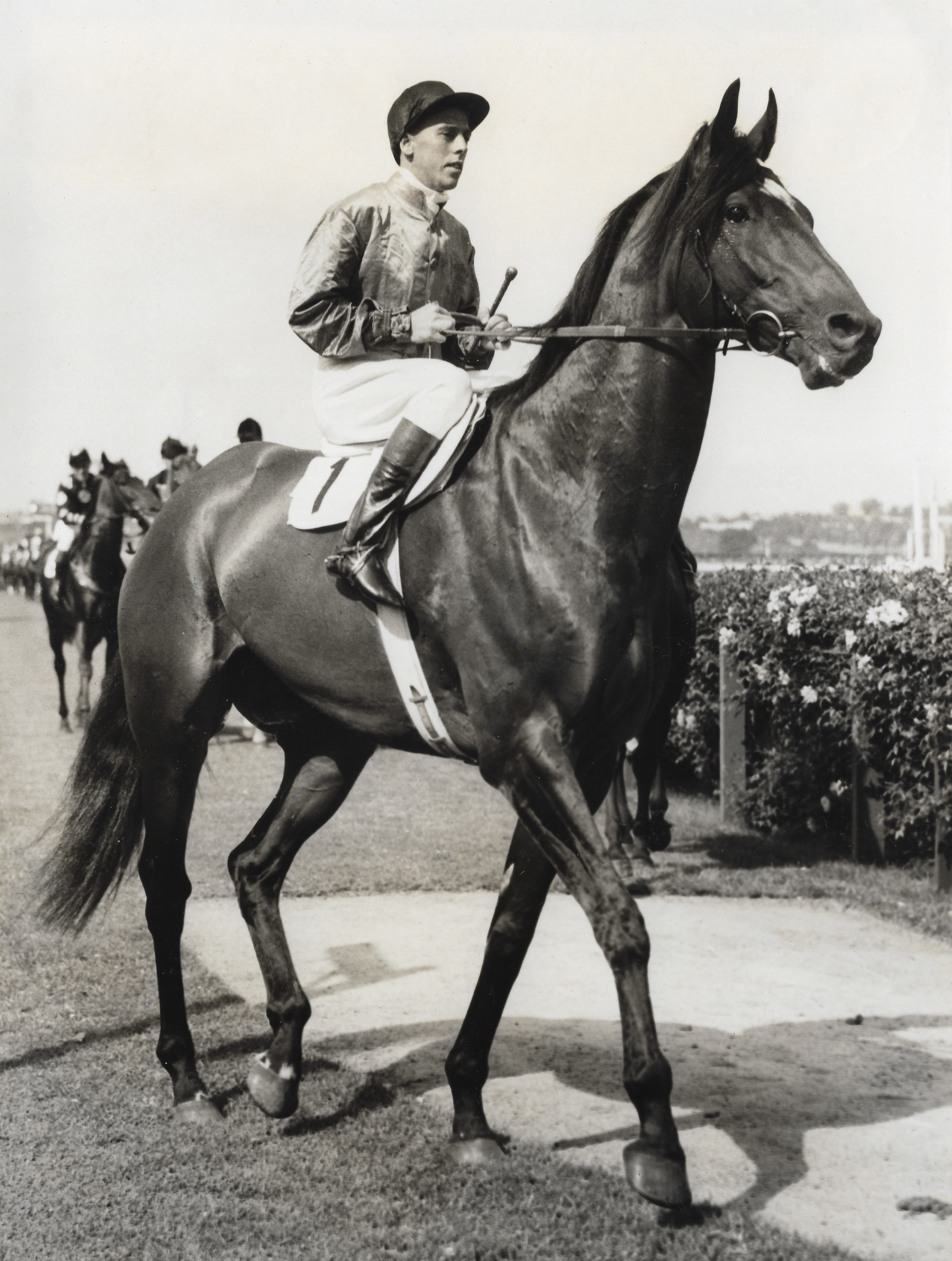
- Bernborough, 1946 winner
- Class: Group 1
- Location: Caulfield Racecourse; Melbourne, Australia
- Inaugurated: 1886
- Race type: Thoroughbred - Flat racing
- Sponsor: Sportsbet (2024-26)
- Website: www.melbourneracingclub.net.au

Race information
- Distance: 2,000 metres
- Surface: Turf
- Track: Left-handed
- Qualification: Three year olds and older that are not maidens
- Weight: Weight for Age
- Purse: $1,000,000 (2026)
- Bonuses: Winner exempt from ballot in the Caulfield Cup

The Might and Power, registered as the Caulfield Stakes is a Melbourne Racing Club Group 1 Thoroughbred horse race run under weight-for-age conditions, for three-year-olds and upwards, run over a distance of 2,000 metres at Caulfield Racecourse, Melbourne, Australia.

== History ==
The race is held annually in October on Caulfield Guineas day, the first day of the MRC Spring Carnival. The conditions of the race in regard to distance and WFA is similar to the W. S. Cox Plate, held a fortnight after the Caulfield Stakes, and many Cox Plate contenders will use this race as a preparatory race.

During World War II the race was run at Flemington Racecourse.

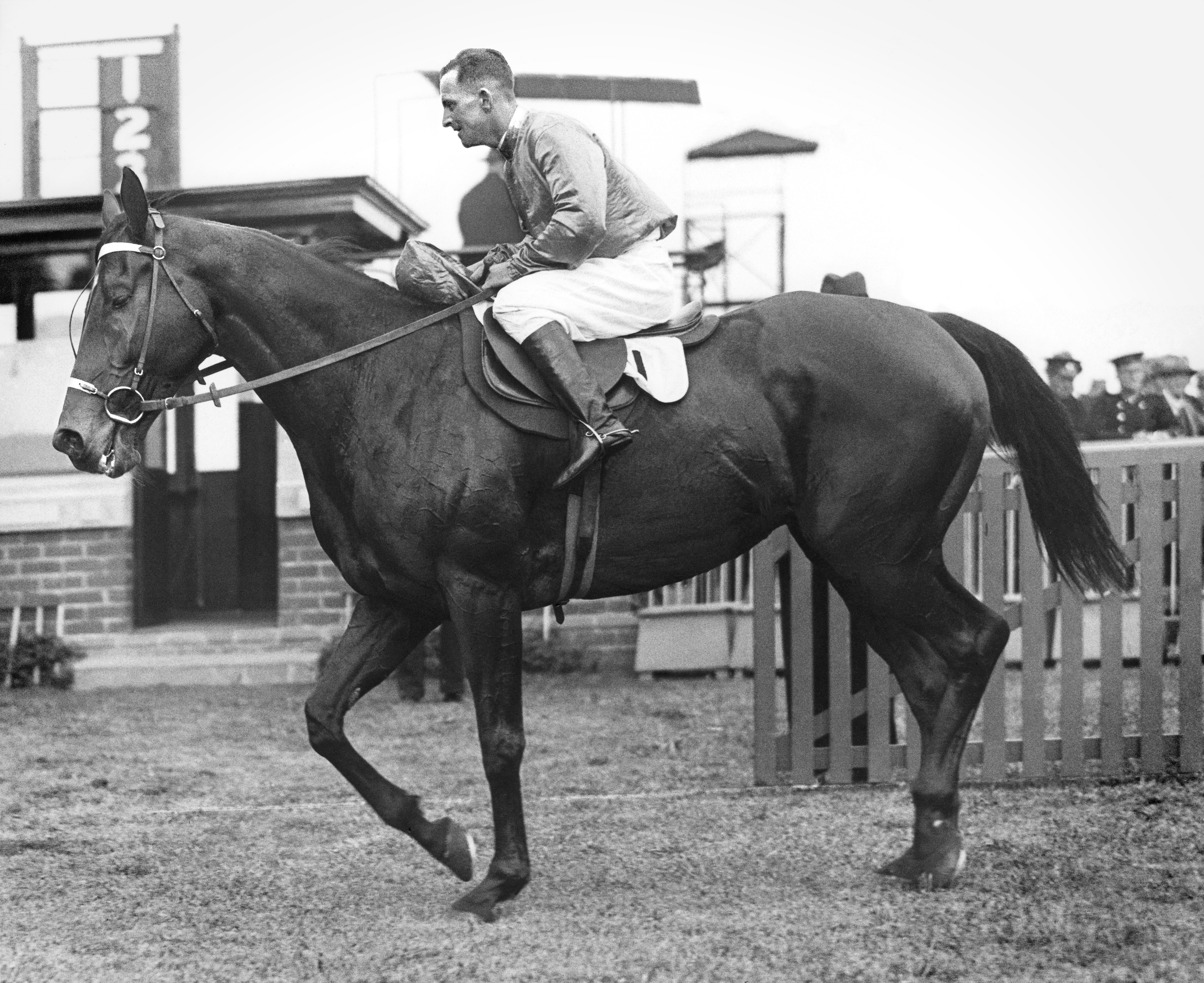
Amounis, 1930 winner

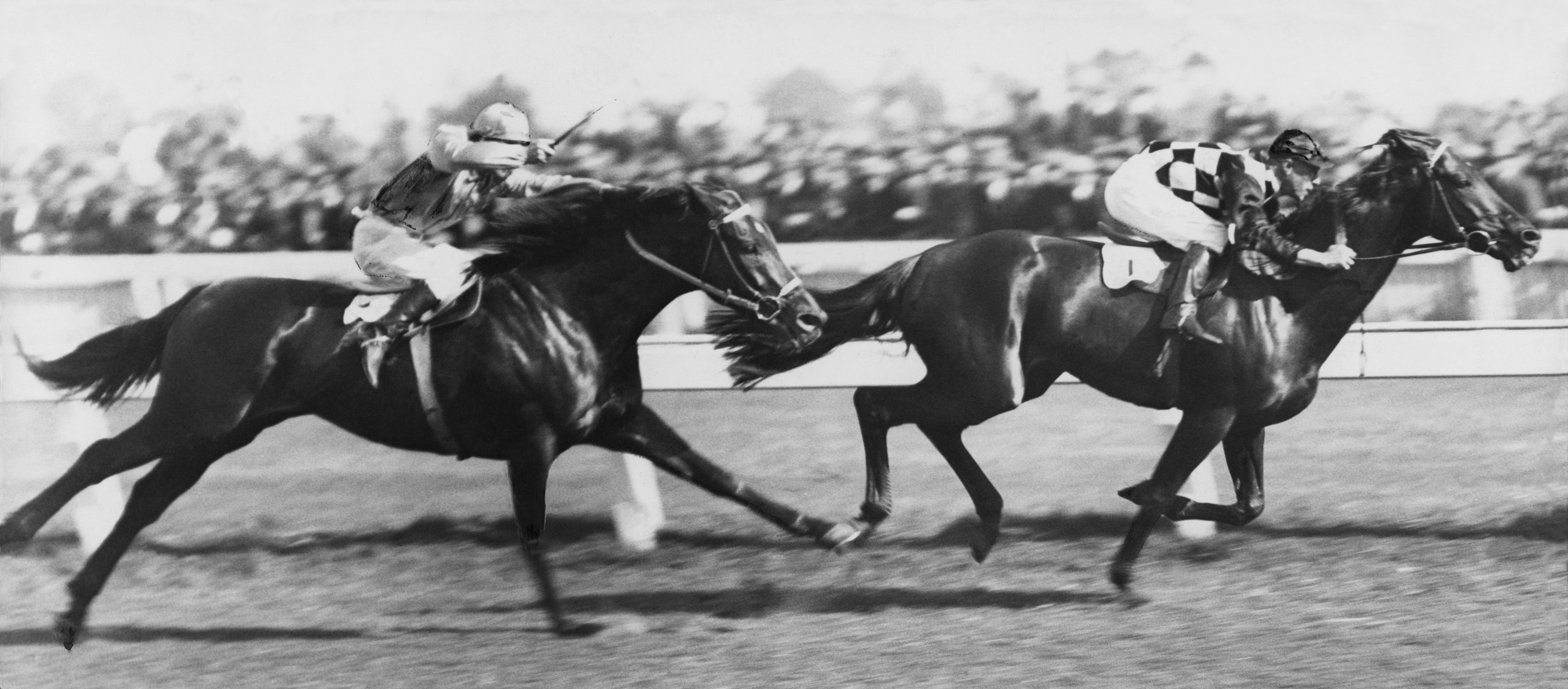
Gothic, 1928 winner

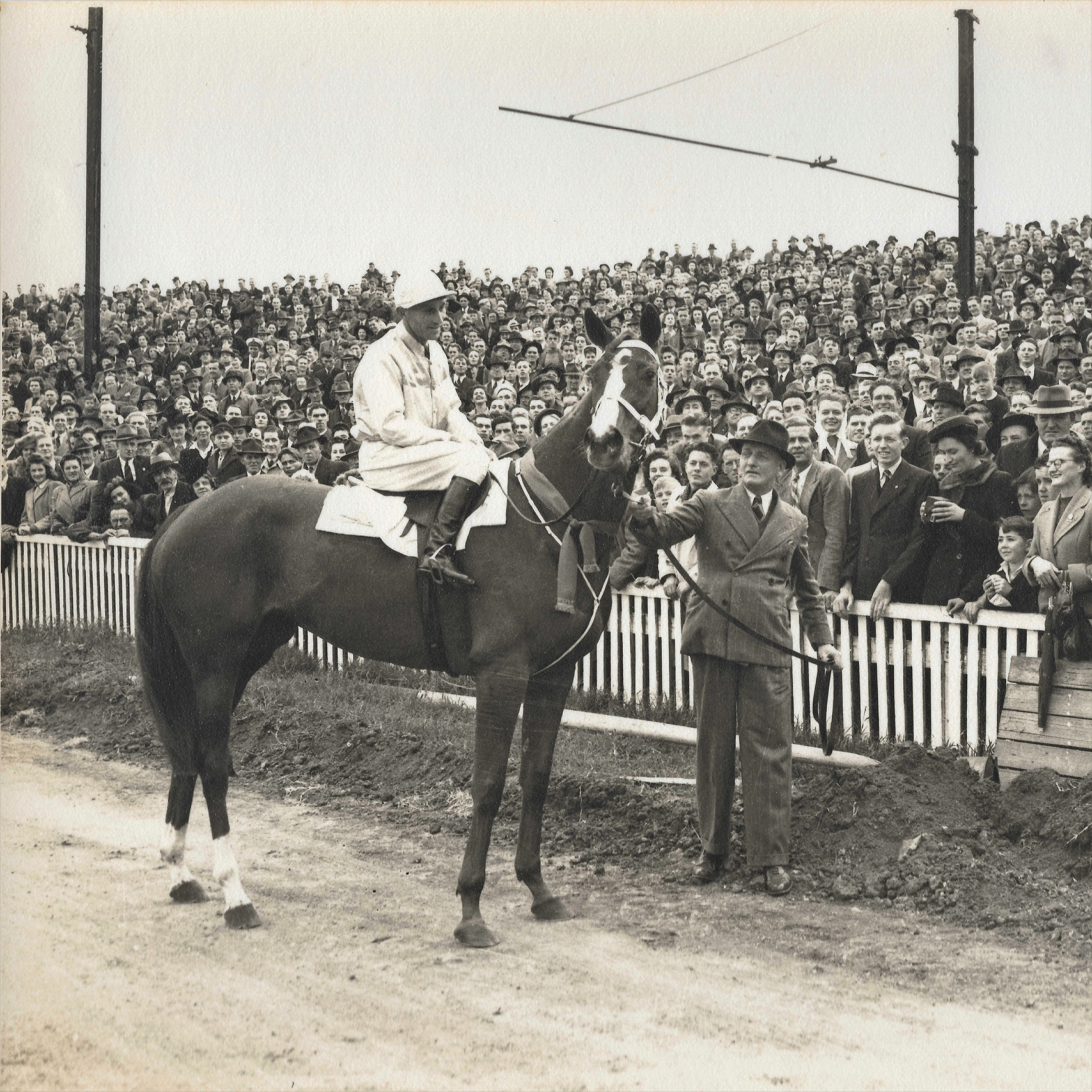
Tranquil Star, 1942 winner

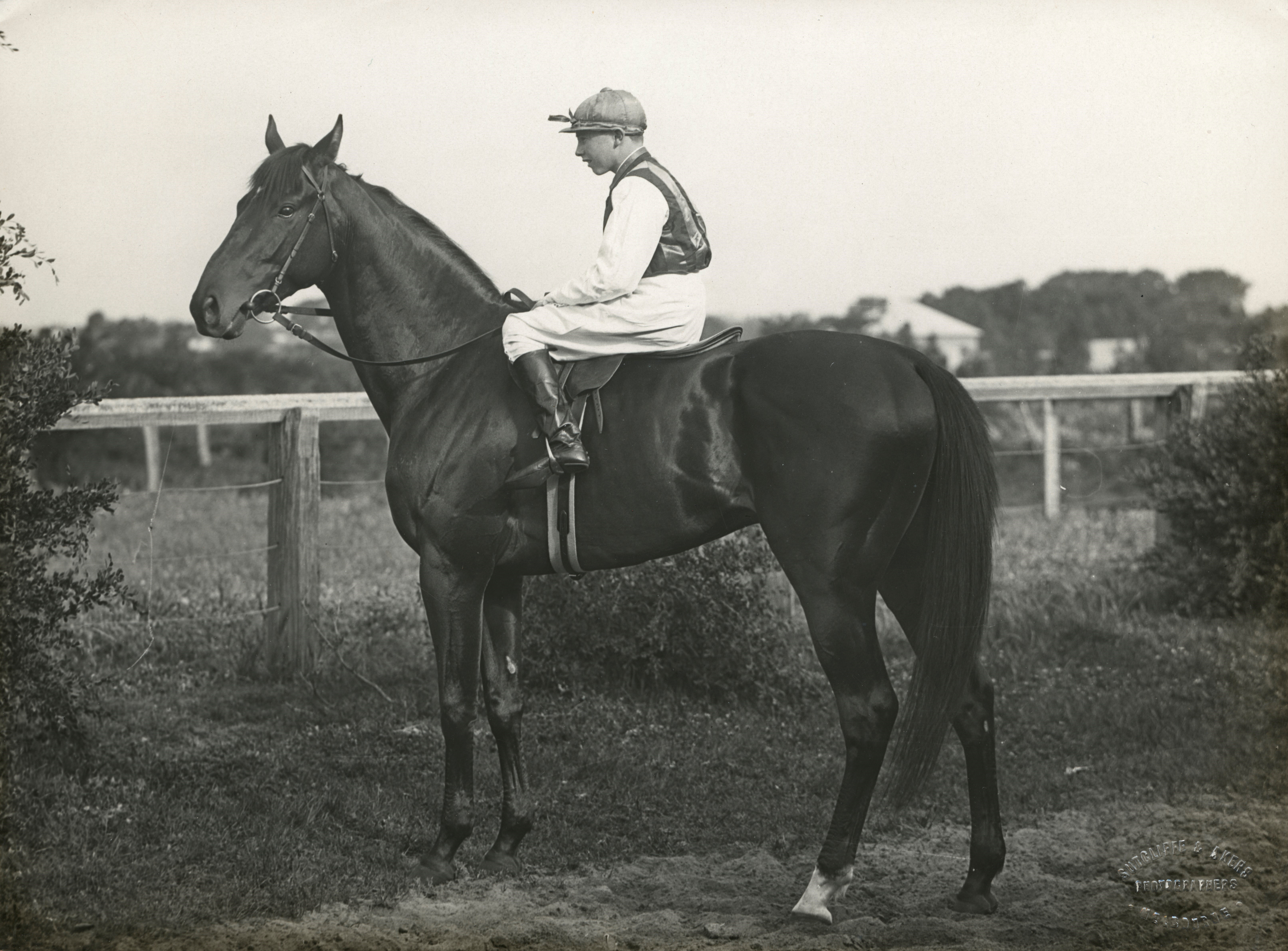
1916 winner – Lavendo

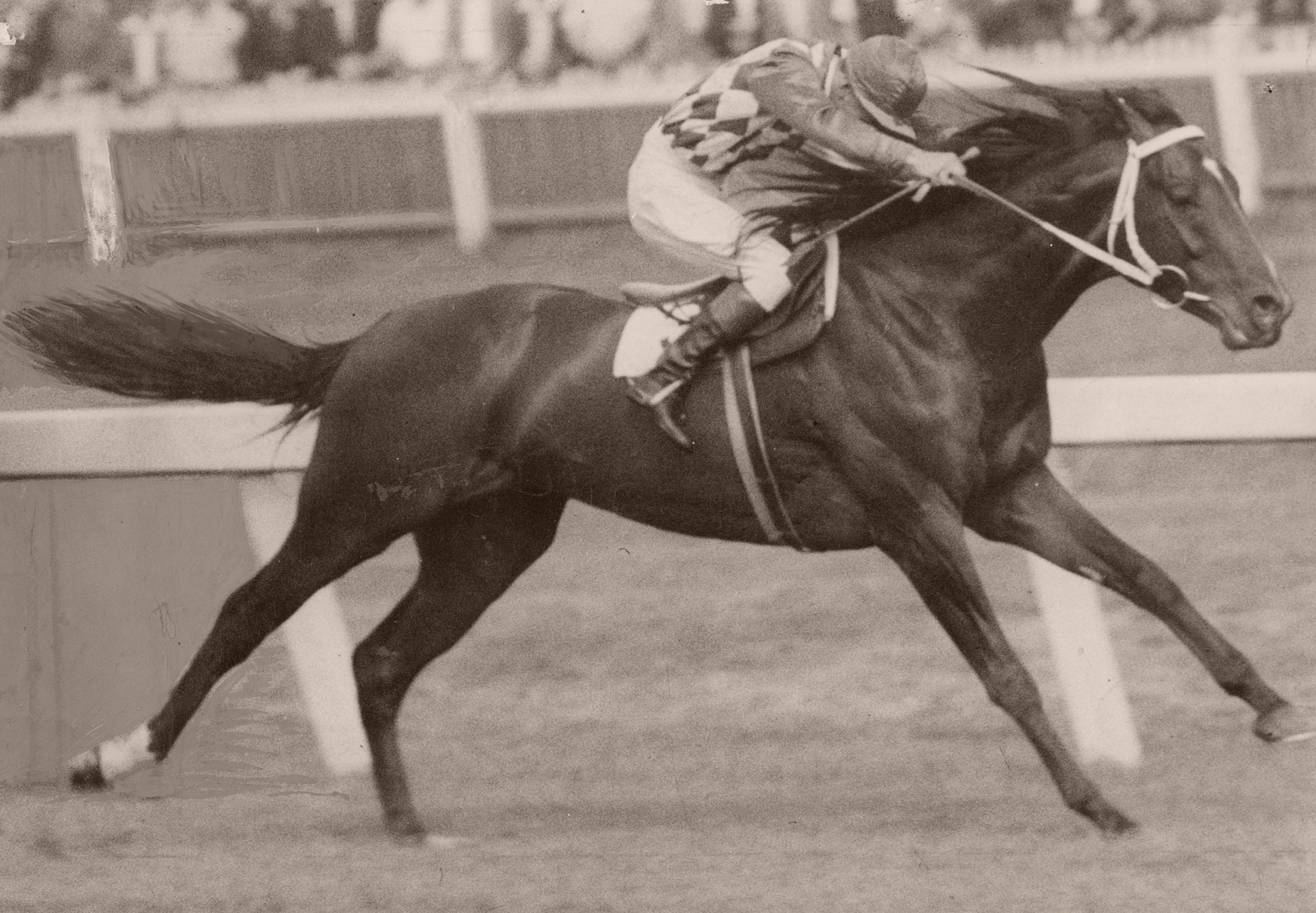
Comic Court, 1950 winner

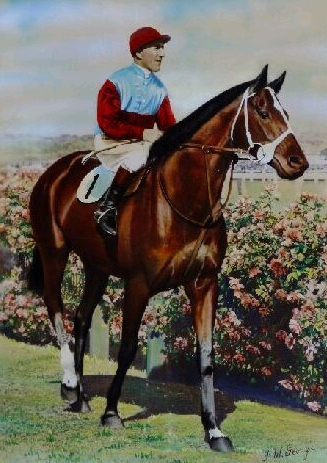
Lucrative, 1941 winner

The 2016 edition of the race attracted only three entries, the smallest ever G1 race in Australia with champion mare Winx scaring off potential rivals. In 2021 the race was renamed The Might and Power to honour the 1997 Caulfield Cup and Melbourne Cup winner who won this race back in 1998.

Only two horses have managed to claim the race on more than one occasion since 1966, reflecting the difficulty in winning the time honoured event. They were Kingston Town in 1981/82, then 20 years later Lonhro in 2002/03, both champions in their own right.

=== Name ===
- 1886–1996 - Caulfield Stakes
- 1997–2010 - Yalumba Stakes
- 2011–2015 - Caulfield Stakes
- 2016–2019 - Ladbrokes Stakes
- 2020 - Neds Stakes
- 2021 onwards - Neds Might and Power Stakes

=== Distance ===
- 1886–1887 - 1 1/8 miles (~1800 metres)
- 1888 - 1 1/4 miles (~2000 metres)
- 1889–1967 - 1 1/8 miles (~1800 metres)
- 1968–1971 - 1 1/4 miles (~2000 metres)
- 1972 onwards - 2000 metres

=== Grade ===
- 1886–1978 - Principal Race
- 1979 onwards - Group 1

=== Double winners ===
Thoroughbreds that have won the Caulfield Stakes – W. S. Cox Plate double:

- Tranquil Star (1942), Rising Fast (1954), Kingston Town (1981-2), Bonecrusher (1986), Might and Power (1998), Northerly (2001), So You Think (2010), Ocean Park (2012), Winx (2016)

Thoroughbreds that have won the Caulfield Stakes – Caulfield Cup double:

- Eurythmic (1920), High Syce (1929), Amounis (1930), Tranquil Star (1942), Rising Fast (1954), Redcraze (1956), Sometime (1963), How Now (1976), Mighty Kingdom (1979), Sydeston (1990)

== 1922 racebook ==
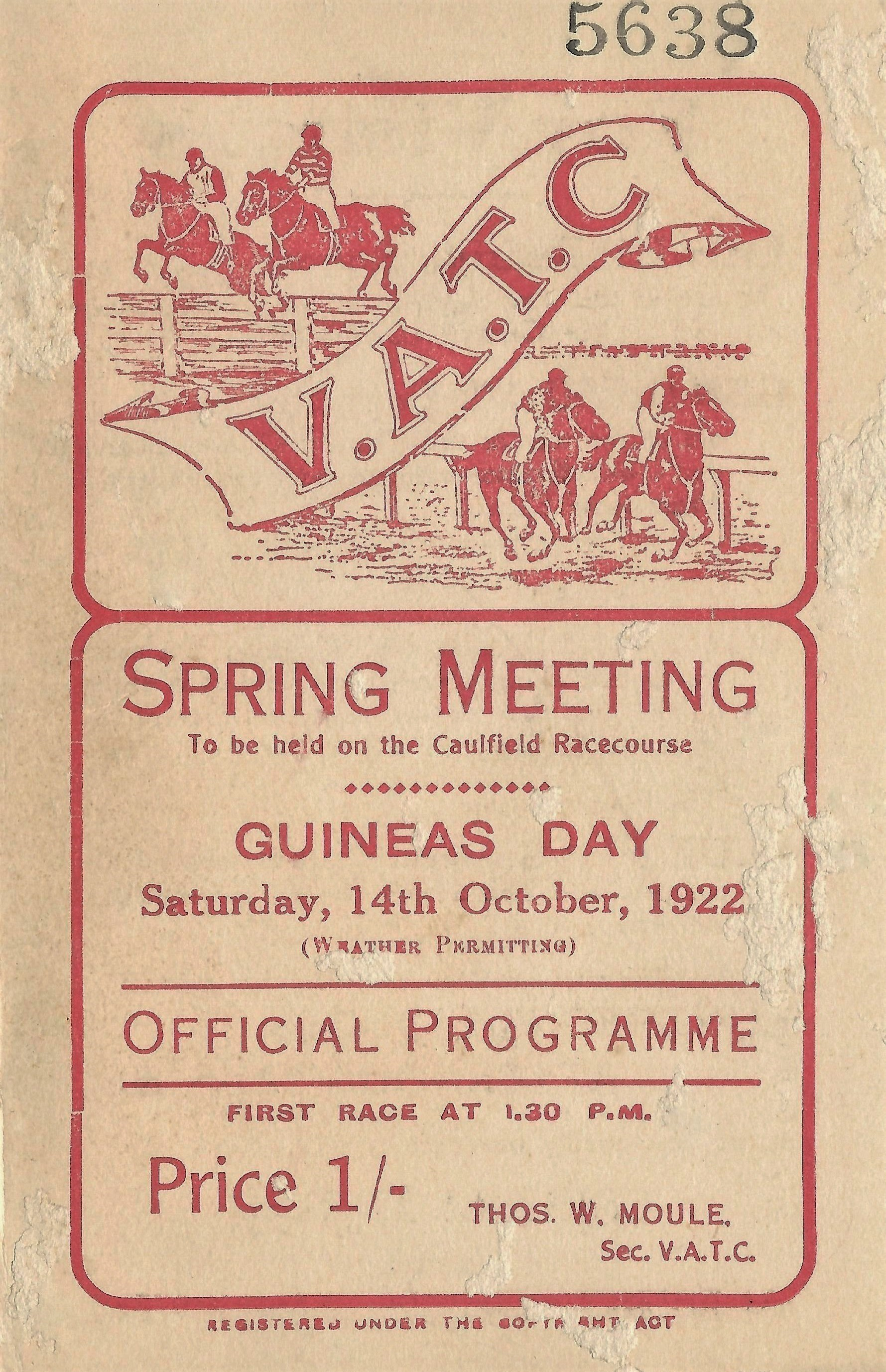
1922 VATC Caulfield Stakes racebook front cover

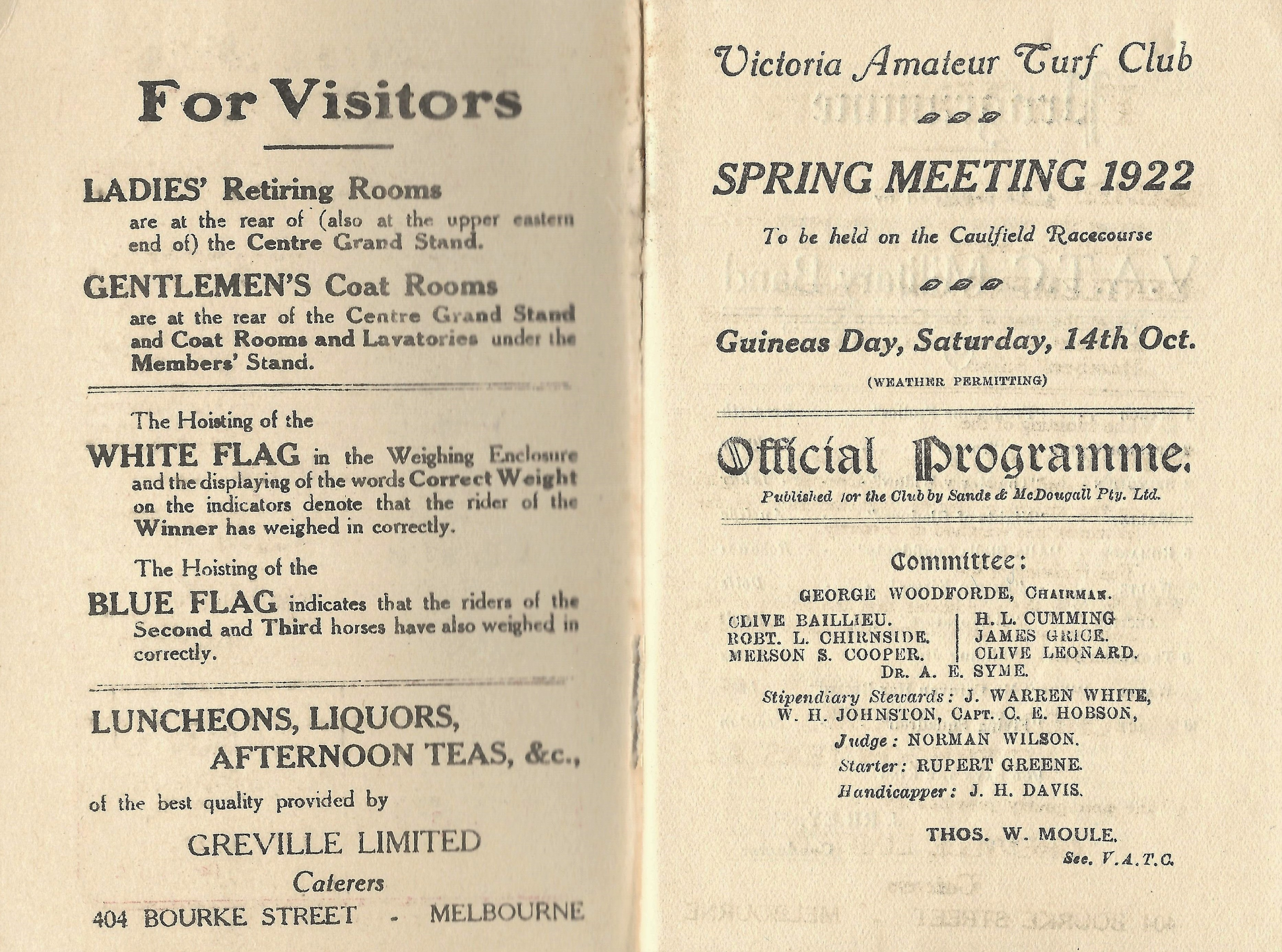
1922 VATC Caulfield Stakes officials & visitor notices

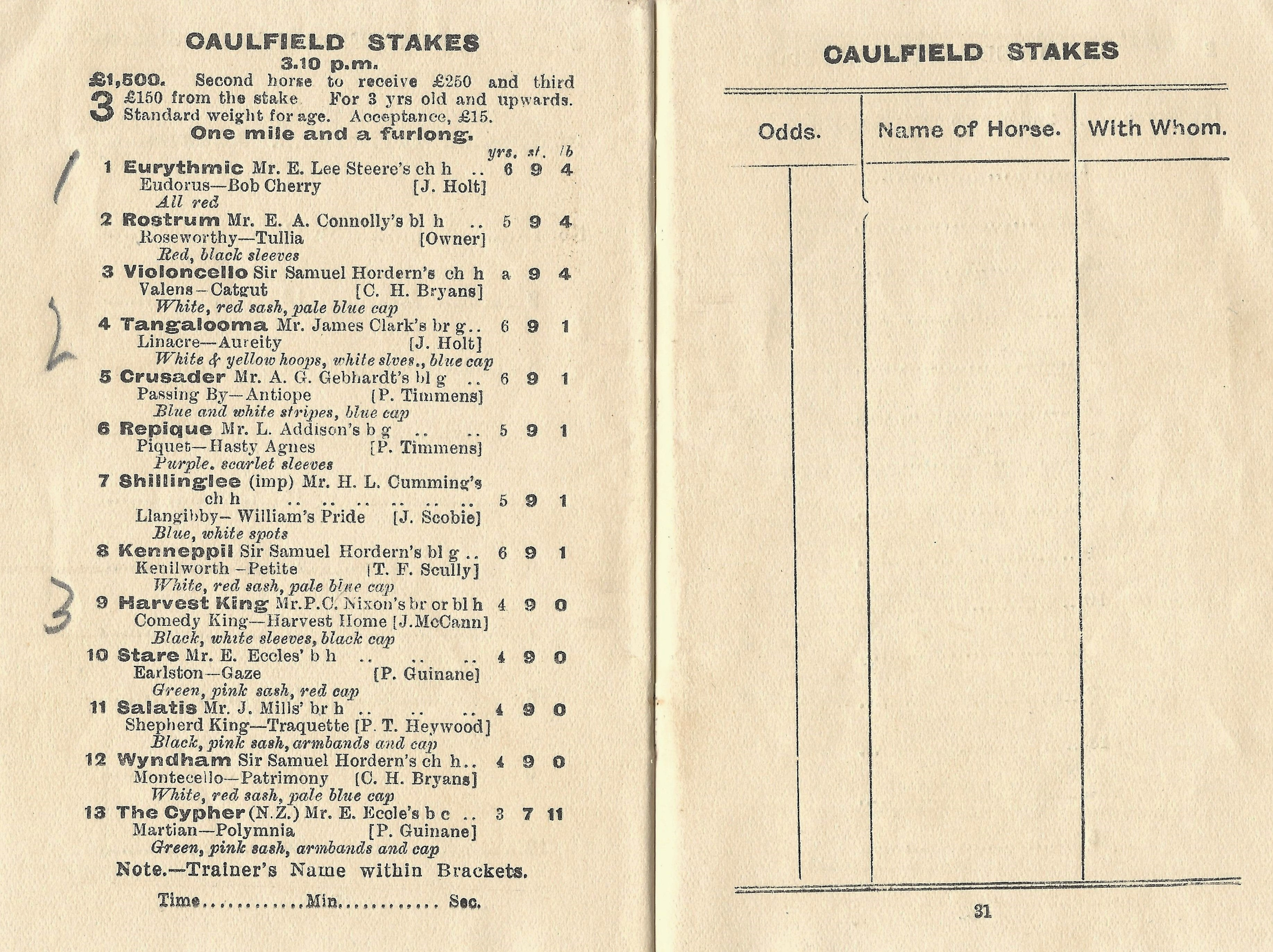
1922 VATC Caulfield Stakes showing the winner, Eurythmic

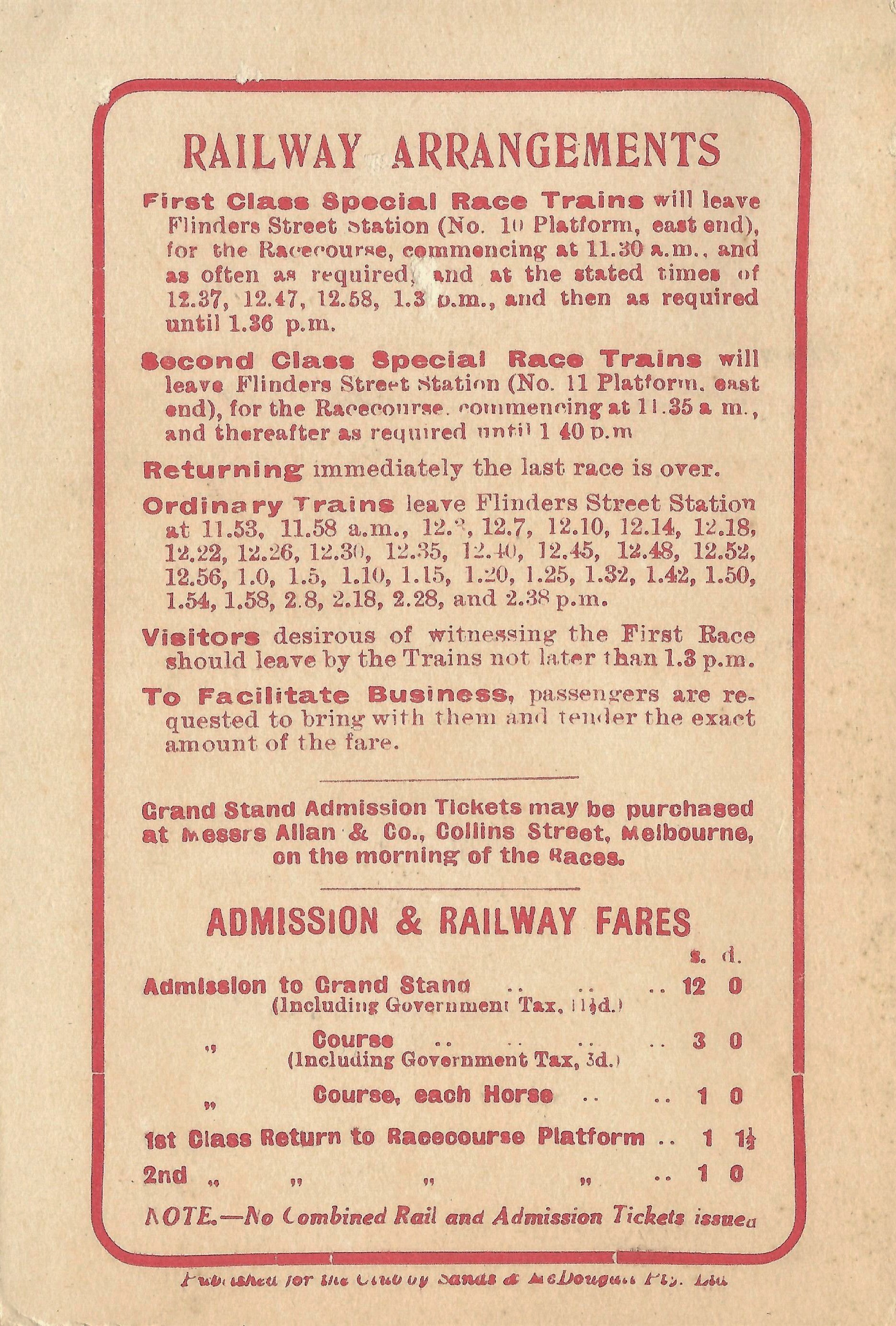
Back cover showing railway arrangements and admission fares

=== Gallery of noted winners ===
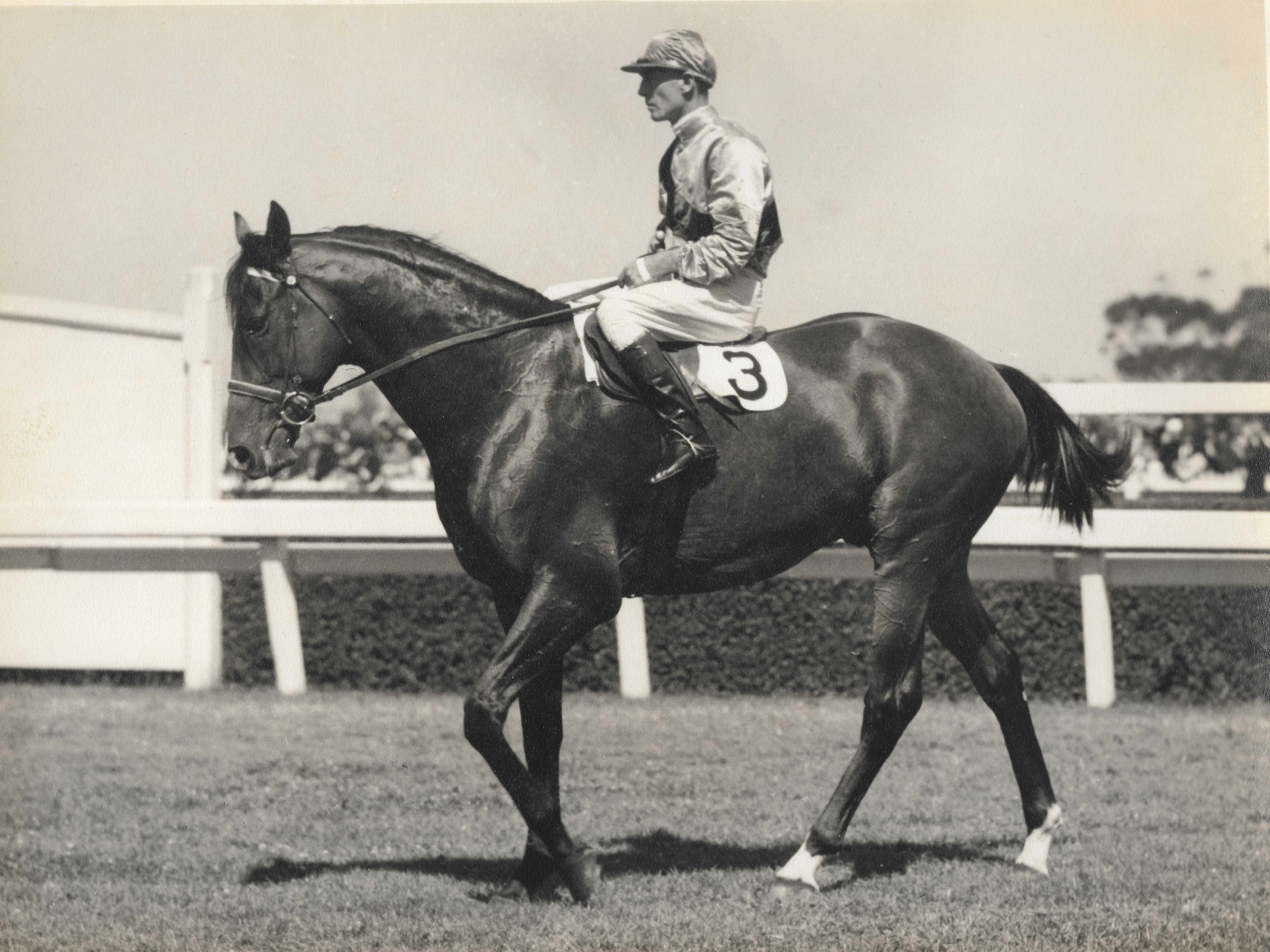
High Caste, 1939, 1940, winner

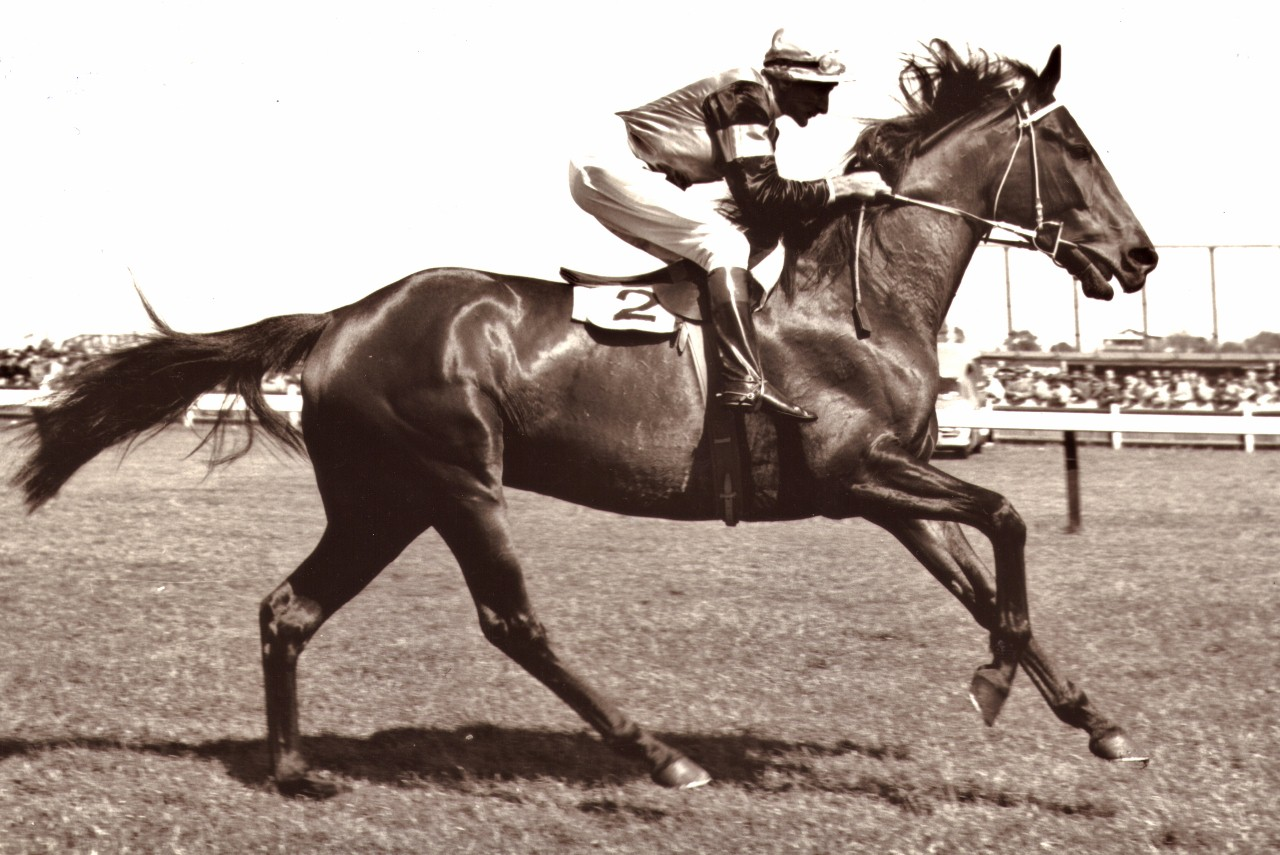
Rising Fast, 1954 winner

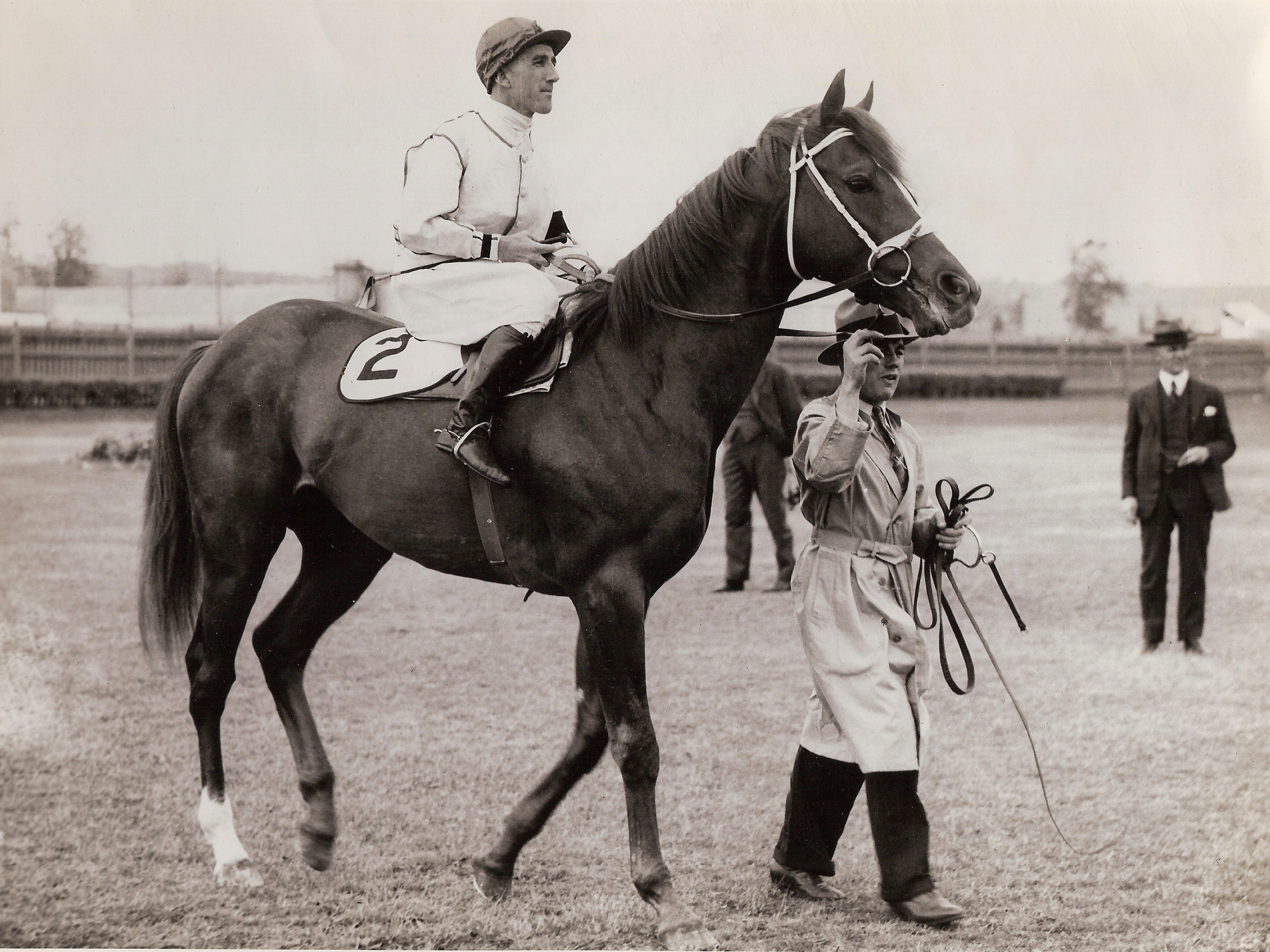
Ajax, 1938 winner

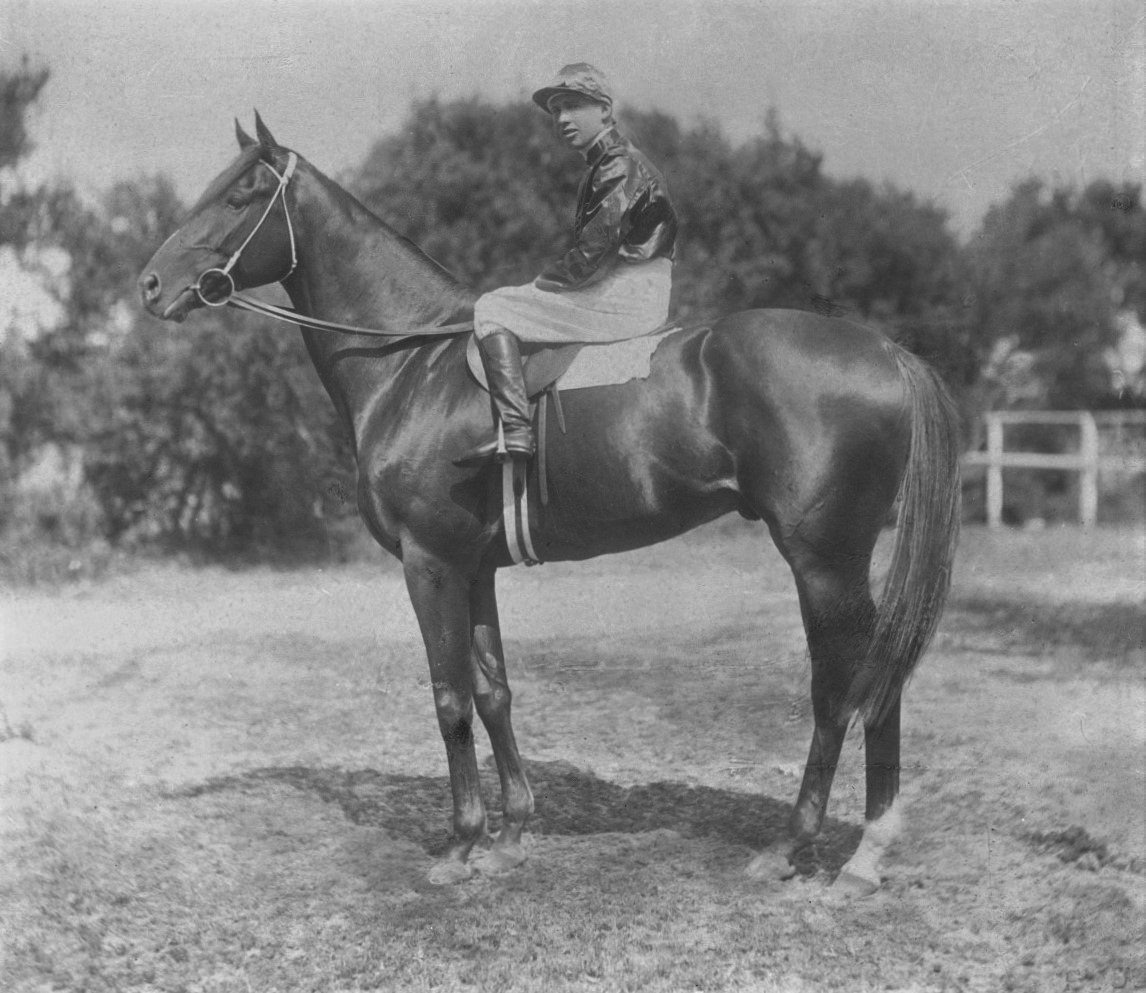
Eurythmic, 1921, 1922, 1923, winner

== Winners ==
The following are past winners of the Caulfield Stakes.

- 2026 - Land Legend
- 2025 - Globe
- 2024 - Deny Knowledge
- 2023 - Alligator Blood
- 2022 - Anamoe
- 2021 - Probabeel
- 2020 - Arcadia Queen
- 2019 - Cape Of Good Hope
- 2018 - Benbatl
- 2017 - Gailo Chop
- 2016 - Winx
- 2015 - Criterion
- 2014 - Fawkner
- 2013 - Atlantic Jewel
- 2012 - Ocean Park
- 2011 - Descarado
- 2010 - So You Think
- 2009 - Whobegotyou
- 2008 - Douro Valley
- 2007 - Maldivian
- 2006 - Casual Pass
- 2005 - El Segundo
- 2004 - Mummify
- 2003 - Lonhro
- 2002 - Lonhro
- 2001 - Northerly
- 2000 - Sky Heights
- 1999 - Northern Drake
- 1998 - Might And Power
- 1997 - Filante
- 1996 - Juggler
- 1995 - Danewin
- 1994 - Rough Habit
- 1993 - Naturalism
- 1992 - Castletown
- 1991 - Shaftesbury Avenue
- 1990 - Sydeston
- 1989 - Almaarad
- 1988 - Sky Chase
- 1987 - Drought
- 1986 - Bonecrusher
- 1985 - Tristarc
- 1984 - Alibhai
- 1983 - Mr. McGinty
- 1982 - Kingston Town
- 1981 - Kingston Town
- 1980 - Hyperno
- 1979 - Mighty Kingdom
- 1978 - Lloyd Boy
- 1977 - Family Of Man
- 1976 - How Now
- 1975 - † Guest Star / Zambari
- 1974 - Igloo
- 1973 - Glengowan
- 1972 - Gunsynd
- 1971 - Gay Icarus
- 1970 - † Gay Poss / Arctic Symbol
- 1969 - Hamua
- 1968 - Future
- 1967 - Winfreux
- 1966 - Winfreux
- 1965 - Winfreux
- 1964 - Contempler
- 1963 - Sometime
- 1962 - Sky High
- 1961 - Sky High
- 1960 - † Lord / Dhaulagiri
- 1959 - Lord
- 1958 - Lord
- 1957 - Ray Ribbon
- 1956 - Redcraze
- 1955 - Prince Cortauld
- 1954 - Rising Fast
- 1953 - Flying Halo
- 1952 - Peshawar
- 1951 - Grey Boots
- 1950 - Comic Court
- 1949 - Iron Duke
- 1948 - De La Salle
- 1947 - Columnist
- 1946 - Bernborough
- 1945 - Lawrence
- 1944 - Lawrence
- 1943 - Amana
- 1942 - Tranquil Star
- 1941 - Lucrative
- 1940 - High Caste
- 1939 - High Caste
- 1938 - Ajax
- 1937 - Charles Fox
- 1936 - Young Idea
- 1935 - Feldspar
- 1934 - Hall Mark
- 1933 - Chatham
- 1932 - Middle Watch
- 1931 - Cimbrian
- 1930 - Amounis
- 1929 - High Syce
- 1928 - Gothic
- 1927 - Royal Charter
- 1926 - Manfred
- 1925 - Heroic
- 1924 - The Hawk
- 1923 - Maid Of The Mist
- 1922 - Eurythmic
- 1921 - Eurythmic
- 1920 - Eurythmic
- 1919 - Night Watch
- 1918 - Magpie
- 1917 - Lanius
- 1916 - Lavendo
- 1915 - Traquette
- 1914 - Anna Carlovna
- 1913 - Mountain Princess
- 1912 - Royal Scotch
- 1911 - Malt King
- 1910 - Artillerie
- 1909 - Artillerie
- 1908 - Pink 'Un
- 1907 - Ebullition
- 1906 - Solution
- 1905 - Torah
- 1904 - Gladsome
- 1903 - Abundance
- 1902 - Wakeful
- 1901 - Wakeful
- 1900 - Severity
- 1899 - Australian Star
- 1898 - The Chief
- 1897 - Coil
- 1896 - Hopscotch
- 1895 - Atlas
- 1894 - The Harvester
- 1893 - Brockleigh
- 1892 - Camoola
- 1891 - Marvel
- 1890 - The Admiral
- 1889 - Dreadnought
- 1888 - Mentor
- 1887 - Cranbrook
- 1886 - Isonomy

† Dead heat

== See also ==
- Caulfield Guineas
- Ladies Day Vase
- Herbert Power Stakes
- Northwood Plume Stakes
- Schillaci Stakes
- Toorak Handicap
- List of Australian Group races
- Group races
