= 2025 Melbourne Cup =

Australian thoroughbred horse race

- Melbourne Cup
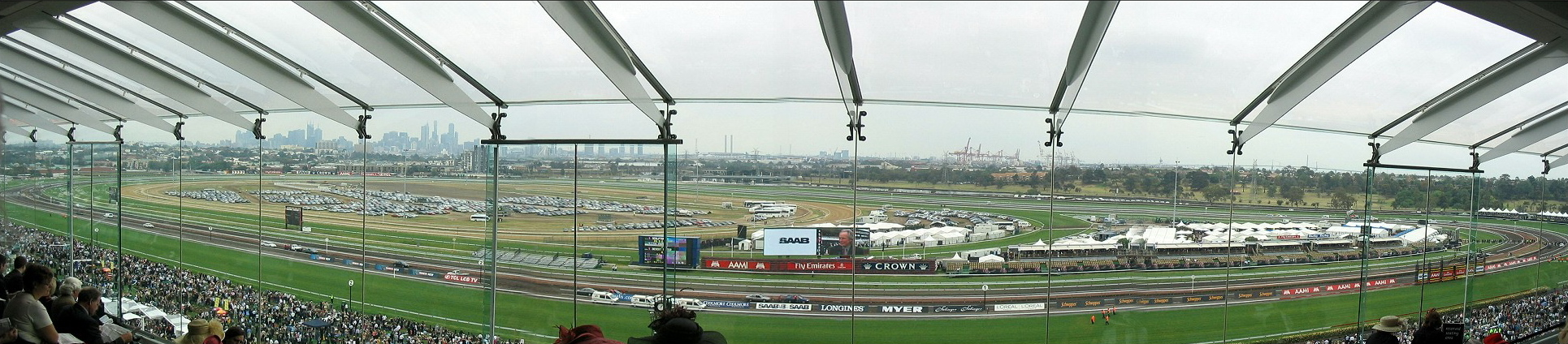
- Flemington Racecourse, location of the race
- Location: Flemington Racecourse; Melbourne, Australia
- Date: 4 November 2025
- Distance: 3,200 metres
- Winning horse: Half Yours
- Starting price: $8
- Jockey: Jamie Melham
- Trainer: Tony & Calvin McEvoy
- Surface: Grass
- Attendance: 84,374

300 meters to go, Goodie Two Shoes for Ireland led by a length and a quarter, Middle Earth and Half Yours is getting through. Goodie Two Shoes with Half Yours challenging at the clock tower. Half Yours takes the lead from Goodie Two Shoes, Middle Earth, River of Stars. Half Yours is coming clear, for Jamie Kah for the Cups Double. Half Yours the history-maker, won the Lexus Melbourne Cup by three lengths!

— Commentator Matt Hill describes the climax of the race

The 2025 Melbourne Cup, known commercially as the 2025 Lexus Melbourne Cup, was the 165th running of the Melbourne Cup, an Australian thoroughbred horse race. The race, run over 3,200 metres (1.988 mi), was held on 4 November 2025 at Melbourne's Flemington Racecourse.

The final field for the race was declared on 1 November 2025. The total prize money for the race is A$10 million, a $1.44 million increase from 2024. The race was won by Half Yours, ridden by Jamie Melham, the first woman to win since Michelle Payne in 2015.

== Field ==
Number	Horse	Trainer	Jockey	Weight (kg)	Barrier	Placing
1	Al Riffa (FR)	Joseph O'Brien	Mark Zahra	59	19	7th
2	Buckaroo (GB)	Chris Waller	Craig Williams	57	12	24th
3	Arapaho (FR)	Bjorn Baker	Rachel King	56.5	15	12th
4	Vauban (FR)	Gai Waterhouse & Adrian Bott	Blake Shinn	56.5	2	6th
5	Chevalier Rose (JPN)	Hisashi Shimizu	Damian Lane	55.5	5	23rd
6	Presage Nocturne (IRE)	Alessandro Botti	Stephane Pasquier	55.5	9	19th
7	Middle Earth (GB)	Ciaron Maher	Ethan Brown	54.5	13	3rd
8	Meydaan (IRE)	Simon & Ed Crisford	James McDonald	54	22	10th
9	Absurde (FR)	Willie Mullins	Kerrin McEvoy	53.5	4	8th
10	Flatten The Curve (FR)	Henk Grewe	Thore Hammer-Hansen	53.5	17	13th
11	Land Legend (FR)	Chris Waller	Joao Moreira	53.5	16	22nd
12	Smokin' Romans (NZ)	Ciaron Maher	Ben Melham	53.5	11	14th
13	Changingoftheguard (IRE)	Kris Lees	Tim Clark	53	24	9th
14	Half Yours	Tony & Calvin McEvoy	Jamie Melham	53	8	1st
15	More Felons (IRE)	Chris Waller	Tommy Berry	53	23	18th
16	Onesmoothoperator (USA)	Brian Ellison	Harry Coffey	53	6	16th
17	Furthur (IRE)	Andrew Balding	Michael Dee	52	7	11th
18	Parchment Party (USA)	William Mott	John Velazquez	52	3	20th
19	Athabascan (FR)	John O'Shea & Tom Charlton	Declan Bates	51.5	1	21st
20	Goodie Two Shoes (IRE)	Joseph O'Brien	Wayne Lordan	51.5	20	2nd
21	River Of Stars (IRE)	Chris Waller	Beau Mertens	51.5	14	4th
22	Royal Supremacy (IRE)	Ciaron Maher	Robbie Dolan	51	21	15th
23	Torranzino (NZ)	Paul Preusker	Celine Gaudray	51	18	5th
24	Valiant King (GB)	Chris Waller	Jye McNeil	51	10	16th

== Previous Melbourne Cup involvement ==
=== Horses ===
Absurde, Land Legend, Buckaroo, Vauban, Onesmoothoperator and Valiant King returned from 2024, where they placed 5th, 8th, 9th, 11th, 12th and 13th respectively. Absurde and Vauban also participated in 2023, placing 7th and 14th respectively, as well as More Felons who placed 12th. Smokin' Romans and Arapaho participated in 2022, placing 7th and 11th respectively. Athabascan was in the field in 2024 but was scratched.

=== Jockeys ===
Several former champions raced: three-time champion Kerrin McEvoy (2000, 2016 and 2018), two-time champion Mark Zahra (2022 and 2023), and one-time champions Blake Shinn (2008), Craig Williams (2019), Jye McNeil (2020), James McDonald (2021) and Robbie Dolan (2024). Other jockeys in the field with Cup success included Joao Moreira (2nd in 2016 and 2023), Ben Melham (2nd in 2017), Jamie Melham (3rd in 2020 and 2024, but who won this iteration), Wayne Lordan (3rd in 2019) and Beau Mertens (3rd in 2023). Among the jockeys, only five had not previously participated in the cup: Ethan Brown, Celine Gaudray, Thore Hammer-Hansen, Stéphane Pasquier and John Velazquez.

=== Trainers ===
Former winning trainers participating were Joseph O'Brien (2017 and 2020), Gai Waterhouse (2013), Chris Waller (2021) and Ciaron Maher (2022).

== Prizemoney ==
The A$10,000,000 prize pool is distributed as follows:

- First: $4,500,000 and trophies valued at $910,000 (Note: $850,000 (owner); $25,000 (rider – including the Harry White Whip); $15,000 (trainer); $10,000 (strapper – the Tommy Woodcock Trophy) & $10,000 (breeder))
- Second: $1,110,000
- Third: $560,000
- Fourth: $360,000
- Fifth: $240,000
- Sixth to Twelfth: $160,000
- Thirteenth to Twenty Fourth: $100,000

The prizemoney increased by A$2,250,000 from the 2024 race to include, for the first time, prizemoney for runners that finished from thirteenth to last should the runner meet conditions set out by the VRC.

== See also ==
- List of Melbourne Cup winners
- List of Melbourne Cup placings
- Melbourne Spring Racing Carnival
