= Richard Keddie =

Australian producer, writer and director

Richard Lachlan Keddie is an Australian producer, writer and director. He is best known for his work on biopics of Australian prime ministers Bob Hawke (Hawke) and John Curtin (Curtin), feature films Little Fish, Oddball and Ride Like a Girl, and television miniseries After the Deluge.

== Career ==
=== Documentaries ===
==== As writer, producer and director ====
Keddie began his career in filmmaking writing, producing and directing documentaries. These include the eight-part On Borrowed Time (1990), for which he was shortlisted as the IBM Australian Conservationist of the Year and awarded the Landcare Media Award and a Penguin Award for Best Documentary. This was followed by Farming A Sunburnt Country (1994) for the National Climate Centre and Chinchilla Dry (1996), a social commentary on farming and drought.

He was awarded the United Nations Association of Australia Media Peace Prize for Rite of Passage (1997), about a group of troubled young people on a bushwalk in the Australian wilderness. Outnumbered, an observational documentary on Victoria's Leader of the Opposition John Brumby during the 1996 Victorian State Election followed in 1998.

==== As producer ====
Keddie produced documentary Wonder Boy (2001), a portrayal of family life and the complexity of supporting a child with special needs in 2001, The Last Great Amateurs about the Melbourne Phoenix Netball Club in 2004, Musica Surfica featuring violinist and Director of the Australian Chamber Orchestra Richard Tognetti in 2008, and Alias Ruby Blade, concerning the independence movement in Timor-Leste in 2012. Alias Ruby Blade was awarded the Peace Award for most Valuable Documentary at the Berlin Film Festival.

=== Advertisements and political campaigns ===
Keddie wrote and directed advertisements for the 'Your Rights at Work' campaign against the Howard government's 2006 WorkChoices legislation, federal election campaigns for the Australian Labor Party, and environmental justice advertisements including for the WWF and the fight to save the Great Barrier Reef, the Coorong and the Murray-Darling Basin.

=== Television films ===
Television films produced by Keddie include Waiting at the Royal (2000), the story of four women sharing a maternity ward, My Brother Jack (2001), an adaptation of the 1964 novel by George Johnston, and After the Deluge (2003) starring David Wenham and Hugo Weaving. Keddie produced biopics of former Australian Labor Party Prime Ministers John Curtin (William McInnes) and Bob Hawke (Richard Roxburgh) in 2007 and 2010. Curtin won the Logie Award for Most Outstanding Drama Series, and My Brother Jack, After the Deluge and Hawke the AACTA Award for Best Telefeature, Mini Series or Short Run Series.

=== Feature films ===
Keddie has produced five feature films: Little Fish (2005, directed by Rowan Woods and starring Cate Blanchett), Matching Jack (2010, directed by Nadia Tass and starring Jacinda Barrett and James Nesbitt), Goddess (2013, directed by Mark Lamprell and starring Laura Michelle Kelly and Ronan Keating), Oddball (2015, directed by Stuart McDonald and starring Shane Jacobson) and Ride Like a Girl, (2019, about Michelle Payne, the first woman to win the Melbourne Cup in 2015, directed by Rachel Griffiths and starring Teresa Palmer and Sam Neill). Little Fish won five AFI Awards and grossed the highest Australian box office of the year. Oddball become the 28th highest grossing film of all-time at the Australian box office, and Ride Like a Girl the highest grossing Australian film of 2019. It has been nominated for three awards at the 9th AACTA Awards: Best Film, Best Actress (Teresa Palmer), and Best Original Music Score (David Hirschfelder).

=== Boards and governance ===
Keddie has served on boards including the Federal Government Board of Screen Australia, St Michael's Grammar School, and Film Victoria.
