= 1962 Melbourne Cup =

Edition of the Melbourne Cup

- Melbourne Cup
- Location: Flemington Racecourse
- Date: 6 Nov 1962
- Distance: 2 miles
- Winning horse: Even Stevens
- Winning time: 3:21.40
- Final odds: 3/1
- Jockey: Les Coles
- Trainer: Arch McGregor
- Owner: James Wattle
- Surface: Turf

At the 2, and Aquanita shot two lengths clear of The Dip and Even Stevens now coming home well, then Baroda Gleam, Lord Fury and Comicquita. Aquanita's given in, he's caught by Even Stevens and Comicquita coming from nowhere. It's Even Stevens clear at the furlong, from Aquanita and Comicquita then Blue Shaun finishing well from The Dip. But Even Stevens took good from them in the run to the post and he's coming away to win the Melbourne Cup, clearly from Comicquita.

— Commentator Bill Collins describes the climax of the race.

The 1962 Melbourne Cup was a two-mile handicap horse race which took place on Tuesday, 6 November 1962. It was the 102nd running of the Melbourne Cup.

== Details ==
The 1962 Melbourne Cup saw New Zealander Even Stevens start as the 3/1 favourite. After setting a race record on his Australian debut, he was heavily backed to take the Cups double. Even Stevens was allowed to bowl along in front in the Caulfield Cup and won in a canter. Trainer Arch McGregor took the unusual decision to start Even Stevens in the Werribee Cup, which he won easily carrying 9st 5lb (59.5kg). Despite the rehandicap for the Melbourne Cup, following his Caulfield Cup triumph, where he would carry 8st 5lb (53kg), Even Stevens started a short 3/1 favourite. Under regular jockey Les Coles, Even Stevens won by four lengths ahead of Comicquita, daughter of 1950 Melbourne Cup winner Comic Court, with third place Aquinita another three lengths away.

This is the list of placegetters for the 1962 Melbourne Cup.

Place	Name	Jockey	Trainer
1	Even Stevens	Les Coles	Arch McGregor
2	Comicquita	D. Lake	A. Lopes
3	Aquanita	F. Moore	R. J. Shaw

== See also ==
- Melbourne Cup
- List of Melbourne Cup winners
- Victoria Racing Club
