= Jamie Melham =

Australian jockey (born 1995)

Personal information
- Born: Jamie Lee Kah; 1995 (age 30–31) South Australia
- Occupation: Jockey

Horse racing career
- Sport: Horse racing

Major racing wins
- Australian Cup (2019); Australian Guineas (2024); Caulfield Cup (2025); Doncaster Handicap (2021, 2026); Hong Kong Classic Mile (2023); Melbourne Cup (2025); Newmarket Handicap (2024); Victoria Derby (2024)

Jamie Lee Melham (née Kah; born 1995) is an Australian jockey. In 2020/21 she became the first jockey to ride 100 winners in a Melbourne Metropolitan racing season. In 2020 and 2021 she was the leading female jockey in the world. She is the second female jockey to win the Melbourne Cup (after Michelle Payne in 2015) and the first to win the Caulfield Cup. As of 4 April 2026, she has ridden 20 Group One winners.

== Early life and education ==
Melham is the daughter of John and Karen Kah, former speed skaters who represented Australia at the Winter Olympics. Her grandparents are Dutch.

She grew up in Mount Pleasant in the Adelaide Hills in South Australia, and between the ages of eight and ten she attended regular lessons and pony camp at the Kersbrook Equestrian Centre. She began working at a friend's stables when she was 13.

== Career ==
Melham left school aged 15, and began her riding apprenticeship in 2011, rode her first race in March 2012 at Streaky Bay, and rode her first winner 14 days later at the Easter Saturday meeting at Clare.

In her first full season, 2012/13, Melham won the Adelaide Jockeys' Premiership. She won the Premiership for a third time in 2017/18, then moved to Melbourne in January 2019, and won her first Group One race on Harlem in the Australian Cup at Flemington in March.

In October 2020, Melham was ranked the leading female jockey in the world, and 77th jockey overall. In February 2021 she was the world's 41st jockey overall, and the only female jockey in the top 100. She rode her 1000th winner at the Pakenham racecourse on Wednesday, 12 May 2021. She was the third woman, after Clare Lindop in 2008 and Linda Meech in 2013, to ride 1000 winners in Australia. As of early April 2026 she had ridden 1,368 winners, including 20 in Group One races.

On 10 July 2021, Melham became the first jockey to ride 100 winners in a Melbourne Metropolitan racing season. She finished the Metropolitan season with 105 winners.

In September 2021 she was suspended for five months by the Victorian Racing Tribunal for breaching COVID-19 regulations and for providing false or misleading evidence to the breach investigation. She appealed against the severity of the penalty to the Victorian Supreme Court, which upheld her appeal on 17 November, freeing her to resume riding.

Melham was seriously injured in a fall during a race at Flemington on 11 March 2023, and spent several days in an induced coma at the Royal Melbourne Hospital. She suffered brain injuries and several broken bones. After months of rehabilitation and weeks of trackwork, she returned to racing with four rides at Randwick on 19 August.

In October 2025, riding Half Yours, Melham became the first female jockey to win the Caulfield Cup. In November, again on Half Yours, she became the second female jockey to win the Melbourne Cup, ten years on from Michelle Payne's historic victory.

In a Group 3 race at Flemington that followed the 2025 Melbourne Cup, Melham was involved in an incident which resulted in the fall and injury of jockey Blake Shinn. Melham pleaded guilty to careless riding and was suspended by Racing Victoria stewards from 16 November to 17 December 2025.

== Personal life ==
For some years, Melham and Clayton Douglas, a fellow jockey and trainer, had a property on the Mornington Peninsula. In January 2025, she married fellow jockey Ben Melham.

== Major wins ==
Australia

- Australian Cup – (1) – Harlem (2019)
- Australian Guineas – (1) – Southport Tycoon (2024)
- Moir Stakes – (1) – Coolangatta (2022)
- Black Caviar Lightning – (2) – Nature Strip (2021), Coolangatta (2023)
- Blue Diamond Stakes – (1) – Hayasugi (2024)
- C F Orr Stakes – (1) – Another Wil (2025)
- VRC Champions Stakes – (1) – Zaaki (2022)
- Caulfield Cup – (1) – Half Yours (2025)
- Doncaster Handicap – (1) – Cascadian (2021)
- Kingsford-Smith Cup – (1) – Vega One (2021)
- Makybe Diva Stakes – (1) – Gatting (2019)
- Melbourne Cup – (1) – Half Yours (2025)
- Newmarket Handicap – (1) – Cylinder (2024)
- Toorak Handicap – (1) – Mr Quickie (2020)
- The Goodwood – (2) – Benedetta (2024), Reserve Bank (2025)
- South Australian Derby – (1) – Coco Sun (2024)
- Victoria Derby – (1) – Goldrush Guru (2024)

Hong Kong

- Hong Kong Classic Mile – (1) – Voyage Bubble (2023)
