= Ride Like a Girl =

2019 film by Rachel Griffiths

- Theatrical release poster
- Directed by: Rachel Griffiths
- Written by: Andrew Knight; Elise McCredie
- Produced by: Richard Keddie; Rachel Griffiths; Susie Montague-Delaney
- Starring: Teresa Palmer; Sam Neill
- Cinematography: Martin McGrath
- Edited by: Jill Bilcock; Maria Papoutsis
- Music by: David Hirschfelder
- Distributed by: Screen Australia; Transmission Films
- Release date: 26 September 2019
- Running time: 118 minutes
- Country: Australia
- Language: English
- Box office: $9.6 million

Ride Like a Girl is a 2019 Australian biographical sports drama film directed by Rachel Griffiths in her feature film directing debut and starring Teresa Palmer and Sam Neill. It is based on the true story of Michelle Payne, the first female jockey to win the Melbourne Cup in 2015.

The film is book-ended with documentary footage, which shows at the start Payne as a small girl saying she wants to win the Melbourne Cup and at the end, as a young woman, winning the 'race that stops a nation'. In her memorable victory speech, which was televised live across Australia, she told all the people along the way who had said she could not do it, to “get stuffed”. Griffiths watched the speech at a Cup day barbecue and was inspired to make the film.

== Plot ==
Teresa Palmer plays Michelle Payne, the youngest of ten children of racehorse trainer Paddy Payne, who dreams of becoming a jockey and becomes the first woman to win the Melbourne Cup in 2015.

== Cast ==
- Teresa Palmer as Michelle Payne
  - Summer North as Young Michelle Payne
- Sam Neill as Paddy Payne
- Stevie Payne as himself
- Genevieve Morris as Joan Sadler
- Brooke Satchwell as Therese Payne
- Sullivan Stapleton as Darren Weir
- Magda Szubanski as Sister Dominique
- Anne Phelan as Sister Mary
- Zara Zoe as Maree Payne
- Sophia Forrest as Cathy Payne
- Shane Bourne as Trevor Smart
- Dawn Brennan as Wedding Extra
- Karen Brennan as Wedding Extra
- Benjamin Bartlett as Wedding Extra
- Mick Molloy as Bairdy
- Annaliese Apps as Brigid Payne
- Maude Davey as therapist

== Release ==
Ride Like a Girl was released in Australia on 26 September 2019, and was distributed worldwide by Paramount Home Video on 10 March 2020.

== Reception ==
68% of the 34 reviews compiled on review aggregator website Rotten Tomatoes are positive, with an average rating of 6.6/10. The website's critics consensus reads: "Ride Like a Girl is far from the subtlest inspirational drama, but its fact-based story and charming cast are just enough to guide it down the stretch." On Metacritic, the film has a weighted average score of 47 out of 100, based on 6 critics, indicating "mixed or average reviews".

=== Accolades ===
Award	Category	Subject	Result	Ref
AACTA Awards (9th)	Best Film	Richard Keddie	Nominated	
AACTA Awards (9th)	Best Film	Rachel Griffiths	Nominated	
AACTA Awards (9th)	Best Film	Susie Montague	Nominated	
AACTA Awards (9th)	Best Actress	Teresa Palmer	Nominated	
AACTA Awards (9th)	Best Original Music Score	David Hirschfelder	Nominated	

== See also ==
- List of films about horse racing
- List of films about horses
