= Half Yours =

Thoroughbred racehorse

- Sire: St Jean
- Grandsire: Teofilo
- Dam: La Gazelle
- Damsire: Desert King
- Sex: Gelding
- Foaled: 10 October 2020
- Country: Australia
- Colour: Chestnut
- Breeder: C & J McKenna
- Owner: Kildalton Park Racing et al.
- Trainer: Tony & Calvin McEvoy
- Record: 16 8-3-0
- Earnings: $9,251,840

Major wins
- Naturalism Stakes (2025); Caulfield Cup (2025); Melbourne Cup (2025)
- Last updated on 4 November 2025

Half Yours (foaled 10 October 2020) is a Thoroughbred racehorse. Based in Ballarat, Victoria, he won the 2025 Caulfield Cup and 2025 Melbourne Cup, ridden by Jamie Melham and trained by Tony & Calvin McEvoy.

== See also ==
- List of Melbourne Cup winners
