= Even Stevens (horse) =

New Zealand-bred Thoroughbred racehorse

- Sire: Fairs Fair
- Grandsire: Fair Trial
- Dam: Amaroo
- Damsire: Gold Nib
- Sex: Stallion
- Foaled: 1957
- Country: New Zealand
- Colour: Chestnut
- Breeder: D. P. Clark
- Owner: James Wattie
- Trainer: Archie McGregor

Major wins
- Avondale Cup (1961); C.B.Fisher Plate (1962); Caulfield Cup (1962); Melbourne Cup (1962)

Even Stevens (1957–1975) was a Thoroughbred racehorse that won both the Caulfield and Melbourne cups in Australia in 1962. He was ridden in both cups by his regular rider Les Coles.

== Career ==
Even Stevens won 8 races in total, including the 1962 Melbourne Cup, Caulfield Cup and Werribee Cup, and £43,895 in prize money.

He was leased to Her Majesty Queen Elizabeth, the Queen Mother, but prior to sailing for England, suffered an accident in training which necessitated his retirement from racing.

He was retired to stud in New Zealand in 1963 where he sired two Group 1 winners, Master John and Evenstead. He died in 1975.

== Namesake ==
Australian rail operator CFCL Australia named locomotive CF4403 after the horse.
