= Rivette (horse) =

Australian Thoroughbred racehorse

- Sire: Ronsard
- Grandsire: Son-in-Law
- Dam: Riv
- Damsire: Cyklon
- Sex: Mare
- Foaled: 1933
- Died: 1960
- Country: Australia
- Colour: Bay
- Breeder: Harry Bamber
- Owner: Harry Bamber
- Trainer: Harry Bamber
- Jockey: Teddy Preston
- Record: 49: 11–7–8

Major wins
- Caulfield Cup (1939); Melbourne Cup (1939)

Rivette (1933−1960) was an Australian race horse that won the 1939 Melbourne Cup.

== Racing career ==
In 1939 Rivette became the first mare to ever win the Caulfield Cup and Melbourne Cup double in the same year. This feat would not be achieved for another 52 years when Let's Elope accomplished the double in 1991.

Rivette started the 5-1 favourite in the Melbourne Cup which had a field of 26 runners. She won the race by a half-length and earned £7,200 for Harry Bamber, who achieved a rare feat in Melbourne Cup history as the breeder, trainer and owner of the horse.

The Victorian Racing Club each year conducts the 'Rivette Series' to honour the racehorse. The series is aimed at 3YO fillies over the 1200m-1400m distance and takes in heats across metropolitan and country venues.

== Pedigree ==
Pedigree of Rivette (AUS) 1933
| Sire Ronsard (GB) 1924 | Son-in-Law (GB); 1911 | Dark Ronald | Bay Ronald |
| Sire Ronsard (GB) 1924 | Son-in-Law (GB); 1911 | Dark Ronald | Darkie |
| Sire Ronsard (GB) 1924 | Son-in-Law (GB); 1911 | Mother In Law | Matchmaker |
| Sire Ronsard (GB) 1924 | Son-in-Law (GB); 1911 | Mother In Law | Be Cannie |
| Sire Ronsard (GB) 1924 | Joie De Vivre (GB); 1908 | Gallinule | Isonomy |
| Sire Ronsard (GB) 1924 | Joie De Vivre (GB); 1908 | Gallinule | Moorhen |
| Sire Ronsard (GB) 1924 | Joie De Vivre (GB); 1908 | Melinda | Melton |
| Sire Ronsard (GB) 1924 | Joie De Vivre (GB); 1908 | Melinda | Fame |
| Dam Riv (AUS) 1919 | Cyklon (IRE); 1910 | Spearmint | Carbine |
| Dam Riv (AUS) 1919 | Cyklon (IRE); 1910 | Spearmint | Maid of the Mint |
| Dam Riv (AUS) 1919 | Cyklon (IRE); 1910 | Cyanean | Cyllene |
| Dam Riv (AUS) 1919 | Cyklon (IRE); 1910 | Cyanean | Nenemoosha |
| Dam Riv (AUS) 1919 | White River (IRE); 1910 | The White Knight | Desmond |
| Dam Riv (AUS) 1919 | White River (IRE); 1910 | The White Knight | Pella |
| Dam Riv (AUS) 1919 | White River (IRE); 1910 | Gyp | Grafton |
| Dam Riv (AUS) 1919 | White River (IRE); 1910 | Gyp | Phantassie |
