= Hawke (film) =

2010 television film

- Film poster
- Written by: Glen Dolman
- Directed by: Emma Freeman
- Starring: Richard Roxburgh; Rachael Blake; Felix Williamson; Sacha Horler; Asher Keddie
- Country of origin: Australia
- Original language: English

Production
- Producers: Richard Keddie; Rick Maier
- Editor: Rodrigo Balart
- Running time: 120 minutes (including commercials)

Original release
- Network: Network 10
- Release: 18 July 2010

Hawke is a 2010 television drama film directed by Emma Freeman, based on the life of Prime Minister of Australia Bob Hawke. The film was produced by The Film Company for Network Ten and premiered on 18 July 2010.

== Premise ==
The telemovie chronicles the life of former Australian Prime Minister Bob Hawke. It centres around the build up to his election in 1983, the situations he faced during his time as prime minister, and losing the 1991 leadership contests to his Treasurer and Deputy Prime Minister Paul Keating. The film begins and ends with this event, but proceeds to show the rest of Hawke's life through flashbacks.

== Cast ==
- Richard Roxburgh as Bob Hawke
- Rachael Blake as Hazel Hawke
- Felix Williamson as Paul Keating
- Sacha Horler as Jean Sinclair
- Asher Keddie as Blanche d'Alpuget
- Julia Blake as Ellie Hawke
- Terry Norris as Clem Hawke

== Production ==
Hawke was first announced on 19 July 2009 by Network Ten with Richard Roxburgh said to play Bob Hawke. To accurately replicate Hawke's hair, a leading international wig maker from Germany and the film's hairdresser, who was on a Greek island, were flown in to Milan to fit Roxborough during pre-production. A scene was filmed on 25 August 2009 at Dallas Brooks Hall, East Melbourne.

Roxburgh reprised his role as Hawke in the 2020 episode "Terra Nullius" of the Netflix series The Crown.

== Awards ==
Australian Film Institute Television Awards

- Best Guest or Supporting Actress in Television Drama – Sacha Horler (2010)
- Best Guest or Supporting Actress in Television Drama – Asher Keddie (2010)
