= Prince of Penzance =

New Zealand-bred Thoroughbred racehorse

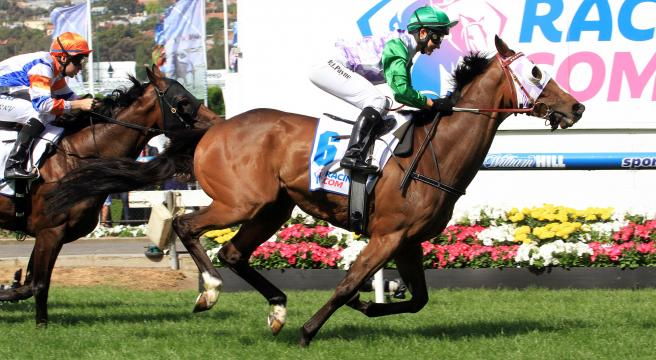
- Prince of Penzance winning the 2014 Moonee Valley Gold Cup with Michelle Payne
- Sire: Pentire
- Grandsire: Be My Guest
- Dam: Royal Successor
- Damsire: Mr. Prospector
- Sex: gelding
- Foaled: 20 November 2009
- Country: New Zealand
- Color: Bay
- Breeder: Rich Hill Stud, Matamata
- Trainer: Darren Weir
- Record: 29: 7-7-2
- Earnings: A$4,459,190

Major wins
- Melbourne Cup (2015); Moonee Valley Cup (2014); Mornington Cup Prelude (2014)

Prince of Penzance is a New Zealand-bred Thoroughbred race horse who won the 2015 Melbourne Cup. He was trained by Darren Weir. In the race, he was ridden by Michelle Payne, who became the first female jockey to win the race.

== Background ==
Prince of Penzance is a bay gelding with a white blaze bred by Rich Hill Stud in the Matamata region of New Zealand's North Island. He was sired by Pentire, a British horse who recorded his biggest win in the 1996 King George VI and Queen Elizabeth Stakes and had his biggest success in New Zealand where he sired Mufhasa (Telegraph Handicap), Rangirangdoo (Doncaster Mile) and Xcellent as well as Prince of Penzance. His dam Royal Successor is a daughter of the Irish-bred mare Only Royale who won the Yorkshire Oaks in 1993 and 1994. The name is a reference to the place name of Penzance in Cornwall.

== Racing career ==
Prince of Penzance's first notable win was in autumn 2014, in the Listed Mornington Cup Prelude. Races in the remainder of the year, and in early 2015, resulted in wins and placings, including a win in the Moonee Valley Gold Cup, a second place in the Queen Elizabeth Handicap and a third in the Zipping Classic. In the 2015 Melbourne Cup, Prince of Penzance started a 100/1 outsider in a 24-runner field. The Japanese challenger Fame Game was the 4/1 favourite ahead of British gelding Trip To Paris, the winner of the Ascot Gold Cup. Other overseas contenders included Max Dynamite, Bondi Beach and Kingfisher from Ireland, Big Orange (Goodwood Cup), Snow Sky (Hardwicke Stakes), Quest For More (Northumberland Plate) and Red Cadeaux from England and Hokko Brave from Japan. The best of the Australian-trained contingent appeared to be Preferment (Turnbull Stakes), Almoonqith (Geelong Cup) and Criterion (Australian Derby). Prince of Penzance was always travelling strongly, took the lead in the last 100 metres and won by half a length from Max Dynamite with Criterion in third.

== Pedigree ==
Pedigree of Prince Of Penzance (NZ), bay gelding, 2009
Sire Pentire (GB) 1992	Be My Guest (USA); 1983	Northern Dancer	Nearctic
Sire Pentire (GB) 1992	Be My Guest (USA); 1983	Northern Dancer	Natalma
Sire Pentire (GB) 1992	Be My Guest (USA); 1983	What A Treat	Tudor Minstrel
Sire Pentire (GB) 1992	Be My Guest (USA); 1983	What A Treat	Rare Treat
Sire Pentire (GB) 1992	Gull Nook (GB); 1983	Mill Reef	Never Bend
Sire Pentire (GB) 1992	Gull Nook (GB); 1983	Mill Reef	Milan Mill
Sire Pentire (GB) 1992	Gull Nook (GB); 1983	Bempton	Blakeney
Sire Pentire (GB) 1992	Gull Nook (GB); 1983	Bempton	Hardiemma
Dam Royal Successor (USA) 1999	Mr. Prospector (USA); 1970	Raise a Native	Native Dancer
Dam Royal Successor (USA) 1999	Mr. Prospector (USA); 1970	Raise a Native	Raise You
Dam Royal Successor (USA) 1999	Mr. Prospector (USA); 1970	Gold Digger	Nashua
Dam Royal Successor (USA) 1999	Mr. Prospector (USA); 1970	Gold Digger	Sequence
Dam Royal Successor (USA) 1999	Only Royale (IRE); 1989	Caerleon	Nijinsky
Dam Royal Successor (USA) 1999	Only Royale (IRE); 1989	Caerleon	Foreseer
Dam Royal Successor (USA) 1999	Only Royale (IRE); 1989	Etoile de Paris	Crowned Prince
Dam Royal Successor (USA) 1999	Only Royale (IRE); 1989	Etoile de Paris	Place d'Etoile (Family: 9-e)
