= Caulfield Cup =

Horse race held in Melbourne, Victoria, Australia

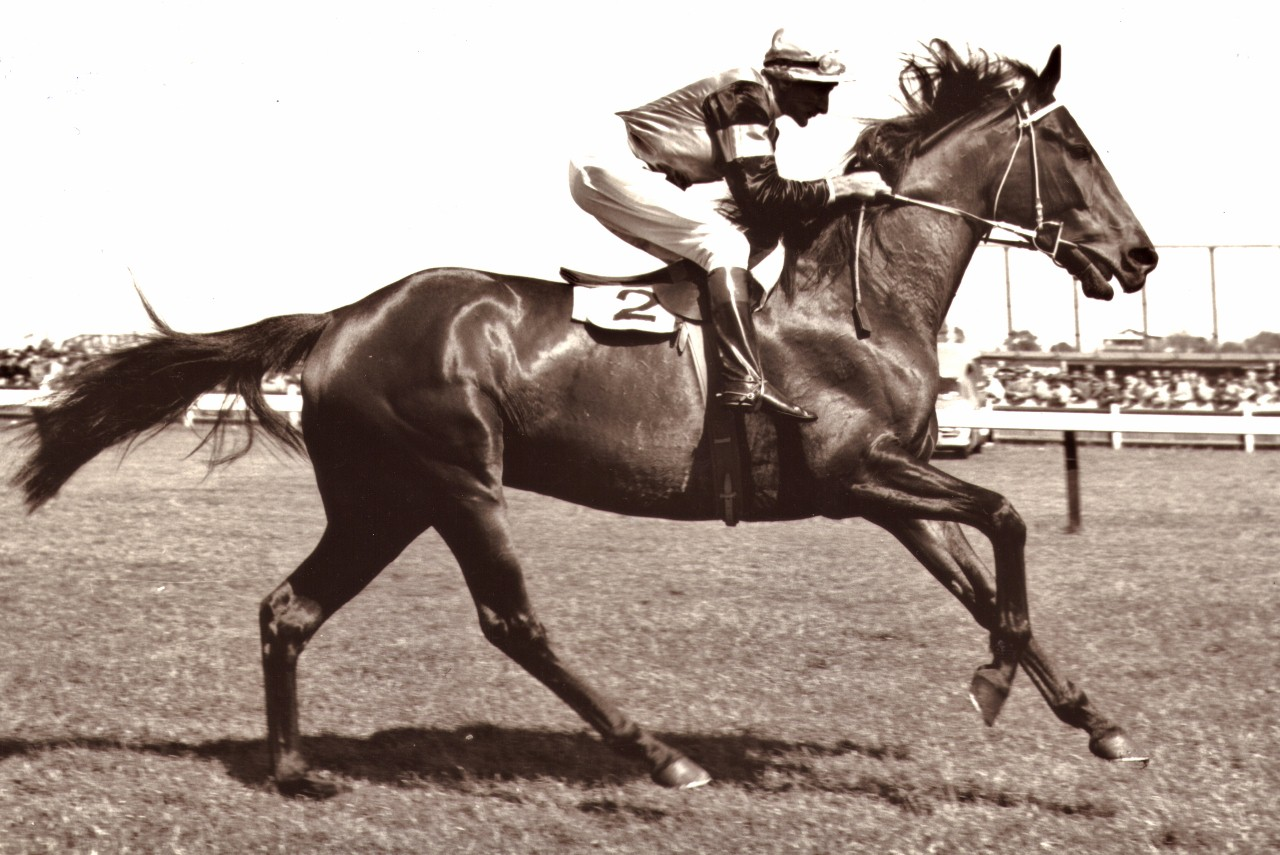
- 1954 & 1955 winner Rising Fast
- Class: Group 1
- Location: Caulfield Racecourse, Melbourne, Australia
- Inaugurated: 1879
- Race type: Thoroughbred – Flat racing
- Sponsor: Sportsbet (2026)

Race information
- Distance: 2,400 metres (1.5 miles)
- Surface: Turf
- Track: Left-handed
- Qualification: Horses three years old and older
- Weight: Handicap
- Purse: $6,545,000 (2026)
- Bonuses: Winner ballot exemption from the Melbourne Cup

The Caulfield Cup is a Melbourne Racing Club Group 1 Thoroughbred horse race held under handicap conditions. This is for all horses aged three years old and older. It takes place over a distance of 2400 metres at the Caulfield Racecourse, Melbourne, Australia in mid October.

== History ==
The race has become one of Australia's richest Thoroughbred horse races. The race is held annually on the third Saturday in October, the third day and final day of the Caulfield Carnival. Performances in the Caulfield Cup are one of the possible qualification methods for a run in the Melbourne Cup which is held 17 days later.

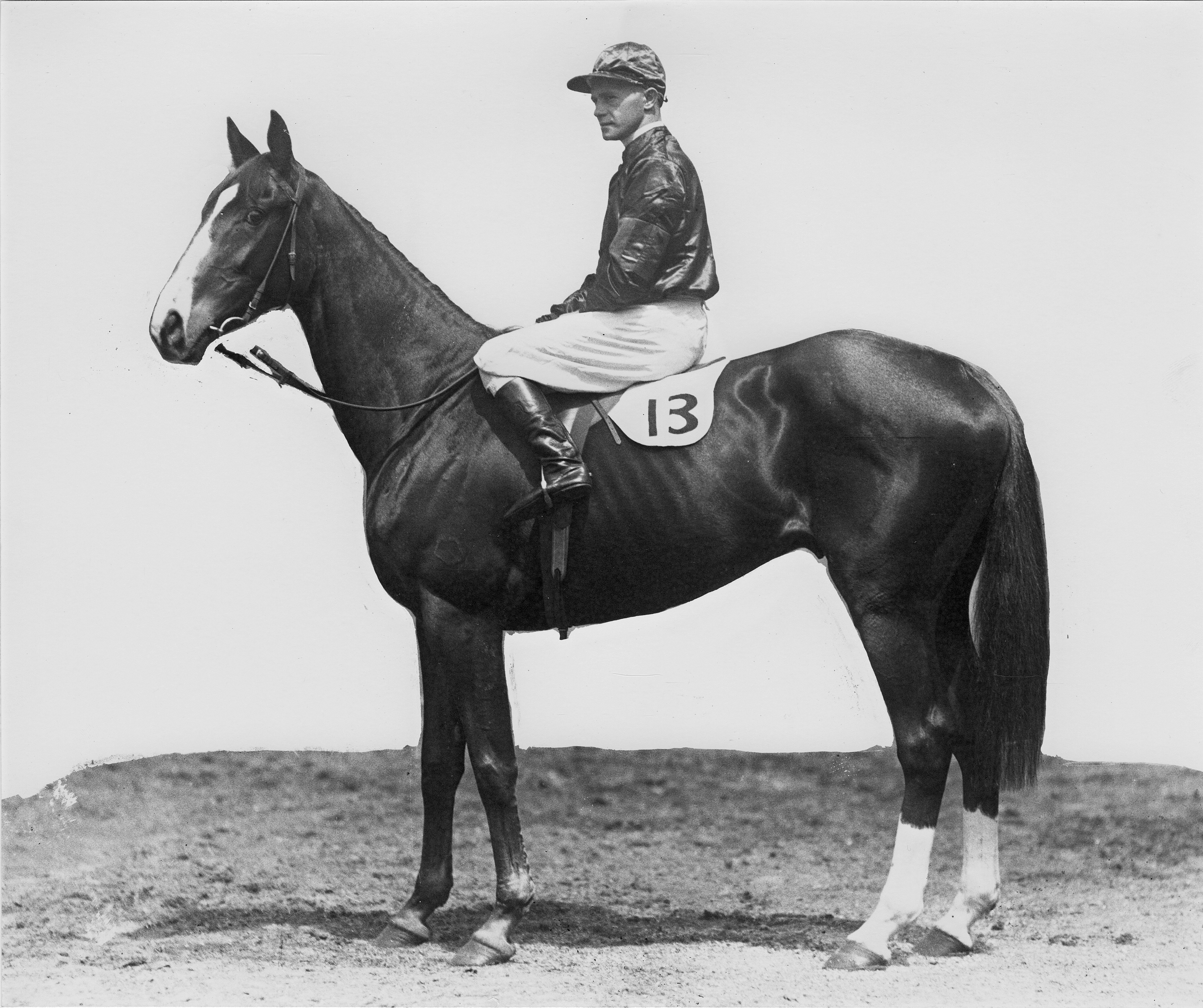
1932 winner – Rogilla George Robinson

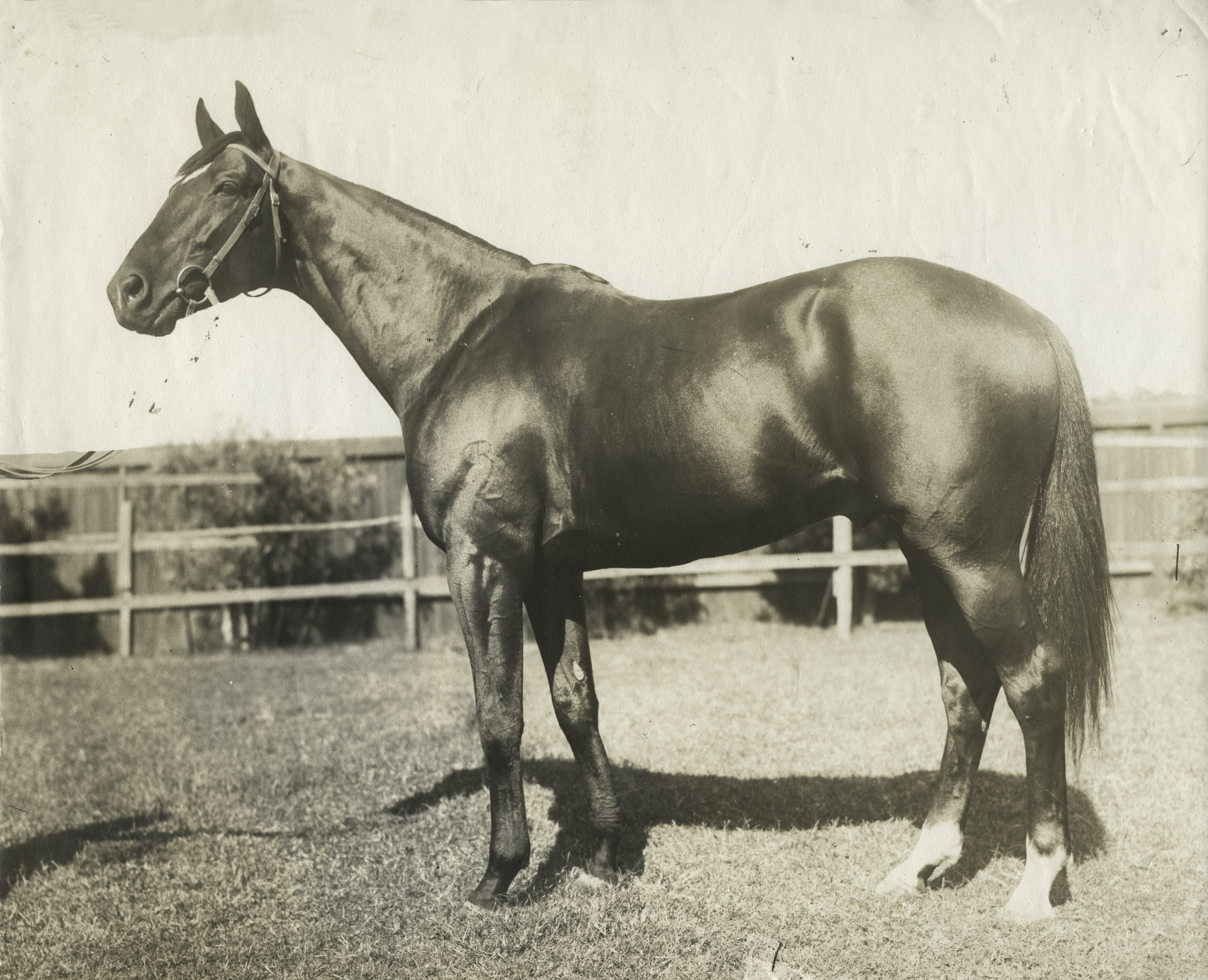
1906 & 1907 winner – Poseidon

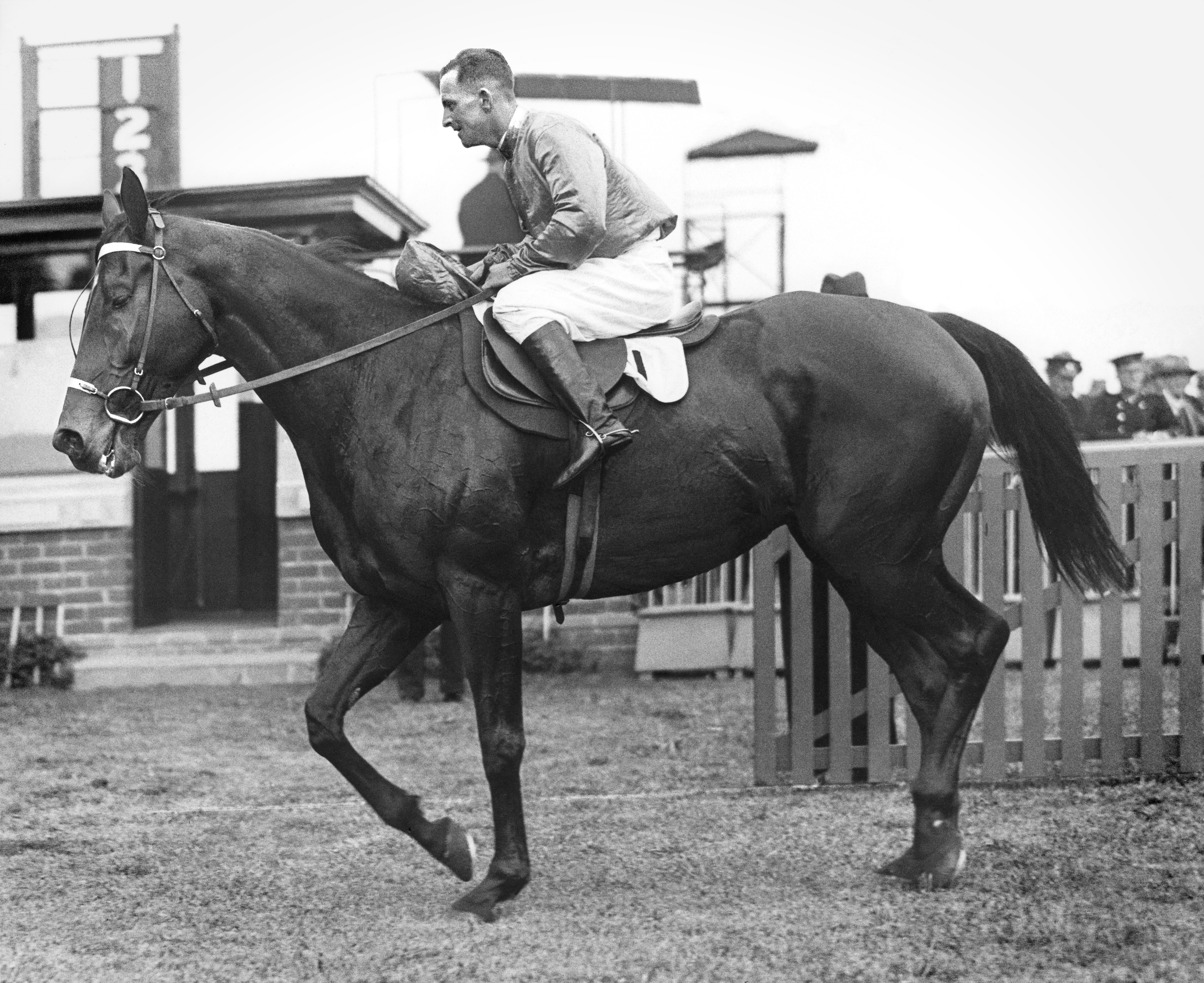
1930 winner – Amounis Harold Jones

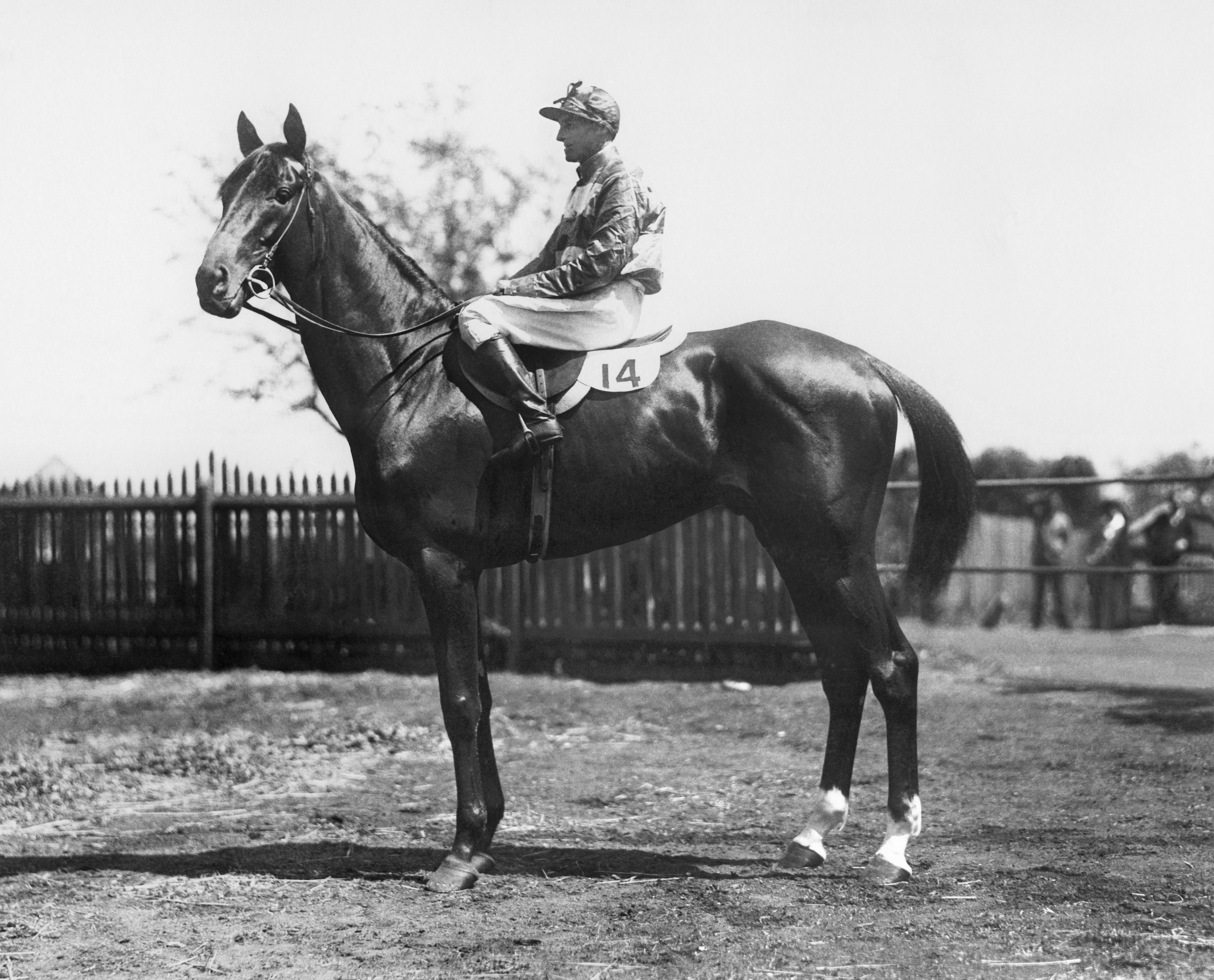
1931 winner – Denis Boy Andy Knox

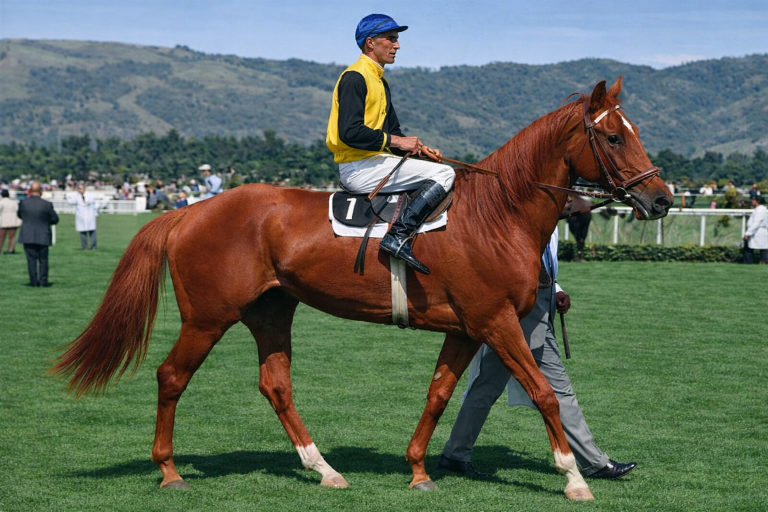
Redcraze, 1956 winner

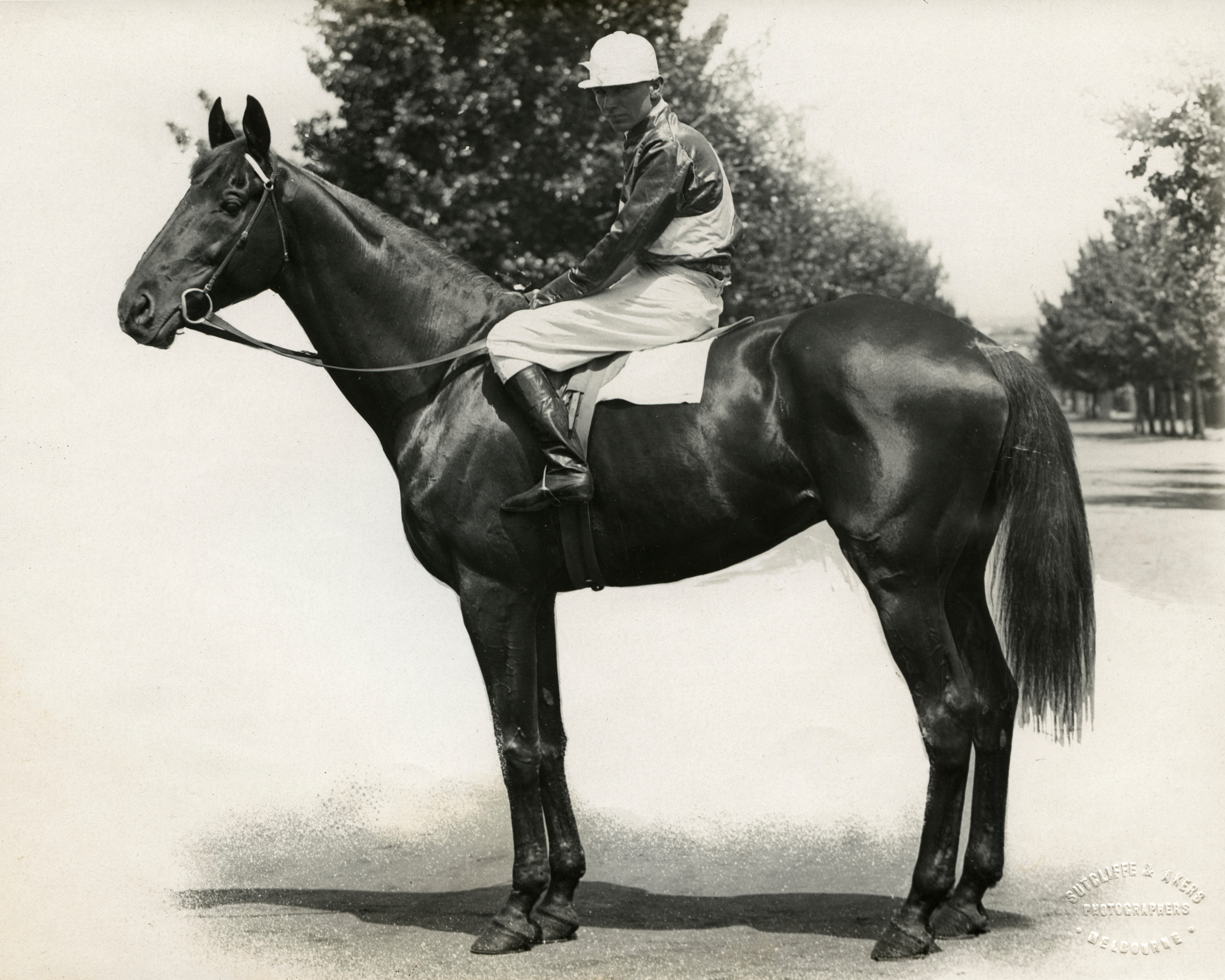
1912 & 1914 winner – Uncle Sam

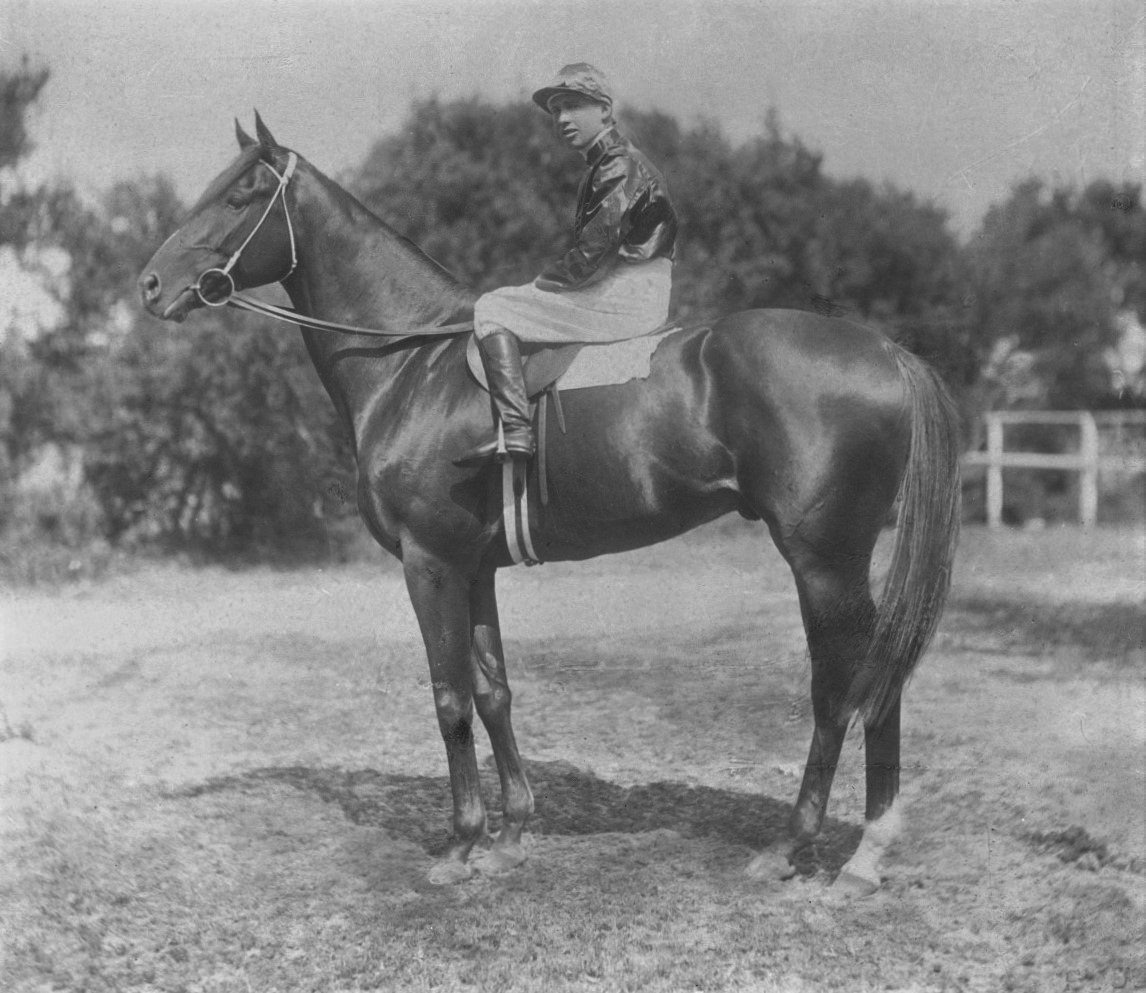
1920 winner – Eurythmic

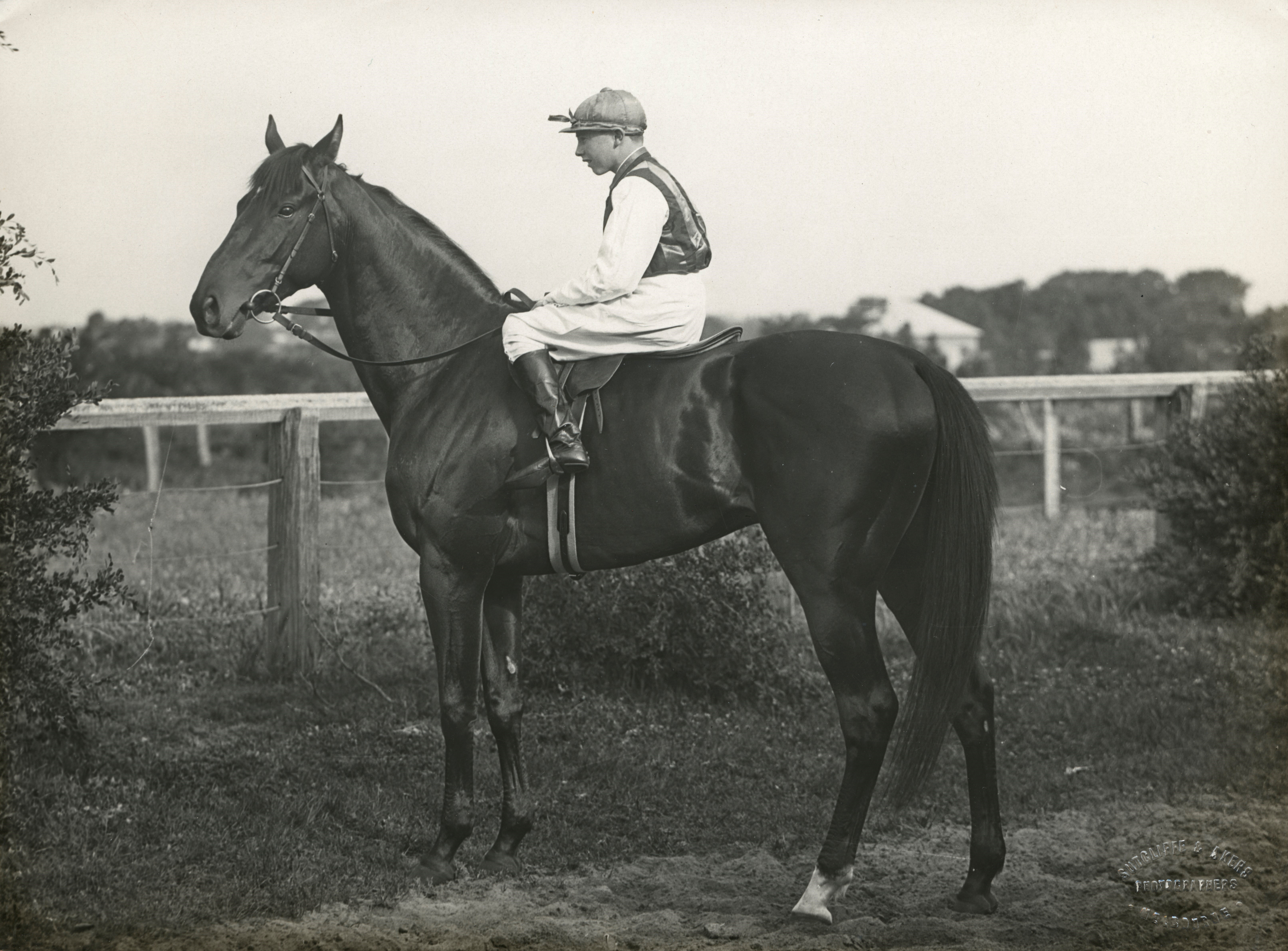
1915 winner – Lavendo

During World War II the race was run at Flemington Racecourse and in 1943 the race was run in divisions.

=== Race qualification ===
The field is limited to 18 starters with four emergency entries which is decided by a ballot system. The prize money, wins and placings in lead up races are among the major factors that determine the eligibility of a horse. Automatic entry is awarded to winners of the Toorak Handicap, Herbert Power Stakes and the Mornington Cup.

=== Sponsors ===
- 1985–1999 - Foster's
- 2000–2005 - Carlton Draught
- 2006–2013 - BMW
- 2014 - Crown Golden Ale
- 2015–2017 - BMW
- 2018–2020 - Stella Artois
- 2021–2023 - Carlton Draught
- 2024–present - Sportsbet

=== Distance ===
- 1879–1971 - 1 1/2 miles (~2400 metres)
- 1972 onwards - 2400 metres

=== Grade ===
- 1879–1978 - Principal Race
- 1979 onwards - Group 1

=== Dual winners ===
The following thoroughbreds have won two Caulfield Cups.

- Paris (1892, 1894), Hymettus (1898, 1901), Poseidon (1906–07), Uncle Sam (1912, 1914), Whittier (1922, 1925), Rising Fast (1954–1955) and Ming Dynasty (1977, 1980).

=== Caulfield-Melbourne Cup double wins ===
The following thoroughbreds have won the Caulfield-Melbourne Cup double in the same year.

- Poseidon (1906), The Trump (1937), Rivette (1939), Rising Fast (1954), Even Stevens (1962), Galilee (1966), Gurner's Lane (1982), Let’s Elope (1991), Doriemus (1995), Might and Power (1997), Ethereal (2001), Without A Fight (2023) and Half Yours (2025).

=== Caulfield Cup-Cox Plate double wins ===
The following thoroughbreds have won the Caulfield Cup-Cox Plate double in the same year.

- Tranquil Star (1906), Rising Fast (1954), Tobin Bronze (1967) and Northerly (2002).

=== Caulfield Cup-Cox Plate-Melbourne Cup triple wins ===
The following thoroughbreds have won the Caulfield Cup-Cox Plate-Melbourne Cup triple in the same year.

- Rising Fast (1954).

=== Notable runnings ===
- Australian Test cricketer Clem Hill was the handicapper for the Victoria Amateur Turf Club (VATC) and responsible for setting the weights for the Caulfield Cup from 1937 to 1943.
- Jockey Scobie Breasley rode the winner of four consecutive Caulfield Cups from 1942 to 1945. This included a division of the 1943 race, which was run in two divisions. He also holds the record for most wins by a jockey of the race - five wins.
- Trainer Bart Cummings holds the record for training Caulfield Cup winners with seven - Galilee, Big Philou, Leilani, Ming Dynasty (twice), Let's Elope and Viewed.
- 2014 Caulfield Cup winner Admire Rakti died after his run in the Melbourne Cup from natural causes.
- Horses trained outside Australia and New Zealand have been participating in the race since 1998. Six have won the race. They are Taufan's Melody (1998) for British trainer Lady Herries, All the Good (2008) and Best Solution (2018) for Saeed bin Suroor of the Godolphin stables, Dunaden (2012) for French trainer Mikel Delzangles, Admire Rakti (2014) for Japanese trainer Tomoyuki Umeda and Mer De Glace (2019) for Japanese trainer Hisashi Shimizu.
- The worst race fall in Australian history occurred at the 1885 Caulfield Cup when 15 of the 44 horses competing fell as they turned onto the straight, resulting in the death of 25-year-old jockey Donald Nicolson.
- In 2007, Maldivian and Eskimo Queen were late scratchings. Maldivian, shortest price favourite for 41 years, misbehaved and injured himself in the starting stalls, frightening second priced favourite Eskimo Queen who for a time was trapped beneath the stalls. The race started almost nine minutes late.
- The 2026 Caulfield Cup was marred by a two-horse fall involving former Caulfield/Melbourne Cup double winner Half Yours and Ohope Wins. Ohope Wins was euthanized on-site, while Half Yours was able to return to the mounting yard. Both jockeys involved, Mark Zahra and Jye McNeil, were reportedly okay, although both were taken to hospital for assessment as a precaution. The cause of the fall has yet to be determined.

=== 1924 and 1934 racebooks ===
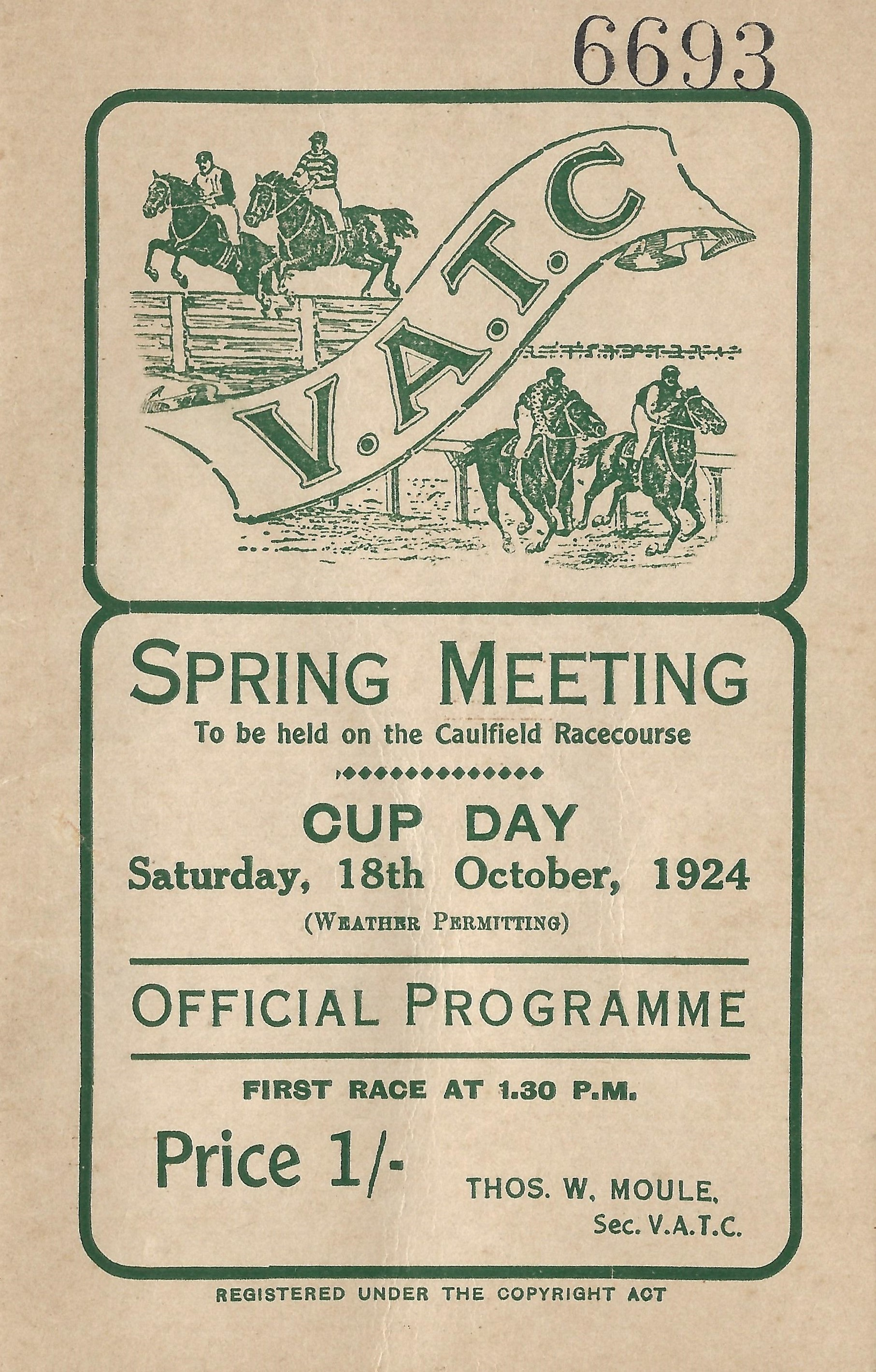
1924 VATC Caulfield Cup racebook front cover

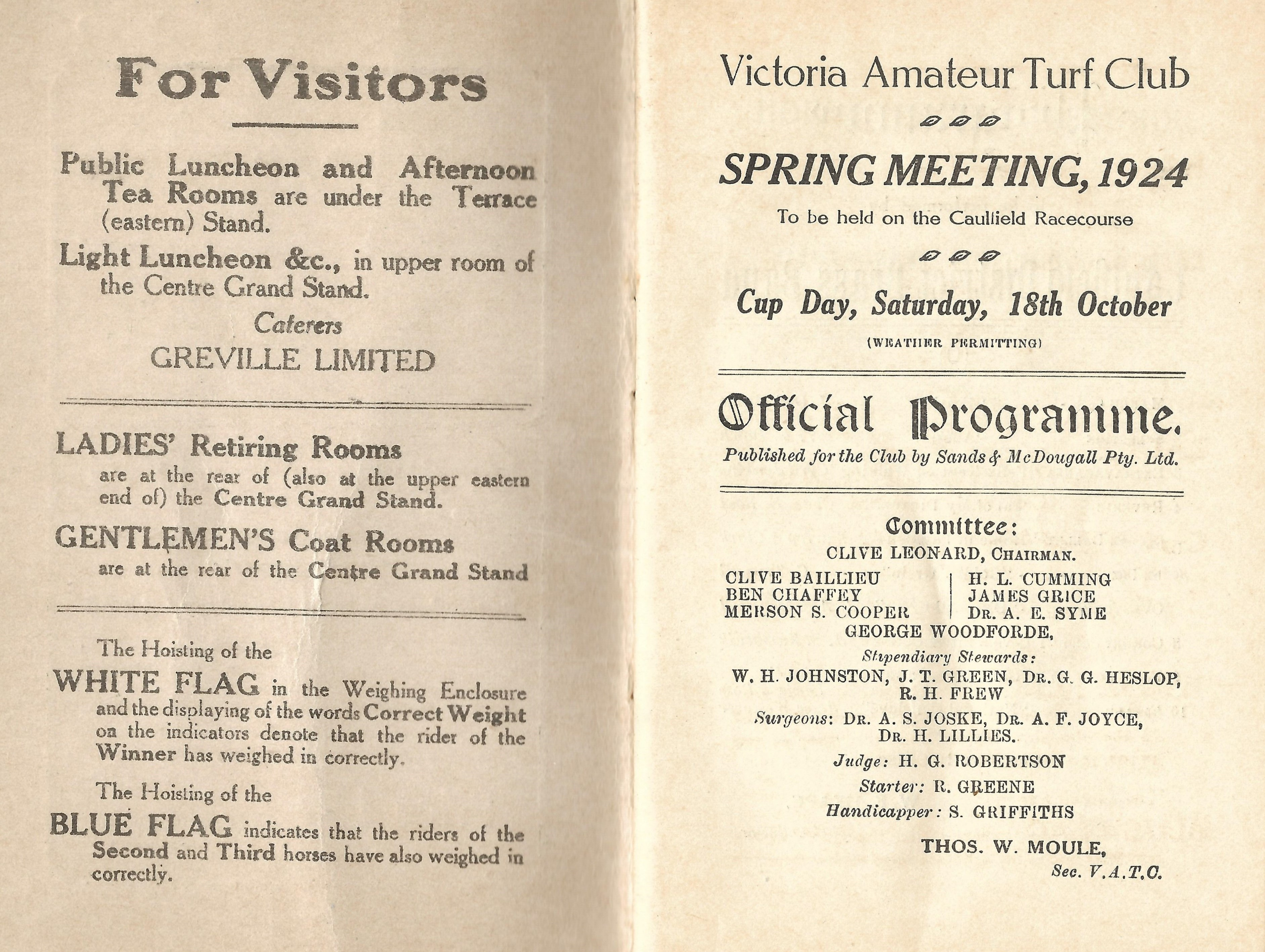
1924 VATC Caulfield Cup showing raceday officials

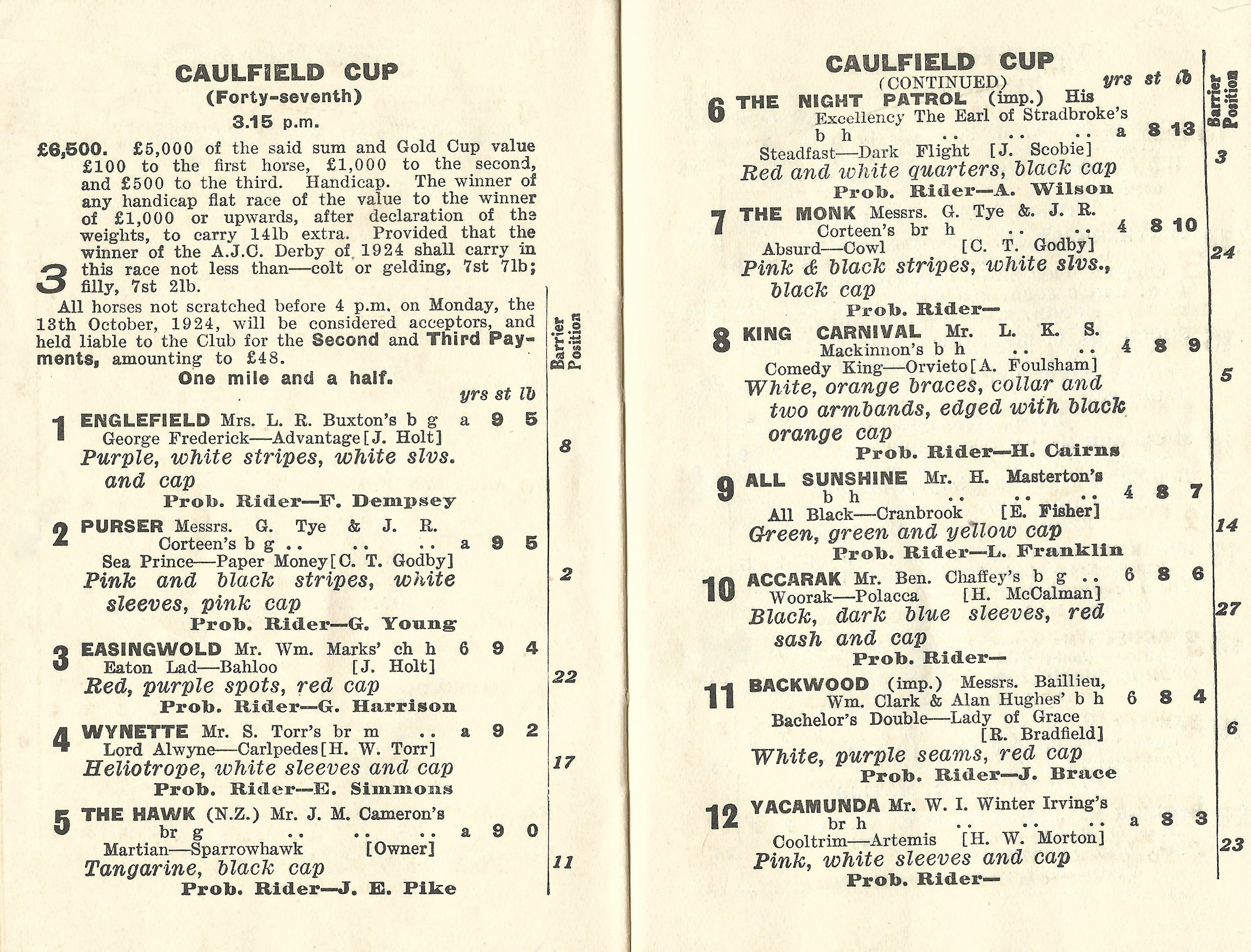
1924 VATC Caulfield Cup starters and results showing the winner, Purser

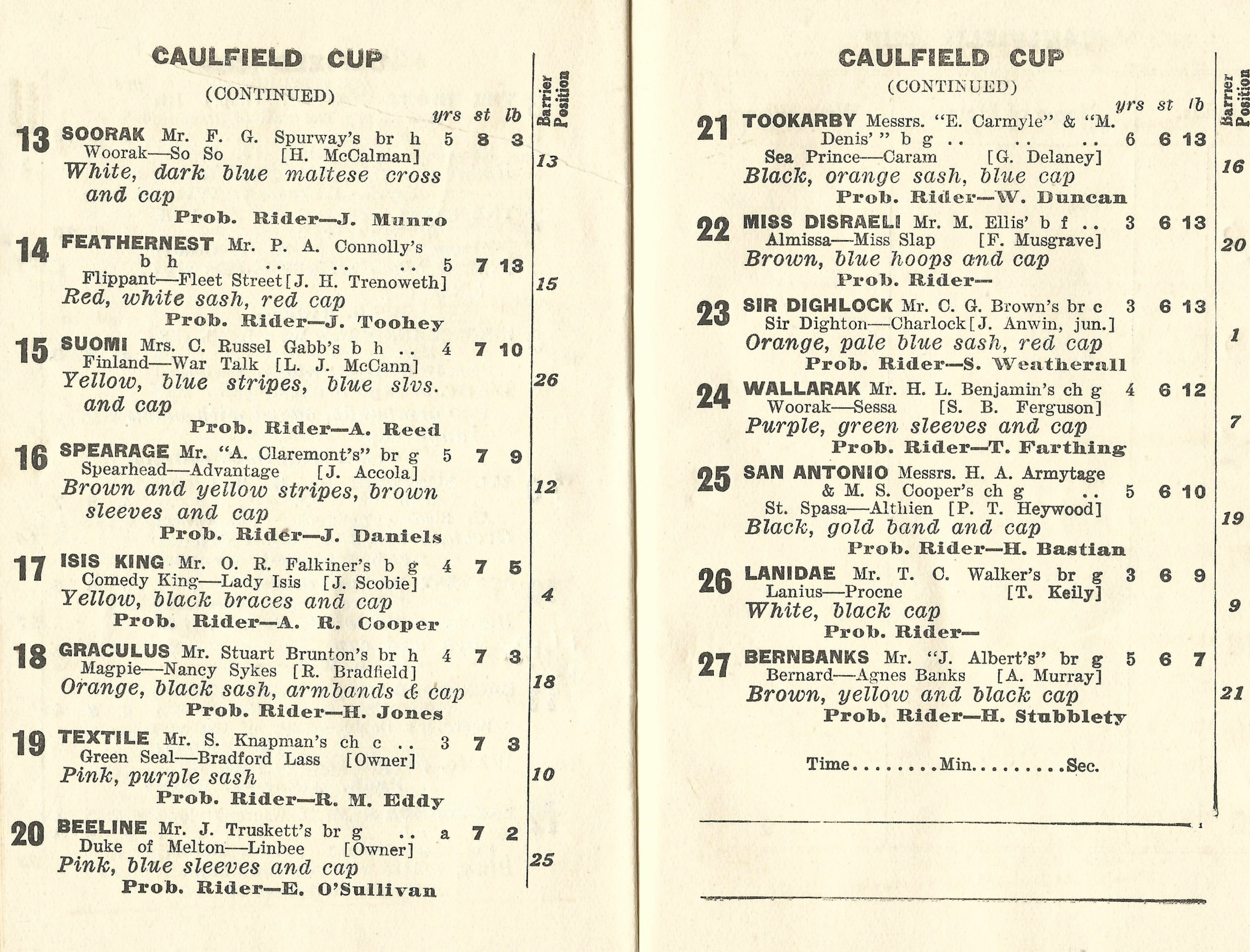
1924 VATC Caulfield Cup starters and results

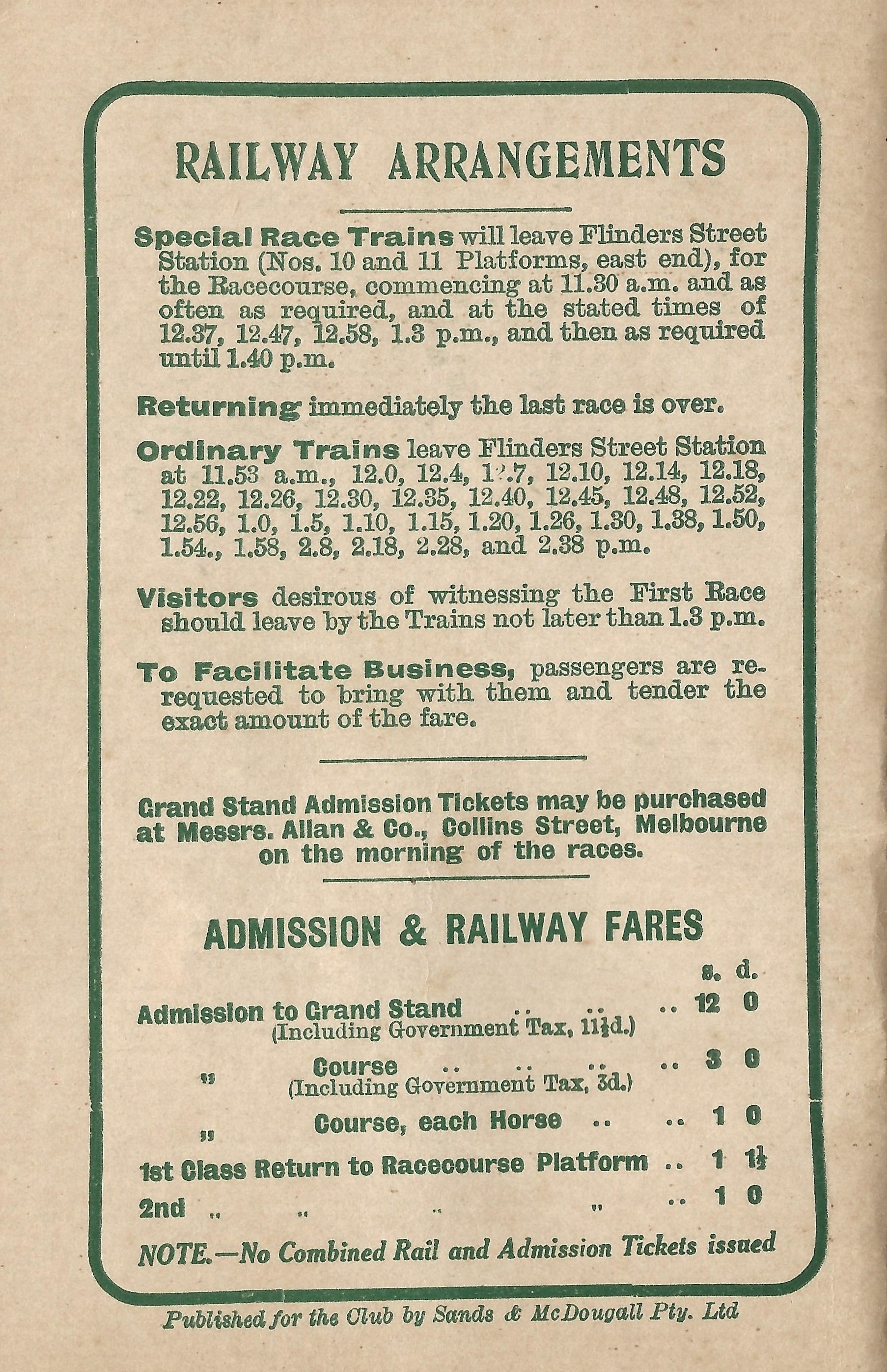
Back cover showing entrance gate and railway charges

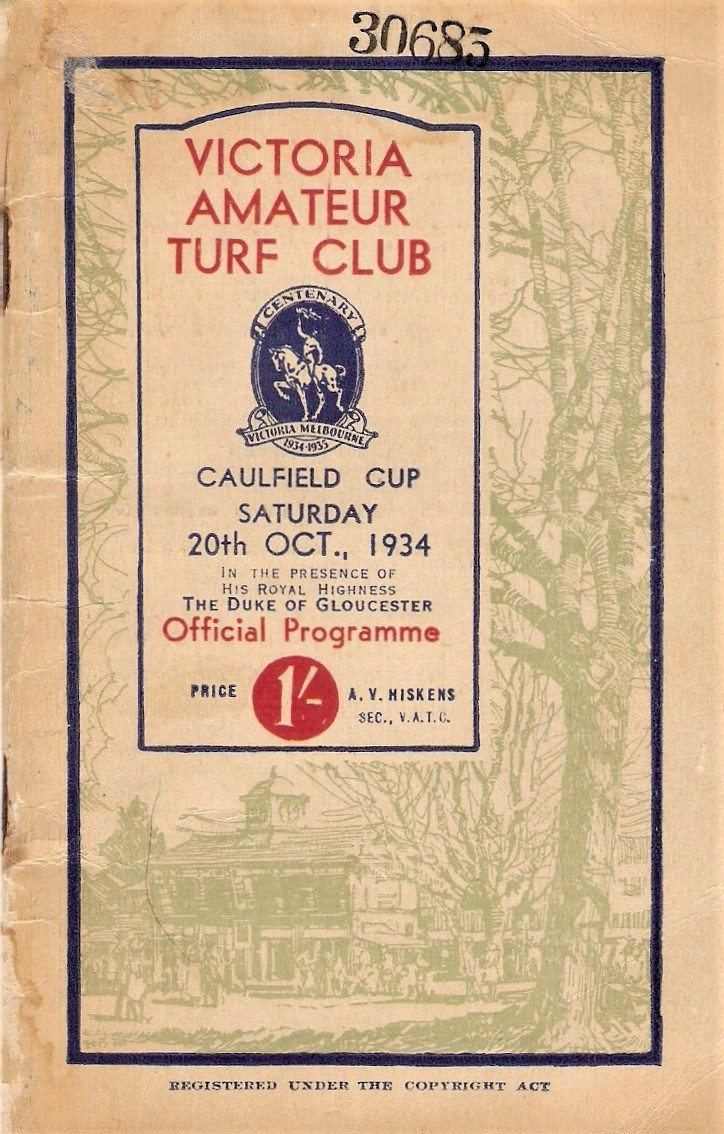
1934 VATC Caulfield Cup racebook front cover

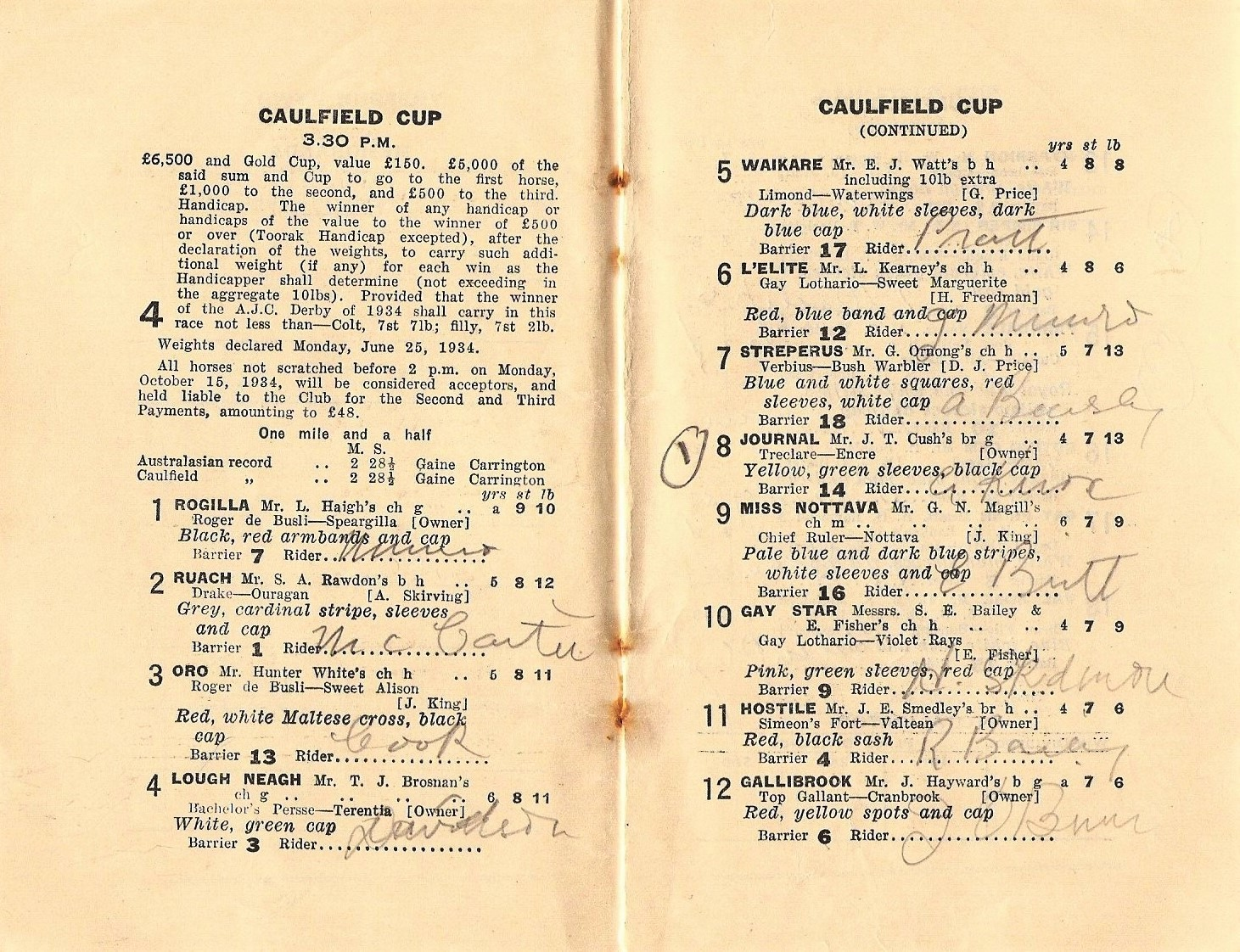
1934 VATC Caulfield Cup starters and results showing the winner, Journal

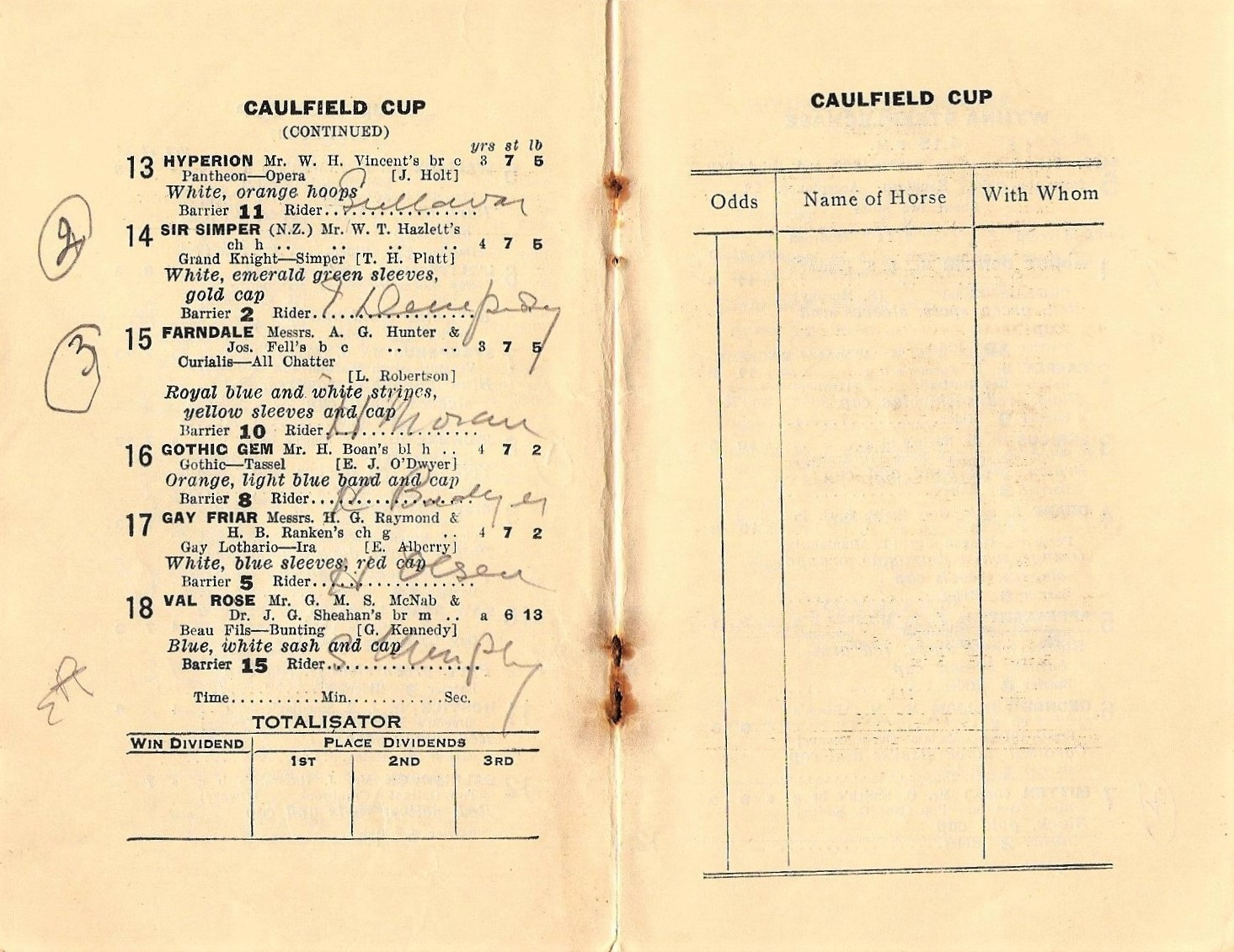
1934 VATC Caulfield Cup starters and results

=== 1950 and 1951 racebooks ===
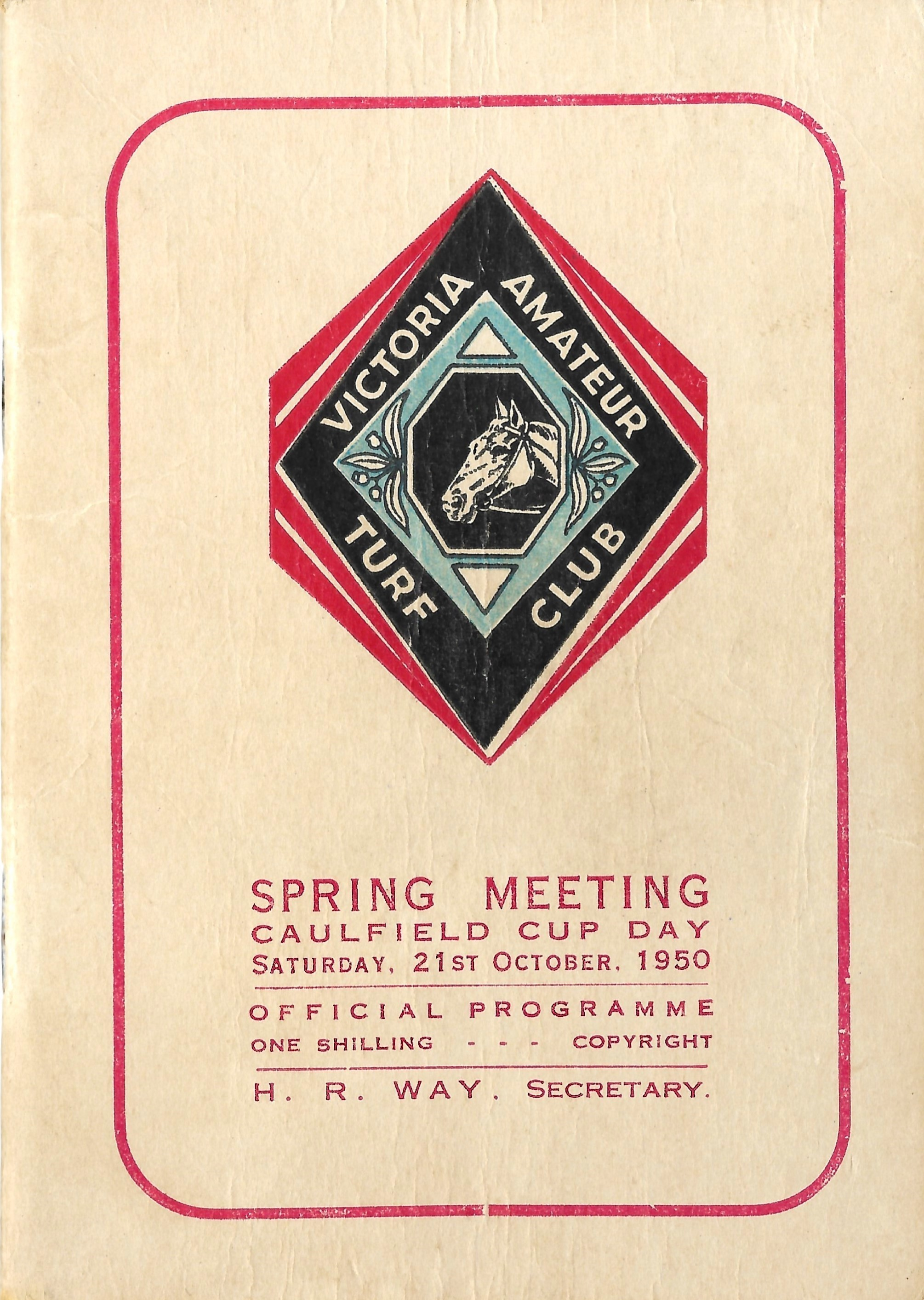
1950 VATC Caulfield Cup racebook front cover

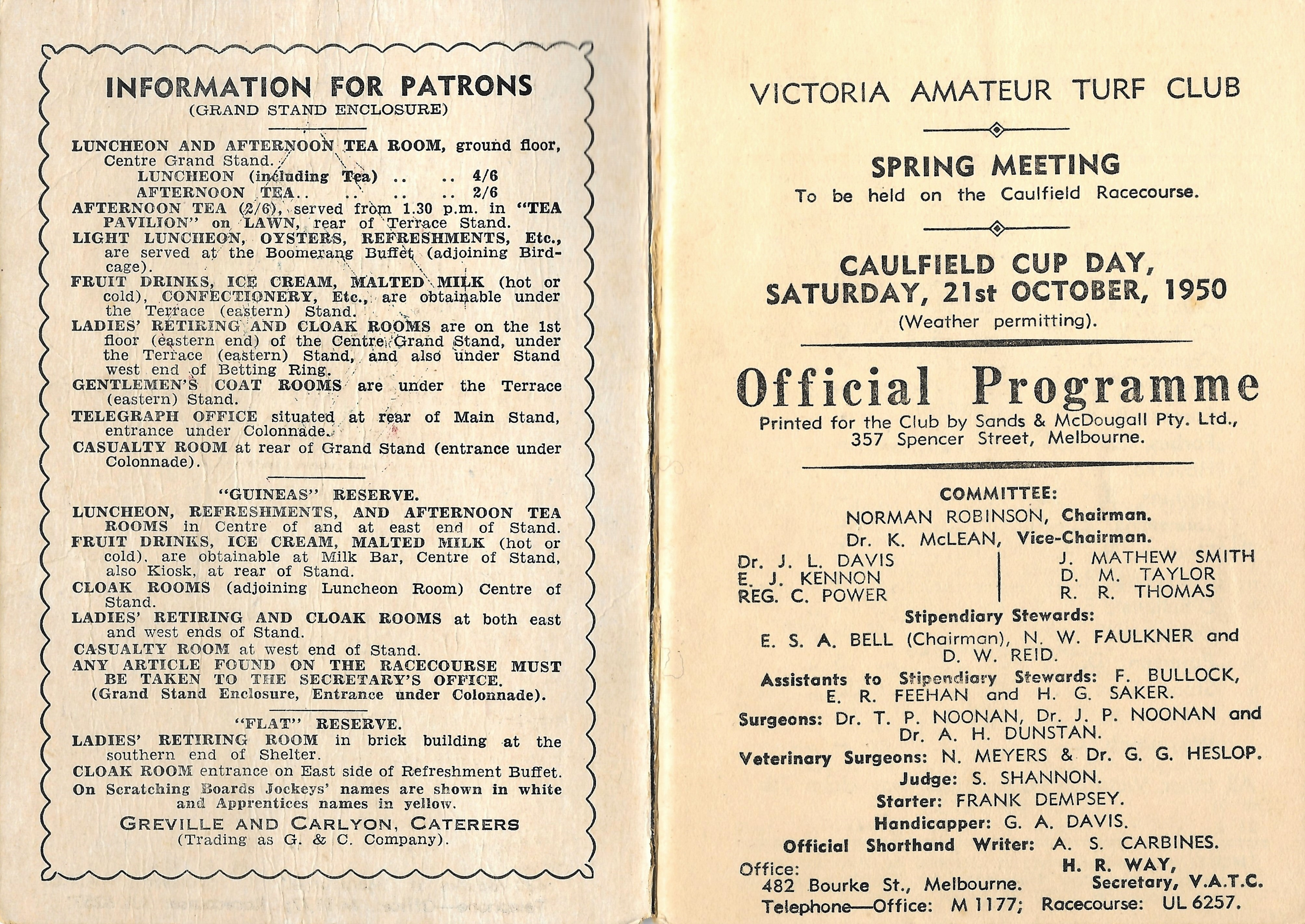
1950 VATC Caulfield Cup showing raceday officials

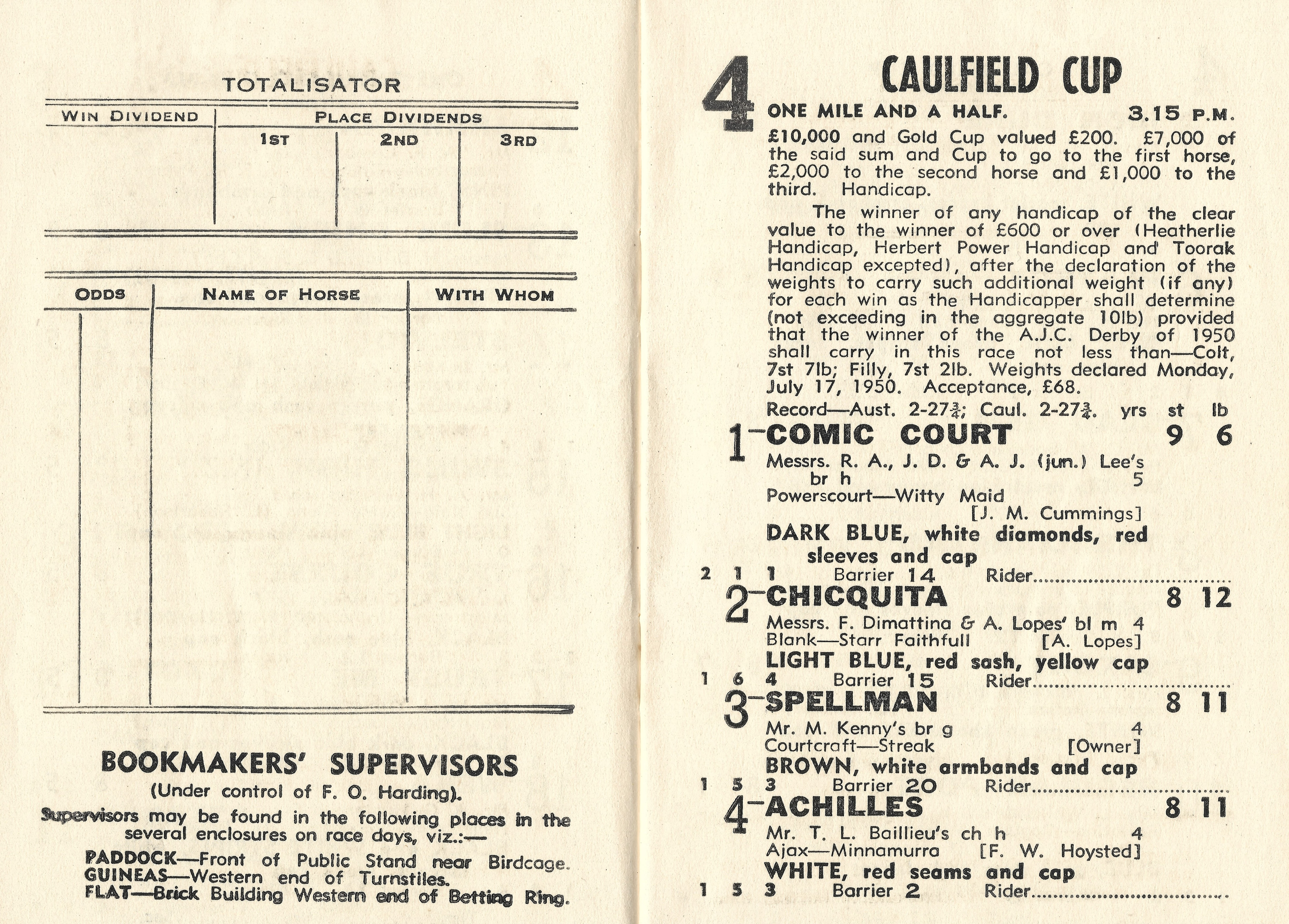
1950 VATC Caulfield Cup showing starters & results

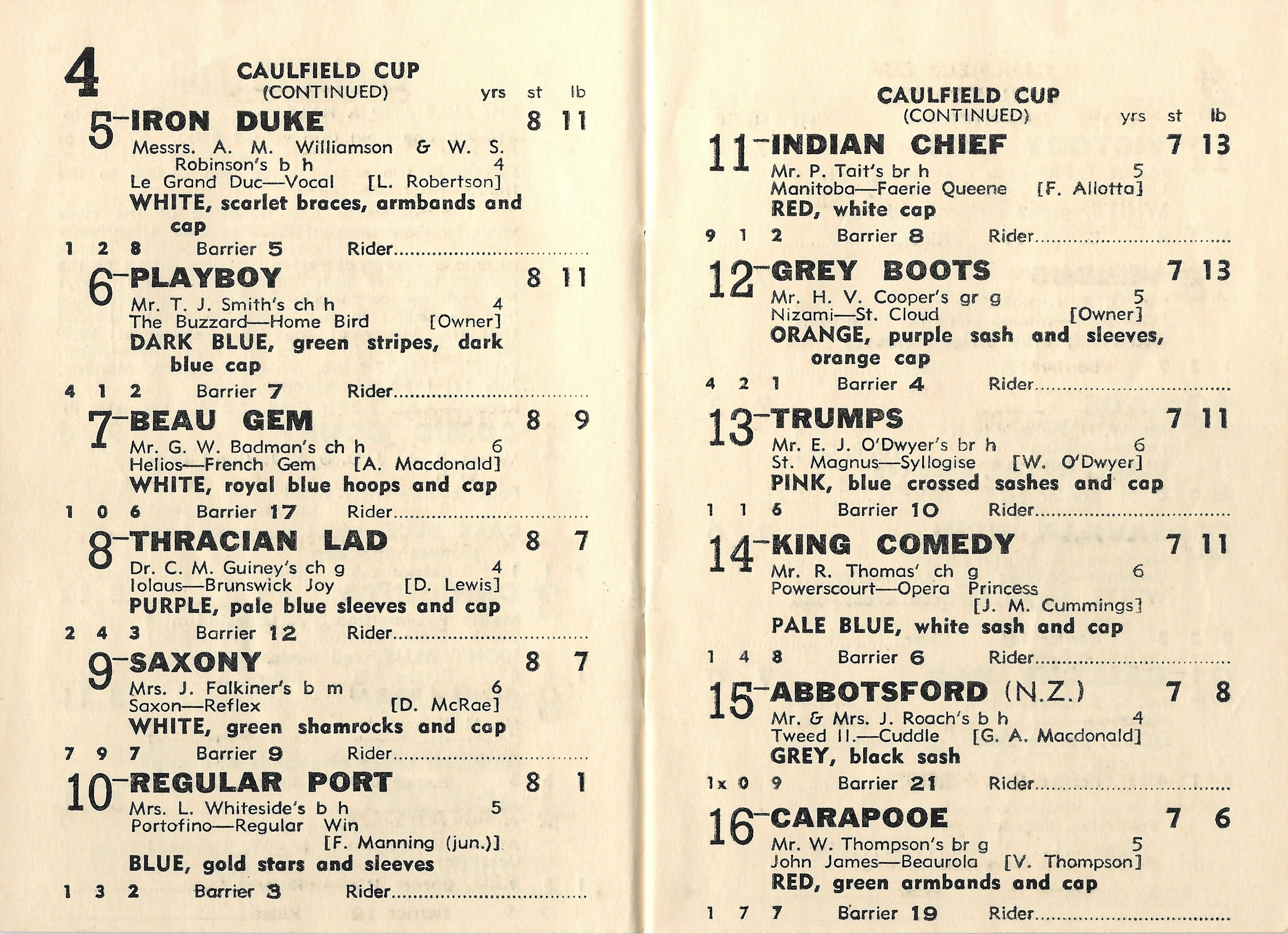
1950 VATC Caulfield Cup showing the winner, Grey Boots

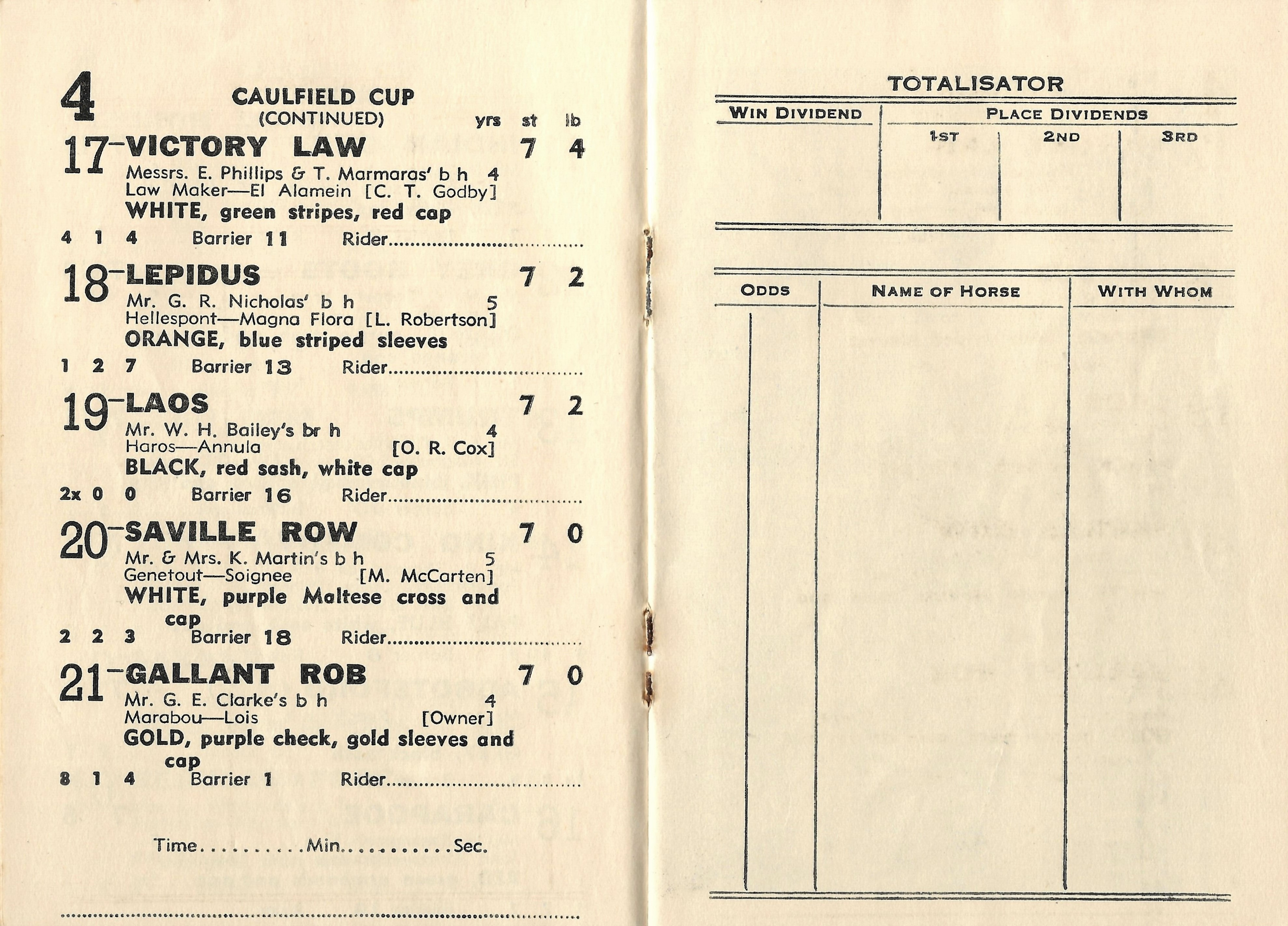
1950 VATC Caulfield Cup showing starters & results

1951 VATC Caulfield Cup showing starters & results

1951 VATC Caulfield Cup showing the winner, Basha Felika

1951 VATC Caulfield Cup showing starters & results

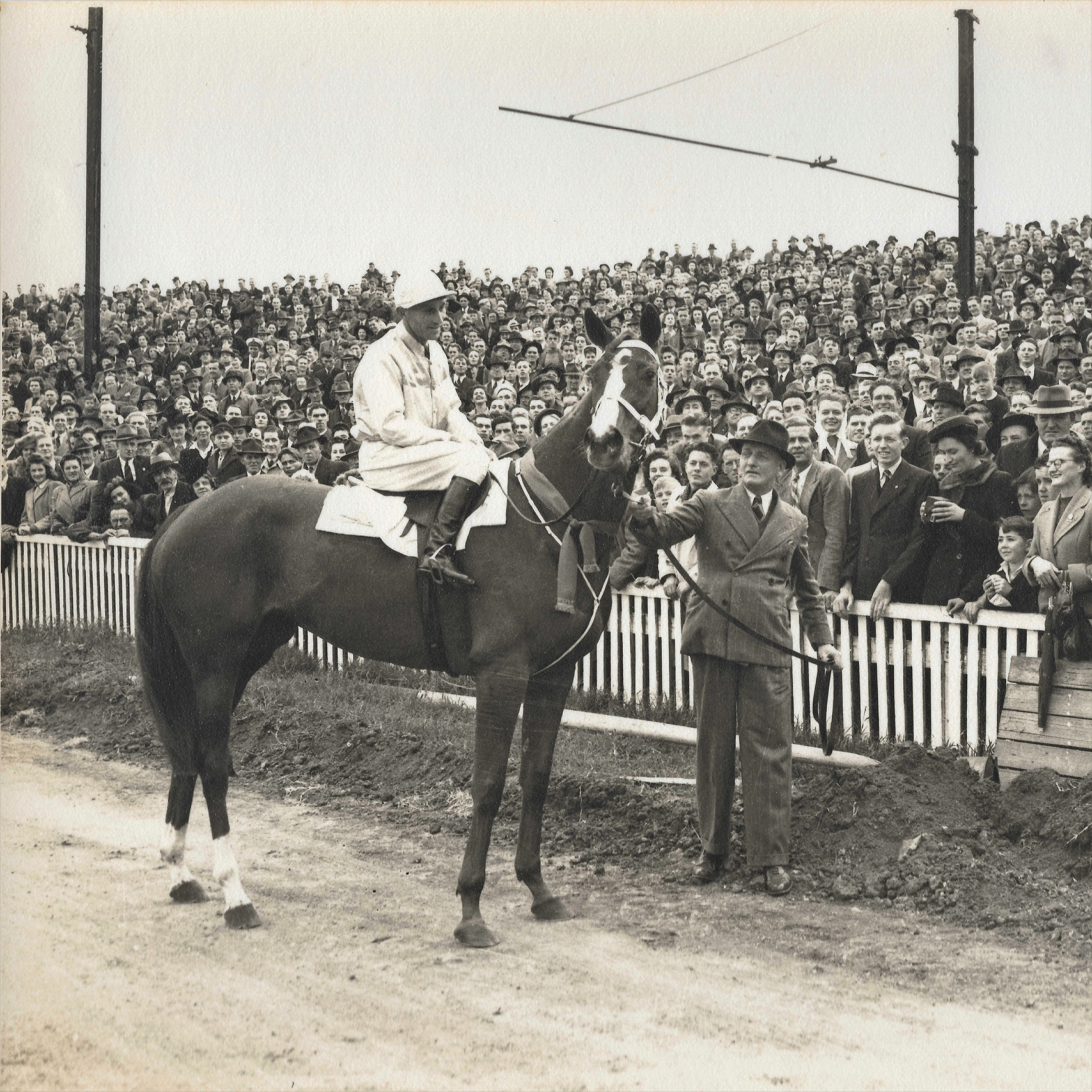
Tranquil Star, 1942 winner

== Winners since 1988 ==
The following are past winners of the race.

Year	Winner	Jockey	Trainer	Time
2026	Kingswood	John Allen	Gavin Bedggood	2:28.21
2025	Half Yours	Jamie Melham	Tony & Calvin McEnvoy	2:29.05
2024	Duke De Sessa	Harry Coffey	Ciaron Maher	2:31.42
2023	Without A Fight	Mark Zahra	Anthony & Sam Freedman	2:26.45
2022	Durston	Michael Dee	Chris Waller	2:33.68
2021	Incentivise	Brett Prebble	Peter Moody	2:30.88
2020	Verry Elleegant	Mark Zahra	Chris Waller	2:31.97
2019	Mer De Glace	Damian Lane	Hisashi Shimizu	2:30.16
2018	Best Solution	Pat Cosgrave	Saeed bin Suroor	2.33.72
2017	Boom Time	Cory Parish	David and Ben Hayes & Tom Dabernig	2:27.66
2016	Jameka	Nicholas Hall	Ciaron Maher	2:28.88
2015	Mongolian Khan	Opie Bosson	Murray Baker	2:27.76
2014	Admire Rakti	Zac Purton	Tomoyuki Yumeda	2:32.12
2013	Fawkner	Nicholas Hall	Robert Hickmott	2:29.10
2012	Dunaden	Craig Williams	Mikel Delzangles	2:28.82
2011	Southern Speed	Craig Williams	Leon MacDonald & Andrew Gluyas	2:28.44
2010	Descarado	Chris Munce	Gai Waterhouse	2:35.69
2009	Viewed	Brad Rawiller	Bart Cummings	2:29.70
2008	All The Good	Kerrin McEvoy	Saeed bin Suroor	2:27.45
2007	Master O'Reilly	Vlad Duric	Danny O'Brien	2:26.15
2006	Tawqeet	Dwayne Dunn	David Hayes	2:27.69
2005	Railings	Greg Childs	John Hawkes	2:27.96
2004	Elvstroem	Nash Rawiller	Tony Vasil	2:31.37
2003	Mummify	Danny Nikolic	Lee Freedman	2:25.98
2002	Northerly	Greg Childs	Fred R. Kersley	2:30.38
2001	Ethereal	Scott Seamer	Sheila Laxon	2:30.93
2000	Diatribe	Jim Cassidy	George Hanlon	2:25.32
1999	Sky Heights	Damien Oliver	Colin Alderson	2:30.10
1998	Taufan's Melody	Ray Cochrane	Lady Herries	2:30.16
1997	Might And Power	Jim Cassidy	Jack Denham	2:26.20
1996	Arctic Scent	Brent Stanley	Jim Mason	2:30.27
1995	Doriemus	Damien Oliver	Lee Freedman	2:28.10
1994	Paris Lane	Damien Oliver	Lee Freedman	2:26.50
1993	Fraar	Peter Hutchinson	David Hayes	2:28.00
1992	Mannerism	Damien Oliver	Lee Freedman	2:34.90
1991	Let's Elope	Steven King	Bart Cummings	2:30.30
1990	Sydeston	Mick Dittman	Bob Hoysted	2:31.60
1989	Cole Diesel	Michael Kerr	Greg Mance	2:27.20
1988	Imposera	Brian York	Ross McDonald	2:29.40

== Earlier winners ==
- 1987 – Lord Reims
- 1986 – Mr. Lomondy
- 1985 – Tristarc
- 1984 – Affinity
- 1983 – Hayai
- 1982 – Gurner's Lane
- 1981 – Silver Bounty
- 1980 – Ming Dynasty
- 1979 – Mighty Kingdom
- 1978 – Taksan
- 1977 – Ming Dynasty
- 1976 – How Now
- 1975 – Analight
- 1974 – Leilani
- 1973 – Swell Time
- 1972 – Sobar
- 1971 – Gay Icarus
- 1970 – Beer Street
- 1969 – ¶ Big Philou
- 1968 – Bunratty Castle
- 1967 – Tobin Bronze
- 1966 – Galilee
- 1965 – Bore Head
- 1964 – Yangtze
- 1963 – Sometime
- 1962 – Even Stevens
- 1961 – Summer Fair
- 1960 – Ilumquh
- 1959 – Regal Wench
- 1958 – Sir Blink
- 1957 – Tulloch
- 1956 – Redcraze
- 1955 – Rising Fast
- 1954 – Rising Fast
- 1953 – My Hero
- 1952 – Peshawar
- 1951 – Basha Felika
- 1950 – Grey Boots
- 1949 – Lincoln
- 1948 – Red Fury
- 1947 – Columnist
- 1946 – Royal Gem
- 1945 – St. Fairy
- 1944 – Counsel
- 1943 – † Saint Warden / Skipton
- 1942 – Tranquil Star
- 1941 – Velocity
- 1940 – Beaulivre
- 1939 – Rivette
- 1938 – Buzalong
- 1937 – The Trump
- 1936 – Northwind
- 1935 – Palfresco
- 1934 – Journal
- 1933 – Gaine Carrington
- 1932 – Rogilla
- 1931 – Denis Boy
- 1930 – Amounis
- 1929 – High Syce
- 1928 – Maple
- 1927 – Textile
- 1926 – Manfred
- 1925 – Whittier
- 1924 – Purser
- 1923 – Wynette
- 1922 – Whittier
- 1921 – Violoncello
- 1920 – Eurythmic
- 1919 – Lucknow
- 1918 – King Offa
- 1917 – Bronzetti
- 1916 – Shepherd King
- 1915 – Lavendo
- 1914 – Uncle Sam
- 1913 – Aurifer
- 1912 – Uncle Sam
- 1911 – Lady Medallist
- 1910 – Flavinius
- 1909 – ‡ Blue Book / Aborigine
- 1908 – Maranui
- 1907 – Poseidon
- 1906 – Poseidon
- 1905 – Marvel Loch
- 1904 – Murmur
- 1903 – Sweet Nell
- 1902 – Lieutenant Bill
- 1901 – Hymettus
- 1900 – Ingliston
- 1899 – Dewey
- 1898 – Hymettus
- 1897 – Amberite
- 1896 – Cremorne
- 1895 – Waterfall
- 1894 – Paris
- 1893 – ¶ Sainfoin
- 1892 – Paris
- 1891 – G'naroo
- 1890 – Vengeance
- 1889 – Boz
- 1888 – Chicago
- 1887 – Oakleigh
- 1886 – Ben Bolt
- 1885 – Grace Darling
- 1884 – Blink Bonny
- 1883 – Calma
- 1882 – Little Jack
- 1881 – Master Avenel
- 1881 – Blue Ribbon
- 1880 – Tom Kirk
- 1879 – Newminster

Key:
† Run in divisions
¶ Won by Protest
‡ Dead heat

== Attendance ==
- 2024 – 25,676
- 2023 – 25,121
- 2022 – 24,289
- 2021 – 0 (no public attendance due to COVID-19 pandemic restrictions)
- 2020 – 0 (no public attendance due to COVID-19 pandemic restrictions)
- 2019 – 28,000
- 2018 – 30,000
- 2017 – 30,000
- 2015 – 30,000
- 2014 – 32,000
- 2013 – 33,056
- 2012 – 35,500
- 2011 – 30,097
- 2010 – 23,697
- 2009 – 43,210
- 2008 – 51,328
- 2007 – 48,529
- 2006 – 47,551
- 2005 – 52,000
- 2004 – 51,015
- 2003 – 46,873

== Sponsorship ==
In March 2015, BMW Australia and the Melbourne Racing Club announced a reunion in partnership, effective as of August 1, 2015 after the eight-year partnership ended in 2014.

== See also ==
- Caulfield Classic
- Caulfield Sprint
- Ethereal Stakes
- Moonga Stakes
- The Thousand Guineas
- Tristarc Stakes
- List of Australian Group races
- Group races
