= Ben Melham =

Australian jockey

Ben Melham (born 1988) is an Australian jockey based in Victoria.

From Ballarat, where he attended St Patrick's College, Melham began riding professionally in 2003, and reached 100 winners in a season for the first time in 2010/11. He rode his first Group One winner in November 2010 on Black Caviar in the Patinack Farm Classic at Flemington; it was also Black Caviar's first Group One victory. As of early July 2025, he has ridden 1,409 winners, including 22 in Group One races.

Melham has three children with his former partner Karlie Dales. In January 2025 he married fellow jockey Jamie Kah at Rosemont Stud in Gnarwarre, Victoria.
