= Michelle Payne =

Australian jockey (born 1985)

Michelle Payne OAM
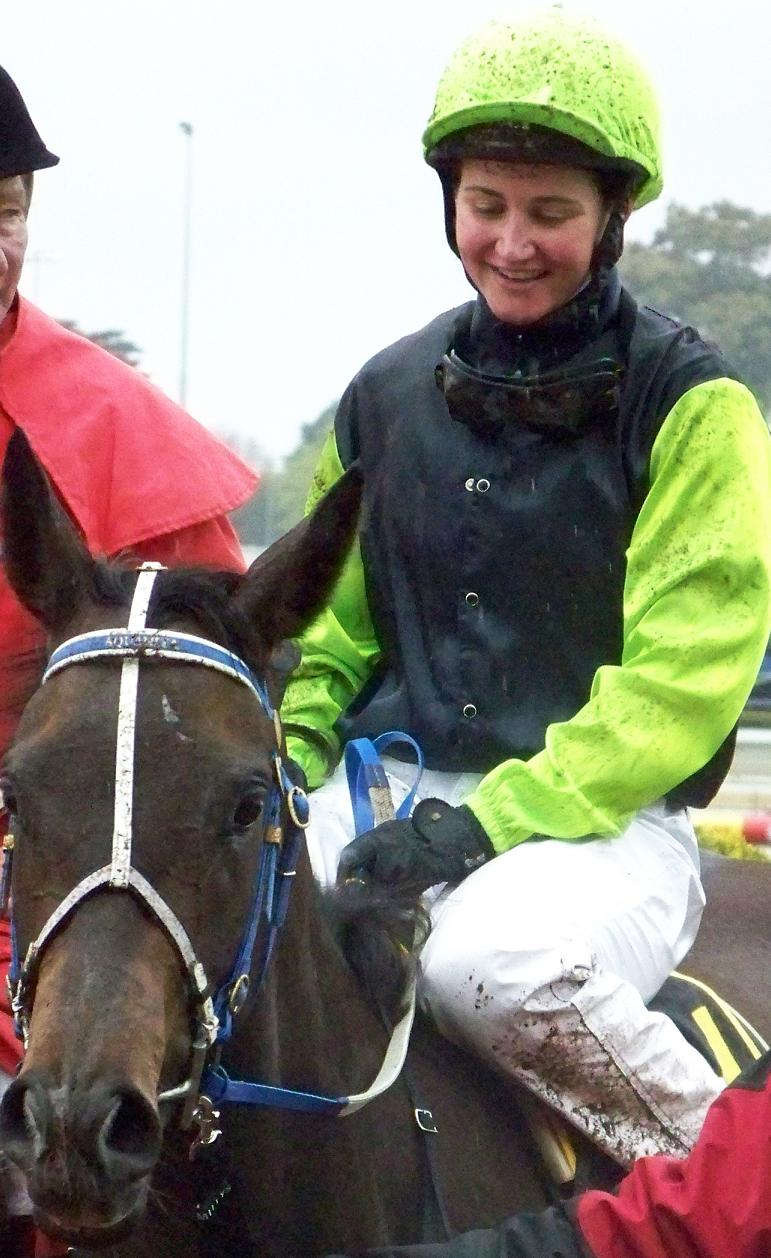
- Michelle Payne on Yosei, upon winning the 2010 Thousand Guineas at Caulfield

Personal information
- Born: 29 September 1985 (age 41) Ballarat, Victoria, Australia
- Occupation: Trainer
- Weight: 50.5 kg (7.95 st; 111 lb)
- Website: www.michellejpayne.com.au

Horse racing career
- Sport: Horse racing
- Career wins: 779

Major racing wins
- Toorak Handicap (2009) - Allez Wonder; Sires' Produce Stakes (2010) - Yosei; The Thousand Guineas (2010) - Yosei; Tattersall's Tiara (2011) - Yosei; Melbourne Cup (2015) - Prince of Penzance

Racing awards
- The Don Award (2017), Sport Australia Hall of Fame Awards; Longines Ladies Award (2017)

Michelle J. Payne (born 29 September 1985) is a retired Australian jockey. She won the 2015 Melbourne Cup, riding Prince of Penzance, and is the first female jockey to win the event.

== Early life ==
The youngest of ten children of Paddy and Mary Payne, (Note: Paddy Payne Sr (died 8 September 2026) and Mary Payne (died 1986) are remembered as progenitors of a famous racing family: eight of their ten children became horse racing professionals. Michelle's brother Patrick is a jockey and trainer; sisters Brigid (died 2007) and Bernadette (died 2025) were both jockeys.) Payne grew up on a farm at Miners Rest, a locality near Ballarat in central Victoria, Australia. Of Irish descent, her parents had emigrated to Australia from New Zealand. Her mother Mary died in a motor vehicle crash when Payne was six months old, leaving her father Paddy to raise their ten children as a single father. Payne dreamt of being a winning jockey as a child, and, at the age of seven she told her friends that she would one day win the Melbourne Cup. She attended Our Lady Help of Christians primary school and Loreto College, Ballarat, and entered racing aged 15, the eighth of the Payne children to do so.

== Career ==
She won in her first race at Ballarat, astride Reigning—a horse trained by her father. In March 2004, Payne fell heavily at a race in Sandown Racecourse in Melbourne, fracturing her skull and bruising her brain. As a result of her prolonged recovery period—including a further fall where she fractured her wrist—Payne was granted a three-month extension to her apprenticeship to allow her time to ride out her claim.

Payne won her first Group One race, the Toorak Handicap at Caulfield Racecourse aboard Allez Wonder on 10 October 2009, and trainer Bart Cummings offered her the ride at the Caulfield Cup the following week. Payne was the third female jockey to ride in the Caulfield Cup. As a first-timer in the 2009 Melbourne Cup, she rode Cummings' Allez Wonder with a riding weight of 50.5 kg. The horse was placed 16th in the field of 23. In 2010 Payne rode Yosei to victory in the Thousand Guineas at Caulfield.

=== Melbourne Cup 2015 ===
In 2015, she gained national attention when she rode the winning horse in two races at Melbourne Cup carnival at the Flemington Racecourse. One of them was the Hilton Hotels Stakes and the other was the Melbourne Cup itself. Payne said she was "floating on the cloud and it's a nice feeling".

Payne won the Melbourne Cup on 3 November 2015, riding Prince of Penzance, a six-year-old gelding with which she had a long-term association.

The training strategy used in the lead-up to the race included a focus on galloping, and a consistent horse-jockey relationship. "...'you know what?' Payne asked. "It's not all about strength, there is so much more involved, getting the horse to try for you, it's being patient."

"Just want to say to everyone else, can get stuffed, because they think women aren’t strong enough but we just beat the world"

— Michelle Payne (after her win in the Melbourne Cup)

Payne was the first woman to win the Melbourne Cup in its 155-year history. She was also the fourth woman to ride in the race and was coincidentally wearing the colours of the suffragette movement: purple, green and white. In an interview shortly after her Melbourne Cup win, Payne said that horse racing is a "chauvinistic sport". Her short speech about the capability of women in sport was described as "unambiguous and galvanising". She later stated that she hopes her win "helps female jockeys".

The victory was a surprise for bookmakers and speechmakers. The horse, bought for $50,000 (a figure described by sportswriters as "pocket change" for horseflesh) was a long odds chance at 100–1, and afterwards Governor-General Sir Peter Cosgrove and other speechmakers were criticised for failing to adapt their pre-prepared congratulations to acknowledge the historic nature of the win.

=== 2016-2017 seasons ===
In May 2016, Payne suffered severe abdominal injuries in a race fall at Mildura. She underwent urgent surgery for a torn pancreas, with surgeons saving the organ, otherwise she would have become a diabetic. She returned to racing in September 2016, though noted that her future goals included a move from being a jockey to becoming a trainer.

In October 2016, she was awarded the Don Award at the Sport Australia Hall of Fame awards. The Don Award is "awarded to a sportsperson who, through their achievements and example over the last 12 months, is considered to have most inspired the nation".

In May 2017, Payne received international recognition when awarded the Longines Ladies Award in Washington U.S. The award paid tribute to "distinguished women whose careers have shown a positive influence and exceptional commitment to the equine cause".

On 23 June 2017, Payne was stood down from racing after testing positive for the drug phentermine, an appetite suppressant banned under Australian Rule of Racing 81B. The traces were found in Payne's urine from a test taken on 11 June 2017, at the Swan Hill Cup meeting. Payne faced an inquiry by Racing Victoria stewards on 29 June 2017. Payne pleaded guilty to taking phentermine and was banned for four weeks until 21 July 2017. She said after the investigation, "The onus is 100 per cent with me … I regret not seeking more guidance, I wasn't thorough, and that is completely my fault. My sincere apologies to everyone."

Payne became a trainer. She also speaks at conferences around Australia and internationally.

== Honours ==
Payne was inducted onto the Victorian Honour Roll of Women in 2016. She was awarded the Medal of the Order of Australia in the 2021 Australia Day Honours.

== Legacy ==
In 2019, Payne's victory was made into a feature film, Ride Like a Girl, with Teresa Palmer in the role of Payne and Sam Neill as her father.
