= 2015 Melbourne Cup =

Australian horse race

- Melbourne Cup
- Location: Flemington Racecourse; Melbourne, Australia
- Date: 3 November 2015
- Winning horse: Prince of Penzance
- Starting price: $101
- Jockey: Michelle Payne
- Trainer: Darren Weir
- Surface: Grass
- Attendance: 101,015

Coming past the 300 meters, Excess Knowledge went to the lead narrowly, here's Prince Of Penzance coming on down the outside, Prince of Penzance for Michelle Payne. Now Max Dymanite starts to charge home. Prince of Penzance from Max Dymanite, Prince of Penzance it's history at Flemington, Michelle Payne! Prince of Penzance beat Max Dymanite.

— Commentator Greg Miles describes the climax of the race

The 2015 Emirates Melbourne Cup was the 155th running of the Melbourne Cup, a prestigious Australian Thoroughbred horse race. The race, run over 3,200 metres (1.988 mi), was held on 3 November 2015 at Melbourne's Flemington Racecourse. The date is a public holiday in the state of Victoria. The final field for the race was declared on 31 October. The total prize money for the race was A$6.2 million, the same as the previous year.

The winner was Prince of Penzance, ridden by Michelle Payne, who became the first female jockey to win the Melbourne Cup. He was trained by Darren Weir, who has since been banned from horseracing & charged with animal cruelty offences.

Max Dynamite ran second and Criterion third.

== Background ==
Prior to the race, racehorse advocacy groups and animal rights activists attempted to highlight the number of racehorse deaths due to injuries sustained during a race. The deaths of two horses in Melbourne Cup 2014 race has called into question the use of the whip and whether it results in unnecessary harm to the animal. Racing Australia has since amended its rules governing the use of the whip, effective from 1 December 2015.

== Race summary ==
Prince of Penzance, ridden by jockey Michelle Payne, won the race. He was trained by Darren Weir, who has since been banned from horseracing & charged with animal cruelty offences.

Max Dynamite ran second and Criterion third.

Prince of Penzance pulled ahead of the front-runners only around 100m from the finish of the race, surprising many, including Payne. Payne's technique focused on galloping, due to her belief that doing so was key to winning.

== Field ==
No.	Horse		Trainer(s)		Jockey		Weight	Barrier	Place
1	(United Kingdom)	Snow Sky	(United Kingdom)	Sir Michael Stoute	(United Kingdom)	Ryan Moore	58 kg	16	23rd
2	(New Zealand)	Criterion	(Australia) (Australia)	David Hayes; Tom Dabernig	(New Zealand)	Michael Walker	57.5 kg	4	3rd
3	(Japan)	Fame Game†	(Japan)	Yoshitada Munakata	(Australia)	Zac Purton	57 kg	12	13th
4	(Germany)	Our Ivanhowe	(Australia)	Lee Freedman; Anthony Freedman	(Australia)	Ben Melham	56 kg	22	10th
5	(United Kingdom)	Big Orange	(United Kingdom)	Michael Bell	(Republic of Ireland)	Jamie Spencer	55.5 kg	23	5th
6	(United Kingdom)	Hartnell	(Australia)	John O'Shea	(New Zealand)	James McDonald	55.5 kg	17	15th
7	(Japan)	Hokko Brave	(Japan)	Yasutoshi Matsunaga	(Australia)	Craig Williams	55.5 kg	20	17th
8	(France)	Max Dynamite	(Republic of Ireland)	Willie Mullins	(Italy)	Frankie Dettori	55 kg	2	2nd
9	(United Kingdom)	Red Cadeaux	(United Kingdom)	Ed Dunlop	(France)	Gérald Mossé	55 kg	8	DNF
10	(Republic of Ireland)	Trip To Paris	(United Kingdom)	Ed Dunlop	(Australia)	Tommy Berry	55 kg	14	4th
11	(New Zealand)	Who Shot Thebarman	(New Zealand)	Chris Waller	(Australia)	Blake Shinn	54.5 kg	6	11th
12	(United Kingdom)	Sky Hunter	(United Arab Emirates)	Saeed bin Suroor	(United Kingdom)	William Buick	54 kg	7	22nd
13	(Republic of Ireland)	The Offer	(Australia)	Gai Waterhouse	(Australia)	Damien Oliver	54 kg	13	8th
14	(United Kingdom)	Grand Marshall	(New Zealand)	Chris Waller	(New Zealand)	Jim Cassidy	53.5 kg	15	21st
15	(New Zealand)	Preferment	(New Zealand)	Chris Waller	(Australia)	Hugh Bowman	53.5 kg	11	20th
16	(Republic of Ireland)	Quest For More	(United Kingdom)	Roger Charlton	(Australia)	Damian Lane	53.5 kg	21	9th
17	(United States)	Almoonquith	(Australia) (Australia)	David Hayes; Tom Dabernig	(Australia)	Dwayne Dunn	53 kg	10	18th
18	(Republic of Ireland)	Kingfisher	(Republic of Ireland)	Aidan O'Brien	(Republic of Ireland)	Colm O'Donoghue	53 kg	9	19th
19	(New Zealand)	Prince of Penzance	(Australia)	Darren Weir	(Australia)	Michelle Payne	53 kg	1	1st
20	(Republic of Ireland)	Bondi Beach	(Republic of Ireland)	Aidan O'Brien	(Australia)	Brett Prebble	52.5 kg	18	16th
21	(Australia)	Sertorius	(Australia)	Jamie Edwards	(Australia)	Craig Newitt	52.5 kg	5	12th
22	(Republic of Ireland)	The United States	(Australia)	Robert Hickmott	(Brazil)	João Moreira	52.5 kg	3	14th
23	(United Kingdom)	Excess Knowledge	(Australia)	Gai Waterhouse	(Australia)	Kerrin McEvoy	51 kg	24	7th
24	(New Zealand)	Gust Of Wind	(New Zealand)	John Sargent	(Australia)	Chad Schofield	51 kg	19	6th

† Indicates race favourite

== Fatalities ==
Three-time cup runner-up Red Cadeaux did not finish, suffering a suspected fracture in the left fetlock, a joint above the hoof similar to an ankle in humans. The gelding was taken to a veterinary clinic for surgery. Red Cadeaux's trainer initially announced that the horse would likely recover, but retired from racing. However, on 21 November, Red Cadeaux was euthanised, due to complications from the injury.

== See also ==
- List of Melbourne Cup winners
- List of Melbourne Cup placings
