= 2026 Melbourne Cup =

Australian thoroughbred horse race

- Melbourne Cup
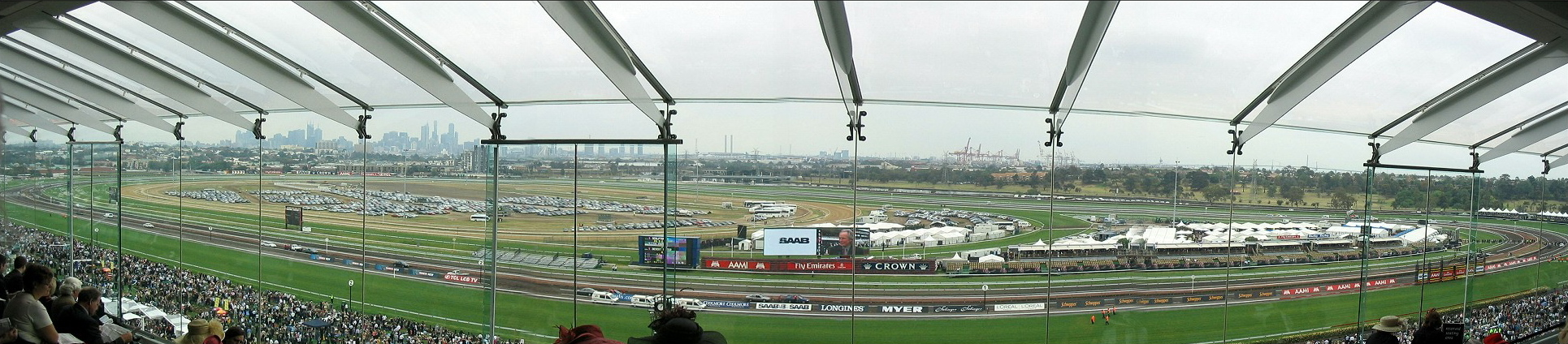
- Flemington Racecourse, location of the race
- Location: Flemington Racecourse; Melbourne, Australia
- Date: 3 November 2026
- Distance: 3,200 metres
- Winning horse: Point Of Law
- Starting price: $7
- Jockey: Ethan Brown
- Trainer: Ciaron Maher
- Surface: Grass
- Attendance: 97,112

Royal Supremacy, it's a long straight, starting to get tired at the 250. Juja Kibo's coming and Point of Law over on the far side. Royal Supremacy stopping, Point of Law's got it, 100 meters to go. Point of Law comes away for Ethan Brown at start six, a magnificent performance has won the Melbourne Cup! Point of Law has won it.

— Commentator Matt Hill describes the climax of the race

The 2026 Melbourne Cup, known commercially as the 2026 Lexus Melbourne Cup, was the 166th running of the Melbourne Cup, an Australian thoroughbred horse race. The race, ran over 3,200 metres (1.988 mi), was held on 3 November 2026 at Melbourne's Flemington Racecourse.

The final field for the race was declared on 31 October 2026. The total prize money for the race will be A$10.2 million, a $200,000 increase from 2025.

The race was won by Point Of Law, ridden by Ethan Brown.

== Field ==
Number	Horse	Age/Sex	Breeding	Trainer	Jockey	Weight (kg)	Barrier	Placing
1	Sons And Lovers (GB)	5g	Study of Man (IRE)-So In Love (GB) (by Smart Strike)	Joseph O’Brien	Dylan Browne McMonagle	57.5	3	4th
2	Trustyourinstinct (IRE)	6g	Churchill (IRE)-Gussy Goose (IRE) (by Danehill Dancer)	Joseph O’Brien	James McDonald	57	18	11th
3	Knight's Choice	7g	Extreme Choice (Aus)-Midnight Pearl (Aus) (by More Than Ready)	John Symons & Sheila Laxon	Robbie Dolan	56.5	2	12th
4	Middle Earth (GB)	6g	Roaring Lion (USA)-Roheryn (IRE) (by Galileo)	Ciaron Maher	Mark Zahra	56.5	1	10th
5	Vauban (FR)	8g	Galiway (GB)-Waldfest (GB) (by Hurricane Run)	Gai Waterhouse & Adrian Bott	Jordan Childs	56.5	22	23rd
6	Enfjaar (IRE)	6g	Lope De Vega (IRE)-Tesoro (IRE) (by Galileo)	Roger Varian	Ray Dawson	56	8	15th
7	Royal Supremacy (IRE)	5g	Make Believe (GB)-Adelasia (IRE) (by Iffraaj)	Ciaron Maher	Ben Allen	56	21	5th
8	Wine Dark Sea	4g	Ulysses (IRE)-Ajwibah (GB) (by Sea the Stars)	Harry Charlton	Damian Lane	56	23	19th
9	Asterix (NZ)	8g	Tavistock (NZ)-Mourasana (GB) (by Shirocco)	Chris Waller	Jye McNeil	55	6	Scratched
10	Goodie Two Shoes (IRE)	7m	Fastnet Rock (AUS)-Fits Like A Glove (IRE) (by Galileo)	Joseph O’Brien	Wayne Lordan	55	19	22nd
11	Juja Kibo (IRE)	5g	Belardo (IRE)-Na Zdorovie (GB) (by Cockney Rebel)	Ciaron Maher	Sam Clipperton	55	14	3rd
12	Hopewell Rock (IRE)	4g	New Bay (GB)-Tidewalker (IRE) (by Lawman)	George Boughey	Zac Lloyd	54.5	15	9th
13	Onesmoothoperator (USA)	8g	Dialed In (USA)-Sueno D'oro (USA) (by Medaglia D'oro)	Tim Fitzsimmons	Declan Bates	54.5	13	21st
14	Soul Of Spain (IRE)	5g	Phoenix of Spain (IRE)-Aimhirgin Lass (IRE) (by Pivotal)	Chris Waller	Tommy Berry	54.5	5	13th
15	Zahrann (IRE)	4s	Night Of Thunder (IRE)-Zannda (IRE) (by Azamour)	Ciaron Maher	Ben Melham	54.5	11	2nd
16	So You Are	5g	So You Think (NZ)-Tornado Gal (AUS) (by Hard Spun)	Bjorn Baker	Rachel King	54	7	8th
17	Future History (GB)	8g	Showcasing (GB)-Likelihood (USA) (by Mizzen Mast)	Gregory Hickman	Jamie Melham	53.5	12	20th
18	James J Braddock (IRE)	3g	Zarak (FR)-Burkina Faso (GB) (by Mukhadram)	Joseph O’Brien	Craig Williams	53.5	24	7th
19	Kizlyar (IRE)	4g	Make Believe (GB)-Kisanga (IRE) (by Redoute's Choice)	Joseph O’Brien	Beau Mertens	53.5	20	16th
20	Point Of Law (GB)	3c	Frankel (GB)-Portfolio (JPN) (by Deep Impact)	Ciaron Maher	Ethan Brown	53	9	1st
21	Strictly Business	4m	Grunt (NZ)-Tivoli Lass (AUS) (by Uncle Mo)	Thomas Carberry	Dean Yendall	53	4	18th
22	Mr Monaco (GB)	5g	Territories (IRE)-Alle Stelle (GB) (by Sea the Stars)	Ciaron Maher	Jabez Johnstone	52.5	16	17th
23	Zakouma	6g	Crowded House (GB)-Dar Es Salaam (NZ) (by Zabeel)	Grahame Begg	William Pike	52	10	14th
24	Shockletz (NZ)	5m	Shocking (AUS)-Zelt (AUS) (by Red Ransom)	Ciaron Maher	Harry Coffey	51	17	6th

Another horse, Stinger Glass (JPN), was scheduled to run in the race, but was scratched from the race following a mandatory pre-race scan by veterinarians determining him to be at high risk of injury.

== Previous Melbourne Cup involvement ==
=== Horses ===
- Future History was 15th in 2023
- Goodie Two Shoes was 2nd in 2025
- Knight's Choice was the winner in 2024
- Middle Earth was 3rd in 2025
- Onesmoothoperator was 16th in 2025 and 12th in 2024
- Royal Supremacy was 15th in 2025
- Vauban was 6th in 2025, 11th in 2024 and 14th in 2023.

=== Wins and placings by jockeys ===
- Ethan Brown was 3rd in 2025 (Middle Earth}
- Beau Mertens was 3rd in 2023
- Ben Melham was 2nd in 2017
- Craig Williams was 1st in 2019 (Vow and Declare), 3rd in 2013 and 2021
- James McDonald was 1st in 2021 (Verry Elleegant), 2nd in 2012 and 3rd in 2016
- Jamie Melham was 1st in 2025 (Half Yours) and 3rd in 2020 and 2024
- Jye McNeil was 1st in 2020 (Twilight Payment)
- Mark Zahra was 1st in 2022 (Gold Trip) and 2023 (Without a Fight)
- Robbie Dolan was 1st in 2024 (Knight's Choice)
- Wayne Lordan was 2nd in 2025 (Goodie Two Shoes) and 3rd in 2019.

=== Wins by trainers ===
- Chris Waller won in 2021 (Verry Elleegant)
- Ciaron Maher won in 2022 (Gold Trip)
- Gai Waterhouse won in 2013 (Fiorente)
- Joseph O'Brien won in 2017 (Rekindling) and 2020 (Twilight Payment)
- John Symons and Sheila Laxon won in 2024 (Knight's Choice) and Sheila Laxon won in 2001 (Ethereal).

== Prizemoney ==
The A$10,200,000 prize pool is distributed as follows:

- First: $4,500,000 and trophies valued at $1,110,000 (Note: $1,020,000 (owner); $34,500 (rider – including the Harry White Whip); $25,500 (trainer); $15,000 (strapper – the Tommy Woodcock Trophy) & $15,000 (breeder))
- Second: $1,110,000
- Third: $560,000
- Fourth: $360,000
- Fifth: $240,000
- Sixth to Twelfth: $160,000
- Thirteenth to Twenty Fourth: $100,000 (Note: Subject to conditions set out by the VRC.)

== See also ==
- Maribyrnong Plate
- Maybe Mahal Stakes (The Hong Kong Jockey Club Stakes)
- List of Melbourne Cup winners
- List of Melbourne Cup placings
- Adelaide Cup
- Brisbane Cup
- Caulfield Cup
- Sydney Cup
- List of Australian Group races
- Melbourne Spring Racing Carnival
