= 2024 Melbourne Cup =

Australian thoroughbred horse race

- Melbourne Cup
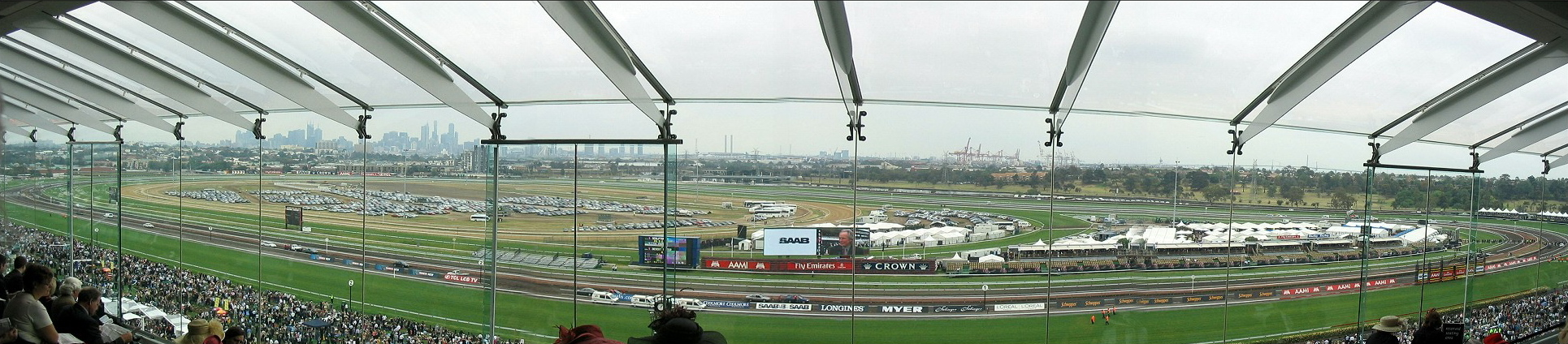
- Flemington Racecourse, location of the race
- Location: Flemington Racecourse; Melbourne, Australia
- Date: 5 November 2024
- Distance: 3,200 metres
- Winning horse: Knight's Choice
- Starting price: $81
- Jockey: Robbie Dolan
- Trainer: John Symons & Sheila Laxon
- Surface: Grass
- Attendance: 91,168

Land Legend goes to the front with Okita Sushi on the outside, then Zardozi, back behind those Circle of Fire, Fancy Man and from a long way back Buckaroo. It's Okita Sushi, Zardozi a length away on the inside wearing it down. Okita Sushi grabbed by Zardozi, Knight's Choice is coming through at any old price and Warp Speed as well. Zardozi grabbed by Knight's Choice and Warp Speed coming at it. Knight's Choice, Warp Speed they hit the line, it's a photo finish! Knight's Choice I reckon's won from Warp Speed in a photo, what a magnificent finish to the Cup!

— Commentator Matt Hill describes the climax of the race

The 2024 Melbourne Cup, known commercially as the 2024 Lexus Melbourne Cup, was the 164th running of the Melbourne Cup, an Australian thoroughbred horse race. The race, run over 3,200 metres (1.988 mi), was held on 5 November 2024 at Melbourne's Flemington Racecourse.

The final field for the race was declared on 2 November 2024. The total prize money for the race was A$8.56 million, a $150,000 increase from 2023. It was the first Melbourne Cup to be broadcast by Nine Network after Network 10, who had broadcast the race since 2019, dropped out of the bidding for the rights to the race in June 2023. Nine Network will have broadcast rights from 2024 until 2029.

The Italian jockey Frankie Dettori decided to not retire from horse racing in order to compete in the 2024 Cup. He was ruled out of the 2023 Cup after being suspended for a whip breach.

The race was won by Knight's Choice, ridden by Robbie Dolan. This was his first time racing in the Cup. Knight’s Choice was co-trained by Sheila Laxon who trained the 2001 Melbourne Cup winner Ethereal. She was also involved with 1988 winner Empire Rose, who was trained by Laurie Laxon.

== Field ==
Number	Horse	Trainer	Jockey	Weight (kg)	Barrier	Placing
1	Vauban (FR)	Willie Mullins	William Buick	55.5	11	11th
2	Buckaroo (GB)	Chris Waller	Joao Moreira	54.5	21	9th
3	Circle Of Fire (GB)	Ciaron Maher	Mark Zahra	54.5	24	6th
4	Warp Speed (JPN)	Noboru Takagi	Akira Sugawara	54.5	3	2nd
5	Kovalica (NZ)	Chris Waller	Damian Lane	53.5	17	10th
6	Sharp 'N' Smart (NZ)	Graeme & Deborah Rogerson	Michael Dee	53.5	15	16th
7	Just Fine (IRE)	Gai Waterhouse & Adrian Bott	Jye McNeil	53	13	23rd
8	Land Legend (FR)	Chris Waller	Zac Purton	53	18	8th
9	Absurde (FR)	Willie Mullins	Kerrin McEvoy	52.5	7	5th
10	Athabascan (FR)	John O’Shea & Tom Charlton	Zac Lloyd	52	2nd	Scratched
11	Knight's Choice	John Symons & Sheila Laxon	Robbie Dolan	51.5	6	1st
12	Okita Soushi (IRE)	Ciaron Maher	Jamie Kah	51	10	3rd
13	Onesmoothoperator (USA)	Brian Ellison	Craig Williams	51	12	12th
14	Zardozi	James Cummings	Andrea Atzeni	51	4	4th
15	Sea King (GB)	Harry Eustace	Hollie Doyle	50.5	1	14th
16	Valiant King (GB)	Chris Waller	Craig Newitt	50.5	22	13th
17	Fancy Man (IRE)	Annabel Neasham & Rob Archibald	Ron Stewart	50	19	7th
18	Interpretation (IRE)	Ciaron Maher	Teo Nugent	50	14	15th
19	Manzoice	Chris Waller	Declan Bates	50	8	19th
20	Mostly Cloudy (IRE)	Trent Busuttin & Natalie Young	Karis Teetan	50	16	18th
21	Positivity (NZ)	Andrew Forsman	Winona Costin	50	20	20th
22	Saint George (GB)	Ciaron Maher	Tyler Schiller	50	9	22nd
23	The Map	Dan Clarken & Oopy MacGillivray	Rachel King	50	23	21st
24	Trust In You (NZ)	Bruce Wallace & Grant Cooksley	Mark Du Plessis	50	5	17th

== Prizemoney ==
The A$7,750,000 prize pool is distributed as follows:

- First: $4,400,000 and trophies valued at $810,000 (Note: $750,000 (owner); $25,000 (rider – including the Harry White Whip); $15,000 (trainer); $10,000 (strapper – the Tommy Woodcock Trophy); & $10,000 (breeder))
- Second: $1,100,000
- Third: $550,000
- Fourth: $350,000
- Fifth: $230,000
- Sixth to Twelfth: $160,000
