= 2023 Melbourne Cup =

Australian thoroughbred horse race

- Melbourne Cup
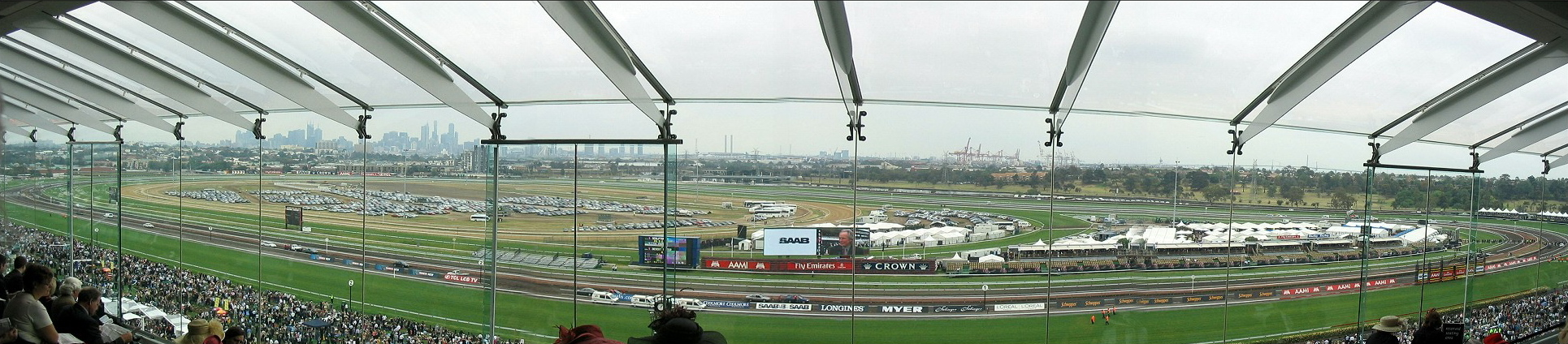
- Flemington Racecourse, location of the race
- Location: Flemington Racecourse; Melbourne, Australia
- Date: 7 November 2023
- Distance: 3,200 metres
- Winning horse: Without A Fight
- Starting price: $9.00
- Jockey: Mark Zahra
- Trainer: Anthony & Sam Freedman
- Surface: Grass
- Attendance: 84,492

400 meters to go, it's Absurde moving up on the outside for Zac Purton a length in front but Without A Fight is running on right down the centre of the track. Without A Fight up to Absurde, Vow And Declare and Sheraz the bolter. It's Without A Fight, a hundred meters to go, 2 or 3 lengths in front, coming away from Sheraz and also Soulcome. Without A Fight, Mark Zahra, a Melbourne Cup champion, wins it by two lengths!

— Commentator Matt Hill describes the climax of the race

The 2023 Melbourne Cup, known commercially as the 2023 Lexus Melbourne Cup, was the 163rd running of the Melbourne Cup, an Australian thoroughbred horse race. The race, run over 3,200 metres (1.988 mi), was held on 7 November 2023 at Melbourne's Flemington Racecourse.

The final field for the race was declared on 4 November 2023. The total prize money for the race was A$8.41 million, a $410,000 increase from 2022. It was the last Melbourne Cup broadcast by Network 10, who have broadcast the race since 2019 and dropped out of the bidding for the broadcast rights in June 2023. In February 2024, Nine Entertainment, owner of Nine Network, announced they will broadcast the race from 2024 until 2029.

The race was won by Without A Fight, ridden by Mark Zahra. It was Zahra's second Melbourne Cup win, having ridden Gold Trip to victory in the 2022 Melbourne Cup.

The top-weighted horse was the 17th placed Gold Trip carrying 58kg, then Alenquer (21st), and the winner Without A Fight on 56.5kg.

== Field ==
Number	Horse	Trainer	Jockey	Weight (kg)	Barrier	Placing
1	Gold Trip (FR)	Ciaron Maher & David Eustace	James McDonald	58	2	17th
2	Alenquer (FR)	Michael Moroney	Damien Oliver	56.5	9	21st
3	Without A Fight (IRE)	Anthony Freedman & Sam Freedman	Mark Zahra	56.5	10	1st
4	Breakup (JPN)	Tatsuya Yoshioka	Kohei Matsuyama	55	18	16th
5	Vauban (FR)	Willie Mullins	Ryan Moore	55	3	14th
6	Soulcome (GB)	Chris Waller	João Moreira	53.5	4	2nd
7	Absurde (FR)	Willie Mullins	Zac Purton	53	8	7th
8	Right You Are	Ciaron Maher & David Eustace	John Allen	53	15	FF
9	Vow And Declare	Danny O'Brien	Billy Egan	53	19	9th
10	Cleveland (IRE)	Kris Lees	Michael Dee	52	23	Scratched
11	Ashrun (FR)	Ciaron Maher & David Eustace	Kerrin McEvoy	51.5	11	4th
12	Daqiansweet Junior (NZ)	Phillip Stokes	Daniel Stackhouse	51.5	12	5th
13	Okita Soushu (IRE)	Joseph O'Brien	Dylan Gibbons	51.5	20	11th
14	Sheraz (FR)	Chris Waller	Beau Mertens	51.5	22	3rd
15	Lastotchka (FR)	Mick Price & Michael Kent Jnr	Craig Williams	51	21	13th
16	Magical Lagoon (IRE)	Chris Waller	Mark Du Plessis	51	7	22nd
17	Military Mission (IRE)	Gai Waterhouse & Adrian Bott	Rachel King	51	5	10th
18	Serpentine (IRE)	Gai Waterhouse & Adrian Bott	Jye McNeil	51	1	19th
19	Virtous Circle (NZ)	Liam Howley	Craig Newitt	51	6	18th
20	More Fellons (IRE)	Chris Waller	Jamie Kah	50.5	24	12th
21	Future History (GB)	Ciaron Maher & David Eustace	Hollie Doyle	50	13	15th
22	Interpretation (IRE)	Ciaron Maher & David Eustace	Teo Nugent	50	17	6th
23	Kalapour (IRE)	Kris Lees	Zac Lloyd	50	14	20th
24	True Marvel (FR)	Matthew Smith	Ben Thompson	50	10	8th
