= 2020 Melbourne Cup =

2020 Lexus Melbourne Cup

- Melbourne Cup
- Location: Flemington Racecourse; Melbourne, Australia
- Date: 3 November 2020
- Distance: 3,200 metres
- Winning horse: Twilight Payment
- Starting price: $26
- Jockey: Jye McNeil
- Trainer: Joseph O’Brien
- Owner: Lloyd Williams
- Surface: Grass
- Attendance: N/A (no attendance due to COVID-19 pandemic restrictions)

Twilight Payment at the 300 meters, still three lengths Finche, Tiger Moth, The Chosen One running on with Russian Camelot and Persan. Twilight Payment tries to break their hearts, Tiger Moth wearing him down with The Chosen One. It's Twilight Payment, Tiger Moth still trying to get there. Twilight Payment, what a ride, what a win in a Cup we'll never forget! Has won it from Tiger Moth and Prince of Arran

— Commentator Matt Hill describes the climax of the race

The 2020 Melbourne Cup (known commercially as the 2020 Lexus Melbourne Cup) was the 160th running of the Melbourne Cup, a prestigious Australian Thoroughbred horse race. The race, run over 3,200 metres (1.988 mi), was held on 3 November 2020 at Melbourne's Flemington Racecourse.

The final field for the race was declared on 31 October. The total prize money for the race was A$8 million, the same as the previous year.

Due to the COVID-19 pandemic, the public and horse owners were not able to attend the event.

The race was won by Twilight Payment, ridden by Jye McNeil and trained by Joseph O'Brien.

== Field ==
Number	Horse	Trainer	Jockey	Weight (kg)	Barrier	Placing
1	Anthony Van Dyck	Aidan O'Brien	Hugh Bowman	58.5	3	FF
2	Avilius	James Cummings	John Allen	57	10	22nd
3	Vow And Declare	Danny O'Brien	Jamie Mott	57	4	18th
4	Master of Reality	Joseph O'Brien	Ben Melham	56	11	15th
5	Sir Dragonet	Ciaron Maher & David Eustace	Glen Boss	55.5	14	6th
6	Twilight Payment	Joseph O'Brien	Jye McNeil	55.5	12	1st
7	Verry Elleegant	Chris Waller	Mark Zahra	55.5	15	7th
8	Mustajeer	Kris Lees	Michael Rodd	55	2	19th
9	Stratum Albion (Note: Originally named Stratum while training in Europe.)	Willie Mullins	Jordan Childs	55	9	20th
10	Dashing Willoughby	Andrew Balding	Michael Walker	54.5	19	21st
11	Finche	Chris Waller	James McDonald	54.5	6	9th
12	Prince of Arran (Note: Also known as A Prince of Arran in 2018 Melbourne Cup)	Charlie Fellowes	Jamie Kah	54.5	1	3rd
13	Surprise Baby	Paul Preusker	Craig Williams	54.5	7	13th
14	King of Leogrance	Danny O’Brien	Damian Lane	53.5	18	Scratched
15	Russian Camelot	Danny O'Brien	Damien Oliver	53.5	16	8th
16	Steel Prince	Anthony & Sam Freedman	William Pike	53.5	21	16th
17	The Chosen One	Murray Baker & Andrew Forsman	Daniel Stackhouse	53.5	5	4th
18	Ashrun	Andreas Wohler	Declan Bates	53	24	10th
19	Warning	Anthony & Sam Freedman	Luke Currie	53	8	12th
20	Etah James	Ciaron Maher & David Eustace	Billy Egan	52.5	22	17th
21	Tiger Moth	Aidan O'Brien	Kerrin McEvoy	52.5	23	2nd
22	Oceanex	Mick Price & Michael Kent	Dean Yendall	51.5	17	11th
23	Miami Bound	Danny O'Brien	Daniel Moor	51	13	14th
24	Persan	Ciaron Maher & David Eustace	Michael Dee	51	20	5th

== Fatalities ==
Anthony Van Dyck was euthanised after suffering a fractured fetlock, becoming the second horse that had to be euthanized at Flemington in 2020, and the sixth horse to die during the Melbourne Cup since 2013.
