= Knight's Choice =

Thoroughbred racehorse

- Sire: Extreme Choice
- Grandsire: Not A Single Doubt
- Dam: Midnight Pearl
- Damsire: More Than Ready
- Sex: Gelding
- Foaled: 20 September 2019
- Country: Australia
- Colour: Bay
- Breeder: Norm and Di Bazeley
- Owner: Cameron A Bain, Mrs K J Waldron & R A Waldron
- Trainer: John Symons & Sheila Laxon
- Record: 23 6-3-2
- Earnings: $5,842,400

Major wins
- Melbourne Cup (2024)

Awards
- Australian Champion Stayer (2024/2025)
- Last updated on 5 November 2024

Knight's Choice (foaled 20 September 2019) is a Thoroughbred racehorse. Bred by Norm and Di Bazeley at Elswick Park, a stud in Walcha, northern New South Wales, he was the winner of the 2024 Melbourne Cup, ridden by Robbie Dolan and trained by John Symons and Sheila Laxon.

== Background ==
Norm Bazeley who had formerly worked as a track rider and later a construction manager was a farmer and horse breeder. He was notable for breeding Top Knight (by Zoustar) who won the 2020 Singapore Derby and Queen Elizabeth Cup (Listed, 1800m). Bazeley bred Knight's Choice from the mare Midnight Pearl which he bought for $1,000 in an online sale in 2013. Midnight Pearl had won seven races in Victoria country for Sheila Laxon the trainer of the 2001 Melbourne Cup winner Ethereal. It was Laxon's connection to Midnight Pearl that led to her and Symons purchasing the horse on behalf of clients.

It was reported in July 2023 that the owners had declined an offer of more than $2.3m for Knight's Choice.

== Racing career ==
Knight Choice's career included:

- 26/05/2023 - 1st in a 3YO maiden over 1600m at Sunshine Coast (ridden by Micheal Hellyer)
- 11/06/23 - 1st in a Benchmark 65 over 1600m at Sunshine Coast (Michael Hellyer)
- 21/06/23 - 1st in Benchmark 65 over 1650m at Doomben (Jaden Lloyd)
- 1/07/23 - 1st in the Winx Guineas (Group 3, 1600m) at Sunshine Coast (Jaden Lloyd)
- 21/10/23 - 5th in the Filante Handicap (1600m) at Randwick (Zac Lloyd)
- 13/11/23 - 13th in the Golden Eagle over 1500m at Rosehill (Jaden Lloyd)
- 2/12/23 - 1st in the Vale Wayne Purchase Open Handicap over 2000m at Doomben (Jaden Lloyd)
- 18/05/24 - 2nd in the Sky Racing Members Handicap over 1600m at Doomben (Craig Williams). The winner was Gringotts with Nikau Spur 3rd.
- 1/06/24 - 4th in the Lord Mayor’s Cup (Group 3, 1800m) at Eagle Farm (Vlad Duric)
- 15/06/24 - 2nd in the HKJC World Pool (Group 2, 2200m) at Eagle Farm (Robbie Dolen). The winner was Fawkner Park with Bois D'argent 3rd.
- 29/06/24 - 3rd in the Tattersall's Cup (Group 3, 2400m) at Eagle Farm (Robbie Dolan). The winner was Vow and Declare with Young Werther 2nd.
- 14/07/24 - 4th in the Coloundra Cup (listed 2400m) at Sunshine Coast (Robbie Dolan)
- 21/09/24 - 9th in the Underwood Stakes (Craig Williams)
- 5/10/24 - 16th in the Turnbull Stakes (Jordan Childs)
- 19/10/24 - 14th in the Caulfield Cup (Robbie Dolan)
- 30/10/24 - 5th in the Bendigo Cup (Group 3, 2400m) at Bendigo (Robbie Dolan)
- 5/11/24 - 1st in the 2024 Melbourne Cup at Flemington (Robbie Dolan). Warp Speed was 2nd and Okita Soushi 3rd.

== See also ==
- List of Melbourne Cup winners
