= Scott Seamer (jockey) =

Australian jockey

Scott Seamer is an Australian jockey who is notable for having won the Caulfield Cup and Melbourne Cup on Ethereal in 2001.

== Racing career ==
Seamer started his racing career as a stable hand for Coffs Harbour trainer, John Hennessy, and later started his apprenticeship with Ron Gosling at Glen Innes.

He originally rode in Bush races before moving to Brisbane. His manager, Trevor Lansky, persuaded the connections of Ethereal to give Seamer the ride in the Queensland Oaks.

Seamer had an affinity with New Zealand racing, not just through riding for Sheila Laxon but also due to his many visits across the Tasman where he rode successfully and claimed a number of Group races.

After winning 22 Group 1 races, Seamer retired from riding on New Year's Eve on 2011 when he had a fall and was concussed at Doomben.

He operated a macadamia farm on his property at Fernleigh in Northern New South Wales and later a commercial breeding enterprise.

== Major wins ==
- 2000 Champagne Classic (BRC) on Chenar for Robert Heathcote
- 2001 Queensland Oaks on Ethereal for Sheila Laxon
- 2001 Caulfield Cup on Ethereal for Sheila Laxon
- 2001 Mackinnon Stakes on La Bella Dama for Graeme Rogerson
- 2001 Melbourne Cup on Ethereal for Sheila Laxon
- 2001 New Zealand Derby on Leica Guv for Jeff McVean
- 2002 Auckland Cup on Maguire for Ken Collins
- 2002 New Zealand Oaks on Vapour Trail for Donna and Dean Logan
- 2002 Golden Slipper Stakes on Calaway Girl for Bruce Brown
- 2002 The BMW on Ethereal for Sheila Laxon
- 2003 Australian Derby on Clangalang for Gerald Ryan
- 2003 Queensland Derby on Half Hennessy for Bede Murray
- 2004 Epsom Handicap on Desert War for Gai Waterhouse
- 2004 Champagne Classic (BRC) on Golden Fox for Trevor Whittingdon
- 2005 Queensland Guineas on Saxon for Gerald Ryan
- 2008 Queensland Oaks on Riva San for Peter Moody
- 2009 New Zealand Derby on Coniston Bluebird for Bede Murray
