= Peter Vela =

New Zealand racehorse breeder

Sir Peter Vela KNZM
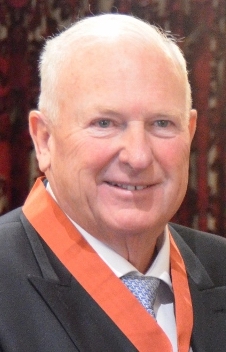
- Vela in 2014
- Born: Peter James Vela; 1948 or 1949 (age 75–76)
- Occupation(s): Thoroughbred racehorse breeder and owner

Sir Peter James Vela KNZM (born 1948 or 1949) is a New Zealand businessman and Thoroughbred breeder and owner. With his brother Philip he founded Vela Fishing and Pencarrow Stud. He is most notably associated with the mare Ethereal, winner of the 2001 Melbourne Cup.

== Biography ==
Vela was born in about 1949, the son of Filip Vela, who had come to New Zealand from the Croatian village of Pogdora in the 1920s. With his brother, Philip, Peter Vela founded a commercial fishing company in the 1970s. Vela Fishing grew to become one of the largest privately owned fishing companies in New Zealand. The company was the first to export New Zealand fillet products to the United Kingdom, and the first to export sea-frozen hoki fillets to the United States.

Philip and Peter Vela went on to establish Pencarrow Stud, on a 300-hectare (741-acre) property at Tamahere on the outskirts of Hamilton. They owned and bred a number of successful horses, including Ethereal, which won both the Melbourne Cup and Caulfield Cup in 2001. Among the horses bred by Pencarrow and sold as yearlings was Darci Brahma, which went on to win five group 1 races. In 2000 and 2002, the Velas received the New Zealand Breeder of the Year award.

In 1997, the Velas purchased the Karaka-based Wrightson Bloodstock Ltd, renaming it New Zealand Bloodstock, and developing the New Zealand Bloodstock Yearling Sales and the Karaka Million horse races.

The brothers split their business interests in 2013, with Philip taking control of Vela Fishing, while Peter retained ownership of the bloodstock enterprises. Philip Vela died in 2015. The Vela family wealth was estimated at NZ$245million in the 2019 NBR Rich List.

In the 2002 Queen's Birthday and Golden Jubilee Honours, Peter Vela was appointed an Officer of the New Zealand Order of Merit, for services to horse racing and the bloodstock industry. In the 2014 New Year Honours, he was promoted to Knight Companion of the same order, for services to the Thoroughbred industry.

Vela was inducted into the New Zealand Racing Hall of Fame in May 2021.
