= It's in the Air =

It's in the Air may refer to:

- It's in the Air (1938 film), a British comedy film
- It's in the Air (1935 film), an American comedy film
- It's in the Air (horse), an American Thoroughbred racehorse
