= 2022 Melbourne Cup =

2022 Lexus Melbourne Cup

- Melbourne Cup
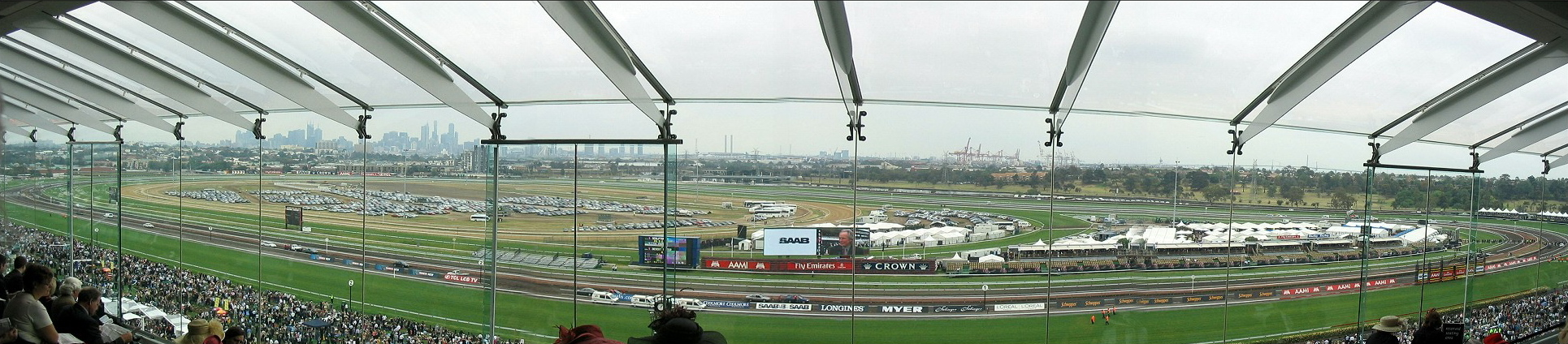
- Flemington Racecourse, location of the race.
- Location: Flemington Racecourse; Melbourne, Australia
- Date: 1 November 2022
- Distance: 3,200 metres
- Winning horse: Gold Trip
- Starting price: $21
- Jockey: Mark Zahra
- Trainer: Ciaron Maher & David Eustace
- Surface: Grass
- Attendance: 73,816

Gold Trip moves up takes the lead from Deauville Legend, 250 metres to go, Emissary running on. Gold Trip a hundred and fifty metres to go wandering about getting tired Emissary is trying very very hard. But Gold Trip is brave, a hundred to go, a length and a half Emissary. Gold Trip is going to win the Lexus Melbourne Cup! Gold Trip wins it in a real staying contest for the ages, two lengths Emissary, late third High Emocean.

— Commentator Matt Hill describes the climax of the race

The 2022 Melbourne Cup (known commercially as the 2022 Lexus Melbourne Cup) was the 162nd running of the Melbourne Cup, a prestigious Australian Thoroughbred horse race. The race, run over 3,200 metres (1.988 mi), was held on 1 November 2022 at Melbourne's Flemington Racecourse.

The final field for the race was declared on 29 October 2022. The total prize money for the race was A$8 million, the same as the previous year.

The race was won by Gold Trip, ridden by Mark Zahra and trained by Ciaron Maher & David Eustace.

At least three Melbourne Cup runners were ruled out of the races during failed CT scan, including Caulfield Cup winner Durston.

== Field ==
Number	Horse	Trainer	Jockey	Weight (kg)	Barrier	Placing
1	Gold Trip (FR)	Ciaron Maher & David Eustace	Mark Zahra	57.5	14	1st
2	Duais	Edward Cummings	Hugh Bowman	55.5	10	18th
3	Knights Order (IRE)	Gai Waterhouse & Adrian Bott	Tim Clark	55.5	24	9th
4	Montefilia	David Payne	Jason Collett	55.5	11	16th
5	Numerian (IRE)	Annabel Neasham	Tommy Berry	55.5	7	19th
6	Without A Fight (IRE)	Simon & Ed Crisford	William Buick	55.5	18	13th
7	Camorra (IRE)	Ben & JD Hayes	Ben Melham	55	17	21st
8	Deauville Legend (IRE)	James Ferguson	Kerrin McEvoy	55	9	4th
9	Stockman (NZ)	Joseph Pride	Sam Clipperton	54	2	8th
10	Vow And Declare	Danny O’Brien	Blake Shinn	54	4	10th
11	Young Werther (NZ)	Danny O’Brien	Damian Lane	54	21	15th
12	Hoo Ya Mal (GB)	Gai Waterhouse & Adrian Bott	Craig Williams	53.5	15	12th
13	Serpentine (IRE)	Robert Hickmott	John Allen	53.5	23	20th
14	Daqiansweet Junior (NZ)	Phillip Stokes	Daniel Moor	53	13	6th
15	Grand Promenade (GB)	Ciaron Maher & David Eustace	Harry Coffey	53	1	14th
16	Arapaho (FR)	Bjorn Baker	Rachel King	52.5	19	11th
17	Emissary (GB)	Michael Moroney	Patrick Moloney	51.5	3	2nd
18	Lunar Flare	Grahame Begg	Michael Dee	51.5	12	Scratched
19	Smokin’ Romans (NZ)	Ciaron Maher & David Eustace	Jamie Kah	51.5	16	7th
20	Tralee Rose (NZ)	Symon Wilde	Dean Yendall	51.5	22	17th
21	Point Nepean (IRE)	Robert Hickmott	Wayne Lordan	51	20	Scratched
22	High Emocean (NZ)	Ciaron Maher & David Eustace	Teo Nugent	50	8	3rd
23	Interpretation (IRE)	Ciaron Maher & David Eustace	Craig Newitt	50	6	FF
24	Realm Of Flowers	Anthony & Sam Freedman	Damien Thornton	50	5	5th
