= Media Puzzle =

Horse

- Sire: Theatrical
- Grandsire: Nureyev
- Dam: Market Slide
- Damsire: Gulch
- Sex: Gelding
- Foaled: 1997
- Country: United States
- Colour: Chestnut
- Breeder: Moyglare Stud
- Owner: Dr. Michael W. Smurfit
- Trainer: Dermot K. Weld
- Record: 20: 6–1–6
- Earnings: US$2,592,706 (equivalent)

Major wins
- Ulster Derby (2000); Geelong Cup (2002); Melbourne Cup (2002); Saval Beg Stakes (2006)

Awards
- Australian Champion Stayer (2003)
- Last updated on August 19, 2007

Media Puzzle (May 7, 1997 – June 22, 2006), foaled in the United States was an Irish horse best known for his win in the 2002 Melbourne Cup.

== Background ==
Media Puzzle was bred by Walter Haefner's Moyglare Stud Farm and owned by Dr. M. W. Smurfit. He was sired by Theatrical, the 1987 U.S. Champion Male Turf Horse, and out of the mare Market Slide by Gulch, the 1988 U.S. Champion Sprint Horse. Media Puzzle is the half brother of Refuse to Bend, a four-time group 1 winning entire by Sadler's Wells.

== Racing career ==
At age three, Media Puzzle's best showings were third-place finishes in the Gallinule and St. Leger Stakes.

Plagued by tendon problems throughout his career, after a difficult 2001, Media Puzzle had his best year in 2002. Taken to Australia, his winning time of 2.25.90 in the 2400-metre Geelong Cup broke the course record for the race. He went on to win the 2002 Melbourne Cup with Damien Oliver on board. Oliver's brother Jason had died one week before the Melbourne Cup win in 2002.

== Death ==
Media Puzzle was put down after shattering a leg at the Ascot Gold Cup.

== See also ==
- 2002 Melbourne Cup
- List of Melbourne Cup winners
