= Point Of Law (horse) =

- Sire: Frankel
- Grandsire: Galileo
- Dam: Portfolio
- Damsire: Deep Impact
- Sex: Stallion
- Foaled: 19 March 2023
- Country: Great Britain
- Colour: Bay
- Breeder: King Charles III and Queen Camilla
- Owner: King Charles III and Queen Camilla (before August 2026); Deg Racing et al.
- Trainer: John & Thady Gosden; Ciaron Maher
- Record: 6-4-1-0
- Earnings: AU$6,188,200

Major wins
- Bahrain Trophy (2026); Geelong Cup (2026); Melbourne Cup (2026)
- Last updated on 3 November 2026

Point Of Law (foaled 19 March 2023) is a British-born Thoroughbred stallion racehorse who won the 2026 Melbourne Cup, ridden by Ethan Brown and trained by Ciaron Maher. He was born under King Charles III and Queen Camilla's breeding programme and was later sold to Australian based DEG Racing to race in the Southern Hemisphere.

== Background ==
Point Of Law was foaled into King Charles III's and Queen Camilla's breeding programme and trained by Ciaron Maher. He made his racing debut at Newbury Racecourse with his jockey competing in the King's silks. Point Of Law won his maiden race in the Maiden Stakes. He went on to win the Bahrain Trophy, which made him eligible to enter the St Leger Stakes. However, before the race, The King sold Point Of Law in August 2026 to the Australian backed DEG Racing for him to continue his career in Australia instead and did not compete at St Leger.

After being moved to Australia, Point Of Law won the Geelong Cup. However, due to the win, he was given a weight penalty for the Melbourne Cup due to competing well against older horses because he did not have a long racing record to judge the performance. Despite the handicap, Point of Law won the Melbourne Cup. In doing so, he became the first horse from the Northern Hemisphere to win the race. His jockey, Ethan Brown, said that he believed that Point Of Law would be a "superstar". Under the terms of the sale contract, it is believed that 10% of Point of Law's prize money would be given to The King under a breeder's clause.

== Pedigree ==
Pedigree of Point Of Law (GB), bay stallion, 2023
Sire Frankel (GB) b. 2008	Galileo (IRE) b. 1998	Sadler's Wells (USA) b. 1981	Northern Dancer (CAN)
Sire Frankel (GB) b. 2008	Galileo (IRE) b. 1998	Sadler's Wells (USA) b. 1981	Fairy Bridge (USA)
Sire Frankel (GB) b. 2008	Galileo (IRE) b. 1998	Urban Sea (USA) ch. 1989	Miswaki (USA)
Sire Frankel (GB) b. 2008	Galileo (IRE) b. 1998	Urban Sea (USA) ch. 1989	Allegretta (GB)
Sire Frankel (GB) b. 2008	Kind (IRE) b. 2001	Danehill (USA) b. 1986	Danzig (USA)
Sire Frankel (GB) b. 2008	Kind (IRE) b. 2001	Danehill (USA) b. 1986	Razyana (USA)
Sire Frankel (GB) b. 2008	Kind (IRE) b. 2001	Rainbow Lake (GB) b. 1990	Rainbow Quest (USA)
Sire Frankel (GB) b. 2008	Kind (IRE) b. 2001	Rainbow Lake (GB) b. 1990	Rockfest (USA)
Dam Portfolio (JPN) b. 2018	Deep Impact (JPN) b. 2002	Sunday Silence (USA) dk b. 1986	Halo (USA)
Dam Portfolio (JPN) b. 2018	Deep Impact (JPN) b. 2002	Sunday Silence (USA) dk b. 1986	Wishing Well (USA)
Dam Portfolio (JPN) b. 2018	Deep Impact (JPN) b. 2002	Wind in Her Hair (IRE) b. 1991	Alzao (USA)
Dam Portfolio (JPN) b. 2018	Deep Impact (JPN) b. 2002	Wind in Her Hair (IRE) b. 1991	Burghclere (GB)
Dam Portfolio (JPN) b. 2018	Diploma (GB) b. 2013	Dubawi (IRE) b. 2002	Dubai Millennium (GB)
Dam Portfolio (JPN) b. 2018	Diploma (GB) b. 2013	Dubawi (IRE) b. 2002	Zomaradah (GB)
Dam Portfolio (JPN) b. 2018	Diploma (GB) b. 2013	Enticement (GB) b. 2006	Montjeu (IRE)
Dam Portfolio (JPN) b. 2018	Diploma (GB) b. 2013	Enticement (GB) b. 2006	Ecoutila (Family 4-j)

Note: b. = Bay, ch. = Chestnut, dk b. = Dark Bay

== See also ==
- List of Melbourne Cup winners
