= 2019 Melbourne Cup =

Australian horse race

- Melbourne Cup
- Location: Flemington Racecourse; Melbourne, Australia
- Date: 5 November 2019
- Distance: 3,200 metres
- Winning horse: Vow And Declare
- Starting price: $11
- Jockey: Craig Williams
- Trainer: Danny O’Brien
- Surface: Grass
- Attendance: 81,408

Master of Reality with Vow and Declare on the inside then Prince of Arran, Raymound Tusk, Finche. It's Master of Reality, Vow and Declare up on the inside, Vow and Declare, Prince of Arran is lifting late with Il Paradiso, Master of Reality just in front, Vow and Declare kicks, Vow and Declare's won it, for Australia, they're on top of the world!

— Commentator Matt Hill describes the climax of the race

The 2019 Melbourne Cup (known commercially as 2019 Lexus Melbourne Cup) was the 159th running of the Melbourne Cup, a prestigious Australian Thoroughbred horse race. The race, run over 3,200 metres (1.988 mi), was held on 5 November 2019 at Melbourne's Flemington Racecourse.

The race was overshadowed by recent news of the ill-treatment of horses in the Australian racing industry, and by the pulling out of notable celebrities including pop-star Taylor Swift, model Megan Gale, and X-Men actress Lana Condor.

The final field for the race was declared on 2 November. The total prize money for the race was A$8 million, an increase of the previous year.

The race was won by Vow And Declare, ridden by Craig Williams and trained by Danny O'Brien.

== Field ==
Number	Horse	Trainer	Jockey	Weight (kg)	Barrier	Placing
1	Cross Counter	Charlie Appleby (United Arab Emirates)	William Buick	57.5	5	8th
2	Mer De Glace	Hisashi Shimizu (Japan)	Damian Lane	56	2	6th
3	Master of Reality	Joseph O’Brien (Ireland)	Frankie Dettori	55.5	1	4th
4	Mirage Dancer	Trent Busuttin & Natalie Young	Ben Melham	55.5	13	14th
5	Southern France	Ciaron Maher-David Eustace	Mark Zahra	55.5	14	19th
6	Hunting Horn	Aidan O'Brien (Ireland)	Seamie Heffernan	55	11	15th
7	Latrobe	Joseph O’Brien (Ireland)	James McDonald	55	22	18th
8	Mustajeer	Kris Lees	Damien Oliver	55	6	23rd
9	Rostropovich	David & Ben Hayes and Tom Dabernig	Dwayne Dunn	55	12	24th
10	Twilight Payment	Joseph O’Brien (Ireland)	Hugh Bowman	55	19	11th
11	Finche	Chris Waller	Kerrin McEvoy	54	4	7th
12	Prince Of Arran (Note: Also known as A Prince of Arran in 2018 Melbourne Cup)	Charlie Fellowes (Great Britain)	Michael Walker	54	8	2nd
13	Raymond Tusk	Richard Hannon Jr (Great Britain)	Jamie Spencer	54	3	16th
14	Downdraft	Joseph O’Brien (Ireland)	John Allen	53.5	15	22nd
15	Magic Wand	Aidan O'Brien (Ireland)	Ryan Moore	53.5	24	10th
16	Neufbosc	David & Ben Hayes and Tom Dabernig	Luke Nolen	53.5	23	21st
17	Sound	Michael Moroney	James Winks	53.5	10	12th
18	Surprise Baby	Paul Preusker	Jordan Childs	53.5	20	5th
19	Constantinople	David & Ben Hayes and Tom Dabernig	João Moreira	52.5	7	13th
20	II Paradiso	Aidan O'Brien (Ireland)	Wayne Lordan	52.5	17	3rd
21	Steel Prince	Anthony Freedman	Brett Prebble	52.5	16	9th
22	The Chosen One	Murray Baker (New Zealand)	Tim Clark	52	18	17th
23	Vow And Declare	Danny O’Brien	Craig Williams	52	21	1st
24	Youngstar	Chris Waller	Tommy Berry	52	9	20th

== Broadcast ==
In 2018, Network 10 bought the rights to air the Melbourne Cup from 2019 to 2023 for $100 million, outbidding former broadcaster Seven Network.
