= W J Healy Stakes =

- Class: Group 3
- Location: Eagle Farm; Brisbane, Australia
- Inaugurated: 1979
- Race type: Thoroughbred – Flat racing
- Sponsor: Eureka Stud (2021-26)

Race information
- Distance: 1,200 metres
- Surface: Turf
- Track: Right-handed
- Qualification: Quality Handicap
- Weight: Minimum weight 54 kg
- Purse: A$200,000 (2026)

The W J Healy Stakes is a Tattersall's Racing Club Group 3 quality handicap race for Thoroughbred horses run over a distance of 1200 metres at Eagle Farm Racecourse, Brisbane, Australia in June.

== History ==
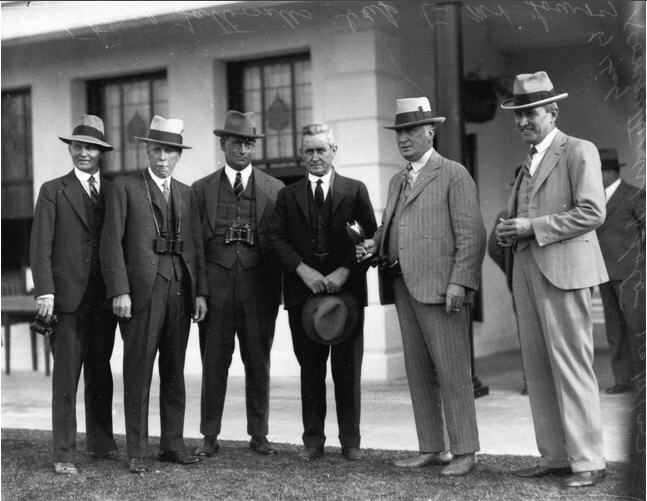
The presentation of the Tattersall's Cup by W. J. Healy at Ascot Racecourse on Saturday 19 August 1933

The race is named in honour of W.J. Healy who was the longest serving President of Tattersall's (1932–1953).

=== Grade ===
- 1992–1996 – Listed Race
- 1997 onwards – Group 3

=== Name ===
- 1979–1989 – W. J. Healy Stakes
- 1990–2004 – Mercedes-Benz Stakes
- 2005 – Carlton Draught Stakes
- 2006–2014 – W. J. Healy Stakes
- 2015 – Tattersall's 150th Anniversary Stakes Handicap
- 2016 – W. J. Healy Stakes

=== Records ===
The race record time of 1:08.68 was set by Hay List in 2010.

=== Venue ===
In 2015, the event was held at Gold Coast Racecourse due to track reconstruction at Eagle Farm.

== Winners ==
The following are past winners of the race.

- 2026 - Yellow Brick
- 2025 - Metalart
- 2024 - Zarastro
- 2023 - Prince Of Boom
- 2022 – Juan Diva
- 2021 – Away Game
- 2020 – ‡race not held
- 2019 – Brave Song
- 2018 – Spright
- 2017 – Burning Passion
- 2016 – Into The Red
- 2015 – Dothraki
- 2014 – Big Money
- 2013 – Howmuchdoyouloveme
- 2012 – River Lad
- 2011 – Pinwheel
- 2010 – Hay List
- 2009 – News Alert
- 2008 – Nuclear Medicine
- 2007 – The Jackal
- 2006 – Natural Destiny
- 2005 – Poetic Papal
- 2004 – Lamond
- 2003 – Super Elegant
- 2002 – Jar Jar Binks
- 2001 – Citichy
- 2000 – El Mirada
- 1999 – Marstic
- 1998 – Quality Kingdom
- 1997 – Blazing Reality
- 1996 – Cangronde
- 1995 – Dancing Dynamite
- 1994 – Sublimate
- 1993 – Capestad
- 1992 – Blalocks Bull
- 1991 – Tinys Finito
- 1990 – McGintys Crown
- 1989 – Clay Hero
- 1988 – Lots of Rule
- 1987 – My Arctic Wolf
- 1986 – Between Ourselves
- 1985 – Kelly's Pool
- 1984 – Faunus
- 1983 – Toy Pindarri
- 1982 – Ideal Planet
- 1981 – Grey Sapphire
- 1980 – Hit It Benny
- 1979 – Painted Red

‡ Not held because of the COVID-19 pandemic

== See also ==
- Tattersall's Cup
- Tattersall's Tiara
- List of Australian Group races
- Group races
