= Vow and Declare =

Australian thoroughbred racehorse

Vow And Declare
- Sire: Declaration of War
- Grandsire: War Front
- Dam: Geblitzt
- Damsire: Testa Rossa
- Sex: Gelding
- Foaled: 17 October 2015
- Country: Australia
- Colour: Chestnut
- Breeder: P Lanskey
- Owner: G Corrigan, PJ Lanskey, HR Hueston, TC Lanskey, JP Lanskey, KT Goodman, WR Leitch, AF Lanskey, BT Lanskey, SWR Knipe, SM Corrigan, LJ Lanskey, SA Livingstone
- Trainer: Danny O'Brien
- Record: 41: 5–8–4
- Earnings: A$ 7,471,670

Major wins
- Melbourne Cup (2019); Tattersall's Cup (2019, 2024); Zipping Classic (2022)

Awards
- Australian Stayer of the Year (2019/20)

Vow And Declare (foaled 17 October 2015) is an Australian bred thoroughbred racehorse that was the winner of the 2019 Melbourne Cup.

== Background ==
Vow And Declare was bred by Paul Lanskey, the owner of the broodmare, Geblitzt. Declaration of War sired the horse whilst performing shuttle stallion duties for Coolmore Stud in Australia. Lanskey named the horse after his father's habit of coming home from the pub and saying "I vow and declare I've only had a few beers".

At the 2017 Inglis Classic Sale, Vow And Declare had a reserve price of $70,000 however only received a bid of up to $45,000. The horse was therefore retained by breeder Paul Lanskey and ownership was divided by Lanskey and others.

== Racing career ==
Trained by Danny O'Brien at Flemington Racecourse, Vow And Declare was unraced as a 2 year old. He claimed his first win as a 3 year old at his fourth start in a Warrnambool maiden run over 2381m in October 2018.

At his next start, Vow And Declare was successful over 1800 metres at Flemington in the Listed TCL TV Stakes when ridden by Damien Oliver.

In June 2019, he ran 2nd in the Group 1 Queensland Derby at odds of 25/1. Jockey Damien Oliver lodged a protest against the winner Mr Quickie however the protest was dismissed by stewards.

Two weeks later the horse won the Tattersall's Cup over 3000 metres at Eagle Farm Racecourse as a 2/1 favourite when ridden by Glen Boss.

Vow And Declare resumed racing as a 4 year old with a 4th placing in the Turnbull Stakes and a second placing in the Caulfield Cup. He started at 10/1 when successful in the 2019 Melbourne Cup when ridden by Craig Williams.

Following a 5th in The Bart Cummings and a 6th in the Caulfield Cup, finishing both within 2 lengths of the winner, Vow And Declare was also entered in the 2022 Melbourne Cup. He drew barrier number 4 and was given 54 kg weight with Blake Shinn aboard. He was placed 10th, 8.7 lengths behind the winner Gold Trip.

Following this he continued to race competitively, including the following results:

- 26/11/22 - 1st in the Zipping Classic beating Luncies and Persan
- 25/2/23 - 2nd in the Victoria Gold Cup (listed 2100m) behind Right You Are with Amada 3rd
- 11/3/23 - 2nd in the Australian Cup Prelude (2000m) behind Right You Are with Emissary 3rd
- 25/3/23 - 4th in the Tancred Stakes behind Arapaho, Montefillia and King Frankel
- 14/10/23 - 2nd in the Caulfield Stakes behind Alligator Blood with Duals 3rd
- 27/10/23 - 2nd in the Moonee Valley Gold Cup behind Cleveland with Future History 3rd
- 7/11/23 - 9th in the 2023 Melbourne Cup won by Without A Fight
- 24/2/24 - 2nd in the Peter Young Stakes behind Campionessa with Gold Trip 3rd
- 30/3/24 - 4th in the Australian Cup behind Cascadian and Pride Of Jenni
- 15/6/24 - 4th in the Q22 behind Fawkner Park and Knight's Choice
- 29/6/24 - 1st in the Tattersall's Cup beating Young Werther and Knight's Choice.

He was retired from racing after running 10th and last in the Pakenham Cup in December 2024.

== Pedigree ==
Pedigree of Vow And Declare (AUS) 2015, chestnut gelding, 2015
Sire Declaration of War (USA) 2009	War Front (USA); 2002	Danzig	Northern Dancer
Sire Declaration of War (USA) 2009	War Front (USA); 2002	Danzig	Pas de Nom
Sire Declaration of War (USA) 2009	War Front (USA); 2002	Starry Dreamer	Rubiano
Sire Declaration of War (USA) 2009	War Front (USA); 2002	Starry Dreamer	Lara's Star
Sire Declaration of War (USA) 2009	Tempo West (USA); 1999	Rahy	Blushing Groom
Sire Declaration of War (USA) 2009	Tempo West (USA); 1999	Rahy	Glorious Song
Sire Declaration of War (USA) 2009	Tempo West (USA); 1999	Tempo	Gone West
Sire Declaration of War (USA) 2009	Tempo West (USA); 1999	Tempo	Terpsichorist
Dam Geblitzt (AUS) 2006	Testa Rossa (AUS); 1996	Perugino	Danzig
Dam Geblitzt (AUS) 2006	Testa Rossa (AUS); 1996	Perugino	Fairy Bridge
Dam Geblitzt (AUS) 2006	Testa Rossa (AUS); 1996	Bo Dapper	Sir Dapper
Dam Geblitzt (AUS) 2006	Testa Rossa (AUS); 1996	Bo Dapper	Bodega
Dam Geblitzt (AUS) 2006	Aim For Gold (AUS); 2000	End Sweep	Forty Niner
Dam Geblitzt (AUS) 2006	Aim For Gold (AUS); 2000	End Sweep	Broom Dance
Dam Geblitzt (AUS) 2006	Aim For Gold (AUS); 2000	Young Vic	Old Vic
Dam Geblitzt (AUS) 2006	Aim For Gold (AUS); 2000	Young Vic	Loralane

== See also ==
- List of Melbourne Cup winners
