= Bahrain Trophy =

Flat horse race in Britain

- Class: Group 3
- Location: July Course; Newmarket, England
- Race type: Flat / Thoroughbred
- Sponsor: Kingdom of Bahrain
- Website: Newmarket

Race information
- Distance: 1m 5f (2,615 metres)
- Surface: Turf
- Track: Right-hand "L"
- Qualification: Three-year-olds
- Weight: 9 st 1 lb Allowances; 3 lb for fillies Penalties; 5 lb for G1 / G2 winners * 3 lb for G3 winners * * after 2018
- Purse: £196,740 (2022); 1st: £113,420

Bahrain Trophy
2026
Point Of Law	Galiyan	Del Maro

Previous years
2025
Scandinavia	Nightime Dancer	Hallelujah
2024
Ancient Wisdom	Royal Supremacy	Portland
2023
Castle Way	Tower Of London	Saint George
2022
Deauville Legend	Al Qareem	Walk Of Stars
2021
Yibir	Mandoob	Dancing King

2020-2011
2020
Al Aasy	Dawn Rising	Al Dabaran
2019
Spanish Mission	Nayef Road	Nate The Great
2018
Wells Farhh Go	Loxley	Giuseppe Garibaldi
2016
Housesofparliament	Platitude	Harrison
2015
Mr Singh	Future Empire	Tommy Docc
2014
Hartnell	Windshear	Forever Now
2013
Feel Like Dancing	Jathabah	Havana Beat
2012
Shantaram	Naseem Alyasmeen	Good Morning Star
2011
Masked Marvel	Census	Zain Al Boldan

2010-2001
2010
Corsica	Harris Tweed	Caucus
2009
Kite Wood	Tactic	Above Average
2008
Donegal	Gravitation	Bouguereau
2007
Tranquil Tiger	Wing Express	Samuel
2006
Youmzain	Jadalee	Degas Art
2005
Mr Vegas	Detroit City	Desert Move
2004
Anousa	Top Seed	Bumptious
2003
Gold Medallist	Discreet Brief	Wavertree Boy
2002
Spanish John	Savannah Bay	Tholjanah
2001
Arrive	Fair Question	Shaandar

2000-1991
2000
Cephalonia	Samsaam	Shuwaib
1999
Moon Dragon	Ashgar	Knockholt
1998
Kahtan	Capri	Ivory Crown
1997
Three Cheers	Winter Garden	Book At Bedtime
1996
Persian Punch	Athenry	Arnhem
1995
Grey Shot	Juyush	Great Crusader
1994
Red Route	Summit	Shonara's Way
1993
Spring To Action	Tioman Island	Magical Retreat
1992
Rain Rider	Bonny Scot	Brier Creek
1991
Jendali	Krius	Strike Fire

1990-1988
1990
River God	Criminal Law	Kasayid
1989
Podrida	Teamster	Fanatical
1988
Cold Marble	Alkharif	Bollin Patrick

The Bahrain Trophy is a Group 3 flat horse race in Great Britain open to three-year-old horses. It is run on the July Course at Newmarket over a distance of 1 mile and 5 furlongs (2,615 metres), and it is scheduled to take place each year in July.

== History ==
The event was formerly known as the H. & K. Commissions Handicap contested over 1 mile, 6 furlongs and 175 yards. It became a Listed race in 1990.

The current name was adopted in 1991, having previously been used for a three-year-old fillies' handicap over 7 furlongs on the same card.

The race was cut to 1 mile and 5 furlongs in 2006. It was promoted to Group 3 status in 2009.

It is now held on the opening day of Newmarket's three-day July Festival meeting, and is often used as a stepping-stone towards the St Leger.

== Records ==
Leading jockey (7 wins):

- Frankie Dettori – Podrida (1989), Spring to Action (1993), Grey Shot (1995), Three Cheers (1997), Kite Wood (2009), Corsica (2010), Mr Singh (2015)

Leading trainer (6 wins):

- John Gosden - Three Cheers (1997), Masked Marvel (2011), Shantaram (2012), Feel like Dancing (2013), Mr Singh (2015), Point Of Law (2026)

== Winners ==
Year	Winner	Jockey	Trainer	Time
1985	Polar Cub	Steve Cauthen	Sir Henry Cecil	3:10.15
1986	Zaubarr	Steve Dawson	Barry Hills	3:14.40
1987	Cockatoo Island	Gary Carter	Gavin Pritchard-Gordon	3:05.42
1988	Cold Marble	John Reid	William Haggas	3:14.03
1989	Podrida	Frankie Dettori	William Jarvis	3:13.42
1990	River God	Steve Cauthen	Sir Henry Cecil	3:09.76
1991	Jendali	Steve Cauthen	Sir Henry Cecil	3:10.58
1992	Rain Rider	Willie Carson	John Dunlop	3:12.72
1993	Spring to Action	Frankie Dettori	Ian Balding	3:06.07
1994	Red Route	Willie Ryan	Sir Henry Cecil	3:12.79
1995	Grey Shot	Frankie Dettori	Ian Balding	3:08.23
1996	Persian Punch	Richard Quinn	David Elsworth	3:06.32
1997	Three Cheers	Frankie Dettori	John Gosden	3:06.68
1998	Kahtan	Richard Hills	John Dunlop	3:06.92
1999	Moon Dragon (Note: Royal Line finished first in 1999, but he was subsequently disqualified after testing positive for a banned substance)	Michael Kinane	Aidan O'Brien	3:05.62
2000	Cephalonia	Pat Eddery	John Dunlop	3:11.04
2001	Arrive	Richard Hughes	Roger Charlton	3:04.27
2002	Spanish John	Kieren Fallon	Paul Cole	3:11.10
2003	Gold Medallist	Kevin Darley	David Elsworth	3:10.02
2004	Anousa	Kieren Fallon	Paul Howling	3:17.83
2005	Mr Vegas	Alan Munro	Peter Chapple-Hyam	3:19.23
2006	Youmzain	Tony Culhane	Mick Channon	2:43.85
2007	Tranquil Tiger	Richard Hughes	Sir Henry Cecil	2:42.11
2008	Donegal	William Buick	Andrew Balding	2:44.83
2009	Kite Wood	Frankie Dettori	Saeed bin Suroor	2:42.01
2010	Corsica	Frankie Dettori	Mark Johnston	2:43.51
2011	Masked Marvel	Jimmy Fortune	John Gosden	2:49.74
2012	Shantaram	William Buick	John Gosden	2:53.07
2013	Feel like Dancing	William Buick	John Gosden	2:45.35
2014	Hartnell	Joe Fanning	Mark Johnston	2:46.29
2015	Mr Singh	Frankie Dettori	John Gosden	2:42.99
2016	Housesofparliament	Ryan Moore	Aidan O'Brien	2:44.39
2017	Raheen House	Jamie Spencer	Brian Meehan	2:44.74
2018	Wells Farhh Go	David Allan	Tim Easterby	2:44.78
2019	Spanish Mission	Jamie Spencer	David Simcock	2:39.96
2020	Al Aasy	Jim Crowley	William Haggas	2:44.92
2021	Yibir	James Doyle	Charlie Appleby	2:46.77
2022	Deauville Legend	Daniel Muscutt	James Ferguson	2:43.17
2023	Castle Way	William Buick	Charlie Appleby	2:47.35
2024	Ancient Wisdom	William Buick	Charlie Appleby	2:49.90
2025	Scandinavia	Ryan Moore	Aidan O'Brien	2:42.30
2026	Point Of Law	James Doyle	John & Thady Gosden	2:45.11

== See also ==
- Horse racing in Great Britain
- List of British flat horse races
