= Geelong Cup =

- Class: Group 3
- Location: Geelong Racecourse, Geelong, Australia
- Inaugurated: 1872
- Race type: Thoroughbred
- Sponsor: Ladbrokes (2024 & 2025)
- Website: Geelong Racing Club

Race information
- Distance: 2,400 metres
- Surface: Turf
- Track: Left-handed
- Qualification: Open
- Weight: Handicap
- Purse: $500,000 (2025)

The Geelong Cup is a Geelong Racing Club Group 3 Thoroughbred horse race, held under handicap conditions over a distance of 2400 metres at the Geelong Racecourse, Geelong, Victoria, Australia on a Wednesday in late October.

The race is considered one of the most reliable guides to the result of the Melbourne Cup.

== History ==
The race is run thirteen days before the Melbourne Cup (which is always on the first Tuesday in November). The race has been run on this day since 1947. The day of the race is a public holiday in the city of Geelong. Before 1907 the race was run at the Marshalltown Racecourse. Before 1947 the race was run at various times during the year between January and July.

=== Distance ===
- 1872–1885 – 2 miles (~3200 metres)
- 1886–1892 – 1 3/4 miles (~2800 metres)
- 1893–1894, 1899, 1970–1971 – 1 1/2 miles (~2400 metres)
- 1900, 1965–1969 – about 1 1/2 miles (~2400 metres)
- 1895, 1901–1906, 1910–1911, 1919, 1951–1960 – 1 3/8 miles (~2200 metres)
- 1961–1964 – about 1 3/8 miles (~2200 metres)
- 1927–1934, 1937, 1947–1950 – 10 furlongs & 192 yards (~2187 metres)
- 1922–1926 – 10 furlongs & 182 yards (~2178 metres)
- 1896, 1898, 1909, 1916–1917 – 1 1/4 miles (~2000 metres)
- 1921 – about 1 1/4 miles (~2000 metres)
- 1912–1913, 1915, 1918 – 1 1/8 miles (~1800 metres)
- 1914 – 1 mile (~1600 metres)
- 1972–2007 – 2400 metres
- 2008–2009 – 2406 metres
- 2010 onwards – 2400 metres

=== Grade ===
- 1872–1978 – Principal Race
- 1979–2001 – Listed race
- 2002 onwards – Group 3

=== Doubles wins ===
The following thoroughbreds have won the Geelong Cup – Melbourne Cup in the same year.

- Media Puzzle (2002)
- Americain (2010)
- Dunaden (2011)
- Point Of Law (2026)

== Winners ==
The following are past winners of the race.

- 2026 - Point Of Law
- 2025 - Torranzino
- 2024 – Onesmoothoperator
- 2023 – Amade
- 2022 – Emissary
- 2021 – Tralee Rose
- 2020 – Steel Prince
- 2019 – Prince of Arran
- 2018 – Runaway
- 2017 – Vengeur Masque
- 2016 – Qewy
- 2015 – Almoonqith
- 2014 – Caravan Rolls On
- 2013 – Ibicenco
- 2012 – Gatewood
- 2011 – Dunaden
- 2010 – Americain
- 2009 – Leica Ding
- 2008 – Bauer
- 2007 – The Fuzz
- 2006 – Mandela
- 2005 – On A Jeune
- 2004 – Pacific Dancer
- 2003 – Zazzman
- 2002 – Media Puzzle
- 2001 – Karasi
- 2000 – Savrocca
- 1999 – Bohemiath
- 1998 – Ancient City
- 1997 – Oregon Star
- 1996 – Hereditas
- 1995 – Anfitrion
- 1994 – Grass Valley
- 1993 – Ultimate Aim
- 1992 – Ali Boy
- 1991 – Newbury Star
- 1990 – Mr. Brooker
- 1989 – † Pacific Mirage / Sea Legend
- 1988 – Our Classic Bay
- 1987 – Beau Trist
- 1986 – Fil De Roi
- 1985 – Koiro Corrie May
- 1984 – Chagemar
- 1983 – Deb's Mate
- 1982 – Gujarat
- 1981 – Allez Bijou
- 1980 – Summer Fleur
- 1979 – Hauberk
- 1978 – Puramaka
- 1977 – Brallos
- 1976 – Taminga
- 1975 – Dowling Girl
- 1974 – Special Test
- 1973 – Australasia
- 1972 – Hayburner
- 1971 – Gnapur
- 1970 – Vansittart
- 1969 – Double Steel
- 1968 – Bergman
- 1967 – Royal Coral
- 1966 – Craftsman
- 1965 – Pleasanton
- 1964 – Jamagne
- 1963 – Nivek
- 1962 – Napoleon
- 1961 – Ursalon
- 1960 – Tabess
- 1959 – Paratone
- 1958 – Mac
- 1957 – King Boru
- 1956 – Prince Abbott
- 1955 – November Moon
- 1954 – Chidden
- 1953 – meeting abandoned
- 1952 – Welkin Sun
- 1951 – Trust Me
- 1950 – Purple Prince
- 1949 – Blank Music
- 1948 – Royal Scot
- 1947 – Bruin
- 1938–46 – race not held
- 1937 – Lord Carrington
- 1935–36 – race not held
- 1934 – † Viol D'Amour / Highway
- 1933 – Bay of Islands
- 1932 – Glaive
- 1931 – El Rey
- 1930 – race not held
- 1930 – Taras
- 1929 – Sea Pilot
- 1928 – Anan Louise
- 1927 – Victorian King
- 1926 – Bombard
- 1925 – Glaxy
- 1924 – Lillirie
- 1923 – Mount Bernard
- 1922 – Tresco
- 1921 – Rahda
- 1920 – race not held
- 1919 – Luteplayer
- 1918 – Blackwood
- 1917 – Mnesarchus
- 1916 – Lady Mooltan
- 1915 – Pouter
- 1914 – Roseview
- 1913 – Porch
- 1912 – Roseview
- 1911 – Crete
- 1910 – Orline
- 1909 – Tantalla
- 1907–08 – race not held
- 1906 – Maninga
- 1905 – Cluster
- 1904 – Mallard
- 1903 – Telemachus
- 1902 – Merryman
- 1901 – Marie Corelli
- 1900 – Model
- 1899 – Relic
- 1898 – Chit Chat
- 1897 – race not held
- 1896 – Pivot
- 1895 – J5
- 1894 – The Clown
- 1893 – Newman
- 1892 – Norbert
- 1891 – Tantallon
- 1890 – Britannia
- 1889 – Malua
- 1888 – Gardenia
- 1887 – Camerine
- 1886 – Claptrap
- 1885 – Camerine
- 1884 – Linda
- 1883 – Gudarz
- 1882 – Guinea
- 1881 – Progress
- 1880 – Zambesi
- 1879 – Lord Harry
- 1878 – Newminster
- 1877 – Pride of the Hills
- 1876 – Emulation
- 1875 – Melbourne
- 1874 – Mccallum Mohn
- 1873 – Leo
- 1872 – Flying Scud

† Dead heat

== See also ==
- List of Australian Group races
- Group races
