= Sir Dragonet =

Irish-bred Thoroughbred racehorse

- Sire: Camelot
- Grandsire: Montjeu
- Dam: Sparrow
- Damsire: Oasis Dream
- Sex: Stallion
- Foaled: 9 February 2016
- Died: 16 October 2021 (aged 5)
- Country: Ireland
- Colour: Brown
- Breeder: Orpendale, Chelston & Wynatt
- Trainer: Aidan O'Brien (2019-2020); Ciaron Maher & David Eustace (2020-2021)
- Jockey: Glen Boss
- Record: 19: 4–4–1
- Earnings: AU$5,055,170

Major wins
- Chester Vase (2019); W. S. Cox Plate (2020); Tancred Stakes (2021)

Sir Dragonet (9 February 2016 – 16 October 2021) was an Irish bred thoroughbred racehorse that won two Group One races in Australia, most notably the 2020 W. S. Cox Plate.

== Background ==
Sir Dragonet is the son of Camelot who was the European Champion Three-Year-Old Colt in 2012.

His mother, Sparrow, was stakes placed when finishing third in the Ballyogan Stakes. She also produced Sir Dragonet's full-brother, Sir Lucan, winner of the Yeats Stakes.

== Racing career ==
Sir Dragonet won his first two starts in 2019, a maiden race at Tipperary and then the Group III Chester Vase by a margin of eight lengths.

The owners Coolmore paid an £85,000 late entry fee for the horse to take part in the 2019 Epsom Derby. Starting the 11/4 favourite and ridden by Ryan Moore, Sir Dragonet was one of 7 horses in the race trained by Aidan O'Brien. In a "blanket finish", and after leading the field with two furlongs to travel, he was beaten by just three quarters of a length in 5th position by stable mate Anthony Van Dyck.

Sir Dragonet would have a further six runs in Europe without success, with his last start being a second placing behind Magical in the 2020 Tattersalls Gold Cup. The horse was then sold for an undisclosed sum to Australian buyers and the horse was sent to Australia to continue racing.

On the 24 October 2020, Sir Dragonet contested his first race in Australia, the 100th running of the W. S. Cox Plate at Moonee Valley. He came from midfield to win by a length-and-a-half. The win gave jockey Glen Boss his 4th win in the race.

Sir Dragonet then took his place in the 2020 Melbourne Cup at Flemington. Starting at odds of 12/1 he finished in 6th place beaten three-and-a-half lengths.

After a further three unplaced runs, Sir Dragonet won his second Group One when winning the 2021 Tancred Stakes at Rosehill. This would prove to be the horses final win in his career.

On the 16 October 2021, Sir Dragonet broke down during track-work at Moonee Valley and had to be euthanised on course. He was having his final piece of work a week before he attempted to defend his win in the Cox Plate. It is believed he faltered just 800 metres into his gallop. Trainer Ciaron Maher spoke of the incident, "We’re heartbroken to announce that Sir Dragonet has broken down during a piece of work at Moonee Valley. In the year that the Dragon has been in our care, he has won our hearts with his exploits both on and off the track."

== Pedigree ==
Pedigree of Sir Dragonet (IRE) 2016
Sire Camelot (GB) 2009	Montjeu (IRE); 1996	Sadler's Wells	Northern Dancer
Sire Camelot (GB) 2009	Montjeu (IRE); 1996	Sadler's Wells	Fairy Bridge
Sire Camelot (GB) 2009	Montjeu (IRE); 1996	Floripedes	Top Ville
Sire Camelot (GB) 2009	Montjeu (IRE); 1996	Floripedes	Toute Cy
Sire Camelot (GB) 2009	Tarfah (USA); 2001	Kingmambo	Mr. Prospector
Sire Camelot (GB) 2009	Tarfah (USA); 2001	Kingmambo	Miesque
Sire Camelot (GB) 2009	Tarfah (USA); 2001	Fickle	Danehill
Sire Camelot (GB) 2009	Tarfah (USA); 2001	Fickle	Fade
Dam Sparrow (GB) 2011	Oasis Dream (USA); 2000	Green Desert	Danzig
Dam Sparrow (GB) 2011	Oasis Dream (USA); 2000	Green Desert	Foreign Courier
Dam Sparrow (GB) 2011	Oasis Dream (USA); 2000	Hope	Dancing Brave
Dam Sparrow (GB) 2011	Oasis Dream (USA); 2000	Hope	Bahamian
Dam Sparrow (GB) 2011	All Too Beautiful (IRE); 2001	Sadler's Wells	Northern Dancer
Dam Sparrow (GB) 2011	All Too Beautiful (IRE); 2001	Sadler's Wells	Fairy Bridge
Dam Sparrow (GB) 2011	All Too Beautiful (IRE); 2001	Urban Sea	Miswaki
Dam Sparrow (GB) 2011	All Too Beautiful (IRE); 2001	Urban Sea	Allegretta
