= Storming Home =

British-bred Thoroughbred racehorse

- Sire: Machiavellian
- Grandsire: Mr. Prospector
- Dam: Try To Catch Me
- Damsire: Shareef Dancer
- Sex: Stallion
- Foaled: 14 May 1998
- Country: Great Britain
- Colour: Dark Bay or Brown
- Breeder: Gainsborough Stud
- Owner: Sheikh Maktoum Al Maktoum
- Trainer: Barry Hills; Neil Drysdale
- Record: 22: 6-5-2
- Earnings: £1,001,091

Major wins
- King Edward VII Stakes (2001); Godolphin Stakes (2002); Champion Stakes (2002); Jim Murray Memorial Handicap (2003); Clement L. Hirsch Turf Championship Stakes (2003); Charles Whittingham Memorial Handicap (2003)
- Last updated on October 12, 2006

Storming Home is a retired, British-bred Thoroughbred racehorse and active sire who was trained in the United Kingdom and the United States during a racing career which ran from 2000 to 2003. He won five important races, but is probably best known for his disqualification in the 2003 Arlington Million.

== Background ==
Storming Home was a home-bred, being a product of his owner Maktoum Al Maktoum's Gainsborough Stud (now part of the Darley Stud group). Sired by the influential stallion Machiavellian, his dam was Try To Catch Me, a daughter of the American Champion Two-Year-Old Filly, It's In The Air.

He is inbred 2x3 to Mr. Prospector, meaning that this stallion appears in both the second and third generations of Storming Home's pedigree (see below).

Storming Home was sent into training with Barry Hills at Lambourn and was ridden by his trainer's son Michael in most of his European starts. He was later transferred to Neil Drysdale in California, where Gary Stevens took over as his regular jockey. Although among the highest-rated horses in the world at his peak, he had a reputation for being inconsistent and temperamental and often raced in some form of headgear to help his concentration

== Racing career ==
=== 2000: two-year-old season ===
Storming Home ran four times as a two-year-old in 2000. After finishing unplaced in a maiden race at Kempton he recorded his first victory by winning a similar event at Newmarket in August.

He was then moved up in class for the Group Three Solario Stakes at Sandown Park Racecourse two weeks later. He showed himself to be a colt of some ability by finishing strongly after being unable to find space to run in the straight, and taking second place, half a length behind King's Ironbridge. On his final start of the year he ran unplaced in the Somerville Tattersall Stakes, behind horses including future Group One winners Grandera and Imperial Dancer.

His official rating of 109 placed him among the top forty European colts of the year, ten pounds below the highweight Minardi.

=== 2001: three-year-old season ===
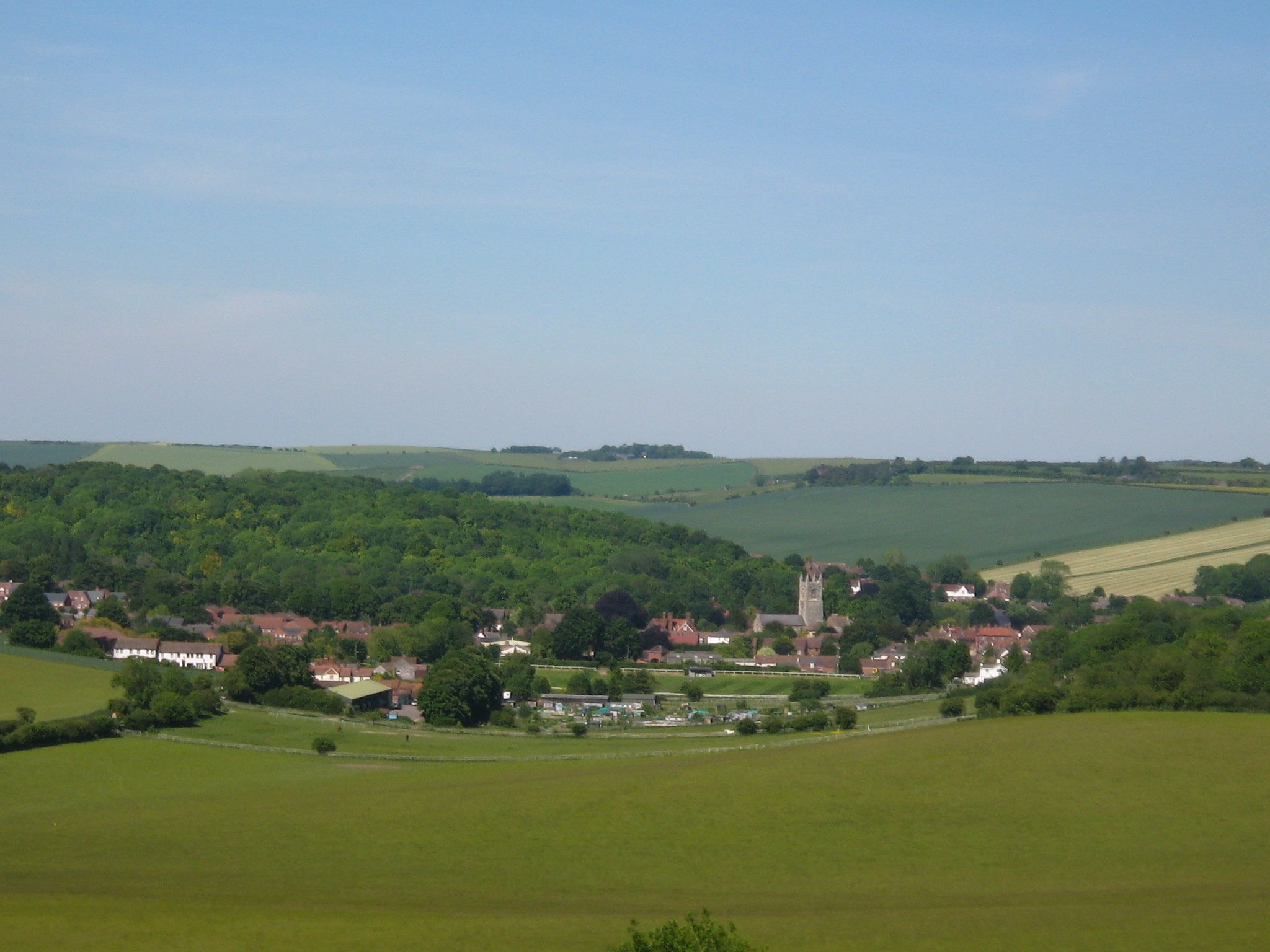
Lambourn:Storming Home's base for his first three seasons

At three, he was aimed at the Derby. On his debut he showed his ability to cope with the Derby course with a win in the Blue Riband Trial at Epsom, taking the lead two furlongs from the finish and drawing clear to win by four lengths. He then finished strongly to take a close third in the Group Two Dante Stakes at York, after which he was offered at odds of 20-1 for the Derby. Michael Hills had the choice of three colts trained by his father for the race and selected Storming Home, although he admitted that the decision had not been easy. In the classic he started at 14–1, and ran up to expectations, staying on in the straight to finish fifth of the twelve runners, six lengths behind Galileo.

At Royal Ascot two weeks later, he recorded his first important win by taking the Group Two King Edward VII Stakes from Snowstorm, with the favourite Milan, well beaten in the fourth. Barry Hills commented on the colt's promise after the race: "The penny is finally dropping with him and I think there may be more improvement to come." Hills demonstrated his confidence by next running Storming Home in the King George VI and Queen Elizabeth Stakes over the same course and distance the following month. Storming Home started at 25-1 and exceeded expectations by staying on to finish fourth to Galileo, beaten three lengths.

At York a month later, he was made favourite for the Great Voltigeur Stakes but was unable to confirm his earlier form with Milan, who defeated him by a length and a half. His season ended after a disappointing performance in the Prix Niel.

=== 2002: four-year-old season ===
Storming Home's fourth year began with placed efforts in the Jockey Club Stakes, Coronation Cup and Hardwicke Stakes, after which he finished sixth in his second in his second attempt at the "King George". Dropped in class, he disappointed again, when beaten favourite in a listed race at Doncaster. He was becoming a frustrating horse to follow having lost eight races in a row, three of them when starting favourite. One opinion was that Storming Home had "developed his own ideas about the game", a euphemism used to imply that a horse is temperamentally unreliable.

Barry Hills took the decision to fit the colt with cheek-pieces to improve his concentration, and the experiment was successful. An easy, six-length win in the listed Godolphin Stakes, was followed by a return to the top level in the Group One Champion Stakes at Newmarket. Sent off at 8–1, he raced prominently, took the lead a furlong out, and stayed on strongly to defeat the subsequent Dubai World Cup winner Moon Ballad by half a length. Michael Hills emphasised the importance of the cheek-pieces, saying that they had "made a big difference to him and he just travels so much better; it is much easier to ride a race on him now". His father, whilst pleased with the result, pointed out that Storming Home was "not a straightforward horse."

His season ended with an unplaced effort in the Japan Cup. His trainer offered no real excuses: "The draw didn't help. He was going well for a while but ran out of petrol".

=== 2003: five-year-old season ===
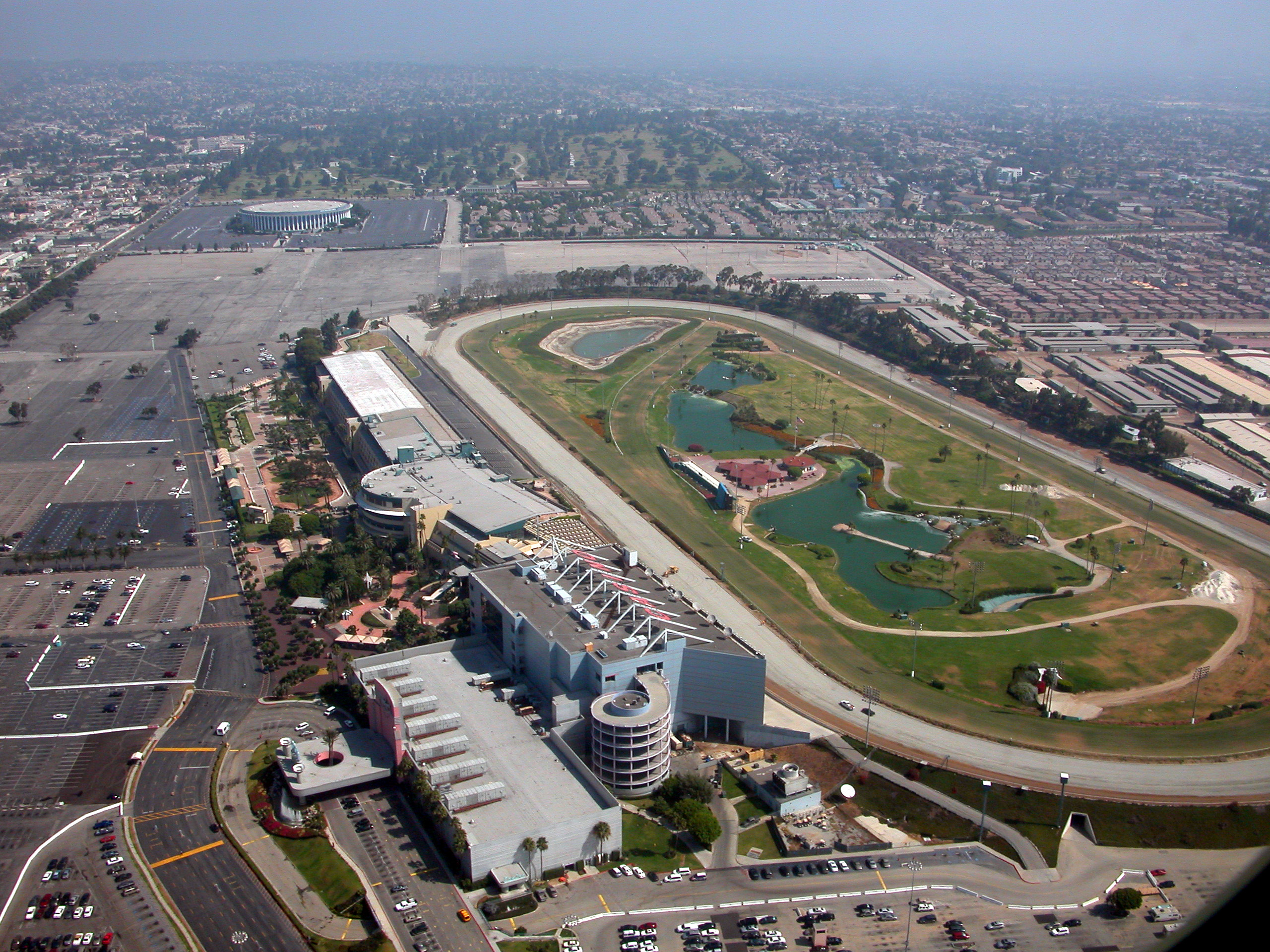
Hollywood Park: The starting point for Storming Home's American campaign in 2003

In December 2002, Storming Home was exported to California, where he entered the stable of Neil Drysdale. He clearly thrived his new environment, and had his most successful season in terms of both wins and prize money. In May, he won the Grade II Jim Murray Memorial Handicap at Hollywood Park, where he equalled the race record of 2:25.20 despite starting slowly. One correspondent described the performance as "electrifying"

At the same track a month later he followed up with an odds-on victory in the Grade I Charles Whittingham Memorial Handicap, in which he came from last place to win after Gary Stevens was forced to take him to the extreme outside entering the straight.

These performances saw him sent-off a 3-1 second favourite for the 21st running of the Arlington Million in Chicago. Held up at the rear of the field, he produced a powerful run to take the lead a furlong out. He was pressed in the closing stages by the international challengers Kaieteur (Britain), Paolini (Germany) and Sulamani (UAE/Britain), but seemed to be holding on for the victory when an extraordinary incident occurred. Twenty yards from the line, he seemed to be "spooked" by something on the infield and veered violently to the right, bumping Kaieteur and Paolini and unseating Gary Stevens as he crossed the line. He finished half a length ahead of Sulamani, with Kaieteur and Paolini a head further behind in a dead-heat for third, but Objections and a Steward's Inquiry followed. The closeness of the race for second led the Stewards to conclude that the incident had affected the result and Storming Home was disqualified, with the race being awarded to Sulamani, who had not been directly affected by the interference. The decision was greeted with boos by the Chicago crowd.

Stevens suffered injuries to his shoulder, chest and back, but made a quick recovery. He was back as the jockey when Storming Home reappeared at Santa Anita Park six weeks later in the Grade I Clement L. Hirsch Turf Championship Stakes. Although Drysdale was concerned when the field were "dawdling" in the early stages, Storming Home produced a strong late run to catch Johar close to the finish and take the race by half a length. Stevens called the performance "a sweet vindication".

On his final racecourse appearance, Storming Home was sent off the 9/4 favourite for the Breeders' Cup Turf, but failed to give his running, finishing seventh behind the dead-heaters Johar and High Chaparral, in a performance which Stevens was at a loss to explain.

== Assessment ==
In the 2000 International Classification Storming Home was rated 109 as noted above. A year later he was rated 124, making him the fourth highest rated three-year-old colt in Europe and the eighth highest in the world. In 2002 he was rated 121, making him the ninth highest rated older horse in Europe.

In the 2003 edition of the World Thoroughbred Racehorse Rankings Storming Home was rated at 122, making him the fourth-best older male in North America and the twentieth-best horse to race in the world that year. This placed him several pounds behind Johar and Sulamani, despite the fact that he had "beaten" both of them.

Storming Home's highest Timeform rating was 128.

He finished runner-up to High Chaparral in the voting for the 2003 Eclipse Award for Best Male Turf Horse.

== Stud career ==
Storming Home was retired to the Nunnery Stud at the end of his racing career. He was also "shuttled" to stand at the Karaka stallion station in New Zealand for the Southern Hemisphere breeding season. More recently, he has been standing at the Darley Stud in Japan. He has had some success, siring notable winners, including Lion Tamer (Victoria Derby), Jakkalberry (Gran Premio di Milano) and Flying Cloud (Ribblesdale Stakes).

== Pedigree ==
Pedigree of Storming Home (GB), dark bay or brown stallion, 1998
Sire Machiavellian (USA) 1987	Mr. Prospector*; 1970	Raise a Native	Native Dancer
Sire Machiavellian (USA) 1987	Mr. Prospector*; 1970	Raise a Native	Raise You
Sire Machiavellian (USA) 1987	Mr. Prospector*; 1970	Gold Digger	Nashua
Sire Machiavellian (USA) 1987	Mr. Prospector*; 1970	Gold Digger	Sequence
Sire Machiavellian (USA) 1987	Coup de Folie; 1982	Halo	Hail To Reason
Sire Machiavellian (USA) 1987	Coup de Folie; 1982	Halo	Cosmah
Sire Machiavellian (USA) 1987	Coup de Folie; 1982	Raise The Standard	Hoist The Flag
Sire Machiavellian (USA) 1987	Coup de Folie; 1982	Raise The Standard	Natalma
Dam Try To Catch Me (USA) 1986	Shareef Dancer; 1980	Northern Dancer	Nearctic
Dam Try To Catch Me (USA) 1986	Shareef Dancer; 1980	Northern Dancer	Natalma
Dam Try To Catch Me (USA) 1986	Shareef Dancer; 1980	Sweet Alliance	Sir Ivor
Dam Try To Catch Me (USA) 1986	Shareef Dancer; 1980	Sweet Alliance	Mrs. Peterkin
Dam Try To Catch Me (USA) 1986	It's In The Air; 1976	Mr. Prospector*	Raise a Native
Dam Try To Catch Me (USA) 1986	It's In The Air; 1976	Mr. Prospector*	Gold Digger
Dam Try To Catch Me (USA) 1986	It's In The Air; 1976	A Wind Is Rising	Francis S.
Dam Try To Catch Me (USA) 1986	It's In The Air; 1976	A Wind Is Rising	Queen Nasra (Family: 4-k)

- Storming Home is inbred 2x3 to Mr. Prospector.
