= Godolphin Stakes =

Flat horse race in Britain

Godolphin Stakes
2025
Lion's Pride	Isle Of Jura	By The Book

Previous years
2024
Burdett Road	Military Academy	Aimeric
2023
Tregony	New London	Lion's Pride
2022
Siskany	Without A Fight	Passion And Glory
2021
Without A Fight	Fox Tal	John Leeper

2020-2011
2020
Walton Street	Aloe Vera	Laafy
2019
Mountain Hunter	Loxley	Weekender
2018
Communique	Barsanti	Maid To Remember
2017
Frontiersman	Red Galileo	Best Of Days
2016
Dal Harraild	Barsanti	Star Storm
2015
Cannock Chase	Tashaar	Havana Beat
2014
Nabucco	Red Galileo	Ayrad
2013
Renew	Wigmore Hall	Testudo
2012
Retrieve	Harris Tweed	Songcraft
2011
Mahbooba	Al Shemali	All The Aces

2010-2001
2010
Myplacelater	Dreamspeed	Wajir
2009
Chock A Block	Drill Sergeant	Funday
2008
Buccellati	Classic Punch	Speed Gifted
2007
Galactic Star	Munsef	Soapy Danger
2006
Degas Art	Into The Dark	Mashaahed
2005
Munsef	Defining	Australië
2004
Private Charter	Fantastic Love	Shanty Star
2003
Ekraar	Compton Bolter	Piano Star
2002
Storming Home	Mutakarrim	Hannibal Lad
2001
Mubtaker	Hatha Anna	Dramatic Quest

2000-1991
2000
Wellbeing	Pawn Broker	Hiddnah
1999
Kahtan	Migration	Lightning Arrow
1998
Innuendo	Ivan Luis	Jazil
1997
Mons	Memorise	The Fly
1996
Busy Flight	Key To My Heart	Sharaf Kabeer
1995
Minds Music	Mack The Knife	Warning Order
1994
Sadler's Image	Strategic Choice	Kithanga
1993
Muhayaa	Peter Quince	Persian Brave
1992
Zinaad	Sonus	Steerforth
1991
Surrealist	Red Rainbow	Libk

1990-1988
1990
Spritsail	Ahead	Per Quod
1989
Spritsail	Sesame	Timourtash
1988
Apache	Per Quod	Nayrizi

The Godolphin Stakes is a Listed flat horse race in Great Britain open to horses aged three years. It is run at Newmarket over a distance of 1 mile and 4 furlongs (2,413 metres), and it is scheduled to take place each year in September. Prior to 2026 the race was also open to horses aged four and over.

== Winners ==
Year	Winner	Age	Jockey	Trainer	Time
1987	All Haste (Note: Timefighter finished first in 1987, but was disqualified for interference)	4	Steve Cauthen	Henry Cecil	2:35.96
1988	Apache	3	Jimmy Bleasdale	Chris Thornton	2:31.24
1989	Spritsail	3	Steve Cauthen	Henry Cecil	2:31.89
1990	Spritsail	4	Steve Cauthen	Henry Cecil	2:27.55
1991	Surrealist	3	Steve Cauthen	Barry Hills	2:28.92
1992	Zinaad	3	Pat Eddery	Michael Stoute	2:28.77
1993	Muhayaa	4	Walter Swinburn	Alex Scott	2:34.79
1994	Sadler's Image	3	Michael Kinane	Michael Stoute	2:28.27
1995	Minds Music	3	Pat Eddery	Henry Cecil	2:30.36
1996	Busy Flight	3	Michael Hills	Barry Hills	2:28.19
1997	Mons	4	Frankie Dettori	Luca Cumani	2:33.65
1998	Innuendo	3	Frankie Dettori	Luca Cumani	2:33.99
1999 (Note: The 1999 race was run on the July Course at Newmarket)	Kahtan	4	Gary Carter	John Dunlop	2:33.54
2000	Wellbeing	3	Richard Quinn	Henry Cecil	2:32.85
2001	Mubtaker	4	Richard Hills	Marcus Tregoning	2:31.40
2002	Storming Home	4	Michael Hills	Barry Hills	2:29.65
2003	Ekraar	6	Richard Hills	Marcus Tregoning	2:28.18
2004	Private Charter	4	Michael Hills	Barry Hills	2:31.51
2005	Munsef	3	Richard Hills	John Dunlop	2:32.09
2006	Degas Art	3	Kerrin McEvoy	David Elsworth	2:35.66
2007	Galactic Star	4	Ryan Moore	Sir Michael Stoute	2:34.49
2008	Buccellati	4	William Buick	Andrew Balding	2:28.28
2009	Chock A Block	3	Frankie Dettori	Saeed bin Suroor	2:29.27
2010	Myplacelater	3	William Buick	David Elsworth	2:41.35
2011	Mahbooba	4	Pat Cosgrave	Mike de Kock	2:28.56
2012	Retrieve	6	Frankie Dettori	Saeed bin Suroor	2:29.82
2013	Renew	3	Martin Harley	Marco Botti	2:34.51
2014	Nabucco	5	William Buick	John Gosden	2:28.97
2015	Tashaar (Note: Cannock Chase finished first in 2015, but was disqualified after testing positive for a prohibited substance)	3	Frankie Dettori	Richard Hannon Jr.	2:32.38
2016	Dal Harraild	3	Pat Cosgrave	William Haggas	2:30.48
2017	Frontiersman	4	James Doyle	Charlie Appleby	2:32.84
2018	Communique	3	Ryan Moore	Mark Johnston	2:32.62
2019	Mountain Hunter	5	Oisin Murphy	Saeed bin Suroor	2:31.22
2020	Walton Street	6	James Doyle	Charlie Appleby	2:28.07
2021	Without A Fight	4	Andrea Atzeni	Simon & Ed Crisford	2:28.24
2022	Siskany	4	William Buick	Charlie Appleby	2:32.70
2023	Tregony	5	Saffie Osborne	Clive Cox	2:29.43
2024	Burdett Road	4	Harry Davies	James Owen	2:34.95
2025	Lion's Pride	5	Robert Havlin	John & Thady Gosden	2:30.34
2026	Fortitudine	3	William Buick	Charlie Appleby	2:30.81

== See also ==
- Horse racing in Great Britain
- List of British flat horse races
