= Robbie Dolan =

Irish jockey

Robert Dolan
Personal information
- Nickname: Robbie Dolan
- Born: 1996 (age 29–30) Kildare, Ireland
- Occupation: Jockey
- Weight: 53 kg (117 lb)
- Children: 1

Horse racing career
- Sport: Horse racing
- Career wins: 400 3-2-3

Major racing wins
- Melbourne Cup; Spring Champion Stakes G1; The Galaxy G1; 18 Stakes or Group Wins

Racing awards
- 2 Champion Apprentice Sydney

Significant horses
- Knight's Choice

Robbie Dolan (aged 28) is an Irish thoroughbred racing jockey. On 5 November 2024, Dolan rode the winning horse Knight's Choice in the 2024 Melbourne Cup.

In 2022, Dolan appeared on the 11th season of Australian TV series The Voice, where he advanced through the Callbacks, as well as winning his battle. In the callbacks he would face Lachie Gill and would be eliminated by the eventual winner of season 11. Dolan was eliminated during the battles. Hours after his Melbourne Cup win in 2024, he sang with fellow Irish singer Ronan Keating.
