= It's in the Air (horse) =

American-bred Thoroughbred racehorse

It's In The Air
- Sire: Mr. Prospector
- Grandsire: Raise A Native
- Dam: A Wind Is Rising
- Damsire: Francis S.
- Sex: Filly
- Foaled: 1976
- Country: United States
- Color: Bay
- Breeder: Happy Valley Farm
- Owner: 1) Jerry Frankel; 2) Harbor View Farm; 3) Due Process Stable
- Trainer: 1) Lou M. Goldfine; 2) Laz Barrera
- Record: 43: 16-9-6
- Earnings: US$892,339

Major wins
- Arlington-Washington Lassie Stakes (1978); Oak Leaf Stakes (1978); Ruffian Handicap (1979); Alabama Stakes (1979); Delaware Oaks (1979); Vanity Handicap (1979, 1980); El Encino Stakes (1980)

Awards
- American Co-Champion Two-Year-Old Filly (1978)

Honors
- It's In The Air Stakes at Hollywood Park

It's In The Air (foaled 1976 in Florida) was an American Champion filly Thoroughbred racehorse.

== Background ==
Bred by Steve and Gary Wolfson's Happy Valley Farm, It's In The Air was from the first crop of Mr. Prospector and out of the mare A Wind Is Rising. She was sold as a weanling for $25,000 to Jerry Frankel, who entrusted her race conditioning to trainer Lou Goldfine.

== Racing career ==
It's In The Air made five starts at age two for Jerry Frankel, winning three and finishing second in the other two. After she won the 1978 Mademoiselle Stakes at Arlington Park, Frankel sold her for $300,000 to Louis Wolfson, patriarch of the family who had bred her. The day after Wolfson purchased the filly, she won the Arlington-Washington Lassie Stakes, after which he transferred her to trainer Laz Barrera, who won that year's U.S. Triple Crown for Wolfson with Affirmed. Sent to California, in her final race of 1978, It's In The Air won the Oak Leaf Stakes at Santa Anita Park. Her 1978 performances saw her voted the co-winner with Candy Éclair of the Eclipse Award as American Champion Two-Year-Old Filly.

At age three, It's In The Air again raced on both the East and West coasts of the United States. She won four Grade I stakes in 1979, including the Delaware Oaks and the first of two straight editions of the Vanity Handicap at Hollywood Park Racetrack. Racing at age four, in addition to her win in the 1980 Vanity, It's In The Air won the El Encino Stakes at Santa Anita Park. She did not win a stakes race in her final campaign at age five, with her best result a second to Misty Gallore in the 1981 Distaff Handicap at Aqueduct Racetrack.

== Breeding record ==
Retired to broodmare duty, It's In The Air stood in the United States and in Great Britain. From her matings, she produced foals by Northern Dancer, Nijinsky, Seattle Slew, Sadler's Wells, Green Desert, Shadeed, and Zilzal. Among them were six winners, none of which achieved significant Grade/Group wins. Her daughter Try To Catch Me (by Shareef Dancer) did, however, produce the multiple Grade I/Group One winner Storming Home.
