= Tattersall's Cup =

Tattersall's Cup Handicap
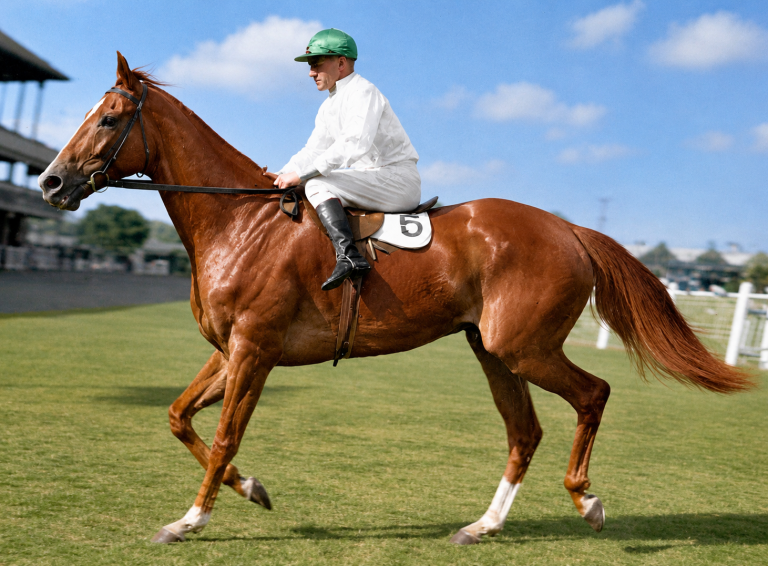
- Lough Neagh, 1932 winner
- Class: Group 3
- Location: Eagle Farm; Brisbane, Australia
- Inaugurated: 1924
- Race type: Thoroughbred – Flat racing

Race information
- Distance: 2,400 metres
- Surface: Turf
- Track: Right-handed
- Qualification: Quality Handicap
- Weight: Minimum weight 54 kg
- Purse: A$200,000 (2026)

The Tattersall's Cup Handicap is a Tattersall's Racing Club Group 3 open handicap race for Thoroughbred horses run over a distance of 2,400 metres at Eagle Farm Racecourse, Queensland in June.

== History ==
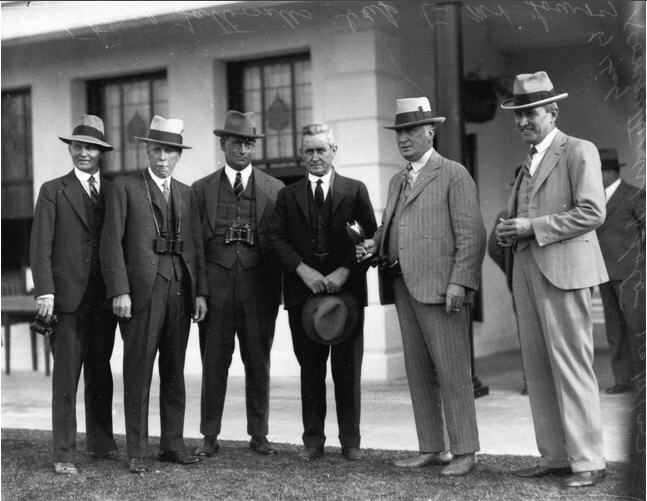
The presentation of the Tattersall's Cup by W. J. Healy at Ascot Racecourse on Saturday 19 August 1933

The inaugural running of the race was in 1924 when Serelot won.
During World War II the Tattersall's Race club held the race at Albion Park Racecourse, the only functioning racecourse in Brisbane at the time. The 1987 winner, the New Zealand bred gelding Kensei went on later in the year to win the Melbourne Cup, as did 2019 winner Vow And Declare. Between 1985 and 1987 the race was known as the Castlemaine Gold Cup.

=== Grade ===
- 1924–1979 – Principal Race
- 1980 onwards – Group 3

=== Venue ===
- 1924–1941 – Ascot Racecourse
- 1943–1945 – Albion Park Racecourse
- 1946–2014 – Eagle Farm Racecourse
- 2015 – Gold Coast Racecourse
- 2016 – Eagle Farm Racecourse
- 2017–2018 – Doomben Racecourse
- 2019 onwards – Eagle Farm Racecourse

=== Distance ===
- 1924–1941 – 1 1/4 miles
- 1943–1945 – 1 mile 57 yards
- 1946–1972 – 1 1/4 miles
- 1973 – 2200 metres
- 1974 – 2225 metres
- 1975–1976 – 2200 metres
- 1977 – 2212 metres
- 1978–1982 – 2200 metres
- 1983 – 2270 metres
- 1984 – 2244 metres
- 1985–1986 – 2225 metres
- 1987 – 2236 metres
- 1988 – 2232 metres
- 1989 – 2236 metres
- 1990 – 2200 metres
- 1991 – 2225 metres
- 1992–1993 – 2200 metres
- 1994 – 2212 metres
- 1995 – 2200 metres
- 1996 – 2225 metres
- 1997 – 2200 metres
- 1998 – 2225 metres
- 1999–2001 – 2200 metres
- 2002 – 2206 metres
- 2003 – 2200 metres
- 2004 – 2240 metres
- 2005 – 2236 metres
- 2006–2014 – 2200 metres
- 2015 – 2400 metres
- 2016–2018 – 2200 metres
- 2019 – 3000 metres
- 2020 onwards – 2400 metres

== Winners ==
The following are past winners of the race:

- 2026 - Asterix
- 2025 - Manzoice
- 2024 - Vow and Declare
- 2023 - Luncies
- 2022 – London Banker
- 2021 – Incentivise
- 2020 – Brimham Rocks
- 2019 – Vow And Declare
- 2018 – Divine Unicorn
- 2017 – Rudy
- 2016 – Index Linked
- 2015 – Escado
- 2014 – The Inventor
- 2013 – Rialya
- 2012 – Ginga Dude
- 2011 – Ironstein
- 2010 – Mirrasalo
- 2009 – Hume
- 2008 – Ballack
- 2007 – Ice Chariot
- 2006 – Ring of Fire
- 2005 – Sky Love
- 2004 – Acetate
- 2003 – Belus
- 2002 – Captain Test
- 2001 – Spirit of Westbury
- 2000 – Brave Prince
- 1999 – Reputed Groom
- 1998 – Luther
- 1997 – Sapio
- 1996 – Sonata
- 1995 – Czar Oak
- 1994 – Oompala
- 1993 – Ancient Ritual
- 1992 – Donegal Mist
- 1991 – Greenback
- 1990 – Eye of the Sky
- 1989 – Jondolar
- 1988 – Plume D'Or Veille
- 1987 – Kensei
- 1986 – Dinky Flyer
- 1985 – Rushcutter
- 1984 – Rock Show
- 1983 – Prince Majestic
- 1982 – Coe
- 1981 – El Laurena
- 1980 – Golden Rhapsody
- 1979 – Big Skipper
- 1978 – Future Shock
- 1977 – Wolf City
- 1976 – Authentic Heir
- 1975 – Purple Patch
- 1974 – Gay Master
- 1973 – The Developer
- 1972 – Buon Giorno
- 1971 – Planet Kingdom
- 1970 – Gypsy Moss
- 1969 – Bright Shadow
- 1968 – Swift Peter
- 1967 – Winfreux
- 1966 – Winfreux
- 1965 – Ampass
- 1964 – Pharmacy
- 1963 – River Seine
- 1962 – Dhaulagiri
- 1961 – High Society
- 1960 – Dow Street
- 1959 – Earlwood
- 1958 – Cool Gent
- 1957 – Cool Gent
- 1956 – Cambridge
- 1955 – Milwaukee
- 1954 – Euphrates
- 1953 – Callide River
- 1952 – Gay Felt
- 1951 – Rinkeno
- 1950 – Highway
- 1949 – Battle Abbey
- 1948 – Rio Fe
- 1947 – Bon Vite
- 1946 – Noble Hero
- 1945 – Repshot
- 1944 – Bahford
- 1943 – Wiseland
- 1942 – race not held
- 1941 – Abspear
- 1940 – Millie's Hope
- 1939 – Seven Fifty
- 1938 – Hastate
- 1937 – Brownfelt
- 1936 – Spear Prince
- 1935 – Regal Star
- 1934 – Brown Force
- 1933 – Herolage
- 1932 – Lough Neagh
- 1931 – Lady Linden
- 1930 – race not held
- 1929 – Moorelin
- 1928 – Marella
- 1927 – Nonchalance
- 1926 – Strongbow
- 1925 – Lady Shepherd
- 1924 – Serelot

== See also ==
- W J Healy Stakes
- Tattersall's Tiara
- List of Australian Group races
- Group races
