= 2001 Melbourne Cup =

Australian horse race

- Melbourne Cup
- Location: Flemington Racecourse; Melbourne, Australia
- Date: 6 November 2001
- Winning horse: Ethereal
- Jockey: Scott Seamer
- Trainer: Sheila Laxon
- Surface: Grass
- Attendance: 92,477

300 left to go, Give The Slip over on the inside the leader, from Persian Punch here comes Ethereal down the outside followed by Karasi and then Maythehorsebewithu. Give The Slip well clear at the 200 meter mark though down the outside is Ethereal starting to close. Give The Slip with Ethereal coming home. Give The Slip in front Ethereal's coming hard, the Caulfield Cup winner's grabbed the lead and Ethereal does the double!

— Commentator Greg Miles describes the climax of the race

The 2001 Melbourne Cup was the 141st running of the Melbourne Cup, a prestigious Australian Thoroughbred horse race. The race, run over 3,200 metres (1.988 mi), was held on 6 November 2001 at Melbourne's Flemington Racecourse.

It was won by Ethereal, trained by Sheila Laxon and ridden by Scott Seamer.

== Field ==
This is the finishing order of horses which ran in the 2001 Melbourne Cup.

Place	Number	Horse	Trainer	Jockey
1st	13	Ethereal (NZ)	Sheila Laxon (NZ)	Scott Seamer
2nd	5	Give The Slip (GB)	Saeed bin Suroor (UAE)	Richard Hills
3rd	1	Persian Punch (IRE)	David Elsworth (GB)	Richard Quinn
4th	18	Karasi (GB)	David Hall	Glen Boss
5th	19	Maythehorsebewithu (NZ)	Michael Moroney (NZ)	Jason Patton
6th	22	Rain Gauge	George Hanlon	Kerrin McEvoy
7th	6	Marienbard (IRE)	Saeed bin Suroor (UAE)	Frankie Dettori
8th	2	Sky Heights (NZ)	Colin Alderson	Damien Oliver
9th	17	Reenact	Jack Denham	Larry Cassidy
10th	20	Prophet's Kiss	Ron Quinton	Brian York
11th	15	Inaflury (NZ)	Cliff Brown	Brett Prebble
12th	11	Mr Prudent	George Hanlon	Craig Williams
13th	4	Caitano (GB)	Andreas Schutz (GER)	Johnny Murtagh
14th	24	Celestial Show	L. Morton	Rhys McLeod
15th	23	Rum	Dean Lawson	Chris Munce
16th	9	Freemason	John Hawkes	Darren Gauci
17th	21	Spirit Of Westbury (NZ)	Cliff Brown	Shane Dye
18th	8	Yippyio	Allan Denham	Darren Beadman
19th	16	Big Pat	Peter Tulloch	Peter Mertens
Last	12	Pasta Express	Paul Cave	Danny Nikolic
DNF	10	Curata Storm	John Hawkes	Greg Childs
LR	14	Hill Of Grace (NZ)	Robert Priscott (NZ)	Corey Brown
SCR	~~3~~	~~Universal Prince~~	~~Bede Murray~~	
SCR	~~7~~	~~Kaapstad Way (NZ)~~	~~Chris Wood (NZ)~~	
