= Without a Fight (horse) =

Irish bred thoroughbred racehorse

Without A Fight
- Racing Silks of Sheikh Mohammed Obaid al Maktoum
- Sire: Teofilo
- Dam: Khor Sheed
- Damsire: Dubawi
- Sex: Gelding
- Foaled: 29 January 2017
- Colour: Brown
- Owner: Sheikh Mohammed Obaid al Maktoum
- Trainer: Simon & Ed Crisford; Sam & Anthony Freedman
- Jockey: Mark Zahra
- Record: 24: 11-3-5
- Earnings: A$9,741,620

Major wins
- Godolphin Stakes (2021); John Smith's Silver Cup Stakes (2022); Grand Cup (2022); Caulfield Cup (2023); Melbourne Cup (2023)

Awards
- Australian Champion Stayer (2023/24)
- Last updated on 27 December 2025

Without A Fight is a Thoroughbred racehorse. In 2023, he was the winner of the Caulfield Cup and Melbourne Cup double, ridden by Mark Zahra and trained by Sam and Anthony Freedman, becoming the first horse in 22 years to claim the Caulfield cup-Melbourne cup double.

== Racing career ==
Placing	Date	Race	Track	Jockey	1st	2nd	3rd
1st	September 2021	L - Godolphin Stakes	Newmarket Racecourse	Andrea Atzeni	Without a Fight	Fox Tal	John Leeper
1st	June 2022	L - Grand Cup Stakes	York Racecourse	Andrea Atzeni	Without a Fight	John Leeper	Euchen Glen
1st	July 2022	G3 - John Smith's Silver Cup Stakes	York Racecourse	Andrea Atzeni	Without a Fight	John Leeper	Thunderous
1st	May 2023	G3 - Lord Mayor's Cup (BRC)	Eagle Farm	Mark Zahra	Without a Fight	Luncies	Berdibek
1st	October 2023	G1 - Caulfield Cup	Caulfield	Mark Zahra	Without a Fight	West Wind Blows	Gold Trip
1st	November 2023	G1 - Melbourne Cup	Flemington	Mark Zahra	Without a Fight	Soulcombe	Sheraz
3rd	November 2024	G1 - Champions Stakes	Flemington	Mark Zahra	Via Sistina	Atishu	Without a Fight

== See also ==
- List of Melbourne Cup winners
