= Sheila Laxon =

Welsh-born racehorse trainer

Sheila Kathleen Laxon ONZM is a New Zealand/Australian racehorse trainer. Born in Wales, she became the first female Thoroughbred horse trainer to win the Australian cups double, the Caulfield Cup and Melbourne Cup, with mare Ethereal in 2001. In 2024, she won the Melbourne Cup again with Knight's Choice, who was trained with her training partner and husband John Symons.

== Biography ==
Laxon was born in Pontypridd, Glamorgan, Wales. Her early childhood was spent on a small farm run by her mother. Her father was away from home much of the time working as a ship's pilot. It was on the farm that Laxon developed a passion for horses through pony clubs, gymkhanas and showjumping. Prior to moving abroad, she spent time working with English trainer John L. Dunlop at his stables in Arundel, Sussex. At age 18, Laxon moved to Australia, following a friend to the country.

=== Emigration to New Zealand ===
Laxon emigrated to New Zealand in the early 1980s after hitchhiking to the country from Australia. In New Zealand in 1983 she married trainer Laurie Laxon who had a large stable with many successful horses. She rode many of them in trackwork, including Empire Rose who won the 1988 Melbourne Cup. In New Zealand, she competed as an amateur jockey for nearly a decade.

In 1991 she suffered a traumatic brain injury and a broken leg from a fall from a horse during a race in Gisborne. Prior to riding in the race, Laxon recounted that the horse felt "sore" and had been sore throughout his training due to an unknown cause. She described how he should have been scratched on medical grounds, but Laxon changed her mind and decided to ride him anyway, feeling he could win. During the race, her mount fell. She later described the accident, "I knew he was much sorer than when I had ridden him previously...the horse stumbled a couple of times in the race before he fell...I believe that whatever was causing his problem blew apart and he went down without putting his front legs down to break the fall." Laxon was unconscious for eight days and it would take several years for her to fully recover.

=== Racehorse trainer ===
In 1997, Laxon took out her own training license during her recovery. In 2001, Laxon won the Queensland Oaks at Eagle Farm, the Caulfield Cup and the Melbourne Cup with Ethereal. In 2002, Ethereal won the BMW Stakes at Rosehill and ultimately had 21 race starts, winning 8 times and earning $4.76 million in prizemoney. In the 2002 Queen's Birthday and Golden Jubilee Honours, Laxon was appointed an Officer of the New Zealand Order of Merit, for services to racing.

=== Move to Australia ===
After the end of her marriage, in 2002 she moved to Australia. Later that year, she fell while riding and suffered multiple injuries, including a fractured hip, broken ribs, a punctured lung, cracked vertebrae and kidney and liver damage. She did not think she would be able to ride again after the accident. Over the next 14 months she would have four surgeries. In 2004, after she was cleared to ride again, she was reinjured when she fell off a horse trailer when loading horses and broke her elbow. In 2005, she fell off a horse and rebroke ribs she had previously broke in an accident several years earlier.

=== Partnership with Symons ===
In 2006, Laxon joined a formal racing and business partnership with trainer John Symons. Symons and Laxon had been romantically involved since 2003. The couple later married. In 2014, Laxon and Symons were taken to court by several of her racehorse's owners, arguing that horse purchases by Laxon were conducted irregularly, and records were fraudulently submitted, preventing the horses from being raced or trialed. The Supreme Court ruled against Laxon and Symons for their conduct and issued the couple a fine as well as expenses from the litigating party. It was reported that Laxon and Symons were fined over $1m. After the judgement, Laxon and Symons sold their training facility to Jamie Coman and left Victoria.

=== Move to Queensland ===
Laxon and Symons later moved to the Sunshine Coast in Queensland and where they considered retiring from racing. After changing their minds, in 2016, Laxon applied for a training license in Queensland, but was refused on the basis that she had not upheld the terms of the previous judgement against her, and that she was bankrupt. After an internal review and appeal, Laxon was granted a training license.

The pair then returned to racing. Their biggest success came in 2024, when they trained Knight's Choice to win the 2024 Melbourne Cup. Another of her runners for the Melbourne Cup was scratched by race veterinarians on medical grounds, which Laxon criticized arguing the horse was sound. After prize money from Knight's Choice's race went missing, Laxon and Symons launched a claim against Racing Victoria. It was found that Laxon and Symons had not updated the bank account on file with Racing Victoria, and the proceeds from the winnings were deposited into an account that the couple no longer used. In the resulting suit, the couple was accused of owing $500,000 unpaid debts from the 2014 litigation and ruling against them. The couple denied owing the debt. As of 2025, the funds are still missing.

=== Views on racing's future ===
Laxon has been public about her frustration with the future of thoroughbred racing in Australia, especially concerning the emergence of increased welfare regulations in racing, and the decreased involvement of young people in the industry. When asked about what she would change in the racing industry, she said,

"I loved what racing was like 20 years ago and I don’t like what is happening now with new welfare rules and all that. It’s getting too scientific. Horses were kicked out of the Melbourne Cup this year... I think that’s getting too pedantic. If they had those rules when Empire Rose and Ethereal were running, we might have been kicked out...Empire Rose ran in four Melbourne Cups. I’m not saying they would have found something but it’s more likely and I think that is sad for the future trainers who have to contend with all those things...It’s sad, as I see it, that the sport is getting too precious..."

== See also ==
- Gai Waterhouse, second woman to train a Melbourne Cup winner
