= Jye McNeil =

Australian jockey

Personal information
- Nationality: Australian
- Born: 1994 (age 31–32)
- Occupation: Jockey
- Weight: 50 kg (110 lb)

Horse racing career
- Sport: Horse racing
- Career wins: 1,214

Major racing wins
- Australian Cup; Melbourne Cup; Toorak Handicap; Turnbull Stakes

Significant horses
- Twilight Payment

Jye McNeil (born 1994) is an Australian jockey based in Victoria. His race victories include the 2020 Melbourne Cup.

McNeil grew up with his family in the small Victorian town of Koondrook on the Murray River. He began his riding career in 2011. As of mid-October 2026, he has ridden 1,214 winners, including four in Group One races.

McNeil's first Group One victory was on Kings Will Dream in the 2019 Turnbull Stakes. He won the 2020 Melbourne Cup on Twilight Payment after leading throughout the race.

He and his wife, fellow jockey Jessica Payne, have a son, born in 2020.

== Major wins ==
Australia

- Australian Cup - (1) - Homesman (2021)
- Melbourne Cup - (1) - Twilight Payment (2020)
- Toorak Handicap - (1) - I'm Thunderstruck (2021)
- Turnbull Stakes - (1) - Kings Will Dream (2019)
