= Ethereal (horse) =

New Zealand-bred Thoroughbred racehorse

- Sire: Rhythm (USA)
- Grandsire: Mr. Prospector
- Dam: Romanee Conti
- Damsire: Sir Tristram
- Sex: Mare
- Foaled: 16 November 1997
- Country: New Zealand
- Colour: Bay
- Breeder: Sir Peter James Vela & Phillip Malcolm Vela
- Owner: Sir Peter James Vela & Phillip Malcolm Vela
- Trainer: Sheila Laxon
- Record: 21: 8-1-3
- Earnings: A$4,762,135

Major wins
- Doomben Roses (2001); Queensland Oaks (2001); Caulfield Cup (2001); Melbourne Cup (2001); The BMW Stakes (2002)

Awards
- Waikato Horse of the Year Award (2002); Australian Champion Stayer (2002)

Honours
- New Zealand Racing Hall of Fame
- Last updated on 8 September 2007

Ethereal (foaled 16 November 1997) is a New Zealand thoroughbred racehorse. The mare is best known for winning the 2001 Melbourne Cup.

== Background ==
Ethereal is a bay mare owned and bred by brothers Peter and Phillip Vela, who own Pencarrow Stud and New Zealand Bloodstock. Ethereal was sired by the 1989 U.S. Champion 2-Yr-Old Colt and Breeders' Cup Juvenile winner, Rhythm (USA). Her grandsire was the very influential Champion sire Mr. Prospector. Her dam was Romanee Conti, a Hong Kong Cup winner and a daughter of leading sire Sir Tristram (IRE). Ethereal was trained during her racing career by Sheila Laxon.

== Racing career ==
Ethereal won four Group One races, including three of the most important staying races in Australia, the Caulfield and Melbourne Cups in 2001 and The BMW Stakes in 2002. An international campaign was considered to possibly include the Arc de Triomphe, but was abandoned due to the tough racing she had endured the previous season.

She was named Australian Champion Stayer, but was beaten to the title of New Zealand & Australian Horse of the Year by the champion mare Sunline.

== Stud record ==
Immediately following her win in the 2002 BMW Stakes, Ethereal was retired from racing to serve as a broodmare for her owner's Pencarrow Stud at Hamilton, New Zealand.

At stud, Ethereal has produced a Giant's Causeway filly named Uberalles who was third in the Group 2 Great Northern Guineas and was third in the Group 1 New Zealand Derby. In 2007 Ethereal's colt by Stravinsky, sold for NZ$1,300,000 at the Karaka Premier sale in 2007.

== See also ==
- Thoroughbred racing in New Zealand
- Thoroughbred racing in Australia
