= Ciaron Maher =

Australian horse trainer

Personal information
- Born: 27 May 1981 (age 45)
- Occupation: Horse trainer
- Website: https://www.ciaronmaher.com.au

Horse racing career
- Sport: Horse racing
- Career winnings: $126,743,228 (Note: As of 1 November 2022.)
- Career wins: 30 Group 1 wins 1693 career wins

Major racing wins
- 2022 Melbourne Cup - Gold Trip - 2026 Melbourne Cup

Ciaron Maher (born 27 May 1981) is an Australian Melbourne Cup-winning horse trainer. He grew up on his parents' dairy farm situated at Winslow, a town near Warrnambool, where he spent time around horses from a young age. For a few years, Maher rode as a jockey until the age of 23 when he was forced to quit riding due to his growing weight.

In 2026, he became the first trainer in history to win a Melbourne Cup trifecta, with his horses Point Of Law, Zahraan and Juja Kibo coming in first, second and third.

== Suspension from racing ==
From the 9 October 2017, Maher was suspended from racing for 6 months and fined $75,000 after pleading guilty to "conduct prejudicial to the image, interests or welfare of racing". Racing stewards alleged that Maher failed to report suspicions he had regarding conman Peter Foster's ownership of horses Azkadellia, Hart, Loveable Rogue and Mr Simples.

== Group 1 winners ==
Maher has achieved over 30 group one wins which include:

Race	Horse	Year
A J Moir Stakes	Coolangatta	2022
Australian Derby	Explosive Jack	2021
Australian Derby	Hitotsu	2022
Australian Guineas	Hitotsu	2022
Caulfield Cup	Jameka	2016
Caulfield Cup	Duke De Sessa	2024
Coolmore Classic	Lighthouse	2022
Doomben 10,000	Bella Nipotina	2024
Doomben Cup	Kenedna	2019
Empire Rose Stakes	Pride Of Jenni	2023
Empire Rose Stakes	Pride Of Jenni	2025
The Everest	Bella Nipotina	2024
The Goodwood	Royal Merchant	2023
H E Tancred Stakes	Sir Dragonet	2021
Kennedy Champions Mile	Pride Of Jenni	2023
Memsie Stakes	Snapdancer	2022
Manikato Stakes	Loving Gaby	2019
Manikato Stakes	Bella Nipotina	2022
Melbourne Cup	Gold Trip	2022
Oakleigh Plate	Marabi	2022
Queen Elizabeth Stakes (ATC)	Pride Of Jenni	2024
Queen of the Turf Stakes	Kenedna	2019
Queensland Oaks	Socks Nation	2024
Queensland Oaks	Fireball Miss	2026
Robert Sangster Stakes	Snapdancer	2022
South Australian Derby	Explosive Jack	2021
Sydney Cup	Etah James	2020
Sydney Cup	Explosive Jack	2023
Tattersall's Tiara	Bella Nipotina	2024
Turnbull Stakes	Smokin' Romans	2022
Turnbull Stakes	Gold Trip	2023
Victoria Derby	Hitotsu	2021
Victoria Derby	Observer	2025
W. S. Cox Plate	Sir Dragonet	2020
William Reid Stakes	Loving Gaby	2020
Manikato Stakes	Southport Tycoon	2024
Melbourne Cup	Point Of Law	2026
