= Gold Trip =

French bred thoroughbred racehorse

- Racing Silks of Jean-Louis Bouchard & Australian Bloodstock
- Sire: Outstrip
- Grandsire: Exceed And Excel
- Dam: Sarvana
- Damsire: Dubai Destination
- Sex: Colt
- Foaled: 10 March 2017
- Country: France
- Colour: Bay
- Breeder: Michael Monfort
- Owner: 1. Jean-Louis Bouchard (2019-2021); 2. Australian Bloodstock, J. Woodbridge, Whitegate Pastoral & Roth Brogan Syndicate (2022– )
- Trainer: Fabrice Chappet (2019-2021); Ciaron Maher & David Eustace (2022-2023); Ciaron Maher (2024 onwards)
- Jockey: Mark Zahra
- Record: 26: 3-5-6
- Earnings: A$7,369,739

Major wins
- Prix Greffulhe (2020); Melbourne Cup (2022); Turnbull Stakes (2023)

Awards
- Australian Champion Stayer (2022/23)
- Last updated on 7 October 2023

Gold Trip (foaled 10 March 2017) is a multiple Group 1 winning French-bred Thoroughbred racehorse that is most notable for winning the 2022 Melbourne Cup.

== Background ==
Gold Trip is out of the Aga Khan mare Sarvana, who was unplaced in one minor race. Bred by Michael Monfort, he was sold as a yearling for €60,000 at the 2018 Arqana August Yearling Sale in Deauville, France.

== Racing career ==
Originally trained in France by Fabrice Chappet, Gold Trip was beaten a head at his racing debut at Deauville on October 24, 2019. His only win in France was in the Group II Prix Greffulhe in 2020. He also ran 3rd in the Group I Grand Prix de Paris behind Mogul and 4th in the Prix de l'Arc de Triomphe behind Sottsass. In 2021, Gold Trip placed in the Prix Ganay and the Grand Prix de Saint-Cloud before being sold to Australian Bloodstock syndicators to race in Australia for a reported purchase price of A$2.3 million. In Australia, Gold Trip ran placings in the Naturalism Stakes and Caulfield Cup before winning the 2022 Melbourne Cup by a margin of 2 lengths at the odds of 20/1.

== Pedigree ==
Pedigree of Gold Trip (FR) 2017
Sire Outstrip (GB) 2011	Exceed And Excel (AUS); 2000	Danehill	Danzig
Sire Outstrip (GB) 2011	Exceed And Excel (AUS); 2000	Danehill	Razyana
Sire Outstrip (GB) 2011	Exceed And Excel (AUS); 2000	Patrona	Lomond
Sire Outstrip (GB) 2011	Exceed And Excel (AUS); 2000	Patrona	Gladiolus
Sire Outstrip (GB) 2011	Asi Siempre (USA); 2002	El Prado	Sadler's Wells
Sire Outstrip (GB) 2011	Asi Siempre (USA); 2002	El Prado	Lady Capulet
Sire Outstrip (GB) 2011	Asi Siempre (USA); 2002	Siempre Asi	Silver Hawk
Sire Outstrip (GB) 2011	Asi Siempre (USA); 2002	Siempre Asi	Turkish Treasure
Dam Sarvana (FR) 2010	Dubai Destination (USA); 1999	Kingmambo	Mr. Prospector
Dam Sarvana (FR) 2010	Dubai Destination (USA); 1999	Kingmambo	Miesque
Dam Sarvana (FR) 2010	Dubai Destination (USA); 1999	Mysterial	Alleged
Dam Sarvana (FR) 2010	Dubai Destination (USA); 1999	Mysterial	Mysteries
Dam Sarvana (FR) 2010	Sarlisa (FR); 2002	Rainbow Quest	Blushing Groom
Dam Sarvana (FR) 2010	Sarlisa (FR); 2002	Rainbow Quest	I Will Follow
Dam Sarvana (FR) 2010	Sarlisa (FR); 2002	Sarliya	Doyoun
Dam Sarvana (FR) 2010	Sarlisa (FR); 2002	Sarliya	Safita

== See also ==
- List of Melbourne Cup winners
