= Mark Zahra =

Australian jockey

Personal information
- Nationality: Australian
- Born: 27 June 1982 (age 44)
- Occupation: Jockey
- Height: 172 cm (5 ft 8 in)
- Weight: 52 kg (115 lb)

Horse racing career
- Sport: Horse racing
- Career wins: 1514

Major racing wins
- Caulfield Guineas; Melbourne Cup; Caulfield Cup

Significant horses
- Without A Fight; Gold Trip; Verry Elleegant

Mark Zahra (born 27 June 1982) is an Australian jockey who is notable for having won the Melbourne Cup on Without A Fight in 2023 and on Gold Trip in 2022, as well as the Caulfield Cup on Without A Fight in 2023 and on Verry Elleegant in 2020. He is the ninth jockey to ride consecutive Melbourne Cup winners.

== Racing career ==
Zahra started his racing career in Western Australia and started his apprenticeship with Dean White. His first raceday ride was on Wail Spring on Boxing Day 1998 at Geraldton Racecourse. He won his first race at the same track on 1 March 1999 on Winrosy. He then moved to Victoria to work for Brian Cox at Wodonga and later with Tony McEvoy at Lindsay Park.

In August 2010, Zahra was found guilty of reckless riding and suspended for 29 meetings after an incident in a race that caused a serious spinal injury to jockey Danny Brereton, who fell from Marquee Player in the Mitchell Mackenzie stakes at Moonee Valley. Brereton is still disabled as a result, and is only able to walk with the assistance of a walking aid.

Zahra's first Group One victory was in the 2006 Doomben Cup on Above Deck, trained by Jim Conlan. On the opening day of the 2025 Melbourne Cup Carnival, he rode the winners of four consecutive races: two Group Two races, followed by the Group One races the Coolmore Stud Stakes and the Victoria Derby. At the end of that day's racing, he had ridden 1,476 winners, including 38 in Group 1 races.

== Major wins ==
=== International wins ===
- 2004 Raffles Cup in Singapore on Mayo's Music
- 2022 Singapore Gold Cup in Singapore on Hong Kong Great
- 2025 Queen Anne Stakes in England on Docklands

=== Australian wins ===
- 2006 Doomben Cup on Above Deck
- 2008 T J Smith Stakes on Rockdale
- 2017 Coolmore Stud Stakes on Merchant Navy
- 2018 Australian Derby on Levendi
- 2018 VRC Sprint Classic on Santa Ana Lane
- 2019 Caulfield Guineas on Super Seth
- 2019 T J Smith Stakes on Santa Ana Lane
- 2019 Zipping Classic on Southern France
- 2020 Turnbull Stakes on Verry Elleegant
- 2020 Caulfield Cup on Verry Elleegant
- 2022 C F Orr Stakes on Tofane
- 2022 South Australian Derby on Jungle Magnate
- 2022 Melbourne Cup on Gold Trip
- 2023 Turnbull Stakes on Gold Trip
- 2023 Caulfield Cup on Without A Fight
- 2023 Melbourne Cup on Without A Fight
- 2024 Australian Oaks on Autumn Angel
- 2024 Australasian Oaks on Vibrant Sun
- 2025 Coolmore Stud Stakes on Tentyris
- 2025 Victoria Derby on Observer
- 2025 Champions Sprint (VRC) on Giga Kick
- 2025 Australasian Oaks on Benagil
