= Pentire =

British Thoroughbred racehorse

- Sire: Be My Guest
- Grandsire: Northern Dancer
- Dam: Gull Nook
- Damsire: Mill Reef
- Sex: Stallion
- Foaled: 12 April 1992
- Died: 20 November 2017 (aged 25)
- Country: United States
- Colour: Bay
- Breeder: Lord Halifax
- Owner: 1) Mollers Racing; 2) Shadai Farm
- Trainer: Geoff Wragg
- Record: 18: 8-2-4
- Earnings: £911,037

Major wins
- Sandown Classic Trial (1995); Dee Stakes (1995); Predominate Stakes (1995); King Edward VII Stakes (1995); Great Voltigeur Stakes (1995); Irish Champion Stakes (1995); King George VI and Queen Elizabeth Stakes (1996)

Awards
- Timeform rating: 132

Pentire (12 April 1992 – 20 November 2017) was a British Thoroughbred racehorse and sire.

== Background ==
Pentire was bred by Lord Halifax, he was purchased for 54,000 guineas by Mollers Racing, the racing stable Trust of brothers Eric and Budgie Moller.

== Racing career ==
Trained by Geoff Wragg, at age two Pentire's best result in a conditions race was a third in the Richmond Stakes. At age three in 1995, the colt had an outstanding year that included twice beating the brilliant runner, Singspiel. Pentire made seven starts, winning six and earning a strong second to Lammtarra in Britain's most prestigious all-age race, the Group one King George VI and Queen Elizabeth Diamond Stakes. In 1996, Pentire came back to a dominating win in the King George VI and Queen Elizabeth Diamond Stakes and earned a Timeform rating of 132 for the second straight year. On 6 October Pentire ran tenth to winner Helissio in the 1996 Prix de l'Arc de Triomphe in Paris and then in what would be his final race, finished eighth to Singspiel in the Japan Cup in Tokyo.

== Stud career ==
Purchased for breeding purposes by Teruya Yoshida, owner of one of Japan's preeminent breeding operations, Shadai Farm, Pentire was retired to stud in 1997 at his owner's farm and also stood that year in New Zealand.

In 2004, he was sent to a breeding operation in Germany. Beginning in 2005, Pentire was the foundation sire at Rich Hill Stud, Walton, New Zealand.

He sired over 300 winners and 25 stakes winners. His most notable progeny include the New Zealand gallopers:

- Chenile: winner of the 2017 Auckland Cup and Karaka Stayers Cup.
- Gagarin: winner of the 2015 Great New Zealand Hurdle
- Mufhasa: 2011 winner of the 2009 and 2011 Telegraph Handicap and Waikato Sprint, 2010 Otaki-Maori Weight for Age, 2011 Makfi Challenge Stakes, Toorak Handicap, Captain Cook Stakes, 2012 Futurity Stakes (MRC) and Windsor Park Plate. New Zealand Horse of the Year in 2009 and 2011.
- Pantani: winner of the 2002 South Australian Derby and 2004 Adelaide Cup.
- Penny Gem: winner of the 2003 Captain Cook Stakes and Counties Cup (Group 2, 2100m, deadheated with Leica Guv). Multiple Group placings including 3rd in the 2003 Queensland Oaks.
- Pentane: winner of the 2006 Auckland Cup.
- Pentathon: winner of the 2006 New Zealand Cup.
- Prince of Penzance: winner of the 2014 Moonee Valley Cup and 2015 Melbourne Cup.
- Xcellent: winner of the 2004 New Zealand Derby, 2005 Kelt Capital Stakes, New Zealand Stakes and Mudgway Stakes. New Zealand Horse of the Year in 2005 and 2006.
- Xtravagant: winner of the 2015 New Zealand 2000 Guineas, 2016 Waikato Sprint and 2016 Cambridge Breeders Stakes (Group 3, 1200m). In 2017 it was retired to stand as a sire at Newhaven Park Stud, New South Wales.

=== Dam sire ===
Pentire is the dam sire of:

- She's A Dealer: (Ace High (Aus) - Say No More), winner of the 2026 New Zealand Thoroughbred Breeders Stakes

== Death ==
On 20 November 2017 Pentire died aged 25 at Rich Hill Stud in Waikato, New Zealand as a result of an internal tumour.

== Pedigree ==
Pedigree of Pentire
Sire Be My Guest	Northern Dancer	Nearctic	Nearco
Sire Be My Guest	Northern Dancer	Nearctic	Lady Angela
Sire Be My Guest	Northern Dancer	Natalma	Native Dancer
Sire Be My Guest	Northern Dancer	Natalma	Almahmoud
Sire Be My Guest	What a Treat	Tudor Minstrel	Owen Tudor
Sire Be My Guest	What a Treat	Tudor Minstrel	Sansonnet
Sire Be My Guest	What a Treat	Rare Treat	Stymie
Sire Be My Guest	What a Treat	Rare Treat	Rare Perfume
Dam Gull Nook	Mill Reef	Never Bend	Nasrullah
Dam Gull Nook	Mill Reef	Never Bend	Lalun
Dam Gull Nook	Mill Reef	Milan Mill	Princequillo
Dam Gull Nook	Mill Reef	Milan Mill	Virginia Water
Dam Gull Nook	Bempton	Blakeney	Hethersett
Dam Gull Nook	Bempton	Blakeney	Windmill Girl
Dam Gull Nook	Bempton	Hardiemma	Hardicanute
Dam Gull Nook	Bempton	Hardiemma	Grand Cross
