= 2011 New Zealand Derby =

The 2011 New Zealand Derby was a horse race which took place at Ellerslie Racecourse on Saturday 5 March 2011. It was the 136th running of the New Zealand Derby, and it was won by Jimmy Choux.

The lead-up to the race was dominated by Jimmy Choux, with the Hawke's Bay colt seeking to become the first horse in more than 20 years to win both the New Zealand 2000 Guineas and the Derby.

Jimmy Choux had an eventful 2010–11 season, winning the Hawke's Bay Guineas, New Zealand 2000 Guineas, Great Northern Guineas, Wellington Stakes and Waikato Guineas to secure hot Derby favouritism. His only defeats were when he was beaten by a nose by Fiddler in the Wanganui Guineas on a very heavy track in his first start of the season, and in the Levin Classic, where he was eased out to finish a long last due to cardiac arrhythmia.

But while there were no arguments over his class, many doubted whether Jimmy Choux could sustain that brilliance and clear superiority over 2400m. His pedigree certainly suggested he would be restricted to races over no more than a mile.

Those doubts were proven unfounded in the most spectacular manner. Jimmy Choux was well back early in the race, then made a sudden and early move on the point of the home turn. He briefly looked vulnerable early in the run home, having already used up his customary turn of foot. Placegetters Historian and On The Level appeared to be rapidly gaining on the favourite. But Jimmy Choux was able to kick again inside the final 100m, drawing away to a comfortable two-length win.

== Race details ==
- Sponsor: Telecom
- Prize money: NZ$2.2 million
- Track: Heavy
- Number of runners: 16
- Winner's time: 2:38.35

== Full result ==
Placing	Margin	Horse	Jockey	Trainer(s)	Odds
1		Jimmy Choux	Jonathan Riddell	John Bary	$2.30
2	2	Historian	Chad Ormsby	Tony Pike & Mark Donoghue	$36.20
3	1¾	On The Level	Michael Coleman	Murray & Bjorn Baker	$22.80
4	4¼	Yin Yang Master	Mark Du Plessis	John Sargent	$39.60
5	1½	Sierra Nevada	Jim Byrne	Richard & Chris Otto	$18.30
6	¾	O'Reilly's Prize	Hayden Tinsley	David Haworth & Matt Dixon	$8.20
7	2½	Yourein	Lisa Allpress	John Sargent	$63.00
8	3¾	Between The Beats	Noel Harris	Jeff Lynds	$52.50
9	1	He's Remarkable	Matthew Cameron	Roger James	$8.80
10	3	Raffles Knight	Leith Innes	Stephen McKee	$40.20
11	3½	Wisecrack	Douglas Whyte	Ken & Bev Kelso	$23.50
12	4	Jetset Lad	Scott Galloway	John Wheeler	$19.60
13	8	Hidden Asset	Vinnie Colgan	Shaune Ritchie	$34.30
14	5	Icepin	Sam Spratt	Jason Bridgman	$14.00
15	½	Encosta Diablo	Opie Bosson	Jason Bridgman	$14.10
16	11	Nippin	Shane Scriven	Allan Sharrock	$24.40

== Winner's details ==
Further details of the winner, Jimmy Choux:

- Foaled: 10 October 2007 in New Zealand
- Sire: Thorn Park; Dam: Cierzo (Centaine)
- Owner: Chouxmaani Investments Ltd
- Trainer: John Bary
- Breeder: Chouxmaani Investments Ltd
- Starts: 16
- Wins: 9
- Seconds: 3
- Thirds: 2
- Earnings: $2,221,550

=== The road to the Derby ===
Early-season appearances in 2010-11 prior to running in the Derby.

- Jimmy Choux – 2nd Wanganui Guineas, 1st Hawke's Bay Guineas, 1st New Zealand 2000 Guineas, 15th Levin Classic, 1st Great Northern Guineas, 1st Wellington Stakes, 1st Waikato Guineas
- Historian – 3rd Waikato Guineas, 4th Avondale Guineas
- On The Level – 4th Waikato Guineas, 2nd Avondale Guineas
- Yin Yang Master – 3rd Great Northern Guineas, 2nd Waikato Guineas, 8th Avondale Guineas
- Sierra Nevada – 3rd Avondale Guineas
- O'Reilly's Prize – 5th Avondale Guineas
- Yourein – 3rd Championship Stakes, 6th Karaka Mile, 13th Avondale Guineas
- He's Remarkable – 6th Hawke's Bay Guineas, 2nd New Zealand 2000 Guineas, 3rd Wellington Stakes, 10th Avondale Guineas
- Raffles Knight – 6th-equal Avondale Guineas
- Jetset Lad – 2nd Wellington Stakes, 6th-equal Avondale Guineas
- Hidden Asset – 1st Championship Stakes, 6th Waikato Guineas, 14th Avondale Guineas
- Icepin - 2nd Hawke's Bay Guineas, 3rd Canterbury Stakes, 10th New Zealand 2000 Guineas, 2nd Great Northern Guineas, 2nd Karaka Mile, 1st Avondale Guineas
- Encosta Diablo - 4th Ray Coupland Stakes, 5th New Zealand 2000 Guineas, 5th Karaka Mile, 9th Avondale Guineas

=== Subsequent Group 1 wins ===
Subsequent wins at Group 1 level by runners in the 2011 New Zealand Derby.

- Jimmy Choux - Rosehill Guineas, Windsor Park Plate, Spring Classic
- Historian - Thorndon Mile, Zabeel Classic

== See also ==
- Recent winners of major NZ 3 year old races
- Desert Gold Stakes
- Hawke's Bay Guineas
- Karaka Million
- Levin Classic
- New Zealand 1000 Guineas
- New Zealand 2000 Guineas
- New Zealand Oaks
