= 2017 New Zealand Derby =

2017 New Zealand horse race

The 2017 New Zealand Derby was a horse race which took place at Ellerslie Racecourse on Saturday 4 March 2017. It was the 142nd running of the New Zealand Derby, and it was won by Gingernuts.

Sold for $5,000 as a weanling and $42,500 as a two-year-old, Gingernuts made a low-key start to his career with two wins in his first five starts – mostly in minor midweek company.

The son of Iffraaj was not even nominated for the Derby until 21 February. But everything changed in the Avondale Guineas, a Group Two race two weeks before the Derby. Gingernuts was a 26-to-one longshot in the $100,000 race and dropped back to a distant last after breaking slowly from the starting gate, but he produced a remarkable finishing burst to win by a length and a quarter.

The Guineas win earned Gingernuts second-favouritism in the Derby, in which he again produced a formidable finish down the home straight to beat the Australian-trained Rising Red by a length. The win sparked huge celebrations among an ownership syndicate of more than 30 people, most wearing matching orange 'G-Nuts' caps.

It was the first New Zealand Derby win for leading New Zealand syndicators Te Akau Racing, as well as for trainers Stephen Autridge and Jamie Richards. Autridge was the favourite to win the race as a jockey in 1981 aboard the undefeated Altitude, who suffered a catastrophic and fatal haemorrhage.

It was the second Derby win for champion jockey Opie Bosson, who won the race in 2015 aboard Mongolian Khan.

== Race details ==
- Sponsor: Vodafone New Zealand
- Prize money: NZ$1,000,000
- Track: Good
- Number of runners: 18
- Winner's time: 2:28.27

== Full result ==
	Margin	Horse	Jockey	Trainer(s)	Odds
1		Gingernuts	Opie Bosson	Stephen Autridge & Jamie Richards	$5.40
2	1	Rising Red	Michael Dee	Trent Busuttin & Natalie Young	$17.50
3	1½	Jon Snow	Matt Cameron	Murray Baker & Andrew Forsman	$29.50
4	½	Beaumarchais	Michael McNab	Stephen Autridge & Jamie Richards	$88.70
5	Nose	Sacred Elixir	Leith Innes	Tony Pike	$5.50
6	1½	Charles Road	Craig Grylls	Lance O'Sullivan & Andrew Scott	$14.90
7	1½	Camino Rocoso	Jason Waddell	Murray Baker & Andrew Forsman	$13.60
8	½	Excalibur	Jonathan Riddell	Shaune Ritchie	$16.70
9	½	Mongolian Legend	Cameron Lammas	Murray Baker & Andrew Forsman	$116.00
10	Nose	Highlad	Johnathan Parkes	Murray Baker & Andrew Forsman	$30.70
11	Neck	Wyndspelle	Danielle Johnson	Donna Logan & Chris Gibbs	$12.90
12	Neck	Savile Row	Michael Coleman	Michael Moroney & Pam Gerard	$3.80
13	½	Leading Role	Lisa Allpress	Gary Vile	$128.60
14	1½	Mongolian Wolf	Mark Du Plessis	Murray Baker & Andrew Forsman	$32.10
15	6	Stephenstihls	Hayden Tinsley	Mike Breslin	$67.90
16	1½	Lincoln Blue	Masa Tanaka	Lisa Latta	$27.60
17	22	Redeem The Dream	Vinnie Colgan	Shaune Ritchie	$39.30
18	½	Cha Siu Bao	Derek Leung	Lance O'Sullivan & Andrew Scott	$40.50

== Winner's details ==
Further details of the winner, Gingernuts:

- Foaled: 2 October 2013 at Goodwood Stud, Palmerston North
- Sire: Iffraaj; Dam: Double Elle (Generous)
- Owner: Te Akau Gingernuts Syndicate (Mgr: DC Ellis)
- Trainer: Stephen Autridge & Jamie Richards
- Breeder: Goodwood Stud
- Starts: 7
- Wins: 4
- Seconds: 1
- Thirds: 0
- Earnings: $671,250

=== The road to the Derby ===
Early-season appearances in 2016-17 prior to running in the Derby.

- Gingernuts – 1st Avondale Guineas
- Jon Snow – 2nd Hawke's Bay Guineas, 8th New Zealand 2000 Guineas, 3rd Great Northern Guineas, 3rd Levin Classic, 3rd Karaka 3YO Mile, 7th Herbie Dyke Stakes
- Beaumarchais – 9th Avondale Guineas
- Sacred Elixir – 1st Caulfield Guineas Prelude, 8th Caulfield Guineas, 1st Moonee Valley Vase, 2nd Victoria Derby, 4th Karaka 3YO Mile, 7th Avondale Guineas
- Charles Road – 2nd Avondale Guineas
- Camino Rocoso – 8th Avondale Guineas
- Excalibur – 5th Trevor Eagle Memorial, 6th Levin Classic, 6th Waikato Guineas
- Highlad – 1st Wanganui Guineas, 3rd UCI Stakes, 9th Caulfield Classic, 8th Victoria Derby, 7th Waikato Guineas, 5th Avondale Guineas
- Wyndspelle – 3rd Northland Breeders' Stakes, 5th Hawke's Bay Guineas, 3rd Sarten Memorial, 5th New Zealand 2000 Guineas, 5th Levin Classic, 1st Waikato Guineas
- Savile Row – 3rd Barneswood Farm Stakes, 2nd New Zealand 2000 Guineas, 2nd Levin Classic, 2nd Herbie Dyke Stakes
- Leading Role – 4th Zacinto Stakes, 9th Levin Classic, 10th Avondale Guineas
- Mongolian Wolf – 10th Northland Breeders' Stakes, 8th Bonecrusher Stakes, 3rd Avondale Guineas
- Stephenstihls – 2nd Zacinto Stakes, 7th Karaka 3YO Mile
- Lincoln Blue – 1st Wellington Stakes, 1st 3YO Salver, 4th Levin Classic, 3rd Waikato Guineas
- Redeem The Dream – 2nd 3YO Salver, 4th Avondale Guineas
- Cha Siu Bao – 4th New Zealand 2000 Guineas, 4th Great Northern Guineas, 4th Waikato Guineas, 6th Avondale Guineas

=== Subsequent Group 1 wins ===
Subsequent wins at Group 1 level by runners in the 2017 New Zealand Derby.

- Gingernuts - Rosehill Guineas, Windsor Park Plate
- Jon Snow - Australian Derby

== See also ==
- Recent winners of major NZ 3 year old races
- Desert Gold Stakes
- Hawke's Bay Guineas
- Karaka Million
- Levin Classic
- New Zealand 1000 Guineas
- New Zealand 2000 Guineas
- New Zealand Oaks
