= Miss Potential =

Australian-bred Thoroughbred racehorse

- Sire: Dolphin Street
- Grandsire: Bluebird
- Dam: Richfield Rose
- Damsire: Crested Wave
- Sex: Mare
- Foaled: 4 October 1998
- Country: Australia
- Colour: Brown
- Breeder: B Borrie
- Owner: A W Borrie
- Trainer: Bill Borrie
- Record: 41: 8-10-3
- Earnings: $1,317,008

Major wins
- Mudgway Stakes (2003); Stoney Bridge Stakes (2004); Nestle Peters Classic (2004)

Miss Potential was a champion mare who raced in New Zealand & Australia in the early 2000s.

She was sired by the 1993 Prix de la Forêt winner Dolphin Street.

Her comeback from a spiral fracture of her near-side cannon bone, resulting in 15 weeks strung up to the ceiling of her box, and subsequent race day performances endeared her to the public.

Miss Potential was generally ridden by Reese Jones in New Zealand. She won eight races and her biggest victories came in the:

- Group 3 Gasmate Stakes (1600m) at Te Rapa in December 2002, beating Hello Dolly and Mary Seaton.
- Group 1 Mudgway Stakes (1340m) at Wanganui in August 2003, beating Tit For Taat and Rosina Lad.
- Group 1 VRC Nestle Classic (1600m) in Melbourne on Derby Day 2004, ridden by Glen Boss, beating Alinghi.
- Group 1 Stoney Bridge Stakes (1600m) at Hastings in September 2005, beating Irish Rover and Magnetism.

She also placed in a number of Group and listed races such as:

- Second in the Group 3 2002 Fayette Park Stakes (1400m) behind Cinder Bella with Elevenses third.
- Second in the Group 2 2002 NRM Auckland Thoroughbred Breeders Stakes behind For Love with Regency third.
- Second in the Group 3 2002 King's Plate behind Able attempt with Hello Dolly third.
- Second in the Group 1 2003 Zabeel Classic behind Hail with Doyle third.
- Second in the Group 2 2003 Glenmorgan Generous Stakes behind Irish Rover with Tit For Taat third.
- Second in the Group 1 2004 Mudgway Partsworld Stakes behind the 2005 World Champion Older Turf Miler, Starcraft, with Kalamata third.
- Second in the Group 2 2004 Stoney Bridge Stakes behind Starcraft again, with Irish Rover third.
- Third in the Listed 2004 Canberra Cup behind So Assertive and Prime Century
- Second in the Group 1 2005 Mudgway Fair Tax For Racing Stakes behind Xcellent with Shinzig third.
- Third in the Group 2 2005 Crystal Mile at Moonee Valley behind Niconero and Cargo Cult.
- Second in the Group 1 2005 Myer Classic at Flemington behind Lotteria.

Trainer Bill Borrie initially retired Miss Potential in 2005, however she returned to racing in 2006 after failing to foal.

== See also ==
- Thoroughbred racing in New Zealand
