= Mufhasa =

New Zealand-bred Thoroughbred racehorse

- Sire: Pentire
- Dam: Sheila Cheval
- Damsire: Mi Preferido
- Sex: Gelding
- Foaled: 7 September 2004
- Country: New Zealand
- Colour: Brown
- Breeder: Colin C E & John W Thompson, Rich Hill Stud
- Owner: David L, Simon C & Natalie N Archer & Mrs Diane J Wright
- Trainer: Stephen McKee
- Record: 62: 20-9-6
- Earnings: $3,629,818.85

Major wins
- Telegraph Handicap (20092011); Waikato Sprint (2009, 2011); Otaki-Maori Weight for Age (2010); Makfi Challenge Stakes (2011); Toorak Handicap (2011); Captain Cook Stakes (2011); Futurity Stakes (2012); Windsor Park Plate (2012)

Honours
- New Zealand Horse of the Year (2009, 2012); New Zealand Racing Hall of Fame (2021)
- Last updated on 7 September 2021

Mufhasa (foaled 7 September 2004), was a New Zealand Thoroughbred racehorse who won a number of Group races in New Zealand and Australia in a career stretching from 2007 to 2013. He was known as King Mufhasa in Australia.

Mufhasa was trained by Stephen McKee and ridden in the majority of his races by Samantha Spratt. Towards the end of his career he was trained by Bruce Wallace and he was cared for throughout his career by strapper Amy Doran.

His win in the 2012 Windsor Park Plate was his tenth and final Group 1 victory.

Mufhasa was voted the New Zealand Horse of the Year for the 2009 and 2012 seasons. In 2021 he was inducted into the New Zealand Racing Hall of Fame.

== Notable performances ==
- 12 November 2008 - 1st in the Coupland's Bakeries Mile (Group 2, 1600m, Riccarton, Samantha Spratt) beating Vosne Romanee and Sterling Prince
- 17 January 2009 - 1st in the Telegraph Handicap (Samantha Spratt) beating Atapi and Ruud Van Slaats
- 7 February 2009 - 1st in the Waikato Sprint (Samantha Spratt) beating Gaze and Ruud Van Slaats
- 28 February 2010 - 1st in the Otaki-Maori Weight for Age (Samatha Spratt) beating Hold It Harvey and Daffodil
- 22 January 2011 - 1st in the Telegraph Handicap (Samantha Spratt) beating First Command and Coup Align
- 12 February 2011 - 1st in the Waikato Sprint (Samantha Spratt) beating Wall Street and Keep The Peace
- 27 August 2011 - 1st in the Makfi Challenge Stakes (Samantha Spratt) beating Jimmy Choux and Fleur de Lune
- 17 September 2011 - 2nd in the Windsor Park Plate (Samantha Spratt) behind Jimmy Choux with Hold It Harvey 3rd
- 8 October 2011 - 1st in the Toorak Handicap (Michael Rodd) beating King's Rose and Luen Yat Forever
- 3 December 2011 - 1st in the Captain Cook Stakes (Samantha Spratt) beating Vonusti and Dating
- 11 February 2012 - 2nd in the Waikato Sprint (Samantha Spratt) behind Veyron with Fazzle 3rd
- 25 February 2012 - 1st in the Futurity Stakes (Nash Rawiller) beating Pinker Pinker
- 22 September 2012 - 1st in the Windsor Park Plate (Samatha Spratt) beating Fleur de Lune and Xanadu
- 6 April 2013 - 2nd in the George Ryder Stakes (Michael Rodd) behind Pierro
- 21 September 2013 - 2nd in the Windsor Park Plate (Leith Innes) behind Xanadu with Nashville 3rd.

== See also ==
- Thoroughbred racing in New Zealand
