= Gingernuts (horse) =

New Zealand-bred Thoroughbred racehorse

- Sire: Iffraaj
- Grandsire: Zafonic
- Dam: Double Elle
- Damsire: Generous
- Sex: Gelding
- Foaled: October 2, 2013
- Country: New Zealand
- Colour: Bay
- Breeder: Goodwood Stud Ltd
- Owner: Te Akau Gingernuts Syndicate
- Trainer: Stephen Autridge & Jamie Richards
- Record: 12: 6–2–0
- Earnings: A$1,225,000

Major wins
- Avondale Guineas (2017); New Zealand Derby (2017); Rosehill Guineas (2017); Windsor Park Plate (2017)

Gingernuts (foaled 2 October 2013) is a retired New Zealand Thoroughbred racehorse. As a three-year-old, he won the 142nd running of the New Zealand Derby, followed up by a win in the Rosehill Guineas in Australia. At age four, he won the Windsor Park Plate and was second in the Livamol Classic, but then was injured while warming up for the Emirates Stakes. The injury required surgery that eventually prompted his retirement.

== Background ==
Gingernuts is a chestnut gelding who was bred by Goodwood Stud in Palmerston North. He was produced by Double Elle, a five-time winning daughter of Generous who descends on the female side from New Zealand Oaks winner Devante. Gingernuts was sired by Iffraaj, a stakes-winning son of Zafonic. He was sold as a weanling for only NZ$5000, then was put through the ring again in the 2015 Ready to Run Sale of two-year-olds. He was bought for NZ$42,500 by Te Akau Racing, a 35-member syndicate consisting of mostly first-time owners. He was trained by Steven Autridge and Jamie Richards.

== Racing career ==
Gingernuts made his debut on 6 May 2016 in a 1200m maiden race at Pukekohe Park, finishing second. He then broke his maiden on 19 May at Hastings over a distance of 1300m.

Gingernuts began his three-year-old campaign on a low-key note, winning one of three starts while competing at rural tracks such as Te Teko. Early in 2017, his trainers added blinkers to his equipment, which helped him focus. On 18 February, he dramatically stepped up in class for the Group II Avondale Guineas at Ellerslie, going off at odds of 26-to-one. Gingernuts missed the start by six lengths and still appeared to have no chance with 600m remaining. However, he and jockey Johnathan Parkes found racing room and "sailed through" to win by a length. The win prompted his connections to make a late nomination payment for the New Zealand Derby.

Gingernuts was the second favourite for the 2017 New Zealand Derby on 4 March. Ridden by Opie Bosson, who had previously won several major races aboard Mongolian Khan, the chestnut gelding surged out of midfield to score a comfortable victory. The win sparked jubilant scenes among the owners, most wearing matching orange caps. "We didn't know where we were before the Avondale Guineas", said Richards. "There's a lot of excited owners here."

Two weeks after his Derby win, Gingernuts crossed the Tasman to make his Australian debut in the Rosehill Guineas at a distance of 2000m. Over extremely heavy going, he settled in mid-pack, then unleashed his run with 800m remaining and struck the lead shortly after turning into the straight. He tired somewhat in the final 100m but was still over three lengths clear of the runner-up, Inference. "He just loves it the further they go and we knew he would handle the conditions," said Richards. "He had his ears pricked all the way up the straight and he was gawking and looking around," noted Bosson. "I was just trying to keep his mind on the job."

He finished his three-year-old campaign with a fifth place finish in the Australian Derby.

Gingernuts returned to New Zealand and was given some time off, then began his four-year-old campaign on 2 September in the Tarzino Trophy, finishing fifth. He next entered the Windsor Park Plate on 23 September, in which his odds dropped rapidly to 2.90 thanks to his ever-growing fanbase. He raced in mid-pack during the early running then followed Kawi to the lead with about 600m remaining. Gingernuts dueled briefly with Kawi before pulling away, then withstood a late charge from Close Up to win by a neck. Two weeks later though, he was caught at the finish line by Wait A Sec in the Livamol Spring Classic, losing by a head.

Gingernuts made his second trip to Australia for the Emirates Stakes on 11 November. Unfortunately, he took a bad step during the warm-up and was immediately pulled up by jockey Michael Dee. The on-track veterinarian immediately applied bandages and the horse was transported to the University of Melbourne veterinary clinic at Werribee. A CT scan found a fracture of the long pastern bone on his near foreleg. He underwent surgery on 13 November, during which four compression screws were inserted into the leg. A small fragment of bone was also removed from the fetlock joint. The initial prognosis was positive according to David Ellis of Te Akau Racing. "The fracture came together well," he said, "and barring any further complications, the prognosis is that he stands a 50/50 chance for a return to racing."

== Retirement ==
On 2 September 2018, his connections announced that Gingernuts was officially retired. Although he recovered well from his injury, veterinarians feared that he would favour the injured leg if he returned to racing. He has been pensioned at Te Akau Stud.

== See also ==
- 2017 New Zealand Derby
- Thoroughbred racing in New Zealand
