= Livamol Classic =

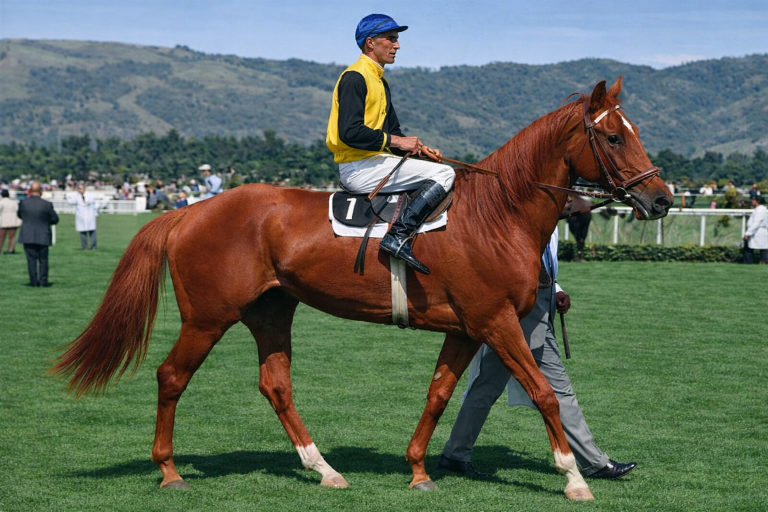
- Redcraze, 1955 winner
- Class: Group I
- Location: Hastings Racecourse; Hawke's Bay, New Zealand
- Inaugurated: 1955
- Race type: Thoroughbred - Flat racing
- Website: Hawke's Bay Racing

Race information
- Distance: 2040m (10 furlongs)
- Surface: Turf
- Track: Left-handed
- Qualification: Three-year-olds and up
- Weight: Weight for Age
- Purse: NZ$550,000 (2026)

The Livamol Classic is a weight-for-age Thoroughbred horse race run at Hastings Racecourse in Hawke's Bay and was at one stage New Zealand's richest horse race. It is run at a distance of 2,040 metres (1.27 mi). The race is run in October. The weather in the Hawke's Bay's means the track conditions are usually excellent.

The race is the part of the Triple Crown raced at Hastings Racecourse, along with:

- the 1,400-metre (0.87 mi) Proisir Plate, which was previously known as the Tarzino Trophy, Makfi Challenge Stakes and Mudgway Stakes, and
- the 1,600-metre (0.99 mi) Howden Insurance Mile (Horlicks Plate) which was previously known as the Windsor Park Plate, Stony Bridge Stakes and Arrowfield Stud Plate.

Many of New Zealand's best thoroughbred horses have raced in the various Triple Crown events. A number of horses managed to win two of the three races and some were beaten into second in the third leg. On 5 October 2019. Melody Belle was the first horse to win all three of the Hawkes Bay Triple Crown races.

== History ==
The race was originally known as the Ormond Memorial and took place on the second day of the autumn carnival until the 1985/86 season when it was moved to the Spring.

From 1991 to 2009 the race was sponsored by Kelt Capital Limited, and in particular the owner thereof Sam Kelt, a strong supporter of New Zealand and particularly Hawke's Bay racing.

1996 would see it gain Group 1 status and the distance changed from 2000m to 2040m.

The growth in prize money was substantial in the decade up to 2008. In 2000 it was worth $250,000; in 2002 it was the equal richest race in New Zealand at $500,000 and in 2004 it was New Zealand's first million-dollar race. The race was worth $2,000,000 in 2007 and 2008, but the stake had to be reduced to $1,200,000 in 2009 as that level was deemed unsustainable. In 2010 the stake was reduced to $250,000, below several major races in New Zealand but still slightly ahead in terms of weight-for-age races.

In 2010, after the cessation of the Kelt sponsorship, the Ormond Memorial name was modified in recognition of Lady Katherine (Kit) Acklin née Ormond who had recently died.

=== 1960 racebook ===
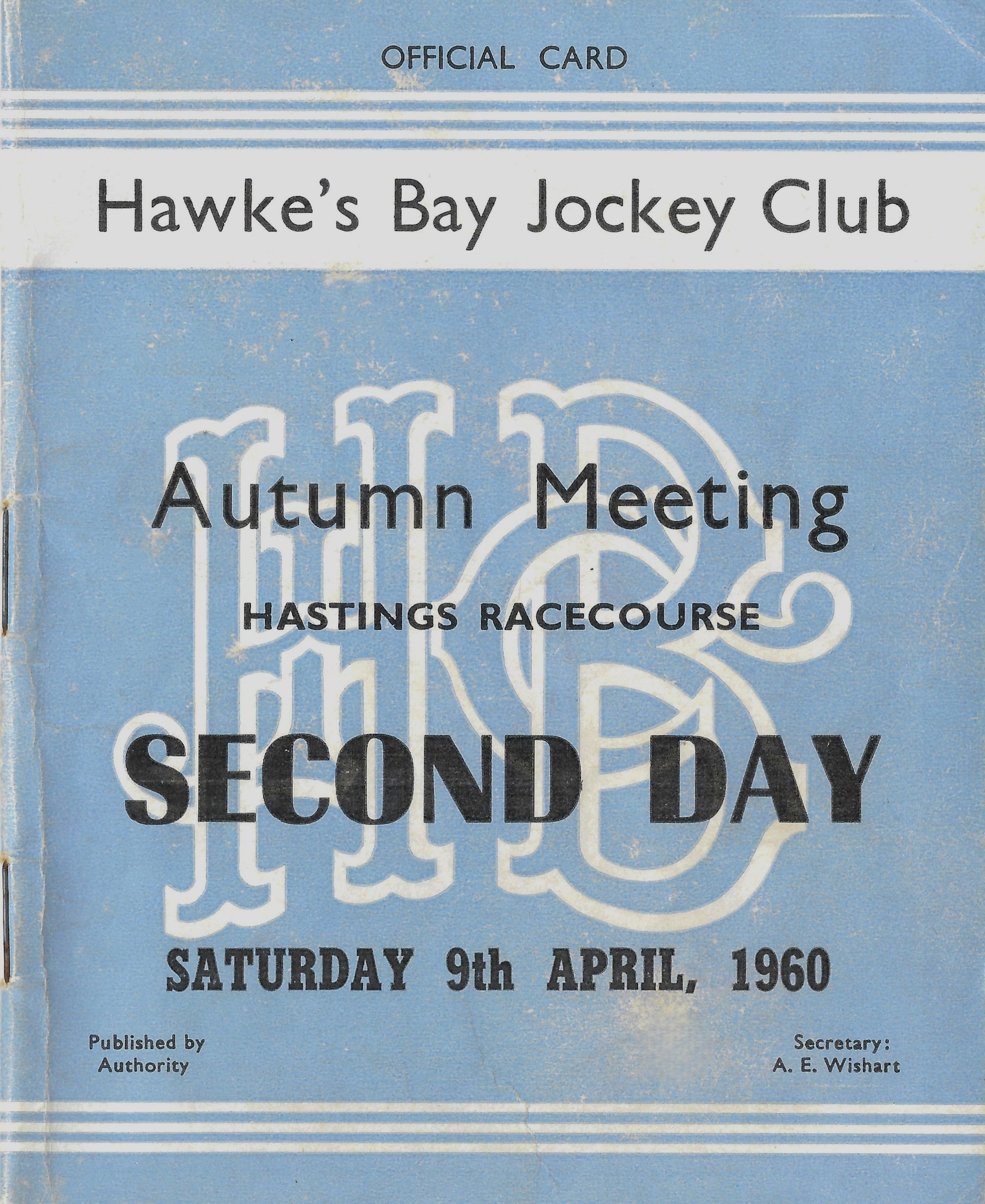
1960 HBJC Ormond Memorial Gold Cup racebook front cover

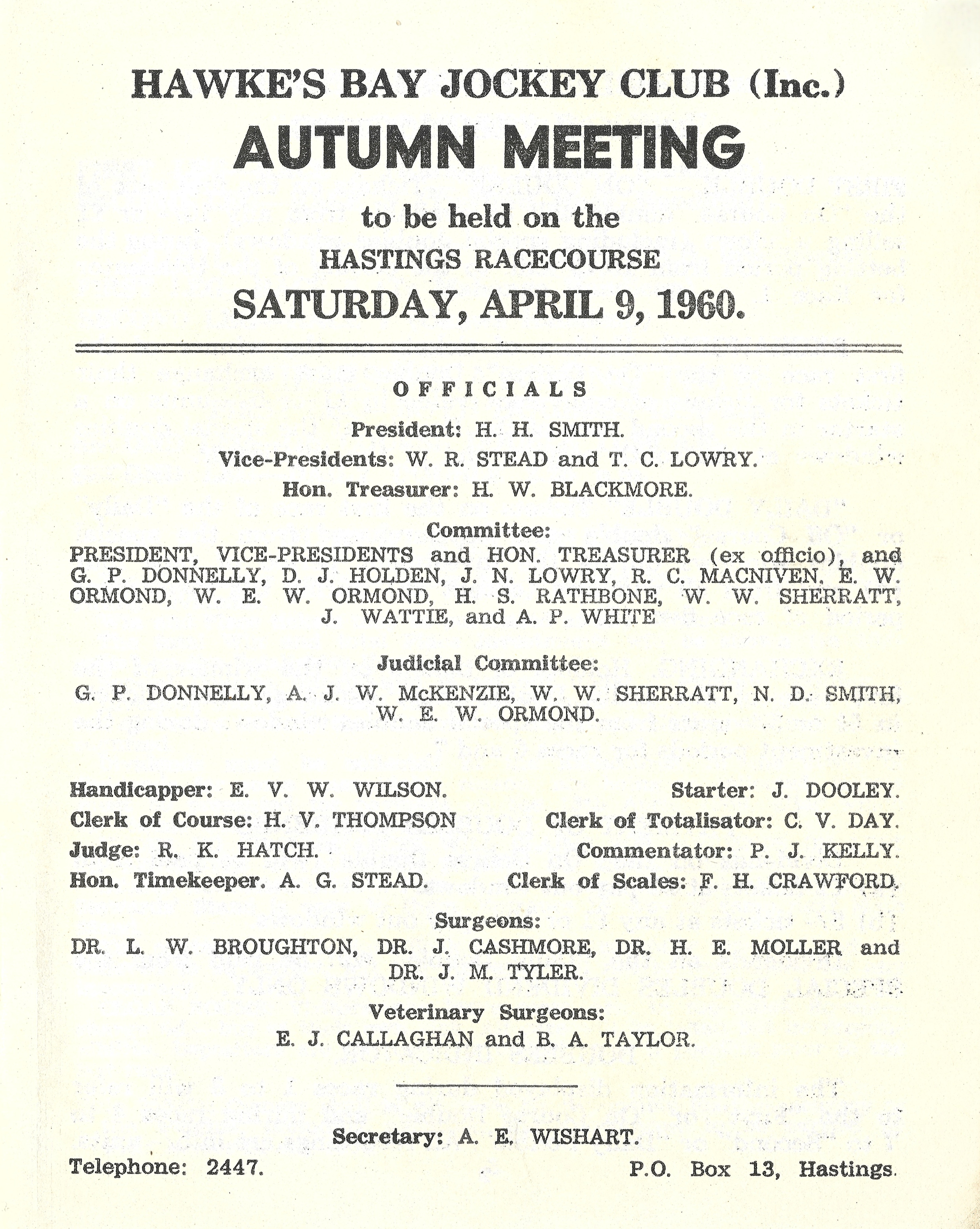
1960 HBJC Ormond Memorial Gold Cup raceday officials

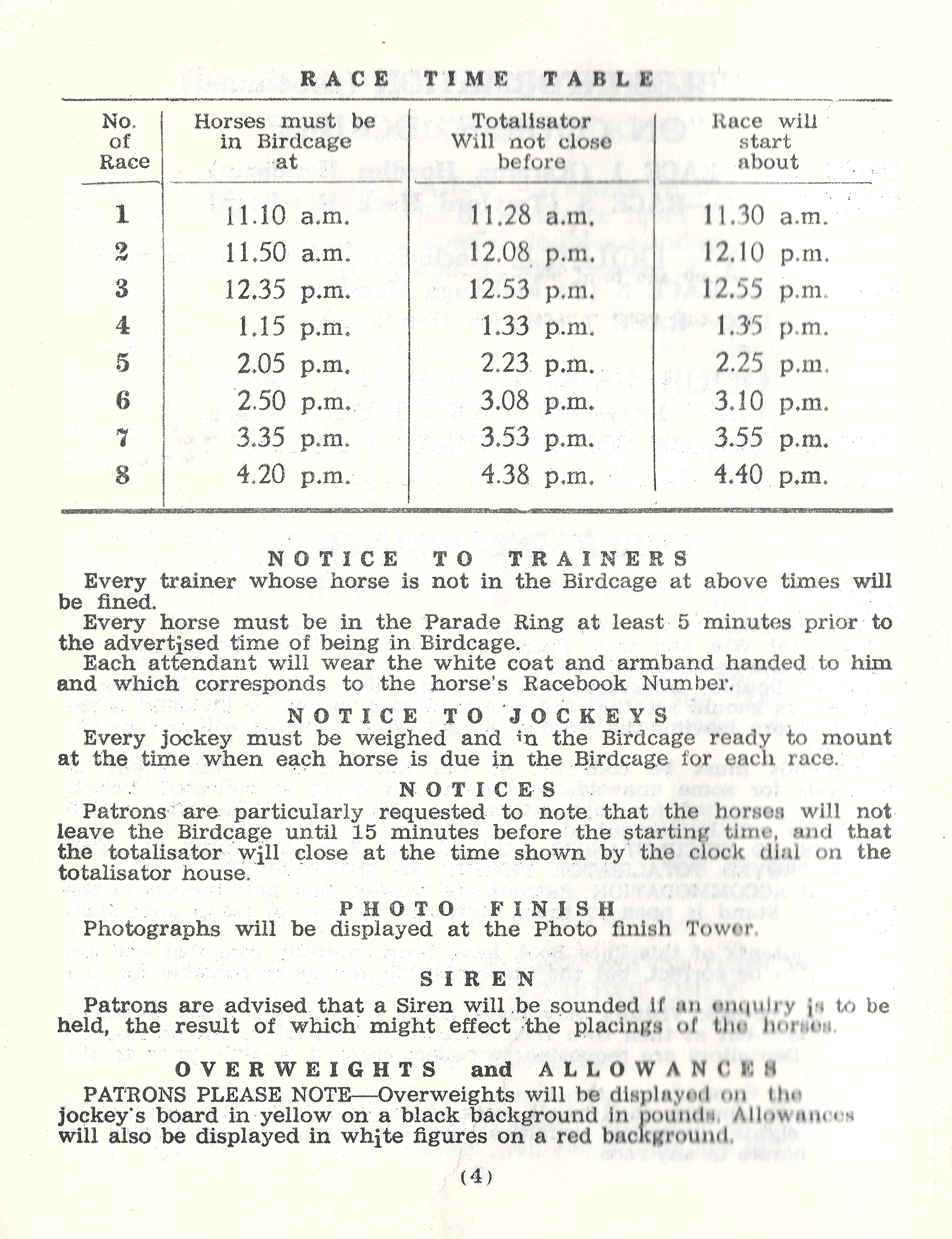
1960 HBJC Ormond Memorial Gold Cup race times and notices

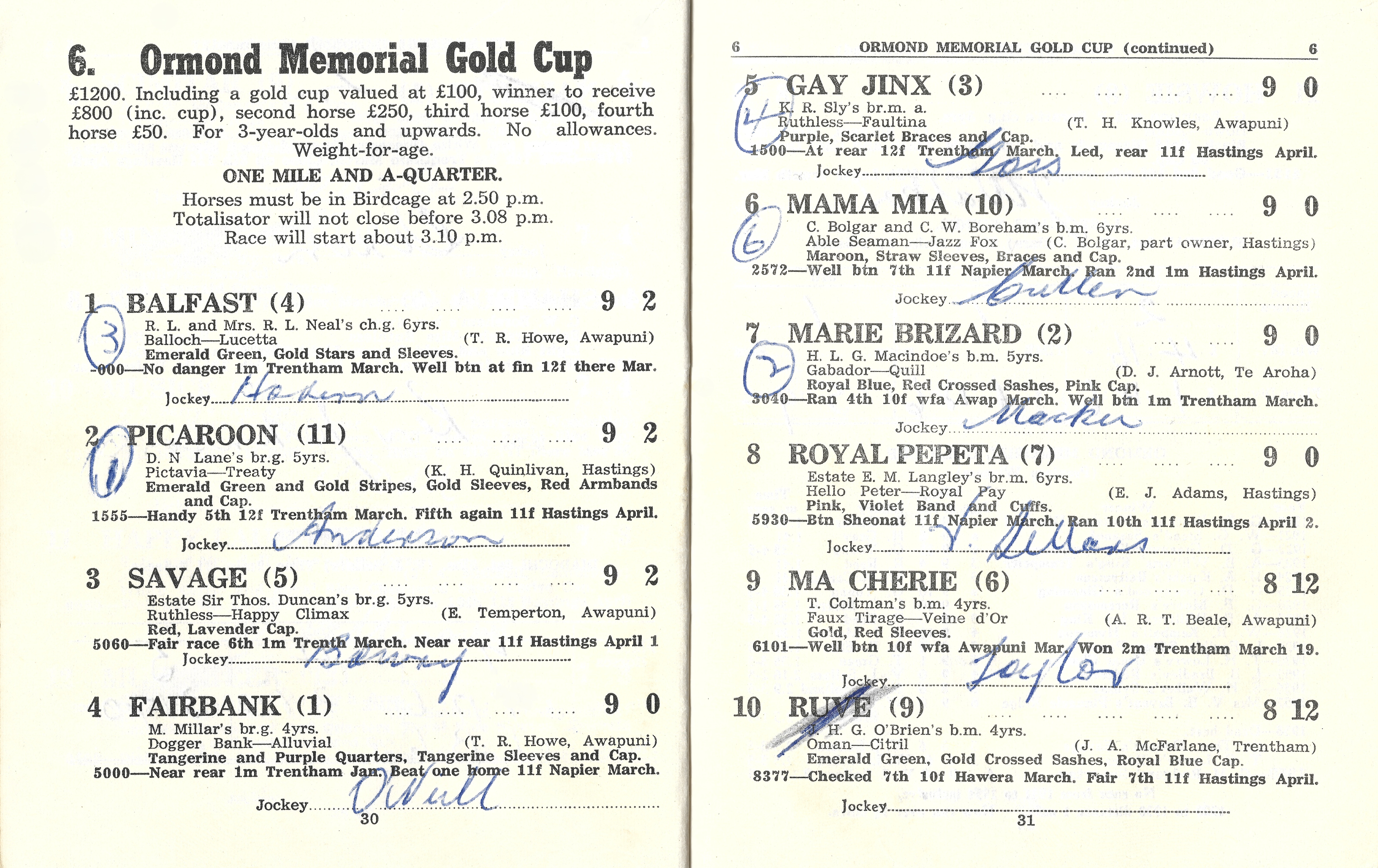
1960 HBJC Ormond Memorial Gold Cup showing the winner, Picaroon

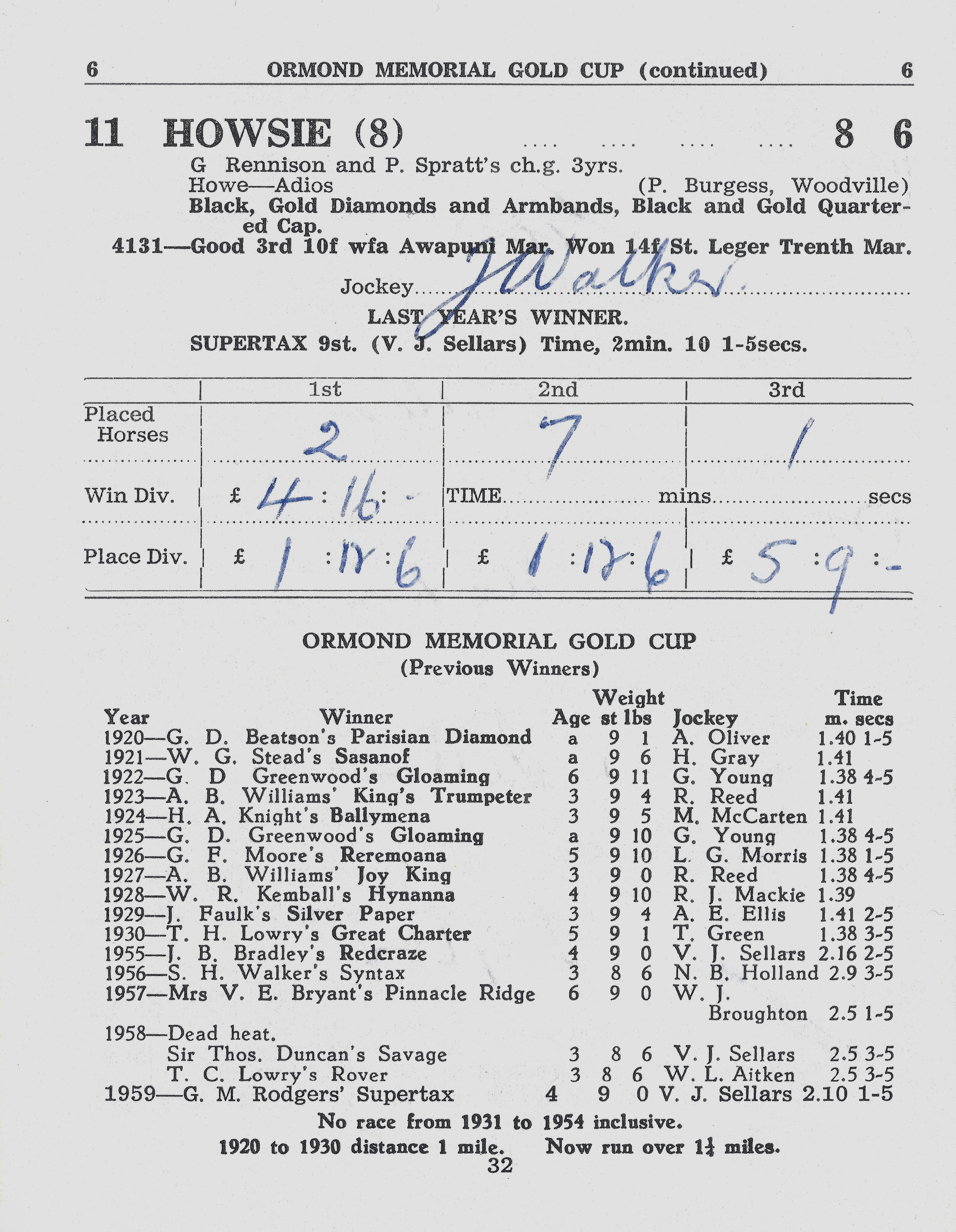
1960 HBJC Ormond Memorial Gold Cup starters and results

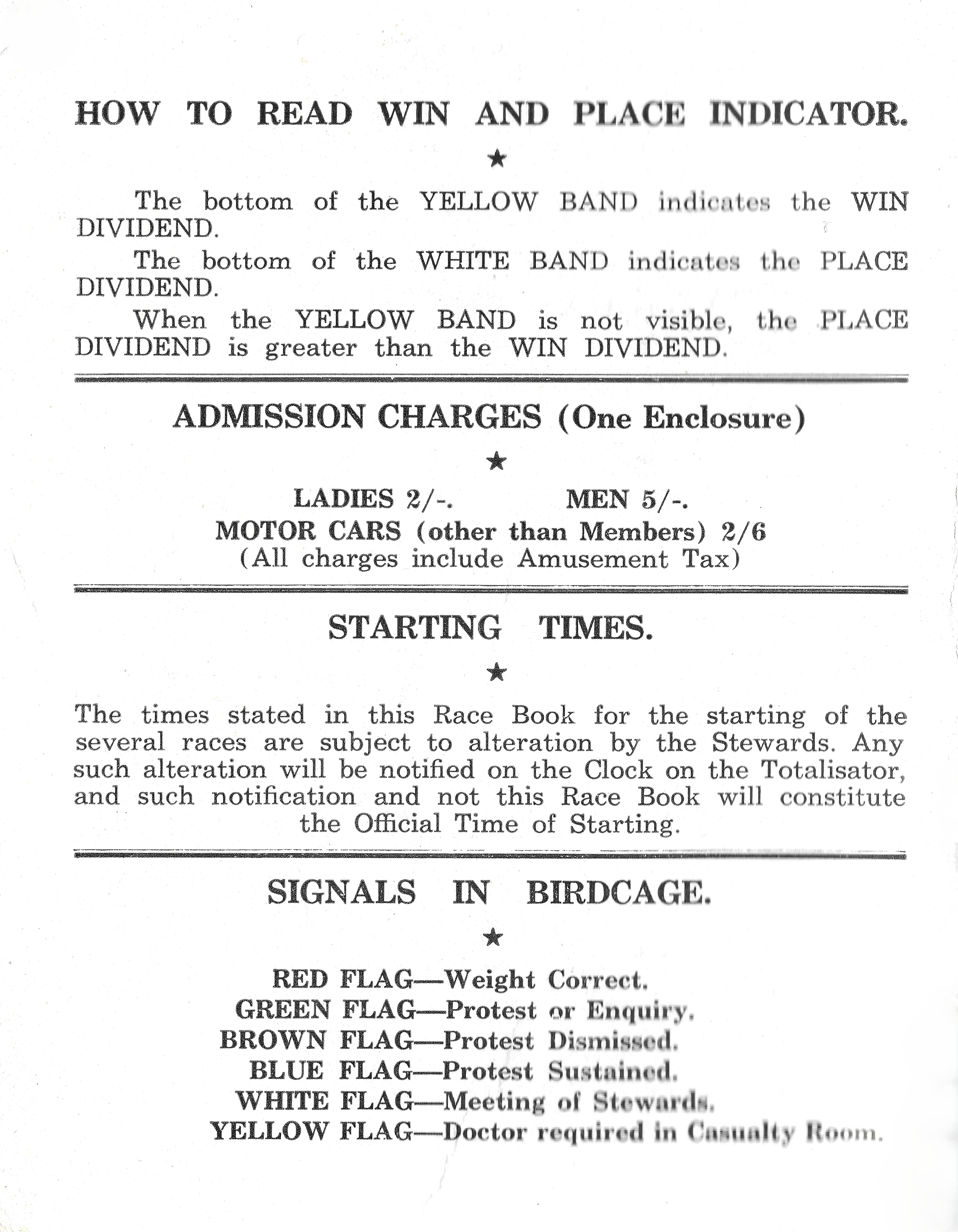
1960 HBJC Ormond Memorial Gold Cup admission charges and flag notices

=== Name ===
- Ormond Memorial (1955–1990)
- Kelt Capital Stakes (1991–2009)
- Kit Ormond Memorial (2010)
- NZB Insurance Spring Classic (2011–2012)
- The Turks Spring Classic (2013)
- Livamol Classic (2014–present)

=== Group status ===
- 1955-1978 (Stakes Race)
- 1979-1992 (Group 3)
- 1993-1995 (Group 2)
- 1996- (Group 1)

== Notable winners ==
- Balmerino (1977): NZ Horse of the Year (1976) and winner of the Rawson Stakes (1976) and the Brisbane Cup (1976)
- Castletown (1991): New Zealand Racing Hall of Fame stayer and three-time winner of the Wellington Cup (1991, 1992, 1994) also won the Auckland Cup (1992) and the Caulfield Stakes (1992)
- Jimmy Choux (2011): Champion 3 year old, 5 time group 1 winner and 2011 New Zealand Horse of the Year
- La Mer (1978, 1979): Champion mare and 1977 New Zealand Horse of the Year
- Lomondy (1986): Winner of the Adelaide Cup (1986), Brisbane Cup (1986) and the Caulfield Cup (1986)
- Melody Belle (2019, 2020): Champion mare with 14 group 1 races to her name. Two time New Zealand Horse of the Year (2019, 2020)
- Redcraze (1955): Who went to win the Caulfield Cup (1956) and the Cox Plate (1957)
- Solvit (1994): Winner of the Cox Plate (1994)
- Veandercross (1992): 8 time group 1 winner and 1993 Australian Champion Racehorse of the Year
- Xcellent (2005): Champion 3 year old and two time New Zealand Horse of the Year (2005, 2006)

== Results ==
Year	Winner	Jockey	Trainer	Time	Second	Third
2026	Waitak 59	Craig Grylls	Lance O'Sullivan & Andrew Scott	2:07.66 (soft)	Tuxedo 59	Who Knows 57
2025	Waitak 59	Craig Grylls	Lance O'Sullivan & Andrew Scott	2:06.59 (good), Ellerslie	El Vencedor 59	Sharp 'N' Smart 59
2024	Snazzytavi 57	Warren Kennedy	Graham Richardson & Rogan Norvall, Matamata	2:06.58 (soft), Te Rapa	Hi Yo Sass Bomb 57	No Compromise 59
2023	Ladies Man 59	Ryan Elliott	Allan Sharrock, New Plymouth	2:04.79 (good)	Platinum Invador 59	Pearl Of Alsace 57
2022	Mustang Valley 55.5	Michael McNab	Andrew Forsman, Cambridge	2:13.83 (heavy)	Justaskme 59	Defibrillate 59
2021	Savy Yong Blonk 57	Danielle Johnson	Jamie Richards, Matamata	2:04.50 (good)	Harlech 59	Prise De Fer 59
2020	Melody Belle 57	Troy Harris	Jamie Richards, Matamata	2:10.12 (heavy)	Avantage 57	Vadavar 59
2019	Melody Belle 57	Opie Bosson	Jamie Richards, Matamata	2:05.45 (good)	Peso 59	Crown Prosecutor 57.5
2018	Savvy Coup 55.5	Chris Johnson	Michael & Matthew Pitman, Riccarton	2:04.08 (good)	Lizzie L'Amour 57	Danzdanzdance 55.5
2017	Wait a Sec 59	Johnathan Parkes	Guy Lowry & Grant Cullen, Hastings	2:05.59 (good)	Gingernuts 57.5	Endean Rose 57
2016	Willie Cazals (IRE) 59	Craig Grylls	Lance O'Sullivan & Andrew Scott, Matamata	2:09.75 (heavy)	Humidor 57.5	Hasselhoof 59
2015	Addictive Habit 59	Sam Spratt	Lee Somervell, Cambridge	2:05.77 (good)	Benzini 59	Celebrity Miss 57
2014	Costume 57	Michael Coleman	Graeme & Debbie Rogerson, Tuhikaramea	2:02.66 (good)	Shuka 59	Soriano 57
2013	Ransomed 59	Johnathan Parkes	Gary Vile, Awapuni	2:04.21 (good)	Nashville 59	Survived 57.5
2012	Shez Sinsational 57	Opie Bosson	Allan Sharrock, New Plymouth	2:04.89 (good)	Guiseppina 57	He's Remarkable 59
2011	Jimmy Choux 57.5	Jonathan Riddell	John Bary, Hastings	2:06.24 (good)	Red Ruler 59	Hold It Harvey 59
2010	Wall Street 59	Michael Coleman	Jeff Lynds, Awapuni	2:02.97 (good)	Ginga Dude 59	Keep The Peace 55.5
2009	Vosne Romanee 59	Buddy Lammas	Jeff Lynds, Awapuni	2:08.42 (soft)	Ginga Dude 59	Miss Maren 57
2008	Princess Coup 56.5	Opie Bosson	Mark Walker, Matamata	2:04.58 (good)	Red Ruler 57.5	Nom Du Jeu 57.5
2007	Princess Coup 55	Noel Harris	Mark Walker, Matamata	2:04.16 (good)	J'Adane 55	Magic Cape 57.5
2006	Legs 55	Lisa Cropp	Kevin Gray, Awapuni	2:03.82 (soft)	Kerry O'Reilly 59	Seachange 55
2005	Xcellent 57	Michael Coleman	Mike & Paul Moroney, Matamata	2:03.21 (good)	Distinctly Secret 59	Waitoki Dream 59
2004	Balmuse 59	Jamie Bullard	Kevin Myers, Wanganui	2:05.03 (soft)	Starcraft 57	Zafar 59
2003	Distinctly Secret 59	Opie Bosson	Mark Walker, Matamata	2:03.64 (good)	Hail 59	Irish Rover 59
2002	Prized Gem 56.5	Michael Rodd	Murray Baker, Cambridge	2:04.10 (good)	Distinctly Secret 57	Hail 57
2001	Cinder Bella 56	Lance O'Sullivan	Karen Zimmerman, Otaki	2:03.31 (good)	Trounced 56	Hello Dolly 59
2000	The Message 59	Linda Ballantyne	John Ralph, Te Rapa	2:03.91 (soft)	Integrate 56	Magic Winner 56
1999	Cent Home 57	David Walker	Jim Wallace, Opaki	2:02.16 (good)	Rebel 57	Batavian 59
1998	Just Call Me Sir 47.5	Trudy Collett	Moira Murdoch, Pukekohe	2:04.06 (good)	Batavian 48	Fayreform 59
1997	Moss Downs 59	Michael Coleman	Chris McNab, Hastings	2:03.63 (soft)	Vialli 59	Magnet Bay 59
1996	Love Dance 56.5	Gary Grylls	Bev & Ken Kelso, Matamata	2:03.41 (soft)	Marconee 56	Lord Majestic 59
1995	Italian Saint 59	Tony Allan	Noel Eales, Awapuni	2:04.88 (soft)	Solvit 59	All In Fun 59
1994	Solvit 59	David Walsh	Moira Murdoch, Pukekohe	2:00.16 (good)	All In Fun 59	A Gordon For Me 59
1993	Calm Harbour 59	Lance O'Sullivan	Noel Eales, Awapuni	1:59.70 (good)	Solvit 59	Castletown 59
1992	Veandercross 57	Jim Walker	Chris Turner, Wanganui	2:09.81 (soft)	Conan 57	Castletown 59
1991	Castletown 59	Noel Harris	Paddy Busuttin, Foxton	2:04.71 (good)	Surfers Paradise 59	Megabucks 57
1990	Timandra Steed 59	David Johnson	James Clement, Hawera	2:00.03 (good)	Street Hawk 59	Mickey's Town 59
1989	Lomondy 59	David Walsh	Noel Eales, Awapuni	2:12.01 (heavy)	Gatcombe's Pride 59	Fairfield Lad 59
1988	Classic Bay 59	Ross Elliot	Merv Andrews, Awapuni	2:10.23		
1987	Secret Seal 59	Noel Harris	Jeff Lynds, Awapuni	2:04.15		
1986	Lomondy 59	Jim Walker	Noel Eales, Awapuni	2:06.42		
1985 (Spring)	Always Summer 56.5	David Walsh	Don Grubb, Fielding	2:04.20		
1985 (Autumn)	Deb's Mate 59	Debbie Healey	H S Wadham, Pukekohe	2:12.70		
1984	Commissionaire 58	Jim Cassidy	Noel Eales, Awapuni	2:02.57		
1983	Commissionaire 58	Jim Cassidy	Noel Eales, Awapuni	2:03.43		
1982	Ruanuku 58	Stephen Autridge	Miss L I Pratt, Cambridge	2:15.95		
1981	Serendiper 58	David Walsh	Mrs W L Sullivan, Te Rapa	2:05.3		
1980	Harmanaire 53.5	R Jenkins	T Nightingale, Hastings	2:04.04		
1979	La Mer 57	Des Harris	Malcolm Smith, New Plymouth	2:03		
1978	La Mer 56	Des Harris	Malcolm Smith, New Plymouth	2:08.4		
1977	Balmerino 57	M Campbell	B J Smith, Cambridge	2:08.2	Fraxy	
1976	Duty Free 58	R Jenkins	Mrs A Fogden, Manakau	2:12		
1975	Curly Wave 58	Bruce Compton	G O Mudgway, Te Rapa	2:04.8		
1974	Guest Star 53.5	R C Franklin	I J & I R Tucker, Takanini	2:19.8		
1973	Duty Free 9.2	R J Fergus	Mrs A Fogden, Manakau			
1972	Count Kereru 9.2	Garry Phillips	Miss A Bowman, Fielding			
1971	Game 9.2	Bruce Marsh	K H Quinlivan, Hastings			
1970	Game 9.2	Bruce Marsh	K H Quinlivan, Hastings			
1969	Game 9.2	Bruce Marsh	K H Quinlivan, Hastings			
1968	Dalvui 9.2	Bill Skelton	D Jones, Hastings			
1967	Terrific 9.0	G F Hughes	M & F Ritchie, Ellerslie			
1966	Palisade 9.2	Bob Skelton	D P Wilson, Wingatui			
1965	Empyreus 8.6	R W Taylor	K H Quinlivan, Hastings			
1964	Tatua 9.0	G R Edge	W J Pratt, Te Awamutu			
1963	Picaroon 9.2	B J Langford	K H Quinlivan, Hastings			
1962	Moy 8.12	K S Cullen	K Couper, Hastings			
1961	Picaroon 9.2	J Anderson	K H Quinlivan, Hastings			
1960	Picaroon 9.2	J Anderson	K H Quinlivan, Hastings			
1959	Supertax 9.0	V J Sellars	T C Alcock, Pukekohe			
1958 (Dead Heat)	Rover 8.6	W L Aitken	T B Mcneil, Hastings			
1958 (Dead Heat)	Savage 8.6	V J Sellars	E Temperton, Awapuni			
1957	Pinnacle Ridge 9.0	Bill Broughton	V E Bryant, Foxton			
1956	Syntax 8.6	N B Holland	S Walker, Hamilton			
1955	Redcraze 9.0	V J Sellars	Syd Brown, Woodville			

== See also ==
- A list of the winners of all 3 Hawkes Bay Triple Crown events is at Thoroughbred racing in New Zealand
- Hawke's Bay Guineas
