= 2022 New Zealand Derby =

The 2022 New Zealand Derby was a Group I horse race which took place at Ellerslie Racecourse on Saturday 5 March 2022. It was the 147th running of the New Zealand Derby, and it was won by Asterix.

Asterix became the second consecutive winner of the New Zealand Derby for his trainers, the Matamata-based partnership of Lance O'Sullivan and Andrew Scott. He was also the second Derby winner in the green and red colours of the Kelt family, who also owned the 1993 winner Popsy. Former international cricketer Mark Greatbatch also shares in the ownership.

Asterix was bred by Sir Owen Glenn's Go Bloodstock, and he was bought for NZ$450,000 at the 2020 New Zealand Bloodstock Ready to Run Sale by bloodstock agent Bruce Perry.

Asterix made his debut less than two months before his Derby triumph, finishing sixth in a 1400-metre race at Matamata on January 12. An eighth placing followed at Te Rapa on February 2, before Asterix stepped up to 2100 metres and recorded a maiden victory at Tauranga on February 16.

The Derby was a massive step up in class for the emerging stayer, who was sent out as one of the outsiders of the field at 45-to-one. Pre-race attention was dominated by the high-class filly La Crique, who had scored runaway victories in the Desert Gold Stakes and Avondale Guineas in her two previous starts.

But after biding his time at the back of the field, Asterix and Johnathan Parkes began to creep forward out wide as the field made their way down the side of the track. Asterix swooped around the extreme outside at the home turn and challenged for the lead at the top of the straight, bounding clear with less than 200 metres to run.

La Crique was in an awkward position at the turn and took a crucial few seconds to work her way into the clear, by which time Asterix was well out of reach, winning by a length and a half.

The race time, 2:27.24, was the equal fourth-fastest time in the history of the New Zealand Derby.

== Race details ==
- Sponsor: Vodafone New Zealand
- Prize money: NZ$1,000,000
- Track: Dead
- Number of runners: 12
- Winner's time: 2:27.24

== Full result ==
| | Margin | Horse | Jockey | Trainer(s) | Odds |
|---|---|---|---|---|---|
| 1 | | Asterix | Johnathan Parkes | Lance O'Sullivan & Andrew Scott | $46.20 |
| 2 | 1½ | La Crique | Vinnie Colgan | Simon & Katrina Alexander | $1.30 |
| 3 | ½ | Regal Lion | Matthew Cameron | Murray Baker & Andrew Forsman | $41.20 |
| 4 | 4½ | Soldier Boy | Kate Hercock | Gavin Sharrock | $140.10 |
| 5 | ½ | Pinarello | Jonathan Riddell | Roger James & Robert Wellwood | $7.70 |
| 6 | ½ | Nest Egg | Ashvin Goindasamy | Roydon Bergerson | $41.00 |
| 7 | 1 | White Noise | Ryan Elliot | Murray Baker & Andrew Forsman | $10.90 |
| 8 | Nose | Arjay's Flight | Trudy Thornton | Mark Brosnan | $23.40 |
| 9 | 2 | Privileged Son | Kozzi Asano | Murray Baker & Andrew Forsman | $57.00 |
| 10 | 1 | Ess Vee Are | Sam Weatherley | Darryn Weatherley | $46.20 |
| 11 | Neck | Yes We Khan | Andrew Calder | Bruce Wallace & Grant Cooksley | $140.10 |
| 12 | 5 | Marchand | Leith Innes | Lance Noble | $21.80 |

== Winner's details ==
Further details of the winner, Asterix:

- Foaled: 10 November 2018
- Sire: Tavistock; Dam: Mourasana (Shirocco)
- Owner: D & B Kelt, A & L Scott & Mark Greatbatch
- Trainer: Lance O'Sullivan & Andrew Scott
- Breeder: Go Bloodstock New Zealand Ltd
- Starts: 4
- Wins: 2
- Seconds: 0
- Thirds: 0
- Earnings: $607,200

=== The road to the Derby ===
Early-season appearances prior to running in the Derby.

- La Crique – 3rd Trevor & Corallie Eagle Memorial, 1st Desert Gold Stakes, 1st Avondale Guineas
- Regal Lion - 5th Waikato Guineas, 7th Avondale Guineas
- Soldier Boy - 1st Wanganui Guineas, 6th Hawke's Bay Guineas, 9th Sarten Memorial, 4th Wellington Stakes, 8th Waikato Guineas
- Nest Egg - 5th Wanganui Guineas, 10th Hawke's Bay Guineas, 9th Avondale Guineas
- White Noise - 1st Wellington Stakes, 6th Auckland Guineas, 1st Gingernuts Salver, 4th Avondale Guineas
- Montre Moi - 11th Trevor Eagle Memorial, 3rd Karaka Million 3YO Classic, 4th Waikato Guineas
- Arjay's Flight - 3rd Gingernuts Salver, 4th Waikato Guineas, 2nd Avondale Guineas
- Marchand - 8th Sarten Memorial, 3rd Uncle Remus Stakes, 3rd Avondale Guineas

=== Subsequent Group 1 wins ===
Subsequent wins at Group 1 level by runners in the 2022 New Zealand Derby.

- La Crique - 2022 Arrowfield Stud Plate, 2024 Otaki-Maori Weight for Age
- Pinarello – 2022 Queensland Derby

== See also ==
- Recent winners of major NZ 3 year old races
