= Starcraft (disambiguation) =

StarCraft is a real-time strategy video game franchise by Blizzard Entertainment.

Starcraft or StarCraft may also refer to:

== Entertainment ==
- StarCraft (comics), a comic book series based on the video game
- StarCraft (video game), the first installment in the video game series

== Transport ==
- Starship, or starcraft, a theoretical spacecraft designed for traveling between planetary systems
- Starcraft (horse), an Australian racehorse
- Starcraft Bus, a division of Forest River that manufactures buses
- Starcraft Marine, a brand of boats for fishing and travel

== Other uses ==
- Astrology, divination based on the movements and positions of celestial objects
