= Princess Coup =

Australian-bred Thoroughbred racehorse

- Sire: Encosta De Lago
- Grandsire: Fairy King
- Dam: Stoneyfell Road
- Damsire: Sovereign Red
- Sex: Mare
- Foaled: 2003
- Country: Australia
- Colour: Chestnut
- Breeder: Ingenue Breeding Syndicate
- Owner: Bromley Bloodstock Ltd & Raymond A. Coupland
- Trainer: Mark Walker
- Record: 33: 12-7-3
- Earnings: A$3,751,316

Major wins
- New Zealand Oaks (2007); Kelt Capital Stakes (2007, 2008); Desert Gold Stakes (2007); Lowland Stakes (2007); Stoneybridge Stakes (2008)

Princess Coup (foaled 2003 in Australia) is a New Zealand thoroughbred racehorse. She is most noted for twice winning the Kelt Capital Stakes, one of New Zealand's premier races, in 2007 and 2008.

She was officially retired in January 2009, with a career record of 12 wins from 33 starts, and NZ$4.2 million in earnings.

== Notable performances ==
2006

- 2nd in the New Zealand 1000 Guineas (ridden by Michael Walker) behind Dorabella with Velvet And Satin 3rd
- 3rd in the New Zealand 2000 Guineas (Chris Johnson) behind Magic Cape and Jokers Wild
- 2nd in the Cambridge Stud Eight Carat Classic over 1600m at Ellerslie (Opie Bosson) behind Veloce Bella with Irland 3rd

2007

- 1st in the Desert Gold Stakes (Opie Bosson) beating Veloce Bella and Shira
- 2nd in the Group 2 Cambridge Stud Sir Tristram Fillies Classic over 2000m at Te Rapa (Opie Bosson) behind Veloce Bella and Santagostino
- 1st in the G3 Lowland Stakes over 2100m at Trentham (Chris Johnson) beating Castlebar and Soelin
- 1st in the New Zealand Oaks (Opie Bosson) beating Overkaast and Veloce Bella
- 3rd in the Stoney Bridge Stakes (Noel Harris) behind Seachange and Sir Slick
- 1st in the Kelt Capital Stakes (Noel Harris) beating J'Adane and Magic Cape
- 3rd in the Caulfield Cup (Glen Boss) behind Master O'Reilly and Douro Valley
- 2nd in the Mackinnon (Kerrin McEvoy) behind Sirmione
- 13th in the 2007 Melbourne Cup (Noel Harris) won by Efficient

2008

- 1st in the St George Stakes (Damien Oliver) beating Sirmione
- 2nd in the Australian Cup (Damien Oliver) behind Sirmione
- 2nd in the Ranvet Stakes (Damien Oliver) behind Tuesday Joy
- 2nd in The BMW Stakes (Damien Oliver) behind Tuesday Joy
- 1st in the Stoney Bridge Stakes (Opie Bosson) beating Nom du Jeu and Fritzy Boy
- 1st in the Kelt Capital Stakes (Opie Bosson) beating Red Ruler and Nom du Jeu
