= Mannerism Stakes =

- Class: Group 3
- Location: Caulfield Racecourse
- Inaugurated: 1988
- Race type: Thoroughbred
- Sponsor: Catanach's Jewellers (2026)

Race information
- Distance: 1,400 metres
- Surface: Turf
- Qualification: Mares four years old and older that are not maidens
- Weight: Set weights with penalties
- Purse: $200,000 (2026)

The Mannerism Stakes is a Melbourne Racing Club Group 3 Thoroughbred horse race for mares aged four years old and older, held under Set Weights conditions with penalties, over a distance of 1400 metres at Caulfield Racecourse in Melbourne, Australia in late February.

== History ==
The registered race is named after Mannerism, who won the 1991 Australasian Oaks and 1992 Caulfield Cup.

=== Name ===
- 1989–1994 - The Fashion Stakes
- 1995–2014 - Mannerism Stakes
- 2015 - Premier Signs Stakes

=== Grade ===
- 1988–1992 - Listed race
- 1993 onwards - Group 3 race

=== Distance ===
- 1996–1997 – 1411 metres

=== Venue ===
In 1996 and 2023 the event was held at Flemington Racecourse.

== Winners ==
The following are past winners of the race.

- 2026 - Bossy Benita
- 2025 - Coeur Volante
- 2024 - Revolutionary Miss
- 2023 - Espiona
- 2022 - Flying Mascot
- 2021 - Rich Hips
- 2020 - Greysful Glamour
- 2019 - Jamaican Rain
- 2018 - Silent Sedition
- 2017 - Silent Sedition
- 2016 - †Tuscan Sling
- 2015 - Tycoon Tara
- 2014 - Bonaria
- 2013 - Star Of Giselle
- 2012 - Hi Belle
- 2011 - Red Flair
- 2010 - Tootsie
- 2009 - Symphony Miss
- 2008 - Catechuchu
- 2007 - Seachange
- 2006 - Kats Clause
- 2005 - Lyrical Bid
- 2004 - Royal Sash
- 2003 - Galapagos Girl
- 2002 - Spurn
- 2001 - Typhoon Billie
- 2000 - Londolozi
- 1999 - Miss Jugah
- 1998 - Blue Storm
- 1997 - Red Nile
- 1996 - Tolanda
- 1995 - Laura's Express
- 1994 - Princess Plume
- 1993 - Tarare
- 1992 - Val De Grace
- 1991 - Princess Pushy
- 1990 - Memphis Blues
- 1989 - English Charm
- 1988 - Even True

Notes:
† The 2016 race was won by Azkadellia but was disqualified by Racing Victoria because convicted criminal Peter Foster was the 'mastermind' behind an arrangement with her racing manager Ben Connolly to deceive stewards over the true ownership.

== See also ==
- List of Australian Group races
- Group races
