= Kawi (horse) =

New Zealand thoroughbred racehorse

- Sire: Savabeel
- Grandsire: Zabeel (NZ)
- Dam: Magic Time (NZ)
- Damsire: Volksraad (GB)
- Sex: Gelding
- Foaled: 24 October 2010
- Country: New Zealand
- Colour: Bay
- Breeder: Christine & John Goodin, Warea
- Owner: John Goodin, Tony Kemp, G A MacDonald, G H Phillips, Bruce & S A Sharrock & Estate of A A Baeyertz
- Trainer: Allan Sharrock
- Record: 38: 15-7-5
- Earnings: $1,356,412.50

Major wins
- 2015 Makfi Challenge Stakes; 2015 Zabeel Classic; 2016 Thorndon Mile; 2016 Makfi Challenge Stakes; 2016 Windsor Park Plate; 2017 Otaki-Maori Weight for Age; 2017 Captain Cook Stakes

Kawi (foaled 24 October 2010) is a retired New Zealand Thoroughbred racehorse that won seven Group 1 races.

== Racing career ==
Kawi was trained by Allan Sharrock at New Plymouth. He was runner-up behind True Spirit in his first race on 22 November 2013, a maiden three-year-old event over 1200 metres at New Plymouth. A few weeks later, he secured his first victory, in his second start, in a 1400‑metre race for three-year-olds at Trentham.

He won 15 races including 7 Group victories. In July 2018 he was retired due to issues with his joints and fetlocks and wear and tear.

Notable performances by Kawi include:

Placing	Year	Race	1st	2nd	3rd
1st	2015	Taranaki Cup (Group 3, 1800 m),	Kawi	Iamishwara	Re Deel
1st	2015	Makfi Challenge Stakes (Group 1)	Kawi	Ryan Mark	Ginner Hart
1st	2015	Manawatu Challenge Stakes (Group 2, 1400 m)	Kawi	Mighty Solomon	Tomorrowland
1st	2015	Zabeel Classic (Group 1)	Kawi	Stolen Dance	Authentic Paddy
1st	2016	Thorndon Mile (Group 1)	Kawi	Stolen Dance	Sports Illustrated
3rd	2016	Herbie Dyke Stakes	Valley Girl	Stolen Dance	Kawi
1st	2016	Makfi Challenge Stakes (Group 1)	Kawi	El Pescado	Farm Boy
1st	2016	Windsor Park Plate (Group 1)	Kawi	Mime	Rasa Lila
4th	2016	Kingston Town Classic (Group 1, 1800 m at Ascot)	Stratum Star	Scales of Justice	Perfect Rendition
1st	2017	Otaki-Maori Weight for Age (Group 1)	Kawi	Start Wondering	Sofia Rosa
3rd	2017	Foxbridge Plate (Group 2, 1200m)	Underthemoonlight	Close Up	Kawi
3rd	2017	Windsor Park Plate	Gingernuts	Close up	Kawi
3rd	2017	Tauranga Stakes (Group 2, 1600 m)	Ocean Emperor	Miss Wilson	Kawi
1st	2017	Captain Cook Stakes (Group 1)	Kawi	Consensus	Sofia Rosa
2nd	2018	Telegraph Handicap	Enzo's Lad	Kawi	Ferrando

== See also ==
- Thoroughbred racing in New Zealand
