= La Mer (horse) =

New Zealand-bred Thoroughbred racehorse

- Sire: Copenhagen II
- Grandsire: Royal Charger
- Dam: La Balsa
- Damsire: Worden
- Sex: Mare
- Foaled: 1973
- Country: New Zealand
- Colour: Chestnut
- Trainer: Malcolm Smith
- Record: 34:24-2-2
- Earnings: NZ$223,304

Major wins
- Manawatu Sires Produce Stakes (1976); New Zealand Oaks (1977); Great Northern Oaks (1977); Trentham Stakes (1977); Awapuni Gold Cup (1978); Desert Gold Stakes (1978); Ormond Memorial Stakes (1978,1979); Air New Zealand Stakes (1979)

Honours
- New Zealand Horse of the Year 1975, 1977.
- Last updated on April 3, 2009

La Mer was a thoroughbred racehorse, who raced from 1976 to 1979.

La Mer was sired by Copenhagen II from La Balsa (New Zealand). She was bred by Jack Alexander at Cranleigh Stud in Wanganui and born on Melbourne Cup day in 1973. Later she was sold to Mr L (Allen) Alexander of Wynthorpe Stud, Tikorangi.

She was trained by Malcolm Smith at Bell Block, New Plymouth.

She raced and won 24 times out of 43 starts, as well as second 5 times and third 6 times in 1200m to 2400m, winning NZ$225,925 and AUS$19,500 in stake money.

La Mer was the 1979 New Zealand Horse of the Year and 1977 Filly of the Year.

== Racing career ==
La Mer won numerous Weight for Age races in New Zealand. She also won the Coongy Handicap and placed second in the Mackinnon Stakes in Australia.

The following are some of her race results.

Month/Year	Placing	Race	Venue	Distance	Jockey	Winning Time	1st	2nd	3rd
February 1976	1st	Sapling Stakes Handicap	Woodville	1200m	Des Harris		La Mer		
March 1976	1st	NRM Foods Juvenile Handicap	Taranaki	1200m	Des Harris		La Mer	Beauty Spot	
March 1976	1st	Manawatu Sires Produce Stakes	Awapuni	1400m	Des Harris	1:23	La Mer 50	Elton	Vice Regal
September 1976	1st	Gold Trail Stakes	Hastings	1400m	Des Harris		La Mer	Dolly Chihuahua	
October 1976	2nd	Lowland Stakes	Masterton	1400m	Des Harris	-	So Fox	La Mer	
October 1976	1st	Desert Gold Stakes	Trentham	1600m	Des Harris		La Mer	Regal Band	Rina
December 1976	1st	Eulogy Stakes	Awapuni	1600m	Des Harris		La Mer	Astelia	Regal Band
January 1977	1st	Royal Stakes	Ellerslie	2000m	Des Harris		La Mer	So Fox	Noble Mistress
January 1977	1st	New Zealand Oaks	Trentham	2400m	Des Harris	2:29.25	La Mer 55	Blintz	Star Chick
February 1977	6th	Lion Brown Sprint	Te Rapa	1400m	Des Harris	-	Soliloquy 56	Balmerino	Battle Eve
March 1977	1st	Manawatu Breeders Stakes	Awapuni	2000m	Des Harris		La Mer	Even Azure	Zamazaan Lass
March 1977	3rd	Awapuni Gold Cup	Awapuni	2000m	Des Harris	-	Balmerino	Copper Belt	La Mer
April 1977	1st	Great Northern Oaks	Ellerslie	2400m	Des Harris		La Mer	Mother's Pearl	
April 1977	3rd	Championship Stakes	Avondale	2000m	Des Harris	-	Vice Regal	Sonic Light	La Mer
October 1977	3rd	Shorts Handicap	Trentham	1200m	Des Harris		Empha Llan		La Mer
October 1977	2nd	McKelvie Memorial Handicap	Rangitikei	1400m	Des Harris	-		La Mer	
November 1977	1st	Levin Cup Stakes	Levin	1600m	Des Harris	1:40.6 Soft	La Mer 54.5	Battle Eve 55.5	Copper Belt 58
November 1977	3rd	Owens Stakes	Auckland	1600m	Des Harris	-	Braless 48.5	Shifnal's Pride 55.5	La Mer 54.5
December 1977	1st	Pukekohe Auckland Thoroughbred Breeders Stakes	Franklin RC	1600m	Des Harris	1:33.9 Firm	La Mer 54.5	Braless 49	Battle Eve 55.5
December 1977	1st	Manawatu Challenge Stakes	Awapuni	1600m	Des Harris	1:39.2 Easy	La Mer 54.5	Copper Belt 58	Top Quality 52
January 1978	12th	Auckland Cup	Ellerslie	3200m	Des Harris	-	Stylemaster 51	Harp 52	Good Lord 59
February 1978	5th	Wairarapa Thoroughbred Breeders Stakes	Carterton RC	2000m	Des Harris	-	Ariana 55.5	Exotic 56.5	Astelia 55.5
February 1978	1st	New Zealand International Stakes	Te Rapa	2200m	Des Harris	2:13.85 Firm	La Mer 55.5	Carlaw 58	Uncle Remus 52
March 1978	3rd	Air New Zealand Stakes	Ellerslie	2000m	Des Harris	-	Serendiper 57	Good Lord 58	La Mer 55.5
March 1978	1st	Rotorua Travel Lodge Stakes	Rotorua	1900m	Des Harris	1:55.9 Firm	La Mer 55.5	Lady Libra 55.5	Jackwill 56.5
April 1978	1st	Awapuni Gold Cup	Awapuni	2000m	Des Harris	2:03.2 Good	La Mer 56	Even Son 57	Seven Forty Seven 58
April 1978	1st	Ormond Memorial Gold Cup	Hastings	2000m	Des Harris	2:08.4 Soft	La Mer 56	Red Terror 57	Clive Comet 53.5
August 1978	-	Robinson Handicap	Foxton	1200m	Peter Graham	-	Smart Fella		
September 1978	2nd	London Woolbrokers Handicap	Hawkes Bay	1400m	Des Harris	-		La Mer	
September 1978	3rd	Doncaster Handicap	Auckland	1600m	Des Harris	-			La Mer
October 1978	1st	Coongy Handicap	Caulfield	2000m	Des Harris	2:01.5	La Mer 58	Taksan 53.5	Hearts Are Trumps 51.5
October 1978	6th	Cox Plate	Moonie Valley	2050m	Des Harris	2:08.7	So Called 57	Family of Man 59	Kara Man 48.5
November 1978	2nd	Mackinnon Stakes	Victoria	2000m	Des Harris	2:04.0	Family of Man 58.5	La Mer 56	Kankama 49.5
December 1978	1st	Topsy Stakes	Otaki	2000m	Des Harris		La Mer	Regal Band	
December 1978	1st	Manawatu Challenge Stakes	Awapuni	1600m	Des Harris	1:37.6 Good	La Mer 55.5	Kanga's Lad 58	Varnamo 58
January 1979	1st	Pahiatua WFA Stakes	Pahiatua	2000m	Des Harris	2:05 Firm	La Mer 57	Kindled 55.5	Chinkara 56.5
February 1979	1st	Wairarapa Breeders Stakes	Carterton RC	2000m	Des Harris		La Mer		
February 1979	4th	New Zealand International Stakes	Waikato RC	2000m	Des Harris	-	Shivaree 57	Regal Band 56.5	Oakvale 58
March 1979	1st	New Zealand Stakes	Ellerslie	2000m	Des Harris	2:03.49 Firm	La Mer 56.5	Shivaree 57	March Legend 58
March 1979	6th	Australian Cup	Victoria	2000m	Des Harris	2:01.1	Dulcify 52.5	Manikato 52.5	Family of Man 58
March 1979	-	Queen Elizabeth Stakes WFA	Victoria	2500m	Des Harris	2:40.3	Lefroy 57	Northfleet 57	Hauberk 52
April 1979	2nd	Hawkes Bay Challenge Stakes	Hastings	1400m	Des Harris	-	Vice Regal 57.5	La Mer 56.5	Fraxy 57.5
April 1979	1st	Ormond Memorial Gold Cup	Hastings	2000m	Des Harris	2:03 Firm	La Mer 57	Mun Lee 56	Vice Regal 58

== Progeny ==
After finishing her racing, La Mer was purchased by Irish owner Captain Tim Rogers and exported to Ireland for her breeding career.

La Mer's first foal, Loughmore (Ire), by Artaius, winner of the Sandown Eclipse Stakes, was brought to New Zealand where she won once from ten starts and produced the Group One Manawatu Sires Produce Stakes winner Little Jamie.

La Mer left seven winners, although none had the quality of herself. However, she is:

- the great grand-dam of Nahrain, winner of the 2011 Coral Distaff and Prix de l'Opéra and the 2012 Flower Bowl Stakes.
- the great great grand-dam of Benbatl, the son of Hahrain and winner of the 2018 Caulfield Stakes along with a number of other Group races in Europe and Dubhai. Benbatl became a stud stallion.

== See also ==
- Thoroughbred racing in New Zealand
