= Nom Du Jeu =

New Zealand-bred Thoroughbred racehorse

- Sire: Montjeu
- Grandsire: Sadler's Wells
- Dam: Prized Gem
- Damsire: Prized
- Sex: Stallion
- Foaled: 2002
- Country: New Zealand
- Colour: Brown
- Breeder: Mrs WM Morton (NZ)
- Owner: Mrs WM Morton (NZ)
- Trainer: Murray Baker
- Record: 23: 4-7-2
- Earnings: A$1,988,488

Major wins
- AJC Derby (2008)
- Last updated on 13 October 2017

Nom Du Jeu is a New Zealand thoroughbred racehorse. He won the 2008 AJC Australian Derby, beating Red Ruler in a rare New Zealand quinella in an Australian Group One race. The win made him the first New Zealand male three-year-old to win an Australian Group One since Our Maizcay in the 1995 Caulfield Guineas, and the first New Zealander to win a Group One in Sydney since Honor Babe in the 2003 Sydney Cup.

Nom Du Jeu continued this form as a four-year-old. A first-up win (which was later taken off him after a positive swab) was followed by placings in the Stoney Bridge Stakes and Kelt Capital Stakes. He then travelled to Australia, where he finished second in the Caulfield Cup and eighth in the Melbourne Cup. He was retired after competing in the 2009 W. S. Cox Plate.

As of 2017, Nom Du Jeu stands at Raheen Stud in Queensland, where he has sired 43 winners from 105 runners

== See also ==
- Thoroughbred racing in New Zealand
- Thoroughbred racing in Australia
