= Solvit (horse) =

New Zealand thoroughbred racehorse

- Sire: Morcon (GB)
- Grandsire: Morston (Fra)
- Dam: Yallah Sun (Aus)
- Damsire: Yallah Native (USA)
- Sex: Gelding
- Foaled: 23 September 1988
- Country: New Zealand
- Colour: Bay
- Breeder: R Neil Waddell
- Owner: Doug & Adrienne Alderslade, Michael & Moira Murdoch
- Trainer: Moira Murdoch
- Record: 52: 15-7-4
- Earnings: $2,097,084

Solvit (23 September 1988 – 11 April 2015) was a New Zealand Thoroughbred racehorse that won three races at Group 1 level, including the 1994 Cox Plate ridden by David Walsh. He was sired by Morcon (GB), winner of the Prince of Wales's Stakes and his dam was Yallah Sun (Aus).

== Racing career ==
Solvit was trained by Moira Murdoch at Waiuku, South Auckland. His first race was an 840m race for 2-year-olds on 6 December 1990 at Ellerslie in which he placed 4th behind Anatural. On 27 February 1991 he had his first win, a 1200m race at Counties. He was ridden in most of his early races by Tony Allan. David Walsh rode Solvit in his 1993 New Zealand Stakes victory and all subsequent races.

Notable performances by Solvit include:

| Placing | Year | Race | Jockey | 1st | 2nd | 3rd |
|---|---|---|---|---|---|---|
| 3rd | 1991 | Hawke's Bay Guineas (Listed 1400m, Hastings) | Tony Allan | Veandercross | Overwhelmed | Solvit |
| 1st | 1991 | Wellington Thoroughbred Breeders Guineas (Group 2, 1600m, Trentham) | Tony Allan | Solvit | Veandercross | Lord Majestic |
| 2nd | 1992 | Challenge Stakes (Group 3, 1600m, Ellerslie) | Peter Tims | Kiwi Golfer | Solvit | Lodore Lady |
| 1st | 1992 | Crystal Mile (Group 3, 1600m, Moonee Valley) | Grant Cooksley | Solvit | Vows | Instrumental |
| 3rd | 1992 | Bluebird Foods Trophy (Group 2, 1600m, Ellerslie) | Grant Cooksley | Corndale | Moire | Solvit |
| 1st | 1993 | New Zealand Stakes (Group 1, 2000m, Ellerslie) | David Walsh | Solvit | Whitford Hill | Kiss |
| 3rd | 1993 | Russell's Akai Television Stakes (Group 3, 1400m, Hastings) | David Walsh | Calm Harbour | Veandercross | Solvit |
| 2nd | 1993 | Kelt Capital Stakes (Group 2, 2000m, Hastings) | David Walsh | Calm Harbour | Solvit | Castletown |
| 2nd | 1993 | Cox Plate | David Walsh | The Phantom Chance | Solvit | Golden Sword |
| 1st | 1993 | Manawatu Challenge Stakes (Listed, 1400m, Awapuni) | David Walsh | Solvit | Vain Sovereign | The Phantom |
| 1st | 1994 | Action TV Sales Stakes (Group 1, 2000m, Ellerslie) | David Walsh | Solvit | Miltak | All Or Nothing |
| 2nd | 1994 | Enerco Stakes (Group 2, 1400m, Hastings) | David Walsh | Snap | Solvit | Veandercross |
| 1st | 1994 | Kelt Capital Stakes | David Walsh | Solvit | All In Fun | A Gordon For Me |
| 1st | 1994 | Cox Plate | David Walsh | Solvit | Rough Habit | Redding |
| 2nd | 1994 | Manawatu Challenge Stakes | David Walsh | Calm Harbour | Solvit | Z'Oro |
| 1st | 1995 | Japan Racing Association Trophy (Group 3, 2000m, Ellerslie) | David Walsh | Solvit | Brilliant Venture | Ball Park |
| 3rd | 1995 | Enerco Stakes | David Walsh | Marconee | Snap | Solvit |
| 2nd | 1995 | Kelt Capital Stakes | David Walsh | Italian Saint | Solvit | All In Fun |
| 1st | 1995 | Montana Challenge Stakes (Group 3, 1600m, Ellerslie) | David Walsh | Solvit | Bay Gin | Knockrobin |

Solvit contested the 1995 Cox Plate won by Octagonal but could only place 13th out of 14 starters after having briefly led the field going into the turn. After a spell he started twice in New Zealand in 1996 without success and was retired.

Solvit died after being struck down by colic in April 2015.

== See also ==
- Thoroughbred racing in New Zealand
