= Proisir Plate =

Proisir Plate (Challenge Stakes)
- Class: Group I
- Location: Ellerslie Racecourse, Auckland. Formerly Hastings Racecourse; Hawke's Bay, New Zealand
- Inaugurated: 1976
- Race type: Thoroughbred – Flat racing
- Website: www.hawkesbayracing.co.nz

Race information
- Distance: 1400m (7 furlongs)
- Surface: Turf
- Track: Right-handed (Ellerslie). Left-handed (Hastings)
- Qualification: Three-year-olds and up
- Weight: Weight for Age
- Purse: NZ$400,000 (2026)

The Proisir Plate also known as the Challenge Stakes is a Thoroughbred horse race historically run at Hastings Racecourse in Hawke's Bay and is New Zealand's first Group One race of the season. It is run over a distance of 1400m in September. Previously named the Tarzino Trophy, the race has been transferred to Ellerslie due to the Hastings racecourse out of action in 2025 and 2026.

The race is the first of the Hawkes Bay Triple Crown events and is followed by:

- the 1600m Howden Insurance Mile in late September, and
- the 2040m Livamol Classic in October.

The race's timing, weight-for-age conditions and the reliably dry weather of the region at that time of the year makes the race have a strong field. Many horses heading towards a campaign in Australia choose it as a starting point.

== History ==
The Hawkes Bay Challenge Stakes was first run in April 1976 as a new Weight for age sprint to take place during the Hawkes Bay autumn carnival. The inaugural running of the event was won by New Zealand Racing Hall of Fame inductee Grey Way, ridden by Bob Skelton.

When the group grading system was introduced in New Zealand in the 1978/79 season the Challenge Stakes was given group 3 status. In 1985 the race was moved from autumn to spring and was downgraded to listed status for a time, it would regain its group status in the 1991/92 racing season.

The 2025 edition was held at Ellerslie due to the Hastings track being closed.

=== Name of race ===
- Hawkes Bay Challenge Stakes (1976–1989)
- Byerley Thoroughbred Stakes (1990)
- Russell's Toshiba TV Stakes (1991–1992)
- Russell's Akai Television Stakes (1993)
- Enerco Stakes (1994–1997)
- Mudgway Stakes (1998–2010)
- Makfi Challenge Stakes (2011–2016) named after Makfi, a British born shuttle stallion who stood at Westbury Stud.
- Tarzino Trophy (2017–2024) named after Tarzino, winner of the 2015 Victoria Derby and 2016 Rosehill Guineas and a sire who stood at Westbury Stud.
- Proisir Plate (2025–) named after Proisir, winner of the 2012 Spring Stakes (Newcastle) and an active sire at Rich Hill Stud.

=== Group status ===
- 1976–1978 (Stakes Race)
- 1979–1983 (Group 3)
- 1984–1990 (Listed)
- 1991–1993 (Group 3)
- 1994–2002 (Group 2)
- 2003–present (Group 1)

== Notable winners ==
- Grey Way – winner of 51 races and New Zealand Racing Hall of Fame inductee
- Kawi – 7 Group 1 wins
- Melody Belle – 14 Group 1 wins including a record 13 in New Zealand and two time New Zealand Horse of the Year (2019, 2020)
- Mufhasa – 10 group 1 wins and two time New Zealand Horse of the Year (2009, 2012)
- Ocean Park – winner of the 2012 W S Cox Plate and 2013 New Zealand Horse of the Year
- Poetic Prince – winner of the 1988 W S Cox Plate and 1989 New Zealand Horse of the Year
- Rough Habit – 11 Australasian Group 1 wins and New Zealand Racing Hall of Fame inductee
- Seachange – 7 Group 1 wins and 2-time winner of New Zealand Horse of the Year (2006 and 2007)
- Starcraft – Australian visitor and subsequent European champion winning the Queen Elizabeth II Stakes in Britain and the Prix du Moulin de Longchamp in France
- Sunline – arguably New Zealand's greatest mare, winning 13 group 1 races throughout Australasia including 2 Cox Plates, 4 times New Zealand Horse of the Year (1999, 2000, 2001 and 2002), New Zealand Racing Hall of Fame and Australian Racing Hall of Fame inductee
- Surfers Paradise – winner of the 1991 W S Cox Plate

Seachange, Kawi, Melody Belle and Callsign Mav are all back-to-back winners of the race.

== Race results ==
Year	Winner	Jockey	Trainer(s)	Time	2nd	3rd
2026 (at Ellerslie)	Well Written	Matt Cartwright	Stephen Marsh	1:23.16 (soft)	Alabama Lass 57	Media World 59
2025 (at Ellerslie)	Quintessa 57	Rory Hutchings	Mark Walker & Sam Bergerson	1:26.00 (soft)	La Crique 57	Tomodachi 57
2024	Grail Seeker 56.5	Matt Cartwright	Lance O'Sullivan & Andrew Scott	1:21.46 (good)	Faraglioni 57	Sacred Satono 59
2023	Skew Wiff 56.5	Opie Bosson	Mark Walker & Sam Bergerson	1:23.15 (soft)	Dragon Leap 59	Legarto 56.5
2022	Dark Destroyer 58.5	Lisa Allpress	Lance O'Sullivan & Andrew Scott	1:32.49 (heavy)	Spring Tide 59	La Crique 56.5
2021	Callsign Mav 59	Jonathan Riddell	John Bary, Hastings	1:25.98 (heavy)	Spring Tide 59	Masetto 59
2020	Callsign Mav 58.5	Jonathan Riddell	John Bary, Hastings	1:22.12 (dead)	Supera 57	Avantage 57
2019	Melody Belle 57	Michael McNab	Jamie Richards, Matamata	1:22.12 (good)	Wyndspelle 59	Helena Baby 59
2018	Melody Belle 56.5	Shafiq Rusof	Jamie Richards, Matamata	1:24.59 (soft)	Hiflyer 59	Our Abbadean 57
2017	Close Up 59	Grant Cooksley	Shelley Hale, Cambridge	1:27.89 (heavy)	Aide Memoire 57	Underthemoonlight 57
2016	Kawi 59	Leith Innes	Alan Sharrock, New Plymouth	1:24.87 (soft)	El Pescado 59	Farm Boy 59
2015	Kawi 59	Leith Innes	Alan Sharrock, New Plymouth	1:22.25 (soft)	Ryan Mark 59	Ginner Hart 59
2014	I Do 57	Opie Bosson	Alan Sharrock, New Plymouth	1:24.08 (soft)	Pussy O’Reilly 57	Pure Champion 59
2013	Survived 58.5	Opie Bosson	John Bary, Hastings	1:32.78 (heavy)	Full Of Spirit 57	Final Touch 57
2012	Ocean Park 58.5	Lisa Allpress	Gary Hennessy, Matamata	1:23.79 (soft)	Xanadu 56.5	Justanexcuse 59
2011	Mufhasa 59	Samantha Spratt	Stephen McKee	1:23.12 (soft)	Jimmy Choux 58.5	Fleur de Lune 56.5
2010	Keep The Peace 56.5	James McDonald	Shaune Ritchie, Cambridge	1:26.69 (heavy)	Wall Street 59	Fritzy Boy 59
2009	Tavistock 58.5	Jason Waddell	Andrew Campbell, Opaki	1:22.09 (good)	Mufhasa 59	Sterling Prince 59
2008	Fritzy Boy 58.5	Noel Harris	Alby MacGregor, Opaki	1:24.16 (soft)	Bulginbaah 59	Prince Kaapstad 58.5
2007	Seachange 56.5	Gavin McKeon	Ralph Manning, Cambridge	1:23.30 (soft)	Cog Hill 59	J'Adane 56.5
2006	Seachange 56	Gavin McKeon	Ralph Manning, Cambridge	1:21.13 (soft)	Darci Brahma 58.5	Kristov 59
2005	Xcellent 57	Michael Coleman	Michael Moroney & Andrew Scott, Matamata	1:22.51 (good)	Miss Potential 56	Shinzig 57
2004	Starcraft 57	Leith Innes	Garry Newham, Queensland	1:22.59 (soft)	Miss Potential 56	Kalamata (Aus) 54.5
2003 (at Wanganui)	Miss Potential 56	Reese Jones	Bill Borrie	1:18.02 (1340m)	Tit For Taat 56	Rosina Lad 58
2002	Sunline 56	Greg Childs	Stephen McKee	1:22.98	Tit For Taat 56	Cent Home 58
2001	Fritz 58.5	Noel Harris	Neil Coulbeck, Leithfield	1:21.19	Cinder Bella 58	Figurante 56
2000	Cent Home 58.5	David Walker	Jim Wallace, Opaki	1:22.14	Cheiron 58	Buster Brookfield 58
1999	Hero 58.5	Mark Hills	Jim Campin & John Gudopp, Cambridge	1:21.47	Rebel 58.5	Surface 58.5
1998	Batavian 58.5	Peter Johnson	Graeme Rogerson & Keith Hawtin, Tuhikaramea	1:28.42	Tycoon Lil 58	Covered n’ Grey 54
1997	Pakaraka Star 58.5	Jim Collett	S W Gulliver, Hawera	1:28.37 (heavy)	Moss Downs 58	Adonia 58
1996	Vialli (Ire) 58.5	Michael Coleman	Dave & Paul O'Sullivan, Matamata	1:24.44	Marconee 58.5	Tripta 58.5
1995	Marconee 58.5	Damon Smith	Gary Barlow & Jeff Lynds, Newbury, Palmerston North	1:24.03	Snap 58	Solvit 56
1994	Snap 54.5	Lance O'Sullivan	Dave & Paul O'Sullivan, Matamata	1:20.32	Solvit 58.5	Veandercross 58.5
1993	Calm Harbour 58.5	Lance O'Sullivan	Noel Eales, Awapuni	1:23.68	Veandercross 58.5	Solvit 58.5
1992	Surfers Paradise 58.5	Lance O'Sullivan	Dave & Paul O'Sullivan, Matamata	1:24.11	Plume 58	Nassa Rocket 56
1991	Rough Habit 58.5	Michael Boyce	John Wheeler, New Plymouth	1:24.72	Surfers Paradise 58	Status 57
1990	Flying Luskin 58	Peter Johnson	Stephen & Trevor McKee, Takanini	1:21.03	Horlicks 56	Catering King 58.5
1989	Catering King 58.5	Lance O'Sullivan	Jim Gibbs	1:25.23	Regal City 58	Silver Mask 58
1988	Poetic Prince 57	Noel Harris	John Wheeler, New Plymouth	1:24.63	Plume d’Or Veille 58.5	Kairau Lad 58.5
1987	Field Dancer 58.5	Michael Coleman	Jim Gibbs & Roger James	1:23.4	Tipit 56	Crimesta 58.5
1986	Catering King 57	Brett McDonald	Dave Stenning	1:22.99	Kinmoss 56	Chance For Gold 58.5
1985	Shagolvin 56	E R Harrison		1:23.16	Clear Gold 58.5	Abit Leica 58.5
1984 (September)	Fothers 50	Debbie Taylor		1:24.85	Pinson 58.5	Glenside 58.5
1983	Burletta 44	Maree Lyndon	Felix Patrick Campbell, Hastings	1:25.76	Olene 56	Gee Jay 54.5
1982	Volare 54.5	Noel Harris	Malcolm Smith, Awapuni	1:26.4	Anderil 57.5	Diploma 57.5
1981	Gold Hope 53.5	Bruce Compton	Ray Verner, Takanini	1:20.9	Anderil 57.5	Hai Tai 57
1980	Coobers Queen 53.5	K Robinson	P Melville, Kaponga	1:27.13	Disraeli 57.5	Orchidra 56.5
1979	Vice Regal 57.5	Bill Skelton	Jim Campin, Cambridge	1:24.5	La Mer 56.5	Fraxy 57.5
1978	Silver Liner 56	Chris McNab	Eric Ropiha, Woodville	1:23.4	Milo 56.5	Nurioopta 57.5
1977	Copper Belt 57.5	Gary Phillips	Brian Deacon, Hawera	1:30.8	Battle Eve 56.5	Blue Blood 57.5
1976 (April)	Grey Way 57.5	Bob Skelton	E P Corby, Washdyke	1:23.4	Chrisarda 57	Syndrome 57.5

== See also ==
- Thoroughbred racing in New Zealand, includes a list of winners of all three Hawkes Bay Triple Crown races and other major NZ races
- Hawke's Bay Guineas
