= Bonneval (horse) =

Australian-bred Thoroughbred racehorse

- Sire: Makfi (GB)
- Grandsire: Dubawi
- Dam: Imposingly (Aus)
- Damsire: Zabeel
- Sex: Mare
- Foaled: 8 October 2013
- Country: New Zealand
- Colour: Bay
- Breeder: City Bloodstock Limited
- Trainer: Murray Baker & Andrew Forsman, Cambridge
- Record: 12: 7–0–1
- Earnings: NZ$1,680,595

Bonneval (foaled 8 October 2013) was a New Zealand bred and trained Thoroughbred racehorse who won three Group 1 races and three other Group races. She was awarded the title of New Zealand Horse of the Year in both the 2017 and 2018 seasons.

Bonneval was bred by City Bloodstock Limited. She was purchased for $150,000 at the 2015 National Yearling Sales Series from Westbury Stud by Terry Jarvis, Alastair Lawrence and John Rattray.

== Racing career ==
Bonneval was trained by Murray Baker and Andrew Forsman at Cambridge. She had a short racing career, but her performances included:

- 1st - October 2017 - Underwood Stakes beating Hartnell and Gailo Chop.
- 1st - September 2017 - Feehan Stakes beating Abbey Marie and Rhythm to Spare.
- 1st - April 2017 - Australian Oaks beating Perfect Rhyme and Lasqueti Spiral.
- 1st - March 2017 - New Zealand Oaks beating Devise and Savvy Dreams.
- 1st - March 2017 - Lowland Stakes (2100m Group 3) beating Savvy Dreams and Devise.
- 1st - February 2017 - Sir Tristram Fillies Classic (2000m Group 2) beating Nicoletta and Devise.
- 3rd - January 2017 - Desert Gold Stakes behind Nicoletta and Devise.

Her last race was an uncharacteristic 14th behind Boom Time in the 2017 Caulfield Cup. She suffered a suspensory ligament injury so was retired.

Bonneval dominated the 2017 New Zealand Horse of the Year Awards winning Horse of the Year, Three-Year-Old of the Year and Stayer of the Year. She also won the New Zealand Bloodstock Filly of the Year trophy. She was awarded the overall title again for the 2018 season as well as being voted the champion middle distance (1601-2200m) horse.

After retiring she was purchased by Waikato Stud for breeding. Her 2021 foal, Mary Eliza, has won 2 races in Australia.
