= Asterix (horse) =

New Zealand-bred Thoroughbred racehorse

- Sire: Tavistock
- Grandsire: Montjeu
- Dam: Mourasana
- Damsire: Shirocco
- Sex: Gelding
- Foaled: 10 November 2018
- Country: New Zealand
- Colour: Bay
- Breeder: Go Bloodstock New Zealand Ltd
- Owner: D & B Kelt, A & L Scott & Mark Greatbatch & J P Hunter
- Trainer: (1) Lance O'Sullivan & Andrew Scott (2) Chris Waller
- Record: 25:6-1-1
- Earnings: AU$1,101,546

Major wins
- New Zealand Derby (2022); Avondale Cup (2024); Japan Racing Association Plate (2026); Tattersall's Cup (2026)

Asterix (foaled 10 November 2018) is a New Zealand racehorse, notable for an upset victory in the 147th running of the New Zealand Derby before going on to win a number of other group races in New Zealand and Australia.

== Background ==
Asterix is a bay gelding by the former Cambridge Stud stallion Tavistock, who was a sire of classic winners such as:

- Tarzino Victoria Derby
- Johnny Get Angry Victoria Derby
- Tavago, Australian Derby
- Volkstok'n'barrell, Rosehill Guineas
- Werther Hong Kong Derby
- Infantry Singapore Derby.

Asterix was bred by Sir Owen Glenn's Go Bloodstock, and he was bought for NZ$450,000 at the 2020 New Zealand Bloodstock Ready to Run Sale by bloodstock agent Bruce Perry. Asterix races in the colours of the Kelt family, which had previously been carried to Derby victory by Popsy in 1993. Former New Zealand international cricketer Mark Greatbatch also shared in the ownership.

== Racing career ==
Asterix was trained during his New Zealand career by Lance O'Sullivan and Andrew Scott, who also won the 2021 New Zealand Derby with Rocket Spade. Asterix made his debut less than two months before his Derby triumph, finishing sixth in a 1400-metre race at Matamata on 12 January 2022. An eighth placing followed at Te Rapa on February 2, before Asterix stepped up to 2100 metres and recorded a maiden victory at Tauranga on February 16.

The 2022 New Zealand Derby was only two weeks after that victory and represented a massive rise in class, with Asterix among the outsiders at 45-to-one. But, ridden by Johnathan Parkes, he produced a powerful performance swooping from last to lodge his bid at the top of the home straight and sprinting clear for a comfortable victory over hot favourite La Crique.

In his next eight races after the Derby he had one win (a 1600m at Tauranga), a 3rd and a 4th. However, on 17 February 2024 ridden by Lynsey Satherley, Asterix returned to form by winning the Group 2 Avondale Cup over 2400m from Dionysus and Good Oil.

In 2025 he transferred to the stables of Chris Waller. He had eight Australian starts before he achieved a win in the $300,000 The Beauford, a listed race over 2300m at Newcastle on 15 November 2025 with Jason Collett aboard.

In April 2026 Asterix won the $250,000 Group 3 Japan Racing Association Plate over 2000m at Randwick. He followed this up the following month with a win in the $300,000 Gosford Gold Cup, a listed race over 2100m. He was ridden in both races by Jason Collett.

In June 2026 Asterix won the Group 3 Tattersall's Cup over 2400m at Eagle Farm ridden by Tim Clark.

== Pedigree ==
Pedigree of Asterix, bay gelding, 2018
Sire Tavistock (NZ) 2005	Montjeu (IRE); 1996	Sadlers Wells	Northern Dancer
Sire Tavistock (NZ) 2005	Montjeu (IRE); 1996	Sadlers Wells	Fairy Bridge
Sire Tavistock (NZ) 2005	Montjeu (IRE); 1996	Floripedes	Top Ville
Sire Tavistock (NZ) 2005	Montjeu (IRE); 1996	Floripedes	Toute Cy
Sire Tavistock (NZ) 2005	Upstage (GB); 1998	Quest for Fame	Rainbow Quest
Sire Tavistock (NZ) 2005	Upstage (GB); 1998	Quest for Fame	Aryenne
Sire Tavistock (NZ) 2005	Upstage (GB); 1998	Pedestal	High Line
Sire Tavistock (NZ) 2005	Upstage (GB); 1998	Pedestal	Mrs. Moss
Dam Mourasana (GB) 2008	Shirocco (GER); 2001	Monsun	Konigsstuhl
Dam Mourasana (GB) 2008	Shirocco (GER); 2001	Monsun	Mosella
Dam Mourasana (GB) 2008	Shirocco (GER); 2001	So Sedulous	The Minstrel
Dam Mourasana (GB) 2008	Shirocco (GER); 2001	So Sedulous	Sedulous
Dam Mourasana (GB) 2008	Mamoura (IRE); 1840	Lomond	Northern Dancer
Dam Mourasana (GB) 2008	Mamoura (IRE); 1840	Lomond	My Charmer
Dam Mourasana (GB) 2008	Mamoura (IRE); 1840	Mamouna	Vaguely Noble
Dam Mourasana (GB) 2008	Mamoura (IRE); 1840	Mamouna	Mabira

== See also ==
- 2022 New Zealand Derby
