= Johnathan Parkes =

New Zealand jockey (1988–2024)

Personal information
- Nickname: Parkesy
- Nationality: New Zealand
- Born: 1988 Whanganui, New Zealand
- Died: 18 October 2024 (aged 35)
- Occupation: Jockey
- Weight: 57.5 kg (127 lb)

Horse racing career
- Sport: Horse racing
- Career winnings: $19,950,915
- Career wins: 1043 wins, 62 black type races including 12 Group 1s

Significant horses
- Start Wondering, Julinksy Prince, Ransomed, Asterix, The Bubbles

Johnathan Parkes (1988 – 18 October 2024) was a New Zealand jockey. Over a two-decade racing career, Parkes rode over 1,000 winners who earned over $19 million AUD in prize money. Parkes had 62 black type wins, including 12 Group 1 races.

== Life and career ==
Parkes was from Whanganui. Parkes made his racing debut on 29 July 2004 aboard Harry D'akbar (NZ). He had his first win two days later on 31 July aboard Blissful Dancer (NZ). He first began riding for trainer Grant Searle in Horowhenua, later transferring to Paul Belsham to be closer to his hometown.

He later met trainer Fraser Auret who he would ride for over 600 times. The pair would later share a number of significant career successes, among them the Grade 1 Windsor Park Plate (1600m) and Grade 1 Captain Cook Stakes (1600m) aboard Julinsky Prince.

Parkes was known as a talented rider, but would struggle with weight issues throughout his career.

On 23 March 2012 at Waipukurau Parkes won all of the five races he rode in, including the Waipukurau Cup aboard Show The Beel.

In 2013, Parkes won his first Grade 1 race, the 2013 Spring Classic aboard Ransomed. In the 2013–2014 racing season, he reached second on the New Zealand jockey premiership leaderboard.

In 2018, Parkes again finished second on the New Zealand jockey premiership leaderboard with 118 wins. After riding over 100 winners during the 2018–2019 race season, Parkes began to take on fewer rides, reportedly in an effort to preserve his mental and physical health after continually wasting to maintain riding weight.

In March 2021, he rode I Wish I Win in his debut race, a win at Awapuni. In May he broke his collarbone in a fall and had to take several weeks off of racing.

In 2022, he won the 2022 New Zealand Derby aboard Asterix. During the 2022 – 2023 race season, Parkes took a six-month break from racing, relaxing and riding trackwork. Returning in April 2023, he stated his goal of riding 1,000 winners.

In May 2023, he recorded his 1,000th win aboard Fabian Hawk at Awapuni racecourse. In doing so he became the 36th jockey from New Zealand to record 1,000 race wins. Over a twenty-year racing career, he would start 8,245 times, winning 1,043 races.

Parkes made his final race on 7 September 2024 at Hastings aboard Geriatrix.

Parkes died on 18 October 2024, at the age of 35.

== Race record ==
Season	Rides	Wins	2nds	3rds	Major wins	NZ premiership ranking	Notes
2024–2025	7	0	1	1		91 *	
2023–2024	194	31	17	11	Taranaki Breeders Stakes (Town Cryer), War Decree Stakes (Burn To Shine)	25	
2022–2023	86	19	7	7	Rangitikei Cup (Justaskme), AGC Training Stakes (Justaskme), Opunake Cup (Justaskme)	43	
2021–2022	228	40	21	24	New Zealand Derby (Asterix), Marton Cup (Our Hail Mary), Mufhasa Stakes (On The Bubbles)	17	
2020–2021	389	48	44	30	Auckland Cup (Ocean Billy),Karaka Million 2YO (On The Bubbles), Manawatu Sires Produce Stakes (On The Bubbles), Sarten Memorial (Need I Say More), Wellington Guineas (Need I Say More), Eulogy Stakes (Whimsical)	12	
2019–2020	321	41	34	39	Karaka Cup (Five To Midnight), Cuddle Stakes (Tinkalicious), Feilding Gold Cup (Toms)	14	
2018–2019	601	118	78	56	New Zealand St. Leger (Sampson)	2	
2017–2018	539	78	71	53	Waikato Sprint (Start Wondering), Auckland Cup (Ladies First), Livamol Classic (Wait A Sec), Castletown Stakes (London Express)	7	
2016–2017	551	87	60	47	Railway Stakes (Start Wondering), Waikato Sprint (Start Wondering), Eight Carat Classic (Volpe Veloce), Avondale Guineas (Gingernuts), Eulogy Stakes (Volpe Veloce)	5	
2015–2016	610	60	63	69	Arrowfield Stud Plate (Julinsky Prince), Captain Cook Stakes (Julinsky Prince), Manawatu Challenge Stakes (Kawi), Stewards Handicap (El Chico)	14	
2014–2015	623	102	73	80	Taranaki Cup (Kawi)	3	
2013–2014	657	118	87	72	Livamol Classic (Ransomed), New Zealand Oaks (Miss Mossman), Anzac 1600 (Julinsky Prince), Rangitikei Gold Cup (Julinsky Prince)	2	
2012–2013	566	70	60	61	Manawatu Cup (Ransomed), Wellington Stakes (Weissmuller), Wanganui Cup (Cassini), Marton Cup (Ransomed)	10	
2011–2012	507	52	52	54	Opunake Cup (Khemosabi)	20	

- As at the time of death (October 2024)

== See also ==
- Thoroughbred racing in New Zealand
