= Jimmy Choux =

Thoroughbred racehorse (2007–2024)

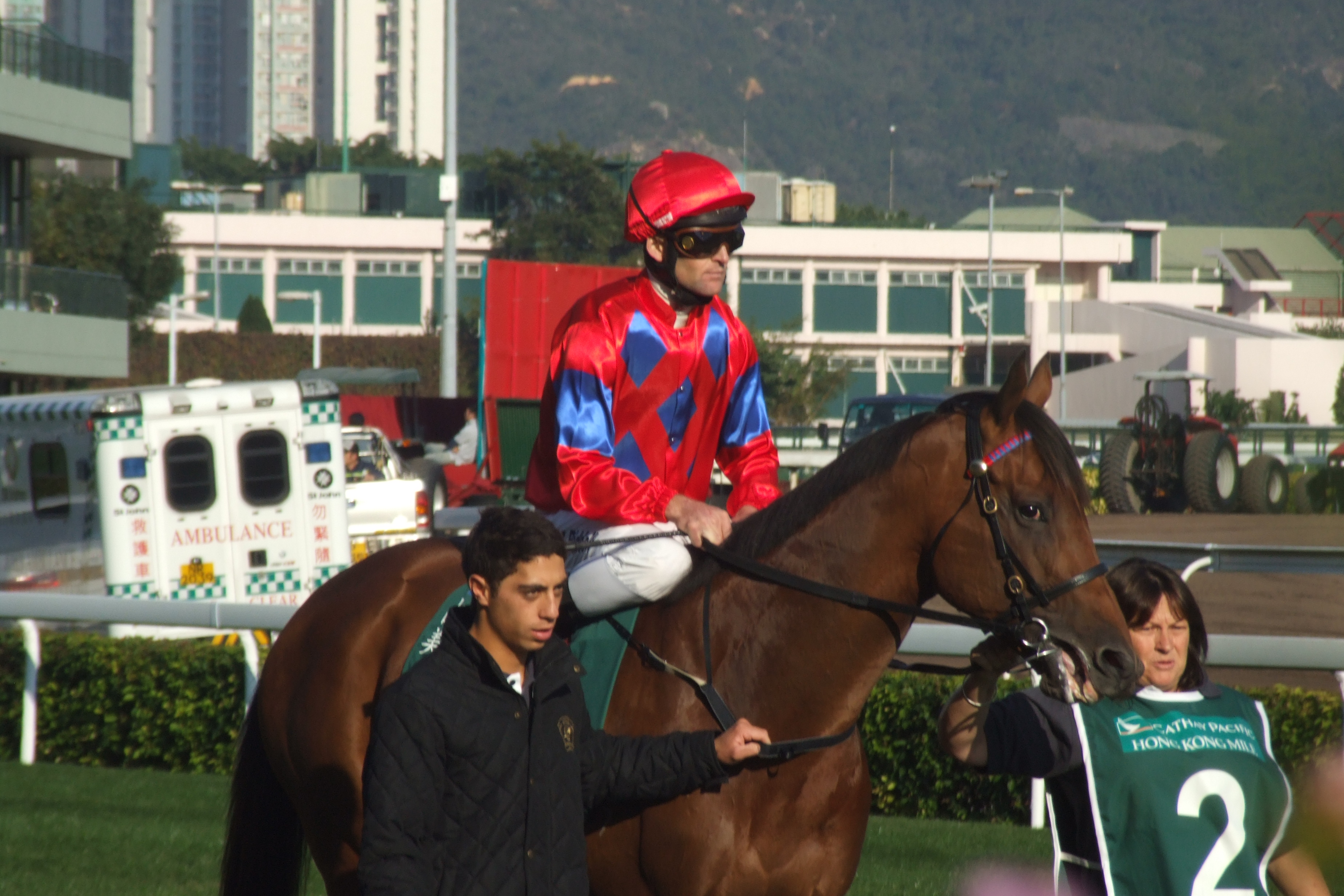
- Jimmy Choux started at Hong Kong Mile
- Sire: Thorn Park
- Grandsire: Spinning World
- Dam: Cierzo
- Damsire: Centaine
- Sex: Male
- Foaled: 10 October 2007
- Died: 22 January 2024 (aged 16)
- Country: New Zealand
- Colour: Bay
- Breeder: Chouxmaani Investments Ltd
- Owner: Chouxmaani Investments Ltd
- Trainer: John Bary
- Record: 21:12–4-2
- Earnings: $2,989,753

Major wins
- Hawke's Bay Guineas (2010); New Zealand 2000 Guineas (2010); New Zealand Derby (2011); Rosehill Guineas (2011); Windsor Park Plate (2011); Spring Classic (2011)

Awards
- New Zealand Horse of the Year (2010/11)

Jimmy Choux (10 October 2007 – 22 January 2024) was a New Zealand Thoroughbred racehorse. On 5 March 2011, he won the 136th running of the New Zealand Derby. In doing so, he became the first horse since Surfers Paradise in 1990 to win both the New Zealand 2000 Guineas and the New Zealand Derby.

== Racing career ==
A Group 2 winner and twice Group 1 placed as a two-year-old, Jimmy Choux's 2010–2011 season was among the most successful by a New Zealand three-year-old in recent history. As well as capturing the country's two biggest three-year-old races, the 2000 Guineas and the Derby, Jimmy Choux easily won the Hawke's Bay Guineas, Great Northern Guineas, Wellington Stakes and Waikato Guineas.

Some cast doubts over the prospects of Jimmy Choux in the Derby because his pedigree suggested that 2400m should be well beyond his capabilities. There was little evidence in his pedigree that Jimmy Choux would be able to run any further than a mile. But he proved his stamina, to win the Derby by two lengths.

After his NZ Derby win, Jimmy Choux traveled to Australia. His first start there resulted in a Group One victory in the Rosehill Guineas, confirming his status as one of Australasia's best three-year-olds. He started a short-priced favourite in the AJC Australian Derby but finished sixth in his final races as a three-year-old. He was awarded New Zealand Horse of the Year for the 2010/11 season.

Jimmy Choux resumed as a four-year-old, on 27 August 2011, with a second placing in the Challenge Stakes at Hastings. He then won the Windsor Park Plate and the Spring Classic, his fourth and fifth Group 1 wins, confirming his status as one of the favourites for the Cox Plate.

Jimmy Choux started second favourite in the 2011 Cox Plate. He sat just off the pace and gained a clear lead around the final turn, before being run down late by Pinker Pinker to finish second. He then ran fourth as topweight in the Emirates Stakes, before closing his campaign with a sixth placing in the Hong Kong Mile.

Jimmy Choux resumed racing in April 2012 in the Easter Handicap at Ellerslie, where he finished a creditable seventh under 61 kg. However, he was well-beaten at his next start in the Queen Elizabeth Stakes at Randwick, and was subsequently retired from racing.

== Stud record ==
Jimmy Choux was retired to Rich Hill Stud in Matamata, where he stood for a service fee of $10,000.

In 2019, Jimmy Choux was sold to Rosalee Park Stud in Serpentine, Western Australia.

On 22 January 2024, Jimmy Choux was euthanized after suffering from nose cancer. He was 16. At the time of his death he was reported as having produced 141 individual winners from his time at stud.

=== Notable progeny ===
c = colt, f = filly, g = gelding

Foaled	Name	Sex	Dam	Damsire	Major Wins
2016	Two Illicit	f	Gemini	Tale Of The Cat (USA)	2020 Royal Stakes (G2 2000m), Waikato Guineas (G2 2000m), 2021 Spring Sprint (G3 1400m Hastings), 2021 Captain Cook Stakes (G1 1600m)
2014	The Bostonian	g	Keepa Cheval	Keeper (Aus)	2019: Doomben 10,000, Kingsford-Smith Cup, 2020 Canterbury Stakes
2013	Manolo Blahniq	g	Floramour	More Than Ready (USA)	2016 Eclipse Stakes (G3 1200 2YO, Ellerslie), 2019 Chester Manifold Stakes (listed 1400m, Flemington)

== See also ==
- 2011 New Zealand Derby
- Thoroughbred racing in New Zealand
