= Xcellent =

New Zealand-bred Thoroughbred racehorse

- Sire: Pentire
- Grandsire: Be My Guest
- Dam: Excelo
- Damsire: Centro
- Sex: Gelding
- Foaled: 29 November 2001
- Country: New Zealand
- Colour: Bay
- Breeder: G F Gimblett Family Trust
- Owner: G W Breingan, G K V Holdings Ltd, M J Gatt, P A Heath, D A Nicholson & Wellington Racing Syndicate
- Trainer: Michael Moroney
- Record: 13:8-0-1
- Earnings: $1,499,950

Major wins
- New Zealand Derby (2004); Kelt Capital Stakes (2005); New Zealand Stakes (2005); Mudgway Stakes(2005)

Awards
- New Zealand Horse of the Year (2005, 2006)
- Last updated on 3 July 2007

Xcellent (foaled 29 November 2001 in New Zealand) is a thoroughbred racehorse who was trained by Michael & Paul Moroney.

He won 6 races from his first 9 career starts, including four Group Ones - The New Zealand Derby and New Zealand Stakes at Ellerslie Racecourse, and the Mudgway Stakes and Kelt Capital Stakes at Hastings. On 1 November 2005, he ran third in the Melbourne Cup, behind three-time winner Makybe Diva.

In early 2006, Xcellent damaged both front tendons and was out of action for 18 months before returning to the track in the 2007 Stradbroke Handicap and doing little on an unsuitably wet track under a large weight.

Beginning another campaign in December 2007, he remained unbeaten in New Zealand in scoring a stunning win first up in the Group 3 Sir James Fletcher Stakes over 1600m at Ellerslie against a strong field including the likes of Sir Slick and fellow Derby winner Wahid. He suffered his only defeat in New Zealand when finishing second to Sir Slick in the Group 1 Zabeel Classic at Ellerslie on Boxing Day. In January 2008, Xcellent won the Group 3 Trentham Stakes. However, he pulled up sore after that race, and had to be led back riderless to the birdcage. It was discovered he had ruptured a suspensory ligament and his retirement was announced the following day.

In the 2005-06 World Thoroughbred Racehorse Rankings: 1 August 2005 – 31 July 2006, Xcellent was ranked 18th by the International Federation of Horseracing Authorities. He was the New Zealand Horse of the Year in both the 2004–05 and 2005–06 seasons.

== See also ==
- Thoroughbred racing in New Zealand
