= David Walsh (jockey) =

New Zealand jockey

Personal information
- Full name: David Michael Walsh
- Born: 1959 (age 66–67) Ashburton, New Zealand
- Occupation: Jockey

Horse racing career
- Sport: Horse racing

Significant horses
- Courier Bay, Lomondy, Solvit

David Walsh (born October 1959) is a former jockey in Thoroughbred racing in New Zealand. He is notable for having won the New Zealand jockey's premiership twice and riding over 2,500 winners in New Zealand and overseas.

== Racing career ==
David Walsh was born in Ashburton. His father Michael was a shearer and freezing worker. David was encouraged by his grandfather Mac McEwen to be a jockey.

David Walsh was apprenticed to Jim Lalor and had his first race-day start at Riccarton Park Racecourse during New Zealand Cup week in 1974 and his first winner, Three Sevens in December of that year. He rode three other wins in his first season.

Walsh's total of over 2,500 victories in his four decade career includes races in Australia, Japan, Singapore, Malaysia and Mauritius. He has the second highest total of New Zealand winners behind Chris Johnson. Walsh previously held the New Zealand record total having overtaken Lance O'Sullivan's total on 27 April 2014 when he rode Willy Duggan to win at Blenheim. There are only eight jockeys who have ridden 2,000 New Zealand winners:

- Johnson
- Walsh
- Lance O'Sullivan
- Noel Harris
- David Peake
- Bill Skelton
- Michael Coleman
- Opie Bosson the latest to reach the threshold in December 2023

Walsh's most notable win was the 1994 Cox Plate with Solvit.

Walsh retired in 2017.

== Notable victories ==
The following are some of the major races Walsh has won.

Year	Race	Horse	Trainer(s)
1986	Telegraph Handicap	Tanalyse	D Grubb
1986	Adelaide Cup	Lomondy	Noel Eales
1986	Brisbane Cup	Marlon	Bruce Marsh
1986	Caulfield Cup	Lomondy	Noel Eales
1987	Telegraph Handicap	Courier Bay	G A White
1988	Telegraph Handicap	Courier Bay	G A White
1994	Cox Plate	Solvit	Moira Murdoch
2002	New Zealand Thoroughbred Breeders Stakes	Saint Cecile	Nigel Auret

== See also ==
- Lisa Allpress
- Opie Bosson
- Noel Harris
- Chris Johnson
- Lance O'Sullivan
- Thoroughbred racing in New Zealand
