= Seachange (horse) =

New Zealand-bred Thoroughbred racehorse

- Sire: Cape Cross
- Grandsire: Green Desert
- Dam: Just Cruising
- Damsire: Broad Reach
- Sex: Mare
- Foaled: 14 November 2002
- Country: New Zealand
- Colour: Brown
- Breeder: Karreman Bloodstock Ltd
- Owner: Karreman Bloodstock Ltd
- Trainer: Graeme Sanders
- Record: 25:14-4-2
- Earnings: $1,572,421 (excluding earnings for Jabbel el Hatta)

Major wins
- New Zealand 1000 Guineas (2005); Mudgway Stakes (2006/07); Stoneybridge Stakes (2006/07); Mannerism Stakes (2007); Telegraph Handicap (2007); Waikato Draught Sprint (2007)

Awards
- 2006/07 NZ Horse of the Year; 2007/08 NZ Horse of the Year; 2008 World Thoroughbred Rankings: Best 4yo+ Turf Mare over 1000–1300m
- Last updated on March 24, 2008

Seachange (foaled 14 November 2002) is a top New Zealand thoroughbred racehorse. She won a record seven Group I races in New Zealand. Her regular rider in New Zealand was Gavin McKeon.

== Racing career ==
Seachange began racing in September 2005, as a 3yo, and won her first start at Paeroa by half a length. She won four additional races during that campaign, including the Group I New Zealand 1000 Guineas, and remained undefeated.

In July 2006, Seachange won at Waikato. In her next start, second up at Waikato, she suffered her first defeat, being beaten by less than a length by Bulginbaah and Don't Ya Lovett. She continued to Hastings to contest the Hastings Triple Crown and enter a highly anticipated clash with the million-dollar colt Darci Brahma. Seachange won her second Group I, the Mudgway Stakes, with Darci Brahma closing fast for 2nd, a length behind. The two met again in the Group I Stoneybridge Stakes, with Seachange and Darci Brahma battling neck and neck down the straight. Seachange prevailed by a nose, with commentator Tony Lee declaring "What a horse race!". Seachange moved on to the final race of the Hastings Triple Crown: the Group I Kelt Capital Stakes. Despite her best efforts, she was beaten by less than a length by Legs and Kerry O'Reilly. Seachange pressed forward with an Australian campaign, finishing 2nd and 15th in the Myer Classic and Emirates Stakes, respectively.

Seachange participated two months later in the Group I Telegraph Handicap at Trentham. This time, Darci Brahma won by 1.5 lengths. Seachange then went on a second Australian Campaign, with a win in the Group III Mannerism Stakes, a 2nd in the Group I Futurity Stakes, and a 5th in the Group I CF Orr Stakes.

In August 2007, Seachange participated in the Foxbridge Plate at Te Rapa, finishing 5th. Despite this, she defended her titles in the Group I Mudgway Stakes and Group I Stoneybridge Stakes. She went into her second Kelt Capital Stakes as favourite. She finished 4th in a four-way finish, being beaten by only a neck by the winner, Princess Coup. She had only one other start during this campaign, the Group I Captain Cook Stakes, where she finished a distant 3.5 lengths 2nd to Dorabella. The defeat was attributed to exhaustion.

Seachange returned refreshed for the Group I Telegraph Handicap at Trentham in January 2008, the race she lost the previous year. This time, however, she prevailed. With the top weight of 58.5 kg, she was given reign at the 200 m mark and won by 3 1/2 lengths in a time of 1.06.66, the second-fastest time for a race over six furlongs. She backed up in the Group I Waikato Draught Sprint at Te Rapa, which was her test run for a trip to the 2008 Dubai World Cup Meeting. Despite winning by only half a length, it was decided she would make the trip to Dubai to contest the Million Dubai Duty Free.

Her race prior to the Dubai Duty Free was the US$250,000 Jabel Hatta-Nayef at Nad al Sheba on the 6 March. With both the wide draw and the 58 kg she carried, she only managed to finish 6th. This pleased her trainers, though, and they were confident heading into the Dubai Duty Free.

Seachange finished 6th in the Dubai Duty Free, just under 2.5 lengths from the winner, Jay Peg. She then raced in England. Top New Zealand trainer Graeme Sanders took over the training for this campaign, after original trainer Ralph Manning dropped out.

Seachange's first start in England was in the Golden Jubilee Stakes at Royal Ascot over 6 furlongs, where she finished 12th. She stepped up to 8 furlongs for her final career start, the Falmouth Stakes at Newmarket, where she finished 4th.

Seachange ran a final recorded race on 9 July, 2008, before returning to New Zealand in August. On 7 October 2008, it was revealed she had a life-saving operation on a twisted bowel.

== Breeding career ==
Seachange has had a number of offspring:

- 2009: Thornton by Zabeel
- 2011: Divan by Zabeel, placed at Group 3 level
- 2014: Sea Goddess by Darci Brahma
- 2015 : Away Cruising by Darci Brahma
- 2016: Pelican by Fastnet Rock
- 2017: World Cruise by Tavistock
- 2019: Rising Tide by Darci Brahma
- 2020: foal by Savabeel (AUS) exported

Seachange stopped breeding after 2021.
