= New Zealand Thoroughbred Horse of the Year =

New Zealand horse racing award

The New Zealand Thoroughbred Horse of the Year title is awarded to the horse who is voted to be the best performed thoroughbred horse during the New Zealand racing season. This award is open to all thoroughbred horses racing within New Zealand, regardless of age and sex, and includes overseas performances.

== Background ==
There are two main horse racing codes in New Zealand:

- thoroughbred racing in which the horses are ridden by a jockey, and
- standardbred or harness racing, in which the horses are driven by a person sitting behind the horse in a lightweight cart called a sulky. The standardbred code has a New Zealand harness Horse of the Year award.

== Horses of the Year ==
The following thoroughbred horses have been awarded the title.

Year/Season	Horse	Age/sex	Breeding	Trainer(s)
2025-2026	Well Written	3yo f	Written Tycoon - Mozzie Monster	Stephen Marsh
2024-2025	El Vencedor	6yo g	Shocking - Strictly Maternal	Stephen Marsh
2023-2024	Imperatiz	5yo m	I Am Invincible - Berimbau	Mark Walker
2022-2023	Sharp 'N' Smart	4yo g	Redwood (GB) - Queen Margaret (NZ)	Team Rogerson, Tuhikaramea
2021-2022	Probabeel	5yo m	Savabeel - Far Fetched	Jamie Richards
2020-2021	Probabeel	4yo m	Savabeel - Far Fetched	Jamie Richards
2019-2020	Melody Belle (NZ)	5yo m	Commands - Meleka Belle	Jamie Richards
2018-2019	Melody Belle (NZ)	4yo m	Commands - Meleka Belle	Jamie Richards
2017-2018	Bonneval (NZ)	4yo m	Makfi (GB) - Imposingly (AUS)	Murray Baker & Andrew Forsman, Cambridge
2016-2017	Bonneval (NZ)	3yo f	Makfi (GB) - Imposingly (AUS)	Murray Baker & Andrew Forsman, Cambridge
2015-2016	Mongolian Khan (AUS)	4yo h	Holy Roman Emperor (IRE) - Centafit (NZ)	Murray Baker & Andrew Forsman, Cambridge
2014-2015	Mongolian Khan (AUS)	3yo c	Holy Roman Emperor (IRE) - Centafit (NZ)	Murray Baker & Andrew Forsman, Cambridge
2013-2014	Dundeel / It's a Dundeel (NZ)	4yo h	High Chaparral (IRE) - Stareel (NZ)	Murray Baker
2012-2013	Ocean Park (NZ)	4yo h	Thorn Park (AUS) - Sayyida (NZ)	Gary Hennessy
2011-2012	Mufhasa (NZ)	7yo g	Pentire (GB) - Sheila Cheval (NZ)	Stephen McKee
2010-2011	Jimmy Choux (NZ)	3yo c	Thorn Park (AUS) - Cierzo (NZ)	John Bary
2009-2010	Vosne Romanee (NZ)	7yo g	Electronic Zone (USA) - Madison Avenue (NZ)	Jeff Lynds
2008-2009	Mufhasa (NZ)	4yo g	Pentire (GB) - Sheila Cheval (NZ)	Stephen McKee
2007-2008	Seachange (NZ)	5yo m	Cape Cross (IRE) - Just Cruising (AUS)	Ralph Manning, Cambridge
2006-2007	Seachange (NZ)	4yo m	Cape Cross (IRE) - Just Cruising (AUS)	Ralph Manning, Cambridge
2005-2006	Xcellent (NZ)	4yo g	Pentire (GB) - Excelo	Mike Moroney & Andrew Scott, Matamata
2004-2005	Xcellent (NZ)	3yo g	Pentire (GB) - Excelo	Mike Moroney & Andrew Scott, Matamata
2003-2004	King’s Chapel (AUS)	3yo c	King of Kings (IRE) - Lower Chapel (GB)	Colin Jillings & Richard Yuill
2002-2003	Tit For Taat (NZ)	5yo g	Faltaat (USA) - Miss Kiwitea (NZ)	Anne Herbert
2001-2002	Sunline (NZ)	6yo m	Desert Sun (GB) - Songline (NZ)	Stephen & Trevor McKee, Takanini
2000-2001	Sunline (NZ)	5yo m	Desert Sun (GB) - Songline (NZ)	Stephen & Trevor McKee, Takanini
1999-2000	Sunline (NZ)	4yo m	Desert Sun (GB) - Songline (NZ)	Stephen & Trevor McKee, Takanini
1998-1999	Sunline (NZ)	3yo f	Desert Sun (GB) - Songline (NZ)	Stephen & Trevor McKee, Takanini

== See also ==
- New Zealand Racing Hall of Fame
- Thoroughbred racing in New Zealand
- Harness racing in New Zealand
- New Zealand Trotting Hall of Fame
- List of leading Thoroughbred racehorses
