= Starcraft (horse) =

New Zealand-bred Thoroughbred racehorse

- Racing silks of Starcraft
- Sire: Soviet Star (USA)
- Grandsire: Nureyev
- Dam: Flying Floozie
- Damsire: Pompeii Court (USA)
- Sex: Stallion
- Foaled: 21 October 2000
- Died: 3 November 2022 (aged 22)
- Country: New Zealand
- Colour: Chestnut
- Breeder: Garry J. Chittick
- Owner: The Australian Syndicate
- Trainer: Garry Newham (Australia); Luca Cumani (Europe)
- Record: 22: 11-3-4
- Earnings: £1,289,010 (A$3,081,215)

Major wins
- The Debonair (2004); Tulloch Stakes (2004); Australian Derby (2004); Chipping Norton Stakes (2004); Mudgway Stakes (2004); Stoneybridge Stakes (2004); Queen Elizabeth II Stakes (2005); Prix du Moulin de Longchamp (2005)

Awards
- Australian Champion Three Year Old (2004)

Honours
- New Zealand Racing Hall of Fame
- Last updated on 26 August 2010

Starcraft (21 October 2000 – 3 November 2022) was a New Zealand-bred Thoroughbred racehorse who came to international attention when he won the Group 1 Queen Elizabeth II Stakes at Newmarket in England in September 2005. He was the winner of five Group One (G1) races in four countries, the 2004 Australian Champion Three Year Old and also the 2005 World Champion Older Turf Miler.

== Breeding ==
He was a chestnut stallion, standing 16.2 hands (66 inches, 168 cm) high, foaled at Garry and Mark Chittick's Waikato Stud in New Zealand. Starcraft was by Soviet Star (USA), from Flying Floozie (Pompeii Court (USA) - Lucky Heiress). He was half-brother to Forum Floozie (by Danasinga (AUS), a listed race winner of $478,530). Starcraft was auctioned as a yearling and sold for only NZ$80,000 to a syndicate of Australians, headed by Australian Paul Makin.

== Racing record ==
Starcraft progressed from a second placing in a two-year-old maiden race in Queensland to winning the Group 1 Australian Derby in Sydney, Australia as a three-year-old. Other victories included the Group 1 Chipping Norton Stakes, also in Sydney. As a four-year-old he won the Group 2 Stoneybridge Stakes and Group 1 Mudgway Stakes in New Zealand before being beaten into third place in the 2004 Cox Plate after starting one of the favourites. Despite this setback the owners continued with their plans on worldwide campaign for Starcraft.

=== Overseas ===
Starcraft was taken to Great Britain on 4 February 2005 where he was trained by Italian Luca Cumani and was ridden by French jockey Christophe Lemaire.

In Europe, he surprised many Northern Hemisphere race fans with his dominance when he won the 1,600 metre Prix du Moulin at Longchamp, Paris. He proved this was no fluke, and that he was the dominant miler in Europe, when winning the G1 Queen Elizabeth II Stakes which was held at Newmarket because Ascot was being refurbished at the time. This was his 11th win from 22 race starts and his fifth G1 success.

The horse started in the $4 million Breeders' Cup Classic event at Belmont Park in the United States in 2005. The owners had to pay a fee of $800,000 to enter him in this race, which was considered a huge gamble because it was a dirt track and the horse had always previously raced on grass. He drew the outside barrier, got away to a slow start and finished 7th in a 13 horse field.

== Stud record ==
Starcraft retired to stud in 2006. He served his first group of mares to Northern Hemisphere time at Cheveley Park Stud at Newmarket, England. He was exported from England on 7 August 2006 and stood his first Southern Hemisphere season at Arrowfield Stud in the Hunter Valley, New South Wales.

He is the sire of over 250 live foals that have now won over $1,187,752, including:

- Star Witness – (won G1 2010 Blue Diamond Stakes, G1 2010 Coolmore Stud Stakes)
- We Can Say It Now - (won G1 2010 Levin Classic, G1 2010 Captain Cook Stakes)

In 2010 66 Starcraft yearlings were sold for an average of $99,288. His advertised 2011 service fee is $44,000.

Starcraft died on 3 November 2022 after a short illness.
