= Howden Insurance Mile =

- Class: Group I
- Location: Hastings Racecourse; Hawke's Bay, New Zealand
- Race type: Thoroughbred - Flat racing
- Website: Hawke's Bay Racing

Race information
- Distance: 1600m (1 mile)
- Surface: Turf
- Track: Left-handed
- Qualification: Three-year-olds and up
- Weight: Weight for Age
- Purse: NZ$400,000 (2026)

The Howden Insurance Mile is a New Zealand Thoroughbred horse race run at Hastings Racecourse in Hawke's Bay. The race, which is registered as the Horlicks Plate, became known as the Howden Insurance Mile in 2025 and has been previously known as:

- the Arrowfield Stud Plate. In 2022 the race sponsor and naming rights changed from the Windsor Park Stud to the Arrowfield Stud.
- the Windsor Park Plate.
- the Stoney Bridge Stakes from 2004 to 2008.
- the Glenmorgan Generous Stakes, in 2003, when it was raced at Otaki.
- the Glenmorgan Hawkes Bay Challenge Stakes.

It is run over a distance of 1600m in late September or early October. It was a Group 3 race until 2001 and Group 2 until 2004.

It is the second of the Hawkes Bay Triple Crown of Group 1 weight-for-age races. The others are:

- the 1400m Challenge Stakes currently known as the Proisir Plate, and
- the 2040m Livamol Classic.

Other major races run during the carnival are:

- the Gold Trail Stakes for three-year-old fillies at Group 3 level. This race marks the beginning of the New Zealand Filly of the Year series.
- the Hawke's Bay Guineas.

In the COVID-19 affected 2020/21 season the Windsor Park Plate was raced on 3 October 2020. The same meeting held the Hawke's Bay Guineas whereas the Hawke's Bay Breeders Gold Trail Stakes was held a fortnight earlier on September 19 along with the Tarzino Trophy.

In 2022 the scheduled meeting at Hastings was cancelled and the race was moved to the following week and raced at Matamata. The 2024 and 2025 editions were also held in the Waikato due to the Hastings racecourse being closed for reconstruction after a horse slipped in a race in September 2024.

== Recent results ==
Year	Group	Winner	Jockey	Trainer	Time	Second	Third
2026 (Hastings)	1	Waitak 59	Craig Grylls	Lance O'Sullivan & Andrew Scott	1:34.51 (soft)	Tuxedo 59	She's A Dealer 57
2025 (Te Rapa)	1	Waitak 59	Craig Grylls	Lance O'Sullivan & Andrew Scott	1:39.25 (heavy)	La Crique 57	Ladies Man 59
2024 (Matamata)	1	One Bold Cat 59	Ryan Elliot	Robbie Patterson	1:35.49 (good)	Skew Wiff 57	Matscot 59
2023 (Hastings)	1	Mustang Valley 57	Joe Doyle	Andrew Forsman	1:40.52 (heavy)	Malt Time 57	Callsign Mav 59
2022 (Matamata)	1	La Crique 56.5	Craig Grylls	Simon & Katrina Alexander, Matamata	1:35.32 (soft)	Mustang Valley 56.5	Prise De Fer 59
2021	1	Callsign Mav 59	Jonathan Riddell	John Bary, Hastings	1:36.28 (good)	Prise De Fer 59	Gino Severini 59
2020	1	Melody Belle 57	Troy Harris	Jamie Richards, Matamata	1:33.88 (good)	Avantage 57	Callsign Mav 58.5
2019	1	Melody Belle 57	Opie Bosson	Jamie Richards, Matamata	1:34.17 (good)	Sultan of Swing 59	Mongolian Marshall 59
2018	1	Melody Belle 56.5	Shafiq Rusof	Jamie Richards, Matamata	1:35.39 (dead)	Savvy Coup 56.5	Wyndspelle 59
2017	1	Gingernuts 58.5	Opie Bosson	Stephen Autridge & Jamie Richards, Matamata	1:40.15 (slow)	Close Up 59	Kawi 59
2016	1	Kawi 59	Leith Innes	Alan Sharrock, New Plymouth	1:35.52 (dead)	Mime 56.5	Rasa Lila 57
2015 (Trentham)	1	Julinsky Prince 59	Johnathan Parkes	Fraser Auret, Marton	1:37.81 (dead)	Allez Eagle 59	Platinum Witness 56.5
2014	1	Pure Champion 59	Craig Grylls	Lance O'Sullivan & Andrew Scott, Matamata	1:34.28 (dead)	I Do 57	Soriano 57
2013	1	Xanadu 57	Michael Coleman	Ken & Bev Kelso, Matamata	1:35.60 (good)	Mufhasa 59	Nashville 59
2012	1	Mufhasa 59	Samantha Spratt	Stephen McKee	1:34.88 (good)	Fleur de Lune 57	Xanadu 56.5
2011	1	Jimmy Choux 58.5	Jonathan Riddell	John Bary, Hastings	1:34.05 (good)	Mufhasa 59	Hold It Harvey 59
2010	1	Wall Street 59	Michael Coleman	Jeff Lynds, Awapuni	1:41.24 (slow)	Fritzy Boy 59	Keep The Peace 56.6
2009	1	Daffodil 56.5	Hayden Tinsley	Kevin Gray, Awapuni	1:39.78 (slow)	Sarrera 59	Sterling Prince 59
2008	1	Princess Coup 56.5	Opie Bosson	Mark Walker, Matamata	1:36.71 (dead)	Nom du Jeu 58.5	Fritzy Boy 58.5
2007	1	Seachange 56.5	Gavin McKeon	Ralph Manning, Cambridge	1:35.89 (good)	Sir Slick 59	Princess Coup 56
2006	1	Seachange 56	Gavin McKeon	Ralph Manning, Cambridge	1:34.37 (good)	Darci Brahma 58.5	Hurrah 59
2005	1	Miss Potential 56	Reese Jones	Bill Borrie	1:35.73 (good)	Irish Rover 58.5	Magnetism 57
2004	2	Starcraft 57	Glen Boss	Garry Newnham, Queensland	1:36.31 (firm)	Miss Potential 56	Irish Rover 58.5
2003 (raced at Otaki)	2	Irish Rover 58	David Walker	Eddie Carson	1:36.1 (easy)	Miss Potential 56	Tit For Taat 56
2002	2	Hello Dolly 56.5	Andrew Calder	W G (Bill) Wills, Cambridge	1:38.06 (soft)	Hail 56	Cent Home 58
2001	3	Hello Dolly 56	Hayden Tinsley	W G (Bill) Wills, Cambridge	1:35.91 (soft)	Cinder Bella 56	Hill Of Grace 56
2000	3	The Message 58.5	Linda Ballantyne	John Ralph	1:35.09 (good)	Cinder Bella 58	Aerosmith 56

== See also ==
A table listing winners of all 3 of the Hawkes Bay Triple Crown is included in Thoroughbred racing in New Zealand, along with tables showing the recent winners of other major New Zealand races.
