= Hawke's Bay Guineas =

- Class: Group II
- Location: Hastings Racecourse; Hawke's Bay, New Zealand
- Race type: Thoroughbred - Flat racing
- Website: Hawke's Bay Racing

Race information
- Distance: 1,400 metres (7 furlongs)
- Surface: Turf
- Track: Left-handed
- Qualification: Three-year-olds
- Weight: set weights
- Purse: NZ$175,000 (2026)

The Hawke's Bay Guineas is a major Thoroughbred horse race in New Zealand for three-year-old horses.

In 2003 the stake was boosted to $100,000 and the race was moved to the first Saturday in October, meaning that it was run on the same day as the Livamol Classic. In later years it has been on the same day as the Howden Insurance Mile.

== Notable winners ==
The race serves as a guide to the New Zealand 2000 Guineas. In past years, winners of this race have also competed in major races across New Zealand and Australia, including:

- Alamosa, the 2008 Toorak Handicap winner.
- Balmerino, winner of the 1975 New Zealand 2000 Guineas & New Zealand Derby and 1976 Rawson Stakes, Tulloch Stakes, P J O'Shea Stakes & Brisbane Cup and 1977 Air New Zealand Stakes, Awapuni Gold Cup & Ormond Memorial. Also won the 1977 Valdoe Stakes.
- Darci Brahma, the winner of the 2005 T.J. Smith Stakes
- Jimmy Choux, the 2011 Rosehill Guineas winner and 2011 Cox Plate runner-up.
- Mr Tiz, winner of the 1989, 1990 & 1991 Railway Stakes, 1989 & 1990 Telegraph Handicap, 1991 Waikato Sprint and 1991 The Galaxy
- Sacred Falls, the winner of the 2013 and 2014 Doncaster Handicap and 2014 George Main Stakes.
- Turn Me Loose, winner of the 2015 Seymour Cup, Crystal Mile & Emirates Stakes and the 2016 Futurity Stakes.
- Veandercross, winner of the 1993 Ranvet Stakes and Australian Cup

In 2005, the race was run in the national record time for 1400 metres of 1:19.97 as Darci Brahma and Dr Green fought out the finish.

== Race results ==
•• The distance changed from 1600m to 1400m in 1987

Year	Winner	Jockey	Trainer(s)	Time	2nd place	3rd place
2026 (Hastings)	Old Fashiioned 57	Kelly Myers	Bill Thurlow	1:23.29 (soft)	Asturia 55	Raymond 57
2025 (at Te Rapa)	Magic Carpet 57	Jonathan Riddell	Stephen Marsh	1:26.53 (heavy)	Quondo 57	Faultless 57
2024 (at Matamata)	Savaglee 57	Samantha Spratt	Pam Gerard	1:23.08 Good	So Naive 57	Captured By Love 55
2023	Lantern Way 57	Jonathan Riddell	Lisa Latta, Awapuni	1:27.19 Heavy	Solidify 57	Burn To Shine 57
2022 (at Matamata)	Pier 57	Michael McNab	Darren & Briar Weatherley, Matamata	1:24.42 Soft	Mr Mojo Risin' 57	Channel Surfer 57
2021	Mana Nui 56.5	Vinnie Colgan	Chad Ormsby	1:24.01 Dead	Wakari 56.5	Drum Major 56.5
2020	Aegon 56.5	Leith Innes	Murray Baker & Andrew Forsman, Cambridge	1:22.94 Good	Bourbonaire 56.5	Moana 54.5
2019	Catalyst 56.5	Troy Harris	Clayton Chipperfield, Te Awamutu	1:22.65 Fast	Callsign Mav 56.5	Aotea Lad 56.5
2018	Madison County 56.5	Matt Cameron	Murray Baker & Andrew Forsman, Cambridge	1:22.70 Dead	Melt 54.5	King Louis 56.5
2017	Hard Merchandize 56.5	Cameron Lammas	Gary Vile, Awapuni	1:25.17 Dead	Bostonian 56.5	Jimmy Lincoln 56.5
2016	Mongolian Falcon 56.5	Leith Innes	Donna Logan & Chris Gibbs, Ruakaka	1:26.45 Soft	Jon Snow 56.5	Heroic Valour 56.5
2015	Amarula 56.5	Shaun McKay (A)	Peter & Jacob McKay, Matamata	1:22.01 Good	Scrutinize 56.5	Battle Time 56.5
2014	Turn Me Loose 56.5	Opie Bosson	Murray Baker & Andrew Forsman, Cambridge	1:21.31 Good	Prince Mambo 56.5	Longchamp 56.5
2013	Sir Andrew 56.5	Mark Du Plessis	Richard Otto, Te Awamutu	1:22.95 Dead	All Decked Out 56.5	Fascination Street 54.5
2012	Sacred Falls 56.5	Leith Innes	Tony Pike & Mark Donoghue, Cambridge	1:22.13 Good	Southern Lord 56.5	Silverdale 56.5
2011	Antonio Lombardo 54.5	Samantha Spratt	Peter McKay, Matamata	1:22.65 Good	Prestigious Me 54.5	Ginner Hart 56
2010	Jimmy Choux 56	Jonathan Riddell	John Bary, Hastings	1:21.54 Good	Icepin 56	Maradona 56
2009	Keyora 56	Hayden Tinsley	John Wheeler, New Plymouth	1:23.38 Dead	St Germaine 54.5	Aspinal 55
2008	Tell A Tale 56	Troy Harris	Mark Walker, Matamata	1:21.34 Good	Fully Fledged 56	Altered Image 56
2007	Alamosa 56	Hayden Tinsley	Peter McKay, Matamata	1:20.86 Good	El Cuento 56	Fritzy Boy 56
2006	Jokers Wild 56	Michael Coleman	Mike Moroney & Dean Melton, Matamata	1:22.07 Dead	Alberto 56	Pinot Grigio 56
2005	Darci Brahma 56	Michael Walker	Mark Walker, Matamata	1:19.97 Good	Dr Green 56	Captain Kurt 56
2004	Shastri 55.5	Lisa Cropp	John Sargent, Matamata	1:21.20 Easy	Keeninsky 55.5	Manten 55.5
2003	Stardane 56	Rhys McLeod	Brian Jenkins, Cambridge	1:20.70 Firm	Penitentiary 56	Eftee One 56
2002	Bunker 56	Michael Walker	Stephen & Trevor McKee, Takanini	1:24.32	Jack The Stripper 56	Crown Control 56
2001	Vinaka 56	Leith Innes	Jim Gibbs, Matamata	1:24.10 Easy	The Player 56	Rocky Point 56
2000	Singalong 54	Noel Harris	Stephen Autridge, Matamata	1:22.50 Firm	Fore Stay 54	Vulpix 56
1999	Buzz Lightyear 56	Tony Allan	Robert Prescott, Te Awamutu	1:26.08 Soft	Emerald Dream 54	Galahad 56
1998	So Casual 55	Vinnie Colgan	Ross Taylor, Tauranga	1:21.40 Firm	Danske 55	Mr Jif 55
1997	Quality Kingdom 55	Michael Coleman	Grant Searle, Levin	1:23.13	Old Tawny 55	Thriller 55
1996	Batavian 55	Peter Tims	Graeme Rogerson & Keith Hawtin, Tuhikaramea	1:22.11 Easy	Our Silver Prince 55	The Red Express 55
1995	Petanque 55	Lee Rutherford	Trevor & Stephen McKee, Takanini	1:24.34	Straight Clip 55	Furama Nights 55
1994	Vedodara 53	Bruce Herd	John Sargent, Awapuni	1:20.44 Firm	Asahi 55	Avedon 55
1993	Al Akbar 55	Gary Grylls	Chris Wood, Cambridge	1:21.06 Firm	Ashalars Prince 55	Sea Captain 55
1992	Lady Madonna 53	Phillip Mercer	Grant Searle, Levin	1:26.02 Firm	Red Baron 53	The Aged Rocker 55.5
1991	Veandercross 55	Jim Walker	Chris Turner, Wanganui	1:22.01	Overwhelmed 55	Solvit 55
1990	Tripita 55	David Walsh	Jeff Lynds, Awapuni	1:22.00	Full Time 55	Be Happy 55
1989	Finnegan Fox 55	Larry Cassidy	Bryan Hayter, Hawera	1:27.28 Heavy	Red Arc 55	Sheriff 55
1988	Sir Jugular 55	Maurice Campbell	Maurice Campbell, Wanganui	1:23.91	The Phantom 55	Crown Symbol 55
1987••	Mr Tiz 55	Lance O'Sullivan	Dave & Paul O'Sullivan, Matamata	1:22.58	Festal 55	Dalpic 55
1986	Sir Zeus 55	Garry Phillips	John Wheeler, New Plymouth	1:46:34 Slow	Auto Air 55	Tough Guy 55
1985	Avon’s Lad 55	Brian York	J W McGreal	1:36:98	Mystic Monarch 55	Anteaus 55
1984	Kingdom Bay 55.5	Peter Fearon	Jack Taylor, Stratford	1:45:15 Heavy	Great Chevalier 55.5	Norfolk King 55.5
1983	Beechcraft 55.5	Tony Williams	Kevin Crampton, Takanini	1:36:51	Fine Offer 55.5	McGettigan 55.5
1982	Nicolove 55.5	Warwick Robinson	Colin McColl	1:39:34	Captain Supreme 55.5	Big Spender 55.5
1981	Bisette 55.5	Gary Phillips	Trevor McKee, Takanini	1:37:32 Good	Moments Of Glory 55.5	Loughanure 55.5
1980	Prince Majestic 55.5	David Peake	Ray Verner, Takanini	1:37:39 Good	Whittaker 55.5	Sir Bart 55.5
1979	Tallifer 55.5	Garry Phillips	John Mason, Tokoroa	1:37:48	Mighty King 55.5	Coober’s Queen 53
1978	Koiro Trelay 55.5	M Gillies	Eric Temperton, Awapuni	1:40.0	Holy Toledo 55.5	Fearless 55.5
1977	Crest Star 55.5	K Reggett	I J Tucker, Takanini	1:46.2 Slow	Disraeli 55.5	Top Quality 55.5
1976	Zermatt 55.5	Warwick Robinson	Mrs M Bull, Cambridge	1:38.4	Mayo Mellay 55.5	Stringbarg 55.5
1975	Balmerino 55.5	Maurice Campbell	Brian J Smith, Cambridge	1:37.6	March Legend 55.5	Nippy Jim 55.5
1974 (Awapuni)	Flash Affair 55.5	Bruce A Compton	K B Simmons, Te Aroha	1:43		
1973	Oopik 55.5	Peter D Johnson	Dave O'Sullivan, Matamata			
1972	Black Rod	Des Harris	C A Bowry, Otaki			
1971	Master John	Bill Skelton	M Bartz			
1970	Dare Devil	G D Alexander	I Alton, Cambridge			
1969	Piko	Garry Edge	I Robinson, Matangi			
1968	Royal Tudor	Bruce Marsh	J Paul, Hastings			
1967	Bompa	Bill Skelton	W G Ivil, Tauherenikau			
1966	Game	Bruce Marsh	K H Quinlivan, Hastings			
1965	Devastation	A T Jones	K Thomson, Otaki			
1964	Rio	A T Jones	K Couper, Hastings			

== See also ==
- Thoroughbred racing in New Zealand
- Desert Gold Stakes
- Karaka Million
- Levin Classic
- New Zealand 1000 Guineas
- New Zealand 2000 Guineas
- New Zealand Derby
- New Zealand Oaks
- Proisir Plate
