= Larry Cassidy (jockey) =

New Zealand and Australian jockey

Personal information
- Born: 1970 (age 55–56) Wellington, New Zealand
- Occupation: Jockey

Horse racing career
- Sport: Horse racing
- Relatives: Jimmy Cassidy (brother)

Larry Cassidy (born 1970) is an accomplished thoroughbred racing jockey who is notable for winning over 40 Group 1 races as well as three consecutive Sydney jockey premierships in 1998, 1999 and 2000.

Cassidy's brother Jimmy Cassidy, who is seven years older than Larry, was an established jockey in New Zealand and then Australia who won the Melbourne Cup on Kiwi in 1983. Another brother, Ricky, was also a jockey.

Cassidy also started his career in New Zealand, leaving his home aged 12 to do an apprenticeship with Brent Beattie at Palmerston North, and later Bruce Marsh at Woodville. After moving to Australia to ride and establishing himself as a senior jockey, Cassidy embarked on stints in Hong Kong, Macau and Singapore. Returning to Australia, Cassidy moved to Brisbane and predominantly rode at Queensland racecourses such as Doomben, Eagle Farm and the Sunshine Coast. He was sometimes known as "Last Race Larry" for his happy habit of winning the last race of the day.

His last race-day ride was on November 25, 2023. In December 2024 Larry announced his retirement, stating: “After more than a year, two surgeries and numerous, painful physio sessions, I have made the difficult decision to retire,”

== Notable wins ==
Some of Cassidy's major wins were:

- 1989 Telegraph Handicap on Festal (trained by Bruce Marsh) dead heating with Mr Tiz and Lance O'Sullivan at Trentham Racecourse
- 1989 New Zealand 2000 Guineas on Finnegan Fox, trained by Brian Hayter
- 1992 Telegraph Handicap on Morar, trained by Dave and Paul O'Sullivan
- 1995 Australian Derby on Ivory's Irish, trained by Bart Cummings
- 1997 Doncaster Handicap on Secret Savings, trained by Gai Waterhouse
- 1997 Sydney Cup on Linesman, trained by Gai Waterhouse
- 1998 Flight Stakes on Sunline, trained by Trevor and Stephen McKee
- 1998 VRC Derby on Arena, trained by John Hawkes
- 1999 New Zealand Oaks on Let's Sgor, trained by Murray Baker
- 1999 Warwick Stakes on Sunline, trained by Trevor and Stephen McKee
- 1999 Doncaster Handicap on Sunline, trained by Trevor and Stephen McKee
- 2000 Brisbane Cup on Yippyio, trained by Allan Denham
- 2000 Queensland Derby on Freemanson, trained by John Hawkes
- 2001 Rosehill Guineas on Sale Of The Century, trained by John Hawkes
- 2001 Champagne Classic (BRC) on Dolce Veloce, trained by Clarry Conners
- 2002 Rosehill Guineas on Carnegie Express, trained by Gai Waterhouse
- 2002 Singapore Derby on Smart Bet, trained by Mohd Yusof
- 2003 Singapore Derby on Lead To Victory, trained by Charlie Read
- 2004 Australian Oaks on Wild Iris, trained by Guy Walter
- 2005 Brisbane Cup on Portland Singa, trained by N Mcburney
- 2005 Epsom Handicap on Desert War, trained by Gai Waterhouse.
- 2009 Queensland Derby on Court Ruler, trained by John Wheeler
- 2009 Champagne Classic (BRC) on Funtantes, trained by Robert Heathcote
- 2011 Victory Stakes on Buffering, trained by Robert Heathcote
- 2015 Champagne Classic (BRC) on Blueberry Hill, trained by Liam Birchley
- 2023 Ken Russell Memorial Classic on Russian Alliance, trained by Kevin Kemp.

Cassidy's resume also includes a win on the champion, Winx, in the Sunshine Coast Guineas on 16 May 2015. This was to be the first win of a 33-race unbeaten sequence for Winx, although the horse was ridden by Hugh Bowman and James McDonald (once) from then on.
