= Levin Classic =

- Class: Group 1, Group 2 (2025-)
- Location: Trentham Racecourse, Wellington, (2014-); Otaki Racecourse (1991-2012); Levin Racecourse (1981-1990)
- Inaugurated: 1981
- Race type: Thoroughbred - Flat racing
- Website: Levin Racing Club

Race information
- Distance: 1600m (1 mile), 1400m (2025-)
- Surface: Turf
- Track: Left-handed
- Qualification: Three-year-olds
- Weight: Set-Weights
- Purse: NZ$400,000 (2026)

The Group One Levin Classic - formerly the Bayer Classic - is one of the premier races for three-year-old thoroughbreds in New Zealand.

== History ==
The race, first run under the name Levin Turf Classic, was originally run at Levin Racecourse until that facility was closed as a racing venue in 1990 and the race was transferred to nearby Ōtaki.

For more than a decade the race was sponsored by Bayer, and known as the Bayer Classic.

For much of its history, the race was run at Levin and then Ōtaki on the last Friday in November.

Concern began to grow in the 2000s about the race's close proximity to the New Zealand 2000 Guineas and New Zealand 1000 Guineas, both run in the second week in November. The three Group 1 3-year-old races over a mile in the New Zealand racing season were all run within the space of three weeks, leading to an inevitable dilution of quality of fields. From 2014 the Levin Classic was moved to Trentham Racecourse in Wellington and initially run as part of the Wellington Cup Carnival in January conducted by the Wellington Racing Club. In 2022 and 2023 the race was held in March but it was returned to January in 2024.

== Notable winners ==
Among the most famous winners are:

- Bonecrusher, winner of the 1985 New Zealand Derby and 1986 Cox Plate
- Imperatriz, winner of the 2022 New Zealand Thoroughbred Breeders Stakes and 2023 Railway Stakes
- O'Reilly, winner of the 1997 Telegraph Handicap
- Our Flight, winner of the 1982 New Zealand 1000 Guineas and New Zealand Derby
- Tit For Taat, winner of the 2000 New Zealand 2000 Guineas, 2003 Waikato Sprint and Sir Byrne Hart Stakes
- Veandercross, winner of the 1991 New Zealand 2000 Guineas, 1992 Canterbury Guineas and 1993 Australian Cup
- Wahid, winner of the 2006 New Zealand Derby

== Race results ==
Year	Winner	Jockey	Trainer(s)	Time	Second place	Third
2026	La Dorada 55	Craig Grylls	Mark Walker & Sam Bergerson	1:24.40 (soft)	Swiss Prince 57	Argo 57
2025	Savaglee 57	Samantha Spratt	Pam Gerard	1:23.22 (good, 1400m)	Kitty Flash 55	Tardelli 57
2024	Quintessa 55	Opie Bosson	Mark Walker & Sam Bergerson	1:35.76 (good)	Zabmanzor 57	Impendabelle 55
2023	Romancing The Moon 55	Kozzi Asano	Mark Walker	1:37.13 (soft)	Skew Wiff 55	Luella Cristina 55
2022	Imperatriz 54.5	Michael McNab	Jamie Richards	1:36.43 (dead)	On The Bubbles 56.5	I Wish I Win 56.5
2021	Bonham 54.5	Lisa Allpress	Johno Benner & Hollie Wynyard, Otaki	1:37.67 (good)	Brando 56.5	Wild Moose 56.5
2020	Travelling Light 54.5	Samantha Collett	Ben Foote, Cambridge	1:36.71 (good)	Harlech 56.5	Riodini 56.5
2019	Madison County 56.5	Matthew Cameron	Murray Baker & Andrew Forsman, Cambridge	1:35.89 (good)	Hypnos 56.5	Vernanme 56.5
2018	Age Of Fire 56.5	Opie Bosson	Stephen Autridge & Jamie Richards, Matamata	1:36.63 (soft)	Belle Du Nord 54.5	Savvy Coup 54.5
2017	Hall Of Fame 56.5	Opie Bosson	Stephen Autridge & Jamie Richards, Matamata	1:35.54 (good)	Saville Row 56.5	Jon Snow 56.5
2016	Dukedom 56.5	Lisa Allpress	Steven Cole	1:36.96 (good)	Son Of Maher 56.5	Rangipo 56.5
2015	Gaultier 56.5	Michael Coleman	Danica Guy, Matamata	1:36.62 (good)	Sardaaj 54.5	Huka Eagle 56.5
2014	Recite 54.5	Mark Du Plessis	John Bary, Hastings	1:36.10 (firm)	Franzac 56.5	Aspen 56.5
2013	No race held					
2012	Southern Lord 56.5	Kelly Myers	Alan Tait, Matamata	1:34.63 (good)	Le Choix 56.5	Soriano 55
2011	Distill 56.5	Robert Hannam	Roydon Bergerson, Awapuni	1:35.97 (good)	Randall 56.5	Antonio Lombardo 56.5
2010	We Can Say It Now 54.5	Leith Innes	Murray & Bjorn Baker, Cambridge	1:34.27 (good)	Blinding 54.5	Lady Kipling 54.5
2009	Eileen Dubh 55	Jonathan Riddell	Francis Finnegan, Woodville	1:35.43 (good)	St Germaine 54.5	Green Supreme 56
2008	Altered Image 56	Michael Coleman	Michael & Paul Moroney, Matamata	1:32.50 (good)	Spontaneous 56	Izonit 56
2007	Keepa Cruisin 54.5	Leith Innes	Stephen McKee, Ardmore	1:34.85 (good)	Run Like Al 56	Satinka 54.5
2006	Porotene Gem 54.5	David Walker	Kevin Gray, Copper Belt Lodge	1:40.10 (soft)	Jokers Wild 56	Figueres 56
2005	Wahid 56	Hayden Tinsley	Allan Sharrock, New Plymouth	1:36.18 (dead)	Shikoba 53.5	Izzat 56
2004	Ambitious Owner 55.5	Leith Innes	Murray Baker, Cambridge	1:34.77 (Good)	Fiscal Madness 55.5	Magnetism 55.5
2003	Russian Pearl 56	Hayden Tinsley	Bruce & Stephen Marsh, Woodville	1:34.96 (soft)	Taatletail 53.5	King’s Chapel 56
2002	Bunker 56	Opie Bosson	Trevor & Stephen McKee, Takanini	1:37.14 (soft)	Dane choice 56	Cheerine Kid 56
2001	Final Destination 53.5	Gary Grylls	Vannessa Hillis, Matamata	1:34.9 (good)	Shinnecock 54	Armondo 56
2000	Tit For Taat 56	Hayden Tinsley	Wayne Herbert	1:35.11 (good)	Star Satire 56	Sir Clive 54
1999	Buzz Lightyear 56	Opie Bosson	Robert Priscott, Te Awamutu	1:35.28	Domero 56	Greatthings Happen 56
1998	Tobruk 56	Leith Innes	Graham Richardson, Matamata	1:37.67 (soft)	With Drawn 56	Kaapeon 56
1997	Love De Tor 53	Greg Childs	Michael Moroney, Matamata	1:33.69 (good)	Foxwood 53	Quality Kingdom 53
1996	O'Reilly 55.5	Lance O'Sullivan	Dave & Paul O'Sullivan, Matamata	1:35.74	High Return 55.5	Rebel 55.5
1995	Prussian Blue 55.5	Shane Udy	Davina Waddell, Pukekohe	1:34.97 (good)	Anemos 56	Super Crest 53
1994	Avedon 55.5	Darryl Bradley	Felix Patrick Campbell, Awapuni	1:34.81	Starcent 53	Allegro 55.5
1993	Al Akbar 55.5	Gary Grylls	Chris Wood, Cambridge	1:43.97 (heavy)	Western Red 55.5	Facing The Music 53
1992	Nimue 53	Lance O'Sullivan	Dave & Paul O'Sullivan, Matamata	1:33.66	Kaaptive Edition 55.5	Hula Strike 55.5
1991	Veandercross 55.5	Jim Walker	Chris Turner, New Plymouth	1:34.35	Overwhelmed 55.5	Captain Cook 55.5
1990	Eagle Eye 55.5	Noel Harris	Murray Baker, Woodville	1:39.64	Sir Alberton 55.5	Play On 55.5
1989	Phillipa Rush 53	Lance O'Sullivan	Jim Campin, Cambridge	1:36.20	Pumpernickel 55.5	Status 55.5
1988	Krona 55.5	Peter Tims	Roger McGlade, Taupo	1:35.53 (good)	Straight Order 55.5	Kate’s Myth 53
1987	Young Indian 55.5	Peter Tims	Norm Morgan, Ruakaka	1:35.75 (good)	Sound Belt 55.5	Candide 53
1986	The Bishop 55.5	Maree Lyndon	Don Couchman, Hawera	1:36.78	Margarella 53	Precocious Lad 55.5
1985	Bonecrusher 55.5	Jim Cassidy	Frank Ritchie, Takanini	1:36.90	French Polish 53	Seadreamer 53
1984	Princess Dram 53	Maree Lyndon	Neil Bradley, Hawera	1:35.90	Avana 53	Kingdom Bay 55.5
1983	Burletta 53	Jim Cassidy	Felix Patrick Campbell, Hastings	1:36.0	Eastern Bay 53	Prince Ariba 55.5
1982	Our Flight 53	Maurice Campbell	Errol Skelton, Levin	1:36.2 (good)	Red Tempo 55.5	Clansman 55.5
1981	Altitude 55.5	Stephen Autridge	Bill Ford, Matamata	1:36.00 (good)	Noble Heights 53	Volare 55.5

== See also ==
- Recent winners of major NZ races for 3 year olds
- Otaki-Maori Weight for Age
- Trentham Stakes
- Thorndon Mile
- Karaka Million
- Hawke's Bay Guineas
- New Zealand Derby
- New Zealand Oaks
- New Zealand 1000 Guineas
- New Zealand 2000 Guineas
