= New Zealand 2000 Guineas =

- Class: Group I
- Location: Riccarton Park; Christchurch, New Zealand
- Inaugurated: 1973
- Race type: Thoroughbred – Flat racing
- Website: Riccarton Park

Race information
- Distance: 1600m (1 mile)
- Surface: Turf
- Track: Left-handed
- Qualification: Three-year-olds
- Weight: Set-Weights
- Purse: NZ$700,000 (2026)

The New Zealand 2000 Guineas is a Group One set-weight Thoroughbred horse race for three-year-old horses run over a distance of 1600 metres at Riccarton Park in Christchurch, New Zealand.

== Christchurch New Zealand cup week ==
The New Zealand 2000 Guineas was previously held on the first day of Christchurch's famous New Zealand Cup Week. In 2025 it was held on the following Saturday on the same day as the New Zealand Cup.

For thoroughbred horses the week also features:

- the New Zealand 1000 Guineas for 3 year old fillies (the Saturday prior to the New Zealand 2000 Guineas)
- the TAB Mile (formerly the Coupland's Bakeries Mile) on the Wednesday
- the Stewards Handicap sprint (also on New Zealand Cup day).

Christchurch Cup week includes premier standardbred meetings at Addington raceway including:

- the New Zealand Trotting Cup for pacers on the Tuesday
- the Dominion Handicap for trotters on the Tuesday (in prior years it was on the Friday)
- the New Zealand Free For All for pacers on the Friday.

Up until 2025 there was also greyhound racing on the Thursday, including the following Group 1 races:

- the New Zealand Galaxy - C5f 295m ($40,000 stake)
- the New Zealand Greyhound Cup - C5f 525m ($100,000)
- the New Zealand Stayers Cup - C2df 732m ($40,000)

Greyhound racing was banned by the New Zealand Government with effect from 1 August 2026.

The week also features the Canterbury A&P Show

== History ==
Until 1973, both the New Zealand Oaks and the New Zealand Derby were run at Riccarton. When those races were moved to Trentham Racecourse and Ellerslie Racecourse respectively, Riccarton was awarded two new classic races, the New Zealand 1000 Guineas and the New Zealand 2000 Guineas over 1600m. These races are based on the 1000 Guineas Stakes and 2000 Guineas Stakes, run at Newmarket in late April or early May.

Both races quickly established themselves on the New Zealand racing calendar.

== Notable winners ==
Among the best recent winners of the 2000 Guineas are:

- Turn Me Loose, winner of the 2015 Crystal Mile, Seymour Cup & Emirates Stakes and 2016 Futurity Stakes.
- Jimmy Choux, winner of the 2011 New Zealand Derby, Rosehill Guineas, Windsor Park Plate and Spring Classic.
- Katie Lee, winner of the 2009 New Zealand 1000 Guineas.
- Darci Brahma, winner of the 2005 The T J Smith, Hawke's Bay Guineas & Otaki-Maori Weight for Age, 2007 Waikato Sprint & Telegraph Handicap.
- King's Chapel, winner of the 2004 Telegraph Handicap, Otaki-Maori Weight for Age & Gold Coast Guineas.
- Veandercross, winner of the 1992 Mackinnon Stakes & Canterbury Guineas and 1993 Queen Elizabeth Stakes, Ranvet Stakes & Australian Cup.
- Sacred Falls, winner of the 2013 and 2014 Doncaster Handicap and the 2014 George Main Stakes.

Jockey Opie Bosson has won the race a record eight times with:

- Danske (1998).
- Buzz Lightyear (1999).
- King's Chapel (2003).
- Katie Lee (2009).
- Atlante (2013).
- Turn Me Loose (2014).
- Embellish (2017).
- Noverre (2021).

=== 1000 and 2000 Guineas ===
Katie Lee is the only horse to win both of these races, having done so in 2009 ridden by Opie Bosson and trained by Graeme & Debbie Rogerson for owners Sir Patrick & Lady Hogan.

In 1997 Tycoon Lil won the 1000 Guineas and 4 days later was 2nd behind Foxwood in the 2000 Guineas.

In 2014 Platinum Witness was 4th in the 2000 Guineas behind Turn Me Loose and then a week later won the 1000 Guineas.

=== Hawke's Bay Guineas winners ===
Horses who have won the Hawke's Bay Guineas that have gone on to win the New Zealand 2000 Guineas include:

- Savaglee (2024)
- Pier (2022)
- Aegon (2020)
- Catalyst (2019)
- Madison County (2018)
- Turn Me Loose (2014)
- Sacred Falls (2012)

== Race results ==
Year	Winner	Breeding	Jockey	Trainer	Owner(s)	Time	Second	Third
2026	Kumara Straight	Hellbent (Aus) - Snow Secret	Logan Bates	Shaune Ritchie & Colm Murray	Malone Thoroughbred Ltd & Shaune Ritchie	1:36.56 (soft)	Rip Tide	Coniston
2025	Romanoff	Belardo - Tsarina Belle	Bruno Queiroz	Pam Gerard	Wally Campbell, Adrian Mathieson, Natalie Walker et al	1:40.38 (heavy)	Affirmative Action	Shoma
2024	Savaglee	Savabeel (Aus) - Glee	Samantha Spratt	Pam Gerard	The Oaks Stud	1:33.86 (good)	Love Poem	Domain Ace
2023	Crocetti	Zacinto (GB) - Gracehill	Warren Kennedy	Danny Walker & Aaron Tata	Daniel Nakhle	1:34.59 (good)	Talisker	To Catch A Thief
2022	Pier	Proisir (Aus) - La Vitesse	Michael McNab	Darryn & Briar Weatherley, Matamata	B W P Wright, D R & Mrs L M Weatherley & Mr Aziz Kheir	1:36.72 (good)	Desert Lightning	Prowess
2021	Noverre	Savabeel (Aus) - Magic Dancer	Opie Bosson	Jamie Richards, Matamata	Te Akau 2020 Stallion Breeding Syndicate (Mgr: Karyn Fenton-Ellis MNZM)	1:35.11 (good)	Meritable	Field Of Gold
2020	Aegon	Sacred Falls (NZ) - Toss Up	Leith Innes	Murray Baker & Andrew Forsman, Cambridge	A C Forsman & Zame Partnership	1:35.96 (good)	Bourbonaire	Marine
2019	Catalyst	Darci Brahma - Evana	Troy Harris	Clayton Chipperfield, Te Awamutu	D Karreman	1:36.07 (good)	Harlech	Sherwood Forest
2018	Madison County	Pins (Aus) - Red Delicious	Matt Cameron	Murray Baker & Andrew Forsman, Cambridge	China Horse Club	1:37.73 (heavy)	Dawn Patrol	Sir Nate
2017	Embellish	Savabeel (Aus) - Bling	Opie Bosson	Stephen Autridge & Jamie Richards, Matamata	Te Akau 2016 Breeding Syndicate (Mgr: K W Fenton-Ellis MNZM)	1:34.80 (good)	Age Of Fire	Ever Loyal
2016	Ugo Foscolo	Zacinto (GB) - Bequests	Michael Coleman	Stephen Marsh, Cambridge	JML Bloodstock (Mgr: L Petagna), T Muollo, P W O'Rourke, Ms R Phillippo, T I Bawden & KJ Hickman	1:33.81 (good)	Saville Row	Heroic Valour
2015	Xtravagant	Pentire (GB) - Axiom	Matt Cameron	Stephen Autridge & Jamie Richards, Matamata	Te Akau 2014 Breeding Syndicate	1:33.59 (good)	Battle Time	Serena Miss
2014	Turn Me Loose	Iffraaj (GB) - Indomitable	Opie Bosson	Murray Baker & Andrew Forsman, Cambridge	S Brown, L de Souza, T Hartley, J Lark, D Painter, J Robertson & P Vawdrey	1:35.00 (good)	Rockfast	Prince Mambo
2013	Atlante	Fastnet Rock (Aus) - Readyforcatherine	Opie Bosson	Murray Baker, Cambridge	Ms. R. Phillippo	1:36.47 (good)	Chambord	Gobi Ranger
2012	Sacred Falls	O'Reilly (NZ) - Iguazu's Girl	Leith Innes	Tony Pike & Mark Donoghue, Cambridge	Raffles Dancers Ltd	1:34.95 (good)	Oasis Rose	Warhorse
2011	Rock 'n' Pop	Fastnet Rock (Aus) - Popsy	Jamie Bullard	Jason Bridgman, Matamata	Te Akau Rock 'n' Pop Syndicate	1:35.62 (firm)	Anabandana	Dollario
2010	Jimmy Choux	Thorn Park (Aus) - Cierzo	Jonathan Riddell	John Bary, Hastings	Chouxmaani Investments Ltd.	1:39.46 (heavy)	He's Remarkable	Twilight Savings
2009	Katie Lee	Pins (Aus) - Miss Jessie Jay	Opie Bosson	Graeme & Debbie Rogerson	Sir Patrick & Lady Hogan	1:34.91 (good)	Military Move	Clapton
2008	Tell A Tale	Tale Of The Cat (USA) - Cheeky Veronika	Troy Harris	Mark Walker, Matamata	Fortuna (No 5) Syndicate	1:34.28 (good)	Il Quello Veloce	Minstrel Court
2007	The Pooka	Tobougg (Ire) - The Banchee	Lisa Cropp	John Wheeler, New Plymouth	P Holland, Markwood Lodge, G D Rutherford, J R Wheeler	1:35.18 (good)	Alamosa	Rios
2006	Magic Cape	Magic Albert (Aus) - Cape City	Patrick Holmes	Shaune Ritchie, Cambridge	PC Alexandre Mrs C A & M H Arnott, G I Barnett, D F Emerson, W A Pellett, G G Peterson, Mrs A P Ritchie, Miss C M Webster & M G Wills	1:38.08 (soft)	Jokers Wild	Princess Coup
2005	Darci Brahma	Danehill (USA) - Grand Echezeaux	Michael Walker	Mark Walker, Matamata	Te Akau Stud	1:37.35 (good)	Captain Kurt	Crusoe
2004	Clean Sweep	End Sweep (USA) - Eidercrown (Can)	Michael Coleman	Michael Moroney & Andrew Scott, Matamata	MP Brown et al.	1:34.92 (good)	Ambitious Owner	The Raj
2003	King's Chapel	King Of Kings (Ire) - Lower Chapel (GB)	Opie Bosson	Mark Walker, Matamata	Tauranga Syndicate	1:36.34 (firm)	Sarah Vee	Kainui Belle
2002	Hustler	Al Akbar (Aus) - Flush	Noel Harris	Paul Harris, Rangiora	PW Jolly & JP Reid	1:35.64 (soft)	The Jewel	Bois
2001	Master Belt	Masterclass (USA) - Lady Di	Brian Hibberd	Kevin Gray, Copper Belt Lodge	K & KA Gray	1:34.61 (good)	San Luis	Leica Guv
2000	Tit For Taat	Faltaat (USA) - Miss Kiwitea	Hayden Tinsley	Wayne & Anne Herbert	RI & WS Scott	1:37.37 (soft)	Sir Clive	Danamite
1999	Buzz Lightyear	Gold Brose (Aus) - Excitable Kid (USA)	Opie Bosson	Robert Priscott, Te Awamutu	TW, MT & CE Jarvis	1:35.09 (firm)	Thee Old Dragon	Ad Alta
1998	Danske	Danehill (USA) - Our Tristalight	Opie Bosson	Paul O'Sullivan, Matamata	January Syndicate	1:34.41 (good)	So Casual	Power And Fame
1997	Foxwood	Centaine (Aus) - Delia's Choice	Bruce Herd	Roger James, Cambridge	Mrs HA & Mrs JM Hannan	1:34.24 (good)	Tycoon Lil	Trust In Ben
1996	Hero	Deputy Governor (USA) - Domino	Catherine Treymane	Jim Campin, Cambridge	JW Campin	1:34.79 (firm)	Batavian	Bubble
1995	Be Boss	Le Belvedere (USA) - Champagne On Ice	Robert Vance	Jenny Vance	K W Lo & Mrs Jenny Vance	1:36.02 (good)	Peer Gynt	Magic McGinty
1994	Avedon	Famous Star (GB) - Harper's Bazaar	Darryl Bradley	Patrick Campbell, Awapuni	Mrs M H & R C Spotswood	1:36.71 (firm)	Asahi	Vedodara
1993	Facing The Music	Sackford (USA) - Composing	Chris Johnson	Mike Ingram	Mike B Ingram	1:35.69 (firm)	Makarpura Star	Shatin Heights
1992	Hulastrike	Straight Strike (USA) - She Might Hula (USA)	Lance O'Sullivan	Dave & Paul O'Sullivan, Matamata	Futurity Bloodstock Ltd	1:34.14 (good)	Mr Richfield	Rhythm
1991	Veandercross	Crossways (GB) - Lavender (NZ)	Jim Walker	Chris Turner, New Plymouth	B & C B Turner	1:35.78 (soft)	Captain Cook	Mafioso
1990	Surfers Paradise	Crested Wave (USA) - Lady Aythorpe	Darrel Lang	Dave & Paul O'Sullivan, Matamata	F Cheung, K Chong, G Fong & J D Smith	1:34.12 (good)	Eagle Eye	Full Time
1989	Finnegan Fox	Silver Blaze (USA) - Gold Shine	Larry Cassidy	Brian Hayter, Hawera	B Hayter	1:36.20 (good)	Centime	Castletown
1988	Krona	Icelandic (Ire) - Daley's Point (Aus)	Peter Tims	Roger McGlade, Taupo	H R & Mrs H McGlade	1:34.43 (good)	Testament	Straight Order
1987	Weston Lea	Sea Anchor (Ire) - Bruree	Tony Allan	Laurie Laxon, Cambridge	Haunui Farm Ltd & E N Peacocke	1:35.54 (good)	Westminster	Satisfy
1986	Steely Dan	Standaan (Fra) - Miss Jubilee	Gary Grylls	Tony Gillies	W T Callahan, R L Kennedy, J C Parkes & A J J Parkinson	1:36.85 (soft)	Mickey's Town	Arctic Wolf
1985	Random Chance	Three Legs (GB) - Libby	Shane Anderton	Brian Anderton, Wingatui	G W & Mrs L J McDonnell	1:35.48 (good)	Field Dancer	Bonecrusher
1984	Kingdom Bay	Otehi Bay (Aus) - Golden Praise	Noel Harris	Jack Taylor, Stratford	D & Mrs D M Whittington	1:34.64 (fast)	Governor's Bay	Our Buddy
1983	Gaffa	My Friend Paul (USA) - Kara Sea	Grant L Cooksley	David Kerr, Riccarton	D M Kerr	1:35.42 (firm)	Lacka Reason	Tanalyse
1982	Clansman	Aythorpe (Ire) - Ruth's Beau	Ally Robinson	David Kerr, Riccarton	G D Cameron	1:38.84 (firm)	Our Flight	Freewheeling
1981	Altitude	Magnesia (USA) - High Trick	Stephen Autridge	Bill Ford, Matamata	N B Hunt	1:36.05 (firm)	Dig In	Row Of Waves
1980	Sir Avon	Avon Valley (GB) - Ballometes	Bruce Compton	JE & JW Winder, Cambridge	J S Nuttall & J E Winder	1:41.69 (soft)	Amyl	King Kaka
1979	Little Brown Jug	Godavari (Ire) - Pease	Alberto L (Tito) Poblete	Peter Jones, Riccarton	Barney Ballin	1:41.56 (soft)	Top Castle	Mighty King
1978	Teddy Doon	Rapier II (GB) - Smokey City	R Franklin	Graeme Rogerson, Te Rapa	I W Allen	1:38.7 (firm)	Lejano	Holy Toledo
1977	Uncle Remus	Bandmaster II (Ire) - Tusitana	Robert Vance	Colin Jillings, Takanini	K F Clotworthy & Mrs G M Donaldson	1:35.6 (firm)	Braless	Greek Magic
1976	Vice Regal	Bismark II (GB) - Kind Regards	Garry Edge	Jim Campin, Cambridge	E W Cameron & J W Campin	1:36.6		
1975	Balmerino	Trictrac (Fra) - Dulcie	Maurice Campbell	Brian Smith, Cambridge	Ralph K Stuart	1:37.4 (firm)	March Legend	Nurlootpa
1974	Persuasian	My Heart	J R Dowling	Kevin Old, Matamata	N B Hunt	1:36.6		
1973	Furys Order	Indian Order (GB) - Our Fury	Des Harris	Wally McEwan, Hawera	L H Bridgeman	1:37 (firm)	Iechyd	Pakistan Flight

== See also ==
- Recent winners of major races for 3 year olds
