= 2000 Melbourne Cup =

- Melbourne Cup
- Location: Flemington Racecourse; Melbourne, Australia
- Date: 7 November 2000
- Winning horse: Brew
- Jockey: Kerrin McEvoy
- Trainer: Michael Moroney
- Surface: Grass
- Attendance: 121,015

Second Coming 300 to go lead by a length, Brew cutting him down, further out Yippyo with a run. Second Coming through and then came Yippyo. It's Brew going to the lead with a 150 left to go in the Cup, Brew two lengths in front now he's drawing clear from Yippyo and Brew down to the post, Brew first two lengths to Yippyo photo third between Second Coming and Kappstad Way.

— Commentator Dan Milecki describes the climax of the race

The 2000 Melbourne Cup was the 140th running of the Melbourne Cup, a prestigious Australian Thoroughbred horse race. The race, run over 3,200 metres (1.988 mi), was held on 6 November 2000 at Melbourne's Flemington Racecourse.

It was won by Brew, trained by Michael Moroney and ridden by Kerrin McEvoy.

== Field ==
This is a list of horses which ran in the 2000 Melbourne Cup.

Place	Number	Horse	Trainer	Jockey
1st	24	Brew (NZ)	Michael Moroney (NZ)	Kerrin McEvoy
2nd	12	Yippyio	Allan Denham	Darren Beadman
3rd	7	Second Coming (NZ)	Michael Moroney (NZ)	Michael Coleman
4th	9	Kaapstad Way (NZ)	Chris Wood (NZ)	Damien Oliver
5th	3	Arctic Owl (GB)	James Fanshawe (GB)	David Harrison
6th	5	Freemason	John Hawkes	Larry Cassidy
7th	22	Celestial Show	L. Morton	Lenny Beasley
8th	15	Pasta Express	Paul Cave	John Marshall
9th	16	Skybeau (NZ)	Len Smith	Dwayne Dunn
10th	17	Hill Of Grace (NZ)	Robert Priscott (NZ)	Glen Boss
11th	4	Diatribe	George Hanlon	Jim Cassidy
12th	18	Citra's Prince (NZ)	Cliff Brown	Craig Williams
13th	11	The Hind (NZ)	Peter Hayes	Stephen Baster
14th	23	Maguire (NZ)	John Collins (NZ)	Luke Currie
15th	1	Enzelli (IRE)	John Oxx (IRE)	Greg Hall
16th	13	Bohemiath	Robert Smerdon	Darren Gauci
17th	6	Lightning Arrow (USA)	Saeed bin Suroor (UAE)	Frankie Dettori
18th	14	Our Unicorn (NZ)	Colin Alderson	Matthew Gatt
19th	20	Mr Nelson	Russell Cameron	Jason Patton
20th	8	Coco Cabana (NZ)	Gai Waterhouse	Chris Munce
21st	2	Far Cry (IRE)	Martin Pipe (GB)	Kevin Darley
22nd	10	Maridpour (IRE)	Michael Moroney (NZ)	Greg Childs
SCR	~~19~~	~~Majestic Avenue~~	~~Tony Noonan~~	
SCR	~~21~~	~~Pravda (NZ)~~	~~Paul O'Sullivan (NZ)~~	
