= Surfers Paradise (horse) =

New Zealand-bred Thoroughbred racehorse

- Sire: Crested Wave
- Grandsire: Crozier
- Dam: Lady Aythorpe
- Damsire: Aythorpe
- Sex: Gelding
- Foaled: 1987
- Country: New Zealand
- Colour: Brown
- Breeder: K Chong, G Fong & W Kwok
- Owner: F Cheung, K Chong, G Fong & J Smith
- Trainer: Dave & Paul O'Sullivan
- Record: 47: 17-5-0 (in Australia & New Zealand)
- Earnings: $2,411,839

Major wins
- New Zealand 2000 Guineas (1990); New Zealand Derby (1990); New Zealand Stakes (1991); Rosehill Guineas (1991); W S Cox Plate (1991)
- Last updated on 3 July 2007

Surfers Paradise (14 October 1987 - c.1999) was a New Zealand Thoroughbred racehorse who is best remembered for winning the Cox Plate in 1991. By Crested Wave, Surfers Paradise was named after Queensland's iconic beachside strip.

At two and three, he won 10 of his 13 starts, including the New Zealand 2000 Guineas, the New Zealand Derby, the Air New Zealand Stakes, and the Rosehill Guineas, but finished sixth, as 10/9 favourite (approximately $2.10), in the AJC Derby when attempting to win his ninth race in a row.

At four, Surfers Paradise mixed his form in the early part of the spring, with unplaced runs on wet tracks interspersed with seconds to Rough Habit in the Mudgway Stakes and Castletown in the Kelt Capital Stakes.

As a result, Surfers Paradise was an outsider, at 14/1, for his Australian reappearance in the Cox Plate. Entering Moonee Valley's short home straight, an audible roar breaks out from the crowd as Super Impose raced to the lead, and died away to silence as Surfers Paradise takes over midway down the straight.

The trainer of the runner-up, Lee Freedman, quipped that it was the first time anything had ever come from behind to beat Super Impose. Freedman later reflected that it was a 'funny feeling' in that, while he would have preferred to win, he was 'happy' that the O'Sullivans (trainers Paul and Dave and jockey Lance) had won because he had always had friendly relations with them and they had finished second in three previous runnings of the race - with Shivaree (1979), (Our) Waverley Star (1986), and Horlicks (1988).

Surfers Paradise became the third New Zealand Derby winner - after Bonecrusher (1985) and Castletown (1989) - to pass $2 million in prizemoney.

After this preparation, Surfers Paradise had a further 22 starts in New Zealand, and won six races, including the Hawke's Bay Cup. In three subsequent visits to Australia, however, he finished near the tail of the field in each of his six starts.

After running his last race in Australia, in April 1994, Surfers Paradise was sent to the United States, where he contested poor quality races and died from a heart condition in the late-1990s.

== See also ==
- Thoroughbred racing in New Zealand
- Thoroughbred racing in Australia
