= Our Flight =

New Zealand-bred Thoroughbred racehorse

- Sire: Imperial Guard
- Grandsire: Brigadier Gerard
- Dam: Jane Flight
- Damsire: Mellay
- Sex: Filly
- Foaled: 1980
- Country: New Zealand
- Colour: Bay
- Breeder: J W Rusher
- Owner: J W Rusher
- Trainer: Errol Skelton
- Record: 19:9-3-2
- Earnings: $208,725

Major wins
- New Zealand Derby (1982); New Zealand 1000 Guineas(1982); Levin Classic (1982)
- Last updated on February 26, 2008

Our Flight is a Thoroughbred racehorse who won the New Zealand Derby in 1982, one of the very few fillies to have done so in the history of the race.

Trained at Levin by Errol Skelton, the filly didn't show a great deal as a two-year-old but quickly proved herself as the champion three-year-old of the 1982–83 season. Travelling down to the Guineas meeting at Riccarton on the back of two impressive victories at Trentham, Our Flight was beaten by a nose in the 2000 Guineas before asserting her dominance over the fillies in the 1000 Guineas the following Saturday. Shortly after she added the Bayer Classic and Eulogy Stakes.

By the time she passed the post in the Derby as a narrow winner over subsequent Auckland Cup winner Secured Deposit, she had won eight of her ten races as a three-year-old and finished second in the other two. The Derby was her third Group 1 victory.

After the Derby she only raced twice more, and on the first of those occasions was a close third to Aulyn and Traffiker in the New Zealand Oaks.

== See also ==
- Thoroughbred racing in New Zealand
