= New Zealand Oaks =

New Zealand thoroughbred horse race

- Class: Group I
- Location: Ellerslie, Auckland formerly Trentham, Wellington, New Zealand
- Race type: Thoroughbred - Flat racing

Race information
- Distance: 2400 m (12 furlongs)
- Surface: Turf
- Track: Right-handed (Ellerslie), Left-handed (Trentham)
- Qualification: Three-year-old fillies
- Weight: Set-Weights
- Purse: NZ$1,000,000 (2026)

The New Zealand Oaks is a Group 1 Thoroughbred horse race for three-year-old fillies run at set weights over a distance of 2400 metres (1 1/2 miles).

== Venue and scheduling ==
The New Zealand Oaks was run at Riccarton until 1972 and over the distance of 1 1/4 miles to 1974.

Until 2025 it was held on the third Saturday of March every year at Trentham Racecourse in Wellington, New Zealand. In 2025 it was raced on the same day as the:

- Cuddle Stakes (Group 3, 1600m) for fillies and mares.
- New Zealand St. Leger (2500m).
- Wellington Guineas (Group 2, 1400m) for 3-year olds,
- Lightning Handicap (listed open, 1200m).

The Levin Classic (1600m) for 3-year horses was raced on the Oaks race-day in 2022 and 2023, but was returned to January.

In September 2025 it was announced that the New Zealand Oaks would be shifted to Ellerslie Racecourse, Auckland, in an attempt to preserve the race's Group 1 status. The 2026 edition would be moved to an earlier date on February 21, two weeks before the NZ Derby so fillies have the option to start in the Derby and to provide a better pathway to races like the Australian Oaks in early April.

The 2026 New Zealand Oaks was scheduled on the same days as the following races:

- Uncle Remus Stakes (Group 3, 1400m) for 3 year olds.
- Avondale Guineas (Group 2, 2100m) for 3 year olds.
- Otaki-Maori Weight for Age (Group 1, 1600m), which had also been moved to Ellerslie
- Avondale Cup (Group 3, 2400m), an open handicap.

== Notable winners ==
With the consistent strength of New Zealand fillies, the race has an impressive list of winners, including:

- Bonneval: twice New Zealand Horse of the Year, winner of the 2017 Cambridge Stud Sir Tristram Fillies Classic, Lowland Stakes, Australian Oaks (ATC), Feehan Stakes and Underwood Stakes.
- Glamour Bay: winner of the 1981 Auckland Thoroughbred Breeders Stakes and ARC Royal Stakes and runner up in the 1980 New Zealand 1000 Guineas and 1980 Auckland Thoroughbred Breeders Stakes.
- La Mer.
- Legs: the 2006 Kelt Capital Stakes winner.
- Pennyweka: winner of the 2023 Australian Oaks (ATC)
- Princess Coup: winner of the 2007 and 2008 Kelt Capital Stakes, 2008 Stoneybridge Stakes and 3rd in the Caulfield Cup.
- Savvy Coup: winner of the 2017 Eulogy Stakes, 2018 Lowland Stakes and Spring Classic plus 3rd in the 2018 Karaka Million 3Y0 Classic and Levin Classic.
- Solveig: the winner of the 1986 Avondale Cup and Captain Cook Stakes.
- Tycoon Lil: winner of 1997 New Zealand 1000 Guineas, 1998 Cambridge Stud Sir Tristram Fillies Classic and Canterbury Guineas, runner up in the 1997 New Zealand 2000 Guineas and Rosehill Guineas and 3rd to Might and Power in the 1998 Cox Plate.

Cup winners Empire Rose and Prize Lady were runners up.

== Winning jockeys ==
The most successful jockeys have been:

- Chris Johnson - 5 wins (1990, 1995, 1997, 1998 and 2018)
- Opie Bosson - 5 wins (2000, 2003, 2007, 2010 and 2021)
- Greg Childs - 4 wins (1982, 1983, 1984 and 1987)

== Race results ==
Year	Winner	Sire	Dam	Jockey	Trainer(s)	Owner(s)	Time	Second	Third
2026	Ohope Wins	Ocean Park	Choux Mania	Joe Doyle	Lance O'Sullivan & Andrew Scott	Yu Long Investments (Australia) Pty Ltd	2:31.17 (soft)	Autumn Glory	Single Red
2025	Leica Lucy	Derryn (Aus)	Dynamite Lucy	Craig Grylls	Robbie Patterson, New Plymouth	Aziz Kheir, Peter & Heather Crofskey	2:29.41 (soft)	Dubai Gold	Myakkabelle
2024	Pulchritudinous	Wrote	Showus	Warren Kennedy	Chad Ormsby	C Grace, J Walker, Riverrock Farm, D Roach & M J Moroney	2:29.67 (soft)	Positivity	Qali Al Farrasha
2023	Pennyweka	Satono Aladdin (JPN)	Threepence	Ryan Elliott	Jim Wallace	The Galloping Wekas Jazweka Syndicate	2.31.18 (soft)	Mehzebeen	Mischief Managed
2022	Belle En Rouge	Burgundy (NZ)	Cavendish Belle	Jason Laking	Jamie Richards, Matamata	Te Akau Beautiful In Red Racing Partnership (Mgr: Karyn Fenton-Ellis MNZM)	2:31.07 (dead)	Self Obsession	Aspen Colorado
2021	Amarelinha	Savabeel (AUS)	Hopscotch	Opie Bosson	Jamie Richards, Matamata	Te Akau Hopskip'n'jump Syndicate	2:29.65	Charms Star	Llanacord
2020	Jennifer Eccles	Rip Van Winkle (Ire)	Platinum Elle (NZ)	Jason Waddell	Shaune Ritchie, Cambridge	Challenge No.10 Syndicate (Adrian Clark)	2:30.74	Vancooga	Feel The Rush
2019	Sentimental Miss	Reliable Man (GB)	Nostalgic (Aus)	Lisa Allpress	Lisa Latta, Awapuni	Go Racing Yesteryear Syndicate	2:35.08	Beyond The Fort	Star Karen
2018	Savvy Coup	Savabeel (AUS)	Eudora	Chris Johnson	Michael & Matthew Pitman, Riccarton	AM, AR, CJ, FH & JF Bruford, JD, LR & RA Coupland	2:29.03	Contessa Vanessa	Milseain
2017	Bonneval	Makfi	Imposingly	Matthew Cameron	Murray Baker & Andrew Forsman, Cambridge	T W Jarvis, A R Lawrence & J A Rattray	2:31.99	Devise	Savvy Dreams
2016	Fanatic	Shocking (Aus)	Komplete Klass (NZ)	Mark Hills	Graeme Sanders & Debbie Sweeney, Te Awamutu	SP Kiernan	2:29.47	Sofia Rosa	Strada Cavallo
2015	Savaria	Savabeel (AUS)	Amathea (NZ)	Hayden Tinsley	Roydon Bergerson, Awapuni	D P & Mrs K C Fleming	2:29.67	Platinum Witness	Charmont
2014	Miss Mossman	Mossman (Aus)	Dane Promise (AUS)	Johnathan Parkes	John Sargent & Hayden Allen	RBC Racing	2:27.78	Miss Selby	Rock Diva
2013	More Than Sacred	More Than Ready (USA)	Danalaga (AUS)	Leith Innes	Tony Pike & Mark Donoghue, Cambridge	Raffles Dancers (NZ) Pty Ltd	2:30.46	Blanket Bay	Aurora Lights
2012	Artistic	Darci Brahma (NZ)	Artless (AUS)	Michael Coleman	Shaune Ritchie, Cambridge	The Oaks Stud	2:28.39	Zurella	Quintessential
2011	Midnight Oil	Keeper (AUS)	Gilded Light (AUS)	Rosie Myers	Paul Duncan, Cambridge	Nineteenth Syndicate	2:30.04	Zennista	Insurgent
2010	Keep The Peace	Keeper (AUS)	Peace of Mind (NZ)	Opie Bosson	Shaune Ritchie, Cambridge	P E Bellingham, L R & L R D Dittman	2:28.49	November Rain	Zarzuela
2009	Jungle Rocket	Jungle Pocket (Jap)	Gu Li (NZ)	James McDonald	Jeff McVean, Cambridge	C & Mrs L Betts, Mrs C & D Pleasance	2:30.07	Can't Keeper Down	Mill Duckie
2008	Boundless	Van Nistelrooy (USA)	Nothing Less	Hayden Tinsley	Stephen McKee, Ardmore	P A Dallimore, Trevor McKee ONZM, P N Miller & Mrs C N Taylor	2:28.74	Referred	Pentura
2007	Princess Coup	Encosta de Lago (AUS)	Stoneyfell Road (AUS)	Opie Bosson	Mark Walker, Matamata	Bromley Bloodstock Ltd & Ray Coupland	2:32.94	Overkaast	Veloce Bella
2006	Legs	Pins (AUS)	River Century (NZ)	David Walker	Kevin Gray, Copper Belt Lodge	Waikato Stud 2001 Ltd.	2:29.42	Out Of Align	Falsetto
2005	Justa Tad	Istidaad (USA)	Infinity	Vincent Colgan	Rudy Liefting, Takanini	R P Liefting	2:29.52	Prize Lady	Sahara Flight
2004	Wharite Princess	His Royal Highness	Regal Visit (by Vice Regal)	Bruce Herd	Lisa Latta, Awapuni	NM Cantwell, MR Curd, TA Robinson, KJ Tod, KR Williams & RJ Wong	2:26.88	Filante Etoile	Midnight Kiss
2003	Bramble Rose	Shinko King (Ire)	Images (NZ)	Opie Bosson	Sir Mark Todd, Cambridge	Rivermonte Racing Syndicate	2:27.71	The Jewell	Lady Annaliese
2002	Vapour Trail	Jetball (Aus)	Devil's Lair (NZ)	Scott Seamer	Donna & Dean Logan, Ruakaka	P J & P M Vela Ltd	2:30.88	Sursum Corda	Damaschino
2001	Tapildo	Rhythm (USA)	Emulate (NZ)	Mark Du Plessis	Sheila Laxon	Ian M & Sydney T Taplin	2:28.05	Singalong	Danasia
2000	She's Country	Kenfair	Cross Country	Opie Bosson	Bruce Wallace, Takanini	TJ Bodle	2:29.80	Hill of Grace	You Beauty
1999	Savannah Success	Success Express (USA)	Alma Mater (AUS)	Lance O'Sullivan	Graeme Rogerson	JM Haseler & GA Rogerson	2:28.48	Pravda	No Alimony
1998	Tycoon Lil	Last Tycoon (Ire)	Imposing Bloom II (NZ)	Chris Johnson	Colin Jillings & Richard Yiull, Takanini	PJ Walker	2:31.10	Pavan	Kilmore Quay
1997	Sawatdee	Deputy Governor (USA)	Chanson D'Amour	Chris Johnson	Alan Howatson, Hawera	I B Cassels, C F Dunbar, A E & R O Nicol	2:28.71	Bao Cacao	Taupari Lass
1996	Alacrity	Grosvenor (NZ)	Daybreak Express (AUS)	Brian Hibberd	Mike Moroney, Matamata	Mrs A & D Paykel & Mrs EI Wells	2:28.87	The Lions Roar	San Goma
1995	Tartan Tights	Tights (USA)	Ultra Sound	Chris Johnson	Ellis Winsloe, Gore	G L Robertson	2:26.26	Rampage Queen	Sneetch
1994	Snap	Kingdom Bay	Crackle	Lance O'Sullivan	Dave & Paul O'Sullivan, Matamata	Mrs LM O'Sullivan & Lord Robin Tavistock	2:28.17	Facing The Music	Mess
1993	Miltak	McGinty (NZ)	Encore (NZ)	David Walsh	Dave & Paul O'Sullivan, Matamata	Miktak Syndicate	2:30.03	Village Dancer	Slanchyvah
1992	Staring	Fiesta Star (AUS)	Sweet Violet (NZ)	Noel Harris	Murray Baker, Woodville	Grovedale Trust & MK Gyde	2:28.96	Conifer Bay	Fine Design
1991	Let's Sgor	Creag-An-Sgor	Alycide	Larry Cassidy	Murray Baker, Woodville	MA Fisher, PM Paterson, EGL Simpson & TG Whiteman	2:30.22	Plume	Narration
1990	Domino	Grosvenor (NZ)	Tupelo Honey	Chris Johnson	Jim Campin, Cambridge	J W Campin	2:29.81	Blue Music	Te Akau Pearl
1989	Regal Empress	Triumphal March (USA)	Empress Lu (NZ)	Catherine Tremayne		RN & Mrs MS Fraser, Mrs JA Lang & NA Leitch	2:30.60	Kate's Myth	Sarah Fay
1988	Candide	Sound Reason (Can)	Country Flower (NZ)	Ross Elliott		M & Miss SA Joseph & Trans Media Park Stud Pty Ltd	2:27.96	Savana City	Red Chifton
1987	Starline	Sir Tristram (Ire)	Star Lot	Greg Childs	Ray Verner, Takanini	Miss MB Macdougall & Mrs LS Otway	2:32.30	Sounds Like Fun	Etoile d'Or
1986	Royal Heights	Sir Tristram (Ire)	Claudine	Wawrick Robinson	Ross Douglas, Morrinsville	Mr and Mrs R F Douglas	2:26.50	Empire Rose	Eau D'Etoile
1985	Solveig	Imposing	Soliloquoy	Grant Cooksley	Colin Curnow & Trevor McKee, Takanini	RE & RWE Moore	2:28.94	Pass A Glance	Avana
1984	Zepherin	Zephyr Bay	Lucky Bid	Greg Childs	Jim Gibbs & Roger James, Matamata	Balcarres Stud Ltd	2:29.11	Duanette's Girl	Aptitude
1983	Aulyn	Auk	Helyn	Greg Childs	Ray Verner, Takanini	BM Mollet	2:28.03	Trafficker	Our Flight
1982	Maurita	Harbor Prince	Cathmol	Greg Childs	Jim Gibbs, Matamata	PR Kearns, A O'Malley & E Yee	2:31.25	Amrica	Placio
1981	Glamour Bay	Zephyr Bay	Glamour Test (by Test Case)	Bruce Compton	FR Begueley, Matamata	K Joe, JH Lindsay & J McAnnalley	2:29.25	Summer Haze	Just From Santa
1980	Supreme Glory	Final Orders	Supreme One	Jim Walker	H Furness, Paeroa	CE Proctor, MG & Mrs Thwaites	2:30.25	Pays Anne	Firefly
1979	Tang	Taipan II	Agricolet (by Agricola)	Des Harris	Charlie Cameron, Hastings	DB & EJ Callaghan & RM Miller	2:29.25	Tui's Lass	Springtide (relegated from 2nd)
1978	Athenaia	Hermes	Meleina (by Timanova)	Robert Vance	Colin Jillings, Takanini	Sir Tristran Antico, Mrs DH Munro & TJ Smith	2:28.50	Mun Lee	Kindled
1977	La Mer	Copenhagen II	La Balsa	Des Harris	Malcolm Smith, New Plymouth		2:29.25	Blintz	Star Chick
1976	Eastern Time	Hermes	Letty (by Klorassan)	David Peake	Royce Dowling, Te Rapa	J L Chionbian	2:32.00	Entice	Nena
1975	Princess Patrice	Charicles	How About That	Gary Phillips	M C Conway, Avondale	DA Hagar & PS Wilson	2:28.5		
1974	Sweet Offer	Sucaryl	Fair Offer	Gary Phillips	Brian Deacon, Hawera	ID & Mrs Parsons	2:29.75		
1972	Brown Satin	Mellay (GB)	Satinette	AK Robinson		BG, C and JWG White	2:04.6		
1971	Young Ida	Oncidium (GB)	Young Margaret II (Ire)	JA Messent		JHT Duncan	2:05.4		
1970	Devante	Sobig	Skylit	JA Messent	C J Cameron, Hastings	MW Owen & TS Sellwood	2:02.6		
1969	Princess Mellay	Mellay (GB)	Princess Ermine	AK Robinson		Mrs HA Anderton	2:03.4		

There was no race in 1973.

== See also ==
- Recent winners of major NZ races for 3 year olds
- Desert Gold Stakes
- New Zealand Derby
- New Zealand 1000 Guineas
- New Zealand 2000 Guineas
- New Zealand Thoroughbred Breeders Stakes
- New Zealand St. Leger
