= DB Draught Classic =

The DB Draught Classic was a major thoroughbred horse race in New Zealand. Run at Ellerslie Racecourse in early March it was called New Zealand's first million-dollar race. However it was run only twice, 1989 and 1990, for total stake money of $950,000 and $970,000 respectively.

The race had Group 1 status and was run over 2100m. Both editions were won by the 1989 Japan Cup winner Horlicks.

Year	1st	2nd	3rd	Winner's rider	Time	Margin
1990	Horlicks, 56.5 kg	The Phantom 56 kg	Castletown 57 kg	Lance O'Sullivan	2:07.08	1.5 Length
1989	Horlicks, 56.5 kg	Regal City, 56 kg	Westminster, 57 kg	Lance O'Sullivan	2:07.09	0.5 length

== See also ==
- Thoroughbred racing in New Zealand
