= Veandercross =

New Zealand-bred Thoroughbred racehorse

- Sire: Crossways (GB)
- Grandsire: Habitat (USA)
- Dam: Lavender
- Damsire: Super Gray (USA)
- Sex: Gelding
- Foaled: 14 October 1988
- Died: 18 October 2014 (aged 26)
- Country: New Zealand
- Colour: Brown
- Owner: Chris Turner
- Trainer: Chris Turner co-trained by John Wheeler
- Jockey: Jim Walker; Shane Dye; Mick Dittman
- Record: 40: 15-9-4
- Earnings: A$2,602,524

Major wins
- New Zealand 2000 Guineas (1991); Levin Classic (1991); Canterbury Guineas (1992); LKS Mackinnon Stakes (1992); Queen Elizabeth Stakes (1993); Ranvet Stakes (1993); Australian Cup (1993); Lion Brown Sprint (1993)

Awards
- 1992/3 Australian Champion Racehorse of the Year

Honours
- New Zealand Racing Hall of Fame
- Last updated on 17 August 2011

Veandercross (14 October 1988 – 18 October 2014) was a New Zealand-bred Thoroughbred gelding who won 14 stakes races (including eight Group One), and was chosen Australian Champion Racehorse of the Year for the 1992–93 season.

Veandercross was a brown, rangy gelding bred by Bill Luey at Lower Hutt not far from the Trentham Racecourse. Foaled on 14 October 1988, he was by Crossways (GB), out of the unraced mare Lavender, who was in turn a daughter of the sire Super Gray (USA), meaning he was closely inbred (3m x 3f) to champion racehorse and sire Nijinsky. Crossways only produced two other stakes winners in his career, Awesome Ways and Prince of Praise. Lavender had nine foals race for three winners.

== Racing career ==
He was trained by his part-owner Chris Turner, a full-time schoolteacher at the provincial racing centre of Wanganui in New Zealand, prompting his nickname, "The Wanganui Wonder". He was usually ridden by jockey Jim Walker.

=== Three-year-old races in New Zealand ===
Veandercross showed immediate promise in the 1991–1992 New Zealand racing season when as a three-year-old he won his first three races including two listed events. He then ran second in the Wanganui Guineas to the front running Lodore Lady before winning the Okawa Guineas at Hastings. He was narrowly defeated twice at Trentham, in the Wellington Guineas trial (½ length) and the Wellington Guineas (by a head to Solvit). He easily won the New Zealand 2000 Guineas and the Bayer Classic (now called the Levin Classic) - both G1 races over 1,600 metres. Then he came north for the Avondale Guineas and once more ran home late, for third placing.

On to the New Zealand Derby and in a very rough race where the eventual winner Cavallieri (a horse who never won another race) bumped a number of horses sideways, cannoning a horse into Veandercross, who recovered his stride, but he couldn't quite overtake the winner, going down by a half head. The siren went, but in an extraordinary enquiry, the stewards dismissed the appeal.

In these races, he displayed what would become his characteristic come-from-behind style of racing. It made it more likely he would encounter trouble in the run, and he was often described as "unlucky in defeat." An increasing number of pundits were starting to blame jockey Jim Walker for his unlucky late runs but Chris Turner fully supported the jockey.

=== Three-year-old races in Australia ===
Given the immense promise he had shown in New Zealand, it was decided to send Veandercross to Australia for the autumn racing carnival in Sydney. In Australia, he would be co-trained by John Wheeler, of Rough Habit fame. On his Australian debut, he put in one of his "unlucky" closing efforts in defeat in the Gosford Guineas over 1,600 metres. He would show his true ability at his next start in the Canterbury Guineas over 1,900 metres, where his opponents included the best three-year-old in Australia, Naturalism. At Canterbury, Veandercross came from last of about 20 runners on a tight-turning track to win. Naturalism was second. Next time out, Naturalism and Veandercross again faced each other in the Rosehill Guineas over 2,000 metres. Veandercross started as the favourite horse, and again dropped out to last and ran on strongly, but he encountered interference in the straight, and Naturalism was able to hang on to score a narrow victory. Naturalism and Veandercross again met in the AJC Australian Derby over 2,400 metres, which would be the decider as to who was the best three-year-old in Australasia, Veandercross ran on from well back, but failed to catch Naturalism.

=== Four-year-old racing season ===
Veandercross returned an even better horse as a four-year-old. He started with an easy win in the Trust Bank Stakes (G3) on his home track, then chased home the front running Conan in the Mason Appliances (G2) at New Plymouth. He reversed that result in his next race, easily winning the Kelt Capital Stakes (G3) at Hastings, defeating Conan on the line. Veandercross was then sent to Australia to start favourite in the Caulfield Cup. On Cup day the Caulfield track was an absolute bog. In one of the most controversial rides in Australian racing history, champion jockey Shane Dye went extremely wide on the home turn to avoid the slow, muddy ground on the inside. Despite covering this extra ground, Veandercross managed to pass every runner in the straight except one, the talented mare Mannerism, who won in a photo finish after staying inside Veandercross. Shane Dye was widely criticised for his ride, but he defended himself, insisting that the extra ground he covered on the horse was more than made up for by the firmer ground he raced on as a result. Nevertheless, the criticism persisted, and recreations of the horse's journey in the race showed that he covered nearly 2,500 metres, in what was supposed to be a 2,400 metre race.

At his next start, Veandercross won the G1 LKS Mackinnon Stakes at Flemington, overcoming interference to win emphatically. This would be his last prep race before the Melbourne Cup three days later, a race in which he would start favourite. It was again a wet track, and although Veandercross ploughed home determinedly, he could not catch the wet track stayer Subzero in the straight. So Veandercross finished his campaign with the frustrating record of having run second in both the major Cups races.

Veandercross returned as an autumn four-year-old, winning the Lion Brown Sprint (G1) at Te Rapa in New Zealand, and then the Carlyon Cup and the Australian Cup in Melbourne. He then travelled north to Sydney where he would face his old rival Naturalism in the Ranvet Stakes. In the meantime, Naturalism had franked their three-year-old form internationally by running second in the Japan Cup in the spring. In the Ranvet Stakes, Veandercross was clearly superior, winning by over a length and confirming his position as the best racehorse in Australasia. He then ran third in The BMW Stakes (G1) and reconfirmed his supremacy winning the AJC Queen Elizabeth Stakes over 2,000 metres at Randwick impressively.

This rounded off an excellent four-year-old season, which had netted five G1 victories. At the end of the 1992/3 racing season, he was crowned Australian Champion Racehorse of the Year.

=== Five-year-old campaign ===
Expectations were high when Veandercross returned to racing as a five-year-old. He started his season with a sixth on his home track before he raced home in the Russells Akai TV Stakes (G3) at Hawkes Bay, just failing to catch, Calm Harbour, by a neck, with a neck back to Solvit. He then went over to Australia, where after a good opening run for fifth in the Underwood Stakes, he failed in the Caulfield Stakes. He then contested the Cox Plate and was unsuccessful again, and finished his season early after an eighth in the Mackinnon Stakes, being defeated in those races by many of the horses over whom he had been dominant the previous season.

=== Six-year-old campaign ===
Veandercross commenced his campaign with a sixth in the Trust Bank Stakes (G3) at Wanganui, but was right back to his best with a good run in the Enerco Stakes (G2) at Hastings, flashing home for second to new star Snap, with half head back to Solvit. He then crossed the Tasman Sea, opening with another fast finish for fourth behind Durbridge in the George Main Stakes at Randwick. Then he succumbed to an injury and was retired.

=== 1997–98 season ===
After a long break Veandercross returned to racing in the 1997-8 season aged nine, with a big effort for a close seventh in the Waikato Draught Sprint (G1), then stormed home again for a close ninth in the Otaki Maori WFA 1400 (G1). He once more headed across the Tasman for one last Australian campaign, but couldn't recapture his form and was defeated by Octagonal in the Australian Cup at Flemington and failed to run on in the Easter Cup at Caulfield. Chris Turner then made the decision to finally retire this champion racehorse.

He had 40 starts during his career for 15 wins, nine seconds and four thirds, earning A$2,602,524. He won eight times at Group One level.

=== Summary ===
Veandercross was a top-quality middle distance horse who became the dominant weight-for-age racehorse in Australasia. He is remembered for his rivalry with Naturalism, and for having run second in the Melbourne Cup and Caulfield Cup in 1992.

=== Death ===
Veandercross was euthanized on Caulfield Cup day 2014 (October 18) aged 26.

== See also ==
- Thoroughbred racing in New Zealand
