= Balmerino (horse) =

New Zealand-bred Thoroughbred racehorse (1972–1996)

- Sire: Trictrac (FR)
- Grandsire: Le Haar
- Dam: Dulcie
- Damsire: Duccio
- Sex: Stallion
- Foaled: 11 November 1972
- Died: 30 May 1996 (aged 23)
- Country: New Zealand
- Colour: Bay
- Breeder: Ralph K. Stuart
- Owner: Ralph K. Stuart; Colours: emerald green, red stars, red sleeves and cap.
- Trainer: Brian Smith; John Dunlop
- Record: 46: 22-11-2
- Earnings: $486,202

Major wins
- Hawke's Bay Guineas (1975); New Zealand 2000 Guineas (1975); New Zealand Derby (1975); Rawson Stakes (1976); Tulloch Stakes (1976); P J O'Shea Stakes (1976); Brisbane Cup (1976); Air New Zealand Stakes (1977); Awapuni Gold Cup (1977); Ormond Memorial (1977); Valdoe Stakes (1977)

Awards
- New Zealand Horse of the Year (1976); Australian Champion Three Year Old (1976)

Honours
- New Zealand Racing Hall of Fame (2008); Australian Racing Hall of Fame (2019); Timeform rating: 133
- Last updated on 20 December 2025

Balmerino (11 November 1972 – 30 May 1996) was a bay Thoroughbred stallion that was foaled at Cambridge in the Waikato region of New Zealand. He later became a champion racehorse with many international successes.

== Breeding ==
Balmerino was by Trictrac (FR), his dam was the unraced, Dulcie, who was by Duccio (ITL). Trictrac (FR), sired seven stakes winners that won 33 stakes races. Before Balmerino was foaled Dulcie had already produced Fulmen, Fileur, Gay Philou, Micheline and Mia Bella, all good gallopers by Le Filou (FR). After her death Dulcie was posthumously awarded the 1975-6 New Zealand "Broodmare of the Year".

== Racing career ==
Balmerino was the champion three-year-old of his year, winning both the New Zealand 2000 Guineas and New Zealand Derby. Those wins and his subsequent success against older horses in both the Air New Zealand Stakes and in races in Australia confirmed that he would be a landslide winner of the Horse of the Year award in New Zealand. He also won the Australian Three Year-Old of the Year award for the 1975-76 season.

Later in his career he travelled to the Northern Hemisphere and performed very well in some of the best races in Europe. He won the Group one (G1) Gran Premio del Jockey Club e Coppa d'Ora in Italy, before being relegated to second place, and also ran second in the Coronation Cup and the Eclipse Stakes.

One of Balmerino's most notable performances was in the Prix de l'Arc de Triomphe of 1978, when he came second in a star-studded field to champion racehorse Alleged (Timeform rating 138).

During 1977 Balmerino had 39 starts in New Zealand, Australia, the United States, England, Italy and France for 21 wins, 9 seconds, 1 third and stakes winnings for the equivalent of (AUD)$400,000. He was joint Champion Older Horse in both England and France for the 1977 seasons and was awarded a Timeform rating of 133 in 1977 and 124 in 1978.

== Stud career ==
He was retired to stud in 1979 and stood with moderate success in New Zealand, where he sired 29 stakes winners of 80 stakes races.

His group one winners were:

- Balciano: winner of the 1987 AJC Metropolitan Handicap.
- Bounty Hawk: winner of the 1983 Victoria Derby, WATC Western Mail Classic, 1984 LKS Mackinnon Stakes and Underwood Stakes.
- Dinky Flyer: winner of the 1987 AJC Queen Elizabeth Stakes.
- Donegal Mist: winner of the 1990 AJC Metropolitan Handicap.
- Eastern Classic: winner of the 1990 All Aged Stakes.
- Linc The Leopard: winner of the 1988 Perth Cup.

Balmerino died at Cambridge on 30 May 1996. He was inducted into the New Zealand Racing Hall of Fame in 2008.

== Sire line tree ==
- Balmerino
  - Bounty Hawk
  - Globetrotter
  - Eastern Classic
  - Linc The Leopard
  - Rocket Racer
  - Balciano
  - Snow Chief
  - Kessem
    - Kessem Power
  - Donegal Mist

== See also ==
- Thoroughbred racing in New Zealand
