= Victory Dias =

New Zealand-bred Thoroughbred racehorse

Victory Dias is a New Zealand thoroughbred racehorse. Born in 1988, by Avon's Lord out of My Totara Lass.

Victory Dias was bred by D V Moore, C G Anderson (née Tapper), and E V J Tapper, and owned by Moore, Anderson, and Tapper's estate.

The horse ran 27 races in New Zealand, with seven victories and six further placings. It's career highlight was victory in the 1993 Telegraph Handicap, ridden by Craig Beets which was in a then world record time for the 1200m of 1:06.59. It also placed 2nd behind Primacy in the 1993 Newmarket Handicap at Flemington.

== See also ==
- Thoroughbred racing in New Zealand
