= Brew (horse) =

New Zealand-bred Thoroughbred racehorse

- Sire: Sir Tristram
- Grandsire: Sir Ivor
- Dam: Horlicks
- Damsire: Three Legs
- Sex: Gelding
- Foaled: 24 November 1994 (age 31)
- Country: New Zealand
- Colour: Bay
- Breeder: G. W. de Gruchy
- Owner: B. A. Schroder, A. P. Ramsden, P. A. Moroney & others
- Trainer: Michael Moroney
- Earnings: $2,383,467

Major wins
- Melbourne Cup (2000); Saab Quality (2000); The Bart Cummings (2000)

Awards
- Australian Champion Stayer (2001)

Brew (foaled 1994 in New Zealand) is a small, plain bay Thoroughbred gelding who won the 2000 Melbourne Cup for trainer Mike Moroney and jockey Kerrin McEvoy.

== Racing career ==
Brew's first stakes win was the Listed Japan Trophy at 2559 metres on Turnbull Stakes day. This race is now called The Bart Cummings and is run at Group 3 level. Brew carried the lightweight of 49 kilograms and defeated the veteran Yippyio and the stablemate Second Coming in the Melbourne Cup. After finishing second to Yippyio in the Moonee Valley Cup, Brew qualified for the Melbourne Cup by winning The Group 2 Saab Quality at 2500 metres on Derby Day, three days before the Cup. When winning the Saab Quality, Brew achieved a Timeform rating of 113. Brew is a son of Sir Tristram and the champion New Zealand racemare and Japan Cup winner Horlicks but was gelded before showing his best form. The Melbourne Cup was Brew's last win. In the Melbourne Cup, Brew achieved a career peak Timeform rating of 114. Brew also ran in the previous Melbourne Cup in 1999 which was won by Rogan Josh

Some time after winning the Melbourne Cup, Brew was spelled from racing and trained for duty as a police horse in Melbourne. He returned to racing but never found his previous form.

== Retirement ==
Brew retired to the Living Legends, the International Home of Rest for Champion Horses located in Woodlands Historic Park, Greenvale, Victoria, Australia. After the death of 1999 winner Rogan Josh on 24 June 2022, he became the oldest and the earliest winning of all the surviving Melbourne Cup winning horses.

== Pedigree ==
Pedigree of Brew
Sire Sir Tristram 1971	Sir Ivor 1965	Sir Gaylord	Turn-To
Sire Sir Tristram 1971	Sir Ivor 1965	Sir Gaylord	Somethingroyal
Sire Sir Tristram 1971	Sir Ivor 1965	Attica	Mr. Trouble
Sire Sir Tristram 1971	Sir Ivor 1965	Attica	Athenia
Sire Sir Tristram 1971	Isolt 1961	Round Table	Princequillo
Sire Sir Tristram 1971	Isolt 1961	Round Table	Knights Daughter
Sire Sir Tristram 1971	Isolt 1961	All My Eye	My Babu
Sire Sir Tristram 1971	Isolt 1961	All My Eye	All Moonshine
Dam Horlicks 1983	Three Legs 1972	Petingo	Petition
Dam Horlicks 1983	Three Legs 1972	Petingo	Alcazar
Dam Horlicks 1983	Three Legs 1972	Tedora	Hard Sauce
Dam Horlicks 1983	Three Legs 1972	Tedora	Tellastory
Dam Horlicks 1983	Malt 1978	Moss Trooper	Levmoss
Dam Horlicks 1983	Malt 1978	Moss Trooper	Forest Friend
Dam Horlicks 1983	Malt 1978	Gelu	Agricola
Dam Horlicks 1983	Malt 1978	Gelu	Froth

== See also ==
- List of Melbourne Cup winners
