= Michael Moroney (horseman) =

New Zealand racehorse trainer (1959–2025)

Personal information
- Full name: Michael Denis Moroney
- Born: 6 June 1958 Matamata, New Zealand
- Died: 27 February 2025 (aged 66) Melbourne, Victoria, Australia
- Occupation: Thoroughbred racehorse trainer

Horse racing career
- Sport: Horse racing

Significant horses
- Brew; Tofane; Xcellent
- Relatives: Sue Moroney (sister)

Michael Denis Moroney (6 June 1958 – 27 February 2025) was a New Zealand Thoroughbred racehorse trainer. He was notable for having trained Brew to win the 2000 Melbourne Cup and many other Group One races in New Zealand and Australia.

== Life and career ==
Moroney's mother was the daughter of Charlie and Ellie Casey, the breeders of 1960 Melbourne Cup winner Hi Jinx. Michael's father, Denny, was also involved in the racing industry and he continued to assist Michael.

Michael Moroney trained from the early 1980s on his own account but also in partnership with trainers including Dave and Paul O’Sullivan.

His first Group 1 win was with Imperial Angel in the 1985 New Zealand 1000 Guineas at Riccarton ridden by Jim Collett.

While based at Matamata, New Zealand, he twice won the New Zealand training premiership. He moved to Morphettville, Adelaide, Australia in 1999 and then three years later he transferred to Flemington, Victoria.

Moroney's first Group 1 win in Australia was with Heavenly Body in the 1989 South Australian Oaks.

In 2023 Moroney was inducted into the New Zealand Racing Hall of Fame.

Moroney's brother, Paul, whom he co-trained with at one stage is a bloodstock consultant and agent. His sister, Sue, was a member of the New Zealand Parliament for the New Zealand Labour Party from 2005 until 2017.

Michael Moroney died from cancer in Melbourne on 27 February 2025, at the age of 66.

Moroney's career included 55 Group 1 wins: 32 in New Zealand and 23 in Australia.

== Notable horses and victories ==
Moroney trained or co-trained a large number of high-class horses, including:

- Alabama Express, winner of the 2020 C F Orr Stakes
- Ball Park, winner of the 1994 Easter Handicap
- Brazilian Pulse, winner of the 2010 VRC Oaks
- Brew, winner of the 2000 Melbourne Cup
- Cannsea, winner of the 2000 Railway Stakes
- Capricious Lass, winner of the 1996 West Australian Derby
- Clean Sweep, winner of the 2004 New Zealand 2000 Guineas
- Coeur Volante, winner of the 2025 Mannerism Stakes
- Cut The Cake, winner of the 2003 New Zealand Derby
- Emissary, winner of the 2022 Geelong Cup and runner up in the 2022 Melbourne Cup
- Eskimo Queen, winner of the 2007 Queensland Oaks
- Glass Harmonium, winner of the 2011 Mackinnon Stakes
- Great Command, winner of the 1996 New Zealand Derby and 1997 New Zealand International Stakes
- Happyanunoit, winner of the 1998 Manawatu Sires Produce Stakes
- Imperial Angel, winner of the 1985 New Zealand 1000 Guineas
- Jokers Wild, winner of the 2006 Manawatu Sires Produce Stakes
- Lord Tridan, winner of the 1995 Telegraph Handicap
- Mission Critical, winner of the 2008 New Zealand International Stakes
- Mr Baritone, winner of the 2008 Stradbroke Handicap
- Monaco Consul, winner of the 2009 Victoria Derby
- Nacho Man, winner of the 2010 Manawatu Sires Produce Stakes
- On The Rocks, winner of the 2019 New Zealand International Stakes
- Roch 'N’ Horse, winner of the 2022 Newmarket Handicap & Champions Sprint (VRC)
- Sarrera, winner of the 2008 Doomben Cup & Queen Elizabeth Stakes (ATC)
- Second Coming, winner of the 1997 Victoria Derby and 2000 Wellington Cup, also placed 3rd to stable-mate Brew in the 2000 Melbourne Cup
- Shizu, winner of the 1999 The Thousand Guineas at Caulfield
- Sound, winner of the 2020 and 2021 Zipping Classic
- Tivaci, winner of the 2017 All Aged Stakes & Kensington Stakes and 2016 Sunshine Coast Guineas & C S Hayes Stakes
- Tofane, winner of the 2020 All Aged Stakes, 2021 Stradbroke Handicap & Tattersall's Tiara, 2022 C.F. Orr Stakes
- True Jewels, winner if the 2001 Blue Diamond Stakes
- Xcellent, winner of the 2004 New Zealand Derby, New Zealand Stakes, Mudgway Stakes and Kelt Capital Stakes as well as the New Zealand Horse of the Year in both the 2004–05 and 2005–06 seasons. He also ran third in the 2005 Melbourne Cup, behind three-time winner Makybe Diva.
- Yes Indeed, winner of the 1996 Wellington Cup

== See also ==
- Murray Baker
- Trevor McKee
- Dave O'Sullivan
- Lance O'Sullivan
- Jamie Richards
- Graeme Rogerson
- Mark Walker
- Chris Waller
- Thoroughbred racing in New Zealand
