= Horlicks (horse) =

New Zealand-bred Thoroughbred racehorse

- Breed: Thoroughbred
- Sire: Three Legs (GB)
- Grandsire: Petingo
- Dam: Malt
- Damsire: Moss Trooper (USA)
- Sex: Mare
- Foaled: 7 October 1983
- Died: 24 August 2011 (aged 27)
- Country: New Zealand
- Colour: Grey
- Breeder: Graham de Gruchy (NZ)
- Owner: Graham de Gruchy (NZ)
- Trainer: Dave and Paul O'Sullivan (NZ)
- Jockey: Lance O'Sullivan
- Record: 40: 17–10–2
- Earnings: NZ$4,165,407

Major wins
- ARC Television New Zealand Stakes (1988,1990); ARC DB Draught Classic (1989,1990); Japan Cup (1989); LKS Mackinnon Stakes (1989)

Honours
- New Zealand Racing Hall of Fame
- Last updated on 3 April 2009

Horlicks (07 October 1983 – 24 August 2011) was a Thoroughbred racemare from New Zealand. She won the internationally contested 1989 Japan Cup in a world record time of 2:22.2 for 2,400 metres. In addition to the Japan Cup, she won five Group One (G1) races in Australia and New Zealand.

== Background ==
Horlicks was by Three Legs (GB) from the unraced mare, Malt, by Moss Trooper (USA). Malt was later sold to the United States by Australian Bloodstock agent Brian King.

Her owner, Graham W. de Gruchy of Hastings, sent Horlicks to train with Dave and Paul O'Sullivan in April of 1986. When she entered the O'Sullivan stable, she was not considered to be a fast horse, with her taking more than 15 seconds to complete a 1 furlong run and was even suggested by her trainer to send her back to the ranch at one point.

== Racing career ==
Horlicks made her racing debut at a maiden race held at the Tauranga Racecourse on 30 December, 1986; where she came in 2nd place. The following month she won her first race. Contrary to the low expectations, she finished her three year old season with 4 victories out of the 8 races she ran, and started to run in group races the following year, with her coming in second place at her first group race (Air New Zealand Stakes) and winning her first group race at the Awapuni Gold Cup, and later her first Group 1 race at the 1988 Television New Zealand Stakes. She would also come in 2nd place that same year at the Australian Cox Plate.

For the 1989 season, major preparations were made for her entering the Japan Cup at an early stage, with her trainer doing stamina training for the 2400 metre run as well as preparation for quarantine. Before coming to Japan that year, she ran the DB Draught Classic in March and won her second Group 1 title, and her third at the Australian LKS MacKinnon Stakes.

=== The Japan Cup ===
Horlicks arrived to Japan earlier than the other foreign horses, and was placed in a stable for horses from the Southern Hemisphere for quarantine reasons. As she was the only horse entering from the Southern Hemisphere that year, Paul O'Sullivan resorted to placing a second hand mirror with scent from other horses to overcome her homesickness.

On the day of the race, owing to the prior lack of success of Oceanian horses, Horlicks was the 9th favored of the 15 horses competing, with the local Super Creek and Oguri Cap being the top two most favored. The race proceeded with Ibn Bey and Hawkster leading the race with Horlicks in 3rd place, and taking the lead once the two slowed down and fell behind. Oguri Cap tried to overtake her at the final stretch, but Horlicks managed to lead the stallion by a neck, setting a world record of 2:22.2. The time record Horlicks set would not be broken until 1999 when Asidero ran the Gran Premio Carlos Pellegrini in 2:21.98, and the course record was never broken until the Tokyo Racecourse went in to renovation in 2002. She was the third filly to win the Japan Cup after Mairzy Doates and Stanerra, and would remain the most recent filly to win the race until Vodka won the same race in 2009.

Her winning the Japan Cup was considered to be Horlick's career highlight when she was inducted in to the New Zealand Racing Hall of Fame in 2010.

=== After the Japan Cup ===
Horlicks would take a prolonged break before returning to race for the 1990 DB Draught Classic, where she won the race by breaking the course record she set the year before by 0.01 seconds. After this she would lose two races before winning the Television New Zealand Stakes. She was no longer able to win another race after this, and after she came in 8th place at the Cox Plate that year, she was retired to stud. She had a record of 17 wins and 12 places from 40 starts and career earnings of NZ$4,165,407.

=== Big race wins ===
- 1989 Japan Cup
- 1989 LKS MacKinnon Stakes beating King's High and Vo Rogue
- 1988 Television New Zealand Stakes
- 1990 Television New Zealand Stakes
- 1989 DB Draught Classic beating The Phantom and Castletown
- 1990 DB Draught Classic beating Regal City and Westminster

== Stud career ==
Horlicks became a broodmare at the Cambridge Stud, where she has also proven to be an outstanding broodmare, as the dam of the 2000 Melbourne Cup winner Brew, and the ill-fated stakes winner Bubble (both by Sir Tristram). Another daughter, Latte, was the dam of G1 AJC Australian Derby winner, Fiumicino.

In 2006 Horlicks delivered her 13th foal, a colt by One Cool Cat, at Cambridge Stud in New Zealand and was retired from stud duties at the age of 24 years.

Horlicks died on 24 August 2011 at Cambridge Stud and is buried at her breeder and owner's (Graham de Gruchy) stud farm.

Descendants of Horlicks include Mr Quickie, winner of the 2019 Queensland Derby, 2020 Toorak Handicap and 2021 Victoria Handicap.

== Pedigree ==
Pedigree of Horlicks (NZ), grey mare, 1983
| Sire Three Legs (GB) 1972 | Petingo; 1965 | Petition | Fair Trial |
| Sire Three Legs (GB) 1972 | Petingo; 1965 | Petition | Art Paper |
| Sire Three Legs (GB) 1972 | Petingo; 1965 | Alcazar | Alycidon |
| Sire Three Legs (GB) 1972 | Petingo; 1965 | Alcazar | Quarterdeck |
| Sire Three Legs (GB) 1972 | Teodora; 1963 | Hard Sauce | Ardan |
| Sire Three Legs (GB) 1972 | Teodora; 1963 | Hard Sauce | Saucy Bella |
| Sire Three Legs (GB) 1972 | Teodora; 1963 | Teliastory | Tulyar |
| Sire Three Legs (GB) 1972 | Teodora; 1963 | Teliastory | King's Story |
| Dam Malt (NZ) 1978 | Moss Trooper (USA); 1972 | Levmoss | Le Levanstell |
| Dam Malt (NZ) 1978 | Moss Trooper (USA); 1972 | Levmoss | Feemoss |
| Dam Malt (NZ) 1978 | Moss Trooper (USA); 1972 | Forest Friend | Linacre |
| Dam Malt (NZ) 1978 | Moss Trooper (USA); 1972 | Forest Friend | Belle Sauvage |
| Dam Malt (NZ) 1978 | Frill; 1969 | Agricola | Precipitation |
| Dam Malt (NZ) 1978 | Frill; 1969 | Agricola | Aurora |
| Dam Malt (NZ) 1978 | Frill; 1969 | Froth | Faux Tirage |
| Dam Malt (NZ) 1978 | Frill; 1969 | Froth | Home Brew (Family: 10-d) |

== See also ==
- Thoroughbred racing in New Zealand
