= Mr Tiz =

Australian-bred Thoroughbred racehorse

- Sire: Bletchingly
- Grandsire: Biscay
- Dam: Yir Tiz
- Damsire: Bismark
- Sex: Gelding
- Foaled: 1984
- Country: Australia
- Colour: Bay
- Owner: Lady & The Est late Sir James Fletcher, W D Jolly & C W Reynolds
- Trainer: Dave & Paul O'Sullivan
- Record: 36:17-2-6
- Earnings: $909,276

Major wins
- Railway Stakes (1989, 1990, 1991); Telegraph Handicap (1989, 1990); The Galaxy (1991); Waikato Sprint (1991)

Honours
- New Zealand Racing Hall of Fame (2014)
- Last updated on 11 May 2010

Mr Tiz (2 February 1984 – 30 January 2014) was a champion New Zealand thoroughbred racehorse. He is best known for his three consecutive wins in the Railway Stakes (1,200 metres) at Ellerslie, the country's premier sprint race for thoroughbreds. Mr Tiz remains the only horse to have achieved this feat. Furthermore, he also won New Zealand's other major sprint race, the Telegraph Handicap (1,200 metres) on two occasions.

== Background ==
Trained at Matamata by Dave and Paul O'Sullivan, the gelding was bred in Australia by International Thoroughbred Breeders, Inc. He raced 36 times for 17 wins, two seconds and six-thirds. Dave O'Sullivan, one of the most successful trainers in New Zealand racing history, labelled Mr Tiz "the greatest racehorse I've ever trained".

== Racing career ==
Mr Tiz showed his potential from very early in his career, being placed in his first two starts before a maiden win at Paeroa at his third raceday appearance. From there, his career took off - he won the Hawke's Bay Guineas in just the fourth start of his career.

But it was as a four-year-old, in the 1988–89 season, that his highest ability was observed. He dead-heated with another successful New Zealand sprinter, Westminster, in the Railway. Three weeks later, he won his first Telegraph, completing a Railway-Telegraph double. In winning the Telegraph, he again dead-heated with Festal.

He won both races again in the 1989–90 season, and completed his unprecedented Railway treble in 1991. That win has been claimed as one of the greatest sprint victories in New Zealand. Carrying 59 kg, Mr Tiz was severely checked and all but fell at about the 600-metre mark, and went to the back of the field. Yet from that impossible position, under a huge weight - and in a sprint race - Mr Tiz, ridden by regular jockey Lance O'Sullivan, stormed along the rail to win. The style of the win was "absolutely unforgettable". Later in the month, he finished second in the Telegraph, carrying a crushing 60.5 kg - and handicap weight given due to his brilliance.

In April 1991, Mr Tiz won The Galaxy in Sydney, one of the premier sprint races in Australia. Near the back of the field at the home turn, and seemingly in a hopeless position with 300 metres to run, Mr Tiz made up an extraordinary amount of ground to win. His trainer, Dave O'Sullvan, recounts: "I still can't believe how he won the Galaxy. He had 10 horses in front of him and he nearly fell trying to make his run. It was incredible. I still get the video out from time to time and it never fails to amaze me".

In the last start of his career, Mr Tiz finished third in the Group 1 Gadsden at Flemington in Melbourne.

== Retirement, legacy and death ==
In a country where stayers are more highly regarded than sprinters, Mr Tiz is considered a champion in his class.

He was honoured with a listed stakes race carrying his name at Ellerslie that was competed for by three-year-old horses over 1200m. However the name of the race was changed to the Almanzor Trophy.

Mr Tiz died 30 January 2014, at the age of 29.

== See also ==
- Thoroughbred racing in New Zealand
