= Popsy (horse) =

New Zealand-bred Thoroughbred racehorse

- Sire: Sir Tristram
- Grandsire: Sir Ivor
- Dam: Beks
- Damsire: In The Purple
- Sex: Filly
- Foaled: 7 October 1990
- Country: New Zealand
- Colour: Bay
- Breeder: Bhima Stud No. 4 Breeding Partnership
- Owner: Barnaby & Co. Limited
- Trainer: Dave & Paul O'Sullivan
- Record: 18:6-5-2
- Earnings: $351,750

Major wins
- New Zealand Derby (1993)
- Last updated on 3 July 2007

Popsy (foaled 7 October 1990) is a Thoroughbred racehorse who won the New Zealand Derby in 1993, one of very few fillies to have achieved the feat.

In 16 races in New Zealand, Popsy was unplaced only three times. She won twice at Group 1 level, following up her Derby win with a victory against fillies later in the season in the Championship Stakes.

She won at Group 2 level as a four-year-old, and finished second to Royal Tiara in a photo finish in the 1995 Auckland Cup.

As a broodmare, Popsy has been the dam of eight winners, including New Zealand 2000 Guineas winner Rock 'n' Pop and stakes-winner Lilakyn.

== See also ==
- Thoroughbred racing in New Zealand
