= Dave O'Sullivan (horse trainer) =

New Zealand racehorse trainer (1933/1934 – 2024)

Dave O'Sullivan OBE
Personal information
- Full name: David John O'Sullivan
- Born: 5 October 1933 New Zealand
- Died: 26 April 2024 (aged 90) Matamata, New Zealand
- Occupation: Racehorse trainer

Horse racing career
- Sport: Horse racing
- Career wins: 1877

Significant horses
- Horlicks; Mr Tiz; Waverley Star

Personal details
- Relatives: Lance O'Sullivan (son); Paul O'Sullivan (son)

David John O'Sullivan OBE (5 October 1933 – 26 April 2024) was a New Zealand Thoroughbred racehorse trainer. He is notable for having trained Horlicks to win the 1989 Japan Cup and many Group One races in New Zealand and Australia as well as being inducted into the New Zealand Racing Hall of Fame.

== Early life and riding career ==
O'Sullivan was born on 5 October 1933. He started as an apprentice jockey and had 125 wins over a decade of riding. He won the 1953 Railway Stakes on Te Awa, and would go on to win the race six times as a trainer.

== Training career ==
In February 1961, O'Sullivan became a licensed trainer. His first ever black-type win was Oopik ridden by then stable apprentice Peter Johnson in the 1973 Hawke's Bay Guineas. Oopik later won the 1976 Sydney Cup, ridden by O'Sullivan's first apprentice Roger Lang. The O’Sullivan/Lang combination also won with Shivaree in the 1979 Tancred Stakes and Queen Elizabeth Stakes (ATC) at Sydney.

During his training career, O'Sullivan won one premiership title independently (1978–79 with 62 wins) and eleven in partnership with his son, Paul. He trained 1877 winners. In 1990, O'Sullivan was awarded the New Zealand 1990 Commemoration Medal. In the 1992 Queen's Birthday Honours, he was appointed an Officer of the Order of the British Empire, for services to Thoroughbred racing.

In 2021, it was noted that O'Sullivan had attended the National Yearling Sales for 60 years. When interviewed he stated the best horse he purchased there was Mr Tiz.

== Death and legacy ==
O'Sullivan died on 26 April 2024, at the age of 90.

O'Sullivan's son Lance was a champion jockey who, like his father, was inducted into the New Zealand Racing Hall of Fame. Lance was appointed an Officer of the New Zealand Order of Merit, for services to Thoroughbred racing, in the 2003 New Year Honours.

== Notable horses and victories ==
Dave O'Sullivan trained or co-trained a large number of high-class horses, including:

- Blue Denim, winner of the 1980 Auckland Cup and runner up in the 1980 Melbourne Cup
- Cure, winner of the 1986 New Zealand 1000 Guineas
- Do Si Do, winner of the 1993 Ellerslie Sires Produce Stakes
- Eastern Joy, winner of the 1985 Easter Handicap
- Golden Rhapsody, winner of the 1982 Air New Zealand Stakes
- High Regards, winner of the 1985 Telegraph Handicap
- Horlicks, winner of the 1989 Japan Cup and LKS MacKinnon Stakes
- Hulastrike, winner of the 1992 New Zealand 2000 Guineas
- Koiro Corrie May, runner up in the 1985 Melbourne Cup
- La Souvronne, winner of the 1984 AJC Oaks
- Lurestina, winner of the 1992 New Zealand Stakes
- Miltak, winner of the 1993 New Zealand Oaks and 1994 Auckland Cup
- Morar, winner of the 1992 Telegraph Handicap
- Mr Tiz winner of seven Group One races including the Galaxy Stakes & Waikato Sprint in 1991, the Railway Stakes three times (1989–91) and the Telegraph Handicap twice (1989, 1990)
- Nimue, winner of the 1992 New Zealand 1000 Guineas and Levin Classic
- Oopik, winner of the 1973 Hawke's Bay Guineas and 1976 New Zealand International Stakes & Sydney Cup
- O'Reilly, winner of the 1996 Levin Classic and 1997 Telegraph Handicap
- Our Shah, winner of the 1982 Easter Handicap
- Popsy, winner of the 1993 New Zealand Derby
- Shivaree, winner of the 1979 New Zealand International Stakes, Tancred Stakes & Queen Elizabeth Stakes (ATC) and 1981 Easter Handicap
- Silver Tip, winner of the 1986 Railway Handicap
- Snap, winner of the 1993 Manawatu Sires Produce Stakes & New Zealand 1000 Guineas and 1994 New Zealand Oaks & Enerco Stakes and 1991 Waikato Sprint
- Surfers Paradise, winner of the 1990 New Zealand 2000 Guineas & New Zealand Derby and 1991 New Zealand Stakes, Rosehill Guineas & Cox Plate
- Vialli, winner of the 1996 Enerco Stakes and 1998 Japan Racing Association Classic as well as placing 2nd in the 1996 Australian Cup and 3rd in the 1997 Cox Plate
- Waverley Star, winner of the 1986 Auckland Classic and 1987 Chipping Norton Stakes as well as runner up to Bonecrusher in the 1986 Cox Plate commonly known as the Race of the Century

== See also ==
- Murray Baker
- Colin Jillings
- Trevor McKee
- Graeme Rogerson
- Thoroughbred racing in New Zealand
