= Murray Baker =

New Zealand thoroughbred racehorse trainer and representative cricketer

Personal information
- Born: 21 April 1946 (age 80); Napier, New Zealand
- Source: Cricinfo, 29 October 2020

Murray Baker (born 21 April 1946) is a New Zealand thoroughbred racehorse trainer and former representative cricketer.

== Cricket ==
Baker played in one List A and seventeen first-class matches for Central Districts and Northern Districts from 1966 to 1975. Baker was part of the team who won the Plunket Shield and played for Huddersfield in England.

== Horse training ==
Baker started training at Woodville in the 1970s. His first raceday winner was Vizier on October 4 1978, at Otaki. Another early winner was Sir Vigilant in the 1985 New Zealand St. Leger. In 2000 Murray moved his training operation to Cambridge.

He has trained in partnership with:

- his son, Bjorn Baker, who later moved to set up stables of his own at Warwick Farm Racecourse in Sydney, Australia.
- Andrew Forsman.

Murray has won many major races on both sides of the Tasman with leading horses such as:

- Bonneval, twice New Zealand Horse of the Year, winner of the 2017 Australian Oaks, Feehan Stakes, New Zealand Oaks and Underwood Stakes
- Dal Cielo, winner of the 2015 Ellerslie Sires Produce Stakes
- Dundeel, winner of the Australian Triple Crown of Thoroughbred Racing
- Harris Tweed, winner of the 2009 Tulloch Stakes and 2010 The Bart Cummings, placed 2nd in the 2009 AJC Derby and 2010 Caulfield Cup
- Jon Snow, winner of the 2017 Tulloch Stakes and Australian Derby
- Lickety Split, winner of the 2022 Sistema Stakes
- Lion Tamer, winner of the 2010 Victoria Derby.
- Lizzie L’Amour, winner of the 2018 Herbie Dyke Stakes
- Mongolian Khan, winner of the 2015 New Zealand Derby, AJC Derby and Caulfield Cup
- My Eagle Eye, winner of the 1992 Sydney Cup
- Nom Du Jeu, winner of the 2008 AJC Derby
- Quick Thinker, winner of the 2019 Ming Dynasty Quality Handicap, 2020 Australian Derby & Tulloch Stakes and 2021 Chairman's Handicap (ATC)
- Staring, winner of the 1991 Desert Gold Stakes, 1992 New Zealand Oaks and 1993 Bluebird Foods Classic
- Stolen Dance, winner of the 2018 Thorndon Mile
- The Phantom, winner of the 1990 Memsie Stakes and Underwood Stakes. Placed 3rd in the 1989 Caulfield Cup and 2nd in the 1990 Melbourne Cup
- The Chosen One, winner of the 2022 Thorndon Mile
- Turn Me Loose, winner of the 2014 New Zealand 2000 Guineas, 2015 Crystal Mile, Seymour Cup, Emirates Stakes and 2016 Futurity Stakes (MRC)
- Vin De Dance, winner of the 2018 New Zealand Derby

Murray retired from training in May 2022. During his career he had accumulated:

- over 1800 New Zealand winners.
- approximately 60 winners in Australia.
- 270 stakes and group race wins (including 48 in Australia).
- 57 Group One wins (including 22 in Australia).
- 9 Derbies and 5 Oaks victories.
- 4 New Zealand training premierships.
- 5 New Zealand trainer of the year awards.

Murray is a member of the New Zealand Racing Hall of Fame.

== See also ==
- Opie Bosson
- Roger James
- Mike Moroney
- Dave O'Sullivan
- Lance O'Sullivan
- Jamie Richards
- Chris Waller
- Thoroughbred racing in New Zealand
