= Lance O'Sullivan =

New Zealand jockey (born 1963)

Lance O'Sullivan ONZM
Personal information
- Born: 28 August 1963 (age 63) New Zealand
- Occupation: Jockey

Horse racing career
- Sport: Horse racing
- Career wins: 2479

Major racing wins
- AJC Oaks (1984); Telegraph Handicap (1982, 1985, 1989, 1990, 1997, 1999, 2002); Easter Handicap (1985, 1997, 2002); Railway Stakes (1986, 1990, 1991, 1994, 2003); New Zealand Stakes (1987, 1991); Canterbury Guineas (1987); Chipping Norton Stakes (1987); New Zealand St. Leger (1987); New Zealand 1000 Guineas (1988, 1992, 1993); Captain Cook Stakes (1988, 1999, 2000); DB Draught Classic (1989, 1990); LKS MacKinnon Stakes (1989); Japan Cup (1989); New Zealand Derby (1990, 1993); South Australian Derby (1990); Thorndon Mile (1991, 1993, 2003); Waikato Sprint (1991, 1995); Rosehill Guineas (1991); The Galaxy (1991); Cox Plate (1991); Otaki-Maori Weight for Age (1992, 1993, 2003); New Zealand 2000 Guineas (1992); Levin Classic (1992, 1996); Queensland Derby (1992); Queensland Oaks (1992); Auckland Cup (1993, 1994); New Zealand Oaks (1994, 1999); Avondale Cup (1996); Wellington Cup (1997, 2002); New Zealand International Stakes (1997); Manawatu Sires Produce Stakes (2000, 2003); Kelt Capital Stakes (2001); Ellerslie Sires Produce Stakes (2003)

Honours
- New Zealand Racing Hall of Fame (2006)

Significant horses
- Horlicks, Mr Tiz, Surfers Paradise, Popsy, Waverley Star, Snap

Lance Anthony O'Sullivan ONZM (born 28 August 1963) is a New Zealand Thoroughbred horse trainer and former champion jockey.

Lance is the son of premiership winning horse trainer Dave O’Sullivan and the brother of Paul O'Sullivan.

== Riding career ==
Lance O’Sullivan's first ride was on 12 June 1980 when he rode Her Highness to win the Arapuni Handicap at Te Awamutu, a horse trained by his father.

O'Sullivan retired from riding in 2003 with a record 2358 New Zealand winners. In addition to this total he rode a further 121 winners offshore in places as diverse as Australia, Hong Kong, Japan, Macau, Singapore and Turkey. When he retired O'Sullivan was credited with winning: 12 New Zealand Jockey's Premierships (a record), having broken Bill Broughton's long-standing record of 11 and 62 GP1 winners. His biggest win as a jockey was the 1989 Japan Cup on champion mare Horlicks, breaking the world record for 2400m.

Despite a number of attempts O'Sullivan was never quite able to win the Race That Stops The Nation: the Melbourne Cup. He came agonisingly close in 1985 when run down in the final few strides on Koiro Corrie May by What A Nuisance. He was also jockey of Waverley Star, who was unfortunate to run into the champion Bonecrusher, in the 1986 Cox Plate. Dubbed the "Race of the Century" Waverley Star finished a gallant second, after a 2 horse war with Bonecrusher from the 800m, only succumbing to the champion in the last few strides. He did achieve redemption, courtesy of Surfers Paradise, the previous seasons New Zealand Derby winner, who looped the field on the home turn to win the 1991 running of the Cox Plate.

In the 2003 New Year Honours, O'Sullivan was appointed an Officer of the New Zealand Order of Merit, for services to thoroughbred racing.

In 2006, O'Sullivan was part of the inaugural class inducted in the New Zealand Racing Hall of Fame.

== Training career ==
Lance O'Sullivan's father, Dave, founded the Wexford Stables at Matamata. Lance's brother, Paul, trained in partnership with their father before moving to Hong Kong Jockey Club in 2004.

Starting in the 2006–07 season Lance O'Sullivan has trained in partnership with Andrew Scott who previously worked in partnership with Mike Moroney at Ballymore Stables.

Key successes include:

- Ohope Wins - winner of the 2026 New Zealand Oaks, 2025/2026 New Zealand Bloodstock Filly of the Year, and 2025/2026 New Zealand Stayer of the Year
- Grail Seeker - dual Group 1 winner including the 2024 Tarzino Trophy and 2025 TAB Telegraph Handicap
- Waitak - five time Group 1 winner including the 2023 Railway Handicap, 2025 Howden Insurance Mile, 2025 Spring Classic (Livamol Classic), 2026 Howden Insurance Mile, and 2026 Livamol Classic
- Molly Bloom - winner of the 2023 New Zealand 1000 Guineas, and 2023/2024 New Zealand Bloodstock Filly of the Year
- Asterix - winner of the 2022 New Zealand Derby
- Dark Destroyer - winner of the 2022 Tarzino Trophy
- Rocket Spade - winner of the 2021 New Zealand Derby
- Force of Will - winner of the 2021 Desert Gold Stakes
- Dragon Leap - winner of the 2020 Auckland Guineas
- Summer Passage - winner of the 2017 Sistema Stakes
- Willie Cazals - winner of the 2016 Spring Classic (Livamol Classic)
- Pure Champion - winner of the 2014 Windsor Park Plate
- Pentane - winner of the 2006 Auckland Cup

== See also ==
- Thoroughbred racing in New Zealand
- Jim Cassidy
- Shane Dye
- Noel Harris
- Chris Johnson
- Michael Walker
- David Walsh
