= Telegraph Handicap =

- Class: Group I
- Location: Trentham Racecourse; Wellington, New Zealand
- Inaugurated: 1891
- Race type: Thoroughbred - Flat racing
- Website: www.trentham.co.nz

Race information
- Distance: 1200m (6 furlongs)
- Surface: Turf
- Track: Left-handed
- Qualification: Three-year-olds and up
- Weight: Set Weights & Penalties
- Purse: NZ$550,000 (2026)

The Telegraph Handicap is a Group One New Zealand horse race contested by the Wellington Racing Club at Trentham Racecourse in Upper Hutt. It was traditionally raced during the Wellington Cup carnival in mid-January, however from 2025 it has been shifted to earlier in January.

The Telegraph Handicap, raced over 1200 metres, and the Railway Stakes contested at Ellerslie Racecourse are New Zealand's premier sprint races.

In the late 1980s the race was called the Wrightson Handicap.

The nature of the Trentham track ensures fast times and some Telegraph Handicap winners have been able to lay claim to world record times over 1200m.

== 1954 racebook ==
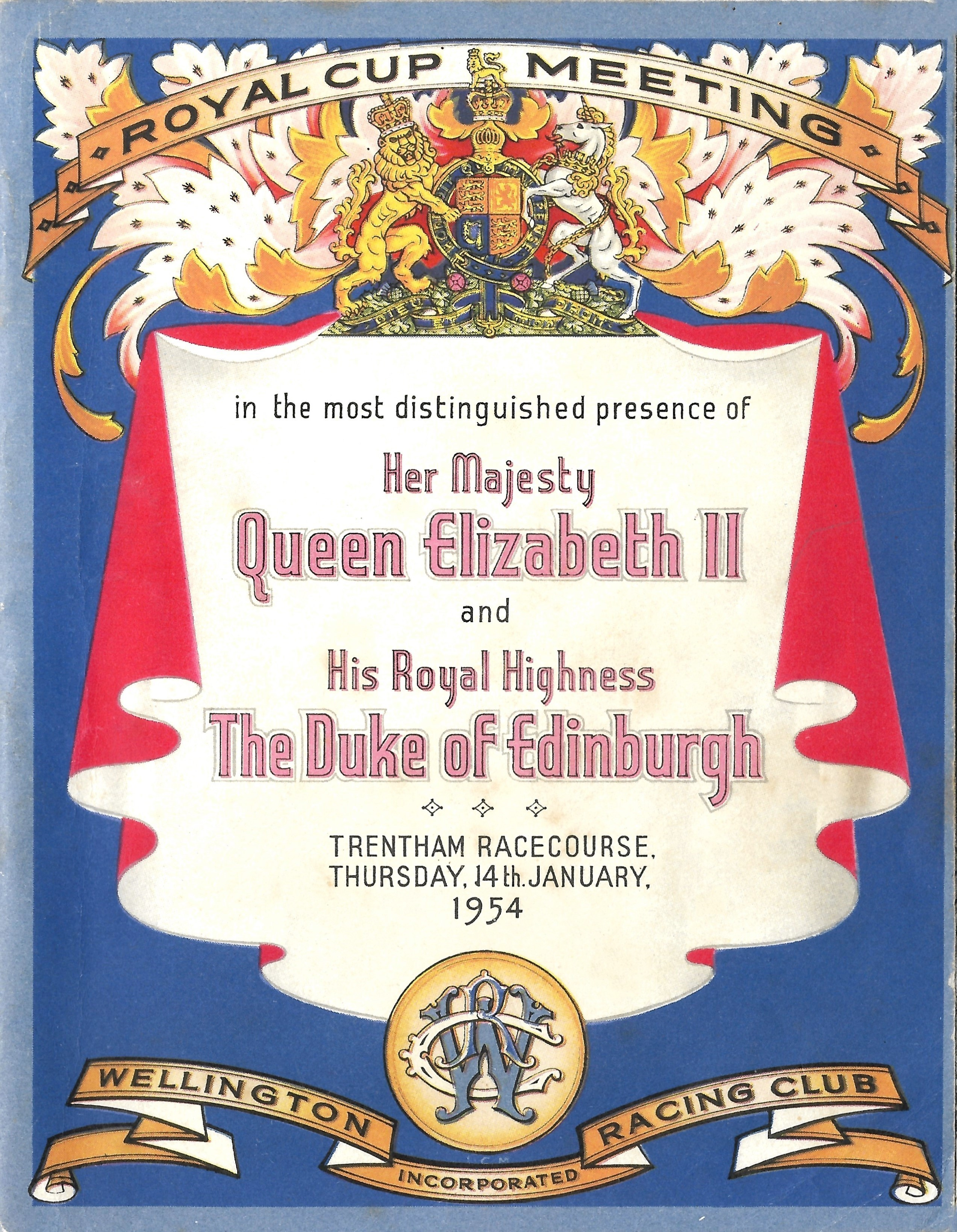
1954 WRC Wellington Cup racebook front cover

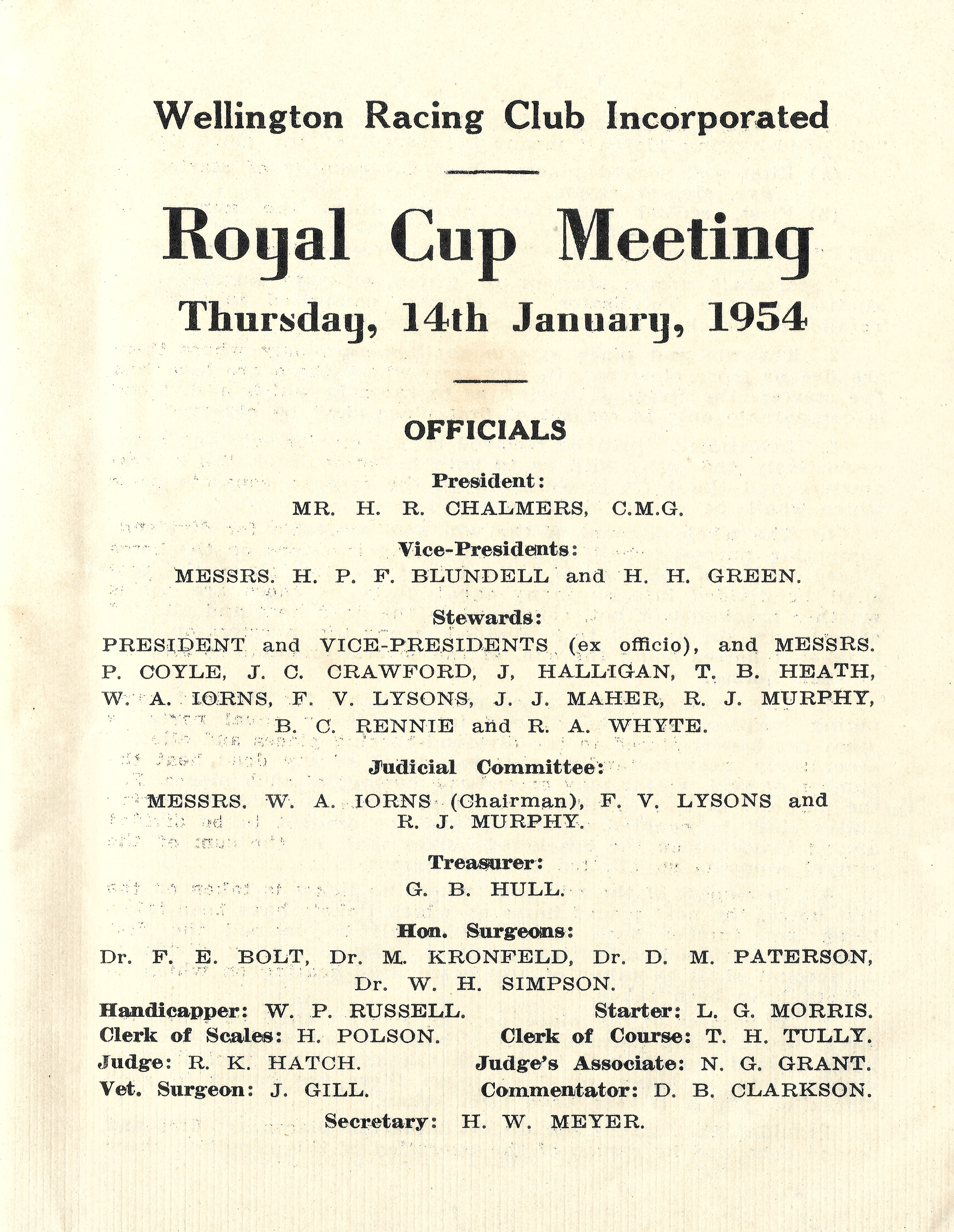
1954 WRC Wellington Cup raceday officials

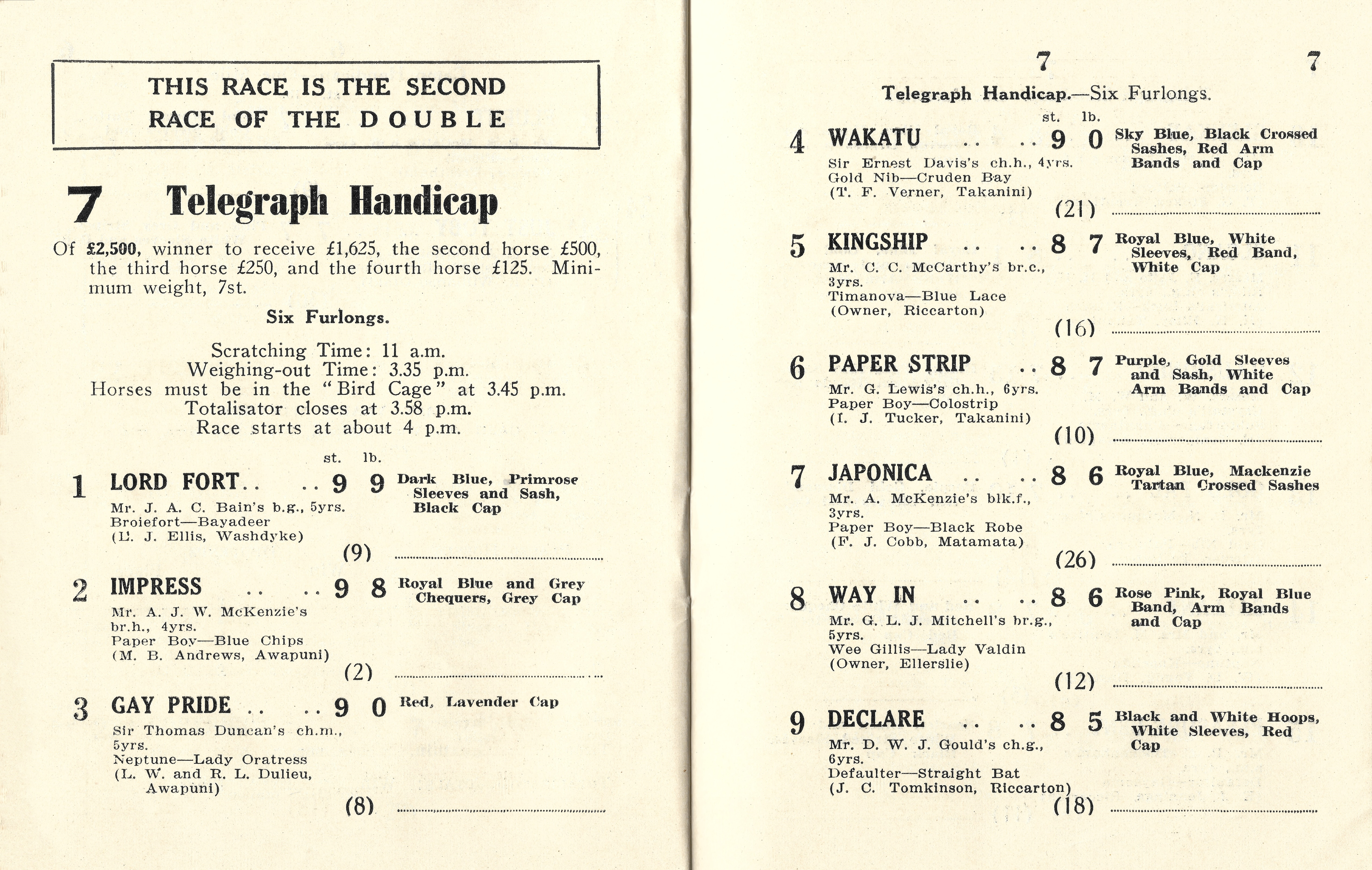
1954 WRC Telegraph Handicap page starters and results

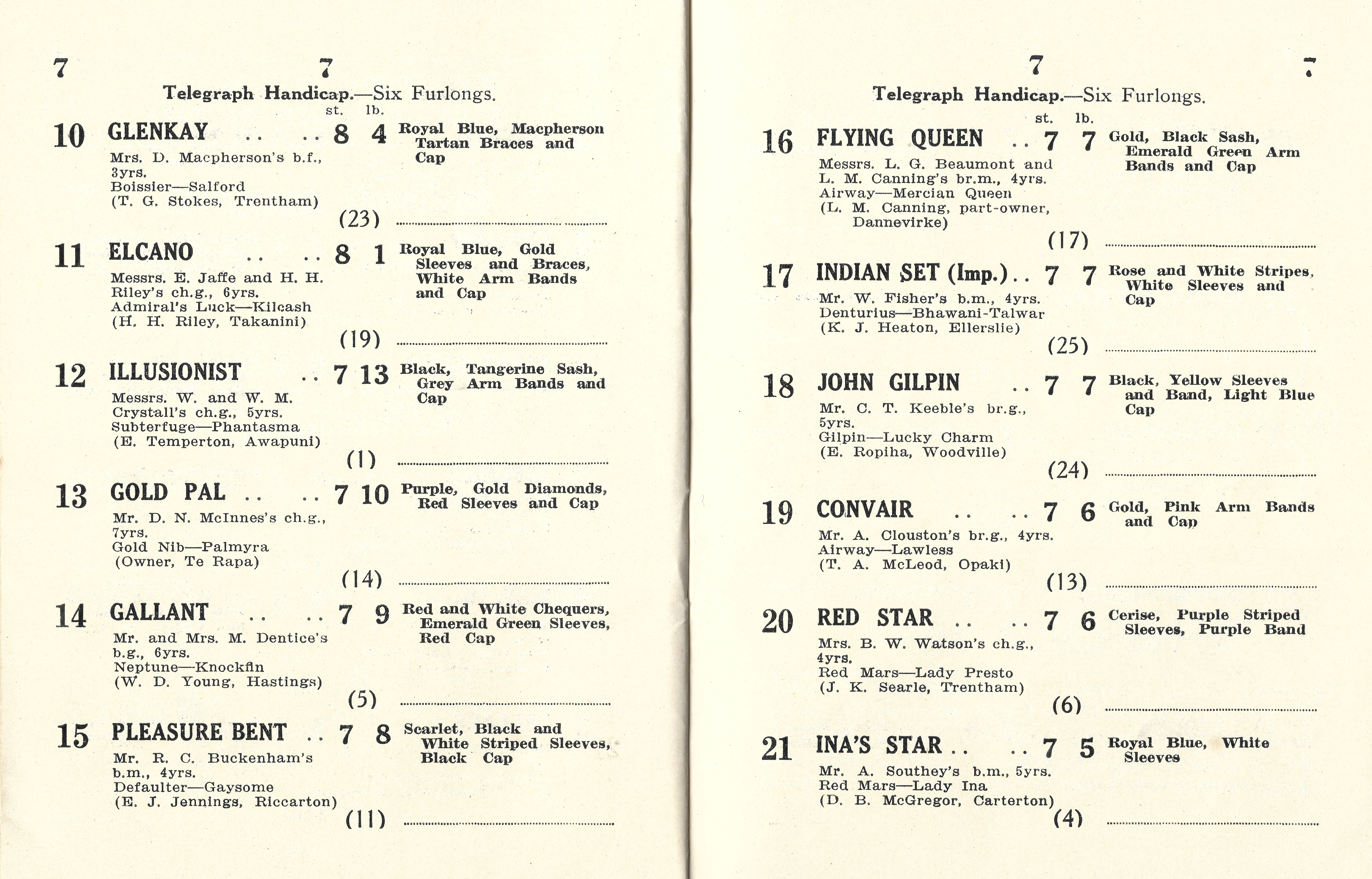
1954 WRC Telegraph Handicap page showing the winner, John Gilpin

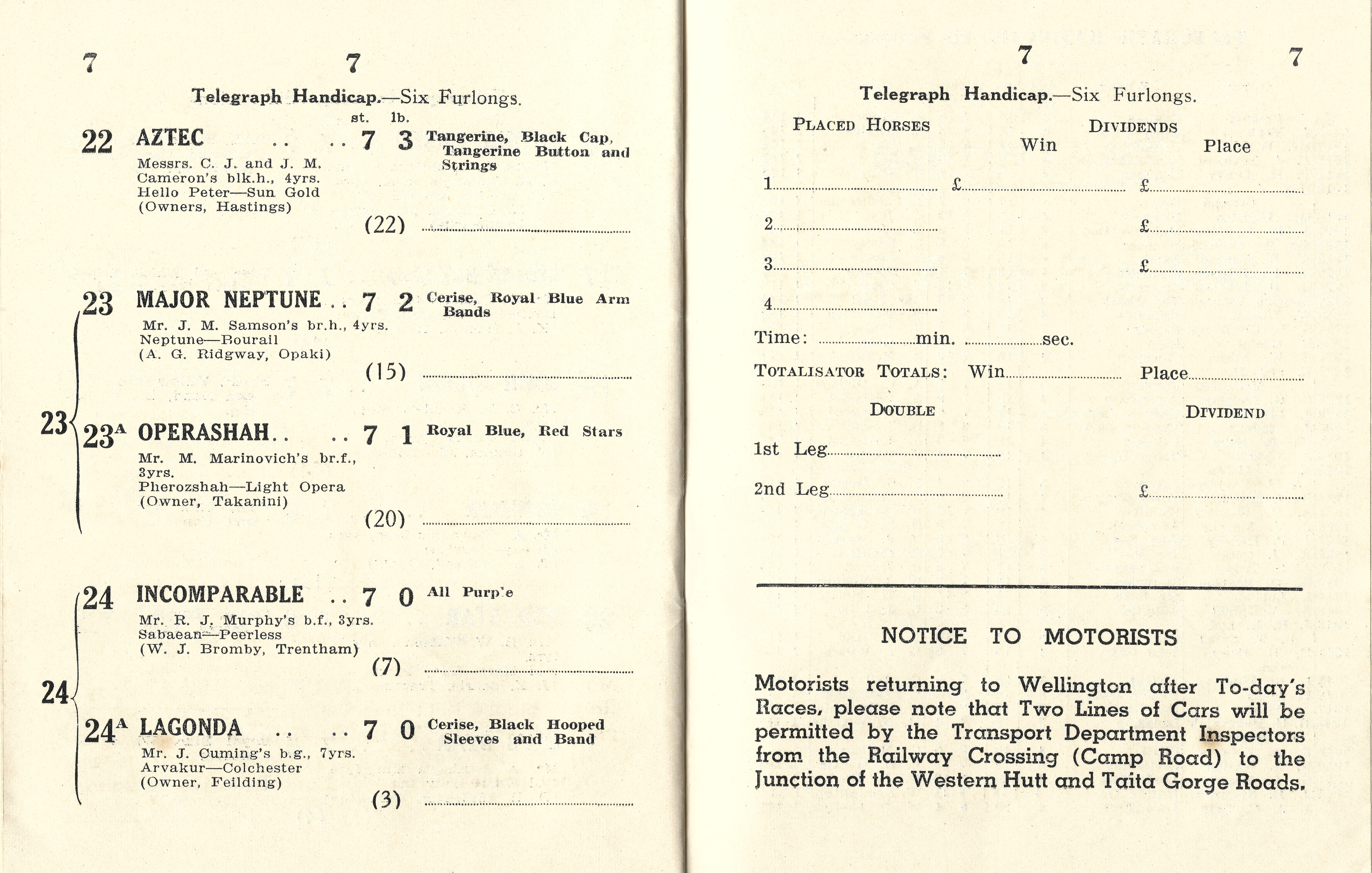
1954 WRC Telegraph Handicap page starters and results

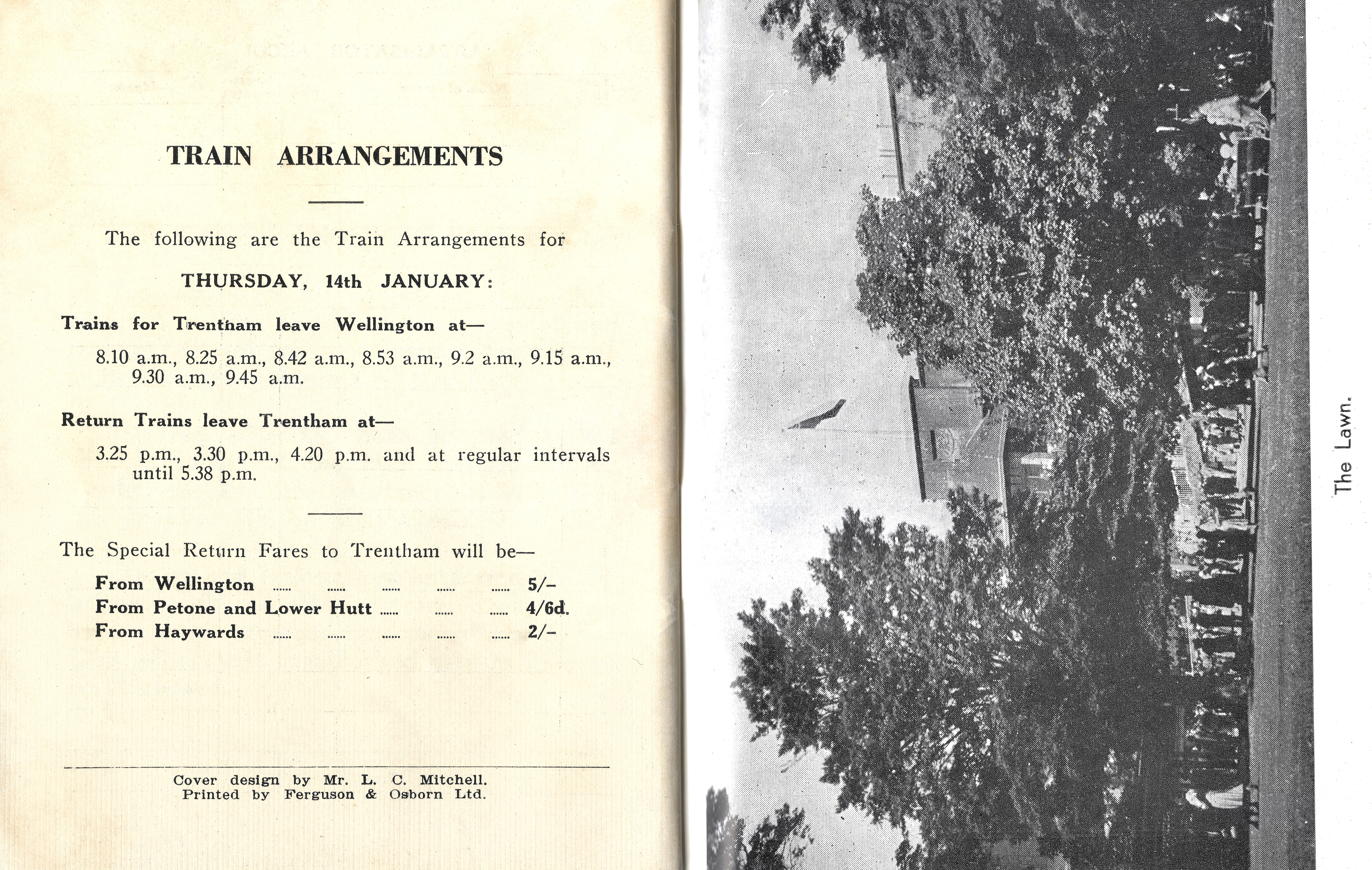
1954 WRC Wellington Cup train arrangements

== Previous winners ==
Year	Winner	Sire	Dam	Jockey	Trainer(s)	Time	Second	Third
2026	First Five 58.5	Almanzor	Payette	Wiremu Pinn	David Greene	1:07.23 (soft)	Navigator 58.5	Grail Seeker 56.5
2025	Grail Seeker 56.5	Iffraaj (GB)	Starwish (Aus)	Kevin Stott	Lance O'Sullivan & Andrew Scott	1.07.71 (soft)	Sacred Satono 58.5	Navigator 58.5
2024	Mercurial 58.5	Burgundy (NZ)	Roxette (NZ)	Samantha Spratt	Stephen Marsh	1:08.51 (good)	Express Yourself 56.5	Bonny Lass 56.5
2023	Levante 56.5	Proisir (Aus)	Island Doy (GB)	Ryan Elliot	Ken & Bev Kelso	1:07.11 (good)	Babylon Berlin 56.5	Ifndoubtgetout 58.5
2022	Levante 56.5	Proisir (Aus)	Island Doy (GB)	Ryan Elliott	Ken & Bev Kelso	1:06.18 (good)	Roch 'N' Horse 56.5	Mascarpone 58.5
2021	Avantage 56.5	Fastnet Rock (Aus)	Asavant (NZ)	Danielle Johnson	Jamie Richards	1:06.97 (good)	Spring Heat 56.5	Burgundy Belle 56.5
2020	Avantage 56.5	Fastnet Rock (Aus)	Asavant (NZ)	Opie Bosson	Jamie Richards	1:07.04 (good)	Enzo's Lad 58.5	Spring Heat 56.5
2019	Enzo's Lad 58	Testa Rossa (Aus)	Sheerama (Aus)	Michael McNab	Michael & Matthew Pitman	1:06.95 (good)	Ferrando 55.5	Sensei 55.5
2018	Enzo's Lad 55.5	Testa Rossa (Aus)	Sheerama (Aus)	Sam Weatherley	Michael & Matthew Pitman	1:08.30 (good)	Kawi 59	Ferrando 55.5
2017	Signify 55	Perfectly Ready (Aus)	Pica Pica (NZ)	Racha Cuneen	Alex Cowan, Ashburton	1:07.71	Start Wondering 58	Perfect Fit 56
2016	Adventador 55.5	Fast 'N' Famous (Aus)	Alpine Beauty (NZ)	Matt Cameron	Gus Lowry & Grant Cullen	1:08.34	Miss Seton Sands 53.5	Trepidation 53
2015	Sacred Star 57	Flying Spur (Aus)	Irish Nova (NZ)	Vinnie Colgan	Tony Pike	1:07.71	Designated Driver 53	Trepidation 53
2014	Irish Fling 52	Darci Brahma (NZ)	Irish Belle (NZ)	Mark Du Plessis	Gus Lowry & Grant Cullen	1:07.48	Natuzzi 54.5	Jaggard 52
2013	Final Touch 58	Kashani (USA)	My Lydia (Aus)	Chris Johnson	John & Karen Parsons	1:08.53	Xanadu 55	Burgundy 55
2012	Guiseppina 53	Johar (USA)	Battocchi (NZ)	James McDonald	Steven Ramsay & Julia Ritchie, Maungatautari	1:06.94	Atomic Force 59	El Chico 55
2011	Mufhasa 56.5	Pentire	Sheila Cheval (NZ)	Samantha Spratt	Stephen McKee, Ardmore	1:07.04	First Command 58.5	Coup Align 56.5
2010	Vonusti 52.5	Ustinov (Aus)	Reasonably (Aus)	Noel Harris	Tim & Margaret Carter	1:09.36	Tootsie 52.5	Stupendous 52.5
2009	Mufhasa 55.5	Pentire	Sheila Cheval (NZ)	Samantha Spratt	Stephen McKee, Ardmore	1:07.39	Atapi 55	Ruud Van Slaats 53.5
2008	Seachange 58.5	Cape Cross (Ire)	Just Cruising (Aus)	Gavin McKeon	Ralph Manning, Cambridge	1:06.66	Kay's Awake 55	Maximum Star 52
2007	Darci Brahma 57	Danehill (USA)	Grand Echezeaux (NZ)	Opie Bosson	Mark Walker	1:07.00	Seachange 55.5	Kay's Awake 53
2006	Gee I Jane 55.5	Jahafil (GB)	Miss Distinction (NZ)	Scott Seamer	Neville Couchman, Cambridge	1:07.77	Dezigna 52.5	Magistra Decta 53
2005	Keeninsky 50.5	Stravinsky (USA)	So Keen (NZ)	Allan Peard	Graeme Rogerson & Stephen Autridge, Tuhikaramea	1:07.55	Sedecrem 56.5	Dezigna 50.5
2004	King's Chapel	King of Kings (Ire)	Lower Chapel (GB)	Noel Harris	Mark Walker	1:06.79	Sunlaw	Sedecrem
2003	Tit For Taat 58.5	Faltaat (USA)	Miss Kiwitea (NZ)	Michael Walker	Anne Herbert	1:07.64	Egyptian Raine 58	Fair Embrace 54
2002	Vinaka 52.5	Volksraad (GB)	Shepherd's Delight (NZ)	Lance O'Sullivan	Jim Gibbs	1:08.06	Life Of Riley 52	Spring Rain 54
2001	Star Of Gold 53	Famous Star (GB)	Goldtaine (NZ)	Peter D Johnson	Stephen & Trevor McKee	1:07.76	Spring Rain 53	Travellin' Man 52.5
2000	Fritz 53	Kreisler (Ire)	Brighten Up (GB)	Noel Harris	Neil Coulbeck, Leithfield	1:07.63	Cheiron 54	Star Of Gold 54
1999	Bawalaksana 52	Straight Strike (USA)	Princess Jocinda (NZ)	Lance O'Sullivan	Paul O’Sullivan	1:06.51	Buster Brookfield 52	Samboa 53
1998	Vegas 51.5	Kaapstad (NZ)	Some Jewel (Aus)	Opie Bosson	Graeme Rogerson & Keith Hawtin	1:08.85	Kiora Star 52	Coogee Walk 53
1997	O'Reilly 49	Last Tycoon (Ire)	Courtza (NZ)	Lance O'Sullivan	Dave & Paul O’Sullivan, Matamata	1:07.36	Classic Royal 49	Krispin Klear 55.5
1996	Loader 55	Pre Catelan (Aus)	Rhapsody Rose (NZ)	Chris Johnson	Peter J & Dawn M Williams	1:06.85	Sun Spot 55	Snap 50
1995	Lord Tridan 57	Lord Ballina (Aus)	Salaprime (NZ)	Tony Allan	Michael Moroney, Matamata	1:07.06	Rampage 48.5	Saxonvale 54.5
1994	Lady Madonna 50	Kingdom Bay (NZ)	Donna's Habit (NZ)	Jim O'Styke	Grant Searle	1:10.40	Enhancer 51.5	Lord Tridan 56
1993	Victory Dias 49.5	Avon's Lord (NZ)	My Totara Lass (NZ)	Craig Beets	C W & Jim Gibbs & Lance Noble	1:06.59	Lord Tridan 51	Javelin 56
1992	Morar 52.5	Otehi Bay (Aus)	Hinewai (NZ)	Larry Cassidy	Dave & Paul O’Sullivan	1:08.91	Mrs Selleck 49.75	Romanee Conti 47
1991	Vain Sovereign 52	Truly Vain (Aus)	Sherwyn's Gold (NZ)	Brian Hibberd	M R Campbell	1:08.31	Mr Tiz 60.5	Hypervain 50
1990	Mr Tiz 55.5	Bletchingly (Aus)	Yir Tiz (NZ)	Lance O'Sullivan	Dave & Paul O’Sullivan	1:07.99	Vain Sovereign 52	Zephyr Magic 55.5
1989	Mr Tiz 50.5 (dead heat)	Bletchingly (Aus)	Yir Tiz (NZ)	Lance O'Sullivan	Dave & Paul O’Sullivan	1:07.66	-	Sirstaci 50
1989	Festal 49 (dead heat)	Vain (Aus)	Party (Aus)	Larry Cassidy	Bruce Marsh	1:07.66	-	Sirstaci 50
1988	Courier Bay 58	Diplomatic Agent (USA)	Bay Ruth (NZ)	David Walsh	G A White	1:07.45	Sirstaci 49.5	Squire Gray 47.5
1987	Courier Bay 54.5	Diplomatic Agent (USA)	Bay Ruth (NZ)	David Walsh	G A White	1:07.45	Kosha 57	Knight Invader 50
1986	Tanalyse 54.5	Alvaro (GB)	Ventian Topaz (GB)	David Walsh	D Grubb	1:07.35	Princess Dram 53	Silver Tip 51.5
1985	High Regards 48.5	Trictrac (Fra)	Savarnah (NZ)	Lance O'Sullivan	Dave & Paul O’Sullivan, Matamata	1:07.23	Romantic Bay 48.5	Clear Gold 56.5
1984	Mac's Gamble 53	Shifnal (Aus)	Mac's Bonnie (NZ)	Debbie Healey	M M Phillips	1:08.45	Pinson 55.5	Atrapar 54.5
1983	So Modest 49.5	So Vain (Aus)	Darilyn Kaye (NZ)	Greg Childs	K, KR & N Crawford	1:07.52	Diplomante 54	So Dandy 56
1982	Our Shah 55	Shahram (GB)	Our Rene (NZ)	Lance O'Sullivan	Dave & Paul O’Sullivan & Mike Moroney	1:09.52	Diplomante 55	Anderil 55
1981	Anderil 54.5	Hasty Cloud (Ire)	Charsada (NZ)	C McNab	Dave & Paul O’Sullivan & Mike Moroney	1:07.50	Diplomante 49.5	Valencia 52.5
1980	Flying View 54	Country Dance (GB)	Loch View (NZ)	S Laming	K H Pratt	1:09.50	Anderil 48.5	Silver Nymph 50
1979	Arbre Chene 57	Oakville (GB)	Marija Jean (NZ)	R D Vance	P K Cathro	1:09.75	Pennevari 48.5	Purple Kiwi 52
1978	Extra Flash 47	Serenader II (Ire)	Princess Nike (NZ)	S R Autridge	H W Mathews	1:09.75	Sly Wink 50.5	Heidelberg 49.5

== Wellington Racing Club ==
Other major races held at Trentham include the:

- Wellington Cup
- Levin Classic
- Thorndon Mile
- Desert Gold Stakes.

== See also ==
- Recent winners of major NZ sprint races
- Railway Stakes
- Waikato Sprint
