= Trentham Racecourse =

Racecourse in Wellington, New Zealand

Coordinates: 41°08′23″S 175°02′32″E

Trentham Racecourse is the main thoroughbred horse racecourse for the Wellington city area in New Zealand. It is located in the suburb of Trentham in Upper Hutt, next to Trentham Military Camp.

The races are conducted by the Wellington Racing Club.

The first race meeting was held there in January 1906.

In November 2022 it was reported that a $12.4 million investment from the New Zealand Government's Infrastructure Acceleration Fund would be used in a new 850 home housing development and shopping centre on Trentham Racecourse land. Mayor of Upper Hutt and Wellington Racing Club president Wayne Guppy said it would future proof the Club allowing it to upgrade its facilities and continue to operate, as well as boosting the Upper Hutt economy. Tim Savell, the chief executive of RACE Incorporated, which administers racing clubs in the lower North Island, including the Wellington Racing Club, said the proposed work would provide the club with income and much needed new facilities.

== Main races ==
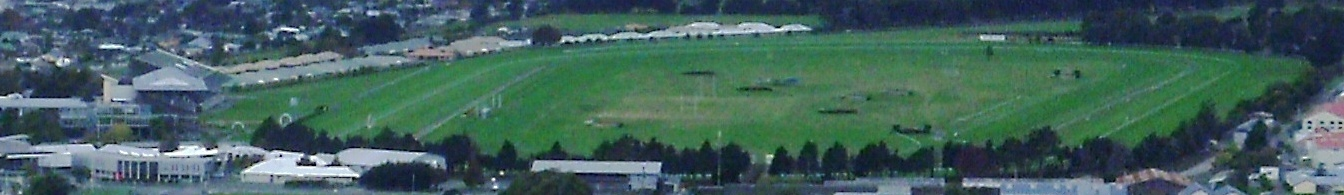
Trentham Racecourse

January

- G1 Levin Classic; 1600m in January for 3 year olds.
- G1 Telegraph Handicap; a 1200m open race.
- G1 Thorndon Mile; 1600m.
- G3 Anniversary Handicap; 1600m open handicap.
- G3 Desert Gold Stakes; 1600m for 3 year old fillies.
- G3 Wellington Cup; 3200m (previously 2400m).
- G3 Trentham Stakes; 2100m open – set weight & penalties.

March

- G2 Wellington Guineas; 1400m for 3 year olds.
- G1 New Zealand Oaks; 2400m for 3 year old fillies.
- New Zealand St. Leger; 2500m

July

- The Wellington Steeplechase over 5500m.
- The Wellington Hurdles over 3400m.

December

- G2 Wakefield Challenge Stakes; 1100m for 2 year olds.
- G1 Captain Cook Stakes; 1600m.

Trentham was also the venue for the Wellington Derby between 1966 and 1986. Linda Jones won the 1979 Wellington Derby on Holy Toledo, likely becoming the first woman rider to win a Derby anywhere on the world.

== See also ==
- Thoroughbred racing in New Zealand
- Ellerslie Racecourse
- Riccarton Park Racecourse
- Tauherenikau Racecourse
