= Paul O'Sullivan (horseman) =

Paul David O'Sullivan (born 6 December 1959) is a New Zealand Thoroughbred racehorse trainer.

O'Sullivan trained in partnership with his father, Dave O’Sullivan, for 17 years in New Zealand, and was the champion trainer in New Zealand on 11 occasions. He is the brother of New Zealand premiership-winning jockey Lance O'Sullivan.

O'Sullivan moved to Hong Kong to train in 2004. In 2010/11, O'Sullivan brought up his double century of winners in Hong Kong. In 2022, he finished there with 516 wins and total earnings of HK$525,837,109.

== Significant horses ==
- Aerovelocity (Naisoso Warrior), winner of the 2014 and 2016 Hong Kong Sprint, 2015 KrisFlyer International Sprint and Takamatsunomiya Kinen, 2016 Centenary Sprint Cup
- Coogee Walk, winner of the 1998 Railway Stakes
- Ensign Ewart, winner of the 1994 Railway Stakes
- Fellowship, winner of the 2010 Hong Kong Stewards' Cup
- High Regards, winner of the 1985 Telegraph Handicap
- Horlicks, winner of the 1989 Japan Cup
- Miltak, winner of the 1994 Auckland Cup and BMW Stakes
- Morar, winner of the 1992 Telegraph Handicap
- Mr Tiz, winner of the 1989, 1990 and 1991 Railway Stakes, 1989 and 1990 Telegraph Handicap, 1991 Waikato Sprint, 1991 The Galaxy (ATC)
- Nimue, winner of the 1992 Levin Classic
- O'Reilly, winner of the 1996 Levin Classic, 1997 Telegraph Handicap
- Popsy, winner of the 1993 New Zealand Derby
- Silver Tip, winner of the 1986 Railway Stakes
- Snap, winner of the 1994 New Zealand Oaks & 1995 Waikato Sprint
- Surfers Paradise, winner of the 1990 New Zealand Derby and 1991 Cox Plate
- Vital King, winner of the 2007 Hong Kong Derby
- Waverley Star

== See also ==
- Thoroughbred racing in New Zealand
