= Opie Bosson =

New Zealand jockey

Opie Bosson ONZM
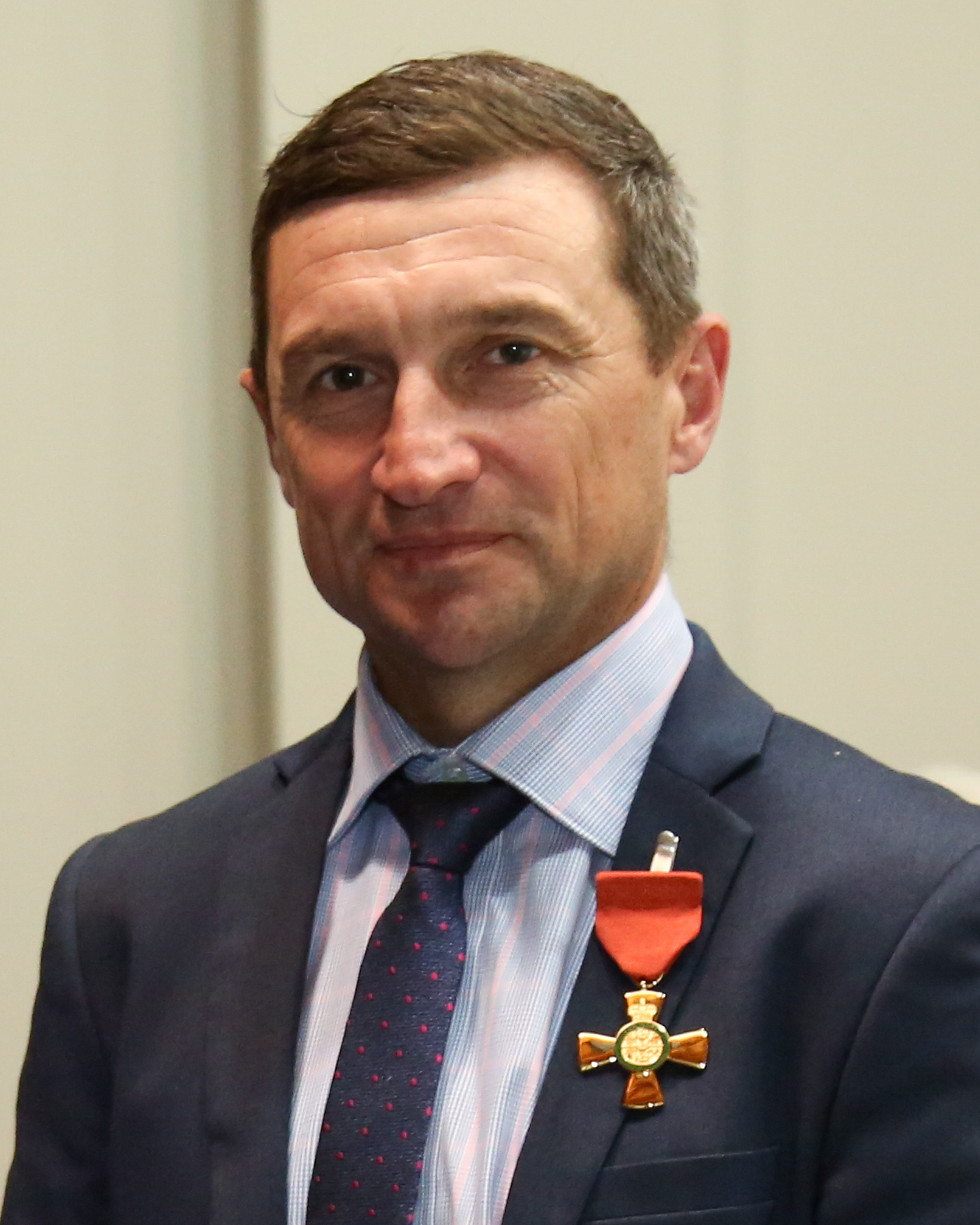
- Bosson in 2023

Personal information
- Full name: Owen Patrick Bosson
- Born: 24 July 1980 (age 46) New Zealand
- Occupation: Jockey
- Spouse: Emily Murphy (2017-2024)

Horse racing career
- Sport: Horse racing

Significant horses
- Avantage; Gingernuts; Melody Belle; Mongolian Khan; Grand Archway; Probabeel; Quick Thinker; Te Akau Shark; Imperatriz

Owen Patrick "Opie" Bosson ONZM (born 24 July 1980) is a jockey in Thoroughbred racing in New Zealand.

== Riding career ==
Bosson started as an apprentice for Stephen Autridge, his godfather. He began his race-day riding career as a 15 year old on 25 October 1995 with Comette at Dargaville and soon after had his first win on Fairlie Airlie at Gisborne.

In the 1997 season he was the McBeath Apprentice of the Year at the BMW New Zealand Thoroughbred Racing Awards and was eighth on the New Zealand Premiership, behind Lance O'Sullivan, with 75 wins from 703 starts. The next apprentice was Mark Sweeney on 53 wins.

On 2 September 1998 Bosson rode the first Australian winner for Chris Waller, Party Belle, in a 2100m maiden race at Wyong.

His first Group 1 victory was Jezabeel in the 1998 Auckland Cup, aged 17.

In March 2019 Bosson surpassed the record of Lance O'Sullivan as the winner of the most New Zealand Group 1 races, with 63 when Melody Belle won the New Zealand Stakes at Ellerslie.

As at the end of the 2021 season, Bosson had won:

- over 1,800 New Zealand races.
- 78 Group 1 races (10 in Australia).

In the 2023 King's Birthday and Coronation Honours, Bosson was appointed an Officer of the New Zealand Order of Merit, for services to Thoroughbred racing.

In December 2023 Bosson became the eighth jockey to record 2000 New Zealand wins when riding Move To Strike to win at Te Rapa. The other seven jockeys to reach that mark were Chris Johnson, David Walsh, Lance O'Sullivan, Noel Harris, Bill Skelton, Michael Coleman and David Peake.

In March 2024 Bosson told New Zealand Herald journalist Chris Rattue that his:

- favourite horse was Imperatriz
- most memorable race was winning the Caulfield Cup with Mongolian Khan
- favourite opponent was James McDonald.

In December 2024 Bosson announced his retirement from race riding. He finished his career with:

- 2146 wins, 2059 in New Zealand
- 99 Group 1 victories in New Zealand and Australia
- 51 wins, including 16 Group 1 races, in Australia
- 31 wins, including 2 Group 1 races, in Singapore

In July 2025 Bosson indicated he would return to raceday riding.

On 7 February 2026 he won his 100th Group 1 race on the back of Legarto at Te Rapa.

== Personal life ==
Opie Bosson is the son of Owen and Glenda Bosson. Owen was a prominent amateur jockey.

At the end of 2017, Bosson married TAB Trackside Television presenter Emily Murphy. They separated in 2024.

== Notable victories ==
The following are some of the major races Opie has won in New Zealand and Australia.

Year	Race	Horse	Trainer(s)
1998	Auckland Cup	Jezabeel	Brian Jenkins
1998	Telegraph Handicap	Vegas	Graeme Rogerson & Keith Hawtin
1998	Thorndon Mile	Fayreform	Stephen Autridge
1998	New Zealand International Stakes	Fayreform	Stephen Autridge
1998	New Zealand Stakes	Fayreform	Stephen Autridge
1998	Ellerslie Sires Produce Stakes	Zola	Dave & Paul O'Sullivan
1998	VRC Oaks	Grand Archway	Graeme Rogerson
1998	New Zealand 2000 Guineas	Danske	Paul O'Sullivan
1999	Levin Classic	Buzz Lightyear	Robert Priscott
1999	New Zealand 2000 Guineas	Buzz Lightyear	Robert Priscott
2000	New Zealand Oaks	She's Country	Bruce Wallace
2000	Sir Byrne Hart Stakes	Cheiron	Bruce Marsh
2002	Levin Classic	Bunker	Trevor & Stephen McKee
2003	New Zealand Oaks	Bramble Road	Sir Mark Todd
2003	Kelt Capital Stakes	Distinctly Secret	Mark Walker
2003	New Zealand 2000 Guineas	King's Chapel	Mark Walker
2004	Railway Stakes	Vinaka	Paul O'Sullivan
2004	Zabeel Classic	Lashed	Graeme Rogerson & Stephen Autridge
2004	New Zealand Stakes	Lashed	Graeme Rogerson & Stephen Autridge
2004	New Zealand International Stakes	Lashed	Graeme Rogerson & Stephen Autridge
2004	Easter Handicap	Pomp And Glory	Alan Jones & Brett McDonald
2007	Telegraph Handicap	Darci Brahma	Mark Walker
2007	Thorndon Mile	Sir Slick	Graeme Nicholson
2007	Waikato Sprint	Darci Brahma	Mark Walker
2007	New Zealand Oaks	Princess Coup	Mark Walker
2007	Singapore Gold Cup	Recast	Laurie Laxon
2009	New Zealand 2000 Guineas	Katie Lee	Graeme & Debbie Rogerson
2009	New Zealand 1000 Guineas	Katie Lee	Graeme & Debbie Rogerson
2009	Captain Cook Stakes	Ekstreme	Bryce Reville
2010	New Zealand Stakes	Vosne Romanee	Jeff Lynds
2010	New Zealand Oaks	Keep The Peace	Shaune Ritchie
2010	Singapore Derby	Race Ahead	Bruce Marsh
2010	New Zealand 1000 Guineas	King's Rose	Jason Bridgman
2011	New Zealand Stakes	The Party Stand	Roger James
2011	Diamond Stakes	Anabandana	Don Selwood
2011	Manawatu Sires Produce Stakes	Anabandana	Don Selwood
2012	Diamond Stakes	Warhorse	Jason Bridgman
2013	New Zealand International Stakes	Sangster	Trent Busuttin & Natalie Young
2013	Diamond Stakes	Ruud Awakening	Stephen Marsh
2013	New Zealand 2000 Guineas	Atlante	Murray Baker
2014	New Zealand 2000 Guineas	Turn Me Loose	Murray Baker & Andrew Forsman
2015	Diamond Stakes	Dal Cielo	Murray Baker & Andrew Forsman
2015	Australian Derby	Mongolian Khan	Murray Baker & Andrew Forsman
2015	Caulfield Cup	Mongolian Khan	Murray Baker & Andrew Forsman
2016	Railway Stakes	Ryan Mark	John Morell
2015	New Zealand Derby	Mongolian Khan	Murray Baker & Andrew Forsman
2017	Karaka Million 2YO	Melody Belle	Stephen Autridge & Jamie Richards
2017	New Zealand Derby	Gingernuts	Stephen Autridge & Jamie Richards
2017	Rosehill Guineas	Gingernuts	Stephen Autridge & Jamie Richards
2017	Levin Classic	Hall Of Fame	Stephen Autridge & Jamie Richards
2017	Windsor Park Plate	Gingernuts	Stephen Autridge & Jamie Richards
2017	New Zealand 2000 Guineas	Embellish	Stephen Autridge & Jamie Richards
2018	Levin Classic	Age Of Fire	Stephen Autridge & Jamie Richards
2018	Karaka Million 2YO	Avantage	Stephen Autridge & Jamie Richards
2018	Sistema Stakes	Sword Of Osman	Stephen Autridge & Jamie Richards
2018	Captain Cook Stakes	Danzdanzdance	Chris Gibbs & Michelle Bradley
2018	Zabeel Classic	Danzdanzdance	Chris Gibbs & Michelle Bradley
2019	Sistema Stakes	Yourdeel	Jamie Richards
2019	Karaka Million 2YO	Probabeel	Jamie Richards
2019	New Zealand Stakes	Melody Belle	Jamie Richards
2019	Otaki-Maori Weight for Age	Melody Belle	Jamie Richards
2019	Manawatu Sires Produce Stakes	Yourdeel	Jamie Richards
2020	Telegraph Handicap	Avantage	Jamie Richards
2020	Karaka Million 2YO	Cool Aza Beel	Jamie Richards
2020	Karaka Million 2YO	Probabeel	Jamie Richards
2020	Waikato Sprint	Te Akau Shark	Jamie Richards
2020	Sistema Stakes	Cool Aza Beel	Jamie Richards
2020	New Zealand Stakes	Avantage	Jamie Richards
2020	Surround Stakes	Probabeel	Jamie Richards
2020	Chipping Norton Stakes	Te Akau Shark	Jamie Richards
2020	Australian Derby	Quick Thinker	Murray Baker & Andrew Forsman
2020	All Aged Stakes	Tofane	Mike Moroney
2020	New Zealand 1000 Guineas	Kahma Lass	Jamie Richards
2021	Railway Stakes	Avantage	Jamie Richards
2021	Thorndon Mile	Melody Belle	Jamie Richards
2021	Sistema Stakes	Sword of State	Jamie Richards
2021	New Zealand Oaks	Amarelinha	Jamie Richards
2021	Waikato Sprint	Avantage	Jamie Richards
2021	Otaki-Maori Weight for Age	Avantage	Jamie Richards
2021	New Zealand 2000 Guineas	Noverre	Jamie Richards
2021	New Zealand 1000 Guineas	The Perfect Pink	Jamie Richards
2022	Railway Stakes	Entriviere	Jamie Richards
2022	Karaka Million 2YO	Dynastic	Jamie Richards
2023	Railway Stakes	Imperatriz	Mark Walker
2023	Sistema Stakes	Tokyo Tycoon	Mark Walker
2023	William Reid Stakes	Imperatriz	Mark Walker
2023	A J Moir Stakes	Imperatriz	Mark Walker
2023	Manikato Stakes	Imperatriz	Mark Walker
2023	Darley Champions Sprint	Imperatriz	Mark Walker
2023	Zabeel Classic	Campionessa	Mark Walker & Sam Bergerson
2024	Levin Classic	Quintessa	Mark Walker & Sam Bergerson
2024	Black Caviar Lightning	Imperatriz	Mark Walker
2024	William Reid Stakes	Imperatriz	Mark Walker
2026	Manawatu Sires Produce Stakes	Seize The Day	Mark Walker & Sam Bergerson

== See also ==
- Lisa Allpress
- Noel Harris
- Chris Johnson
- Lance O'Sullivan
- Michael Walker
- David Walsh
- Thoroughbred racing in New Zealand
