= Otaki-Maori Weight for Age =

The Otaki-Maori Weight For Age Stakes is a group 1 flat horse race traditionally held at Otaki racecourse in New Zealand.

From 2025 the race has been held at Ellerslie Racecourse in Auckland.

== History ==
The race is held annually in February and is run under weight for age (WFA) conditions. It is now raced over a distance of 1600 metres, although in the past it was a 1400-metre event.

Originally the race was run as a Listed race and eventually stepped up to Group 1 status in 1992.

Past names for the race include the:

- Family Hotel WFA;
- Auto Auctions WFA;
- Terrace Regency Hotel WFA;
- First Sovereign Trust Otaki-Maori WFA;
- Huanui Farm WFA Classic;
- El Cheapo Cars WFA Classic;
- Trackside Otaki-Māori WFA Classic.

== Past results ==
Year	Stake	Winner	Sire	Dam	Jockey	Trainer(s)	Time	Second	Third
2026 (Ellerslie)	$600,000	Jaarffi 57	Iffraaj	Pride of Tralee (by Redoute's Choice)	Warren Kennedy	Lance Noble	1:35.58 (soft)	Pier 59	Provence 57
2025 (Ellerslie)	$500,000	El Vencedor 59	Shocking	Strictly Maternal	Wiremu Pinn	Stephen Marsh	1:35.91 (soft)	Qali Al Farrasha 57	Orchestral 57
2024	$400,000	La Crique 57	Vadamos	Destiny Cove	Matt Cameron	Simon & Katrina Alexander	1:35.01 (soft)	Aegon 59	Desert Lightning 59
2023	$300,000	Levante 57	Proisir (Aus)	Island Doy (GB)	Ryan Elliot	Ken & Bev Kelso	1:36.85 (soft)	La Crique 57	Chase 59
2022	$220,000	Mascarpone 59	Shooting To Win (Aus)	Fromage (Aus)	Wiremu Pinn	Team Rogerson	1:34.61 (dead)	Amarelinha 57	Brando 59
2021	$200,000	Avantage 57	Fastnet Rock	Asavant (by Zabeel)	Opie Bosson	Jamie Richards	1:34.07 (dead)	Callsign Mav 59	Travelling Light 57
2020	$200,000	Avantage 57	Fastnet Rock	Asavant (by Zabeel)	Danielle Johnson	Jamie Richards	1:35.02 (dead)	Prise De Fer 59	The Chosen One 59
2019	$200,000	Melody Belle 57	Commands	Meleka Belle	Opie Bosson	Jamie Richards	1:36.27 (heavy)	Wyndspelle 59	Consensus 57
2018 (Hastings)	$200,000	Devise 57	Darci Brahma	Doneze Girl	Michael Coleman	Shaune Ritchie	1:34.30 (good)	Consensus 57	Travimyfriend 59
2017	$200,000	Kawi 59	Savabeel	Magic Time	Jason Waddell	Allan Sharrock	1:34.60 (good)	Start Wondering 59	Sofia Rosa 57
2016	$200,000	Volkstok'n'barrell 59	Tavistock	Volkster	Vincent Colgan	Donna Logan & Chris Gibbs	1:36.12 (good)	Julinsky Prince 59	Scapolo 59
2015	$200,000	Iamishwara 59	Keeninsky	She's Heroic	Robert Hannam	Antony Kaye	1:35.68 (good)	Natuzzi 59	Julinsky Prince 59
2014	$200,000	Nashville 59	Darci Brahma	Royal Kiss	Jonathan Riddell	Adrian & Harry Bull	1:35.68 (good)	Xanadu 57	Final Touch 57
2013	$200,000	Nashville 59	Darci Brahma	Royal Kiss	Kelly McCulloch	Adrian Bull	1:34.07 (good)	Veyron 59	Better Than Ever 59
2012	$200,000	Veyron 59	Thorn Park	Over The Limit	Mark Hills	Linda Laing	1:34.03 (dead)	Lady Kipling 57	Guiseppina 57
2011	$200,000	Keep the Peace 57	Keeper	Peace Of Mind	James McDonald	Shaune Ritchie	1:33.51 (good)	Wall Street 59	Dasoudi 57
2010	$200,000	Mufhasa 59	Pentire	Sheila Cheval	Samantha Spratt	Stephen McKee	1:32.89 (good)	Hold It Harvey 59	Daffodil 57
2009	$200,000	Culminate 57	Elnadim	Solstice (by Marceau)	Samantha Spratt	Stephen McKee	1:37.46 (slow)	Eel Win 59	Atapi 59
2008	$200,000	Alamosa 55	O'Reilly	Lodore Mystic	Michael Walker	Peter McKay	1:32.69 (good)	Sir Slick 59	Fiscal Madness 59
2007	$150,000	Sir Slick 59	Volksraad	Miss Opera (Paris Opera)	Bruce Herd	Graeme Nicholson	1:34.97 (good)	Jokers Wild 55	Shinzig 59
2006	$100,000	Darci Brahma	Danehill	Grand Echezeaux	Michael Walker	Mark Walker	1:33.67	Kristov	Penitentiary
2005	$100,000	Zvezda	His Royal Highness	Carnival Girl	Bruce Herd	Kay Lane	1:24.47	Shastri	Travellin’ Man
2004 (Hastings)	$100,000	King's Chapel	King Of Kings	Lower Chapel (by Sharpo)	Rhys McLeod	Mark Walker	1:20.32	Vinaka	Sedecrem
2003	$120,000	Critic	Centaine	Benazir (by Vice Regal)	Lance O'Sullivan		1:21.86	Hustler	Tit For Taat
2002	$100,000	No Mean City	Star Board	Jigtime	Damian Browne		1:21.82	Star Satire	Fritz
2001	$100,000	Star Satire	Volksraad	Satirical (by Kaapstad)	Mark Du Plessis		1:21.44	Cinder Bella	Golden Butterfly
2000	$90,000	Surface 57.5	Crested Wave	Kosha	Noel Harris	Noel Eales	1:20.33	Furnish 57.5	Centre Crest 57.5
1999	$80,000	Hero	Deputy Governor	Domino (by Grosvenor)	Brian Hibberd		1:20.47	Integrate	Rebel
1998	$80,000	Centre Crest	Lord Century	Crest Of Casitas (by Crested Wave)	Catherine Huchinson		1:20.19	Jazzac	Ferragamo
1997	$80,000	It's My Sin	Success Express	Rosalina	Toby Brett	Michael Moroney	1:21.22	Panagold	Batavian
1996	$80,000	Diablo Girl	Bletchencore	Bandonair	Bruce Compton		1:20.72	Corndale	Snap
1995	$80,000	Allegro	Red Tempo	Gallant Heights	Gary Grylls	Chris & Colleen Wood	1:25.72	Ensign Ewart	Avedon
1994	$80,000	Lord Tridan 57.5	Lord Ballina	Salaprime	David Walsh	Michael Moroney & Graham Richardson	1:21.27	Javelin	Panagold
1993	$80,000	Javelin 57.5	Famous Star	Kay Ward	Lance O'Sullivan		1:22.22	Calm Harbour	Status
1992	$100,000	Javelin 57	Famous Star	Kay Ward	Lance O'Sullivan		1:21.55	Vain Sovereign	Prince Of Praise
1991	$100,000	Rough Habit 57	Roughcast	Certain Habit	Ross N Elliott	John Wheeler	1:27.09	Mr Tiz 57	Sandboy 58
1990	$120,000	Westminster 57.5	Grosvenor	Apple Blossom	Grant Cooksley	N M Fraser	1:20.70	Fun On The Run 58	Cotton Club 56
1989	$112,000	Poetic Prince 57	Yeats	Finisterre	Noel Harris		1:22.70	Straight Order 57	Krona 54
1988 April	$100,000	Poetic Prince 54.5	Yeats	Finisterre	Noel Harris		1:20.30	Westminster 54.5	Courier Bay 57.5
1987	$75,500	Society Bay 53.5	Zephyr Bay	Pacaya	David Walsh		1:22.80	Dare 56.5	Lady Aloof 56.5
1986	$50,600	Peat 56.5	Beaufort Sea	Wayward Lass	Grant Davison		1:21.30	Shifnal Prince 57.5	Tanalyse 57.5

== See also ==
- Recent winners of major NZ races
- Levin Classic
- Aotearoa Classic
- Railway Stakes
- Telegraph Handicap
- Thorndon Mile
- Waikato Sprint
- Captain Cook Stakes
