= Volksraad (horse) =

British-bred Thoroughbred racehorse

- Sire: Green Desert (USA)
- Grandsire: Danzig (USA)
- Dam: Celtic Assembly
- Damsire: Secretariat
- Sex: Stallion
- Foaled: 1988
- Country: United Kingdom
- Colour: Bay
- Breeder: Windsor Park Stud
- Owner: Windsor Park Stud
- Record: 3 starts, 2 wins, 1 third
- Earnings: £20,291

Awards
- Champion New Zealand sire (2001–2007)
- Last updated on April 2009

Volksraad (5 February 1988 – 28 December 2011) was a British-bred thoroughbred horse who when standing at stud in New Zealand was a champion sire. He dominated the New Zealand sires lists, with six consecutive titles from 2001 to 2007.

== Racing career ==
Volksraad was bred by the Darley Stud and his name is allied with an old Afrikaans parliamentary assembly. He was trained by Henry Cecil and won as a two-year-old at Newmarket. He had two starts as a three-year-old, winning at Royal Ascot and then finished third in the Group Two Newmarket Challenge Stakes. A training accident led to his premature retirement.

== Stud career ==
He was purchased for 21,000 guineas at auction from the 1992 December sales in England by Nelson Schick and Steve Till, Pat Connell and the Davison family and moved to New Zealand. He began his stud career at Mapperley Stud, near Matamata, standing for a $2500 service fee, before transferring to Windsor Park Stud. His service fee peaked at $27,500.

Volksraad was euthanased after fracturing a shoulder in a paddock accident on 28 December 2011. He was 23 years old.

=== Notable progeny ===
His progeny includes:

- Bahnhof Zoo, winner of 8 races in New Zealand
- Clifton King, winner of the South African Guineas (G1) and Gosforth Park Centenary November Handicap (G1)
- Clifton Prince, winner of 11 races in New Zealand including the Wellesley Stakes and the 2005 & 2006 Stewards Stakes Handicap (G3 1200m Riccarton)
- Dantelah, winner of the 1999 Oakleigh Plate
- Dezigna, winner of 11 races in New Zealand including the 2007 Rich Hill Mile (G2 1600m, Ellerslie) and 2008 Captain Cook Stakes
- Distill, winner of the 2011 Levin Classic
- Fiscal Madness, winner of 12 races, including the Group 2 2008 Rich Hill Mile
- Katana, winner of Group 2 BNZ Breeders Stakes and 2nd in 2003 Manawatu Sires Produce Stakes
- Military Move, the 2010 New Zealand Derby winner
- One Under, winner of the 1999 Manawatu Sires Produce Stakes and Ellerslie Sires Produce Stakes
- Orange County, winner of the Group 1 2008 Sir Rupert Clarke Stakes
- Sir Slick, six-time Group 1 winner
- Star Satire, winner of the 2001 Otaki-Maori Weight for Age and runner up in the Phar Lap Stakes
- Thriller, winner of the 1997 Group 3 Eclipse Stakes
- Torlesse, winner of the 2003 New Zealand Cup
- Tusker, winner of the 2005 Championship Stakes and 2006 Awapuni Gold Cup
- Veloce Bella, winner of 12 races including the 2006 Avondale Guineas (G2) & Eight Carat Classic (G2), 2007 Sir Tristram Fillies Classic (G2), 2009 Travis Stakes (G2), 2010 New Zealand International Stakes (G1) and 2011 Trentham Stakes (G3)
- Velocitea, winner of the 2009 How Now Stakes, 2010 Hyderabad Race Club Stakes and The Goodwood
- Vinaka, winner of the 2001 Hawke's Bay Guineas and 2002 Telegraph Handicap (G1 1200m) as a 3-year old. Also first past the post before being relegated in the 2001 Manawatu Sires Produce Stakes.
- Volkaire, winner of 9 races including the 2001 Churchill Stakes (G3, Riccarton)
- Willy Smith, winner of the 2007 Wellington Cup
- Zola, winner of the 1998 Ellerslie Sires Produce Stakes

==== Dam sire ====
He is the dam sire of:

- Beauty Flash, winner of the 2010 Hong Kong Mile and 2011 Queen's Silver Jubilee Cup
- Devise, winner of the 2018 Otaki-Maori Weight for Age
- Kawi, winner of the 2015 Makfi Challenge Stakes and Zabeel Classic, 2016 Thorndon Mile, Makfi Challenge Stakes and Windsor Park Plate and the 2017 Captain Cook Stakes
- Lights Of Heaven winner of the 2011 Schweppes Oaks and 2012 Brisbane Cup
- Santa Monica, winner of the 2019 Railway Stakes

== See also ==
Thoroughbred racing in New Zealand
