= I Am Invincible (horse) =

Australian thoroughbred racehorse

- Sire: Invincible Spirit
- Grandsire: Green Desert
- Dam: Cannarelle
- Damsire: Canny Lad
- Sex: Stallion
- Foaled: 21 September 2004 (age 20)
- Country: Australia
- Colour: Bay
- Breeder: International Thoroughbreds Bloodstock Investments
- Owner: R J Gall & B D Gall
- Trainer: Toby Edmonds (2007); Michael, Wayne & John Hawkes (2008); Peter Morgan (2009)
- Record: 13: 5-1-1
- Earnings: A$270,050

Major wins
- D.C. McKay Stakes (2009); Sir John Monash Stakes (2009)

Awards
- Australian Champion Sire (2021/22),(2022/23),(2023/24)

I Am Invincible (foaled 21 September 2004) is a stakes winning Australian bred thoroughbred racehorse that is most notable for his success as a stallion, having sired more than 60 individual stakes winners.

== Background ==
I Am Invincible was purchased at the 2006 Inglis NSW Classic Twilight Session by his original trainer Toby Edmonds for owners Ray and Brett Gall for A$62,500.

== Racing career ==
I Am Invincible won his debut race by five lengths on 21 February 2007 at Warwick Farm. The performance convinced trainer Toby Edmonds to set the horse towards the Golden Slipper. He next lined up in the Kindergarten Stakes. Drawn near the outside in a field of 14, the horse again showed brilliant speed to cross and sit in second place before finishing a game third to the eventual Golden Slipper winner Forensics.

Injured at his next start when down the track in the Todman Stakes, the horse was forced off the scene for a prolonged period. He recaptured his best form as a four year-old for Victorian trainer Peter Morgan with brilliant wins in the D.C. McKay Stakes at Morphettville and the Sir John Monash Stakes at Caulfield.

In 2009 he ran a memorable second to Takeover Target in The Goodwood. Jockey Darren Gauci took him to the lead and kicked clear rounding the turn, however he was overtaken late to be beaten a length.

== Stud career ==
I Am Invincible was retired from racing to stand at Yarraman Park Stud in Scone, New South Wales. His initial service fee was $11,000. This increased to $247,500 in 2019, making him the most expensive stallion in Australia. He has recently serviced two of Australia's greatest horses, Winx and Black Caviar. His fee was reduced to AU$209,000 (US$134,252) for 2020, though even at that fee he remained the country's most expensive stallion.

=== Notable progeny ===
I Am Invincible has currently sired 20 individual Group 1 winners:

c = colt, f = filly, g = gelding

Foaled	Name	Sex	Major wins
2011	Brazen Beau	c	Coolmore Stud Stakes, Newmarket Handicap
2011	Voodoo Lad	g	Winterbottom Stakes
2012	Hellbent	c	William Reid Stakes
2012	Viddora	f	Winterbottom Stakes, A J Moir Stakes
2013	I Am A Star	f	Myer Classic
2013	Invincibella	f	Tattersall's Tiara
2015	Media Sensation	f	New Zealand 1000 Guineas
2015	Oohood	f	Flight Stakes
2016	Lombardo	g	The Goodwood
2016	Loving Gaby	f	Manikato Stakes, William Reid Stakes
2016	Marabi	f	Oakleigh Plate
2018	Home Affairs	c	Coolmore Stud Stakes, Black Caviar Lightning
2018	Imperatriz	f	Levin Classic, New Zealand Thoroughbred Breeders Stakes, Railway Stakes, BCD Group Sprint, William Reid Stakes, A J Moir Stakes, Manikato Stakes, Champions Sprint, Lightning Stakes
2019	In Secret	f	Coolmore Stud Stakes, Newmarket Handicap
2020	Caballus	g	Newmarket Handicap
2020	Charm Stone	f	Robert Sangster Stakes, Manikato Stakes
2021	Move To Strike	c	Manawatu Sires Produce Stakes
2022	My Gladiola	f	A J Moir Stakes
2022	Vinrock	c	Sires' Produce Stakes
2023	Seize The Day	c	Manawatu Sires Produce Stakes

== Pedigree ==
Pedigree of I Am Invincible (AUS) 2004
Sire Invincible Spirit (IRE) 1997	Green Desert (USA); 1983	Danzig	Northern Dancer
Sire Invincible Spirit (IRE) 1997	Green Desert (USA); 1983	Danzig	Pas de Nom
Sire Invincible Spirit (IRE) 1997	Green Desert (USA); 1983	Foreign Courier	Sir Ivor
Sire Invincible Spirit (IRE) 1997	Green Desert (USA); 1983	Foreign Courier	Courtly Dee
Sire Invincible Spirit (IRE) 1997	Rafha (GB); 1987	Kris	Sharpen Up
Sire Invincible Spirit (IRE) 1997	Rafha (GB); 1987	Kris	Doubly Sure
Sire Invincible Spirit (IRE) 1997	Rafha (GB); 1987	Eljazzi	Artaius
Sire Invincible Spirit (IRE) 1997	Rafha (GB); 1987	Eljazzi	Border Bounty
Dam Cannarelle (AUS) 1998	Canny Lad (AUS); 1987	Bletchingly	Biscay
Dam Cannarelle (AUS) 1998	Canny Lad (AUS); 1987	Bletchingly	Coogee
Dam Cannarelle (AUS) 1998	Canny Lad (AUS); 1987	Jesmond Lass	Lunchtime
Dam Cannarelle (AUS) 1998	Canny Lad (AUS); 1987	Jesmond Lass	Beautiful Dreamer
Dam Cannarelle (AUS) 1998	Countess Pedrille (AUS); 1994	Zoffany	Our Native
Dam Cannarelle (AUS) 1998	Countess Pedrille (AUS); 1994	Zoffany	Grey Dawn Girl
Dam Cannarelle (AUS) 1998	Countess Pedrille (AUS); 1994	Sister Pedrille	Cardinal
Dam Cannarelle (AUS) 1998	Countess Pedrille (AUS); 1994	Sister Pedrille	Royal Law
