= Waikato Sprint =

Waikato Sprint, raced as BCD Group Sprint
- Class: Group I
- Location: Te Rapa Racecourse; Hamilton, New Zealand
- Inaugurated: 1974
- Race type: Thoroughbred - Flat racing

Race information
- Distance: 1400m (7 furlongs)
- Surface: Turf
- Track: Left-handed
- Qualification: Three-year-olds and up
- Weight: Weight for Age

The Waikato Sprint currently run as the BCD Group Sprint is a Group 1 Thoroughbred horse race run at Te Rapa Racecourse in Hamilton in early February.

It is currently held on the same day as the Group 1 Herbie Dykes Stakes.

The list of winners includes many of the top-class sprinter-milers to have raced in New Zealand. The champion mare Sunline won back-to-back victories in 2001 and 2002. The well-performed gelding Mufhasa won the 2009 and 2011 events (also winning the Telegraph Handicap in both of these years) and was also 2nd in 2012 and 3rd in 2010. Courier Bay won in both 1987 and 1988 but was unable to get a third win, running second by 1 1/4 lengths to the reigning Cox Plate winner, Poetic Prince, the following year.

== Race results ==
Year	Stake	Winner	Jockey	Trainer(s)	Time	2nd	3rd
2026	$500,000	First Five 59	Wiremu Pinn	David Greene	1:21.21 (soft)	Sterling Express 59	Tomodachi 57
2025	$500,000	Here To Shock 59	Nash Rawiller	Ben, Will & JD Hayes	1:21.84 (good)	Bosustow 55.5	Savaglee 55.5
2024	$400,000	Bonny Lass 57	Craig Grylls	Graham Richardson & Rogan Norvall	1:21.82 (good)	Crocetti 55.5	Callsign Mav 59
2023	$300,000	Imperatriz 57	Opie Bosson	Mark Walker, Matamata	1:20.70 (good)	Babylon Berlin 57	Levante 57
2022	$220,000	Levante 57	Ryan Elliot	Ken & Bev Kelso, Matamata	1:23.56 (soft)	Entriviere 57	Mascarpone 59
2021	$200,000	Avantage 57.5	Opie Bosson	Jamie Richards, Matamata	1:20.87 (good)	Callsign Mav 59	Mascarpone 59
2020	$200,000	Te Akau Shark 59	Opie Bosson	Jamie Richards, Matamata	1:21.7 (good)	The Mitigator 59	Kiwi Ida 57
2019	$200,000	Melody Belle 57	Troy Harris	Jamie Richards, Matamata	1:22.62 (good)	Bostonian 59	Ardrossan 59
2018	$200,000	Start Wondering 59	Johnathan Parkes	J J & Evan Rayner, Whanganui	1:25.80 (heavy)	Packing Eagle 59	Brilliant Shine 59
2017	$200,000	Start Wondering 59	Johnathan Parkes	J J & Evan Rayner, Whanganui	1:21.22 (good)	Natuzzi 59	Saracino 55.5
2016	$200,000	Xtravagant 55.5	Matt Cameron	Stephen Autridge & Jamie Richards, Matamata	1:21.92 (good)	Vespa 59	Recite 57
2015	$200,000	Sacred Star 59	Vincent Colgan	Tony Pike, Cambridge	1:20.81 (good)	Natuzzi 59	Spin Doctor 59
2014	$200,000	Viadana 57	Craig Grylls	Lance Noble, Matamata	1:22.19 (soft)	Sacred Star 59	Diademe 57
2013	$200,000	Final Touch 57	Chris Johnson	John & Karen Parsons, Balcairn	1:21.38 (good)	Xanadu 57	Zurella 57
2012	$200,000	Veyron 59	Leith Innes	Linda Laing, Cambridge	1:20.99 (good)	Mufhasa 59	Fazzle 57
2011	$200,000	Mufhasa 59	Samantha Spratt	Stephen McKee, Ardmore	1:21.09 (good)	Wall Street 59	Keep The Peace 57
2010	$200,000	Tavistock 59	Jason Waddell	Andrew Campbell, Opaki	1:21.30 (good)	Wealth Princess 57	Mufhasa 59
2009	$200,000	Mufhasa 59	Samantha Spratt	Stephen McKee, Ardmore	1:22.54 (good)	Gaze 57	Ruud Van Slaats 57
2008	$200,000	Seachange 56.5	Gavin McKeon	Graeme Sanders, Te Awamutu	1:21.31 (good)	Kay's Awake 56.5	Run Like Al 55.5
2007	$150,000	Darci Brahma 59	Opie Bosson	Mark Walker, Matamata	1:22.35 (good)	Shinzig 59	Kay's Awake 56.5
2006	$150,000	Kristov 57.5	Jason Waddell	Phillip Stevens	1:23.63 (soft)	Darci Brahma 53	Gee I Jane 56
2005	$100,000	Sedecrem	Andrew Calder	Colin Jillings & Richard Yuill, Takanini	1:22.17		
2004	$100,000	Sedecrem	Grant Cooksley	Colin Jillings & Richard Yuill, Takanini	1:22.53		
2003	$100,000	Tit For Taat	Michael Walker	Wayne Herbert	1:22.66		
2002	$100,000	Sunline	Greg Childs	Trevor & Stephen McKee, Takanini	1:21.67		
2001	$100,000	Sunline	Greg Childs	Trevor & Stephen McKee, Takanini	1:22.24		
2000	$100,000	Tall Poppy 56	Jim Walker	Noel Eales, Awapuni	1:21.29		
1999	$100,000	Surface	Noel Harris	Noel Eales, Awapuni	1:21.4		
1998	$100,000	Rebel	Catherine Huchinson	Ron Langsford	1:21.05		
1997	$100,000	Avedon	Chris Johnson	Patrick Campbell, Awapuni	1:22.47		
1996	$100,000	Allegro	Gary Grylls	Chris & Colleen Wood, Cambridge	1:22.32		
1995	$100,000	Snap	Lance O'Sullivan	Dave & Paul O'Sullivan, Matamata	1:26.14		
1994	$100,000	Western Red 53	Brian Hibberd	Paul Jelicich, Avondale	1:21.71		
1993	$100,000	Veandercross 57.5	Jim Walker	Chris Turner & John Wheeler, New Plymouth	1:22.08		
1992	$100,000	Mrs Selleck 56	Roy McKay	Patrick Busuttin, Foxton	1:20.60		
1991	$98,000	Mr Tiz 57.5	Lance O'Sullivan	Dave & Paul O'Sullivan, Matamata	1:21.17		
1990	Not Held						
1989	$117,600	Poetic Prince 57	Noel Harris	John Wheeler, New Plymouth	1:21.40		
1988	$117,600	Courier Bay 57.5	David Walsh	G A White	1:23.27		
1987	$98,000	Courier Bay 57	David Walsh	G A White	1:20.73		
1986	$63,000	Tanalyse 57.5	David Walsh	Don Grubb, Fielding	1:21.06		
1985	$48,000	Super Tai 57.5	David Peake	Frederick Hill, Stratford	1:21.09		
1984	$37,300	Abit Leica 53	Peter Fearon	Warren Dymond, Stratford	1:21.53		
1983	$29,140	Pinson 53	Diane Moseley	Don Couchman, Hawera	1:23.42		
1982	$31,200	Givenchy 57	David Peake	Ray Verner, Takanini	1:25.3		
1981	$31,000	Mun Lee 56	Greg Childs	Malcolm Smith, Awapuni	1:22.7		
1980	$31,000	Coobers Queen	Gary Phillips	Peter Melville, Kaponga	1:26.87		
1979	$31,000	March Legend 57.5	Roger Lang	Donald Nash, Takanini	1:26.0		
1978	$27,300	Copper Belt 57.5	Jim Walker	Brian Deacon, Hawera	1:22.4		
1977	$20,250	Soliloquy 56	David Medcalfe	Ray Verner, Takanini	1:23.1		
1976	$16,000	Mop	Pat Trotter	Keith Couper, Hastings	1:22.1		
1975	$16,000	Auditor 57.5	Graeme Hare	Wally McEwan & L Gestro, Hawera	1:22.6		
1974	$15,000	Kings Romance 57.5	Gary Willetts	Malcolm Smith, New Plymouth	1:23.7		

== See also ==
- Recent winners of major NZ sprint races
- Telegraph Handicap
- Railway Stakes
- Otaki-Maori Weight for Age
- Captain Cook Stakes
