= Imperatriz (horse) =

Australian-bred Thoroughbred racehorse

- Sire: I Am Invincible (Aus)
- Grandsire: Invincible Spirit (Ire)
- Dam: Berimbau
- Damsire: Sharmadal
- Sex: Mare
- Foaled: 16 August 2018
- Country: Australia
- Colour: Bay
- Breeder: Raffles Dancers (N Z) Pty Ltd
- Owner: Te Akau Invincible Empress Racing Partnership, (Mgr: Karyn Fenton-Ellis MNZM)
- Trainer: (1) Jamie Richards, Matamata (2) Mark Walker & Sam Bergerson, Matamata (2) Mark Walker, Cranbourne
- Record: 24: 18–2–1
- Earnings: AU$5,950,167

Major wins
- Levin Classic (2022); New Zealand Thoroughbred Breeders Stakes (2022); Railway Stakes (2023); BCD Group Sprint (2023); William Reid Stakes (2023, 2024); Moir Stakes (2023); Manikato Stakes (2023); Champions Sprint (2023); Lightning Stakes (2024)

Awards
- Australian Champion Sprinter (2023/24); New Zealand Horse of the Year (2023/24); New Zealand Racing Hall of Fame (2025)

Imperatriz (foaled 16 August 2018) is an Australian-bred and New Zealand raced Thoroughbred racehorse, notable for winning nine Group 1 races in New Zealand and Australia. Imperatriz was bred by Raffles Dancers (N Z) Pty Ltd.

== Racing career ==
Imperatriz was raced by the Te Akau Invincible Empress Racing Partnership, managed by Karen Fenton-Ellis.

Her initial race training was at Matamata and she had her first race on 26 November 2020 at Otaki, ridden by Danielle Johnson, which she won by a short neck. She continued her career in New Zealand, initially ridden by Danielle Johnson until the end of 2021, then Michael McNab and Opie Bosson. She moved to Te Akau's Australia stables in 2023.

In the 2023 McEwen Stakes, Imperatriz ridden by Michael Dee carrying 56.5 kg, broke the 1000m track record at The Valley when winning in 56.56 seconds. A fortnight later with Opie Bosson aboard she bettered her own track record with a 56.47 second victory in the A J Moir Stakes.

Imperatriz won the Moonee Valley Group 1 Sprint Triple Crown in 2023. In 2024, she was also named New Zealand Champion Sprinter/Miler and New Zealand Horse of the year.

== Racing career ==
The following are the races competed in by Imperatriz:

2020

- 1st Usabus & Coaches (2YO SW+P 1100m, Otaki) beating Mochatini and Silky Red Fox

2021

- 1st Eclipse Stakes (Group 2 1100m, Ellerslie) beating Stormy and Sword Of State
- 1st Northland Breeders Stakes (G3 1200m, Te Rapa) beating I Wish I Win and Farrenc
- 3rd Gold Trail Stakes (G3 1200m, Hastings) behind Bellacontte and Mustang Valley
- 1st Soliloquy Stakes (G3 1400, Matamata) beating Dubhai Diva and Belle En Rouge
- 4th New Zealand 1000 Guineas (G1 1600m, Riccarton) behind The Perfect Pink, Shepherd's Delight and Belle En Rouge

2022

- 2nd Almanzor Trophy (G3 1200m, Ellerslie) behind Sword Of State, with Wewillrock third
- 1st Lisa Chittick Plate (1400m, Matamata) beating Les Crayeres and Dragon Queen
- 1st Levin Classic (G1 1600m, Trentham) beating On The Bubbles and I Wish I Win
- 1st New Zealand Thoroughbred Breeders Stakes (G1 1600m, Te Rapa) beating Coventina Bay and Two Illicit
- 1st Kerikeri Cup (Open Hcp 1100m, Ruakaka) beating Dragon Leap and Winning For All
- 1st Foxbridge Plate (G2 1200m, Te Rapa) beating Butler and Demonetization
- 4th Tarzino Trophy (G1 1400m, Hastings) behind Dark Destroyer and Spring Tide
- 8th Arrowfield Stud Plate (G1 1600m, Matamata) won by La Crique from Mustang Valley
- 1st Railway Stakes (G1 1200m, Te Rapa) beating Babylon Berlin and Levante

2023

- 1st Westbury Classic (G2 1400m, Counties) beating Our Alley Cat and Dragon Queen
- 1st BCD Sprint (G1 1400m Te Rapa) beating Babylon Berlin and Levante
- 2nd Canterbury Stakes (G1 1300m, Randwick) behind Artorius with Electric Girl third
- 1st William Reid Stakes (G1 WFA 1200m, The Valley) beating Bella Nipotina
- 1st McEwen Stakes (G2 1000m, The Valley) beating Rothfire and Giga Kick
- 1st A J Moir Stakes (G1 1000m, The Valley) beating Asfoora and Uncommon James
- 1st Manikato Stakes (G1 1200m, The Valley) beating I Am Me and Uncommon James
- 1st Champions Sprint (G1 1200m, Flemington) beating Buenos Noches and In Secret

2024

- 1st Black Caviar Lightning (G1 1000m, Flemington) beating Private Eye and Espionia
- 2nd Newmarket Handicap (G1 1200m, Flemington) behind Cylinder with The Astrologist 3rd. In this race Imperatriz carried 58 kg, while Cylinder was on 51.5 and The Astrologist on 52.5.
- 1st William Reid Stakes (G1 WFA 1200m, The Valley) beating Johnny Rocker and I Am Me.

In 2025 Imperatriz was inducted into the New Zealand Racing Hall of Fame.
