= Railway Stakes (New Zealand) =

Annual horse race in Auckland, New Zealand

- Class: Group I
- Location: Ellerslie Racecourse; Auckland, New Zealand
- Inaugurated: 1890; 136 years ago
- Race type: Thoroughbred - Flat racing
- Website: www.ellerslie.co.nz

Race information
- Distance: 1200m (6 furlongs)
- Surface: Turf
- Track: Right-handed
- Qualification: Three-year-olds and up
- Weight: Set Weights & Penalties
- Purse: NZ$700,000 (2026)

The Railway Stakes is a Group One New Zealand horse race. Held at Ellerslie it is raced over 1200 metres, and is one of New Zealand's feature sprint races.

Among its most notable winners are:

- Avantage, the winner of the 2021 Railway, the 2020 and 2021 Telegraph Handicap, 2020 Otaki-Maori Weight for Age, Foxbridge Plate and Bonecrusher New Zealand Stakes.
- Bawakalasana the winner of both the Railway and the Telegraph Handicap in 1999.
- Diamond Lover in 1987 who broke the Ellerslie track record, running 1:07.73.
- Imperatriz in 2023, who went on to win multiple group 1 races in Australia.
- Loader, the winner of the Railway and Telegraph Handicap in 1996.
- Mayo Gold in 1970, the first winner to finish under 1:10.
- the great Mr Tiz, who won this race three times (1989–1991), the 1991 Waikato Sprint and the 1989 and 1990 Telegraph Handicap.
- Rizzio, the 1948 and 1949 winner.
- Tudor Light, in 1977.
- Yahabeebe, the 1957 and 1958 winner.

Some of the biggest upsets in the history of the race were in 2009 when Jacowils triumphed at odds of 104-1, and in 2011 when Miss Raggedy Ann won the race as the 86-1 outsider.

In 2014, the exceptional filly Bounding became the first 3-year-old to win the Railway in 33 years.

In 2025 the Railway Stakes was moved from on New Year's Day to the Karaka Million meeting in late January.

== Winners Since 1970 ==
The following are brief details of the previous winners of the Railway Stakes.

Year	Winner	Jockey	Trainer(s)	Time	Second	Third
2026	Jigsaw 57	Logan Bates (a)	Cindy Alderson, Cranbourne, Victoria	1:09.55 (soft)	Arkansaw Kid 58	Sweynesday 55
2025	Crocetti 56.5	Warren Kennedy	Danny Walker & Arron Tata	1:10.22 (soft)	Alabama Lass 52	Luberon 55
2024	Waitak 55	Warren Kennedy	Lance O'Sullivan & Andrew Scott	1:09.76 (Pukekohe)	Bonny Lass 54	Mercurial 55
2023	Imperatriz 56	Opie Bosson	Mark Walker	1:08.90 (Te Rapa)	Babylon Berlin 54	Levante 57
2022	Entriviere 55	Opie Bosson	Jamie Richards, Matamata	1:09.36	Levante 55	Babylon Berlin 53.5
2021	Avantage 57	Opie Bosson	Jamie Richards, Matamata	1:08.91	Julius 58	Levante 53.5
2020	Julius 56	Jason Waddell	John Bell, Cambridge	1:09.70	Winter Bride	Evalina
2019	Santa Monica 53	Trudy Thornton	Stephen Ralph, Te Awamutu	1:09.47	Princess Kereru	Melody Belle
2018	Volpe Veloce 54	Jake Bayliss	Graham Richardson, Matamata	1:10.65	Packing Eagle	Volks Lightning
2017	Start Wondering 55.5	Johnathan Parkes	J J & Evan Rayner, Whanganui	1:08.84	Perfect Fit	Reilly Lincoln
2016	Ryan Mark 56	Opie Bosson	John Morell, Te Rapa	1:11.04	Allez Eagle	Natuzzi
2015	In Style 54	Leith Innes	Danica Guy, Matamata	1:10.34	Whosyourmaster	Durham Town
2014	Bounding 52	Mark Du Plessis	Ken & Bev Kelso, Matamata	1:10.25	Waterford	Little Wonder
2013	Fleur de Lune 54	Jason Jago	Lee Somerville, Cambridge	1:09.21	Jetset Lad	Durham Town
2012	Atomic Force 58	Nash Rawiller	Gai Waterhouse, Randwick (AUS)	1:11.57	The Hombre	Twilight Savings
2011	Miss Raggedy Ann 53	Natasha Collett	Andrew Scott, Matamata	1:09.87	Atapi	Tip The Wink
2010	A Gold Trail 57	Michael Rodd	Gary Portelli, Warwick Farm Racecourse (AUS)	1:09.34	Atapi	Richard Beymer
2009	Jacowils 55.5	Mark Hills	Kristin Stead, Te Rapa	1:09.60	Dashing Donna	Pinsoir
2008	Imananabaa 54	Andrew Calder	Don Sellwood, Cambridge	1:09.04	Needuask	Brianna
2007	Donna Rosita 51	Lisa Cropp	Piri Ranui, Tauranga	1:09.74	Gee I Jane	Imananabaa
2006	Baldessarini 53.5	Lisa Cropp	Anne Herbert	1:08.85	Gee I Jane 55	Pin Up Boy 52.5
2005	Recurring 56	Hayden Tinsley	Gerald Ryan, Rosehill (AUS)	1:10.12	Gee I Jane 51.5	Sedecrem 56
2004	Vinaka	Opie Bosson	Paul O'Sullivan, Matamata	1:08.66	Pay My Bail	Tully Dane
2003	Egyptian Raine 52	Lance O'Sullivan	Kenny Rae, Ruakaka	1:08.66	Gwen's Rules 52	Marcurous 52
2002	Sound The Alarm	Gary Grylls	Richard Otto, Te Aroha	1:09.97	Super Impressive	Vinaka
2001	Fritz 58	Noel Harris	Neil Coulbeck, Leithfield	1:10.45	O’Malleys Boy 58	Travellin’ Man 56
2000	Cannsea 53.5	Michael Coleman	Michael Moroney & Andrew Scott, Matamata	1:09.63	Cullen 51.5	Star Of Gold 53.5
1999	Bawalaksana 50.5	Chris Munce	Paul O'Sullivan, Matamata	1:09.69	Dantelah 50	Vain Ana 54
1998	Coogee Walk 51	Shane Dye	Dave & Paul O'Sullivan, Matamata	1:08.55	Rebel 51	Paint 50
1997	Kailey 50.5	Lisa Cropp	Graham Richardson, Matamata	1:08.50	Krispin Klear 55.5	Coberger 55
1996	Loader 52.5	Chris Johnson	Peter & Dawn Williams	1:08.83	Red Cent 52	So Keen 51
1995	Coberger 48.5	Matthew Williamson	Chris & Jim Gibbs, Matamata	1:09.74	Lord Tridan 57	Ensign Ewart 51.5
1994	Ensign Ewart 50.5	Lance O'Sullivan	Dave & Paul O’Sullivan, Matamata	1:08.70	Lord Tridan 53.5	Delanira 49
1993	Hypervain 54	David Peake	Charlie Faulkner, Takanini	1:08.42	Lord Tridan 54	Hulastrike 51
1992	Vain Sovereign 55	Brian Hibberd	Maurice Campbell, Wanganui	1:10.68	Rua Rukuna 55	Morar 48
1991	Mr Tiz 58.5	Lance O'Sullivan	Dave & Paul O'Sullivan, Matamata	1:10.28	Anne Of Stratford 52.75	Foreign Influence 47.75
1990	Mr Tiz 52.5	Lance O'Sullivan	Dave & Paul O'Sullivan, Matamata	1:09.83	Este's Park 50.5	Vain Sovereign 51
1989 (Dead Heat)	Mr Tiz 48.5	Lisa Cropp	Dave & Paul O'Sullivan, Matamata	1:10.57	-	Her Royal Highness 48
1989 (Dead Heat)	Westminster 54.5	Maurice Campbell	Ngaire Fraser	1:10.57	-	Her Royal Highness 48
1988	Alynda 48.5	Cathrine Treymane	Alan Jones, Cambridge	1:08.47	Courier Bay 57.5	Spring Easy 49.5
1987	Diamond Lover 51.75	Grant Cooksley	Colin Jillings & Richard Yuill, Takanini	1:07.73	Courier Bay 53.5	High Regards 53.5
1986	Silver Tip 48	Lance O'Sullivan	Dave & Paul O'Sullivan, Matamata	1:08.37	Wrens Trophy 47.5	Princess Dram 52
1985	Ardee One 47	Roy McKay	Bill Weal, Te Awamutu	1:08.63	War Like 47.5	Romantic Bay 47.5
1984	Pinson 53	Gary Phillips	Don Couchman, Hawera	1:09.69	Flying Dream 47.5	Ebony Belle 47.5
1983	So Dandy 53.5	David Walsh	Keith Opie, Te Aroha	1:09.69	Our Shah 57	Pia Roona 53
1982	Valencia 51.5	Greg Childs	Jim Gibbs, Matamata	1:11.34	Our Shah 53.5 / Kerryman 51 (dead heat)	-
1981	Gold Hope 49	David Peake	Ray Verner, Takanini	1:10.87	Valencia 51	Royal Fencer 52.5
1980	Arbre Chene 55.5	Alvin Tweedie	Clive Bennett, Pukekoe	1:13.2	Babbling Brooke 53.5	Luck Roona 52.5
1979	Al Donte 49.5	Rodney Heaslip	Don Sellwood, Hastings	1:11.31	Babbling Brooke 53.5	Lady Belle 56.5
1978	Silver Liner 52.5	Brent Thomson	Eric Ropiha, Woodville	1:10.58	Silver Wraith 48	Sly Wink 50
1977	Tudor Light 55.5	Warwick Robinson	John Malcolm, Te Rapa	1:11.5	Blue Blood	Chrisarda
1976	Marinoto 49.5	Danny Southworth	F M Walsh, Inglewood	1:10.9	Blue Blood 57.5	Glengarick 50
1975	Shifnal Chief 59	Bob Skelton	I M & J R Cameron, Taupiri	1:11	Soliloquy	Blanco Sol
1974	Blue Blood 50	David Peake	Ray Verner, Takanini	1:10	Sharif 54.5	Ernader 52.5
1973	Lilt 8.13	Bob Skelton	Ray Bain, Hastings	1:10		
1972	Ajasco 8.8	Bruce Marsh	Eric Ropiha, Woodville	1:12.6	New Moon	Tauporae
1971	Sharivari 8.12	Grenville Hughes	Colin Jillings, Takanini	1:10		Tauporae
1970	Mayo Gold 8.12	Brian Andrews	Ray Wallace, Takanini	1:09.8		

== See also ==
- Recent winners of major NZ sprint races
- Telegraph Handicap
- Waikato Sprint
- Auckland Cup
- Aotearoa Classic
- Karaka Million
- Zabeel Classic
