= Manawatu Sires Produce Stakes =

- Class: Group I
- Location: Awapuni Racecourse; Palmerston North, New Zealand
- Inaugurated: 1908
- Race type: Thoroughbred – Flat racing
- Website: Awapuni Racecourse

Race information
- Distance: 1,400 metres (7 furlongs)
- Surface: Turf
- Track: Left-handed
- Qualification: Two-year-olds
- Weight: Set-Weights
- Purse: $550,000 (2026)

The Manawatu Sires Produce Stakes is a Group One horse race held for Thoroughbred two-year-olds at Awapuni Racecourse in Palmerston North, New Zealand run over 1400 metres in late March or early April.

The race was first run in 1908 over 1200 metres with the current distance being adopted in 1926.

It and the Ellerslie Sires Produce Stakes currently known as the Sistema Stakes (1200m), are regarded as New Zealand's best two-year-old races.

It is currently raced on the same day as the:

- Group 2 Awapuni Gold Cup over 2000m for open class horses.
- Group 3 Manawatu Classic over 2000m for 3YO horses.
- Listed Flying Handicap over 1400m for Open Handicap runners.

Notable winners include:

- Avantage (2018), winner of 9 Group 1 races.
- Daryl's Joy (1969), winner of the 1969 Victoria Derby and Cox Plate as well as 6 races in the United States including the Del Mar Handicap.
- Desert Gold (1915), winner of 36 races.
- La Mer (1976), winner of 24 races.
- Melody Belle (2017), winner of 14 Group 1 races.

Desert Gold and La Mer both won the Awapuni Gold Cup.

== Results Since 1969 ==
There was no race in 2020 due to COVID-19 restrictions. In 2024 to 2026 the race was held at Trentham Racecourse due to track issues at Awapuni.

Year	Winner	Sex	Sire	Dam	Jockey	Trainer(s)	Owner(s)	Time	Second	Third
2026 (Trentham)	Seize The Day 57	C	I Am Invincible (Aus)	Zimaretto (Aus)	Opie Bosson	Mark Walker & Sam Bergerson	Te Akau 2025 Magic Colts Breeding Syndicate	1:24.09 (soft)	Sweetest Thing 55	Speed Demon 57
2025 (Trentham)	La Dorada 55	F	Super Seth (Aus)	Gold Fever	Michael McNab	Mark Walker & Sam Bergerson, Matamata	Te Akau Solid Gold Racing Partnership	1:22.64 (soft)	Hostility 57	Tajana 55
2024 (Trentham)	Move To Strike 57	C	I Am Invincible (Aus)	No Evidence Needed	Wiremu Pinn	Mark Walker & Sam Bergerson, Matamata	Te Akau 2023 Stallion Breeding Syndicate	1:23.69 (soft)	Red Sea 57	Captured By Love 55
2023	Pignan 55	F	Staphanos (Jap)	Hirondelle	Joe Doyle	Lisa Latta, Awapuni	Andy Rennie, Christian Cullen, David Monnery	1:23.93 (soft)	Aprilia 55	To Catch A Thief 57
2022	Maven Belle 55.5	F	Burgundy (NZ)	Doyenne, by Kilimanjaro (GB)	Sam Weatherley	Mark Walker, Matamata	Te Akau Maven Belle Racing Partnership (Mgr: Karyn Fenton-Ellis MNZM)	1:23.27 (good)	Wolverine 55.5	Waitak 57.5
2021	On The Bubbles 56.5	G	Brazen Beau (Aus)	More Bubbles (Aus)	Johnathan Parkes	Jamie Richards, Matamata	Te Akau Splash of Dom Racing Partnership	1:25.98 (heavy)	I Wish I Win 56.5	Bonny Lass 54.5
2019	Yourdeel 56.5	G	Dundeel	Miss Zapper	Opie Bosson	Jamie Richards, Matamata	C A Rutten, C J B Norwood & R N Preston	1:22.98 (good)	Aretha 54.5	Bella Mente 54.5
2018	Avantage 54.5	F	Fastnet Rock (Aus)	Asavant	Danielle Johnson	Stephen Autridge & Jamie Richards, Matamata	Te Akau Avantage Syndicate	1:23.43 (soft)	Melt 54.5	Sir Nate 56.5
2017	Melody Belle 54.5	F	Commands (Aus)	Meleka Belle	Michael McNab	Stephen Autridge & Jamie Richards, Matamata	Fortuna Melody Belle Syndicate	1:25.54 (heavy)	Belle du Nord, 54.5	Joyfilly 54.5
2016	Luna Rossa 54.5	F	Written Tycoon (Aus)	Wild Promises (Aus)	Lisa Allpress	Murray Baker & Andrew Forsman, Cambridge	Jomara Bloodstock Ltd	1:29.13 (heavy)	Sicario 57.0	Saracino 56.5
2015	Marky Mark 56.5	G	Makfi (GB)	My My Maree (Aus)	Leith Innes	Moira Murdoch	B J & J E A Lindsay	1:22.74	Rocanto 56.5	Reminisce 54.5
2014	O'Marilyn 54.5	F	O’Reilly	Monroe Magic	Samantha Spratt	Stephen McKee, Ardmore	T J McKee & B E Rissetto	1:24.46	Prince Mambo 56.5	Artic Wolf 56.5
2013	Recite 54.5	F	Darci Brahma	Chant	Mark Du Plessis	John Bary, Hastings	The Oaks Stud	1:23.25	Al Strada 56.5	Constellation 54.5
2012	Choice Bro 56.5	G	Choisir (Aus)	Ladidi (Aus)	Jonathan Riddell	John Sargent	G T Burgess, R W Edwards et al.	1:22.87	Magic Shaft (Aus) 56.5	Warhorse 56.5
2011	Anabandana 54.5	F	Anabaa (USA)	Great Notice (USA)	Opie Bosson	Don Sellwood, Cambridge	C J Grace	1:22.80	Antonio Lombardo 56	Dowager Queen 54.5
2010	Nacho Man 56	G	Mr. Nancho (ARG)	El Coriero	Craig Grylls	Michael & Paul Moroney, Matamata	M J Clements, C J Grace et al.	1:23.00	Cellarmaster, 56	Jimmy Choux 56
2009	The Heckler 56	G	Lucky Owners	Comedy Cafe (Aus)	Michael Coleman	Murray & Bjorn Baker, Cambridge	Patrick Hogan, A J Sutherland et al.	1:22.53	St Fevre	St Germaine
2008	Il Quello Veloce 54.5	F	Captain Rio (GB)	Nishaani	Noel Harris	John Sargent	Flying Fillies Syndicate	1:22.88	Captain Fantastic	San Bernardino
2007	Nightlign 56	C	Align (Aus)	Indian Squaw	Michael Coleman	Keith Hawtin	C H Lo	1:23.05	Fleur De’Here	Alamosa
2006	Jokers Wild 55.5	C	Black Minnaloushe (USA)	Miss Rory (Aus)	Jim Collett	Michael Moroney & Andrew Scott, Matamata	N Cater et al.	1:22.77	Never Look Back	Habana
2005	Kindacross 55.5	G	Capecross (Ire)	Kindness	Hayden Tinsley	Mark Walker, Matamata	S Alexander et al.	1:23.98	Wahid	Howmuchyacharging
2004	Keeninsky 55.5	C	Stravinsky (USA)	So Keen	Allan Peard	Graeme Rogerson & Stephen Autridge	D & J Carter, Hall & Rogerson	1:23.37	Manten	Egyptian Ra
2003	Maroofity 55.5	G	Maroof (US)	Howkudai	Lance O'Sullivan	Mark Walker, Matamata	Tauranga Racing Syndicate	1:24.37	Katana	Quite Astute
2002	Grout 55.5	G	Gold Brose (Aus)	Kaapstad Glamour	Michael Walker	Allan Sharrock, New Plymouth	Ron & Noel Stanley	1:24.81	Danroad	Pulitzer
2001	San Luis 55	C	Flying Spur (Aus)	Star Style Girl (Aus)	Noel Harris	Chris McNab, Cambridge	November Syndicate	1:22.42	Vinaka	Kapiston
2000	Little Jamie 55	G	St. Jude (Aus)	Little Carey	Lance O'Sullivan	Paul O'Sullivan, Matamata	Watson Bloodstock Ltd et al.	1:24.83	Trinity College	Spring Rain
1999	One Under 54	F	Volksraad (GB)	Reg's Lady	Vincent Colgan	Roger James, Cambridge	D F & Mrs P D & Mrs Bodle, CJ & Mrs Davison	1:24.63	Tristachine	High Grove
1998	Happyanunoit 53.5	F	Yachtie (Aus)	Easter Queen (Aus)	Reece Jones	Michael Moroney, Matamata	Mrs A & P A Moroney	1:23.54	So Casual	Seasquill
1997	Kilmore Quay 53.5	F	Yachtie (Aus)	Startrix	Tony Allan	John Wheeler, New Plymouth	J G & Mrs T A Donovan, J R & Mrs L J Wheeler	1:28.74	Dandy Dancer	Petrov
1996	Love To Dance 53.5	F	Citidancer (IRE)	Peerage	Phillip Mercer	Richard Bothwell, Stratford	P L McKenzie, T Shahabuddin, Mrs J & R E T Teo	1:28.19	Genuine Strike	The Red Express
1995	Ballroom Babe 54	F	Citidancer (IRE)	Taimian	Noel Harris	Graeme Sanders, Te Awamutu	B D Old, K W Pennell & G K Sanders	1:27.54	Robin's Law	Captive
1994	Moonshine 53.5	F	Sound Reason (CAN)	Sister Moonshine	Shane Udy	Trevor & Stephen McKee, Takanini	T J McKee	1:25.54	Asahi	Critical Point
1993	Snap 53.5	F	Kingdom Bay	Crackle	Jim Collett	Dave & Paul O'Sullivan, Matamata	Mrs L M A O’Sullivan & Lord Tavistock	1:23.09	Seascay	Romar
1992	Roy's Boy 55	G	Blue Eyed Boy (IRE)	Gammon	Eddie Wilkinson	David Eagar, Stratford	D W, E J & R J Eagar	1:24.07	Hulastrike	Show Prince
1991	Konig 55	G	Truly Vain (Aus)	Janice	Matthew Enright	David Enright, Foxton	L H N & Y M Wilson	1:23.83	Rua Rukuna	Grand Jette
1990	Lycra 53.5	F	Tights (USA)	Katie Louise (Aus)	Ross Elliot	John Wheeler, New Plymouth	A L Gallagher & G Rutherford	1:24.91	Indian Kingdom	Milton Magic
1989	Cordero 55	G	Centaine (Aus)	Neon Lass	Linda Ballantyne	Robert & Bruce Priscott, Te Awamutu	Karaka Heights Partnership Syndicate	1:23.94	Centime	Super Fiesta
1988	Pompeii Pearl 53.5	F	Pompeii Court (USA)	Pearl Harbour	David Walsh	Nigel Auret, Wanganui	J H, Mrs DA Auret	1:23.83	Straight Order	Come Racing
1987	Satisfy 55	C	Top Quality	Gold Flake	Jim Walker	Nicola Nicoloff	N & P Nicoloff	1:25.23	Glorious Way (Aus)	Open Terrain
1986	Precocious Lad 55	C	Otehi Bay (Aus)	Javan's (Aus)	Earl Harrison	Alan Jones, Cambridge	D E David	1:23.62	Pace Setter	Rieker
1985	Star board 55	C	Star Way (USA)	Lieder	Jim Walker	B Peatley, Waikanae	B Petley & A D P Williams	1:23.5	Honour Bright	Lisa Bay
1984	Vin d’Amour 56	F	Adios II (GB)	Gliterem	Jim Cassidy	Jeff Lynds	J A Higg	1:24.6	Kingdom Bay	Shumanshu
1983	Nordic Seal 51.5	F	Imperial Seal (GB)	Nordia	Garry Phillips	John Wheeler, New Plymouth	J R & J L Wheeler	1:24.3	Tangent	Tanalyse
1982	Andretti 55.5	C	Shifnal (Aus)	Hi Fujin	Earl Harrison	John Thurston, Cambridge	R F Marsh & J L Thurston	1:23	Romantic Bay	Long Range
1981	Scotch Reel 55.5	C	Blarney Kiss (USA)	Floral Show	Bruce Compton	Colin Stuart, Cambridge	C R & Mrs R K Stuart	1:28.8	Loughanure	Shylock
1980	Summer Haze 56	F	Princely Note (GB)	Karinda	Greg Childs	Richard Bothwell, Stratford	Mrs G M Bryant	1:30.8	Yir Tiz	Glamour Bay
1979	Young Shaun 53.5	C	Kirrama	Double Game	S G Royal	S Munro, Matamata	Mrs M J Wilson	1:31.3	Judena	Tiger Jones
1978	Teddy Doon 52.5	C	Rapier II (GB)	Smokey City	Wawrick Robinson	Graeme Rogerson, Te Rapa	I W Allan	1:24.2	Avenger	Tang
1977	Lunar Probe 55.5	C	Ring Round The Moon	Major Effort	Chris McNab	Bill & Graeme Sanders, Te Awamutu	K M & Mrs Davis	1:25	Sly Wink	Heidelberg
1976	La Mer 50	F	Copenhagen II (GB)	La Balsa	Des Harris	Malcolm Smith, New Plymouth	Est L A Alexander	1:23	Elton	Vice Regal
1975	March Legend 55.5	C	Idomeneo (GB)	Gretel	John Riordan	Bill & Graeme Sanders, Te Awamutu	D R Nash	1:24.8	Shy Princess	Dive Bomber
1974	Black Willow 51	F	Sobig	Kathleigh	Bill Skelton	Eric Temperton, Awapuni	P G Aldridge, G D Finlay & R Newmans	1:28.4	Jealous Lover	Drawn n Show
1973	Prince Shifnal 8.4	G	Shifnal (Aus)	Our Vixen	Bob Skelton	Bill Winder, Cambridge	G R Martin	1:23.2		
1972	Longfella 8.10	C	Shy Boy (GB)	Longhill	Roger Lang	Miss Margaret Bull	Miss MJ Bull & Mrs H Stokes	1:24.2		
1971	Gold Braid 8.3	C	Battle-Waggon (GB)	Bonny Fair, by Fair's Fair (GB)	Keith Opie	Rory McGovern, Matamata	A S & D S Allen	1:24.4		
1970	Rich Return 8.9	F	Rich Gift (GB)	Grand Return	Bruce Marsh	Brian Hayter, Hawera	B Hayter	1:28.2		
1969	Daryl's Joy 8.12	C	Stunning (GB)	Rutha	Bruce Marsh	Syd Brown, Woodville	R K C Goh	1:24.8		

== Earlier Winners ==
- 1968 - Mayo Gold
- 1967 - Mannix
- 1966 - Raidan
- 1965 - Jetmate
- 1964 - Rio
- 1963 - Gold Chat
- 1962 - Blyton
- 1961 - Cabriere
- 1960 - Marengo
- 1959 - Gayfair
- 1958 - Up and Coming
- 1957 - Miss Able
- 1956 - Passive
- 1955 - Romanos
- 1954 - Royal Applause
- 1953 - Timanah
- 1952 - Flying Queen
- 1951 - Taringaroa
- 1950 - The Unicorn
- 1949 - Gold Script
- 1948 - Joyful Lady
- 1947 - Great Trek
- 1946 - Robin's Reward
- 1945 - Royal Raider
- 1944 - Subdued
- 1943 - Virtuoso
- 1942 - Nizam
- 1941 - Premature
- 1940 - Phaleron
- 1939 - Submission
- 1938 - Defaulter
- 1937 - Smoke Screen
- 1936 - Custos
- 1935 - Legatee
- 1934 - Burnish
- 1933 - Golden Hair
- 1932 - Midinette
- 1931 - High Comedy
- 1930 - Gesture
- 1929 - Gay Ballerina
- 1928 - Episode
- 1927 - Thaw
- 1926 - Limerick
- 1925 - Lady Cavendish
- 1924 - Motley
- 1923 - Tukia
- 1922 - The Dunce
- 1921 - Absurdum
- 1920 - Little River
- 1919 - Warplane
- 1918 - Finmark
- 1917 - Estland
- 1916 - Hyttus
- 1915 - Desert Gold
- 1914 - Charmilla
- 1913 - Rinaldo
- 1912 - Ermengarde
- 1911 - Peirene
- 1910 - no race
- 1909 - Polymorphous
- 1908 - Maori King

== See also ==
- Thoroughbred racing in New Zealand
- Awapuni Gold Cup
- Karaka Million
- New Zealand Derby
