= Sistema Stakes =

Ellerslie Sires Produce Stakes
- Class: Group I
- Location: Ellerslie Racecourse, Auckland, New Zealand
- Race type: Thoroughbred – Flat racing
- Website: Ellerslie Racecourse

Race information
- Distance: 1,200 metres (6 furlongs)
- Surface: Turf
- Track: Right-handed
- Qualification: Two-year-olds
- Weight: Set-Weights

The Ellerslie Sires Produce Stakes, currently known as the Sistema Stakes, is a Group One horse race for Thoroughbred two-year-olds held at Ellerslie Racecourse.

Run over 1200 metres on Champions Day in March, it is regarded as one of New Zealand's best two-year-old races along with the Manawatu Sires Produce Stakes (1400 m) at Awapuni, Palmerston North.

The race has also been called the Diamond Stakes or Auckland Diamond Stakes.

== Recent results ==
Year	Winner	Wgt	Sex	Sire	Dam	Jockey	Trainer(s)	Owner(s)	Time	Second	Third
2026	Lara Antipova	55	f	Russian Revolution (Aus)	Artistic Lass (Aus)	Michael Dee	Mark Walker & Sam Bergerson	Fortuna Lara Antipova Syndicate (Mgr: John Galvin)	1:10.75 (soft)	Liguria 55	State Of Valour 57
2025	Return To Conquer (Aus)	57	c	Snitzel (Aus)	Vaujany (Aus)	Blake Shinn	Mark Walker & Sam Bergerson	Te Akau 2024 Stallion Breeding Syndicate	1:11.44 (soft)	Landlock 57	To Cap It All 55
2024	Velocious	55	f	Written Tycoon (Aus)	Parmalove (Aus)	Samantha Spratt	Stephen Marsh	Go Racing Burrata Syndicate	1:11.88 (good)	Archaic Smile 55	Captured By Love 55
2023	Ulanova	55	f	Santos	The Fairy's Kiss	Craig Grylls	Stephen Marsh	Gandharvi Pty Ltd, Telluride Agency & D W Wallace	1:11.27 (soft)	Tulsi 55	To Catch A Thief 57
2022	Lickety Split	54.5	f	Turn Me Loose	She's Slinky	Matthew Cameron	Murray Baker & Andrew Forsman	M Delahunty, D & T Hawkins, Mrs C A & N D Hewson, J & M Kilkenny	1:10.44 (dead)	Dynastic 56.5	Maven Belle 54.5
2021	Sword Of State	56.5	c	Snitzel (Aus)	In The Vanguard (Aus)	Opie Bosson	Jamie Richards	Te Akau 2020 Four Colts Breeding Syndicate	1:09.55 (dead)	On The Bubbles 56.5	Bonny Lass 54.5
2020	Cool Aza Beel	56.5	c	Savabeel (Aus)	Cool ‘n’ Sassy (Aus)	Opie Bosson	Jamie Richards	Te Akau Sassy Beel Syndicate	1:10.46 (good)	Vernazza 54.5	Kelly Renee 54.5
2019	Yourdeel	56.5	g	Dundeel	Miss Zapper (Aus)	Opie Bosson	Jamie Richards		1:12.61 (heavy)	Aalaalune 54.5	Aretha 54.5
2018	Sword Of Osman	56.5	g	Savabeel (Aus)	Bunyah (Ire)	Opie Bosson	Stephen Autridge & Jamie Richards	Te Akau Great Sword Syndicate	1:09.79 (good)	Avantage (AUS) 54.5	Spanish Whisper (AUS) 54.5
2017	Summer Passage (AUS)	56.5	c	Snitzel (Aus)	Subsequent (Aus)	Blake Shinn	Lance O'Sullivan & Andrew Scott	Hermitage Thoroughbreds Pty Ltd	1:10.48 (dead)	Star Treasure 56.5	Gold Fever 54.5
2016	Heroic Valour (AUS)	56.5	c	Fastnet Rock (Aus)	Myrrh (NZ)	Jonathan Riddell	Stephen Autridge & Jamie Richards	Te Akau 2015 Breeding Syndicate	1:09.80 (good)	Wyndspelle 56.5	O'Rachael (AUS) 54.5
2015	Dal Cielo	56.5	c	Per Incanto (USA)	Cent From Heaven	Opie Bosson	Murray Baker & Andrew Forsman		1:10.66 (good)	Battle Time 56.5	Rocanto 56.5
2014	Vespa	56.5	c	Elusive City (USA)	Miss Avalon (Ire)	Mark Du Plessis	Johno Benner		1:11.70 (good)	O’Marilyn (AUS) 54.5	Platinum Balos (AUS) 54.5
2013	Ruud Awakening (AUS)	54.5	f	Bernardini (USA)	Dawn Almighty (Aus)	Opie Bosson	Stephen Marsh		1:08.78 (good)	Bounding (AUS) 54.5	Al Strada 56.5
2012	Warhorse	56.5	c	General Nediym (Aus)	Rathlin Island (Aus)	Opie Bosson	Jason Bridgman, Matamata	Tang Weng Fei	1:11.84 (dead)	Rollout The Carpet (AUS) 54.5 (relegated from 1st)	Silk Pins 54.5
2011	Anabandana (AUS)	54.5	f	Anabaa (USA)	Great Notice (USA)	Opie Bosson	Don Sellwood	Chris Grace	1:08.35 (good)	Fort Lincoln (AUS) 56	Chateauneuf Dupape 56
2010	Banchee	54.5	f	Oratorio (Ire)	Miss Jessie Jay	Leith Innes	John Sargent	Sir Peter Vela	1:09.72 (good)	Cellarmaster 56	Jimmy Choux 56
2009	Kaaptan	56	g	Kaapstad	Fanny Black	Craig Grylls (a)	Stephen McKee, Ardmore	Trevor McKee	1:12.34 (dead)	Seven Schillings 54.5	Corsage 54.5
2008	Fully Fledged	56	c	Align (Aus)	Fledged	Leith Innes	Murray Baker, Cambridge	A J Sutherland, A C Timpson & P J Walker	1:11.41 (dead)	Raid 54.5	Il Quello Veloce 54.5
2007	Alamosa	56	c	O'Reilly	Lodore Mystic	Gavin Mckeon	Peter McKay		1:10.39 (good)	El Cuento (AUS) 56	Satinka 54.5
2006	Jokers Wild	56	c	Black Minnaloushe (USA)	Miss Rory (Aus)	Michael Coleman	Mike and Paul Moroney	John Carter, Garry Christini & Barbara Paterson	1:09.57 (good)	Chant 54.5	Italia 54.5
2005	Mi Jubilee	54	f	Howbaddouwantit (USA)	Mi Steel	David Walker	Stephen Crutchley, Wanganui	G J Lambert	1:08.98 (firm)	Darci Brahma 55.5	Wahid 55.5
2004	Iflooxcouldkill	54	f	Daggers Drawn	Hear's Hoping	Leith Innes	Paul O'Sullivan	M & N Carroll, K Devine, A J & C Sutherland	1:14.06 (soft)	Egyptian Ra	Velasco
2003	Maroofity	55.5	g	Maroof (USA)	Howkudai	Lance O'Sullivan	Mark Walker		1:12.72 (slow)	Alastro (Aus) 56	Sarah Vee (Aus) 56
2002 April	Grout	55.5	g	Gold Brose (Aus)	Kaapstad Glamour	Michael Walker	Alan Sharrock	Ron and Noel Stanley	1:25.71 (dead, 1400m)	Danceinthesun 56	Pulitzer 56
2001	Kapiston	54.5	f	Lake Coniston (Ire)	Kapetoile	Michael Coleman	Mike Moroney & Andrew Scott		1:23.28 (good, 1400m)	San Luis (Aus) 54	Flying Babe (Aus) 56
2000	Winged Foot	55.5	c	Maroof (USA)	Ricamo	Gary Grylls	Robert Priscott, Te Awamutu	J C Clayton, J R Hughes, T W Jarvis & B K Osmand	1:23.84 (easy, 1400m)	Hey Pronto 55.5	Ma Victoire 54.5

In 2023 the first horse past the winning post, Tokyo Tycoon, was disqualified due to a post-race positive result to meloxicam.

== Past winners ==
The following are past winners of the race.

- 1999 - One Under (Vincent Colgan}
- 1998 - Zola (Opie Bosson)
- 1993 - Do Si Do (Jim Collett)
- 1987 - Spyglass (D R Johnson)
- 1986 - Precocious Lad (E Harrison)
- 1985 - All Glory (Greg Childs)
- 1984 - Fothers (Debbie Healey)
- 1983 - Vite Cheval (Debbie Healey)
- 1982 - Andretti (E Harrison)
- 1981 - Loughanure (Noel Harris)
- 1980 - Paddy Boy (Greg Childs)

== See also ==
- Auckland Cup
- Bonecrusher New Zealand Stakes
- Karaka Million
- New Zealand Derby
- Thoroughbred racing in New Zealand
