= Mufhasa Classic =

Horse race in New Zealand

TAB Mufhasa Classic
- Class: Group I
- Location: Trentham Racecourse; Wellington, New Zealand
- Race type: Thoroughbred - Flat racing
- Sponsor: Rydges Wellington (2021)
- Website: www.trentham.co.nz

Race information
- Distance: 1,600 metres
- Surface: Turf
- Track: Left-handed
- Qualification: Open
- Weight: Weight-for-age
- Purse: $400,000 (2024)

The Mufhasa Classic is a Group 1 Thoroughbred horse race run at weight-for-age over a distance of 1,600 metres (1 mile) at Trentham Racecourse in Wellington, New Zealand. Known for many years as the Captain Cook Stakes, in 2023 it became known as the TAB Classic before being renamed the Mufhasa Classic.

Over the years the race has been won by great New Zealand racehorses such as Rough Habit (1992), Solveig (1986) and Copper Belt (1977).

== History ==
=== Name ===
- Marlboro Mile (1977-1979)
- Penfolds-Chardon Mile (1980-1981)
- DB Mile (1982-1983)
- Double Brown 1600 (1984-1985)
- Double Brown Mile (1986-1988)
- DB Draught 1600 (1989)
- Captain Cook Stakes (1990-2000)
- Fayette Park Prized Stakes (2001)
- Captain Cook Stakes (2002–2022)
- TAB Classic (2023)
- TAB Mufhasa Classic (2024)

=== Race Date ===
- Run In March (1977-1997)
- Run In October (1997-2008)
- Run In December (2009–Present)

In 2009 the Wellington Racing Club changed the race date from the end of October to the beginning of December, to move it away from the Hawke's Bay Spring Carnival races such as the Spring Classic. Instead the Captain Cook Stakes was fitted in to be three to four weeks after the Coupland's Bakeries Mile [Churchill Stakes] at Riccarton in November and three weeks before the Zabeel Classic [Galaxy Stakes] at Ellerslie on Boxing Day.

== Results ==
Year	Stake	Winner	Sire	Dam	Jockey	Trainer(s)	Owner(s)	Time	Second	Third
2025	$400,00	Provence 57	Savabeel	Sombreuil (Aus)	George Rooke	Stephen Marsh	T V Rider & Social Racing Winners Circle Syndicate	1:36.09	Waitak	La Crique
2024	$400,000	Ladies Man	Zed	Just Polite	Opie Bosson	Allan Sharrock	FJ, HT, LL & MJ O'Leary, SA Sharrock, Mrs KM, NH, RT & Mrs SL Stanley	1:35.04	La Crique	Perfect Scenario
2023	$400,000	Desert Lightning	Pride of Dubai	Isstoora	Vincent Colgan	Peter & Dawn Williams	Barneswood Farm Ltd for S C Green & G C Beemsterboer	1:35.05	Faraglioni	Malt Time
2022	$300,000	Prise De Fer	Savabeel	Foiled	Michael McNab	Mark Walker	Te Akau En Garde Syndicate	1:38.14	Aegon	Chase
2021 (Te Rapa)	$220,000	Two Illicit	Jimmy Choux	Gemini	Danielle Johnson	Roger James & Robert Wellwood, Cambridge	Brent & Cherry Taylor, Faith Taylor, Jane Taylor & Scott Malcolm	1:34.39	Prise De Fer	Tiptronic
2020	$200,000	Rock On Wood	Redwood	Rock On Rye	Ryan Elliot	Leanne Elliot, Levin	L E Elliot, J Ker & Y J Ker	1:39.66	Concert Hall	Deerfield
2019	$200,000	Wyndspelle	Iffraaj	Western Star	Jason Waddell	Johno Benner & Hollie Wynyard, Otaki	J Frew, S Hanna, Jen Campin Bloodstock Ltd & NP Randles	1:34.66	Shadows Cast	True Enough
2018	$200,000	Danzdanzdance	Mastercraftsman	Night Danza	Opie Bosson	Chris Gibbs & Michelle Bradley, Ruakaka	BAX Bloodstock Achieving Xcellence Ltd, S Barnao, M Hawes, J Loose, R J Stern, R Tierney & L Wotton	1:36.58	Authentic Paddy	Our Abbadean
2017	$200,000	Kawi	Savabeel	Magic Time	Jason Waddell	Allan Sharrock, New Plymouth	AA Baeyertz, JP Goodin, T Kemp, GA Macdonald, GH Phillips, BR & SA Sharrock	1:36.28 (dead)	Consensus	Sofia Rosa
2016	$200,000	Aide Memoire	Remind	Explain	Robert Hannam	Fraser Auret, Marton	MJ Askew, MI Deans, D Garraway, CJ Gerbs, A Groves & DE Tuffery	1:35.87 (dead)	Authentic Paddy	Ringo
2015	$200,000	Julinsky Prince	Darci Brahma	Julinsky Princess	Johnathan Parkes	Fraser Auret, Marton	Bromley Bloodstock Ltd	1:38.73	Authentic Paddy	Soriano
2014	$200,000	Shuka	Bachelor Duke	Alabama Rose	Danielle Johnson	Peter & Dawn Williams, Byerley Park	Parr Bloodstock Ltd	1:37.53	Nashville / Puccini (dead heat)	-
2013	$200,000	Shuka	Bachelor Duke	Alabama Rose	Danielle Johnson	Peter & Dawn Williams, Byerley Park	Parr Bloodstock Ltd	1:35.42	Viadana	Brave Centaur
2012	$200,000	Final Touch	Kashani	My Lydia	Chris Johnson	John & Karen Parsons, Balciarn	Mrs K G Parsons	1:35.91	Lady Kipling / Mufhasa	n/a
2011	$200,000	Mufhasa	Pentire	Sheila Cheval	Samantha Spratt	Stephen McKee, Ardmore	D L, Ms N N & S C Archer & Mrs D J Wright	1:36.40 (good)	Vonusti	Dating
2010	$200,000	We Can Say It Now	Starcraft	We Can't Say That	Lisa Allpress	Murray & Bjorn Baker, Cambridge	Paulyn Investments Pty Ltd	1:34.04	Mandela	Obsession
2009 (December)	$200,000	Ekstreme	Ekraar	Cashcade	Opie Bosson	Bryce Revell, New Plymouth	Waimea Racing Syndicate	1:36.32	Veloz	Fritzy Boy
2008	$200,000	Dezigna	Volksraad	Label Basher	Troy Harris	Vanessa & Wayne Hillis, Matamata	Mrs M.E.A. Evans	1:44.65 (heavy 11)	O'Ceirins Angel	Bulginbaah
2007	$200,000	Dorabella	Postponed	Caserio	Hayden Tinsley	Howie & Lorraine Matthews, Otaki	D Ha	1:34.50	Seachange	Porotene Gem
2006	$150,000	Jurys Out	Faltaat (USA)	Tarantia	Michael Coleman	David & Sarah Haworth, Foxton	D Mck & KM Duncan & DR Haworth	1:35.42	Rosina Lad	Sir Slick
2005	$100,000	Hurrah	Bahhare (USA)	Shock Attack	Hayden Tinsley	Shane Kennedy & Ricky Carston, Riccarton	GF Kirkpatrick, PB McLaughlin, TJ O'Shannessey, KJ Smith, MR Spinks, PW Timbs & BJ Vieceli	1:35.81	Millenium	Jurys Out
2004 (Otaki)	$100,000	Rodin	Masterpiece	Fine Decision	Darryl Bradley	Karen Zimmerman, Otaki	Victory Park Syndicate & Ywurree Syndicate	1:36.95	Keeninsky	Rapid Kay
2003	$100,000	Penny Gem	Pentire	Gemscap (by Maizcay)	Michael Coleman	Michael Moroney & Andrew Scott, Matamata	AF & Mrs CI Abel, AK Bell, CW Cherrie, PA Moroney & BA Schroder	1:34.57	Marie Clare	Hustler
2002 Dead heat	$100,000	Elevenses	Star Way	Celtic Joy	Leith Innes	Debbie & Graeme Sanders, Te Awamutu	Elevenses Syndicate	1:38.33	n/a	Hello Dolly
2002 Dead heat	$100,000	Tit For Taat	Faltaat	Miss Kiwitea	Michael Walker	W Herbert, Riwa Park	RI & Est Late WD Scott	1:38.33	n/a	Hello Dolly
2001	$100,000	Hello Dolly	Mi Perferido	Drambuie	Bruce Herd	Bill Wills, Cambridge	W G Wills	1:42.3 (Heavy)	Cinder Bella	Fritz
2000	$100,000	Cinder Bella	Victory Dance (Ire)	Lucky Jewell	Lance O'Sullivan	Karen Zimmerman, Otaki	Messrs BM Hancock & CJG McFarlane	1:25.47 (1400m)	Integrate	Sir Howard
1999	$100,000	Cent Home 57	Lord Ballina (AUS)	Centurial	Lance O'Sullivan	Jim Wallace, Opaki	Jim Wallace	1:34.75	Hero	Batavian
1998 (Hastings) (October)	$100,000	Foxwood	Centaine (AUS)	Delia's Choice	Vincent Colgan	Roger James, Cambridge	Mrs HA & JM Hannan	1:33.75	Danske	Just Anything
1997 (October)	$100,000	Super Crest	Super Imposing	Top Spray	Noel Harris	John Sargent			Marconee	Batavian
1997 (March)	$80,000	Ballroom Babe 55.5	Citidancer	Taimian	Gary Grylls	Graeme Sanders, Te Awamutu	BD Old, KW Pennell & GK Sanders	1:36.81	Kingston Bay	Ed
1996	$80,000	Marquise	Gold and Ivory (USA)	Eight Carat (GB)	Jim Collett	Laurie Laxon, Cambridge	Messrs MK Glenn & MH Oram	1:35.31	Corndale	Diablo Girl
1995	$80,000	Allegro	Red Tempo	Gallant Heights	Gary Grylls	Chris & Colleen Wood, Cambridge	Henry & Pamela Ward	1:33.60	Avedon	Lord Tridan
1994	$80,000	Lord Tridan	Lord Ballina (AUS)	Salaprime	Gary Grylls	Michael Moroney & Graeme Richardson, Matamata	Mrs DM, JF & Mrs MM Connelly	1:34.93	Ball Park	Cuidado
1993	$80,000	Calm Harbour	Spectacular Love (USA)	Sooth (NZ)	Damon Smith	Noel Eales, Awapuni	Peter Thorburn	1:35.17 Dead	On The Beach	Status
1992	$80,000	Rough Habit	Roughcast (USA)	Certain Habit (NZ)	Chris Johnson	John Wheeler, New Plymouth	JA Battiston, Mrs RE Burns, C Rackley & DW Smith	1:35.54	Modena	Rough Harbour
1991	$100,000	Mickey's Town	Icelandic	Walnor	Michael Coleman	Jim Gibbs, Matamata	BJ McCahill Senior	1:35.09	Fun On The Run	Stanmaric
1990	Meeting abandoned									
1989	$62,500	Straight Order	Straight Strike	Nightly Order	Greg Childs	Patrick Campbell, Awapuni	H A & R P Davey	1:33.81	Steeley Dan	Compel
1988	$62,500	Steely Dan	Standaan (Fra)	Miss Jubilee	Lance O'Sullivan	Tony Gillies, Matamata	WT Callaghan, RL Kennedy, JC Parkes & AJJ Parkinson	1:38.94	The Filbert	Abit Leica
1987	$62,500	Magnitude	Amalgam	Beauty Spot	Garry Phillips	Magaret Bull, Hunterville	Miss MJ Bull	1:34.89	The Filbert	Pell Mell
1986	$42,250	Solveig	Imposing (Aus)	Soliloquoy	David Peake	Colin Curnow and Trevor McKee, Takanini	R E & R W E Moore	1:36.48	Canterbury Belle	Pinson
1985	$60,000	So Dandy	So Vain	El Candy	Brian York	Keith Opie, Te Aroha	JL & LGN Erickson	1:39.98	Abit Leica	Super Tai
1984	$60,000	Idaho's Gift	Rich Gift	Veruschka	Earl Harrison	Brian Coleman, New Plymouth	BG Coleman	1:38.49	Super Tai	Dig In
1983	$45,000	Clear Gold	Bahroona	Hebrew Star	Grant Cooksley	IP Morton, Whakatane	Mr & Mrs IP Morton & Mr & Mrs HB Tapper	1:35.7	Super Tai	So Dandy
1982	$45,000	Hikotere	Redolent II	Great Haste	Gary Grylls	TJ Mora, Te Aroha	AJ, Mrs DJ, GD & HJ Prout	1:37.25	Givenchy	Prince Majestic
1981	$40,000	The Twinkle	Gate Keeper	The Pixie ( by Mellay)	Ally Robinson	Dennis Brothers, Woodlands		1:36.25	Mun Lee	Golden Rhapsody
1980	$40,000	Mellseur	Riverton	Belinda's Flight (by Bellborough)	NJ Harnett	Ellis Winsloe, Gore	FC Anscombe & EJ Smart	1:40.75	Scotch Miss	Mun Lee
1979	$26,000	Brutus	Balios	Monde (by Monitor)	Chris McNab	Ray Harris, Tuahiwi	RT Harris, GE Pilkington, RM Smith & Mrs LS Weaver	1:39.5	Copper Bit	Loma Lass
1978	$35,000	March Legend	Idolmeneo	Gretel (by Golovine)	Alwin Tweedie	Don Nash, Takanini	D R Nash	1:35.75	Orchidra	Clive Comet
1977 (March)	$25,000	Copper Belt	Gold Sovereign	Rhodesia (by Blueskin II)	Garry Phillips	Brian Deacon, Hawera	K & Mrs K Gray	1:36.6	Grey Way	On Show

== See also ==
- Thoroughbred racing in New Zealand
- Wellington Cup
- Thorndon Mile
- New Zealand Oaks
- Trentham Stakes
- Zabeel Classic
- New Zealand International/Herbie Dyke Stakes
