= Satisfy (horse) =

New Zealand-bred Thoroughbred racehorse

- Sire: Top Quality
- Grandsire: Shahram
- Dam: Gold Flake
- Damsire: Allgrit
- Sex: Colt
- Foaled: 1984
- Country: New Zealand
- Colour: Brown
- Breeder: R W L Cargill
- Owner: E N, Est late N D & P H Niccoloff
- Record: 88:6-9-9
- Earnings: $520,105

Major wins
- New Zealand Derby (1987)
- Last updated on July 3, 2007

Satisfy is a Thoroughbred racehorse who is best known for winning the New Zealand Derby in 1987.

Satisfy was by Top Quality, out of Gold Flake. He only won six races in his career, but two came at Group 1 level in the form of the Derby and the Manawatu Sires' Produce Stakes. He also ran third in the New Zealand 2000 Guineas.

His Derby win though is more remembered for who didn't win it than who did. Eventual runner-up Accountant was the first horse past the post in the 1987 Derby, but the protest siren was sounded as the horse returned after his triumph and the race was taken away in the enquiry room.

Satisfy was trained by Nick Niccoloff a Whanganui owner-trainer. He was campaigned around New Zealand and Nick was not shy in nominating Satisfy in top races through the late 1980s and early 90s. He proved to be a tough stayer, finishing in the first 5 in half of his 88 races. His honesty and determination earned him many followers.

He sired a small number of horses but none were successful on the track.
