= Mark Du Plessis =

Zimbabwean born jockey

Mark Du Plessis (born 3 October 1975, Rhodesia, now Zimbabwe) is a horse racing jockey. He was champion apprentice jockey in Zimbabwe in 1994/1995 and the winner of Zimbabwe senior jockeys' championship in 1997/1998.

He moved to New Zealand and starting riding in the late 1990s in the North Island. He has won 80 Group and listed races and a current total of 867 victories in New Zealand.

Du Plessis also rode in Singapore. and he rode 60 winners in each of the last two seasons during brief stints in Hong Kong.

In 2018 Mark moved to Australia to continue his career.

== Major wins ==
=== New Zealand ===
- Auckland Cup - Bazelle (2005), Prize Lady (2007), Rock Diva (2015).
- Easter Handicap - Albany Reunion (2014)
- Ellerslie Sires Produce Stakes - Vespa (2014)
- Hawke's Bay Guineas - Sir Andrew (2013).
- Karaka Million 2YO - Vespa (2014)
- Levin Classic - Recite (2014)
- Manawatu Sires Produce Stakes - Recite (2013)
- New Zealand 1000 Guineas - Rollout The Carpet (2012)
- New Zealand International Stakes - Red Ruler (2011)
- New Zealand Oaks - Tapildo (2001)
- New Zealand Stakes - Gaze (2007)
- Otaki-Maori Weight for Age - Star Satire (2001)
- Railway Stakes (New Zealand) - Bounding (2014)
- Telegraph Handicap - Irish Fling (2014)
- Trentham Stakes - Red Ruler (2010)
- Wellington Cup - Red Ruler (2010)

=== Hong Kong ===
- Premier Bowl - Rich Unicorn (2011)
- Prince Jewellery & Watch Premier Cup - Aashiq (2012)

=== Singapore ===
- KrisFlyer International Sprint - Green Birdie (2010)
- Raffles Cup - Zirna (2003)
- Singapore Gold Cup - Zirna (2003), Raul (2004)

=== Australia ===
- Aquis Jewel (1200m) - Kisukano
- George Moore Stakes - Chapter And Verse (2019)
- Victory Stakes - Victorem (2020)
- Magic Millions QTIS (Gold Coast 1300m) - Chapter and Verse (2019).
