= Windsor Park Stud =

Coordinates: 37.9054°S 175.4282°E

Windsor Park Stud is a New Zealand thoroughbred stud farm that was established in 1998. The facility is located on Kampala Road on the south side of Waikato River on the west side of Cambridge, in the Waikato region of the North Island.

Windsor Park was established by Ian and Jesse Duncan. In 1971, it passed ownership to Nelson and Sue Schick and their son Rodney. The operation now occupies around 1,300 acres across three sites.

Windsor Park Stud has sponsored the Windsor Park Plate one of the Hawkes Bay triple crown races held in September.

== Stallions ==
Windsor Park Stud has had a number of top quality stallions including:

Stallion	Born	Sire	Dam	Dam Sire	Racing career	Stud career
Armory	2017 Ireland	Galileo	After	Danehill Dancer	Winner of the Futurity Stakes (Ireland)(1408m, G2), 2019 Tyros Stakes (1408m G3) 2020 Royal Whip Stakes (2012m, G3) & 2021 Huxley Stakes (2076m G2). 2nd in 2020 Cox Plate	Stud fee $10,000 in the 2025 season
Auguste Rodin	2020 Ireland	Deep Impact (Jap)	Rhododendron	Galileo	Winner of the Juvenile Stakes (2022), Vertem Futurity Trophy (2022), Epsom Derby (2023), Irish Derby (2023), Irish Champion Stakes (2023), Breeders' Cup Turf (2023), Prince of Wales's Stakes (2024)	Stud fee $30,000 in the 2025 season
Beaufort Sea	1970 USA	Nashua (USA)	Homeward Bound (GB)	Alycidon (GB)		Sire of Seamist
Charm Spirit	2011 Ireland	Invincible Spirit	L'Enjoleuse	Montjeu	Irish-bred, French trained winner of the 2014 Prix Djebel, Prix Paul de Moussac, Prix Jean Prat, Prix du Moulin and Queen Elizabeth II Stakes	Sire of Aretha, Lilikoi, Spirit of Baz, Utzon
Circus Maximus	2016 Ireland	Galileo	Duntle	Danehill Dancer	Winner of the 2019 Dee Stakes, St James's Palace Stakes, Prix du Moulin and 2020 Queen Anne Stakes	Stud fee $17,500 in the 2025 season
Falkirk	2000 New Zealand	Tale of the Cat	Madam Valeta	Palace Music	4th in King’s Stand Stakes	Passed in 2020. Sire of Amazing Kids, Fay Fay (2012 Hong Kong Derby winner)
Golan	1998 Ireland	Spectrum (Ire)	Highland Gift (Ire)	Generous (Ire)	Winner of the 2000 Guineas Stakes (2001),Prix Niel (2001) and King George VI and Queen Elizabeth Stakes (2002)	Sire of Beauty Flash
Guest of Honour	1975 New Zealand	Decies (GB)	Pandora Lass	Greek God (GB)		
High Chaparral	1999 Ireland	Sadler's Wells	Kasora	Darshaan	Winner of the 2002 Epsom Derby	As a shuttle stallion
Kaapstad	1984 New Zealand	Sir Tristram	Eight Carat	Klairessa	Winner of the 1987 VRC Sires Produce Stakes and Ascot Vale Stakes	Sire of Ashley Grove, Catalan Opening, Cruzeiro, Faience, Golden Sword, Kaaptive Edition, Love Dance, Sprint By, Tall Poppy, Vegas. Died on 8 May 2006
Mongolian Khan	2011 Australia	Holy Roman Emperor	Centafit	Centaine	Australian Derby, New Zealand Derby and Caulfield Cup winner	Stud fee $7,500 in the 2021 season. Was purchased by Jang Jun Stud, Sichuan Province, China in 2023.
Otehi Bay	1973 Australia	Biscay	Denny Lass	Rocky Thumb		Sire of Kingdom Bay and Precocious Lad
Paddington	2020 Great Britain	Siyouni (Fra)	Modern Eagle (Ger)	Montjeu	Winner of the 2023 Irish 2,000 Guineas & Tetrarch Stakes	Stud fee $35,000 in the 2025 season
Pour Moi	2008 Ireland	Montjeu	Gwynn (Ire)	Darshaan	Winner of the 2011 Epsom Derby	Sire of Wings of Eagles
Profondo	2018 Australia	Deep Impact (Jap)	Honesty Prevails (Aus)	Redoute's Choice (Aus)		Stud fee $17,500 in the 2025 season
Rageese	2012 Australia	Street Cry	Rabsha	Dehere	Winner of the 2016 L'Oreal Stakes	Stud fee $5,000 in the 2021 season. Died in March 2023
Rip Van Winkle	2006 Ireland	Galileo	Looking Back	Stravinsky	Dual European G1 winner	Died in 2020. Sire of Dick Whittington, Jennifer Eccles, Subpoenaed and Te Akau Shark
Shamexpress	2009 New Zealand	O'Reilly	Volkrose	Volksraad	Winner of the 2013 VRC Newmarket Handicap	Stud fee $20,000 in the 2021 season. Sire of Ka Ying Rising, Lim's Saltoro, Coventina Bay
Star Way	1977 Great Britain	Star Appeal	New Way	Klarion	Winner of the 1979 Chesham Stakes	Sire of Sky Chase, Filante, Star Board, Elevenses, Bonanova, Nimue, Smiling Like, Waverley Star, Solar Circle, Shankhill Lass, Starjo, Field Dancer, Ray's Hope, Fraternity, Ark Regal, Just A Dancer, Telesto and Interstellar
Thorn Park	1999 Australia	Spinning World (US)	Joy	Bluebird (US)	Nine wins including the 2004 Stradbroke Handicap (Group 1, 1400m)	Sire of Centennial Park, Jimmy Choux, La Etoile, Ocean Park, Te Akau Coup, Te Akau Rose, The Party Stand and Veyron
Turn Me Loose	2011 New Zealand	Iffraaj	Indomitable	Danehill	Winner of the New Zealand 2000 Guineas, 2015 Emirates Stakes (Flemington) and the 2016 Futurity Stakes (Caulfield).	Stud fee $7,500 in the 2025 season
Vanbrugh	2012 Australia	Encosta de Lago	Soho Secret	Lucky Owners		Stud fee $7,500 in the 2025 season
Volksraad	1988 Great Britain	Green Desert (USA)	Celtic Assembly (USA)	Secretariat		Six times New Zealand champion sire

All stud fees are exclusive of GST

== Progeny ==
Progeny from Windsor Park include:

- Beauty Flash (Golan - Wychwood Rose): Hong Kong G1 winner
- Gold Onyx (Black Minnaloushe - Egoli Lass): winner at G1 level in South Africa
- Might And Power (Zabeel - Benediction): dual Australian horse of the year, winner of the 1997 Caulfield Cup & Melbourne Cup, 1998 Cox Plate
- Monaco Consol (High Chaparral - Argante): 2009 Victoria Derby winner
- Military Move (Volksraad - All Night Party): 2010 New Zealand Derby winner
- So You Think (High Chaparral - Triassic): winner of the 2009 & 2010 Cox Plate, 2011 Irish Champion Stakes

== See also ==
- Thoroughbred racing in New Zealand
- Cambridge Stud
- Trelawney Stud
