= Melody Belle =

New Zealand Thoroughbred racehorse

- Sire: Commands
- Grandsire: Danehill
- Dam: Meleka Belle
- Damsire: Iffraaj
- Sex: Mare
- Foaled: 26 September 2014
- Country: New Zealand
- Colour: Bay
- Breeder: NM Leicester
- Owner: Fortuna Melody Belle Syndicate
- Trainer: Jamie Richards
- Record: 38 : 19–1–6
- Earnings: NZ$4,224,049

Major wins
- Manawatu Sires Produce Stakes (2017); Tarzino Trophy (2018, 2019); Windsor Park Plate (2018, 2019, 2020); BCD Group Sprint (2019); Haunui Farm Classic (2019); Bonecrusher New Zealand Stakes (2019, 2021); Livamol Spring Classic (2019, 2020); Empire Rose Stakes (2019); Thorndon Mile (2021)

Awards
- New Zealand Champion Racehorse of the Year (2018/19 & 2019/20)

Melody Belle (foaled 26 September 2014) is a champion New Zealand Thoroughbred racehorse who is the only horse to win the New Zealand Triple Crown. She is also a two-time New Zealand Horse of the Year and holds the New Zealand record for the most Group 1 races won with 14, surpassing the previous New Zealand record of 13 set by the great mare Sunline and only one off the Australian record of 15 set by Black Caviar.

== Background ==
Melody Belle was bred at Haunui Farm in Karaka, New Zealand. She was bred by Haunui's longest standing client, Marie Leicester. Melody Belle is a member of the famous "Belle" family brought to the fore by Marie's parents, James and Annie Sarten.

Melody Belle was then sold for NZ$57,500 at the 2016 New Zealand Premier Yearling Sale.

== Racing career ==
Melody Belle was trained throughout her career by Jamie Richards, and ridden in the majority of her races by top Kiwi jockey Opie Bosson. She also had a close bond with her strapper Ashley Handley.

=== 2016/2017: Two-Year-Old Season ===
Melody Belle made a successful start to her racing career, winning her debut at Ruakaka Racecourse in October 2016 under jockey Cameron Lammas. In her next two races, she came third at Trentham Racecourse on 3 December under Cameron Lammas, then changed to jockey Michael McNab and came eighth at Ellerslie Racecourse on 14 January 2017.

Ridden by Opie Bosson for the first time, Melody Belle rebounded to win the prestigious Two-Year-Old Karaka Million at Ellerslie Racecourse on 29 January.

She missed the Group One Sistema Stakes because of injury, and was pointed to the Group 1 $225,000 Manawatu Sires Produce Stakes (1400m) at Awapuni Racecourse on 1 March. Ridden by Michael McNab again, she won the Manawatu Sires Produce which made her one of the top two-year-old fillies.

She went to Australia and trialed ahead of her next start, the Group 2 $250,000 Brisbane Sires Produce Stakes at Eagle Farm Racecourse on 27 May. She was ridden by Bosson and won by four lengths. Winning the Manawatu Sires Produce Stakes and the Brisbane Sires Produce was a rare feat for a New Zealand-trained horse, and she had won almost twenty times her $57,500 purchase price.

She finished her two-year-old season on 10 June with a tenth place in the J.J. Atkins Stakes at Doomben, where she was ridden by Damian Lane. Melody Belle was named Champion Two-Year-Old for the 2016/2017 season.

=== 2017/2018: Three-Year-Old Season ===
Melody Belle was spelled 182 days before her next start on 9 December 2017, now as a three-year-old. Ridden by Michael McNab, she came third in a handicap at Ellerslie Racecourse. She then came sixth in the Railway Stakes, a prestigious sprint at Ellerslie on 1 January 2018, ridden by Michael McNab.

She then ran in the Group 3 $70,000 Mongolian Khan Trophy, again at Ellerslie Racecourse, which she won by 3.5 lengths under Opie Bosson in her only win as a three-year-old.

She went to Randwick Racecourse in Australia for her final two starts of the season, a fifth-place finish in the Light Fingers Stakes on 17 February under Rory Hutchings, and a ninth-place finish in the Surround Stakes on 3 March under Hugh Bowman.

=== 2018/2019: Four-Year-Old Season ===
In her 4yo season, Melody Belle improved significantly, winning all three starts. In her first start on 18 August, Shafiq Rusof rode her to win the Group 2 $100,000 Foxbridge Plate (1200m) at Te Rapa Racecourse against a strong field. The victory gave trainer Jamie Richards his first win as the sole trainer for Te Akau Racing, and it was on his birthday.

Melody Belle then won the first two legs of the New Zealand Triple Crown, giving her back-to-back Group 1 wins. She was ridden by Shafiq Rusof in both races. The first victory was in the Group 1 $200,000 Tarzino Trophy (1400m) on 1 September, on the first day of the Hawkes Bay Racing Carnival at Hastings Racecourse. The second victory was in the Group 1 $200,000 Windsor Park Plate (1600m). The race is currently run as the Horlicks Plate. She did not attempt to win the final leg and become the first horse to win the New Zealand Triple Crown.

After a spell of 101 days, Melody Belle returned on 1 January 2019, coming third from the outside gate in the Group 1 Railway Stakes under Shafiq Rusof again. She then finished 16th in the prestigious Telegraph Handicap sprint under Jason Waddell after being the short-priced favorite.

Stepping up in distance, Melody Belle hit a run of form through the New Zealand summer. Firstly she earned her fourth Group 1 win in the $200,000 Waikato Sprint at Te Rapa in February under Troy Harris. Two weeks later on 23 February, she won the Group 1 $200,000 Haunui Classic (1600m) at Otaki Racecourse. Her jockey in the race, Opie Bosson, had now won every Group 1 race in New Zealand.

In her first race further than a mile, Melody Belle won the $200,000 Group 1 New Zealand Stakes (2000m), under Bosson again. She won against dual Group 1 winner Danzdanzdance after a battle down the homestretch. The victory was her fifth Group 1 of the season and her sixth Group 1 win in her career, surpassing Darci Brahma as Te Akau's horse with the Group 1 wins.

At the NZTR Horse of the Year Awards in September, Melody Belle was crowned the Champion Sprinter/Miler and the New Zealand Horse of the Year for the 2018/2019 season, receiving 59 of the available 61 votes.

=== 2019/2020: Five-Year-Old Season ===
Melody Belle was spelled 161 days and then kicked off the 2019/2020 season on 17 August with a fourth place in the Group 2 $100,000 Foxbridge Plate at Te Rapa Racecourse under Michael McNab.

She then returned to Hastings Racecourse in late August to race for the second time in the first leg of the New Zealand's Triple Crown, the Group 1 $200,000 Tarzino Trophy (1400m). She cruised to victory under Michael McNab. Three weeks later, Melody Belle returned in the second leg of the Triple Crown, the Group 1 Windsor Park Plate (1600m), for the second time. She won by nearly three lengths under Opie Bosson, tying with the two-time New Zealand Horse of the Year Mufhasa for the most Group 1 wins in New Zealand with eight.

Huge crowds gathered to watch the Livamol Spring Classic on 5 October, where Opie Bosson rode Melody Belle into the history books as she became the only horse to win the New Zealand's Triple Crown. By winning the Triple Crown, Melody Belle had won three Group 1 races in only five weeks. With the win, she also became the only horse to win 9 Group One races in New Zealand.

Keeping her brilliant win streak alive, Melody Belle returned under Opie Bosson to win the Group 1 $1,000,000 Empire Rose Stakes (1600m) at Flemington Racecourse in Australia on Australian Derby Day, 2 November. This was her first Group 1 win in Australia and her tenth Group 1 win overall. Melody Belle stayed in Melbourne and came second from gate 15 under Bosson in the Group 1 $2,000,000 Mackinnon Stakes on 9 November against star mare Magic Wand.

After a 105-day spell, Melody Belle returned to Australia for am autumn campaign. Her first race was the Group 1 Futurity Stakes (1400m) on 22 February, which she finished third under Bosson. She came third again with Bosson in the All Star Mile on 14 March. On 4 April, Bosson rode her again in the Doncaster Mile where they cane fourth over a very heavy track. Her autumn campaign concluded with a gritty fifth-place finish in the Queen Elizabeth Stakes at Royal Randwick on 4 April under Kerrin McEvoy.

Melody Belle was named 2019/2020 Champion Sprinter Miler and Champion Middle Distance Horse, as well as being crowned Horse of the Year for the second consecutive year.

=== 2020/2021: Six-Year-Old Season ===
Melody Belle was spelled 119 days and then came sixth in the Missile Stakes with Kerrin McEvoy on 8 August. On 22 August, she came 11th in the Group 1 Winx Stakes under Kerrin McEvoy, and then she returned to New Zealand.

Her first start back in New Zealand was the Group 1 Windsor Park Plate (1600m) on 3 October. She was ridden by Troy Harris and won by a nose over stablemate Avantage. This was the Te Akau's fourth consecutive Windsor Park Plate win, with Melody Belle's three wins coming after the win by Gingernuts in 2017.

On 17 October, Melody Belle ran in the Group 1 Livamol Spring Classic, where she tried to make it a seventh Group 1 win at Hastings in seven starts there. Under Troy Harris, Melody Belle achieved back-to-back wins in the Livamol Spring Classic, giving Te Akau five Livamol Classic wins and bringing her total Group 1 wins to 12.

She then came third in the Mackinnon Stakes on 7 November at Flemington Racecourse in Australia before coming back to New Zealand. She trialed on 12 January 2021 at Matamata ahead of her next start.

She won the Group 1 Thorndon Mile (1600m) on 30 January at Trentham Racecourse, equalling the record of 13 Group 1 wins set by Sunline. It was also her eighteenth career win. In February, Melody Belle disappointed in the Herbie Dyke Stakes at Te Rapa, where she was trying to become the all-time leader of Group 1 wins.

On 13 March, Melody Belle won the New Zealand Stakes at Ellerslie Racecourse on Auckland Cup day, defeating Avantage in a stretch battle to set an all-time record for most Group 1 wins by a New Zealand-trained horse with 14.

Melody Belle went to Australia for her final races and a broodmare career. She had muscle tie-up after her trackwork a few days before the Tancred Stakes, where stepping up to 2400m. She was passed fit to race by Racing New South Wales vets and finished sixth.

She then finished 10th to winner Zaaki in the Hollindale Stakes at Aquis Park. She had a bad barrier position and was checked halfway down the stretch. Melody Belle's final race was the Doomben Cup at Doomben Racecourse on 22 May, where she finished fifth to Zaaki.

She finished her career with a record of 41 races with 19 wins, 1 second-place finish, and 6 third-place finishes. She won 46% and placed in 63% of her races. Her wins came from 900m (around 0.5 miles) to 2040m (around 1 1/4 miles). Her earnings came to AUD$4,042,557.

== Breeding career ==
Upon her racing retirement, Melody Belle was sold for A$2.6 million at the Magic Millions National Broodmare Sale in May 2021. She was purchased by Yulong Investments and was sent to their sire Written Tycoon.

She had her first foal, a filly, in August 2022. This filly, Lyrics 'N' Song, had its first race on 3 October 2025 placing 2nd at Moonee Valley

The following year she was served by Diatonic, winner of the 2020 Hakodate Sprint Stakes and 2022 Hankyu Hai, Hanshin Cup and Swan Stakes.

== Pedigree ==
Pedigree of Melody Belle (NZ) 2014
Sire Commands (AUS) 1996	Danehill (USA); 1986	Danzig	Northern Dancer
Sire Commands (AUS) 1996	Danehill (USA); 1986	Danzig	Pas De Nom
Sire Commands (AUS) 1996	Danehill (USA); 1986	Razyana	His Majesty
Sire Commands (AUS) 1996	Danehill (USA); 1986	Razyana	Spring Adieu
Sire Commands (AUS) 1996	Cotehele House (GB); 1980	My Swanee	Petition
Sire Commands (AUS) 1996	Cotehele House (GB); 1980	My Swanee	Grey Rhythm
Sire Commands (AUS) 1996	Cotehele House (GB); 1980	Eight Carat	Pieces Of Eight
Sire Commands (AUS) 1996	Cotehele House (GB); 1980	Eight Carat	Klairessa
Dam Meleka Belle (NZ) 2009	Iffraaj (GB); 2001	Zafonic	Gone West
Dam Meleka Belle (NZ) 2009	Iffraaj (GB); 2001	Zafonic	Zaizafon
Dam Meleka Belle (NZ) 2009	Iffraaj (GB); 2001	Pastorale	Nureyev
Dam Meleka Belle (NZ) 2009	Iffraaj (GB); 2001	Pastorale	Park Appeal
Dam Meleka Belle (NZ) 2009	Empress Belle (NZ); 1987	Sir Tristram	Sir Ivor
Dam Meleka Belle (NZ) 2009	Empress Belle (NZ); 1987	Sir Tristram	Isolt
Dam Meleka Belle (NZ) 2009	Empress Belle (NZ); 1987	Imperial Belle	Sovereign Edition
Dam Meleka Belle (NZ) 2009	Empress Belle (NZ); 1987	Imperial Belle	Honey Belle

== See also ==
- Thoroughbred racing in New Zealand
