= Darci Brahma =

New Zealand-bred Thoroughbred racehorse

- Sire: Danehill
- Grandsire: Danzig
- Dam: Grand Echezeaux
- Damsire: Zabeel
- Sex: Colt
- Foaled: 21 September 2002 (age 24)
- Country: New Zealand
- Colour: Bay
- Breeder: Pencarrow Stud
- Trainer: Mark Walker
- Record: 19: 10-5-0

Major wins
- The T J Smith (2005); Hawke's Bay Guineas (2005); New Zealand 2000 Guineas (2005); Otaki-Maori Weight for Age (2005); Waikato Sprint (2007); Telegraph Handicap (2007)

Awards
- New Zealand Two Year Old of the Year (2004/5)

Darci Brahma (Danehill-Grand Echezeaux; foaled 21 September 2002) is a New Zealand thoroughbred colt foaled in 2002 at Pencarrow Stud near Cambridge in New Zealand. He was auctioned at the New Zealand Bloodstock Ltd Yearling Sales in January 2004 and acquired by a syndicate of ten investors for the sum of NZ$1.1 million.

== 2004–2005 season ==
Sent to trainer Mark Walker of Te Akau Racing Stables near Matamata for his early education, Darci Brahma quickly established a reputation as a potential star in the making winning his first race (January 2005) on debut, following that up with a strong win in the Listed Ford Fairview Slipper Stakes at Matamata in February and then running 2nd to Mi Jubilee in the Group One Ellerslie Sires Produce Stakes at Ellerslie in March.

Darci Brahma was sent to Australia in June 2005 where he contested two races at Eagle Farm, Brisbane, finishing a creditable 4th over 1400 metres in the Queensland Sire Produce Stakes and then winning the Group One T J Smith over 1600 metres producing a withering run from last on the turn to win by a length.

These performances were sufficient to see Darci Brahma awarded the New Zealand Two Year Old of the Year Award for the 2004–05 racing season

== 2005–2006 season ==
After being turned out for a well earned rest, Darci Brahma resumed racing as a Three Year old in the 2005–06 season when ridden by Michael Walker he downed Dr Green in the Group 2 Hawke's Bay Guineas over 1400 metres in an Australasian record time of 1:19.97, following this up with further wins in the Group 2 Wellington Guineas (1500 metres) in October and the Group One New Zealand 2000 Guineas (1600 metres) at Riccarton in November, winning this event by four lengths.

After a spell, Darci Brahma tackled the older horses for the first time in the Group One Waikato Sprint at Te Rapa in February 2006 where he was beaten into 2nd place by proven Weight For Age galloper Kristov. Three weeks later Darci Brahma turned the tables on Kristov by winning the Group One Otaki-Maori Weight for Age (1600 metres).

He then travelled to Australia where he finished a creditable 2nd to Apache Cat in the Group One Australian Guineas at Flemington, 4th in the Group 2 Phar Lap Stakes at Rosehill and at his first attempt over distance finished 8th in the Group One Rosehill Guineas (2000 metres) at Rosehill.

Brought back to New Zealand to ready him for racing as a four-year-old, Darci Brahma was awarded the title of Three Year Old of The Year Award at the Mercedes Thoroughbred Awards evening in September 2006.

== 2006–2007 season ==
Darci Brahma started his 4 year old career in the first two races of the Hawkes Bay Triple Crown, finishing second to eventual Horse Of The Year Seachange in both races. His only other start in that campaign was a sixth in the Toorak Handicap at Caulfield.

Resuming in the summer, Opie Bosson rode Darci Brahma won the Group 1 Telegraph Handicap at Trentham Racecourse followed by the Group 1 Waikato Sprint, giving the stallion a total of five Group 1 wins.

Days after his Waikato Draught Sprint win Darci Brahma injured himself in a workout and was announced retired.

== Stud career ==
Darci Brahma stood as a stallion at The Oaks stud in Cambridge for a stud fee of $15,000 and was a very successful sire. He retired from stud duties in 2023, having sired 13 individual Group 1 winners.

=== Notable progeny ===
c = colt, f = filly, g = gelding

Foaled	Name	Sex	Dam	Dam Sire	Major Wins
2008	Artistic	f	Artless (Aus)	Dahar (USA)	New Zealand Oaks (2022)
2008	Irish Fling	f	Irish Belle	O'Reilly	Telegraph Handicap (2014)
2008	Nashville	g	Royal Kiss (Ire)	Royal Academy (USA)	Haunui Farm Classic (2013, 2014)
2008	Super Easy	c	Parfore	Gold Brose (Aus)	Singapore Guineas (2012)
2009	Julinsky Prince	g	Julinsky Princess	Stravinsky (USA)	Windsor Park Plate (2015), Captain Cook Stakes (2015)
2010	Recite	f	Chant	Traditionally (USA)	Manawatu Sires Produce Stakes (2013), Levin Classic (2014)
2011	Gust Of Wind	f	Starrystarrynight (Ire)	Sadler's Wells (USA)	Australian Oaks (2015)
2012	D B Pin	g	Pins 'N' Needles	Pins	Centenary Sprint Cup (2018)
2012	Risqué	f	So Explicit	Straight Strike (USA)	New Zealand 1000 Guineas (2015)
2013	Devise	f	Doneze Girl	Volksraad (GB)	Haunui Farm Classic (2018)
2016	Catalyst	g	Evana	Entrepreneur (GB)	New Zealand 2000 Guineas (2019)
2016	Sierra Sue	f	Centree	Centaine (Aus)	Sir Rupert Clarke Stakes (2021), Futurity Stakes (MRC) (2022)
2017	Kahma Lass	f	Distinctive Lass (Aus)	Orientate (USA)	New Zealand 1000 Guineas (2020)

== See also ==
- Thoroughbred racing in New Zealand
