= Michael Walker (jockey) =

New Zealand jockey (born 1984)

Michael Walker (born 1984) is a New Zealand-born former jockey of Māori ancestry who won the New Zealand premiership and also competed in Australia, Hong Kong, and Singapore.

== Early life ==
Michael Walker was born in Rotorua, New Zealand, in the central districts of the North Island, although his family later moved to Waitara. At the age of 11, Walker approached noted Thoroughbred trainer Allan Sharrock, asking for work with his horses. Sharrock gave him regular work after school before eventually indenturing him as an apprentice. He arranged a special dispensation for Walker to start riding in races at age 15 instead of the usual starting age of 16.

In his first year as an apprentice (the 1999–2000 racing year), Walker had an astonishing 131 wins to not only win the apprentices’ championship but the jockeys’ premiership as well (his first of three). While apprenticed to Sharrock, Walker won 653 races, most in New Zealand (a record 631 wins), but also in Australia, Hong Kong, Malaysia, Japan, Singapore, and Macau.

== Senior jockey ==
In April 2004, at age 20, he became a fully fledged jockey. Walker celebrated the next day by riding five winners at the Woodville-Pahiatua Racing Club's meeting in southern Hawke's Bay. Despite not riding in New Zealand for three-quarters of the season, Walker finished with 107 wins, only seven behind Matamata jockey Leith Innes, who won the 2003–2004 premiership. However, he was awarded the apprentice of the year title for the season.

== Overseas move ==
Wanting to further his career, Walker announced in May 2004 that he was moving to Melbourne, Australia, following in the footsteps of other champion New Zealand jockeys, such as Midge Didham, Greg Childs, Brent Thomson, Shane Dye, and the Cassidy brothers, who made their names overseas.

Walker left with the blessing of Sharrock and the New Zealand racing fraternity. He made an immediate impression a few days after moving to Victoria, when he rode a 30-1 shot Monde Special to win the Warrnambool Cup. A couple of weeks later, he rode Chloe With Class to win at Moonee Valley to record his first metropolitan win, and followed that with a treble at Bendigo on 20 May 2004 on Lord Orb, Swift Rule, and Scopari.

His ride on Danestorm to win the Brisbane Cup in June 2004 was hailed by the media. However, he then went through a period of poor form, and wins were few and far between.

In 2005, Michael returned to New Zealand and became a stable rider for leading Matamata trainer Mark Walker. With that deal, the winning feeling returned, and in March 2006, he produced a perfectly timed ride on Pentane to win New Zealand's richest handicap, the Auckland Cup.

== Hunting accident ==
On 20 May 2008, Walker was seriously injured while pig hunting in Taranaki when he fell down a 10-metre-high bank. He was taken to Taranaki Base Hospital and then transferred to Auckland City Hospital with serious head injuries. He scored a win in only his second ride after his accident at Matamata on 4 December 2008.

== Injury and retirement ==
In August 2022, Michael Walker suffered a fall at a jumpout trial meeting at Pakenham, Victoria, and was hospitalised in intensive care and placed in an induced coma to stabilise him. This fall left Walker suffering from a brain injury, and in February 2023, he retired from raceday riding.

At the time of his retirement, it was reported that Walker had won 1144 races in New Zealand and more than 2000, including his victories in Australia, Hong Kong, and Singapore. This included 25 Group I races.

== Notable victories ==
The following are some of the major races Michael has won in New Zealand and Australia.

Year	Race	Horse	Trainer(s)
2020	The Thousand Guineas	Odeum	Mick Price & Michael Kent Jnr
2020	New Zealand Derby	Sherwood Forest	Tony Pike
2020	Blue Diamond Stakes	Tagaloa	Trent Busuttin & Natalie Young
2018	Queensland Guineas	Sambro	Chris Waller
2018	Australian Cup	Harlem	David & Ben Hayes & Tom Dabernig
2017	Caulfield Guineas	Mighty Boss	Mick Price
2015	Australian Cup	Spillway	David & Ben Hayes & Tom Dabernig
2014	New Zealand Derby	Puccini	Peter & Jacob McKay
2010	New Zealand Derby	Military Move	Shaune Ritchie
2008	Otaki-Maori Weight for Age	Alamosa	Peter McKay
2008	Wellington Cup	Young Centaur	John Sargent
2007	New Zealand 1000 Guineas	Insouciant	Mark Walker
2006	Auckland Cup	Pentane	Lance O'Sullivan
2006	Otaki-Maori Weight for Age	Darci Brahma	Mark Walker
2005	New Zealand 2000 Guineas	Darci Brahma	Mark Walker
2005	Hawke's Bay Guineas	Darci Brahma	Mark Walker
2004	Brisbane Cup	Danestorm	Jim Conlan
2003	New Zealand 1000 Guineas	Taatletail	Graeme Rogerson & Stephen Autridge
2003	Waikato Sprint	Tit for Taat	Anne Herbert
2003	Telegraph Handicap	Tit for Taat	Anne Herbert
2002	Hawke's Bay Guineas	Bunker	Stephen & Trevor McKee
2002	Ellerslie Sires Produce Stakes	Grout	Allan Sharrock
2002	Manawatu Sires Produce Stakes	Grout	Allan Sharrock
2001	Hawkesbury Gold Cup	Huge Demand	Graeme Rogerson
2001	Wellington Cup	Smiling Like	Graeme Rogerson

== See also ==
- Thoroughbred racing in New Zealand
- Thoroughbred racing in Australia
