= Zabeel Classic =

Horse race

- Class: Group I
- Location: Ellerslie Racecourse; Auckland, New Zealand
- Inaugurated: 1985
- Race type: Thoroughbred - Flat racing
- Sponsor: Cambridge Stud (2017 -)
- Website: Ellerslie Racecourse

Race information
- Distance: 2000m/2050m
- Surface: Turf
- Track: Right-handed
- Qualification: Open
- Weight: Weight-for-age
- Purse: NZ$500,000 (2025)

The Zabeel Classic is a Group One Thoroughbred horse race run at weight-for-age over a distance of 2000 metres at Ellerslie Racecourse in Auckland, New Zealand.

The Zabeel Classic is named in honour of Zabeel, son of Sir Tristram and four-time New Zealand champion sire. The race was formerly known as the:

- Television New Zealand Stakes (until 1991)
- Auckland Stakes (1992)
- Bluebird Foods Classic (1993)
- Auckland Classic (1994)
- Oaks Stud Classic
- Japan Racing Association Classic.

Up to 2005 the race was held in early January but it is now held on Boxing Day.

== List of winners ==
Year	Winner	Jockey	Trainer(s)	Time	Second	Third
2025	Kingswood 59	Rory Hutchings	Gavin Bedggood, Cranbourne, Aust.	2:06.40 (soft)	Jaarffi 57	Legarto 57
2024	Snazzytavi 57	Warren Kennedy	Graham Richardson & Rogan Norvall	2:04.04 (soft)	La Crique 57	El Vencedor 59
2023 (Pukekohe)	Campionessa 57	Opie Bosson	Mark Walker & Sam Bergerson	2:07.90 (soft, 2050m)	No Compromise 59	Aquacade 57
2022 (Pukekohe)	Defibrillate 59	Warren Kennedy	Graham Richardson & Rogan Norvall	2:05.37 (good, 2050m)	Prise De Fer 59	Polly Grey 57
2021	Tiptronic 59	Ashvin Goindasamy	Graham Richardson & Rogan Norvall	2:05.15 (dead)	Vernanme 59	Two Illicit 57
2020	Concert Hall 57	Vincent Colgan	Roger James & Robert Wellwood	2:01.93 (dead)	Supera 57	In A Twinkling 59
2019	True Enough 59	James McDonald	Murray Baker & Andrew Forsman	2:01.24 (good)	Fiscal Fantasy 57	Beauden 59
2018	Danzdanzdance 56.5	Opie Bosson	Chris Gibbs & Michelle Bradley	2.08.18 (heavy)	Lizzie L’Amour 57	Jon Snow 59
2017	Authentic Paddy 59	Trudy Thornton	Lisa Latta, Awapuni	2.06.31 (dead)	Lizzie L’Amour 57	Volkstok’n’barrell 59
2016	Consensus 57	Alysha Collett	Stephen McKee	2.01.25 (good)	Volkstok’n’barrell 59	Authentic Paddy 59
2015	Kawi 59	Leith Innes	Allan Sharrock	2.04.30 (good)	Stolen Dance 56.5	Authentic Paddy 59
2014	Soriano 57	Rory Hutchings	Graeme & Debbie Rogerson	2.02.30 (good)	Weregoingtogetcha 58.5	Ponderosa Miss 56.5
2013	Historian 59	Matthew Cameron	Gary Alton	2:05.99 (dead)	O’Fille 57	Soriano 56.5
2012	Veyron 59	Rogan Norvall	Linda Laing	2:08.19 (dead)	Shez Sinsational 57	Shootoff 59
2011	Shez Sinsational 56.5	James McDonald	Allan Sharrock	2:02.34 (good)	Veyron 59	Doctor Freemantle 59
2010	Booming 59	Vincent Colgan	Jeff Lynds	2:04.02 (good)	Red Ruler 59	Ginga Dude 59
2009	Vosne Romanee 59	Matthew Cameron	Jeff Lynds	2:00.60 (good)	Red Ruler 59	Tell A Tale 58.5
2008	Gallions Reach 59	Sam Spratt	Richard Yuill	2:05.69 (dead)	Willy Smith 59	Overkaast
2007	Sir Slick 59	Bruce Herd	Graeme Nicholson	2:03.81 (dead)	Xcellent 59	Dezigna 59
2006	Mikki Street 59	Bruce Herd	Lisa Latta	2:02.84 (good)	Sharvasti 56	Fiscal Madness 59
2005 (Dec)	Bazelle 56	Jason Waddell	Paul Jenkins	2:03.72 (dead)	Kind Return 56	Focal Point 56
2005 (Jan)	St Reims 58.5	Leith Innes	Chris McNab	2:03.33 (good)	Distinctly Secret 58.5	Lashed 57
2004	Lashed 55.5	Opie Bosson	Graeme Rogerson & Stephen Autridge	2:02.62 (good)	Penny Gem 55.5	El Duce 58.5
2003	Hail 58.5	Greg Childs	Bruce & Stephen Marsh	2:04.52 (good)	Miss Potential 58	Doyle 56
2002	Giovana 57	Peter Johnson	Carol Marshall	2:02.88 (good)	La Bella Dama 55.5	Hill Of Grace 57
2001	Zonda 58.5	Damien Oliver	Roger James	2:05.81 (dead)	Giovana 58	Cronus 55
2000	Rebel 58.5	Linda Ballantyne	Val Langsford	2:04.11 (good)	Aerosmith 58	Integrate 58
1999	Del Coronado 58.5	Paul Taylor	Colin Jillings & Richard Yuill	2:01.24 (good)	All In Fun 58	Greenstone Charm 58
1998	Vialli 58.5	Shane Dye	Dave & Paul O'Sullivan	2:04.49 (good)	Bubble 58	Gypsy Soul 56
1997	Captain Moonlight 52.25	Darren Beadman	Stephen Autridge	2:05.97 (firm)	Vialli 58.5	Pakaraka Star 58.5
1995	Star Dancer 57	G L Cooksley	B J Wallace	2:05.50 (firm)	Ball Park 58.5	Lord Majestic 58.5
1994	All In Fun 57	Jim Collett	T J McDonald	2:04.76 (firm)	The Phantom 58.5	Shatin Heights 51
1993	Staring 55.5	Noel Harris	Murray Baker	2:03.08 (firm)	Perlia Bay 49.5	On The Beach 57
1992	Seamist 56.5	Tony Allan	J F Parsons	2:01.70 (firm)	Lurestina 56.5	Cool Reception 57
1991	Ray's Hope 57	Lisa Cropp	K P Verner	2:10.16 (heavy)	Mickey's Town 58	Brown Jumper 58
1990 (Apr)	Horlicks 57	Lance O'Sullivan	Dave & Paul O'Sullivan	2:11.12 (heavy)	Mickey's Town 57	Mr Brooker 58
1989 (Apr)	Trissaring 57	David Peake		2:03.65 (good)	Sirstaci 57	Bonecrusher 58
1988 (Apr)	Horlicks 56	Noel Harris	Dave & Paul O'Sullivan	2:03.72 (good)	Bonecrusher 58	Sounds Like Fun 56
1987 (Apr)	Field Dancer 57	M Coleman	Jim Gibbs & Roger James	2:01.97 (good)	Greatness 58	Cool Deal 56
1986 (Apr)	Waverley Star 53.5	Lance O'Sullivan	Dave & Paul O'Sullivan	1:59.99 (good)	Solveig 56	Santanea 57

+ The race was moved from January to December in 2005.

== Ellerslie Boxing day meeting ==
On this day, as well as the Zabeel Classic, Ellerslie holds 9 other races including:

- the Westbury Stud Royal Descent Stakes - 1400m for fillies and mares - $90,000 (2024).
- the Dunstan Horsefeeds Stayers Championship Final - 2400m special conditions $125,000 (2024)
- the Auckland Guineas - Group 2, 1400m for 3YO horses - $270,000 (2024)
- the Stella Artois 1500 Championship Final - special conditions $110,000 (2024).
- the Eight Carat Classic - Group 2, 1600m 3YO fillies set weight $270,000 (2024).

All 10 races at the 2024 meeting had stakes of $80,000 or more.

== See also ==
- Auckland Cup
- Bonecrusher New Zealand Stakes
- New Zealand International/Herbie Dyke Stakes
- New Zealand Derby
- Captain Cook Stakes
- Thorndon Mile
- Thoroughbred racing in New Zealand
