= Graeme Rogerson =

New Zealand racehorse trainer

Graeme Rogerson MNZM
Personal information
- Born: New Zealand
- Occupation: Racehorse trainer

Horse racing career
- Sport: Horse racing

Racing awards
- New Zealand Racing Hall of Fame

Significant horses
- Efficient, Katie Lee, Polar Success, Savabeel, Sharp 'N' Smart

Graeme Arthur Rogerson MNZM is a New Zealand Thoroughbred racehorse trainer. He is notable for having trained more race-day winners than any other trainer in New Zealand and for having won many Group One races in New Zealand and Australia.

== Biography ==
Rogerson was raised in Te Rapa. Before training he tried his hand at amateur riding. He originally trained horses at Cambridge before moving to Tuhikaramea Road in the 1970s. For a time he has trained in successful partnerships with Stephen Autridge and Keith Hawtin. Rogerson was the youngest New Zealand trainer to get to 1,000 winners.

Rogerson branched out and established stables and partnerships in Australia and Dubai.

Graeme's wife, Debbie, joined him in a training partnership and his granddaughter, Bailey, later joined the partnership which was called Team Rogerson

In the 2004 Queen's Birthday Honours, Rogerson was appointed a Member of the New Zealand Order of Merit (MNZM), for services to the thoroughbred industry.

In 2012 Rogerson was inducted into the New Zealand Racing Hall of Fame and at that time he had trained well over 3,500 winners and won the New Zealand trainers premiership twelve times.

== Notable horses and victories ==
Rogerson has trained or co-trained a large number of high-class horses, including:

- Batavian: winner of the 1996 Hawke's Bay Guineas and 1998 Mudgway Stakes
- Beauden: winner of the 2021 Awapuni Gold Cup
- Blanchard: winner of the 2002 Trentham Stakes
- Costume: winner of the 2014 New Zealand International Stakes and Spring Classic
- Efficient: winner of the 2006 Victoria Derby, the 2007 Melbourne Cup and the 2009 Turnbull Stakes
- Gallic: winner of the 2007 Adelaide Cup, Sydney Cup and Moonee Valley Cup
- He's No Pie Eater: winner of the 2007 Rosehill Guineas
- Huge Demand: winner of the 2000 and 2001 Hawkesbury Gold Cup
- Just A Dancer: winner of the 1991 Sydney Cup and Brisbane Cup
- Kaaptive Edition: winner of the 1993 H E Tancred Stakes
- Katie Lee: winner of the 2009 New Zealand 1000 Guineas and New Zealand 2000 Guineas
- Keeninsky: winner of the 2004 Manawatu Sires Produce Stakes and 2005 Telegraph Handicap
- Lashed: winner of the 2004 New Zealand Stakes, New Zealand International Stakes and Zabeel Classic
- Mascarpone, winner of the 2022 Otaki-Maori Weight for Age
- Polar Success: winner of the 2003 Golden Slipper Stakes
- Prince Of War: winner of the 2002 Tulloch Stakes
- Savabeel: winner of the 2004 Spring Champion Stakes and Cox Plate
- Savannah Success: winner of the 1999 New Zealand Oaks
- Scarlett Lady: winner of the 2011 Manawatu Breeders Stakes, Doomben Roses and Queensland Oaks and the 2012 New Zealand Stakes
- Sharp 'N' Smart: winner of the 2022 Gloaming Stakes and Spring Champion Stakes and 2023 Herbie Dyke Stakes and New Zealand Derby
- Skating: winner of the 1993 Doncaster Handicap
- Skoozi Please: winner of the 2000 J J Liston Stakes and Carlyon Cup
- Smiling Like: winner of the 2000 New Zealand Cup, 2001 Trentham Stakes and Wellington Cup
- Soriano: winner of the 2014 Zabeel Classic and Awapuni Gold Cup and the 2015 New Zealand International Stakes
- Taatletail: winner of the 2003 New Zealand 1000 Guineas
- Teddy Doon: winner of the 1978 Manawatu Sires Produce Stakes and New Zealand 2000 Guineas
- Vegas: winner of the 1998 Telegraph Handicap.

== Harness racing ==
Rogerson has also been a registered harness racing trainer since 2008 and has trained in partnerships with:

- Peter Simpson (2008–2009).
- Steven Reid (2009–2011).
- Peter Blanchard (2012–2015).
- Dylan Ferguson (2021–2022).

== See also ==
- Murray Baker
- Opie Bosson
- Roger James
- Trevor McKee
- Mike Moroney
- Dave O'Sullivan
- Lance O'Sullivan
- Jamie Richards
- Chris Waller
- Thoroughbred racing in New Zealand
- Harness racing in New Zealand
