= Mark Walker (horse trainer) =

New Zealand horse trainer

Personal information
- Occupation: Horse trainer

Horse racing career
- Sport: Horse racing

Mark Walker is a leading thoroughbred horse racing trainer in New Zealand and Australia and previously in Singapore. He has won the trainer's premiership eight times in New Zealand plus four times in Singapore.

== Early life ==
Walker grew up on a dairy farm in Rahotu. He joined the Opunake Pony Club and competed in show-jumping and eventing.

== Te Akau Racing ==
After leaving school, Walker joined Te Akau Racing and worked his way up to be the head trainer.

Walker won the New Zealand trainers premiership for the first time in the 2003/04 season when he was 31 years old, the youngest to ever do so. This record was later beaten by his Te Akau replacement, Jamie Richards, as a 30 year old. Between the 2003/04 and 2009/10 seasons Walker won the New Zealand premiership five times:

- 2003/04 - 76 wins
- 2005/06
- 2006/07
- 2008/09
- 2009/10

He was 3rd in the 2004/05 season with 62 wins behind Graeme Rogerson & Stephen Autridge (83 wins) and Michael Pitman (68 wins). In the 2007/08 season he was 2nd with 84 wins behind Michael Pitman (86 wins) with Mike & Paul Moroney 3rd on 73 wins.

In 2010, Walker departed New Zealand to set up Te Akau's racing stables at Kranji racecourse in Singapore. While he was there he won the Singapore premiership four times:

- 2015
- 2017 - a record 87 wins
- 2019
- 2021.

In 2022, Walker returned to Te Akau's New Zealand operation to replace Jamie Richards, who had moved to Hong Kong. In the 2022/23 season Mark Walker won the New Zealand trainers premiership again with 203 winners including 33 Group and listed races.

Walker set up a Te Akau stable at Cranbourne in Melbourne. Australia.

With commitments either side of the Tasman, Mark was joined in partnership by Sam Bergerson in the 2023. The partnership went on to win the premiership in the following seasons:

- 2023/24 - 169 wins, including 21 group and listed races. 2nd was Stephen Marsh on 100 wins with Lisa Latta 3rd on 66.
- 2024/25 - 131 wins, including 18 group and listed races. 2nd was Stephen Marsh on 104 wins with Lance O'Sullivan & Andrew Scott 3rd on 82.
- 2025/26- 135 wins, including 19 group and listed races. 2nd was Stephen Marsh on 102 wins with Lisa Latta 3rd on 61 wins.

Mark Walker recorded his 1000th New Zealand win in 2022. In September 2024, Walker achieved another notable milestone when Age of Discovery won the Rangiora New World Guineas Trial (1400m) at Riccarton. The win was victory number 2000 for Walker in his career, made up up of 1279 wins in New Zealand, 684 in Singapore and 37 in Australia.

== Notable horses ==
Notable horses Walker has trained or co-trained include:

- Bellatrix Star: winner of the 2024 Schillaci Stakes, runner up in the 2024 Coolmore Stud Stakes
- Belle Cheval: winner of the 2026 Vinery Stud Stakes
- Campionessa: winner of the 2023 Zabeel Classic and the 2024 Peter Young Stakes
- Captured by Love: Winner of the 2024 New Zealand 1000 Guineas
- Darci Brahma
- Distinctly Secret: winner of the 2002 Grand Prix Stakes and Rough Habit Plate, the 2003 Kelt Capital Stakes and the Awapuni Gold Cup in 2004 and 2005. He was also 3rd in the 2003 Caulfield Cup.
- Elite Invincible: winner of the 2018 Patrons Bowl and Singapore Gold Cup
- Geegees Mistruth: winner of the 2026 Robert Sangster Stakes
- Imperatriz
- Kings Chapel: winner of the 2003 New Zealand 2000 Guineas, 2004 Telegraph Handicap and Otaki-Maori Weight for Age
- La Dorada: winner of the 2025 Manawatu Sires Produce Stakes
- Lara Antipova: winner of the 2026 Sistema Stakes
- Maroofity: winner of Walker's first Group 1, the 2003 Ellerslie Sires Produce Stakes and Manawatu Sires Produce Stakes and the 2005 Thorndon Mile
- Maven Belle: winner of the 2022 Manawatu Sires Produce Stakes
- Move to Strike: winner of the 2024 Manawatu Sires Produce Stakes, sire
- Princess Coup
- Quintessa: winner of the 2024 Levin Classic and 2025 Proisir Plate
- Return to Conquer: unbeaten winner of the 2025 Sistema Stakes, sire
- Skew Wiff: winner of the 2023 Tarzino Trophy
- Tell A Tale: winner of the 2008 New Zealand 2000 Guineas

== See also ==
- Murray Baker
- Opie Bosson
- Roger James
- Graeme Rogerson
- Lance O'Sullivan
- Chris Waller
- Thoroughbred racing in New Zealand
