= Jamie Richards (horse trainer) =

New Zealand horse trainer

Personal information
- Occupation: Horse trainer

Horse racing career
- Sport: Horse racing

Jamie Richards is a leading thoroughbred horse racing trainer in New Zealand and Hong Kong.

== Early career ==
Jamie's father, Paul Richards, was an accomplished jockey and his mother, Leanne Richards was a racing administrator.

Jamie was also an amateur jockey, winning 5 races in 10 starts.

Jamie attended Otago Boys' High School and then Otago University, he achieved a Bachelor of Commerce in Management and Accounting and a Diploma in Marketing. He was selected for the Sunline International Management Scholarship to undertake stud and stable experience in Europe and the United States.

He later worked for New Zealand Bloodstock before moving to Matamata to work at Waikato Stud.

== Te Akau Racing ==
Jamie entered into a formal training partnership at Te Akau Racing with Stephen Autridge in May 2015. He took over as sole trainer in July 2018.

Jamie has won the New Zealand Trainers Premiership:

- 2015/16 season in partnership with Steven Autridge.
- 2019/20 season – 160 wins (36 Group or listed races) for stakes of $5,969,645 (in New Zealand alone).
- 2020/21 season – 101 wins (17 Group or listed) for $3,825,283. This season was affected by COVID-19.
- 2021/22 season – 117 wins (28 Group or Listed) for $6,146,137.

=== Hong Kong ===
On 17 December 2021, it was announced by The Hong Kong Jockey Club that Jamie Richards was granted a trainer licence in Hong Kong with effect from start of the 2022/23 Hong Kong Racing Season. He was replaced at Matamata by Mark Walker who previously headed Te Akau Racing's operation in Kranji, Singapore.

Jamie had his first winner, Handsome Rebel, at Happy Valley in Hong Kong on 12 October 2022.

== Notable horses ==
Notable horses he has trained or co-trained include:

- Age of Fire: winner of the 2018 Levin Classic.
- Amarelinha: winner of the 2021 New Zealand Oaks.
- Avantage, winner of 9 Group 1 races.
- Belle En Rouge: winner of the 2022 New Zealand Oaks.
- Cool Aza Beel, winner of the 2020 Sistema Stakes.
- Embellish, winner of the 2017 New Zealand 2000 Guineas.
- Gingernuts, winner of the 2017 Avondale Guineas, New Zealand Derby, Rosehill Guineas & Windsor Park Plate.
- Kahma Lass, winner of the 2020 New Zealand 1000 Guineas.
- Melody Belle, winner of the 2019 Empire Rose Stakes.
- Noverre, winner of the 2021 New Zealand 2000 Guineas.
- On The Bubbles, winner of the 2021 Karaka Million for 2 year olds.
- Probabeel
- Risque, winner of the 2015 New Zealand 1000 Guineas.
- Sword of Osman, winner of the 2018 Sistema Stakes.
- Sword of State, winner of the 2021 Sistema Stakes.
- Te Akau Shark, winner of the 2020 BCD Group Sprint and Chipping Norton Stakes.
- The Perfect Pink, winner of the 2021 New Zealand 1000 Guineas.
- Xtravagant: winner of the 2015 New Zealand 2000 Guineas.
- Yourdeel, winner of the 2019 Sistema Stakes.

== See also ==
- Murray Baker
- Opie Bosson
- Roger James
- Graeme Rogerson
- Lance O'Sullivan
- Chris Waller
- Thoroughbred racing in New Zealand
