= Frances (disambiguation) =

Frances is a given name, the feminine version of Francis.

Frances may also refer to:

== Places ==
- Frances, Indiana, an unincorporated community
- Frances, Kentucky, an unincorporated community
- Frances, Washington, an unincorporated community
- Frances, South Australia, a town

== Ships ==
- Frances (ship), several ships
- USS Frances, two ships of the United States Navy

== Other uses ==
- Frances (horse), a New Zealand racehorse
- Frances (film), a 1982 film starring Jessica Lange as actress Frances Farmer
- Hurricane Frances (disambiguation), various cyclones
- Frances, the Allied code name for the Japanese Yokosuka P1Y bomber of the Second World War
- Frances (musician) (born 1993), English singer and songwriter
- Frances (1811 cricketer), first name unknown
- Camino francés, or the French Way, a popular camino pilgrimage route in Spain

== See also ==
- Francesca, another form of name "Frances"
- Francesco, Francis, Franciscus, Frank, male forms of name "Frances"
- Francese, an Italian surname
