= Listed buildings in Kettlebaston =

Civil Parish in Suffolk, England

Kettlebaston is a village and civil parish in the Babergh District of Suffolk, England. It contains 14 listed buildings that are recorded in the National Heritage List for England. Of these one is grade I and 13 are grade II.

This list is based on the information retrieved online from Historic England.

== Key ==
Grade	Criteria
I	Buildings that are of exceptional interest
II*	Particularly important buildings of more than special interest
II	Buildings that are of special interest

== Listing ==
Name	Grade	Location	Type	Completed (Note: The date given is the date used by Historic England as significant for the initial building or that of an important part in the structure's description.)	Date designated	Grid ref. (Note: The grid reference is based on the British national grid reference system, sometimes known as OSGB36, used by the Ordnance Survey.) Geo-coordinates	Notes	Entry number (Note: The "List Entry Number" is a unique number assigned to each listed building and scheduled monument by Historic England.)	Image	Wikidata
Bramble Cottage	II				10 July 1980	TL9662250328; 52°06′59″N 0°52′13″E		1037213	Upload Photo	Q26288910
Chapel Farmhouse	II				23 January 1958	TL9767849856; 52°06′42″N 0°53′08″E		1285550	Upload Photo	Q26574237
Chestnut Cottage	II				10 July 1980	TL9662750354; 52°07′00″N 0°52′14″E		1037212	Upload Photo	Q26288908
Church Farmhouse	II				10 July 1980	TL9665750277; 52°06′57″N 0°52′15″E		1351489	Upload Photo	Q26634589
Church of St Mary	I		church building		23 January 1958	TL9657850287; 52°06′57″N 0°52′11″E		1037253	Church of St Mary More images	Q17541904
Clay Cottage	II				10 July 1980	TL9660150362; 52°07′00″N 0°52′12″E		1351511	Upload Photo	Q26634609
Evans Corner	II				10 July 1980	TL9633250137; 52°06′53″N 0°51′58″E		1037214	Upload Photo	Q26288912
High House Farmhouse	II				23 January 1958	TL9591451003; 52°07′21″N 0°51′37″E		1351512	Upload Photo	Q26634610
K6 Telephone Kiosk Opposite Bramble Cottage	II				14 February 1989	TL9664050320; 52°06′58″N 0°52′14″E		1275936	Upload Photo	Q26565487
Kettlebaston Hall	II				10 July 1980	TL9648350295; 52°06′58″N 0°52′06″E		1180469	Upload Photo	Q26475716
The Croft	II				26 August 1977	TL9665450336; 52°06′59″N 0°52′15″E		1285451	Upload Photo	Q26574144
The Old Convent	II				10 July 1980	TL9663050391; 52°07′01″N 0°52′14″E		1180482	Upload Photo	Q26475732
Wagger Farmhouse	II				10 July 1980	TL9670948958; 52°06′14″N 0°52′15″E		1037215	Upload Photo	Q26288913
Kettle Cottage	II	Ipswich			10 July 1980	TL9665050355; 52°07′00″N 0°52′15″E		1037254	Upload Photo	Q26288950

== See also ==
- Grade I listed buildings in Suffolk
- Grade II* listed buildings in Suffolk

== Sources ==
- Bettely, James; Pevsner, Nikolaus (2015) [1961], Suffolk: West, The Buildings of England, New Haven and London: Yale University Press, ISBN 978-0-300-19655-9
