= Thomas Sherwood (settler) =

Deputy to the General Court of the Colony of Connecticut from Stratford
- In office 1650–1650
- In office 1653–1654

Personal details
- Born: 1586 England
- Died: 1655 (aged 68–69) Stratford, Connecticut
- Occupation: Military Service

Military service
- Battles/wars: Pequot War

Thomas Sherwood (1586 – 1655) was an early settler of the Connecticut Colony and a deputy to the General Court of Connecticut from Stratford in the mid-17th century. He is considered one of the founding settlers of Fairfield County, Connecticut.

== Early life and emigration ==
Thomas Sherwood was born in 1586, in England, possibly in Kettlebaston, Suffolk, though the exact place of birth is uncertain. He married Alice Tiler, and together they had several children. He emigrated from England to the Massachusetts Bay Colony in 1634 in on the Frances ship during the Great Migration of Puritans. By 1640, he had settled in Fairfield, Connecticut, and later moved to Stratford. Alice Tiler died circa 1640 and after that Sherwood married a woman named Mary.

== Career in Connecticut ==
Sherwood fought in the Pequot War from 1636-1638.

Sherwood became an active figure in colonial affairs. He was chosen as a deputy to the General Court of Connecticut from Stratford in 1650, 1653, and 1654. The General Court served as the legislative body of the colony, and deputies played an important role in the creation of early laws and the management of colonial governance.

In addition to his service at the colonial level, Sherwood held various local responsibilities and was a landowner of some prominence. Records from the mid-17th century show his involvement in the civic and religious life of the communities where he lived.

== Death and legacy ==
Sherwood wrote his last will and testament on 21 July 1655, naming his children from both marriages. The inventory of his estate was taken on 7 September 1655, and the will was proved on 22 October 1655, confirming his death occurred between late July and early September of that year.

Although the exact location of his grave is unknown, Thomas Sherwood is honored with a cenotaph at the Old Burying Ground in Fairfield, Connecticut, alongside his two wives. The memorial marks his contributions to the founding and governance of the town and colony.

=== Children of Thomas Sherwood and Alice Tiler ===
- Jane Sherwood (1611–1685)
- Mary Sherwood (1613–after 1655)
- Thomasine Sherwood (1615–after 1655)
- Sarah Sherwood (1617–after 1655)
- Anna Sherwood (1619–after 1655)
- Rose Sherwood (1620–after 1699)
- Rebecca Sherwood (1622–after 1655)
- Thomas Sherwood Jr. (1624–1698)

=== Children of Thomas and Mary Sherwood ===
- Stephen Sherwood (1638–1701)
- Mary Sherwood (1640–1681)
- Ruth Sherwood (1642–1699)
- Matthew Sherwood (1644–1715)
- Abigail Sherwood (1649– 1691)
- Isaac Sherwood (1651–1733)
