= John Riordan (jockey) =

New Zealand jockey (1936–2021)

Personal information
- Full name: John Peter Riordan
- Born: 1935 or 1936 New Plymouth, New Zealand
- Died: 10 August 2021 (aged 85) Brisbane, Queensland, Australia
- Occupation: Jockey

Horse racing career
- Sport: Horse racing

Major racing wins
- Easter Handicap (1959); Auckland Cup (1960, 1972); W. S. Cox Plate (1963); Manawatu Sires Produce Stakes (1967, 1975); New Zealand Derby (1972)

John Peter Riordan (1936 – 10 August 2021) was a New Zealand jockey in Thoroughbred horse racing.

== Biography ==
Born in New Plymouth, Riordan was the son of Dennis and Agnes Riordan. He began his five-year jockey apprenticeship with Te Awamutu trainer Jack MacDonald when he was 11 years old, and rode his first winner at the age of 14.

Riordan won the 1963 W. S. Cox Plate aboard Summer Regent. He rode the same horse as favourite in the 1963 Melbourne Cup, but finished third last. Other major races won by Riordan included the Auckland Cup in 1972, and the Wellington Cup.

Riordan lived in Brisbane, Australia, for the last 20 years of his life, and died there on 10 August 2021. He was survived by his wife, Pam.
