= Frances (ship) =

A number of sailing ships have been named Frances:

- Frances (1803 ship) (or Francis) was built in India or the East Indies circa 1795, possibly under another name, and entered British records in 1803. Between 1803 and 1807 she made three voyages as a slave ship in the triangular trade in enslaved persons. After the end of British participation in the slave trade in 1807, Frances started trading with Spain and the West Indies. She was wrecked in January 1809.
- Frances, a 368-ton (bm) whaler built in 1824.
- Frances, a schooner wrecked in 1837.
- Frances (1839), a cutter built in 1839, that was wrecked in 1840 upon Neptune Island, South Australia.
- Frances, a 332-ton sailing ship, that transported passengers from Liverpool to Melbourne in 1841.
- Frances (1859 convict ship), a sailing ship that carried one convict to Western Australia from Madras in 1859.

== See also ==
- USS Frances
