= Advance (horse) =

New Zealand Thoroughbred racehorse

- Sire: Vanguard (NZ)
- Grandsire: Traducer (GB)
- Dam: Laurel
- Damsire: Young Gownsman
- Sex: Stallion
- Foaled: 1896
- Country: New Zealand
- Colour: Black
- Breeder: Donald Fraser
- Trainer: Joe Prosser
- Record: 19W 4P 1S
- Earnings: ?

Advance was a thoroughbred race horse who won 19 races in New Zealand and Australia.

He was a front-running colt who won over distances up to 1-1/2 miles. Known as "The Black Demon", he was a superior weight-carrier, in his 19 wins he carried more than 9 stone in 13 of them—and some rank him as a better horse than Carbine.

He was foaled in 1896, at Parawanui in the Rangitikei district of the North Island by Donald Fraser, he was leased to J.W. Abbott and J.D. Duncan, who raced under the name "Douglas Gordon and J. Monk," and trained by Joe Prosser and ridden by Charlie Jenkins. He won his only two races as a juvenile, and at age three won ten races, seven of them in a row.

== Breeding ==
His dam, Laurel, a chestnut with a flaxen mane and tail, won twenty races for Fraser in a long career, interrupted when she was nine to produce her first foal, and then put back into racing. Her daughter Lorelei (1891, by Cruiser) won the Manawatu Cup (12 furlongs), and other races. Laurel was in-bred to Riddlesworth (1837, by Emilius - Bee-in-a-Bonnet, imported 1843; also sire of Sybil, Family C - 20 ) whose blood was favored by Fraser).

== Age 3 ==
- 1900 AJC Autumn Stakes,
- 1900 Wanganui Cup,
- 1900 Wanganui Stakes,
- 1900 Dunedin Cup,
- 1900 Auckland Easter Handicap
- 1900 Century Stakes,
- 1900 Autumn Handicap,

== Age 4 ==
Advance had a number of New Zealand wins:

- 1901 Wanganui Stakes
- 1901 The Canterbury Cup
- 1901 CJC Jubilee Cup
- 1901 Auckland Plate

After this Advance and the owners went to Australia, where they picked up two seconds and a third, and won:

- 1901 Sydney's Autumn Stakes,
- 1901 All Aged Stakes

== Later career ==
He had a bout of influenza which affected his breathing and he was sidelined at age five but in 1903 he came back to win the:

- 1903 Wellington Cup
- 1903 WRC Zealandia Handicap
- Wanganui Jackson Stakes.

He was also second in the Wanganui Cup.

== Stud record ==
Retired to Fraser's stud he sired nothing like himself; his best was the sprinting filly Equitas (Family C - 20), winner of the CJC Stewards' Handicap and other good races, and later dam of the 1919 Wellington Cup and 1920 New Zealand Cup winner Oratress.

== See also ==
- Thoroughbred racing in New Zealand
