= Auckland Cup Week =

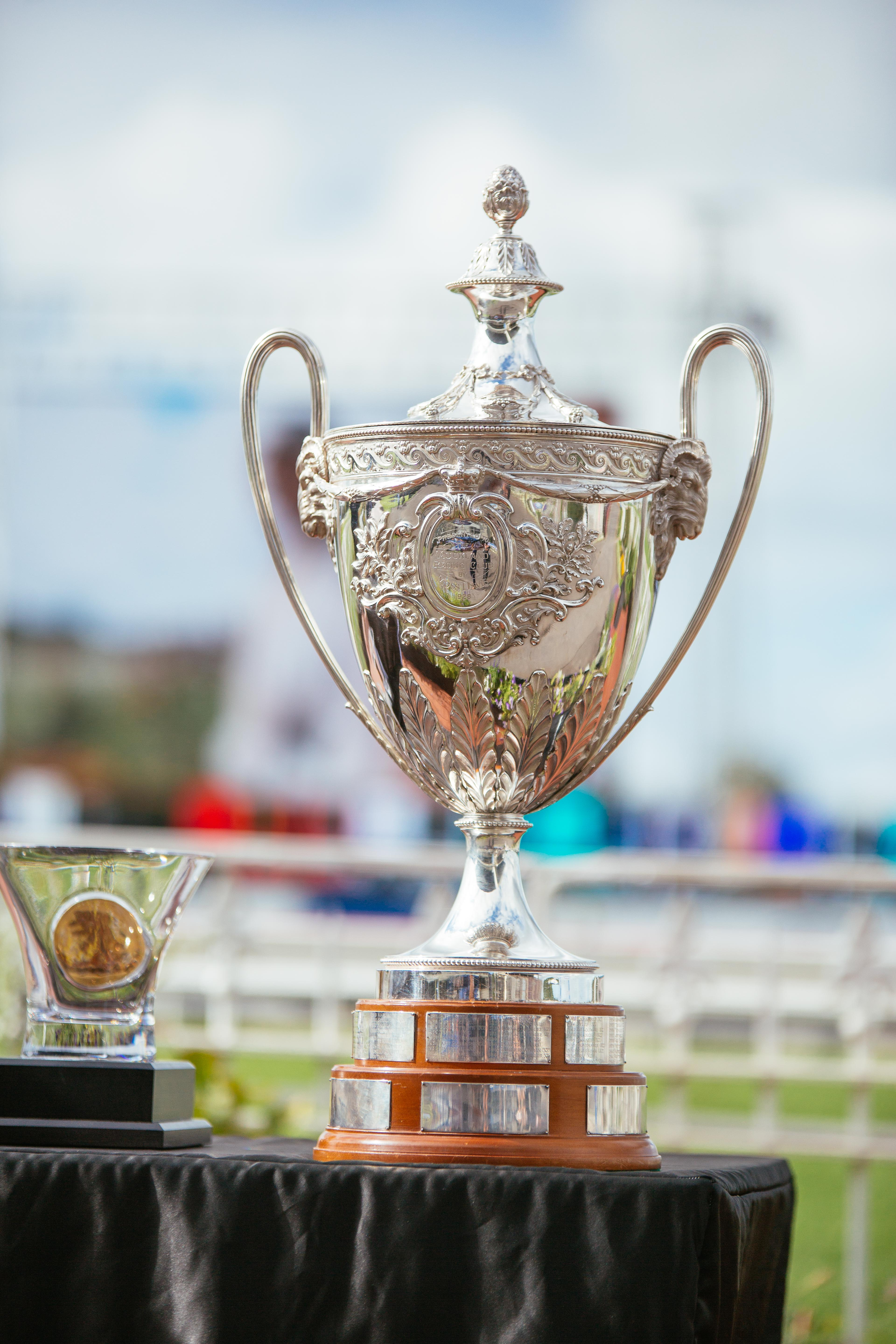
The Barfoot & Thompson Auckland Cup trophy which Auckland Cup Week is named after. This trophy was gifted to the Auckland Racing Club by Moss Davis in the 1930s after he purchased it at a Christie's auction in London. The priceless trophy was commissioned by Queen Victoria in the 1880s and made by her personal jeweller, House of Garrard.

Auckland Cup Week is one of New Zealand's major annual thoroughbred racing carnivals and is the country's richest offering stakes. Held in Auckland in early March, the carnival comprises two days of racing and entertainment at Ellerslie Racecourse - Vodafone Derby Day and Barfoot & Thompson Auckland Cup Day.

The carnival was first run in 2006.

Auckland Cup Week's feature races are:

- Group 1 New Zealand Derby, over 2400m for 3 year old thoroughbreds
- Group 1 Group I Bonecrusher New Zealand Stakes, at Weight-for-age over 2000m
- Group 1 Group I Sistema Stakes, over 1200m for 2 year olds
- Group 2 Barfoot & Thompson Auckland Cup, an open handicap over 3200m
- Group 3 Haunui Farm Kings Plate, an open race over 1200m
- Group 3 McKee Family Sunline Vase, over 2100m for 3 year old fillies
- Group 3 Mufhasa Stakes, over 1400m for 3 year olds
- Rangitoto Classic, a special condition race over 1500m

In addition, Auckland Cup Week plays host to additional off-track entertainment including New Zealand's national fashions in the field final, The Ned Prix de Fashion, which will see its winner take home not only the national title, but a trip to Australia to compete in Victoria Racing Club's MYER Fashions on the Field competition as part of the Melbourne Cup Carnival.

The dates for Auckland Cup Week 2021 were Saturday 6 March (Vodafone Derby Day) and Saturday 13 March (Barfoot & Thompson Auckland Cup Day).

== See also ==
- Thoroughbred racing in New Zealand
