= Cuddle (horse) =

New Zealand-bred Thoroughbred racehorse

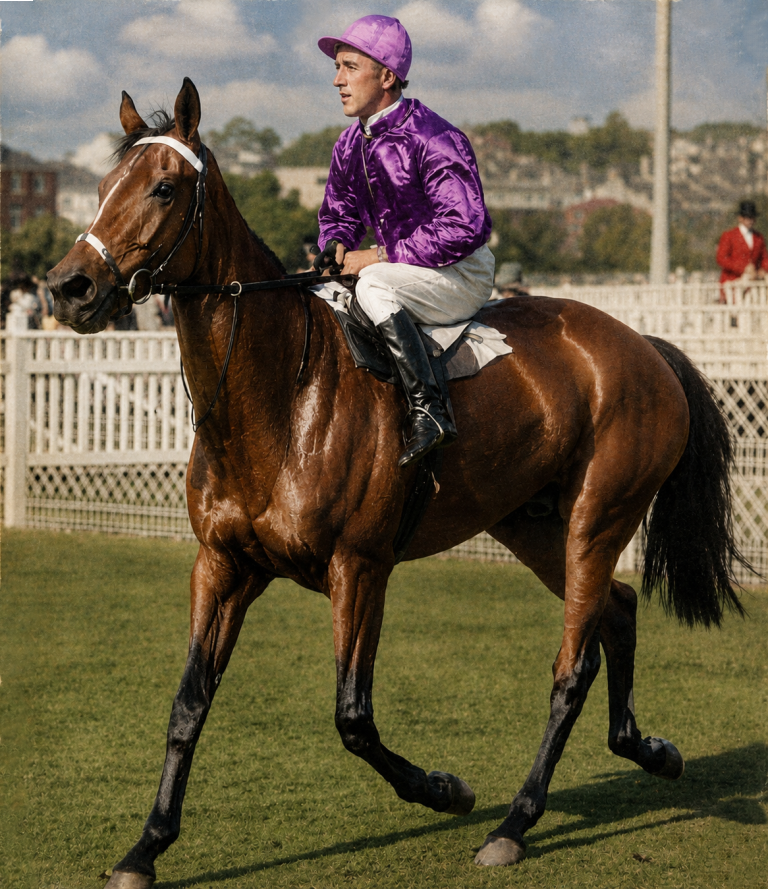
- Cuddle and Maurice McCarten; Randwick Racecourse
- Sire: Psychology (GB)
- Grandsire: Tracery (USA)
- Dam: Caress (NZ)
- Damsire: Martian (NZ)
- Sex: Mare
- Foaled: 1929
- Country: New Zealand
- Colour: Bay
- Owner: C J Stowe, Hastings (first 16 races) then R J Murphy, Wellington
- Trainer: C J Stowe, Hastings (first 16 races)
- Record: 66: 23–14–5
- Earnings: $24,264

Major wins
- New Zealand Cup (1935); Auckland Cup (1935,1936); All Aged Stakes (1936); Doncaster Handicap (1936); St George Stakes (1936)

Honours
- New Zealand Racing Hall of Fame; Cuddle Stakes
- Last updated on 17 November 2010

Cuddle was an outstanding New Zealand Thoroughbred racemare that won a large number of major races including the 1935 and 1936 Auckland Cups in race record time. She went to Australia in 1936, where she won a number of races including the Doncaster Handicap.

Cuddle was a filly foaled in 1929 by the good racehorse and sire, Psychology (GB) out of the place-getter, Caress (NZ) by the leading sire, Martian.

Her regular rider in New Zealand was Jim Ellis. When she went to Australia she was ridden by expatriate New Zealanders Keith Voitre and Maurice McCarten.

== Principal race wins ==
- 1935 Auckland Cup, ridden by Jim Ellis.
- 1935 ARC King's Plate
- 1935 New Zealand Cup, Jim Ellis.
- 1935 WRC Summer Handicap
- 1936 All Aged Stakes, Maurice McCarten
- 1936 Doncaster Handicap (carrying 58 kg, a record for a mare until Sunline achieved it, and only two horses have carried more weight since, Super Impose (59) and Gunsynd with 60.5), Maurice McCarten.
- 1936 Auckland Cup, Jim Ellis.
- 1936, 1937 ARC Clifford Plate
- 1936 ARC King's Plate
- 1936 St George Stakes, Keith Voitre.
- 1937 CJC Canterbury Cup

== Progeny ==
Cuddle was the dam of eight foals for seven starters and six winners, including:

- Beau Cheval, winner of the 1947 Adelaide Cup
- Gamble, winner of the 1944 Timaru Cup (dead-heated with Honest Sal).

== Cuddle Stakes ==
She has the “Cuddle Stakes” named after her, a race for fillies and mares run at Trentham Racecourse.

== See also ==
- Thoroughbred racing in New Zealand
- Thoroughbred racing in Australia
