= Bill Skelton (jockey) =

New Zealand jockey

Bill Skelton MBE
Personal information
- Full name: William David Skelton
- Born: 4 September 1931 Cobden, New Zealand
- Died: 25 November 2016 (aged 85) Palmerston North, New Zealand
- Occupation: Jockey

Horse racing career
- Sport: Horse racing
- Career wins: 2,179

Major racing wins
- New Zealand Cup (1959, 1968); Auckland Cup (1965); Railway Handicap (1966); Wellington Cup (1968); Easter Handicap (1968); Ellerslie Sires Produce Stakes (1969); The Thousand Guineas (1969); Caulfield Stakes (1969); Cox Plate (1969); VRC Derby (1969); New Zealand Derby (1971); Manawatu Sires Produce Stakes (1974); WRC George Adams Handicap (1975); New Zealand Stakes (1976)

Honours
- New Zealand Sports Hall of Fame (1990); New Zealand Racing Hall of Fame (2006)

William David Skelton MBE (4 September 1931 – 25 November 2016) was a top jockey in New Zealand Thoroughbred horse racing who competed from the 1940s for four decades. He also rode in Australia, South Africa, Japan, Singapore, Malaysia and Hong Kong.

== Early life and family ==
Born in the Greymouth suburb of Cobden on 4 September 1931, Skelton was the son of William George Skelton and Gwendoline Emma Skelton (née Baker). In 1955 he married Italian-born Emanuela Valeria Macchi, and they went on to have three children, including David, who was a jockey in both Australia and New Zealand.

Bill Skelton's brother, Bob, was also a successful jockey as were his other brothers, Frank, Max, and Errol, although the latter was more noted as a top trainer for many years.

== Racing career ==
Skelton started as an apprentice jockey aged 13, and rode his first winner (a dead heat) aged 15 at Wingatui.

He was the leading apprentice in New Zealand for four consecutive years, and champion jockey seven times, and was outside the top four of the premiership between 1947 and 1979 only four times. He rode a record 124 winners in the 1967–68 season, and in May 1980 became the first New Zealand jockey to ride 2000 winners; he finished with 2179. He remains the most successful jockey of the 20th century in New Zealand with those figures.

According to Skelton, the best horse he rode was Daryl's Joy, champion New Zealand two-year-old in 1968, champion three-year-old in Australia in 1969, and later successful in the United States. Skelton won both the W. S. Cox Plate and the Victoria Derby on Daryl's Joy in Australia.

The big two-mile victories in New Zealand included the Auckland Cup on Lucky Son, which he also trained; his father-in-law Fred Pratt's mare Foglia D'Oro in the New Zealand Cup; and Loofah and Noir Filou in the Wellington Cup.

== Honours and awards ==
In the 1980 Queen's Birthday Honours, Skelton was appointed a Member of the Order of the British Empire, for services to horse racing as a jockey. He was inducted into the New Zealand Sports Hall of Fame in 1990, and to the New Zealand Racing Hall of Fame in 2006.

== Later life and death ==
Skelton suffered a stroke in 1994, which restricted his movement and speech. He died in Palmerston North on 25 November 2016, aged 85.

== See also ==
- Thoroughbred racing in New Zealand
