= Patrick Murdoch =

Patrick Murdoch (died 1774) was a writer, publisher and mathematician, who published a biography of poet James Thomson, and also An account of Sir Isaac Newton's philosophical discoveries by Colin MacLaurin.

== Life ==
He was a native of Dumfries, and was educated at the university of Edinburgh, where he distinguished himself in mathematics, and was the pupil and friend of Colin Maclaurin. In 1729, he was appointed tutor to John Forbes, only son of Lord-president Duncan Forbes of Culloden, and visited with him Orleans, Montauban, Rome, and other continental cities. Forbes subsequently paid Murdoch long and frequent visits at Stradishall rectory, Suffolk, and placed his eldest son, Duncan, under his tuition. Murdoch was likewise travelling tutor to the younger sons of James Vernon, ambassador to the court of Denmark. He was presented by James Vernon to the rectory of Stradishall in 1738, when his friend, James Thomson, addressed to him some pleasing lines.

On 20 March 1745, he was elected F.R.S., and in 1748 was admitted M.A. at Cambridge per literas reyias.

William Leman gave him the rectory of Kettlebaston, Suffolk, in 1749, which he resigned in 1760 on being presented by Edward Vernon to the vicarage of Great Thurlow; but he still continued to reside at Stradishall. In 1756, he accompanied his friend Andrew Mitchell (1695?–1771), to Berlin, where he remained until 1757, conducting part of the correspondence, while Mitchell and his secretary, Burnet, were with the army. Shortly after his return home he received the degree of D.D., presumably from the university of Edinburgh.

Murdoch died in October 1774 in St. Clement Danes, London.

He appears to have been amiable and simple-hearted, and a good scholar. Though he speaks of his engagement to a lady whom he met in Paris in 1742, he died a bachelor. His library was sold in 1776.

== Works ==
Murdoch, having written the 68th stanza in canto i. of Thomson's Castle of Indolence, in which he portrayed the poet, Thomson gave the next stanza as descriptive of Murdoch, referring to him as 'a little, round, fat, oily man of God.' Murdoch also wrote a short but clear and lively memoir of Thomson prefixed to the memorial edition of the poet's Works, 2 vols. 4to, 1762, and to nearly all the later editions of The Seasons.

To Colin Maclaurin's Account of Sir Isaac Newton's Philosophical Discoveries, 4to, London, 1748, which he saw through the press for the benefit of the author's children, he prefixed an account of his life. Another edition was issued in 1750, 8vo. He also edited the illustrations of perspective from conic sections, entitled Neutoni Genesis Curvarum per Umbras, &c., 8vo, London, 1746. He contemplated a complete edition of Newton's works, and by 1766 had found a publisher in Andrew Millar, but increasing infirmities obliged him to abandon the undertaking. Murdoch was a longtime friend to both Millar and Andrew Mitchell.

Murdoch was author of Mercator's Sailing, applied to the true Figure of the Earth; with an Introduction, &c., 4to, London, 1741. To the Philosophical Transactions he communicated eight papers, two of which Trigonometry abridged, 1758, and On Geographical Maps, 1758, exist in the original manuscript among the Additional manuscripts in the British Library (Add MS 4440, arts. 564 and 565). He translated from the German the portion of Anton Friedrich Buesching's New System of Geography, which relates to the European states, 6 vols. 4to, London, 1762, and prefixed three explanatory essays.

Murdoch's letters to Dr. Thomas Birch, 1756-9, are in British Library Add MS 4315; those to Sir Andrew Mitchell, 1756–70, are contained in Add MS 6840; while twelve letters by him are printed in the Culloden Papers: comprising an Extensive and Interesting Correspondence from the Year 1625 to 1748, London: T. Cadell & W. Davies, 1815. His letterbook, when acting for Mitchell at Berlin, 1756-7, is Add MS 6841 (cf. Add MSS 6805, fol. 48 and 6839, fol. 105).

== Sources ==
Du Toit, Alexander (2004). "Murdoch, Patrick (d. 1774)". Oxford Dictionary of National Biography. Oxford University Press.
