= Great Sensation =

New Zealand-bred Thoroughbred racehorse

- Sire: Cassock
- Grandsire: Casanova
- Dam: Speedy
- Damsire: Irish Lancer
- Sex: Gelding
- Foaled: 1952
- Country: New Zealand
- Colour: Brown
- Breeder: Not found
- Owner: Mick Brown
- Trainer: Mick Brown
- Record: 69: 20-11-9
- Earnings: $78,916

Major wins
- James Hazlett Gold Cup (1959); Invercargill Gold Cup (1960); Canterbury Gold Cup (1960); Trentham Stakes (1960, 1962); Dunedin Cup (1961, 1962); Wellington Cup (1961, 1962, 1963)
- Last updated on December 4, 2007

Great Sensation (foaled 1952) was a champion New Zealand bred thoroughbred stayer. He was sired by Cassock and out of the mare, Speedy. Great Sensation began his racing career in 1956 at Wingatui Racecourse in Dunedin.

Nicknamed Cracker, he was ridden by Bob Skelton, who rated him as the best stayer he had even ridden.

Great Sensation won a number of important New Zealand races but is best remembered for his winning three consecutive Wellington Cups from 1961 through 1963. In winning his first Cup in 1961, Great Sensation posted an Australasian record time of 3:17.50 for two miles.

== See also ==
- Thoroughbred racing in New Zealand
- Repeat winners of horse races
