= Auckland Cup =

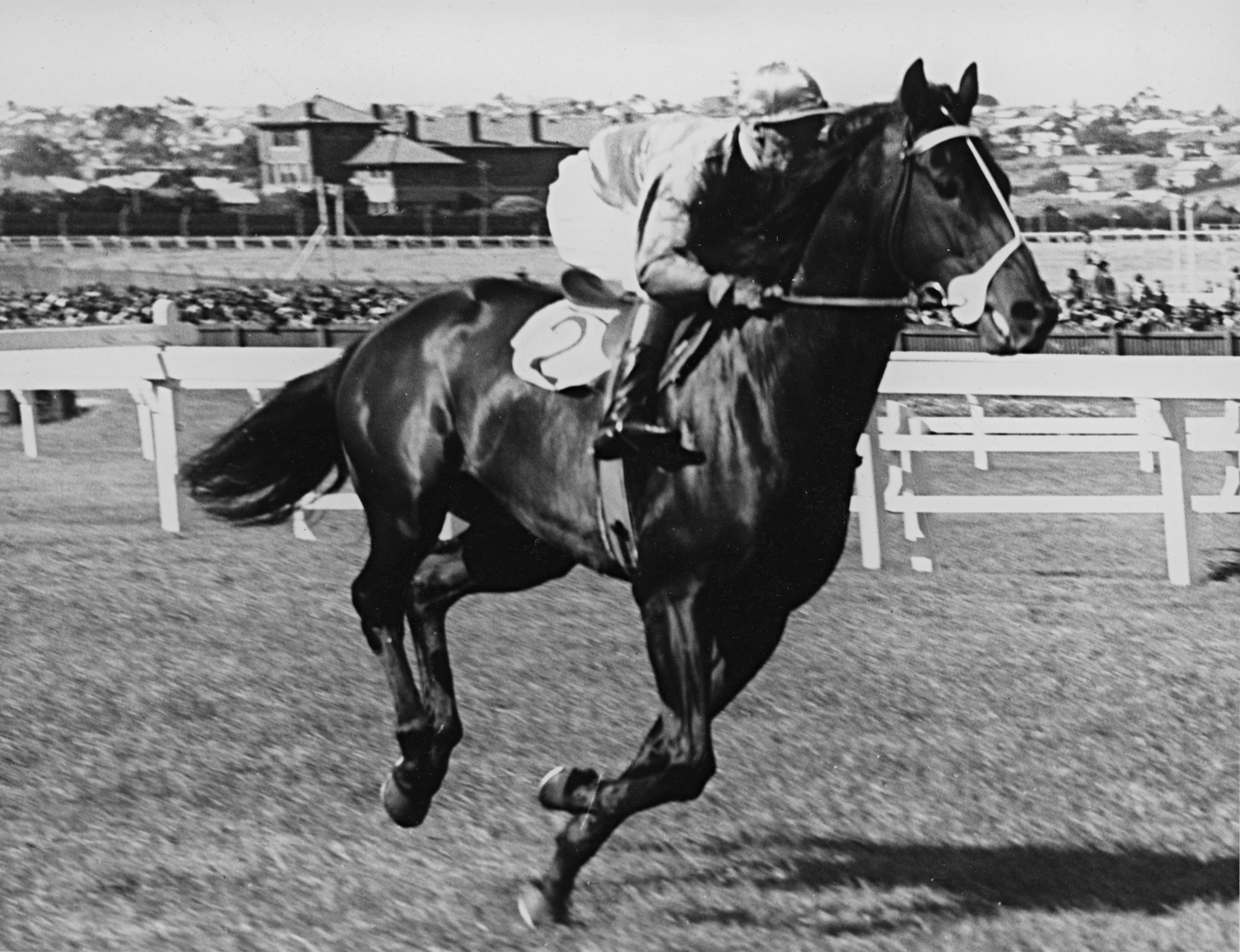
- Beau Vite, 1940 winner
- Class: Group III
- Location: Ellerslie Racecourse; Auckland, New Zealand
- Inaugurated: 1874
- Race type: Thoroughbred – Flat racing
- Website: www.ellerslie.co.nz

Race information
- Distance: 3200m (2 miles)
- Surface: Turf
- Track: right-handed
- Qualification: Three-year-olds and up
- Weight: Set weights plus penalties

The Auckland Cup is an annual race held by the Auckland Racing Club (ARC). It is an Open Handicap for thoroughbred racehorses competed on the flat turf over 3200 metres (two miles) at Ellerslie Racecourse in Auckland, New Zealand.

The race was formerly graded as a Group One (G1) event but as from 2022 is a Group 2. And downgraded again in 2027 to Group 3.

It was first contested in 1874.

== History ==
The first meeting of the Auckland Racing Club was in May 1874. One of the events, run over a distance of 1 1/2 miles, was named the Auckland Cup. This race was won by Mr. J Watt's three-year-old Batter. At the Summer Meeting of 1874 the Auckland Cup was run on Boxing Day over a distance of two miles and in subsequent published records of the club this race is shown as being the first official, recognised Auckland Cup contest.

This race was won by Templeton, a horse which later inspired Thomas Bracken to write the requiem Old Templeton. The day was reviewed positively in the 28 December issue of the New Zealand Herald, and was found to be absent of ‘sheanannaking’ and ‘hanky-panky’ and that everything was ‘above-board’ and ‘up hill and down straight’.

In 1898 W H Bartlett filmed Uhlan winning the Auckland Cup at Ellerslie Racecourse for the entrepreneur Alfred Henry Whitehouse. This was the first time a horse-race had been filmed in New Zealand.

== Scheduling ==
The race was run on Boxing Day from in its inception until 1958 and from then until 2006 it was on New Year's Day.

Since 2006, the race has been contested on the second Saturday of Auckland Cup Week at the beginning of March on the same race day as the New Zealand Stakes and the Sistema Stakes (Ellerslie Sires Produce Stakes). From 2025 onwards, it was part of Champions Day, alongside the Group One New Zealand Derby, Group One Sistema Stakes, Group One New Zealand Thoroughbred Breeders Stakes, Group One New Zealand Stakes and the $3.5 million NZB Kiwi.

For many years the Auckland Cup was the richest horse race in New Zealand. However, it has been surpassed in recent years by the New Zealand Derby and Karaka Million two year old and three year old races.

== Notable winners ==
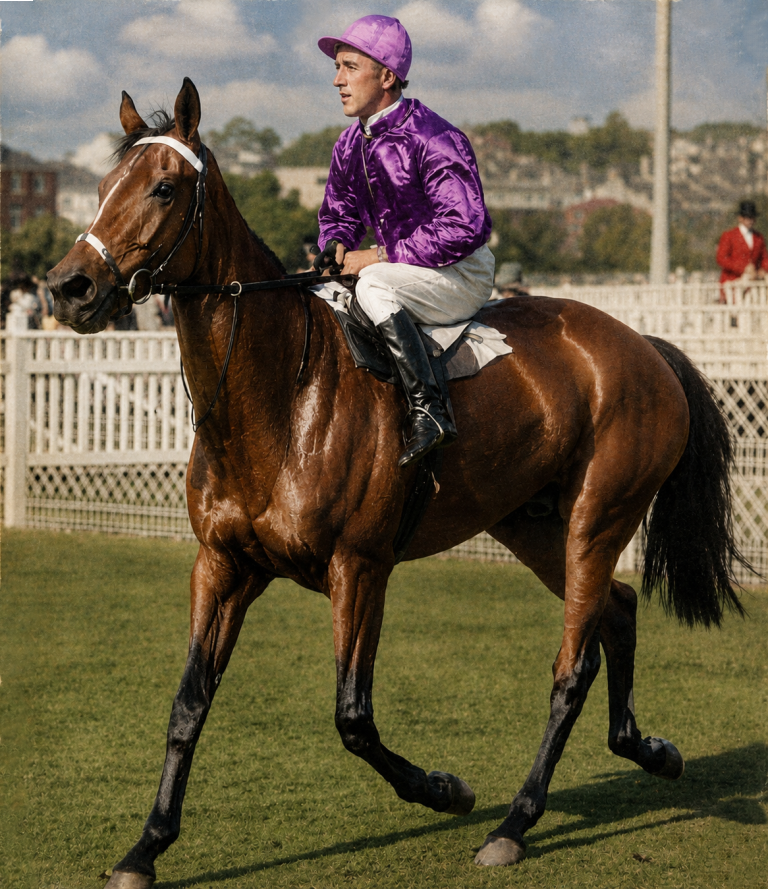
Cuddle, 1935 and 1936 winner

The Auckland Cup has been won by such notable horses as:

- Beau Vite (1940) who won the 1940 and 1941 Cox Plate.
- Beaumaris (1950).
- Castletown (1992) who also won the Wellington Cup three times.
- Cuddle (1935 and 1936) who also won the Doncaster Handicap and All Aged Stakes.
- Il Tempo (1969 and 1970) who also won the Wellington Cup in world record time of 3:16.2 for the two miles.
- Jezabeel (1998) who also won the 1998 Melbourne Cup.
- Kindergarten (1942) who was one of five inaugural inductees into the New Zealand Racing Hall of Fame.
- Nelson (1885–87), an Australian champion who greeted the judge at the head of the field three times.

=== Auckland Cup and Avondale Cup double ===
In recent years the following Auckland Cup winners have also won the Avondale Cup:

- Glory Days: 2019
- El Soldado: 2016 Auckland Cup and 2017 Avondale Cup
- Who Shot Thebarman: 2014
- Sangster: 2013
- Spin Around: 2009 Auckland Cup and 2007 Avondale and Counties Cups

== Race results since 1958 ==
| Year | Winner | Wgt | Age | Sire | Dam | Jockey | Trainer(s) | Owner(s) | Time | Second place | Third place |
|---|---|---|---|---|---|---|---|---|---|---|---|
| 2026 | Paradise Storm | 53 | 5g | Masked Marvel (GB) | Holystorm (Fr) | Joe Doyle | Henry Dwyer, Australia | OTI Racing & Henry Dwyer Racing | 3:25.89 (soft) | Manzor Blue 53 | Age Of Sail 54 |
| 2025 | Trav | 53 | 5g | Almanzor (FRA) | Royal Sav | Masa Hashizume | Raymond Connors, Bulls | Mrs E, M S & R M Connors | 3:28.36 (soft) | Tajanis 53 | Interpretation 59 |
| 2024 | Mahrajaan | 54.8 | 6g | Kitten’s Joy (USA) | Lahudood (GB) | Sam Weatherley | Shaune Ritchie & Colm Murray | G I Barnett, G W Bates, R Cooper, P J Cranitch, G M Jennings, G G Peterson, Shaune Ritchie, C J Talbot, E J Wood & Est late S F Massey | 3:24.38 (good) | Good Oil 52 | Mark Twain 52 |
| 2023 | Platinum Invador | 55 | 7g | Redwood | Atomic Dancer | Ryan Elliott | Lisa Latta, Awapuni | Lincoln Farms Bloodstock Ltd & N J McAlister | 3:25.39 (soft) | Nerve Not Verve 55 | Ladies Man 56 |
| 2022 | Uareastar | 53 | 5m | Jakkalberry | Enchanteress | Wiremu Pinn | Fraser Auret, Marton | C & K Faiers, Mrs D, D F & S B Hurley, M J & R J Kuklinski, Mrs B R & J Murdoch, D B Northcott, Mrs M P O'Brien, B N Williams & H G Wilson | 3:24.15 (good) | Concert Hall 56 | Sound 58 |
| 2021 | Ocean Billy | 56 | 5g | Ocean Park (NZ) | Cool Storm (NZ) | Johnathan Parkes | Bill Pomare, Rotorua | Bill & Suzi Pomare & Peter Ludgate | 3:21.00 (good) | Charles Road 55 | Sound 57 |
| 2020 | Roger That | 55 | 7g | Shinko King (IRE) | Heather Lyn (NZ) | Samantha Collett | Antony Fuller, Tauranga | PG Allan, SB Cunningham, Mrs SH Fuller & C Squires | 3:19.96 (good) | Sound 55 | Platinum Invador 56 |
| 2019 | Glory Days | 53.5 | 6m | Red Giant (USA) | Bilancia (NZ) | Samantha Collett | Bill Thurlow, Waverley | G D & P A Thurlow, B J & S A McAree | 3:32.00 (heavy) | Five to Midnight 56 | Blue Breeze 55 |
| 2018 | Ladies First | 54 | 5m | Dylan Thomas (IRE) | Just Polite (AUS) | Johnathan Parkes | Allan Sharrock, New Plymouth | FJ & HT O'Leary | 3:22.17 | Five To Midnight 56.5 | Wildflower 53.5 |
| 2017 | Chenille | 53.5 | 5m | Pentire (GB) | Charmed (NZ) | Leith Innes | Tony Pike, Cambridge | V T W Breeding Company Ltd, G & J Capes | 3:22.90 | El Pistola 53 | Jacksstar 56 |
| 2016 | El Soldado | 55 | 9g | Colombia (NZ) | Zo'Al (NZ) | Darryl Bradley | Phillip Devcich, Cambridge | Phillip Devcich, B & C Higginson | 3:21.70 | Rose Of Virginia 53 | Sacred Master 55 |
| 2015 | Rock Diva | 52 | 4m | Lucky Unicorn (AUS) | Bohemian Blues (NZ) | Mark Du Plessis | Tony Pike, Cambridge | Raffles Racing | 3:21.74 | King Kamada 53 | Pondarosa Miss 55.5 |
| 2014 | Who Shot Thebarman | 52.5 | 5g | Yamanin Vital (NZ) | Ears Carol (NZ) | Matt Cameron | Mark Oulaghan, Awapuni | O'Leary Brothers | 3:25.28 | Celtic Prince 52.8 | More Than Sacred 52 |
| 2013 | Sangster | 54.5 | 4g | Savabeel (AUS) | Quinta Special (IRE) | Opie Bosson | Trent Busuttin & Natalie Young, Cambridge | M Bradley, M Fenwick, K Greenlees et al. | 3:23.23 | El Soldado 52.5 | Chaparrone 52 |
| 2012 | Shez Sinsational | 55 | 4m | Ekraar (USA) | Original Sin (NZ) | James McDonald | Allan Sharrock, New Plymouth | A Baeyertz, J Goodin, G MacDonald et al. | 3:25.35 | Spiro 57.5 | Six O’Clock News 59 |
| 2011 | Titch | 54.5 | 6g | Lord Ballina (AUS) | Our Sophie (NZ) | Opie Bosson | Kevin Myers, Whanganui | J N Wallace | 3:17.02 | Showcause 53 | Castle Heights 52 |
| 2010 | Zavite | 57.5 | 7h | Zabeel (NZ) | Miss Vita (USA) | Damien Oliver | Anthony Cummings, Randwick | N Falconer et al. | 3:18.96 | Booming 51 | Tin Goose 51 |
| 2009 | Spin Around | 55.5 | 8g | Spinning World (USA) | Be Yourself (USA) | Vinnie Colgan | Steven Cooper, Ardmore | Brookby Stables | 3:23.61 | Mr Tipsy 52 | Mandela 57.5 |
| 2008 | Prize Lady | 52.5 | 6m | Prized (USA) | Pen Bal Lady (GB) | Mark Sweeney | Graeme Sanders & Debbie Sweeney, Te Awamutu | J C Wallis | 3:35.09 | Gallions Reach 53 | Resolution 52 |
| 2007 | Prize Lady | 52 | 5m | Prized (USA) | Pen Bal Lady (GB) | Mark Du Plessis | Graeme Sanders & Debbie Sweeney, Te Awamutu | J C Wallis | 3:23.63 | Pentane 56.5 | Luckshan 53 |
| 2006 | Pentane | 53 | 4g | Pentire (GB) | Tuff One (NZ) | Michael Walker | Lance O'Sullivan, Matamata | M G & P A Fraher | 3:21.52 | Zabeat 54.5 | Zarius 53 |
| 2005 | Bazelle | 52 | 5m | Zabeel (NZ) | Show Games (AUS) | Mark Du Plessis | Paul Jenkins, Matamata | M Glennan, B Hewitt et al. | 3:29.45 | Bondy 53.5 | Zabeat 53.5 |
| 2004 | Upsetthym | 51 | 5m | Rhythm (USA) | Set Up (NZ) | Gemma Sliz | Karen Fursdon, Matamata | Pepsi Syndicate | 3:23.61 | Galway Lass 52.5 | My Governess 53 |
| 2003 | Bodie | 52.5 | 5g | Stark South (USA) | Ballina Wave (NZ) | Noel Harris | Neil Connors, Woodville | C & E M Connor | 3:20.03 | Oarsman 52 | Ebony Honor 50 |
| 2002 | Maguire | 55.5 | 5g | Casual Lies (USA) | Dragon Pearl (USA) | Scott Seamer | Ken Collins, Trentham | Watson Bloodstock | 3:21.74 | Cyclades 51.5 | Ebony Honor 52.5 |
| 2001 | Our Unicorn | 56 | 6g | Zabeel (NZ) | Regal Mal (NZ) | Michael Coleman | C Alderson | K L & K K Yam | 3:26.91 | Ebony Honor 56 | Nikisha 52 |
| 2000 | Able Master | 53.5 | 4g | Zabeel (NZ) | Enhancer (NZ) | Grant Cooksley | Bruce Wallace, Takanini | Able International Syndicate | 3:22.34 | Second Coming 54.5 | In My Time 52.5 |
| 1999 | Irish Chance | 51.5 | 5g | Sir Tristram (IRE) | The Dimple (NZ) | Noel Harris | Colin Jillings & R Yuill, Takanini | Sir Michael Fay & Sir Patrick Hogan | 3:21.91 | Shans Beau 52 | Mulqueen 52 |
| 1998 | Jezabeel | 49.5 | 5m | Zabeel (NZ) | Passefleur (NZ) | Opie Bosson | Brian Jenkins, Cambridge | A Burr & B Jenkins & P Tatham | 3:19.97 | Aerosmith 50 | North Lady 50 |
| 1997 | Yobro (AUS) | 52.25 | 6g | Gypsy Kingdom (AUS) | Liase (AUS) | Grant Cooksley | Kirk W Roberts, Rosehill | Ross M Nichols | 3:23.02 | Interval 51.5 | Regal Chief 53.5 |
| 1996 | Senator | 52.5 | 5g | Sound Reason (CAN) | Platinum Lass (NZ) | Mark Sweeney | Jack Tims, Matamata | Jack Tims | 3:19.4 | Maxam 52 | Wigan Prince 50 |
| 1995 | Royal Tiara | 48 | 5m | Blanco (USA) | Maganyos (HUN) | Sarah Campbell | Stephen & Trevor McKee, Takanini | J A Wells | 3:21.24 | Popsy 48 | All In Fun 50 |
| 1994 | Miltak | 54 | 4m | McGinty (NZ) | Encore (NZ) | Lance O'Sullivan | Dave & Paul O'Sullivan, Matamata | Miltak Syndicate | 3:18.80 | Discard 51.8 | Tethys 52 |
| 1993 | Ligeiro | 49 | 4g | Lanfranco (GB) | Janeiro (NZ) | Lance O'Sullivan | J D Georgetti, Marton | Mrs D, JD, LD & Mrs SJ Georgetti | 3:18.18 | Prince Haze 51.5 | Ultimate Aim 50 |
| 1992 | Castletown | 57 | 5g | One Pound Sterling (GB) | Mona Curragh (IRE) | Noel Harris | Patrick Busuttin, Foxton | PM Busuttin, B J McCahill & KP Morris | 3:24.10 | Lurestina 50 | Cool Reception 49 |
| 1991 | Star Harvest | 50 | 7g | Harrisand (NZ) | Avon Star (NZ) | Jim Collett | Bernard Dyke, Cambridge | A Phil & Doug J & Paul F Gollan & Ernie W C Morgan | 3:22.70 | Shugar 50.5 | Coconut Ice 51 |
| 1990 | Miss Stanima | 48.5 | 5m | Islero (NZ) | Mayella (NZ) | Maree Lyndon | Murray Baker, Woodville | Larry W Dallimore & Kevin J Picone | 3:23.10 | Flying Luskin 50.25 | All Nighter 49.25 |
| 1989 | Spyglass | 50.8 | 4m | Sir Sian (NZ) | Pharoona(NZ) | Grant Cooksley | Jim Gibbs, Matamata | D G S & G S & J C S Bayley | 3:27.36 | Plume d’Or Veille 51.3 | Dark Moments 48 |
| 1988 | Sea Swift | 51.3 | 6m | Auk (USA) | Gay Dinah (NZ) | Chris Johnson | Dawn & Peter Williams, Ashburton | R I Agnew, D M Williams & the Estate of J B Thomson | 3:15.66 | Daria's Fun 50.5 | Shannon Lad 49 |
| 1987 | Kotare Chief | 50.5 | 8g | Exceptionnel (IRE) | Kotare Lass (NZ) | Jock Caddigan | Harold & Peter Ryan, Waharoa | Sir Richard Bolt & Harold Ryan | 3:16.63 | Twelve Gauge 51.5 | Threesome 51.25 |
| 1986 | Kerry Lane | 51 | 6m | Super Gray (USA) | Tipperary Gold (NZ) | Gary Grylls | Don Couchman, Hawera | Barry G & Mrs Dierdre G Neville-White & Peter J and Mrs Sharon G Walker | 3:23.87 | Duanette’s Girl 52.5 | Final Advance 47 |
| 1985 | Secured Deposit | 53.5 | 5g | Kirrama (NZ) | Touch Money (NZ) | Neil Hain | Neville G Atkins, Waiuku | Neville G Atkins, Eileen M Mackley & Dale J Ralph | 3:17.18 | Kotare Chief 48.5 | Otakiri Maid 52 |
| 1984 | Stylish Dude | 52.5 | 6g | Lonesome Dude (USA) | Taraleah (NZ) | Greg Childs | H Roger McGlade, Taupo | Ross A Parker, John S Sheffield, David J Taylor & Mrs Sue I McKenzie | 3:21.06 | Gun For Fun 51 | Fountaincourt 57 |
| 1983 | Fountaincourt | 50.5 | 4g | Pass The Bottle (USA) | Promahos (NZ) | Phillip Smith | Cyril Pfefferie, Trentham | Graham A Hodson, Peter J Madden and Ash N Paul | 3:20.59 | Maurita 49 | Daisy 53.5 |
| 1982 | Chimbu | 50 | 5g | Head Hunter (GB) | Topaz (NZ) | Philip Alderman | Lance Douglas & Alan Jones, Cambridge | Mr J R H (Bob) and Mrs Lynsey Nolan | 3:23.44 | The Twinkle 53.5 | Ruanuku 51.5 |
| 1981 | Drum | 57.5 | 5g | War Hawk II (GB) | Nevertheless (NZ) | Chris McNab | Don Sellwood, Hastings | G Pat Donnelly, Ken H and Wayne K Pike and D G Sellwood | 3:21.80 | Decibel 49 | Northfleet 52 |
| 1980 | Blue Denim | 51 | 4m | A Chara (GB) | Blue Carlyle (NZ) | Robert Vance | Dave O'Sullivan, Matamata | Phil H P Bayley and V Trevor Bennett | 3:25.70 | Magistrate 54.5 | Reading 49 |
| 1979 | Tamboura | 52.5 | 5h | Papillion (NZ) | Rodella (NZ) | Robert Vance | Brian Cameron, Tokoroa | Brian B and Mrs N J Cameron and Herb E Pearce | 3:22.00 | Happy Union 58 | Optica 52 |
| 1978 | Stylemaster | 51 | 5g | All A’Light (GB) | Pekapekarau (NZ) | Chris McNab | Bill Weal, Te Awamutu | E B Weal | 3:20.50 | Harp 52 | Good Lord 59 |
| 1977 | Royal Cadenza | 50 | 4g | Bucaroon (USA) | Cadenza (NZ) | Bob Skelton | E S Dromgool, Cambridge | B O Reed & J K Robb | 3:25.32 | Beau’s Demand 48 | Nui Dat 48.5 |
| 1976 | Perhaps | 49.5 | 4m | Stunning (GB) | Perfect Image (NZ) | Brent Thomson | Colin Jillings, Takanini | George A Jordan, Warren J Sandman and the Estate of Eric J H Shorter | 3:21.14 | Oopik 56 | Tom’s Mate 50 |
| 1975 | Kia Maia | 56 | 5m | Shy Boy (GB) | Kia U (NZ) | John Grylls | Tom Mathieson, Hawera | T B Mathieson | 3:25 | Sobeit 49.5 | Master Morgan 54 |
| 1974 | Rose Mellay | 49 | 4m | Mellay (GB) | Rosetti (NZ) | Bob Skelton | Ray Wallace, Takanini | Mrs Maureen Madsen | 3:17.6 | Battle Heights 53 | Valiant Warrior 49.5 |
| 1973 | Apollo Eleven | 8.1 | 5h | Cyrus (IRE) | Lady Rizzio (NZ) | Brian Andrews | Merv Ritchie, Takanini | J D Foote | 3:20 | Ribaldo | Rustler |
| 1972 | Sailing Home | 8.9 | 6m | Dogger Bank (GB) | Chocolate (NZ) | John Riordan | Joyce Edgar Jones | J E Jones | 3:27 | Fort Street | Monty |
| 1971 | Artifice | 8.4 | 4m | Gate Keeper (GB) | Innuendo (NZ) | Midge Didham | Jim Didham, Otaki | G H & Mrs S A Murdoch | 3:20 | Stimulate | Johnny Cash |
| 1970 | Il Tempo | 8.9 | 7g | Time And Again (IRE) | Timing (NZ) | Neil Riordan | Bruce Priscott, Te Awamutu | W B Priscott | 3:19 | Sailing Home | Johnny Cash |
| 1969 | Il Tempo | 7.10 | 6g | Time And Again (IRE) | Timing (NZ) | Neil Riordan | Bruce Priscott, Te Awamutu | W B Priscott | 3:20 | City Court | Styleman |
| 1968 | Bright Chief | 7.8 | 7g | Red Mars (GB) | Nataua (NZ) | Nigel Landers | Clarrie Robinson, Matamata | W A Schaare | 3:23 | Il Tempo | Geyser Lord |
| 1967 | Royal Sheen | 7.10 | 6g | Chatsworth II (GB) | Alluring (NZ) | David Peake | George Cameron, Takanini | R E P Millen | 3:19.6 | Terrific | Midnight Kiss |
| 1966 | Apa | 7.12 | 7g | Gabador (FR) | Kings Lady (NZ) | Ken Reggett | Ken Thomson, Otaki | W H Lee | 3:20 | Hold Defoe | Yardstick |
| 1965 | Lucky Son | 8.2 | 5g | Isaac Of York (GB) | Penfold (NZ) | Bill Skelton | Bill Skelton, Levin | J B Brown | 3:20 | Gold Chick | Fair Tiger |
| 1964 | Senor | 7.7 | 6g | Le Filou (FR) | Set Fair (NZ) | Garry Edge | Ivan Robinson, Matangi | I Robinson | 3:22.2 | Polo Prince | Summer Regent |
| 1963 | Stipulate | 8.11 | 5h | Count Rendered (GB) | Faline (NZ) | John Anderson | Colin Jillings, Takanini | A E Davis | 3:20 | Ruato | Even Stevens |
| 1962 | Flotulla | 7.1 | 5g | Le Filou (FR) | Cimtulla (NZ) | David Racklander | Ray Cotter, Te Rapa | H J Teddy | 3:22.6 | Ruato | Conference |
| 1961 | Ruato | 7.6 | 4g | Llanstephan (GB) | Golden Somet (NZ) | Ross Fisher | Nick Martin, Wanganui | D J Wilkie | 3:22.6 | Ma Cherie | Daysun |
| 1960 | Marie Brizard | 8.11 | 5m | Gabador (FR) | Quill (NZ) | John Riordan | David Arnott, Te Aroha | H L G Macindoe | 3:20.8 | Aircraft | Froth |
| 1959 | Froth | 8.0 | 4m | Faux Tirage (GB) | Homebrew (NZ) | John Anderson | Davey Jones, Hastings | Mrs J N Lowry | 3:19.8 | Royal Jester | Foxmara |
| 1958 | Red Eagle | 8.5 | 4g | Revelation (GB) | Lady Cometary (NZ) | Max Dulieu | Mark Martinovich, Matamata | Mrs M Cameron | 3:19.6 | Passive | |

== Previous winners ==
The following are earlier winners of the Auckland Cup.

- 1957 – NOT HELD
- 1956 – Yeman (ridden by R J Jury)
- 1955 – Tesla (J W Harris)
- 1954 – Arawa (Grenville Hughes)
- 1953 – Coaltown (C H Mackie)
- 1952 – Rev (J A McFarlane)
- 1951 – Classowa (H N Wiggins)
- 1950 – Beaumaris (C T Wilson)
- 1949 – Swanee (M A Martinovich)
- 1948 – Frances (N A Crombie)
- 1947 – Balgowan (W R Hooton)
- 1946 – Sylis (R L Parker)
- 1945 – Expanse (H N Wiggins)
- 1944 – Foxwyn (C B Goulsbro)
- 1943 – Lord Chancellor (H N Wiggins)
- 1942 – Kindergarten (A E Ellis)
- 1941 – Piastre (AUS) (N Vaughan)
- 1940 – Beau Vite (A E Ellis)
- 1939 – Cheval De Volee
- 1938 – Cheval De Volee
- 1937 – The Buzzer
- 1936 – Cuddle
- 1935 – Cuddle
- 1934 – Gold Trail
- 1933 – Minerval
- 1932 – Fast Passage
- 1931 – Admiral Drake
- 1930 – Motere
- 1929 – Concentrate
- 1928 – Corinax (AUS)
- 1927 – Rapier
- 1926 – Tanadees (AUS)
- 1925 – Rapine
- 1924 – Te Kara
- 1923 – Muraahi/Te Kara
- 1922 – Scion
- 1921 – Malaga
- 1920 – Starland
- 1919 – Karo
- 1918 – Mascot
- 1917 – Fiery Cross
- 1916 – Depredation
- 1915 – Balboa
- 1914 – Warstep
- 1913 – Sir Solo
- 1912 – Bobrikoff
- 1911 – Santa Rosa
- 1910 – Waimangu
- 1909 – All Red
- 1908 – All Red
- 1907 – Zimmerman
- 1906 – Master Delaval
- 1905 – Putty
- 1904 – Mahutonga
- 1903 – Wairiki
- 1902 – Siege Gun
- 1901 – St. Michael
- 1900 – Blue Jacket
- 1899 – Blue Jacket
- 1898 – Uhlan
- 1897 – Antares
- 1896 – Nestor
- 1895 – Anita
- 1894 – Lottie
- 1893 – Pegasus
- 1892 – St. Hippo
- 1891 – Pinfire
- 1890 – Crackshot
- 1889 – Leopold
- 1888 – Lochiel
- 1887 – Nelson (AUS)
- 1886 – Nelson (AUS)
- 1885 – Nelson (AUS)
- 1884 – The Poet
- 1883 – Salvage
- 1882 – Welcome Jack
- 1881 – King Quail
- 1880 – Foul Play
- 1879 – Ariel
- 1878 – Ariel
- 1877 – Lara
- 1876 – Ariel
- 1875 – Kingfisher
- 1874 – Templeton

== See also ==
- Recent Winners of major NZ cup races
- Auckland Cup Week
- Bonecrusher New Zealand Stakes
- New Zealand Derby
- Wellington Cup
- New Zealand Cup
