= Il Tempo (horse) =

New Zealand-bred Thoroughbred racehorse

- Sire: Time and Again (IRE)
- Grandsire: The Phoenix (GB)
- Dam: Timing (NZ)
- Damsire: Timanova (GB)
- Sex: Gelding
- Foaled: 1962
- Country: New Zealand
- Colour: Bay
- Owner: Bruce Priscott (NZ)
- Trainer: Bruce Priscott (NZ)

Major wins
- 1970 Wellington Cup; 1970 Auckland Cup; 1969 Auckland Cup

Honours
- World record over 2 miles of 3:16.2, still current.
- Last updated on April 13, 2009

Il Tempo was a champion New Zealand thoroughbred racehorse, sired by Time and Again out of Timing. He is widely regarded as New Zealand's greatest ever stayer, having won the Auckland Cup two times, and also the Wellington Cup once. The Wellington Cup ran over 2 miles and he won it in a world-record time of 3:16.2, a record which still stands today.

Il Tempo also won the Chalmers Handicap over two miles, plus being placed over the two-mile distance several times. He was trained by Mr Bruce Priscott, a butcher by trade. Normally he was ridden by jockey Noel D Riordan.

He had a fantastic fresh up record. Il Tempo also won a weight for age over one and a half miles. Normally a powerful finishing back runner, in a very small field he eventually took up the running and then was passed by the whole field and then came again to mow them down.

Il Tempo was top-weight and hot pre-post favorite for the 1970 Melbourne Cup, but did not race. In his preparation for the cup, he broke down after running a 1 min. 39.0 sec. mile in a training gallop. He never raced again.

== World record ==
The Wellington Cup was over 2 miles and he won it in a world-record time of 3:16.2. To do this he beat a top class field including Highland Rebel, who finished second and also broke the previous world record, and champion race mare Honour Me, who finished third. This world record still stands as an imperial world record today. To put this into perspective, the record holder of the two-mile Melbourne Cup is Rain Lover, with a time of 3.19.1, set in 1968. The Melbourne Cup distance was changed to 3200 meters (about 20 metres shorter) in 1972, and the record is held by Kingston Rule at 3.16.3. The equivalent metric time for Il Tempo's run would be about 1.2 secs quicker than for two miles, or 3.15.00. In April 2006 the Japanese champion Deep Impact won the 3200m Tenno Sho (Spring) in 3.13.4, smashing the world record for that distance.

== See also ==
- Thoroughbred racing in New Zealand
