= Wellington Cup =

New Zealand thoroughbred horse race

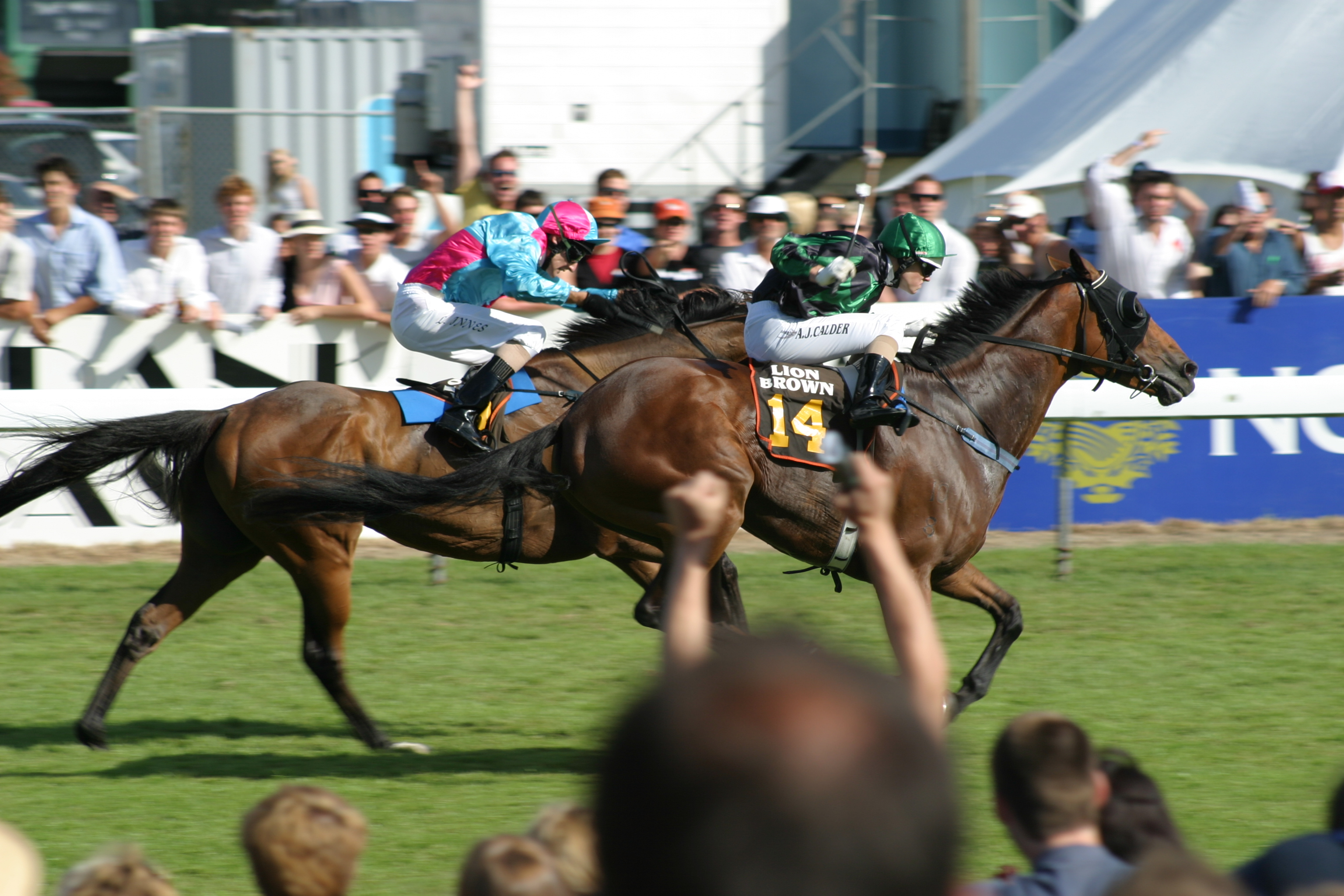
- Cluden Creek winning the 2004 Wellington Cup
- Class: Group 3
- Location: Trentham Racecourse; Trentham; Wellington Region (New Zealand)
- Inaugurated: 1874
- Race type: Thoroughbred - Flat racing
- Website: Trentham Racecourse

Race information
- Distance: 3200 metres
- Surface: Turf
- Track: Left-handed
- Qualification: Three-Year-Olds and Up
- Weight: Handicap
- Purse: NZ$400,000 (2026)

The Wellington Cup is a Group 3 Thoroughbred horse race in New Zealand held annually in January by the Wellington Racing Club at Trentham Racecourse in Trentham.

== History ==
Inaugurated in 1874, the Wellington Cup has been raced over various distances:

- 2 miles : 1874-1889
- 1 1/2 miles : 1890-1941
- 2 miles : 1942-1973
- 3200 metres : 1974-2008
- 2400 metres : 2009-2015
- 3200 metres : 2016 onwards

There were two prior Wellington Cups in 1867 and 1868. These were unofficial events run by the first Wellington Jockey Club and not recognised by the NZ Turf Register.

The Wellington Cup is one of New Zealand's most famous and popular races and it generally offers stake money which belies its Group Three status. Wellington Cup day attracts large crowds to Trentham Racecourse and the other races on the card have include the Group Three Desert Gold Stakes and the Douro Cup. In the past years the Group One Thorndon Mile was on Wellington Cup day, it is now raced a week earlier along with the Trentham Stakes.

The Wellington Cup was a Group 1 race until 2008. Given the prestige of the race, there was some disappointment at the news that the race would lose its Group One status from 2009. The Wellington Racing Club responded to the downgrade by reducing the distance to 2400 metres in order to attract a higher quality field. However, the race reverted to 3200m from 2016 to help encourage New Zealand stayers. In 2017 the race was downgraded again to Group Three status.

Queen Elizabeth II attended in 1970.

One of the most famous winners of the Wellington Cup was Kiwi, ridden by Jimmy Cassidy. The pair went on to win the 1983 Melbourne Cup for trainer, Snow Lupton of Waverley. Snow's grand-daughter Jaimee-Lee Lupton trained the 2020 Wellington Cup winner Soleseifei.

In past years the Wellington Racing Club arranged celebrity guests of honour such as:

- Rachel Hunter and Rod Stewart in 1994.
- Sir Edmund Hillary was appropriately there to present the trophy to 1995 winner Ed along with Cheryl Ladd and One West Waikiki actor Richard Burgi.
- Jonah Lomu in 1996.
- Miss World winner Jacqueline Aguilera in 1997.

The 2023 Wellington Cup was the 150th edition of the race.

The biggest dividend paid for a Wellington Cup winner was $180 for Simon de Montfort, ridden by Brian Dodds in 1972. In the 1999 race Miss Bailey paid $143.70 for the win and in 2026 Manzor Blue paid $86.80.

The 2024 edition was on the last race-day of calling by Tony Lee, after a 40 year career.

== 1954 racebook ==
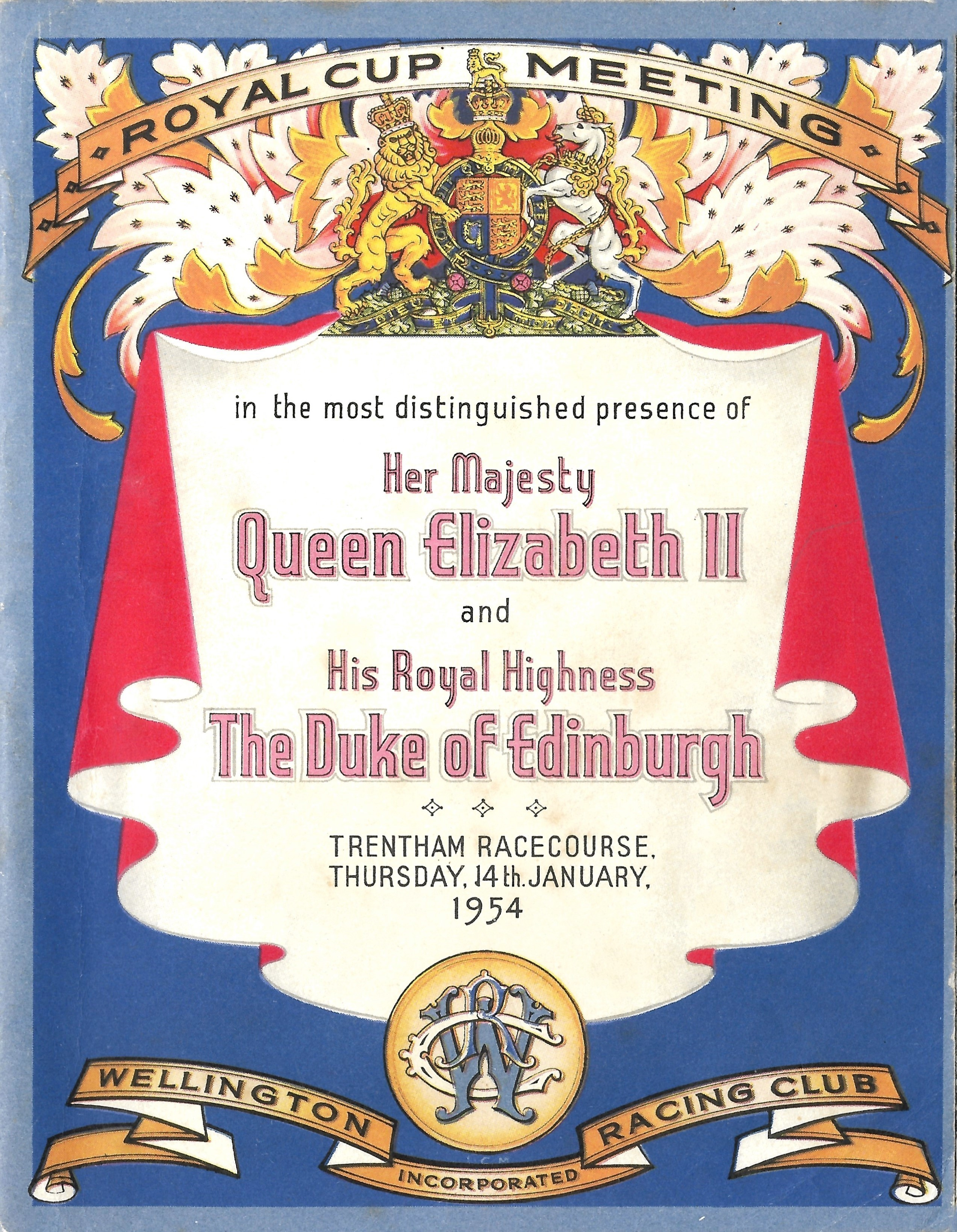
1954 WRC Wellington Cup racebook front cover

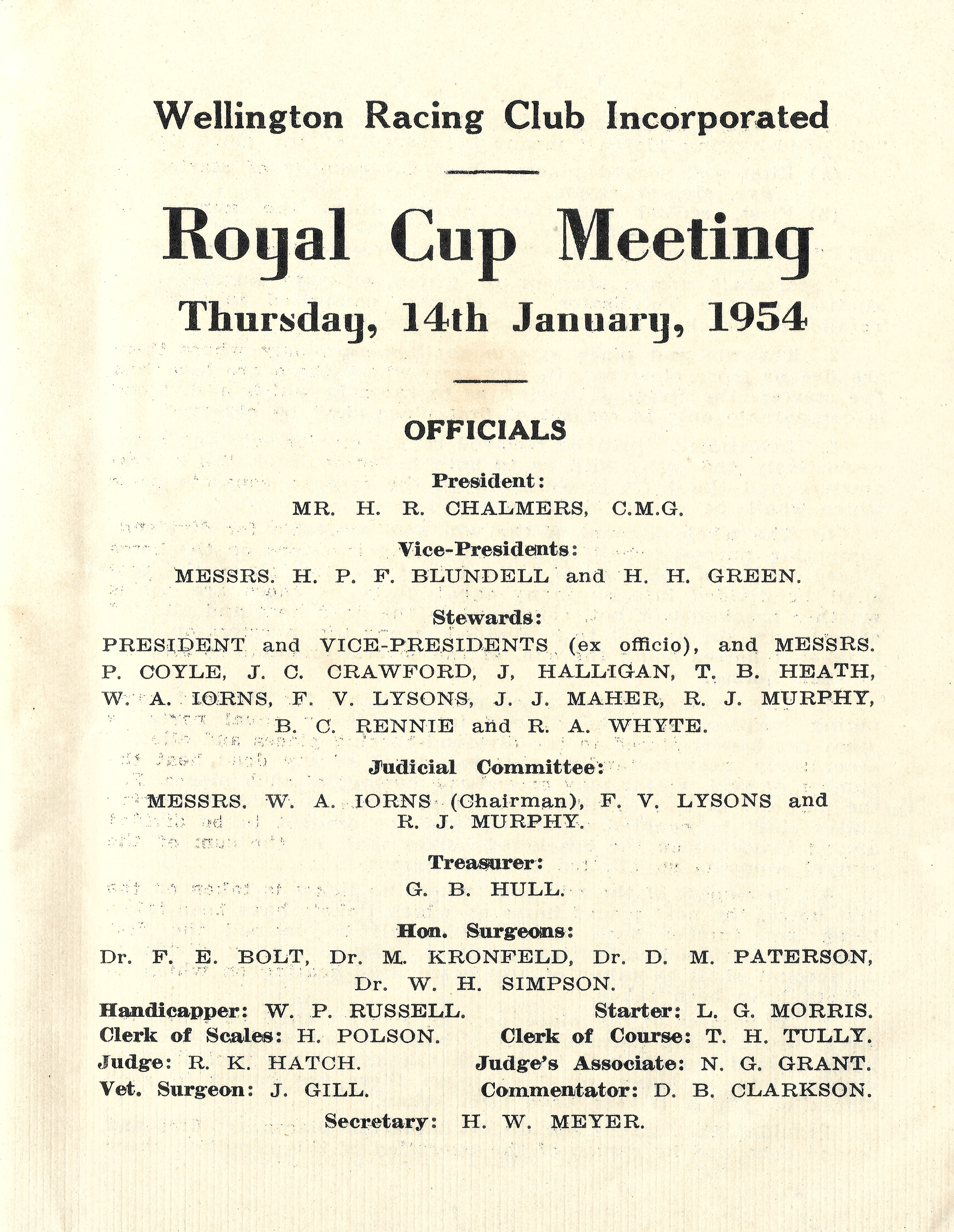
1954 WRC Wellington Cup raceday officials

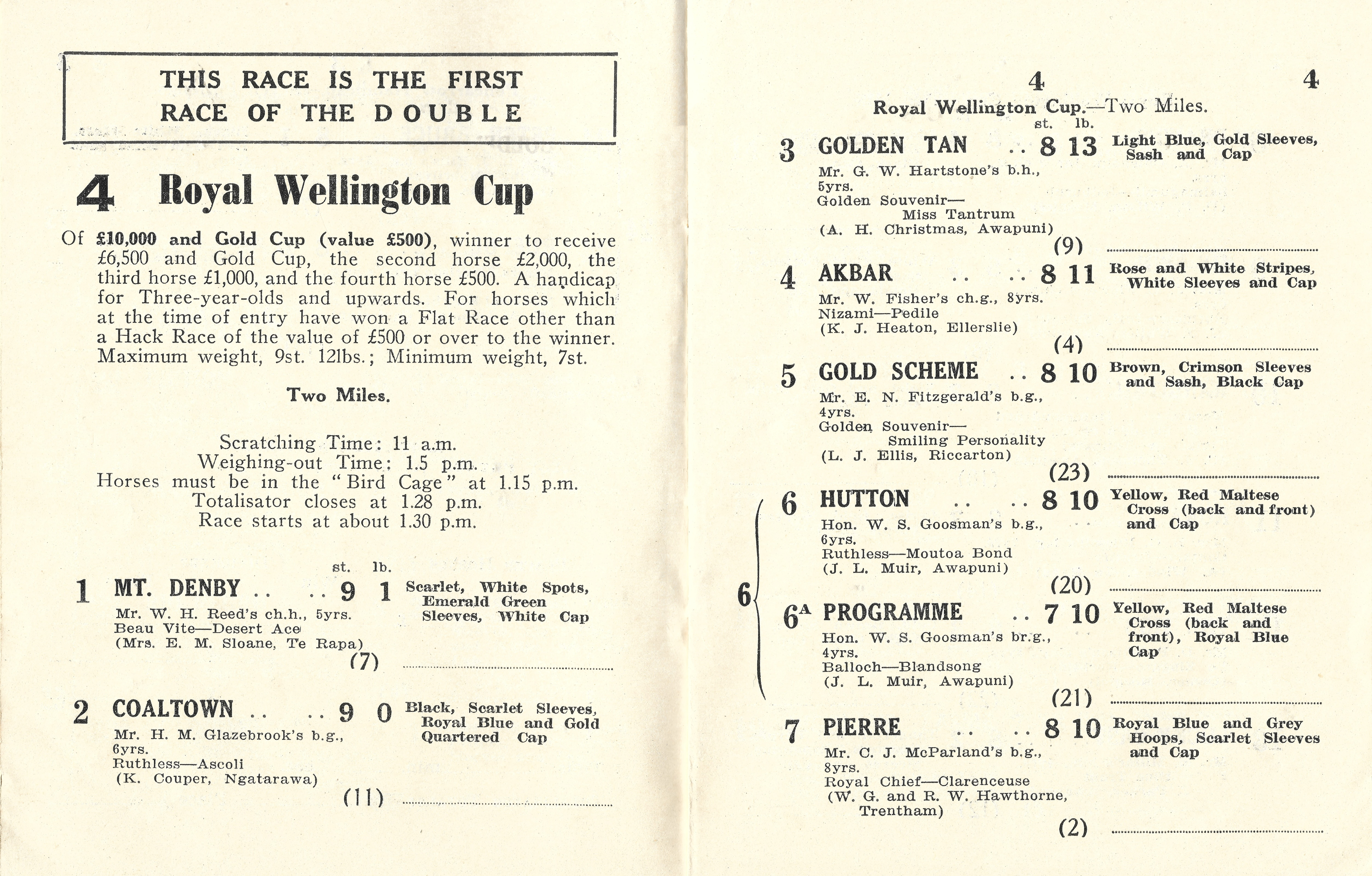
1954 WRC Wellington Cup showing the winner, Golden Tan

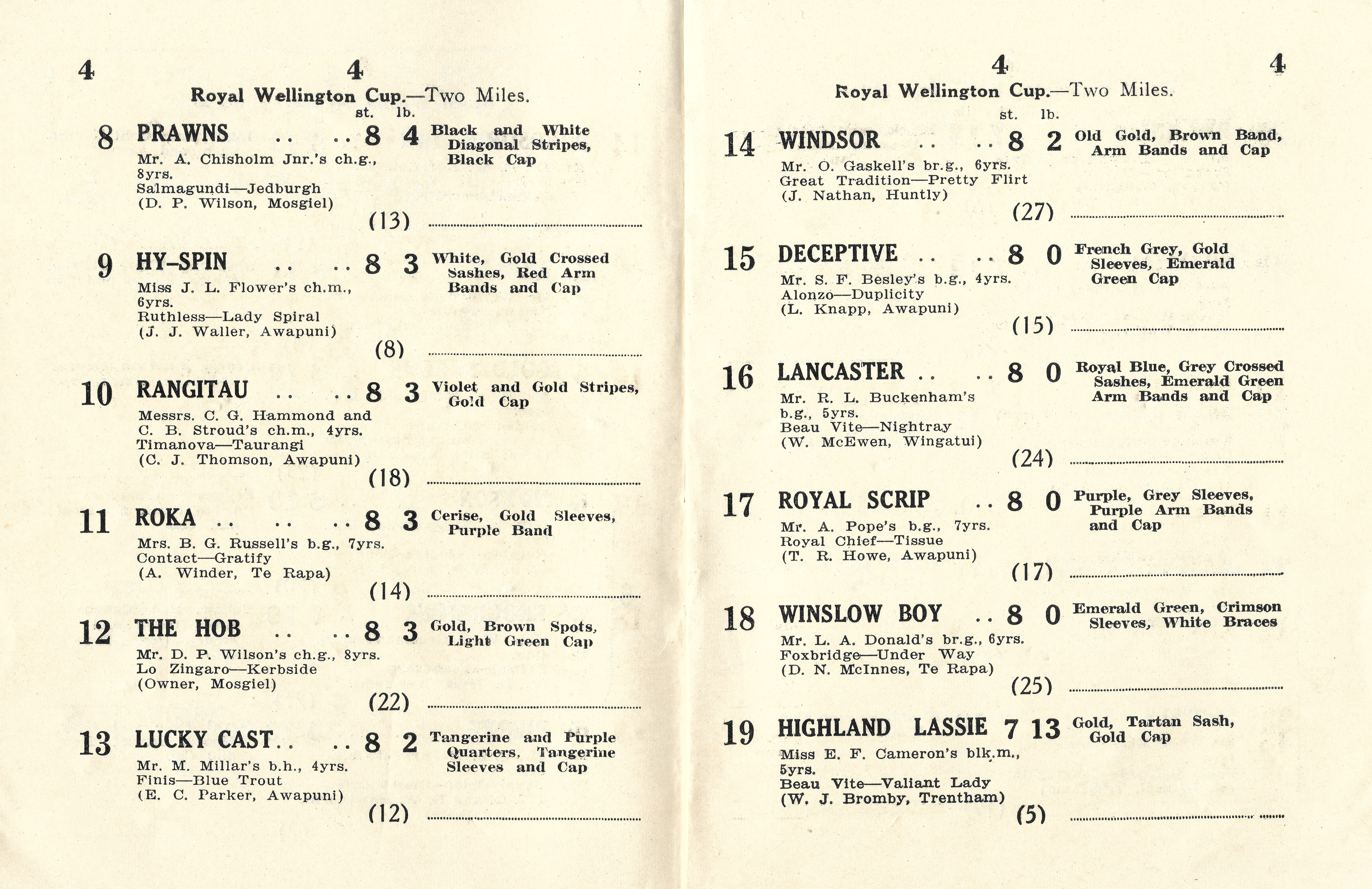
1954 WRC Wellington Cup starters and results

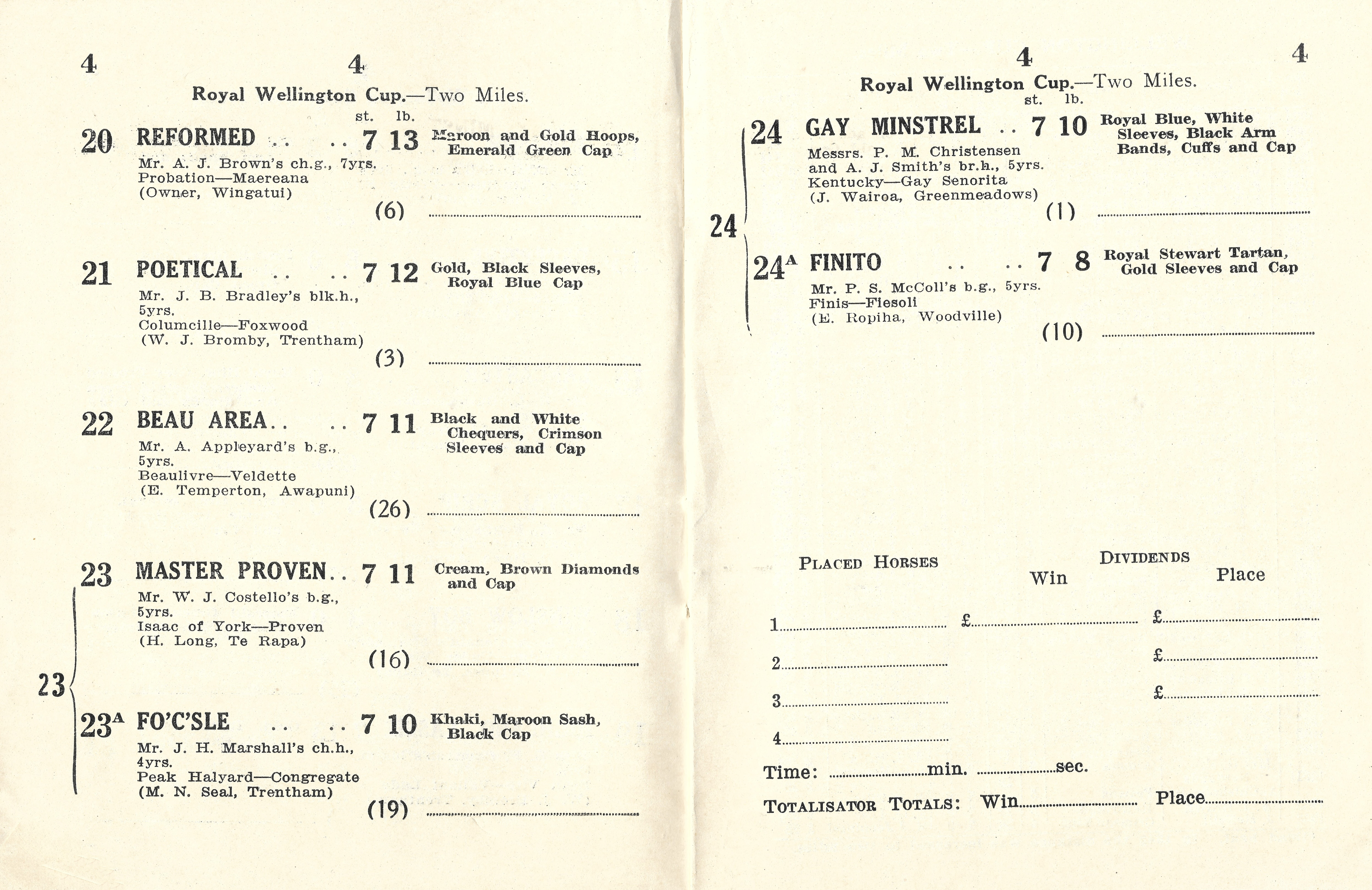
1954 WRC Wellington Cup starters and results

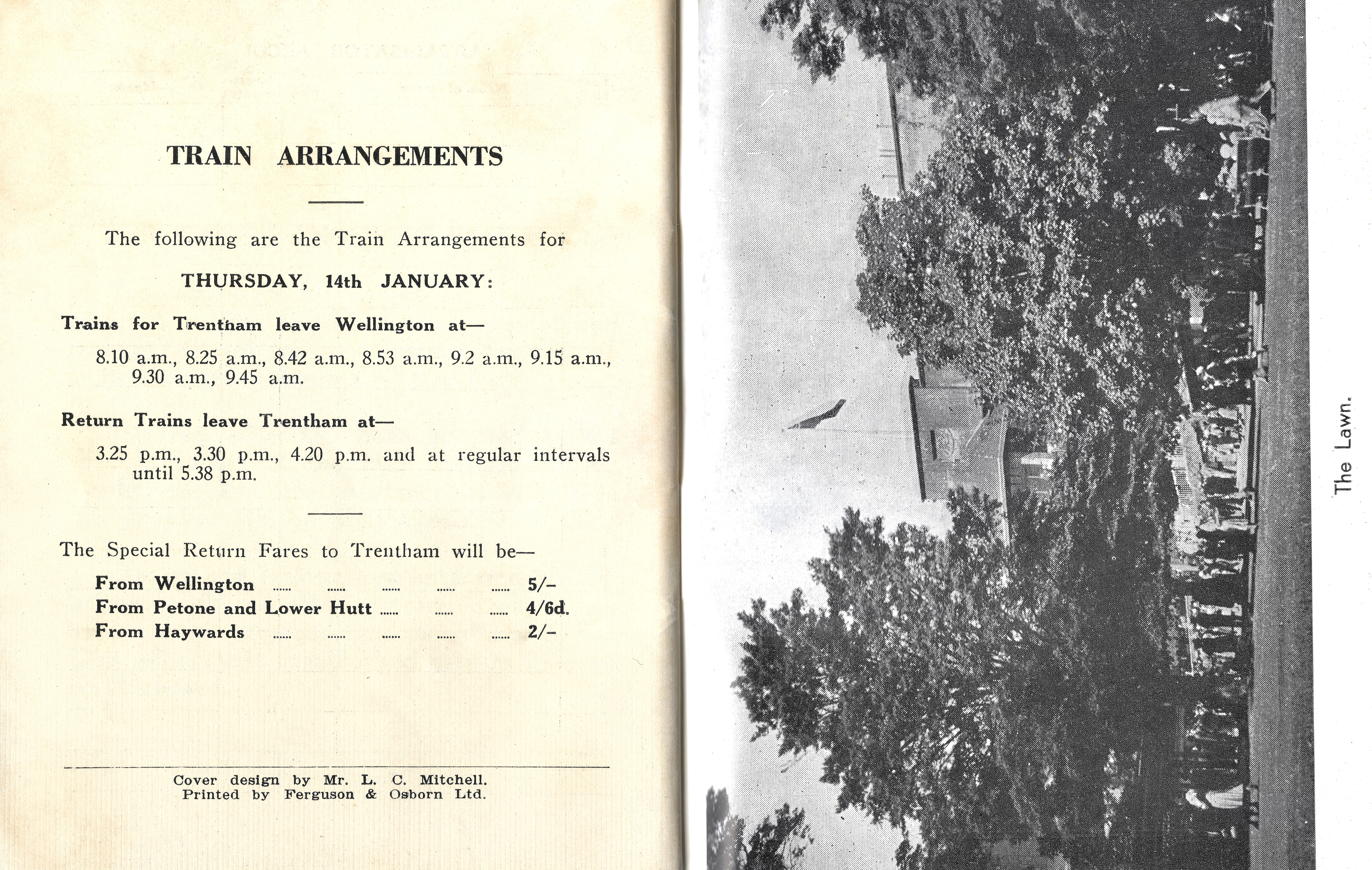
1954 WRC Wellington Cup train arrangements

== Records ==
Speed record:

- 3:15.59 - Daria's Fun (1988) for 3200 metres.
- 3:16.2 - Il Tempo (1970) for the pre-1974 distance of 2 miles.
- 2:26.65 - Maygrove (2015) over the 2400m journey raced from 2009 and 2015.

Most wins:

- 3 - Cynisca (1890, 1891, 1892).
- 3 - Great Sensation (1961, 1962, 1963).
- 3 - Castletown (1991, 1992, 1994).

Most wins by a jockey:

- 6 - Bob Derrett (1880, 1881, 1885, 1892, 1894, 1898)
- 6 - Roy Reed (1919, 1920, 1921, 1923, 1928, 1932)
- 5 - Bob Skelton (1959, 1961, 1962, 1963, 1969)

Most wins by a trainer:

- 4 - Michael Moroney (1996, 2000, 2014, 2016)

== Winners of the Wellington Cup since 1953 ==
Year	Winner	Wgt	Age	Sire	Dam	Jockey	Trainer(s)	Owner	Time	Second	Third
2026	Manzor Blue	53	5m	Almanzor	Turquoise Coast	Kate Hercock	Lisa Latta	Go Racing Amalfi Syndicate	3:19.91 (good)	Crouch 53	Be Real 53
2025	Wolfgang	55	6g	Puccini	Navy Beach	Joe Doyle	Peter & Shaun McKay	Simms Davison, Kim & Peter McKay	3:20.68 (good)	Crouch 53	Nest Egg 53
2024	Mary Louise	56	5m	The Bold One	Daisy Louise by Catbird (AUS)	Craig Grylls	Robbie Patterson, New Plymouth	E M & N A Bourke & A R Piercy	3:23.65 (soft)	Fierce Flight 58	Canheroc 53
2023	Leaderboard	53	8g	Street Cry (IRE)	Flower Fairy (USA) by Dynaformer (USA)	Joe Doyle	Mark Walker	Fortuna Leaderboard Syndicate (Mgr: John Galvin)	3:33.01 (heavy)	Contemplation 54	Dionysus 57
2022	Lincoln King	56	7g	Shocking (AUS)	Shi Kin Fly by Shinko King (IRE)	Craig Grylls	Stephen Marsh	Lincoln Farms Bloodstock Ltd, Wellfield Holdings Ltd, Exempt Bloodstock Ltd, Stephen Marsh & Peter Gillespie	3:23.21 (good)	Starrybeel 55.5	He No Opilio 54
2021	Waisake	53	6g	Zed	Kincia by Kinjite	Samantha Collett	Alan Sharrock, New Plymouth	LR Butler, JM & KA Horner, A & NJ Macdonald, B & E Menzies, PV Mullen, BC & MC Schumacher & SA Sharrock	3:22.85 (good)	Bluey's Chance 53	Justamaiz 53
2020	Soleseifei	53	7m	Shocking (AUS)	Evaline by Van Nistelrooy (USA)	Trudy Thornton	Jaimee-Lee Lupton, Waverley	L Ridge & Ms M Slagter	3:20.03 (good)	The Good Fight 54	Toms 55.5
2019	Gorbachev	53	5g	Gorky Park	Gimmeawink (AUS) by Carnegie (IRE)	Ryan Elliot	Bryce Newman, Bulls	P Bardell, F J P Huwyler, B K O'Dea & K T O'Donnell	3:22.49 (good)	Dee And Gee 53	Prince Jabeel 59
2018	Magic Chai	53	5g	Magic Albert (AUS)	Chai (AUS) by Viscount (AUS)	Michael McNab	Tony Pike, Cambridge	MA & Mrs SL Treweek	3:25.19 (good)	Sampson 53	Alinko Prince 53
2017	Savaria	56.5	5m	Savabeel	Amathea by O'Reilly	Hayden Tinsley	Roydon Bergerson, Awapuni	DP & Mrs KC Fleming	3:21.90 (good)	Jackstar 58	Perfect Start 56.5
2016	Mister Impatience	52.5	6g	Hernando (FRA)	Katy Nowaitee (GB) by Komaite	Samantha Spratt	Michael Moroney & Chad Ormsby, Matamata	R Legh, GG Syndicate Ltd, K Millar, G Sharp, A Locantro, H Hansen, J O'Neill, G Van Ameyden, P Merton & L Neradovsky	3:21.60 (good)	Pentathon 53	Sampson 56
2015	Maygrove	52.5	5g	Authorized (IRE)	Lady Zhivago by Zabeel	Matthew Cameron	Murray Baker & Andrew Forsman, Cambridge	JML Bloodstock Ltd (Mgr L Petagna) & PW O'Rourke	2:26.65 (2400m, good)	Perfect Start 53	She's Insatiable 52
2014	Graphic	52	5g	Volksraad (GB)	Taitanium by Kingdom Bay	Craig Grylls	Michael Moroney & Chad Ormsby, Matamata	Christopher R & Susanna Grace	2:29.30 (2400m, good)	Skysoblue 53	Guns At Five 57
2013	Blood Brotha	54	7g	Danzigill (AUS)	Laura Dee (NZ) by Personal Escort (USA)	Lisa Allpress	Raymond Connors, Bulls	M S & R M Connors	2:31.32 (2400m)	Annie Higgins 52.5	Dolmabache 54
2012	Six O'Clock News	56	7g	Zabeel (NZ)	Maurine (NZ) by Harbor Prince (USA)	Leith Innes	Trent Busuttin & Natalie Young, Cambridge	Six O'Clock News Syndicate	2:31.33 (2400m)	Spiro 58	The Jungle Boy 56
2011	Spiro	53	5g	Pyrus (USA)	Radio Rocket (NZ) by Blues Traveller (IRE)	Kane Smith	Sylvia Kay, Levin	P J & Mrs S L Kay, Mrs A J, B T, J E & R L Maetzig	2:28.82 (2400m)	Six O’Clock News 54.5	Loose Change 52.5
2010	Red Ruler	57	5g	Viking Ruler (AUS)	Ransom Bay (USA) by Red Ransom (USA)	Mark Du Plessis	John Sargent, Matamata	R J Arculli, A R Meehan & G B Sargent	2:27.42 (2400m)	Awesome Planet 52.5	Manonamission 55
2009	Megapins	52.5	5m	Pins (AUS)	Instant Divorce (NZ) by Fiesta Star (AUS)	Trudy Thornton	John & Karen Parsons, Balcairn	W R Campbell et al.	2:28.32 (2400m)	Borninthestates 53	Young Centaur 56.5
2008	Young Centaur	53.5	5g	Jeune (GB)	Centafit (NZ) by Galopede (NZ)	Michael Walker	John Sargent, Matamata	J G Sargent & A Soon Shiong	3:22.15	Resolution 52.5	Mirkola Lass 57
2007	Willy Smith	55	5g	Volksraad (GB)	Sound Lear (NZ) by Sound Reason (CAN)	Matthew Cameron	Mark Todd, Cambridge	Mrs M K Hain & M McPhail	3:22.11	Mirkola Lass 53.5	Everswindell 53
2006	Envoy	57.5	7g	Personal Escort (USA)	Sovereign Command by Bold Venture (NZ)	Grant Cooksley	Ken Kelso, Matamata	K & B Kelso, R & J White	3:22.38	Viz Vitae 58	Kajema 55.5
2005	Zabeat	53.5	5g	Rhythm (USA)	Zabest by Zabeel	Peter Johnson	Donna & Dean Logan, Ruakaka	A.M. Goodwin & Mrs. D.M. Logan	3:20.73	Gorgeous George 52	From Heaven 52
2004	Cluden Creek	51.5	5g	Yamanin Vital	Fort Girl by Beaufort Sea (USA)	Andrew Calder	John Boon, Waverley	B Barber, W Purvis & A MacDonald	3:26.49	Bel Air 53.5	Ebony Honour 52.5
2003	Oarsman	52.5	5g	The Son	Virginia Lake by Royal Loch (IRE)	Gary Grylls	Paul Duncan	B E & R W Punch	3:19.53	Wolf Creek 51.5	Mojo 52
2002	Cyclades	54.5	6g	Alleged Dash (USA)	Iris La Bonga (AUS) by Inviting (IRE)	Lance O'Sullivan	Cydne Evans, Waverley	D N & W E Pye	3:20.20	Ebony Honor 54	Blanchard 54
2001	Smiling Like	52	6m	Star Way (GB)	Eustaci by Sir Tristram (IRE)	Michael Walker	Graeme Rogerson	Sir Patrick & Lady Hogan	3:22.04	Ebony Honor 52	Starina 52
2000	Second Coming	55	5m	Oak Ridge (FR)	Superior Miss by Bassenthwaite (GB)	Michael Coleman	Michael Moroney & Andrew Scott, Matamata	A J Burton, P S Lindberg, Paul Moroney & G G Peterson.	3:20.93	McDa Knife 51	The Gifted Shifta 50.5
1999	Miss Bailey	51	7m	King's Island (IRE)	In Style by Pakistan II (GB)	Leanne Isherwood	Grant Cullen, Hastings	Grant Cullen et al.	3:21.91	Emerald 51	Beechwood Road 53
1998	Aerosmith	52	5g	Indian Ore (USA)	Luna di Miele by Barcas (USA)	Grant Cooksley	Peter & Nikki Hurdle, Awapuni	AB & DG Smith	3:22.62	Magnet Bay 52	Altrista 56
1997	Ed	53	7g	Half Iced (USA)	Mount Joy by Noble Bijou (USA)	Lance O'Sullivan	Noel Eales, Awapuni	AJ & Mrs LM Crooks	3:17.39	Bonsai Pipeline 51.5	Magnet Bay 56
1996	Yes Indeed	54.5	6g	Llanathony	Ivanip by Eastern Nip (IRE)	Jock Caddigan	Michael Moroney, Matamata	DJ & Mrs MA Deegan	3:17.85	Magnet Bay 54	Sapio 55
1995	Ed	52	5g	Half Iced (USA)	Mount Joy by Noble Bijou (USA)	Damien Oliver	Cecil Beckett, Riverton	AJ (Bert) & Mrs LM (Margaret) Crooks	3:18.25	Yes Indeed 50.5	All In Fun 57
1994	Castletown	58	7g	One Pound Sterling (GB)	Mona Curragh (IRE) by Levmoss (IRE)	Noel Harris	Patrick Busuttin, Foxton	PM Busuttin, BJ McCahill, KP Morris	3:18.63	Tawbeau 48.5	Ultimate Aim 52.5
1993	Dancing Lord	48.5	6g	Nuage d'Or (USA)	Tingo Time by Bellissimo (FR)	Leanne Isherwood	MI Pearson, Hastings	KS Lee	3:18.19	Ebury 48	Tall Emperor 49
1992	Castletown	58	5g	One Pound Sterling (GB)	Mona Curragh (IRE) by Levmoss (IRE)	Noel Harris	Patrick Busuttin, Foxton	PM Busuttin, BJ McCahill, KP Morris	3:19.33	Schnapps 50.5	The Yapper 50
1991	Castletown	55	4g	One Pound Sterling (GB)	Mona Curragh (IRE) by Levmoss (IRE)	Noel Harris	Patrick Busuttin, Foxton	PM Busuttin, BJ McCahill, KP Morris	3:18.37	Shuzohra 55.5	Coconut Ice 53
1990	Flying Luskin	54.5	5g	Luskin Star (AUS)	Queen Amarco (AUS) by Authentic Heir (AUS)	Peter Johnson	Stephen & Trevor McKee, Takanini	Joe Karam, Trevor McKee, Peter J Walker, John A Wells	3:20.52	Lord Mellay 54	All Nighter 52.5
1989	Noble Khan	48	7g	Royal Noble (USA)	Sharonette by Sharivari (USA)	Peter Ayres	Don Sellwood, Hastings	R J Fleetwood, Mrs M C Kuzmich, D G Terry & J A Willmott	3:19.21	Fleetward Lad 50.3	Bouillan 48.5
1988	Daria's Fun	53.5	6m	Go Fun	Daria Song by Skyhawk (GB)	Gary Stewart	Mrs S E H Ellis	D A Hodgetts, D W Mayers & M D Richardson	3:15.59	Banderol 49.5	Double Lang 51.5
1987	Rastes	49	6	Super Grey (USA)	Sind by Sobig	Paul Taylor	Danny Walker	N K Allen, Miss P S Brough, P J Marron Jnr & R D Seivers	3:22.56	Blovinski 53.5	Lu 51.5
1986	Samasaan	54	5	Zamazaan (FR)	Desert Love (IRE) by Home Guard (USA)	Chris Johnson	Garth Jackson, Riccarton	M R Bell, I H Harrison, G A Jackson	3:23.22	Curved Air 52	Whitole 56
1985	Imaprince	51	4	Heir Apparent II (USA)	Peka Princess by Bottle Top	Philip Mercer	Mick Preston, Otaki	J C Bell	3:22.27	Secured Deposit 57	Duanette's Girl 49
1984	Secured Deposit	51.5	4	Kirrama	Touch Money by Ironic (GB)	Neil Hain	Neville Atkins, Waiuku	Eileen Mackley, Dale Ralph & Neville Atkins	3:22.6	Isle of Man 54.5	Suttle Knight 50.5
1983	Kiwi	50.5	5g	Blarney Kiss (USA)	Malrayvis by Messmate (GB)	Jimmy Cassidy	E S (Snow) Lupton, Waverley	E S & Mrs Lupton	3:20.29	Maurita 50.5	Macloud 50.5
1982	Ruakuna	53	6	Alvaro (GB)	Te Ruahine by Sajakeda (AUS)	Stephen Autridge	Leonie Pratt, Cambridge	M H Tims & Estate W J Pratt	3:19.25	Azawary 50	Unique 48.5
1981	Koiro Trelay	53.5	5	Trelay	Corrieann by Kurdistan (GB)	Phillip Smith	Eric Temperton, Awapuni	D G Canning	3:18.75	Arethusa 50	Eruption 52.5
1980	Cubacade	52	6	Alvaro (GB)	Robin Marie by Rawalpindi (GB)	Jim Walker	Don Couchman, Hawera	R & Mrs Gallagher	3:23.51	Zamalou 53	Koiro Trelay 51.5
1979	Big Gamble	51	5	Sobig	Gay Amber by Broiefort (FR)	Toby Autridge	Howie Mathews, Matamata	D P McLennan, H J & Mrs Tapper	3:19.25	Northfleet 49	Magistrate 53
1978	Good Lord	58	6g	Zamazaan (FR)	Love in Bloom (AUS) by Todman (AUS)	David Peake	Ray Verner, Takanini	M L Hines	3:18.00	Big Gamble 49.5	Caruba 51.5
1977	Good Lord	53	5g	Zamazaan (FR)	Love in Bloom (AUS) by Todman (AUS)	Bruce Compton	Ray Verner, Takanini	M L Hines	3:24.5	Show Gate 57	Our Countess 53
1976	Guest Star	53.5	5	Crest of the Wave (GB)	Queen's Navy by Bahershah (GB)	Maurice Campbell	Ivan & I R Tucker, Takanini	I J Tucker	3:20.75	Royal Dell 49.25	Oopik 56.5
1975	Timon	52	6	Oakville (GB)	Catalan by Oman (FR)	Gary Willets	Frederick Phillips, Matangi	G R Pollock	3:23.00	Guest Star 52	Apollo Eleven 53
1974	Battle Heights	54	6g	Battle-Waggon (GB)	Wuthering Heights by Avocat General (IRE)	Alwin Tweedie	Tim Douglas, Morrinsville	R F & Mrs Douglas	3:23.5	Manchero 48	Rose Mellay 55.5
1973	Rustler	7.11	4	Sobig	Verve by Ruthless	David Peake	Merv Ritchie, Takanini	J C & Mrs Fletcher	3:20.75	Glengowan	
1972	Simon de Montfort	7.8	6	Better Honey (GB)	De Montfort by Super (GB)	Brian Dodds	Fred Meynell, Hawera	Mrs T G Whenlan	3:17.75	Suttle	Duty Free
1971	Ansin	7.4	5	Cracksman	Fredrika by Jekyll (GB)	David Peake	Jack Winder, Te Rapa	M I Matulich	3:19.25	Princess Mellay	Spectre
1970	Il Tempo	7.12	7	Time and Again (IRE)	Timing by Timanova (GB)	Neil Riordan	Bruce Priscott, Te Awamutu	W B Priscott	3:16.75		
1969	City Court	8.0	4	Final Court (GB)	Melbourne by Underwood (GB)	Bob Skelton	Ray Wallace, Takanini	A K Sharp	3:17.50	Il Tempo	Spring Filou
1968	Loofah	8.5	4	Arragon (GB)	Lady Doss by Royal Arch (GB)	Bill Skelton	Buster O’Malley, Levin	A O’Malley	3:20.25	Bright Chief	Il Tempo
1967	Michael Molloy	7.5	4	Le Filou (FR)	Fianna Fail by Baffles (GB)	Murray Long	Jim Hely, Te Rapa	S Caddigan & Estate H P Long	3:19.75	Palisade	Red Siren
1966	Red Crest	7.7	5	Gigantic	Lovemorn by Nightly	Brian Andrews	Jack Winder, Te Rapa	I A McMullin & J F Rendle	3:27.5	Eiffel Tower	Clipjoint
1965	Eiffel Tower	7.5	4	Kurdistan (GB)	Bell Tower by Columcille (GB)	Midge Didham	Bill Hillis, Riverton	W E Hazlett	3:22.75	Dandeinee	Calm Court
1964	Gay Filou	8.3	6	Le Filou (FR)	Contrive by Contact (AUS)	Grenville Hughes	Ivan McClure, Riccarton	D D Fea & R Smith	3:21.25	Polo Prince	Summer Regent
1963	Great Sensation	9.7	10g	Cassock (GB)	Speedy by Irish Lancer (GB)	Bob Skelton	Mick Brown, Wingatui	D W Brown	3:19	Stipulate	Blue Blade
1962	Great Sensation	9.6	9g	Cassock (GB)	Speedy by Irish Lancer (GB)	Bob Skelton	Mick Brown, Wingatui	D W Brown	3:20	Ruato	Marwon
1961	Great Sensation	9.2	8g	Cassock (GB)	Speedy by Irish Lancer (GB)	Bob Skelton	Mick Brown, Wingatui	D W Brown	3:17.5	Quite Able	Ilumquh
1960	Jalna	7.5	4	Count Rendered (GB)	Mahzami by Nizami (FR)	Billy Smith	Dave Arnott, Te Aroha	H C Adams & P G Henwood	3:18	Sparkler	Great Sensation
1959	Ark Royal			Marco Polo (FR)	Battle Cruiser by Battle Song (GB)	Bob Skelton	Ashley Powell	G J Barton	3:20.25		
1958	Yeman			Sabaean (GB)	Wardress by Lord Warden (GB)	R J Jury		H Koran & S N Sparks	3:19.0		
1957	Sombrero			Someo (IRE)	Seropuri by Bulandshar (GB)	Bill Broughton		Mrs G Wall	3:21.0		
1956	Fox Myth			Foxbridge (GB)	Nereid by Neptune (GB)	D J Wyatt	Harry S Limmer	Harry S Limmer	3:21.25		
1955	Golden Galleon			Admiral's Luck (GB)	Rosina by Nizami (FR)	L J Hodren		Sir Matthew Oram	3:22.5		
1954	Golden Tan			Golden Souvenir	Miss Tantrum by Siegfried (GB)	J Garth		G W Hartshone	3:22.5		
1953	Crimson King			Balloch (GB)	Lucetta by Captain Bunsby (GB)	M J Jennings		J McNeill	3:22.0		

== Earlier winners ==
- 1952 - Reformed
- 1951 - Almora
- 1951 - Prawns
- 1950 - Beaumaris
- 1949 - Royal Tan
- 1948 - Spare Part
- 1947 - Bruce
- 1946 - Golden Souvenir
- 1945 - Lambourn
- 1944 - Don Quex
- 1943 - The Joker
- 1941 - Kindergarten
- 1941 - Happy Ending
- 1940 - Old Bill
- 1939 - Defaulter
- 1938 - Padishah
- 1937 - Ponty
- 1936 - Queen of Song
- 1935 - Vintage
- 1934 - Grand Jury
- 1933 - Royal Artist
- 1932 - Compris
- 1931 - Stanchion
- 1930 - Concentrate
- 1929 - Vertigern
- 1928 - Star Stranger
- 1927 - Rapier
- 1926 - Enthusiasm
- 1925 - Surveyor
- 1924 - Loughrea
- 1923 - Rapine
- 1922 - Insurrection
- 1921 - Maioha
- 1920 - Kilmoon
- 1919 - Red Ribbon
- 1919 - Rewi Poto
- 1919 - Oratress
- 1918 - Nobleman
- 1917 - Bunting
- 1916 - Bee
- 1915 - Pavlova
- 1914 - Kilrain
- 1913 - Sir Solo
- 1912 - Undecided
- 1911 - Miss Mischief
- 1910 - Crucinella
- 1909 - Blue Ribbon
- 1908 - Moloch
- 1907 - Achilles
- 1906 - Ropa
- 1905 - Nightfall
- 1904 - Convoy
- 1903 - Advance
- 1902 - St. Michael
- 1901 - Renown
- 1900 - Djin Djin
- 1899 - Daunt
- 1898 - Uniform
- 1897 - Strath Braan
- 1896 - Brooklet
- 1895 - Mahaki
- 1894 - Vogengang
- 1893 - Retina
- 1892 - Cynisca
- 1891 - Cynisca
- 1890 - Cynisca
- 1889 - Dudu
- 1888 - Beresford
- 1887 - Pasha
- 1886 - Nelson
- 1885 - Tasman
- 1884 - The Poet
- 1883 - Mischief
- 1882 - Hilda
- 1881 - Natator
- 1880 - Foul Play
- 1879 - Maritana
- 1878 - Lara
- 1877 - Guy Fawkes
- 1876 - Korari
- 1875 - Tambourini
- 1874 - Castaway
- 1868 - Numa
- 1867 - Policy

== See also ==
- Recent winners of major NZ cup races
- Trentham Stakes
- New Zealand Cup
- Auckland Cup
- Thorndon Mile
- Desert Gold Stakes (raced on same day)
- Telegraph Handicap
- Captain Cook Stakes
