= Frances, Indiana =

Unincorporated community in Indiana, U.S.

Coordinates: 39°36′21″N 86°10′08″W

Frances is an unincorporated community in Johnson County, Indiana, in the United States.

According to one source, Frances was the name of wife of a railroad man.
