= Frances (horse) =

New Zealand-bred Thoroughbred racehorse

Frances was a New Zealand thoroughbred racemare foaled in 1942 by Bulandshar (GB) out of Trivet (NZ). She won the 1948 Auckland Cup.

== See also ==
- Thoroughbred racing in New Zealand
