= Kettlebaston =

Village in Suffolk, England

Coordinates: 52.115°N 0.868°E

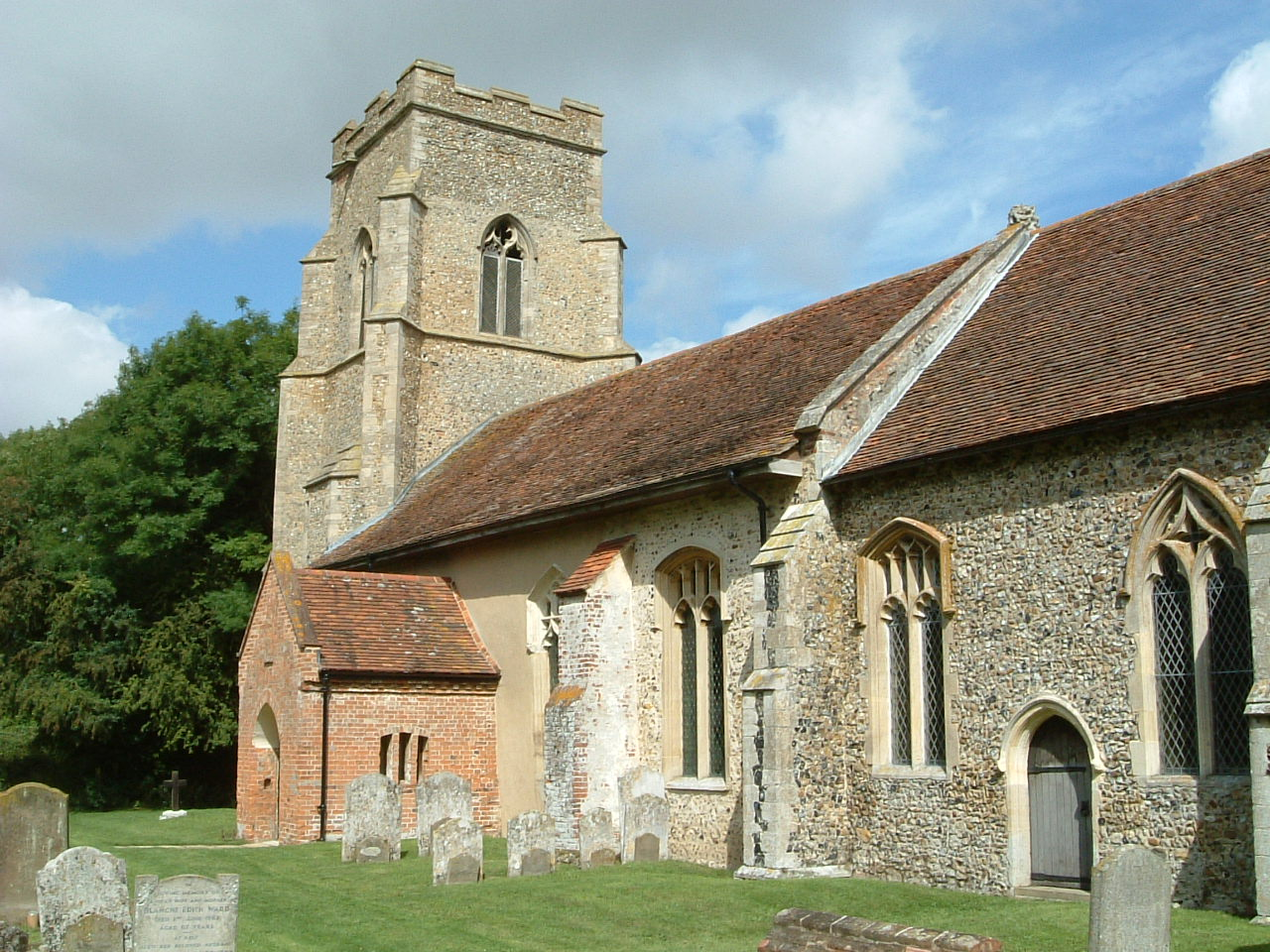
- Church of St Mary the Virgin, Kettlebaston

- Location within Suffolk
- OS grid reference: TL965502
- District: Babergh
- Shire county: Suffolk
- Region: East
- Country: England
- Sovereign state: United Kingdom
- Post town: IPSWICH
- Postcode district: IP7

Kettlebaston is a village and a civil parish with just over 30 inhabitants in the Babergh district of Suffolk, England, located around 3 miles (5 km) east of Lavenham. From the 2011 Census the population of the village was not maintained and is included in the civil parish of Chelsworth. It derives its name from Kitelbeornastuna, (Kitelbjorn's farmstead - O.Scand. pers. name + O.E. Tun), later evolving to Kettlebarston, (which is how the name is still pronounced), and finally to the current spelling. Its existence was first recorded in 1086 in the Domesday Book.

== History ==
Once in an area of great wealth, the demise of the mediaeval wool trade was indirectly the saving of the village, (as we know it today), since the locals were unable to afford the expense of upgrading their houses with the latest architectural fashions. The number of timber-framed houses slowly declined over the years, as did the population - from over 200 at its peak, to the point when the village was on the brink of extinction. By the 1960s, with the road no more than an unmade track, and no electricity or mains water supplies, (it still has no gas or main drains), Kettlebaston was barely standing. In the "Spotlight On The Suffolk Scene" article, of the Chronicle & Mercury in June 1949, it was noted that a great many houses were category five - derelict, and ready for demolition.

As the agricultural workers left the land in search of other jobs, due to the increased mechanisation of farm work, "outsiders" discovered the secluded beauty of the rural Suffolk countryside, and a new age dawned. The tiny workmen's cottages, which once housed huge families - and some stock and chickens according to local accounts - were lovingly renovated and converted, and the village was reborn, and went on to proudly win Babergh Best Kept Village, and runner up in the Suffolk Community Council Best Kept Village Competition, in 1989.

The village sign, bearing two crossed sceptres topped with doves, was erected to mark the coronation of King George VI and Queen Elizabeth. It also commemorates that, in 1445, Henry VI granted the manor of Kettlebaston to William de la Pole, 1st Marquess of Suffolk, in return for the service of carrying a golden sceptre at the coronation of all the future Kings of England, and an ivory sceptre to carry at the coronation of Margaret of Anjou, and all future Queens. This honour continued until Henry VIII resumed the manor, although it was later regranted it was without the royal service.

=== Parish church ===
The parish church of St Mary the Virgin has Norman origins, and features a font from around 1200. The building is listed as Grade I. It is recorded that the church was then "built anew" in 1342, remaining largely unchanged until targeted by Protestant iconoclasts in the 1540s. Today it features one of Suffolk's finest post-Reformation rood screens, designed by Father Ernest Geldart and decorated by Patrick Osborne, and Enid Chadwick, and a rare Sacred Heart altar upon a Stuart Holy Table. It now lacks the small lead spire which once topped the tower.

Church bells of St Mary's Kettlebaston
| Bell № | Weight | ate | Founder |
|---|---|---|---|
| Treble | 5cwt | 1636 | John Darbie of Ipswich |
| Two | 6cwt | 1699 | Henry Pleasant of Sudbury |
| Tenor | 9wt 2qr | 1567 | Stephen Tonni II of Bury St Edmunds |

Regarded as a place of pilgrimage to the followers of the Anglo-Catholic movement from all over the UK, Kettlebaston was the liturgically highest of all Suffolk's Anglican churches. From 1930, until his retirement in 1964, Reverend Father Harold Clear Butler said Roman Mass every day, and celebrated High Mass and Benediction on Sundays. He also removed state notices from the porch, and refused to keep registers, or to recognise the office of the local Archdeacon of Sudbury. Despite opposition, the church finally received electric heating and lighting in 2014.

== The village today ==
The current village has no shop, school, or pub.

== Notable residents ==
- Patrick Murdoch ( -1774); author, publisher and mathematician.
- Thomas Sherwood (1586-1665); colonist of Connecticut in the USA
