= Frances (1803 ship) =

British slave ship

History

United Kingdom
- Launched: East Indies
- In service: 1803
- Fate: Wrecked 17 January 1809

General characteristics
- Tons burthen: 159 (bm)
- Complement: 1803:32; 1805:23
- Armament: 1803:4 × 6-pounder cannons + 8 × 12-pounder carronades; 1805:14 × 12&6-pounder cannons; 1809:10 × 6-pounder guns + 6 × 12-pounder carronades

Frances (or Francis) was built in India or the East Indies circa 1795, possibly under another name, and entered British records in 1803. Between 1803 and 1807 she made three voyages as a slave ship in the triangular trade in enslaved persons. After the end of British participation in the slave trade in 1807, Frances started trading with Spain and the West Indies. She was wrecked in January 1809.

== Career ==
Frances first appeared in the volume of Lloyd's Register (LR) for 1804.

Year	Master	Owner	Trade	Source
1804	J.Soalar	Begg & Co.	Liverpool–Africa	LR

1st voyage transporting enslaved people (1803–1805): Captain James Souter acquired a letter of marque on 15 November 1803. He sailed from Liverpool on 9 December 1803. In 1803, 99 vessels left British ports on voyages to transport captives from West Africa to the Americas; 83 of these vessels sailed from Liverpool.

Frances acquired captives at Congo North and arrived first at Demerara and then at Charleston on 27 August 1804 with 185 captives. She sailed for Liverpool on 16 December 1804 and arrived there on 18 February 1805. She had left Liverpool with 32 crew members and suffered three crew deaths on her voyage.

2nd voyage transporting enslaved people (1805–1806): Captain John Laughton acquired a letter of marque on 12 July 1805. He sailed from Liverpool on 3 August 1805. Frances sailed from Africa on 1 November and arrived at Demerara on 24 December. She sailed from Demerara on 8 March 1806 and arrived back at Liverpool on 18 May. She had left Liverpool with 31 crew members and she suffered 11 crew deaths on her voyage.

Year	Master	Owner	Trade	Source & notes
1807	J.Soalar; W.Williams	Begg & Co.	Liverpool–Africa	LR; good repair 1807

3rd voyage transporting enslaved people (1807–1808): Captain William Williams sailed from Britain, probably Liverpool, on 29 March 1807. Between 1 January 1806 and 1 May 1807, 185 vessels cleared Liverpool outward bound in the slave trade. Thirty of these vessels made two voyages during this period. Of the 155 vessels, 114 were regular slave ships, having made two voyages during the period, or voyages before 1806.

Frances acquired captives at Loango. She arrived at Barbados on 13 February 1808 with 183 captives. She also stopped at Berbice and Trinidad. She arrived back at Liverpool on 20 September 1808. Frances had left Liverpool with 29 men and had suffered one crew death on her voyage.

There was a report that a French vessel had captured a Guineaman with 300 slaves aboard. The captured vessel was conjectured to have been Francis, of Liverpool, Williams, master. That part of the report was clearly in error.

Year	Master	Owner	Trade	Source & notes
1808	Williams; Paul	Begg & Co.	Liverpool–Spain	LR; good repair 1807

== Fate ==
On 17 January 1809 Francis, Paull, master, was driven on shore near Dublin. She had been sailing from Liverpool to Curacoa. Her crew deserted her.
