= USS Frances =

US Navy ship used in the War of 1812

History

United States
- Name: USS Frances
- Acquired: 1813
- Out of service: Returned to owner 1814

General characteristics
- Type: Sloop
- Propulsion: Sail
- Armament: 5 guns

Frances was a sloop used by the US Navy between 1813 and 1814. (Note: The civilian identity of this Frances is not confirmed. However, there was an eighty-foot iron-hulled sloop of that name built in 1809 by the Monkton Iron Works at Vergennes, Vermont to move iron ore and charcoal between there and Whitehall, New York.) She was hired by Commodore Thomas Macdonough for use on Lake Champlain. Outfitted with five guns, she was found to sail poorly, but served as an armed tender, probably carrying supplies. She was part of MacDonough's fleet at the Battle of Plattsburgh in the fall of 1814.

Frances was returned to her owner later in 1814.
