= McEwen Stakes =

McEwen Stakes (registered as Ian McEwen Trophy)
- Class: Group 2
- Location: Moonee Valley Racecourse, Melbourne, Australia
- Inaugurated: 1995
- Race type: Thoroughbred
- Sponsor: Cirka (2025 & 2026)

Race information
- Distance: 1,000 metres
- Surface: Turf
- Track: Left-handed
- Qualification: Three year old and older
- Weight: Weight for Age
- Purse: $300,000 (2026)

The McEwen Stakes, registered as the Ian McEwen Trophy, is a Moonee Valley Racing Club Group 2 Thoroughbred horse race for horses aged three years old and over at Weight for age, over a distance of 1000 metres at Moonee Valley Racecourse, Melbourne, Australia in September.

== History ==
The race was named in honour of former Moonee Valley Racing Club Secretary Ian McEwen.

=== Distance ===
- 1995 onwards held over 1000 metres

=== Grade ===
- 1995–1997 - Unlisted race
- 1997–2005 - Listed Race
- 2006–2012 - Group 3
- 2013 onwards - Group 2

=== Name ===
- 1995 - The Anniversary Trophy
- 1996–2005 - Ian McEwen Trophy
- 2006 onwards - McEwen Stakes

=== Venue ===
- 1995 - Caulfield Racecourse
- 2007 - Caulfield Racecourse
- 2026 - Flemington

== Winners ==
The following are past winners of the race.

- 2026 - Smooth Chino
- 2025 - Jigsaw
- 2024 - Baraqiel
- 2023 - Imperatriz
- 2022 - Rothfire
- 2021 - The Inferno
- 2020 - Bella Vella
- 2019 - Faatinah
- 2018 - Nature Strip
- 2017 - Russian Revolution
- 2016 - Wild Rain
- 2015 - Chautauqua
- 2014 - Angelic Light
- 2013 - Kuroshio
- 2012 - Bel Sprinter
- 2011 - Buffering
- 2010 - Hay List
- 2009 - Nicconi
- 2008 - Kaphero
- 2007 - Here De Angels
- 2006 - Miss Andretti
- 2005 - Strikeline
- 2004 - Edgeton
- 2003 - Yell
- 2002 - Mistegic
- 2001 - Strategic Image
- 2000 - Testa Rossa
- 1999 - Theatre
- 1998 - Flavour
- 1997 - Another Excuse
- 1996 - Red Hope
- 1995 - Sequalo

== See also ==
- Cox Plate
- Crystal Mile (Kia Ora Stud Mile)
- Moonee Valley Gold Cup
- Moonee Valley Vase (Drummond Golf Vase)
- Red Anchor Stakes
- Tesio Stakes
- List of Australian Group races
- Group races
