= Moonee Valley Fillies Classic =

Moonee Valley Fillies Classic raced as 3 Point Motors Fillies Classic
- Class: Group 2
- Location: Moonee Valley Racecourse, Melbourne, Australia
- Inaugurated: 1996
- Race type: Thoroughbred
- Sponsor: 3 Point Motors (2025)

Race information
- Distance: 1,600 metres
- Surface: Turf
- Track: Left-handed
- Qualification: Three years old fillies
- Weight: Set Weights
- Purse: $300,000 (2025)

The Moonee Valley Fillies Classic is a registered Moonee Valley Racing Club Group 2 Thoroughbred horse race for fillies aged three years old, at set weight conditions, over a distance of 1600 metres.

Until 2025 the race was held at Moonee Valley Racecourse in Melbourne, Australia on W. S. Cox Plate Day. It was not held in 2026 and from 2027 will revert to a March raceday.

== History ==
In 2012 the race was moved from March to October, hence the event was run twice in 2012. In 2013 the race was run on Friday night but moved back to Saturday for 2015.

In July 2026 the Moonee Valley Racing Club announced:

"The $300,000 G2 Fillies Classic has reverted to its inaugural distance of 2000 metres and back to the Autumn, when it was traditionally known as the Moonee Valley Oaks. To be conducted at Caulfield on William Reid Stakes Day on March 20, the race has produced winners such as Sunline, Champagne and Kensington Palace."

=== Name ===
- 1998–2004 - Moonee Valley Oaks
- 2005 - Woodstock Mile
- 2006 - Woodstock Classic
- 2007 - Hollylodge Classic
- 2008 - Thoroughbred Classic
- 2009, 2011–2012 - Sportingbet Fillies Classic
- 2010 - Mooney Valley Fillies Classic
- 2013 - Jeep Fillies Classic
- 2014 - Drummond Golf Fillies Classic
- 2015 - Alliance Broking Services Fillies Classic
- 2016 - P.W. Glass Fillies Classic
- 2017 - italktravel Fillies Classic
- 2018 - Aquis Farm Fillies Classic
- 2019 - Antler Luggage Fillies Classic

=== Distance ===
- 1998–2004 - 2040 metres
- 2005 - 1600 metres
- 2006–2009 - 1500 metres
- 2010–2025 - 1600 metres
- 2027 onwards - 2000 metres

=== Grade ===
- 1998 - Listed Race
- 1999–2000 - Group 3
- 2001 onwards - Group 2

== Winners ==
The following are past winners of the race.

- 2026 - Race not held
- 2025 - Salty Pearl
- 2024 - Double Market
- 2023 - Skybird
- 2022 - Zoe's Promise
- 2021 - Mokulua
- 2020 - Yes Baby Yes
- 2019 - La Falaise
- 2018 - Mystic Journey
- 2017 - Banish
- 2016 - Nurse Kitchen
- 2015 - My Poppette
- 2014 - Lumosty
- 2013 - Gypsy Diamond
- 2012 (Oct.) - Kazanluk
- 2012 (Mar.) - Empress Rock
- 2011 - Lights Of Heaven
- 2010 - My Emotion
- 2009 - Romneya
- 2008 - Absolut Glam
- 2007 - Anamato
- 2006 - Pure Harmony
- 2005 - Dizelle
- 2004 - Special Harmony
- 2003 - Ribe
- 2002 - Elegant Fashion
- 2001 - Dandify
- 2000 - Hill of Grace
- 1999 - Sunline
- 1998 - † Kensington Palace / Champagne
- 1997 - Star Cossack
- 1996 - Just A Runner

† Dead heat

== See also ==
- Cox Plate
- Moonee Valley Gold Cup
- William Reid Stakes
- List of Australian Group races
- Group races
