= Crystal Mile =

- Class: Group 2
- Location: Moonee Valley Racecourse, Melbourne
- Inaugurated: 1982
- Race type: Thoroughbred
- Sponsor: Kia Ora Stud (2026)

Race information
- Distance: 1,600 metres
- Surface: Turf
- Track: Left-handed
- Qualification: Three years old and over
- Weight: Weight for Age
- Purse: $400,000 (2026)

The Crystal Mile is a Moonee Valley Racing Club Group 2 Thoroughbred horse race held under Weight for Age conditions for horses aged three years old and upwards, over a distance of 1600 metres held at Moonee Valley Racecourse, Melbourne, Australia in late October on W. S. Cox Plate Day.

== History ==
=== Distance ===
- 1982 - 1600 metres

=== Grade ===
- 1982–1985 - Listed race
- 1986–1996 - Group 3
- 1997 onwards - Group 2

In 2012 the race conditions changed from handicap to Weight for Age.

=== Name ===
- 1982–2006 - Waterford Crystal Mile
- 2007–2011 - Jayco Crystal Mile
- 2012–2022 - Schweppes Crystal Mile
- 2023 - McCafe Crystal Mile
- 2024–2025 - Alinta Energy Crystal Mile
- 2026 - Kia Ora Stud Mile

=== Other venues ===
- 2026 - Flemington

== Winners ==
The following are past winners of the race.

- 2026 - Surfin' Bird
- 2025 - Von Hauke
- 2024 - Plenty Of Ammo
- 2023 - Prowess
- 2022 - My Oberon
- 2021 - Just Folk
- 2020 - Homesman
- 2019 - Chief Ironside
- 2018 - Cliff's Edge
- 2017 - Lucky Hussler
- 2016 - The United States
- 2015 - Turn Me Loose
- 2014 - Hooked
- 2013 - Toydini
- 2012 - Silent Achiever
- 2011 - Testa My Patience
- 2010 - Sound Journey
- 2009 - Rangirangdoo
- 2008 - Sea Battle
- 2007 - Sonic Quest
- 2006 - Flash Trick
- 2005 - Niconero
- 2004 - Lad Of The Manor
- 2003 - Rosina Lad
- 2002 - Royal Code
- 2001 - Weasel Will
- 2000 - Weasel Will
- 1999 - Le Zagaletta
- 1998 - Rustic Dream
- 1997 - Holy Roller
- 1996 - Lochrae
- 1995 - Juggler
- 1994 - State Taj
- 1993 - Carson's Cash
- 1992 - Solvit
- 1991 - Fire Commander
- 1990 - Ark Regal
- 1989 - Fendalton
- 1988 - True Dreams
- 1987 - Tierra Rist
- 1986 - Splendid Speed
- 1985 - Dazzling Duke
- 1984 - Keepers
- 1983 - Dynamo
- 1982 - Getting Closer

== See also ==
- Cox Plate
- Moonee Valley Gold Cup
- Moonee Valley Vase (Drummond Golf Vase)
- McEwen Stakes
- Red Anchor Stakes
- Tesio Stakes
- List of Australian Group races
- Group races
