= Moonee Valley Vase =

Moonee Valley Vase raced as Drummond Golf Vase
- Class: Group 2
- Location: Moonee Valley Racecourse, Melbourne
- Inaugurated: 1983
- Race type: Thoroughbred
- Sponsor: Drummond Golf (2026)

Race information
- Distance: 2,040 metres
- Surface: Turf
- Track: Left-handed
- Qualification: Three years old
- Weight: Set Weights colts and geldings – 57 kg fillies – 55 kg
- Purse: $400,000 (2026)

The Moonee Valley Vase is a registered Moonee Valley Racing Club Group 2 Thoroughbred horse race held under Set Weights conditions, for horses aged three-years-old, over a distance of 2040 metres. It is held at Moonee Valley Racecourse in Melbourne, Australia on W. S. Cox Plate Day.

== History ==
The event is considered to be a major preparation race for the Group 1 Victoria Derby, the premier race for three-year-olds during the Melbourne Cup carnival.

=== Name ===
- 1983–1989 - The Herald Vase
- 1990 - Herald Sun Vase
- 1991–1992 - BMW Vase
- 1993–2011 - AAMI Vase
- 2012–2013 - Mitchelton Wines Vase
- 2014–2015 - Dilmah Exceptional Teas Vase
- 2016 - LUCRF Super Vase
- 2017 onwards - Drummond Golf Vase

=== Distance ===
- 1983–1985 - 1600 metres
- 1986 onwards - 2040 metres

=== Grade ===
- 1983–1988 - Listed race
- 1989–1996 - Group 3 race
- 1997 onwards - Group 2 race

=== Other venues ===
- 2026 - Flemington

=== Double winners ===
The following thoroughbreds have won the Moonee Valley Vase – Victoria Derby double.

- Observer (2025), Efficient (2006), Plastered (2004), Helenus (2002), Blevic (1994) and Raveneaux (1986)

The following thoroughbreds have won the Moonee Valley Vase – VRC Oaks double.

- Jameka (2015)

== Winners ==
The following are past winners of the race.

- 2026 - True Rebel
- 2025 - Observer
- 2024 - Red Aces
- 2023 - Apulia
- 2022 - Berkeley Square
- 2021 - Forgot You
- 2020 - Cherry Tortoni
- 2019 - Soul Patch
- 2018 - Stars of Carrum
- 2017 - Aloisia
- 2016 - Sacred Elixir
- 2015 - Jameka
- 2014 - Moonovermanhattan
- 2013 - Savvy Nature
- 2012 - Super Cool
- 2011 - Manawanui
- 2010 - Rekindled Interest
- 2009 - Hanks
- 2008 - Whobegotyou
- 2007 - Marching
- 2006 - Efficient
- 2005 - Duelled
- 2004 - Plastered
- 2003 - Kempinsky
- 2002 - Helenus
- 2001 - Ustinov
- 2000 - Skalato
- 1999 - Diatribe
- 1998 - Mossman
- 1997 - Gold Guru
- 1996 - Alfa
- 1995 - Donar
- 1994 - Blevic
- 1993 - Zaremba
- 1992 - Kenny's Best Pal
- 1991 - Naturalism
- 1990 - Rockets Galore
- 1989 - Zamoff
- 1988 - Big Grey Roo
- 1987 - Crush
- 1986 - Raveneaux
- 1985 - Caledonian Boy
- 1984 - Brash Son
- 1983 - Centaine

== See also ==
- Crystal Mile (Kia Ora Stud Mile)
- Moonee Valley Gold Cup
- McEwen Stakes
- Red Anchor Stakes
- Tesio Stakes
- List of Australian Group races
- Group races
