= HKJC World Pool Red Anchor Stakes =

Red Anchor Stakes
- Class: Group 3
- Location: Moonee Valley Racecourse, Melbourne
- Inaugurated: 1985
- Race type: Thoroughbred
- Sponsor: HKJC World Pool (2026)

Race information
- Distance: 1,200 metres
- Surface: Turf
- Track: Left-handed
- Qualification: Three years old
- Weight: Set Weights with penalties
- Purse: $240,000 (2026)

The Red Anchor Stakes, is a Moonee Valley Racing Club Group 3 Australian Thoroughbred horse race for horses aged three years old, at set weights with penalties, over a distance of 1200 metres, held at Moonee Valley Racecourse, Melbourne, Australia on W. S. Cox Plate Day.

== History ==
In 1995 the race was held at Caulfield Racecourse. Prior to 2005 the race was run in September when it was known as the C S Hayes Stakes, named after the champion trainer Colin S. Hayes (1924–1999).

The registered race is named after the champion Australian Horse of the Year in 1984–85, Red Anchor, who won the W. S. Cox Plate–Victoria Derby in that year.

=== Distance ===
- 1985 onwards - 1200 metres

=== Grade ===
- 1985–1989 - Listed Race
- 1990 onwards - Group 3

=== Name ===
- 1985–1989 - Red Anchor Stakes
- 1990–2004 - C S Hayes Stakes
- 2005–2007 - City Pacific Finance Stakes
- 2008 - Wonderful World Stakes
- 2009 - Red Anchor Stakes
- 2010–2011 - 1300 Australia Stakes
- 2012–2019 - Telstra Phonewords Stakes
- 2020 onwards - Red Anchor Stakes

=== Other venue ===
- 2026 - Flemington

== Winners ==
The following are past winners of the race.

- 2026 - Buggsy
- 2025 - Napoleonic
- 2024 - Bittercreek
- 2023 - Magic Control
- 2022 - Sejardan
- 2021 - Generation
- 2020 - Portland Sky
- 2019 - Sartorial Splendor
- 2018 - Charge
- 2017 - Eptimum
- 2016 - Archives
- 2015 - Holler
- 2014 - Galaxy Pegasus
- 2013 - Thermal Current
- 2012 - Hidden Warrior
- 2011 - Karuta Queen
- 2010 - That's Not It
- 2009 - Avenue
- 2008 - Millbank
- 2007 - Royal Asscher
- 2006 - Corton Charlemagne
- 2005 - Coronga
- 2004 - Oratorio
- 2003 - Youth
- 2002 - Yell
- 2001 - Deprave
- 2000 - Sound The Alarm
- 1999 - Prizefighter
- 1998 - Sedation
- 1997 - Towkay
- 1996 - Spartacus
- 1995 - Captive
- 1994 - Cannibal King
- 1993 - Sequalo
- 1992 - Snow Lord
- 1991 - Hula Grey
- 1990 - Begone
- 1989 - Hot Arch
- 1988 - Clay Hero
- 1987 - Christmas Tree
- 1986 - Rubiton
- 1985 - Seiger

== See also ==
- Cox Plate
- Crystal Mile (Kia Ora Stud Mile)
- Moonee Valley Gold Cup
- Moonee Valley Vase (Drummond Golf Vase)
- McEwen Stakes
- Tesio Stakes
- List of Australian Group races
- Group races
