= Tesio Stakes =

Thoroughbred horse race

Tesio Stakes raced as Powerflo Solutions Tesio Stakes
- Class: Group 3
- Location: Moonee Valley Racecourse, Melbourne
- Inaugurated: 1988
- Race type: Thoroughbred
- Sponsor: Powerflo Solutions (2017-26)

Race information
- Distance: 2,040 metres
- Surface: Turf
- Track: Left-handed
- Qualification: Mares four years old and over
- Weight: Handicap
- Purse: $300,000 (2026)

The Tesio Stakes, is a registered Moonee Valley Racing Club Thoroughbred horse race recently run for commercial reasons as the Powerflo Solutions Tesio Stakes (2021). It is a Group 3 event for mares aged four years old and upwards under handicap conditions, over a distance of 2040 metres held annually at Moonee Valley Racecourse, Melbourne, Australia in late October on W. S. Cox Plate Day.

== History ==
The race's registered name is in honour of the famous Italian horse breeder Federico Tesio (1869–1954). The sponsors of the race are usually associated with breeding and the selling of thoroughbreds since the race is for mares. Race names such as Inglis and Dalgety indicate such a trend.

From 2012–14 the race name was named after Eliza Park International, a stud farm associated with the world champion racehorse, Black Caviar: standing her sire, Bel Esprit, bred her mother, Helsinge, and stood her damsire, Desert Sun.

=== Distance ===
- 1990–2023 - 1600 metres
- 2024 onwards - 2,040 metres

=== Grade ===
- 1990–1993 - Listed race
- 1994 onwards - Group 3

=== Name ===
- 1990 - BMW Australia Stakes
- 1991–1992 - Dalgety Breeders’ Plate
- 1993 - BMW Plate
- 1994–2004 - Tesio Stakes
- 2005–2008 - Inglis Mile
- 2009 - Independent Cranes Stakes
- 2010 - Tesio Stakes
- 2011 - Trojan Hand Tools Stakes
- 2012 - Tesio Stakes
- 2013–2014 - Eliza Park International Stakes
- 2015 - G1X.com.au Stakes
- 2016 - Merlin Garage Door Openers Stakes
- 2017–2020 - Powerflo Solutions Stakes
- 2021 onwards - Powerflo Solutions Tesio Stakes

=== Other Venues ===
- 2026 - Flemington

== Winners ==
The following are past winners of the race.

- 2026 - Soverato
- 2025 - She's A Hustler
- 2024 - Lady Jones
- 2023 - Wishlor Lass
- 2022 - My Whisper
- 2021 - Flying Mascot
- 2021 - Sovereign Award
- 2019 - Amangiri
- 2018 - Shoko
- 2017 - Lubiton
- 2016 - Kaniana
- 2015 - Coronation Shallan
- 2014 - Suavito
- 2013 - Catkins
- 2012 - Star Of Giselle
- 2011 - Ocean Challenger
- 2010 - Lady Lynette
- 2009 - Lady Lynette
- 2008 - † Miss Badoura / Bird Of Fire
- 2007 - † Maslins Beach / Autumn Jeuney
- 2006 - Valkyrie Diva
- 2005 - Matras
- 2004 - Joy Of Flight
- 2003 - Zanna
- 2002 - Gentle Genius
- 2001 - La Bella Damma
- 2000 - Oregon Steel
- 1999 - Zatella
- 1998 - Our Bellition
- 1997 - Spectrum
- 1996 - Miss Margaret
- 1995 - Our Marquise
- 1994 - Centisle
- 1993 - Mingling Glances
- 1992 - Bold Alliance
- 1991 - Western Chorus
- 1990 - Princess Pushy

† Dead heat

== See also ==
- Cox Plate
- Crystal Mile (Kia Ora Stud Mile)
- Moonee Valley Gold Cup
- Moonee Valley Vase (Drummond Golf Vase)
- McEwen Stakes
- Red Anchor Stakes
- List of Australian Group races
- Group races
