= Moonee Valley =

Moonee Valley may refer to:

- City of Moonee Valley
- Moonee Valley Football Club
- Moonee Valley Racing Club
- Moonee Valley Racecourse
