= Mystic Journey (horse) =

Australian Thoroughbred racehorse

- Sire: Needs Further
- Grandsire: Encosta De Lago
- Dam: White Gold
- Damsire: Colombia
- Sex: Mare
- Foaled: 2015
- Country: Australia
- Colour: dark bay
- Breeder: RA Zito
- Owner: WG Roser
- Trainer: Adam Trinder
- Record: 26: 12–4–0
- Earnings: A$ 3,975,100

Major wins
- Moonee Valley Fillies Classic (2018); Australian Guineas (2019); P B Lawrence Stakes (2019); W H Stocks Stakes (2020)

Awards
- 2018/19 Tasmanian Horse of the Year

Mystic Journey (foaled 26 September 2015) is a Group 1 winning Australian thoroughbred racehorse and broodmare.

== Background ==
Mystic Journey was sold for A$11,000 at the 2017 Tasmanian Magic Millions yearling sale.

== Racing career ==
Mystic Journey commenced her career as a 2 year old winning her first three race starts, culminating with victory in the Elwick Stakes which took place at Tasmania’s Elwick Racecourse.

Mystic Journey tasted success as the 3/1 favourite in the Group 1 Australian Guineas at Flemington Racecourse.

In winning the Australian Guineas the filly became the first Tasmanian-prepared horse to win a Group 1 equivalent since Malua (St Albans {GB}), who won the 1886 Australian Cup.

Two weeks later Mystic Journey was the inaugural winner of the All-Star Mile, collecting A$ 2,250,000 as first prizemoney.

As a 4YO mare Mystic Journey returned to Melbourne in the Spring of 2019 winning the Group 2 PB Lawrence Stakes at Caulfield Racecourse, before placing 2nd in the Group 1 Makybe Diva and running a gallant 5th in the Cox Plate behind Japanese superstar Lys Gracieux (JPN).

== Breeding career ==
At the conclusion of her racing career, Mystic Journey was sold to Japanese owners as a broodmare for an undisclosed sum.

== Pedigree ==
Pedigree of Mystic Journey (AUS) 2015
Sire Needs Further (AUS) 2007	Encosta De Lago (USA); 1993	Fairy King	Northern Dancer
Sire Needs Further (AUS) 2007	Encosta De Lago (USA); 1993	Fairy King	Fairy Bridge
Sire Needs Further (AUS) 2007	Encosta De Lago (USA); 1993	Shoal Creek	Star Way
Sire Needs Further (AUS) 2007	Encosta De Lago (USA); 1993	Shoal Creek	Rolls
Sire Needs Further (AUS) 2007	Crowned Glory (AUS); 1997	Danehill	Danzig
Sire Needs Further (AUS) 2007	Crowned Glory (AUS); 1997	Danehill	Razyana
Sire Needs Further (AUS) 2007	Crowned Glory (AUS); 1997	Significant Moment	Bletchingly
Sire Needs Further (AUS) 2007	Crowned Glory (AUS); 1997	Significant Moment	Lady Giselle
Dam White Gold (NZ) 2002	Colombia (NZ); 1996	Zabeel	Sir Tristram
Dam White Gold (NZ) 2002	Colombia (NZ); 1996	Zabeel	Lady Giselle
Dam White Gold (NZ) 2002	Colombia (NZ); 1996	Eight Carat	Pieces Of Eight
Dam White Gold (NZ) 2002	Colombia (NZ); 1996	Eight Carat	Klairessa
Dam White Gold (NZ) 2002	Lanello (NZ); 1999	Groom Dancer	Blushing Dragon
Dam White Gold (NZ) 2002	Lanello (NZ); 1999	Groom Dancer	Featherhill
Dam White Gold (NZ) 2002	Lanello (NZ); 1999	Scotch Pebble	Lomond
Dam White Gold (NZ) 2002	Lanello (NZ); 1999	Scotch Pebble	L'Anno D'Oro
