= Holy Roller (horse) =

Australian-bred Thoroughbred racehorse

- Sire: Sanction
- Grandsire: Biscay (horse)
- Dam: Secret Blessing
- Damsire: Imperial Prince
- Sex: Gelding
- Foaled: November 18, 1992
- Country: Australia
- Colour: Bay
- Breeder: Woodlands Stud
- Owner: Woodlands Stud
- Record: 26: 12-5-1
- Earnings: AU$320,865

Major wins
- Crystal Mile

Holy Roller (foaled 18 November 1992) was an Australian Thoroughbred racehorse in the mid-to late 1990s. He won 12 of his 25 races. Bred and owned by Woodlands Stud, Holy Roller stood at 18.1 hands, compared to the average Thoroughbred of 16 hands. His major wins include the Crystal Mile.

Holy Roller was born at Woodlands Stud in Denman, New South Wales, where it took his dam over one hour to give birth. When the foal stood, he reached the mid-chest level of a 6-foot man.

His dam, Secret Blessing, was an average-sized but wide mare, standing at about 16 hands. Most of her progeny were large; her children were wide like her, such as Genuflect, Immense, and Holy Roller. Holly Roller's sire, Sanction, stood at about 16.1 hands. Holy Roller was weaned off his dam in April 1993. He was taller than the Clydesdale foal that shared the paddock.

Woodlands Stud does not sell its yearlings, but races everything it breeds; Trevor Lobb, the general manager, and the trainer, John Hawkes, assess the youngsters in November and divide them into the appropriate groups for breaking. Holy Roller shares a name with the evangelical preachers of the southern United States, commonly known as "holy rollers". He was left until the last batch of yearlings for breaking and didn't go to Belmont Park until May 1994. Holy Roller was gelded at an early age to try to slow down his rapid growth pattern, but it did not work.

Holy Roller didn't start racing until he was 3 years old. He won at Canterbury and Moonee Valley. At breaking, Holy Roller measured 17 hands and weighed an estimated 660 kg. After his fourth start, he was sent away to further mature and grow. Upon his return he measured 18.1 hands.

During races, jockeys were often unable to see in front of Holy Roller's neck and head and would have to trust to the horse to get around and past smaller horses safely.

Standard steel shoes are about 8 inches in length, but the Holy Roller needed 14 inches per hoof, meaning the farrier had to start with a straight steel bar.

Upon his retirement, his owners John and Bob Ingham donated Holy Roller to Rod Hoare, a New South Wales equine veterinarian, who was looking for a big horse to compete in dressage and eventing.
