= Suavito =

New Zealand-bred Thoroughbred racehorse

- Sire: Thorn Park
- Grandsire: Spinning World (USA)
- Dam: Queen Cha Cha
- Damsire: High Chaparral (IRE)
- Sex: Mare
- Foaled: 21 August 2010
- Country: New Zealand
- Colour: Bay
- Breeder: IDL Racing Ltd
- Trainer: Nigel Blackiston
- Record: 24: 8-4-4
- Earnings: A$1,303,550

Major wins
- C F Orr Stakes (G1)(2016); Futurity Stakes (MRC) (G1)(2015); Blamey Stakes (G2)(2015); Matriarch Stakes (VRC) (G2)(2014); Tesio Stakes (G3)(2014)
- Last updated on 14 September 2016

Suavito (foaled 21/08/2010) is a retired Thoroughbred racehorse formally trained by Nigel Blackiston at Flemington Racecourse. She was bred in New Zealand by IDL Racing Ltd, and was raced throughout her entire career in Australia. She was a multiple group winner and won over $1,000,000 in prize money.

== Career ==
Suavito kicked off her career in a 3 year old maiden race at Ballarat over 1100m where she finished second to Solicit, a horse that went on to be a multiple group winning horse. Early in her career it was clear how talented she was, winning her second start, and going on to dominantly win her first city race at Caulfield Racecourse at just her 4th career start.

In her second preparation, in autumn 2014, Suavito placed first-up at Group 2 level. She went on the finish a close second to Marianne in the Listed Alexandra Stakes at Moonee Valley, followed by 7th and 6th placings in the Group 1 Vinery Stud Stakes and ATC (Australian Turf Club) Oaks respectively.

In her third preparation, spring 2014, Suavito kicked off with a win first-up over 1400m at Caulfield, displaying a great turn of foot. Weeks later, she controversially remained in the barriers at Flemington in the Group 2 Blazer Stakes. After this mishap, Suavito went on to win her first Black-type race in the Group 3 F&M Tesio Stakes at Moonee Valley. Two weeks later, on Emirates Stakes Day, Suavito won the Group 2 F&M Matriarch Stakes at Flemington.

After finishing her 2014 spring campaign with two wins in a row, Suavito started her third preparation in great form, defeating Smokin' Joey and Dissident (The 2014/2015 Horse Of The Year) first up over 1400m at Caulfield in the Group 1 Futurity Stakes. She soon made it 4 wins in a row after winning the Group 2 Blamey Stakes in dominant fashion. Her preparation finished after just three starts, with a 7th placing in the Group 1 Doncaster Mile over 1600m at Royal Randwick.

In Spring 2015, Suavito suffered a minor bone chip injury, which required surgery, this would mean she would miss the 2015 Spring Carnival, in arguably the best form of her career.

After a 45-week spell, including the surgery and recovery of her bone chip injury, Suavito returned in autumn 2016, running in the C F Orr Stakes at Caulfield over 1400m in what was at the time, a very strong Group 1 field. Suavito went on to improve her 1400m/Caulfield record, winning the Orr Stakes against group 1 winners Lucky Hussler, Hucklebuck, Turn Me Loose, Fawkner and many other notable runners. 2 weeks later, Suavito backed up her Orr Stakes win with a 3rd placing in the 2016 Futurity Stakes, finishing behind Turn Me Loose and Stratum Star. After her first up win in the Orr Stakes, Suavito was invited to run in the HKJC Champions Mile held in May, but unfortunately, due to a drop in form she was forced to have a break after unplaced efforts in the Australian Cup and Queen of the Turf Stakes.

In Spring 2016, Suavito only ran two starts, a 6th placing in the P B Lawrence Stakes behind Miss Rose Delago, and a 10th placing, in what would be her last career start at Moonee Valley in the Dato' Tan Chin Nam Stakes, behind Awesome Rock.

== Retirement ==
In spring 2016, Suavito was sold to Waikato Stud in New Zealand, and is to be served by Savabeel this coming season.

== Career wins and placings ==
Date	Race	Venue	Placing	Winner	2nd	3rd	Jockey	Margin
27/02/16	Futurity Stakes (Group 1) 1400m	Caulfield	3-11	Turn Me Loose	Stratum Star	Suavito	Luke Currie	1.2L
13/02/16	C.F. Orr Stakes (Group 1) 1400m	Caulfield	1-18	Suavito	Lucky Hussler	Hucklebuck	Luke Currie	0.8L
14/03/15	Blamey Stakes (Group 2) 1600m	Flemington	1-9	Suavito	Sertorius	Kourkam	Damien Oliver	1L
28/02/15	Futurity Stakes (Group 1) 1400m	Caulfield	1-8	Suavito	Smokin' Joey	Dissident	Damien Oliver	1.2L
08/11/14	Matriarch Stakes (Group 2) 2000m	Flemington	1-15	Suavito	Girl In Flight	Amanpour	Damien Oliver	0.1L
25/10/15	Tesio Stakes (Group 3) 1600m	Moonee Valley	1-12	Suavito	Precious Gem	You're So Good	Damien Oliver	1.2L
15/10/14	Ladies Day Vase (Group 3) 1600m	Caulfield	3-16	Star Fashion	Lady Cumquat	Suavito	Damien Oliver	1.5L
20/09/14	Mares BM90 1400m	Caulfield	2-15	Star Fashion	Suavito	Nadeem Lass	James Winks	0.1L
30/08/14	Mares Handicap 1400m	Caulfield	1-9	Suavito	Lorna May	Winta Chiller	Damien Oliver	0.1L
21/03/14	Alexandra Stakes (Listed) 1600m	Moonee Valley	2-9	Marianne	Suavito	Girl In Flight	Damien Oliver	0.1L
08/03/14	Kewney Stakes (Group 2) 1400m	Flemington	3-13	Solicit	Marianne	Suavito	Damien Oliver	1.1L
09/11/13	Hilton Hotel Stakes (Listed) 1400m	Flemington	2-10	Dothraki	Suavito	Consorting	James Winks	0.2L
19/10/13	3 Year Old Fillies Handicap 1400m	Caulfield	1-10	Suavito	Roop All	Patricia Dawn	Michael Walker	2L
29/09/13	3 Year Old Fillies Handicap 1400m	Caulfield	3-7	May's Dream	Bulbula	Suavito	Michael Walker	3L
12/09/13	3 Year Old Fillies Maiden 1200m	Ballarat	1-12	Suavito	Held Hostage	Street Allure	James Winks	0.8L
01/09/13	3 Year Old Fillies Maiden 1100m	Ballarat	2-11	Solicit	Suavito	Street Allure	Chad Schofield	0.8L
