= Red Anchor =

New Zealand-bred Thoroughbred racehorse

- Sire: Sea Anchor
- Grandsire: Alcide
- Dam: Decoy Girl
- Damsire: Decoy Boy
- Sex: Stallion
- Foaled: 31 August 1981
- Died: 10 April 2001 (aged 19)
- Country: New Zealand
- Colour: Chestnut
- Breeder: Peter Setchell
- Owner: J & J Gigante, JJ & JA Symond, AR Hely
- Trainer: Paul Sutherland; T J Smith
- Jockey: Mick Dittman
- Record: 14: 9-4-1
- Earnings: A$773,880

Major wins
- Champagne Stakes (1984); W. S. Cox Plate (1984); Caulfield Guineas (1984); Victoria Derby (1984); Moonee Valley Stakes (1984); QTC Sires Produce Stakes (1984); Apollo Stakes (1985)

Awards
- Australian Champion Racehorse of the Year (1985)

Honours
- Australian Racing Hall of Fame; Red Anchor Stakes

Red Anchor was a New Zealand-bred Thoroughbred racehorse who raced in Australia. In the 1984 Spring Racing Carnival he won the Caulfield Guineas, W. S. Cox Plate and the Victoria Derby. In 2021 he was inducted into the Australian Racing Hall of Fame.

== Background ==
A chestnut son of Sea Anchor (IRE) from the mare Decoy Girl (GB) by Decoy Boy, he was foaled in 1981 in New Zealand and was trained by trainer Tommy Smith after originally being trained by Paul Sutherland.

== Racing career ==
Amongst his major wins were the 1984 MVRC W. S. Cox Plate, 1984 VRC Victoria Derby and the 1984 VATC Caulfield Guineas. In 1985 he was awarded the Australian Horse of the Year award. His promising career was cut short by injury and he was retired from racing during his three-year-old season.

== Stud record ==
Sent to stud following his short racing career he had modest success siring five stakeswinners with seven stakeswins, including Navy Seal winner of the 1994 AJC Epsom Handicap. Red Anchor was euthanized on 10 April 2001 after fracturing a front leg.
