= Moonee Valley Gold Cup =

Moonee Valley Racing Club Group 2 Thoroughbred horse race

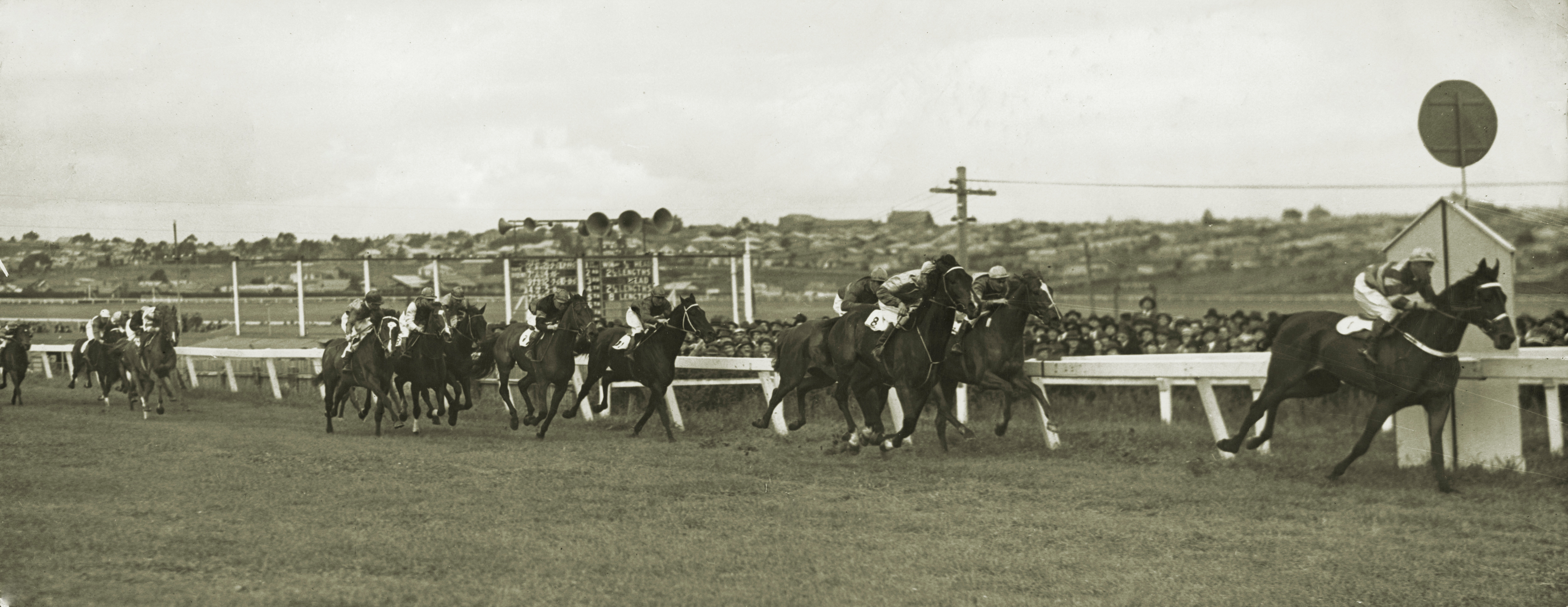
- Nightly, 1934 winner
- Class: Group 2
- Location: Moonee Valley Racecourse, Melbourne, Australia
- Inaugurated: 1883
- Race type: Thoroughbred
- Sponsor: Ladbrokes (2024-26)

Race information
- Distance: 2,500 metres
- Surface: Turf
- Track: Left-handed
- Qualification: Four years old and over
- Weight: Set Weights with penalties
- Purse: $750,000 (2026)

The Moonee Valley Gold Cup is a registered Moonee Valley Racing Club Group 2 Thoroughbred horse race for horses aged four-years-old and upwards under Set Weights with penalties conditions, over a distance of 2,500 metres, held annually at Moonee Valley Racecourse, Melbourne, Australia in late October on the Friday before W. S. Cox Plate Day.

== History ==
The event is the last major long-distance event to be run before the Melbourne Cup. Kingston Rule was the only horse to win the Melbourne Cup after winning the Moonee Valley Cup in the same year (1990). The Moonee Valley Cup has seen several double winners, such as Little Bob in 1891 & 1892, Gladwyn in 1914 and 1915, Gilltown in 1939 and 1940, Valcurl in 1945 and 1946 and Precedence in 2010 and 2013. It is Australia's oldest group 2 horse race.

In 2026 the Cup was raced at Flemington on the same day as the Cox Plate.

=== 1948 racebook ===
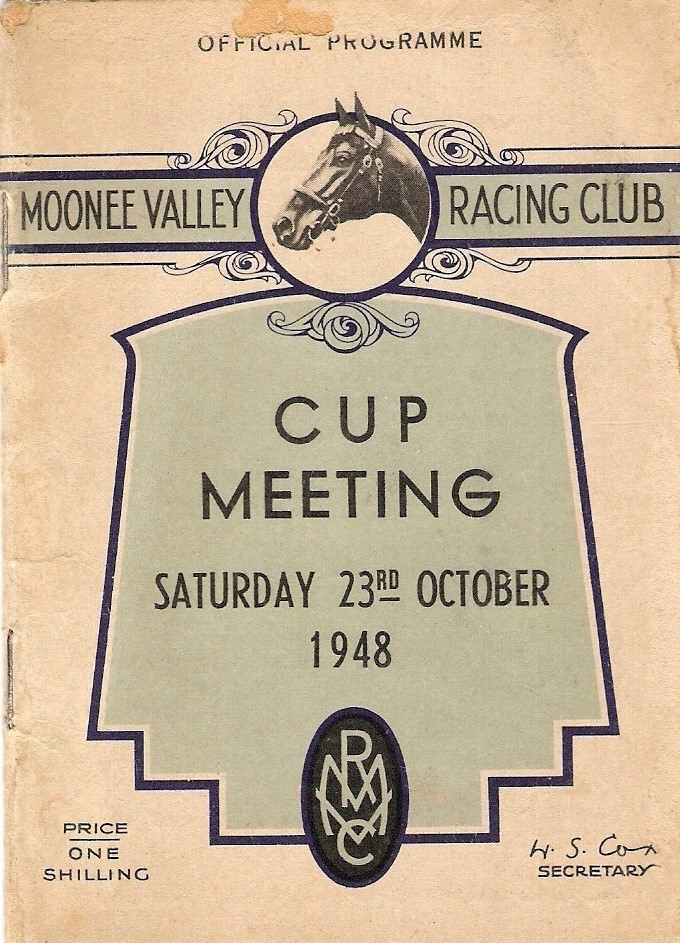
1948 Moonee Valley Cup racebook front cover

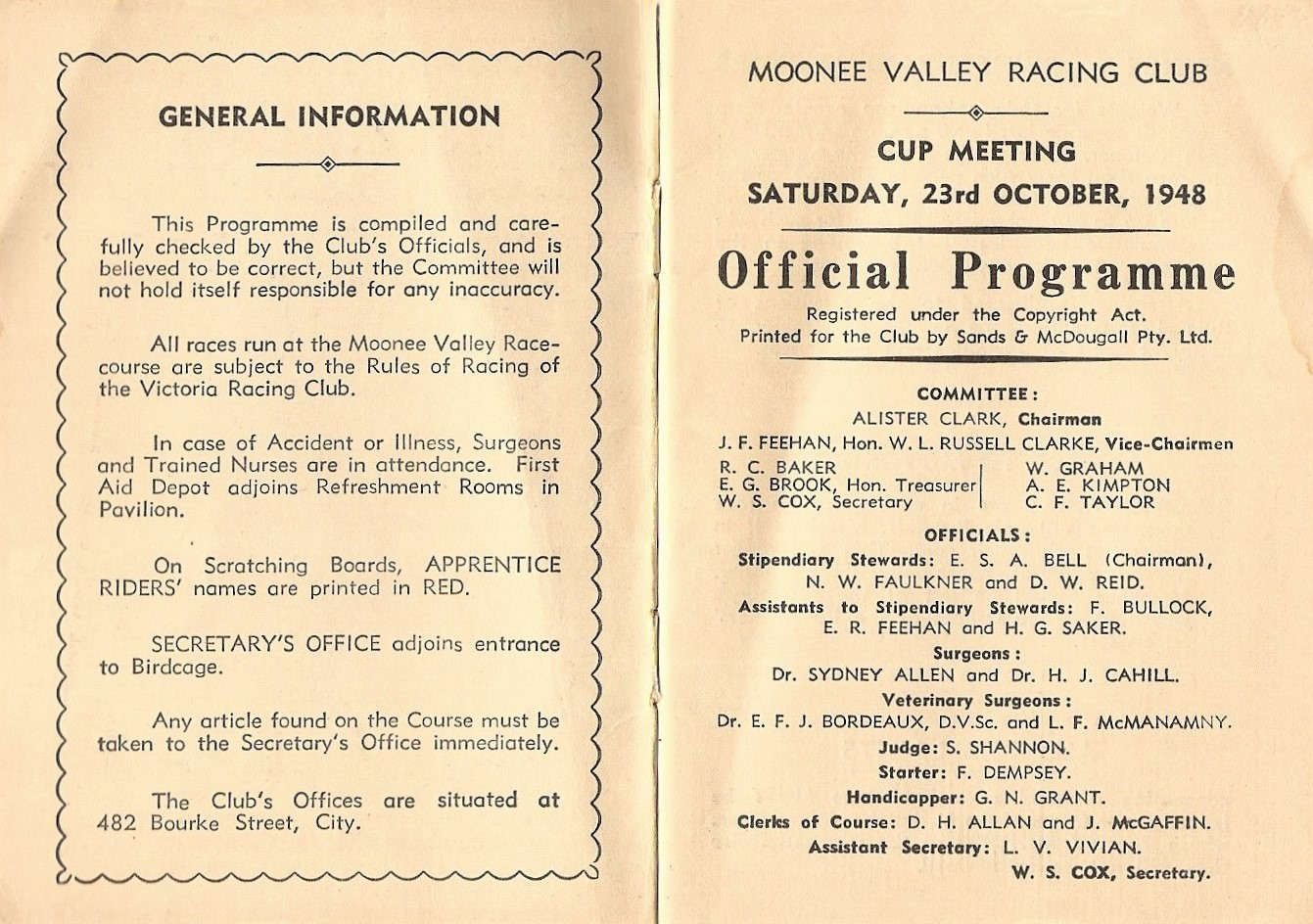
1948 Moonee Valley Cup showing raceday officials

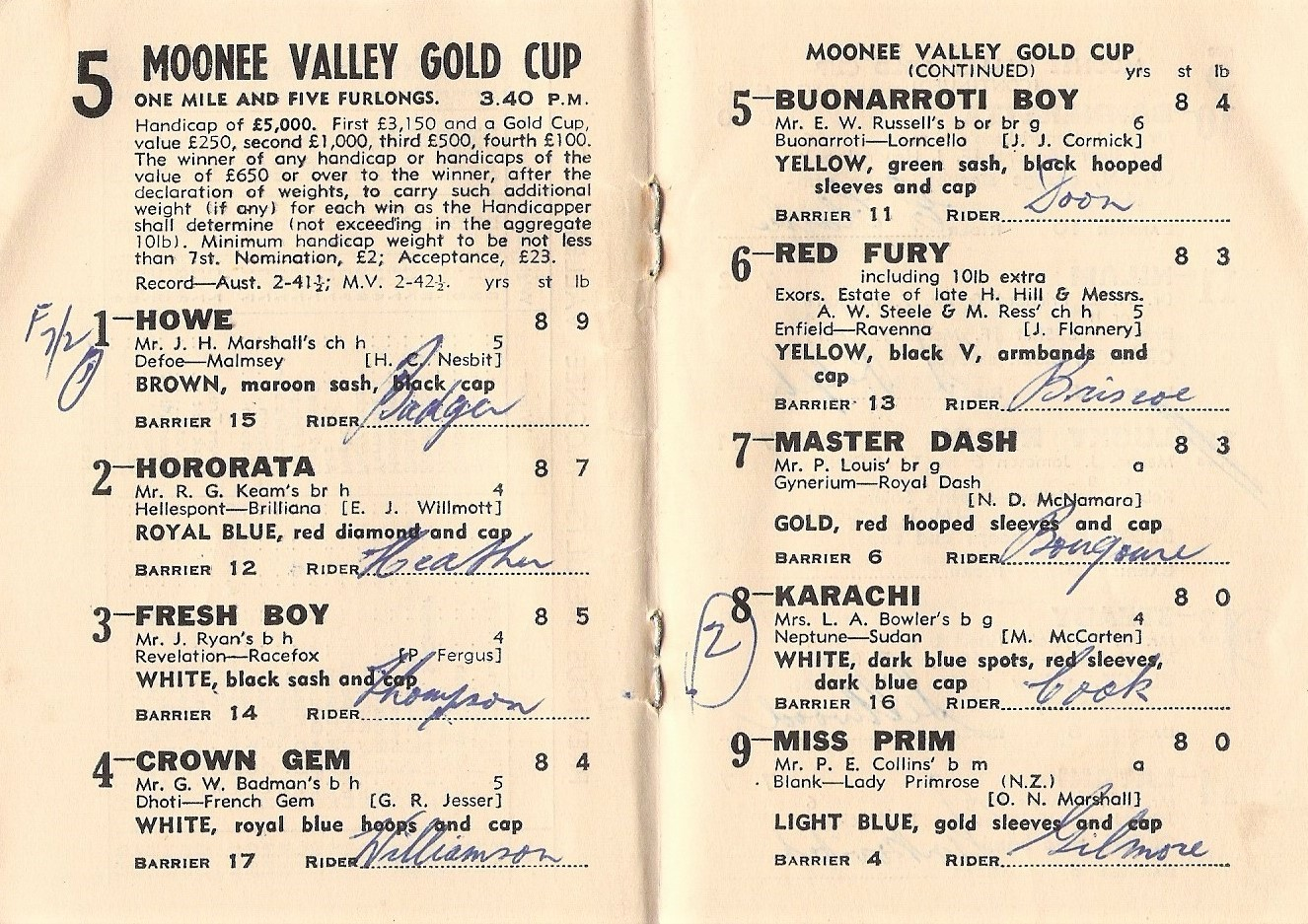
1948 Moonee Valley Cup starters and results showing the winner, Howe

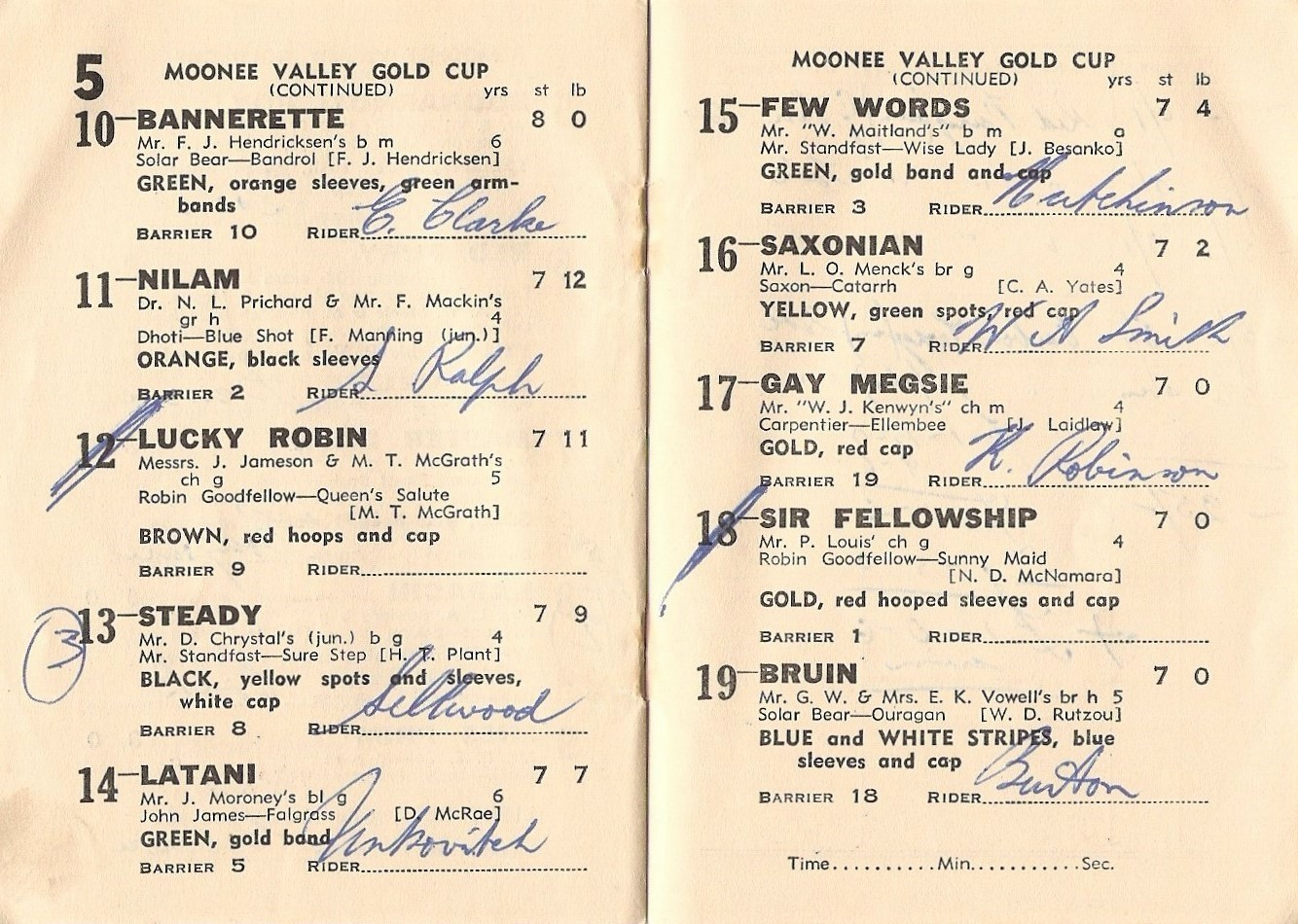
1948 Moonee Valley Cup starters and results

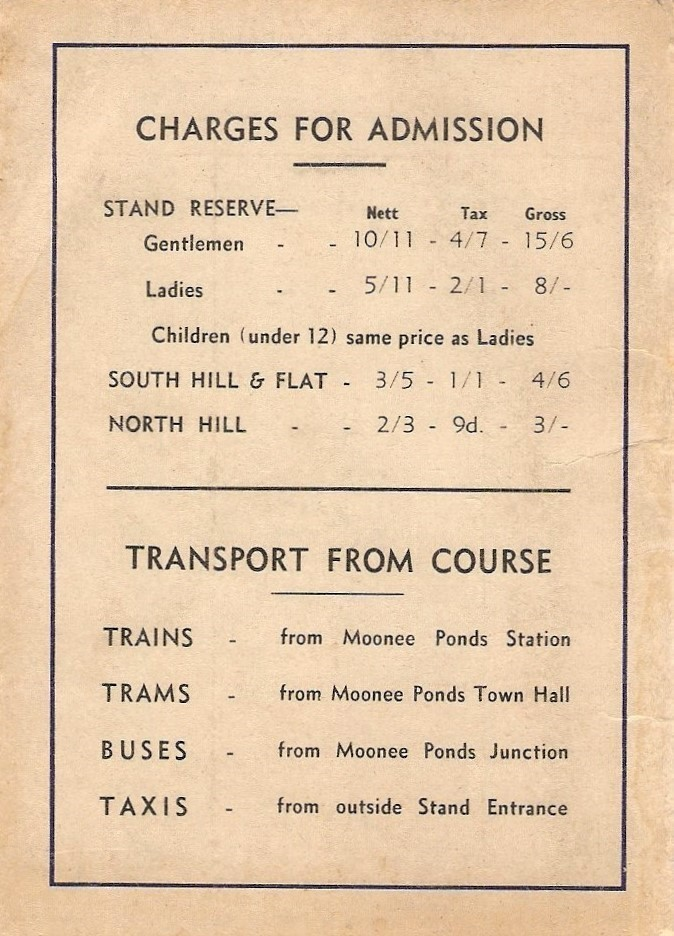
Back cover showing admission charges & transport arrangements

=== Name ===
- 1883–1975 - Moonee Valley Cup
- 1976–1979 - Governors Stakes
- 1980–1996 - Moonee Valley Cup
- 1997–2002 - Grosby Gold Cup
- 2003–2010 - Cathay Pacific Gold Cup
- 2011–2013 - Drake International Cup
- 2014 - racing.com Moonee Valley Gold Cup
- 2015 - Melbourne Signage Concepts Moonee Valley Gold Cup
- 2016 - Antler Luggage Moonee Valley Gold Cup
- 2017–2022 - McCafe Moonee Valley Gold Cup
- 2023–current - Ladbrokes Moonee Valley Gold Cup

=== Distance ===
- 1883–1884 - 1 mile (~1600 metres)
- 1885–1888 - 6 furlongs (~1200 metres)
- 1889–1899 - 7 furlongs (~1400 metres)
- 1900–1908 - 1 3/8 miles (~2200 metres)
- 1909 - 1 1/2 miles (~2400 metres)
- 1910–1918 - 1 1/4 (~2000 metres)
- 1919 - 1 5/8 miles (~2600 metres)
- 1920 - 1 1/2 miles (~2400 metres)
- 1921–1923 - 1 5/8 miles (~2600 metres)
- 1924–1932 - 1 7/16 miles (~2300 metres)
- 1933 - 1 5/8 miles (~2600 metres)
- 1934–1935 1 1/2 miles (~2400 metres)
- 1936–1972 - 1 5/8 miles (~2600 metres)
- 1973–1994 – 2600 metres
- 1995 onwards - 2500 metres

=== Grade ===
- 1883–1978 was a Principal race
- 1979 - Group 3
- 1980 onwards - Group 2

== Winners ==
The following are past winners of the race.

- 2026 - Juja Kibo
- 2025 - Onesmoothoperator
- 2024 - Okita Soushi
- 2023 - Cleveland
- 2022 - Francesco Guardi
- 2021 - Lunar Flare
- 2020 - Miami Bound
- 2019 - Hunting Horn
- 2018 - Ventura Storm
- 2017 - Who Shot Thebarman
- 2016 - Grand Marshal
- 2015 - The United States
- 2014 - Prince Of Penzance
- 2013 - Precedence
- 2012 - Vatuvei
- 2011 - Americain
- 2010 - Precedence
- 2009 - The Sportsman
- 2008 - Gallopin
- 2007 - Gallic
- 2006 - Zipping
- 2005 - Umbula
- 2004 - Another Warrior
- 2003 - Frightening
- 2002 - Thong Classic
- 2001 - Rain Gauge
- 2000 - Yippyio
- 1999 - Streak
- 1998 - Price Standaan
- 1997 - Court Of Honour
- 1996 - Istidaad
- 1995 - Storm
- 1994 - Top Rating
- 1993 - Glastonbury
- 1992 - Donegal Mist
- 1991 - Al Maheb
- 1990 - Kingston Rule
- 1989 - Sydeston
- 1988 - Ideal Centreman
- 1987 - King Matthias
- 1986 - Reckless Tradition
- 1985 - Butternut
- 1984 - Holsam
- 1983 - Toujours Mio
- 1982 - Triumphal March
- 1981 - Saxon Slew
- 1980 - Tai Salute
- 1979 - Sir Sahib
- 1978 - Clear Day
- 1977 - Ngawyni
- 1976 - Poker Night
- 1975 - Holiday Waggon
- 1974 - Lord Metric
- 1973 - Grand Scale
- 1972 - Double Irish
- 1971 - Skint Dip
- 1970 - Mr. President
- 1969 - What's Brewing
- 1968 - Impetus
- 1967 - Prince Camillo
- 1966 - Tea Biscuit
- 1965 - Red William
- 1964 - Algalon
- 1963 - My Contact
- 1962 - River Seine
- 1961 - Baroda Gleam
- 1960 - Mac
- 1959 - Sanvo
- 1958 - Humber Hawk
- 1957 - Lord Gavin
- 1956 - Pandie Sun
- 1955 - Al Crusa
- 1954 - Hellion
- 1953 - Wodalla
- 1952 - King Amana
- 1951 - Erriton
- 1950 - Benvolo
- 1949 - Hoyle
- 1948 - Howe
- 1947 - Don Pedro
- 1946 - Valcurl
- 1945 - Valcurl
- 1944 - Queen Midas
- 1943 - Haros
- 1942 - Dark Felt
- 1941 - Yours Truly
- 1940 - Gilltown
- 1939 - Gilltown
- 1938 - Ortelle's Star
- 1937 - Frill Prince
- 1936 - Dark Chief
- 1935 - Art
- 1934 - Nightly
- 1933 - Peter Jackson
- 1932 - Yarramba
- 1931 - Homedale
- 1930 - Shadow King
- 1929 - Prince Viol
- 1928 - Nawallah
- 1927 - Silvius
- 1926 - Royal Charter
- 1925 - Tookarby
- 1924 - Stand By
- 1923 - Princess Mernda
- 1922 - Purser
- 1921 - Wirriway
- 1920 - White Plast
- 1919 - Telecles
- 1918 - Rael Locin
- 1917 - Kunegetis
- 1916 - Andelosia
- 1915 - Gladwyn
- 1914 - Gladwyn
- 1913 - Greek Fire
- 1912 - Almissa
- 1911 - Hartfell
- 1910 - Kerlie
- 1909 - Flavinius
- 1908 - Woorooma
- 1907 - May King
- 1906 - Charles Stuart
- 1905 - Blue Spec
- 1904 - Patronus
- 1903 - T.M.S.
- 1902 - The Persian
- 1901 - Combat
- 1900 - Clean Sweep
- 1899 - Sweetheart
- 1898 - Locksmith
- 1897 - Mirella
- 1896 - Veronica
- 1895 - Our Jack
- 1894 - Preston
- 1893 - Premier
- 1892 - Little Bob
- 1891 - Little Bob
- 1890 - Wiora
- 1889 - Don Giovan
- 1888 - Newmaster
- 1887 - Quintin Matsys
- 1886 - Isonomy
- 1885 - Merrimu
- 1884 - Meteor
- 1883 - Castaway

== See also ==
- Cox Plate
- Crystal Mile
- Moonee Valley Fillies Classic
- Moonee Valley Vase
- Red Anchor Stakes
- Tesio Stakes
- List of Australian Group races
- Group races
