= Turn Me Loose (horse) =

New Zealand-bred thoroughbred racehorse and stud stallion

- Sire: Iffraaj (GB)
- Grandsire: Zafonic
- Dam: Indomitable (NZ)
- Damsire: Danehill
- Sex: Stallion
- Foaled: 3 November 2011
- Country: NZ
- Colour: Bay
- Breeder: G W & Mrs M W Simon
- Trainer: Murray Baker & Andrew Forsman
- Record: 20:7-4-1
- Earnings: A$1,594,884

Turn Me Loose (foaled 2011) is a New Zealand Thoroughbred racehorse who is notable for being the winner of a number of Group races and was awarded the title of being the Champion Sprinter & Middle Distance Horse in New Zealand in 2015-16. He has gone on to forge a successful career as a stud stallion.

He was bred by George Simon, the well known New Zealand race commentator and his wife Maryanne.

== Racing career ==
Turn Me Loose's notable wins and placings included:

- 1st in the 2014 Hawke's Bay Guineas (Group 2, 1400m at Hastings), beating Prince Mambo and Longchamp
- 1st in the 2014 New Zealand 2000 Guineas (Group 1, 1600m at Riccarton), beating Rockfast (AUS) and Prince Mambo
- 1st in the 2015 Seymour Cup, (Listed 1600m at Seymour) beating Scream Machine and Garud
- 1st in the 2015 Crystal Mile (Group 2 1600m at Moonee Valley), beating Bow Creek (IRE) and Lucky Hussler
- 1st in the 2015 Emirates Stakes (Group 1, 1600m at Flemington), beating Politeness and Rock Sturdy
- 1st in the 2016 Futurity Stakes (MRC) (Group 1, 1400m at Caulfield), beating Stratum Star and Suavito
- 2nd in the 2017 C F Orr Stakes behind Black Heart Bart with Ecuador (NZ) 3rd

== Stud career ==
Turn Me Loose stood at Windsor Park Stud, near Cambridge, New Zealand. His 2022 service fee was $20,000 (+ GST).

His first winner was Turn The Ace at Te Rapa on 1 May 2021

Turn Me Loose was exported to China in January 2026.

=== Notable progeny ===
c = colt, f = filly/mare, g = gelding

Foaled	Name	Sex	Dam	Damsire	Major wins / placings
2019	Lickety Split	f	She's Slinky	Handsome Ransom	2022 Sistema Stakes (Group 1, 1200m); 2022 Northland Breeders Stakes (Group 3, 1200m)
2019	Loosespender	g	Spendaholic	No Excuse Needed (GB)	2023 Waikato Guineas ((Group 2, 2000m)
2018	Prix De Turn	c	Prix du Sang	Red Ransom	2022 Alister Clark Stakes (Group 2)

== See also ==
- Thoroughbred racing in New Zealand
