= Matriarch Stakes (VRC) =

- Class: Group 2
- Location: Flemington Racecourse, Melbourne, Australia
- Inaugurated: 1995 (Listed)
- Race type: Thoroughbred
- Sponsor: TAB (2019 - 2026)

Race information
- Distance: 2,000 metres
- Surface: Turf
- Track: Left-handed
- Qualification: Mares, four years old and older that are not maidens
- Weight: Set weights with penalties
- Purse: A$300,000 (2026)

The Matriarch Stakes is a Victoria Racing Club Group 2 Thoroughbred horse race for mares aged four years old and upwards, run at set weights with penalties, over a distance of 2,000 metres, held annually at Flemington Racecourse, Melbourne, Australia in November on the last day of the VRC Spring Carnival.

== History ==
=== Grade ===
- 1995–2000 - Listed Race
- 2001–2004 - Group 3
- 2005 - onwards Group 2

=== Name ===
- 1995–2004 - Matriarch Stakes
- 2005–2007 - Hilton International Stakes
- 2008–2012 - Matriarch Stakes
- 2013–2014 - Momentum Energy Stakes
- 2015 - Matriarch Stakes

== Winners ==
The following are past winners of the race.

- 2026 - Sun Gift
- 2025 - Sunset Park
- 2024 - Hinged
- 2023 - Deny Knowledge
- 2022 - Atishu
- 2021 - Zayydani
- 2020 - Affair To Remember
- 2019 - Oceanex
- 2018 - Kenedna
- 2017 - Savapinski
- 2016 - Jessy Belle
- 2015 - Lucia Valentina
- 2014 - Suavito
- 2013 - Girl Gone Rockin'
- 2012 - Midnight Martini
- 2011 - Vintedge
- 2010 - Well Rounded
- 2009 - Purple
- 2008 - Bird Of Fire
- 2007 - Hidden Strings
- 2006 - Brom Felinity
- 2005 - Sutology
- 2004 - Demerger
- 2003 - Sweet Corn
- 2002 - Damaschino
- 2001 - Piper Star
- 2000 - Flushed
- 1999 - Sly Sandra
- 1998 - Laebeel
- 1997 - Battocchi
- 1996 - Gold City
- 1995 - Magical Storm
- 1994 - Sudden Wonder
- 1993 - Gilded Splendor

== See also ==
- Champions Mile (VRC)
- Champions Sprint (VRC)
- Champions Stakes
- Queen Elizabeth Stakes
- Thoroughbred racing in Australia
- Melbourne Spring Racing Carnival
- VRC Stakes day
- List of Australian Group races
- Group races
