= W. S. Cox Plate =

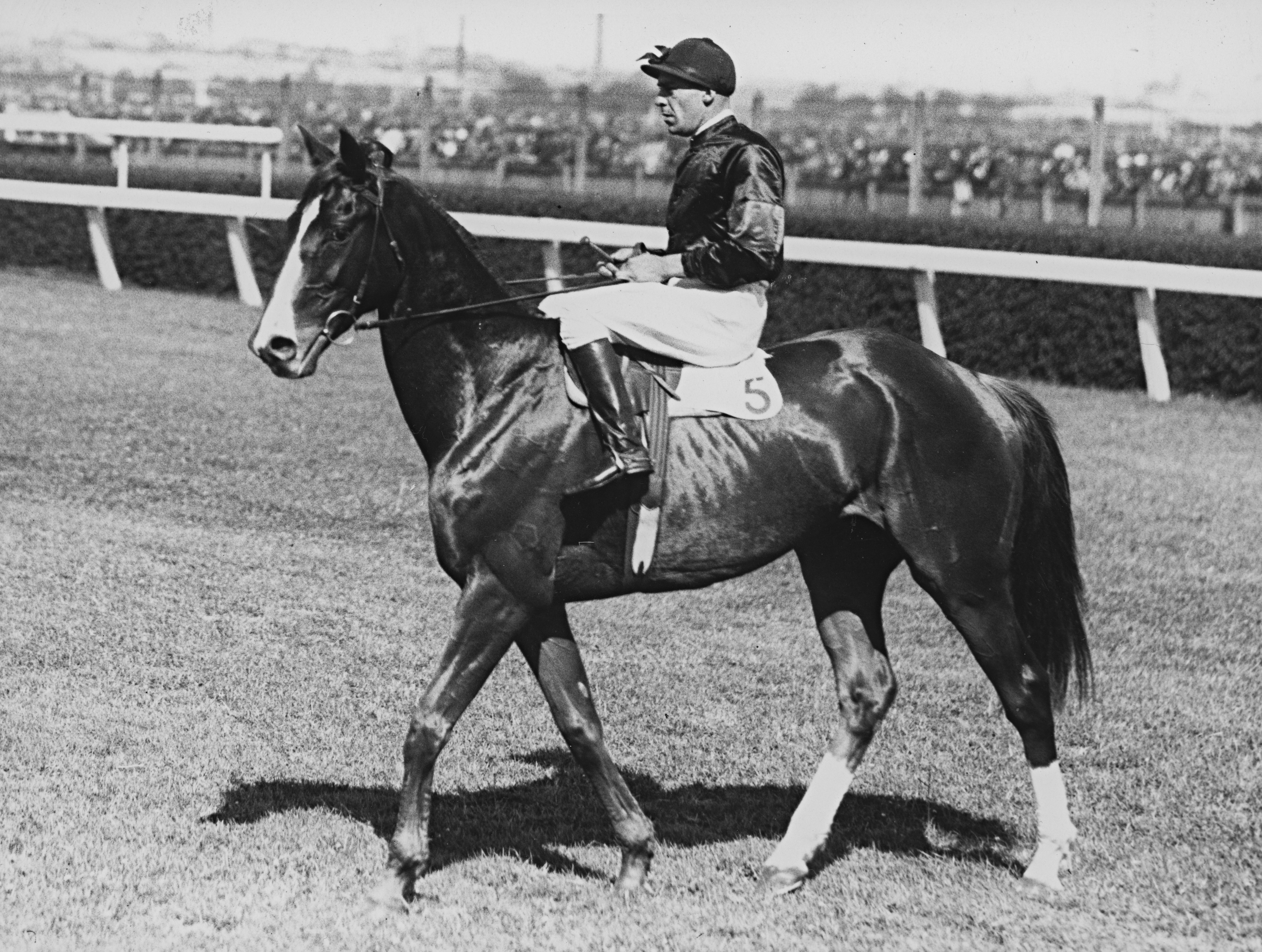
- Rogilla, 1933 winner, and Darby Munro
- Class: Group One
- Location: Moonee Valley Racecourse, Melbourne, Australia
- Inaugurated: 1922; 104 years ago List of Cox Plate winners
- Race type: Thoroughbred – Flat racing
- Sponsor: Ladbrokes (2025)
- Website: Moonee Valley Racing Club

Race information
- Distance: 2,040 metres
- Surface: Turf
- Track: Left-handed
- Qualification: Horses three years old and older
- Weight: Weight for age
- Purse: A$6,000,000 (2025)
- Bonuses: Winner ballot exemption from the Melbourne Cup

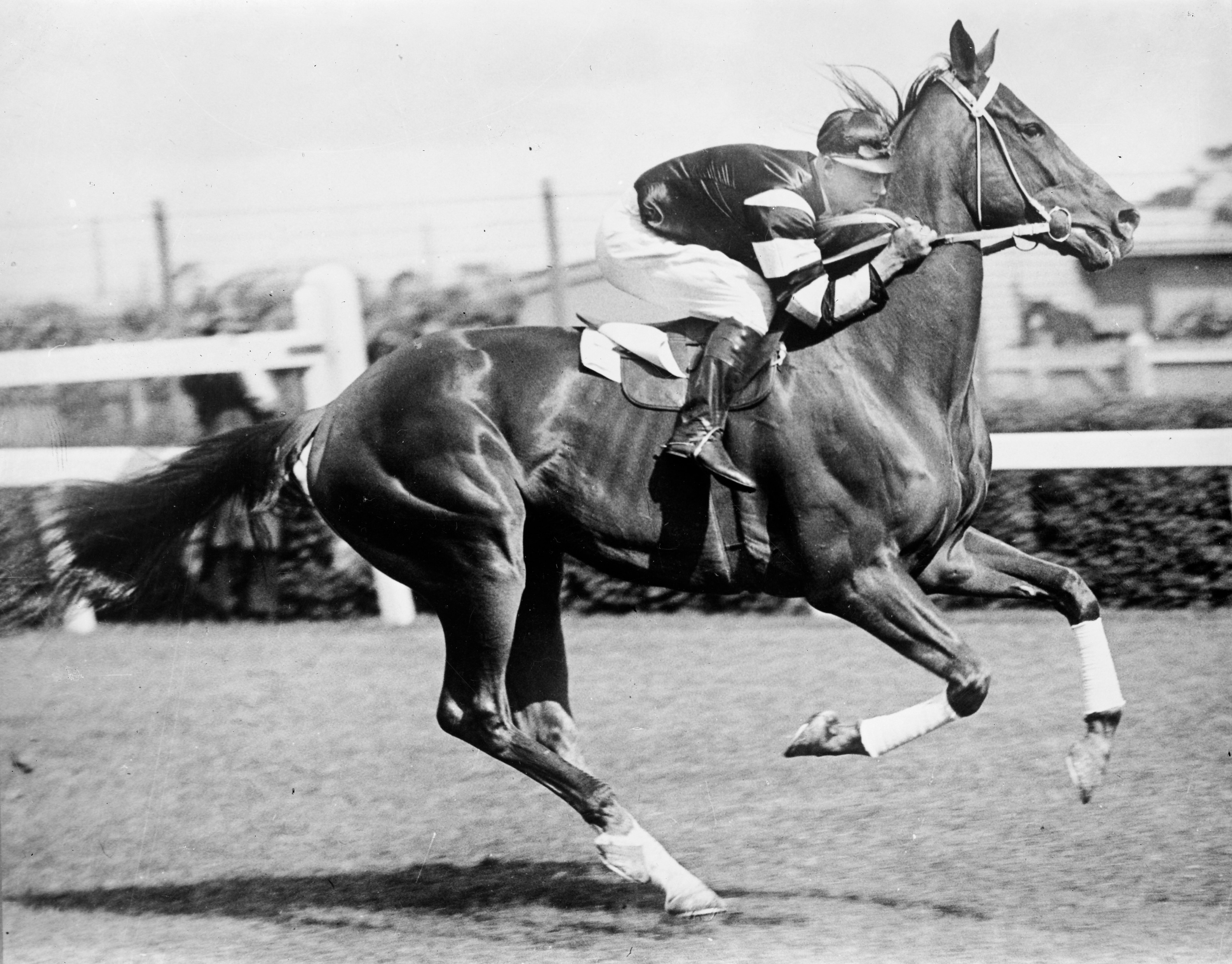
Phar Lap, 1930 and 1931 winner

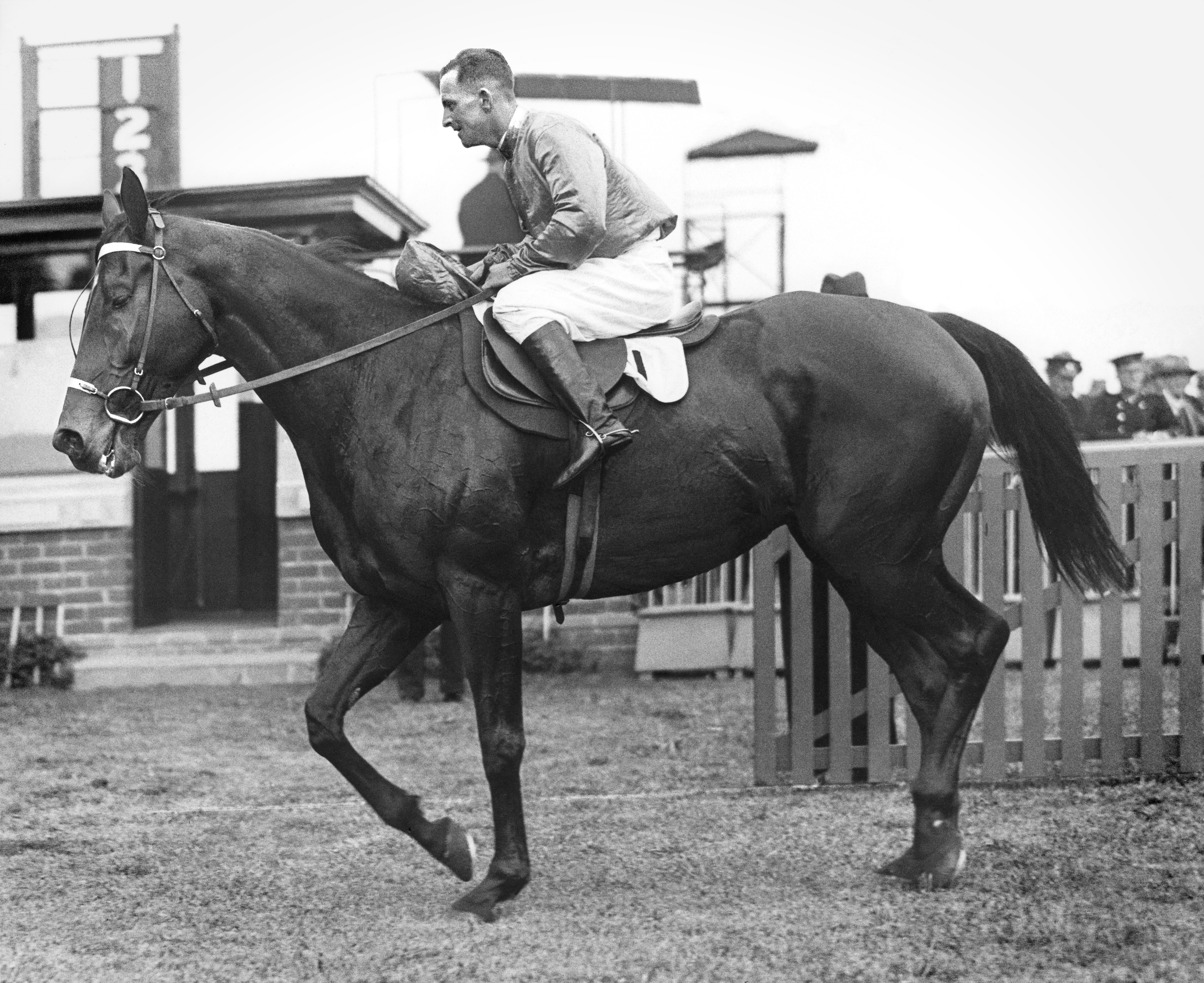
Amounis, 1927 Cox Plate winner

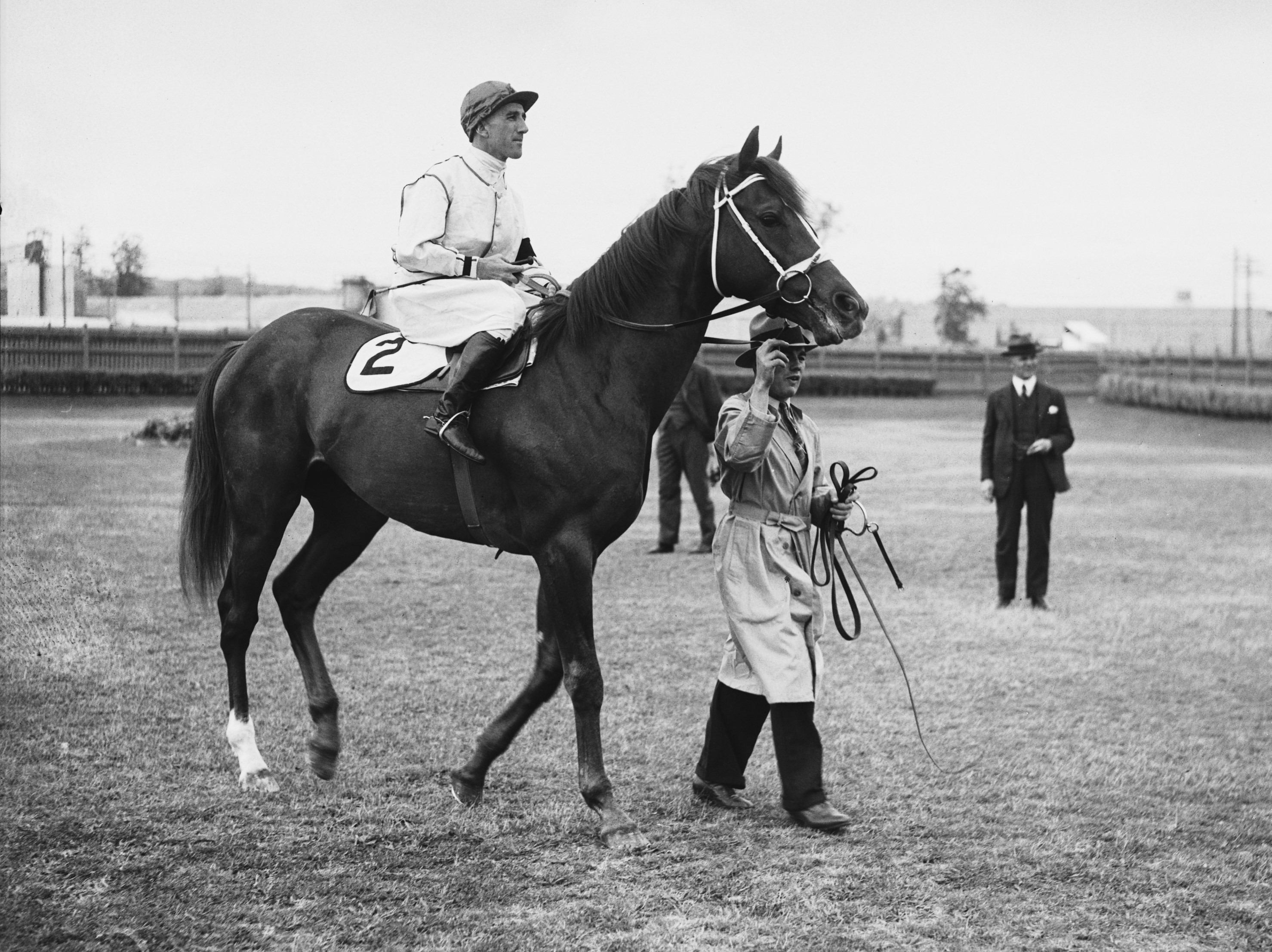
Ajax, 1938 winner

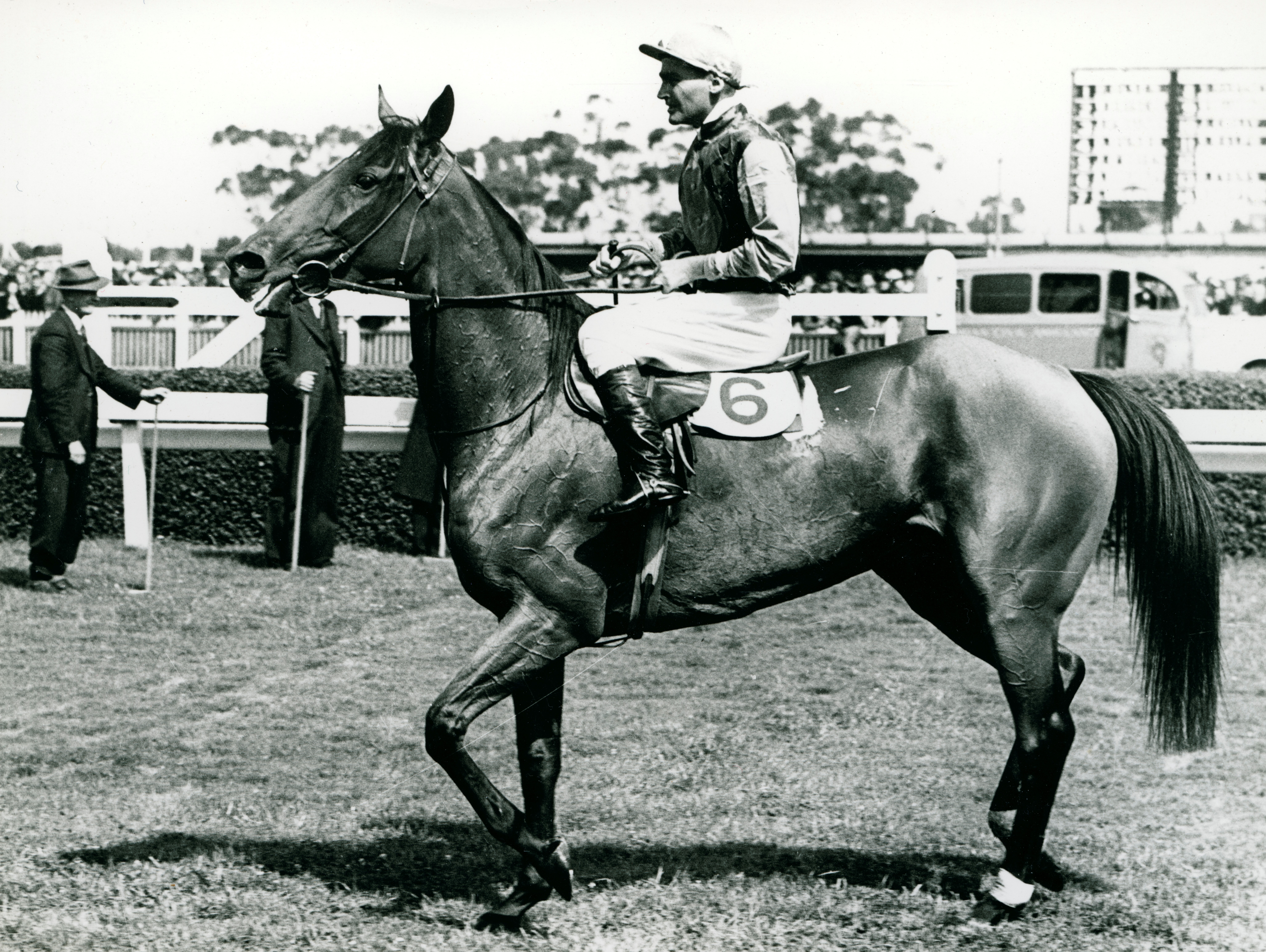
Flight, 1945 & 1946 winner

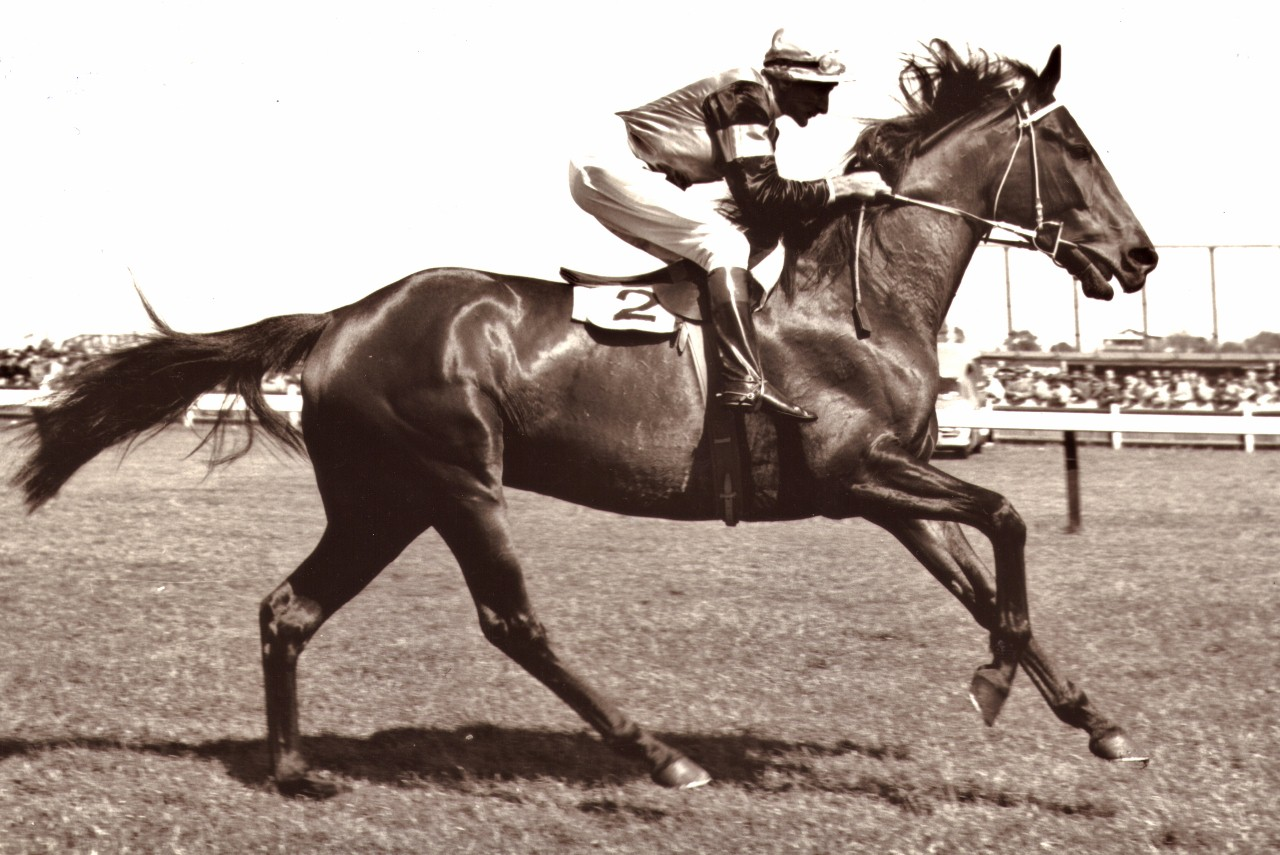
Rising Fast, 1954 winner

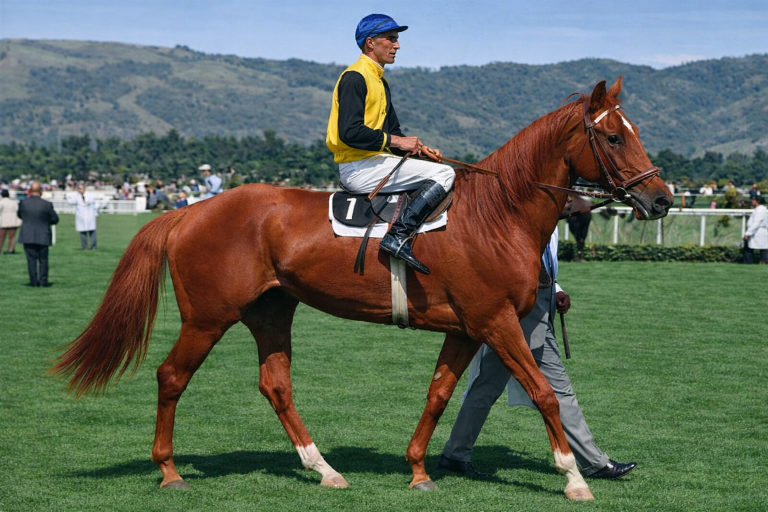
Redcraze, 1957 winner

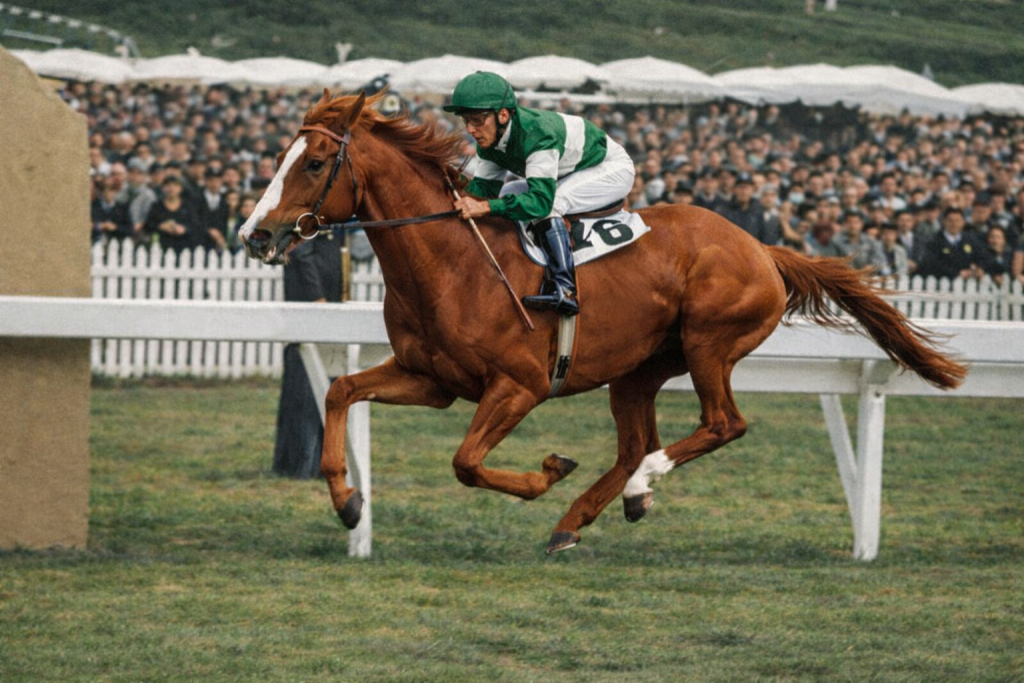
Carbon Copy, 1948 winner

The W. S. Cox Plate is a Group 1 Thoroughbred horse race for horses aged three years old and over under Weight for age conditions, over a distance of 2040 metres (approximately 1m 2f), that is held by the Moonee Valley Racing Club at Moonee Valley Racecourse, Melbourne, Australia in late October. The race has a purse of A$6,000,000.

== History ==
The race is named in honour of William Samuel (W. S.) Cox, the racing club's founder.

It was first run on Saturday 28 October 1922 with a purse of A£1,000 (equivalent to $93,065 in 2022).

Between 1999–2005, the event was included in the Emirates World Series Racing Championship, a global "grand prix" of horse racing. The series included the King George VI and Queen Elizabeth Stakes at Ascot, the Japan Cup, the Dubai World Cup, the Arlington Million, the Hong Kong Cup, the Canadian International Stakes, the Grosser Preis von Baden, the Irish Champion Stakes, the Breeders' Cup Turf and the Breeders' Cup Classic.

In August 2025, it was announced that due to renovations at Moonee Valley that are scheduled to begin after that year's Cox Plate, the 2026 edition of the race would be run at Flemington Racecourse. It will be the first time in history that the Cox Plate will be run at a racecourse other than Moonee Valley.

== 1938 and 1948 racebooks ==
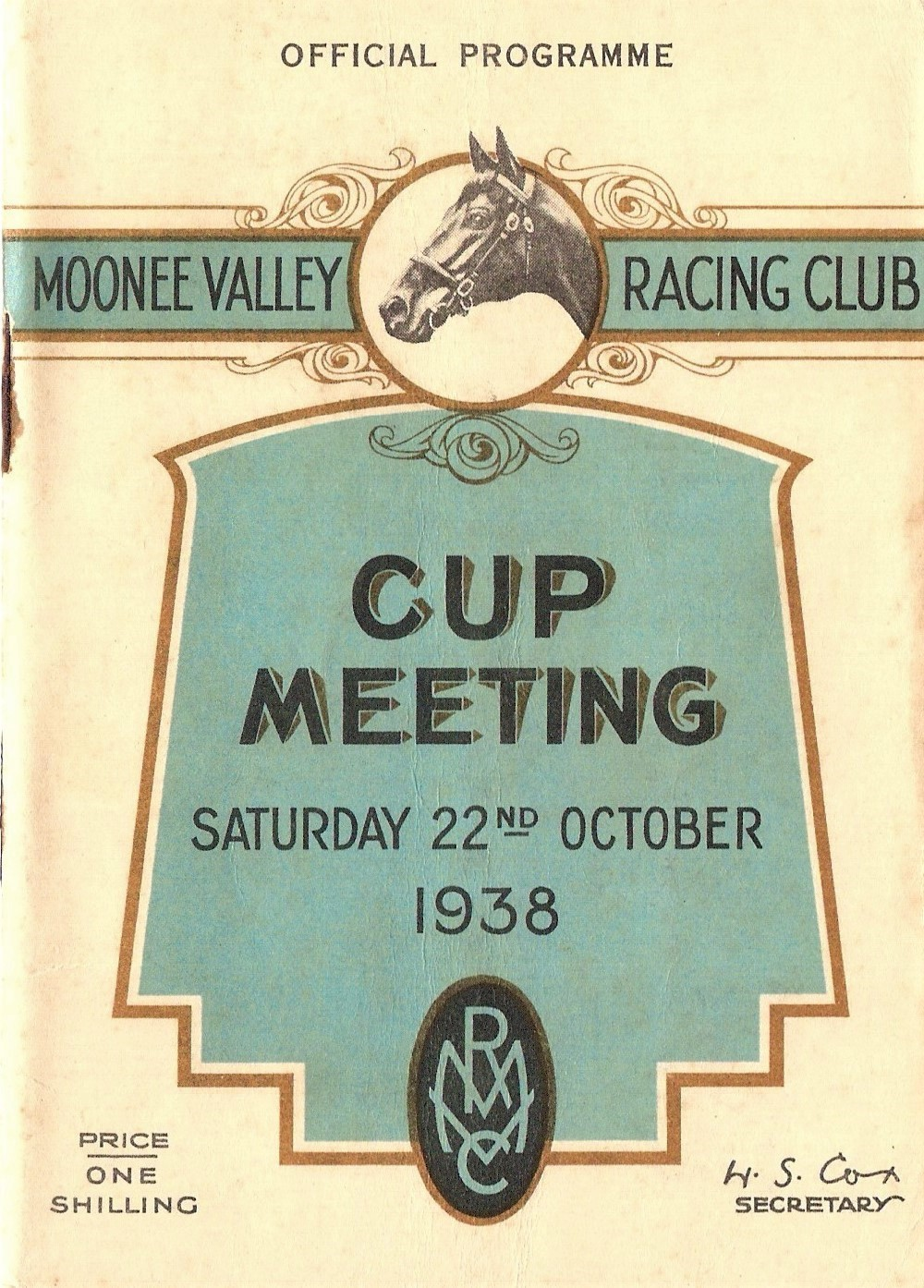
1938 MVRC W S Cox Plate racebook front cover

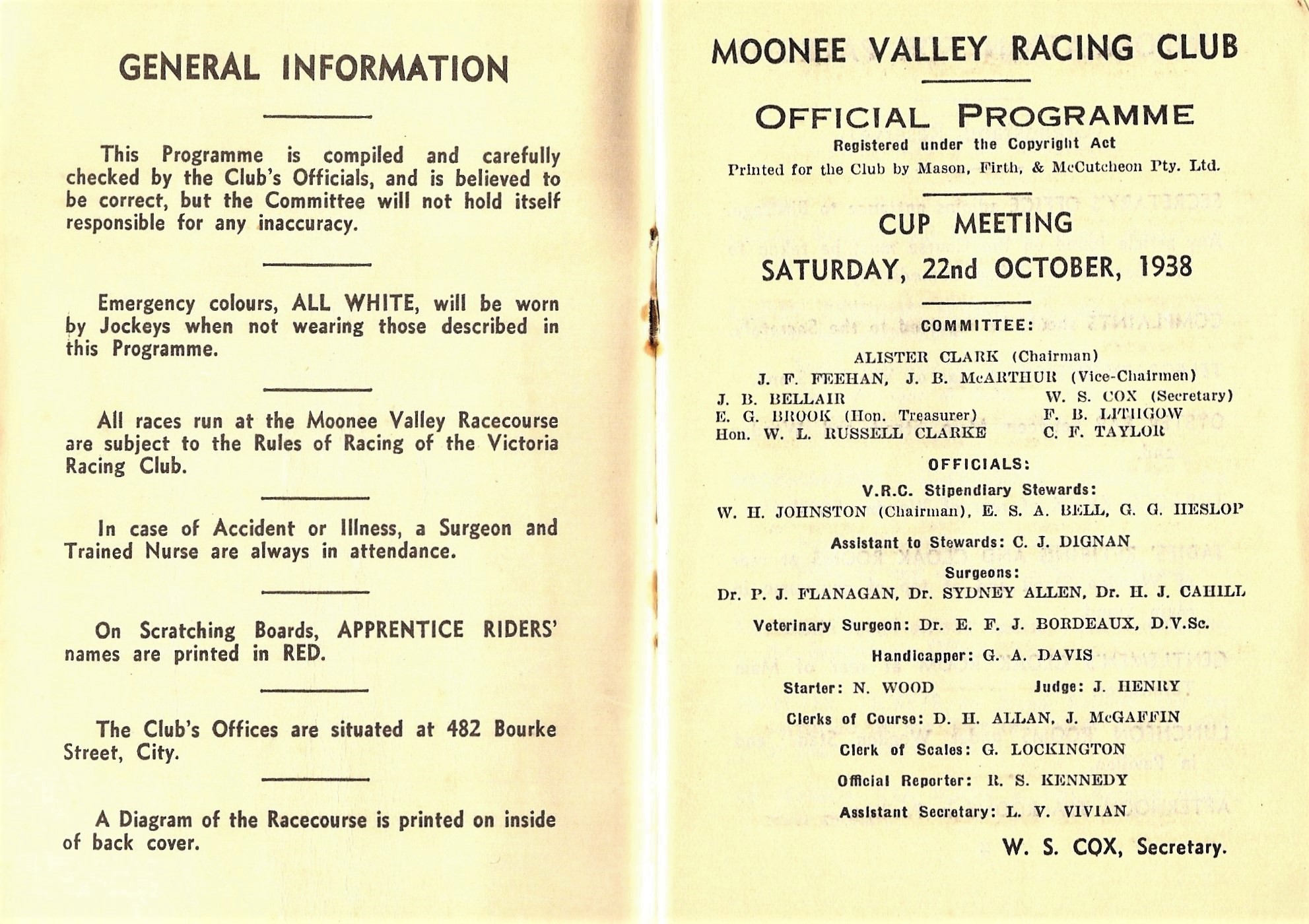
1938 MVRC W S Cox Plate showing raceday officials

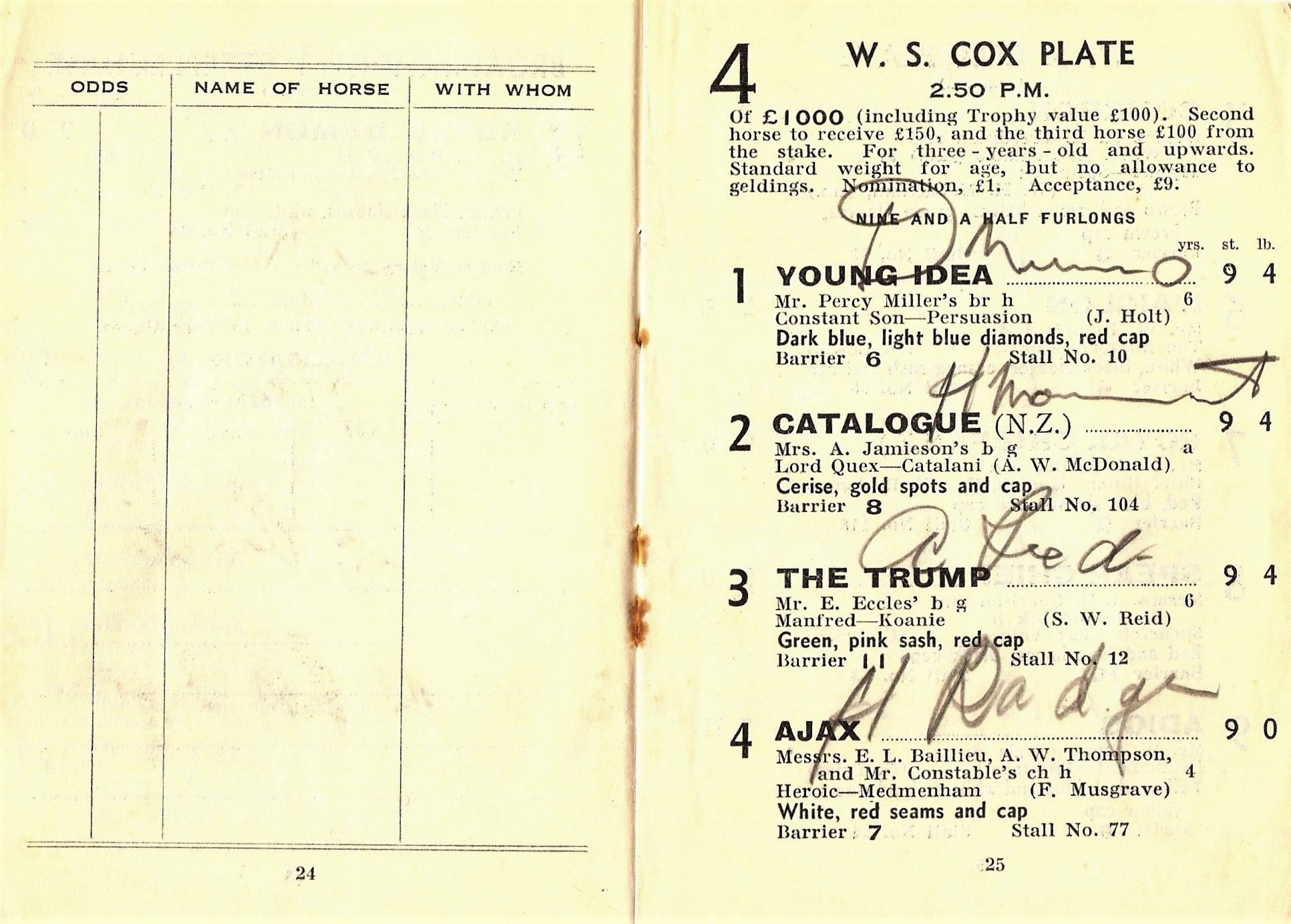
1938 MVRC W S Cox Plate starters and results showing the winner, Ajax

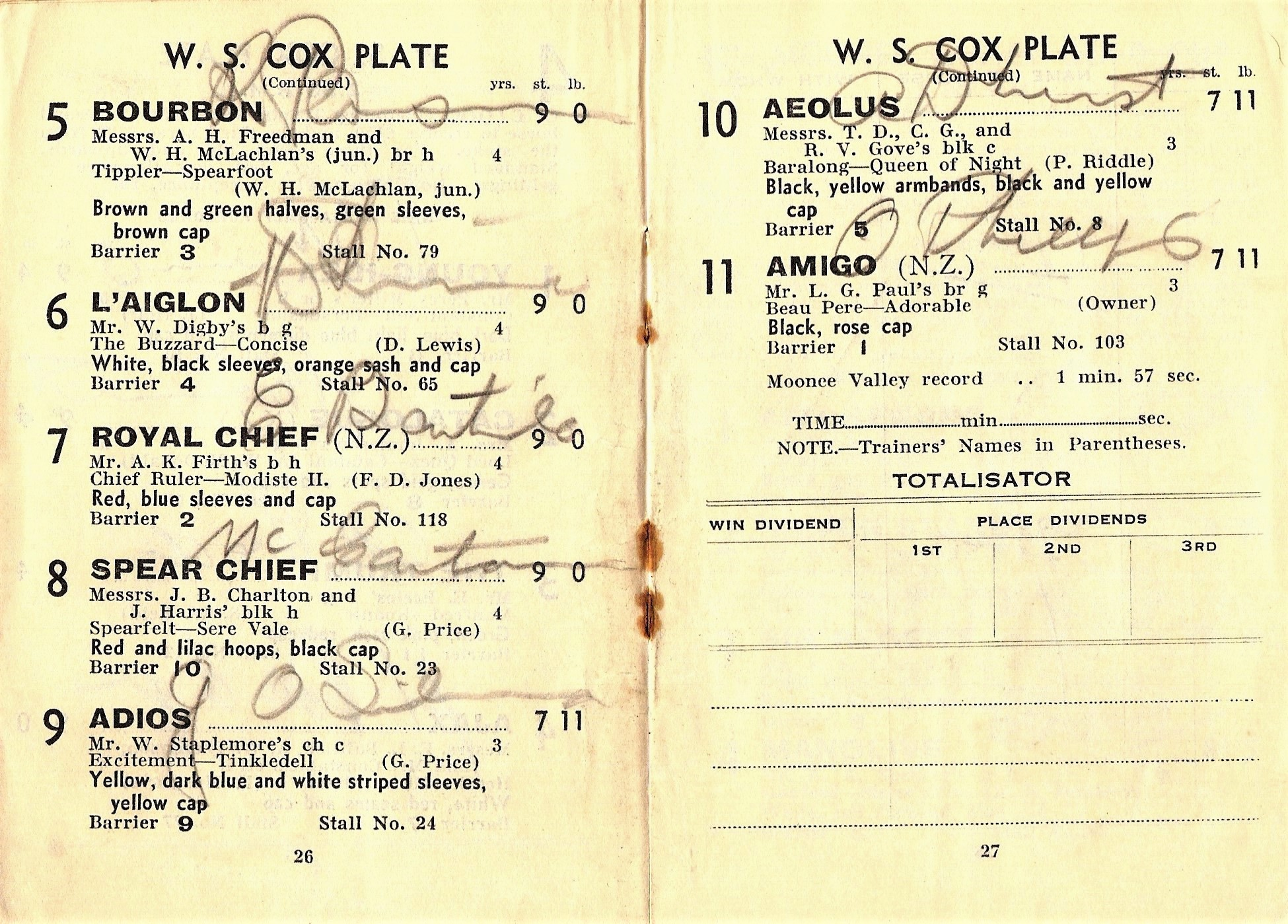
1938 MVRC W S Cox Plate starters and results

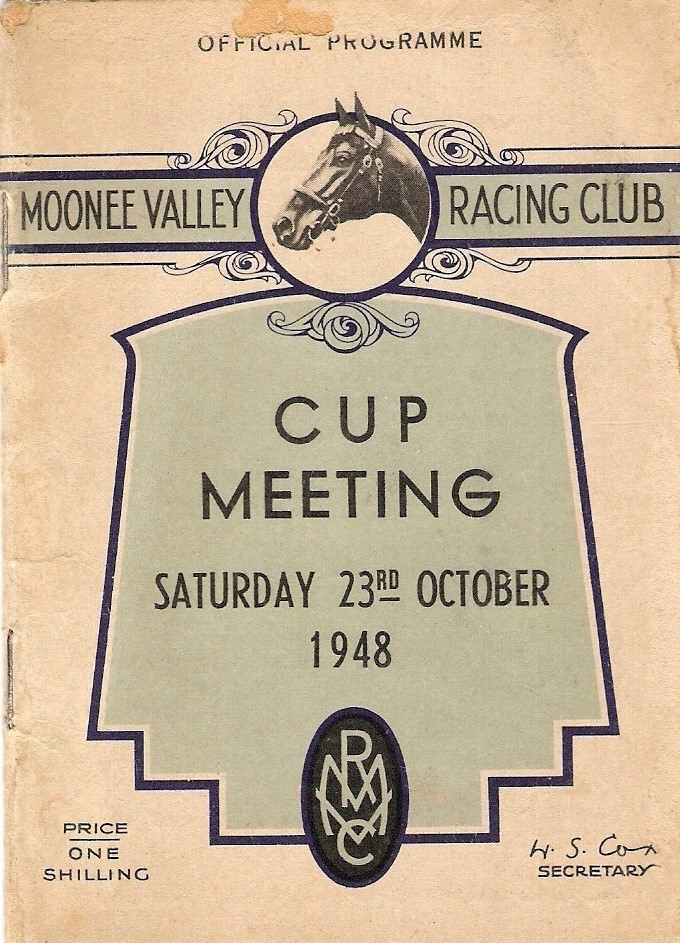
1948 W. S. Cox Plate racebook front cover

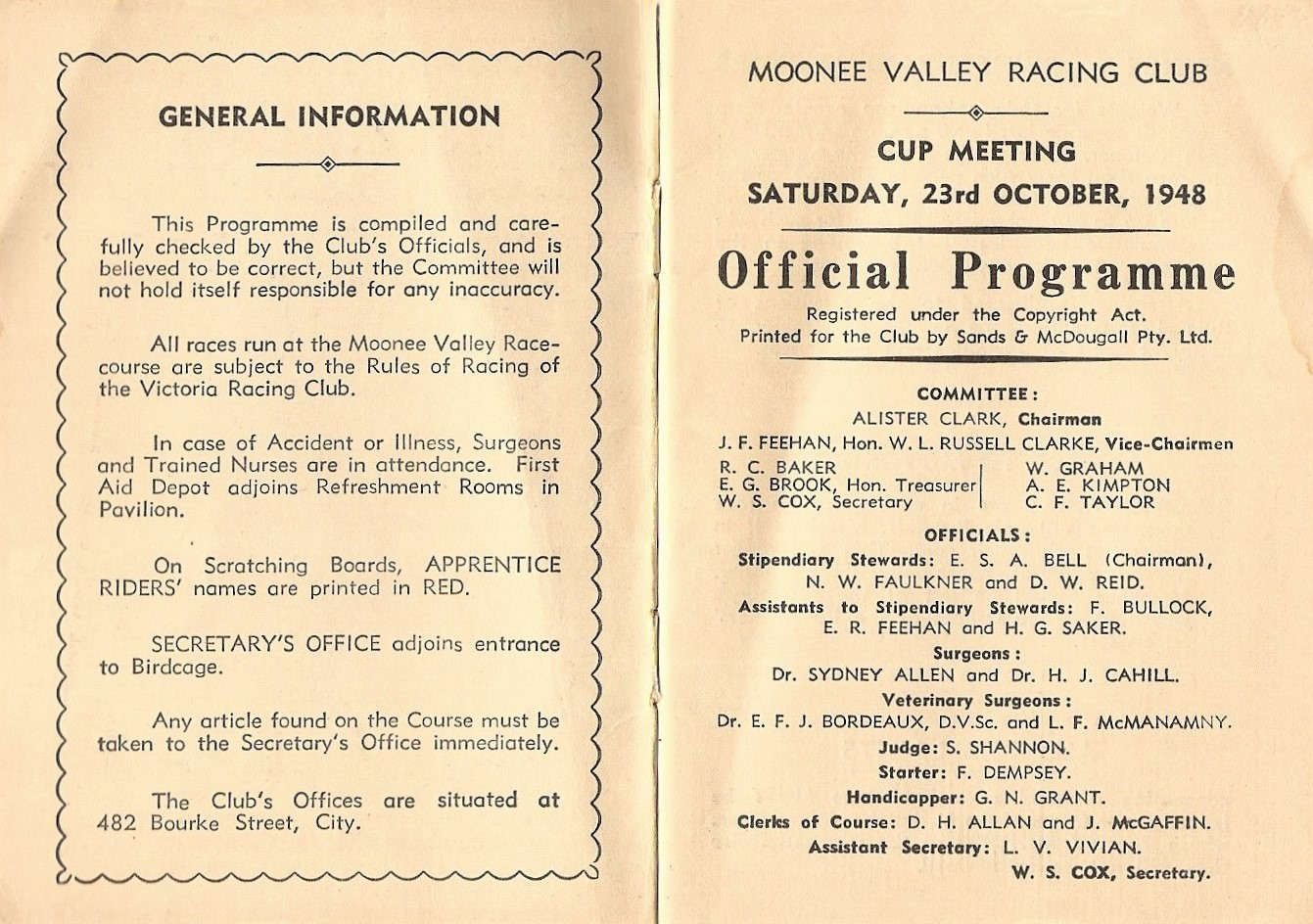
1948 W. S. Cox Plate showing raceday officials

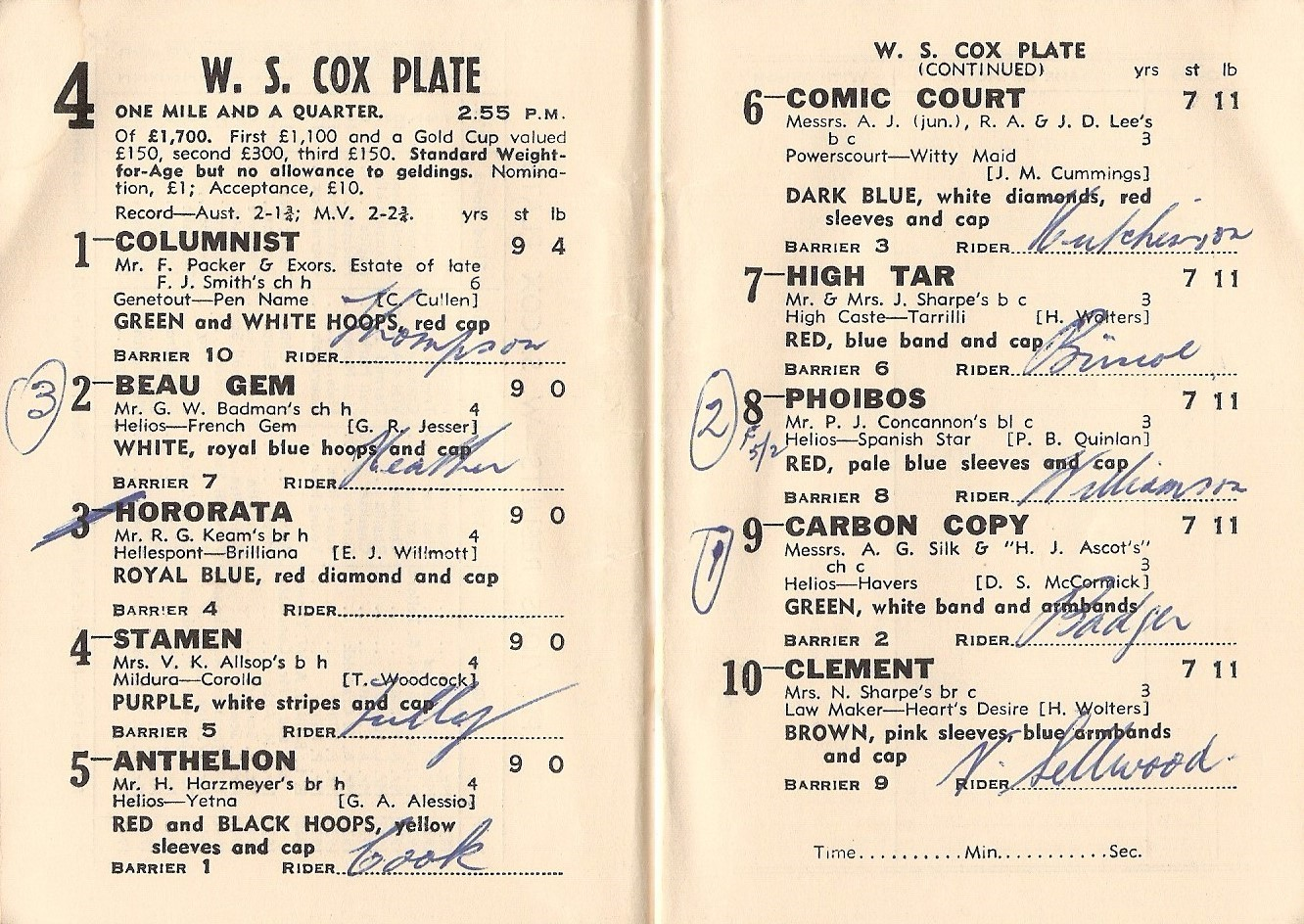
1948 W. S. Cox Plate starters and results showing the winner, Carbon Copy

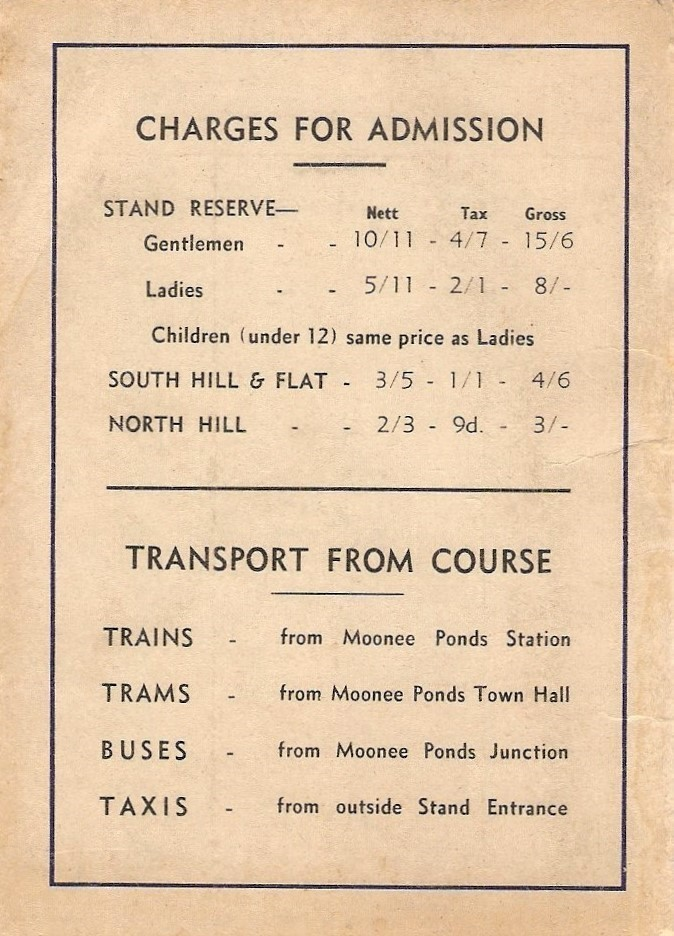
Back cover showing admission charges & transport arrangements

== Notable winners ==
Past winners of the Cox Plate include many of the champion racehorses of Australia and New Zealand. Winx has been the most successful, winning four years in a row (2015–2018) and Kingston Town won the race three times. Many horses have won the race twice, including Phar Lap, Flight, Tobin Bronze, Sunline, Northerly, Fields of Omagh, and So You Think.

Only one horse has ever won the race in the same year as winning the Melbourne and Caulfield cups, Rising Fast (1954), considered by many to be the greatest-ever horse from New Zealand. One other horse, Might & Power, has won all 3 races but the Cox Plate win was in the next year.

The double with the Melbourne Cup has only been achieved by seven horses: Makybe Diva, Might and Power, Saintly, Nightmarch, Phar Lap, Delta and Rising Fast.

Only three horses have ever won the Melbourne Cup and then gone on to win the Cox Plate the following year: Phar Lap, Might and Power and Makybe Diva.

The first Cox Plate was run in 1922 and won by the English horse Violoncello, who also won his next three starts during the Melbourne Spring Racing Carnival.

The 1925 race was taken out by three-year-old Manfred, who went on to win the VRC Derby and ran second to Windbag in the Melbourne Cup.

The class gallopers Heroic (21 wins from 51 races) and Amounis (33 wins from 78 races) were successful in 1926 and 1927.

Champion New Zealand-bred Nightmarch won in 1929 before Phar Lap took out the race in 1930 and 1931. Another dual winner of the race was Chatham in 1932 and 1934, as was Young Idea in 1936 and 1937.

The 1938 race was won by Ajax (36 wins from 46 races) in race record time. Outstanding New Zealand champion Beau Vite, a winner of 31 races, won in 1940 and 1941.

Due to restrictions on interstate travel due to World War II, the race was only contested by local horses from 1942 to 1944.

In 1946, the Cox Plate was run in two divisions with the mare Flight winning the stronger division. She became a dual winner following her victory a year earlier. Hydrogen became the seventh dual winner of the race with victories in 1952 and 1953. The dual Caulfield Cup and Melbourne Cup winner Rising Fast won in 1954. Redcraze, a 32-race winner and New Zealand champion, took out the Plate in 1957 as a seven-year-old, ridden by George Moore. Noholme took nearly a second off the race record in a front-running display to win in 1959.

Tulloch, who is often compared to Phar Lap and Carbine, won the following year and again set a new race record. Tobin Bronze became a dual winner of the race with victories in 1966 and 1967. The 1969 Cox Plate was won by the New Zealand three-year-old colt Daryl's Joy, who went on to race successfully in the USA. The popular Goondiwindi grey, Gunsynd, was trainer Tommy Smith's third winner of the Cox Plate in 1972, and the New Zealand Derby winner Fury's Order staggered to victory on a bog track in 1975. Surround became the first three-year-old filly to win the race in 1976, when she defeated the VRC Derby winner Unaware.

The ill-fated Dulcify strode away to win by seven lengths in 1979. He later started favourite in the Melbourne Cup but was put down after breaking a pelvis during the race. One of only two triple winners of the Cox Plate, Kingston Town, won in 1980, 1981 and 1982. On each occasion he was ridden by a different jockey: Malcolm Johnston in 1980, Ron Quinton in 1981, and Peter Cook in 1982. After winning in 1983, Strawberry Road raced in Europe and the US, where he ran fifth in the Prix de l'Arc de Triomphe at Longchamp and third to Seattle Song in the 1984 Washington, D.C. International at Laurel. In 1984, Red Anchor became trainer T.J. Smith's seventh Cox Plate winner. The 1986 Cox Plate was a two-horse war over the final 800 metres before Bonecrusher triumphed over Our Waverley Star by a neck. This encounter became known as the Race of the Century.

Rubiton, the winner in 1987, went on to a successful stud career where he sired a future Cox Plate winner in Fields of Omagh. Better Loosen Up was 30 lengths from the lead, with 1000 metres to run, before winning the 1990 Plate in record time. He later became the first – and remains the only – Australian horse to win the Japan Cup. The eight-year-old Super Impose won in 1992 and defeated a top-class field which included Better Loosen Up, Let's Elope and favourite Naturalism, who lost his rider. Naturalism went on to run second in the Japan Cup. Australian Horse of the Year Octagonal defeated Mahogany in 1995, while Saintly gave Bart Cummings his second winner of the race in 1996 and Dane Ripper his third winner the following year. The 'People's Champion' Might and Power led throughout to win in 1998, setting a new track record not to be broken for 17 years.

In a front-running display, Sunline won the 1999 Cox Plate and returned in 2000 to win again by seven lengths (equalling Dulcify's winning margin), before West Australian champion Northerly defeated her in 2001 and 2002. In 2004, Savabeel became the first 3-year-old to win since Octagonal. In 2005, Makybe Diva triumphed and 10 days later became one of the most popular horses in Australian racing history with an unprecedented third Melbourne Cup win.

Fields of Omagh won his second Cox Plate in 2006, having already won in 2003, then finished second in 2004 and third behind Makybe Diva in 2005. In 2007, El Segundo won the Cox Plate, avenging his close defeat to Fields of Omagh the year before. In 2008, Maldivian led all the way to claim victory. So You Think, at just his fifth career start, was an easy winner in 2009, giving Bart Cummings his fourth training victory in the race.

In 2013, Shamus Award recorded his first career win in the Cox Plate, a unique achievement for a WFA race of such high standing. He gained a start only due to the scratching of the favourite, Atlantic Jewel.

Winx won in 2015 as a 4-year-old mare, setting a new track record. She returned in 2016 when the field included the Godolphin star Hartnell. Winx and Hartnell were close at the home bend before Winx accelerated away to score by a record-breaking margin of eight lengths. In 2017, the champion mare started the Cox Plate as the shortest-priced favourite since Phar Lap at $1.10, aiming for her 22nd successive win. After a challenge in the final 200m from Humidor, Winx won, to join Kingston Town in becoming just the second triple winner of the race, setting a new track record of 2 min 2.94. In 2018 Winx won an unprecedented fourth Cox Plate.

=== Gallery of noted winners ===
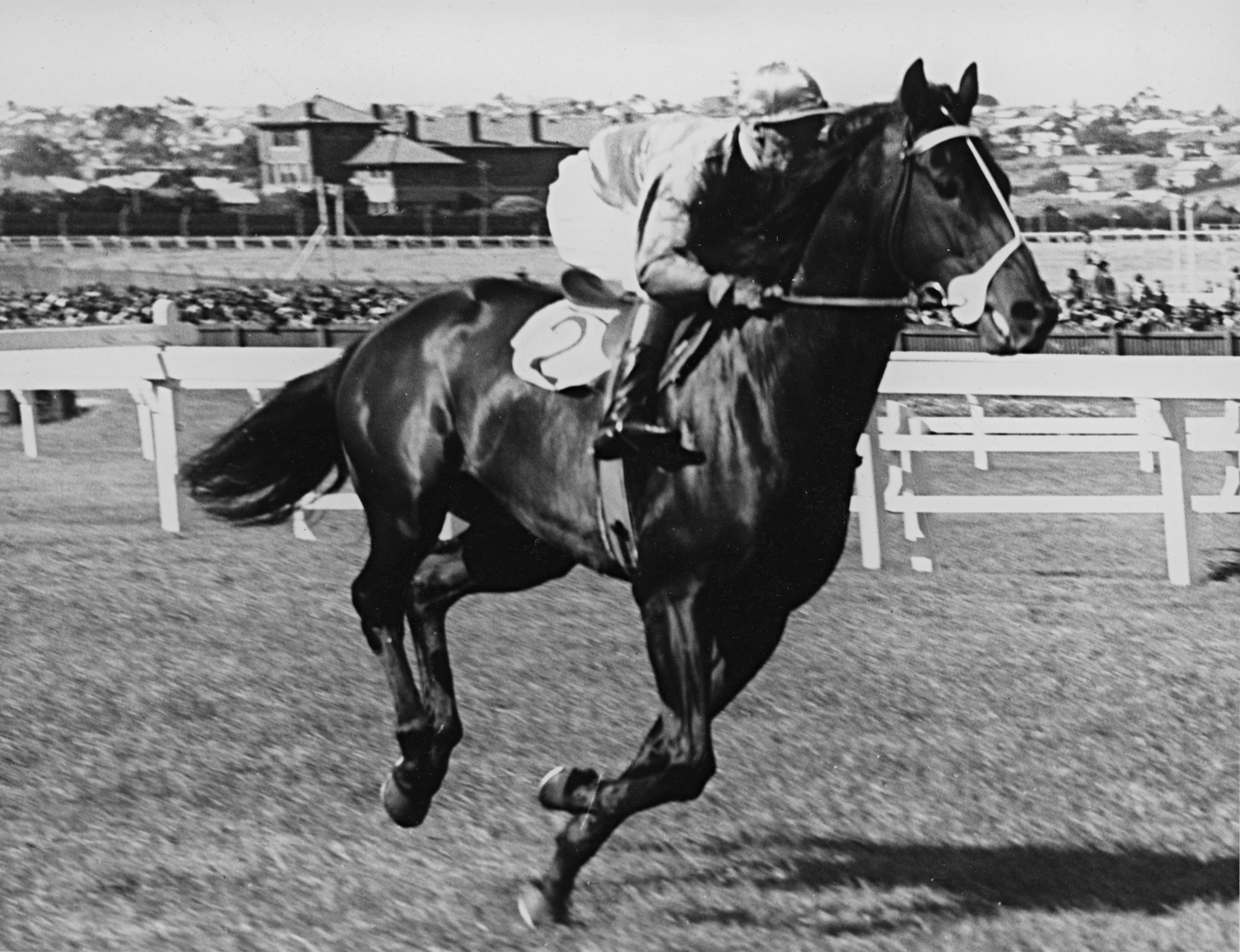
Beau Vite, 1940 and 1941 winner

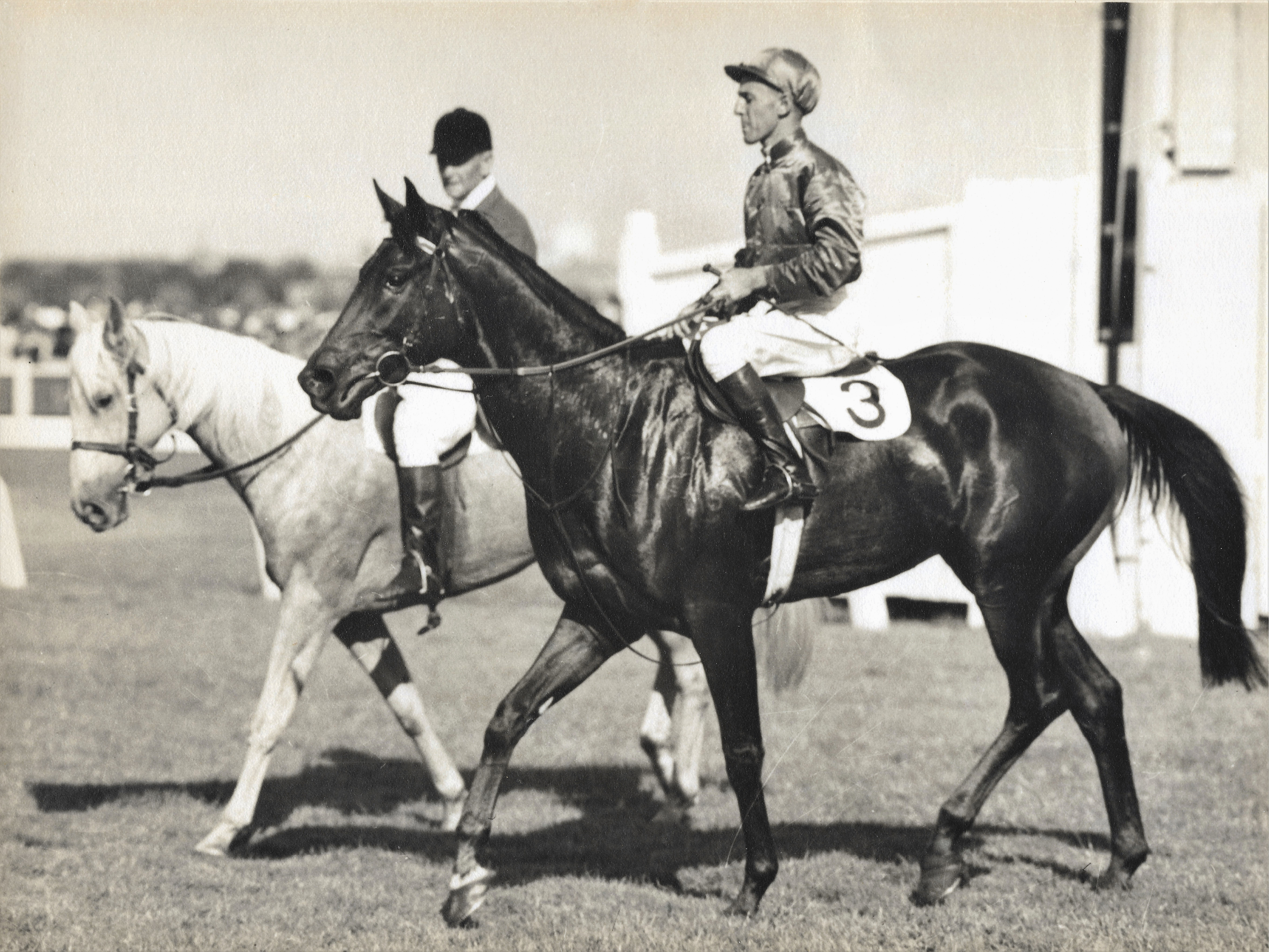
Delta, 1949 winner

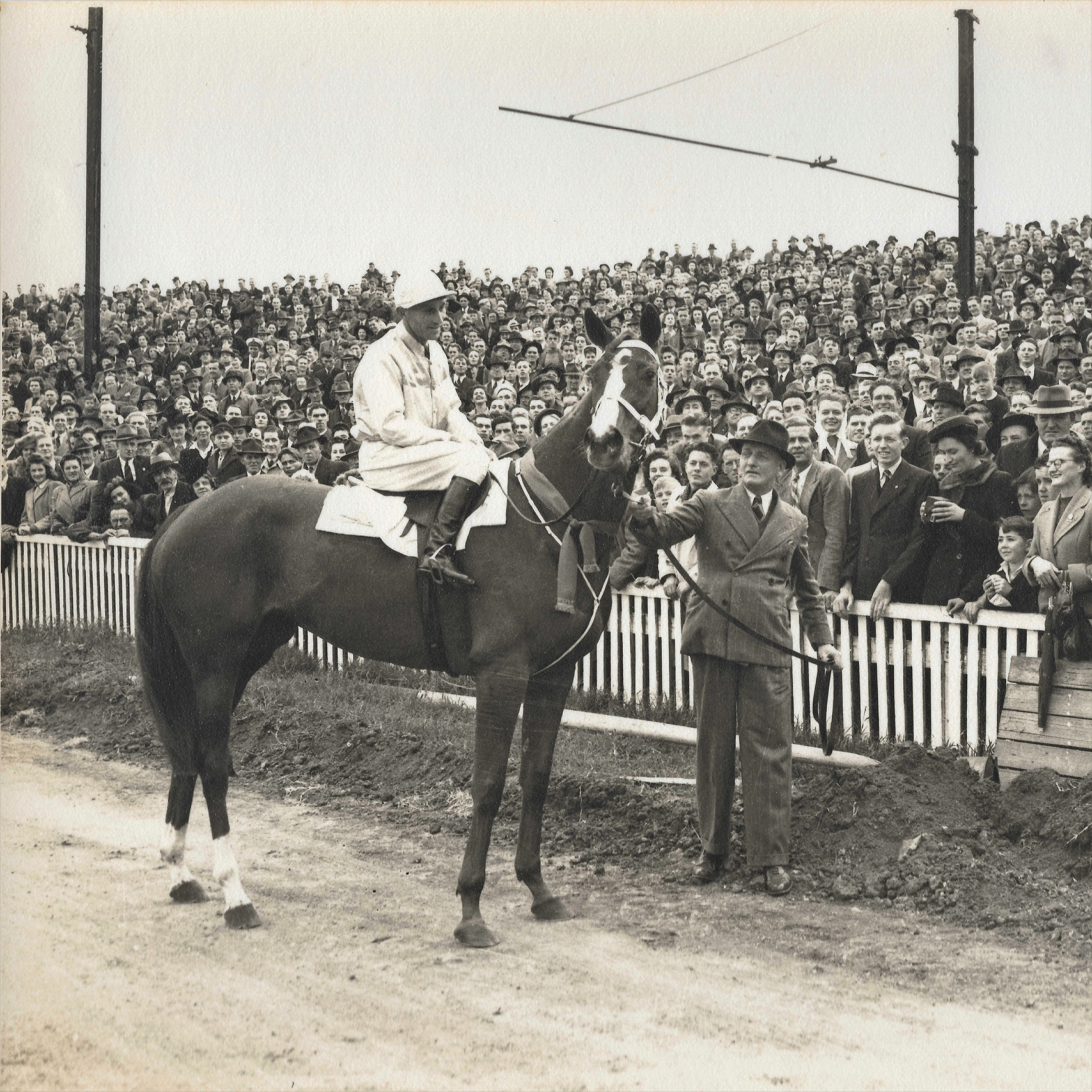
Tranquil Star, 1942 and 1944 winner

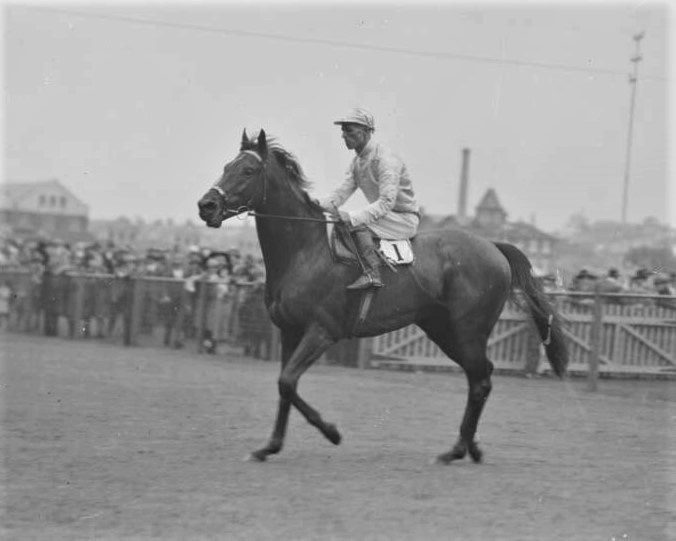
Chatham, 1932 and 1934 winner

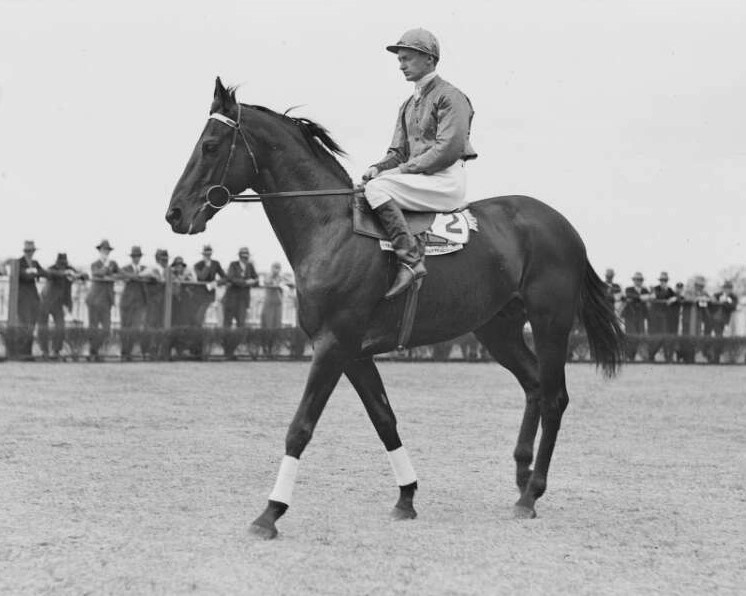
Nightmarch, 1929 winner

== Past winners ==
For a list of Cox Plate winning horses, see List of Cox Plate winners.

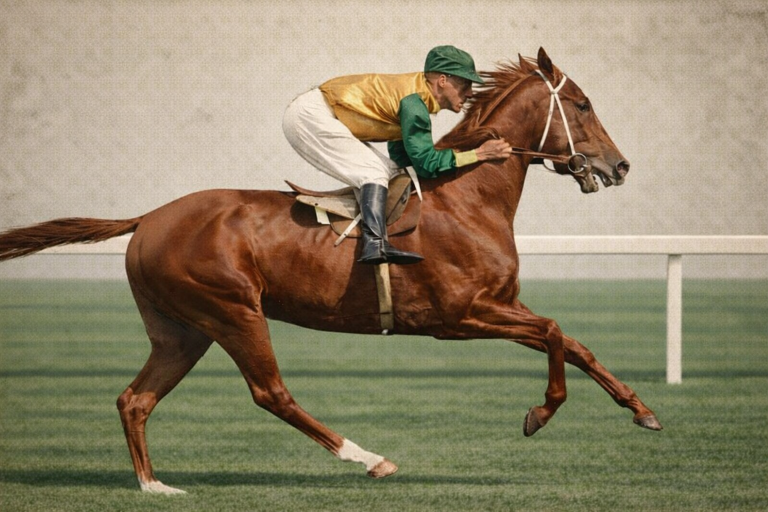
Heroic, 1926 winner

Hydrogen, 1953 winner

== Favourites record ==
The favourite in the Cox Plate has an overall win rate of 41%. Favourites starting at less than $2.00 (Even money – 1/1) have a win rate of 70%. Phar Lap has the record of shortest favourite at $1.07 (1/14 on) in 1931. More recently, Winx started favourite at $1.10 (1/10 on) in 2017 on her way to winning her record-equalling third Cox Plate; additionally, at her record-breaking fourth win in 2018, she started at $1.20.

Year	Favourite	Price	Finish
2026	Aeliana	$4.20	3
2025	Via Sistina	2.25	1
2024	Prognosis	3.40	2
2023	Romantic Warrior	3.70	1
2022	Anamoe	2.40	1
2021	Verry Elleegant	3.60	3
2020	Russian Camelot	3.50	3
2019	Lys Gracieux	2.50	1
2018	Winx	1.20	1
2017	Winx	1.10	1
2016	Winx	1.70	1
2015	Winx	4.60	1
2014	Fawkner	4.50	2
2013	Dundeel	4.00	8
2012	Green Moon	5.00	7
2011	Helmet	3.30	8
2010	So You Think	1.50	1
2009	So You Think	2.80	6
2008	Samantha Miss	4.50	3
2007	Miss Finland	4.00	4
2006	Racing To Win	3.75	11
2005	Makybe Diva	2.00	1
2004	Elvstroem	4.20	8
2003	Lonhro	1.60	3
2002	Northerly	4.00*	1
2002	Lonhro	4.00*	6
2001	Sunline	2.75	2
2000	Sunline	2.38	1
1999	Redoute's Choice	4.50	5
1998	Might and Power	1.73	1
1997	Filante	2.38	2
1996	Filante	3.25*	2
1996	Juggler	3.25*	4
1995	Danewin	4.50*	9
1995	Our Maizcay	4.50*	14
1994	Jeune	4.00	13
1993	Naturalism	3.00	4
1992	Naturalism	2.00	LR
1991	Shaftesbury Avenue	2.50	12
1990	Better Loosen Up	3.00	1
1989	Almaarad	3.75	1
1988	Our Poetic Prince	2.25	1
1987	Rubiton	2.75	1
1986	Bonecrusher	1.90	1
1985	Drawn	4.50	3
1984	Red Anchor	1.73	1
1983	Sir Dapper	4.50*	5
1983	Strawberry Road	6.50	11
1982	Kingston Town	2.75	1
1981	Kingston Town	1.67	1
1980	Kingston Town	2.50	1
1979	Dulcify	2.75	1
1978	La Mer	2.75	6
1977	Luskin Star	2.75	9
1976	How Now	2.75	4
1975	Wave King	7.00	5
1974	Taras Bulba	3.50	2
1973	Young Ida	5.00	7
1972	Gunsynd	2.50	1
1971	Igloo	3.75	2
1970	Gay Poss	2.75	6
1969	Ben Lomond	2.75	2
1968	Rajah Sahib	2.75	1

Year	Favourite	Price	Finish
1967	Tobin Bronze	1.17	1
1966	Tobin Bronze	1.90	1
1965	Winfreux	2.38	2
1964	Strauss	3.50	5
1963	Sometime	2.25	3
1962	Aquanita	1.80	1
1961	Sky High	1.44	3
1960	Tulloch	3.00	1
1959	Travel Boy	3.50	6
1958	Prince Darius	3.00	4
1957	Prince Darius	2.11	2
1956	Rising Fast	2.75	2
1955	Rising Fast	2.50	6
1954	Rising Fast	2.38	1
1953	Carioca	3.25	5
1952	Hydrogen	2.38	1
1951	Hydrogen	2.25	2
1950	Delta	2.38	5
1949	Comic Court	2.25	2
1948	Phoibos	2.50	2
1947	Royal Gem	2.75	4
1946	Flying Duke	3.50	5
1946	St. Fairy	3.00	7
1945	Lawrence	1.90	4
1944	Lawrence	1.50	2
1943	Amana	3.50	1
1942	Great Britain	3.25	13
1941	Beau Vite	1.33	1
1940	Beau Vite	2.75	1
1939	High Caste	1.90	5
1938	Ajax	1.50	1
1937	Young Idea	3.00	1
1936	Mala	4.00	2
1935	Hall Mark	3.00	2
1934	Chatham	3.00	1
1933	Rogilla	1.53	4
1932	Chatham	2.11	1
1931	Phar Lap	1.07	1
1930	Phar Lap	1.14	1
1929	Nightmarch	2.25	1
1928	Ramulus	4.00*	2
1928	Amounis	4.00*	7
1927	Amounis	4.00*	1
1927	Gothic	4.00*	3
1926	Heroic	1.80	1
1925	Manfred	1.80	1
1924	Whittier	2.50	2
1923	Easingwold	2.50	1
1922	Tangalooma	2.50	6

- Price: * indicates equal favourite.

== Attendance ==
- 2003 – 30,109
- 2004 – 32,187
- 2005 – 44,189
- 2006 – 34,256
- 2007 – 34,561
- 2008 – 34,000
- 2009 – 31,000
- 2010 – 31,546
- 2011 – 30,000
- 2013 – 30,986
- 2014 – 28,216
- 2015 – 27,620
- 2016 – 26,000
- 2017 – 32,617
- 2018 – 38,035
- 2019 – 24,648
- 2020 – 0 (no public attendance due to COVID-19 pandemic restrictions)
- 2021 – 0 (no public attendance due to COVID-19 pandemic restrictions)
- 2022 – 19,000
- 2023 – 21,021

== See also ==
- Crystal Mile (Kia Ora Stud Mile)
- Moonee Valley Gold Cup
- Moonee Valley Vase (Drummond Golf Vase)
- McEwen Stakes
- Red Anchor Stakes
- Tesio Stakes
- List of Australian Group races
- Australian horse-racing
- Group races
- Melbourne Spring Racing Carnival
