= Moonee Valley Racecourse =

Horse racing track in Melbourne, Victoria, Australia

Coordinates: 37.765444°S 144.931002°E

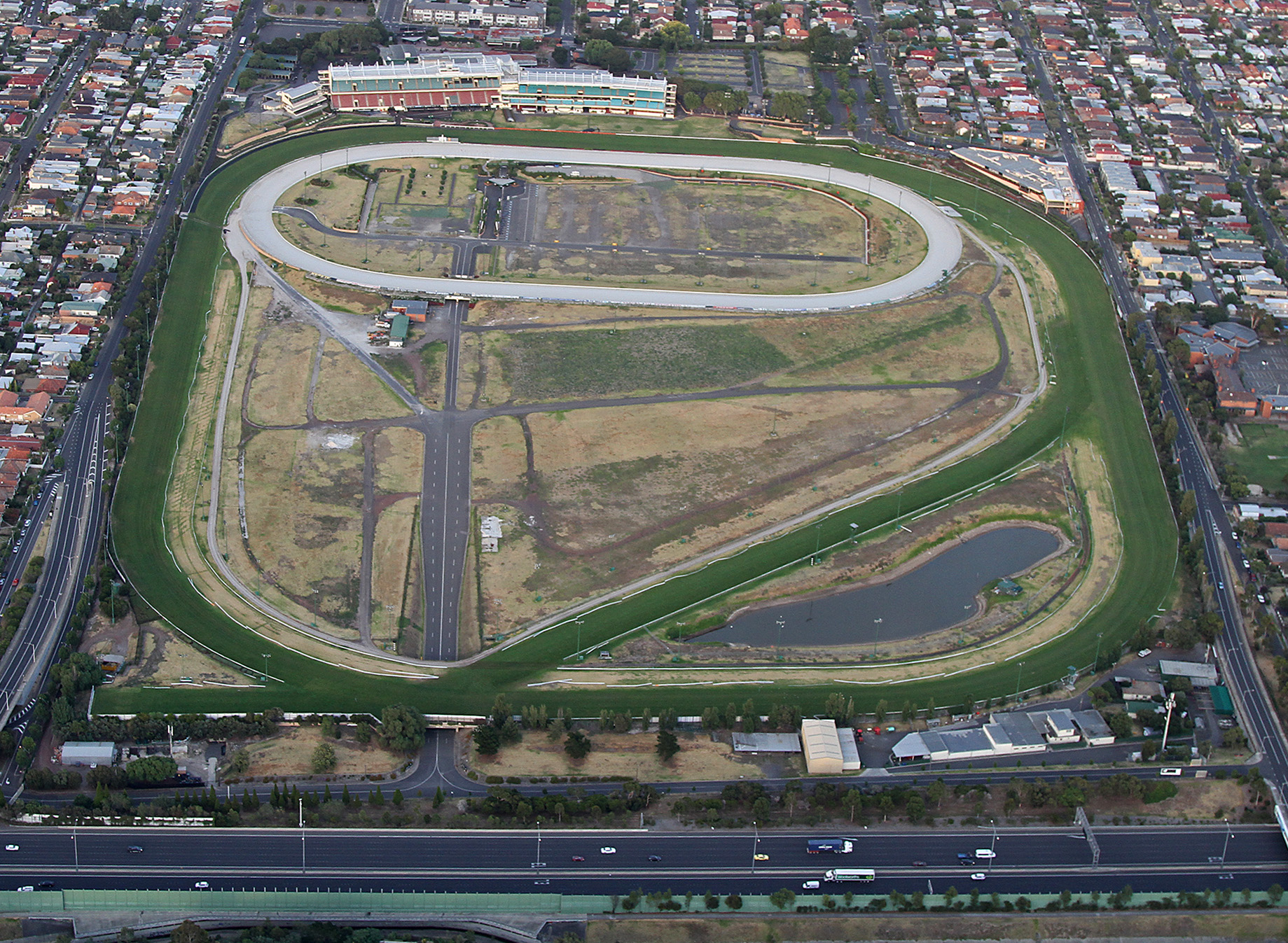
- Aerial view of Moonee Valley Racecourse, looking west
- Location: Moonee Ponds, Victoria
- Owned by: Moonee Valley Racing Club
- Date opened: 1883; 142 years ago
- Screened on: Seven Network; Sky Racing
- Notable races: Cox Plate

Moonee Valley Racecourse, currently marketed as The Valley, is a horse-racing track in Moonee Ponds, Melbourne, Victoria, Australia.

== History ==
Moonee Valley Racecourse was established in 1883 by William Samuel (W.S.) Cox, who purchased a farm the previous year belonging to John F. Feehan for the purpose of establishing a racetrack. Being entirely freehold land owned by a private club, this separates Moonee Valley from other Melbourne racecourses such as Caulfield and Flemington. Expansion of the racecourse facilities occurred in the 1960s, funded by compensation for land acquired for the construction of the adjacent Tullamarine Freeway. In the 1970s harness racing moved to the Valley, when night trotting relocated from the Royal Melbourne Showgrounds.

== Redevelopment ==
The racecourse will undergo an extensive redevelopment over the next two year and will see the site closed from late 2025 until August 2027.
