= Moonee Valley Racing Club =

The Moonee Valley Racing Club (MVRC) was founded by William Samuel (W.S.) Cox), in 1883 is located at The Valley Racecourse on McPherson Street, Moonee Ponds (a suburb of Melbourne, Victoria, Australia). It is one of three racing clubs in the Melbourne metropolitan area; the others are the Victoria Racing Club and the Melbourne Racing Club.
