= Ken Russell Memorial Classic =

- Class: Group 3
- Location: Gold Coast Racecourse; Surfers Paradise, Queensland, Australia
- Inaugurated: 1974; 52 years ago (as Gold Coast 2YO Classic)
- Race type: Thoroughbred - Flat racing
- Sponsor: TAB (2019-26)

Race information
- Distance: 1,200 metres
- Surface: Turf
- Track: Right-handed
- Qualification: Two-year-olds
- Weight: Set Weights colts and geldings – 57 kg fillies – 55 kg
- Purse: A$200,000 (2026)
- Bonuses: Winner ballot exempt from the J. J. Atkins

Ken Russell Memorial Classic is a Gold Coast Turf Club Group 3 Thoroughbred horse race for two-year-olds run at set weights over a distance of 1,200 metres (1,300 yd) at Gold Coast Racecourse, Surfers Paradise, Queensland, Australia in May.

== History ==
The race is named in honour of jockey Kenneth Charles Russell (1951–1993), who was killed in a race fall at Sydney's Rosehill Racecourse in 1993. He was leading rider at the Gold Coast Racecourse four times. His major wins were in the 1989 Doncaster Handicap, 1991 George Ryder Stakes as well as the Queensland Derby, Queensland Oaks, Goodwood Handicap.

=== Name ===
- 1974–1993 - Gold Coast 2YO Classic Handicap
- 1994–1995 - Ken Russell 2YO Classic Handicap
- 1996 - Laurie Bricknell 2YO Classic
- 1997–1998 - Ken Russell 2YO Classic Handicap
- 1999 onwards - Ken Russell Memorial Classic

=== Distance ===
- 1974–1999 - 1,400 metres
- 2000–2005 - 1,300 metres
- 2006 onwards - 1,200 metres

=== Grade ===
- 1984–2013 - Listed Race
- 2014 onwards - Group 3

=== Conditions ===
- Prior 1997 - Handicap
- 1997–2004 - Quality Handicap
- 2005 onwards - Set weights

=== Other venues ===
- 2023 & 2024 - Sunshine Coast Racecourse

=== Recent multiple winners ===
Trainers

- Noel Doyle in 2001, 2013 and 2014
- Peter Snowden in 2025 and in partnership with Paul Snowden in 2017 and 2019.

Jockeys

- Glenn Colless in 2003 and 2008
- Glenn Lynch in 2005 and 2006
- James McDonald in 2024 and 2025
- Nash Rawiller in 2011 and 2021
- Jason Taylor in 2001 and 2014.

== Winners ==
The following are past winners of the race.

- 2026 - St Gotthard
- 2025 - Beadman
- 2024 - Althoff
- 2023 - Russian Alliance
- 2022 - Nettuno
- 2021 - Subterranean
- 2020 - Wisdom Of Water
- 2019 - Stronger
- 2018 - Sesar
- 2017 - Taking Aim
- 2016 - Royal Tithe
- 2015 - Big Tree
- 2014 - Aimee
- 2013 - Le Val
- 2012 - Sizzling
- 2011 - Hot Snitzel
- 2010 - Spirit Of Boom
- 2009 - Facile Tigre
- 2008 - Cat D'Antibes
- 2007 - I Have No Fear
- 2006 - Gold Edition
- 2005 - Foolish
- 2004 - Midnight City
- 2003 - Victory Grove
- 2002 - Tequila Knowledge
- 2001 - Palidamah
- 2000 - Ombra Della Sera
- 1999 - Let's Compromise
- 1998 - King Lotto
- 1997 - Noble Challenge
- 1996 - Super Espion
- 1995 - War Baron
- 1994 - Brave Warrior
- 1993 - Pimpala Son
- 1992 - Surtee
- 1991 - Gad's Hill
- 1990 - Shot Of Comfort
- 1989 - race not held
- 1988 - Temple Front
- 1987 - Superb Effort
- 1986 - Tristram
- 1985 - Rass Flyer
- 1984 - Gypsy Circle
- 1983 - Riverdale
- 1982 - Carnarvon Bridge
- 1981 - Copperama
- 1980 - Royal Paree
- 1979 - Red Invader
- 1978 - Rey Moro
- 1977 - Pacific Prince
- 1976 - Romantic Dream
- 1975 - race not held
- 1974 - Dungunnin

== See also ==
- A D Hollindale Stakes
- Gold Coast Guineas
- List of Australian Group races
- Group races
