= Mr Brightside (horse) =

New Zealand-bred thoroughbred racehorse

Mr Brightside (NZ)
- Sire: Bullbars (Aus)
- Grandsire: Elusive Quality (USA)
- Dam: Lilahjay (NZ)
- Damsire: Tavistock (NZ)
- Sex: Gelding
- Foaled: 17 October 2017 (age 9)
- Country: New Zealand
- Colour: Brown
- Breeder: Ray I & the Estate of the late Martha Johnson
- Owner: Lindsay Park Bloodstock (S Steel), Green Shorts Racing (A Visalli), K Paisley, C Paisley, B Carson, M Andreadis, J Molinaro, A Molinaro, J Evans, D Hollyman, S Horn, R Jarvis, G Kerr, D Lee, R White, D Cavallo, The Fighting Cowboys (A Pettiona), P Presti, L Presti & Hunter Graeber Racing
- Trainer: Ben, Will & JD Hayes
- Jockey: Craig Williams, Luke Currie, Zac Purton
- Record: 51: 20–14–3
- Earnings: AU$18,741,137

Major wins
- John F. Feehan Stakes (2022); Doncaster Mile (2022, 2023); P B Lawrence Stakes (2022, 2023); All-Star Mile (2023); Memsie Stakes (2023); Makybe Diva Stakes (2023, 2024, 2025); C F Orr Stakes (2024); Futurity Stakes (2024, 2025); Champions Mile (2024)
- Last updated on 13 October 2026

Mr Brightside is a New Zealand-bred thoroughbred racehorse trained in Australia. He is notable for winning 10 Group One (G1) races. He is also famous for rarely running poorly and his very high place percentage, racing in the strongest class and distances in Australia for 4 consecutive seasons. He is also considered one of the best purchases in horse racing history, purchased for 7k and currently has earned more than 18 million over his career. He is named after The Killers's song Mr. Brightside.

== Background ==
Mr Brightside was bred by Ray Johnson in partnership with his late wife, Martha. He was sold as a yearling for $22,000 at the 2019 New Zealand Bloodstock May Sale, but failed to meet his $50,000 reserve when entered again at the New Zealand Bloodstock Ready to Run Sale. Later, Ray Johnson bought him back on gavelhouse.com for just $7,750 and the ownership was shared with Ralph Manning and Shaun Dromgool.

== Racing career ==
Mr Brightside was initially trained by Ralph Manning at Cambridge and on 10 February 2021 made his debut at Matamata in a $10,000 maiden race over 1400m. Ridden by champion jockey Opie Bosson, he was caught behind other runners and had to be satisfied with a 5th placing behind Comme Bella Fille.

He did not race again in New Zealand and on 31/03/2021 he was exported to Australia.

During his Australian racing career he has been trained by the Hayes brothers. His notable performances have included:

Date	Placing	Race	Jockey	1st	2nd	3rd
10/10/21	1st	Listed Bet with mates Cup	Craig Williams	Mr Brightside	Wicklow Town	Milton Park
30/10/21	4th	G1 Kennedy Cantala Stakes	Craig Williams	Superstorm	Icebath	Cascadian
5/03/22	4th	G2 Blamey Stakes	Craig Williams	Inspirational Girl	Zaaki	Corner Pocket
19/03/22	4th	All-Star Mile	Craig Williams	Zaaki	I'm Thunderstruck	Streets Of Avalon
2/04/22	1st	G1 Doncaster Handicap	Craig Williams	Mr Brightside	I'm Thunderstruck	Icebath
13/08/22	1st	G2 P B Lawrence Stakes	Craig Williams	Mr Brightside	I Am Superman	Buffalo River
3/09/22	1st	G2 Feehan Stakes	Craig Williams	Mr Brightside	Inspirational Girl	Spanish Mission
25/09/22	5th	G1 Underwood Stakes	Craig Williams	Alligator Blood	Mo'unga	Zaaki
8/10/22	4th	G1 Might and Power Stakes	Craig Williams	Anamoe	I'm Thunderstruck	Zaaki
22/10/22	7th	G1 Cox Plate	Craig Williams	Anamoe	I'm Thunderstruck	El Bodegon
5/11/22	3rd	G1 Kennedy Champions Mile	Craig Williams	Alligator Blood	Tuvalu	Mr Brightside
11/02/23	5th	G1 C F Orr Stakes	Craig Williams	Jacquinot	Gentleman Roy	Nugget
25/02/23	2nd	G1 Futurity Stakes (MRC)	Craig Williams	Alligator Blood	Mr Brightside	I'm Thunderstruck
18/03/23	1st	All-Star Mile	Luke Currie	Mr Brightside	Cascadian	The Inevitable
1/04/23	1st	G1 Doncaster Handicap	Zac Purton	Mr Brightside	My Oberon	Nugget
19/08/23	1st	G2 P B Lawrence Stakes	Craig Williams	Mr Brightside	Pinstriped	Aegon
2/09/23	1st	G1 Memsie Stakes	Craig Williams	Mr Brightside	Princess Grace	I Wish I Win
16/09/23	1st	G1 Makybe Diva Stakes	Craig Williams	Mr Brightside	Alligator Blood	Osipenko
14/10/23	2nd	G2 King Charles III Stakes	Craig Williams	Fangirl	Mr Brightside	My Oberon
28/10/23	2nd	G1 Cox Plate	Craig Williams	Romantic Warrior	Mr Brightside	Alligator Blood
11/11/23	2nd	G1 Kennedy Champions Mile	Craig Williams	Pride Of Jenni	Mr Brightside	Alligator Blood
10/02/24	1st	G1 C F Orr Stakes	Craig Williams	Mr Brightside	Pride Of Jenni	Buffalo River
24/02/24	1st	G1 Futurity Stakes (MRC)	Craig Williams	Mr Brightside	Pericles	Buffalo River
16/03/24	2nd	All-Star Mile	Craig Williams	Pride Of Jenni	Mr Brightside	Cascadian
30/03/24	5th	G1 Australian Cup	Craig Williams	Cascadian	Pride Of Jenni	Atishu
13/04/24	3rd	G1 Queen Elizabeth Stakes (ATC)	Craig Williams	Pride Of Jenni	Via Sistina	Mr Brightside
31/08/24	2nd	G1 Memsie Stakes	Craig Williams	Pinstriped	Mr Brightside	Gentleman Roy
14/09/24	1st	G1 Makybe Diva Stakes	Craig Williams	Mr Brightside	Pride Of Jenni	Antino
27/09/24	2nd	G2 Feehan Stakes	Craig Williams	Pride Of Jenni	Mr Brightside	Antino
12/10/24	2nd	G1 Might And Power	Craig Williams	Deny Knowledge	Mr Brightside	Atishu
26/10/24	4th	G1 Cox Plate	Craig Williams	Via Sistina	Prognosis	Broadsiding
9/11/24	1st	G1 Kennedy Champions Mile	Craig Williams	Mr Brightside	Antino	Fangirl
8/02/25	2nd	G1 C F Orr Stakes	Craig Williams	Another Wil	Mr Brightside	Steparty
22/02/25	1st	G1 Futurity Stakes	Craig Williams	Mr Brightside	Tom Kitten	I Wish I Win
8/03/25	2nd	G1 All-Star Mile	Craig Williams	Tom Kitten	Mr Brightside	Light Infantry Man
30/8/25	2nd	G1 Memsie Stakes	Craig Williams	Treasurethe Moment	Mr Brightside	Buckaroo
13/9/25	1st	G1 Makybe Diva Stakes	Craig Williams	Mr Brightside	Aeliana	Via Sistina
18/10/25	2nd	G1 King Charles III Stakes	Craig Williams	Ceowulf	Mr Brightside	Pier

== Pedigree ==
Pedigree of Mr Brightside (NZ) 2019
Sire Bullbars (AUS) 2007	Elusive Quality (USA); 1993	Gone West (USA); 1984	Mr. Prospector (USA); 1970
Sire Bullbars (AUS) 2007	Elusive Quality (USA); 1993	Gone West (USA); 1984	Secrettame (USA); 1978
Sire Bullbars (AUS) 2007	Elusive Quality (USA); 1993	Touch Of Greatness (USA); 1986	Hero's Honor (USA); 1980
Sire Bullbars (AUS) 2007	Elusive Quality (USA); 1993	Touch Of Greatness (USA); 1986	Ivory Wand (USA); 1973
Sire Bullbars (AUS) 2007	Accessories (GB); 2003	Singspiel (IRE); 1992	In The Wings (GB); 1986
Sire Bullbars (AUS) 2007	Accessories (GB); 2003	Singspiel (IRE); 1992	Glorious Song (CAN); 1976
Sire Bullbars (AUS) 2007	Accessories (GB); 2003	Anna Matrushka (GB); 1984	Mill Reef (USA); 1968
Sire Bullbars (AUS) 2007	Accessories (GB); 2003	Anna Matrushka (GB); 1984	Anna Paola (GER); 1978
Dam Lilahjay (NZ) 2012	Tavistock (NZ); 2005	Montjeu (IRE); 1996	Sadler's Wells (USA); 1981
Dam Lilahjay (NZ) 2012	Tavistock (NZ); 2005	Montjeu (IRE); 1996	Floripedes (FR); 1985
Dam Lilahjay (NZ) 2012	Tavistock (NZ); 2005	Upstage (GB); 1998	Quest For Fame (GB); 1987
Dam Lilahjay (NZ) 2012	Tavistock (NZ); 2005	Upstage (GB); 1998	Pedestral (GB); 1986
Dam Lilahjay (NZ) 2012	Keepable (NZ); 2003	Keeper (AUS); 1997	Danehill (USA); 1986
Dam Lilahjay (NZ) 2012	Keepable (NZ); 2003	Keeper (AUS); 1997	Nuwirah (USA); 1987
Dam Lilahjay (NZ) 2012	Keepable (NZ); 2003	Delia's Choice (NZ); 1987	Sir Tristram (IRE); 1971
Dam Lilahjay (NZ) 2012	Keepable (NZ); 2003	Delia's Choice (NZ); 1987	Taiona (NZ); 1972
