= Gold Coast Guineas =

Horse race in Queensland, Australia

- Class: Group 3
- Location: Gold Coast Racecourse; Surfers Paradise, Queensland, Australia
- Inaugurated: 2000
- Race type: Thoroughbred - Flat racing
- Sponsor: Brandons (2018-26)

Race information
- Distance: 1,200 metres
- Surface: Turf
- Track: Right-handed
- Qualification: Three-year-olds
- Weight: Set Weights colts and geldings – 57kg fillies – 55kg
- Purse: A$200,000 (2026)

The Gold Coast Guineas is a Gold Coast Turf Club Group 3 Australian Thoroughbred horse race for three-year-olds, under set weights conditions, over a distance of 1200 metres at Gold Coast Racecourse, Surfers Paradise, Queensland, Australia during the Queensland Winter Racing Carnival.

== History ==
The inaugural running of the race was in March 2000 over a distance of 1400 metres. The race is now part of the Prime Minister's Cup racecard in May.

=== Distance ===
- 2000–2005 – 1400 metres
- 2006 onwards - 1200 metres

=== Other venues ===
- 2023 & 2024 - Sunshine Coast Racecourse

=== Grade ===
- 2006–2007 - Listed race
- 2008 onwards - Group 3

== Winners ==
The following are past winners of the race.

- 2026 - Beadman
- 2025 - Bosustow
- 2024 - Corniche
- 2023 - Yellow Brick
- 2022 - Prince Of Boom
- 2021 - Marboosha
- 2020 - Hightail
- 2019 - Pennino
- 2018 - Champagne Cuddles
- 2017 - Savanna Amour
- 2016 - Takedown
- 2015 - Nostradamus
- 2014 - Dothraki
- 2013 - Academus
- 2012 - Florentina
- 2011 - Military Rose
- 2010 - Beethog
- 2009 - Chakvetadze
- 2008 - El Cambio
- 2007 - Gold Edition
- 2006 - Fashions Afield
- 2005 - Eremein
- 2004 - King's Chapel
- 2003 - Tahitian Star
- 2002 - Miss Bussell
- 2001 - Ceffyl
- 2000 - Make Mine Magic

== See also ==
- A D Hollindale Stakes
- Ken Russell Memorial Classic
- List of Australian Group races
- Group races
