= Via Sistina =

Irish bred thoroughbred racehorse

- Sire: Fastnet Rock
- Grandsire: Danehill
- Dam: Nigh
- Damsire: Galileo
- Sex: Mare
- Foaled: 27 March 2018
- Country: Ireland
- Colour: Bay
- Breeder: Laundry Cottage Stud Farm
- Owner: Yulong Investments
- Trainer: George Boughey (2021-2023); Chris Waller (2024 onwards)
- Record: 29: 16-4-5
- Earnings: A$19,402,488

Major wins
- Prix Fille de l'Air (2022); Dahlia Stakes (2023); Pretty Polly Stakes (2023); Ranvet Stakes (2024, 2025); Winx Stakes (2024, 2025); Turnbull Stakes (2024); W.S. Cox Plate (2024, 2025); Champions Stakes (2024, 2025); Queen Elizabeth Stakes (2025)

Awards
- Australian Champion Racehorse of the Year (2024/25); Australian Champion Middle Distance Racehorse (2024/25); Timeform rating: 132

Via Sistina (foaled 27 March 2018) is a twelve-time Group 1 winning Irish bred Thoroughbred racehorse who is most notable for her victories in the 2024 and 2025 W.S. Cox Plate. She was retired after winning her second Champions Stakes in her last race. After her victory in the 2024 W.S. Cox Plate, Via Sistina was awarded a Timeform rating of 132, the third highest ever given to a mare. Additionally, Via Sistina earned a Longines rating of 127, which placed her third in the 2024 World's Best Racehorse Rankings.

== Background ==
Via Sistina was sired out of Fastnet Rock, a champion racehorse whose best wins include the Lightning Stakes and the Oakleigh Plate. Fastnet Rock was a successful stallion siring 44 Group 1 winners including Avantage, Atlantic Jewel, Merchant Navy, and Fascinating Rock. Via Sistina's grandsire Danehill was also a prolific sire, as he was the leading sire in Australia nine times, the leading sire in Great Britain three times, and the leading sire in France twice.

Via Sistina originally raced in the UK under trainer Joseph Tuite before switching to George Boughey. She found early success in Britain claiming five wins in thirteen starts before being sold in the Tattersalls December Mare Sale in 2023 to Yulong Studs to train under Chris Waller. In 2024, Yulong Investments acquired Panthalassa, an international Group 1 race winner and one of the richest racehorses in the world. In addition to running a successful thoroughbred enterprise, Yulong Investments also has a division focusing on premium Wagyu beef. In 2022, Yulong Investments purchased a female Wagyu cow for A$400,000, a record high auction price.

== Notable races ==
Date	Race	Track	Field	Placing	Winner (2nd Place)	Winning (Losing) Margin	Jockey
2022 – Four-year-old season
11 November 2022	G3 - Prix Fille de l'Air	Toulouse	11	1st	(Winema)	1/2 length	Jamie Spencer
2023 – Five-year-old season
7 May 2023	G2 - Dahlia Stakes	Newmarket	9	1st	(Al Husn)	6 lengths	Jamie Spencer
1 July 2023	G1 - Pretty Polly Stakes	Curragh	9	1st	(Stay Alert)	2 lengths	Jamie Spencer
2024 – Six-year-old season
23 March 2024	G1 - Ranvet Stakes	Rosehill	6	1st	(Place Du Carrousel)	1.2 lengths	James McDonald
13 April 2024	G1 - Queen Eizabeth Stakes	Randwick	9	2nd	Pride Of Jenni	(6.54 lengths)	James McDonald
24 August 2024	G1 - Winx Stakes	Randwick	12	1st	(Zougotcha)	0.07 lengths	Kerrin McEvoy
5 October 2024	G1 - Turnbull Stakes	Flemington	16	1st	(Buckaroo)	0.2 lengths	Damian Lane
26 October 2024	G1 - Cox Plate	Moonee Valley	9	1st	(Prognosis)	8 lengths	James McDonald
9 November 2024	G1 - Champions Stakes	Flemington	11	1st	(Atishu)	2.75 lengths	James McDonald
2025 – Seven-year-old season
15 February 2025	G2 - Apollo Stakes	Randwick	8	3rd	Fangirl	(1.02 lengths)	Kerrin McEvoy
1 March 2025	G1 - Verry Elleegant Stakes	Randwick	8	1st	(Fangirl)	0.36 lengths	James McDonald
22 March 2025	G1 - Ranvet Stakes	Rosehill	6	1st	(Lindermann)	1.53 lengths	James McDonald
12 April 2025	G1 - Queen Eizabeth Stakes	Randwick	13	1st	(Dubai Honour)	1.75 lengths	James McDonald
23 August 2025	G1 - Winx Stakes	Randwick	11	1st	(Aeliana)	0.36 lengths	James McDonald
13 September 2025	G1 - Makybe Diva Stakes	Flemington	6	3rd	Mr Brightside	(1.9 lengths)	James McDonald
4 October 2025	G1 - Turnbull Stakes	Flemington	14	3rd	Sir Delius	(2.21 lengths)	James McDonald
25 October 2025	G1 - Cox Plate	Moonee Valley	8	1st	(Buckaroo)	0.1 lengths	James McDonald
8 November 2025	G1 - Champions Stakes	Flemington	11	1st	(Zambardo)	2.75 lengths	James McDonald

== Pedigree ==
Pedigree of Via Sistina (IRE) 2018
Sire Fastnet Rock (AUS) 2001	Danehill (USA); 1986	Danzig	Northern Dancer
Sire Fastnet Rock (AUS) 2001	Danehill (USA); 1986	Danzig	Pas De Nom
Sire Fastnet Rock (AUS) 2001	Danehill (USA); 1986	Razyana	His Majesty
Sire Fastnet Rock (AUS) 2001	Danehill (USA); 1986	Razyana	Spring Adieu
Sire Fastnet Rock (AUS) 2001	Piccadilly Circus (AUS); 1995	Royal Academy	Nijinsky
Sire Fastnet Rock (AUS) 2001	Piccadilly Circus (AUS); 1995	Royal Academy	Crimson Saint
Sire Fastnet Rock (AUS) 2001	Piccadilly Circus (AUS); 1995	Gatana	Marauding
Sire Fastnet Rock (AUS) 2001	Piccadilly Circus (AUS); 1995	Gatana	Twigalae
Dam Nigh (IRE) 2010	Galileo (IRE); 1998	Sadlers Wells	Northern Dancer
Dam Nigh (IRE) 2010	Galileo (IRE); 1998	Sadlers Wells	Fairy Bridge
Dam Nigh (IRE) 2010	Galileo (IRE); 1998	Urban Sea	Miswaki
Dam Nigh (IRE) 2010	Galileo (IRE); 1998	Urban Sea	Allegretta
Dam Nigh (IRE) 2010	Native Force (IRE); 1998	Indian Ridge	Ahonoora
Dam Nigh (IRE) 2010	Native Force (IRE); 1998	Indian Ridge	Hillbrow
Dam Nigh (IRE) 2010	Native Force (IRE); 1998	La Pellegrina	Be My Guest
Dam Nigh (IRE) 2010	Native Force (IRE); 1998	La Pellegrina	Spanish Habit
