= All-Star Mile =

- Class: Group 1
- Location: Flemington Racecourse, Caulfield Racecourse and The Valley
- Inaugurated: 2019
- Race type: Thoroughbred flat

Race information
- Distance: 1,600 metres
- Surface: Turf
- Purse: $2.5 million (2025)

The All-Star Mile is an Australian thoroughbred horse race run over 1,600 metres that is run in Melbourne, Australia in March each year. It is run under Weight for Age conditions for open class horses.

== History ==
The race was run for the first time in 2019.

It is currently raced at Flemington Racecourse but was previously rotated between Flemington, Caulfield Racecourse or The Valley.

In the initial years the public voted to determining most of the field that competes in the race each year. Owners and trainers had to nominate their horses in January and then the public voted for which horses should be in the starting line up.

From 2024 the selection of the All-Star Mile field became a mixture of ‘Win and You're In' races and wildcards with a maximum field of 16 starters. The eight races where the winner can gain automatic entry are:

- Sir Rupert Clarke Stakes, Caulfield
- Magic Millions 3YO Guineas, Gold Coast
- TAB Karaka Million 3YO Classic, Ellerslie Racecourse
- Elsdon Park Aotearoa Classic, Ellerslie
- C.F. Orr Stakes, Caulfield
- Futurity Stakes – Caulfield
- Australian Guineas, Flemington
- Blamey Stakes, Flemington

== Results ==
Year	Venue	Winner	Age/Gender	Jockey	Trainer	Time	Second	Third
2026	Flemington	Tom Kitten	5yo Gelding	Craig Williams	James Cummings	1:33.73	Evaporate	Pride Of Jenni
2025	Flemington	Tom Kitten	4yo Gelding	Ben Melham	James Cummings	1:35.94	Mr Brightside	Light Infantry Man
2024	Caulfield	Pride Of Jenni	6yo Mare	Declan Bates	Ciaron Maher	1:35.22	Mr Brightside	Cascadian
2023	The Valley	Mr Brightside	5yo Gelding	Luke Currie	Ben & J D Hayes	1:34.47	Cascadian	The Inevitable
2022	Flemington	Zaaki (GB)	7yo Gelding	Jamie Kah	Annabel Neasham	1:36.54	I'm Thunderstruck	Streets of Avalon
2021	The Valley	Mugatoo (Ire)	6yo Gelding	Hugh Bowman	Kris Lees	1:39.82	Russian Camelot	Behemoth
2020	Caulfield	Regal Power	4yo Gelding	William Pike	Grant & Alana Williams	1:36.57	Superstorm	Melody Belle
2019	Flemington	Mystic Journey	3yo Filly	Anthony Darmanin	Adam Trindler	1:34.77	Hartnell	Alizee

== See also ==
- Golden Eagle
- The Everest
- List of Australian Group races
