= Russian Camelot =

Ireland-bred Thoroughbred racehorse

- Sire: Camelot
- Grandsire: Montjeu
- Dam: Lady Babooshka
- Damsire: Cape Cross
- Sex: Colt
- Foaled: 29 March 2017
- Country: Ireland
- Colour: Bay or brown
- Breeder: Camas Park Stud
- Owner: J R Wheeler, G L Mcrostie, QLD Cup Colts, B A Ainsworth, J & Mrs S Kanga, M P Edwards & M G Ford
- Trainer: Danny O'Brien
- Jockey: Damien Oliver
- Record: 10: 4-3-1
- Earnings: A$1,626,225

Major wins
- South Australian Derby (2020); Underwood Stakes (2020)
- Last updated on 26 September 2020

Russian Camelot (foaled 29 March 2017) is a multiple Group 1 winning Thoroughbred racehorse bred in Ireland and raced in Australia.

== Career ==
Russian Camelot made his debut at Ballarat on 11 October 2019, jumping at $4.60 and winning by 2 lengths. Jockey Damien Oliver said, "I've trialled him and he's trialled like a nice horse, but because he's six months behind, being a European two-year-old, we haven't really tried him hard as such. He's a great looking horse and he's always given you the feel of a nice horse, but it's always nice to see it there when you ask them for the effort and they do respond."

A month later, Russian Camelot contested a listed race, finishing second. Trainer O'Brien said, "He ran super, he's still inexperienced and it was his second start. He got to the front, probably just floated a little bit, and he found a better horse on the day."

After a spell, Russian Camelot returned in March 2020, but his "poor barrier manners" saw him jump poorly and finish 4th. On 4 April, he was scratched after rearing in the barriers and dislodging Oliver. Due to the scratching, he raced at Pakenham 5 days later, winning by seven lengths in an "effortless victory".

Next was the Group 1 South Australian Derby. Due to the COVID-19 pandemic in Australia, Oliver was unable to travel to South Australia without entering isolation and John Allen was given the ride. A shortening favourite and the youngest horse in the field, he settled without cover at the back of the field before coming down the middle of the track for victory. O'Brien said, "We've had him since he was a yearling and this was a race that we've been aiming him at for the better part of 12 months. He's turned up and delivered. It's very satisfying. It's never been done before - a northern hemisphere horse has never won a Derby in Australia. I don't think one has ever run? We were very confident going into today that there were no excuses. He'd had everything we needed to do to get him right today."

Russian Camelot resumed racing from a spell with a second placing in the Makybe Diva Stakes. On the 26 September 2020 he was successful in winning his second Group 1 when an odds-on favourite in the Underwood Stakes at Caulfield.

Russian Camelot started $3.50 favorite and ran 3rd in the 2020 Cox Plate, followed up with an 8th in the Melbourne Cup the same year.

In 2021 he ran 2nd in the All-Star Mile, a race which proved to be his last as a tendon injury forced him into early retirement.

In the 2020 World's Best Racehorse Rankings, Russian Camelot was rated on 118, making him the equal 80th best racehorse in the world.
