= Pride Of Jenni =

Australian bred thoroughbred racehorse

- Sire: Pride Of Dubai
- Grandsire: Street Cry
- Dam: Sancerre
- Damsire: O'Reilly
- Sex: Mare
- Foaled: 21 August 2017
- Country: Australia
- Colour: Bay
- Breeder: Trelawney Stud
- Owner: T, M & L Ottobre
- Trainer: David Brideoake (2020); Symon Wilde (2021); Ciaron Maher & David Eustace (2022-2023); Ciaron Maher (2024)
- Jockey: Declan Bates
- Record: 49: 14-11-4
- Earnings: A$$12,818,685

Major wins
- Empire Rose Stakes (2023 & 2025); Cantala Stakes (2023); All-Star Mile (2024); Queen Elizabeth Stakes (2024); Feehan Stakes (2024,2025,2026); Peter Young Stakes (2025); A D Hollindale Stakes (2026)

Awards
- Australian Champion Racehorse of the Year (2023/24); Australian Champion Middle Distance Racehorse (2023/24)

Pride Of Jenni (foaled 21 August 2017) is a Group 1 winning Australian bred Thoroughbred racehorse and broodmare who was named Australian Champion Racehorse of the Year in 2024.

== Background ==
Bred by Cambridge thoroughbred nursery Trelawney Stud, Pride Of Jenni was sold through Segenhoe Stud's 2019 Inglis Classic Yearling Sale draft for $100,000 to Tony and Lyn Ottobre's Cape Schanck Stud.

In the 2024 World's Best Racehorse Rankings Pride Of Jenni was ranked 35= on a rating of 120 along with Mr Brightside.

She was ridden in many of her wins by Irish expatriate Declan Bates.

== Notable races ==
Placing	Date	Race	Jockey	1st	2nd	3rd
1st	4/11/2023	G1 - Empire Rose Stakes	Declan Bates	Pride Of Jenni 57	Atishu 57	Life Lessons 57
1st	11/11/2023	G1 - Cantala Stakes	Declan Bates	Pride Of Jenni	Mr Brightside	Alligator Blood
1st	16/3/2024	All-Star Mile	Declan Bates	Pride Of Jenni	Mr Brightside	Cascadian
1st	13/4/2024	G1 - Queen Elizabeth Stakes	Declan Bates	Pride Of Jenni	Via Sistina	Mr Brightside
1st	27/9/2024	G2 - Feehan Stakes	Declan Bates	Pride Of Jenni 57	Mr Brightside 59	Antino 59
1st	15/3/2025	G2 - Peter Young Stakes	Craig Newitt	Pride Of Jenni 57	Zardozi 57	Bois D’argent 59
1st	26/9/2025	G2 - Feehan Stakes	Declan Bates	Pride Of Jenni 57	Treasurethe Moment 56.5	Attrition 59
1st	1/11/2025	G1 - Empire Rose Stakes	Declan Bates	Pride Of Jenni 57	Leica Lucy 57	On Display 57
3rd	7/3/2026	G1 - All-Star Mile	Declan Bates	Tom Kitten 59	Evaporate 59	Pride Of Jenni 57
2nd	28/3/2026	G1 - Australian Cup	Declan Bates	Light Infantry Man 59	Pride Of Jenni 57	Apulia 59
1st	9/5/2026	G2 - A D Hollindale Stakes	Declan Bates	Pride Of Jenni 57	Birdman 59	She's A Hustler 57
2nd	23/5/2026	G1 - Doomben Cup	Declan Bates	Birdman 59	Pride Of Jenni 57	Vauban 59
1st	27/09/2026	G2 - Feehan Stakes	Declan Bates	Pride Of Jenni 57	Treasurethe Moment 57	Pounding 59
