= A D Hollindale Stakes =

Horse race in Queensland, Australia

Coordinates: 28°00′19″S 153°24′28″E

A. D. Hollindale Stakes
- Class: Group 2
- Location: Gold Coast Racecourse; Surfers Paradise, Queensland, Australia
- Inaugurated: 1989 (as Southport Cup)
- Race type: Thoroughbred - Flat racing
- Sponsor: TAB (2019-26)

Race information
- Distance: 1,800 metres
- Surface: Turf
- Track: Right-handed
- Qualification: Horses three years old and older
- Weight: Weight for Age
- Purse: A$500,000 (2026)

The A. D. Hollindale Stakes is a Gold Coast Turf Club Group 2 Weight for Age Thoroughbred horse race for horses three years old and older, over a distance of 1,800 metres at Gold Coast Racecourse, Surfers Paradise, Queensland, Australia during the Queensland Winter Racing Carnival.

== History ==
The race is named in honour of Allan D. Hollindale, a cattle farmer, owner of the company Gold Coast Milk and former chairman of the Gold Coast Turf Club. The track also has a stand named after A.D. Hollindale.

=== Name ===
- 1989–1992 - Southport Cup
- 1993 onwards - A. D. Hollindale Stakes

=== Other venue ===
- 2023 - Sunshine Coast Racecourse

=== Grade ===
- 1990–1992 - Listed race
- 1993–1996 - Group 3 race
- 1997 onwards - Group 2

== Winners ==
The following are winners of the A D Hollindale Stakes.

- 2026 - Pride Of Jenni
- 2025 - Antino
- 2024 - Numerian
- 2023 - Zaaki
- 2022 - Zaaki
- 2021 - Zaaki
- 2020 - ‡race not held
- 2019 - Life Less Ordinary
- 2018 - Oregon's Day
- 2017 - It's Somewhat
- 2016 - Leebaz
- 2015 - Leebaz
- 2014 - Streama
- 2013 - Lights of Heaven
- 2012 - Shez Sinsational
- 2011 - My Kingdom Of Fife
- 2010 - Metal Bender
- 2009 - Fulmonti
- 2008 - Scenic Shot
- 2007 - Coalesce
- 2006 - Above Deck
- 2005 - Platinum Scissors
- 2004 - This Manshood
- 2003 - Bush Padre
- 2002 - Mr. Bureaucrat
- 2001 - Shogun Lodge
- 2000 - Shogun Lodge
- 1999 - Melora
- 1998 - Might and Power
- 1997 - Summer Beau
- 1996 - Super Slew
- 1995 - Danewin
- 1994 - Durbridge
- 1993 - Corndale
- 1992 - Rough Habit
- 1991 - Rough Habit
- 1990 - Hunter
- 1989 - Eye Of The Sky

‡ Not held because of the COVID-19 pandemic

== See also ==
- Gold Coast Guineas
- Ken Russell Memorial Classic
- List of Australian Group races
- Group races
