= Luke Currie =

Australian jockey

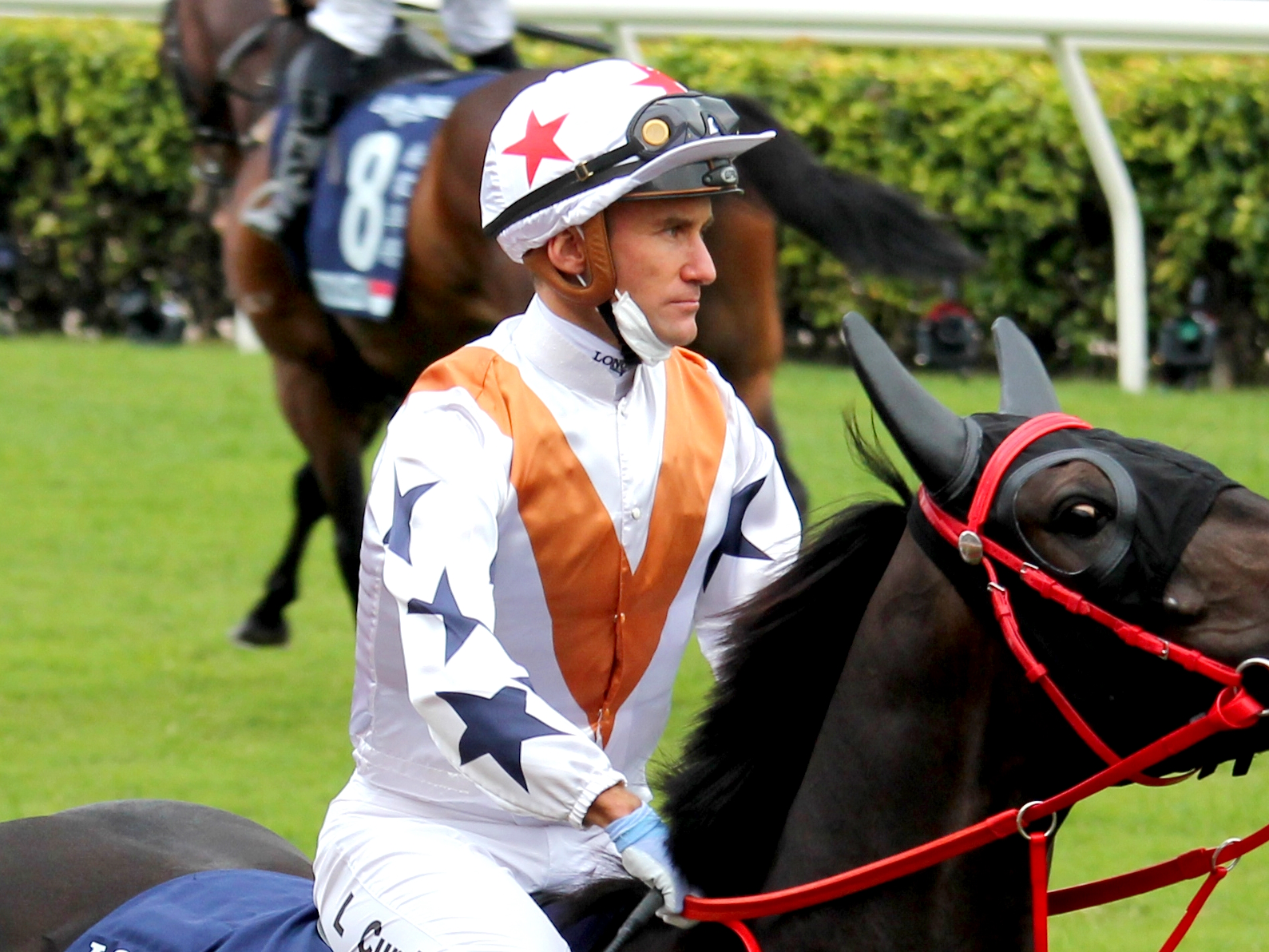
Luke Currie at the Hong Kong Sprint in 2023

Luke Richard Currie (born 24 July 1981) is an Australian jockey.

Currie has ridden in Singapore, Malaysia and Mauritius, and is now based in Hong Kong. His most prestigious victories are the 2003 Group 1 Toorak Handicap riding Roman Arch, 2002 VRC Queen Elizabeth Stakes, where he rode Makybe Diva, and the 2012 Group 2 Australia Stakes riding Sea Lord (Street Cry) for trainer Stephen Brown. As of late June 2021, he has ridden 1,358 winners, including 13 in Group One races.

== Major wins ==
Australia

- All-Star Mile – (1) – Mr Brightside (2023)
- Australian Guineas – (1) – Hey Doc (2017)
- Blue Diamond Stakes – (2) – Lyre (2019), Artorius (2021)
- Coolmore Stud Stakes – (1) – Sunlight (2018)
- Manikato Stakes – (2) – Hey Doc (2017,2020)
- Newmarket Handicap – (1) – Zoutori (2021)
- Orr Stakes – (2) – Suavito (2016), Manuel (2019)
- Toorak Handicap – (1) – Roman Arch (2003)
- VRC Champions Stakes – (1) – Arcadia Queen (2020)
- William Reid Stakes – (1) – Sunlight (2019)
- Winterbottom Stakes – (1) – Hey Doc (2019)
