= Whobegotyou =

Australian-bred Thoroughbred racehorse

- Sire: Street Cry (IRE)
- Grandsire: Machiavellian (USA)
- Dam: Temple of Peace (JPN)
- Damsire: Carnegie (IRE)
- Sex: Gelding
- Foaled: 19 August 2005
- Country: Australia
- Colour: Chestnut
- Breeder: Lockyer Thoroughbreds, ACT
- Owner: Laurence E Eales, Mrs P A Eales
- Trainer: Mark Kavanagh
- Record: 27: 9-10-3
- Earnings: $3,115,450

Major wins
- 2008 Caulfield Guineas; 2009 Yalumba Stakes; 2009, 2010 Dato Tan Chin Nam Stakes; 2011 Blamey Stakes; 2011 P B Lawrence Stakes

Awards
- Australian Champion Three Year Old (2008/2009)
- Last updated on 13 June 2011

Whobegotyou (19 August 2005 - 12 September 2012) was an Australian-bred Thoroughbred racehorse. The horse won nine races, including the Group One (G1) Caulfield Guineas and Yalumba Stakes for $3,115,450 in prize money.

He was a chestnut gelding that was foaled on 19 August 2005 and was bred by Lockyer Thoroughbreds. Whobegotyou was by the outstanding racehorse and sire, Street Cry (IRE), who won the Dubai World Cup and is the sire of winners of more than $51 million including, Shocking, Street Sense and Zenyatta. His dam, Temple of Peace was by Carnegie, who won the Prix de l'Arc de Triomphe and is the dam of winners of more than $50 million. She was imported into Australia in 2002 and is the dam of three named other horses, by different sires, which have not started in any black type races. Whobegotyou is inbred to Mr. Prospector in the third and fourth generation (3m x 4f) and twice to Riverman in the fourth generation (4m x 4f) of his pedigree.

Whobegotyou was passed in at the Inglis Classic yearling sale during February 2007 in Sydney and was later sold for $19,500 to Laurence E. Eales of Victoria. He possessed a good temperament, but was soon becoming heavy and starting to develop a crest. It was then decided to geld him before sending him to Mark Kavanagh, for training.

Whobegotyou died suddenly at a property near Sunbury in September 2012, aged seven.

== Racing career ==
Michael Rodd rode Whobegotyou in all of his wins except for two.

=== Two-year-old season: 2007-2008 ===
Whobegotyou won his first start, a maiden race at Geelong on 23 May 2008. He next started in and won a 1,200 metre two-year-old handicap, with Nicholas Ryan riding him, at Moonee Valley on 21 June 2008 before having a 10-week let-up.

=== Three-year-old season: 2008-2009 ===
This season Whobegotyou had 11 starts for wins in the G2 Bill Stutt Stakes contested over 1,600 metres; G1 Caulfield Guineas over 1,600 m and G2 AAMI Vase over 2,040 metres before finishing in Second place in the Victoria Derby over 2,500 metres when short odds on favourite. He was then spelled for 18 weeks before resuming racing in March with five more starts to finish the season for two seconds and then a third place in the Doncaster Handicap. At his next start he was unplaced in the G1 AJC Queen Elizabeth Stakes before being sent for a 16-week spell.

=== Four-year-old season: 2009-2010 ===
Whobegotyou had eight starts for wins in the G2 weight for age (w.f.a.) Feehan Stakes, also known as the Dato Tan Chin Nam Stakes when ridden by Damien Oliver and the G1 MRC Yalumba Stakes over 2,000. After starting as the $2.80 favourite in the Cox Plate he finished sixth and was found to be sore in his hindquarters and back before being spelled for 31 weeks. He resumed racing on 29 May 2010 with a start in the G1 Doomben 10,000 in which he finished second to the classy mare, Hot Danish. After an unplaced run in the G1 Stradbroke Handicap after being galloped on and injured he was given a let-up of 11 weeks.

=== Five-year-old season: 2010-2011 ===
At his first start in the new season Whobegotyou finished second, by a half length, to So You Think in the G2 Memsie Stakes over 1,400 metres. On 11 September 2010 he won his second Dato Tan Chin Nam Stakes defeating Typhoon Tracy by two lengths. Whobegotyou then placed third on 9 October 2010 in the Yalumba Stakes which So You Think won from Alcopop. He again placed third in the Cox Plate behind the winner, So You Think and Zipping who finished second.

=== Six-year-old season: 2011-2012 ===
Whobegotyou began his six-year-old campaign by winning the P B Lawrence Stakes by a neck from the Australasian Oaks winner Lights of Heaven. He then ran third in the G2 weight for age (w.f.a.) Feehan Stakes, also known as the Dato Tan Chin Nam Stakes at his 3rd attempt to in the race in 3 consecutive years. He had a total of 29 starts for 10 wins, 10 seconds and 4 thirds, with prize money of A$3,263,450.

== Race record ==
2007–08 season as a two-year-old
| Result | Date | Race | Venue | Group | Distance | Weight (kg) | Jockey | Winner/2nd |
|---|---|---|---|---|---|---|---|---|
| Won | 23 May 2008 | 2yo Maiden | Geelong | NA | 1100 m | 57 | M. Rodd | 2nd - Sherpa |
| Won | 21 Jun 2008 | 2yo Hcp Restricted | Moonee Valley | NA | 1200 m | 58 | N. Ryan | 2nd - Georgia's Boy |

2008–09 season as a three-year-old
| Result | Date | Race | Venue | Group | Distance | Weight (kg) | Jockey | Winner/2nd |
|---|---|---|---|---|---|---|---|---|
| 2nd | 30 Aug 2008 | McNeil Stakes | Caulfield | G3 | 1200 m | 55 | M. Rodd | 1st - Sugar Babe |
| 7th | 20 Sep 2008 | Guineas Prelude | Caulfield | G3 | 1400 m | 54 | M. Rodd | 1st - Fernandina |
| Won | 26 Sep 2008 | Bill Stutt Stakes | Moonee Valley | G2 | 1600 m | 55.5 | M. Rodd | 2nd - All American |
| Won | 11 Oct 2008 | Caulfield Guineas | Caulfield | G1 | 1600 m | 55.5 | M. Rodd | 2nd - Time Thief |
| Won | 25 Oct 2008 | AAMI Vase | Moonee Valley | G2 | 2040 m | 55.5 | M. Rodd | 2nd - Buffett |
| 2nd | 01 Nov 2008 | Victoria Derby | Flemington | G1 | 2500 m | 55.5 | M. Rodd | 1st - Rebel Raider |
| 2nd | 07 Mar 2009 | Food and Wine Stakes | Flemington | LR | 1400 m | 58.5 | D. Oliver | 1st - Rockpecker |
| 2nd | 21 Mar 2009 | Phar Lap Stakes | Rosehill | G2 | 1500 m | 56.5 | M. Rodd | 1st - Heart of Dreams |
| 9th | 04 Apr 2009 | George Ryder Stakes | Rosehill | G1 | 1500 m | 56.5 | M. Rodd | 1st - Vision and Power |
| 3rd | 18 Apr 2009 | Doncaster Handicap | Randwick | G1 | 1600 m | 54.5 | M. Rodd | 1st - Vision and Power |
| 9th | 25 Apr 2009 | Queen Elizabeth Stakes | Randwick | G1 | 2000 m | 55.5 | M. Rodd | 1st - Pompeii Ruler |

2009–10 season as a four-year-old
| Result | Date | Race | Venue | Group | Distance | Weight (kg) | Jockey | Winner/2nd |
|---|---|---|---|---|---|---|---|---|
| 2nd | 15 Aug 2009 | J J Liston Stakes | Caulfield | G2 | 1400 m | 58.5 | D. Oliver | 1st - Predatory Pricer |
| 2nd | 29 Aug 2009 | Memsie Stakes | Caulfield | G2 | 1400 m | 58.5 | S. King | 1st - Mic Mac |
| Won | 12 Sep 2009 | Feehan Stakes | Moonee Valley | G2 | 1600 m | 58.5 | D. Oliver | 2nd - Mic Mac |
| 2nd | 19 Sep 2009 | Underwood Stakes | Caulfield | G1 | 1800 m | 58 | M. Rodd | 1st - Heart of Dreams |
| Won | 10 Oct 2009 | Yalumba Stakes | Caulfield | G1 | 2000 m | 58 | D. Oliver | 2nd - Heart of Dreams |
| 6th | 24 Oct 2009 | Cox Plate | Moonee Valley | G1 | 2040 m | 57.5 | D. Oliver | 1st - So You Think |
| 2nd | 29 May 2010 | Doomben 10,000 | Doomben | G1 | 1350 m | 59 | M. Rodd | 1st - Hot Danish |
| 11th | 12 Jun 2010 | Stradbroke Handicap | Eagle Farm | G1 | 1400 m | 57 | M. Rodd | 1st - Black Piranha |

2010–11 season as a five-year-old
| Result | Date | Race | Venue | Group | Distance | Weight (kg) | Jockey | Winner/2nd |
|---|---|---|---|---|---|---|---|---|
| 2nd | 28 Aug 2010 | Memsie Stakes | Caulfield | G2 | 1400 m | 59 | M. Rodd | 1st - So You Think |
| Won | 11 Sep 2010 | Feehan Stakes | Moonee Valley | G2 | 1600 m | 59 | M. Rodd | 2nd - Typhoon Tracy |
| 3rd | 09 Oct 2010 | Caulfield Stakes | Caulfield | G1 | 2000 m | 59 | M. Rodd | 1st - So You Think |
| 3rd | 23 Oct 2010 | Cox Plate | Moonee Valley | G1 | 2040 m | 59 | M. Rodd | 1st - So You Think |
| 2nd | 26 Feb 2011 | Futurity Stakes | Caulfield | G1 | 1400 m | 59 | D. Oliver | 1st - More Joyous |
| Won | 12 Mar 2011 | Blamey Stakes | Flemington | G2 | 1600 m | 58 | D. Oliver | 2nd - Dao Dao |

2011–12 season as a six-year-old
| Result | Date | Race | Venue | Group | Distance | Weight (kg) | Jockey | Winner/2nd |
|---|---|---|---|---|---|---|---|---|
| Won | 13 Aug 2011 | P B Lawrence Stakes | Caulfield | G2 | 1400 m | 59 | D. Oliver | 2nd - Lights of Heaven |
| 3rd | 10 Sep 2011 | Feehan Stakes | Moonee Valley | G2 | 1600 m | 59 | D. Oliver | 1st - Rekindled Interest |

== Pedigree ==
Pedigree of Whobegotyou (Aus)
| Sire Street Cry (Ire) 1998 | Machiavellian (USA); 1987 | Mr. Prospector (USA); 1970 | Raise a Native (USA) |
| Sire Street Cry (Ire) 1998 | Machiavellian (USA); 1987 | Mr. Prospector (USA); 1970 | Gold Digger (USA) |
| Sire Street Cry (Ire) 1998 | Machiavellian (USA); 1987 | Coup De Folie (USA); 1982 | Halo (USA) |
| Sire Street Cry (Ire) 1998 | Machiavellian (USA); 1987 | Coup De Folie (USA); 1982 | Raise the Standard (Can) |
| Sire Street Cry (Ire) 1998 | Helen Street (GB); 1982 | Troy (GB); 1976 | Petingo (GB) |
| Sire Street Cry (Ire) 1998 | Helen Street (GB); 1982 | Troy (GB); 1976 | La Milo (GB) |
| Sire Street Cry (Ire) 1998 | Helen Street (GB); 1982 | Waterway (Ire); 1976 | Riverman (USA) |
| Sire Street Cry (Ire) 1998 | Helen Street (GB); 1982 | Waterway (Ire); 1976 | Boulevard (Ire) |
| Dam Temple of Peace (Jpn) 1998 | Carnegie (Ire); 1991 | Sadler's Wells (USA); 1981 | Northern Dancer (Can) |
| Dam Temple of Peace (Jpn) 1998 | Carnegie (Ire); 1991 | Sadler's Wells (USA); 1981 | Fairy Bridge (USA) |
| Dam Temple of Peace (Jpn) 1998 | Carnegie (Ire); 1991 | Detroit (Fr); 1977 | Riverman (USA) |
| Dam Temple of Peace (Jpn) 1998 | Carnegie (Ire); 1991 | Detroit (Fr); 1977 | Derna (Fr) |
| Dam Temple of Peace (Jpn) 1998 | Clovis Point (GB); 1991 | Kris (GB); 1976 | Sharpen Up (GB) |
| Dam Temple of Peace (Jpn) 1998 | Clovis Point (GB); 1991 | Kris (GB); 1976 | Doubly Sure (GB) |
| Dam Temple of Peace (Jpn) 1998 | Clovis Point (GB); 1991 | Graphite (USA); 1984 | Mr Prospector (USA) |
| Dam Temple of Peace (Jpn) 1998 | Clovis Point (GB); 1991 | Graphite (USA); 1984 | Stellarette (Can) (Family: 14-c) |
