= Paradise Stakes =

Flat horse race in Britain

- Class: Listed
- Location: Ascot Racecourse; Ascot, England
- Race type: Flat / Thoroughbred
- Website: Ascot

Race information
- Distance: 1 mile (1,609 metres)
- Surface: Turf
- Track: Straight
- Qualification: Four-years-old and up exc G1 winners since 31 August 2024
- Weight: 9 st 5 lb Allowances; 5 lb for fillies and mares Penalties; 7 lb for Group 2 winners * 5 lbs for Group 3 winners* 3 lb for Listed winners * * since 31 August last year
- Purse: £60,000 (2025); 1st: £34,026

bet365 Paradise Stakes
2026
Jonquil	Holloway Boy	Remmooz

Previous years
2025
Sardinian Warrior	Docklands	Checkandchallenge
2024
Quddwah	Docklands	Maljoom
2023
Chindit	Cash	Raadobarg
2022
New Mandate	Sir Busker	Intellogent
2021
Oh This Is Us	Prince Eiji	Sir Busker

2020-2011
2020
Marie's Diamond	Lord Tennyson	Vale Of Kent
2019
Zaaki	Barney Roy	Robin Of Navan
2018
Century Dream	Crazy Horse	Accidental Agent
2017
Tabarrak	Ennaadd	Firmament
2016
Gm Hopkins	Battle Of Marathon	Arod
2015
Moohaarib	Hors De Combat	Mondialiste
2014
Ocean Tempest	Graphic	French Navy
2013
Fencing	Sovereign Debt	Stipulate
2012
Sri Putra	Saamidd	Side Glance
2011
Side Glance	St Moritz	Critical Moment

2010-2001
2010
King Of Dixie	Cityscape	Nasri
2009
General Eliott	Perfect Stride	Laa Rayb
2008
Cesare	Don't Panic	Drumfire
2007
Cesare	Illustrious Blue	Dunelight
2006
Stronghold	Vortex	St Andrews
2005
Horeion Directa	Arakan	Millennium Force
2004
Putra Pekan	New Seeker	Ikhtyar
2003
Serieux	With Reason	Demonstrate
2002
Bourgainville	Smirk	Inglenook

2000-1995
2000
Sharmy	Cardiff Arms	Tillerman
1999
Duck Row	Right Wing	Sugarfoot
1997
Nwaamis	Charlotte Corday	Cap Juluca
1996
Tarawa	Behaviour	Green Green Desert
1995
Calling Collect	Airport	Risk Master

The Paradise Stakes is a Listed flat horse race in Great Britain open to horses aged four years or older. It is run at Ascot over a distance of 1 mile (1,609 metres), and it is scheduled to take place each year in April.

The race was first run, as the Chobham Conditions Stakes, in 1995. It was given its current name and awarded Listed status in 2004.

Since 2019 the official title has indicated that the race should be considered as a trial for the Queen Anne Stakes, run at the Royal Meeting over the same course and distance in June.

The race title was originally used for a different race, now called the Sagaro Stakes, which is run at the same Ascot meeting.

== Winners ==
Year	Winner	Age	Jockey	Trainer	Time
1995	Calling Collect	6	Pat Eddery	Luca Cumani	1:45.29
1996	Tarawa	4	Richard Hughes	Neville Callaghan	1:42.12
1997	Nwaamis	5	Richard Hills	John Dunlop	1:42.31
1998	Abandoned due to waterlogging
1999	Duck Row	4	Seb Sanders	James Toller	1:43.67
2000	Sharmy	4	Kieren Fallon	Sir Michael Stoute	1:47.65
2001	Abandoned due to waterlogging
2002	Bourgainville	4	Martin Dwyer	Ian Balding	1:45.41
2003	Serieux	4	Pat Eddery	Amanda Perrett	1:43.74
2004	Putra Pekan	6	Kieren Fallon	Michael Jarvis	1:48.30
2005	Horeion Directa	6	Andrasch Starke	Andreas Lowe	1:36.17
2006	Stronghold	4	Richard Hughes	John Gosden	1:28.80
2007	Cesare	6	Jamie Spencer	James Fanshawe	1:37.86
2008	Cesare	7	Jamie Spencer	James Fanshawe	1:46.36
2009	Perfect Stride (Note: General Eliott finished first in 2009 but was disqualified after a banned substance was found in his sample)	4	Ryan Moore	Sir Michael Stoute	1:42.53
2010	King Of Dixie	6	Jim Crowley	William Knight	1:40.23
2011	Side Glance	4	Jimmy Fortune	Andrew Balding	1:39.60
2012	Sri Putra	6	Neil Callan	Roger Varian	1:36.01
2013	Fencing	4	William Buick	John Gosden	1:39.70
2014	Ocean Tempest	5	Adam Kirby	John Ryan	1:44.90
2015	Moohaarib	4	Martin Harley	Marco Botti	1:39.26
2016	Gm Hopkins	5	Ryan Moore	John Gosden	1:41.96
2017	Tabarrak	4	Jim Crowley	Richard Hannon Jr.	1:39.44
2018	Century Dream	4	William Buick	Simon Crisford	1:45.25
2019	Zaaki	4	Frankie Dettori	Sir Michael Stoute	1:39.13
2020 (Note: The 2020 race was run at Newmarket in June, due to the COVID-19 pandemic in the United Kingdom)	Marie's Diamond	4	Silvestre de Sousa	Mark Johnston	1:34.47
2021	Oh This Is Us	8	Tom Marquand	Richard Hannon Jr.	1:40.60
2022	New Mandate	4	Frankie Dettori	Ralph Beckett	1:40.85
2023	Chindit	5	Pat Dobbs	Richard Hannon Jr.	1:42.44
2024	Quddwah	4	William Buick	Simon & Ed Crisford	1:42.30
2025	Sardinian Warrior	4	Kieran Shoemark	John & Thady Gosden	1:36.73
2026	Jonquil	4	Colin Keane	Andrew Balding	1:39.79

== See also ==
- Horse racing in Great Britain
- List of British flat horse races
