= Shocking (horse) =

Australian-bred Thoroughbred racehorse

- Sire: Street Cry (IRE)
- Grandsire: Machiavellian (USA)
- Dam: Maria Di Castiglia (GB)
- Damsire: Danehill (USA)
- Sex: Stallion
- Foaled: 23 September 2005
- Country: Australia
- Colour: Bay
- Breeder: George & Felicity Fraser, Ilala Stud
- Owner: Laurence Eales
- Trainer: Mark Kavanagh
- Record: 27: 7–6–2
- Earnings: $4,981,275

Major wins
- Melbourne Cup (2009); Lexus Stakes (2009); Makybe Diva Stakes (2010); Australian Cup (2011)

Awards
- Australian Champion Stayer (2009/2010)
- Last updated on 7 June 2011

Shocking (foaled 23 September 2005) is an Australian bred Thoroughbred racehorse, trained by Mark Kavanagh, who won the 149th Melbourne Cup on 3 November 2009 by three-quarters of a length.

== Pedigree ==
Shocking is by the outstanding sire, Street Cry (Ireland) out of Maria Di Castaglia by Danehill (USA). George Fraser purchased Maria di Castiglia (GB) while she was carrying Shocking in utero at a William Inglis bloodstock sale for $20,000. Fraser later sold the resulting foal, Shocking, at the 2007 Magic Millions Yearling Sale for $45,000 to a local horse broker. After being broken in, he was sold on to Laurence Eales for $64,000 in late 2007. Laurence Eales also owns the 2009 Caulfield Stakes winner Whobegotyou, also by Street Cry.

== Racing record ==
At the time of winning the Melbourne Cup he was four years old and had qualified after winning the Lexus Stakes over 2,500 metres at Flemington on 31 October 2009. The Melbourne Cup was Shocking's 15th start. He defeated Crime Scene (ridden by Kerrin McEvoy) and Mourilyan (ridden by Glyn Schofield) who placed second and third respectively. It was the first Melbourne Cup win for jockey Corey Brown, who placed second in the 2008 race in a photo finish, second in the 2002 race and dead-heated for third whilst riding Lahar in the 1999 Melbourne Cup.

Shocking's 2010 autumn campaign was curtailed by an injury after two unplaced starts. Returning in the spring of 2010, he won second-up in the Group Two Makybe Diva Stakes over 1,600 metres, putting him into Melbourne Cup favouritism. He followed up with a luckless fourth in the Caulfield Cup and a 6th in the LKS MacKinnon Stakes. He was the second favourite for the Melbourne Cup on 2 November, behind dual Cox Plate and Mackinnon Stakes winner So You Think. In the autumn of 2011, Shocking again showed his liking for Flemington when winning the Australian Cup over 2,000 metres.

The Australian Cup win ended up being Shocking's final career start.

== Stud career ==
Shocking stands at Rich Hill Stud in New Zealand. His stud fee was $12,500 + GST in 2024.

=== Notable progeny ===
Shocking has sired 5 Group One winners:

c = colt, f = filly, g = gelding

Foaled	Name	Sex	Dam	Dam sire	Major wins
2012	Fanatic	f	Komplete Klass (NZ)	Groom Dancer (USA)	2016 New Zealand Oaks
2014	Defibrillate	g	Our Chickaroonie (NZ)	Groom Dancer (USA)	2022 Zabeel Classic
2017	Here To Shock	g	Frescoes (AUS)	Lonhro (AUS)	2025 BCD Group Sprint
2017	I'm Thunderstruck	g	Primadonna Girl (NZ)	Edenwold (Can)	2021 Toorak Handicap; 2022 Makybe Diva Stakes
2018	El Vencedor	g	Strictly Maternal (NZ)	O'Reilly (NZ)	2024 & 2025 Bonecrusher Stakes; 2025 Herbie Dyke Stakes; 2025 Otaki-Maori Weight for Age
