= James McDonald (jockey) =

New Zealand jockey

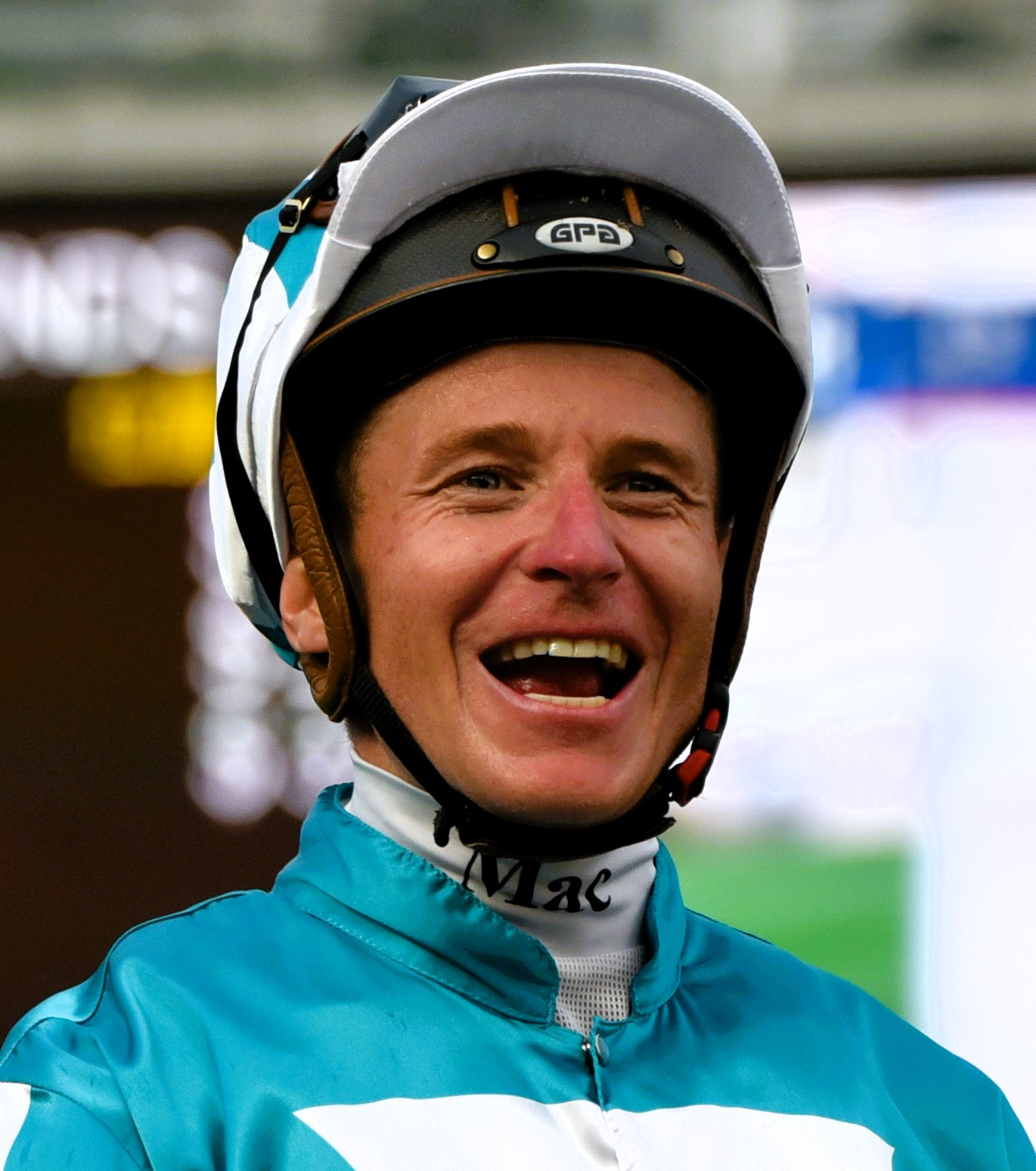
- McDonald winning the Hong Kong Cup at the Sha Tin Racecourse in 2023

Personal information
- Nicknames: JMac, J-Mac
- Born: 6 January 1992 (age 34) Kaipaki, New Zealand
- Occupation: Jockey
- Weight: 55 kg (121 lb)

Horse racing career
- Sport: Horse racing

Honours
- New Zealand Racing Hall of Fame (2021); World Jockey of the Year (2022, 2024, 2025)

Significant horses
- Verry Elleegant, It's A Dundeel, Nature Strip, Anamoe, Romantic Warrior, Via Sistina, Voyage Bubble, Autumn Glow

James McDonald (born 6 January 1992) is a New Zealand thoroughbred racing jockey and member of the New Zealand Racing Hall of Fame. On 2 November 2021, McDonald rode the winning horse Verry Elleegant in the 2021 Melbourne Cup. He has been awarded the World Jockey of the Year in 2021 and 2024 in the TRC Global Rankings.

== Group 1 winners (147) ==
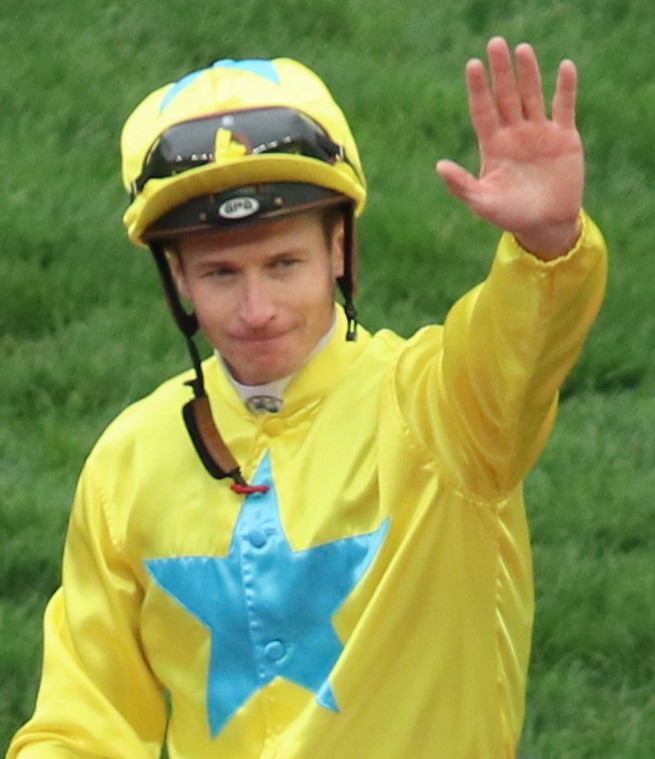
McDonald winning the Queen's Silver Jubilee Cup at the Sha Tin Racecourse in 2023

McDonald has currently ridden 147 Group One winners, including 115 in Australia, 18 in Hong Kong, 11 in New Zealand and one each in Japan, United Kingdom and UAE:

== Major wins ==
Australia

- AJC Derby (2) - It's A Dundeel (2013); Riff Rocket (2024)
- All Aged Stakes (1) - Cascadian (2022)
- Australasian Oaks (1) - Panova (2026)
- Australian Oaks (3) - Rising Romance (2014); Verry Elleegant (2019); Ohope Wins (2026)
- Canterbury Stakes (3) - Cosmic Endeavour (2015); Holler (2016); Joliestar (2026)
- Caulfield Guineas (3) - Shooting To Win (2014); The Autumn Sun (2018); Golden Mile (2022)
- Caulfield Stakes (1) - Anamoe (2022)
- Champagne Stakes (2) - Captivant (2021); Broadsiding (2024)
- Champions Mile (1) - Autumn Glow (2026)
- Champions Stakes (4) - Zaaki (2021); Atishu (2023); Via Sistina (2024); Via Sistina (2025)
- Chipping Norton Stakes (6) - Contributer (2015); Verry Elleegant (2021); Verry Elleegant (2022); Anamoe (2023); Via Sistina (2025); Autumn Glow (2026)
- Coolmore Classic (3) - Zougotcha (2024); Lady Shenandoah (2025); Lazzura (2026)
- Coolmore Stud Stakes (3) - Home Affairs (2021); In Secret (2022); Switzerland (2024)
- Cox Plate (4) - Anamoe (2022); Romantic Warrior (2023); Via Sistina (2024); Via Sistina (2025)
- Darley Champions Sprint (4) - Delectation (2015); Nature Strip (2019); Nature Strip (2021); Sunshine In Paris (2024)
- Doomben Cup (2) - Zaaki (2021); Birdman (2026)
- Doomben 10,000 (1) - Sunshine in Paris (2025)
- Empire Rose Stakes (3) - Shillelagh (2018); Atishu (2024); Lady Shenandoah (2026)
- Epsom Handicap (1) - Hauraki (2016)
- Flight Stakes (2) - Funstar (2019); Zougotcha (2022)
- George Ryder Stakes (3) - Real Impact (2015); Anamoe (2023); Autumn Glow (2026)
- Golden Rose Stakes (3) - Exosphere (2015); Astern (2016); Broadsiding (2024)
- Golden Slipper Stakes (1) - Mossfun (2014)
- J. J. Atkins (2) - Broadsiding (2024); Tron Bolt (2026)
- King Charles III Stakes (4) - Verry Elleegant (2021); Anamoe (2022); Fangirl (2023); Autumn Glow (2026)
- Kingsford-Smith Cup (1) - Joliestar (2025)
- Lightning Stakes (1) - Home Affairs (2022)
- Melbourne Cup (1) - Verry Elleegant (2021)
- Moir Stakes (1) - Nature Strip (2019)
- Queen Elizabeth Stakes (2) - It's A Dundeel (2014); Via Sistina (2025)
- Queen of the Turf Stakes (2) - Zougotcha (2024); Fangirl (2025)
- Queensland Derby (3) - Kukeracha (2021); Kovalica (2023); Providence (2026)
- Queensland Oaks (1) - Scarlett Lady (2011)
- Randwick Guineas (1) - It's A Dundeel (2013)
- Ranvet Stakes (5) - Contributer (2015); Verry Elleegant (2021); Via Sistina (2024); Via Sistina (2025); Aeliana (2026)
- Rosehill Guineas (4) - It's A Dundeel (2013); Anamoe (2022); Broadsiding (2025); Autumn Boy (2026)
- Sires' Produce Stakes (2) - Anamoe (2021); Campione D'Italia (2026)
- Spring Champion Stakes (1) - It's A Dundeel (2012)
- Surround Stakes (1) - Lady Shenandoah (2025)
- Tancred Stakes (4) - Hartnell (2015); Avilius (2019); Verry Elleegant (2020); Aeliana (2026)
- The Galaxy (2) - Temple Of Boom (2012); Nature Strip (2019)
- The Metropolitan (1) - Magic Hurricane (2015)
- The Thousand Guineas (2) - Madame Pommery (2022); Joliestar (2023)
- TJ Smith Stakes (4) - Nature Strip (2020); Nature Strip (2021); Nature Strip (2022); Joliestar (2026)
- Toorak Handicap (1) - Lady Shenandoah (2026)
- Turnbull Stakes (1) - Hartnell (2016)
- Underwood Stakes (1) - It's A Dundeel (2014)
- Victoria Derby (2) - Riff Rocket (2023); Stormy Marco (2026)
- Vinery Stud Stakes (2) - Verry Elleegant (2019); Orchestral (2024)
- VRC Oaks (1) - Zardozi (2023)
- Winx Stakes (5) - Verry Elleegant (2020); Anamoe (2022); Fangirl (2023); Via Sistina (2025); Autumn Glow (2026)

New Zealand

- Auckland Cup (1) - Shez Sinsational (2012)
- Haunui Farm WFA Classic (1) - Keep The Peace (2011)
- Mudgway Stakes (1) - Keep The Peace (2010)
- New Zealand Derby (1) - Silent Achiever (2012)
- New Zealand International Stakes (1) - Shez Sinsational (2012)
- New Zealand Oaks (1) - Jungle Rocket (2009)
- New Zealand Stakes (1) - Scarlett Lady (2012)
- New Zealand Thoroughbred Breeders Stakes (1) - Special Mission (2008)
- Telegraph Handicap (1) - Guiseppina (2012)
- Zabeel Classic (2) - Shez Sinsational (2011); True Enough (2019)

United Kingdom

- King's Stand Stakes - (1) - Nature Strip (2022)

Hong Kong

- Champions Mile - (1) - Xtension (2012)
- Hong Kong Champions & Chater Cup - (2) - Voyage Bubble (2025); Romantic Warrior (2026)
- Hong Kong Cup - (4) - Romantic Warrior (2022, 2023, 2024, 2025)
- Hong Kong Stewards' Cup - (3) - Voyage Bubble (2024, 2025) Romantic Warrior (2026)
- Queen Elizabeth II Cup - (3) - Romantic Warrior (2023, 2024, 2026)
- Queen's Silver Jubilee Cup - (1) - Lucky Sweynesse (2023)
- Hong Kong Gold Cup - (3) - Romantic Warrior (2024, 2026); Voyage Bubble (2025)
- Hong Kong Mile - (1) - Voyage Bubble (2024)

Japan

- Yasuda Kinen - (1) Romantic Warrior (2024)

United Arab Emirates

- Jebel Hatta - (1) Romantic Warrior (2025)
