= John F. Feehan Stakes =

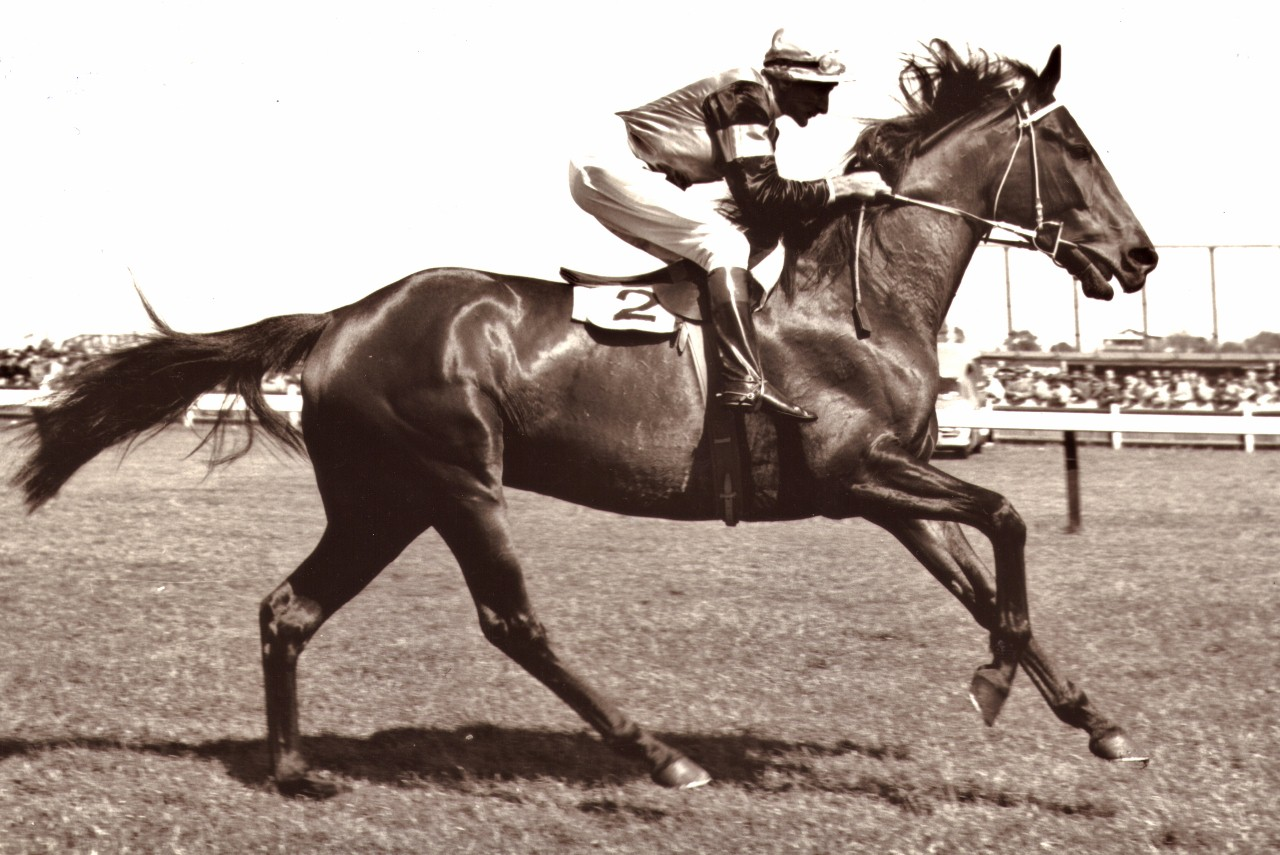
- Rising Fast, 1954 winner
- Class: Group 2
- Location: Moonee Valley Racecourse, Melbourne
- Inaugurated: 1948
- Race type: Thoroughbred
- Sponsor: Ladbrokes (2024-26)

Race information
- Distance: 1,600 metres
- Surface: Turf
- Track: Left-handed
- Weight: Weight for Age
- Purse: $500,000 (2025)
- Bonuses: Exempt from ballot in the W. S. Cox Plate and Caulfield Cup

The John F. Feehan Stakes is a Moonee Valley Racing Club Group 2 Australian Thoroughbred horse race held under Weight for Age conditions, for horses aged three years old and upwards, over a distance of 1600 meters at Moonee Valley Racecourse in September.

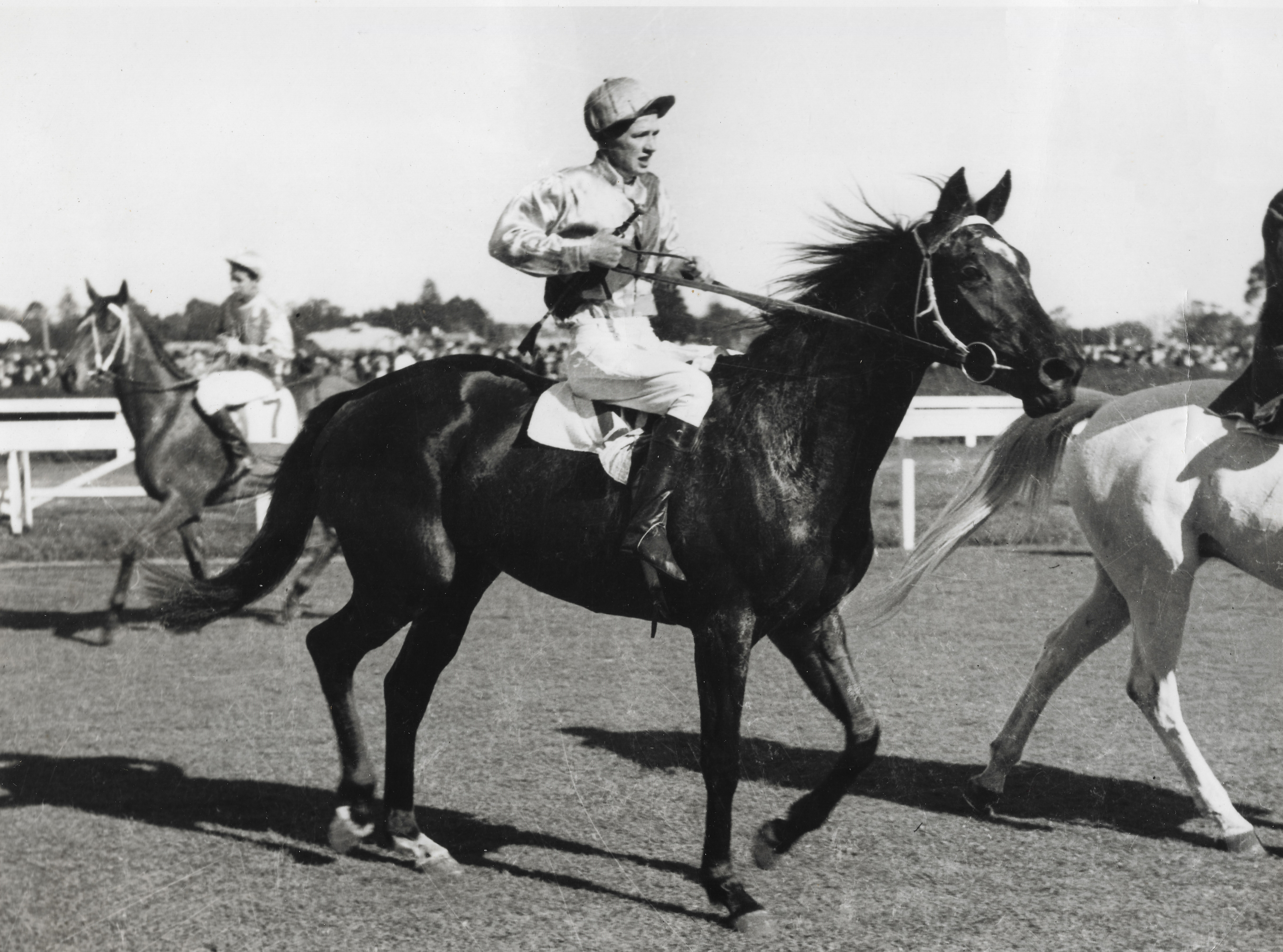
Chicquita, 1950 winner

== History ==
The original race was named after John F. Feehan, who was the landowner of where the Moonee Valley Racecourse is located now. The race was named between 2005 and 2018 as the Dato' Tan Chin Nam Stakes after the Malaysian entrepreneur and racehorse owner Dato' Tan Chin Nam.

=== 1950 racebook ===
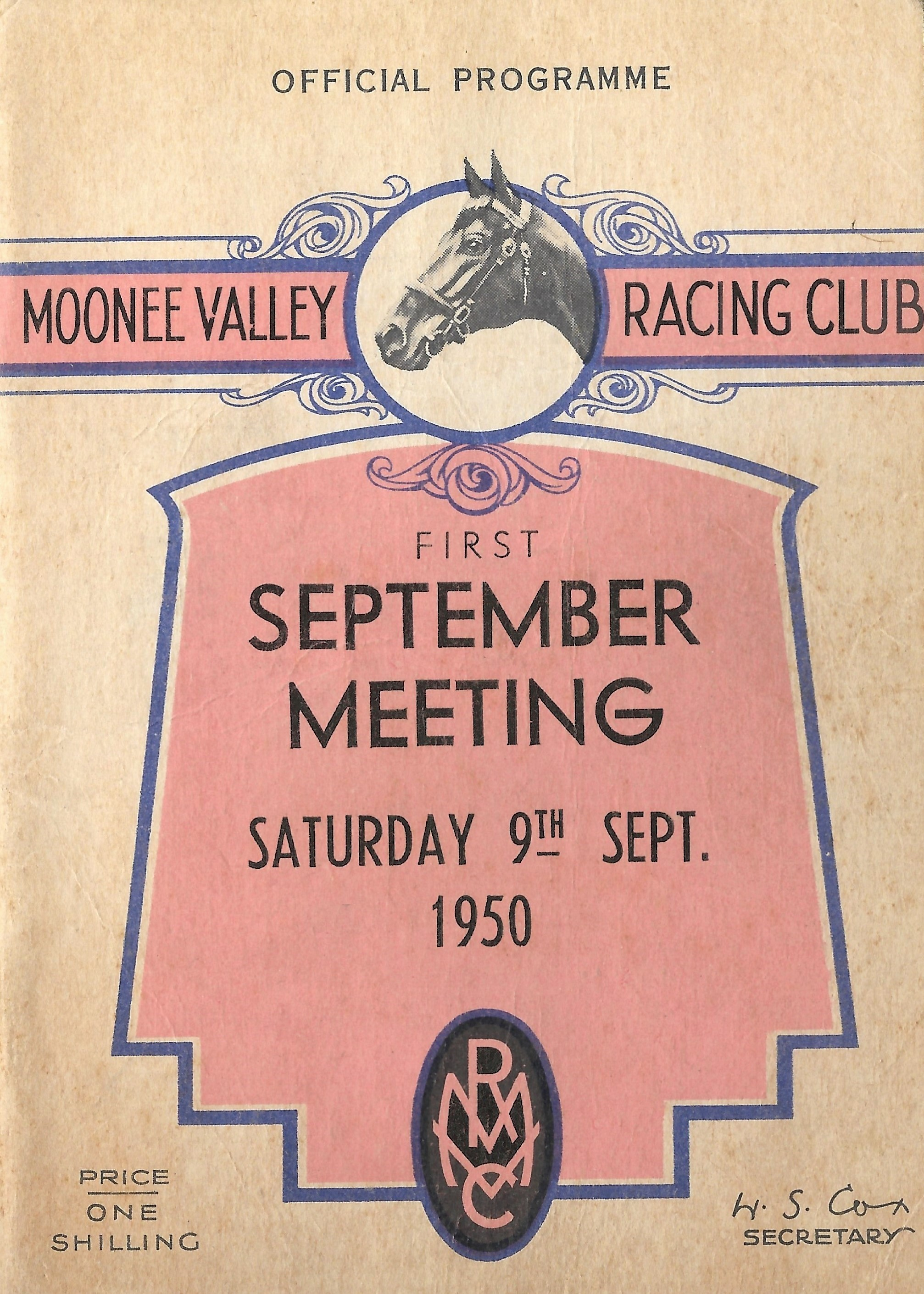
1950 MVRC John F. Feehan Stakes racebook front cover

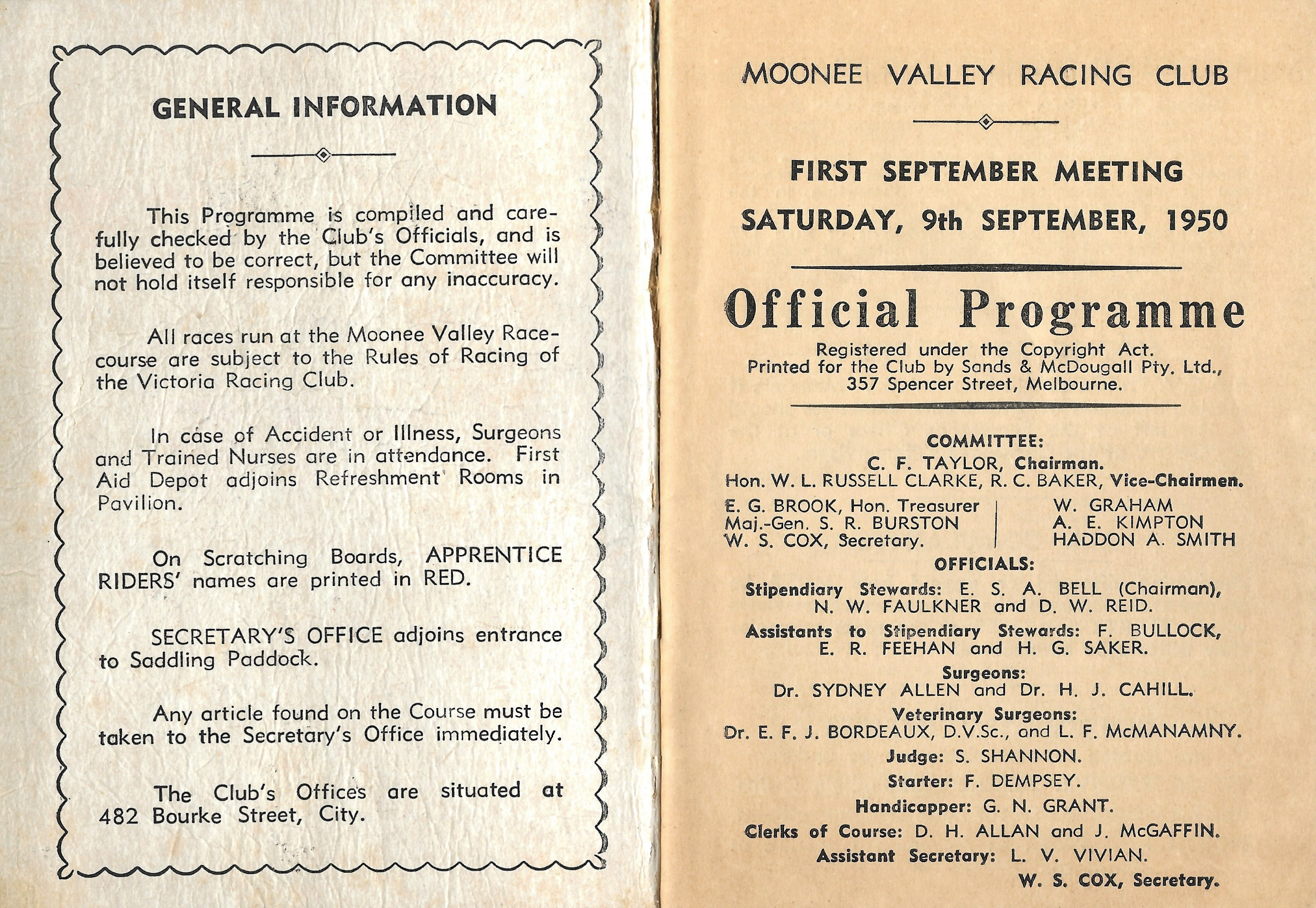
1950 MVRC John F. Feehan Stakes raceday officials

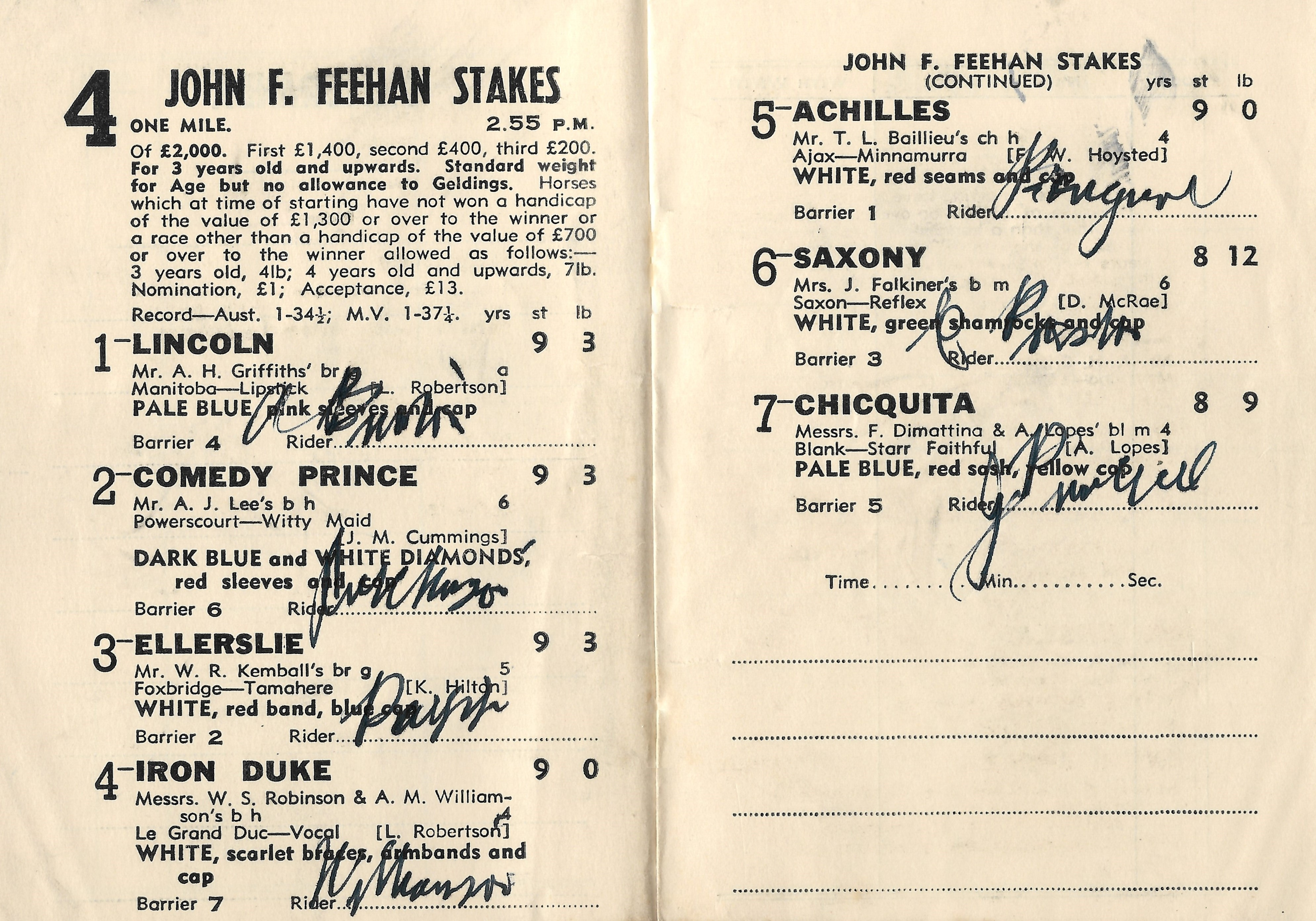
1950 MVRC John F. Feehan Stakes showing the winner, Chicquita

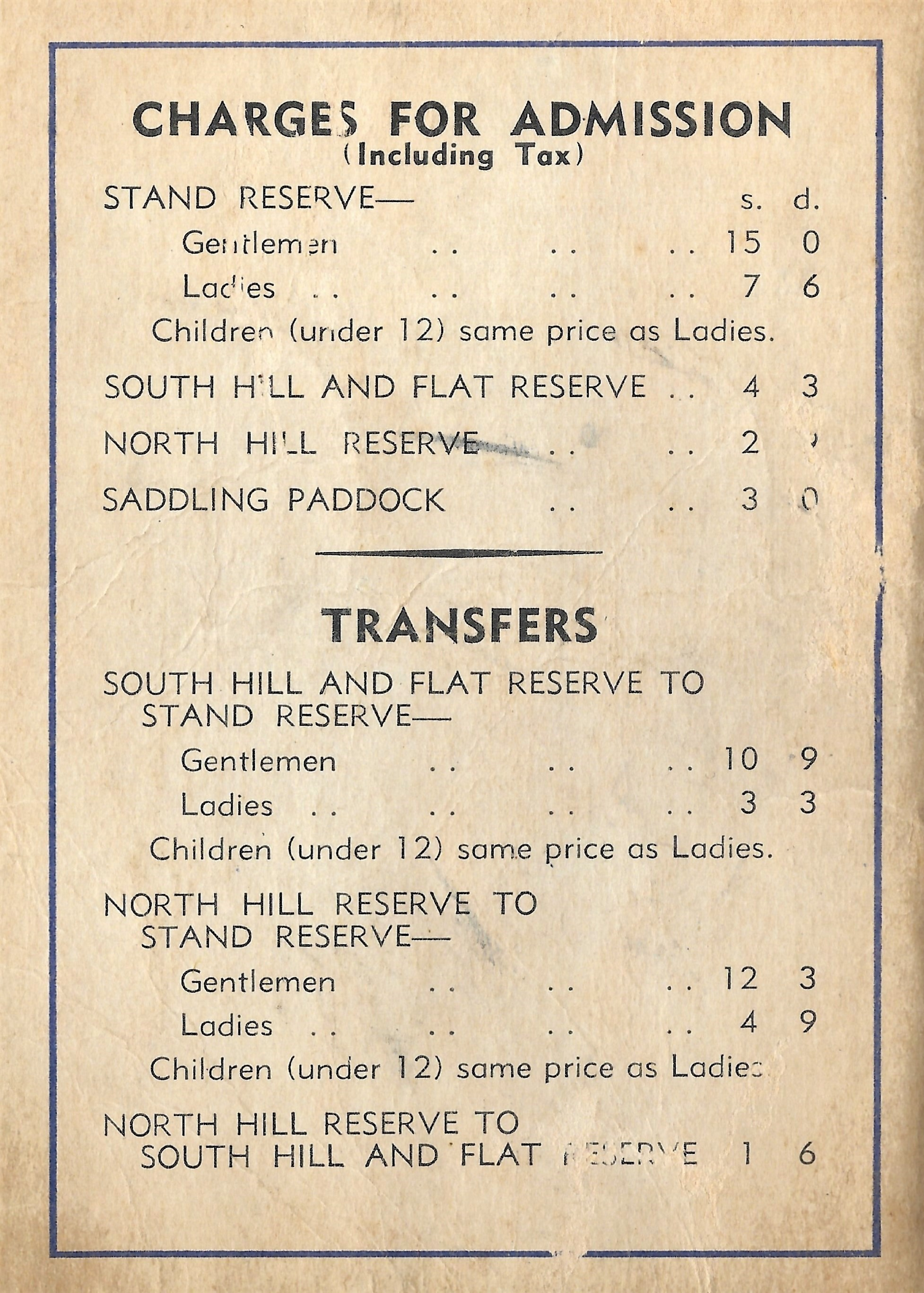
Back cover showing admission charges and transfers

=== Name ===
- 1948 – Glenroy Stakes
- 1949–1955 – J.F. Feehan Stakes
- 1956–1969 – J.F. Feehan Handicap
- 1970–1982 – J.F. Feehan Stakes
- 1983 – Centennial Stakes
- 1984–2004 – J.F. Feehan Stakes
- 2005–2018 – Dato' Tan Chin Nam Stakes
- 2019 – J.F. Feehan Stakes

=== Distance ===
- 1948–1971 – 1 mile (~ 1600m)
- 1972–1986 – 1600 metres
- 1987 – 1619 metres
- 1988 onwards – 1600 metres

=== Grade ===
- 1948–1978 – Principal Race
- 1979 onwards – Group 2

=== Venue ===
- 1995, 2026 – held at Caulfield Racecourse

== Winners ==
The following are past winners of the race.

- 2026 - Pride Of Jenni
- 2025 - Pride Of Jenni
- 2024 - Pride Of Jenni
- 2023 - Pinstriped
- 2022 – Mr Brightside
- 2021 – Superstorm
- 2020 – Humidor
- 2019 – Homesman
- 2018 – Magic Consol
- 2017 – Bonneval
- 2016 – Awesome Rock
- 2015 – The Cleaner
- 2014 – The Cleaner
- 2013 – Fiorente
- 2012 – Happy Trails
- 2011 – Rekindled Interest
- 2010 – Whobegotyou
- 2009 – Whobegotyou
- 2008 – Guillotine
- 2007 – El Segundo
- 2006 – Lad of the Manor
- 2005 – Lad of the Manor
- 2004 – Delzao
- 2003 – Natural Blitz
- 2002 – Fields of Omagh
- 2001 – Northerly
- 2000 – Sunline
- 1999 – Inaflury
- 1998 – Aerosmith
- 1997 – Arctic Scent
- 1996 – Toil
- 1995 – Beaux Art
- 1994 – Tristalove
- 1993 – Palace Reign
- 1992 – Naturalism
- 1991 – Mannerism
- 1990 – Better Loosen Up
- 1989 – Our Westminster
- 1988 – Our Poetic Prince
- 1987 – Rubiton
- 1986 – Dazzling Duke
- 1985 – King Delamere
- 1984 – Penny Edition
- 1983 – Strawberry Road
- 1982 – Lawman
- 1981 – Lawman
- 1980 – Arbogast
- 1979 – Gondolier
- 1978 – So Called
- 1977 – Vice Regal
- 1976 – Wave King
- 1975 – Tontonan
- 1974 – Arama
- 1973 – Audaciter
- 1972 – Grand Scale
- 1971 – Upstairs
- 1970 – Shorengro
- 1969 – Shorengro
- 1968 – Shorengro
- 1967 – Bellition
- 1966 – †race not held
- 1965 – Winfreux
- 1964 – Heroic Stone
- 1963 – Sometime
- 1962 – Royal Belltor
- 1961 – Mardene
- 1960 – †race not held
- 1959 – Malarno
- 1958 – Summalu
- 1957 – On Parade
- 1956 – Arlunya
- 1955 – Townsville
- 1954 – Rising Fast
- 1953 – Quite Talk
- 1952 – Zezette
- 1951 – Iron Duke
- 1950 – Chicquita
- 1949 – Ellerslie
- 1948 – Phoibos

† 1960 & 1966 Race meeting cancelled because of rain

== See also ==
- JRA Cup
- Manikato Stakes
- Scarborough Stakes
- W H Stocks Stakes
- Bill Stutt Stakes
- List of Australian Group races
- Group races
