= Roman Arch =

Australian-bred Thoroughbred racehorse

- Sire: Archway (IRE)
- Grandsire: Thatching (USA)
- Dam: Celestial Option (AUS)
- Damsire: Clear Choice (USA)
- Sex: Gelding
- Foaled: 1998
- Country: Australia
- Colour: Bay
- Breeder: J Playfoot
- Owner: P Shulman, C O Bamford, K L Bamford, EST J A Fraser, D G Clough, L M Mckenna, P S Zeccola, Madds 5, S Nicholls R R Aujard
- Trainer: Robbie Laing; Mick Whittle
- Record: 94: 17-3-9
- Earnings: A$2,114,230

Major wins
- Toorak Handicap (2003); Sandown Classic (2005); Australian Cup (2006)
- Last updated on 16 October 2017

Roman Arch was an Australian bred racehorse that was foaled in 1998. (Another Roman Arch was foaled in 1995 in New Zealand.)

Roman Arch was most famous for winning the 2006 Australian Cup at the odds of 60/1 with the TAB. His other group 1 win was the 2003 Toorak Handicap ridden by Luke Currie where he beat subsequent Cox Plate winner, Fields of Omagh. Roman Arch also won the 2005 Werribee Cup and 2005 Sandown Classic.
