= Street Cry =

Irish-bred Thoroughbred racehorse

- Street Cry's grave at Jonabell Farm
- Sire: Machiavellian
- Grandsire: Mr Prospector
- Dam: Helen Street (GB)
- Damsire: Troy
- Sex: Stallion
- Foaled: 11 March 1998
- Died: 17 September 2014 (aged 16)
- Country: Ireland
- Colour: Bay or brown
- Breeder: Sheikh Mohammed bin Rashid Al Maktoum
- Owner: Godolphin Racing
- Trainer: Saeed bin Suroor
- Record: 12: 5–6–1
- Earnings: $5,150,837

Major wins
- UAE 2000 Guineas (2001); Al Maktoum Challenge, Round 3 (2002); Dubai World Cup (2002); Stephen Foster Handicap (2002)

Awards
- Australian Champion Sire (2015)

Street Cry (11 March 1998 – 17 September 2014) was a Thoroughbred racehorse, winner of the 2002 Dubai World Cup, the 2002 Stephen Foster Handicap and runner up in the 2002 Whitney Handicap. He was an international shuttle stallion that stood at the Darley Studs in Australia and the United States.

He is noteworthy for being the sire of Hall of Fame horse Winx, who was retired from racing in April 2019 with a world record of 25 Group One (G1) wins and also won the last 33 races of her career, the longest winning streak for a top-level racehorse in over a century. At her retirement, she was rated by Longines as the best racehorse in the world. He is also the sire of US racing sensation Zenyatta.

Owned and bred by Sheikh Mohammed's Godolphin Racing, he was by the dual G1 winner Machiavellian, a son of Mr Prospector. His dam, Helen Street (dam of nine winners) won the 1985 Irish Oaks and was by multiple Group One winner Troy.

== Racing record ==
=== Two-year-old ===
After winning his maiden race, Street Cry placed second in the Del Mar Futurity (G2) and Norfolk Stakes (United States) (G2), before running third in the Breeders' Cup Juvenile (G1).

=== Three-year-old ===
Street Cry won the UAE 2000 Guineas, then placed second in both the UAE Derby (G3) and Discovery Handicap (G3), at Aqueduct.

=== Four-year-old ===
Won Dubai World Cup (G1), won Stephen Foster H (G1), and was second in the Whitney Handicap (G1).

== Stud record ==
In America, Street Cry stood at Darley's Jonabell Farm in Lexington, Kentucky, for $150,000. After a two-year break, Street Cry returned in 2009 for a fifth season at Darley Stud, Kelvinside, in the Hunter Valley where he stood at a fee of A$110,000. During those five seasons in Australia, he covered 425 mares to produce 319 foals.

Darley's Chief Operating Officer, Oliver Tait, says that Street Cry produced "easy horses to train" that are "tough, willing, and genuine." Physically, his offspring have succeeded on "all distances and all surfaces" and "show incredible acceleration" so that they are "incredibly effective in the last quarter-mile of the race."

He was euthanized in Australia on September 17, 2014, as a result of complications of a neurological condition.

At the time of his death, he had sired seven grade I winners in the Northern Hemisphere, including 2010 Horse of the Year Zenyatta; Street Sense, who won the 2007 Kentucky Derby; and grade I-winning sprinter Street Boss, who won the Grade I Triple Bend Invitational Handicap and Bing Crosby Handicap.

His most notable progeny is Winx, rated as the best racehorse in the world and the winner of an unprecedented four Cox Plates. Winx was the 2015-16-17-18 Australian Horse of the Year and was retired from racing in April 2019 having won the last 33 races of her career plus a world record 25 Group 1s. Among her best wins are the Cox Plate (four times) and Doncaster Mile.

Other notable progeny include Group I winner Majestic Roi, winner of the Sun Chariot Stakes (G1) in England; Caulfield Guineas winners in Long John in 2013 and Whobegotyou; Shocking, winner of the 2009 Melbourne Cup; and Street Hero, winner of Norfolk Stakes, Tomcito who raced as a two-year-old in Peru winning two important G1 races against older horses.

In the Southern Hemisphere, his progeny included 107 yearlings sold for an average of $50,000 and a top price of $400,000. During 2009: 28 yearlings were sold; averaging $63,000 with a top price of $400,000. In the Northern Hemisphere: 164 yearlings sold for an average $165,000; top price $950,000. In 2008: 35 sold; average $174,000; top price $484,000.

=== Notable progeny ===
c = colt, f = filly, g = gelding

Foaled	Name	Sex	Major Wins
2004	Majestic Roi	f	Sun Chariot Stakes
2004	Street Boss	c	Triple Bend Stakes, Bing Crosby Stakes
2004	Street Sense	c	Breeders' Cup Juvenile, Kentucky Derby, Travers Stakes
2004	Zenyatta	f	Apple Blossom Handicap (twice), Vanity Handicap (3 times), Lady's Secret Stakes (3 times), Breeders' Cup Ladies Classic, Clement L. Hirsch Stakes (twice), Breeders' Cup Classic, Santa Margarita Stakes
2005	Cry and Catch Me	f	Oak Leaf Stakes
2005	Seventh Street	f	Apple Blossom Handicap, Go For Wand Handicap
2005	Shocking	c	Melbourne Cup, Australian Cup
2005	Victor's Cry	c	Shoemaker Mile Stakes
2005	Whobegotyou	g	Caulfield Guineas, Caulfield Stakes
2006	Here Comes Ben	c	Forego Stakes
2006	Street Hero	c	Norfolk Stakes
2009	Lyric of Light	f	Fillies' Mile
2010	Long John	g	Caulfield Guineas
2011	Heavens Above	f	Coolmore Classic
2011	New Year's Day	c	Breeders' Cup Juvenile
2011	Winx	f	Queensland Oaks, Epsom Handicap, W. S. Cox Plate (4 times), Chipping Norton Stakes (4 times), George Ryder Stakes (4 times), Doncaster Handicap, George Main Stakes (3 times), Caulfield Stakes, Queen Elizabeth Stakes (3 times), Turnbull Stakes (twice), Winx Stakes
2012	Pride of Dubai	c	Blue Diamond Stakes, Sires' Produce Stakes
2012	Stay With Me	f	The Thousand Guineas
2013	Delta Prince	c	Maker's Mark Mile Stakes
2013	Zulu Alpha	g	Pegasus World Cup Turf Invitational
2014	Oh Susanna	f	Paddock Stakes (twice), Sun Met, Woolavington 2000
2014	Trekking	g	Stradbroke Handicap, The Goodwood

Street Cry is also:

- Damsire of multiple Group 1 winner Romantic Warrior (Acclamation - Folk Melody).
- Damsire of multiple Group 1 winner Rebel's Romance (Dubawi - Minidress)
- Grand Sire of Pride Of Jenni (Pride Of Dubai - Sancerre)

== Pedigree ==
Pedigree of Street Cry (IRE), 1998
Sire Machiavellian (USA) b. 1987	Mr. Prospector (USA) b. 1970	Raise a Native	Native Dancer
Sire Machiavellian (USA) b. 1987	Mr. Prospector (USA) b. 1970	Raise a Native	Raise You
Sire Machiavellian (USA) b. 1987	Mr. Prospector (USA) b. 1970	Gold Digger	Nashua
Sire Machiavellian (USA) b. 1987	Mr. Prospector (USA) b. 1970	Gold Digger	Sequence
Sire Machiavellian (USA) b. 1987	Coup De Folie (USA) b. 1982	Halo	Hail to Reason
Sire Machiavellian (USA) b. 1987	Coup De Folie (USA) b. 1982	Halo	Cosmah
Sire Machiavellian (USA) b. 1987	Coup De Folie (USA) b. 1982	Raise the Standard	Hoist the Flag
Sire Machiavellian (USA) b. 1987	Coup De Folie (USA) b. 1982	Raise the Standard	Natalma
Dam Helen Street (GB) b. 1982	Troy (GB) b. 1976	Petingo	Petition
Dam Helen Street (GB) b. 1982	Troy (GB) b. 1976	Petingo	Alcazar
Dam Helen Street (GB) b. 1982	Troy (GB) b. 1976	La Milo	Hornbeam
Dam Helen Street (GB) b. 1982	Troy (GB) b. 1976	La Milo	Pin Prick
Dam Helen Street (GB) b. 1982	Waterway (FR) b. 1976	Riverman	Never Bend
Dam Helen Street (GB) b. 1982	Waterway (FR) b. 1976	Riverman	River Lady
Dam Helen Street (GB) b. 1982	Waterway (FR) b. 1976	Boulevard	Pall Mall
Dam Helen Street (GB) b. 1982	Waterway (FR) b. 1976	Boulevard	Costa Sola
