= Makybe Diva Stakes =

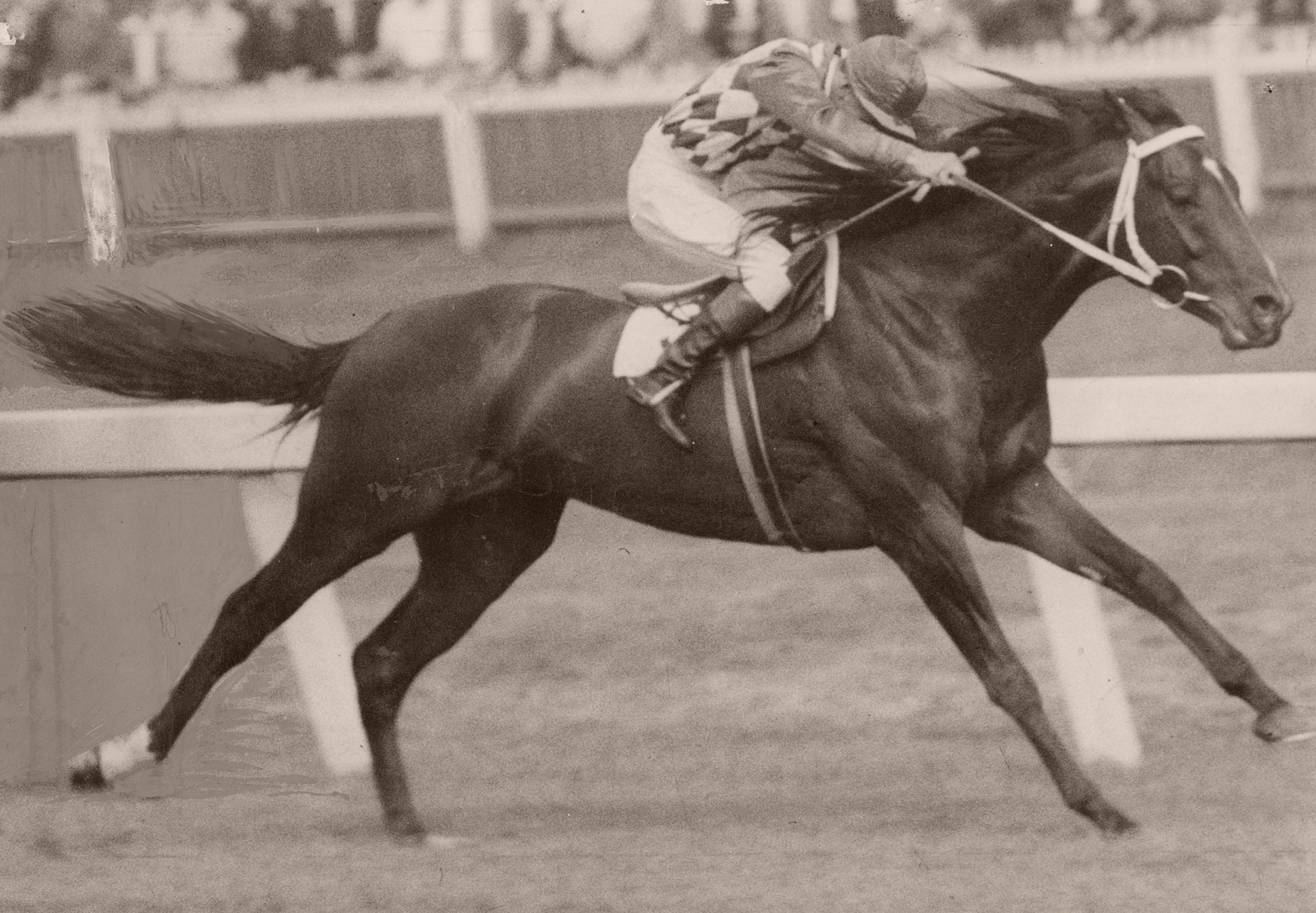
- Comic Court, 1949 winner
- Class: Group 1
- Location: Flemington Racecourse, Melbourne, Australia
- Inaugurated: 1948 as Craiglee Stakes
- Race type: Thoroughbred
- Sponsor: Crown (2024 - 2026)

Race information
- Distance: 1,600 metres
- Surface: Turf
- Track: Left-handed
- Qualification: Three year old and older that are not maidens
- Weight: Weight for age
- Purse: A$750,000 (2026)
- Bonuses: Winner exempt from ballot in the Caulfield Cup

The Makybe Diva Stakes, previously called the Craiglee Stakes, is a Victoria Racing Club Group 1 Thoroughbred horse race at Weight for age conditions for three year olds and older, over a distance of 1,600 metres held at Flemington Racecourse in Melbourne, Australia in September.

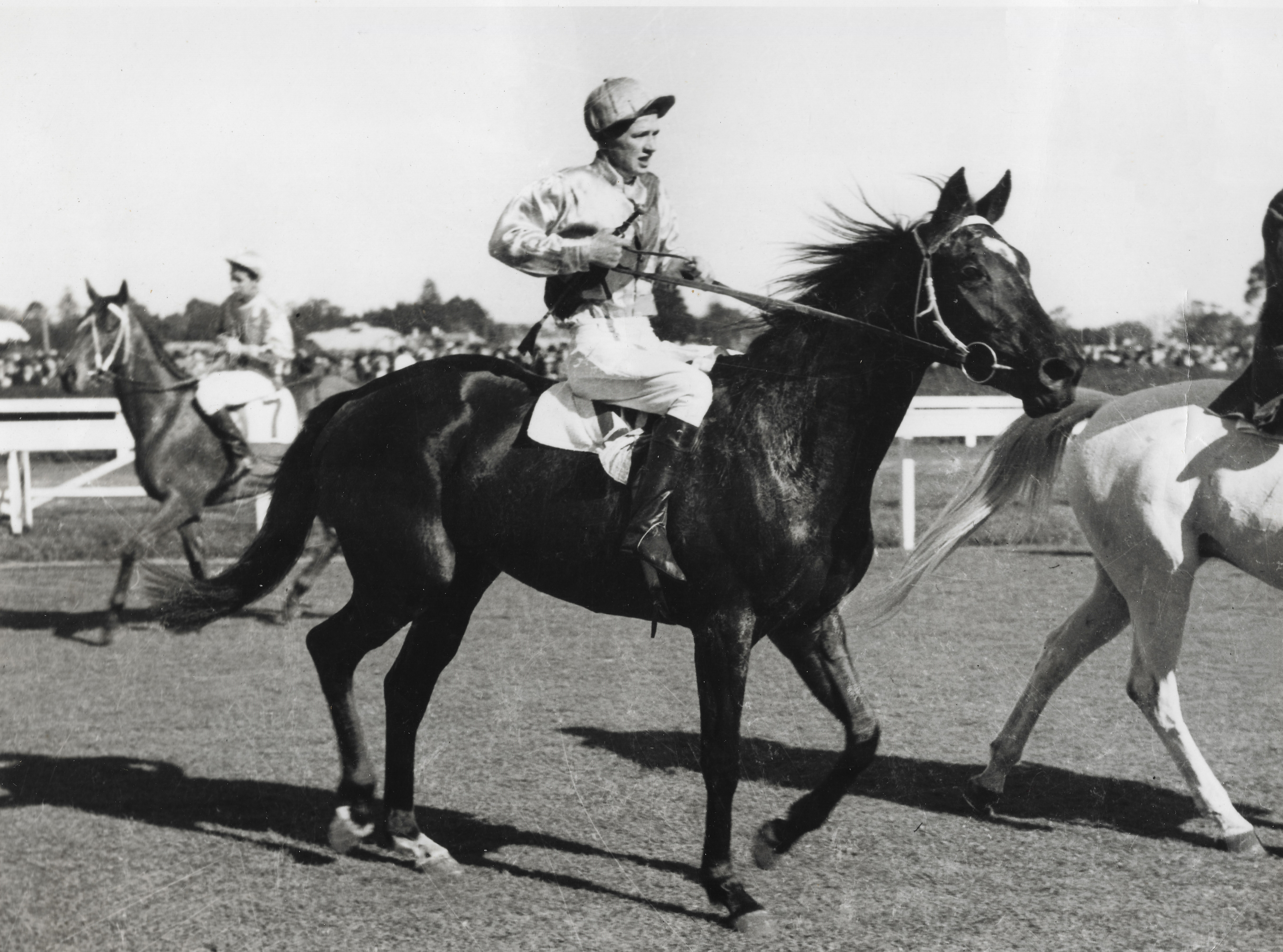
Chicquita, 1950 & 1951 winner

== History ==
Originally named the Craiglee Stakes after the home in Sunbury of Wilfred Henry Johnston (1864 - 1951), chairman of the VRC stipendiary stewards between 1924 and 1945. Since 2007, the event has been registered and re-named in dedication to Australian Thoroughbred champion racehorse Makybe Diva, winner of three consecutive Melbourne Cups 2003-05.

=== 1948 racebook ===
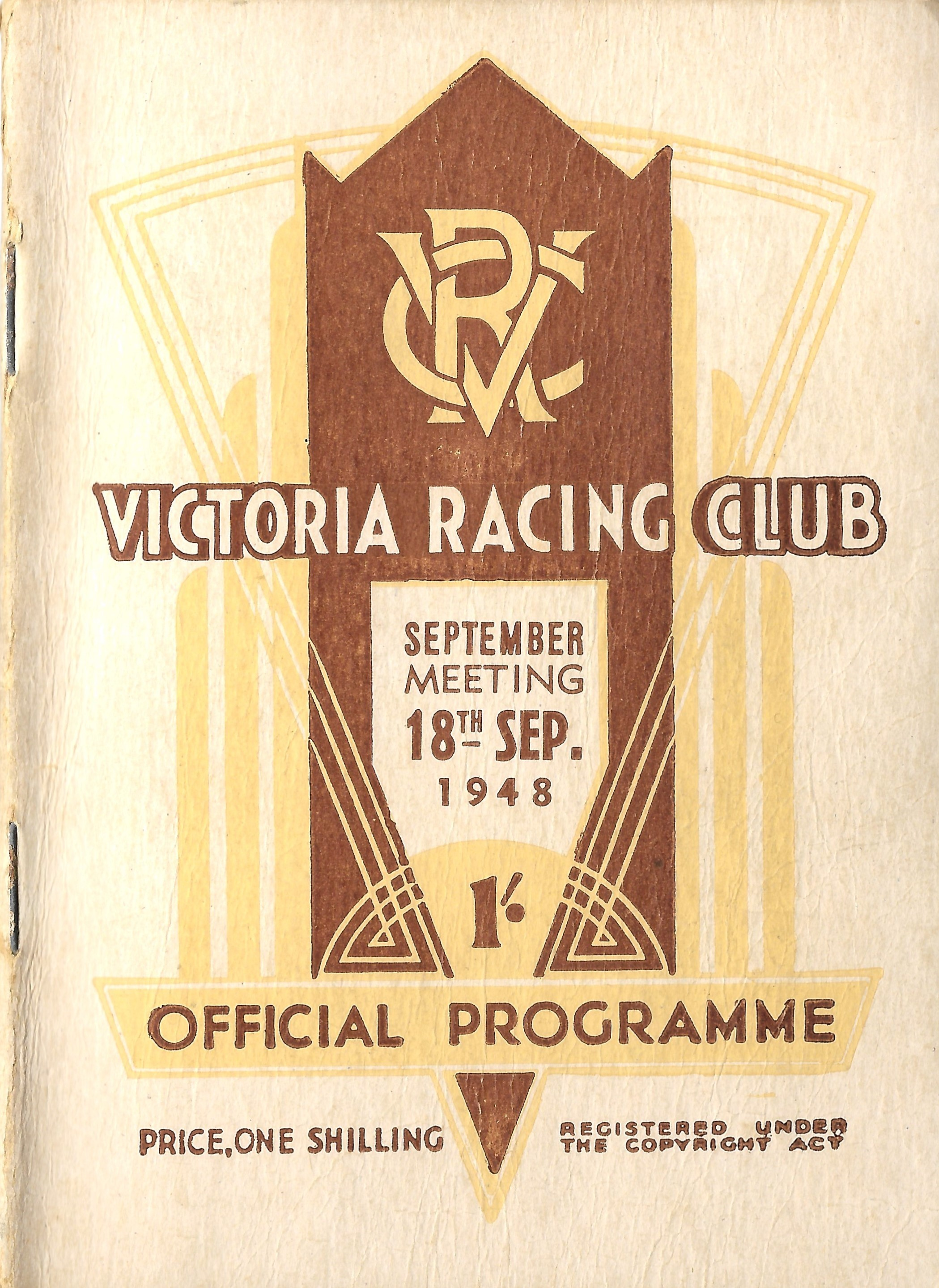
1948 VRC Craiglee Stakes racebook front cover

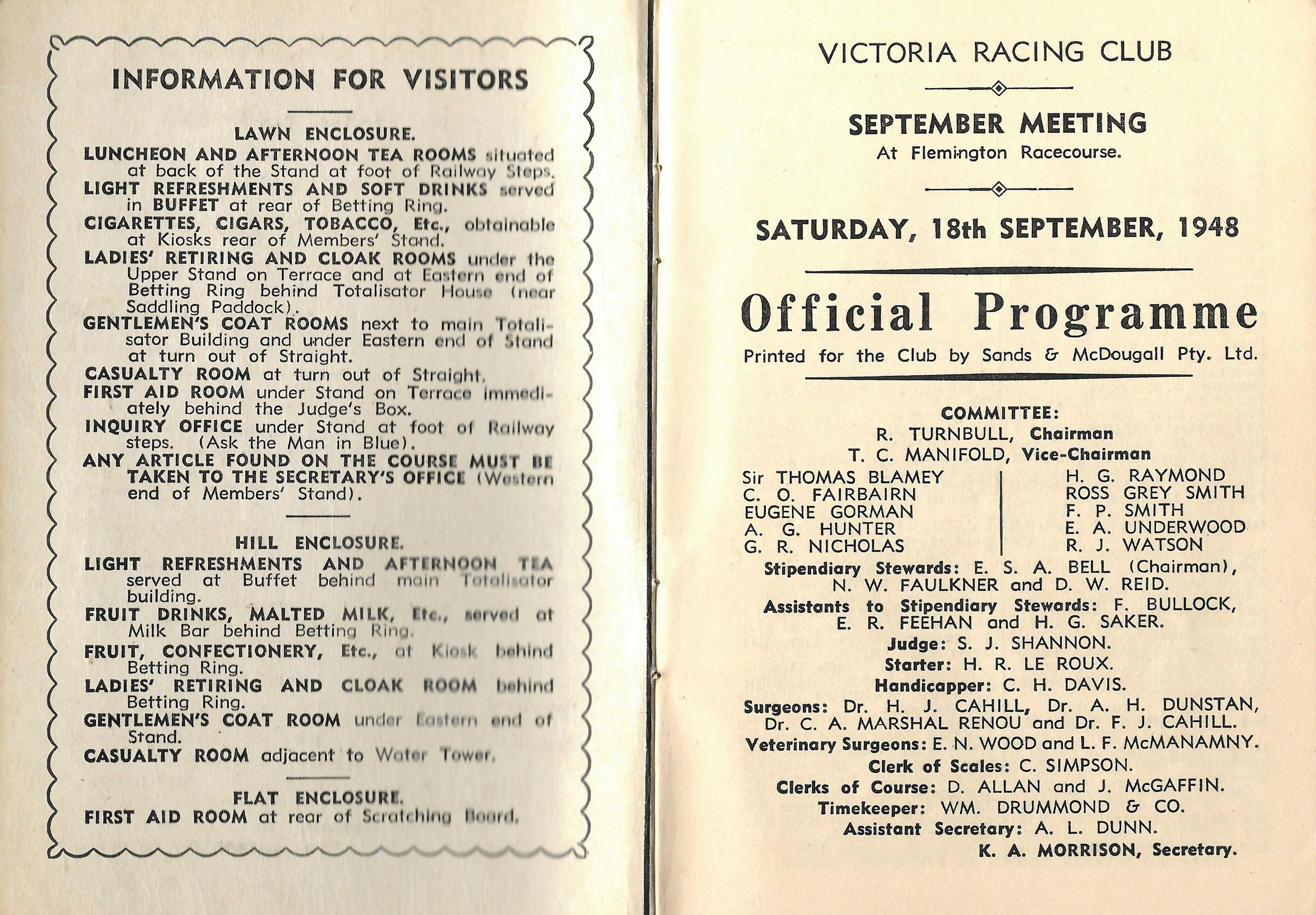
1948 VRC Craiglee Stakes raceday officials

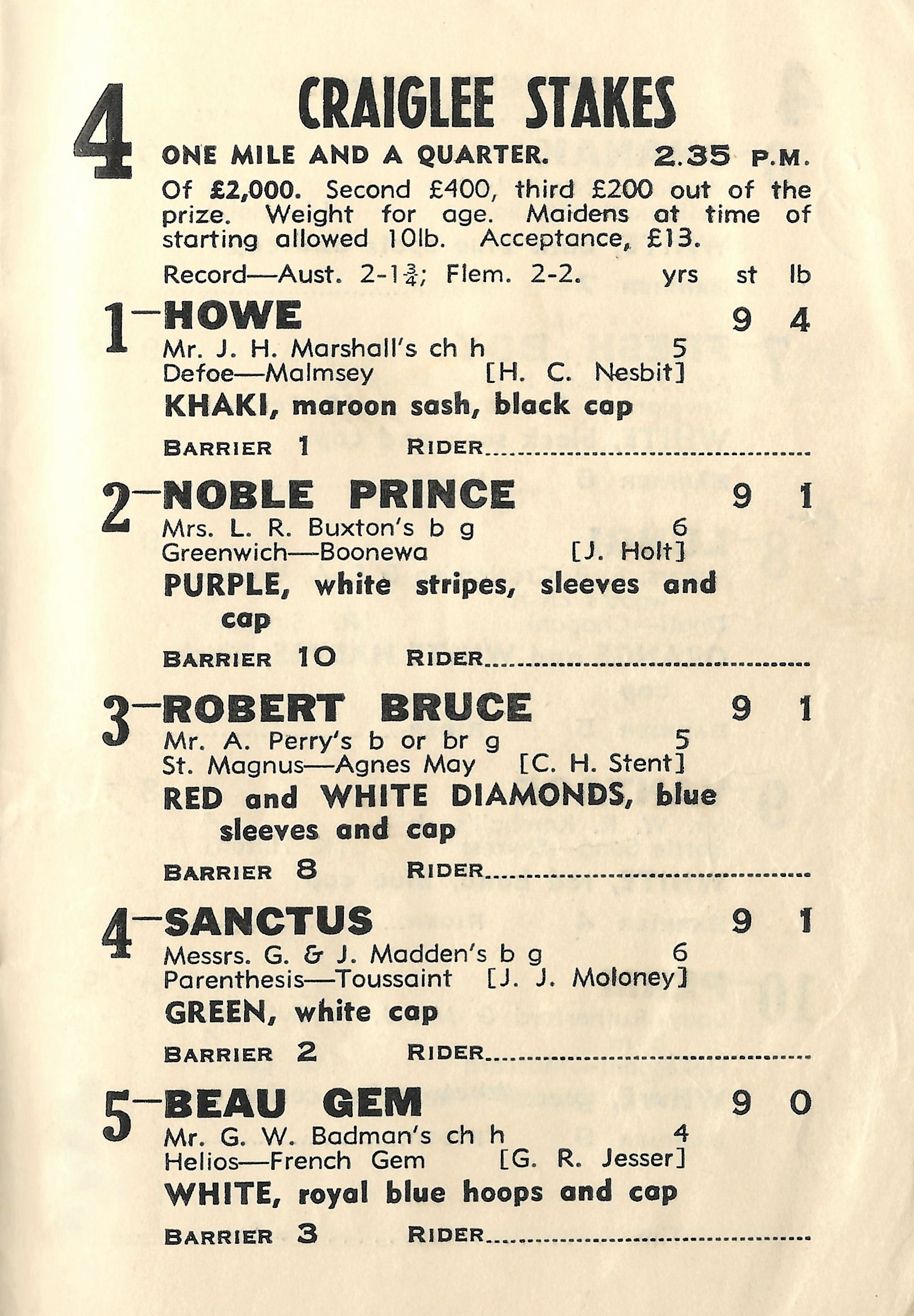
1948 VRC Craiglee Stakes starters and results

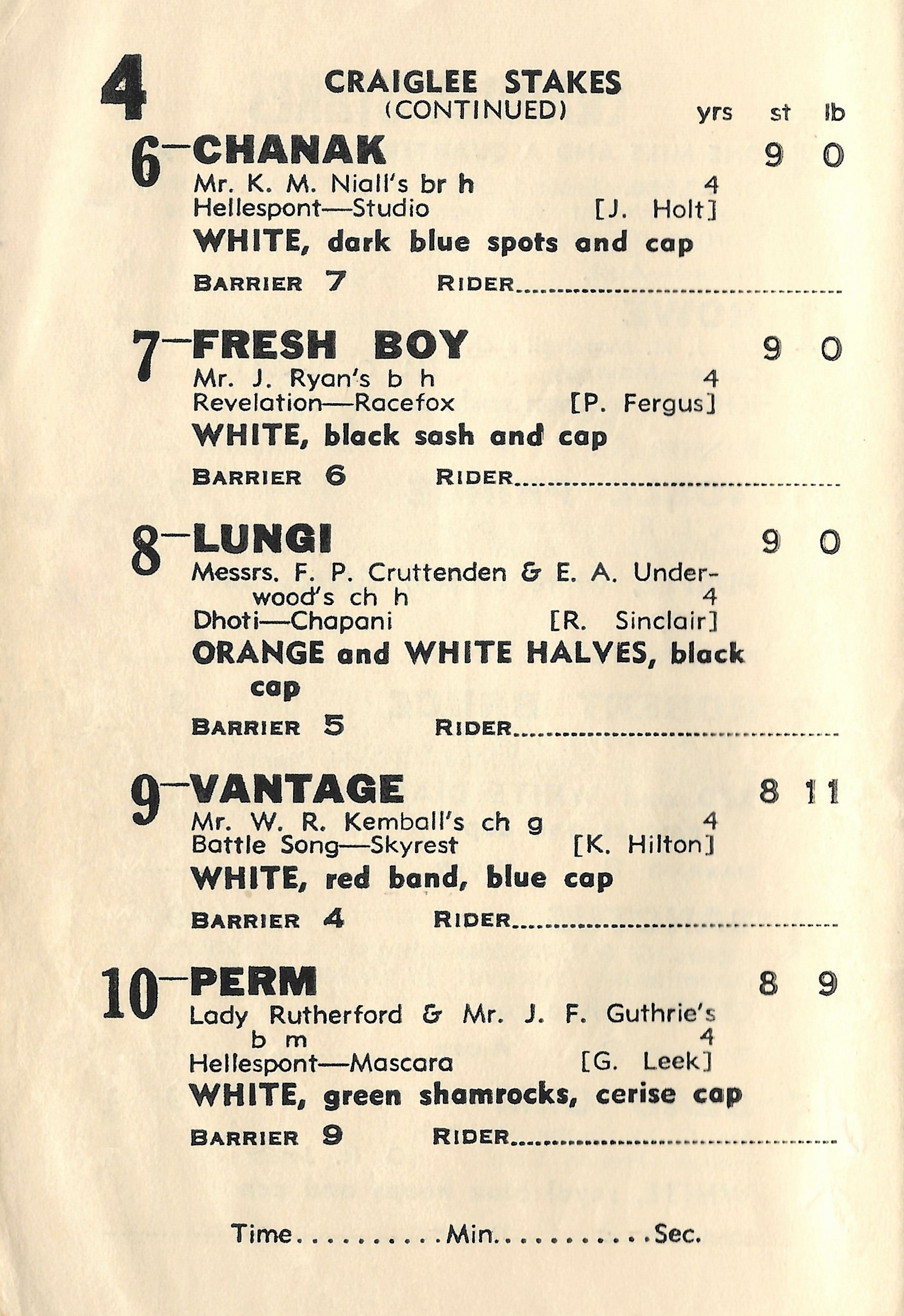
1948 VRC Craiglee Stakes showing the winner, Lungi

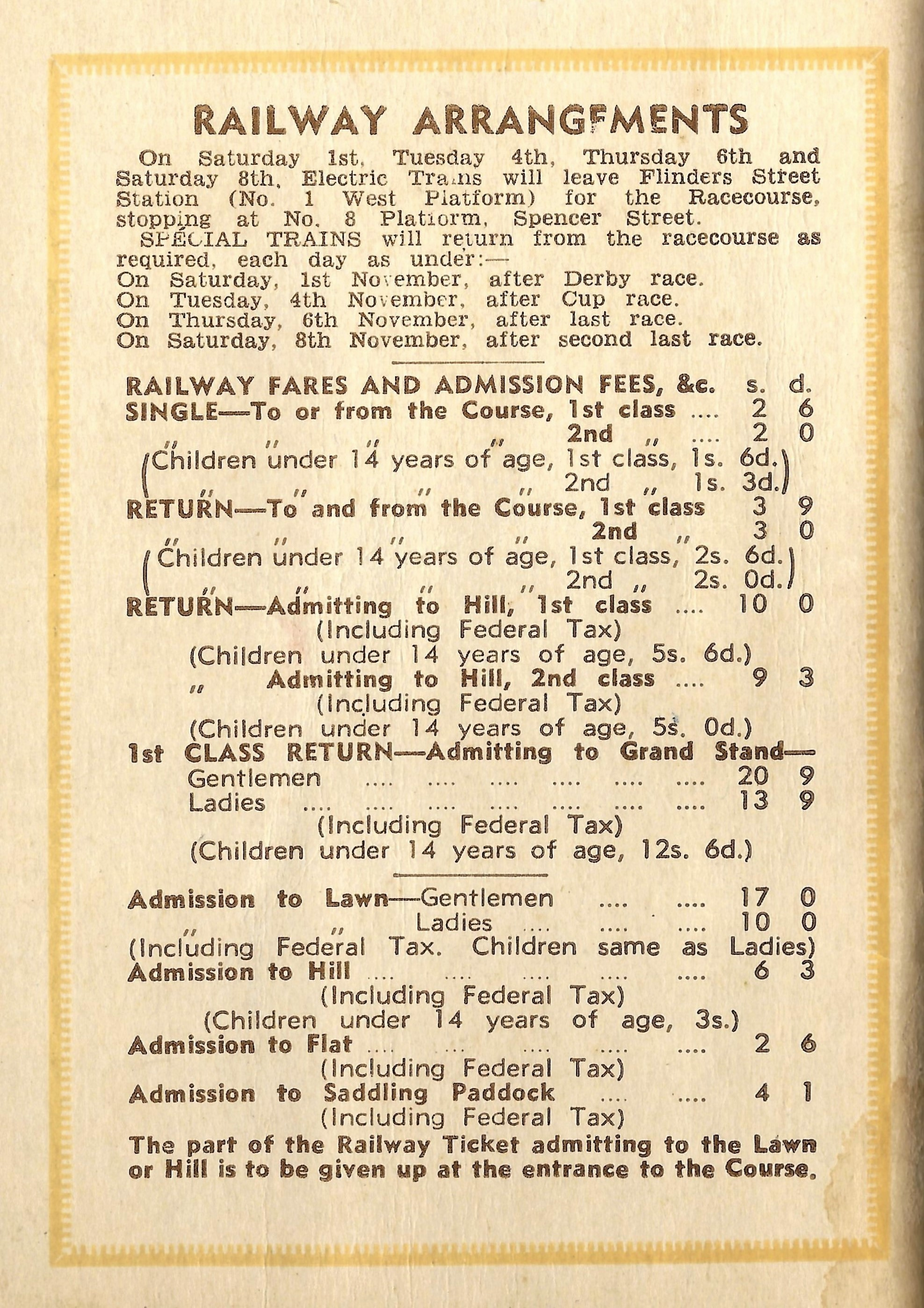
Back cover showing railway arrangements and charges at the entrance gates

=== Name ===
- 1948–2006 - Craiglee Stakes
- 2007 onwards - Makybe Diva Stakes

=== Distance ===
- 1948–1964 - 1 1/4 miles (~2000 metres)
- 1965–1971 - 1 mile (~1600 metres)
- 1972 onwards - 1600 metres

=== Grade ===
- 1948–1978 - Principal Race
- 1979–2012 - Group 2 race
- 2013 onwards - Group 1 race

== Winners ==
The following are past winners of the race.

- 2026 - Sheza Alibi
- 2025 - Mr Brightside
- 2024 - Mr Brightside
- 2023 - Mr Brightside
- 2022 - I'm Thunderstruck
- 2021 - Incentivise
- 2020 - Fierce Impact
- 2019 - Gatting
- 2018 - Grunt
- 2017 - Humidor
- 2016 - Palentino
- 2015 - Fawkner
- 2014 - Dissident
- 2013 - Foreteller
- 2012 - Southern Speed
- 2011 - Littorio
- 2010 - Shocking
- 2009 - Vigor
- 2008 - Weekend Hussler
- 2007 - Marasco
- 2006 - Pompeii Ruler
- 2005 - Confectioner
- 2004 - Hug's Dancer
- 2003 - Pentastic
- 2002 - Northerly
- 2001 - Native Jazz
- 2000 - Go Flash Go
- 1999 - Sky Heights
- 1998 - Umrum
- 1997 - Marble Halls
- 1996 - Saleous
- 1995 - Jeune
- 1994 - Mahogany
- 1993 - Mannerism
- 1992 - Star Of The Realm
- 1991 - Durbridge
- 1990 - Zabeel
- 1989 - Apollo Run
- 1988 - High Regard
- 1987 - Military Plume
- 1986 - King Phoenix
- 1985 - Fine Offer
- 1984 - Prolific
- 1983 - Pleach
- 1982 - Rose Of Kingston
- 1981 - Sovereign Red
- 1980 - Big Print
- 1979 - Dulcify
- 1978 - Family Of Man
- 1977 - Ming Dynasty
- 1976 - How Now
- 1975 - Tontonan
- 1974 - All Shot
- 1973 - Gay Icarus
- 1972 - Gossiper
- 1971 - Dual Choice
- 1970 - Gay Poss
- 1969 - Rain Lover
- 1968 - Lowland
- 1967 - Star Belle
- 1966 - Tobin Bronze
- 1965 - Light Fingers
- 1964 - Sir Dane
- 1963 - Havelock
- 1962 - Aquanita
- 1961 - Lord
- 1960 - Nilarco
- 1959 - Vogel
- 1958 - White Hills
- 1957 - Sailor's Guide
- 1956 - Sailor's Guide
- 1955 - Cromis
- 1954 - Acramitis
- 1953 - Aldershot
- 1952 - Great Western
- 1951 - Chicquita
- 1950 - Chicquita
- 1949 - Comic Court
- 1948 - Lungi

== See also ==
- Bobbie Lewis Quality
- Let's Elope Stakes
- Lexus Archer Stakes
- List of Australian Group races
- Group races
