= Zaaki =

British-bred Thoroughbred racehorse

- Sire: Leroidesanimaux
- Grandsire: Candy Stripes
- Dam: Kesara
- Damsire: Sadler's Wells
- Sex: Gelding
- Foaled: 15 February 2015
- Country: Great Britain
- Colour: Bay or Brown
- Breeder: Kirsten Rausing
- Owner: CE Holt et al.
- Trainer: Mohamed Moubarak (2017); Sir Michael Stoute (2018-2020); Annabel Neasham (2021 onwards)
- Record: 48: 15–8–10
- Earnings: AU$11,102,682

Major wins
- Paradise Stakes (2019); Diomed Stakes (2019); Strensall Stakes (2019); Hollindale Stakes (2021, 2022, 2023); Doomben Cup (2021); Q22 (2021); Tramway Stakes (2021, 2022); Underwood Stakes (2021); Mackinnon Stakes (2021, 2022)

Awards
- Australian Champion Middle Distance Racehorse (2021/22)

Zaaki (foaled 15 February 2015) is a British-bred and Australian-trained thoroughbred racehorse that has won multiple Group One races.

== Background ==
Ahmad Alotaibi bought Zaaki for 40,000 Guineas at the 2016 Tattersalls October Yearling Sale out of the Staffordstown draft.

== Racing career ==
Originally trained by Mohamed Moubarak, Zaaki went winless from 4 starts in the 2017 season.

In 2018 he was transferred to the stables of Sir Michael Stoute and was successful at his first start for his new trainer on the 21st of April at Thirsk.

In 2019 he won the Strensall Stakes at York, the Diomed Stakes at Epsom and the Paradise Stakes at Ascot.

Zaaki was sold at the 2020 Tattersalls Autumn Horses in Training Sale for 150,000 Guineas. He was purchased by Blandford Bloodstock with the intention to be raced and trained in Australia.

In Australia, Zaaki has won four Group One races, the Doomben Cup, Underwood Stakes and Mackinnon Stakes twice.

On 19 March 2022 Zaaki, ridden by Jamie Kah, won the $5.43M All-Star Mile at Flemington over 1600m from I'm Thunderstruck and Streets of Avalon.

== Pedigree ==
Pedigree of Zaaki (GB) 2015
Sire Leroidesanimaux (BRZ) 2000	Candy Stripes (USA); 1982	Blushing Groom	Red God
Sire Leroidesanimaux (BRZ) 2000	Candy Stripes (USA); 1982	Blushing Groom	Runaway Bride
Sire Leroidesanimaux (BRZ) 2000	Candy Stripes (USA); 1982	Bubble Company	Lyphard
Sire Leroidesanimaux (BRZ) 2000	Candy Stripes (USA); 1982	Bubble Company	Prodice
Sire Leroidesanimaux (BRZ) 2000	Dissemble (GB); 1989	Ahonoora	Lorenzaccio
Sire Leroidesanimaux (BRZ) 2000	Dissemble (GB); 1989	Ahonoora	Helen Nichols
Sire Leroidesanimaux (BRZ) 2000	Dissemble (GB); 1989	Kerali	High Line
Sire Leroidesanimaux (BRZ) 2000	Dissemble (GB); 1989	Kerali	Sookera
Dam Kesara (GB) 2005	Sadler's Wells (USA); 1981	Northern Dancer	Nearctic
Dam Kesara (GB) 2005	Sadler's Wells (USA); 1981	Northern Dancer	Natalma
Dam Kesara (GB) 2005	Sadler's Wells (USA); 1981	Fairy Bridge	Bold Reason
Dam Kesara (GB) 2005	Sadler's Wells (USA); 1981	Fairy Bridge	Special
Dam Kesara (GB) 2005	Kaldounya (GB); 1997	Kaldoun	Caro
Dam Kesara (GB) 2005	Kaldounya (GB); 1997	Kaldoun	Katana
Dam Kesara (GB) 2005	Kaldounya (GB); 1997	Minya	Blushing Groom
Dam Kesara (GB) 2005	Kaldounya (GB); 1997	Minya	Riverqueen
