= Cascadian (horse) =

British-bred thoroughbred racehorse

- Racing Silks of Godolphin
- Sire: New Approach
- Grandsire: Galileo
- Dam: Falls of Lora
- Damsire: Street Cry
- Sex: Gelding
- Foaled: 26 March 2015
- Country: Great Britain
- Colour: Chestnut
- Breeder: Godolphin
- Owner: Godolphin
- Trainer: André Fabre (2017-2018); James Cummings (2019 onwards)
- Record: 53:12–6–9
- Earnings: AU$10,641,275

Major wins
- Doncaster Prelude (2020); Doncaster Mile (2021); Peter Young Stakes (2022); All Aged Stakes (2022); Hill Stakes (2022); Craven Plate (2022); Australian Cup (2023, 2024)

Cascadian (foaled 26 March 2015) is a British bred and Australian raced Group 1 winning racehorse.

== Background ==
A homebred for Godolphin, Cascadian is the son of Epsom Derby hero New Approach and is of three winners out of the Street Cry mare Falls Of Lora, whose four wins included the Group III UAE Oaks and the Listed Coral Distaff at Sandown.

== Racing career ==
Cascadian began his racing career in France under the guidance of trainer André Fabre. He raced on six occasions for three wins and two seconds, with his best result a second placing when beaten a short neck in the Group 1 Prix Jean Prat at Deauville.

Having been gelded, Cascadian was then transferred to Godolphin's training operation in Australia to continue his career. Godolphin's French representative Lisa-Jane Graffard explained, “We’ve had good results with horses that we've sent there from 1400 to 1600 metres.”

Cascadian proved successful in Australia when winning the 2020 Doncaster Prelude. He finally achieved Group 1 success when winning the 2021 Doncaster Mile at Randwick when ridden by Jamie Kah.

Cascadian won his second Group One race when successful in the 2022 All Aged Stakes when ridden by James McDonald, defeating Tofane by a length.

== Pedigree ==
Pedigree of Cascadian (GB) 2015
Sire New Approach (IRE) 2005	Galileo (IRE); 1998	Sadler's Wells	Northern Dancer
Sire New Approach (IRE) 2005	Galileo (IRE); 1998	Sadler's Wells	Fairy Bridge
Sire New Approach (IRE) 2005	Galileo (IRE); 1998	Urban Sea	Miswaki
Sire New Approach (IRE) 2005	Galileo (IRE); 1998	Urban Sea	Allegretta
Sire New Approach (IRE) 2005	Park Express (IRE); 1983	Ahonoora	Lorenzaccio
Sire New Approach (IRE) 2005	Park Express (IRE); 1983	Ahonoora	Helen Nichols
Sire New Approach (IRE) 2005	Park Express (IRE); 1983	Matcher	Match
Sire New Approach (IRE) 2005	Park Express (IRE); 1983	Matcher	Lachine
Dam Falls of Lora (IRE) 2009	Street Cry (IRE); 1998	Machiavellian	Mr. Prospector
Dam Falls of Lora (IRE) 2009	Street Cry (IRE); 1998	Machiavellian	Coup de Folie
Dam Falls of Lora (IRE) 2009	Street Cry (IRE); 1998	Helen Street	Troy
Dam Falls of Lora (IRE) 2009	Street Cry (IRE); 1998	Helen Street	Waterway
Dam Falls of Lora (IRE) 2009	Firth of Lorne (IRE); 1999	Danehill	Danzig
Dam Falls of Lora (IRE) 2009	Firth of Lorne (IRE); 1999	Danehill	Razyana
Dam Falls of Lora (IRE) 2009	Firth of Lorne (IRE); 1999	Kerrera	Diesis
Dam Falls of Lora (IRE) 2009	Firth of Lorne (IRE); 1999	Kerrera	Rimosa's Pet
