= Gold Coast Turf Club =

Australian horse racing organization

Coordinates: 28.0029°S 153.4050°E

Gold Coast Turf Club is an Australian horse racing organization based in Surfers Paradise, Queensland, Australia.

== Race track ==
The racecourse holds numerous Thoroughbred racehorse meetings each year. The feature event is the annual Gold Coast Cup, which is held on the last Thursday of September.

The grass track can hold various distances up to 2100m. The ground has a large members stand, and grassed areas to view the track from. Most meetings held at the track have full TAB coverage, with on-site bookmakers and totalisator facilities available.

== History ==
Racing began on the 1890s when an occasional public meeting was run in the old cane paddocks of Bundall, not far from the present Gold Coast Turf Club.

Regular racing at its present headquarters began on 15 May 1946 when the club was known as the Southport and District Amateur Race Club (formed on 17 March 1946). Racing originally was on a dirt track.

In January 1971, the club began conducting races every Saturday. In August of that year the Club launched the Newmarket-Gold Coast Cup three-day carnival on a quality grass track.

A function centre on-site often holds events such as parties, weddings and business meetings.
