= Australian Thoroughbred racing awards =

Horse racing awards

The Australian Thoroughbred racing awards are given annually in Australian thoroughbred horse racing. Voting on various categories is done by members of the Australian Racing Writers Association and include:

- Australian Champion Racehorse of the Year
- Australian Champion Two Year Old
- Australian Champion Three Year Old
- Australian Champion Sprinter
- Australian Champion Middle Distance Racehorse
- Australian Champion Stayer
- Australian Champion Filly or Mare
- Australian Champion International Performer
- Australian Champion Jumper
- Australian Champion Trainer

The equivalent in the United States is the Eclipse Awards, in Canada the Sovereign Awards, and in Europe, the Cartier Racing Awards.
