= Mr Dinos =

Irish-bred Thoroughbred racehorse

- Sire: Desert King
- Grandsire: Danehill
- Dam: Spear Dance
- Damsire: Gay Fandango
- Sex: Stallion
- Foaled: 14 April 1999
- Country: Ireland
- Colour: Bay
- Breeder: Mocklerstown House Stud
- Owner: Constantine Shiacolas
- Trainer: Paul Cole
- Record: 17: 6-4-1
- Earnings: £380,957

Major wins
- Prix Berteux (2002); Prix Royal-Oak (2002); Henry II Stakes (2003); Ascot Gold Cup (2003)

Mr Dinos (foaled 14 April 1999) is an Irish-bred, British-trained Thoroughbred racehorse and sire best known for his win in 2003 Ascot Gold Cup. After finishing second on his only start as a juvenile in 2001 he improved to become a top-class stayer in the following year. After winning two minor races in spring he was narrowly beaten in the Queen's Vase and the Northumberland Plate before recording his first major win in the Prix Berteux. In the autumn he finished only fifth in the St Leger but then won the Group One Prix Royal-Oak. He reached his peak in the first half of 2003 when he won the Henry II Stakes and then recorded an emphatic, six-length victory in the Gold Cup. His subsequent career was dogged by injury problems and he never won again, retiring from racing in 2005 with a record of six wins and five placings from seventeen starts. He has made little impact as a breeding stallion.

== Background ==
Mr Dinos is a bay horse with a small white star bred in Ireland by the County Tipperary-based Mocklerstown House Stud. As a yearling he was sent to the Goffs sale in October 2000 and was bought for IR£40,000 by Emerald Bloodstock. In the following April he was sent to England for the Tattersalls "breeze-up" sale, for which horses are galloped in public before being auctioned. He was bought for 42,000 guineas by the trainer Paul Cole. Throughout his racing career Mr Dinos was owned by the Cypriot businessman Constantinos Shiacolas and trained by Cole at the Whatcombe Estate near Wantage in Oxfordshire.

He was from the first crop of foals sired by Desert King, an Irish horse who won the Irish Derby in 1997. As a breeding stallion he fathered several major winners and is best known as the sire of the outstanding Australian-trained racemare Makybe Diva.

Mr Dinos's dam Spear Dance was an unraced mare who produced several other winners including Risk Material who won the Derrinstown Stud Derby Trial in 1998. She was a descendant of the British broodmare Amorelle (foaled in 1919), making her a distant relative of The Oaks winner Homeward Bound.

== Racing career ==
=== 2001: two-year-old season ===
Mr Dinos made his racecourse debut in a maiden race over seven furlongs at Ascot Racecourse on 27 July 2001. Starting a 14/1 outsider in a six runner-field he raced in second place for most of the way before finishing runner-up, beaten a neck by the odds-on favourite Sohaib.

=== 2002: three-year-old season ===
After an absence of eight months Mr Dinos returned in an eleven furlong maiden at Kempton Park Racecourse on 1 April in which he started favourite but finished third behind Mawaheb and Dileer, beaten three and a half lengths by the winner. He recorded his first success two weeks later in a maiden over one and a half miles at Newmarket Racecourse, taking the lead three furlongs out and winning by four lengths from the Barry Hills-trained Lakatoi. The colt was stepped up in distance at York Racecourse in May and started the 11/8 favourite against three opponents for a minor stakes race over one and three quarter miles. Ridden by Kevin Darley he took the lead five furlongs from the finish and kept on strongly in the closing stages to win by two lengths.

At Royal Ascot on 21 June Mr Dinos was moved up in class and distance to contest the Group Three Queen's Vase over two miles and started second favourite behind the Irish challenger Black Sam Bellamy. He was amongst the leaders from the start before staying on in the straight and finished second, beaten half a length by Mamool, with Ancestor a length away in third. Eight days after his run at Ascot, the colt was matched against older horses in the Northumberland Plate a handicap race over one and three quarter miles at Newcastle Racecourse. Assigned a weight of 115 pounds he was ridden by the lightweight jockey Franny Norton and was made the 3/1 favourite against fifteen rivals. Mr Dinos took the lead half a mile from the finish and fought back after being overtaken to finish second in a photo finish, beaten a head by the six-year-old gelding Bangalore. Four weeks later Mr Dinos was sent to France for the Group Three Prix Berteux over 3000 metres at Vichy. Ridden by Gerald Mosse, he took the lead from the start, quickly opened up a clear lead won "easily" by the and a half lengths from the filly Ivy League. After the race Paul Cole explained "He had to do it the hard way. We didn't want to mess around and let him get swooped on by his rivals – we killed them off instead".

On 14 September Mr Dinos was one of eight three-year-olds to contest the classic St Leger over fourteen and a half furlongs at Doncaster Racecourse. He took the lead after a quarter mile and led the field until the final turn but faded in the closing stages and finished fifth behind Bollin Eric, Highest, Bandari and Mamool. Cole later commented that the colt "went too fast" in the race. On 27 October the colt returned to France for the Group One Prix Royal-Oak over 3100 metres at Longchamp Racecourse in which he was ridden by the French jockey Dominique Boeuf. He was made the 3.6/1 third choice in the betting behind the André Fabre-trained pair Morozov (Prix Hubert de Chaudenay) and Bernimixa (Prix de Pomone) whilst the other runners included Sulk and Cut Quartz (Prix Kergorlay). As in his previous French race he took the lead from the start and soon opened up a clear lead. He kept on well in the straight and won by two lengths from Sulk with a gap of four lengths back to Morozov in third. His victory made him the first British-trained winner of the race since Moonax triumphed in 1994. After the race Boeuf commented "I controlled the race from start to finish. Mr Cole told me to go on if no-one else did, but not to make the pace too quick... he ran on again in the final furlong".

=== 2003: four-year-old season ===
Mr Dinos began his third campaign in the Group Two Henry II Stakes over two miles at Sandown Park Racecourse on 26 May in which he was ridden by Frankie Dettori. He started 6/1 second favourite behind the Doncaster Cup winner Boreas with the other runners including Persian Punch, Bangalore and Hugs Dancer (Ebor Handicap). After racing in third place he took the lead approaching the final furlong and drew away in the closing stages to win by two and a half lengths and a neck from Pole Star and Kasthari. Dettori, who was contracted to ride Mamool in the season's major staying events said of the winner "I like him a lot. That was a tremendous performance first time out. He's done well over the winter. He's going to be very hard to get by. We will give him a big race but he must be a big danger in the Gold Cup."

Mr Dinos was then aimed, as expected, at the Group One Ascot Gold Cup over two and a half miles. The build-up to the race was exceptionally difficult for Paul Cole as seventy percent of the horses at Whatcombe were affected by a viral infection and Mr Dinos had to be kept in isolation, attended only by his stable lad Tom Pirie. Kieren Fallon took over the ride in Gold Cup 19 June and Mr Dinos started 3/1 second favourite behind his old rival Mamool. Black Sam Bellamy, Pole Star, Kasthari and Persian Punch were again in the field whilst the other runners were Fight Your Corner (Chester Vase), Tholjanah (Noel Murless Stakes), Jardines Lookout (Goodwood Cup), Savannah Bay (Prix de Lutèce), Pugin (runner-up in the Irish St Leger) and Alcazar. Persian Punch set the pace with Mr Dinos settling third before moving up into second place with nine furlongs left to run. Fallon sent the colt into the lead three furlongs out and Mr Dinos "forged clear" in the straight to win "easily" by six lengths from Persian Punch. After the race Fallon said "I rode a horse who could take me there. He travelled well, he travelled all the way, even though he was a bit lazy. When I switched him on he found another gear and that's the sign of a good horse". Cole commented "I've never had a runner in the Gold Cup and it's a race I've always wanted to win. I can't believe it's happened. We've had a terrible six weeks and we isolated him, and we've taken every single possible move to stop him getting the virus. It means a lot to everybody".

Mr Dinos was off the course for three and a half months before returning for the Group One Prix du Cadran over 4000 metres at Longchamp on 5 October. He started the 8/11 favourite but after reaching third place in the straight he could make no further progress and finished sixth behind Westerner.

=== 2004: five-year-old season ===
On his first run of 2004 Mr Dinos started joint-favourite for the Yorkshire Cup on 13 May but finished fourth, nine lengths behind the winner Millenary. As in 2003, the horse prepared for the Gold Cup with a run in the Henry II Stakes and started 2/1 favourite under top weight of 131 pounds. He finished second to the four-year-old Papineau (carrying 124 pounds) but appeared somewhat unlucky as he was hampered when the winner hung to the right in the final furlong. Fallon claimed that he and Mr Dinos would have won the race had they not been "stopped in our tracks".

In the Gold Cup at Ascot on 17 June Mr Dinos, with Fallon in the saddle, started 5/4 favourite ahead of Papineau, Westerner, Brian Boru and Royal Rebel. After tracking the leaders Fallon sent the favourite into the lead three furlongs out, but Mr Dinos faded in the straight and finished sixth of the thirteen runners behind Papineau. After the race Cole reported that the horse was "very sore" and "jarred-up" after racing on the "lightning-fast" ground and added "I'll be more careful where I run him in future". In fact Mr Dinos did not race again in 2004.

=== 2005: six-year-old season ===
Mr Dinos remained in training as a six-year-old but failed to regain his old form. After an absence of a year he started a 20/1 outsider for the 2005 "Ascot" Gold Cup which was run at York and never looked likely to win, finishing eighth behind Westerner. He was then dropped in class for the Listed Esher Stakes over two miles at Sandown on 2 July. After racing in second place for most of the way he dropped away in the straight and finished fifth of the seven runners. He suffered further injury problems and was retired from racing at the end of the year. Cole said that the horse was never the same after the 2004 Gold Cup and added "He's a horse who owes us nothing, and the best thing to do is retire him".

== Stud record ==
Mr Dinos was retired from racing to become a National Hunt breeding stallion at the Tally-Ho Stud in County Westmeath. He has sired a few minor winners from his early crops but is yet to make any real impact. In 2011 he was moved to the County Kilkenny-based Whytemount Stud where he stood at a fee of 1000 euros in 2016.

== Assessment and awards ==
In the International Classification for 2003 Nr Dinos was rated the 49th best horse in the world with a rating of 119. In the inaugural edition of the World Thoroughbred Racehorse Rankings Mr Dinos was given a rating of 117, making the 57th best racehorse in the world.

Paul Cole described Mr Dinos as "strong, tough and blessed with the most amazing temperament" and "the best stayer I ever trained".

== Pedigree ==
Pedigree of Mr Dinos, bay stallion, 1999
Sire Desert King (IRE) 1994	Danehill (USA); 1986	Danzig	Northern Dancer
Sire Desert King (IRE) 1994	Danehill (USA); 1986	Danzig	Pas de Nom
Sire Desert King (IRE) 1994	Danehill (USA); 1986	Razyana	His Majesty
Sire Desert King (IRE) 1994	Danehill (USA); 1986	Razyana	Spring Adieu
Sire Desert King (IRE) 1994	Sabaah (USA); 1988	Nureyev	Northern Dancer
Sire Desert King (IRE) 1994	Sabaah (USA); 1988	Nureyev	Special
Sire Desert King (IRE) 1994	Sabaah (USA); 1988	Dish Dash	Bustino
Sire Desert King (IRE) 1994	Sabaah (USA); 1988	Dish Dash	Loose Cover
Dam Spear Dance (IRE) 1982	Gay Fandango (USA); 1972	Forli	Aristophanes
Dam Spear Dance (IRE) 1982	Gay Fandango (USA); 1972	Forli	Trevisa
Dam Spear Dance (IRE) 1982	Gay Fandango (USA); 1972	Gay Violin	Sir Gaylord
Dam Spear Dance (IRE) 1982	Gay Fandango (USA); 1972	Gay Violin	Blue Violin
Dam Spear Dance (IRE) 1982	Lancette (IRE); 1971	Double Jump	Rustam
Dam Spear Dance (IRE) 1982	Lancette (IRE); 1971	Double Jump	Fair Bid
Dam Spear Dance (IRE) 1982	Lancette (IRE); 1971	Persian Union	Persian Gulf
Dam Spear Dance (IRE) 1982	Lancette (IRE); 1971	Persian Union	Reconcile (Family: 3-l)

- Mr Dinos was inbred 4 × 4 to Northern Dancer, meaning that this stallion appears twice in the fourth generation of his pedigree.
