= Australian Champion Stayer =

The Australian Champion Stayer is awarded annually to the Thoroughbred horse whose performances in Australia over distances of 2,200 metres (approximately 11 furlongs) and greater are deemed to be the superior to its rivals. It has been awarded since the 1999 - 2000 season.

Australian Champion Stayer
Year / Season	Horse	Age	Sex	Breeding
1999-2000	Tie the Knot	5yo	G	Nassipour (USA) – Whisked (AUS)
2000-2001	Brew	6yo	G	Sir Tristram (IRE) - Horlicks (NZ)
2001-2002	Ethereal	4yo	M	Rhythm (USA) - Romanee Conti (NZ)
2002-2003	Media Puzzle	6yo	G	Theatrical (IRE) - Market Slide (USA)
2003-2004	Makybe Diva	5yo	M	Desert King (IRE) - Tugela (USA)
2004-2005	Makybe Diva	6yo	M	Desert King (IRE) - Tugela (USA)
2005-2006	Makybe Diva	7yo	M	Desert King (IRE) - Tugela (USA)
2006-2007	Delta Blues	5yo	H	Dance in the Dark (JPN) - Dixie Splash (USA)
2007-2008	Efficient	4yo	G	Zabeel (NZ) - Refused The Dance (NZ)
2008-2009	Viewed	5yo	H	Scenic (IRE) – Lovers Knot (NZ)
2009-2010	Shocking	4yo	H	Street Cry (IRE) - Maria Di Castiglia (GB)
2010-2011	Americain	6yo	G	Dynaformer (USA) – America (IRE)
2011-2012	Dunaden	6yo	G	Nicobar (GB) – La Marlia (FR)
2012-2013	Green Moon	6yo	H	Montjeu (IRE) – Green Noon (FR)
2013-2014	Fiorente	6yo	H	Monsun (GER) – Desert Bloom (IRE)
2014-2015	Protectionist	5yo	H	Monsun (GER) – Patineuse (IRE)
2015-2016	Preferment	5yo	H	Zabeel (NZ) – Better Alternative (AUS)
2016-2017	Jameka	4yo	M	Myboycharlie (IRE) – Mine Game (AUS)
2017-2018	Rekindling	3yo	H	High Chaparral (IRE) – Sitara (GB)
2018-2019	Cross Counter	3yo	H	Teofilo – Waitress
2019-2020	Vow And Declare	4yo	G	Declaration of War - Geblitzt
2020-2021	Verry Elleegant	5yo	M	Zed (NZ)- Opulence (NZ)
2021-2022	Verry Elleegant	6yo	M	Zed (NZ)- Opulence (NZ)
2022-2023	Gold Trip	6yo	C	Outstrip (GB)- Sarvana (FR)
2023-2024	Without A Fight	6yo	G	Teofilo (IRE)- Khor Speed (GB)
2024-2025	Knight's Choice	6yo	G	Extreme Choice - Midnight Pearl

== Other Australian Thoroughbred Awards ==
Australian Champion Racehorse of the Year
Australian Champion Two Year Old
Australian Champion Three Year Old
Australian Champion Sprinter
Australian Champion Middle Distance Racehorse
Australian Champion Filly or Mare
Australian Champion International Performer
Australian Champion Jumper
Australian Champion Trainer
