= Sunline =

New Zealand-bred Thoroughbred racehorse

- Sire: Desert Sun (GB)
- Grandsire: Green Desert (USA)
- Dam: Songline
- Damsire: Western Symphony (USA)
- Sex: Mare
- Foaled: 29 September 1995
- Died: 1 May 2009 (aged 13)
- Country: New Zealand
- Colour: Bay
- Breeder: Susan Archer and Michael Martin
- Owner: Trevor McKee, Thayne Green, Helen Lusty (post racing: Stephen McKee bought Lusty's shares)
- Trainer: Trevor McKee, Stephen McKee
- Record: 48: 32-9-3
- Earnings: NZ$14,200,000

Major wins
- Flight Stakes (1998); W. S. Cox Plate (1999 & 2000); Doncaster Handicap (1999 & 2002); All Aged Stakes (2000 & 2002); Coolmore Classic (2000 & 2002); Waikato Sprint (2001 & 2002); Hong Kong Mile (2000); Manikato Stakes (2000)

Awards
- New Zealand Horse of the Year (1999–2002); Australian Middle Distance Champion (2000, 2001); Australian Horse of the Year (2000, 2001, 2002); Australian Champion Filly or Mare (2000, 2001, 2002); Timeform rating: 129 Timeforms World Champion turf mare of 1999. Timeforms World Champion female mare 2000.

Honours
- Australian Racing Hall of Fame; New Zealand Racing Hall of Fame; Sunline Stakes, Moonee Valley Racecourse; Sunline Vase, Ellerslie Racecourse, Australian Postage Stamp, Sunline Lounge - Moonee Valley Racecourse, Bronze Statue created in her honour at Ellerslie Racecourse,

Sunline (29 September 1995 – 1 May 2009) was a champion New Zealand Thoroughbred racehorse who was the world's highest earning race mare of her time. She won 32 of her 48 races with earnings of NZ$14,200,000. She was named the New Zealand Horse of the Year four times and Australian Horse of the Year three times. She has won the most Group races in modern times with 27, and she previously held the New Zealand record of 13 Group One wins until Melody Belle surpassed her in 2021.

Sunline led in most of her races, and sometimes settled just behind the leader; she was difficult to pass. She loved to win and was known for her fiery temperament.

In 2006, Sunline was an inaugural inductee into the New Zealand Racing Hall of Fame, along with Carbine, Gloaming, Kindergarten, and Phar Lap.

== Background ==
Sunline was foaled at Pleasanton Stud near Cambridge, New Zealand on 29 September 1995. Her sire was the Group Two winning English stallion Desert Sun, a grandson of leading sire Danzig. Her dam was the capable mare Songline by Western Symphony (USA). Sunline came from the same family as Phar Lap, tracing back to the Entreaty through Night Raid (Sunline's 8th dam). She was a big strong plain bay with no white markings.

== Racing career ==
=== Early career ===
In partnership with Thayne Green and Helen Lusty, Trevor McKee raced Sunline as a two-year-old. She was unbeaten in three starts.

After a first-up win at three, in August 1998, the McKees took Sunline to Australia for the first of an eventual nine visits. Racing in the second, third, and fourth legs of Sydney's Princess Series, for three-year-old fillies, she powered through the slop on her Australian debut in the Furious Stakes, won the Tea Rose Stakes on a dry track two weeks later, and then took the Flight Stakes - her first of 13 Group One wins. Sunline was then spelled, rather than continuing on to the feature races in Melbourne, and never competed with the reigning Horse of the Year, Might And Power.

Sunline resumed in February 1999. She won first up but was narrowly beaten for the first time by Rose O'War, second-up, in Melbourne's Angus Armanasco Stakes, her 9th career start. The race was not run to suit, with a long shot racing away before the home turn, which may have exposed Sunline's lack of fitness on the day, as she was jumping from 1,200 to 1,600 metres. At her next start, Sunline defeated Rose O'War in the Kewney Stakes, and in her first look at the Cox Plate course, defeated the VRC Oaks (and subsequent AJC Oaks) winner Grand Archway by 4 1/2 lengths in the Moonee Valley Oaks (2,040 metres).

Sunline then ventured north to Sydney to tackle the Doncaster Handicap (1,600 metres). Despite taking on older horses for the first time, and starting from a wide starting gate, Sunline was sent out one of the shortest-priced favourites in the race's long history, at 10/9 (approximately $2.10). Sunline went straight to the front and never looked back to score by one-and-three-quarter lengths. She became just the fourth filly to win in the modern history of the race.

A fortnight later, Sunline was again a favourite in the Queen Elizabeth Stakes (2,000 metres), and led the field over the rise (near the top of the straight), then faded to finished second-last of the six runners. She was then sent home to New Zealand for a spell.

=== 1999/2000: four-year-old season ===
Unlike many three-year-old champions, Sunline made the transition to weight-for-age racing as four-year-old. First up, she scored a win over the multiple Group One winner Tie the Knot in the Warwick Stakes and was installed ante-post favourite for the $3 million W. S. Cox Plate at Moonee Valley. At her next two starts, Stephen and Trevor McKee then tried to get the mare settle in her races, but she was narrowly defeated in the Theo Marks Quality (by Adam) and the George Main Stakes (by Shogun Lodge). Her final lead-up to the Cox Plate was a close fourth under 56.5 kilograms (8 st 11 lb) in the Epsom Handicap.

Speculation in the media that Sunline would be vulnerable in the Cox Plate - in open company over 2,040 metres - proved unfounded. Leading before the home turn, Sunline held off a late challenge from Tie the Knot, with Caulfield Cup winner Sky Heights in third place. Sunline became only the fifth mare to win the race since its inception in 1922 and the second of four mares to win the race since Dane Ripper in 1997 (the others being Makybe Diva in 2005 and Pinker Pinker in 2011).

After a brief let-up, Sunline came back in distance and defeated other mares in the Auckland Breeders' Stakes (1,400 metres), in New Zealand, in preparation for the International Cup (2,000 metres) in Hong Kong. Sunline led, and her jockey, Greg Childs, explained that she travelled well to the home turn, but, in an echo of the autumn's Queen Elizabeth Stakes, tired badly in the home straight and finished seventh. She then returned home to New Zealand for a spell.

Back in Sydney for the autumn of 2000, Sunline powered through the rain-affected going to win the Apollo Stakes (1,400 metres) first-up. In her entire career, she was never beaten over the distance. She then carried the maximum topweight (60 kilograms) to win the first of two Coolmore Classics - at the time, Australia's only Group One race for fillies and mares (three years and over). At her next start, she carried 57.5 kilograms (9 st. 1 lb.) in the Doncaster Handicap and was narrowly defeated by the lightly weighted three-year-old Over. Meeting again a week later, in the All-Aged Stakes, Sunline relished the return to weight for age conditions - accounting for Georgie Boy, with Over in third place, to make it three wins from four starts this campaign.

=== 2000/2001: five-year-old season ===
Sunline started her five-year-old campaign in Melbourne, against the sprinters - streaking away in the Manikato Stakes (1,200 metres) at Moonee Valley. She then had wins in the Memsie (1,400 metres) and Feehan Stakes (1,600 metres), but was narrowly beaten by Fairway in the Turnbull Stakes (2,000 metres). A natural frontrunner, like Sunline, Fairway refused to hand up the lead to Sunline, who was forced to chase, and held her at bay down the straight. It was Sunline's third defeat over the distance from as many starts away from Moonee Valley, but it was a great improvement on her previous defeats, especially since Fairway was a multiple Group One winning three-year-old the previous season.

Sunline fans regard her next run as one of her greatest. On the last Saturday of October, Sunline took control in the rain-affected going to win the Cox Plate by seven lengths from Caulfield Cup winner Diatribe, with Referral in third place. Perhaps unsuited in the conditions, fancied runners Tie the Knot (2nd in 1999), Sky Heights (3rd in 1999), and Shogun Lodge (conqueror of Sunline in the George Main Stakes) were beaten a combined margin of more than 100 lengths. In winning, Sunline became the first Australasian horse to pass $6 million in career earnings.

=== International success ===
Returning to New Zealand after the Cox Plate, the mare's owners revealed that Sunline had been part of a bidding war from five different countries, including the powerful Godolphin stables in the United Arab Emirates. All bids were rejected, and the mare was prepared for another trip to the rich, pre-Christmas international meeting in Hong Kong. In her final lead-up, Sunline raced away with the Auckland Breeders' Stakes at Pukekohe. In Hong Kong, she led all the way to win the International Mile (1,600 metres), narrowly holding off local icon Fairy King Prawn, with five lengths back to Adam in third place.

While the victory in Hong Kong neither confirmed nor denied the oft-made claim of her fans that Sunline was world's best racemare, her Cox Plate victory saw the Australian and New Zealand Horse of the Year receive an invitation to compete in the world's richest raceday, the Dubai World Cup meeting in the United Arab Emirates.

In early February, Sunline recorded her eighth win in New Zealand when she was too good for seven other Group One winners in the Waikato Sprint. The victory kept alive Sunline's wonderful record in her home country, which at career end would stand at 11 wins from as many starts. Sunline's next step came with a hit-and-run trip to Sydney for the Apollo Stakes at Warwick Farm. For the second year in a row, the race was run on a rain-affected track, and Sunline accounted for Celestial Choir, with Tie the Knot unplaced.

In Dubai, Sunline showed her customary pace to lead the field in the Duty Free (1,800 metres), but her breakaway tactics were not aided by a home straight of 600 metres. Jim And Tonic and Fairy King Prawn loomed up to Sunline with 200 metres to run, and after a tough run, Sunline did well to hold on for third.

She returned to Australia to contest the All Aged Stakes against a sub-standard field on a wet track at Randwick. Starting a hot favourite, Sunline was narrowly defeated by El Mirada and Final Fantasy, and then given time off from racing.

=== 2001/2002: six-year-old season ===
The six year old Sunline returned with a close second to Piavonic in the Manikato Stakes. She then won the Memsie Stakes for the second year in a row, but was defeated by Northerly in the Feehan Stakes. She rebounded to win the Turnbull Stakes in her fourth start of the season.

Sunline was defeated by Northerly again in the Cox Plate, where a third victory would have equalled the record set by Kingston Town. Just like in the Feehan Stakes, in both races, Sunline led to the home turn, but Northerly surged to the front in the straight. The race featured three controversial protests: Sunline (second) against first (Northerly), and third (Viscount) against first and second. The protests arose from heavy contact between the three horses in the straight, with Northerly on the outside, Sunline closest to the rails, and Viscount in between. All three protests were eventually dismissed on twin grounds that stewards were unable to determine which riders were at fault or satisfy themselves that the interference had affected the result.

Following her spring defeats by Northerly, Sunline returned in the autumn of 2002 to race four times for as many wins - all in Group One races. Each of her nine starts for the season came in races she had also contested in the last two seasons, and returned six wins from nine starts (a winning strike-rate of 67%), compared to eight from 11 in the 2000–2001 season (73%), and six from 11 in the 1999–2000 season (55%).

The first of these was a win by four lengths in Waikato Sprint at Te Rapa (defeating Ethereal, who was out-paced in her first run since the Melbourne Cup). She then won the Coolmore Classic for a second time - again carrying the race's maximum handicap of 60 kilograms - and became the first horse in Australasia to win A$9 million in prize money.

At her next start, she carried the number one saddlecloth to victory in Doncaster Handicap. With 58 kilos, she defeated Shogun Lodge (who also carried 58 kilos) and Defier (who carried 51.5 kilos but was trapped wide). She closed her campaign with a six-length victory in the weight-for age All-Aged Stakes. By winning these races, she became the first horse in Australasia to pass the $11 million mark in career earnings and with 13 Group One wins, she was within one of Kingston Town's record of 14 Group One races.

In the next spring, Sunline notched her fifth consecutive win when taking the Mudgway Stakes first-up in New Zealand, and returned to Sydney for the George Main Stakes. Sunline led but was run down by Defier and Excellerator. In her next start in the Caulfield Guineas Sunline led, and, to a huge roar from the crowd, skipped away by more than three lengths at the top of the straight, but Lonhro loomed up strongly close to home to score in race record time, with a margin of six lengths back to the third horse.

The clash may have flattened Sunline and Lonhro, who appeared to race below their best when fourth and sixth, respectively, behind Northerly in the Cox Plate. As planned, Sunline was retired after this, her fourth and final Cox Plate, and her record of two wins, a second, and a fourth is one of the best in the history of the race.

==== Retirement and records ====
She retired with 27 stakes wins, more than any other horse in Australasian history, and was the highest grossing Australasian racehorse at that time. She was Australian Horse of the Year a record 3 times, and inducted into Australian Racing Hall of Fame – the only horse to receive that honour while still racing. She was New Zealand Horse of the Year 4 times, and inducted into the New Zealand Racing Hall of Fame.

== Race record ==
1997–98 season as a two-year-old
Result	Date	Race	Venue	Group	Distance	Weight (kg)	Jockey	Winner/2nd
Won	10 May 1998	2yo Hcp Restricted	Paeroa	NA	1100 m	55	P. Johnson	2nd - Speed To Burn
Won	30 May 1998	2yo Hcp Restricted	Ellerslie	NA	1200 m	54	P. Johnson	2nd - Light Opera
Won	9 July 1998	Breeders Stakes	Ruakaka	LR	1200 m	56.5	P. Johnson	2nd - Life of Riley

1998–99 season as a three-year-old
Result	Date	Race	Venue	Group	Distance	Weight (kg)	Jockey	Winner/2nd
Won	22 August 1998	3yo Hcp Restricted	Hastings	NA	1200 m	55	P. Johnson	2nd - No Alimony
Won	5 September 1998	Furious Stakes	Randwick	G3	1400 m	54	L. Cassidy	2nd - Zaroyale
Won	19 September 1998	Tea Rose Stakes	Rosehill	G2	1500 m	55.5	L. Cassidy	2nd - Zola
Won	3 October 1998	Flight Stakes	Randwick	G1	1600 m	54	L. Cassidy	2nd - Camerena
Won	1 February 1999	3yo Hcp Restricted	Ellerslie	NA	1200 m	62.5	L. Cassidy	2nd - Delphic
2nd	20 February 1999	Angus Armanasco Stakes	Caulfield	G3	1600 m	55.5	L. Cassidy	1st - Rose O'War
Won	6 March 1999	AV Kewney Stakes	Flemington	G2	1600 m	55.5	G. Childs	2nd - Rose O'War
Won	20 March 1999	Moonee Valley Oaks	Moonee Valley	G3	2040 m	55.5	G. Childs	2nd - Grand Archway
Won	3 April 1999	Doncaster	Randwick	G1	1600 m	52	L. Cassidy	2nd - Lease
5th	17 April 1999	Queen Elizabeth Stakes	Randwick	G1	2000 m	52	L. Cassidy	2nd - Intergaze

1999–2000 season as a four-year-old
Result	Date	Race	Venue	Group	Distance	Weight (kg)	Jockey	Winner/2nd
Won	21 August 1999	Warwick Stakes	Warwick Farm	G2	1400 m	55	L. Cassidy	2nd - Tie The Knot
2nd	11 September 1999	Theo Marks Stakes	Rosehill	G2	1300 m	58	L. Cassidy	1st - Adam
2nd	25 September 1999	George Main Stakes	Randwick	G1	1600 m	55	L. Cassidy	1st - Shogun Lodge
4th	2 October 1999	Epsom Handicap	Randwick	G1	1600 m	56.5	L. Cassidy	1st - Allez Suez
Won	23 October 1999	Cox Plate	Moonee Valley	G1	2040 m	54	G. Childs	2nd - Tie The Knot
Won	20 November 1999	Breeders Stakes	Pukekohe	G2	1400 m	54.5	G. Childs	2nd - Soap Opera
7th	12 December 1999	Hong Kong Cup	Sha Tin	G1	2000 m	56	G. Childs	1st - Jim And Tonic
Won	11 March 2000	Apollo Stakes	Warwick Farm	G2	1400 m	55.5	G. Childs	2nd - Adam
Won	1 April 2000	Coolmore Classic	Rosehill	G1	1500 m	60	G. Childs	2nd - Beat The Fade
2nd	22 April 2000	Doncaster	Randwick	G1	1600 m	57.5	G. Childs	1st - Over
Won	29 April 2000	All Aged Stakes	Randwick	G1	1600 m	55.5	G. Childs	2nd - Georgie Boy

2000–01 season as a five-year-old
Result	Date	Race	Venue	Group	Distance	Weight (kg)	Jockey	Winner/2nd
Won	19 August 2000	Manikato Stakes	Moonee Valley	G1	1200 m	55	G. Childs	2nd - Honour The Name
Won	3 September 2000	Memsie Stakes	Caulfield	G2	1400 m	55.5	G. Childs	2nd - Umrum
Won	16 September 2000	J F Feehan Stakes	Moonee Valley	G2	1600 m	55.5	G. Childs	2nd - Le Zagaletta
2nd	7 October 2000	Turnbull Stakes	Flemington	G2	2000 m	56.5	G. Childs	1st - Fairway
Won	28 October 2000	Cox Plate	Moonee Valley	G1	2040 m	55.5	G. Childs	2nd - Diatribe
Won	25 November 2000	Breeders Stakes	Pukekohe	G2	1400 m	55.5	G. Childs	2nd - Amnesia
Won	17 December 2000	Hong Kong Mile	Sha Tin	G1	1600 m	56	G. Childs	2nd - Fairy King Prawn
Won	10 February 2001	Waikato Sprint	Te Rapa	G1	1400 m	56	G. Childs	2nd - Fritz
Won	3 March 2001	Apollo Stakes	Warwick Farm	G2	1400 m	55.5	G. Childs	2nd - Celestial Choir
3rd	24 March 2001	Dubai Duty Free Stakes	Nad Al Sheba	G2	1777 m	55	G. Childs	1st - Jim And Tonic
3rd	21 April 2001	All Aged Stakes	Randwick	G1	1600 m	55.5	G. Childs	1st - El Mirada

2001–02 season as a six-year-old
Result	Date	Race	Venue	Group	Distance	Weight (kg)	Jockey	Winner/2nd
2nd	18 August 2001	Manikato Stakes	Moonee Valley	G1	1200 m	55	G. Childs	1st - Piavonic
Won	1 September 2001	Memsie Stakes	Caulfield	G2	1400 m	55.5	G. Childs	2nd - Piavonic
2nd	15 September 2001	J F Feehan Stakes	Moonee Valley	G2	1600 m	55.5	G. Childs	1st - Northerly
Won	6 October 2001	Turnbull Stakes	Flemington	G2	2000 m	56.5	G. Childs	2nd - Universal Prince
2nd	27 October 2001	Cox Plate	Moonee Valley	G1	2040 m	55.5	G. Childs	1st - Northerly
Won	9 February 2002	Waikato Sprint	Te Rapa	G1	1400 m	56	G. Childs	2nd - Honor Bound
Won	9 March 2002	Coolmore Classic	Rosehill	G1	1500 m	60	G. Childs	2nd - Gentle Genius
Won	30 March 2002	Doncaster	Randwick	G1	1600 m	58	G. Childs	2nd - Shogun Lodge
Won	6 April 2002	All Aged Stakes	Randwick	G1	1600 m	55.5	G. Childs	2nd - Cent Home

2002–03 season as a seven-year-old
Result	Date	Race	Venue	Group	Distance	Weight (kg)	Jockey	Winner/2nd
Won	24 August 2002	Mudgway Stakes	Hastings	G2	1400 m	56	G. Childs	2nd - Tit For Taat
3rd	28 September 2002	George Main Stakes	Randwick	G1	1600 m	55.5	G. Childs	1st - Defier
2nd	12 October 2002	Caulfield Stakes	Caulfield	G1	2000 m	55.5	G. Childs	1st - Lonhro
4th	24 October 2002	Cox Plate	Moonee Valley	G1	2040 m	55.5	G. Childs	1st - Northerly

== Stud record ==
Sunline went into retirement at the McKee property near Auckland and produced four foals. Two of her progeny won races, Sunstrike (2004 filly, by Rock of Gibraltar) and Sun Ruler (2005 colt, by Zabeel). Sun Ruler and Sunstrike were both trained by Stephen McKee and met in a race on 19 December 2009 at Te Rapa with Sun Ruler defeating his older half-sister, Sunstrike, by a nose.

Sun Ruler stood at stud in New Zealand from 2012 until 2017 and died 12 February 2022.

Sunline also left the unraced Sunalta (2006 filly, by Rock of Gibraltar) and the unplaced Sunsett (2007 filly, by Hussonet).

In 2011, Sunline became a grandmother for the first time, when her 3rd foal and 2nd daughter, Sunalta, produced a bay filly by the Danzig stallion, Librettist. In 2012, Sunalta foaled a chestnut filly by the Zafonic stallion, Iffraaj (GB) and Sunstrike foaled a bay colt by the Street Cry stallion, Per Incanto (USA).

== Pedigree ==
Pedigree of Sunline (NZ)
Sire Desert Sun (GB) 1988	Green Desert (USA); 1983	Danzig (USA); 1977	Northern Dancer (CAN)
Sire Desert Sun (GB) 1988	Green Desert (USA); 1983	Danzig (USA); 1977	Pas de Nom (USA)
Sire Desert Sun (GB) 1988	Green Desert (USA); 1983	Foreign Courier (USA); 1979	Sir Ivor (USA)
Sire Desert Sun (GB) 1988	Green Desert (USA); 1983	Foreign Courier (USA); 1979	Courtly Dee (USA)
Sire Desert Sun (GB) 1988	Solar (GB); 1973	Hotfoot (GB); 1966	Firestreak (GB)
Sire Desert Sun (GB) 1988	Solar (GB); 1973	Hotfoot (GB); 1966	Pitter Patter (GB)
Sire Desert Sun (GB) 1988	Solar (GB); 1973	Languissola (GB); 1967	Soderini (GB)
Sire Desert Sun (GB) 1988	Solar (GB); 1973	Languissola (GB); 1967	Posh (GB)
Dam Songline (NZ) 1987	Western Symphony (USA); 1981	Nijinsky (CAN); 1967	Northern Dancer (CAN)
Dam Songline (NZ) 1987	Western Symphony (USA); 1981	Nijinsky (CAN); 1967	Flaming Page (CAN)
Dam Songline (NZ) 1987	Western Symphony (USA); 1981	Millcent (USA); 1969	Cornish Prince (USA)
Dam Songline (NZ) 1987	Western Symphony (USA); 1981	Millcent (USA); 1969	Milan Mill (USA)
Dam Songline (NZ) 1987	McAngus (NZ); 1979	Alvaro (GB); 1965	Rockefella (GB)
Dam Songline (NZ) 1987	McAngus (NZ); 1979	Alvaro (GB); 1965	Aldegonde (FR)
Dam Songline (NZ) 1987	McAngus (NZ); 1979	Honey Carlyle (NZ); 1967	Better Honey (GB)
Dam Songline (NZ) 1987	McAngus (NZ); 1979	Honey Carlyle (NZ); 1967	Nora Crena (NZ) (Family: 2-r)

- Sunline is inbred 4S x 4D to the stallion Northern Dancer, meaning that he appears in the fourth generation on the sire side and fourth generation on the dam side of her pedigree.

== Death ==
On 1 May 2009 Sunline was put down after suffering from the debilitating hoof disease laminitis for nine months. A memorial has been established at Ellerslie Racecourse where she is buried.

== See also ==
- Thoroughbred racing in New Zealand
- List of leading Thoroughbred racehorses
- List of racehorses
