= Glen Boss =

Australian jockey

Personal information
- Born: 21 August 1969 (age 57) Caboolture, Queensland, Australia

Horse racing career
- Sport: Horse racing

Major racing wins
- Chipping Norton Stakes (1994, 2004); Golden Slipper (1995, 2008); Flight Stakes (1995); The Metropolitan (1995, 2003); Doncaster Handicap (1996, 2004, 2006, 2007, 2008, 2015, 2019); Champagne Stakes (ATC) (1996); George Main Stakes (1996, 2006); VRC Oaks (1996); Australian Oaks (1997, 2002, 2006, 2020); Rosehill Guineas (1999); Australian Derby (1999, 2004, 2011); Ranvet Stakes (1999, 2003, 2006, 2010); Queensland Derby (1999, 2005); Doomben Cup (2000); Epsom Handicap (2000, 2006, 2010, 2019); Caulfield Stakes (2000, 2012); VRC Derby (2000); Queen Elizabeth Stakes (ATC) (2001, 2006); Toorak Handicap (2001, 2002, 2005); The Galaxy (ATC) (2002); Lightning Stakes (2003, 2005); Brisbane Cup (2003); Stradbroke Handicap (2003); LKS Mackinnon Stakes (2003); Melbourne Cup (2003, 2004, 2005); Sydney Cup (2004, 2020); Sires' Produce Stakes (ATC) (2004); All Aged Stakes (2004, 2011); QTC Sires Produce Stakes (2004); Myer Classic (2004); Australian Cup (2005); Randwick Guineas (2005); Vinery Stud Stakes (2005); Tancred Stakes (2005, 2006, 2021); Caulfield Guineas (2005); Manikato Stakes (2005); Oakleigh Plate (2005); Cox Plate (2005, 2009, 2012, 2020); George Ryder Stakes (2006, 2007, 2021); Queen of the Turf Stakes (2007); Coolmore Classic (2009, 2011); Sir Rupert Clarke Stakes (2009, 2013); The Thousand Guineas (2009); William Reid Stakes (2010, 2015); Australian Guineas (2011); Underwood Stakes (2012, 2014); Newmarket Handicap (2020); VRC Sprint Classic (2020)

Honours
- Australian Racing Hall of Fame

Significant horses
- Makybe Diva; So You Think; Starcraft; Ocean Park; Eremein; Haradasun; Fastnet Rock; Divine Madonna; Shogun Lodge

Glen Boss (born 21 August 1969) is an Australian jockey, who is best known for riding Makybe Diva to victory in three consecutive Melbourne Cups: 2003, 2004, and 2005. He has also been successful in four Cox Plates: Makybe Diva in 2005, So You Think in 2009, Ocean Park in 2012, and Sir Dragonet in 2020.

At the end of May 2021 he had ridden 1,893 wins, including 90 Group One wins, for total prize money of A$180 million.
