= Teofilo (disambiguation) =

Teófilo is a masculine given name. It may also refer to:

- Teofilo (horse), Irish racehorse
- Teofilo Kisanji University, private university in Mbeya, Tanzania
- Teófilo Otoni, city in northeast Minas Gerais state, Brazil
- Rodolfo Teófilo, Fortaleza, neighborhood in Fortaleza, Ceará, Brazil
- Roman Catholic Diocese of Teófilo Otoni
- Stadio Teofilo Patini, stadium located in Castel di Sangro, Italy
