= 2003 Melbourne Cup =

Australian horse race

- Melbourne Cup
- Location: Flemington Racecourse; Melbourne, Australia
- Date: 4 November 2003
- Winning horse: Makybe Diva
- Jockey: Glen Boss
- Trainer: David Hall
- Surface: Grass
- Attendance: 122,736

Zagalia at the 300, Frightening with Makybe Diva going for a run she's finishing hard and wider out now Pentastic is joining in and She's Archie runs on but Makybe Diva shot away! She's out by two lengths to She's Archie, Pentastic and Zagalia. Makybe Diva in front, She's Archie tries hard but Makybe Diva wins the Cup!

— Commentator Greg Miles describes the climax of the race

The 2003 Melbourne Cup was the 143rd running of the Melbourne Cup, a prestigious Australian Thoroughbred horse race. The race, run over 3,200 metres (1.988 mi), was held on 4 November 2003 at Melbourne's Flemington Racecourse.

It was won by Makybe Diva at the age of five, trained by David Hall and ridden by Glen Boss.

The 2003 race featured the first appearance by an Australian female jockey in the Melbourne Cup with Clare Lindop finishing 19th on Debben for Leon Macdonald. Maree Lyndon from New Zealand was the first female jockey in the Melbourne Cup, when she rode Argonaut Style in 1987.

== Field ==
This is a list of horses which ran in the 2003 Melbourne Cup.

Placing	Number	Horse	Trainer	Jockey	Weight (Kg)	Barrier
1st	12	Makybe Diva (GB)	David Hall	Glen Boss	51	14
2nd	17	She's Archie	Darren Weir	Scott Seamer	50	9
3rd	1	Jardines Lookout (IRE)	Alan Jarvis	Daryll Holland	55.5	11
4th	5	Pentastic	David Hall	Steven Arnold	53.5	1
5th	18	Zagalia (NZ)	Clarry Connors	Chris Munce	50	23
6th	11	Grey Song	Tommy Hughes Snr.	Steven King	51	19
7th	9	Distinctly Secret (NZ)	Mark Walker (NZ)	Kerrin McEvoy	52.5	18
8th	24	Yakama	Bevan Laming	Michael Rodd	49	2
9th	10	Hugs Dancer (FR)	James Given (GB)	Dean McKeown	52	13
10th	20	Big Pat	Robbie Griffiths	Peter Mertens	49.5	17
11th	15	Frightening	Bart Cummings	Shane Dye	50	4
12th	8	Mr Prudent	George Hanlon	Damien Oliver	53	7
13th	19	Ain't Seen Nothin'	Barbara Joseph	Craig Newitt	49.5	15
14th	14	Tumeric	Lee Freedman	Brett Prebble	51	16
15th	6	County Tyrone	Kris Lees	Jim Cassidy	53	12
16th	21	Bold Bard	Bryce Stanaway	Reece Wheeler	50	6
17th	7	Holy Orders (IRE)	Willie Mullins (IRE)	David Condon	53	20
18th	23	Fawaz	Graeme Rogerson (NZ)	Stephen Baster	49	3
19th	22	Debben	Leon MacDonald	Clare Lindop	49	5
20th	13	Piachay (NZ)	David Hall	Matt Pumpa	51	21
21st	4	Millstreet (GB)	Saeed bin Suroor (UAE)	Patrick Payne	54.5	22
22nd	16	Schumpeter	Peter Moody	Corey Brown	50.5	8
23rd	2	Mamool (IRE)	Saeed bin Suroor (UAE)	Frankie Dettori	55.5	10
SCR	~~3~~	~~Mummify~~	~~Lee Freedman~~	—	—	—
