= Tugela (disambiguation) =

Tugela is a river in KwaZulu-Natal Province, South Africa

Tugela may also refer to:

- Tugela (horse), a racehorse
- Tugela, KwaZulu-Natal, a town in South Africa
- Lamoria or Tugela, a snout moth genus

== See also ==
- Geely Tugella, a compact crossover SUV
