= Mahogany (horse) =

Australian-bred Thoroughbred racehorse

- Racing silks of Mahogany
- Sire: Last Tycoon
- Grandsire: Try My Best
- Dam: Alshandegha
- Damsire: Alydar
- Sex: Gelding
- Foaled: 1 October 1990
- Died: 20 November 2021 (aged 31)
- Country: Australia
- Colour: Brown
- Breeder: Akron Breeding & Racing Venture (AUS)
- Owner: LJ Willams, SJ Williams, KFB Packer, RR Packer
- Trainer: Lee Freedman
- Record: 43: 19-7-5
- Earnings: A$3,670,978

Major wins
- Sires' Produce Stakes (1993); Castlemaine Stakes (1993); Caulfield Guineas (1993); VRC Derby (1993); Australian Guineas (1994); AJC Derby (1994); Lightning Stakes (1995, 1997)

Awards
- Australian Champion Three Year Old (1993/94); Australian Horse of the Year(1993/94)

Honours
- Australian Racing Hall of Fame (2025)
- Last updated on 1 February 2026

Mahogany (1 October 1990 – 20 November 2021) (Last Tycoon from Alshandegha) was an Australian thoroughbred who raced in the mid-1990s. He was aimed at the three-year-old staying events, where he won the Victoria Derby and the Australian Derby. As an older horse he usually was restricted to sprint races.

The notable exception was the 1995 W.S. Cox Plate where he ran a photo-finish second to Octagonal.

Mahogany won 8 Group One events and won A$3,670,977. He was owned by businessmen Kerry Packer and Lloyd Williams and trained by Lee Freedman.

Mahogany was awarded Australian Horse of the Year for the 1993-1994 racing season and is a member of the Australian Racing Hall of Fame.

The Mahogany Room at Crown Casino was named after him.

== See also ==
Thoroughbred racing in Australia
