= Typhoon Tracy =

Australian-bred Thoroughbred racehorse

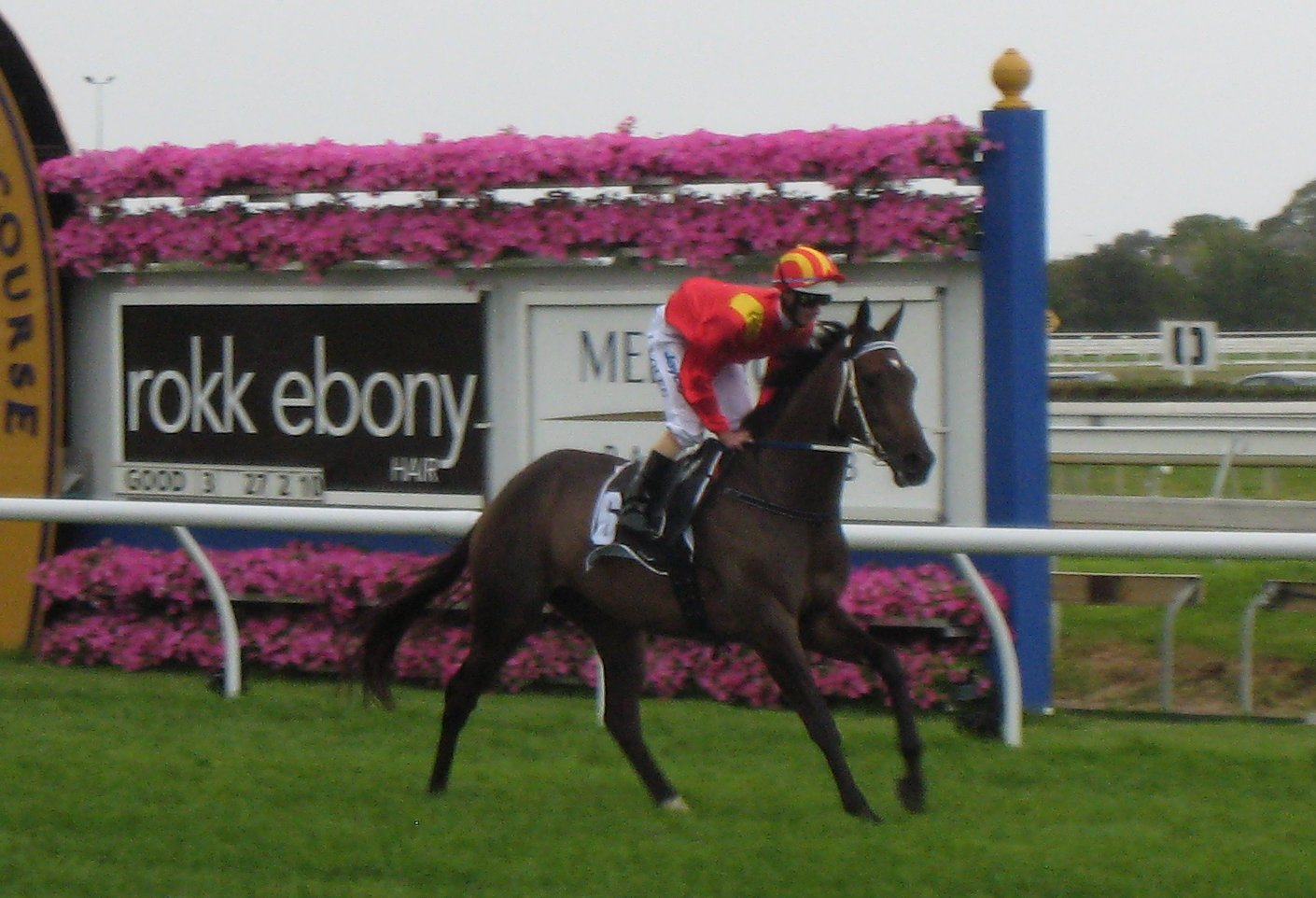
- Typhoon Tracy prior to the start of the Futurity Stakes
- Sire: Red Ransom (USA)
- Grandsire: Roberto
- Dam: Tracy's Element (AUS)
- Damsire: Last Tycoon (IRE)
- Sex: Mare
- Foaled: 2005
- Died: 12 August 2012
- Country: Australia
- Colour: Bay or brown
- Breeder: Hutchins Thoroughbreds, Queensland
- Owner: Hutchins Thoroughbreds Syndicate (Mgrs: J T & F M Hutchins)
- Trainer: Peter Moody
- Record: 16:10-1-1
- Earnings: A$1,995,100

Major wins
- Coolmore Classic (2009); Myer Classic (2009); C F Orr Stakes (2010, 2011); Futurity Stakes (2010); Queen Of The Turf Stakes (2010)

Awards
- Australian Racehorse of the Year (2010); Australian Champion Middle Distance Racehorse (2010)

Honours
- Typhoon Tracy Stakes
- Last updated on 4 September 2010

Typhoon Tracy (5 September 2005 – 13 August 2012) was an outstanding Australian Thoroughbred racemare who won six group one (G1) races and was crowned Australian Racehorse of the Year for 2009/10.

== Breeding ==
She was bred and is raced by Hutchins Thoroughbreds of Queensland and is by the good sire, Red Ransom (USA) her dam is the 2010 TBQA Broodmare of the Year, Tracy's Element who won four G1 races and a G2 race in South Africa. Tracy's Element was by the international sire, Last Tycoon (IRE) and foaled in Australia. She raced in South Africa, before she was brought back to Australia via the United States. Typhoon Tracy is a sister to listed races winner, Red Element (2004), who is now standing at Glenlogan Park stud.

Typhoon Tracy's name has come from Cyclone Tracy and names found in her pedigree.

== Racing record ==
In her first season of racing as a three-year-old in 2008/09, Typhoon Tracy won all of her five starts, ending with her first Group One win in the Coolmore Classic at Rosehill. Returning as a four-year-old against male horses, she was placed in the J.J. Liston Stakes and Makybe Diva Stakes before an 8th placing in the Underwood Stakes over 1800m. Dropped back in distance and to mares races, she won her final two races in the spring, including another Group One in the Myer Classic at Flemington. Her autumn 2010 campaign started with three successive Group One wins: the C.F. Orr Stakes, Futurity Stakes and the Queen Of The Turf Stakes, before failing in the Doncaster Mile. Those achievements saw her awarded the Australian Horse of the Year title. She has run twice as a five-year-old, with a fourth placing in the Memsie Stakes and a second placing in the Dato Tan Chin Nam Stakes.

Typhoon Tracy was named the 2010 Sky Racing World Australian Racehorse of the Year at Melbourne’s Crown Palladium. Following her second win of the C F Orr Stakes in February 2011, trainer Peter Moody announced that Typhoon Tracy will be retired.`

On 13 August 2012 Vinery Stud confirmed that Typhoon Tracy died shortly after delivering her first foal. Her foal, from the sire Street Cry, showed no ill effects before its mother's death.
