= Papineau (horse) =

British-bred Thoroughbred racehorse (2000–2024)

- Sire: Singspiel
- Grandsire: In the Wings
- Dam: Early Rising
- Damsire: Grey Dawn
- Sex: Gelded male
- Foaled: 6 April 2000
- Died: 4 February 2024 (aged 23)
- Country: United Kingdom
- Colour: Chestnut
- Breeder: Executors of the late Peter Winfield
- Owner: Sheikh Mohammed; Godolphin Racing
- Trainer: André Fabre; Saeed bin Suroor
- Record: 9: 5–1–0
- Earnings: £263,421

Major wins
- Prix de l'Avre (2003); Henry II Stakes (2004); Ascot Gold Cup (2004)

Papineau (6 April 2000 – 4 February 2024) was a British-bred Thoroughbred racehorse. Unraced as a juvenile, he showed promise as a three-year-old in France, winning two races including the Prix de l'Avre. As a four-year-old, he was campaigned in England and was unbeaten in three starts. After winning a minor race on his seasonal debut he won a strongly-contested edition of the Henry II Stakes and then recorded his biggest success in the Ascot Gold Cup. He made two appearances as a five-year-old but failed to recover his best form.

== Background ==
Papineau was a chestnut horse with a white blaze and three white socks bred in the United Kingdom. He was foaled after the death of his breeder Peter Winfield. Papineau's dam Early Rising was bought for $160,000 by Tony Lakin on behalf of Winfield at Keeneland in November 1988. She was a very successful broodmare producing several other winners including Silver Patriarch, who won the St Leger in 1997 and the Coronation Cup in 1998.

Papineau was sired by Singspiel an exceptional international campaigner whose wins included the Canadian International Stakes, Japan Cup, Dubai World Cup, Coronation Cup and International Stakes. The best of his other progeny have included Moon Ballad, Solow and Dar Re Mi.

The colt was acquired by Sheikh Mohammed's Godolphin system and sent into training with André Fabre before being switched to Saeed bin Suroor.

== Racing career ==
=== 2003: three-year-old season ===
On his racecourse debut, Papineau started as the favourite for the Prix Aveu over 2400 metres at Saint-Cloud Racecourse on 2 April. Ridden by Christophe Soumillon he led for most of the way before being caught in the final strides and beaten a short head by Touch of Land, a colt who went on to win two editions of the Prix Dollar. At the end of the month over the same course and distance he recorded his first success, beating Well Dressed by one and a half lengths. In May, he was moved up in class for the Listed Prix de l'Avre at Longchamp Racecourse and started as the 1/5 favourite against four opponents. Ridden by Soumillon, he raced in third place before taking the lead 100 metres out and won by a neck from Affirmative Action. On 1 June, Papineau started as the 8/1 third favourite for the Group One Prix du Jockey Club at Chantilly Racecourse in which he was ridden by Frankie Dettori. After taking the lead in the straight he weakened in the closing stages and finished fifth of the seven runners behind Dalakhani. After the race, Dettori said "He was the first beaten and the ground was too fast for this colt".

At the end of the year, Papineau was transferred to Sheikh Mohammed's Godolphin Racing team and was trained by André Fabre and then by Saeed bin Suroor. He was a gelding.

=== 2004: four-year-old season ===
Papineau made his British debut in a minor takes race over one and a half miles at Goodwood Racecourse on 19 May in which he was ridden by the Australian Kerrin McEvoy. Starting at 8/1 in a fourteen-runner field he overtook his stablemate Songlark inside the final furlong and went clear to win by two and a half lengths. Twelve days later, Papineau was stepped up in class and distance to contest the Group Three Henry II Stakes over two miles at Sandown Park Racecourse. He started as the 9/4 second favourite against eight opponents, including the Ascot Gold Cup winners Mr Dinos and Royal Rebel, as well as the Sagaro Stakes winner Risk Seeker, and Misternando, winner of ten races in 2003. Ridden by Dettori, he tracked the leaders before taking the lead approaching the final furlong, and won by one and a half lengths from Mr Dinos, with New South Wales in third. Papineau was carrying 124 pounds, whilst Mr Dinos carried 131.

On 17 June, Papineau, again ridden by Dettori, started as the 5/1 second favourite for the 196th running of the Gold Cup over two and a half miles at Ascot Racecourse. Mr Dinos (the 5/4 favourite), Royal Rebel, New South Wales and Misternando were again in opposition along with Brian Boru, Westerner, Ingrandire (Tenno Sho), Darasim (Prix Kergorlay) and Alcazar (Sagaro Stakes). After being restrained towards the rear of the field in the early stages, Papineau began to make progress in the last half mile. He overtook Westerner a furlong out and stayed on to defeat the French challenger by one and a half lengths, with Darasim taking third ahead of Royal Rebel. Dettori celebrated with a flying dismount and said "This horse is top class – he can win a Group 1 over a mile and a half. I had faith in my horse's turn of foot, and if he could take me to the furlong marker, I knew I would outsprint anyone in the last furlong." The connections of the beaten horses were less charitable: Westerner's owner commented "the dope testing machine must be broken", whilst Mark Johnston, trainer of the third and fourth placed horses, objected to the use of ear plugs on the runner-up. The Godolphin team indicated that the horse would be brought back in distance to contest races such as the King George VI and Queen Elizabeth Stakes and the Prix de l'Arc de Triomphe but Papineau did not race again in 2004.

=== 2005: five-year-old season ===
After an absence of almost eleven months, Papineau returned for the Yorkshire Cup on 13 May 2005. He started as the 7/2 second favourite but finished fifth to Franklins Gardens after hanging to the right in the closing stages. The "Royal Ascot" meeting of 2005 took place at York Racecourse as Ascot Racecourse was being redeveloped. Papineau was made the third favourite for the Gold Cup, but never looked likely to win and was virtually pulled-up by McEvoy in the straight and finished sixteenth of the seventeen runners behind Westerner.

== Retirement and death ==
After Papineau's retirement from racing, he was re-trained to compete in horse shows and dressage events. He also worked as a therapy horse that provided equine-assisted therapy through visits to hospitals and hospices such as Newmarket Hospital and East Anglia's Children's Hospices. He was a finalist for the inaugural Sir Peter O’Sullevan Charitable Trust Retraining of Racehorses Community Impact Award, and his achievements were celebrated at the Retraining of Racehorses Awards on 31 January 2024.

Papineau was euthanised on 4 February 2024, at the age of 23. He had recently been diagnosed with heart issues.

== Assessment ==
In the 2004 World Thoroughbred Racehorse Rankings, Papineau was given a rating of 119, making him the 34th best racehorse in the world.

== Pedigree ==
Pedigree of Papineau chestnut gelding, 2000
Sire Singspiel (IRE) 1992	In the Wings (GB); 1986	Sadler's Wells	Northern Dancer
Sire Singspiel (IRE) 1992	In the Wings (GB); 1986	Sadler's Wells	Fairy Bridge
Sire Singspiel (IRE) 1992	In the Wings (GB); 1986	High Hawk	Shirley Heights
Sire Singspiel (IRE) 1992	In the Wings (GB); 1986	High Hawk	Sunbittern
Sire Singspiel (IRE) 1992	Glorious Song (CAN); 1976	Halo	Hail To Reason
Sire Singspiel (IRE) 1992	Glorious Song (CAN); 1976	Halo	Cosmah
Sire Singspiel (IRE) 1992	Glorious Song (CAN); 1976	Ballade	Herbager
Sire Singspiel (IRE) 1992	Glorious Song (CAN); 1976	Ballade	Miss Swapsco
Dam Early Rising (USA) 1980	Grey Dawn (FR); 1962	Herbager	Vandale
Dam Early Rising (USA) 1980	Grey Dawn (FR); 1962	Herbager	Flagette
Dam Early Rising (USA) 1980	Grey Dawn (FR); 1962	Polamia	Mahmoud
Dam Early Rising (USA) 1980	Grey Dawn (FR); 1962	Polamia	Ampola
Dam Early Rising (USA) 1980	Gliding By (USA); 1975	Tom Rolfe	Ribot
Dam Early Rising (USA) 1980	Gliding By (USA); 1975	Tom Rolfe	Pocahontas
Dam Early Rising (USA) 1980	Gliding By (USA); 1975	Key Bridge	Princequillo
Dam Early Rising (USA) 1980	Gliding By (USA); 1975	Key Bridge	Blue Banner (Family: 2-n)

- Papineau was inbred 3 × 4 to Herbager, meaning that this stallion appears in both the third and the fourth generations of his pedigree.
