= Scenic Blast =

Australian-bred Thoroughbred racehorse

- Sire: Scenic
- Grandsire: Sadler's Wells
- Dam: Daughters Charm
- Damsire: Delgado
- Sex: Gelding
- Foaled: 2004
- Country: Australia
- Colour: Bay / brown
- Breeder: Durham Lodge Thoroughbred Stud
- Owner: Elio Galante & Partners
- Trainer: Daniel Morton (Australia); John Shirreffs (United States)
- Record: 31:8-8-4
- Earnings: A$2,122,046

Major wins
- Lightning Stakes(2009); Newmarket Handicap (2009); King's Stand Stakes (2009)

Awards
- Australian Champion Racehorse of the Year (2008-2009); Australian Champion Sprinter (2008-2009)
- Last updated on 24 December 2024

Scenic Blast (foaled 2004) is a Thoroughbred racehorse trained in Australia. His first group win was in the HDF McNeil Stakes. In 2009, he won three group one races, the Lightning Stakes, Newmarket Handicap and the King's Stand Stakes. He was the Australian Horse Of The Year in 2009.
