= Australian Champion Middle Distance Racehorse =

The Australian Champion Middle Distance Racehorse is awarded annually to the horse whose performances in Australia over distances between 1,401 m and 2,199 m are deemed to be the superior to its rivals. It has been awarded since the 1999 - 2000 season.

Australian Champion Middle Distance Racehorse
| Year / Season | Horse | Age/Sex | Breeding |
|---|---|---|---|
| 2023-2024 | Pride Of Jenni | 6yoM | Pride of Dubai-Sancerre |
| 2022-2023 | Anamoe | 4yoC | Street Boss-Anamato |
| 2021-2022 | Zaaki | 7yoG | Leroidesanimaux-Kesara |
| 2020-2021 | Verry Elleegant | 5yoM | Zed-Opulence |
| 2019-2020 (tied) | Fierce Impact | 6yoC | Deep Impact-Keiai Gerbera |
| 2019-2020 (tied) | Regal Power | 4yoG | Pierro-Broadway Belle |
| 2018-2019 | Winx | 7yoM | Street Cry - Vegas Showgirl |
| 2017-2018 | Winx | 6yoM | Street Cry - Vegas Showgirl |
| 2016-2017 | Winx | 5yoM | Street Cry - Vegas Showgirl |
| 2015-2016 | Winx | 4yoM | Street Cry - Vegas Showgirl |
| 2011-2012 | More Joyous | 6yoM | More Than Ready - Sunday Joy |
| 2010-2011 | So You Think | 4yoC | High Chaparral - Triassic |
| 2009-2010 | Typhoon Tracy | 5yoM | Red Ransom - Tracy's Element |
| 2008-2009 | | 4yoM | - |
| 2007-2008 | | 4yoM | - |
| 2006-2007 | | 5yoM | - |
| 2005-2006 | Makybe Diva | 7yoM | Desert King - Tugela |
| 2004-2005 | Grand Armee | 6yoG | Hennessy - Tambour |
| 2003-2004 | Lonhro | 5yoH | Octagonal - Shadea |
| 2002-2003 | Northerly | 6yoG | Dehere - North Bell |
| 2001-2002 | Northerly | 5yoG | Dehere - North Bell |
| 2000-2001 | Sunline | 5yoM | Desert Sun - Songline |
| 1999-2000 | Sunline | 4yoM | Desert Sun - Songline |

== Other Australian Thoroughbred Awards ==
Australian Champion Racehorse of the Year
Australian Champion Two Year Old
Australian Champion Three Year Old
Australian Champion Sprinter
Australian Champion Stayer
Australian Champion Filly or Mare
Australian Champion International Performer
Australian Champion Jumper
Australian Champion Trainer
