= Anamoe =

Australian thoroughbred racehorse

- Racing Silks of Godolphin
- Sire: Street Boss
- Grandsire: Street Cry
- Dam: Anamato
- Damsire: Redoute's Choice
- Sex: Stallion
- Foaled: 16 November 2018
- Country: Australia
- Colour: Bay or Brown
- Breeder: Godolphin
- Owner: Godolphin
- Trainer: James Cummings
- Jockey: James McDonald
- Record: 25 14–5–3
- Earnings: AU$ $11,703,025

Major wins
- Todman Stakes (2021); Sires' Produce Stakes (2021); The Run to the Rose (2021); Caulfield Guineas (2021); Hobartville Stakes (2022); Rosehill Guineas (2022); Winx Stakes (2022); George Main Stakes (2022); Caulfield Stakes (2022); W.S. Cox Plate (2022); Apollo Stakes (2023); Chipping Norton Stakes (2023); George Ryder Stakes (2023)

Awards
- Australian Champion Three Year Old Colt/Gelding (2021/22); Australian Champion Racehorse of the Year (2022/23); Australian Champion Middle Distance Racehorse (2022/23)

Anamoe (foaled 16 November 2018) is a retired nine-time Group 1 winning champion Australian thoroughbred racehorse and breeding stallion. Affectionately known as "The Big A", Anamoe is considered one of the most decorated Australian produced stallions ever. He is one of only two Australian horses to win Group 1 races at ages 2, 3 and 4 since the 1990s. In 2023 he was named Australian Champion Racehorse of the Year.

== Background ==
A homebred for Godolphin, Anamoe is a half-brother to Irish stakes-winner Anamba and is out of the 2007 Australasian Oaks winner Anamato.

== Racing career ==
=== 2020/21: two-year-old season ===
Anamoe finished fifth in his race debut in the Listed Debutant Stakes at Caulfield in October 2020, before opening his account in the Listed Merson Cooper Stakes at Sandown a month later. Winning jockey Damien Oliver said after the win, "That was a nice effort. He's a nice horse with ability".

After a third placing in the Blue Diamond Stakes, Anamoe travelled to Sydney and won the Todman Stakes. He then finished in second placing in the Golden Slipper before winning the Group 1 Sires' Produce Stakes at Randwick.

=== 2021/22: three-year-old season ===
Anamoe resumed racing as a three-year-old on the 11 September 2021 at Kembla Grange in The Run to the Rose. He won the race by a neck margin with his jockey James McDonald stating afterwards "He has a tremendous will to win this horse. I knew once he was in his eyesight (of the leader) he would get him."

After going under by a short margin in the Golden Rose a fortnight later, Anamoe was sent to Caulfield to contest the Caulfield Guineas on the 9 October 2021. Starting the $2.10 favourite, jockey Damien Oliver positioned the three-year-old colt perfectly after contending with a wide barrier. In the straight he launched a barnstorming finish over the final 200m to win by a half a length. Oliver said after the race, "He’s a magnificent horse. He’s like a lot of good horses, he knows he’s good, pricks his ears for the camera.”

On 23 October Anamoe was placed second in the Cox Plate behind State Of Rest with Verry Elleegant third. Anamoe's jockey Craig Williams protested against the result due to interference, however the objection was controversially dismissed by stewards.

Anamoe raced again on the 29 January 2022 in the Expressway Stakes over 1,200 metres at Rosehill, where he finished in third place beaten less than one length.

He raced again three weeks later at Rosehill and this time was successful in the Hobartville Stakes over 1,400 metres.

After finishing a close second at his next start in the Randwick Guineas, Anamoe then contested the Rosehill Guineas over 2,000 metres on the 19 March. Starting the $1.70 favourite, Anamoe comfortably won the race by six-and-a-half lengths.

Anamoe next contested the Queen Elizabeth Stakes but finished in last place due to the heavy track conditions.

=== 2022/23: four-year-old season ===
Anamoe resumed from a break and won his fourth Group 1 race when successful in the 2022 Winx Stakes. Anamoe would then go on to contest in the Group 1 George Main Stakes which he would go on to win comfortably. He would then go on to win his sixth Group One running over the top of I'm Thunderstruck and Zaaki in the Caulfield Stakes.

He would then go onto to conqueror the Cox Plate in a dominant display after a controversial protest costing him the year before.

He would then contest in the Mackinnon Stakes being defeated by Zaaki in a valiant effort. He would then be spelled not racing again till the autumn finishing 2022 as a 7 time Group One winner.

Anamoe would then return to racing contesting in and winning the 2023 Group 2 Apollo Stakes winning it comfortably.

He would then go and win his eighth Group 1 destroying the field in the Chipping Norton Stakes. He then earned Group 1 win number nine winning the George Ryder Stakes overcoming a three wide run to run over the top of the field.

He would then contest his 25th and final race being defeated by English raider Dubai Honour in the Queen Elizabeth Stakes spoiling a farewell in front of a home crowd for the Australian Champion.

=== Retirement ===
After contesting the Queen Elizabeth Stakes, Godolphin and connections made the decision to retire Anamoe to stud early instead of sending him to Royal Ascot to contest races in England before retirement. Anamoe was retired to Darley Australia. Anamoe's first-season stud fee is the highest of any Australian stallion retired to stud in history. His first up stud fee is $121,000.

== Pedigree ==
Pedigree of Anamoe (AUS) 2018
Sire Street Boss (USA) 2004	Street Cry (IRE); 1998	Machiavellian	Mr. Prospector
Sire Street Boss (USA) 2004	Street Cry (IRE); 1998	Machiavellian	Coup de Folie
Sire Street Boss (USA) 2004	Street Cry (IRE); 1998	Helen Street	Troy
Sire Street Boss (USA) 2004	Street Cry (IRE); 1998	Helen Street	Waterway
Sire Street Boss (USA) 2004	Blushing Ogygian (USA); 1994	Ogygian	Damascus
Sire Street Boss (USA) 2004	Blushing Ogygian (USA); 1994	Ogygian	Gonfalon
Sire Street Boss (USA) 2004	Blushing Ogygian (USA); 1994	Fruhlingshochzeit	Blushing Groom
Sire Street Boss (USA) 2004	Blushing Ogygian (USA); 1994	Fruhlingshochzeit	Fruhlingstag
Dam Anamato (AUS) 2003	Redoute's Choice (AUS); 1996	Danehill	Danzig
Dam Anamato (AUS) 2003	Redoute's Choice (AUS); 1996	Danehill	Razyana
Dam Anamato (AUS) 2003	Redoute's Choice (AUS); 1996	Shantha's Choice	Canny Lad
Dam Anamato (AUS) 2003	Redoute's Choice (AUS); 1996	Shantha's Choice	Dancing Show
Dam Anamato (AUS) 2003	Voltage (AUS); 1984	Whiskey Road	Nijinsky
Dam Anamato (AUS) 2003	Voltage (AUS); 1984	Whiskey Road	Bowl of Flowers
Dam Anamato (AUS) 2003	Voltage (AUS); 1984	Electric Belle	Sovereign Edition
Dam Anamato (AUS) 2003	Voltage (AUS); 1984	Electric Belle	Dame Belle
