= Australian Champion Filly or Mare =

The Australian Champion Filly or Mare is awarded to the Thoroughbred filly or mare who is voted to be the superior female racehorse within an Australian racing season.

This award began as Australian Champion Mare; however, it was expanded to include fillies from the 1998 - 1999 season.

Australian Champion Filly or Mare
Year / Season	Horse	Sex	Breeding
1993-1994	Flitter (AUS)	4yo m	Bluebird - Kiwi Magic
1994-1995	Starstruck (AUS)	5yo m	Haulpak - Colour me Red
1995-1996	Electronic (NZ)	5yo m	First Norman - Agean Blue
1996-1997	Arctic Scent (AUS)	4yo m	Blazing Sword - Polar Rose
1997-1998	Dane Ripper (AUS)	4yo m	Danehill - Red Express
1998-1999	Grand Archway (AUS)	3yo f	Archway - Mean Eyes
1999-2000	Sunline (NZ)	4yo m	Desert Sun - Songline
2000-2001	Sunline (NZ)	5yo m	Desert Sun - Songline
2001-2002	Sunline (NZ)	6yo m	Desert Sun - Songline
2002-2003	Not awarded
2003-2004	Private Steer (AUS)	4yo m	Danehill Dancer - Lishenowen
2004-2005	Makybe Diva (GB)	6yo m	Desert King - Tugela

== Other Australian Thoroughbred awards ==
- Australian Champion Racehorse of the Year
- Australian Champion Two Year Old
- Australian Champion Three Year Old
- Australian Champion Sprinter
- Australian Champion Middle Distance Racehorse
- Australian Champion Stayer
- Australian Champion International Performer
- Australian Champion Jumper
- Australian Champion Trainer
