= Australian Champion Racehorse of the Year =

Australian horse racing award

The Australian Champion Racehorse of the Year is awarded to the Thoroughbred horse who is voted to be the champion horse within an Australian racing season. This award is open to all racehorses racing within Australia, regardless of age and sex, and includes overseas performances.

This award originally started as the VRC Award and was renamed Australia's Champion Racehorse in 1982. A separate award was voted on between 1976/77 and 1993/4 by the Australian Racing Writers' Association with the only variations being Gurner's Lane (1982/3) and Bonecrusher (1986/7). The voting bodies combined from 1993/4.

Winx has won the award four times. Black Caviar and Sunline won it three times.

Australian Champion Racehorse of the Year
Season	Horse	Age	Sex	Sire	Dam
2025-2026	Autumn Glow (AUS)	4yo	M	The Autumn Sun (AUS)	Via Africa (SAF)
2024-2025	Via Sistina (IRE)	6yo	M	Fastnet Rock (AUS)	Nigh (IRE)
2023-2024	Pride Of Jenni (AUS)	6yo	M	Pride of Dubai (AUS)	Sancerre (NZ)
2022-2023	Anamoe (Aus)	4yo	C	Street Boss (US)	Anamato (Aus)
2021-2022	Nature Strip (Aus)	7yo	G	Nicconi (Aus)	Strikeline (Aus)
2020-2021	Verry Elleegant (NZ)	5yo	M	Zed (NZ)	Opulence (NZ)
2019-2020	Nature Strip (Aus)	5yo	G	Nicconi (Aus)	Strikeline (Aus)
2018-2019	Winx (Aus)	7yo	M	Street Cry (IRE)	Vegas Showgirl (NZ)
2017-2018	Winx (Aus)	6yo	M	Street Cry (IRE)	Vegas Showgirl (NZ)
2016-2017	Winx (Aus)	5yo	M	Street Cry (IRE)	Vegas Showgirl (NZ)
2015-2016	Winx (Aus)	4yo	M	Street Cry (IRE)	Vegas Showgirl (NZ)
2014-2015	Dissident (Aus)	4yo	C	Sebring (Aus)	Diana's Secret (Aus)
2013-2014	Lankan Rupee (Aus)	5yo	G	Redoute's Choice	Estelle Collection (NZ)
2012-2013	Black Caviar (Aus)	6yo	M	Bel Esprit (Aus)	Helsinge (Aus)
2011-2012	Black Caviar (Aus)	5yo	M	Bel Esprit (Aus)	Helsinge (Aus)
2010-2011	Black Caviar (Aus)	4yo	M	Bel Esprit (Aus)	Helsinge (Aus)
2009-2010	Typhoon Tracy (Aus)	5yo	M	Red Ransom (USA)	Tracy's Element (Aus)
2008-2009	Scenic Blast (Aus)	5yo	G	Scenic (Ire)	Daughters Charm (Aus)
2007-2008	Weekend Hussler (Aus)	3yo	G	Hussonet (USA)	Weekend Beauty (Aus)
2006-2007	Miss Andretti (Aus)	6yo	M	Ihtiram (Ire)	Peggie's Bid (Aus)
2005-2006	Makybe Diva (GB)	7yo	M	Desert King (Ire)	Tugela (USA)
2004-2005	Makybe Diva (GB)	6yo	M	Desert King (Ire)	Tugela (USA)
2003-2004	Lonhro (Aus)	5yo	H	Octagonal (NZ)	Shadea (NZ)
2002-2003	Northerly (Aus)	6yo	G	Serheed (USA)	North Bell (Aus)
2001-2002	Sunline (NZ)	6yo	M	Desert Sun (GB)	Songline (NZ)
2000-2001	Sunline (NZ)	5yo	M	Desert Sun (GB)	Songline (NZ)
1999-2000	Sunline (NZ)	4yo	M	Desert Sun (GB)	Songline (NZ)
1998-1999	Might and Power (NZ)	5yo	G	Zabeel (NZ)	Benediction (Ire)
1997-1998	Might and Power (NZ)	4yo	G	Zabeel (NZ)	Benediction (Ire)
1996-1997	Saintly (Aus)	4yo	G	Sky Chase (NZ)	All Grace (NZ)
1995-1996	Octagonal (NZ)	3yo	C	Zabeel (NZ)	Eight Carat (GB)
1994-1995	Jeune (GB)	6yo	H	Kalaglow (Ire)	Youthful (Fr)
1993-1994	Mahogany (Aus)	3yo	G	Last Tycoon (Ire)	Alshandegha (USA)
1992-1993	Veandercross (NZ)	4yo	G	Crossways (GB)	Lavender (NZ)
1991-1992	Let's Elope (NZ)	4yo	M	Nassipour (USA)	Sharon Jane (NZ)
1990-1991	Better Loosen Up (Aus)	5yo	G	Loosen Up (USA)	Better Fantasy (Aus)
1989-1990	Almaarad (Ire)	7yo	H	Ela-Mana-Mou (Ire)	Silk Blend (Ire)
1988-1989	Research (Aus)	3yo	F	Imperial Prince (Ire)	Outing (Aus)
1987-1988	Beau Zam (NZ)	3yo	C	Zamazaan (Fr)	Belle Cherie (NZ)
1986-1987	Placid Ark* (Aus)	3yo	C	Arkenstone (Aus)	Northern Queen (Aus)
1986-1987	Bonecrusher (NZ)	4yo	G	Pag Asa (Aus)	Imitation (NZ)
1985-1986	Bounding Away (Aus)	2yo	F	Biscay (Aus)	Who Can Say (NZ)
1984-1985	Red Anchor (NZ)	3yo	H	Sea Anchor (Ire)	Decoy Girl (GB)
1983-1984	Emancipation (Aus)	4yo	M	Bletchingly (Aus)	Ammo Girl (Aus)
1982-1983	Gurner's Lane* (NZ)	4yo	G	Sir Tristram (Ire)	Taiona (NZ)
1982-1983	Strawberry Road (Aus)	3yo	C	Whiskey Road (USA)	Giftisa (NZ)
1981-1982	Rose Of Kingston (Aus)	3yo	F	Claude (Ity)	Kingston Rose (Aus)
1980-1981	Hyperno (NZ)	7yo	G	Rangong (GB)	Mikarla (NZ)
1979-1980	Kingston Town (Aus)	3yo	G	Bletchingly (Aus)	Ada Hunter (Ger)
1978-1979	Manikato (Aus)	3yo	G	Manihi (Aus)	Markato (Aus)
1977-1978	Maybe Mahal (Aus)	5yo	M	Maybe Lad (Aus)	Faithfully Yours (Aus)
1976-1977	Surround (NZ)	3yo	F	Sovereign Edition (Ire)	Micheline (NZ)
1975-1976	Lord Dudley (Aus)	3yo	C	Right Honourable II (GB)	Jane Hero (Aus)
1974-1975	Leilani (NZ)	4yo	M	Oncidium (GB)	Lei (NZ)
1973-1974	Taj Rossi (Aus)	3yo	C	Matrice (Aus)	Dark Queen (Aus)
1972-1973	Dayana (NZ)	3yo	G	Oncidium (GB)	Dicidiana (NZ)
1971-1972	Gunsynd (Aus)	5yo	H	Sunset Hue (Aus)	Woodie Wonder (Aus)
1970-1971	Gay Icarus (Aus)	4yo	G	Icarus (GB)	Gay M'Selle (Aus)
1969-1970	Vain (Aus)	3yo	C	Wilkes (Fr)	Elated (Aus)
1968-1969	Rain Lover (Aus)	4yo	H	Latin Lover (GB)	Rain Spot (Aus)

* Two awards made in 1982-83 & 1986-87 with ARWA selecting different winner

== Other Australian Thoroughbred Awards ==
Australian Champion Two Year Old
Australian Champion Three Year Old
Australian Champion Sprinter
Australian Champion Middle Distance Racehorse
Australian Champion Stayer
Australian Champion Filly or Mare
Australian Champion International Performer
Australian Champion Jumper
Australian Champion Trainer
