= Octagonal (horse) =

New Zealand-bred Thoroughbred racehorse

- Sire: Zabeel
- Grandsire: Sir Tristram
- Dam: Eight Carat
- Damsire: Pieces of Eight
- Sex: Stallion
- Foaled: 8 October 1992
- Died: 15 October 2016 (aged 24)
- Country: New Zealand
- Colour: Brown
- Breeder: Patrick & Justine Hogan
- Owner: Jack & Bob Ingham
- Trainer: John Hawkes
- Record: 28: 14-7-1
- Earnings: A$5,892,231.

Major wins
- AJC Sires Produce Stakes (1995); W. S. Cox Plate (1995); Canterbury Guineas (1996); Rosehill Guineas (1996); Australian Derby (1996); Mercedes Classic (1996, 1997); Underwood Stakes (1996); Australian Cup (1997); Chipping Norton Stakes (1997)

Awards
- Australian Champion Two Year Old (1995); Australian Champion Three Year Old (1996); Australian Horse of the Year (1996)

Honours
- Australian Racing Hall of Fame
- Last updated on 24 October 2007

Octagonal (8 October 1992 – 15 October 2016) was a champion New Zealand-bred, Australian raced Thoroughbred racehorse, also known as 'The Big O' or 'Occy'. He was by the champion sire Zabeel, out of the champion broodmare Eight Carat, who also produced Group One winners Mouawad, Kaapstad, Diamond Lover and (Our) Marquise.

== Biography ==
Bob Ingham, along with brother Jack Ingham, purchased and raced Octagonal. Trained by John Hawkes, Octagonal made his debut late in 1994, and was crowned the Australian Champion Two Year Old on the strength of his autumn campaign, which comprised wins in the Todman Trial and AJC Sires Produce Stakes and close seconds in the STC Golden Slipper and AJC Champagne Stakes.

As a three-year-old, Octagonal won seven of his eleven starts, and took his record to 10 wins from 16 starts. In addition to beating a high-standard crop in Sydney's three-year-old autumn triple crown - the Canterbury and Rosehill Guineas and the Australian Derby - Octagonal won the two richest weight-for-age races on the Australian calendar, the W. S. Cox Plate and the Mercedes Classic. With earnings of just short of A$4 million, Octagonal was voted the 1996 Australian Champion Three Year Old, Australian Horse of the Year, and remains the last horse to have won the triple crown. The Victoria (spring) and Australian Derby (autumn) double eluded him, however, as he was narrowly defeated by Nothin' Leica Dane in the Victoria Derby.

Octagonal returned to the track as a four-year-old, but his win the Underwood Stakes was the only highlight of a spring campaign that saw him unplaced in six of his seven starts. Meanwhile, the horses who had finished second to him in the triple crown - Saintly and Filante - won three races each, including the Epsom Handicap, the W. S. Cox Plate (where they were first and second), and the Melbourne Cup. Octagonal's final campaign, during the autumn, was more consistent, and featured Group One wins in consecutive starts in the Chipping Norton Stakes, Australian Cup, and the Mercedes Classic. At his final start, he was runner-up in the AJC Queen Elizabeth Stakes; a feat coincidentally emulated in the farewell of his champion son, Lonhro, seven years later.

Octagonal retired to stud after 28 starts with a record of 14 wins (10 Group 1), 7 seconds (6 in GI or GII races) and a third. He ended his racing career with a stakes tally of A$5,892,231, the highest of any galloper in Australasia to that point.

Octagonal Entered stud in 1997–2013 Woodlands Stud at Cootamundra, New South Wales and Shuttled in 1998–2001 to Haras du Quesnay France and was pensioned from stud duties in 2013. He is the sire of Australian Group One winning brothers Lonhro and Niello, the South African Group 1 winner, Suntagonal and Laverock whose wins include two Group 1 races: the Prix d'Ispahan at Longchamp Racecourse in Paris and the Gran Premio del Jockey Club at Milan, Italy's, San Siro Racecourse.

He was euthanized on 15 October 2016 at the age of 24 years at Woodlands Stud at Denman in the NSW Hunter Valley. He was buried next to his fellow stallion mate Canny Lad. Owner Bob Ingham described his career as 'heroic' and 'life-changing'.

== Race record ==
1994–95 season as a two-year-old
Result	Date	Race	Venue	Group	Distance	Weight (kg)	Jockey	Winner/2nd
Won	3 Dec 1994	2yo Hcp Colts & Geldings	Rosehill	NA	1100 m	53	M. Evans	2nd - Fracture
Won	25 Mar 1995	Todman Stakes	Rosehill	G2	1200 m	55.5	Grant Cooksley	2nd - Our Maizcay
2nd	8 Apr 1995	Golden Slipper	Rosehill	G1	1200 m	55.5	G. Cooksley	1st - Flying Spur
Won	17 Apr 1995	Sires Produce Stakes	Randwick	G1	1400 m	55.5	G. Cooksley	2nd - Isolda
2nd	29 Apr 1995	Champagne Stakes	Randwick	G1	1600 m	55.5	G. Cooksley	1st - Isolda

1995–96 season as a three-year-old
Result	Date	Race	Venue	Group	Distance	Weight (kg)	Jockey	Winner/2nd
2nd	2 Sep 1995	Roman Consul Stakes	Randwick	G3	1200 m	55	G. Cooksley	1st - Our Maizcay
Won	16 Sep 1995	Heritage Stakes	Rosehill	LR	1300 m	55.5	G. Cooksley	2nd - Mi Modest
Won	2 Oct 1995	Stan Fox Stakes	Randwick	G3	1400 m	55	G. Cooksley	2nd - Encores
3rd	14 Oct 1995	Caulfield Guineas	Caulfield	G1	1600 m	55.5	Darren Gauci	1st - Our Maizcay
Won	28 Oct 1995	Cox Plate	Moonee Valley	G1	2040 m	48.5	Shane Dye	2nd - Mahogany
2nd	4 Nov 1995	Victoria Derby	Flemington	G1	2500 m	55.5	Shane Scriven	1st - Nothin' Leica Dane
2nd	24 Feb 1996	Hobartville Stakes	Warwick Farm	G2	1400 m	55.5	G. Cooksley	1st - Nothin' Leica Dane
Won	9 Mar 1996	Canterbury Guineas	Canterbury	G1	1900 m	55.5	Darren Beadman	2nd - Filante
Won	23 Mar 1996	Rosehill Guineas	Rosehill	G1	2000 m	55.5	D. Beadman	2nd - Saintly
Won	30 Mar 1996	Mercedes Classic	Rosehill	G1	2400 m	52	D. Beadman	2nd - Count Chivas
Won	6 Apr 1996	Australian Derby	Randwick	G1	2400 m	55.5	D. Beadman	2nd - Saintly

1996–97 season as a four-year-old
Result	Date	Race	Venue	Group	Distance	Weight (kg)	Jockey	Winner/2nd
6th	17 Aug 1996	Manikato Stakes	Moonee Valley	G1	1200 m	57	D. Gauci	1st - Poetic King
7th	31 Aug 1996	Memsie Stakes	Caulfield	G2	1400 m	57	D. Gauci	1st - Sir Boom
5th	14 Sep 1996	Feehan Stakes	Moonee Valley	G2	1600 m	57	D. Gauci	1st - Toil
Won	22 Sep 1996	Underwood Stakes	Caulfield	G1	1800 m	57	D. Beadman	2nd - Seascay
4th	12 Oct 1996	Caulfield Stakes	Caulfield	G1	2000 m	57	D. Beadman	1st - Juggler
5th	26 Oct 1996	Cox Plate	Moonee Valley	G1	2040 m	57	D. Gauci	1st - Saintly
9th	2 Nov 1996	Mackinnon Stakes	Flemington	G1	2000 m	57	D. Beadman	1st - All Our Mob
2nd	15 Feb 1997	Apollo Stakes	Warwick Farm	G2	1400 m	57	D. Beadman	1st - Juggler
Won	22 Feb 1997	Chipping Norton Stakes	Warwick Farm	G1	1600 m	57	S. Dye	2nd - Juggler
Won	10 Mar 1997	Australian Cup	Flemington	G1	2000 m	57	S. Dye	2nd - Gold City
Won	22 Mar 1997	Mercedes Classic	Rosehill	G1	2400 m	57	S. Dye	2nd - Arkady
2nd	12 Apr 1997	Queen Elizabeth Stakes	Randwick	G1	2000 m	57	S. Dye	1st - Intergaze

== Progeny ==
Octagonal's major race winners include:

Horse	Race	Distance (m)	Prizemoney (AUD)
Lonhro	2001 Caulfield Guineas; 2002 Mackinnon Stakes; 2003 Chipping Norton Stakes; 2003 Queen Elizabeth Stakes; 2003 George Main Stakes; 2002 & 2003 Caulfield Stakes; 2003 & 2004 George Ryder Stakes; 2004 C F Orr Stakes; 2004 Australian Cup	1600; 2000; 1600; 2000; 1600; 2000; 1500; 1400; 2000	$5,790,510
Laverock	2006 Prix d'Ispahan (Paris); 2006 Gran Premio del Jockey Club (Milan)	2000; 2400	$1,154,190
Niello	2003 Spring Champion Stakes; 2004 Canterbury Guineas; 2004 Rosehill Guineas	2000; 1900; 2000	$959,200
Suntagonal	2002 Premier's Champion Stakes (Durban)	1400	R496,400

== Pedigree ==
Pedigree of Octagonal (NZ)
Sire Zabeel (NZ) 1986	Sir Tristram (Ire); 1971	Sir Ivor (USA); 1965	Sir Gaylord (USA)
Sire Zabeel (NZ) 1986	Sir Tristram (Ire); 1971	Sir Ivor (USA); 1965	Attica (USA)
Sire Zabeel (NZ) 1986	Sir Tristram (Ire); 1971	Isolt (USA); 1961	Round Table (USA)
Sire Zabeel (NZ) 1986	Sir Tristram (Ire); 1971	Isolt (USA); 1961	All My Eye (GB)
Sire Zabeel (NZ) 1986	Lady Giselle (Fr); 1982	Nureyev (USA); 1977	Northern Dancer (Can)
Sire Zabeel (NZ) 1986	Lady Giselle (Fr); 1982	Nureyev (USA); 1977	Special (USA)
Sire Zabeel (NZ) 1986	Lady Giselle (Fr); 1982	Valderna (Fr); 1972	Val de Loir (Fr)
Sire Zabeel (NZ) 1986	Lady Giselle (Fr); 1982	Valderna (Fr); 1972	Derna (Fr)
Dam Eight Carat (GB) 1975	Pieces of Eight (Ire); 1963	Relic (USA); 1945	War Relic (USA)
Dam Eight Carat (GB) 1975	Pieces of Eight (Ire); 1963	Relic (USA); 1945	Bridal Colors (USA)
Dam Eight Carat (GB) 1975	Pieces of Eight (Ire); 1963	Baby Doll (GB); 1956	Dante (GB)
Dam Eight Carat (GB) 1975	Pieces of Eight (Ire); 1963	Baby Doll (GB); 1956	Bebe Grande (Ire)
Dam Eight Carat (GB) 1975	Klairessa (GB); 1969	Klairon (Fr); 1952	Clarion (Fr)
Dam Eight Carat (GB) 1975	Klairessa (GB); 1969	Klairon (Fr); 1952	Kalmia (Fr)
Dam Eight Carat (GB) 1975	Klairessa (GB); 1969	Courtessa (GR); 1955	Supreme Court (GB)
Dam Eight Carat (GB) 1975	Klairessa (GB); 1969	Courtessa (GR); 1955	Tessa Gillian (GB) (Family: 9-c)

== See also ==
- Australian Champion Racehorse of the Year
