= Rodolfo Teófilo, Fortaleza =

Rodolfo Marcos Teófilo is one of the neighborhoods of Fortaleza, the capital of the state of Ceará in northeastern Brazil. Rodolfo Teófilo is home to the Universidade Federal do Ceará's (UFC) school of medicine and hospital.
