= Apollo Stakes =

- Class: Group 2
- Location: Randwick Racecourse, Sydney, Australia
- Inaugurated: 1977
- Race type: Thoroughbred
- Sponsor: https://petaluma.com.au/ (2024-26)

Race information
- Distance: 1,400 metres
- Surface: Turf
- Track: Right-handed
- Qualification: Three year olds and older
- Weight: Weight for Age
- Purse: $300,000 (2025)

The Apollo Stakes is an Australian Turf Club Group 2 Thoroughbred horse race for three years and older, held under Weight for Age conditions over a distance of 1400 metres at Randwick Racecourse, Sydney, Australia in February.

== History ==
=== Name ===
- 1977–2006 - Apollo Stakes
- 2007–2010 - Winning Edge Presentations Classic
- 2011 onwards - Apollo Stakes

=== Grade ===
- 1977–1978 - Principal Race
- 1979 onwards - Group 2

=== Venue ===
- 1977–1992 - Randwick Racecourse
- 1993–2001 - Warwick Farm Racecourse
- 2002–2005 - Randwick Racecourse
- 2005–2012 - Rosehill Gardens Racecourse
- 2014 onwards - Randwick Racecourse

== Winners ==
The following are past winners of the race.

- 2026 - Autumn Glow
- 2025 - Fangirl
- 2024 - Fangirl
- 2023 - Anamoe
- 2022 - Think It Over
- 2021 - Colette
- 2020 - Alizee
- 2019 - Winx
- 2018 - Endless Drama
- 2017 - Winx
- 2016 - Winx
- 2015 - Contributer
- 2014 - Appearance
- 2013 - Alma's Fury
- 2012 - Rain Affair
- 2011 - Melito
- 2010 - Danleigh
- 2009 - Tuesday Joy
- 2008 - Racing To Win
- 2007 - Desert War
- 2006 - Ike's Dream
- 2005 - Grand Armee
- 2004 - Private Steer
- 2003 - Lonhro
- 2002 - Ha Ha
- 2001 - Sunline
- 2000 - Sunline
- 1999 - Kidman's Cove
- 1998 - Quick Flick
- 1997 - Juggler
- 1996 - Juggler
- 1995 - Pharaoh
- 1994 - Burst
- 1993 - Naturalism
- 1992 - Quick Score
- 1991 - Triscay
- 1990 - Key Dancer
- 1989 - Beau Zam
- 1988 - At Sea
- 1987 - Diamond Shower
- 1986 - Drawn
- 1985 - Red Anchor
- 1984 - Emancipation
- 1983 - Dalmacia
- 1982 - Calm Joe
- 1981 - Red Nose
- 1980 - Embasadora
- 1979 - Scomeld
- 1978 - Just Ideal
- 1977 - Visit

== See also ==
- List of Australian Group races
- Group races
