= Australian Champion Sprinter =

Australian award for sprinter horses

The Australian Champion Sprinter is awarded annually to the Thoroughbred horse whose performances in Australia over distances between 1000m and 1400m are deemed to be the superior to other horses. It has been awarded since the 1998 - 1999 season.

Australian Champion Sprinter
Year / Season	Horse	Sex	Breeding
2023-2024	Imperatriz	5yo M	I Am Invincible - Berimbau
2022-2023	Giga Kick	3yo G	Scissor Kick - Rekindled Applause
2021-2022	Nature Strip	7yo G	Nicconi-Strikeline
2020-2021	Nature Strip	6yo G	Nicconi-Strikeline
2019-2020	Nature Strip	5yo G	Nicconi-Strikeline
2018-2019	Santa Ana Lane	6yo G	Lope de Vega - Fast Fleet
2017-2018	Redzel	5yo G	Snitzel - Millrich
2016-2017	Chautauqua	6yo G	Encosta de Lago - Lovely Jubly
2015-2016	Chautauqua	5yo G	Encosta de Lago - Lovely Jubly
2014-2015	Dissident	4yo H	Sebring - Diana's Secret
2013-2014	Lankan Rupee	5yo G	Redoute's Choice - Estelle Collection
2012-2013	Black Caviar (Aus)	7yo M	Bel Esprit - Helsinge
2011-2012	Black Caviar (Aus)	6yo M	Bel Esprit - Helsinge
2010-2011	Black Caviar (Aus)	5yo M	Bel Esprit - Helsinge
2009–2010	Starspangledbanner (Aus)	4yo H	Choisir - Gold Anthem
2008–2009	Scenic Blast (Aus)	5yo G	Scenic (IRE) - Daughters Charm (Aus)
2007–2008	Apache Cat	5yoG	Lion Cavern – Tennessee Blaze
2006–2007	Miss Andretti	5yoM	Ihtiram – Peggie's Bid
2005–2006	Takeover Target	6yoG	Celtic Swing - Shady Stream
2004–2005	Fastnet Rock	3yoC	Danehill - Piccadilly Circus
2003–2004	Exceed And Excel	3yoC	Danehill - Petrona
2002–2003	Yell	3yoG	Anabaa - Vocalist
2001–2002	Falvelon	5yoH	Alannon - Devil's Zephyr
2000–2001	Falvelon	4yoH	Alannon - Devil's Zephyr
1999–2000	Testa Rossa	3yoC	Perugino - Bo Dapper
1998–1999	Isca	3yoF	Rory's Jester - My First Star

== Other Australian Thoroughbred Awards ==
Australian Champion Racehorse of the Year
Australian Champion Two Year Old
Australian Champion Three Year Old
Australian Champion Middle Distance Racehorse
Australian Champion Stayer
Australian Champion Filly or Mare
Australian Champion International Performer
Australian Champion Jumper
Australian Champion Trainer

== See also ==
- Thoroughbred racing in Australia
