= Dane Ripper =

Australian-bred Thoroughbred racehorse

- Sire: Danehill
- Grandsire: Danzig
- Dam: Red Express
- Damsire: Sovereign Red
- Sex: Mare
- Foaled: 2 October 1993
- Country: Australia
- Colour: Brown
- Trainer: Bart Cummings
- Record: 29: 12-2-6
- Earnings: A$3,151,833

Major wins
- Stradbroke Handicap (1997); W S Cox Plate (1997); Australian Cup (1998); Manikato Stakes (1998)

Awards
- Australian Champion Filly or Mare (1998)

Honours
- Dane Ripper Stakes, Eagle Farm Racecourse

Dane Ripper is an Australian Thoroughbred race horse. Trained by Bart Cummings, she was the winner of a number of Group races:

- 1997 Stradbroke Handicap, when ridden by Chris Munce, beating Quick Flick and Celestial Choir
- 1997 Cox Plate, when ridden by Damien Oliver, beating Filante and Vialli
- 1998 St George Stakes, when ridden by Steven King, beating Might and Power and Rustic Dream
- 1998 Australian Cup (King) beating Deinquent and Marble Halls
- 1998 Memsie Stakes (Oliver) beating Willoughby and La Volta
- 1998 Manikato Stakes (Oliver) beating Sir Boom and Theatre.
