= Teófilo =

Teófilo is a given name. People with the name include:

- Teófilo Barrios (born 1964), Paraguayan football (soccer) defender
- Teófilo Benito (1966–2004), Spanish middle-distance runner
- Teófilo Borunda (1912–2001), Mexican politician
- Teófilo Braga (1843–1924), Portuguese politician, writer and playwright
- Teófilo Carvalho dos Santos (1906–1986), Portuguese politician
- Teófilo Chantre (born 1964), Cape Verdean musician
- Teófilo Cruz (1942–2005), Puerto Rican professional basketball player
- Teófilo Cubillas (born 1949), Peruvian former footballer
- Teófilo Dias (1854–1889), Brazilian poet, journalist and lawyer, nephew of Gonçalves Dias
- Teófilo Ferreira (born 1973), Brazilian international freestyle swimmer
- Teófilo Forero (died 1989), Colombian politician and trade unionist
- Teófilo Gutiérrez (born 1985), Colombian football player
- Teófilo José Jaime María Le Guillou, the founder in 1823 of Vieques, Puerto Rico
- Teófilo Marxuach, (1877–1939), ordered the first U.S. shot fired in World War I
- Teofilo Rossi (1865–1927), Italian lawyer and politician
- Teófilo Stevenson (1952–2012), Cuban boxer
- Teofilo Vargas Sein, the leader of the Mita Congregation, a Christian church in Puerto Rico
- Teófilo Villavicencio Marxuach (1912–1992), pioneer in Puerto Rican radio broadcasting
- Teófilo Yldefonso (1903–1943), Filipino swimmer in the breaststroke

== See also ==
- Teofilo (disambiguation)
