= Coolmore Classic =

Horse race in Sydney, Australia

Coolmore Classic registered as TAD Kennedy Stakes
- Class: Group 1
- Location: Rosehill Gardens Racecourse
- Inaugurated: 1973
- Race type: Thoroughbred
- Sponsor: Coolmore Stud (since 1996)

Race information
- Distance: 1,500 metres
- Surface: Turf
- Qualification: Three years old and over fillies and mares
- Weight: Set weights
- Purse: $1,000,000 (2026)
- Bonuses: Exempt from ballot Doncaster Mile and the Queen Of The Turf Stakes

The Coolmore Classic, registered as the TAD Kennedy Stakes is an Australian Turf Club Group 1 Thoroughbred horse race for fillies and mares aged three years old and upwards under set weights conditions, run over a distance of 1500 metres at Rosehill Gardens Racecourse, Sydney, Australia, in March.

== History ==
=== Name ===
The registered name of the race is Thomas Arthur David (TAD) Kennedy Stakes, named after a former horse trainer and Sydney Turf Club committeeman Thomas Kennedy.

The race name has changed many times since its inaugural running in 1973.

The current race name is named after the sponsor of the race – Coolmore Stud.

- 1973–1974 - Fillies & Mares Classic
- 1975–1976 - NSW Thoroughbred Breeders Stakes
- 1977–1978 - Marlboro Classic
- 1979–1985 - Rosemount Wines Classic
- 1986–1988 - Orlando Classic
- 1989–1991 - Orlando Wines Classic
- 1992–1995 - Winfield Classic
- 1996 onwards - Coolmore Classic

=== Grade ===
- 1973–1978 - Principal Race
- 1979–1983 - Group 2
- 1986 onwards - Group 1

=== Records ===
- Fastest time at 1:27.21 - Shindig (1998)
- Most wins jockey - Jim Cassidy (4)

Satin Sand (1986), Kapchat (1994), Flitter (1995) and Shamekha (2004)

- Heaviest winners - Emancipation and Sunline at 60 kg.
- Lightest winner - Crimson Cloud 48 kg.

== Winners ==
The following are past winners of the race.

- 2026 - Lazzura
- 2025 - Lady Shenandoah
- 2024 - Zougotcha
- 2023 - Espiona
- 2022 - Lighthouse
- 2021 - Krone
- 2020 - Con Te Partiro
- 2019 - Dixie Blossoms
- 2018 - Daysee Doom
- 2017 - Heavens Above
- 2016 - Peeping
- 2015 - Plucky Belle
- 2014 - Steps In Time
- 2013 - Appearance
- 2012 - Ofcourseican
- 2011 - Aloha
- 2010 - Alverta
- 2009 - Typhoon Tracy
- 2008 - Eskimo Queen
- 2007 - Tuesday Joy
- 2006 - Regal Cheer
- 2005 - Danni Martine
- 2004 - Shamekha
- 2003 - Bollinger
- 2002 - Sunline
- 2001 - Porto Roca
- 2000 - Sunline
- 1999 - Camino Rose
- 1998 - Shindig
- 1997 - Assertive Lass
- 1996 - Chlorophyll
- 1995 - Flitter
- 1994 - Kapchat
- 1993 - Skating
- 1992 - Acushla Marie
- 1991 - Quicksilver Cindy
- 1990 - Happy Sailing
- 1989 - Red Express
- 1988 - Strawberry Fair
- 1987 - Bounding Away
- 1986 - Satin Sand
- 1985 - Avon Angel
- 1984 - Emancipation
- 1983 - Hooplahannah
- 1982 - Sheraco
- 1981 - Cordon Rose
- 1980 - Stage Hit
- 1979 - Phar Talk
- 1978 - Princess Talaria
- 1977 - Somerset Pride
- 1976 - Crimson Cloud
- 1975 - Vicenza
- 1974 - Favoured
- 1973 - Miss Personality

== See also ==
- List of Australian Group races
- Group races
