= Australian Champion Three Year Old =

The Australian Champion Three Year Old is awarded annually to the three-year-old Thoroughbred horse whose performances in Australia are deemed to be the most impressive throughout the racing season.

There are two categories, Champion Three Year Old Filly and Champion Three Year Old Colt/Gelding. Prior to 2005 the award was contested by both sexes.

== Australian Champion Three Year Old Filly ==
Australian Champion Three Year Old Filly
| Year / Season | Horse | Sex | Breeding |
|---|---|---|---|
| 2024-2025 | Tresurethe Moment | Filly | Alabama Express-Draconic Treasure |
| 2023-2024 | Stefi Magnetica | Filly | All Too Hard-Mid Summer Music |
| 2022-2023 | In Secret | Filly | I Am Invincible - Eloping |
| 2021-2022 | Gypsy Goddess | Filly | Tarzino - Invisible Coin |
| 2020-2021 | Hungry Heart | Filly | Frankel - Harlech |
| 2019-2020 | Loving Gaby | Filly | I Am Invincible - Maastricht |
| 2018-2019 | Sunlight | Filly | Zoustar - Solar Charged |
| 2016-2017 | Yankee Rose | Filly | All American - Condesaar |
| 2015-2016 | English | Filly | Encosta De Lago - Court |
| 2014-2015 | Delicacy | Filly | Al Maher - Simply Wicked |
| 2013-2014 | Guelph | Filly | Exceed And Excel - Camarilla |
| 2012-2013 | Norzita | Filly | Thorn Park - Visique |
| 2011-2012 | Atlantic Jewel | Filly | Fastnet Rock - Regard |
| 2010-2011 | Shamrocker | Filly | O’Reilly - Bohemian Blues |
| 2009-2010 | Faint Perfume | Filly | Shamardal - Zona |
| 2008-2009 | Samantha Miss | Filly | Redoute's Choice - Milliyet |
| 2007-2008 | Heavenly Glow | Filly | Spinning World - Starsphere |
| 2006-2007 | Miss Finland | Filly | Redoute's Choice - Forest Pearl |
| 2005-2006 | Serenade Rose | Filly | Stravinsky - Rose of Tralee |
| 2004-2005 | Alinghi | Filly | Encosta De Lago - Oceanfast |

== Australian Champion Three Year Old Colt/Gelding ==
Australian Champion Three Year Old Colt/Gelding
| Year / Season | Horse | Sex | Breeding |
|---|---|---|---|
| 2024-2025 | Broadsiding | Colt | Too Darn Hot - Speedway |
| 2023-2024 | Riff Rocket | Gelding | American Pharoah-Missile Coda |
| 2022-2023 | Giga Kick | Gelding | Scissor Kick - Rekindled Applause |
| 2021-2022 | Anamoe | Colt | Street Boss - Anamato |
| 2020-2021 | Ole Kirk | Colt | Written Tycoon - Naturale |
| 2019-2020 | Yes Yes Yes | Colt | Rubick - Sin Sin Sin |
| 2018-2019 | The Autumn Sun | Colt | Redoute's Choice - Azmiyna |
| 2017-2018 | Trapeze Artist | Colt | Snitzel - Treppes |
| 2016-2017 | Flying Artie | Colt | Artie Schiller - Flying Ruby |
| 2015-2016 | Tarzino | Colt | Tavistock - Zarzino |
| 2014-2015 | Brazen Beau | Colt | I Am Invincible - Sansadee |
| 2013-2014 | Shamus Award | Colt | Snitzel - Sunset Express |
| 2012-2013 | All Too Hard | Colt | Casino Price - Helsinge |
| 2011-2012 | Sepoy | Colt | Elusive Quality - Watchful |
| 2010-2011 | Star Witness | Colt | Starcraft - Leone Chiara |
| 2009-2010 | So You Think | Colt | High Chaparral - Triassic |
| 2008-2009 | Whobegotyou | Gelding | Street Cry - Temple Of Peace |
| 2007-2008 | Weekend Hussler | Gelding | Hussonet - Weekend Beauty |
| 2006-2007 | Haradasun | Colt | Fusaichi Pegasus - Circles Of Gold |
| 2005-2006 | Racing to Win | Colt | Encosta De Lago - Surealist |
| 2004-2005 | Fastnet Rock | Colt | Danehill-Piccadilly Circus |

== Australian Champion Three Year Old ==
Australian Champion Three Year Old
| Year / Season | Horse | Sex | Breeding |
|---|---|---|---|
| 2003-2004 | Starcraft | Colt | Soviet Star - Flying Floozie |
| 2002-2003 | Helenus | Colt | Helissio - Worldwide Elsie |
| 2001-2002 | Lonhro | Colt | Octagonal - Shadea |
| 2000-2001 | Universal Prince | Colt | Scenic - Biscay Bird |
| 1999-2000 | Fairway | Gelding | Danzero - Our Canny |
| 1998-1999 | Grand Archway | Filly | Archway - Mean Eyes |
| 1997-1998 | Gold Guru | Gelding | Geiger Counter - Proud Halo |
| 1996-1997 | Mouawad | Colt | Zabeel - Eight Carat |
| 1995-1996 | Octagonal | Colt | Zabeel - Eight Carat |
| 1994-1995 | Danewin | Colt | Danehill - Cotehele House |
| 1993-1994 | Mahogany | Gelding | Last Tycoon - Alshandegha |

== Other Australian Thoroughbred awards ==
Australian Champion Racehorse of the Year
Australian Champion Two Year Old
Australian Champion Sprinter
Australian Champion Middle Distance Racehorse
Australian Champion Stayer
Australian Champion Filly or Mare
Australian Champion International Performer
Australian Champion Jumper
Australian Champion Trainer
