= Mamool =

Irish-bred Thoroughbred racehorse

- Sire: In The Wings
- Grandsire: Sadler's Wells
- Dam: Genovefa
- Damsire: Woodman
- Sex: Stallion
- Foaled: 1999
- Country: Ireland
- Colour: Bay
- Breeder: Mohammed bin Rashid Al Maktoum
- Owner: Godolphin Racing
- Trainer: Saeed bin Suroor
- Record: 22: 8-3-2
- Earnings: £742,317

Major wins
- Queen's Vase (2002); Yorkshire Cup (2003); Grosser Preis von Baden (2003); Preis von Europa (2003); September Stakes (2004); Glorious Stakes (2005)

Mamool (foaled 1999 in Ireland) is a Thoroughbred racehorse who raced for five years from 2001 through 2005. Bred and raced by the operations of Sheikh Mohammed bin Rashid Al Maktoum of Dubai, among Mamool's wins were the Queen's Vase and the Yorkshire Cup in England in the Group Ones Grosser Preis von Baden and Preis von Europa in Germany.
