= Tugela (horse) =

American-bred Thoroughbred racehorse

Tugela (USA) (March 2, 1995 – October 24, 2014) was a brown Thoroughbred mare. Bred by Khalid Abdullah's prominent Juddmonte Farms, Tugela was sired by Riverman and out of Rambushka who in turn was a daughter of Epsom Derby winner, Roberto, a two-time Leading sire in France.

Tugela was foaled in Kentucky, United States and is best known as the dam of Makybe Diva (GB), the champion Australian mare and three-time winner of the Melbourne Cup.
