= Makybe Diva =

British-bred Australian Thoroughbred racehorse (1999–2026)

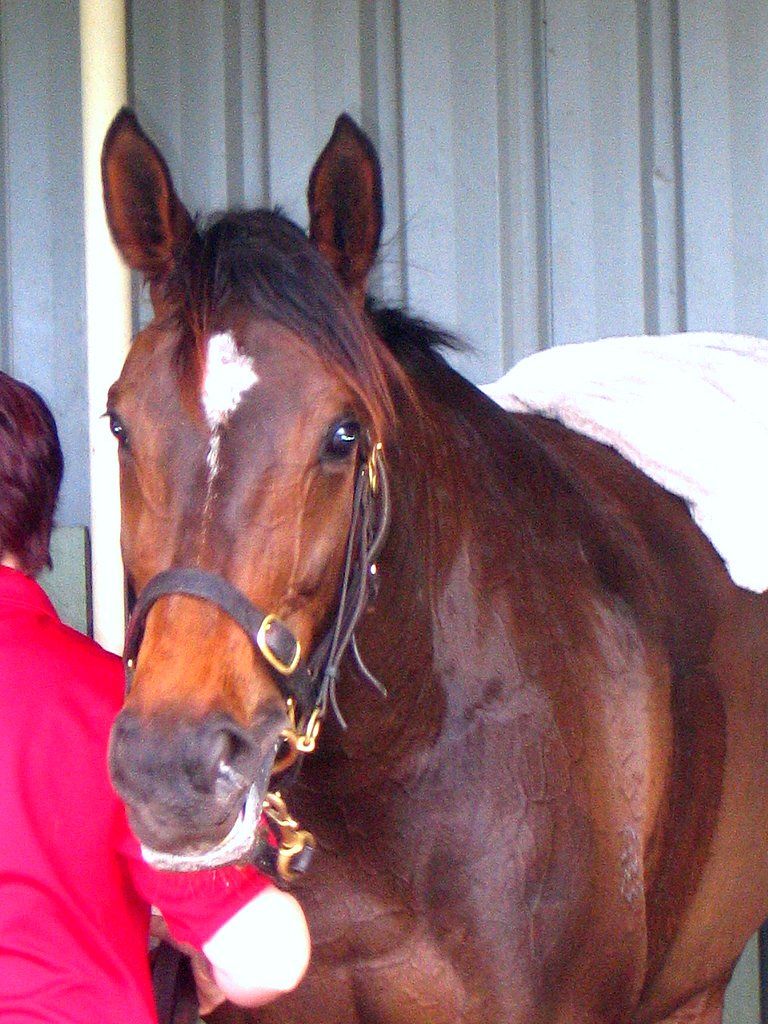
- Makybe Diva in 2010.
- Sire: Desert King
- Grandsire: Danehill
- Dam: Tugela
- Damsire: Riverman
- Sex: Mare
- Foaled: 21 March 1999; Somerset, England, United Kingdom
- Died: 28 February 2026 (aged 26); Gnarwarre, Victoria, Australia
- Country: Great Britain
- Colour: Bay
- Breeder: Emily Krstina Pty Ltd
- Owner: Tony Šantić
- Trainer: David Hall, Lee Freedman
- Record: 36: 15-4-3
- Earnings: A$14,526,685

Major wins
- VRC Queen Elizabeth Stakes (2002); Melbourne Cup (2003, 2004, 2005); Sydney Cup (2004); Australian Cup (2005); The BMW Stakes (2005); Memsie Stakes (2005); Turnbull Stakes (2005); W. S. Cox Plate (2005)

Awards
- Australian Racehorse of the Year (2005, 2006); Australian Champion Stayer (2004, 2005, 2006); Australian Champion Filly and Mare (2005); Australian Middle Distance Champion (2006); Timeform rating: 129; SA Thoroughbred Breeders Horse of the Year (2004, 2005)

Honours
- Australian Racing Hall of Fame (2006); Makybe Diva Stakes
- Last updated on 24 July 2007

Makybe Diva (21 March 1999 – 28 February 2026) was a British-bred, Australian-trained champion Thoroughbred racehorse who is the only horse to win three Melbourne Cups and the only mare to win it more than once. She achieved the feat in 2003, 2004, and 2005. She also won the 2005 Cox Plate. She was the highest stakes-earner in Australian history, winning more than A$14 million.

Makybe Diva was by Desert King (a winner of the Irish Derby and Irish 2,000 Guineas) out of Tugela by Riverman (USA). Tugela was also the dam of the Australian stakes-winners, Musket and Valkyrie Diva. Makybe Diva was owned by South Australian tuna fisherman Tony Šantić, who named her after five of his employees—Maureen, Kylie, Belinda, Diane, and Vanessa—by taking the first two letters from each of their names.

== Background ==
Tony Šantić's bloodstock agent John Foote purchased Tugela in foal to Desert King for 60,000 guineas at the December 1998 Tattersall's Sale. As normally happens with Santic's British-purchased horses, she was taken to Dick Fowlston's Britton House Stud in Somerset to board before being sent on to Australia. Tugela gave birth to a filly at five minutes past midnight on 21 March 1999. The filly was offered for sale at the 1999 Tatts Newmarket foal sale, but did not make the reserve. Named Makybe Diva, the filly remained at Britton House Stud until August 2000, when she and Tugela were shipped to Australia.

== Racing career ==
=== 2002: Three-year-old season ===
Originally trained by David Hall, Makybe Diva made her racetrack debut in late July 2002, as a three-year-old, in a maiden at Benalla, Victoria, and finished fourth.

=== 2002/2003: Four-year-old season ===
In her next start two weeks later—and now classed as a four-year-old—Makybe Diva began a six-race winning sequence in a maiden at Wangaratta, which culminated in stakes wins, three months later, in the Werribee Cup (2,000 m) and the Queen Elizabeth Stakes (2,500 m). The last win was significant in that it qualified the mare for the following year's Melbourne Cup and allowed her trainer to give her a light autumn campaign, which consisted of just two starts in relatively short races.

Makybe Diva's early career was unusual in that she was unable to contest any major races against horses of her own age, such as the VRC Oaks, because she was foaled in the U.K. to the Northern Hemisphere breeding calendar. This meant that, for Australian racing purposes, where horses "age-up" on 1 August each year, she was bracketed with horses foaled about six months earlier, in the Southern Hemisphere spring.

=== 2003/2004: Five-year-old season (Melbourne Cup 1) ===
Makybe Diva resumed racing in the spring over 1,400 m (0.87 mi), but while being reasonably competitive, she did not win any major races. Second up at her next start in the Group 3 Stock Stakes, she came from behind to finish fourth, beaten by just over two lengths. She then started 5:1 equal favourite in the Group 2 Turnbull Stakes, where she again raced at the back of the field, before finishing fourth, beaten by only one length.

After finishing as a 14-1 outsider in the Caulfield Cup, she began her partnership with Sydney jockey Glen Boss. Coming from near last with 800 m (0.50 mi) to go in the 2400-m race, she finished fourth behind the Lee Freedman-trained Mummify. The first Tuesday in November 2003 was her first Melbourne Cup victory. Starting as an $8 second favourite, Makybe Diva raced at the back of the field until the finishing straight, where jockey Boss picked his way through the field to win by 1 1/2 lengths.

In the autumn of 2004, she resumed over 1400 m (7 furlongs) carrying 59.5 kg followed by a third-place finish in the Group 3 Carlyon Cup. Following this, she was blocked when making a winning run in the Australian Cup before being taken to Sydney, where she placed third in the Ranvet Stakes and The BMW Stakes, both Group 1 races. The Group 1 Sydney Cup over 3200 m (2 mi) was to be her final run for the campaign. Sent out as a $3.50 second favourite, she began off the pace, but ran home to record a win by half a length, becoming the first mare to ever win the Sydney Cup/Melbourne Cup double in the same season, and only the fourth horse to have accomplished the double win.

After the 2003–2004 season, trainer David Hall left to train in Hong Kong, and Makybe Diva was transferred to trainer Lee Freedman, generally regarded as one of Australia's top trainers.

=== 2004/2005: Six-year-old season (Melbourne Cup 2) ===
Her campaign in the spring of 2004 was aimed at winning the Melbourne Cup for a second time. It followed the pattern of her previous cup-winning campaign, though she appeared to be racing better than before. A close second in the Group 2 John F Feehan Stakes over 1,600 m (5,200 ft) at Moonee Valley showed her competitiveness in shorter races. In the 2004 Caulfield Cup, Makybe Diva drew barrier 18 and settled at the back of the field. She was narrowly defeated by Elvstroem, who led all the way.

Makybe Diva was sent out a $3.60 favourite, and won the 2004 Melbourne Cup. In driving rain, the mare defeated a field featuring multiple Irish St. Leger winner Vinnie Roe, Caulfield Cup winners Mummify and Elvstroem, Mamool from the Godolphin stable, and the 2002 Melbourne Cup winner Media Puzzle.

Resuming racing in February, Makybe Diva put in close finishes behind Elvstroem in both the C F Orr Stakes and St George Stakes, at Caulfield. On 12 March, she won the Australian Cup, a weight for age event over 2,000 m (6,600 ft), and in the process broke the Australian record and set an unofficial world record for 2000 m on turf. She proceeded to win Sydney's most important WFA race, the BMW Stakes, with a last-to-first burst. In April and May, she raced in Japan, where she failed in two starts, the latter of which was over 3,200 m (10,500 ft) in the Group One Tenno Sho (Emperor's Cup).

Makybe Diva was named Australian Champion Racehorse of the Year for the 2004/05 season. Along with this, she was also named Australian Champion Stayer and Australian Champion Filly and Mare. A three-quarter brother to Makybe Diva, by Redoute's Choice, was sold in April 2005 for an Australian record price of $2.5 million. Subsequently, named Musket, the colt won his debut at Canterbury in August 2006, and in 2008 won the Gr.2 Shannon Stakes at Rosehill.

=== 2005/2006: Seven-year-old season (Melbourne Cup 3) ===
Resuming racing in August 2005, Makybe Diva won the Group 2 Memsie Stakes first up, before being defeated by a nose in the Dato Tan Chin Nam Stakes at Moonee Valley. Two weeks later, with a run down the outside of the field, Makybe Diva won the Turnbull Stakes over 2,000 m at Flemington. The mare further enhanced her reputation despite being eight horses wide on the home turn, with a comfortable victory in the 2005 Cox Plate, subsequently beating 2006 winner Fields of Omagh.

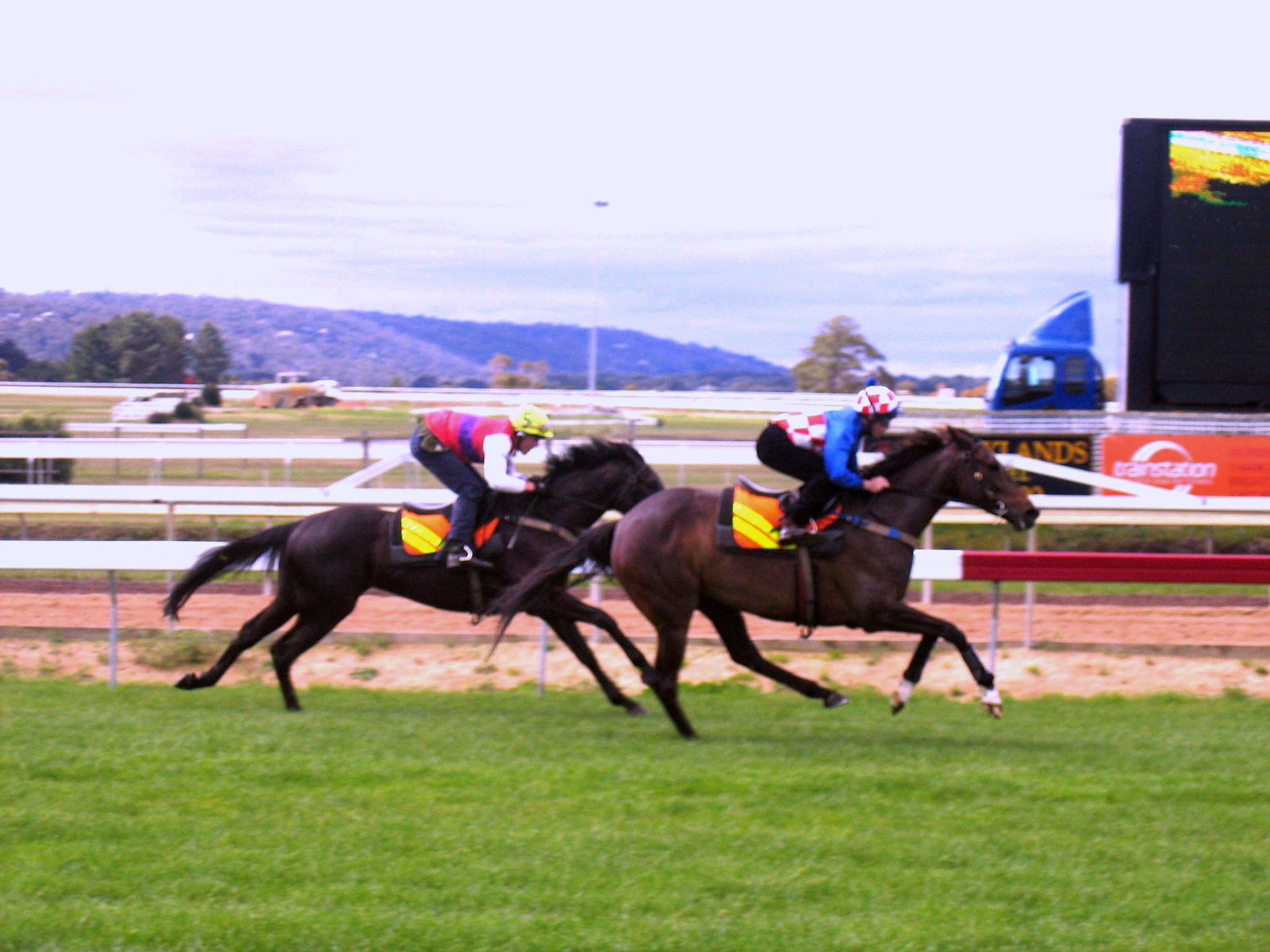
Makybe Diva in September 2005

Prior to the Melbourne Cup, whether Makybe Diva would start was in doubt, after her connections said she would not run if the track was "too firm". After the VRC decided to water the track, however, she was declared a starter. On 1 November 2005, she made history in winning a record third Melbourne Cup. Settling towards the back of the field, she steadily made ground between runners around the home turn, before hitting the lead with around 300 m to go and holding a comfortable 1-1/4-length margin at the finish. Immediately after the race, trainer Lee Freedman said:

Go find the smallest child on this course, and there will be the only example of a person who will live long enough to see that again.

The win was not without controversy, however. Many, including rival trainers, suggested the track watering amounted to bad sportsmanship employed to give Makybe Diva the best chance to win the race. However, the track condition was upgraded to good straight after the Cup, and the winning time of 3:19.18 was consistent with that rating.

Makybe Diva carried 58 kg during the record third Melbourne Cup, 0.5 kg above the weight-for-age scale for a mare in a 3200m race. The last horse to carry more than weight-for-age and win was Rain Lover, who was 1 kg over when he won his second cup in 1969, with 60.5 kg. In 2005, Makybe Diva broke her own weight-carrying record for a mare of 55.5 kg, which she set in 2004, and became the highest-weighted winner of the Cup since Think Big won his second Melbourne Cup with 58.5 kg in 1975. During the presentation of the Melbourne Cup, owner Tony Šantić announced that Makybe Diva would "retire from racing as of today".

At the end of the 2005–06 season, Makybe Diva was named Australian Champion Racehorse of the Year for the second time, becoming just the third horse to win that accolade more than once. She was also named Australian Champion Stayer, winning this award for the third consecutive year, as well as Australian Champion Middle Distance Racehorse.

== Breeding career ==
On 10 August 2006, it was announced that Makybe Diva would be served by Epsom Derby winner Galileo at Coolmore Stud.

At 3:16 on the morning of 17 August 2007, AEST time, Makybe Diva gave birth to her first foal, named Rockstardom, at Coolmore Stud in the Hunter Valley of NSW. Sold for AU$1.5 million as a yearling in 2009, he won two races in 12 starts, earning $26,115 over three years. Rockstardom was gelded and died of a skull fracture in his stall at C. Waller's stables on 26 July 2013.

Makybe Diva was due to be served by Encosta De Lago in the spring of 2007 until the outbreak of equine influenza forced the stud to be quarantined. Owner Tony Šantić sent the Diva to American champion Fusaichi Pegasus, instead. On 20 August 2008, Makybe gave birth to her second foal, a filly by the aforementioned Fusaichi Pegasus. This filly, later named La Dolce Diva, sold at auction for $1.2 million to trainer Mark Kavanagh of Melbourne. Makybe Diva had a colt on 28 August 2009 by Encosta De Lago and was covered by More Than Ready for the 2010 season, but she did not produce a foal in 2010.

Makybe Diva gave birth to her fourth foal, a bay colt by Lonhro, on 16 August 2011 in Victoria. Her fifth foal, born in September 2012, is a colt sired by High Chaparral.

She was retired from breeding in 2019.

== Death ==
Makybe Diva died in Gnarwarre the morning of 28 February 2026, after a sudden, quick bout with colic, a gastrointestinal issue within horses. She was 26.

== Awards ==
In 2006, the inaugural Spirit of Sport Award (for 2005) was given to Makybe Diva and her connections (Lee Freedman, Tony Šantić, and Glen Boss) by the Sport Australia Hall of Fame for her three successive Melbourne Cups. Spirit of Sport Award site

On 4 July 2006, Makybe Diva was inducted into the Australian Racing Hall of Fame.

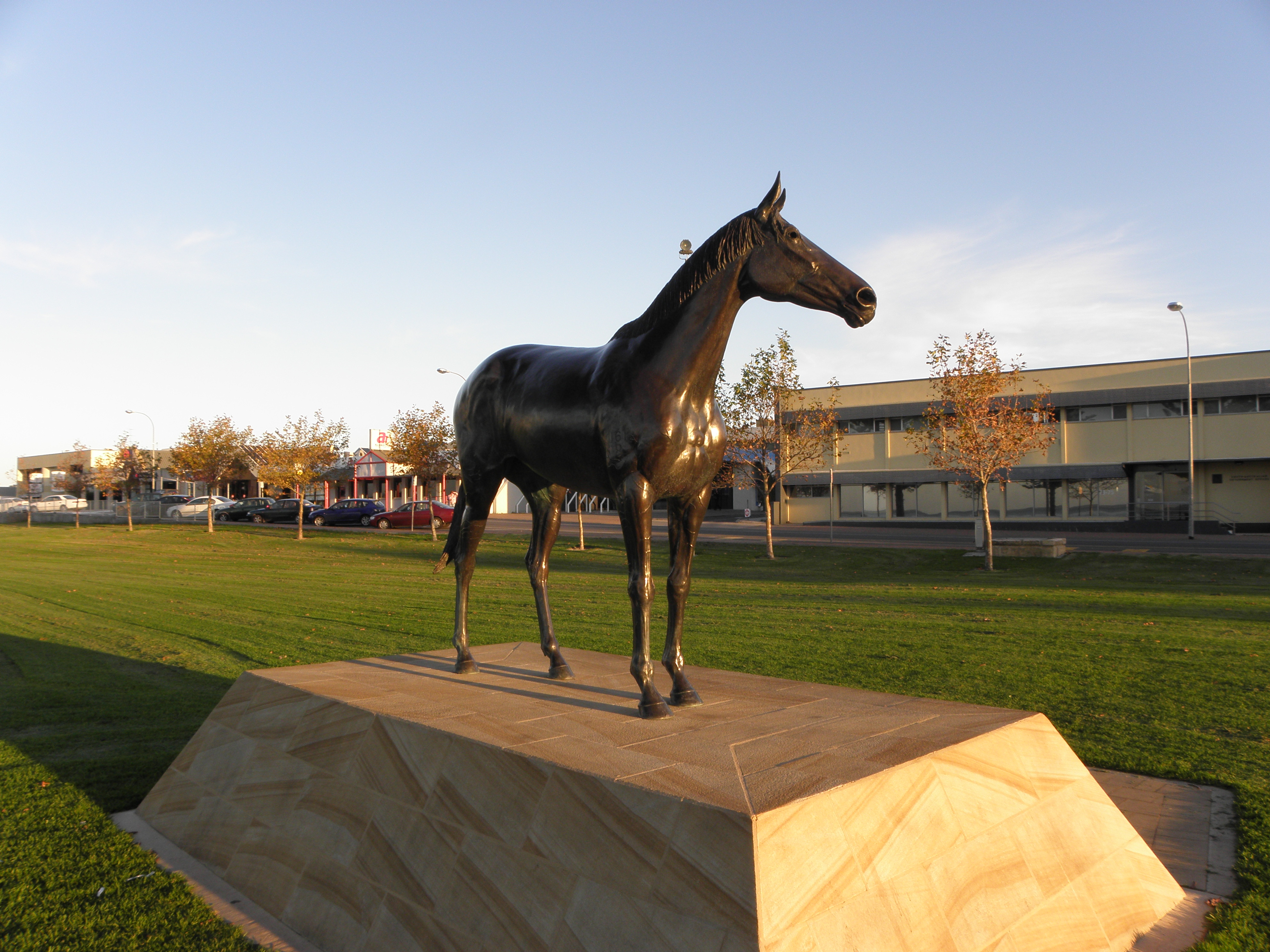
Statue of Makybe Diva at Port Lincoln, South Australia

As announced on 5 August 2006, Makybe Diva has been honoured at Flemington Racecourse with a life-sized bronze statue, in recognition of her historic three Melbourne Cup wins. A life-sized bronze statue was also erected on the foreshore in Šantić's home town of Port Lincoln, South Australia.

Makybe Diva headed the International Federation of Horseracing Authorities ratings for the 2005-06 official end-of-season assessment. She was given a rating of 124, ahead of Electrocutionist, David Junior and Heart's Cry on 123. At a ceremony in Melbourne on 5 September 2010, held in conjunction with the Australian Horse of the Year awards, Makybe Diva was officially inducted into the Australian Racing Hall of Fame.

== Melbourne Cup trophy theft ==
On 16 November 2026 at around 6:30 a.m., it was reported that Makybe Diva's trophies from her three Melbourne Cup wins were stolen from the Flemington Racecourse. The trophies had been put on display for Flemington's annual Spring Racing Carnival. Tony Santic, who had owned the mare, said he was "totally devastated" and asked for the return of the trophies in one piece. It is estimated that each of the three trophies are worth more than A$1 million and contain about 1.69 kg (3.7 lb) of 18-carat gold.

On 19 November 2026, Victoria Police announced the arrest of two individuals in connection with the missing trophies. Chrysovalandis Tassakos and Sama Mirzaagha were charged with numerous offences, including burglary, theft, and dealing with property suspected of being proceeds of crime. Police also alleged that a fourth Melbourne Cup trophy was stolen, along with a 1948 Caulfield Cup trophy. As of the arrest announcement, none of the trophies have been recovered.

== Race record ==
2001/2002: Three-Year-Old Season
Result	Date	Race	Venue	Distance	Weight (kg)	Time	Jockey	Winner/2nd
4th	29 July 2002	3yo Maiden	Benalla	1200m	54.5	1:13.15	F. Alesci	Blues Explosion 1st

2002/2003: Four-Year-Old Season
Result	Date	Race	Venue	Distance	Weight (kg)	Time	Jockey	Winner/2nd
Won	13 August 2002	Maiden	Wangaratta	1600m	55	1:41.70	V. Hall	Sing Us a Tune 2nd
Won	3 September 2002	Class 1	Sale	1700m	55	1:43.97	V. Hall	Zanisa 2nd
Won	17 September 2002	Class 3	Ballarat	2000m	54.5	2:07.15	V. Hall	Our Fireman Sam 2nd
Won	3 October 2002	F & M Handicap	Flemington	2000m	52	2:02.31	Brett Prebble	Little Miss Quick 2nd
Won	30 October 2002	Werribee Cup	Werribee	2000m	51.5	2:03.24	Luke Currie	Aquiver 2nd
Won	9 November 2002	Queen Elizabeth Stakes	Flemington	2500m	52	2:35.78	L. Currie	Spirit of Westbury 2nd
8th	5 April 2003	Open Handicap	Caulfield	1400m	55.5	1:22.52	V. Hall	Karamazou 1st
6th	25 April 2003	Auckland RC Hcp.	Flemington	1600m	56.5	1:37.10	V. Hall	Old Man 1st

2003/2004: Five-Year-Old Season
Result	Date	Race	Venue	Distance	Weight (kg)	Time	Jockey	Winner/2nd
4th	30 August 2003	Noel Rundle Welter	Caulfield	1400m	58.5	1:25.32	L. Currie	C'Est Le Reve 1st
4th	13 September 2003	W H Stock Stakes	Moonee Valley	1600m	55.5	1:36.81	S. Arnold	Sunday Joy 1st
4th	4 October 2003	Turnbull Stakes	Flemington	2000m	56.5	2:04.06	L. Currie	Studebaker 1st
4th	18 October 2003	Caulfield Cup	Caulfield	2400m	51.5	2:25.98	Glen Boss	Mummify 1st
Won	4 November 2003	Melbourne Cup	Flemington	3200m	51	3:19.90	G. Boss	She's Archie 2nd
7th	14 February 2004	Chester Manifold Stakes	Flemington	1400m	59.5	1:21.12	V. Hall	Mr Murphy 1st
3rd	28 February 2004	Carlyon Cup	Caulfield	1600m	56.5	1:36.24	G. Boss	La Sirenuse 1st
6th	8 March 2004	Australian Cup	Flemington	2000m	55.5	2:01.67	G. Boss	Lonhro 1st
3rd	20 March 2004	Ranvet Stakes	Rosehill	2000m	55.5	2:03.22	G. Boss	Sound Action 1st
3rd	3 April 2004	The BMW Stakes	Rosehill	2400m	55.5	2:25.78	G. Boss	Grand Zulu 1st
Won	17 April 2004	Sydney Cup	Randwick	3200m	55.5	3:21.21	G. Boss	Manawa King 2nd

2004/2005: Six-Year-Old Season
Result	Date	Race	Venue	Distance	Weight (kg)	Time	Jockey	Winner/2nd
4th	28 August 2004	Memsie Stakes	Caulfield	1400m	55.5	1:23.02	L. Currie	Regal Roller 1st
2nd	11 September 2004	J F Feehan Stakes	Moonee Valley	1600m	55.5	1:42.50	L. Currie	Delzao 1st
7th	2 October 2004	Turnbull Stakes	Flemington	2000m	56.5	2:00.46	Damien Oliver	Elvstroem 1st
2nd	16 October 2004	Caulfield Cup	Caulfield	2400m	55.5	2:31.37	G. Boss	Elvstroem 1st
Won	2 November 2004	Melbourne Cup	Flemington	3200m	55.5	3:28.55	G. Boss	Vinnie Roe 2nd
7th	12 February 2005	C F Orr Stakes	Caulfield	1400m	55.5	1:22.85	Steven King	Elvstroem 1st
2nd	26 February 2005	St George Stakes	Caulfield	1800m	56.5	1:49.56	G. Boss	Elvstroem 1st
Won	12 March 2005	Australian Cup	Flemington	2000m	55.5	1:58.73	G. Boss	Winning Belle 2nd
Won	19 March 2005	The BMW Stakes	Rosehill	2400m	55.5	2:26.99	G. Boss	Grand Armee 2nd
7th	10 April 2005	April Stakes	Nakayama	2000m	59	2:00.1	G. Boss	Suzuno 1 March
7th	1 May 2005	Tenno Sho (Spring)	Kyoto	3200m	56	3:16.5	G. Boss	Suzuka Mambo 1st

2005/2006: Seven-Year-Old Season
Result	Date	Race	Venue	Distance	Weight (kg)	Time	Jockey	Winner/2nd
Won	27 August 2005	Memsie Stakes	Caulfield	1400m	55.5	1:26.75	S. King	Barely a Moment 2nd
2nd	10 September 2005	J F Feehan Stakes	Moonee Valley	1600m	55.5	1:37.64	G. Boss	Lad of the Manor 1st
Won	1 October 2005	Turnbull Stakes	Flemington	2000m	56.5	2:01.57	G. Boss	Lad of the Manor 2nd
Won	22 October 2005	Cox Plate	Moonee Valley	2040m	55.5	2:09.27	G. Boss	Lotteria 2nd
Won	1 November 2005	Melbourne Cup	Flemington	3200m	58	3:19.79	G. Boss	On a Jeune 2nd

== Pedigree ==
Pedigree of Makybe Diva (GB) (9) (B. m. 1999)
Sire Desert King B. 1994	Danehill b. 1986	Danzig	Northern Dancer
Sire Desert King B. 1994	Danehill b. 1986	Danzig	Pas de Nom
Sire Desert King B. 1994	Danehill b. 1986	Razyana	His Majesty
Sire Desert King B. 1994	Danehill b. 1986	Razyana	Spring Adieu
Sire Desert King B. 1994	Sabaah; Ch. 1988	Nureyev	Northern Dancer
Sire Desert King B. 1994	Sabaah; Ch. 1988	Nureyev	Special
Sire Desert King B. 1994	Sabaah; Ch. 1988	Dish Dash	Bustino
Sire Desert King B. 1994	Sabaah; Ch. 1988	Dish Dash	Loose Cover
Dam Tugela Br. 1995	Riverman; Br. 1969	Never Bend	Nasrullah
Dam Tugela Br. 1995	Riverman; Br. 1969	Never Bend	Lalun
Dam Tugela Br. 1995	Riverman; Br. 1969	River Lady	Prince John
Dam Tugela Br. 1995	Riverman; Br. 1969	River Lady	Nile Lily
Dam Tugela Br. 1995	Rambushka; B. 1986	Roberto	Hail to Reason
Dam Tugela Br. 1995	Rambushka; B. 1986	Roberto	Bramalea
Dam Tugela Br. 1995	Rambushka; B. 1986	Katsura	Northern Dancer
Dam Tugela Br. 1995	Rambushka; B. 1986	Katsura	Noble Fancy (Family: 9-f)

- Makybe Diva is inbred 4 × 4 x 4 to the stallion Northern Dancer, meaning that Northern Dancer appears three times in the fourth generation of her pedigree. In turn, this means she has six great-great-grandsires instead of eight.

== See also ==
- List of racehorses
- List of leading Thoroughbred racehorses
- Repeat winners of horse races
