= Desert King =

Irish Thoroughbred racehorse

- Sire: Danehill (USA)
- Grandsire: Danzig
- Dam: Sabaah
- Damsire: Nureyev
- Sex: Stallion
- Foaled: 1994
- Country: Ireland
- Colour: Bay
- Breeder: Irish National Stud
- Owner: Michael Tabor
- Trainer: Aidan O'Brien
- Record: 12: 5-5-0
- Earnings: £769,854

Major wins
- National Stakes (1996); Tetrarch Stakes (1997); Irish 2,000 Guineas (1997); Irish Derby (1997)
- Last updated on 30 August 2011

Desert King (31 March 1994 – 11 August 2021) was a Thoroughbred racehorse. Desert King won the Irish Derby Stakes and Irish 2,000 Guineas and was the sire of 13 stakes winners with 34 stakes wins including Makybe Diva (GB).

He was a bay son of Danehill (USA) and he was inbred to Northern Dancer in the third generation (3m x 3f).

== Racing career ==
Desert King was trained by Aidan O'Brien, and carried the colours of Michael Tabor. Christy Roche was his jockey for ten of his twelve lifetime starts.

He started on 12 occasions, winning five races, and placing second in another five. His notable victories include the National Stakes, Irish 2,000 Guineas and Irish Derby Stakes. Despite winning the first two legs of the Triple Crown, he was not aimed at the third leg, the Irish St. Leger, due to stamina doubts.

== Stud record ==
This son of Danehill retired to stud in 1998 at Coolmore Stud in Ireland, as the Champion 3yo of his year and winner of over A$1,590,532 in stakes. His progeny include Makybe Diva, Chelsea Rose, Mr Dinos, Desert War, Lachlan River, winner of the Queensland Derby and the multiple Group 1 winning European champion stayer Mr Dinos and Darsalam. Desert King returned to Australia in 2005 as a shuttle stallion after a notable absence of three years. Promoted as a Lynden Park stallions sire, Desert King stood at Bombora Downs in Victoria for A$9,900.00 alongside the Danzig stallion and European champion racehorse Golden Snake. Desert King also stood in Japan at East Stud for the northern hemisphere seasons until 2006. His Northern Hemisphere base was Scarvagh House Stud in Northern Ireland. He was pensioned from stud duties in 2018 and died peacefully in his sleep at Lauriston Park Victoria on 11 August 2021 aged 27.

== Pedigree ==
Pedigree of Desert King (IRE)
| Sire Danehill | Danzig | Northern Dancer | Nearctic |
| Sire Danehill | Danzig | Northern Dancer | Natalma |
| Sire Danehill | Danzig | Pas de Nom | Admiral's Voyage |
| Sire Danehill | Danzig | Pas de Nom | Petitioner |
| Sire Danehill | Razyana | His Majesty | Ribot |
| Sire Danehill | Razyana | His Majesty | Flower Bowl |
| Sire Danehill | Razyana | Spring Adieu | Buckpasser |
| Sire Danehill | Razyana | Spring Adieu | Natalma |
| Dam Sabaah | Nureyev | Northern Dancer | Nearctic |
| Dam Sabaah | Nureyev | Northern Dancer | Natalma |
| Dam Sabaah | Nureyev | Special | Forli |
| Dam Sabaah | Nureyev | Special | Thong |
| Dam Sabaah | Dish Dash | Bustino | Busted |
| Dam Sabaah | Dish Dash | Bustino | Ship Yard |
| Dam Sabaah | Dish Dash | Loose Cover | Venture |
| Dam Sabaah | Dish Dash | Loose Cover | Nymphet |

- Desert King is inbred 3 × 3 to the stallion Northern Dancer. This also means that Desert King is inbred to Nearctic and Natalma 4 × 4, Desert King is also inbred 4 × 4 × 4 to Natalma.
