= Winx (horse) =

Australian-bred Thoroughbred racehorse

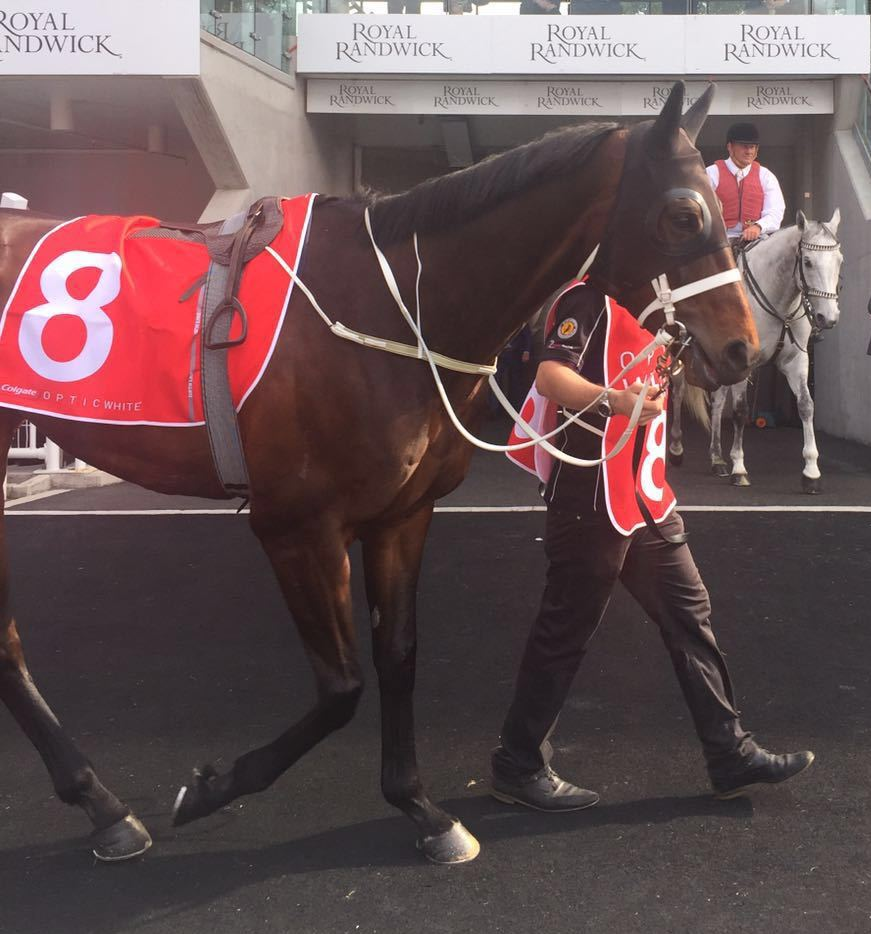
- Sire: Street Cry
- Grandsire: Machiavellian
- Dam: Vegas Showgirl
- Damsire: Al Akbar
- Sex: Mare
- Foaled: 14 September 2011 (age 15); Jerrys Plains, New South Wales, Australia
- Country: Australia
- Colour: Bay
- Breeder: Fairway Thoroughbreds
- Owner: Magic Bloodstock Racing, R G Treweeke & D N Kepitis
- Trainer: Chris Waller
- Jockey: Hugh Bowman
- Record: 43: 37-3-0
- Earnings: A$26,421,176

Major wins
- Furious Stakes (2014); Phar Lap Stakes (2015); Sunshine Coast Guineas (2015); Queensland Oaks (2015); Theo Marks Stakes (2015); Epsom Handicap (2015); W. S. Cox Plate (2015, 2016, 2017, 2018); Apollo Stakes (2016, 2017, 2019); Chipping Norton Stakes (2016, 2017, 2018, 2019); George Ryder Stakes (2016, 2017, 2018, 2019); Doncaster Handicap (2016); Warwick/Winx Stakes (2016, 2017, 2018); George Main Stakes (2016, 2017, 2018); Caulfield Stakes (2016); Queen Elizabeth Stakes (2017, 2018, 2019); Chelmsford Stakes (2017); Turnbull Stakes (2017, 2018)

Awards
- Australian Horse of the Year (2015/6, 2016/7, 2017/8, 2018/9); Australian Champion Middle Distance Racehorse (2015/6, 2016/7, 2017/8, 2018/9); World's Top-Ranked Turf Horse (2016, 2017); World's Best Racehorse – tie (2018); Timeform rating: 134; Secretariat Vox Populi Award (2018)

Honours
- Australian Racing Hall of Fame (2017); Winx Stakes; Australia Post stamp issue Winx Grandstand at Royal Randwick; Statues at Moonee Valley and Rosehill Gardens
- Last updated on 15 May 2019

Winx (foaled 14 September 2011) is a retired champion Australian Thoroughbred racehorse and active broodmare. She won 37 of 43 career starts, including, between May 2015 and her retirement in April 2019, her last 33 races in succession, including 25 Group 1s (a world record), at distances ranging from 1300 metres (roughly 6 1/2 furlongs) to 2200 metres (roughly 11 furlongs). In the World's Best Racehorse Rankings, she was the second-ranked filly or mare in 2015, improving in 2016 to become both the world's top-ranked filly or mare and the world's top-ranked turf horse. She retained this ranking in 2017 and in 2018 was co-ranked as the best horse in the world. In 2017 she was inducted into the Australian Racing Hall of Fame, only the third horse to earn this honour while still in training. Over her career, she earned more than 26 million Australian dollars.

Winx began her racing career with three straight wins but then won only one race in her next seven starts. Towards the end of her three-year-old campaign, she rebounded to win two races in May 2015, including the Group 1 Queensland Oaks, to start her winning streak. As a four-year-old, she was named the 2015/6 Australian Horse of the Year and middle distance champion after a seven race campaign that included wins in the W. S. Cox Plate and Doncaster Mile. In the 2016/7 season, she successfully defended her 2015 Cox Plate win with a commanding eight length victory over rival Hartnell. She completed the season with a win in the Queen Elizabeth Stakes and was again named Horse of the Year.

For the 2017/18 season, she earned her third Horse of the Year honour after recording seven straight wins, including her third victories in the Cox Plate, Chipping Norton and George Ryder and her second win in the Queen Elizabeth. In the 2018/19 season, Winx began her seven-year-old campaign on 18 August in a race renamed in her honour and in doing so extended her winning streak to an Australasian record of 26, since extended to 33. Winx became the first horse in history to win the prestigious Cox Plate four times. She won the 2018 Secretariat Vox Populi Award, the top choice among race fans in a record 60 countries.

She finished her career on 13 April 2019 at Randwick racecourse by winning the Queen Elizabeth Stakes for the third time. She was then retired to be a broodmare.

== Background ==
Winx is a bay mare bred in Australia by John Camilleri's Fairway Thoroughbreds. She was foaled on 14 September 2011 at Coolmore Stud, Jerrys Plains in the Hunter Valley of New South Wales. She was sired by the Irish-bred Street Cry, who won the Dubai World Cup in 2002 before becoming a very successful breeding stallion in North America and Australasia. His other progeny included Zenyatta, Street Sense, Shocking and Whobegotyou. Winx's dam, Vegas Showgirl, was a stakes winner in New Zealand who was bought by Fairway Thoroughbreds in 2008 as a broodmare prospect for A$455,000.

Winx stood and nursed soon after foaling and quickly stood out as "a leggy Elle Macpherson type". She was sold as a yearling for $230,000 at the 2013 Magic Millions Gold Coast sale. She was part of a draft of horses from Coolmore Stud and was selected by Mulcaster Bloodstock (Guy Mulcaster) to be purchased "to a budget" by a partnership of Magic Bloodstock Racing (owned by Peter Tighe and his wife Patty), Richard Treweeke and Debbie Kepitis (daughter of famed owner Bob Ingham). The name "Winx" was inspired by her dam's name "Vegas Showgirl", and a memory of Treweeke that in Las Vegas burlesque shows from the 1970s and 1980s, "men in the front row would wink at the exotic dancers". Winx raced in Magic Bloodstock's silks: dark blue with white epaulettes and a large white "M", and was trained by Chris Waller.

Unlike many elite racehorses, Winx does not have a particularly long stride – her stride was measured at 6.76 metres (22.2 ft) compared to nearly 8.5 metres (28 ft) for Black Caviar and Phar Lap. Rather, her success has been attributed to a "freakish" cadence that allows her to take 14 strides every 5 seconds, compared to 12 for her rivals. "This means she can settle or accelerate at any time during a race", said Dr. Graeme Putt, who has studied the science of racehorse success. "I think this makes her unique."

== Racing career ==
=== 2013/14: two-year-old season ===
After two racecourse trials, Winx made her competitive debut on 4 June 2014 in a maiden race and won over 1100 metres at Warwick Farm Racecourse. Later that month, on her second and final race of the season, she won over 1400 metres at Rosehill Racecourse in Sydney.

=== 2014/15: three-year-old season ===
Winx suffered the only losses of her racing career as a three-year-old, a fact that connections later attributed to her need to grow into herself. "For her first two years in training, physically, she was just catching up with herself", said bloodstock manager Peter O'Brien. "Chris [Waller] managed her beautifully — he never overtaxed her." In ten starts that year, she earned four wins and finished second three times.

Winx recorded her first major success when she won the Group 2 Furious Stakes over 1200 metres at Randwick Racecourse in Sydney on 6 September 2014. She then finished second to First Seal in both the Tea Rose Stakes and the Flight Stakes before being given a summer break.

She finished unplaced twice in February 2015 before winning the Group 2 Phar Lap Stakes against male opponents over 1500 metres at Rosehill on 14 March. Two weeks later at the same track, she was stepped up in distance for the Vinery Stud Stakes against other fillies but finished unplaced behind Fenway. She started 9/5 favourite for the Australian Oaks over 2400 metres at Randwick on 11 April but was beaten by the 16/1 outsider Gust of Wind, the last race before her winning streak began.

After having earned only one win in her last seven starts, Winx was dropped in class for the Group 3 Sunshine Coast Guineas on 16 May. She trailed the large field as they turned for home but finally found racing room and drew off to win by one and three quarter lengths from the colt Ulmann. "At the 1000m I thought 'This is not good.' At the 600m it was even worse. I was in an impossible position", said jockey Larry Cassidy. "I just made the decision to come to the outside. If I was going to get beat, I didn't want it to be because I was on the inside behind horses. That was just breathtaking."

On her final appearance of the season she started odds-on favourite for the Group 1 Queensland Oaks on 30 May at Doomben Racecourse and won by three and a half lengths from Ungrateful Ellen.

=== 2015/16: four-year-old season ===
After running in a trial at Warwick Farm, Winx began her four-year-old campaign on 12 September 2015 by starting favourite for the Group 2 Theo Marks Stakes over 1300 metres at Rosehill. After starting slowly, she moved to the outside of the field and closed rapidly to win by a head from the outsider Sons of John. Jockey James McDonald said, "She took a bit to get going. I just let her flop out and then let her gather momentum."

Three weeks later she contested the 150th running of the Epsom Handicap over 1600 metres at Randwick. Starting favourite against thirteen opponents, she overcame serious interference on the final turn to win by two and a half lengths from the six-year-old gelding Ecuador. Her weight of 57 kilograms (126 lb) was the highest ever carried to victory in the race by a female. Speaking after the race, her trainer Chris Waller commented "For her to pick herself up after that and put herself back in the race before bursting through like she did, it was pretty special. Her winning strike rate separates her from a lot of horses. She overcomes barrier draws, track conditions and distances. She had a long three-year-old year. She has been everywhere and she is still firing. For her to come back as a four-year-old is pretty special."

On 24 October, Winx started favourite for Australia's most prestigious weight-for-age race, the Cox Plate over 2040 metres at Moonee Valley Racecourse. The field included an international element with Highland Reel (Secretariat Stakes) from Ireland, Arod (Diomed Stakes, Summer Mile Stakes) from England and Gailo Chop (Prix Guillaume d'Ornano) from France. The filly raced on the inside rail, broke clear of the field entering the straight and won by four and three quarter lengths from Criterion in a new race and course record time of 2:02.98, breaking Might and Power's 1998 race and course record by more than half a second. After the race, her jockey Hugh Bowman said "She's a group 1 mare, she's a serious racehorse. From the 800, I was very confident".

Winx earned a rating of 123 for the Cox Plate, which placed her in a tie for eighth in the 2015 World's Best Racehorse Rankings. In comparison to other fillies and mares, she ranked only behind Treve and tied for second with Beholder.

After a three and a half month break, Winx returned in autumn for two races at Randwick. On 13 February 2016 she won the Group 2 Apollo Stakes over 1400 metres and was then stepped back up to Group 1 level for the 1600 metre Chipping Norton Stakes two weeks later. Starting the odds-on favourite, she won by a length and a half from Dibayani with Hauraki a length away in third. Bowman, who had ridden many major winners including So You Think, described her as "the best I have had anything to do with."

In the George Ryder Stakes at Rosehill on 19 March, she again won at short odds, beating Kermadec by one and a half lengths. On 2 April, the filly started odds-on favourite for the A$3 million Doncaster Mile at Randwick despite carrying top weight in a fifteen-runner field on unsuitably soft ground. She looked unlikely to obtain a clear run in the straight but broke through in the closing stages to win by two lengths from Happy Clapper. Waller commented, "I'll call her a champion while I can speak. I thought she was beaten at the half-mile. She must have an amazing will to win."

The win in the Doncaster earned Winx a rating of 126 by the International Federation of Horseracing Authorities (IFHA), which tied her for the lead in the April 2016 listing of the World's Best Racehorse rankings with California Chrome. "That's an extraordinarily high figure for a mare", said Racing Victoria's Chief Handicapper Greg Carpenter. "When you think of the great mares of the last decade, only horses like Black Caviar, Treve, Zenyatta, Rachel Alexandra and Danedream have been able to run to figures of 127 and higher."

Winx was voted the Australian Champion Racehorse of the Year for 2015/6, receiving all but one vote. She was also named the champion middle-distance performer.

=== 2016/17: five-year-old season ===
Winx began her next season in the Warwick Stakes over 1400 metres at Randwick on 20 August. She took the lead 300 metres out and drew away to win by three and half lengths from Hartnell. She was entered in the Chelmsford Stakes on 3 September but scratched due to the heavy going. On 17 September, she won the Group I George Main Stakes (also known as the Colgate Optic White Stakes), pushing her lifetime earnings past the A$7,000,000 mark. She also extended her winning streak to 11, tying her with Kingston Town.

On 8 October, Winx faced only two rivals in the Caulfield Stakes. Black Heart Bart set the early pace, then Winx moved alongside on the turn while on the wrong lead. In the final 200m (one furlong), she switched to the right lead and drew off.

On 22 October, Winx faced a stiffer challenge in her attempt to defend her 2015 win in the Cox Plate. Her leading rival was Hartnell, whose form had significantly improved since the two met in the Warwick, making him the early favourite for the Melbourne Cup. The field also included several other Group One winners such as Black Heart Bart, Hauraki, Lucia Valentina and Yankee Rose. Bowman placed Winx to the outside of Hartnell during the early running then released her with 600 metres remaining. Winx moved to a two length lead at the top of the straight and continued to draw away, eventually winning by a record eight lengths from Hartnell. It was her thirteenth consecutive win, including nine Group One victories, and took her past Black Caviar and So You Think in career earnings. "We were a long way away but we weren't disgraced", said David Vandyke, trainer of Yankee Rose who finished third. "We can say we got beaten by Winx."

Timeform increased her rating to 133p, "with the possibility of even better to come". The IFHA gave her an initial rating of 130, subsequently increased to 132, making her both the top-ranked filly/mare and top-ranked turf horse in the world for 2016. The 132 rating is tied with Black Caviar as the highest rating ever assigned to a filly or mare.

When asked what set Winx apart from other competitors, Bowman said, "She is so well-balanced, light on her feet, and she can accelerate very quickly. But it is her will-to-win and her determination that makes her so good. I’ve never ridden a horse like her."

Winx was given some time off, then returned to training in January 2017. Her next start was the Apollo Stakes at Randwick, originally scheduled for 11 February but delayed to 13 February due to extreme heat in the Sydney area. Winx broke poorly, then settled in mid pack behind a fast early pace. She swung out three-wide leaving the far turn, then pulled away in the straight to defeat Hartnell by two lengths. "My only worry going into the race was if there was no tempo but that went at a good gallop and that really helped", said Bowman. "Chris [Waller] and his team have done a great job to have her ready after so long away from the races and it's a privilege to be part of this."

On 25 February, Winx returned in the Chipping Norton Stakes. Originally at odds of 1.10, she drifted out slightly to 1.22 because of the heavy going. With the rain still falling shortly before the race, Waller walked the course and determined that it was safe for Winx to run. "I was so close to scratching her but we made the right decision. I walked the track before the race and it looked pretty good to me. It was safe and that was my main concern", he said. Although her time was slow, Winx won with ease by two lengths over longshot Lasqueti Spirit. Hartnell did not handle the track and was well back in eighth. "Today the conditions were fair and even", said Bowman, "yeah sure it is wet but everyone is getting their chance and it is just a case of whether your horse can cope with the surface or not. Clearly this mare can."

The victory extended Winx's winning streak to fifteen, surpassing Phar Lap's win streak of fourteen and tying her with Carbine and Bernborough. It was her tenth Group One win and the winner's purse took her earnings to A$9.8 million, third on the Australian all-time list behind Makybe Diva and Sunline.

On 18 March, Winx was entered in the George Ryder Stakes at a distance of 1500 metres over another rain-soaked course. Her six rivals included sprint champion Chautauqua and Group I winner Le Romain, who was expected to relish the heavy going. Winx settled near the back of the pack after an awkward break, then started making up ground on the outside as they moved around the turn. Once they entered the straight, Winx drew off easily and won by 7 1/4 lengths from Le Romain, with Chautauqua in third. Her share of the purse took her earnings over the A$10 million mark. Timeform called the performance "her best yet", assigning a rating of 134.

Winx made her final start of the autumn on 8 April at Royal Randwick in the Queen Elizabeth Stakes, the world's most valuable 2000 metre turf race with a purse of A$4 million. In the early running, she was positioned on the outside of the second group of runners, a few lengths behind the leading group that included Hartnell, who made his move as they rounded the turn. Winx responded as they entered the straight, "accelerating away" to win by 5 1/4 lengths from Hartnell with Sense of Occasion in third.

"I don't think you see the best of her when it is that sort of race", said Bowman, speaking of the slow pace. "I mean she is obviously still good, she wheeled passed them at the top of the straight and she still let down. But I honestly I think when she gets in a high pressure race, when there is a lot of pace from the start like there was in last year's Cox Plate, that's when you see the best of her."

The IFHA assigned a rating of 132 for the race, matching her personal best rating from the 2016 Cox Plate. In the 2017 rankings, Winx once again ranked second behind Arrogate on the World's Best Racehorse ratings, and was the top-rated turf horse and female horse.

Winx earned her second Australian Champion Racehorse of the Year award in a ceremony held on 8 October, becoming only the fourth mare to win this honour twice (Sunline, Makybe Diva and Black Caviar being the others). She also repeated as middle distance champion. Bowman and Waller were also honoured as leading Group 1 jockey and trainer respectively.

=== 2017/18: six-year-old season ===
On 19 August 2017, Winx opened up her six-year-old campaign with a second successive win in the Group 2 Warwick Stakes to extend her winning streak to 18 races and her prize money above $13M. The race did not go to plan, however, as she was left at the barriers, missing the start by some four lengths. Her stablemate Foxplay kicked clear into the straight, and Hugh Bowman on Winx had to ease her into the race. Coming from last on the turn and still last at the 300m mark, she lengthened stride and finished fast to run Foxplay down right on the line to win by a half neck in a "remarkable" effort.

Concerned by the poor start in the Warwick, Waller decided to add ear muffs to Winx's racing equipment to help her relax – she had always worn them during trackwork but previously had them removed in the parade ring before racing. She made her next start on 2 September in the Chelmsford Stakes at Randwick. This time she broke well and settled near the front of the main pack. On the lead, Red Excitement set a quick pace and opened up a large lead of five lengths to the second place horse, who in turn was over five lengths in front of Winx. Turning into the straight, Winx moved into second but still had five lengths to make up on Red Excitement with 450m remaining. At the 200m mark, she still had three lengths to make up when Bowman dropped the whip. Under a hand ride, Winx continued to close ground and pulled clear in the final strides to win by a length.

"At the top of the straight I wasn't worried last start, but today I really was", said Bowman. "What she did today was incredible, I mean everything she does is incredible, but I'm lost for words... He (Red Excitement) certainly made a race of it. He left no stone unturned. I was comfortable in the first quarter of the race but I could see what was happening so I started to make my way a bit closer from the 900-metre mark but I still had to stay within myself... I'm concentrating on just keeping her balanced but when she hit the afterburners at the 150-metre mark today, I just can't explain the feeling."

On 16 September, Winx was entered in the George Main Stakes where she was installed as the heavy favorite. She broke well but soon settled near the back of the pack, well off the fast pace set by Red Excitement. She was not moving well and Bowman struck her with the whip with 600 metres remaining. Rounding into the straight, she was still near the rear of the field, some eight lengths behind Red Excitement. From mid-pack, Happy Clapper made his move near the top of the straight and took command of the race. Winx seemed slow to respond but then picked up her stride in mid stretch and swept to the lead, then eased off slightly near the wire to win by 1 1/4 lengths. Her time for the 1600-metre distance was a race record of 1:33.65.

Winx made her first start at Flemington Racecourse on 7 October in the Turnbull Stakes, causing "commuter chaos" as her fans headed to the track. Feeling that Winx had regained her focus at the start, Waller removed the ear muffs from her equipment. Winx broke well and settled in fifth place during the early running, then swung wide and started making up ground on the turn. With 400m remaining, the crowd started clapping as she accelerated past her rivals. Despite never being urged and easing up before the wire, Winx completed the final 400m in 22.71 seconds to win by 6 1/2 lengths.

On 28 October, Winx extended her winning streak to 22 when she won the Cox Plate for the third time, matching Kingston Town's achievement. Before a sell out crowd, Winx broke well and raced in mid pack before starting her move on the final turn. She struck the lead at the head of the straight and then withstood a late run from Humidor to win by half a length. Her time of 2:02.94 bettered her own race and course record for 2040m set in 2015. It was her fifteenth Group 1 win, tying her with Black Caviar's Australian record. The winner's share of the A$3 million purse made her the leading prize money earner in Australian racing history.

"It wasn't an easy victory, she had to be good to fight Humidor", said Waller. "But you never expect these races to be easy. In fact, you never expect to win when you come to these races. That was a fair-dinkum Cox Plate out there today."

Winx was given a layoff, then was originally scheduled to return to racing in February 2018 in the Apollo Stakes. However, Bowman had been suspended for a previous racing infraction so Waller decided to delay Winx's return until Bowman would be available to ride her. On 3 March, Winx was entered in the Chipping Norton Stakes at Randwick, facing seven rivals including Victoria Derby winner Prized Icon. She broke slowly and settled near the pack of the pack, then swung wide around the turn while gradually improving her position. Entering the straight, she moved to the lead and pulled away for a seven length victory. The win was her sixteenth at the Group 1 level, moving her by Black Caviar for the Australian record and tied with John Henry for the world record for Group / Grade 1 victories on the flat.

Bowman commented that the impressive win was due at least in part to the mare's preference for soft going, believing she was not at her best over the firm tracks she had encountered in four of her previous five wins. "She still performed at a high level every time but she is just not as comfortable", he said. "The one wet track she did have was at Flemington and we saw what she did there in the Turnbull. A little bit of cut here this afternoon and we couldn't have asked for a better return to racing."

On 24 March, Winx won the George Ryder Stakes for the third time, extending her winning streak to 24 – just shy of Black Caviar's Australian record of 25. It was also her seventeenth Group 1 win, breaking the world record she had previously shared with John Henry. In what Bowman called a tactical race, Winx settled near the back of the six-horse field then started to make up ground around the turn. Invincible Gem led early, stalked by Happy Clapper. Winx unleashed her run with 300m remaining, and gradually pulled away to win by three-quarters of a length from Happy Clapper.

After the George Ryder, Winx's connections discussed whether the mare would be shipped to England in June for the Royal Ascot racing festival. They ultimately decided against it as Waller was concerned about putting the mare through the stress of travel and quarantine for just one or two races. Waller had a small amount of synthetic filler applied to Winx's near (left) hind hoof. The filler is used when a horse's hoof wall becomes brittle, usually towards the end of the racing season. It provides the farrier with more surface area for nailing on horseshoes.

On 14 April, Winx made her last start of the season in the Queen Elizabeth Stakes. Bowman settled the mare in last place, with Gailo Chop setting a comfortable pace up front. With 800m remaining in the race, Winx moved alongside Happy Clapper at the back of the pack while Japanese runner Ambitious pushed Gailo Chop for the lead. As the field rounded the turn, Happy Clapper made his move along the rail while Winx moved far wide for racing room. She accelerated and quickly closed ground on Gailo Chop then drew clear to win by 3 3/4 lengths. The win was her 25th in a row, tying her with Black Caviar for the Australian record. Waller commented, "We will never know how good she is because she just had the best horses in Australia take her on and beat them like that."

The win earned Winx a rating of 130, making her the top-rated horse in the world in the May 2018 update of the World's Best Racehorse Rankings. She also became only the second horse after Black Caviar to post a rating of at least 130 in three consecutive years.

Winx was turned out for a six-week spell and then resumed training with a goal to win her fourth Cox Plate.

On 4 October 2018, Winx was awarded the Australian Racehorse of the Year title for the 2017/2018 season, her third such title in a row. She also repeated as Australian champion middle-distance horse.

=== 2018/19: seven-year-old season ===
Winx made the first start of her seven-year-old campaign on 18 August 2018 in the Winx Stakes, which had been known as the Warwick Stakes before being renamed in her honour. Now a Group 1 event with a purse of $500,000, the race attracted a field of 11 including Kementari (Randwick Guineas), the only other horse under 10–1. Winx attracted several large bets including one for $140,000. She settled near the back of the field after breaking evenly, then improved her position around the turn to mid-pack. She swung wide and entered the straight beside Kementari, who was unable to match her acceleration and could only finish fourth. Winx drew away from the field and won eased up by two lengths over Invictus Prince.

Despite the comfortable win, her connections admitted to being worried at the top of the straight. Bowman pointed out that the mare had not run recently at the sprint distance of 1,400 metres (7.0 furlongs), and she had had trouble keeping up with the early pace. "When she balanced up and saw the winning post, what can I say", he said. "She is incredible."

Waller commented that instead of losing a step with age, Winx was possibly still improving. Chief steward Marc van Gestel agreed. "She was so dominant and obviously she is getting better. She looked amazing and will improve off this run. I think they will be chasing her for the rest of the spring."

Winx established several milestones in winning the race. She set an Australasian record by extending her winning streak to 26, bypassing Black Caviar who won 25 races in an undefeated career. The two longest winning streaks are by Camarero (56 successive wins in restricted company in Puerto Rico) and Hungarian mare Kincsem (54 wins while undefeated). Winx became the first mare to win three renewals of the Warwick/Winx Stakes, and only the third horse overall (Kingston Town and Limerick being the others). She also extended her world record to 19 Group 1 wins, while becoming the first seven-year-old mare to win a Group 1 since Makybe Diva.

On 15 September, Winx won the George Main Stakes for the third time, extending her win streak to 27 and her Group 1 win count to 20. The favourite in a field of seven, she (as usual) galloped near the back of the pack early then started her move with 600m remaining before accelerating as they entered the straight. For several strides, she failed to make up ground on Le Romain, who had accelerated at roughly the same time. Winx then picked up her stride rate and drew clear, winning by four lengths.

Bowman said that Winx now knows what she needs to do to win. "Le Romain ran a hell of a race and at the corner, I didn't feel in danger, but I didn't feel like she was going to be as dominant as she usually is", he said. "But when that turbo kicked into gear at the 250 metres it was all over."

Winx then travelled to Melbourne to enter the Turnbull Stakes at Flemington on 6 October. Her main rivals in the field of ten were Youngstar (winner of the Queensland Oaks) and Grunt (with two Group 1 wins). Winx settled at the back of the pack where she became boxed in by horses in front and to her outside. The early pace was slow, meaning the field remained tightly packed. As they entered the straight, the pace picked up but Winx was still in ninth place and lacked racing room. Bowman remained calm, waiting for a gap to open. When it did, Winx accelerated through and rapidly made up ground, then moved by Youngstar to win by three-quarters of a length.

The fractional times for the race were noteworthy: after running the first 800m in 50.82 seconds, Winx completed the last 800m in 43.98 seconds, a difference of roughly 40 lengths. She ran the final 200m in an exceptional time of 10.87 seconds, reaching a speed of over 70 km/h. Waller credited the long straight of Flemington for allowing the mare to "get through her gears".

On 27 October, Winx was entered in the Cox Plate against seven other horses, including multiple Group 1 winner Benbatl from Britain and old rival Humidor, who had finished just behind Winx in the 2017 running of the race. This time, Winx broke well and stayed in close contact with the leading group until the pace picked up, at which time she settled into fifth place. Rounding the tight final turn into the short home straight at Moonee Valley, Benbatl made his move to take the lead. Winx responded by swinging wide and then drew off to win by two lengths over Benbatl, with Humidor closing late to finish third.

Waller had been somewhat concerned in the early part of the race, worried about her possibly being forced too wide or being too far back on a track that had not proved favourable to closers in earlier races. "But it all worked out, she got cover, the speed wasn't too strong", he said. "She had them all covered a long way from home."

After the Cox Plate, Winx was turned out for a spell while her connections considered if she should be retired. "You've got to be realistic and none of us are as effective as we get older", said Waller. "We have to respect Winx and make sure she is seen at her very best for as long as she can and not overstep the mark." Because she continued to train well, they announced that she would race up to four more times, with the Queen Elizabeth Stakes as her last race.

On 16 February, Winx (10-1 on) won the Group 2 Apollo Stakes for a record third time, beating second favourite Happy Clapper (10-1) by over two lengths and stablemate Egg Tart into third place. It was her 30th consecutive win. The time of 1:20.88 for 1400m (roughly 7 furlongs) broke the existing race record and was just short of Trapeze Artist's track record of 1:20:33.

On 2 March, Winx won the Group 1 Chipping Norton Stakes. For the first time in his career, Happy Clapper took the lead early and held it for most of the race, with a margin over Winx of 7 lengths at the 700m mark. It looked as though he might pull off an upset, but he was chased down late in the straight by Winx and ran second to her again. "I think today when you watch the replay, at the 700m mark you would have thought she was out of business", said Bowman. "Another jockey may have thought that, but I knew when I balanced up she was going to rally. There was no way Happy Clapper could sustain that speed, and I knew that when she balanced up, she would have the energy required to reel him in."

It was the 31st consecutive win for Winx, her 23rd Group 1 win, and her fourth Chipping Norton win. Although she had held the record for the number of Group 1 wins on the flat since March 2018, the 23 Group 1 wins moved Winx past Hurricane Fly, a hurdler, for the worldwide record from Group/Grade 1 wins regardless of race format.

On 23 March, Winx won the George Ryder Stakes over heavy ground in what was expected to be her final start at Rosehill; her home and training track. All seven rivals had never raced her and none was given a serious chance by the bettors. Winx was bet down to her lowest-ever odds of 1.04 (1-25 in European and North American usage) after several large bets were placed on her, including one for $345,000. She settled at the back of the pack while Bowman steered her wide. Still in seventh with 300m remaining, she accelerated in the straight and won handily by 3 1/2 lengths. "Although it's a beautiful afternoon", noted Bowman, "the ground is significantly testing [classified a "Heavy 8"], and it was quite similar to how it was two years ago when she annihilated Le Romain. Because she works on the track she is very comfortable and has a lot of confidence on it. I think that helps her to perform."

Winx triumphed in her last-ever start in the Queen Elizabeth Stakes on 13 April 2019, starting in the outside barrier and scoring a third successive victory, which matched the feats of Carbine (1889-91) and David (1921-3). The win increased her earnings to over A$26 million, a world record when using the methodology of the International Racing Bureau, which converts international earnings during a given year to British pounds using the currency exchange rate at the beginning of that year. Because exchange rates can fluctuate widely, different methods may result in different rankings.

== Racing summary ==
The following form is based on information available on Racing.com

Date	Distance (Condition)	Race	Class	Course	Field	Odds (Favourite)	Finish	Winning Time (Note: Official time of winning horse. The time written in grey indicates the winning time that doesn't belong to Winx.)	Winning (Losing) Margin	Jockey	Winner (2nd Place)
2013-14 season – Two-year-old season
4 Jun 2014	Turf 1100 m (Good)	Ibis Milano Restaurant Handicap		Warwick Farm	10	5.00 (3rd)	1st	1:03.79	3/4 length	Jason Collett	(Felines)
28 Jun 2014	Turf 1400 m (Good)	TAB Early Quaddie Handicap		Rosehill	6	1.45 (1st)	1st	1:23.72	1 1/2 lengths	Jason Collett	(Inz'n'out)
2014-15 season – Three-year-old season
6 Sep 2014	Turf 1200 m (Heavy)	Furious Stakes	G2	Randwick	6	6.50 (3rd)	1st	1:11.99	2 3/4 lengths	Hugh Bowman	(Alpha Miss)
20 Sep 2014	Turf 1400 m (Good)	Tea Rose Stakes	G2	Randwick	7	1.80 (1st)	2nd	1:22.83	(3/4 length)	Jason Collett	First Seal
4 Oct 2014	Turf 1600 m (Good)	Flight Stakes	G1	Randwick	7	2.70 (2nd)	2nd	1:34.71	(3 lengths)	Hugh Bowman	First Seal
14 Feb 2015	Turf 1200 m (Good)	Light Fingers Stakes	G2	Randwick	11	5.00 (3rd)	7th	1:09.48	(3 lengths)	Jason Collett	Adrift
28 Feb 2015	Turf 1400 m (Soft)	Surround Stakes	G2	Warwick Farm	12	9.00 (3rd)	5th	1:22.93	(4 3/4 lengths)	Jason Collett	First Seal
14 Mar 2015	Turf 1500 m (Good)	Phar Lap Stakes	G2	Rosehill	8	2.45 (1st)	1st	1:30.26	1 3/4 lengths	Tommy Berry	(Hauraki)
28 Mar 2015	Turf 2000 m (Good)	Vinery Stud Stakes	G1	Rosehill	14	5.50 (2nd)	5th	2:03.27	(2 lengths)	Tommy Berry	Fenway
11 Apr 2015	Turf 2400 m (Soft)	Australian Oaks	G1	Randwick	10	2.80 (1st)	2nd	2:32.40	(2 1/2 lengths)	Joao Moreira	Gust of Wind
16 May 2015	Turf 1600 m (Good)	Sunshine Coast Guineas	G3	Corbould Park	18	2.60 (1st)	1st	1:36.19	1 3/4 lengths	Larry Cassidy	(Ulmann)
30 May 2015	Turf 2200 m (Good)	Queensland Oaks	G1	Doomben	16	1.95 (1st)	1st	2:14.09	3 1/2 lengths	Hugh Bowman	(Ungrateful Ellen)
2015-16 season – Four-year-old season
12 Sep 2015	Turf 1300 m (Good)	Theo Marks Stakes	G2	Rosehill	14	3.40 (1st)	1st	1:15.77	head	James McDonald	(Sons of John)
3 Oct 2015	Turf 1600 m (Good)	Epsom Handicap	G1	Randwick	14	3.10 (1st)	1st	1:34.58	2 1/4 lengths	Hugh Bowman	(Ecuador)
24 Oct 2015	Turf 2040 m (Good)	W. S. Cox Plate	G1	Moonee Valley	14	4.60 (1st)	1st	R2:02.98	4 3/4 lengths	Hugh Bowman	(Criterion)
13 Feb 2016	Turf 1400 m (Good)	Apollo Stakes	G2	Randwick	11	1.60 (1st)	1st	1:22.03	1 length	Hugh Bowman	(Solicit)
27 Feb 2016	Turf 1600 m (Good)	Chipping Norton Stakes	G1	Randwick	12	1.35 (1st)	1st	1:33.92	1 1/2 lengths	Hugh Bowman	(Dibayani)
19 Mar 2016	Turf 1500 m (Good)	George Ryder Stakes	G1	Rosehill	8	1.90 (1st)	1st	1:28.70	1 1/2 lengths	Hugh Bowman	(Kermadec)
2 Apr 2016	Turf 1600 m (Soft)	Doncaster Mile	G1	Randwick	15	1.80 (1st)	1st	1:35.27	2 lengths	Hugh Bowman	(Happy Clapper)
2016-17 season – Five-year-old season
20 Aug 2016	Turf 1400 m (Good)	Warwick Stakes	G2	Randwick	7	1.24 (1st)	1st	1:23.83	3 1/2 lengths	Hugh Bowman	(Hartnell)
17 Sep 2016	Turf 1600 m (Good)	Colgate Optic White Stakes	G1	Randwick	6	1.09 (1st)	1st	1:36.18	1 1/4 lengths	Hugh Bowman	(Hauraki)
8 Oct 2016	Turf 2000 m (Good)	Caulfield Stakes	G1	Caulfield	3	1.24 (1st)	1st	2:03.42	2 lengths	Hugh Bowman	(Black Heart Bart)
22 Oct 2016	Turf 2040 m (Soft)	W. S. Cox Plate	G1	Moonee Valley	10	1.80 (1st)	1st	2:06.35	8 lengths	Hugh Bowman	(Hartnell)
13 Feb 2017	Turf 1400 m (Good)	Apollo Stakes	G2	Randwick	12	1.14 (1st)	1st	1:22.57	2 3/4 lengths	Hugh Bowman	(Hartnell)
25 Feb 2017	Turf 1600 m (Heavy)	Chipping Norton Stakes	G1	Randwick	10	1.22 (1st)	1st	1:40.37	2 lengths	Hugh Bowman	(Lasqueti Spirit)
18 Mar 2017	Turf 1500 m (Heavy)	George Ryder Stakes	G1	Rosehill	7	1.26 (1st)	1st	1:34.87	7 1/4 lengths	Hugh Bowman	(Le Romain)
8 Apr 2017	Turf 2000 m (Soft)	Queen Elizabeth Stakes	G1	Randwick	9	1.12 (1st)	1st	2:07.22	5 1/4 lengths	Hugh Bowman	(Hartnell)
2017-18 season – Six-year-old season
19 Aug 2017	Turf 1400 m (Good)	Warwick Stakes	G2	Randwick	8	1.10 (1st)	1st	1:21.87	head	Hugh Bowman	(Foxplay)
2 Sep 2017	Turf 1600 m (Good)	Chelmsford Stakes	G2	Randwick	12	1.09 (1st)	1st	1:34.11	1 length	Hugh Bowman	(Red Excitement)
16 Sep 2017	Turf 1600 m (Good)	Colgate Optic White Stakes	G1	Randwick	8	1.12 (1st)	1st	R1:33.65	1 1/4 lengths	Hugh Bowman	(Happy Clapper)
7 Oct 2017	Turf 2000 m (Good)	Turnbull Stakes	G1	Flemington	7	1.20 (1st)	1st	2:02.07	6 1/2 lengths	Hugh Bowman	(Ventura Storm)
28 Oct 2017	Turf 2040 m (Good)	W. S. Cox Plate	G1	Moonee Valley	8	1.18 (1st)	1st	R2:02.94	1/2 length	Hugh Bowman	(Humidor)
3 Mar 2018	Turf 1600 m (Soft)	Chipping Norton Stakes	G1	Randwick	9	1.09 (1st)	1st	1:34.92	7 lengths	Hugh Bowman	(Prized Icon)
24 Mar 2018	Turf 1500 m (Soft)	George Ryder Stakes	G1	Rosehill	6	1.16 (1st)	1st	1:31.48	3/4 length	Hugh Bowman	(Happy Clapper)
14 Apr 2018	Turf 2000 m (Good)	Queen Elizabeth Stakes	G1	Randwick	10	1.24 (1st)	1st	2:01.65	3 3/4 lengths	Hugh Bowman	(Gailo Chop)
2018-19 season – Seven-year-old season
18 Aug 2018	Turf 1400 m (Good)	Winx Stakes	G1	Randwick	11	1.24 (1st)	1st	1:22.50	2 lengths	Hugh Bowman	(Invictus Prince)
15 Sep 2018	Turf 1600 m (Good)	Colgate Optic White Stakes	G1	Randwick	7	1.10 (1st)	1st	1:34.21	4 lengths	Hugh Bowman	(Le Romain)
6 Oct 2018	Turf 2000 m (Good)	Turnbull Stakes	G1	Flemington	10	1.10 (1st)	1st	2:01.60	1 length	Hugh Bowman	(Youngstar)
27 Oct 2018	Turf 2040 m (Good)	W. S. Cox Plate	G1	Moonee Valley	8	1.24 (1st)	1st	2:03.47	2 lengths	Hugh Bowman	(Benbatl)
16 Feb 2019	Turf 1400 m (Good)	Apollo Stakes	G2	Randwick	8	1.10 (1st)	1st	R1:20.88	2 1/4 lengths	Hugh Bowman	(Happy Clapper)
2 Mar 2019	Turf 1600 m (Good)	Chipping Norton Stakes	G1	Randwick	7	1.08 (1st)	1st	1:33.27	1 3/4 lengths	Hugh Bowman	(Happy Clapper)
23 Mar 2019	Turf 1500 m (Heavy)	George Ryder Stakes	G1	Rosehill	8	1.05 (1st)	1st	1:32.20	3 1/2 lengths	Hugh Bowman	(Brutal)
13 Apr 2019	Turf 2000 m (Good)	Queen Elizabeth Stakes	G1	Randwick	9	1.06 (1st)	1st	2:02.54	1 1/2 lengths	Hugh Bowman	(Kluger)

- R in the chart and the time written in red indicates the horse finished in record time.

== Honours ==
On 17 May 2017, it was announced that Winx would be inducted into the Australian Racing Hall of Fame, becoming only the third horse after Sunline and Black Caviar to be so honored while still in training. Coincidentally all three are mares.

The Australian Turf Club announced on 25 October 2017 that the Warwick Stakes, which Winx won in both 2016 and 2017, would be renamed in her honour. Previously a Group 2 race, it was upgraded to Group 1 status after Winx's 2017 win. On 18 August 2018, Winx won this race and become only the second horse in history (after Black Caviar) to win a race named in its honour. After her win in the Winx, Australia Post announced the release of a stamp issue in her honour, including a 26 stamp pack commemorating each race in her win streak up to that time.

On 2 December 2018, it was announced that Winx had won the 2018 Secretariat Vox Populi Award, earning top votes from online racing fans in a record 60 countries. "The fact that both the American public and voters abroad were not limited by international borders is a wonderful testament to the growth of the award and the winner's global appeal", said Kate Chenery Tweedy, the daughter of the award's founder Penny Chenery. "Winx represents everything Mom envisioned when she created this award and reaffirms her notion that a beloved horse will captivate fans and draw interest to the sport no matter where they race."

In the 2018 World's Best Racehorse Rankings, Winx was named joint best racehorse in the world alongside Cracksman with a rating of 130. In early April 2019 she was again rated atop the Longines World's Best Racehorse rankings. On the back of her Apollo and Chipping Norton Stakes wins she rated at 125, equal with Hong Kong-based Beauty Generation and the USA's City of Light.

In May 2019, it was announced that the new grand stand currently being built at Randwick Racecourse would be named the Winx Stand in her honour. It will open in early 2022. On 24 October 2020, a statue by Louis Laumen showing her winning her fourth Cox Plate was unveiled at Moonee Valley Racecourse.

In October 2019, Winx was awarded the Sport Australia Hall of Fame 'Spirit of Sport Award'. She joined Makybe Diva and Black Caviar in winning this prestigious award.

In March 2021, the Australian Turf Club unveiled a bronze statue, created by sculptor Tanya Bartlett, at Rosehill Gardens. The statue captures Winx on the way back to the winning enclosure with Bowman giving his signature "she's apples" salute to the crowd. The statue is located in a newly landscaped garden inside the main spectator entrance at the racecourse. Weighing about 800 kg, the statue was scaled at 110 per cent height and length of the mare. "I was hoping the statue told the story for what it was," said Waller, "and when I saw it, it did. To see that power, that dominance, that arrogance she had post-race and in the final parts of her race... it’s very special.

== Retirement ==
Winx was retired to broodmare duty for the 2019 breeding season, which in Australia begins in September. On 24 June 2019, her connections announced that her first mating would be with I Am Invincible. On October 13, 2020, it was announced that Winx had lost her foal (a filly) being stillborn.

After missing a breeding season the following year to give her time to recover and get over the tragedy, it was announced in late 2021 that Winx was in foal to the stallion Pierro. She foaled a filly on the evening of 7 October. On 8 April 2024, this foal, "Quinceanera", sold for a record $10 million (AUD) at the Inglis Australian Easter Yearling Sale. The winning bidder was Winx's part-owner Debbie Kepitis (Woppitt Bloodstock). The price was a world record for a filly and an Australian yearling record.

A second foal, a colt sired by Snitzel, born in November 2024 was withdrawn from the Inglis Easter Yearling Sale in March 2026 after suffering a minor paddock accident and sent to recovery.

A third foal, a filly sired by Too Darn Hot, was born on September 22, 2026, at Coolmore Stud.

== Pedigree ==
Pedigree of Winx (AUS), bay mare, 2011
Sire Street Cry (IRE) 1998	Machiavellian (USA); 1987	Mr. Prospector	Raise a Native
Sire Street Cry (IRE) 1998	Machiavellian (USA); 1987	Mr. Prospector	Gold Digger
Sire Street Cry (IRE) 1998	Machiavellian (USA); 1987	Coup de Folie	Halo
Sire Street Cry (IRE) 1998	Machiavellian (USA); 1987	Coup de Folie	Raise The Standard
Sire Street Cry (IRE) 1998	Helen Street (GB); 1982	Troy	Petingo
Sire Street Cry (IRE) 1998	Helen Street (GB); 1982	Troy	La Milo
Sire Street Cry (IRE) 1998	Helen Street (GB); 1982	Waterway	Riverman
Sire Street Cry (IRE) 1998	Helen Street (GB); 1982	Waterway	Boulevard (Family: 5-b)
Dam Vegas Showgirl (NZ) 2002	Al Akbar (AUS); 1990	Success Express	Hold Your Peace
Dam Vegas Showgirl (NZ) 2002	Al Akbar (AUS); 1990	Success Express	Au Printemps
Dam Vegas Showgirl (NZ) 2002	Al Akbar (AUS); 1990	Gala Night	Blakeney
Dam Vegas Showgirl (NZ) 2002	Al Akbar (AUS); 1990	Gala Night	Debutante
Dam Vegas Showgirl (NZ) 2002	Vegas Magic (AUS); 1985	Voodoo Rhythm	Northern Dancer
Dam Vegas Showgirl (NZ) 2002	Vegas Magic (AUS); 1985	Voodoo Rhythm	Obeah
Dam Vegas Showgirl (NZ) 2002	Vegas Magic (AUS); 1985	Vegas Street	Sovereign Edition
Dam Vegas Showgirl (NZ) 2002	Vegas Magic (AUS); 1985	Vegas Street	Vegas (Family: 5-b)

Winx is inbred 5 x 5 to Natalma, meaning Natalma appears twice in the fifth generation of Winx's pedigree as the dam of both Raise the Standard and Northern Dancer.

== See also ==
- List of leading Thoroughbred racehorses
- List of racehorses
- Repeat winners of horse races
