= Tan Chin Nam =

Malaysian businessman (1926–2018)

Yang Berbahagia Dato' Tan Chin Nam SPMT JMN
- 陳振南
- Born: 18 March 1926; Kuala Lumpur, Malaysia
- Died: 21 October 2018 (aged 92); Kuala Lumpur, Malaysia
- Citizenship: Malaysian

Tan Chin Nam

Chinese name
- Traditional Chinese: 陳振南
- Simplified Chinese: 陈振南
- Hanyu Pinyin: Chén Zhènnán
- Jyutping: Can4 Zan3 Naam4
- Hokkien POJ: Tân Chín-lâm
- Tâi-lô: Tân Tsín-lâm

Dato' Tan Chin Nam (simplified Chinese: 陈振南; traditional Chinese: 陳振南; pinyin: Chén Zhènnán; Jyutping: Can4 Zan3 Naam4; Pe̍h-ōe-jī: Tân Chín-lâm; 18 March 1926 – 21 October 2018) was a Malaysian entrepreneur and developer. His family is the majority shareholder of IGB Corporation Berhad.

Tan was reportedly one of the richest men in Malaysia and had several companies and businesses. He is famous as a property developer and was involved in various projects such as Shangri-La Hotel in Malaysia, Four Seasons Hotel Kuala Lumpur in Malaysia, shopping centres in Singapore and Malaysia, including one of the largest shopping malls in the world, Mid Valley Megamall. In Australia, he is responsible for the renovation of Queen Victoria Building (QVB) and Capitol Theatre in Sydney. He also owns a number of Australian-based Thoroughbred racehorses.

Tan's biography, released in 2006 and published by MPH Malaysia, is called Never Say I Assume!.

== Early life ==
Tan Chin Nam was born on March 18, 1926 in Kuala Lumpur, Malaysia. He was the sixth of twelve children.

== Thoroughbred horse racing ==
The principal owner for one of Australia's most successful horse trainers, Bart Cummings, Tan had a successful working relationship with Cummings for more than thirty years until the latter's death in 2015.

He owned at least a share in most of Cummings' well-known horses, including Think Big (co-owned with Queensland property developer Rick O'Sullivan and then joined by Tunku Abdul Rahman), winner of back-to-back Melbourne Cups in 1974 and 1975, as well as the multiple Group One winner, Saintly. He was the owner of the 2008 Melbourne Cup winner Viewed, and is one of four thoroughbred owners to win the Melbourne Cup four Times. He also owned 2009 and 2010 Cox Plate winner So You Think, and the winner of the 2009 Crown Oaks, Faint Perfume.

Tan owned a stud farm located along the Wingecarribee River at Burradoo, New South Wales that he named Think Big Stud.

== Chess ==
In 1975, Tan decided that there was great potential in expanding the game of chess in China. For the first eight years of the Cultural Revolution, chess had been prohibited, but in 1974 there was an easing of the ban and, together with some leading Chinese officials, Tan set-up the "Big Dragon Project", with the aim of having China dominate the chess world by 2010. In 1982 he became the first FIDE Deputy President for Asia. Tan was also president of the Malaysian chess federation for many decades.

Tan sponsored the annual chess tournament Dato' Arthur Tan Malaysian Open, which takes place in Kuala Lumpur since 2004.

== Honours ==
- Malaysia
  - Companion of the Order of the Defender of the Realm (JMN) (1978)
- Terengganu
  - Knight Grand Commander of the Order of the Crown of Terengganu (SPMT) – Dato' (1996)

== Death ==
Having retired from the corporate world in the 1990s, he died on October 21, 2018, aged 92, in Kuala Lumpur. The Dato Tan Chin Nam Stakes at Moonee Valley Racecourse in Melbourne is named in his honour.
