= C'est la guerre =

C'est la guerre may refer to:

- C'est la guerre!, a French expression meaning "that's war"
- C'est La Guerre, a racehorse
- C'est la guerre (opera), an opera by Emil Petrovics
