= Blake Shinn =

Australian jockey (born 1987)

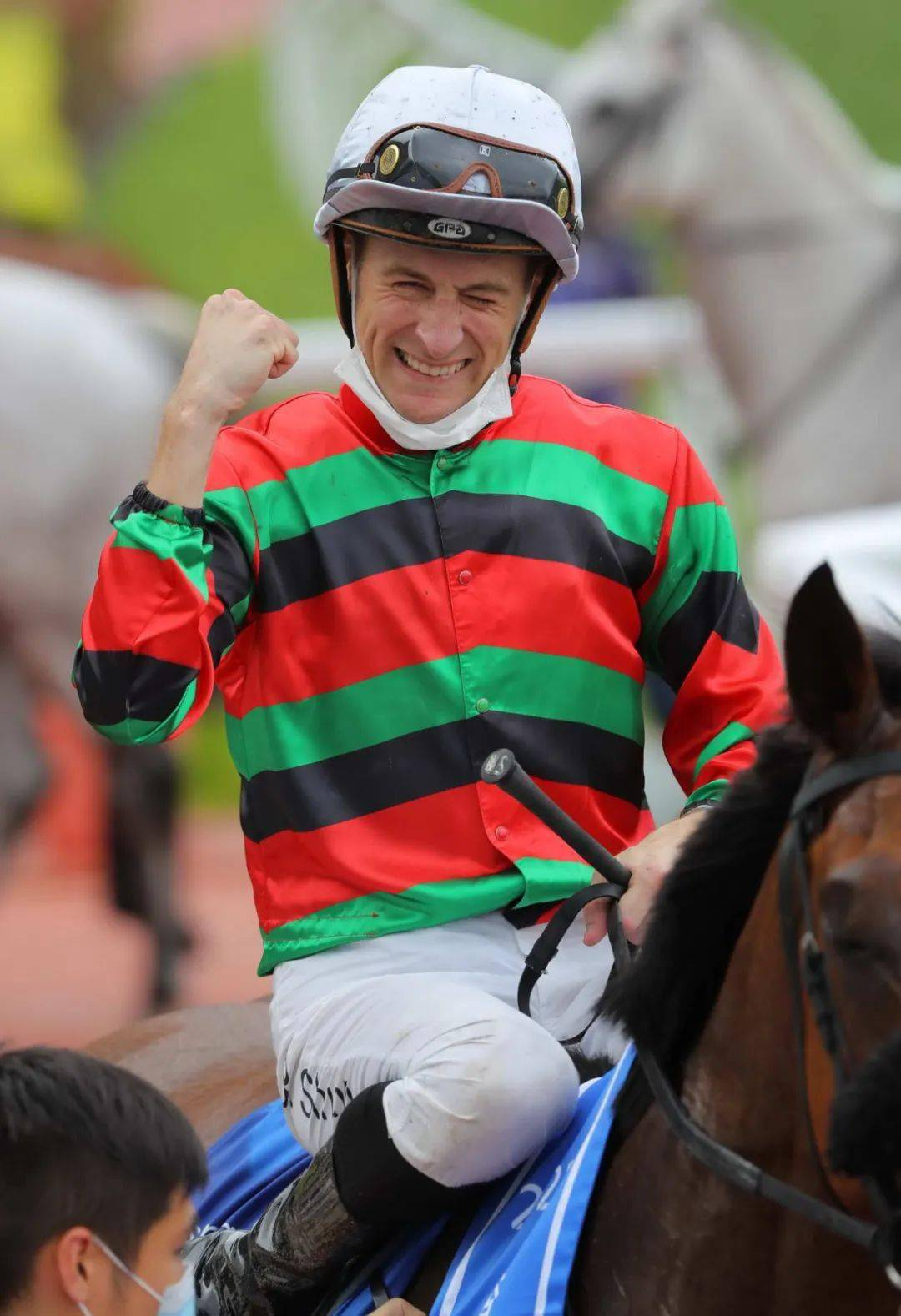

Personal information
- Born: 26 September 1987 (age 39) Victoria, Australia
- Occupation: Jockey

Horse racing career
- Sport: Horse racing
- Career wins: 2,193+ (ongoing)

Major racing wins
- 2008 Melbourne Cup, Golden Slipper Stakes

Significant horses
- Viewed, Happy Clapper, Russian Emperor

Blake Shinn (born 26 September 1987) is an Australian jockey, who rode the 2008 Melbourne Cup winner Viewed for trainer Bart Cummings.

As of late November 2026, Shinn has won 2,193 races, including 29 at Group One level. On Melbourne Cup day 2010, Blake Shinn missed his ride in the Cup on Precedence, after a fall in Race 3 at Flemington resulted in him being taken to hospital.

Shinn has also won:

- the 2021 Hong Kong Classic Mile on Excellent Proposal for trainer John Size
- the 2021 Hong Kong Sprint on Sky Field for trainer Caspar Fownes
- the 2022 Hong Kong Champions & Chater Cup on Russian Emperor for Douglas Whyte
- the 2022 Hong Kong Gold Cup on Russian Emperor for Douglas Whyte

== Major wins ==
Australia

- Adelaide Cup – (1) – Demerger (2005)
- Canterbury Stakes – (2) – Happy Clapper (2018), Trapeze Artist (2019)
- Coolmore Classic – (1) – Appearance (2013)
- Doomben Cup – (4) – Streama (2014), Pornichet (2015), Bois D'Argent (2024), Antino (2025)
- Doncaster Handicap – (1) – Happy Clapper (2018)
- Epsom Handicap – (2) – Rock Kingdom (2009), Happy Clapper (2017)
- Flight Stakes – (1) – First Seal (2014)
- Futurity Stakes – (1) – Alligator Blood (2023)
- George Main Stakes – (1) – Streama (2013)
- Golden Slipper Stakes – (2) – Capitalist (2016), Lady of Camelot (2024)
- Kingsford-Smith Cup – (1) – Hot Snitzel (2015)
- Manikato Stakes – (1) – Charm Stone (2025)
- Melbourne Cup – (1) – Viewed (2008)
- Queensland Derby – (1) – Warmonger (2024)
- Sires' Produce Stakes – (1) – Sebring (2008)
- Surround Stakes – (1) – First Seal (2015)
- Sydney Cup – (1) – Who Shot Thebarman (2018)
- Tattersall's Tiara – (1) – Prompt Response (2018)
- TJ Smith Stakes – (1) – Melito (2010)
- The Galaxy – (1) – Sweet Idea (2015)
- Toorak Handicap – (1) – Antino (2024)
- Vinery Stud Stakes – (1) – Fenway (2015)

New Zealand

- Sistema Stakes – (2) – Summer Passage (2017), Return To Conquer (2025)

Hong Kong

- Hong Kong Classic Mile – (1) – Excellent Proposal (2021)
- Hong Kong Sprint – (1) – Sky Field (2021)
- Hong Kong Gold Cup – (1) – Russian Emperor (2022)
- Hong Kong Champions & Chater Cup – (1) – Russian Emperor (2022)
