= Sunshine Coast Guineas =

Winx Guineas
- Class: Group 3
- Location: Corbould Park Racecourse; Caloundra, Queensland, Australia
- Inaugurated: 2000
- Race type: Thoroughbred - Flat racing
- Sponsor: Double R Group (2022-26)

Race information
- Distance: 1,600 metres
- Surface: Turf
- Track: Right-handed
- Qualification: Three year old
- Weight: Set Weights; Colts and geldings – 57kg Fillies – 55kg
- Purse: A$300,000 (2026)

The Winx Guineas, registered as the Sunshine Coast Guineas is a Sunshine Coast Turf Club Group 3 Thoroughbred horse race for three-year-olds, under set weights conditions, over a distance of 1600 metres at Corbould Park Racecourse, Caloundra, Queensland, Australia during the Queensland Winter Racing Carnival.

== History ==
In 2015 the event was held earlier than the usual late June or early July timing during the Queensland Winter Racing Carnival.

In 2020 the race was renamed the Winx Guineas, in honour of Winx who won the race in 2015, when ridden by Larry Cassidy. This victory was the first of a 33 race winning streak by the Australian Racing Hall of Fame horse.

=== Grade ===
- 2006–2013 - Listed race
- 2014 onwards - Group 3

=== Distance ===
- 2005 – 1560 metres
- 2006 onwards - 1600m

== Winners ==
The following are past winners of the race.

- 2026 - Cellarmaster
- 2025 - The Three Hundred
- 2024 - Xidaki
- 2023 - Knight's Choice
- 2022 - Majestic Colour
- 2021 - Our Playboy
- 2020 - Wapiti
- 2019 - Baccarat Baby
- 2018 - The Bostonian
- 2017 - Crack Me Up
- 2016 - Tivaci
- 2015 - Winx
- 2014 - Hopfgarten
- 2013 - Eximius
- 2012 - Tuskegee Hawk
- 2011 - Shenzhou Steeds
- 2010 - Fifteen Carat
- 2009 - Za Magic
- 2008 - Sam's Express
- 2007 - Maslins Beach
- 2006 - Diamondsondinside
- 2005 - Atapi
- 2004 - Au Chocolat
- 2003 - Paper Kings
- 2002 - Smart Chariot
- 2001 - Amaizcay
- 2000 - Sunset

== See also ==
- List of Australian Group races
- Group races
