= Phar Lap Stakes =

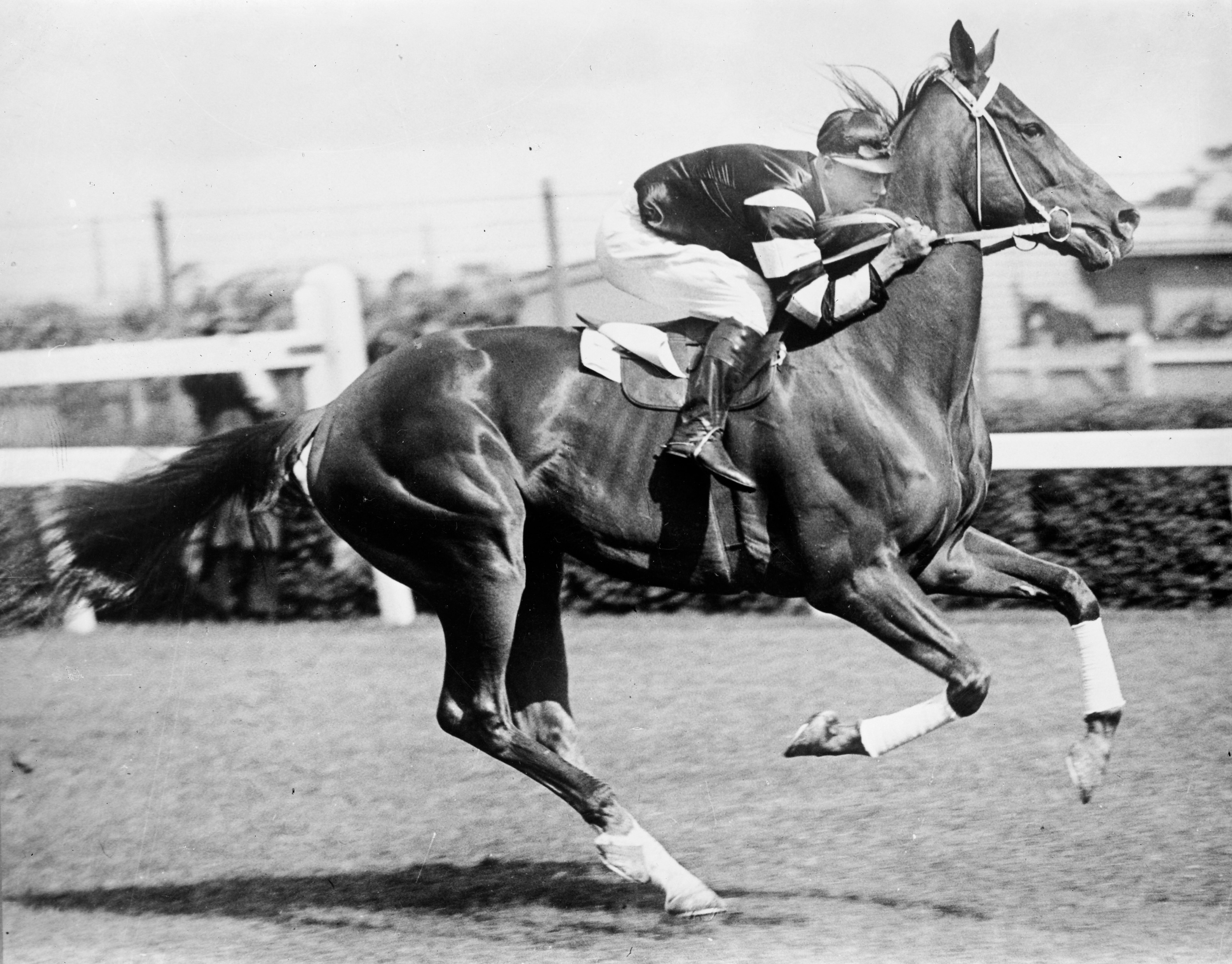
- Phar Lap and jockey Jim Pike at Flemington Racecourse
- Class: Group 2
- Location: Rosehill Gardens Racecourse
- Inaugurated: 1973
- Race type: Thoroughbred
- Sponsor: Chandon (2018-26)

Race information
- Distance: 1,500 metres
- Surface: Turf
- Qualification: Three-year-olds
- Weight: Set weights colts and geldings – 56 1/2 kg fillies – 54 1/2 kg
- Purse: $300,000 (2026)

The Phar Lap Stakes is an Australian Turf Club Group 2 Thoroughbred horse race for three-year-olds, at set weights, over a distance of 1500 metres, held annually at Rosehill Racecourse in Sydney, Australia in March.

Recent multiple winners include:

Trainers

- Chris Waller in 2015, 2017, 2018, 2019, 2020, 2021, 2023, 2025 and 2026
- John Hawkes in 2004 and 2005 and with Michael & Wayne Hawkes in 2014 and 2022.

Jockeys

- James McDonald in 2012, 2019, 2020, 2021, 2023 and 2026.

== History ==
=== Name ===
The race is named after probably the most famous horse and a symbol of Australian horse racing, Phar Lap, winner of the 1930 Melbourne Cup, the 1932 Agua Caliente Handicap and 35 other races.

=== Distance ===
- 1973–2007 - 1500 metres
- 2008 - 1550 metres (held at Canterbury)
- 2009–2013 - 1500 metres

== Winners ==
The following are past winners of the race.

- 2026 - Sixties
- 2025 - Lazzura
- 2024 - Zardozi
- 2023 - Zougotcha
- 2022 - Mr Mozart
- 2021 - Hungry Heart
- 2020 - Funstar
- 2019 - Verry Elleegant
- 2018 - Unforgotten
- 2017 - Foxplay
- 2016 - Hattori Hanzo
- 2015 - Winx
- 2014 - Traitor
- 2013 - Toydini
- 2012 - Colorado Claire
- 2011 - Blackie
- 2010 - Tickets
- 2009 - Heart Of Dreams
- 2008 - Acey Ducey
- 2007 - Just Mambo
- 2006 - Apache Cat
- 2005 - Shania Dane
- 2004 - Only Words
- 2003 - Thorn Park
- 2002 - Arlington Road
- 2001 - Maitland Gold
- 2000 - Lord Essex
- 1999 - Mr. Innocent
- 1998 - Northern Drake
- 1997 - Monet's Cove
- 1996 - Encores
- 1995 - Brave Warrior
- 1994 - Arborea
- 1993 - Kaaptive Edition
- 1992 - My Wanderin' Star
- 1991 - Be Happy
- 1990 - Solar Circle
- 1989 - Flight Schedule
- 1988 - Marwong
- 1987 - Merry Ruler
- 1986 - Periscope
- 1985 - Prince Frolic
- 1984 - Mr. Ironclad
- 1983 - Northern Reward
- 1982 - Calm Joe
- 1981 - †Private Thoughts / Trench Digger
- 1980 - Blue Dane
- 1979 - Fralo
- 1978 - Luskin Star
- 1977 - Blockbuster
- 1976 - Cheyne Walk
- 1975 - Knight Reign
- 1974 - Imagele
- 1973 - Toltrice

† Dead heat

== See also ==
- List of Australian Group races
- Group races
