= Prize Lady =

New Zealand-bred Thoroughbred racehorse

- Sire: Prized
- Grandsire: Kris S
- Dam: Pen Bal Lady
- Damsire: Mummy's Game
- Sex: Mare
- Foaled: 14 October 2001
- Country: New Zealand
- Colour: Bay
- Breeder: D.G. & R.B. McLaren Ltd
- Owner: J.C. Wallis
- Trainer: Graeme Sanders
- Record: 26: 4-4-3
- Earnings: NZ$ 964,875

Major wins
- Auckland Cup (2007, 2008)

Prize Lady is a top New Zealand thoroughbred racehorse.

== Background ==
Prize Lady is a bay mare bred in New Zealand by D.G. & R.B. McLaren Ltd. She was sired by the American stallion Prized who won the Breeders' Cup Turf in 1989.

== Racing career ==
As a three-year-old Prize Lady showed very promising form as she finished second in both the Travis Stakes to Calvert and the New Zealand Oaks behind Justa Tad.

She ventured to Australia in 2005 and was placed fourth in the Queensland Oaks and eighth in the Queensland Derby.

When moved up in distance she showed improved form and won the Auckland Cup in 2007. She repeated her Auckland Cup victory in 2008 becoming the first horse to achieve this feat since Il Tempo in 1970.

Prize Lady was 17th in the 2008 Melbourne Cup won by Viewed.

She attempted to win her third Auckland Cup in 2009, but finished 8th in what proved to be her last ever race.

== Pedigree ==
Pedigree of Prize Lady (NZ), bay mare, 2001
Sire Prized (USA) 1986	Kris S (USA); 1977	Roberto	Hail To Reason
Sire Prized (USA) 1986	Kris S (USA); 1977	Roberto	Bramalea
Sire Prized (USA) 1986	Kris S (USA); 1977	Sharp Queen	Princequillo
Sire Prized (USA) 1986	Kris S (USA); 1977	Sharp Queen	Bridgework
Sire Prized (USA) 1986	My Turbulent Miss (USA); 1976	My Dad George	Dark Star
Sire Prized (USA) 1986	My Turbulent Miss (USA); 1976	My Dad George	Mabekky
Sire Prized (USA) 1986	My Turbulent Miss (USA); 1976	Turbulent Miss	Petare
Sire Prized (USA) 1986	My Turbulent Miss (USA); 1976	Turbulent Miss	Behaving Deby
Dam Pen Bal Lady (GB) 1984	Mummy's Game (GB); 1979	Mummy's Pet	Sing Sing
Dam Pen Bal Lady (GB) 1984	Mummy's Game (GB); 1979	Mummy's Pet	Money for Nothing
Dam Pen Bal Lady (GB) 1984	Mummy's Game (GB); 1979	Final Game	Pardao
Dam Pen Bal Lady (GB) 1984	Mummy's Game (GB); 1979	Final Game	Ankole
Dam Pen Bal Lady (GB) 1984	Northern Queen (IRE); 1974	Northfields	Northern Dancer
Dam Pen Bal Lady (GB) 1984	Northern Queen (IRE); 1974	Northfields	Little Hut
Dam Pen Bal Lady (GB) 1984	Northern Queen (IRE); 1974	Dazzling Hue	Double Jump
Dam Pen Bal Lady (GB) 1984	Northern Queen (IRE); 1974	Dazzling Hue	Anchusa (Family:6-f)

== Progeny ==
Prize Lady's son Dragon Storm (born 2/11/2014), sired by 2009 Melbourne Cup winner Shocking, won 6 races including the:

- 2020 NZB Airfreight Road to Jeracho (3000m) beating Baby Menaka and Fantasy Flight
- 2020 New Zealand Cup (G3 3200m) beating Lincoln King and Hurry Cane
- 2021 Sandown Cup (Listed race, 3200m) beating True Marvel (FR) and Sweet Thomas (GER).

== See also ==
- Thoroughbred racing in New Zealand
