= So You Think =

New Zealand-bred Thoroughbred racehorse (2006–2025)

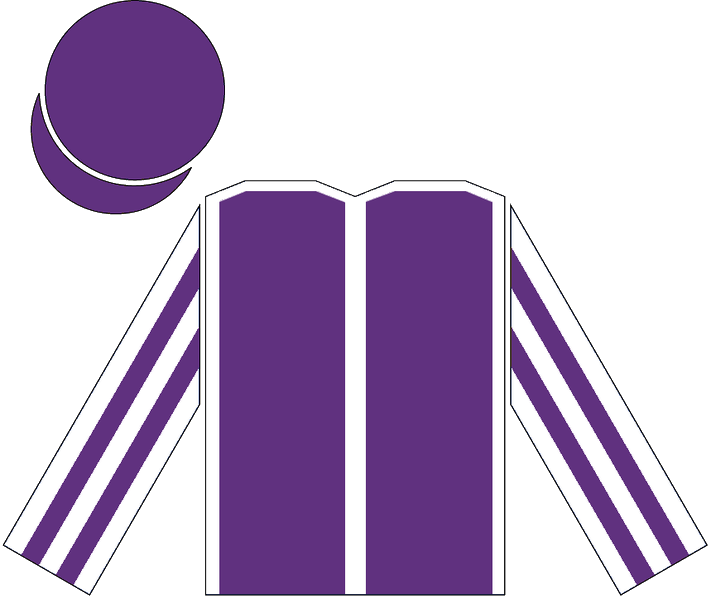
- Racing silks of Dato Tan Chin Nam and Derrick Smith
- Sire: High Chaparral
- Dam: Triassic
- Sex: Stallion
- Foaled: 10 November 2006
- Died: 20 October 2025 (aged 18)
- Country: New Zealand
- Colour: Bay or Brown
- Breeder: M.J. Moran & Piper Farm Ltd
- Owner: 1. Dato Tan Chin Nam; 2. Coolmore Stud et al.
- Trainer: 1. Bart Cummings; 2. Aidan O'Brien
- Record: 23: 14-4-1
- Earnings: A$10,749,800

Major wins
- W S Cox Plate (2009, 2010); Underwood Stakes (2010); Yalumba Stakes (2010); LKS Mackinnon Stakes (2010); Tattersalls Gold Cup (2011, 2012); Eclipse Stakes (2011); Irish Champion Stakes (2011); Prince of Wales's Stakes (2012)

Awards
- Australian Champion Three Year Old (2010); Australian Champion Middle Distance Racehorse (2011)

Honours
- New Zealand Racing Hall of Fame; Australian Racing Hall of Fame (2019); World Champion Intermediate Distance Turf Performer (2010); World Champion Extended Distance Performer (2010); Timeform rating: 133
- Last updated on 14 May 2019

So You Think (10 November 2006 – 20 October 2025) was a New Zealand-bred Thoroughbred racehorse, majority-owned by Coolmore Stud of Ireland. So You Think came to prominence through winning the 2009 and 2010 Cox Plates, Australia's premier weight for age race. His first Cox Plate win was at only his fifth career start. His second Cox Plate win came at just his tenth career start. He started as favourite for the 2010 Melbourne Cup but finished third, in his first race past 2,040 metres. So You Think was inducted into the Australian Racing Hall of Fame in 2019.

== Background ==
So You Think was bred by M J Moran & Piper Farm Ltd and foaled at the Windsor Park Stud in Cambridge, New Zealand. So You Think was purchased for $NZ110,000 at the 2008 New Zealand Bloodstock Premier Yearling Sale on behalf of Malaysian billionaire Dato' Tan Chin Nam and Tunku Ahmad Yahaya and was trained by Bart Cummings.

He was sired by the Irish-bred Epsom Derby winner High Chaparral out of Triassic, a New Zealand-bred daughter of the American stallion Tights. Although officially a bay, So You Think was a dark brown horse, sometimes appearing almost black.

Southern Hemisphere horses have their official birthday on 1 August, while in the Northern Hemisphere, the date is 1 January. This leads to some confusion concerning So You Think's age. Between 1 January and 1 August 2011, he was a four-year-old by Australian reckoning, but was regarded as a five-year-old in Europe. A similar discrepancy occurred in 2012.

== Racing career ==
=== 2008–2010: two and three-year-old seasons in Australia ===
So You Think had won two of his four starts before the 2009 Cox Plate, including a Group 3 against his fellow three-year-olds, and earned a start in the Cox Plate with a solid finish for fifth in the Caulfield Guineas. There was some debate on whether the horse had achieved enough to warrant a start in the Cox Plate, but the Moonee Valley Racing Club decided that he was up to the challenge. He won the Cox Plate in convincing style, leading all the way to win by 2½ lengths in a fast time of 2:03.98. So You Think followed up his Cox Plate win with a second in the Emirates Stakes two weeks later, in his last race as a three-year-old.

=== 2010–2011: four-year-old season in Australia ===
The horse resumed racing as a four-year-old in August 2010 with a win in the Memsie Stakes, beating several of Australia's top gallopers and making him the early favourite for the 2010 Cox Plate. Group One wins in the Underwood Stakes and the Yalumba Stakes meant he started odds-on for the Cox Plate, with many people labeling him as one of the best horses to ever race in Australia. He won the 2010 Cox Plate in convincing style with Steven Arnold as jockey. A week later the horse was untroubled in winning the Group 1 Mackinnon Stakes. He came third in the 2010 Melbourne Cup behind Maluckyday and winner Americain. After the race Coolmore Stud reportedly paid A$25 million for a majority interest in So You Think deciding to race the horse in Europe and to be trained by Aidan O'Brien.

=== 2011: five-year-old season in Europe ===
So You Think made his European debut in the Group 3 Mooresbridge Stakes at the Curragh Racecourse on 2 May 2011, winning by 12 lengths in a field of five. He made it two from two with victory in the Group 1 Tattersalls Gold Cup at the Curragh on 22 May. Trainer Aidan O'Brien said of his four-and-a-half-length success: "He's incredible - a different creature to what we've ever seen before." He was clear favourite in The Prince of Wales at Ascot 2011, with Willie Carson famously claiming you should 'bet your house' on him five minutes before the race. However, he was pipped by Rewilding, ridden by Frankie Dettori. Dettori was later suspended for nine days for excessive use of the whip on Rewilding. Huge bets had been placed on So You Think, with one punter putting on ninety thousand pounds on the morning of the race. He bounced back on his next outing, in the Eclipse Stakes at Sandown, winning by a half length from 2010 Derby and Arc winner Workforce.

Following an eight-week spell, So You Think resumed racing again in the Irish Champion Stakes, where he gained a half-length victory over multiple Group One winner Snow Fairy. A month later, despite being poorly drawn, he ran fourth in the Prix de l'Arc de Triomphe behind the German filly Danedream, who won in track record time. He was the first male over the line. So You Think's third run as a five-year-old was in the British Champion Stakes at Ascot on 15 October. He started the race as favourite and went to the front with 400 metres to run but finished second when the French horse Cirrus des Aigles stormed home to win a neck to neck run. He then contested the Breeders' Cup Classic, where he ran sixth in his first race on dirt.

=== 2012: six-year-old season in Europe ===
Following a spell of five months, during which he became a six-year-old by Northern Hemisphere reckoning he returned to racing in the Dubai World Cup, where he came fourth in his first run on Tapeta. On his return to Europe, So You Think took the Tattersalls Gold Cup for the second time, beating Famous Name by six lengths on 27 May. In June he returned to Royal Ascot for a second attempt at the Prince of Wales's Stakes. Starting 4/5 favourite against ten opponents, he took the lead two furlongs from the finish and won by two and a quarter lengths from the Queen's colt Carlton House. So You Think was scheduled to make his final appearance in the Eclipse Stakes at Sandown on 7 May, but was withdrawn after being found to be lame two days before the race.

== Race record ==
2008–09 season as a two-year-old
Result	Date	Race	Venue	Group	Distance	Weight (kg)	Jockey	Winner/2nd
Won	20 May 2009	2yo Hcp Restricted	Rosehill	NA	1400 m	57	H. Bowman	2nd - Shamash

2009–10 season as a three-year-old
Result	Date	Race	Venue	Group	Distance	Weight (kg)	Jockey	Winner/2nd
2nd	5 Sep 2009	Ming Dynasty Quality	Randwick	LR	1400 m	53	G. Schofield	1st - More Than Great
Won	19 Sep 2009	Gloaming Stakes	Rosehill	G3	1800 m	56.5	H. Bowman	2nd - Gathering
5th	10 Oct 2009	Caulfield Guineas	Caulfield	G1	1600 m	55.5	M. Rodd	1st - Starspangledbanner
Won	24 Oct 2009	W S Cox Plate	Moonee Valley	G1	2040 m	49.5	G. Boss	2nd - Manhattan Rain
2nd	7 Nov 2009	Emirates Stakes	Flemington	G1	1600 m	53.5	G. Boss	1st - All American

2010–11 season as a four-year-old
Result	Date	Race	Venue	Group	Distance	Weight (kg)	Jockey	Winner/2nd
Won	28 Aug 2010	Memsie Stakes	Caulfield	G2	1400 m	58.5	S. Arnold	2nd - Whobegotyou
Won	18 Sep 2010	Underwood Stakes	Caulfield	G1	1800 m	58	S. Arnold	2nd - Dariana
Won	9 Oct 2010	Yalumba Stakes	Caulfield	G1	2000 m	58	S. Arnold	2nd - Alcopop
Won	23 Oct 2010	W S Cox Plate	Moonee Valley	G1	2040 m	57.5	S. Arnold	2nd - Zipping
Won	30 Oct 2010	Mackinnon Stakes	Flemington	G1	2000 m	58	S. Arnold	2nd - Descarado
3rd	2 Nov 2010	Melbourne Cup	Flemington	G1	3200 m	56	S. Arnold	1st - Americain

2011 season as a five-year-old
Result	Date	Race	Venue	Group	Distance	Weight	Jockey	Winner/2nd
Won	2 May 2011	Mooresbridge Stakes	Curragh	G3	2000 m	60	S. Heffernan	2nd - Bob le Beau
Won	22 May 2011	Tattersalls Gold Cup	Curragh	G1	2100 m	57.5	R. Moore	2nd - Campanologist
2nd	15 Jun 2011	Prince of Wales's Stakes	Ascot	G1	2000 m	57	R. Moore	1st - Rewilding
Won	2 Jul 2011	Eclipse Stakes	Sandown Park	G1	2000 m	60.5	S. Heffernan	2nd - Workforce
Won	3 Sep 2011	Irish Champion Stakes	Leopardstown	G1	2000 m	60.5 kg	S. Heffernan	2nd - Snow Fairy
4th	2 Oct 2011	Prix de l'Arc de Triomphe	Longchamp	G1	2400 m	59.5 kg	S. Heffernan	1st - Danedream
2nd	15 Oct 2011	British Champion Stakes	Ascot	G1	2000 m	129 lb	R. Moore	1st - Cirrus des Aigles
6th	5 Nov 2011	Breeders' Cup Classic	Churchill Downs	G1	1¼ miles	126 lb	R. Moore	1st - Drosselmeyer

2012 season as a six-year-old
Result	Date	Race	Venue	Group	Distance	Weight	Jockey	Winner/2nd
4th	31 Mar 2012	Dubai World Cup	Meydan	G1	2000m	126 lb	J. O' Brien	1st - Monterosso
Won	27 May 2012	Tattersalls Gold Cup	Curragh	G1	2100 m	129 lb	J. O' Brien	2nd - Famous Name
Won	20 June 2012	Prince of Wales's Stakes	Ascot	G1	2000 m	126 lb	J. O' Brien	2nd - Carlton House

== Stud record ==
So You Think served as a shuttle stallion in both the Southern and Northern Hemispheres for Coolmore Stud.

=== Notable progeny ===
c = colt, f = filly, g = gelding

Foaled	Name	Sex	Major wins
2013	Inference	c	Randwick Guineas
2013	La Bella Diosa	f	New Zealand 1000 Guineas
2013	So Si Bon	g	Eclipse Stakes (MRC), Aurie's Star Handicap
2014	D'Argento	c	Rosehill Guineas
2014	Sopressa	f	Australasian Oaks
2015	Knights Order	g	Sydney Cup
2015	Nakeeta Jane	f	Surround Stakes
2015	Think It Over	g	George Ryder Stakes, Queen Elizabeth Stakes, Verry Elleegant Stakes
2016	Nimalee	f	Queen of the Turf Stakes
2016	Quick Thinker	c	Australian Derby
2017	Palaisapan	f	Tattersall's Tiara
2018	Think About It	g	Kingsford Smith Cup, Stradbroke Handicap
2021	You Wahng	f	Queensland Oaks

== Death ==
So You Think died near Coolmore's Australian stud farm at the Scone Equine Hospital, in October 2025, at the age of 18, after succumbing to a short illness.

== Honours ==
So You Think was rated equal Champion Intermediate (Middle Distance) Turf Performer in the 2010 World Thoroughbred Rankings along with Rip Van Winkle and Cape Blanco, by the International Federation of Horse Authorities. He was also rated Champion Extended Distance Performer for his 3rd in the 2010 Melbourne Cup.

== Pedigree ==
Pedigree of So You Think (NZ)
Sire High Chaparral (Ire) 1999	Sadler's Wells (USA); 1981	Northern Dancer (Can); 1961	Nearctic (Can)
Sire High Chaparral (Ire) 1999	Sadler's Wells (USA); 1981	Northern Dancer (Can); 1961	Natalma (USA)
Sire High Chaparral (Ire) 1999	Sadler's Wells (USA); 1981	Fairy Bridge (USA); 1975	Bold Reason (USA)
Sire High Chaparral (Ire) 1999	Sadler's Wells (USA); 1981	Fairy Bridge (USA); 1975	Special (USA)
Sire High Chaparral (Ire) 1999	Kasora (Ire); 1993	Darshaan (GB); 1981	Shirley Heights (GB)
Sire High Chaparral (Ire) 1999	Kasora (Ire); 1993	Darshaan (GB); 1981	Delsy (Fr)
Sire High Chaparral (Ire) 1999	Kasora (Ire); 1993	Kozana (GB); 1982	Kris (GB)
Sire High Chaparral (Ire) 1999	Kasora (Ire); 1993	Kozana (GB); 1982	Koblenza (Fr)
Dam Triassic (NZ) 1990	Tights (USA); 1981	Nijinsky (Can); 1967	Northern Dancer (Can)
Dam Triassic (NZ) 1990	Tights (USA); 1981	Nijinsky (Can); 1967	Flaming Page (Can)
Dam Triassic (NZ) 1990	Tights (USA); 1981	Dancealot (USA); 1971	Round Table (USA)
Dam Triassic (NZ) 1990	Tights (USA); 1981	Dancealot (USA); 1971	Music Please (USA)
Dam Triassic (NZ) 1990	Astral Row (NZ); 1979	Long Row (GB); 1970	Linacre (Ire)
Dam Triassic (NZ) 1990	Astral Row (NZ); 1979	Long Row (GB); 1970	Front Row (GB)
Dam Triassic (NZ) 1990	Astral Row (NZ); 1979	Pak Bun Bay (Aus); 1970	Matinee Idol (Aus)
Dam Triassic (NZ) 1990	Astral Row (NZ); 1979	Pak Bun Bay (Aus); 1970	Philipolo (NZ)
