= Nakeeta Jane =

Australian thoroughbred racehorse

- Sire: So You Think
- Grandsire: High Chaparral
- Dam: Lustre Lady
- Damsire: Flying Spur
- Sex: Mare
- Foaled: 28 August 2015
- Country: Australia
- Colour: Bay
- Breeder: Jananth Pty Ltd
- Owner: Coolmore Stud
- Trainer: Mark Newnham
- Record: 8: 3–1–2
- Earnings: A$625,300

Major wins
- Light Fingers Stakes (2019); Surround Stakes (2019)

Nakeeta Jane (foaled 28 August 2015) is a retired Group 1 winning Australian bred thoroughbred racehorse.

== Racing career ==
Unraced as a 2 year old, Nakeeta Jane made her debut at Randwick Racecourse as a 3 year old finishing a half length second at the odds of 20/1. Two weeks later she won her first race at Warwick Farm racecourse at the odds of 9/4. In this race she defeated Ranier, who would win several future stakes races and Kolding, a future Group 1 winner.

Ten days later she started at odds of 13/1 in the Group 1 Flight Stakes and ran into third place.

After spelling for 5 months, Nakeeta Jane was successful in the Light Fingers Stakes. Trainer Mark Newnham said of her victory after this race, “She's top-class, there's no doubt about that”.

At just her 5th race start she was successful in winning the Group 1 Surround Stakes. During the race she had no luck in running, but overcame all difficulties to score a half head win for jockey Josh Parr. After three unsuccessful runs further into her preparation, the horse was spelled with the plan to resume racing in the Spring Racing Carnival. However she suffered a career ending fetlock injury during track work at Warwick Farm racecourse.

== Breeding career ==
Upon retirement, Nakeeta Jane was sold to Coolmore Stud, where in her first year she will be served by US Triple Crown winner, Justify.

After missing in her first breeding season, Nakeeta Jane gave birth to her first foal, a colt by Justify in 2021.
