= Happy Clapper =

Australian Thoroughbred racehorse (2010–2025)

- Sire: Teofilo
- Grandsire: Galileo
- Dam: Busking
- Damsire: Encosta De Lago
- Sex: Gelding
- Foaled: 25 October 2010
- Died: April 2025 (aged 14)
- Country: Australia
- Colour: Bay
- Breeder: Michael Thomas
- Owner: Michael Thomas
- Trainer: Patrick Webster
- Record: 48: 12–12–6
- Earnings: A$ 7,307,800

Major wins
- Villiers Stakes (2015); Newcastle Newmarket (2017); Tramway Stakes (2017); Epsom Handicap (2017); Canterbury Stakes (2018); Doncaster Handicap (2018); Craven Plate (2019)

Happy Clapper (25 October 2010 – April 2025) was a multiple Group 1-winning Australian-bred Thoroughbred racehorse.

He is also remembered for having run second on 5 occasions behind champion race mare Winx.

== Racing career ==
Happy Clapper raced as a 2-year-old and 3-year-old without success. The horse won his first race as a 4-year-old at Sydney's Canterbury Park Racecourse when ridden by jockey Blake Shinn.

As a 5-year-old, he won his first stakes race in the Group 2 Villiers Stakes. After the race, trainer Pat Webster stated, "I've had some good horses, but I'd have to say this is the best horse I've had".

Happy Clapper achieved success as a 7-year-old in a Group 1 race when he won the Epsom Handicap at Randwick Racecourse. Trainer Pat Webster said after the race, "This is my greatest moment in racing".

Later that season, he won another two Group 1 races, the Doncaster Handicap and the Canterbury Stakes.

After finishing seventh in the 2020 Queen Elizabeth Stakes, Happy Clapper was retired from racing and sent to former jockey Mal Fitzgerald, who operates a facility for Racing NSW, retraining retired racehorses at Oxley Island near Taree.

== Death ==
On 24 April 2025, it was announced that Happy Clapper had died after a battle with colic. He was 14.
