= Prized =

American-bred Thoroughbred racehorse (1986–2014)

- Sire: Kris S.
- Grandsire: Roberto
- Dam: My Turbulent Miss
- Damsire: My Dad George
- Sex: Stallion
- Foaled: May 20 1986
- Country: United States
- Colour: Bay
- Breeder: Meadowbrook Farm
- Owner: Meadowbrook Farm & Clover Racing Stable
- Trainer: Neil Drysdale
- Record: 17: 9-2-3
- Earnings: $2,262,555

Major wins
- Swaps Stakes (1989); Frank E. Kilroe Mile Handicap (1990); San Luis Rey Handicap (1990); Breeders' Cup wins: Breeders' Cup Turf (1989)

Prized (May 20, 1986 – July 13, 2014) was an American Thoroughbred racehorse.

== Background ==
Prized was bred in Florida by Meadowbrook Farm who raced him in partnership with Clover Racing Stable. He was by the sire Kris S., a son of Epsom Derby winner Roberto, and out of the mare My Turbulent Miss.

== Racing career ==
Trained by Neil Drysdale, Prized won the Grade I Molson Million on dirt.

Prized won the 1989 Breeders' Cup Turf in his first start on grass. His other most notable victory was a win over Sunday Silence in the 1989 Grade II Swaps Stakes.

== Stud record ==
Prized was retired from racing to become a breeding stallion: he is the sire of multiple stakes winner Brass Hat and dual Auckland Cup winner Prize Lady.

== Retirement ==
After his stud career, Prized was retired to Old Friends in Georgetown, KY and lived there for the remainder of his life. He was euthanized in 2014 at age 28 due to infirmities of old age.

== Pedigree ==
Pedigree of Prized (USA), bay stallion, 1986
Sire Kris S. (USA) 1977	Roberto (USA); 1969	Hail To Reason	Turn-To
Sire Kris S. (USA) 1977	Roberto (USA); 1969	Hail To Reason	Nothirdchance
Sire Kris S. (USA) 1977	Roberto (USA); 1969	Bramalea	Nashua
Sire Kris S. (USA) 1977	Roberto (USA); 1969	Bramalea	Rarelea
Sire Kris S. (USA) 1977	Sharp Queen (USA); 1965	Princequillo	Prince Rose
Sire Kris S. (USA) 1977	Sharp Queen (USA); 1965	Princequillo	Cosquilla
Sire Kris S. (USA) 1977	Sharp Queen (USA); 1965	Bridgework	Occupy
Sire Kris S. (USA) 1977	Sharp Queen (USA); 1965	Bridgework	Feale Bridge
Dam My Turbulent Miss (USA) 1976	My Dad George (USA); 1967	Dark Star	Royal Gem
Dam My Turbulent Miss (USA) 1976	My Dad George (USA); 1967	Dark Star	Isolde
Dam My Turbulent Miss (USA) 1976	My Dad George (USA); 1967	Mabekky	Skytracer
Dam My Turbulent Miss (USA) 1976	My Dad George (USA); 1967	Mabekky	Modest Queen
Dam My Turbulent Miss (USA) 1976	Turbulent Miss (USA); 1969	Petare	Moslem
Dam My Turbulent Miss (USA) 1976	Turbulent Miss (USA); 1969	Petare	Collette
Dam My Turbulent Miss (USA) 1976	Turbulent Miss (USA); 1969	Behaving Deby	Ambehaving
Dam My Turbulent Miss (USA) 1976	Turbulent Miss (USA); 1969	Behaving Deby	Dashing Deby (Family: 8-c)
