= C'est La Guerre =

New Zealand-bred Thoroughbred racehorse

- Sire: Shinko King
- Grandsire: Fairy King
- Dam: La Magnifique
- Damsire: Kampala
- Sex: Gelding
- Foaled: 8 October 2004
- Country: New Zealand
- Colour: Bay
- Breeder: A & Mrs B C Smith
- Owner: Lloyd Williams
- Trainer: (1) Kevin Myers (2) John Sadler
- Record: 9:5–2-0
- Earnings: $466,700

Major wins
- New Zealand Derby (2008), Craven Plate (2010)
- Last updated on 12 June 2022

C'est La Guerre (foaled 8 October 2004) is a New Zealand Thoroughbred racehorse who on 1 March 2008 won the New Zealand Derby by four lengths, the largest winning margin of the race in ten years.

A son of Shinko King, C'est La Guerre was trained in Wanganui by part-owner Kevin Myers, who deserves plenty of the credit for the horse's Derby triumph. Myers trained and placed the horse brilliantly throughout the Derby campaign, having the horse at his absolute peak on Derby day after raising some eyebrows with a route that was unconventional to say the least. As the horse passed the finish line in the Derby, the astute trainer was vindicated as commentator George Simon labelled him a "deadset genius".

C'est La Guerre had his first start at Woodville on 22 October, winning a maiden three-year-old event over 1400m comfortably. In mid-November he appeared again, this time in a premier-quality race during New Zealand Cup Week at Riccarton Park, and again impressively won over 1400m.

After the perfect start to his career, things went slightly wrong in his Derby campaign. In his next start at Awapuni he was blocked 250m from home when making what looked like potentially a winning late run, and suffered the same fate in the Group 2 Great Northern Guineas on Boxing Day when finishing 2.9 lengths behind Prince Kaapstad (who two months later was runner-up to C'est La Guerre in the Derby). As a result, he had an 8th and a 7th in his formline that did no justice to the horse's performances.

He went back to his winning way at Hastings on 25 January, and then somewhat surprisingly was taken to the country track Wairoa for his next start on 13 February. His win in the $20,000 Wairoa Cup was disturbingly narrow for a Derby contender, but in hindsight the horse was probably well short of the peak he eventually reached on 1 March.

Having completed another run over distance (for second against older horses at Otaki), he travelled to Ellerslie for the Derby and was rated a $15 chance. That dropped to $10 when there was some substantial rain on the morning of the race, as he had proven himself to be proficient on rain-affected ground earlier in his career.

Given a perfect ride by regular rider David Walker, C'est La Guerre exploded to the lead early in the home straight and raced clear of Prince Kaapstad and Fritzy Boy, passing the line with ears pricked four lengths clear of the runner-up. It was a spectacular performance against a field rated among the best Derby fields in recent years.

C'est La Guerre's first run since the Derby was in another unusual race, finishing second over 1400m in an $11,000 open handicap at another country track in Blenheim. Ironically, the following day saw two horses who were unplaced in the New Zealand Derby, Nom du Jeu and Red Ruler, quinella the Australian Derby on a wet track.

== Australian career ==
In 2008 C'est La Guerre was sold to LLoyd Williams, the owner of 2007 Melbourne Cup winner Efficient, and moved to the Melbourne stable of John Sadler.

His first run in Australia was in the Memsie Stakes at Caulfield, in which he finished seventh behind Weekend Hussler. The run was good enough for some people to suggest he would be a Melbourne Cup contender for 2008. Two subsequent starts produced a disappointing run in the JRA Cup and a fast-finishing fourth in the Yalumba Stakes. In his last run before the Melbourne Cup, he caught the eye with his late finish when running sixth in the Cox Plate.

In the 2008 Melbourne Cup, ridden by Brett Prebble he finished strongly down the outside to finish third behind Viewed and Bauer.

C'est La Guerre ran eighth behind Shocking in the 2009 Melbourne Cup.

Returning in the spring of 2010 in his second start back, he had his first Australian victory in the Craven Plate at Randwick, beating Purple and Triple Honour.

He finished 3rd in the 2011 Chairman's Handicap (ATC) behind Once Were Wild and Anudjawun and then 4th in the 2011 Sydney Cup behind Stand to Gain and Older Than Time.

== See also ==
- Thoroughbred racing in New Zealand
