= Villiers Stakes =

Australian horse race

The Ingham registered as the Villiers Stakes
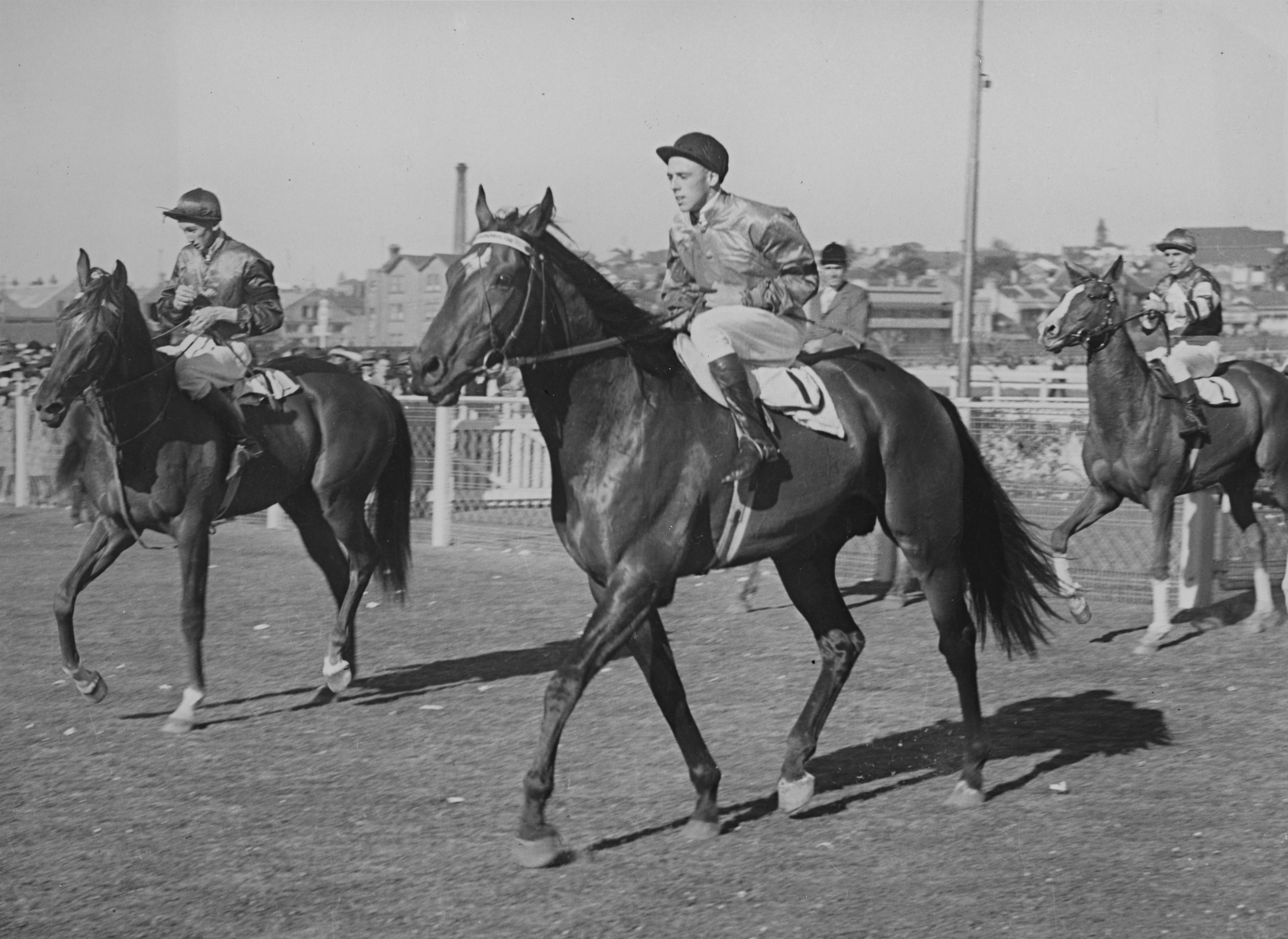
- Bernborough, 1945 winner
- Class: Group 2
- Location: Randwick Racecourse; Sydney, New South Wales, Australia
- Inaugurated: 1892
- Race type: Thoroughbred – Flat racing
- Sponsor: The Agency (2021)

Race information
- Distance: 1,600 metres
- Surface: Turf
- Track: Right-handed
- Qualification: Three year old and older
- Weight: Quality Handicap
- Purse: [[Australian dollar|$2,000,000 (2026)
- Bonuses: Exempt from ballot in the Doncaster Mile

The Villiers Stakes is an Australian Turf Club Group 2 Thoroughbred horse race held under open handicap conditions, for horses aged three years old and upwards, over a distance of 1,600 metres held at Randwick Racecourse, Sydney, Australia in early December.

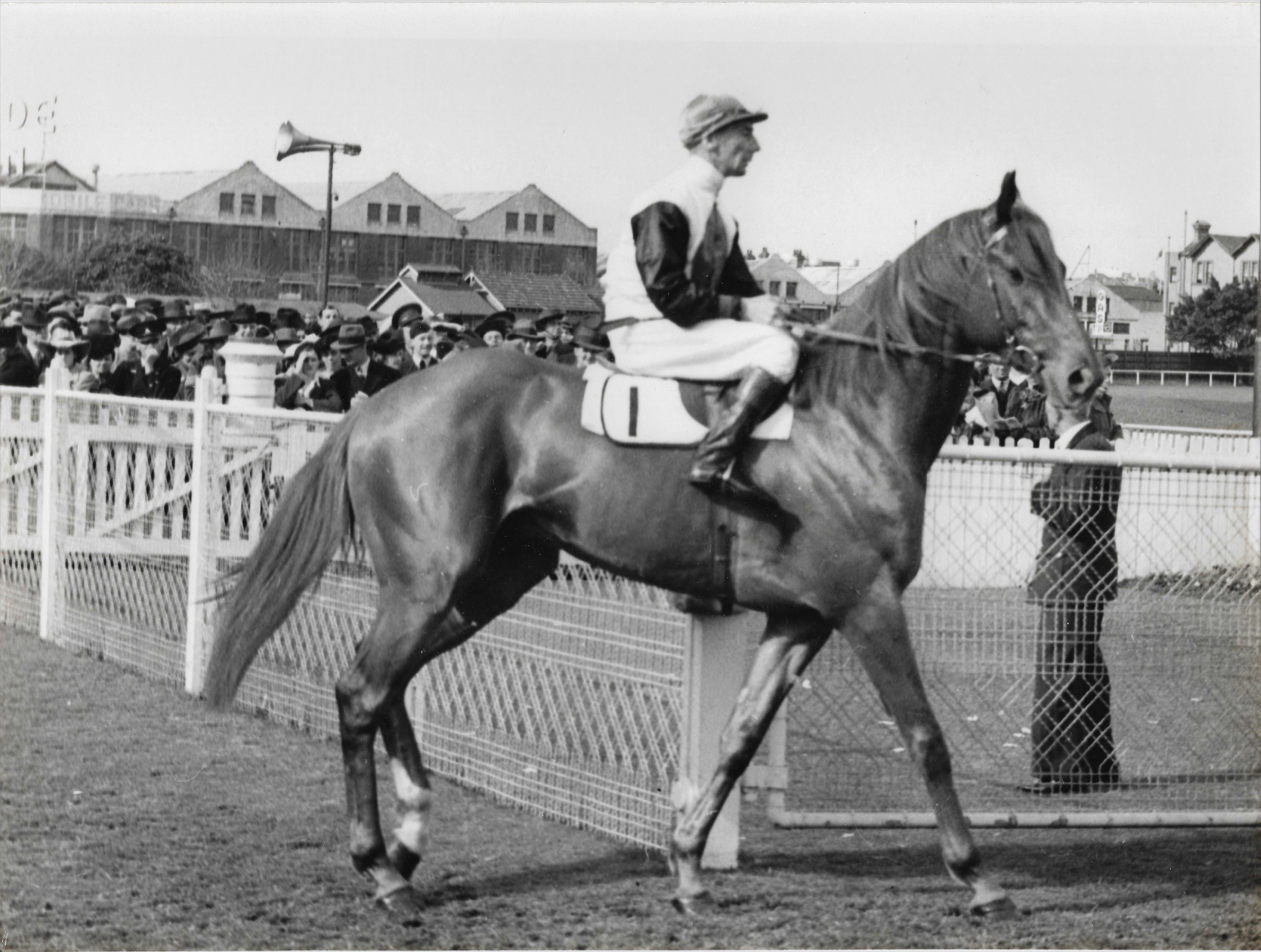
Yaralla, 1941 winner

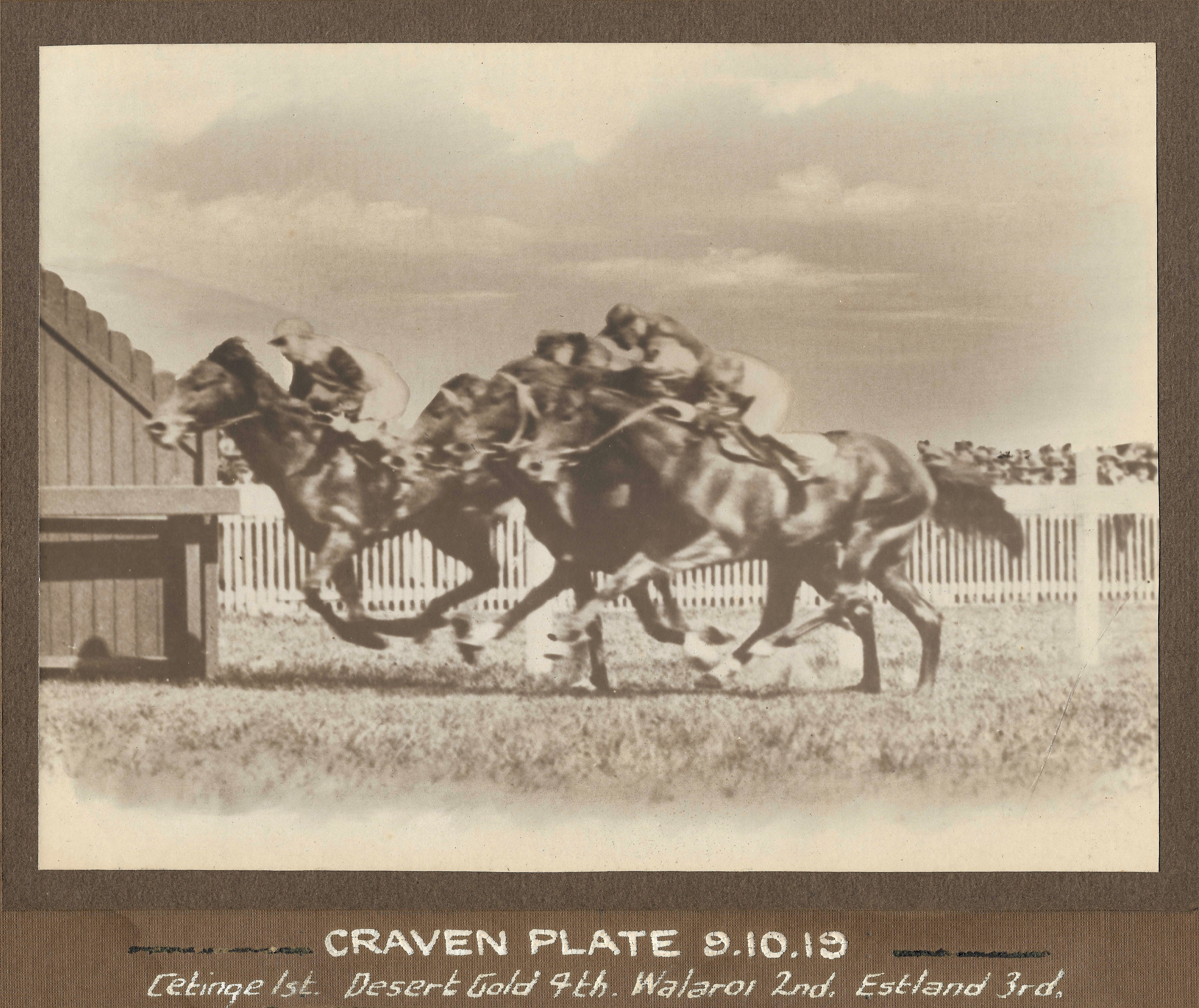
Cetigne, 1917 winner

== History ==
=== Distance ===
- 1892–1901 - 6 furlongs (~1200 metres)
- 1902–1971 - 1 mile (~1609 metres)
- 1972–2006 – 1600 metres
- January 2008 – 1400 metres
- December 2008–2012 - 1600 metres
- 2013 - 1550 metres
- 2014 onwards - 1600 metres

=== Grade ===
- 1892–1978 - Principal Race
- 1979–1985 - Group 3
- 1986 onwards - Group 2

=== Venue ===
- 2001, 2011, 2012 - Warwick Farm Racecourse

== Winners ==
The following are past winners of the race.

- 2025 - Yorkshire
- 2024 - Robusto
- 2023 - Loch Eagle
- 2022 - Kirwan's Lane
- 2021 - Brutality
- 2020 - Greysful Glamour
- 2019 - Quackerjack
- 2018 - Sky Boy
- 2017 - Crack Me Up
- 2016 - Sense Of Occasion
- 2015 - Happy Clapper
- 2014 - Rudy
- 2013 - Ninth Legion
- 2012 - All Legal
- 2011 - Monton
- 2010 - Dances On Waves
- 2009 - Palacio De Cristal
- 2008 - Something Anything
- 2007 - Honor in War
- 2006 - Utzon
- 2005 - Aqua D'Amore
- 2004 - Ikes Dream
- 2003 - On A High
- 2002 - Boreale
- 2001 - Carael Boy
- 2000 - Grey And Gold
- 1999 - Final Fantasy
- 1998 - Referral
- 1997 - Arletty
- 1996 - Touch Of Force
- 1995 - Heres The Prince
- 1994 - Aunty Mary
- 1993 - Cobbora
- 1992 - Soho Square
- 1991 - Shining Wind
- 1990 - Post Elect
- 1989 - Spot The Rock
- 1988 - Tumble On
- 1987 - Card Shark
- 1986 - Roman Artist
- 1985 - Dinky Flyer
- 1984 - Rising Prince
- 1983 - Northern Reward
- 1982 - Hussars Command
- 1981 - Zing Along
- 1980 - Tuna Too
- 1979 - Kings Ideal
- 1978 - Dear John
- 1977 - Hot Diggity
- 1976 - Top Wing
- 1975 - St Martin
- 1974 - Americano
- 1973 - Oncidon
- 1972 - Torumba
- 1971 - Tumberlua
- 1970 - Silver Points
- 1969 - Sir To Me
- 1968 - Domino King
- 1967 - Maigret
- 1966 - Nandaroo
- 1965 - Castanea
- 1964 - †Gay Song / Blue Era
- 1963 - Key
- 1962 - Emboss
- 1961 - Gene San
- 1960 - Grenoble
- 1959 - Comte De Paris
- 1958 - Caesar
- 1957 - Top Ruler
- 1956 - Empire Link
- 1955 - Lazy Day
- 1954 - Kev Mar
- 1953 - Raconteur
- 1952 - Carioca
- 1951 - Mercury
- 1950 - Field Boy
- 1949 - Veiled Art
- 1948 - Filipino
- 1947 - Barnsley
- 1946 - Native Son
- 1945 - Bernborough
- 1944 - Precise
- 1943 - Sir Neith
- 1942 - Riverton
- 1941 - Yaralla
- 1940 - Rimveil
- 1939 - Rodborough
- 1938 - Fakenham
- 1937 - Ramdin
- 1936 - Kings Head
- 1935 - Golden Chance
- 1933 - Closing Time
- 1932 - Magnetic
- 1931 - High Disdain
- 1930 - Pavilion
- 1929 - Habashon
- 1928 - Reonui
- 1927 - Zuleika
- 1926 - Queen Alwyne
- 1925 - Hemisphere
- 1924 - Balbus
- 1923 - Mont Clair
- 1922 - Wish Wynne
- 1921 - Sail On
- 1920 - Fluency
- 1919 - Anyhow
- 1918 - Rebus
- 1917 - Cetigne
- 1916 - Wedding Day
- 1915 - Lord Nagar
- 1914 - Challenge Crosse
- 1913 - Popinjay
- 1912 - Embracer
- 1911 - Myra Bluan
- 1910 - Lady Ruenalf
- 1909 - Miss Flaneur
- 1908 - Virtu
- 1907 - Kyeadgerie
- 1906 - Luciana
- 1905 - Refrain
- 1904 - Cherson
- 1903 - Air Motor
- 1902 - Kinglock
- 1901 - Sir Leonard
- 1900 - Fulminate
- 1899 - Coralie
- 1898 - Satan
- 1897 - Loch Marie
- 1896 - Vivian
- 1895 - Ordnance
- 1894 - Moorefield
- 1893 - Bliss
- 1892 - Two Up

† Dead heat

== See also ==
- List of Australian Group races
- Group races
