= 2008 Melbourne Cup =

Australian horse race

- Melbourne Cup
- Location: Flemington Racecourse; Melbourne, Australia
- Date: 4 November 2008
- Winning horse: Viewed
- Jockey: Blake Shinn
- Trainer: Bart Cummings
- Surface: Grass
- Attendance: 107,280

Viewed dashed to the front now, Viewed raced away from them, from Moatize, here's Profound Beauty running home, Bauer coming down the outside and C'est La Guerre. Viewed is clear though, 200 meters to go, Bauer ran to second, C'est La Guerre coming home hard. Viewed in front, Bauer's a big danger, Viewed by a neck, Bauer's getting there, Viewed holding on, Bauer dives... Viewed a nose to Bauer, I think!

— Commentator Greg Miles describes the climax of the race

The 2008 Melbourne Cup, the 148th running of Australia's most prestigious Thoroughbred horse race, was run on Tuesday, 4 November 2008, starting at 3:00 pm local time (0400 UTC). It was won by Viewed.

On 3 December 2008, Luca Cumani, trainer of second-place Bauer, announced that an inquiry was underway into treatment Bauer received on the Thursday prior to the race. The treatment was a form of physio therapy that is illegal to administer within 7 days of a race; as a result of the treatment, Bauer could have been stripped of his second place. However, Racing Victoria announced on 4 December that Bauer would not be disqualified.

== Field ==
The official field for the cup including horses scratched after the field was finalised.

Number	Horse	Trainer	Jockey	Weight (kg)	Barrier^{[b]}	Placing
1	Septimus	Aidan O'Brien	Johnny Murtagh	58.5	10	18th
2	Master O'Reilly	Danny O'Brien	Vlad Duric	55	6	4th
3	Honolulu	Aidan O'Brien	Colm O'Donoghue	54.5	24	21st
4	C’est La Guerre	John Sadler	Brett Prebble	54	5	3rd
5	Nom Du Jeu	Murray Baker	J Lloyd	54	1	8th
6	Yellowstone	Jane Chapple-Hyam	J F Egan	54	scr	scr ^{[1]}
7	Zipping	John Sadler	Danny Nikolic	54	16	9th
8	Mad Rush	Luca Cumani	Damien Oliver	53.5	4	7th
9	Ice Chariot	Ron Maund	Michael Rodd	53	22	11th
10	Viewed	Bart Cummings	Blake Shinn	53	9	1st
11	Littorio	Nigel Blackiston	Steven King	52.5	17	13th
12	Bauer	Luca Cumani	Corey Brown	52	13	2nd^{[4]}
13	Boundless	Stephen Mckee	Greg Childs	52	20	15th
14	Gallopin	Danny O'Brien	James Winks	52	21	DNF^{[2]}
15	Guyno	Lou Luciani	Craig Newitt	52	8	12th
16	Zarita	Pat Hyland	Dwayne Dunn	52	scr	scr ^{[3]}
17	Newport	Paul Perry	Chris Symons	51.5	15	10th
18	Profound Beauty	Dermot Weld	Glen Boss	51.5	2	5th
19	Red Lord	Anthony Cummings	Nicholas Hall^{[a]}	51.5	14	16th
20	Varevees	Richard Gibson	Craig Williams	51.5	23	14th
21	Prize Lady	Graeme Sanders	Mark Sweeney	51	18	17th
22	Alessandro Volta	Aidan O'Brien	W M Lordan	50.5	11	20th
23	Barbaricus	Danny O'Brien	Stephen Baster	50.5	3	19th
24	Moatize	Bart Cummings	Ms Claire Lindop	50	19	6th

Notes

- ^{a} Apprentice jockey.
- ^{b} Horses in barriers to the outside of the scratched horse will move inwards.
- ^{1} Yellowstone scratched by vets, after failing to recover from a hip injury sustained last week.
- ^{2} Gallopin did not finish
- ^{3} Zarita scratched, by trainer due to respiratory infection.
- ^{4} a probe into treatment Bauer received prior to the race could have resulted in the horse being stripped of second place

== Results ==
The race was won by the Bart Cummings trained horse Viewed, with Honolulu officially last as Gallopin did not finish the race.

Place	Barrier	Horse	Race Time
1st	8	Viewed	3-20.40
2nd	11	Bauer (IRE)	
3rd	5	C'est La Guerre (NZ)	
4th	6	Master O'Reilly (NZ)	
5th	2	Profound Beauty (IRE)	
6th	17	Moatize	
7th	4	Mad Rush (USA)	
8th	1	Nom du Jeu (NZ)	
9th	14	Zipping	
10th	13	Newport	
11th	20	Ice Chariot	
12th	7	Guyno (NZ)	
13th	15	Littorio	
14th	21	Varevees (GBR)	
15th	18	Boundless (NZ)	
16th	12	Red Lord	
17th	16	Prize Lady (NZ)	
18th	9	Septimus (IRE)	
19th	3	Barbaricus	
20th	10	Alessandro Volta (GBR)	
21st	22	Honolulu (IRE)	
DNF	19	Gallopin (NZ)	
-	-	~~Yellowstone~~ (IRE)	Scratched
-	-	~~Zarita~~ (NZ)	Scratched
