= Viewed =

Australian-bred Thoroughbred racehorse

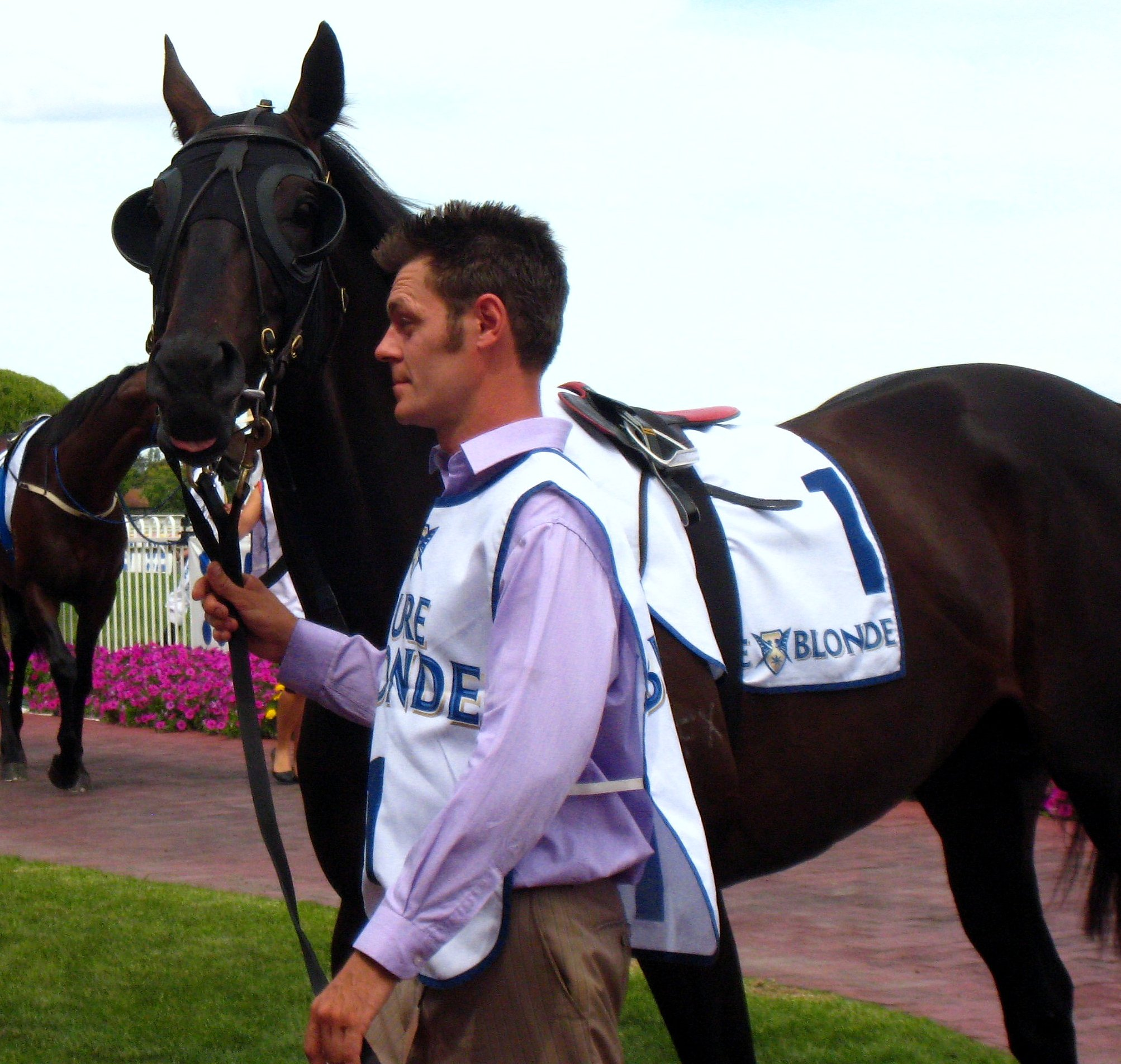
- Sire: Scenic (IRE)
- Grandsire: Sadler's Wells
- Dam: Lovers Knot (NZ)
- Damsire: Khozaam
- Sex: Stallion
- Foaled: 4 October 2003
- Died: 18 April 2010 (aged 6)
- Country: Australia
- Colour: Bay
- Breeder: Ian Johnson
- Owner: Dato Tan Chin Nam
- Trainer: Bart Cummings
- Record: 36: 9-4-3
- Earnings: A$6,006,530

Major wins
- Brisbane Cup (2008); Melbourne Cup (2008); JRA Plate (2008); Caulfield Cup (2009)

Awards
- Australian Champion Stayer (2008/09)

Viewed (4 October 2003 – 18 April 2010) was an Australian Thoroughbred racehorse who won the 148th Melbourne Cup on 4 November 2008.

== Racing record ==
=== 2008 Melbourne Cup ===
Prior to the Cup, Viewed won the AJC Listed Japan Racing Association (JRA) Plate on 30 April 2008 and two months later he qualified by winning the Group 2 Brisbane Cup on 9 June 2008.

In the 2008 Melbourne Cup on 4 November, Viewed defeated the Luca Cumani-trained Bauer in a photo finish. The finish was so close that the electronic timing devices, which are placed inside the saddle cloths, recorded that Bauer had completed the course one-hundredth of a second faster than Viewed.

Viewed was trained by Bart Cummings and was ridden by Blake Shinn. It was Shinn's first Melbourne Cup winner and the 12th for Cummings. It was the fourth time Cummings had won the Cup in partnership with Dato Tan Chin Nam, the owner. Viewed's Melbourne Cup was the 250th Group 1 training victory for Bart Cummings.

Viewed was an outsider in the Melbourne Cup, and paid $41.00 on the totalisator in New South Wales.

=== 2009 Caulfield Cup ===
Following the Melbourne Cup, Viewed failed to break through in four starts during the autumn however these runs included:

- 4th in the Group 2 Apollo Stakes to Tuesday Joy.
- 4th in the Group 1 Chipping Norton Stakes, again to Tuesday Joy.
- 2nd in the Group 1 Ranvet Stakes to Thesio.
- 3rd in Group 1 The BMW to Fiumicino.

Viewed returned in the spring to win the Group 1 Caulfield Cup on 17 October 2009. He was ridden by Brad Rawiller, and came from the tail of the field. Viewed was the first original topweight in history to win the Caulfield Cup, and the first Melbourne Cup winner to win the following year's Caulfield Cup since Rising Fast in 1955.

Viewed defeated one of his stablemates, Roman Emperor, who was second and Vigor was third. Viewed's win was Cummings's seventh Caulfield Cup.

=== 2009 Melbourne Cup ===
After his victory in the Caulfield Cup, Viewed then ran in the Group 1 Mackinnon Stakes on Victoria Derby Day and finished 3rd behind Scenic Shot and Miss Maren.

Viewed then finished 7th in the 2009 Melbourne Cup behind the eventual winner Shocking.

== Death ==
On 18 April 2010, Viewed was euthanised following complications from a twisted bowel.

== See also ==
- List of Melbourne Cup winners
