= Surround Stakes =

- Class: Group 1
- Location: Randwick Racecourse, Sydney, Australia
- Inaugurated: 1979
- Race type: Thoroughbred
- Sponsor: The Chase (2025-26)

Race information
- Distance: 1,400 metres
- Surface: Turf
- Track: Right-handed
- Qualification: Three year old fillies
- Weight: Set weights – 56 kg
- Purse: $750,000 (2026)

The Surround Stakes is an Australian Turf Club Group 1 Thoroughbred horse race for three-year-old fillies, run at set weights over a distance of 1400 metres at Randwick Racecourse, Sydney, Australia in late February or early March.

== History ==
The race is named after 1976–1977 Australian Champion Racehorse of the Year, Surround the only three-year-old filly in history to win the Cox Plate.

Gai Waterhouse trained the winners in 2001, 2003, 2005, 2010 and 2024 (with Adrian Bott).

Jim Cassidy had wins with Gold Edition (2007), Dear Demi (2013) and Thump (2014).

In 2025, The Chase commenced a three year partnership as naming rights sponsor of the time honoured race which has been renamed the G1 The Chase Surround Stakes The Chase is a thoroughbred operation that supports the Australian breeding division of the China Horse Club.

=== Grade ===
- 1979–1985 – Group 3
- 1986–2017 – Group 2
- 2018 onwards – Group 1

=== Venue ===
- 1979 – Warwick Farm Racecourse
- 1980–1981 – Randwick Racecourse
- 1982–2000 – Warwick Farm Racecourse
- 2001 – Randwick Racecourse
- 2002–2007 – Warwick Farm Racecourse
- 2008–2009 – Randwick Racecourse
- 2010–2015 – Warwick Farm Racecourse
- 2016 onwards – Randwick Racecourse

== Winners ==
The following are past winners of the race.

- 2026 - Tempted
- 2025 – Lady Shenandoah
- 2024 – Tropical Squall
- 2023 – Sunshine In Paris
- 2022 – Hinged
- 2021 – Forbidden Love
- 2020 – Probabeel
- 2019 – Nakeeta Jane
- 2018 – Shoals
- 2017 – La Bella Diosa
- 2016 – Ghisoni
- 2015 – First Seal
- 2014 – Thump
- 2013 – Dear Demi
- 2012 – Streama
- 2011 – Parables
- 2010 – More Joyous
- 2009 – Portillo
- 2008 – Chinchilla Rose
- 2007 – Gold Edition
- 2006 – Regal Cheer
- 2005 – Lotteria
- 2004 – Only Words
- 2003 – Bollinger
- 2002 – Hosannah
- 2001 – On Type
- 2000 – Ad Alta
- 1999 – Savannah Success
- 1998 – Staging
- 1997 – Dashing Eagle
- 1996 – Shame
- 1995 – Princess D'Or
- 1994 – So Keen
- 1993 – Skating
- 1992 – Office
- 1991 – Let's Hurry
- 1990 – Ochiltree
- 1989 – Glenview
- 1988 – Judyann
- 1987 – Khaptivaan
- 1986 – Ma Chiquita
- 1985 – Avon Angel
- 1984 – La Caissiere
- 1983 – Royal Regatta
- 1982 – Lost World
- 1981 – Hanalei
- 1980 – Brava Jeannie
- 1979 – Impede

== See also ==
- List of Australian Group races
- Group races
