= Auraria Stakes =

- Class: Group 3
- Location: Morphettville Racecourse, South Australia
- Inaugurated: 1944
- Race type: Thoroughbred - Flat racing
- Sponsor: Sportsbet (2024-26)

Race information
- Distance: 1,800 metres
- Surface: Turf
- Track: Left-handed
- Qualification: Three year old fillies
- Weight: Set weights with penalties
- Purse: A$150,000 (2026)

The Auraria Stakes is a South Australian Jockey Club Group 3 thoroughbred horse race for three year old fillies raced under Set Weights with penalties conditions, over a distance of 1800 metres at Morphettville Racecourse in Adelaide, Australia.

== History ==
The race is named in honour of the horse Auraria, winner of the 1895 Melbourne Cup. The race was inaugurated in 1944 by the Port Adelaide Racing Club, but since the club's race track Cheltenham Park Racecourse was unavailable during World War II the race was held at Morphettville Racecourse. The following year the race was run at Cheltenham.

=== Name ===
- 1944–1998 - Auraria Stakes
- 1999–2005 - Lakewood Stud Stakes
- 2006–2010 - Auraria Stakes
- 2011–2020 - Schweppervescence Stakes
- 2021 - Auraria Stakes

=== Distance ===
- 1944 - 1 mile (~1609 metres)
- 1945 - 1 mile 9 yards (~1619 metres)
- 1946–1959 - 8 1/2 furlongs (~1700 metres)
- 1960–1972 - 1 1/8 miles (~1800 metres)
- 1973–1984 – 1850 metres
- 1985–1992 – 1800 metres
- 1993 – 1809 metres
- 1994–2007 – 1800 metres
- 2008–2009 – 1812 metres
- 2010 onwards - 1800 metres

=== Grade ===
- 1944–1979 - Principal Race
- 1980 onwards - Group 3

=== Venue ===
- 1944 - Morphettville
- 1945–1980 - Cheltenham Park
- 1981–1984 - Victoria Park
- 1985–1992 - Morphettville
- 1993–1996 - Victoria Park
- 1997–2001 - Cheltenham Park
- 2002 - Morphettville
- 2003–2006 - Cheltenham Park
- 2007 - Morphettville
- 2008 - Cheltenham Park
- 2009 onwards - Morphettville

=== Multiple winners ===
Trainers

- Bart Cummings in 1974, 1976. 1981, 1984 and 1985
- Lee Freedman in 1986, 1992 and 2000
- John Hawkes in 1979, 1987 and 2002
- Colin Hayes in 1975 and 1977
- David A. Hayes in 1994, 2006 and 2013.
- Tony McEvoy in 2003 and with Calvin McEvoy in 2020
- Darren Weir in 2017 and 2018.

Jockeys

- Declan Bates in 2019 and 2026
- Glen Boss in 2009 and 2011
- Darren Gauci in 2001 and 2002
- John Letts in 1980, 1981,1984, 1985 and 1986
- Matthew Neilson in 2007 and 2013
- Craig Williams in 2000 and 2016.

Ref:

== Winners ==
The following are past winners of the race.

- 2026 - Mating Call
- 2025 - Cinch
- 2024 - Wings Of Song
- 2023 - Jennilala
- 2022 - My Whisper
- 2021 - Tyche Goddess
- 2020 - Silent Sovereign
- 2019 - Mirette
- 2018 - Sopressa
- 2017 - Kenedna
- 2016 - Silent Sedition
- 2015 - Fitocracy
- 2014 - Girl In Flight
- 2013 - Global Balance
- 2012 - Crucial
- 2011 - Shylight
- 2010 - Fairy Oak
- 2009 - Princess Pulse
- 2008 - Moment In Time
- 2007 - Devil Moon
- 2006 - Purde
- 2005 - Overclock
- 2004 - Dane Belltar
- 2003 - Yvonne
- 2002 - Clothilde
- 2001 - Shelbourne Lass
- 2000 - Grand Echezeaux
- 1999 - Episode
- 1998 - La Volta
- 1997 - Exalted Miss
- 1996 - Miss Margaret
- 1995 - Tranquility
- 1994 - Ascona
- 1993 - Prime Again
- 1992 - Gatherneaux
- 1991 - Shavano Miss
- 1990 - Alleged Lady
- 1989 - Our Libra Lady
- 1988 - Faithful Thought
- 1987 - Flaming Wonder
- 1986 - Miss Clipper
- 1985 - Katikate
- 1984 - Maintenon
- 1983 - race not held
- 1982 - Irish Heiress
- 1981 - Sheraco
- 1980 - Kaupo
- 1979 - Hot Silk
- 1978 - Laurente
- 1977 - Pushy
- 1976 - Marist Lady
- 1975 - Yaraandoo
- 1974 - Soma
- 1973 - Hi Maralie
- 1972 - Tressi
- 1971 - Quseir
- 1970 - Rain Amore
- 1969 - Goliette
- 1968 - Anthony's Daughter
- 1967 - Kasota
- 1966 - Lady Twilight
- 1965 - Te Parae
- 1964 - Nickel Shot
- 1963 - Raindear
- 1962 - Kirksite
- 1961 - Shady Lass
- 1960 - Serene Princess
- 1959 - Mintaway
- 1958 - Demeter
- 1957 - Cherete
- 1956 - Sleep Tight
- 1955 - Wine Lover
- 1954 - Everest Victory
- 1953 - Nokomis
- 1952 - Naetor
- 1951 - Gay Comedy
- 1950 - Carry Abbie
- 1949 - Classee
- 1948 - Could Be
- 1947 - Gallery Girl
- 1946 - Look
- 1945 - Maraken
- 1944 - Chariot

== See also ==
- R N Irwin Stakes
- List of Australian Group races
- Group races
