= Breeders' Stakes (SAJC) =

- Class: Group 3
- Location: Morphettville Racecourse, South Australia
- Inaugurated: 1955
- Race type: Thoroughbred
- Sponsor: Sportsbet (2025 & 2026)

Race information
- Distance: 1,200 metres
- Surface: Turf
- Track: Left-handed
- Qualification: Two year old
- Weight: Set weights colts and geldings – 57 1/2 kg fillies – 55 1/2 kg
- Purse: $150,000 (2026)

The Breeders' Stakes is a South Australian Jockey Club Group 3 Thoroughbred horse race for two-year-olds, over a distance of 1200 metres, held annually at Morphettville Racecourse in Adelaide, Australia during the autumn.

== History ==
Notable horses to win the event in the 1960s include Pago Pago and Storm Queen who went on to win the Golden Slipper Stakes as well as champion Tobin Bronze. The race was held in early February, but was moved to later in the autumn.

=== Distance ===
- 1955–1972 - 6 furlongs (~1200m)
- 1973–1979 - 1200 metres
- 1980 - 1450 metres
- 1981–2001 - 1200 metres
- 2002 - 1263 metres
- 2003 onwards - 1200 metres

=== Grade ===
- 1955–1978 - Principal Race
- 1979–2005 - Group 2
- 2006 onwards - Group 3

=== Name ===
- 1955–1967 - Bloodhorse Breeders' Stakes
- 1968–1979 - Blue Breeders' Stakes
- 1980–1983 - Bloodhorse Breeders' Stakes
- 1984–1993 - West End Breeders' Stakes
- 1994 onwards - Breeders' Stakes

=== Venue ===
In 1980 the event was held at Victoria Park Racecourse.
In 2002 the event was held at Cheltenham Park Racecourse.

== Winners ==
The following are past winners of the race.

- 2026 - Verzain
- 2025 - Legacy Bound
- 2024 - Growing Empire
- 2023 - Treasurway
- 2022 - See You In Heaven
- 2021 - Cloudy
- 2020 - Ecumenical
- 2019 - Kooweerup
- 2018 - Tequila Time
- 2017 - Broadband
- 2016 - Tris
- 2015 - Last Bullet
- 2014 - London Lolly
- 2013 - Excites Zelady
- 2012 - Big Chill
- 2011 - Rockshaft
- 2010 - Shrapnel
- 2009 - Colour
- 2008 - Augusta Proud
- 2007 - Murjana
- 2006 - De Lago Mist
- 2005 - Freestyle
- 2004 - Deprivation
- 2003 - Syrinx
- 2002 - Great Glen
- 2001 - Pelt
- 2000 - Happy Morning
- 1999 - Ruthless Tycoon
- 1998 - Astralita
- 1997 - Gold Guru
- 1996 - Zeya
- 1995 - Padre
- 1994 - Blevic
- 1993 - Laubali
- 1992 - Credit Account
- 1991 - Jakpil
- 1990 - Berberia
- 1989 - Golden Prayer
- 1988 - Sovereign Lady
- 1987 - Exploding Wonder
- 1986 - Military Plume
- 1985 - New Atlantis
- 1984 - Lockley's Tradition
- 1983 - Coral Queen
- 1982 - Lady Neelia
- 1981 - Neptune Princess
- 1980 - Outward Bound
- 1979 - Runaway Kid
- 1978 - Pacifica
- 1977 - Red Cat
- 1976 - Out Of Danger
- 1975 - Aconite
- 1974 - Girl Wonder
- 1973 - Fill The Cellar
- 1972 - Colambre
- 1971 - Big Sioux
- 1970 - Regal Heir
- 1969 - Morning Joy
- 1968 - Lady Freux
- 1967 - Manihi
- 1966 - Storm Queen
- 1965 - Tobin Bronze
- 1964 - Lady Pompilia
- 1963 - Pago Pago
- 1962 - Leica Lot
- 1961 - Heir Apparent
- 1960 - Jet Beau
- 1959 - Happy Smile
- 1958 - Resenda
- 1957 - Mapleson
- 1956 - Alstarr
- 1955 - Eminent Star

== See also ==
- Australasian Oaks
- Chairman's Stakes
- John Hawkes Stakes
- Queen Of The South Stakes
- Robert Sangster Stakes
- Tobin Bronze Stakes
- List of Australian Group races
- Group races
