= Chairman's Stakes (SAJC) =

Horse race in Adelaide, Australia

- Class: Group 3
- Location: Morphettville Racecourse, South Australia
- Inaugurated: 1983
- Race type: Thoroughbred
- Sponsor: PFD Food Services (2024-26)

Race information
- Distance: 2,000 metres
- Surface: Turf
- Track: Left-handed
- Qualification: Three-year-olds
- Weight: Set weights colts and geldings – 57 1/2 kg fillies – 55 1/2 kg
- Purse: $150,000 (2026)

The Chairman's Stakes is a South Australian Jockey Club Group 3 Thoroughbred horse race for three-year-olds, at set weights, over a distance of 2,000 metres at the Morphettville Racecourse, Adelaide, Australia, in the Autumn Carnival.

== History ==
The race is considered a prep lead-up race for the Group 1 South Australian Derby which is usually run a couple of weeks after this race at the same track.

Four horses have won the Chairman's–SA Derby double:
Markham (1997), Mummify (2003), Rebel Raider (2009), Howard Be Thy Name (2016), Leicester (2018)

=== Name ===
- 1983–1992 - Chairman's Stakes
- 1993–2003 - The Veuve Clicquot Stakes
- 2004–2005 - Yalumba Plate
- 2006–2008 - Chairman's Stakes
- 2009–2010 - Chairman's TAB Stakes
- 2011 - Chairman's Tattsbet Stakes
- 2012 - Chairman's Stakes
- 2013 - Chairman's Veolia Stakes
- 2014 onwards - Chairman's Stakes

=== Distance ===
- 1983–1984 - 2000 metres
- 1985 - 1850 metres
- 1986–1989 - 2000 metres
- 1990 - 2003 metres
- 1991–1992 - 2250 metres
- 1993 - 2014 metres
- 1994–2000 - 2000 metres
- 2001 - 2024 metres
- 2002 - 2000 metres
- 2003 - 2025 metres
- 2004 - 2024 metres
- 2005 - 2031 metres
- 2006–2007 - 2020 metres
- 2008–2009 - 2000 metres
- 2010 - 2014 metres
- 2011 - 2020 metres
- 2012–2014 - 2000 metres
- 2015–2016 - 2020 metres
- 2017 - 2030 metres
- 2018, 2020 - 2035 metres
- 2019 - 2032 metres
- 2021 - 2040 metres
- 2022 onwards - 2000 metres

=== Grade ===
- 1982–2010 - Listed Race
- 2011 onwards - Group 3

=== Venue ===
- 1983–1984 - Victoria Park
- 1985 - Cheltenham Park
- 1986–1990 - Victoria Park
- 1991–1992 - Cheltenham Park
- 1993–2001 - Morphettville
- 2002 - Victoria Park
- 2003 onwards - Morphettville

== Winners ==
The following are past winners of the race.

- 2026 - Impulsive Reaction
- 2025 - Athanatos
- 2024 - Bold Soul
- 2023 - Red Sun Sensation
- 2022 - Jungle Magnate
- 2021 - Royal Mile
- 2020 - Dalasan
- 2019 - Declarationofheart
- 2018 - Leicester
- 2017 - Waging War
- 2016 - Howard Be Thy Name
- 2015 - October Date
- 2014 - Gamblin' Guru
- 2013 - Hioctdane
- 2012 - Heavens Riches
- 2011 - Kittens
- 2010 - Red Colossus
- 2009 - Rebel Raider
- 2008 - Zagreb
- 2007 - Family Guy
- 2006 - Obglo
- 2005 - Threedee
- 2004 - Roll On Royce
- 2003 - Mummify
- 2002 - Silver Baron
- 2001 - Bush Padre
- 2000 - Shorblue
- 1999 - Seasquill
- 1998 - Pennyweight Point
- 1997 - Markham
- 1996 - Beserk
- 1995 - Our Marquise
- 1994 - Striking Twig
- 1993 - Raising Kentucky
- 1992 - Dendy Park
- 1991 - Dubai Desert
- 1990 - Double Gin
- 1989 - Leica Rock
- 1988 - Jolly Good Thought
- 1987 - Scotch Caper
- 1986 - Hydrology
- 1985 - Unconquered
- 1984 - Tea Biscuit
- 1983 - Lady Vanessa

== See also ==
- Australasian Oaks
- SA Breeders Stakes
- John Hawkes Stakes
- Queen Of The South Stakes
- Robert Sangster Stakes
- Euclase Stakes (Tobin Bronze Stakes)
- SA Fillies Classic
- Schweppes Oaks (Australasian Oaks)
- South Australian Derby
- List of Australian Group races
- Group races
