= Queen of the South Stakes =

Queen of the South
- Class: Group 2
- Location: Morphettville Racecourse, South Australia
- Inaugurated: 1981 (as Breeders' Matchmaker Stakes)
- Race type: Thoroughbred
- Sponsor: [Sportsbet} (2025 & 2026)

Race information
- Distance: 1,600 metres
- Surface: Turf
- Track: Left-handed
- Qualification: Fillies and mares three years old and older
- Weight: Set weights with penalties
- Purse: $250,000 (2026)

The Queen of the South Stakes is a South Australian Jockey Club Group 2 Thoroughbred horse race for fillies and mares, three years old and up, at set weights with penalties, over a distance of 1600 metres held at Morphettville Racecourse in Adelaide, Australia during the SAJC Autumn Carnival.

== History ==
=== Name ===
- 1981 - Breeders' Matchmaker Stakes
- 1982–1990 - Queen of the South Stakes
- 1991–1992 - Southwark Premium Classic
- 1993–1999 - Sedgwick Classic
- 2000–2005 - Marsh Classic
- 2006 - Coolmore Mile
- 2007 - Waterford Wedgwood Trophy
- 2008 onwards - Queen of the South Stakes

=== Grade ===
- 1982–1985 - Listed Race
- 1986 - Group 3
- 1987 onwards - Group 2

=== Distance ===
- 1981 - 1500 metres (held at Victoria Park)
- 1982 onwards - 1600 metres

=== Records ===
The race record time for running of the 1600 metres is held by Shavano Miss in a time of 1:34.55 in 1991.

Most wins by a trainer - 6 times:

- Colin Hayes - 1981, 1983–85, 1989–90

== Winners ==
The following are past winners of the race.

- 2026 - Cilacap
- 2025 - Zloties
- 2024 - Seonee
- 2023 - Caste
- 2022 - Silent Sovereign
- 2021 - Fabric
- 2020 - Shrouded In Mist
- 2019 - Music Bay
- 2018 - French Emotion
- 2017 - Amelie's Star
- 2016 - Into The Mist
- 2015 - Atlantis Dream
- 2014 - Tango's Daughter
- 2013 - Star of Giselle
- 2012 - So Pristine
- 2011 - Goon Serpent
- 2010 - Returntosender
- 2009 - Bird of Fire
- 2008 - Trick Of Light
- 2007 - Cinque Cento
- 2006 - Open Cut
- 2005 - Hidden Strings
- 2004 - Jameela
- 2003 - Sylvaner
- 2002 - Sylvaner
- 2001 - Lady Marion
- 2000 - La Zoffany
- 1999 - Noircir
- 1998 - Spectrum
- 1997 - Miss Tessla
- 1996 - Saleous
- 1995 - Our Marquise
- 1994 - Ausmart
- 1993 - San Pauli Girl
- 1992 - Shavano Miss
- 1991 - Shavano Miss
- 1990 - Memphis Blues
- 1989 - Memphis Blues
- 1988 - Adraanito
- 1987 - Goblet
- 1986 - Canny Lass
- 1985 - Star Style Girl
- 1984 - Casey Belle
- 1983 - Corona Miss
- 1982 - Rose Of Kingston
- 1981 - Parisian Romp
- 1980 - Golden Kingdom

== See also ==
- Australasian Oaks
- SA Breeders Stakes
- Chairman's Stakes
- John Hawkes Stakes
- Robert Sangster Stakes
- Tobin Bronze Stakes
- List of Australian Group races
- Group races
