= R. N. Irwin Stakes =

- Class: Group 3
- Location: Morphettville Racecourse, South Australia
- Inaugurated: 1955
- Race type: Thoroughbred - Flat racing
- Sponsor: Sportsbet (2024-26)

Race information
- Distance: 1,100 metres
- Surface: Turf
- Track: Left-handed
- Qualification: Three years old and older
- Weight: Weight for Age
- Purse: A$150,000 (2026)

The R. N. Irwin Stakes is a South Australian Jockey Club Group 3 Weight for Age Thoroughbred horse race for three year olds and older, run over a distance of 1100 metres at Morphettville Racecourse, Adelaide, Australia in the autumn.

== History ==
The race was originally run in January but was moved to March as part of the change in dates for the Adelaide Cup carnival in 2006. The race was moved again in 2012 to April and the race is now a lead up preparation race for the Goodwood Handicap.

=== Name ===
- 1955–2006 - R.N. Irwin Stakes
- 2007 - German Arms Hotel Stakes
- 2008 - CMA Recycling Stakes
- 2009 onwards - R.N. Irwin Stakes

=== Distance ===
- 1955–1972 - 6 furlongs (~1200 metres)
- 1973–1974 - 1200 metres
- 1975–1979 - 1100 metres
- 1980–1981 - 1450 metres
- 1982–1985 - 1200 metres
- 1986–2000 - 1100 metres
- 2001–2002 - 1000 metres
- 2003 onwards - 1100 metres

=== Grade ===
- 1955–1979 - Principal Race
- 1980–1990 - Group 2
- 1991 onwards - Group 3

=== Venue ===
- 1955–1979 - Morphettville
- 1980–1981 - Victoria Park
- 1982–2000 - Morphettville
- 2001 - Victoria Park
- 2002 - Cheltenham Park
- 2003 onwards - Morphettville

=== Recent multiple winners ===
Trainers

- Leon Macdonald in 2002 and 2007 as well as with Andrew Gluyas in 2010 and 2015.

Jockeys

- Jason Holder in 2001, 2002 and 2020.
- Clare Lindop in 2007, 2010, 2015

== Winners ==
The following are past winners of the race.

- 2026 - Super Smink
- 2025 - Asfoora
- 2024 - Benedetta
- 2023 - Kallos
- 2022 - Bella Vella
- 2021 - Kemalpasa
- 2020 - Gytrash
- 2019 - Hard Empire
- 2018 - Dainty Tess
- 2017 - Viddora
- 2016 - Nostradamus
- 2015 - Daytona Grey
- 2014 - Driefontein
- 2013 - Kulgrinda
- 2012 - We're Gonna Rock
- 2011 - Avenue
- 2010 - Augusta Proud
- 2009 - Diplomatic Force
- 2008 - Here De Angels
- 2007 - Flying Object
- 2006 - Leone Chiara
- 2005 - Super Elegant
- 2004 - Stand By Me
- 2003 - Bomber Bill
- 2002 - Regal Kiss
- 2001 - Stand By Me
- 2000 - Suit
- 1999 - Sports
- 1998 - La Baraka
- 1997 - Scorn Bold
- 1996 - Scorn Bold
- 1995 - Hero Wind
- 1994 - Kenvain
- 1993 - Hot Arch
- 1992 - Street Ruffian
- 1991 - Beau George
- 1990 - Leica Western
- 1989 - Jet Fighter
- 1988 - Redelva
- 1987 - Lord Galaxy
- 1986 - Rory's Jester
- 1985 - Red Tempo
- 1984 - Copper Rocket
- 1983 - Montrose Lass
- 1982 - Galleon
- 1981 - Ducatoon
- 1980 - Domax
- 1979 - Stormy Rex
- 1978 - Lipman
- 1977 - Silent Gift
- 1976 - High Value
- 1975 - Red Loam
- 1974 - Toltrice
- 1973 - Idolou
- 1972 - Eastern Court
- 1971 - Sanderae
- 1970 - Fileur
- 1969 - Steel Helmet
- 1968 - Fileur
- 1967 - Sunny Coronation
- 1966 - Contempler
- 1965 - Millionairess
- 1964 - Naelyn
- 1963 - Benibasha
- 1962 - Kelvin Valley
- 1961 - Rain King
- 1960 - Bomba
- 1959 - Power Duke
- 1958 - Sleep Tight
- 1957 - In Transit
- 1956 - Columbo King
- 1955 - Never Rest

== See also ==
- Auraria Stakes
- List of Australian Group races
- Group races
