= Robert Sangster Stakes =

- Class: Group 1
- Location: Morphettville Racecourse, South Australia
- Inaugurated: 1983
- Race type: Thoroughbred
- Sponsor: Sportsbet (2024-26)

Race information
- Distance: 1,200 metres
- Surface: Turf
- Track: Left-handed
- Qualification: Fillies and mares (no age or class restriction)
- Weight: Weight for Age
- Purse: $1,000,000 (2026)

The Robert Sangster Stakes, is a South Australian Jockey Club Group 1 Thoroughbred Weight for Age horse race for fillies and mares two (2) years old and upwards, over a distance of 1200 metres at the Morphettville Racecourse Adelaide, Australia in the Autumn Carnival.

== History ==
The race was held in February prior to 2006. After rescheduling of the Adelaide Cup Carnival the SAJC moved the race to the autumn.

In 2005 the race was renamed the Robert Sangster Stakes after prolific owner and breeder Robert Sangster who died in 2004.

Robert Sangster was the principal of Swettenham Stud and the renaming recognises his contribution to the Australian thoroughbred industry.

=== Name ===
- 1983–2004 - Swettenham Stud Stakes
- 2005–2009 - Robert Sangster Stakes
- 2010–2014 - Sportingbet Classic
- 2015 - William Hill Classic
- 2016–2018 - Ubet Classic
- 2019–2021 - TAB Classic
- 2022 onwards - Robert Sangster Stakes

=== Grade ===
- 1983 - Special Race
- 1984–1985 - Listed Race
- 1986–2003 - Group 3
- 2004 - Group 2
- 2005 onwards - Group 1

=== Venue ===
The race was run in 2002 at Cheltenham Park over a distance of 1250 metres.

=== Records ===
The race record time for running of the 1200 metres is held by Umaline in a time of 1:08.14 in 2001.

=== Recent multiple winners ===
Trainers

- Mick Price in 1998, 2004, 2009 and 2017 and also with Michael Kent (Jnr) in 2025
- Lee Freedman - 2005–07

Jockeys

- Damien Oliver in 2005, 2017 and 2019

== Winners ==
The following are past winners of the race.

- 2026 - Geegees Mistruth
- 2025 - Charm Stone
- 2024 - Climbing Star
- 2023 - Ruthless Dame
- 2022 - Snapdancer
- 2021 - Instant Celebrity
- 2020 - Bella Vella
- 2019 - Spright
- 2018 - Shoals
- 2017 - Secret Agenda
- 2016 - Precious Gem
- 2015 - Miracles Of Life
- 2014 - Driefontein
- 2013 - Platelet
- 2012 - Black Caviar
- 2011 - Response
- 2010 - Rostova
- 2009 - Bel Mer
- 2008 - Juste Momente
- 2007 - Universal Queen
- 2006 - Ellicorsam
- 2005 - Alinghi
- 2004 - French Bid
- 2003 - Our Egyptian Raine
- 2002 - Suzy Grey
- 2001 - Umaline
- 2000 - Rain Dance Lady
- 1999 - Dantelah
- 1998 - Spirit Of Love
- 1997 - Apple Danish
- 1996 - Mad Shavril
- 1995 - Viminaria
- 1994 - Tarare
- 1993 - True Spirit
- 1992 - Western Chorus
- 1991 - With Me
- 1990 - Leica Western
- 1989 - Tree Of Renown
- 1988 - Even True
- 1987 - Wicked Smile
- 1986 - Lost Art
- 1985 - Showport
- 1984 - Vatican Lass
- 1983 - Ranee’s Palace

== See also ==
- Australasian Oaks
- SA Breeders Stakes
- Chairman's Stakes
- John Hawkes Stakes
- Queen Of The South Stakes
- Tobin Bronze Stakes
- List of Australian Group races
- Group races
