= Gatum Gatum =

Australian-bred Thoroughbred racehorse

- Sire: Star Of Baroda (GB)
- Grandsire: Nearco (ITY)
- Dam: Certa Ceta (AUS)
- Damsire: Merry Mathew (GB)
- Sex: Gelding
- Foaled: 1958
- Died: 1985
- Country: Australia
- Colour: Brown
- Owner: Malcolm Reid
- Trainer: Graeme Heagney

Major wins
- South Australian Derby (1961); Melbourne Cup (1963)
- Last updated on 30 December 2012

Gatum Gatum (1958−1985) was an Australian Thoroughbred racehorse who won the 1963 Melbourne Cup.

Despite winning the 1961 SAJC South Australian Derby as a three-year-old and a second placing in the 1963 Caulfield Cup he carried just 7 st 12 lb (50 kg) to victory in the Cup.

His owner, Malcolm Reid had bred the 1945 Melbourne Cup winner Rainbird but had sold her as a filly to his brother Clifford.
