= Harry Coffey =

Australian jockey

Harry Coffey (born 19 October 1995) is an Australian jockey based in Victoria. On his 29th birthday he won the 2024 Caulfield Cup on Duke De Sessa.

Coffey is the son of Maree Coffey and Austy Coffey, a horse trainer in Swan Hill. He was diagnosed with cystic fibrosis at six weeks of age. Because of his illness, racing stewards were reluctant to let him ride, but he and his father persisted, and he began riding in country races in 2011. At a meeting at Wycheproof in 2016, he rode six of the seven winners, five of them on horses trained by his father.

Coffey rode his first Group One winner in the 2018 Australasian Oaks on Sopressa, his second in the 2024 Oakleigh Plate on Queman, and his third in the 2024 Caulfield Cup. He rode his 1,000th winner at Donald on 2 December 2025. As of late August 2026, he has ridden 1,073 winners, including four Group Ones. He was awarded the Victorian Racing Media Association Personality of the Year award for 2024 in recognition of his racing success and his work on behalf of those with cystic fibrosis.

Coffey and his wife Tayla have two children. They live at Swan Hill.
