= South Australian Derby =

- Class: Group 1
- Location: Morphettville Racecourse, Adelaide, Australia
- Inaugurated: 1860 (as The Thebarton Derby)
- Race type: Thoroughbred – Flat racing
- Sponsor: Thomas Farms (2022-26)

Race information
- Distance: 2,500 metres
- Surface: Turf
- Track: Left-handed
- Qualification: Three-year-olds colts and geldings – 56 1/2 kg fillies – 54 1/2 kg
- Weight: Set Weights
- Purse: A$1,000,000 (2026)

The South Australian Derby is a South Australian Jockey Club Group 1 Thoroughbred horse race for three-year-olds, at set weights, run over a distance of 2,500 metres at Morphettville Racecourse in Adelaide, Australia during the SAJC Autumn Carnival.

== History ==
The inaugural running of the race was on 5 January 1860 at Thebarton Racecourse which is located today in Mile End. The race was called The Thebarton Derby and had stakes of 100 sovereigns with an additional sweep of 10 sovereigns with a forfeit of 2 sovereigns. The race was won by the famous colonial pastoralist C.B. Fisher's, four-year-old mare Midnight who carried 8 stone 10 pounds and ridden by jockey Simpson in a time of 2:54.

By 1862 the race was simply known as The Derby and in 1866 the Summer meet was held before Christmas Day. For a period of seven years between 1869 and 1875 the race was not held. When the race was resumed in 1876 it was held at Morphettville Racecourse and it was held in September during the SAJC Spring meeting.

The early winner Tim Whiffler is not to be confused with the 1867 Melbourne Cup winner of the same name.

The race attracted many fine horses who would later excel in other prestigious races around the country. 1880 saw The Assyrian, a son of Countryman (GB) win the race and two years later win the Melbourne Cup.

1903 saw the simply named F.J.A. prevail and the son of Wallace would also win a VRC Derby, Toorak Handicap and The All Aged Stakes.

1961 winner Gatum Gatum also went on to win the Melbourne Cup in 1963 while the 1972 winner Dayana was a Perth Cup winner in 1973.

Subzero won the race in 1992 and he would win the Melbourne Cup on a wet track the next season, and also the G1 Adelaide Cup.

The 2009 winner Rebel Raider succeeded after earlier he won the VRC Derby.

Fillies have also had some success in the race. Most recently Delicacy completed the Australasian Oaks–SA Derby double in 2015.

=== Distance ===
- 1860–1971 – 1 1/2 miles (~2400 metres)
- 1972 – 2400 metres
- 1973–1977 – 2500 metres
- 1978–1979 – 2400 metres
- 1980 – 2600 metres
- 1981–1985 – 2500 metres
- 1986–2004 – 2400 metres
- 2005 onwards – 2500 metres

=== Recent multiple winners ===
Trainers

- Darren Weir in 2016, 2017 and 2018.
- Phillip Stokes in 2025 and 2026

Jockeys

- John Allen in 2016, 2017, 2020 and 2021
- Greg Childs in 2006 and 2008
- Ben Melham in 2011 and 2013
- Danny Nikolic in 2002 and 2003.

=== 1951 racebook ===
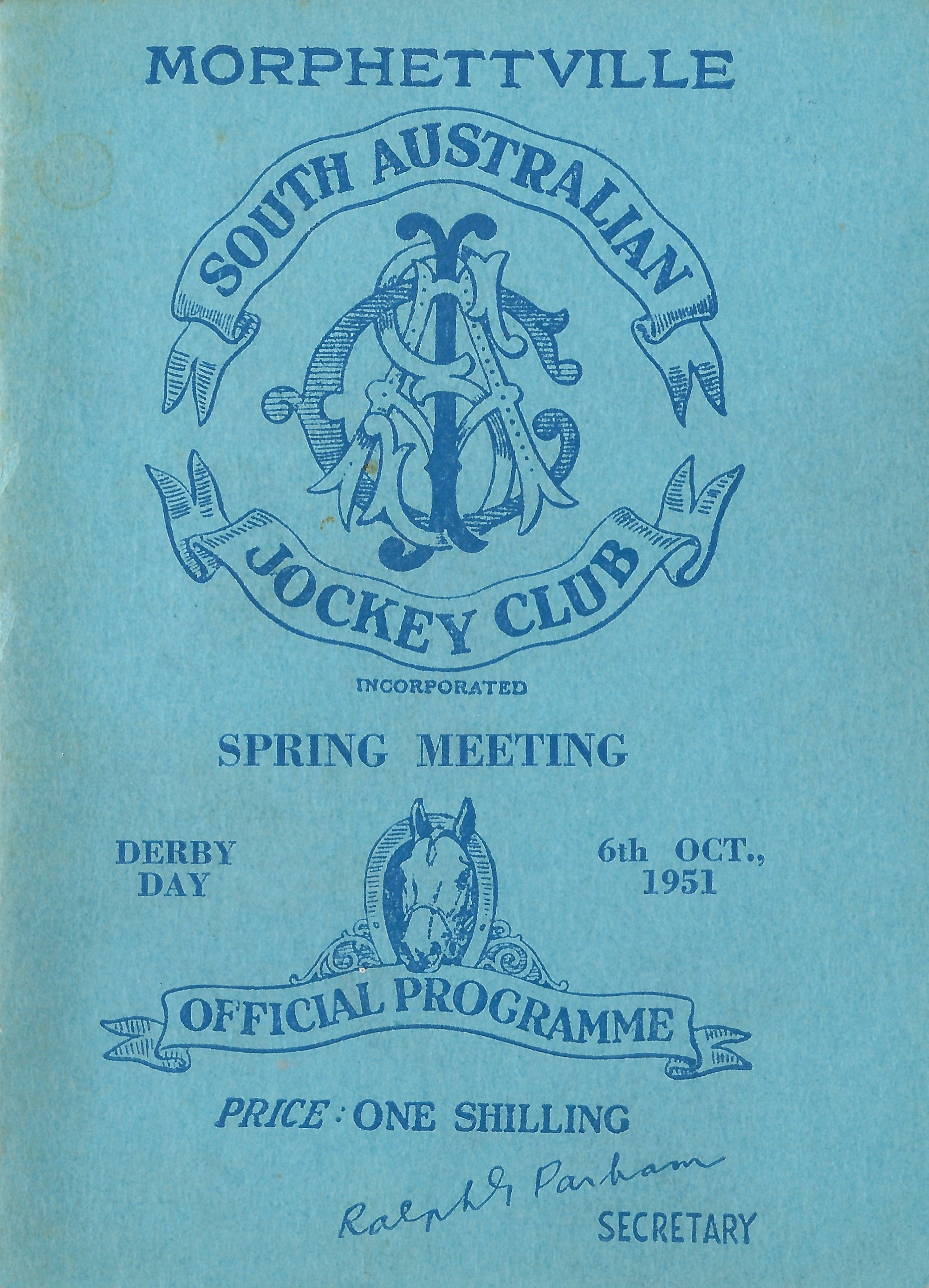
1951 SAJC South Australian Derby front cover

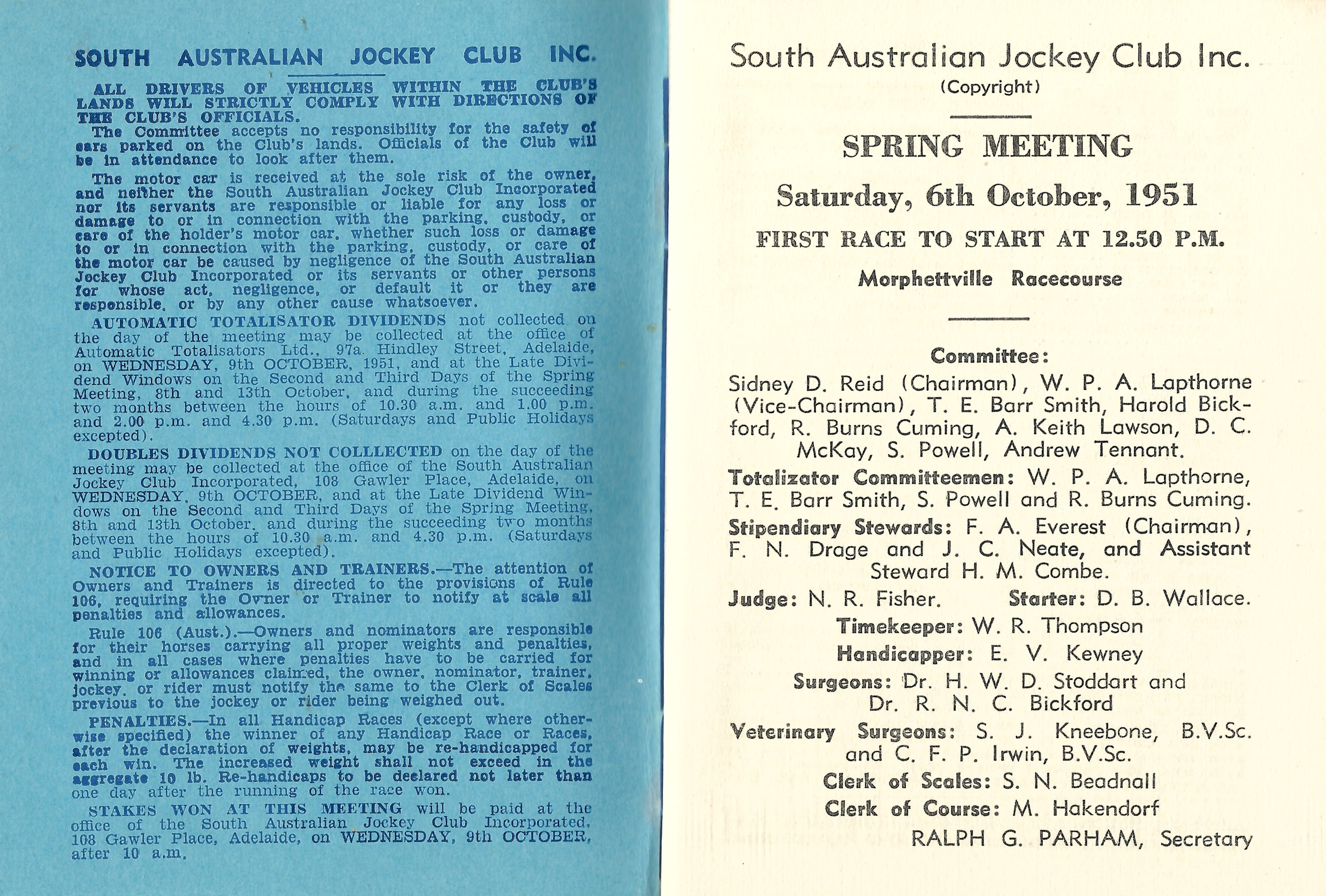
1951 SAJC South Australian Derby showing raceday officials

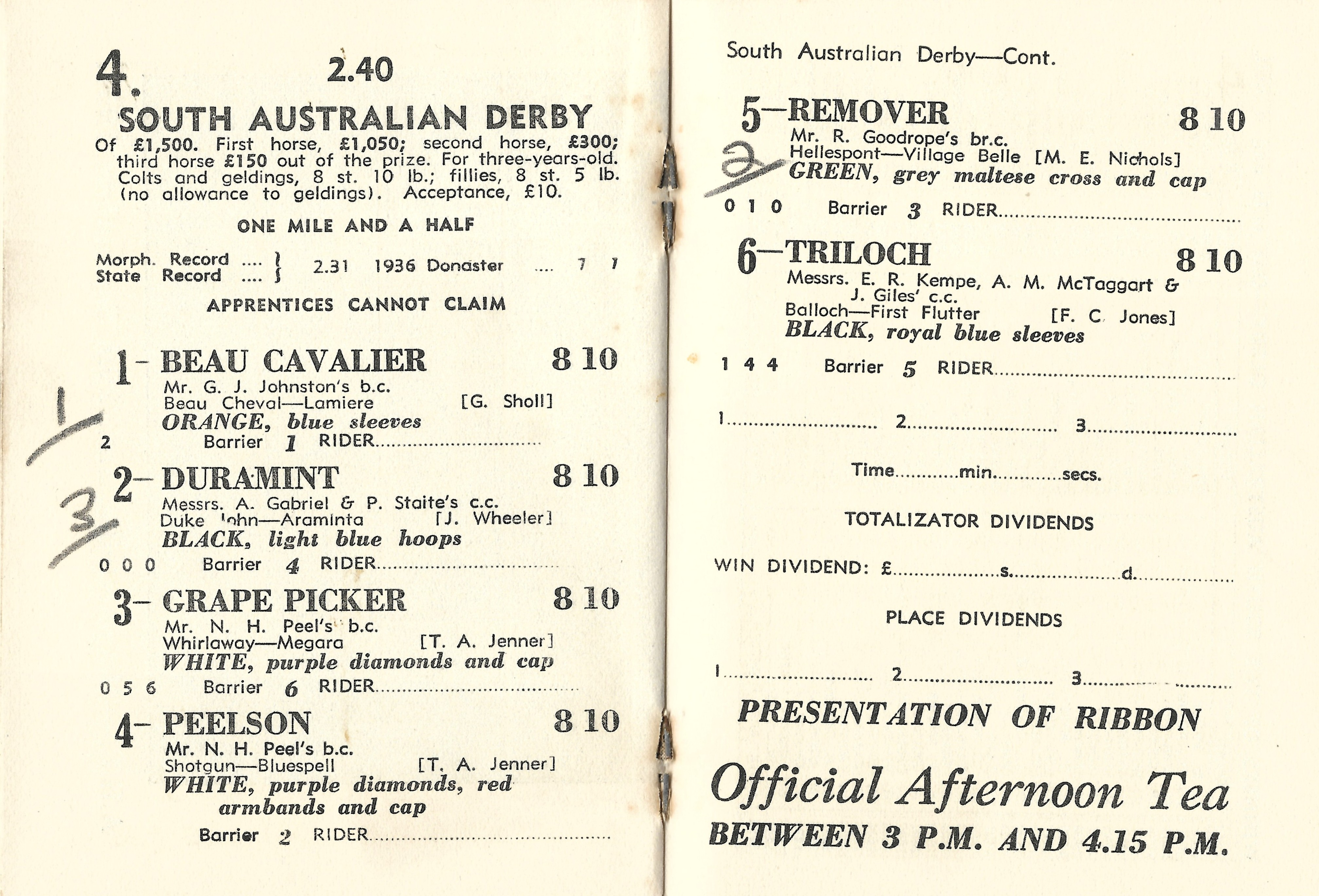
1951 SAJC South Australian Derby winner, Beau Cavalier

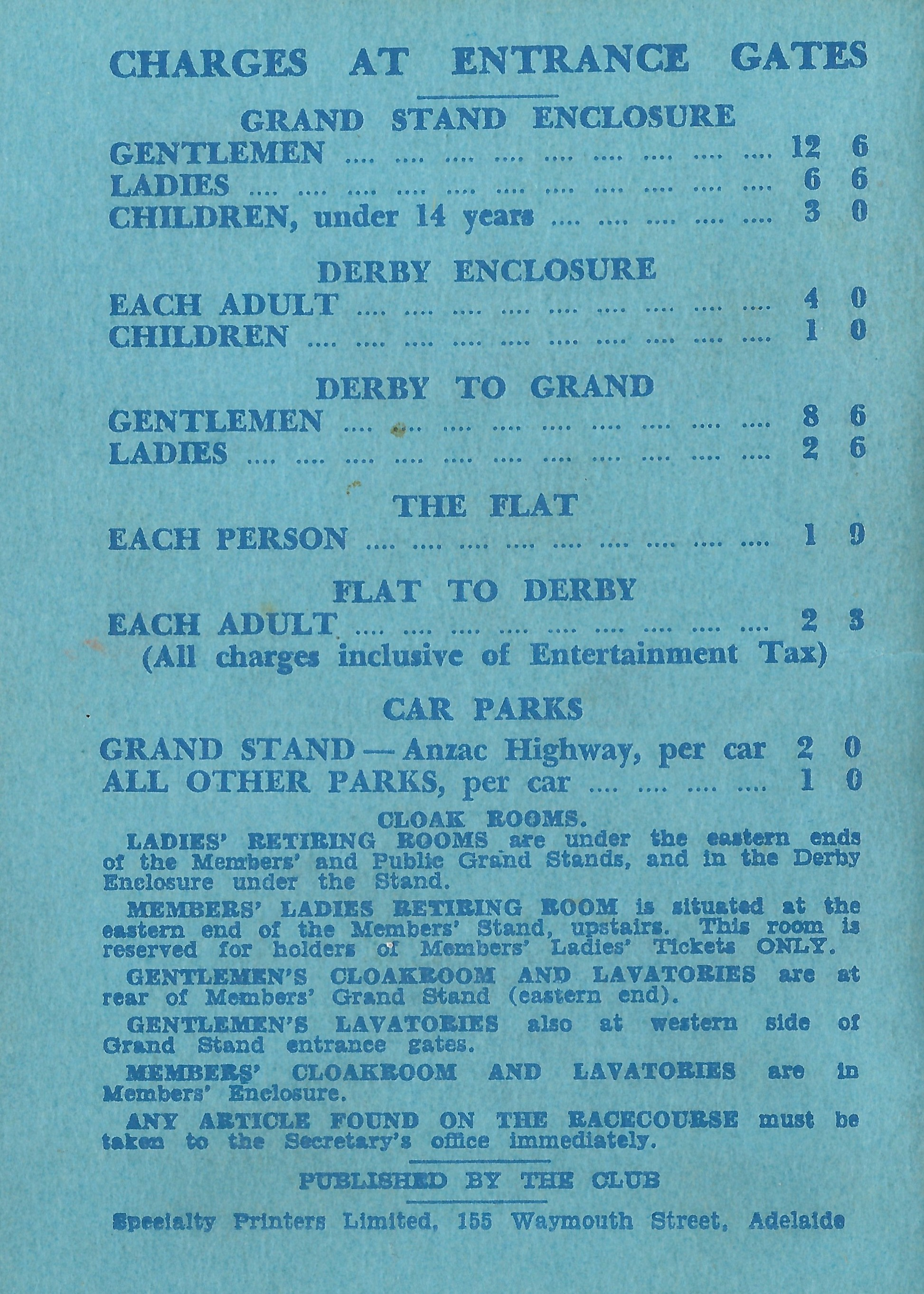
Back cover showing charges at the entrance gates

== Winners ==
The following are past winners of the race.

- 2026 - Wigmore
- 2025 - Femminile
- 2024 - Coco Sun
- 2023 - Dunkel
- 2022 - Jungle Magnate (Note: The 2022 winner Jungle Magnate was later exported to Hong Kong and renamed Beautyverse)
- 2021 - Explosive Jack
- 2020 – Russian Camelot
- 2019 – Qafila
- 2018 – Leicester (Note: The 2018 winner Leicester was later exported to Hong Kong and renamed Helene Leadingstar)
- 2017 – Volatile Mix
- 2016 – Howard Be Thy Name
- 2015 – Delicacy
- 2014 – Kushadasi
- 2013 – Escado
- 2012 – Zabeelionaire
- 2011 – Shadows In The Sun
- 2010 – Kidnapped
- 2009 – Rebel Raider
- 2008 – Zarita
- 2007 – Lazer Sharp
- 2006 – Testafiable
- 2005 – Tails Of Triomphe
- 2004 – Hard To Get
- 2003 – Mummify
- 2002 – Pantani
- 2001 – Big Pat
- 2000 – Blue Murder
- 1999 – Showella
- 1998 – Bulta
- 1997 – Markham
- 1996 – Cheviot
- 1995 – Count Chivas
- 1994 – Bullwinkle
- 1993 – Our Pompeii
- 1992 – Subzero
- 1991 – Shiva's Revenge
- 1990 – Diego
- 1989 – Sea Brigand
- 1988 – Celtic Spirit
- 1987 – Shark's Fin
- 1986 – French Cotton
- 1985 – Sir Zephyr
- 1984 – Mapperley Heights
- 1983 – ¶race not held
- 1982 – English Wonder
- 1981 – Brewery Boy
- 1980 – Tasman
- 1979 – Top Ware
- 1978 – Regal Jester
- 1977 – Stormy Rex
- 1976 – Vacuum
- 1975 – Prince Of All
- 1974 – Exalt's Pride
- 1973 – Sir Gerald
- 1972 – Dayana
- 1971 – Near Boy
- 1970 – Clear Prince
- 1969 – Paradigm
- 1968 – Dale Lace
- 1967 – Kembla
- 1966 – Peculator
- 1965 – Mission
- 1964 – Ziema
- 1963 – Hunting Horn
- 1962 – Royal Ziet
- 1961 – Gatum Gatum
- 1960 – Royal Chat
- 1959 – Crusty Bottle
- 1958 – Stormy Passage
- 1957 – Galloway
- 1956 – Auteuil
- 1955 – Ralkon
- 1954 – Pandie Star
- 1953 – Jovial Scot
- 1952 – Winemaker
- 1951 – Beau Cavalier
- 1950 – Toastmaster
- 1949 – Glenvue
- 1948 – Idle Banter
- 1947 – Basama
- 1946 – Conservator
- 1945 – Dauntless
- 1944 – Bluenor
- 1942–43 – † race not held
- 1941 – Ladmond
- 1940 – Waxwings
- 1939 – Lusson
- 1938 – Tempest
- 1937 – Golden Hill
- 1936 – Brave Lad
- 1935 – Beamish Boy
- 1934 – Alinura
- 1933 – Yultewirra
- 1932 – Traverse
- 1931 – Opera King
- 1930 – Induna
- 1929 – Hot Spring
- 1928 – Mount Of Olives
- 1927 – Marco Polo
- 1926 – Pindenda
- 1925 – Ethelton
- 1924 – Wycherley
- 1923 – King Of Mirth
- 1922 – Burnished
- 1921 – Leon
- 1920 – Pogonatos
- 1919 – Lord Setay
- 1918 – Stagegirl
- 1917 – Cosmos
- 1916 – Nevka
- 1915 – Perambulate
- 1914 – Fidelio
- 1913 – Kildalton
- 1912 – Puringa
- 1911 – Sanskrit
- 1910 – Sergius
- 1909 – The Greek
- 1908 – Tiercel
- 1907 – Palotta
- 1906 – Kismet II
- 1905 – Torah
- 1904 – Ganymedes
- 1903 – F.J.A.
- 1902 – Rienzi
- 1901 – Ritualist
- 1900 – Miltiades
- 1899 – Gunga Din
- 1898 – Hainault
- 1897 – Goodwill
- 1896 – Thunder Queen
- 1895 – Auraria
- 1894 – Monastery
- 1893 – Salient
- 1892 – Vakeel
- 1891 – Lady Rose
- 1890 – Cheddar
- 1885–89 – ‡race not held
- 1884 – Gratitude
- 1883 – Dirk Hatteraick
- 1882 – Guesswork
- 1881 – Topaz
- 1880 – The Assyrian
- 1879 – Pawnbroker
- 1878 – Viceroy
- 1877 – Irish Queen
- 1876 – Pride Of The Hills
- 1869–75 – race not held
- 1868 – Centurion
- 1867 – Regalia
- 1866 – Crusader
- 1865 – Tim Whiffler
- 1864 – ♯Queen Of Barossa
- 1864 – Lubra
- 1863 – Lord Of Isles
- 1862 – Riddle
- 1861 – Typo
- 1860 – Midnight

¶ Race usually scheduled to be run on second weekend in May was replaced in the racing calendar by Group 3 St Leger Stakes, run over a distance of 2600 metres.
† Race not held due to a ban on war time racing in the state.
‡ Race not held due to the Totalizator Repeal Act 1883.
♯ Race was raced twice in the same calendar year. The 1863–64 racing calendar set the date of the race as 1 January 1864. For the 1864–65 racing calendar the race was held on the first day of SAJC Summer Meet as the third race on 28 December 1864.

== See also ==
- Chairman's Stakes (SAJC)
- Euclase Stakes (Tobin Bronze Stakes)
- SA Fillies Classic
- Australasian Oaks
- List of Australian Group races
- Group races
