= D. C. McKay Stakes =

John Hawkes Stakes
- Class: Group 3
- Location: Morphettville Racecourse, South Australia
- Inaugurated: 1968
- Race type: Thoroughbred - Flat racing
- Sponsor: [Sportsbet] (2025 & 2026)

Race information
- Distance: 1,100 metres
- Surface: Turf
- Track: Left-handed
- Qualification: 3 year old and up
- Weight: Quality handicap
- Purse: A$150,000 (2026)

The John Hawkes Stakes registered as the D. C. McKay Stakes is a South Australian Jockey Club Group 3 Thoroughbred horse race for horses aged three years old and over, run as a quality handicap over a distance of 1100 metres at Morphettville Racecourse in Adelaide, Australia during the SAJC Autumn Carnival.

== History ==
The race is named in honour of former SAJC committeeman (elected originally in 1950) and horse owner Don McKay.

The race is considered a major prep lead up race for the Group 1 The Goodwood later in the Autumn Carnival.

The following horses have won the D. C. McKay–Goodwood double: Grey John (1969), Wise Virgin (1973), Puncheon (1976), Comaida Boy (1979), Lord Galaxy (1986), Boardwalk Angel (1989). Bomber Bill has won both races but not in the same year.

The race record time for the current distance is 1:02.10 set by Streetcar Magic in 2011.

=== Name ===
- 1968–1997 - D. C. McKay Stakes
- 1998–2004 - Honda Stakes
- 2005 - Malaysia Airlines Stakes
- 2006 - SATAB Have A Go Stakes
- 2007–2012 - evright.com Stakes
- 2013–2023 - D. C. McKay Stakes
- 2024 onwards - John Hawkes Stakes

=== Distance ===
- 1968–1972 - 6 furlongs (~1200 metres)
- 1973–1979 - 1200 metres
- 1980 - 1450 metres (race held at Victoria Park)
- 1981–1984 - 1200 metres
- 1985–2001 - 1100 metres
- 2002 - 1000 metres (race held at Victoria Park)
- 2003 onwards - 1100 metres.

=== Grade ===
- 1968–1979 - Principal Race
- 1980 onwards - Group 3

== Winners ==
The following are past winners of the race.

- 2026 - Grand Larceny
- 2025 - Watchme Win
- 2024 - Extremely Lucky
- 2023 - Savatoxl
- 2022 - Free Of Debt
- 2021 - Savatoxl
- 2020 - Behemoth (Note: In May 2020 Jungle Edge won the race by 1-3/4 lengths, but was disqualified in August 2020 due to the presence of the prohibited substance Meloxicam. Behemoth which ran second was declared the winner)
- 2019 - Despatch
- 2018 - Sprightly Lass
- 2017 - Karacatis
- 2016 - Super One
- 2015 - Thermal Current
- 2014 - Essay Raider
- 2013 - General Truce
- 2012 - Outlandish Lad
- 2011 - Streetcar Magic
- 2010 - Catapulted
- 2009 - I Am Invincible
- 2008 - Idalou
- 2007 - Here De Angels
- 2006 - Shablec
- 2005 - Bomber Bill
- 2004 - Paraca
- 2003 - Super Elegant
- 2002 - †Libidinious / Windigo
- 2001 - Sudurka
- 2000 - Perak Gold
- 1999 - Loafer
- 1998 - Toledo
- 1997 - Clang
- 1996 - Dr. Zackary
- 1995 - Latin Villa
- 1994 - Harkaway
- 1993 - Colebrook
- 1992 - Scornsome
- 1991 - Euclase
- 1990 - Medicine Kid
- 1989 - Boardwalk Angel
- 1988 - Beau George
- 1987 - Testimony
- 1986 - Lord Galaxy
- 1985 - Gold Kildare
- 1984 - Fire Stick
- 1983 - Penny Edition
- 1982 - Peta Gay
- 1981 - With Pleasure
- 1980 - Ducatoon
- 1979 - Comaida Boy
- 1978 - Comaida Boy
- 1977 - Ardroy
- 1976 - Puncheon
- 1975 - Miss Lockleys
- 1974 - King's Helmet
- 1973 - Wise Virgin
- 1972 - Eastern Court
- 1971 - King Stephen
- 1970 - Extinction
- 1969 - Grey John
- 1968 - King Stephen

† Dead heat

== See also ==
- Australasian Oaks
- SA Breeders Stakes
- Chairman's Stakes
- Queen Of The South Stakes
- Robert Sangster Stakes
- Tobin Bronze Stakes
- List of Australian Group races
- Group races
