= Euclase Stakes =

Tobin Bronze Stakes
- Class: Group 2
- Location: Morphettville Racecourse, South Australia
- Inaugurated: 1981
- Race type: Thoroughbred
- Sponsor: Sportsbet (2024-26)

Race information
- Distance: 1,200 metres
- Surface: Turf
- Track: Left-handed
- Qualification: Three-year-olds
- Weight: Set weights colts and geldings – 57 1/2 kg fillies – 55 1/2 kg
- Purse: $250,000 (2026)

The Tobin Bronze Stakes, registered as the Euclase Stakes is a South Australian Jockey Club Group 2 Thoroughbred horse race for three-year-olds, at set weights, over a distance of 1200 metres, held at Morphettville Racecourse in Adelaide, Australia during the SAJC Autumn Carnival.

== History ==
The registered race name is named after Euclase, who won this race in 1991 and later went on to win the SAJC Goodwood Handicap the following year.

=== Grade ===
- 1981–1985 was a Listed Race
- 1986–1990 was a Group 3
- 1991 onwards Group 2

=== Name ===
- 1981–1987 - Great Western Plate
- 1988–1989 - Carrington Blush Plate
- 1990–2000 - Angus Brut Classic
- 2001–2011 - Yallambee Classic
- 2012–2013 - Centrebet Classic
- 2014 - Sportingbet Classic
- 2015 - William Hill Stakes
- 2016 - Ubet Stakes
- 2017–2020 - Euclase Stakes
- 2021 onwards - Tobin Bronze Stakes

== Winners ==
Past winners of the race include the following.

- 2026 - Tycoon Star
- 2025 - Reserve Bank
- 2024 - Skybird
- 2023 - Royal Merchant
- 2022 - Seradess
- 2021 - Beau Rossa
- 2020 - Xilong
- 2019 - Valour Road
- 2018 - I'll Have A Bit
- 2017 - Sweet Sherry
- 2016 - Faatinah
- 2015 - Nicoscene
- 2014 - Miracles Of Life
- 2013 - Lonhspresso
- 2012 - Go The Knuckle
- 2011 - Shrapnel
- 2010 - Majestic Music
- 2009 - Champagne Harmony
- 2008 - Diplomatic Force
- 2007 - Universal Queen
- 2006 - Magically
- 2005 - Honalee
- 2004 - Danabaa
- 2003 - Toast Of The Coast
- 2002 - Troubles
- 2001 - Ateates
- 2000 - Honour The Name
- 1999 - Close Your Eyes
- 1998 - Show No Emotion
- 1997 - Blazing Reality
- 1996 - Masked Party
- 1995 - Sword
- 1994 - Elegancy
- 1993 - Never Undercharge
- 1992 - Dapper's Hope
- 1991 - Euclase
- 1990 - Rechabite
- 1989 - Vitalic
- 1988 - Change Of Habit
- 1987 - Northern Copy
- 1986 - Sica Fortune
- 1985 - Rich Fields Lad
- 1984 - Mighty Avenger
- 1983 - Mighty Manitou
- 1982 - Warrior King
- 1981 - Apollo's Flame

== See also ==
- Australasian Oaks (Schweppes Oaks)
- SA Breeders Stakes
- Chairman's Stakes
- John Hawkes Stakes
- Queen Of The South Stakes
- Robert Sangster Stakes
- SA Fillies Classic
- South Australian Derby
- List of Australian Group races
- Group races
