= Australasian Oaks =

Horse race in Adelaide, South Australia

- Class: Group 1
- Location: Morphettville Racecourse, Adelaide, South Australia
- Inaugurated: 1982
- Race type: Thoroughbred
- Sponsor: Sportsbet (2024-26)

Race information
- Distance: 2,000 metres
- Surface: Turf
- Track: Left-handed
- Qualification: Three year old fillies
- Weight: Set Weights
- Purse: $1,000,000 (2026)

The Australasian Oaks, is a South Australian Jockey Club Group 1 Thoroughbred horse race for three-year-old fillies at Set Weights run over a distance of 2000 metres at Morphettville Racecourse, Adelaide, Australia in the SAJC Autumn Carnival.

== History ==
The inaugural race was won by Rose Of Kingston who went on to become the Australian Horse of the Year and finished her racing career with ten wins including three Group 1 races that included the Australian Derby. She was also the Australasian Champion Three-Year-Old Filly and Australasian Champion Older Mare in 1982 and later was a successful broodmare.

=== Name ===
- 1982–2005 - Australasian Oaks
- 2006–2020 - Schweppes Oaks
- 2021 onwards - Australasian Oaks

=== Grade ===
- 1982 - Grade 3
- 1983 onwards - Grade 1

=== Distance ===
The distance of the race is 2000 metres, but due to the track conditions the running rail is sometimes moved and this changes the official distance of the race.

- 1982–1992 - 2000 metres
- 1993 - 2014 metres
- 1994–2000 - 2000 metres
- 2001 - 2020 metres
- 2002 - 2000 metres
- 2003 - 2025 metres
- 2004 - 2024 metres
- 2005 - 2031 metres
- 2006 - 2020 metres
- 2007–2008 - 2000 metres
- 2009 - 2005 metres
- 2010 - 2006 metres
- 2011 - 2008 metres
- 2012–2016 - 2000 metres
- 2017 - 2010 metres

=== Other venues ===
The race was run in 2000 at Victoria Park.

=== Records ===
The 2007 winner Anamato holds the race record time of 2:02.20.

Most wins by a trainer: 4

- Bart Cummings – 1983, 1989, 1993, 1994
- Lee Freedman – 1986, 1991, 1992, 2000

== Winners ==
The following are past winners of the race.

- 2026 - Panova
- 2025 - Benagil
- 2024 - Vibrant Sun
- 2023 - Affaire A Suivre
- 2022 - Glint Of Hope
- 2021 - Media Award
- 2020 - Toffee Tongue
- 2019 - Princess Jenni
- 2018 - Sopressa
- 2017 - Egg Tart
- 2016 - Abbey Marie
- 2015 - Delicacy
- 2014 - May's Dream
- 2013 - Maybe Discreet
- 2012 - Invest
- 2011 - Lights Of Heaven
- 2010 - Small Minds
- 2009 - Gallica
- 2008 - Zarita
- 2007 - Anamato
- 2006 - Marju Snip
- 2005 - Irish Darling
- 2004 - Rinky Dink
- 2003 - Sound Action
- 2002 - Tully Thunder
- 2001 - Tempest Morn
- 2000 - Grand Echezeaux
- 1999 - Episode
- 1998 - La Volta
- 1997 - Minegold
- 1996 - Leica Smile
- 1995 - Yelgun Dawn
- 1994 - Tristalove
- 1993 - Our Tristalight
- 1992 - Gatherneaux
- 1991 - Mannerism
- 1990 - Belle Chanson
- 1989 - Stapleton Lass
- 1988 - Imposera
- 1987 - Send Me An Angel
- 1986 - Miss Clipper
- 1985 - Centaurea
- 1984 - Use The Space
- 1983 - Royal Regatta
- 1982 - Rose Of Kingston

== See also ==
- Chairman's Stakes (SAJC)
- D. C. McKay Stakes (John Hawkes Stakes)
- Queen Of The South Stakes
- Robert Sangster Stakes
- SA Breeders Stakes
- SA Fillies Classic
- South Australian Derby
- Euclase Stakes (Tobin Bronze Stakes)
- List of Australian Group races
- Group races
