= Morphettville Racecourse =

Horse racing race track in Adelaide, South Australia

- View of the racecourse and winners' circle from the grandstand
- Interactive map of Morphettville Racecourse
- Location: Morphettville, Adelaide, South Australia
- Coordinates: 34°58′41″S 138°32′34″E
- Owned by: South Australian Jockey Club
- Date opened: 3 January 1876

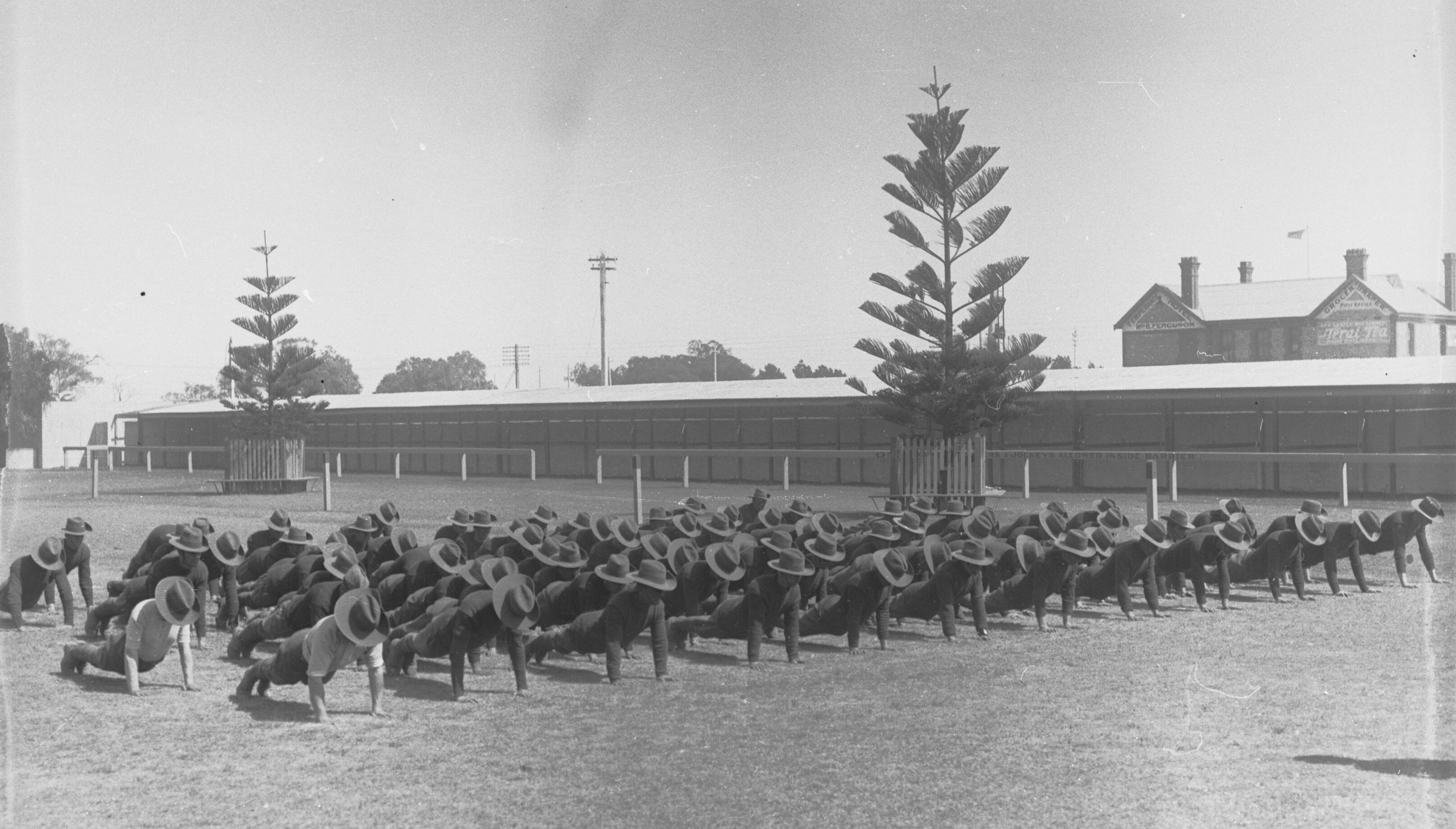
World War I Expeditionary Force soldiers undergoing physical training at Morphettville Racecourse

Morphettville Racecourse is the main horse racing course for the Australian state of South Australia, incorporating two separate tracks. Home to the South Australian Jockey Club, it is situated in the Adelaide suburb of Morphettville, 10 kilometres (6.2 miles) from the Adelaide city centre.

== History ==
After years of using grounds at the East Parklands ("The Old Adelaide Racecourse", later known as Victoria Park), rented from the Adelaide City Council, a group which became the South Australian Jockey Club began using a racecourse (Thebarton Racecourse or "The Butchers' Course") at present-day Mile End on grazing land owned by E. M. Bagot and Gabriel Bennett near the River Torrens from 1859 to 1869, when the course was abandoned due to insufficient patronage. After five or six years of existence in name only, the SAJC acquired, thanks to the generosity of Sir Thomas Elder, its own freehold property at Morphettville ("The Bay of Biscay Course") and held its first meeting there on 3 January 1876. A breakaway group, which became the Adelaide Racing Club, continued to hold race meetings at the Old Racecourse.

In 2008, first Victoria Park, and then in 2009 Cheltenham Park, were discontinued as racing facilities; now Adelaide race meetings are conducted only at Morphettville.

== Race courses ==
=== Main ===
The course proper at Morphettville is a long, flat course with a circumference of 2,307 metres (7,569 ft). The track is 32 metres (105 ft) wide and features wide turns with a camber of 4 per cent. A retractable winning post with hydraulics enables the SAJC to alternate the running of races with minimal damage to both tracks, especially with races taking place mid-week and increased racing through the winter months. Installed in 2009, it is a world first.

=== Secondary ===
The second track, known as "The Parks", was officially opened in June 2009. The Morphettville Parks track has a circumference of 2100 metres (6900 feet), and the track is 25 metres (82 feet) wide with a 5 per cent camber on the turns. A chute through the centre of the course that runs between the 850‑metre and 1550‑metre points provides for 1250, 1300 and 1400 metre starts.

== Wetlands ==
The Morphettville Racecourse Wetland was a joint initiative of the Patawalonga Catchment Water Management Board and the South Australian Jockey Club. It was constructed by the Board and the Jockey Club during 2001 and 2002. The wetland covers an area of 3.5 hectares (8.6 acres) in the middle of the racecourse on the corner of Anzac Highway and Morphett Road. Costing $2.4 million to construct, it includes 100,000 plants. The soil excavated was used to raise the level of the racecourse track.

The main grandstand

The catchment area for the wetland includes stormwater flow from two drains in Bray Street, south of the racecourse. Water enters a sediment pond where floating litter is collected in a net and large materials settle out. The water is then piped into the wetland, where it travels through a series of deep and shallow marshes. An aquifer storage and recovery system has been constructed at the wetland. The water flowing out of the wetland is ideal for irrigation as it has very low salinity. During winter months, water is captured and pumped into a tertiary limestone aquifer below the racecourse. During the summer months, the water in the aquifer is recovered and used for irrigation. Up to 600 megalitres of water a year is recharged into the aquifer, which exceeds the amount required to irrigate the racecourse.

== Access ==
The racecourse is just off Anzac Highway, on Morphett Road. Entry is via Morphett Road entrance or Tramway entrance. The Glenelg Tram operates throughout the day from North Terrace and Victoria Square through to Moseley Square (Glenelg), stopping adjacent to the Tramway entrance. A taxi rank is located inside the members' car park, where taxis pick up and drop off throughout the day. Car parking is also available.

Preceding station	Adelaide Metro	Following station
Morphettville: Stop 12
Marion Road towards Royal Adelaide Hospital, Adelaide Entertainment Centre or Festival Plaza	Glenelg tram line (closed outside of the CBD until 2026)	Morphett Road towards Moseley Square

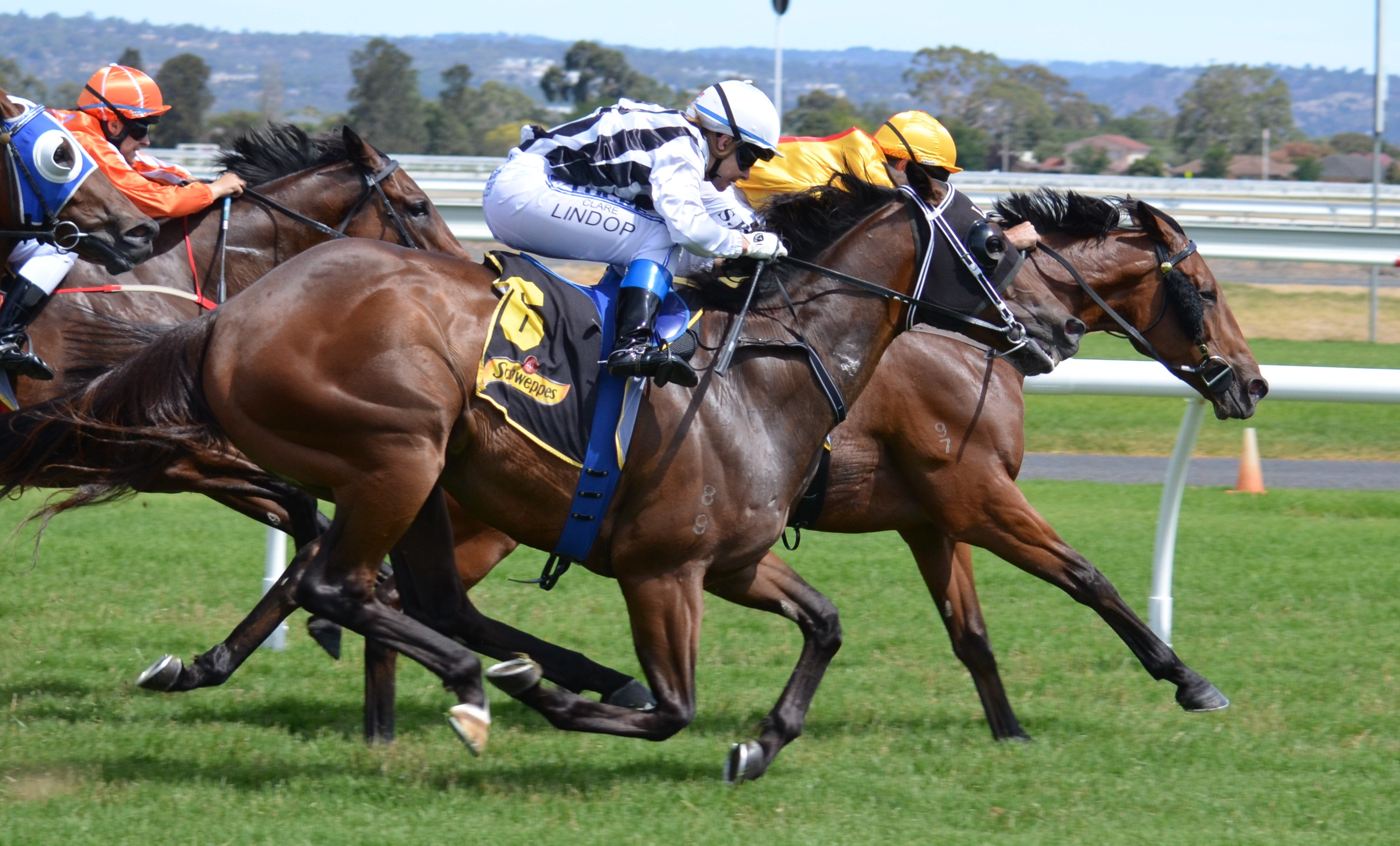
Clare Lindop rides Essay Raider to win the 2013 Schweppes Handicap at Morphettville

== 1954 racebook ==
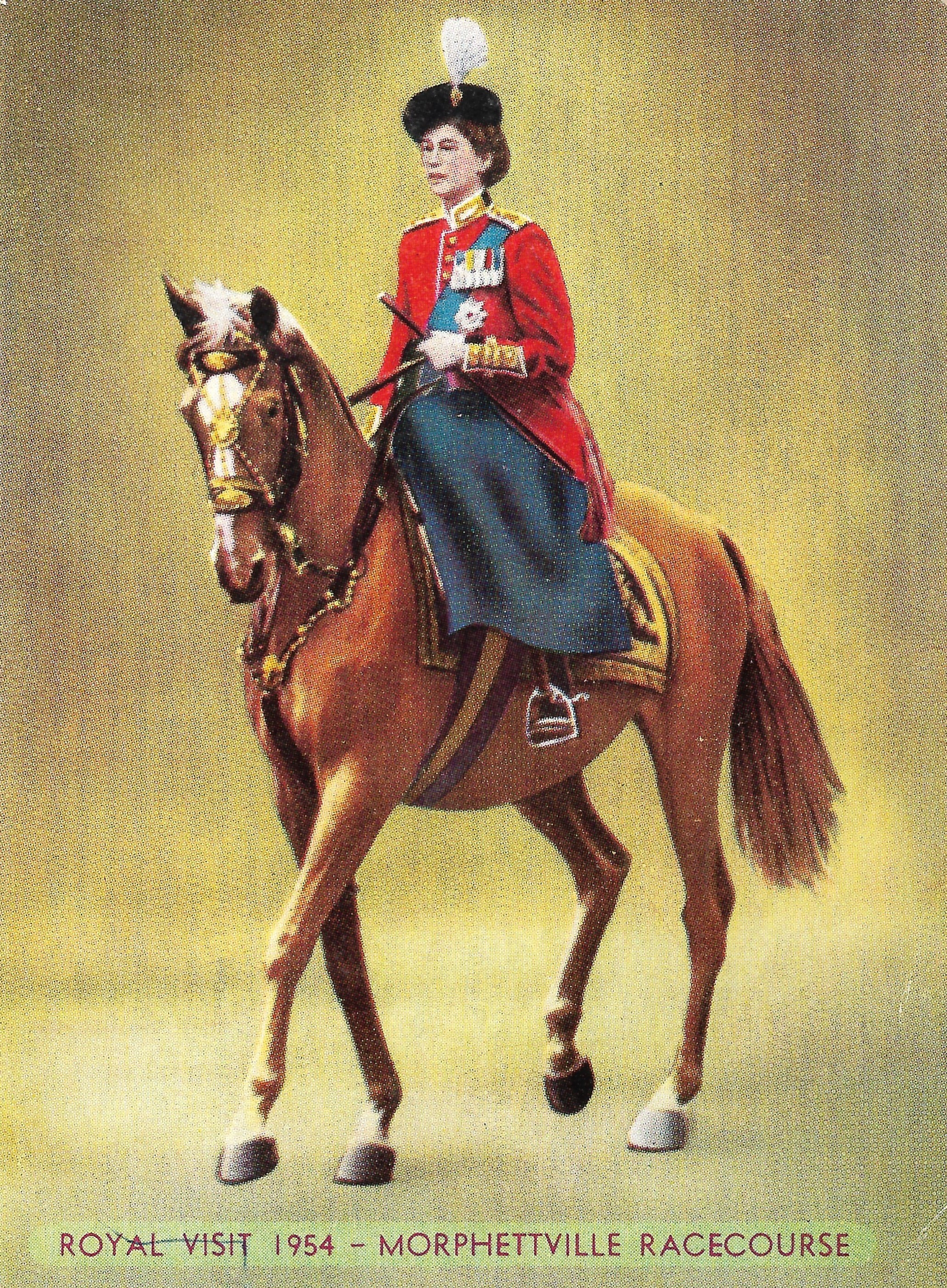
1954 SAJC Queens Cup racebook front cover

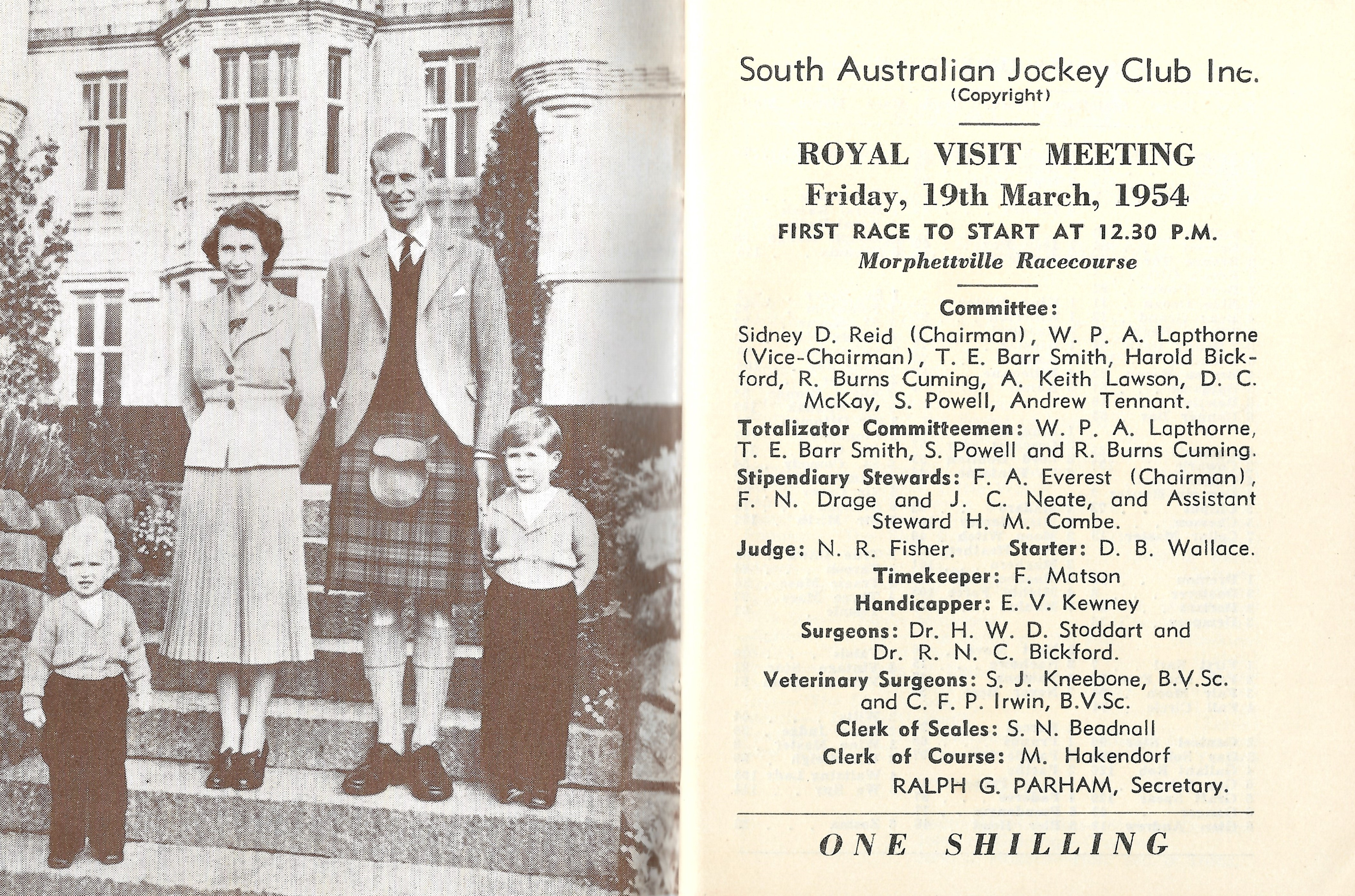
1954 SAJC Queens Cup showing raceday officials

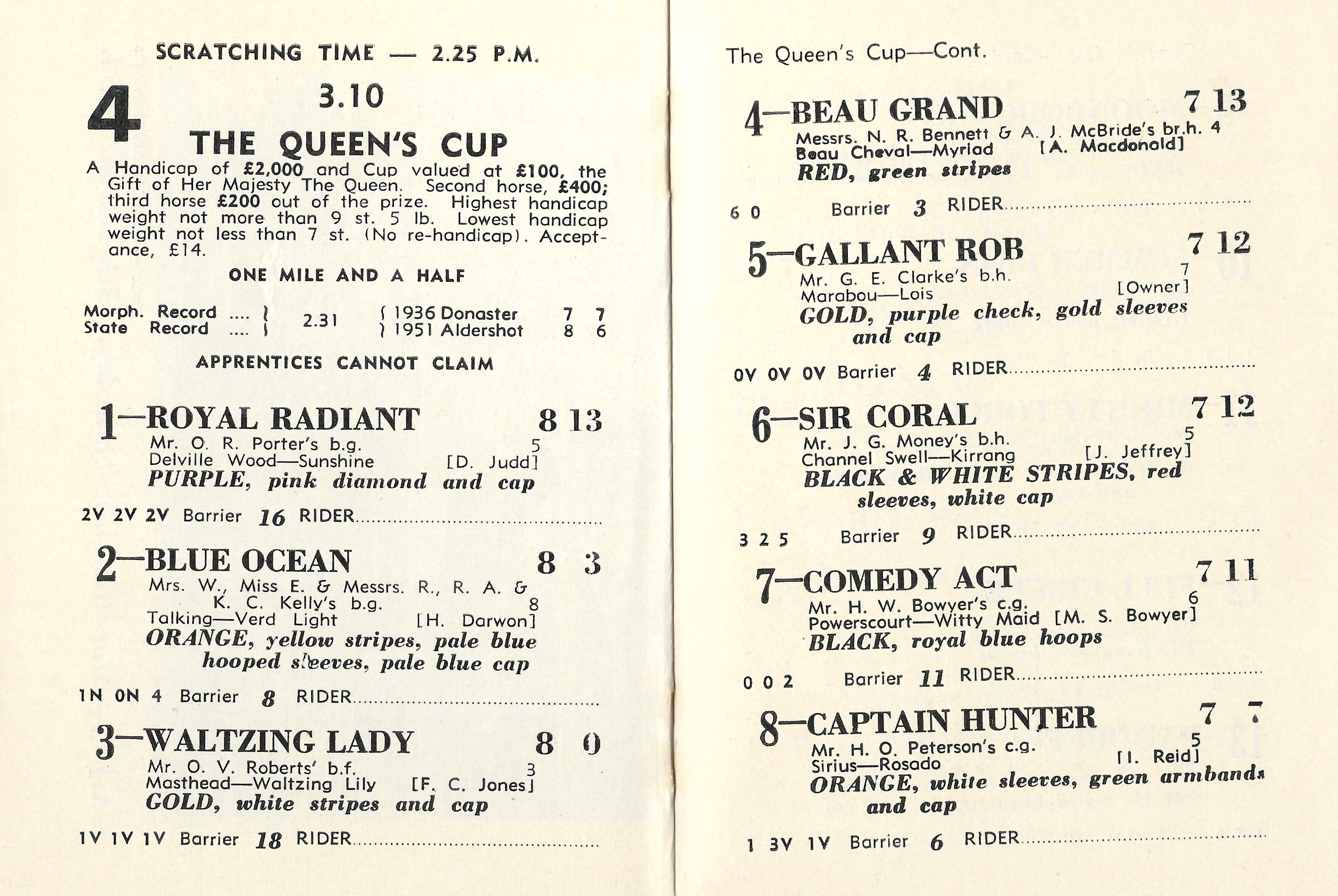
1954 SAJC Queens Cup showing the winner, Sir Coral

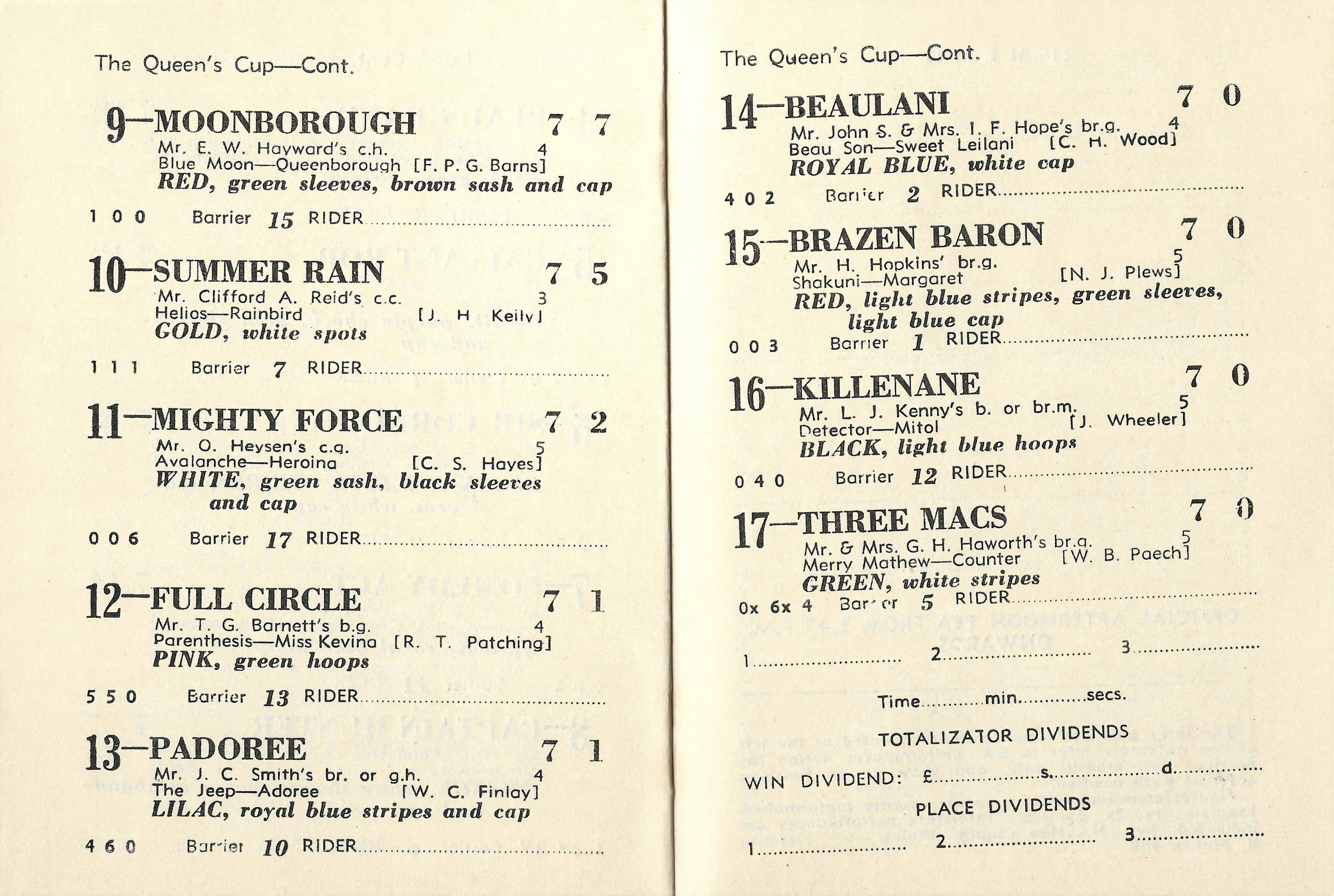
1954 SAJC Queens Cup starters and results

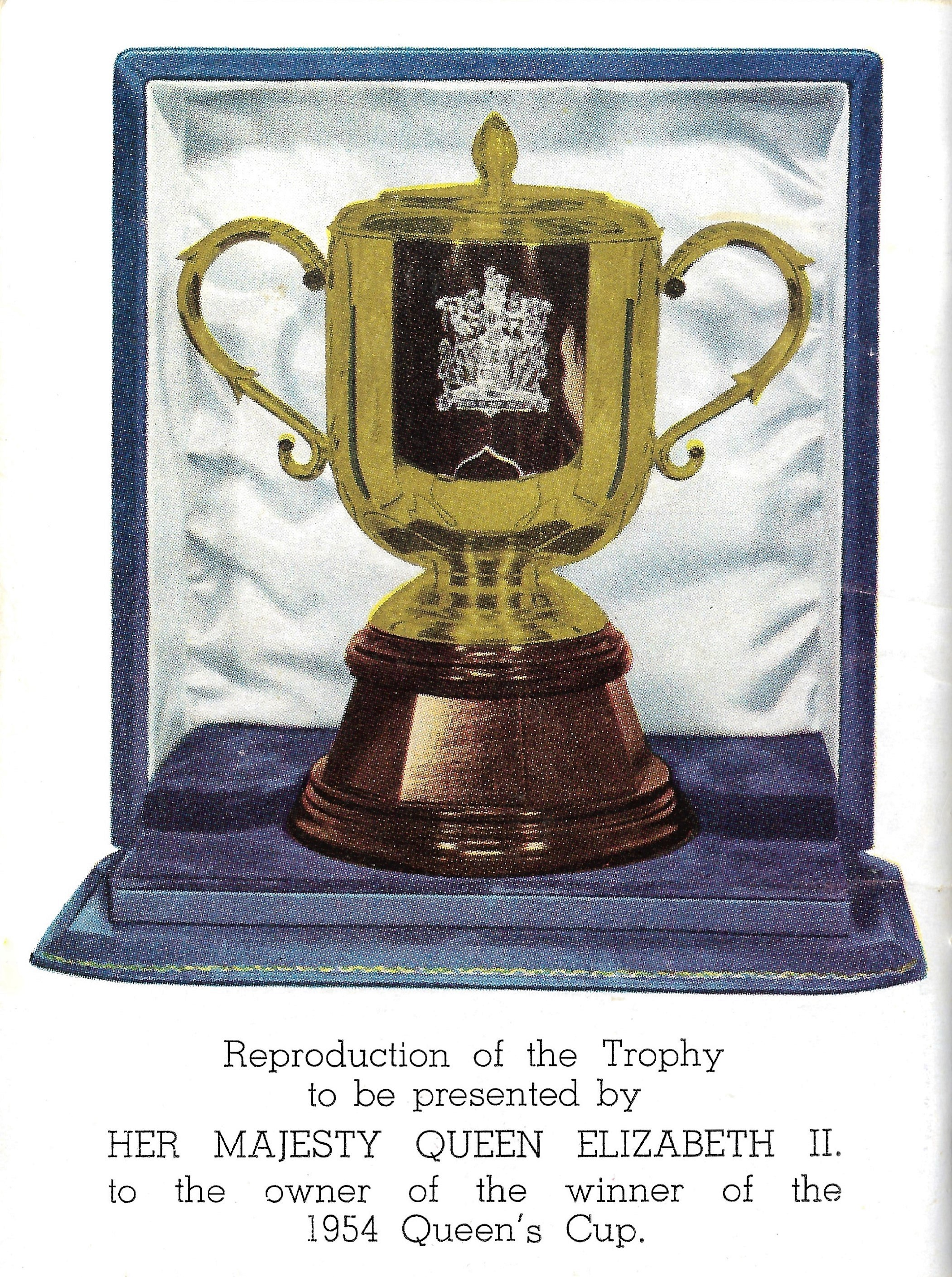
The 1954 Queens Cup trophy

== Races ==
The following is a list of group races which are run at Morphettville Racecourse.

Grp	Race Name	Age	Sex	Weight	Distance	Month
1	Australasian Oaks	3YO	Fillies	sw	2000	April
1	The Goodwood	Open	Open	sw+p	1200	April
1	Robert Sangster Stakes	3YO+	Fillies and Mares	sw	1200	April
1	South Australian Derby	3YO	Open	sw	2500	April
2	Adelaide Cup	Open	Open	hcp	3200	March
2	Yallambee Classic	3YO	Open	sw	1200	March
2	Queen of the South Stakes	3YO+	Fillies and Mares	sw	1600	May
3	SA Fillies Classic	3YO	Fillies	sw	2500	April
3	Lord Reims Stakes	Open	Open	sw+p	2600	March
3	D.C. McKay Stakes	Open	Open	qlty	1100	May
3	Robert A. Lee Stakes	Open	Open	qlty	1600	May
3	SAJC Breeders' Stakes	2YO	Open	sw	1200	February
3	SAJC Sires' Produce Stakes	2YO	Open	sw	1600	May
3	SAJC Spring Stakes	Open	Open	wfa	1200	September
3	SAJC Chairman's Stakes	3YO	Colts, Geldings and Fillies	sw	2000	April
3	The Jansz	2YO	Open	sw+p	1200	May
3	R.N. Irwin Stakes	3YO+	Open	wfa	1100	March
3	Proud Miss Stakes	3YO+	Fillies and Mares	sw+p	1200	April
3	Auraria Stakes	3YO	Fillies	sw+p	1800	April
3	Queen's Cup	Open	Open	hcp	2500	May
