= Sopressa (horse) =

Australian-bred Thoroughbred racehorse

- Sire: So You Think
- Grandsire: High Chaparral
- Dam: Hidden Strings
- Damsire: Weasel Clause
- Sex: Mare
- Foaled: 31 October 2014
- Country: Australia
- Colour: Bay
- Owner: DJ Molloy
- Trainer: Darren Weir (Sep 17-Mar 19); Ciaron Maher and David Eustace(Mar 19-)
- Record: 28-4-6-2
- Earnings: A$686,970

Major wins
- Auraria Stakes (G3)(2018); Schweppes Oaks (G1) (2018)
- Last updated on 19 April 2020

Sopressa (foaled 31 October 2014) is a Thoroughbred racehorse trained and bred in Australia. She won the Schweppes Oaks, a Group One race, and has won over six hundred thousand dollars.

== Career ==
Sopressa had her first race at Geelong on 3 September 2017, coming third and winning $3200. She competed in three further races in this campaign, finishing 5th, 2nd and 3rd.

After a 106-day spell, she returned, contesting two further races before breaking her maiden on 7 March 2018 at Kyneton.

After a short spell, Sopressa took part in her first listed race at Morphettville on 7 April. Starting as $4.20 favourite, she "didn't have much luck", finishing 7th. A fortnight later, she won the Auraria Stakes by 4 lengths. Trainer Darren Weir said, "She got a terrific ride from Harry [Coffey] and she showed her strengths really late in the race when she was getting to the final furlong over 1800m, she was very strong."

Sopressa won her first Group 1 in the Schweppes Oaks two weeks later. Quick out of the gates, she settled 5th on the rail and made her move on the home bend to win by less than half a length. Jockey Harry Coffey, also winning his first group 1, said, "When you win a race like the Oaks, it becomes clear how special it is. I don't know how many messages I have had on social media." Weir said of his ride, "If he had done one thing wrong, he would've got beaten, it was that close."

Between August and October 2018, Sopressa contested 4 events, never finishing in the first half of the field.

In February 2019, trainer Darren Weir was banned for four years for the use of taser-like devices on his horses to improve performance. Sopressa was transferred to trainers Ciaron Maher and David Eustace.

A five-month spell saw Sopressa return in the Group 3 Matron Stakes in March, finishing 11th of 12. A fortnight later saw a drop in class to a bm90, with Sopressa finishing 5th. In the next four months she contested seven further events without a win, though she did come second in the Grafton Cup and Queen's Cup.

On 27 July, Sopressa won $100,000 in the Vobis Gold Stayers. Trainer Maher announced she was going to the breeding barn after this final run. "She takes a bit of maintenance but the muscle guys and manipulators have done a really good job with her. She’s a big, raw mare that gets a few little niggles and that was a great way to finish off." However, she then raced at Flemington a fortnight later.
