= South Australian Jockey Club =

Horse racing organisation in South Australia

South Australian Jockey Club is the principal race club in South Australia.

== First racing events ==
The first horse racing events in South Australia took place at a well-attended picnic meeting held over 1 and 2 January 1838. In August 1838, riding his grey gelding Charley, Fred Handcock won the first steeplechase event ever held in South Australia. Various racing events (including match races) continued throughout the 1840s, many under Jockey Club rules, but without a regulating body.

== Foundations of the S.A.J.C. ==
The first incarnation of the South Australian Jockey Club (S.A.J.C.) was in 1849, under the aegis of the governor, Sir Henry E. F. Young, and its first meeting was set for 3–4 April 1849 but eventually held 10–11 April. James Chambers was Clerk of the Course and Thomas Shayle secretary.

A race meeting was held by the club at Brighton on 14 February 1850. Edward Strike was Clerk of the Course and Thomas Shayle was Hon. Sec.

The Gawler Town Races, organised by S.A.J.C., was held 28–29 April 1851 but poorly patronised.

Following several successful race meetings organised by E. M. Bagot and Gabriel Bennett on their grazing property south of Henley Beach Road, Thebarton (where Mile End is today), the first being 6–8 January 1859, and a series of preliminary discussions held in June and July 1861, a new committee was formed, whose members included Sir James Fisher (president), E. M. Bagot, Gabriel Bennett, W. K. Simms, P. B. Coglin (starter) and William Blackler, with James Chambers as judge. They settled on the Thebarton track as their racecourse, with the first club programme held 1–3 January 1862. The Thebarton course, dubbed the "Butchers' Course", grew increasingly unpopular with both the racing fraternity and the racegoing public. It was difficult of access compared with the "Old Course" on the East Parklands; moreover it could be unpleasant (depending on wind direction) on account of smells emanating from nearby animal processing industries on the banks of the Torrens. It was, however, supplied gratis by Bagot and Bennett, whereas P. B. Coglin, who had the lease for the "Old Course", demanded £1,500 for its use. A notable race held in this period was the 1865 Grand Steeplechase won by the horseman-poet Adam Lindsay Gordon on Cadger.

The club folded in 1869 through bankruptcy then was revived in 1873 after its debts were paid by a consortium of businessmen.

== The second S.A.J.C. ==
The club was re-formed in 1875 with Stewards: Sir John Morphett, Sir Henry Ayers, John Crozier M.L.C., W. Cavenagh, MP., and Philip Levi. The committee consisted of: G. Bennett, W. K. Simms, MP. Judge: Mr E. M. Bagot. Starters: Henry Hughes and G. Bennett. Clerk of the Course: J. Boase. The first handicapping committee consisted of W. B. Rounsevell, G. Bennett and H. Hughes. Longtime handicapper Henry Hughes was succeeded by his son William Charles Hughes.

Seth Ferry and W. H. Formby (c. 1818–1892) were commissioned to investigate the suitability of (later Sir) Thomas Elder's property at Morphettville, then marshland known as "Bay of Biscay Flat" (alluding to its unpleasant clay soil), for a racecourse. They reported that the area was susceptible to flooding from the nearby Brownhill Creek, and that it was littered with dips and gulleys, but both problems could be overcome with earthworks and there was no shortage of sand nearby, and in other ways was an ideal location. In March 1874 the South Australian Jockey Club Company (Limited) was founded with Simeon Barnard as secretary and share capital of £1000; Ferry was one of the original purchases of a £5 or £10 share. Elder leased at peppercorn rental, later donated, the 160 acres (65 ha) property on the Glenelg railway (later tram) line, near the Morphett Arms Hotel, to be known as the "South Australian Course" or "Elder Course" (and to the less charitable, the "Bay of Biscay course"), to the company. The directors elected at the first general meeting of the Company were Sir Henry Ayers, Sir John Morphett, Thomas Elder, John Crozier, R. C. Baker, Philip Levi, Joseph Gilbert, E. W. Pitts, and H. B. Hughes, all highly influential gentlemen and racing enthusiasts. The company promptly spent the subscribed money establishing racing facilities at Morphettville. The course was laid out by R. C. Bagot, first secretary of the Victoria Racing Club. The course was partly walled in, a ladies' lawn laid, and a grand stand, judge's box, stewards' stand, telegraph office, loose boxes erected.

On 7 August 1874 the club signed the lease of the course from the company for one year, with a right of renewal from year to year for five years at a rental of 6 per cent. on the outlay. Their first race meeting was held there on 23 September 1875? 3 January 1876? Due to the track being waterlogged their May 1875 meeting had to be held at the "Old Adelaide Racecourse" (later known as Victoria Park), hired from the Adelaide City Council at a cost of £40. The sum of £1,000 was found to be inadequate and the company decided to increase the capital to £7,000. The company then sought from Sir Thomas Elder, and received, conversion of the peppercorn rental to freehold purchase of the Morphettville land so they had the ability to borrow against the value of the land.

A breakaway group, formed in 1870 following collapse of the first S.A.J.C., had acquired at minimal cost, but with substantial obligations as to improvements, the lease to the "Old Course" from the Council. They became in 1879 the Adelaide Racing Club, and until amalgamation of the two rival clubs continued to hold race meetings there.

In 1880 use of the totalizator on South Australian racecourses was legalized (or more correctly exempted from certain provisions of the Gaming Act), and Barnard and R. C. Baker introduced a simple totalizator, which was conducted on a large sheet of cardboard in the secretary's office. A commercial totalizator, from Hill & Schinnerling of Melbourne, was trialled in 1879, but appears to have gone no further. After a problem which arose in 1881 when a winning horse, Dan O'Dea's D.O.D., paid out £836/16s to its only backer, a Woolford totalizator (for Adelaide inventor Robert Woolford) was installed. It worked admirably until 1921, when it was replaced, and whose only drawback was that it did not show the grand total invested for each race. The "tote" was a success but the S.A.J.C. did not prosper as expected, largely due to competition from the Adelaide Racing Club. Then in 1883 Parliament passed the Totalizator Repeal Act, which had the immediate effect of making South Australian racecourses much less profitable. The club continued to lease the course, and to conduct meetings, but with reduced prizes, patronage and profits. This coincided with the severe South Australian drought of 1884–1886 and a consequent financial downturn. In December 1884 the South Australian Jockey Club Company (Limited) was voluntarily wound up, with Barnard appointed liquidator, and carried out the secretarial duties of the S.A.J.C. in an honorary capacity. Morphettville racecourse was placed in the hands of the Queensland Mortgage Company, and fell into a state of disrepair. The club, whose finances were in a precarious state, in desperation ran the 1885 Adelaide Cup at Flemington. The company was then forced to relinquish the Morphettville property to the Queensland Mortgage Company and the club was defunct.

The S.A.J.C went into recess and held no meetings for four years. Barnard acted as honorary secretary.

== The current S.A.J.C. ==
In 1888 Parliament reversed its ban on the Totalizator. The property was then purchased for £8,000 by T. F. Wigley, R. B. Pell, and Sylvester Browne. Browne subsequently purchased Pell's interest and in July 1889 Wigley and Browne placed the racecourse on the market in order to close the partnership; it was purchased by Browne.

A. O. Whitington, who had previously had a supervisory role at race meetings, and whose employers John and William Pile were prominent racegoers, was approached by T. F. Wigley to help revive the club, and Whitington convened a meeting in the arbitration room of the Stock Exchange in Pirie street on 19 September 1888, presided by Sir Richard Baker. Those present included Sir Richard Baker, Tom Barnfield, William Blackler, Irwin A. Bleechmore, P. Frederick Bonnin, Dr. Thomas Cawley, Hugh Chambers, John Deeney, Daniel Dunlevie, James A. Ellery, William Filgate, James Hay, Ernest W. Howard, Henry Hughes, Philip Lee, W. B. Rounsevell, A. Simms, H. Simms, W. K. Simms and T. F. Wigley. The outcome of the meeting was that Whitington was appointed club secretary, Baker, Rounsevell, Wigley, Pile, Chambers, Bonnin, and Ellery were appointed committee members, and agreed to lease the Morphettville course from Browne for £900 per annum with a right to purchase after four years for £12,000. Racing by the S.A.J.C. was revived at Morphettville on 1 January 1889, despite a downpour.

The S.A.J.C. continued to lease the course until 1895 when, thanks to "the tote" and Whitington's careful stewardship, the S.A.J.C. was able to exercise its "right to purchase" from Browne the freehold was acquired by Sir R. C. Baker, W. B. Rounsevell, William Pile, H. Chambers, P. F. Bonnin, Fred Ayers (son of Henry Ayers), and J. A. Ellery, who constituted the S.A.J.C. committee, so at last the course was the property of the S.A.J.C.

In 2008, firstly Victoria Park, and then in 2009 Cheltenham Park were discontinued as racing facilities in South Australia, and now races are conducted at one metropolitan course: Morphettville. Major races include the Group 1 Goodwood Handicap (1200m), Group 2 Adelaide Cup (3200m), Group 1 SA Derby (2500m) and the Group 1 Australasian Oaks (2000m).

== Races ==
The following is a list of group races conducted by the SAJC.

Grp	Race Name	Age	Sex	Weight	Distance
1	Australasian Oaks	3YO	Fillies	sw	2020
1	Goodwood Handicap	3YO+	Open	hcp	1200
1	Robert Sangster Stakes	3YO+	F&M	sw	1200
1	South Australian Derby	3YO	Open	sw	2500
2	Adelaide Cup	3YO+	Open	hcp	3200
2	Yallambee Classic	3YO	Open	sw	1200
2	Queen Of The South Stakes	3YO+	F&M	sw	1600
3	SA Fillies Classic	3YO	Fillies	sw	2500
3	Auraria Stakes	3YO	Fillies	sw+p	1800
3	Lord Reims Stakes	3YO+	Open	hcp	2600
3	D.C. McKay Stakes	3YO+	Open	hcp	1100
3	R. N. Irwin Stakes	3YO+	Open	wfa	1100
3	Robert A. Lee Stakes	3YO+	Open	hcp	1600
3	SAJC Breeders' Stakes	2YO	Open	sw	1200
3	Queen's Cup	3YO+	Open	hcp	2000
3	SAJC Sires' Produce Stakes	2YO	Open	sw	1600
3	SAJC Spring Stakes	3YO+	Open	wfa	1200
3	SAJC Chairman's Stakes	3YO	Open	sw	2000
3	The Jansz	2YO	Open	sw	1200
3	Proud Miss Stakes	3YO+	F&M	sw+p	1200
