= Storm Queen (horse) =

Australian-bred thoroughbred racehorse

- Sire: Coronation Boy (IRE)
- Grandsire: Nasrullah (ENG)
- Dam: Storm Gleam (AUS)
- Damsire: Sun Storm (GB)
- Sex: Mare
- Foaled: 1963
- Country: Australia
- Colour: Bay
- Trainer: Bart Cummings
- Record: 20: 13-2-1
- Earnings: A$101,000

Major wins
- SAJC Breeders' Stakes (1966); VRC Sires' Produce Stakes (1966); Golden Slipper Stakes (1966); Champagne Stakes (1966); Moonee Valley Stakes (1966); Edward Manifold Stakes (1966); Caulfield Guineas (1966); George Adams Handicap (1966); Lightning Stakes (1967)

Honours
- Storm Queen Stakes
- Last updated on 13 October 2017

Storm Queen was a notable Australian thoroughbred racehorse.

A bay daughter of Coronation Boy from the mare Storm Gleam, she was foaled in 1963 and was trained throughout her career by Bart Cummings.

Her racetrack debut ended in defeat, but it was followed by eight successive wins in her two-year-old season including victory in the 1966 STC Golden Slipper Stakes.

Retired in 1967 following an unplaced run in the AJC Doncaster Handicap she was unable to match her deeds on the racetrack as a breeding mare.

== Race record ==
20 starts - 13 wins, 2 seconds, 1 third

== Prize money ==
A£50,243

=== Major wins ===
Storm Queen won the following major races:

- 1966 SAJC Bloodhorse Breeders’ Stakes – (6f)
- 1966 VATC Merson Cooper Stakes – (6f)
- 1966 VRC Sires’ Produce Stakes – (7f)
- 1966 STC Golden Slipper Stakes – (6f)
- 1966 AJC Champagne Stakes – (6f)
- 1966 MVRC Moonee Valley Stakes – (1m)
- 1966 VRC Edward Maniford Stakes – (1m)
- 1966 VATC Caulfield Guineas – (1m)
- 1966 VRC George Adams Handicap – (1m)
- 1967 VRC Lightning Stakes – (5f)
