= Rebel Raider =

Australian Thoroughbred racehorse

Rebel Raider (AUS)
- Sire: Reset
- Grandsire: Zabeel
- Dam: Picholine
- Damsire: Dehere
- Sex: Stallion
- Foaled: 17 August 2005
- Died: 17 October 2019 (aged 14)
- Country: Australia
- Colour: Brown
- Trainer: Leon Macdonald
- Record: 21: 6-2-2
- Earnings: A$1,408,340

Major wins
- Victoria Derby (2008); South Australian Derby (2009); Spring Stakes (2010); Chairman’s Stakes (2009); Sires' Produce Stakes (SAJC) (2008)

Rebel Raider was a notable Australian Thoroughbred race horse.

A son of Reset (AUS) from the mare Picholine (AUS), he was foaled in 2005 and was trained throughout his career by Leon Macdonald.

== Racing record ==
Rebel Raider was the longest priced winner (100/1) in the history of the Victoria Derby and the first winner ridden by a female jockey, Clare Lindop.

However, his long-price in the Derby belied his ability as he also recorded wins in the 2009 South Australian Derby, 2009 Chairman's Stakes and the 2010 Spring Stakes.

Unfortunately, injury curtailed his career and he was retired to stud in 2011.

== Stud record ==
Standing at Wyndholm Park Stud he had moderate success siring stakes winners Pretty Punk (2018 Hobart Cup), Waging War (2017 Chairman's Stakes) and Wasabi Bob (2019 Birthday Cup), all trained by Macdonald.

Rebel Raider died in 2019 aged 14 following a heart attack.
