= Bay of Biscay soil =

Bay of Biscay is a term used in South Australia for a dark clay soil of a highly reactive nature, forming a sticky mass when wet and shrinking during long dry spells, developing deep cracks. Though found elsewhere, it is prevalent in many parts of the Adelaide plain.

It is a particular challenge to all-masonry structures, resulting in fractured foundations and vertical cracks in walls. It is not uncommon to see older buildings with walls braced with railway iron or having long steel rods at ceiling level, holding opposite walls together.

A common type of construction in such areas is brick-veneer — essentially a timber-framed building with non-structural brick outer walls — accepting cracks as a likely, but cosmetic outcome, not affecting the building's performance.

== See also ==
Gilgai
