= Cheltenham Park Racecourse =

Horse racing track in Adelaide, South Australia

Coordinates: 34°52′13″S 138°31′58″E

Grandstand

Finishing line

Bookmakers' ring

Cheltenham Park Racecourse was a horse racing track located in the suburb of Cheltenham in Adelaide, South Australia, between around 1921 and 2009.

== History ==
The Port Adelaide Racing Club began thoroughbred racing at the course and in 1921 the club bought the site on which the course stands for £25,000. Administration of the course was taken over by the South Australian Jockey Club in 1975. The racecourse was also once served by now-demolished Cheltenham Racecourse railway station on the Outer Harbor railway line.

In November 2007, the SAJC sold the racecourse land for A$85 million for a new housing development. It was proposed that the proceeds of the sale be used to help fund the Victoria Park Racecourse redevelopment. However, following the decision to abandon racing at Victoria Park, it was decided to use the money for further development at the Morphettville Racecourse.

On Saturday 21 February 2009 the last race meeting was held at the course before its official closure following the sale, and the area was redeveloped as part of the new suburb of St Clair.

== Location and description ==
Cheltenham Park Racecourse was situated north-west of the centre of the city and approximately 5 km (3.1 mi) from Port Adelaide. The track was 2,052 m (6,732 ft) in circumference, with a 325 m (1,066 ft) straight.

== Races ==
The champion horse Tulloch became the first Australian horse to pass the £100,000 stakes mark when he won the S.J.Pullman Stakes at the track in April 1961.

The Queen's Cup, a race held in different locations around the country since 1927 (originally the King's Cup), was held at Cheltenham for the first time in 1990 (incorrectly described as "a new race in Adelaide called the Queen's Cup" by The Canberra Times), and was subsequently held there in some years before its closure.
