= Set Weights =

Set Weights (SW) is a condition for a Thoroughbred horse race. Horses carry a weight based on their age and sex. In a mixed-sex race, fillies and mares will usually carry less than colts, geldings and horses. Additional weight, or penalties, can also apply as a condition of the race. Many of the top races, particularly age-restricted races, are set weights races.

== See also ==
- Weight for Age
