= Victoria Park, Adelaide =

Park in Adelaide, South Australia

Victoria Park
- Pakapakanthi
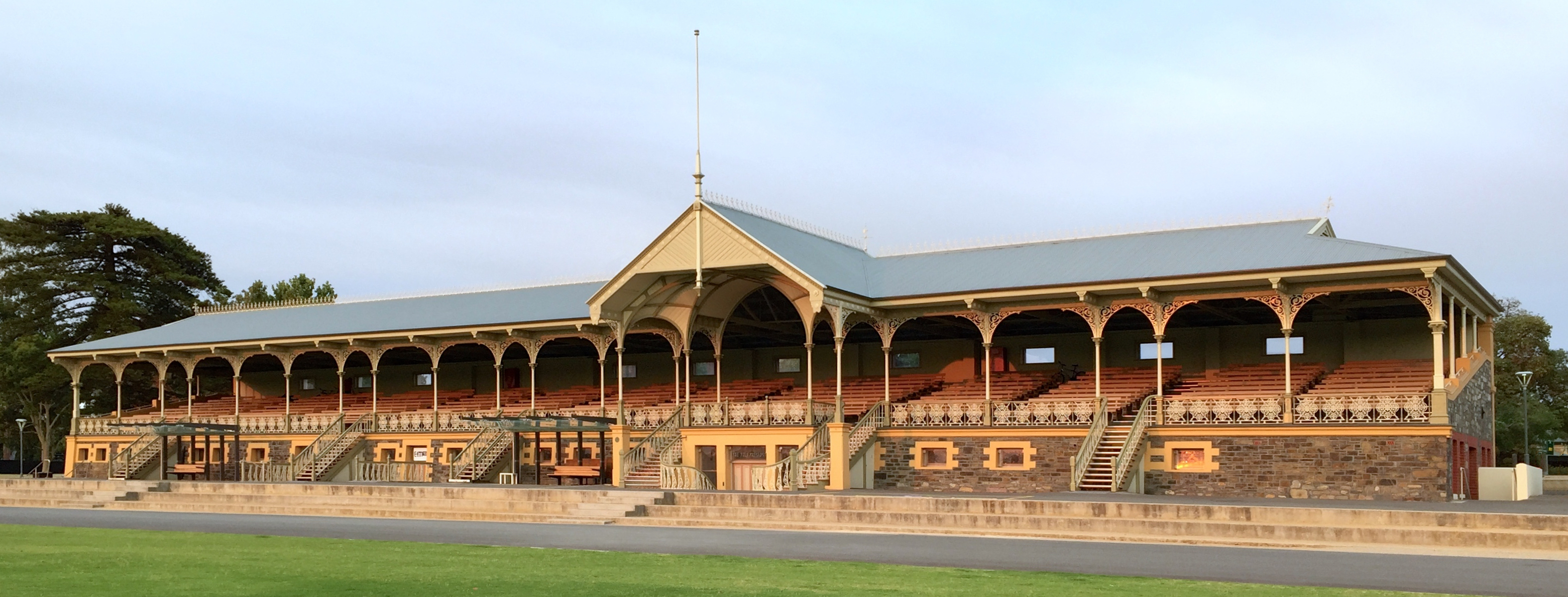
- The Victoria Park Grandstand in 2019

- Location within City of Adelaide
- Type: Urban park
- Location: Adelaide, South Australia, Australia
- Coordinates: 34.933°S 138.621°E
- Area: 72 ha (180 acres)
- Designer: William Light
- Etymology: Queen Victoria
- Operator: City of Adelaide
- Website: www.adelaide-parklands.asn.au/park-16

Victoria Park / Pakapakanthi, also known as Park 16, is a park located in the Southeastern Park Lands of the South Australian capital of Adelaide. It is bordered by Fullarton Road, Greenhill Road, East Terrace and Wakefield Road. Before 1897 it was known as the Old Adelaide Racecourse.

It has hosted several major events in recent years, the most prominent of which were the Formula 1 from 1985 to 1995, and from 1999 the Adelaide 500. This race was cancelled in 2020 for the 2021 season during the COVID pandemic, but returned in December 2022. Victoria Park is also the host of three Pedal Prix races through the year, run by the AHPVSS (Australian Human Powered Vehicle Super Series).

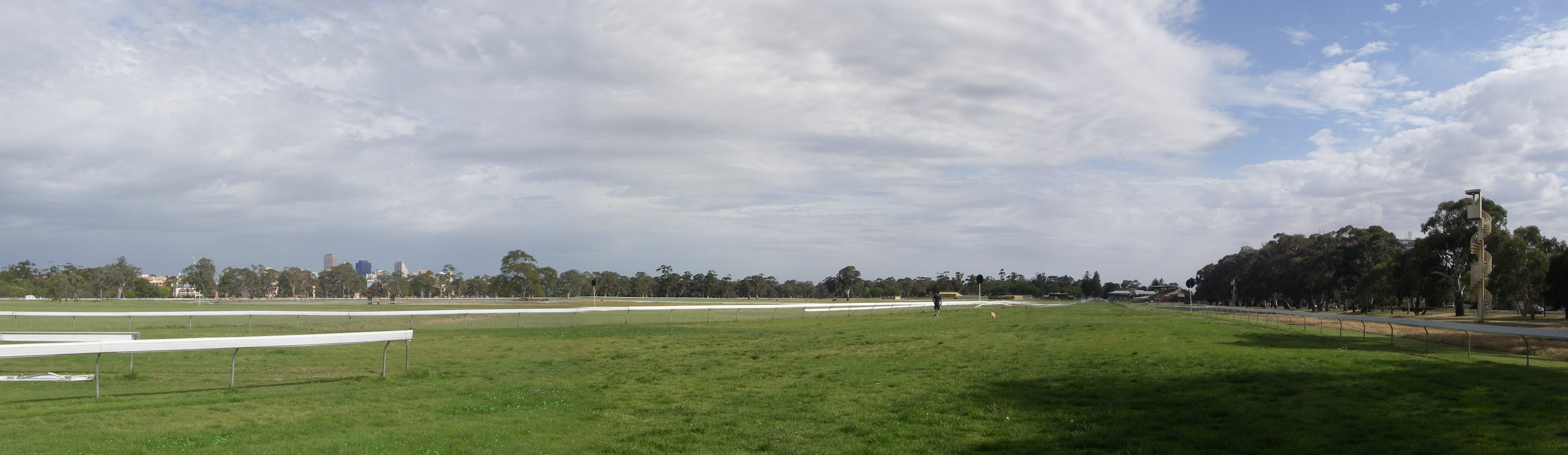
Horse racing track along the eastern edge of Victoria Park, adjacent Fullarton Road

The park's most prominent feature was the Victoria Park Racecourse, the home course of the Adelaide Racing Club prior to its amalgamation with the South Australian Jockey Club; the main track was 2,360 metres long, with the longest home-straight of any horse racing track in Australia.

== Early history ==
In the early days of Adelaide, races were held in this area, the East Park Lands, opposite the Britannia Hotel, (eponym of the Britannia Roundabout), the course redefined from time to time. These were no doubt very fine horses, but gentlemen's hacks not thoroughbreds, (Note: W. S. Whitington imported the first thoroughbred horse, Actæon, into South Australia in 1840. The Gleeson brothers, with Abdallah, were not far behind.) and ridden by their owners, not professional jockeys.

A Turf Club was formed in August 1838, conducting two-day meetings in January 1839 and January 1840, then folded. It was re-formed in 1848, adopting Newmarket Rules to obviate the kind of disputes which sank its predecessor, and vice-regal patronage to ensure access to the racecourse. In the ensuing years, racing activity centred on "private matches" between horses, such as that between Mercury and Coronet, often attracting great public interest and consequent wagers. Three-day "summer meetings" were held in January 1850 on a new track in November 1850, November 1851, December 1852, and December 1853. Similar "autumn meetings" were held in May 1854 and April 1855

The South Australian Jockey Club was formed in January 1856, and conducted the autumn meetings in April 1856, April 1857, April 1858, April 1859, April 1860, April 1861, and April 1862

=== Competition from Thebarton ===
Adelaide's first racecourses
1 Adelaide racecourse
2 Thebarton racecourse

The Adelaide suburb of Thebarton was a popular area for equestrian events, and numerous hurdle and other races were held there in the 1850s and earlier, in the streets and through properties of sympathetic landowners. A course was laid out on land held by E. M. Bagot and Gabriel Bennett of Bagot & Bennett, stock agents — Section 48, bounded by the thoroughfares now known as Henley Beach Road, South Road, Darebin Street and Bagot Avenue. Non-club meetings were held in January 1859, January 1860, and April 1861.

The Jockey Club re-formed in 1861, and adopted the Thebarton track, dubbed the "Butchers' course" or "South Road course" and, determined to control all horse racing in the State, recovered their grandstand from the Adelaide Course. They held their first summer meeting there on 1–2 January 1862, and in April 1863 the first three-day SAJC autumn races. Other events were the 1863 St Patrick's Day races and the Grand Annual Steeplechase in September 1866. A pony race which was to have been held at the Adelaide course was transferred to Thebarton, the organisers blaming condition of the track for the decision. The first six Adelaide Cups (1864–1869) were held there.

The race-going public, at first enthusiastic, became disillusioned with the new course — it was hot and dusty, and not so conveniently situated to North Adelaide and the eastern suburbs, so many pleasure-seekers found alternative distractions. The Jockey Club collapsed under weight of its debts and the lease was terminated in 1869.

=== Becomes "Old Adelaide Course" ===
Racing continued at the East Park Lands despite pressure from Thebarton. In 1864 P. B. Coglin took a 14-year lease on the Adelaide course. In December 1865 the Old Adelaide Course Racing Club (later Adelaide Racing Club) was formed by a breakaway group from the SAJC, sparking a rivalry, at times bordering on vitriolic antagonism, that lasted a hundred years.

The 1869 autumn races were held at the East Park Lands, now dubbed the "Old Adelaide Course"

The 1870 New Year's races were organised by Gabriel Bennett, who revived regular race meetings there in May 1871.

=== Competition from Morphettville ===
Some races had been conducted in the Glenelg region in the 1850s, at the rear of John Bernie's Morphett Arms Hotel.

After five or six years of existence in name only, the SAJC re-formed in 1873, and acquired its own ground at Morphettville (dubbed the "Elder Course" for their benefactor, Thomas Elder, or "Bay of Biscay course" for its unstable soil) and held their first meeting there on 3 January 1876.

The April 1878 three-day autumn meeting was held at the Elder Course, Morphettville, and the Adelaide Cup of 1879 was held there on the Tuesday after Easter.

=== The "Old Course" revived ===
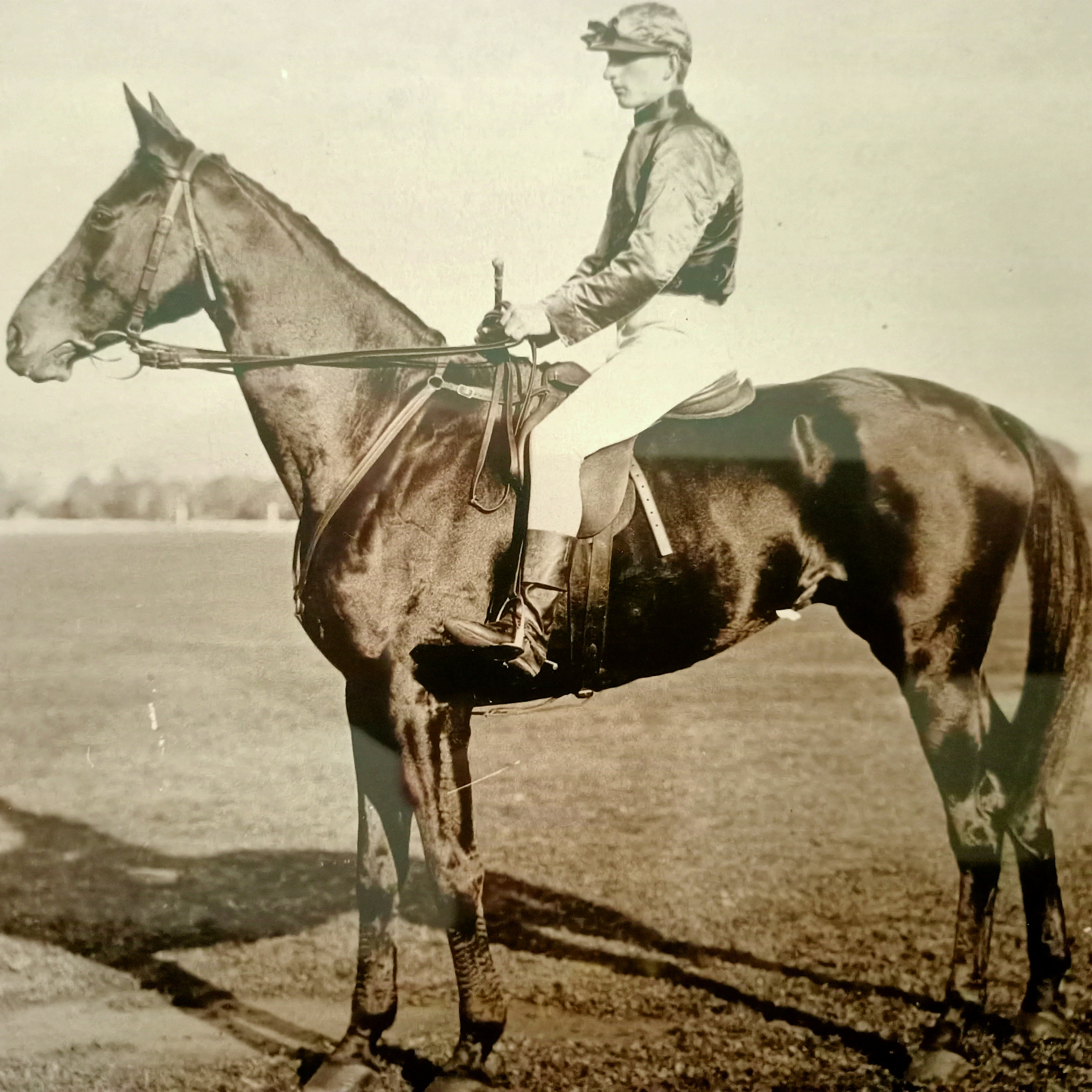
Jack McGowan riding Jack Spratt at Victoria Park in 1896

In 1879 a 21 year lease on the course was awarded by the City Council to Bennett, William Blackler, Seth Ferry and Dr Robert Peel, who launched the Adelaide Racing Club, which was formally founded on 14 October 1879, adopting Victorian Racing Club rules; the committee to consist of the four lessees plus three elected members: George Church, Henry Hughes, and W. F. Stock.

In late 1879 the law prohibiting totalizators on South Australian racecourses was disallowed, and Ferry purchased a £300 "box tote", which he leased to the Club. It proved profitable for the Club when Mata, banned elsewhere, won the 1881 Birthday Cup. (Note: This was one of several occasions when SAJC vindictiveness against the rival club backfired — they had been advised by VJC that Mata, a popular Tasmanian mare, had been banned from racing, but did not pass the information on until her entry had been accepted. Huge crowds watched her win the Cup, and AJC was able to convince VRC they had done nothing wrong and suffered no penalty.)

Led by Ferry and Blackler, the Club spent so much on the ground, prizemoney and infrastructure (far more was spent on the grandstand than was required by the Council's covenant) that within a year two lessees dropped out, leaving just Ferry and Blackler, who brought in his son W. A. Blackler as a third shareholder. Several committee members also dropped out, necessitating fresh elections to restore the quorum. In time however, the lease proved a cash cow for the lessees, for which the City Council was roundly criticised by the Adelaide press. His good fortune did not last, as in 1883 Parliament passed the Totalizator Repeal Act, making its use illegal and race-going less attractive. Then came the drought of 1884–1886, and a consequent recession, which disproportionately affected the ARC, causing a rift between Ferry, who was prepared to wait for better times, and Blackler, who was keen to surrender the lease. The Council wanted to extend Halifax Street through to Fullarton Road, cutting the course in two, and would have compensated them financially. Ferry had his way, and for a few years persevered with low-key meetings with modest prize money and consequently small fields, dominated by Ferry's own stable.

Iconic races such as the Grand National Hurdle and the Adelaide Grand National were run on the track and won by South Australia's leading cross-country jockey Jack McGowan of Brooklyn Park in the late 1800s.

The "Old Course" was renamed "Victoria Park" by mayor Tucker on 4 August 1897.

== 1935 racebook ==
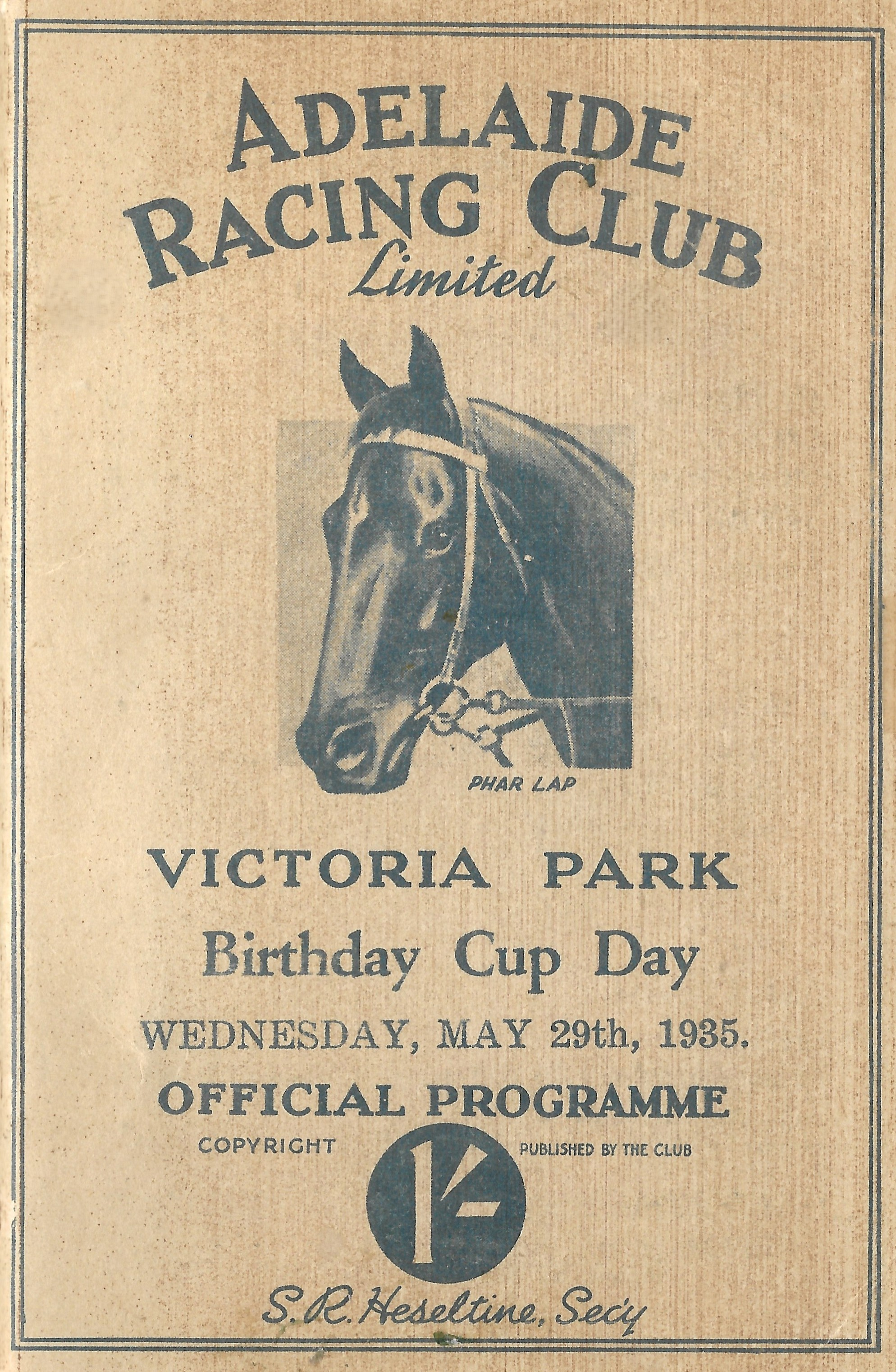
1935 ARC Birthday Cup racebook front cover

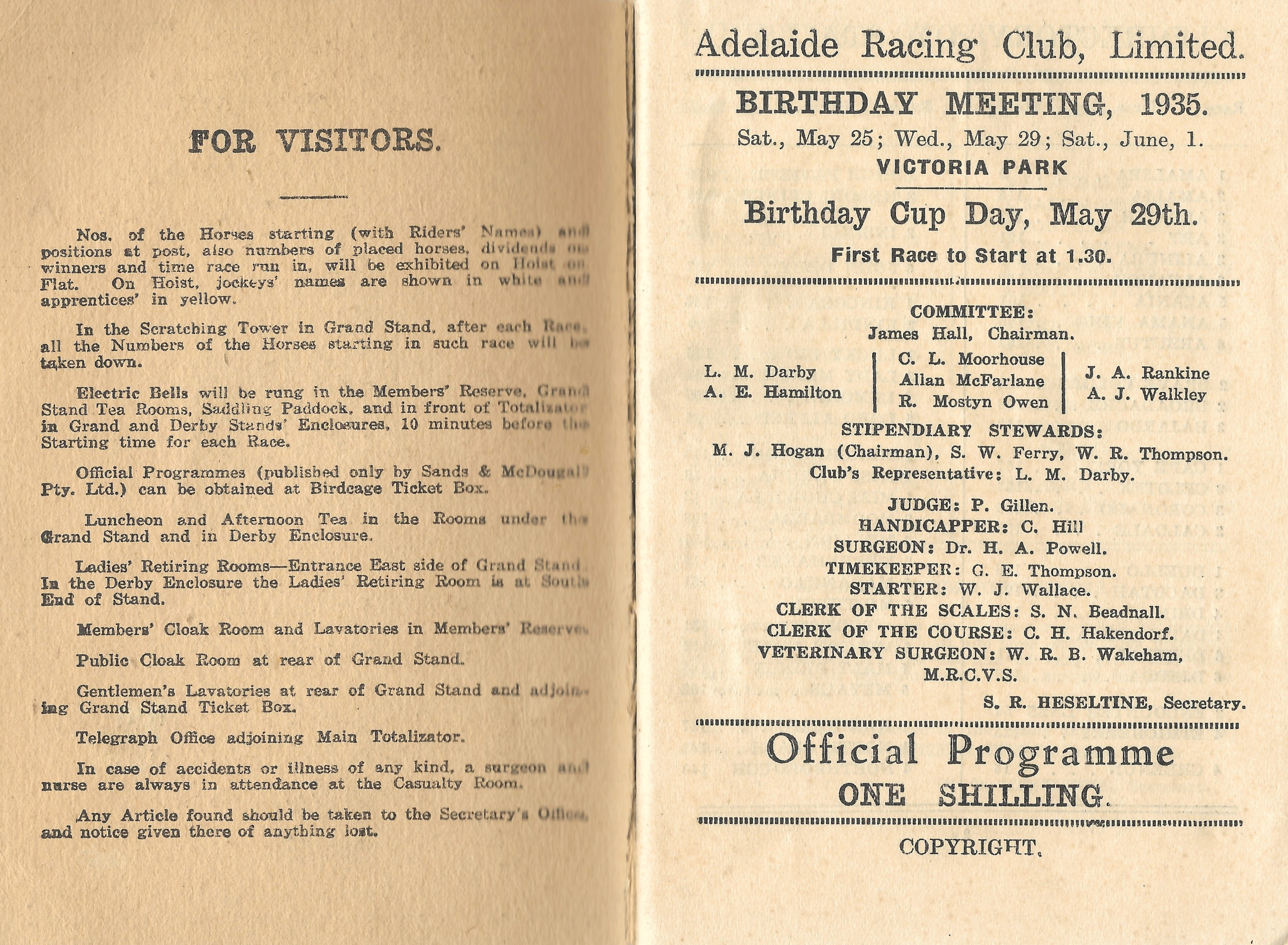
1935 ARC Birthday Cup showing raceday officials

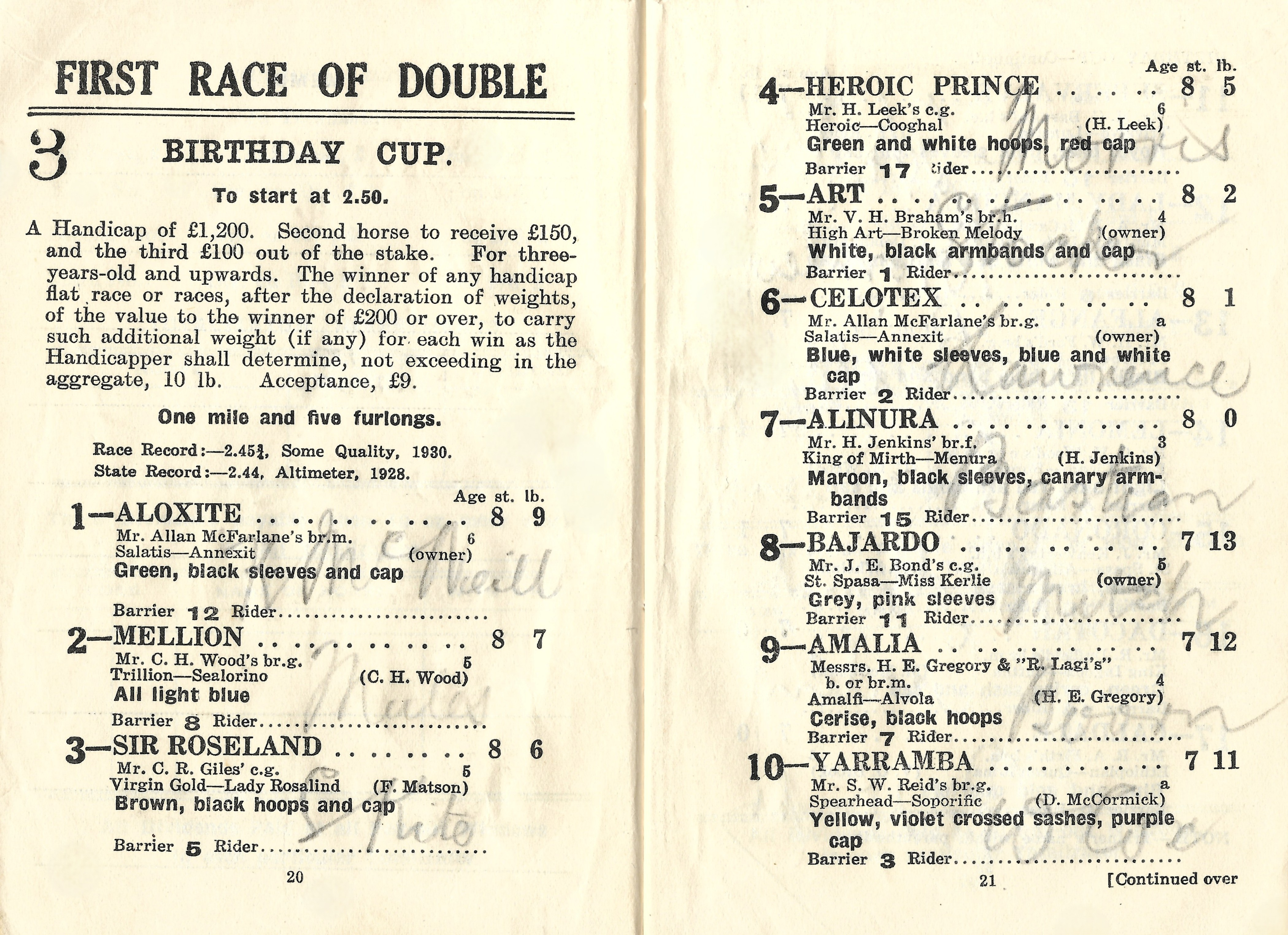
1935 ARC Birthday Cup starters and results

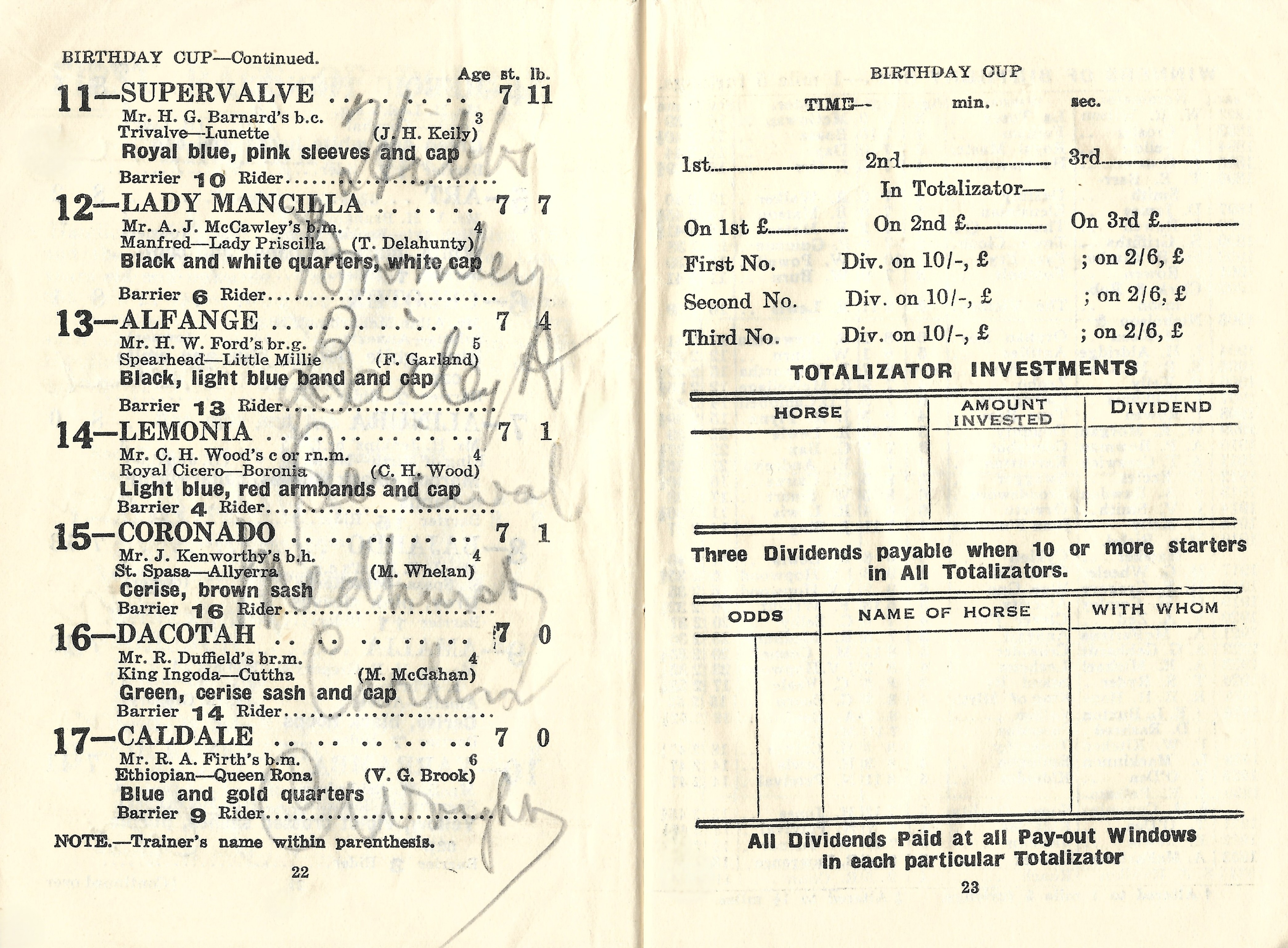
1935 ARC Birthday Cup showing the winner, Coronado

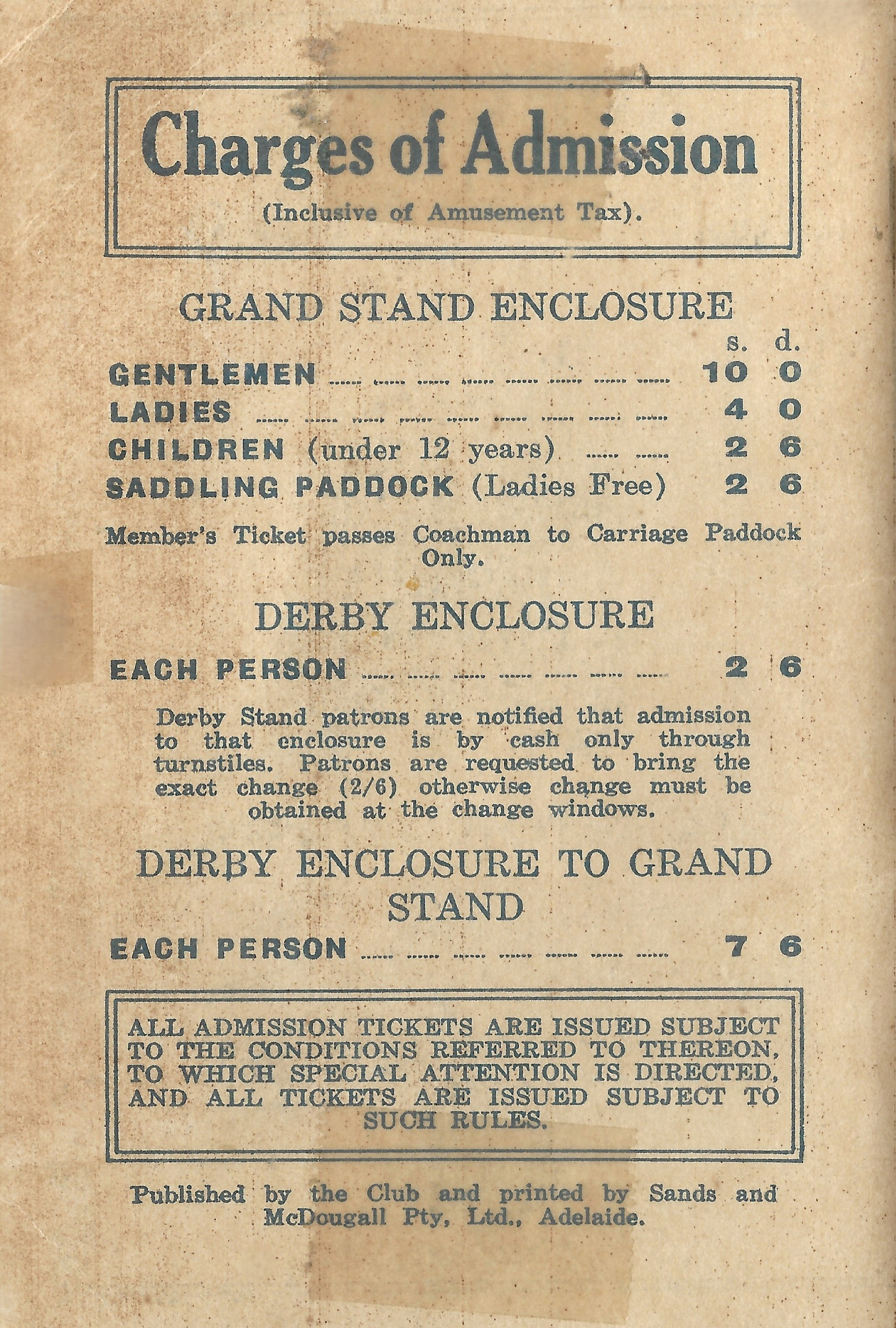
1935 ARC Birthday Cup showing charges of admission

== Twenty-first century ==
Following the rejection of a proposal to upgrade horse and motor racing facilities in early 2008, the SAJC vacated the premises, moving their home course to Morphettville Racecourse. The 1950s-era SAJC grandstand was demolished, as was a large brick wall adjacent Fullarton Road and other utility buildings. The heritage-listed 1880s-era grandstand was refurbished as part of a $16 million upgrade of the park's facilities. The park remains one of the venues for the Adelaide International Horse Trials.

In August 2008, the Adelaide City Council announced plans to turn Victoria Park into a "people's park", incorporating wetlands, community sporting facilities, walking tracks and temporary motor racing facilities.

Part of the Adelaide Street Circuit was built in the northern portion of the park. Temporary grandstands and other facilities were erected whenever motor racing events were hosted there. The Australian Grand Prix took place from 1985 to 1995, and a one-off Le Mans series event, the Race of a Thousand Years on 31 December 2000.

The circuit hosted the Adelaide 500 from 1999 until 2020; its cancellation for 2021 was announced due to the COVID-19 pandemic in Australia, and declining attendance. In 2020, the government established a COVID-19 testing site inside the park. The Adelaide 500 returned as the final round of the 2022 series.

On 19 February 2026 the Premier of South Australia announced that an annual motorcycling carnival, the MotoGP, would take place in Adelaide's eastern Park Lands from late 2027. The Premier admitted publicly that "about 45" trees would be destroyed, and that the century-old Glover East Playspace would need to be "moved", but analysis indicates this significantly under-states the likely impact. The proposed circuit map abuts against remnant grassland in Pakapakanthi that is the habitat of a vulnerable colony of the Chequered Copper Butterfly, which is assessed as likely to not survive construction of grandstands or the presence of people during MotoGP events. A letter has been sent to the president of Federation Internationale Motocyclisme (FIM), MotoGP's governing body, claiming the project breaches FIM's own code of environmental practice. It has been reported that the MotoGP circuit could require as many as 400 trees to be cut down, and that enough signed petitions have been gathered to trigger a formal parliamentary inquiry into the circuit. The South Australian government released the design for the MotoGP street circuit on 30 August 2026. The announcement stated that circuit redesign would see 43 significant trees felled, along with a further 335 of that the government has classified as "regulated, unregulated, invasive, deal, or poor health", another 88 trees would be relocated, and another 22 "under investigation". Public consultation on the track started on Monday (31 August 2026) and would run for three weeks but the premier stated that the government was "genuinely interested in the feedback it would receive". Conservation Council SA CEO had a mixed reaction to the announcement, praising the $15 million investment in "Adelaide Park Lands Nature Positive Package", but lamenting the track going ahead in the city's parklands, as the Conservation Council had sought to have the track moved instead to a ready-made park in Tailem Bend, and not proceed within the parklands. Before release of the design, the SA government had also not briefed Adelaide City Council, but they were "made aware of aspects of the plan". The Lord Mayor of Adelaide considers the MotoGP is not the most appropriate thing to happen in the parklands, that there is a need to better understand the impacts, and that provision of a racetrack in the centre of a city, in what is essentially parklands, is quite challenging.
