= Hareeba =

Australian-bred Thoroughbred racehorse

- Sire: Al Hareb (USA)
- Grandsire: El Gran Senor (USA)
- Dam: Headford Lass (GB)
- Damsire: Red Alert
- Sex: Gelding
- Foaled: 1990
- Country: Australia
- Colour: Bay
- Breeder: Tasman Breeding Venture No 1
- Trainer: Ken Newman
- Record: 26: 10-6-0
- Earnings: A$893,480

Major wins
- Group One; Southcorp Stakes (1994); Australia Made Stakes (1995); George Ryder Stakes (1995) (Later disqualified); Group Two; QTC Cup (1996); Stanley Wootton Stakes (1995); Group Three; Bobby Lewis Quality (1994); Sir Rupert Steele Stakes (1994)

Honours
- Hareeba Stakes (at Mornington)
- Last updated on 31 August 2011

Hareeba (1990–1997) was an Australian Thoroughbred racehorse who won six Black Type races including two Group One (G1) sprints in the 1990s.

He was a bay gelding sired by Al Hareb (won GB William Hill Futurity Stakes) out of Headford Lass (GB) (Red Alert (IRE)-Deep Company (GB)).

== Racing career ==
Hareeba had three starts as a two-year-old without success but returned at three, and, after two further defeats, broke his maiden at Yarra Glen on 28 October 1993. This was followed with wins at Ballarat, Moonee Valley, and Flemington. In his two city wins, he broke the course record for 1,200 metres in winning by nine lengths at Moonee Valley, and defeated the following year's Caulfield Cup winner, Paris Lane, by three lengths at Flemington. After a brief let-up, Hareeba was tried in Black Type company for the first time and finished a close second to Lady Jakeo in the 1994 Australia Made Stakes. While defeated, he had finished in front of the multiple Group One winners Primacy and Schillaci, but, in a foretaste of what would be ongoing issues over the next three years, was injured and had to be spelled.

At four, he failed first-up in the Manikato Stakes but won the Bobby Lewis Quality second-up and recorded further wins, later in the spring, in the Sir Rupert Steele Stakes and the Southcorp Stakes. In the new year, he resumed with an 'amazing display of sheer speed and power' in the 1995 Australia Made Stakes, which was run down the straight at Flemington (with Moonee Valley closed for renovations). Starting odds-on, Hareeba raced out to a massive lead on the flat side and won by five and a half lengths. At his next start, he raced below his best when unplaced behind Mahogany in the Lightning Stakes, and carried topweight of 58.5 kilograms when runner-up to All Our Mob in the Newmarket Handicap. Back to his best, he defeated Mahogany and Schillaci in the Stanley Wootton Stakes and again in the George Ryder Stakes (from which he was later disqualified). Hareeba was then injured and was off the scene for almost 12 months.

When he resumed in the 1996 Stanley Wootten Stakes, he started favourite but finished last of six behind All Our Mob. Following another let-up, he finished second to Mamzelle Pedrille in a Flying on the Gold Coast and scored a course record-breaking win in the QTC Cup, under topweight of 60 kilograms. Seemingly with the Stradbroke Handicap at his mercy, as he was dropping to 57 kilograms, Hareeba continued his 'enigmatic' ways and was unplaced. He returned at six for a final campaign, and was unplaced in the 1997 Rubiton Stakes before breaking down completely in trackwork. Connections tried to save him and wrapped his injured leg in bandages, but, ultimately, he had to be euthanased.
