= Rubiton =

Australian-bred Thoroughbred racehorse

- Sire: Century
- Grandsire: Better Boy
- Dam: Ruby
- Damsire: Seventh Hussar
- Sex: Stallion
- Foaled: 1983
- Country: Australia
- Colour: Brown
- Breeder: Ray Orloff (Oamaru Stud)
- Owner: David, Rod and Mark Baylis
- Trainer: Pat Barns
- Record: 16: 10-1-4
- Earnings: A$1,360,330

Major wins
- W S Cox Plate (1987); Futurity Stakes (1987); Underwood Stakes (1987); Mackinnon Stakes (1987)

Honours
- Rubiton Stakes
- Last updated on 10 February 2010

Rubiton (18 October 1983 – 25 November 2005) was a champion Australian Thoroughbred racehorse of the mid-1980s.

He was bred by the Oamaru Stud in Victoria. Rubiton's name was a combination of "Ruby" and "ton", a colloquial term for 100 runs in cricket.

== Racing career ==
Rubiton started off solely as a sprinter winning the 1,400-metre weight for age Futurity Stakes and coming third in the Newmarket Handicap and Oakleigh Plate to sprinters Placid Ark and Special.

In his four-year-old season, he won his first four starts, dominating at weight for age in the Manikato, Memsie, Feehan and Underwood Stakes. He was then defeated by Drought and Fair Sir in the Caulfield Stakes after overexerting himself in trackwork.

Rubiton atoned for the defeat at his next start by winning the 1987 Cox Plate in track record time of 2.02.9, beating (Our) Poetic Prince, Fair Sir and Vo Rogue. He won a week later in the Mackinnon Stakes at Flemington. Having then gone out for a spell, he never returned due to a tendon injury. He was retired to stud with earnings of A$1,360,330.

== Stud career ==
Rubiton is one of only two stallions (the other is the 1926 winner Heroic) to win and sire the winner of Australia's greatest weight-for-age race, the Group 1 MVRC Cox Plate.

Rubiton's progeny include 38 stakeswinners for 102 stakeswins. Besides Fields of Omagh, twice winner of the Cox Plate (2003 & 2006), Rubiton is the sire of:

- Rubitano (Newmarket Handicap).
- Adam (Stradbroke Handicap, George Main Stakes).
- Flavour (Victoria Racing Club Stakes).
- Patezza (Doncaster Handicap).
- Dilly Dally (T J Smith Stakes).
- Monopolize (Hong Kong International Bowl twice).

He is also sire of sprinter Lucky Secret, winner of 14 of 23 race starts, including the:

- 2008 MVRC A J Moir Stakes.
- 2009 Group 2 MRC Schillaci Stakes.
- 2009 MVRC Stanley Wootton Stakes.

Lucky Secret narrowly lost the 2009 Group 1 rated MRC Oakleigh Plate, pipped at the post by Swiss Ace. An A$220,000 yearling, winner of over $950,000 in prizemoney, Lucky Secret was trained at Caulfield by Tony Vasil.

Melbourne Racing Club have long honoured Rubiton with his own race, the Group 3 Rubiton Stakes, run in February.

== Sire line tree ==
- Rubiton
  - Monopolize
  - Flavour
  - Adam
  - Fields of Omagh
  - Patezza
  - Bulleton
    - Mr Spin
  - Lucky Secret

== Pedigree ==
Pedigree of Rubiton
Sire Century (Aus) 1969	Better Boy (Ire); 1951	My Babu (Fr)	Djebel (Fr)
Sire Century (Aus) 1969	Better Boy (Ire); 1951	My Babu (Fr)	Perfume II (GB)
Sire Century (Aus) 1969	Better Boy (Ire); 1951	Better So (GB)	Mieuxce (Fr)
Sire Century (Aus) 1969	Better Boy (Ire); 1951	Better So (GB)	Soga (GB)
Sire Century (Aus) 1969	Royal Suite (Aus); 1960	Rego (Ire)	Nasrullah (Ire)
Sire Century (Aus) 1969	Royal Suite (Aus); 1960	Rego (Ire)	Missy Suntan (GB)
Sire Century (Aus) 1969	Royal Suite (Aus); 1960	Baraganda (Aus)	Baroda (NZ)
Sire Century (Aus) 1969	Royal Suite (Aus); 1960	Baraganda (Aus)	Propaganda (Aus)
Dam Ruby (Aus) 1977	Seventh Hussar (Fr); 1966	Queen's Hussar (GB)	March Past (GB)
Dam Ruby (Aus) 1977	Seventh Hussar (Fr); 1966	Queen's Hussar (GB)	Jojo (GB)
Dam Ruby (Aus) 1977	Seventh Hussar (Fr); 1966	Ann Boleyn (GB)	Tudor Minstrel (Ire)
Dam Ruby (Aus) 1977	Seventh Hussar (Fr); 1966	Ann Boleyn (GB)	Game of Chance (GB)
Dam Ruby (Aus) 1977	Briar's Toddy (Aus); 1971	Todman (Aus)	Star Kingdom (Ire)
Dam Ruby (Aus) 1977	Briar's Toddy (Aus); 1971	Todman (Aus)	Oceana (Ire)
Dam Ruby (Aus) 1977	Briar's Toddy (Aus); 1971	St. Auriga (Aus)	Landau (Ire)
Dam Ruby (Aus) 1977	Briar's Toddy (Aus); 1971	St. Auriga (Aus)	Joeletta (Aus) (Family: 4L)
