= Alinghi (horse) =

Australian-bred Thoroughbred racehorse

- Sire: Encosta De Lago
- Grandsire: Fairy King
- Dam: Oceanfast
- Damsire: Monde Bleu
- Sex: Mare
- Foaled: 29 March 2001
- Died: 24 October 2017 (aged 16)
- Country: Australia
- Colour: Dark Bay/Brown
- Breeder: Piney Ridge Pty Ltd (AUS)
- Owner: Arrowfield Pastoral Pty Ltd, Planette Thoroughbred Trading Pty Ltd, Belford Productions Pty Ltd
- Trainer: Lee Freedman; Robert Frankel
- Record: 18: 11–2–3
- Earnings: A$4,161,740

Major wins
- Blue Diamond Stakes (2004); Edward Manifold Stakes (2004); The Thousand Guineas (2004); Ascot Vale Stakes (2004); Newmarket Handicap (2005); Robert Sangster Stakes (2005); Ballston Spa Handicap (2005)

Awards
- Australian Champion Three Year Old Filly (2005)

Alinghi (20 August 2001 – 23 October 2017) was an Australian Thoroughbred racemare who won four Group One races, including the Newmarket Handicap, and earned A$4,161,740 in total prize money. She was by the leading sire, Encosta De Lago from Oceanfast by Monde Bleu (GB). Oceanfast's racing record was 12 starts for 2 wins, 3 seconds and 3 thirds for $82,760 and Alinghi is her only stakes winner until July 2009.

Alinghi was trained by Lee Freedman. She is one of the few fillies to win the Newmarket Handicap as a three-year-old. The time-honoured Newmarket Handicap is one of the best sprint race in Australia. It is run at Flemington racecourse in the autumn over 1200m and has been won by some of the greatest sprinters to in Australian racing history, such as Placid Ark, Schillaci, Bernborough, Wakeful, and Ajax, and more recently by Takeover Target, Weekend Hussler and Black Caviar.

Some of Alinghi's other Group 1 wins were the AAMI Blue Diamond Stakes which is the second best Juvenile stakes race in Australia, the Ascot Vale which is Victoria's premier three-year-old sprint race, the Thousand Guineas which is run over 1,600 metres and the Robert Sangster Stakes, a 1,200-metre race held in South Australia.

Over Alinghi's short career she beat other Group 1 winners, including Hollow Bullet and, most notably, another three-year-old champion in Fastnet Rock.

Alinghi was never unplaced until her last start in Australia, which was her sixteenth start; she finished fourth in the TJ Smith Stakes at Randwick Racecourse.

Alinghi was later sent to the United States where her race conditioning was taken over by U.S. Racing Hall of Famer trainer, Robert Frankel. Alinghi won her first start in the Grade III Ballston Spa Handicap over 1,700 metres at Saratoga Race Course on 30 August 2005 before finishing eighth in the Grade 1 Shadwell Turf Mile Stakes at Keeneland in Kentucky. Alinghi was retired in late 2005 after suffering a tendon injury at track work in America while being prepared for her next start at Santa Anita Park and was retired to Arrowfield Stud.

Alingi's dam Oceanfast elevated herself to elite status at Easter of 2008 when her Encosta De Lago yearling set a new record of $2.6 million for a filly sold in Australia.

On 23 October 2017, Alinghi died at Arrowfield Stud after suffering complications whilst giving birth.

== Career record in Australia ==
- Career: 16-10-3-2
- Prize money: $3,470,325
- Min-Dist-Win: 900m
- Max-Dist-Win: 1,610m
