= Chautauqua (horse) =

Australian-bred Thoroughbred racehorse

Chautaqua
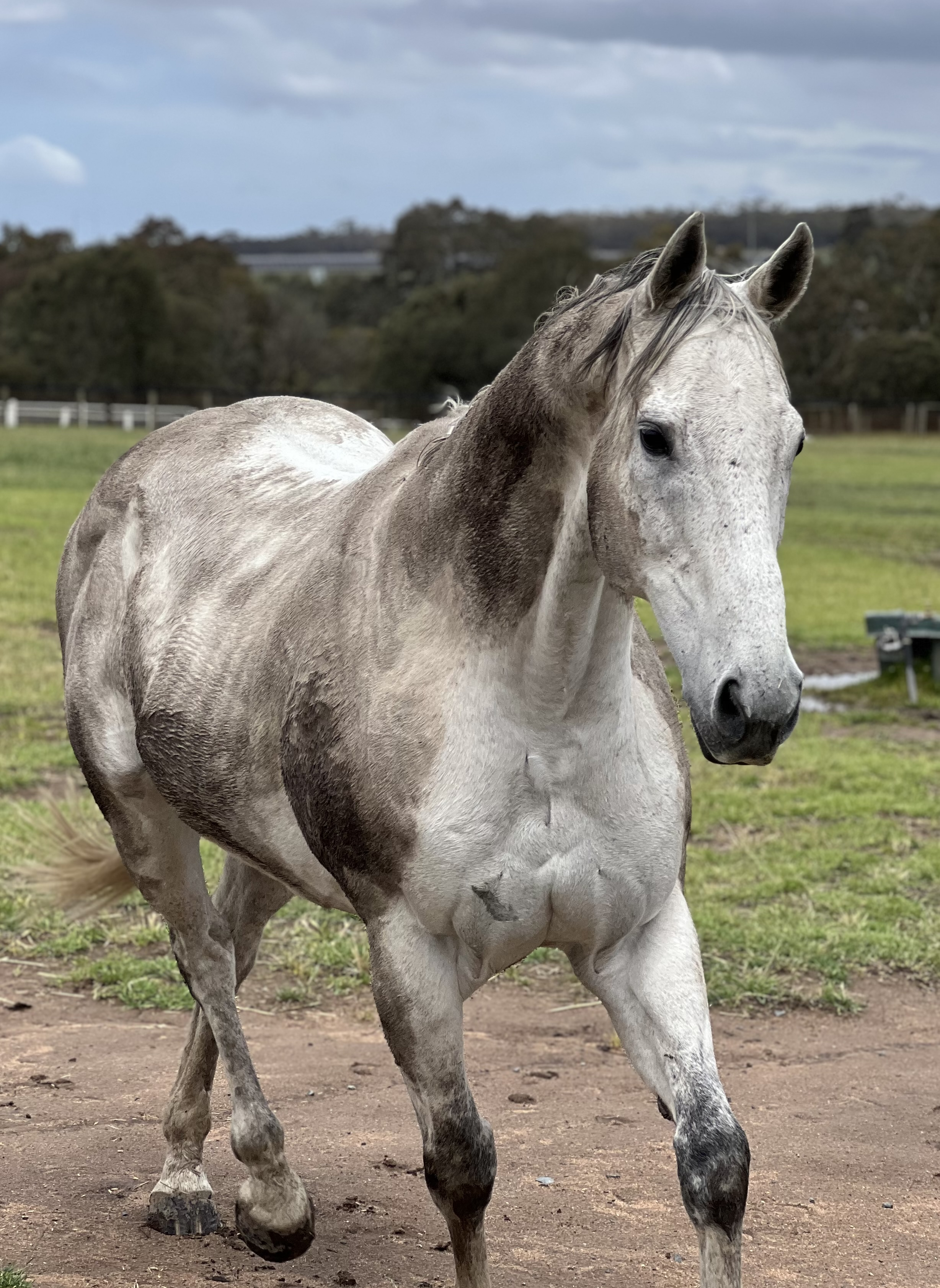
- Breed: Thoroughbred
- Sire: Encosta de Lago
- Grandsire: Fairy King
- Dam: Lovely Jubly
- Damsire: Lion Hunter
- Sex: Gelding
- Foaled: 20 September 2010
- Country: Australia
- Colour: Grey
- Breeder: Fairway Thoroughbreds
- Owner: R & C Legh Racing (Mgrs: R & Mrs C Legh), G P I Racing (Mgr: G Ingham), Gurners Bloodstock (Mgr: M A Ramsden), G Pulitano, S W Kay, Ms M A Keating, Wright Racing (Mgrs: P & R Wright) & Throsby Racing Syndicate (Mgr: Ms E R S Throsby)
- Racing colours: Yellow and purple
- Trainer: Michael, Wayne & John Hawkes
- Record: 32-13:7:4
- Earnings: A$8,821,935

Major wins
- Hawkesbury Guineas (2014); Bobbie Lewis Quality (2014); Gilgai Stakes (2014, 2015); Rubiton Stakes (2015); TJ Smith Stakes (2015, 2016, 2017); McEwen Stakes (2015); Manikato Stakes (2015); Lightning Stakes (2016); Chairman's Sprint Prize (2016)

Awards
- Australian Champion Sprinter (2016)
- Last updated on 30 October 2018

Chautauqua (foaled 20 September 2010) is a former and now retired champion Australian thoroughbred racehorse. Chautauqua's grey colouring saw him receive the nickname “The Grey Flash”. Chautauqua raced 32 times, winning 6 group one races and earning AU$8,821,935 in prize money. This includes three successive Group 1 TJ Smith Stakes wins and a Group 1 Chairman's Sprint Prize (Hong Kong) win.

Chautauqua was co-trained by trainers Michael, Wayne and John Hawkes under their business, Hawkes Racing. The responsibility of the horse relies largely on the trainer. He was ridden by a number of jockeys including James Mcdonald, Dwayne Dunn, Brenton Avdulla but in most Group 1 wins by Tommy Berry. Chautauqua was foaled in 2010 by the famous stallion Encosta De Lago and Dam Lovely Jubely. He was originally put on auction as a foal at the 2012 Inglis Australian Easter Yearling Sale held at the Berkley Park Stud in Scone and was passed in at AU$300,000 after not reaching the reserve of AU$400,000.

Chautauqua's racing colours are purple and yellow. The silk is purple with yellow stripes on the arm and a yellow lightning bolt on the front. It is also worn with a yellow helmet cover.

Famous for his come-from-behind victories, Chautauqua's career ended in controversy when he refused to leave the racing start gates on a multitude of occasions. Such behaviour is very rare in racing and therefore incited debate on animal welfare. This saw him subsequently retire in September 2018.

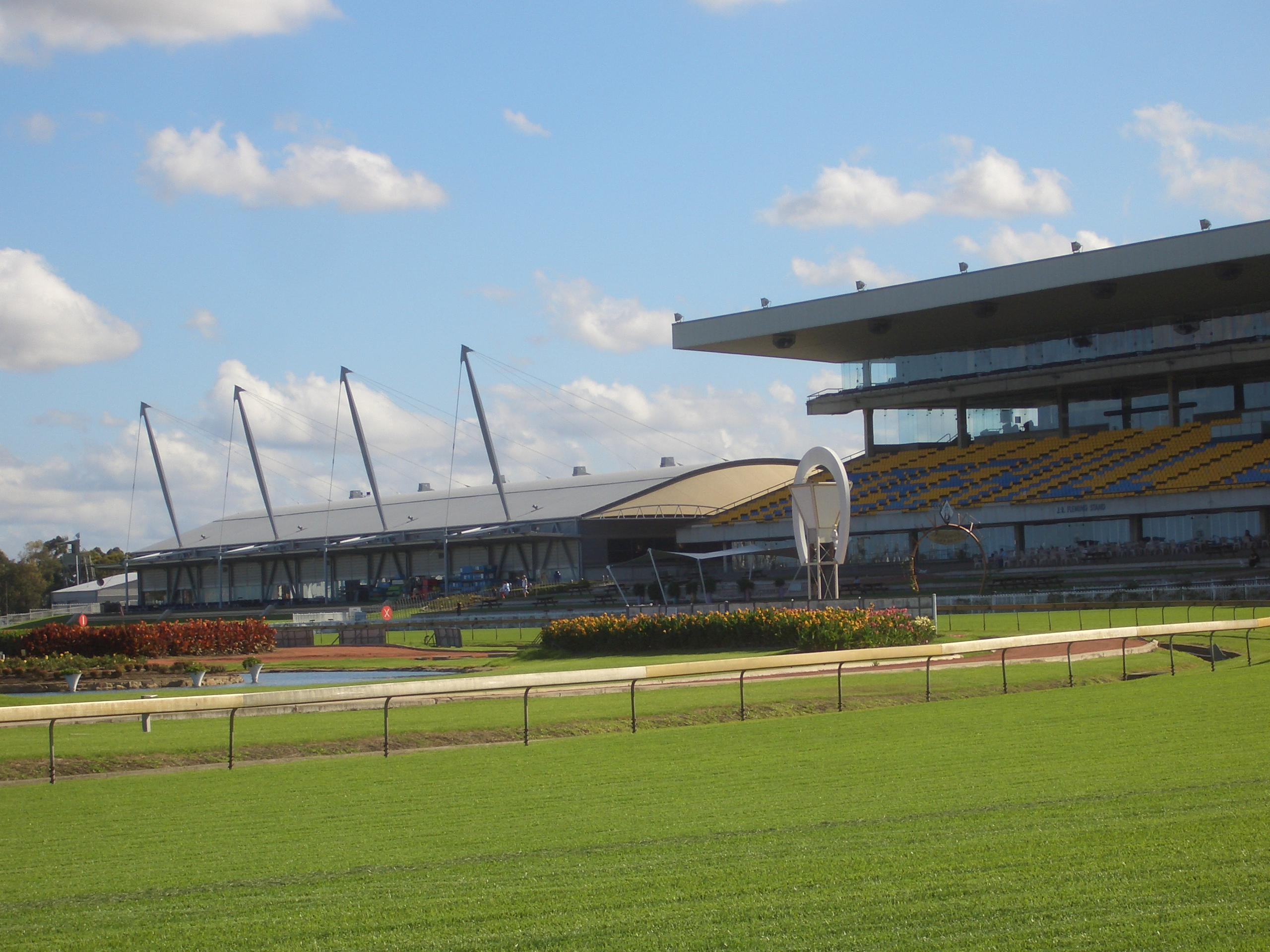
Rosehill Racecourse - Chautauqua's home track

== Racing career ==
=== 2013–2014 season ===
Chautauqua's race career began at the Seymour Race Club in a Maiden Plate race, where he placed 2nd. He then moved to race at Kyneton the following week in another Maiden Plate race, where he again placed 2nd. He was spelled for 18 weeks before achieving his first win at Geelong in a 3-year-old Maiden Plate race. He next raced at Gosford, where he finished 2nd and the following week placed 7th in his first Group 2 Race. Chautauqua's first Group 3 win came the following week at Hawkesbury in the Hawkesbury Guineas. His final race of the season was run at Scone, where he placed 7th and was subsequently spelled for 17 weeks.

=== 2014–2015 season ===
Chautauqua's 4-year-old season started with two wins. Firstly, he won at Flemington in a Group 3 race and then the following week won his first Group 2 race again at Flemington. After a spell of 5 weeks, he again raced at Flemington and placed 2nd in his first Group 1 race. Chautauqua was then spelled for 14 weeks before winning another Group 2 race at Caulfield. He next travelled down to Flemington, where he placed 2nd in a Group 1 race. His next race was his first Group 1 win at the TJ Smith Stakes raced at Randwick earning $1,400,000. Chautauqua's first TJ Smith Stakes was won from last position. He overtook his 9 opponents in the last 400m to narrowly beat Lord of the Sky. He then finished the season in the All Aged Stakes Group 1 race at Randwick, finishing 3rd. Afterward, he was spelled for 20 weeks.

=== 2015–2016 season ===
Chautauqua started the 2015 season with three wins. First he won two Group 2 races at Flemington and Moonee Valley. His third consecutive win of the season came in the William Hill Manikato Stakes, a Group 1 race. This was followed by four Group 1 placings at Flemington, including a win in the Black Caviar Lightning Stakes. This led to Chautauqua's second consecutive TJ Smith Stakes win at Randwick. Chautauqua started his second TJ Smith Stakes as the favourite at $3.60. Again he came from last place, overtaking 14 opponents to claim the Group 1 race. He then flew to Hong Kong to race at the Sha Tin Racecourse in the Group 1 Chairman's Sprint, which he won. Chautauqua allegedly refused to be saddled before his race in Hong Kong. He kicked off a shoe before being restrained and then proceeded to win by coming from behind. After his race in Hong Kong, Chautauqua finished his season and was spelled for 21 weeks.

=== 2016–2017 season ===
Chautauqua's fourth season began when he placed 4th and 7th in Group 1 races at Moonee Valley. After a 16-week spell, he placed 3rd in a Group 2 race at Caulfield. He then placed 2nd in the Canterbury Stakes at Randwick and 3rd in the George Ryder Stakes at Rosehill. He finished the season with his third consecutive TJ Smith Stakes win, edging English in the final straight. Chautauqua did not enter this race as the favourite at $6.50 and trailed the field until the last 250m, overtaking leaders English and Fell Swoop to create racing history. Chautauqua is the first horse to win the TJ Smith Stakes three times and also consecutively. He was then spelled for 21 weeks.

=== 2017–2018 season ===
Chautauqua's final season saw him compete in only four valid races. This included a 6th and 7th place in two Group 2 races at Randwick and then 4th place in the 2017 Everest Cup at Randwick. Chautauqua entered the inaugural Everest Cup in a star-studded field as the second favourite at $5.50. He was boxed in during the final straight and finished 4th. His final valid race of the season was at Flemington in the Darley Classic, where he again placed 4th. Following this, Chautauqua failed to jump from the start box in six successive trials.

=== 2018–2019 season ===
Chautauqua again failed to start in his first trial of the 2018 season. Two weeks later, he started in a trial, placing 2nd, and gave fans hope that his career was not over.

Chautauqua was given a final chance jump in a specially arranged Moonee Valley Friday night trial. This 1000m trial would have solidified his race position in the 2018 Everest Cup. Chautauqua did not jump and was retired officially that night by part-owner Rupert Legh. He was given an applauded parade down the strait of the Moonee Valley Racecourse as a final farewell. Jockey Tommy Berry and co-trainer Michael Hawkes both admitted to being overcome with emotion after confirming the end of Chautauqua's race career. Chautauqua was then commissioned to lead out the 2018 Everest Cup Field as a Randwick farewell. On the following Saturday, he was farewelled at Flemington by being paraded in the mounting yard. Chautauqua's exciting performances were adored by racing fans, evidencing the positive animal and human relationships displayed in sport. Chautauqua's career has helped support one of Australia's much loved sports, racing. Chautauqua has left a legacy with any 'come from behind' victories in racing being compared to the gelding or dubbed as "Chautauqua-like victory".

== Controversy on refusing to jump ==
Chautauqua's refusal to leave the starting barriers was a rare and unseen issue encountered by Racing NSW before. After Chautauqua refused to leave the start box after consecutive races, the welfare of the horse was questioned. Co-trainer Michael Hawkes and owner Robert Legh both admitted to not understanding what was wrong with Chautauqua. Both claimed he was fit and healthy and just did not want to race. Equine doctor, Andrew Mclean believed Chautauqua was not suffering by constantly racing. Mclean believed Chautauqua's behaviour was being caused by a 'freeze response' which was being initiated by a large adrenalin surge as the barriers opened. After Chautauqua refused to jump for the sixth consecutive trial, Racing NSW considered banning him from racing as there was no current rule to govern horses that did not leave the starting barriers. However, Chautauqua was instead retired by owners and trainers on his 7th consecutive incident at the start box in a trial during 2019.

== Statistics ==
Chautauqua retired as Australia's 3rd greatest stakes-earning sprinter behind sprinters Winx and Redzel. Chautauqua earned more than racing great Black Caviar. From his 32 starts, Chautauqua won 13 races and placed in 7. This left him with a win rate of 40.6% and a place rate of 75%. Chautauqua's 4-year career spanned almost 3 years more than the national average for a gelding.

Race type	Wins
Group 1	6
Group 2	4
Group 3	2

== Post-retirement ==
Chautauqua now resides on a property in South Geelong. He is being trained as a show horse. He will be trained by former jockey Casey Bruce and horse racing broadcaster Rob Gaylard. Chautauqua's new daily regime includes trotting and circle work in order to be converted into a hack. Gaylard regards Chautauqua as “highly intelligent” and now goes by the show name "Sharky". Chautauqua has since had a small 15 minute documentary made about his journey after racing and development as a show horse. It was titled Chautauqua - A New Journey and the first instalment aired in April 2020 on Racing.com and Foxtel channel 529.

=== Chautauqua Stakes ===
Starting 4 September 2021 a listed 1200m race at Moonee Valley, previously called the Chandler Macleod Stakes, Strathmore Community Bendigo Bank Stakes and Drummond Golf Stakes, was renamed as the Chautauqua Stakes. The 2026 event, raced at Sandown over 1300m, was upgraded to Group 3.

== Pedigree ==
Chautauqua is considered to have a strong pedigree line, being fathered by famous stallion, Encosta De Lago. Encosta De Lago has fathered many other champion racehorses including Alinghi, Princess Coup, Sacred Kingdom and Sirmione. Lion Hunter (Chautauqua's grandfather) is also considered to carry a strong line, having a world record number of wins from his offspring. Additionally Fairy King has sired horses which have achieved over 395 wins.

Pedigree of Chautauqua
Sire Encosta De Lago (AUS) -1993	Fairy King (USA) - 1982	Northern Dancer (CAN) - 1961	Nearctic (CAN) - 1954
Sire Encosta De Lago (AUS) -1993	Fairy King (USA) - 1982	Northern Dancer (CAN) - 1961	Natalma (USA) - 1957
Sire Encosta De Lago (AUS) -1993	Fairy King (USA) - 1982	Fairy Bridge (USA) - 1975	Bold Reason (USA) - 1968
Sire Encosta De Lago (AUS) -1993	Fairy King (USA) - 1982	Fairy Bridge (USA) - 1975	Special (USA) - 1969
Sire Encosta De Lago (AUS) -1993	Shoal Creek (AUS) - 1988	Star Way (GB) - 1977	Star Appeal (IRE) - 1970
Sire Encosta De Lago (AUS) -1993	Shoal Creek (AUS) - 1988	Star Way (GB) - 1977	New Way (GB) - 1970
Sire Encosta De Lago (AUS) -1993	Shoal Creek (AUS) - 1988	Rolls (USA) - 1984	Mr Prospector (USA) - 1970
Sire Encosta De Lago (AUS) -1993	Shoal Creek (AUS) - 1988	Rolls (USA) - 1984	Grand Lux (CAN) - 1974
Dam Lovely Jubly (AUS) -1999	Lion Hunter (AUS) - 1992	Danehill (USA) - 1986	Danzig (USA) - 1977
Dam Lovely Jubly (AUS) -1999	Lion Hunter (AUS) - 1992	Danehill (USA) - 1986	Razyana (USA) - 1981
Dam Lovely Jubly (AUS) -1999	Lion Hunter (AUS) - 1992	Pure of Heart (IRE) - 1978	Godswalk (USA) - 1974
Dam Lovely Jubly (AUS) -1999	Lion Hunter (AUS) - 1992	Pure of Heart (IRE) - 1978	Audrey Joan (GB) - 1963
Dam Lovely Jubly (AUS) -1999	Jaboulet (NZ) - 1988	Vice Regal (NZ) - 1973	Bismark (GB) - 1967
Dam Lovely Jubly (AUS) -1999	Jaboulet (NZ) - 1988	Vice Regal (NZ) - 1973	Kind Regards (NZ) - 1966
Dam Lovely Jubly (AUS) -1999	Jaboulet (NZ) - 1988	Avadel (NZ) - 1979	In the Purple (FR) - 1966
Dam Lovely Jubly (AUS) -1999	Jaboulet (NZ) - 1988	Avadel (NZ) - 1979	Mordello (NZ) - 1961
