= Shaftesbury Avenue Handicap =

- Class: Group 3
- Location: Flemington Racecourse
- Inaugurated: 2001 (Listed)
- Race type: Thoroughbred
- Sponsor: Kirin Ichiban

Race information
- Distance: 1,400 metres
- Surface: Turf
- Qualification: Maidens ineligible
- Weight: Open handicap
- Purse: $200,000 (2026)

The Shaftesbury Avenue Handicap, is a Victoria Racing Club Group 3 Thoroughbred open handicap horse race, over a distance of 1400 metres held annually at Flemington Racecourse in Melbourne during the VRC Autumn Racing Carnival in March.

== History ==
The registered race is named after Shaftesbury Avenue, who won the 1991 VRC Newmarket Handicap and 1991 Lightning Stakes.

Craig Williams rode the winner of the race in 2006, 2012, 2014, 2015, 2020 and 2024.

=== Name ===
- 2001–2004 - PFD Food Services Stakes
- 2005–2007 - Chubb Stakes
- 2008–2009 - Melbourne Food & Wine Plate
- 2010 - Mrs Mac's Pies Handicap
- 2011 - TAB 50th Birthday Stakes
- 2012 - VIC TAB Guaranteed $2m Quaddie Stakes
- 2013 - TAB Stakes
- 2014–2017 - TAB Rewards Stakes
- 2018 - TAB Multiplier Autumn Handicap
- 2019 onwards - The TAB Shaftesbury Avenue Handicap

=== Grade ===
- 2001–2007 - Listed Race
- 2008–2010 - Open Handicap (unlisted)
- 2011–2013 - Listed Race
- 2014 onwards - Group 3

=== Venue ===
- The race was run at Caulfield Racecourse in 2007 due to reconstruction of the Flemington racetrack.

== Winners ==
The following are past winners of the race.

- 2026 - Scheelite
- 2025 - Is It Me
- 2024 - Von Hauke
- 2023 - Scallopini
- 2022 - Kissonallforcheeks
- 2021 - Morvada
- 2020 - Blazejowski
- 2019 - Violate
- 2018 - Nozomi
- 2017 - He Or She
- 2016 - Red Bomber
- 2015 - Amorino
- 2014 - Mouro
- 2013 - Launay
- 2012 - Rockpecker
- 2011 - Launay
- 2010 - Stillme
- 2009 - Rockpecker
- 2008 - Orange County
- 2007 - Recapitalize
- 2006 - Sojustrememberthis
- 2005 - Youth
- 2004 - Cross Current
- 2003 - Belle Ball
- 2002 - Tears Royal
- 2001 - Sedation

== See also ==
- List of Australian Group races
- Group races
