= Platelet (horse) =

Australian-bred Thoroughbred racehorse

- Sire: Strategic (AUS)
- Grandsire: Zeditive (AUS)
- Dam: Bloodline (AUS)
- Damsire: Dracula (AUS)
- Sex: Mare
- Foaled: 2 November 2008
- Country: Australia
- Colour: Bay (horse)
- Breeder: GH Forbes (NSW)
- Owner: Cressfield Stud - (Former owners: Aus Thoroughbred B/Stock Syn, G Holt, G Forbes, J Macdonald, P Brittain, B Fellows, A Downing, M Goodridge, Mrs W Weir, T Edwards, Inas Racing Synd)
- Racing colours: Fluorescent yellow, navy blue seams
- Trainer: Darren Weir
- Record: 32: 10-9-5
- Earnings: $1,396,250

Major wins
- SAJC Robert Sangster Stakes (2013); SAJC The Goodwood (2013); VRC Gilgai Stakes (2013); MRC Throughbred Club Stakes (2011); MRC John Monash Stakes (2012)
- Last updated on 16 January 2020

Platelet (foaled 2 November 2008) was a notable Australian Thoroughbred race horse. Platelet is a retired multiple Group 1 winning mare who was trained by Ballarat-based trainer Darren Weir who during her racing career won $1,396,250. Her consistency was highlighted winning 10 races and getting second place out of 32 starts in nine other races. The highlight of her career was winning the Group 1 South Australian Robert Sangster – Goodwood sprint double which only the champion Black Caviar has been able to achieve. She was retired on 18 April 2015. Her second foal was the highest priced Exceed And Excel yearling ever sold at $1.8m.

== Breeding ==
Platelet was born on 2 November 2008 from the Dracula mare Bloodlette.

== Racing career ==
=== 2010–11: two-year-old season ===
Platelet was unraced as a 2yo after playing up in the barriers at Swan Hill and being scratched.

=== 2011–12: three-year-old season ===
She returned after regaining her barrier certificate on the first racing day of the racing season (1 August 2011) where she finished 2nd at Echuca. At this stage it was difficult to imagine the subsequent heights she would reach. She won her second start at Geelong and continued to improve finishing her first campaign as the winner of the Group 3 Throughbred Club Stakes at MRC with the record of 6: 2–2–2. Returning in the Autumn she completed a 6 race campaign finishing with a winning trifecta of races culminating in a victory in the Listed John Monash Stakes. Her record at the end of the season was 12: 5–3–3.

=== 2012–13: four-year-old season ===
Returning as a four-year-old on 1 September 2012, Platelet had 3 starts in the Spring without claiming an elusive victory but still claimed a further two placings. She returned in the Autumn to complete her most successful campaign with Victory in both Group 1 Sprint races in Adelaide (the Sangster and The Goodwood) repeating the feat of Black Caviar the year before. Her record now standing at 19: 7–5–5.

=== 2013–14: five-year-old season ===
Platelet returned in the Spring of 2013 winning the Group 2 Gilgai Stakes at Flemington with Michelle Payne on board at her second start of the campaign. This campaign was not without controversy as she was a late scratching from the Group 1 $1m VRC Spring due to a stabling administration error.

Her autumn campaign added another victory and two further second placings in both the Group 1 Robert Sangster Stakes and The Goodwood. Her record at the end of the season stood at 27: 9–8–5.

=== 2014–15: six-year-old season ===
Platelet started her final racing year with a second in the Group 2 Schillaci in October 2014, then went unplaced in her next two Group 1 starts in the Manikato and the Darley Classic after drawing the outside barrier in both events. She returned in the Autumn winning a 955m sprint at Moonee Valley before injuring herself in what would be her final start the Group 3 Irvin Stakes. The ownership led by Darren Dance of ATB Thoroughbreds making the decision to retire her as she had been very good to them. Her career ended with the outstanding record of 32: 10–9–5

== Retirement and breeding ==
Platelet was purchased by Cressfield Stud in 2015 post her racing career. Platelet's first foal was a 2016 Fastnet Rock colt that was sold as a yearling for $80,000 at the Inglis Classic sale. This was followed by a 2018 Exceed and Excel colt which was sold for the Exceed and Excel yearling record price of $1.8m and represented the 2nd highest priced lot in Australia's highest grossing sale.
