= Al Hareb =

American-bred Thoroughbred racehorse

- Sire: El Gran Senor
- Grandsire: Northern Dancer
- Dam: Icing
- Damsire: Prince Tenderfoot
- Sex: Stallion
- Foaled: 27 April 1986
- Country: United States
- Colour: Chestnut
- Breeder: Robert N Clay, Michael J Ryan & Hermitage Farm
- Owner: Hamdan Al Maktoum
- Trainer: Dick Hern; Neil Graham
- Record: 5: 3-0-0

Major wins
- William Hill Futurity (1988)

Al Hareb (27 April 1986 – after 2002) was an American-bred, British-trained Thoroughbred racehorse and sire. He was one of the best staying two-year-olds in Britain in 1988 when he won three of his four races including the Group One William Hill Futurity. He ran poorly on his only start in 1989 and was retired from racing. He had some success as a breeding stallion in Australia.

== Background ==
Al Hareb was a chestnut horse with a white blaze and three white socks bred in Kentucky by Robert N Clay, Michael J Ryan & Hermitage Farm. He was from the first crop of fourteen foals sired by El Gran Senor, an outstanding performer in Europe where his wins included the Dewhurst Stakes, 2000 Guineas and Irish Derby. El Gran Senor was not a prolific stallion but sired several other major winners including Rodrigo de Triano. Al Hareb's dam Icing was a high-class racemare, whose wins included the Fillies' Mile in 1975, and who produced several other winners including Dr Somerville (Prix de Condé, La Coupe). She was a daughter of Cake, whose other descendants have included the Irish 1000 Guineas winner Tarascon.

As a yearling in July 1987, Al Hareb was consigned to the Keeneland sale and was bought for $575,000 by Hamdan Al Maktoum's Shadwell Estates Co Ltd The colt was sent to race in Europe and was sent into training with Dick Hern at West Ilsley in Berkshire. He was ridden in all of his races by Willie Carson.

== Racing career ==
=== 1988: two-year-old season ===
On his racecourse debut, Al Hareb started 4/5 favourite for a thirteen-runner maiden race over seven furlongs at Salisbury Racecourse on 9 July. He took the lead three furlongs out and drew away in the closing stages to win by eight lengths from Shallow Waters. He was then moved up in class to contest the Group Three Lanson Champagne Vintage Stakes at Goodwood Racecourse nineteen days later. Starting the second favourite in a six-runner field he briefly led the field at half way but faded in the closing stages and finished fifth behind the Henry Cecil-trained High Estate. With Hern suffering from ill-health in 1988, his assistant Neil Graham temporarily took over the training licence.

After a break of more than two months, Al Hareb returned in the Hyperion Stakes (for horses with no more than one previous win) over seven furlongs at Ascot Racecourse on 8 October. Starting the 11/10 favourite, he took the lead inside the final furlong and accelerated away from his opponents to win by four lengths from the John Dunlop-trained Kalanski. Two weeks after his win at Ascot, Al Hareb was equipped with blinkers when he moved up to Group One class for the William Hill Futurity over one mile at Doncaster Racecourse and started the 100/30 second favourite behind Polar Run, who had finished second to High Estate in the Solario Stakes. The best fancied of the other six runners were Mon Tresor (winner of the Middle Park Stakes), Zalazl (Washington Singer Stakes, Stardom Stakes) and Child of the Mist (third to Nashwan in a maiden race at Newbury). Carson retrained the colt in the early stages and turned into the straight in fifth place behind Mon Tresor. Polar Run took the lead, but Al Hareb overtook him two furlong from the finish and stayed on well to win by one and a half lengths from Zalazl, with a gap of seven lengths back to the outsider Frequent Flyer in third place.

=== 1989: three-year-old season ===
On his three-year-old debut Al Hareb contested the Craven Stakes (a major trial race for the 2000 Guineas) over the Rowley Mile course at Newmarket Racecourse on 20 April. He was made the 11/4 second favourite but finished tailed-off last of the five runners, twenty-three lengths behind the winner Shaadi.

== Stud record ==
At the end of his racing career, Al Hareb stood as a breeding stallion in Europe for two seasons and was then exported to Australia. His best offspring was the gelding Hareeba, a top-class sprinter whose wins included the Australia Stakes and the Southcorp Stakes. His other progeny included Bearall who won the Radley Stakes in 1993.

== Pedigree ==
Pedigree of Al Hareb, chestnut stallion, 1986
Sire El Gran Senor (USA) 1981	Northern Dancer (CAN); 1961	Nearctic	Nearco
Sire El Gran Senor (USA) 1981	Northern Dancer (CAN); 1961	Nearctic	Lady Angela
Sire El Gran Senor (USA) 1981	Northern Dancer (CAN); 1961	Natalma	Native Dancer
Sire El Gran Senor (USA) 1981	Northern Dancer (CAN); 1961	Natalma	Almahmoud
Sire El Gran Senor (USA) 1981	Sex Appeal (USA); 1970	Buckpasser	Tom Fool
Sire El Gran Senor (USA) 1981	Sex Appeal (USA); 1970	Buckpasser	Busanda
Sire El Gran Senor (USA) 1981	Sex Appeal (USA); 1970	Best In Show	Traffic Judge
Sire El Gran Senor (USA) 1981	Sex Appeal (USA); 1970	Best In Show	Stolen Hour
Dam Icing (IRE) 1973	Prince Tenderfoot (USA); 1967	Blue Prince	Princequillo
Dam Icing (IRE) 1973	Prince Tenderfoot (USA); 1967	Blue Prince	Blue Denim
Dam Icing (IRE) 1973	Prince Tenderfoot (USA); 1967	La Tendresse	Grey Sovereign
Dam Icing (IRE) 1973	Prince Tenderfoot (USA); 1967	La Tendresse	Isetta
Dam Icing (IRE) 1973	Cake (GB); 1967	Never Say Die	Nasrullah
Dam Icing (IRE) 1973	Cake (GB); 1967	Never Say Die	Singing Grass
Dam Icing (IRE) 1973	Cake (GB); 1967	La Marsellaise	Alycidon
Dam Icing (IRE) 1973	Cake (GB); 1967	La Marsellaise	Ballisland (Family:13-e)
