= Gilgai Stakes =

Gilgai Stakes registered as the Baguette Stakes
- Class: Group 2
- Location: Flemington Racecourse, Melbourne, Australia
- Inaugurated: 1984
- Race type: Thoroughbred

Race information
- Distance: 1,200 metres
- Surface: Turf
- Qualification: Three years old and older that are not maidens
- Weight: Set weights with penalties
- Purse: $300,000 (2026)

The Gilgai Stakes, registered as the Baguette Stakes, is a Victoria Racing Club Group 2 Thoroughbred horse race for horses three years old and older, at Set Weights with penalties, over a distance of 1200 metres. It is held annually at Flemington Racecourse, Melbourne, Australia in early October.

== History ==
Originally the race was named after the former VRC chairman Sir Rupert Steele. The registered name of the race, Baguette Stakes, is named after the champion horse Baguette. The current race name is named after Gilgai Farm Stud, a horse breeding farm in Nagambie, Victoria, the birthplace of the champion racehorse Black Caviar.

=== Name ===
- 1984–1998 - Sir Rupert Steele Stakes
- 1999 - Gilgai Farm Stakes
- 2000 onwards - Gilgai Stakes

=== Grade ===
- 1984–1986 - Listed Race
- 1987–2006 - Group 3
- 2007 onwards - Group 2

== Winners ==
The following are past winners of the race.

- 2026 - Skybird
- 2025 - War Machine
- 2024 - Right To Party
- 2023 - Star Patrol
- 2022 - Private Eye
- 2021 - Kementari
- 2020 - Zoutori
- 2019 - Sunlight
- 2018 - I Am Excited
- 2017 - Keen Array
- 2016 - The Quarterback
- 2015 - Chautauqua
- 2014 - Chautauqua
- 2013 - Platelet
- 2012 - Hallowell Belle
- 2011 - Temple Of Boom
- 2010 - Hay List
- 2009 - All Silent
- 2008 - El Cambio
- 2007 - Stanzout
- 2006 - Fast N Famous
- 2005 - Falkirk
- 2004 - Recapitalize
- 2003 - Bomber Bill
- 2002 - Cosmic Strike
- 2001 - Belle Du Jour
- 2000 - Bomber Bill
- 1999 - Black Bean
- 1998 - Rebel
- 1997 - Rock You
- 1996 - Poetic King
- 1995 - Racer's Edge
- 1994 - Hareeba
- 1993 - Simonstad
- 1992 - Storaia
- 1991 - Vain Sovereign
- 1990 - Joanne
- 1989 - Grandiose
- 1988 - Redelva
- 1987 - Placid Ark
- 1986 - Campaign King
- 1985 - Rich Fields Lad
- 1984 - Royal Troubador

== See also ==
- The Bart Cummings
- Danehill Stakes
- Edward Manifold Stakes
- Rose of Kingston Stakes
- Turnbull Stakes
- List of Australian Group races
- Group races
