= Blazer Stakes =

Rose Of Kingston Stakes
- Class: Group 2
- Location: Flemington Racecourse, Melbourne, Australia
- Inaugurated: 1989
- Race type: Thoroughbred
- Sponsor: Cirka (2026)

Race information
- Distance: 1400 metres
- Surface: Turf
- Track: Left-handed
- Qualification: Mares, four years old and older that are not maidens
- Weight: Set weights with penalties
- Purse: A$300,000 (2026)

The Rose Of Kingston Stakes, is a Victoria Racing Club Group 2 Thoroughbred horse race, for mares four years old and older, with set weights with penalties conditions, over a distance of 1400 metres, held annually at Flemington Racecourse in Melbourne, Australia in early October.

== History ==
The registered race is named for the 1981–82 Australian Champion Racehorse of the Year Rose of Kingston.

=== Name ===
- 1989–1993 - Honda Prelude Stakes
- 1994–1997 - The Hardy Bros Prelude
- 1998 - The Blazer Menswear Stakes
- 1999 - The Gillette Stakes
- 2000–2005 - The Jayco Stakes
- 2006 - Melbourne Cup Carnival Preview Stakes
- 2007 - U C I Stakes
- 2008 - Blazer Stakes
- 2009 - Rose Of Kingston Stakes
- 2010–2019 - Blazer Stakes
- 2020 onwards - Rose of Kingston Stakes

=== Distance ===
- 1989–1996 - 1400 metres
- 1997–1999 - 1417 metres
- 2000 - 1412 metres
- 2001–2002 - 1420 metres
- 2003–2009 - 1410 metres
- 2010–2011 - 1400 metres
- 2012–2013 - 1410 metres
- 2014 onwards - 1400 metres

=== Grade ===
- 1990–1996 - Listed Race
- 1997–2004 - Group 3 race
- 2005 onwards - Group 2 race

== Winners ==
The following are past winners of the race.

- 2024 - Stylish
- 2025 - Miraval Rose
- 2024 - Revolutionary Miss
- 2023 - Life Lessons
- 2022 - Excelida
- 2021 - Still A Star
- 2020 - Sierra Sue
- 2019 - Haut Brion Her
- 2018 - Invincibella
- 2017 - Now Or Later
- 2016 - French Emotion
- 2015 - La Passe
- 2014 - Forever Loved
- 2013 - Fire Up Fifi
- 2012 - Mosheen
- 2011 - Lady Lynette
- 2010 - Palacio De Cristal
- 2009 - Cats Whisker
- 2008 - Bellini Rose
- 2007 - Vormista
- 2006 - Divine Madonna
- 2005 - Sky Cuddle
- 2004 - Skewiff
- 2003 - Vocabulary
- 2002 - Hosannah
- 2001 - Tickle My
- 2000 - Ramano's Star
- 1999 - Hula Wonder
- 1998 - Our Dynamic Lady
- 1997 - Will Fly
- 1996 - Chlorophyll
- 1995 - Tolanda
- 1994 - Sedately
- 1993 - Excited Angel
- 1992 - Danjiki
- 1991 - Holiday Lover
- 1990 - Piper's Belle
- 1989 - Lady Jess

== See also ==
- The Bart Cummings
- Danehill Stakes
- Edward Manifold Stakes
- Gilgai Stakes
- Turnbull Stakes
- List of Australian Group races
- Group races
