= Edward Manifold Stakes =

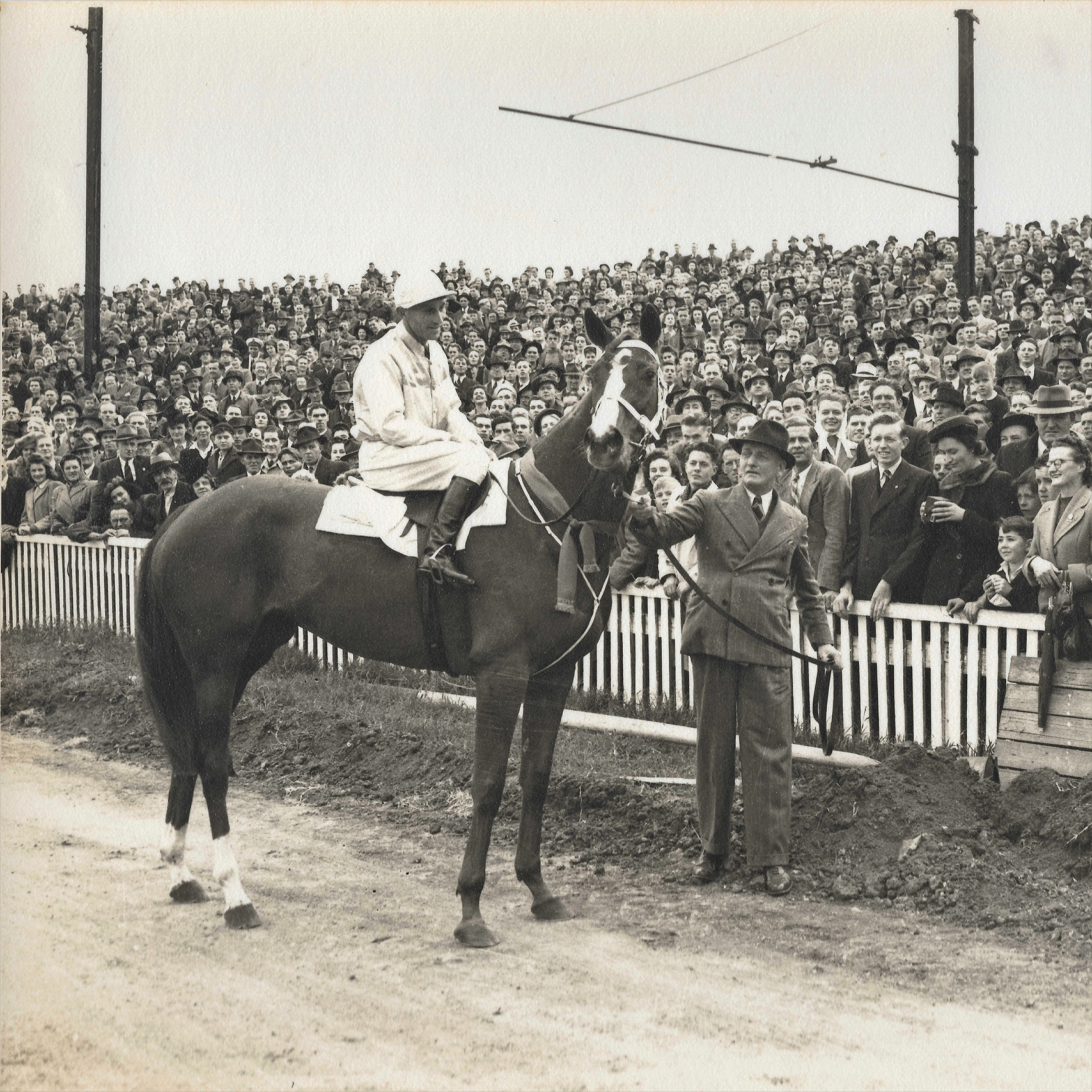
- Tranquil Star, 1940 winner
- Class: Group 2
- Location: Flemington Racecourse
- Inaugurated: 1932
- Race type: Thoroughbred
- Sponsor: TAB (2026)

Race information
- Distance: 1,600 metres
- Surface: Turf
- Qualification: Three year old fillies
- Weight: Set weights – 55½ kg
- Purse: $300,000 (2026)

The Edward Manifold Stakes is a Victoria Racing Club Group 2 Thoroughbred horse race for three year old fillies at set weights run over a distance of 1600 metres at Flemington Racecourse in Melbourne, Australia in early October.

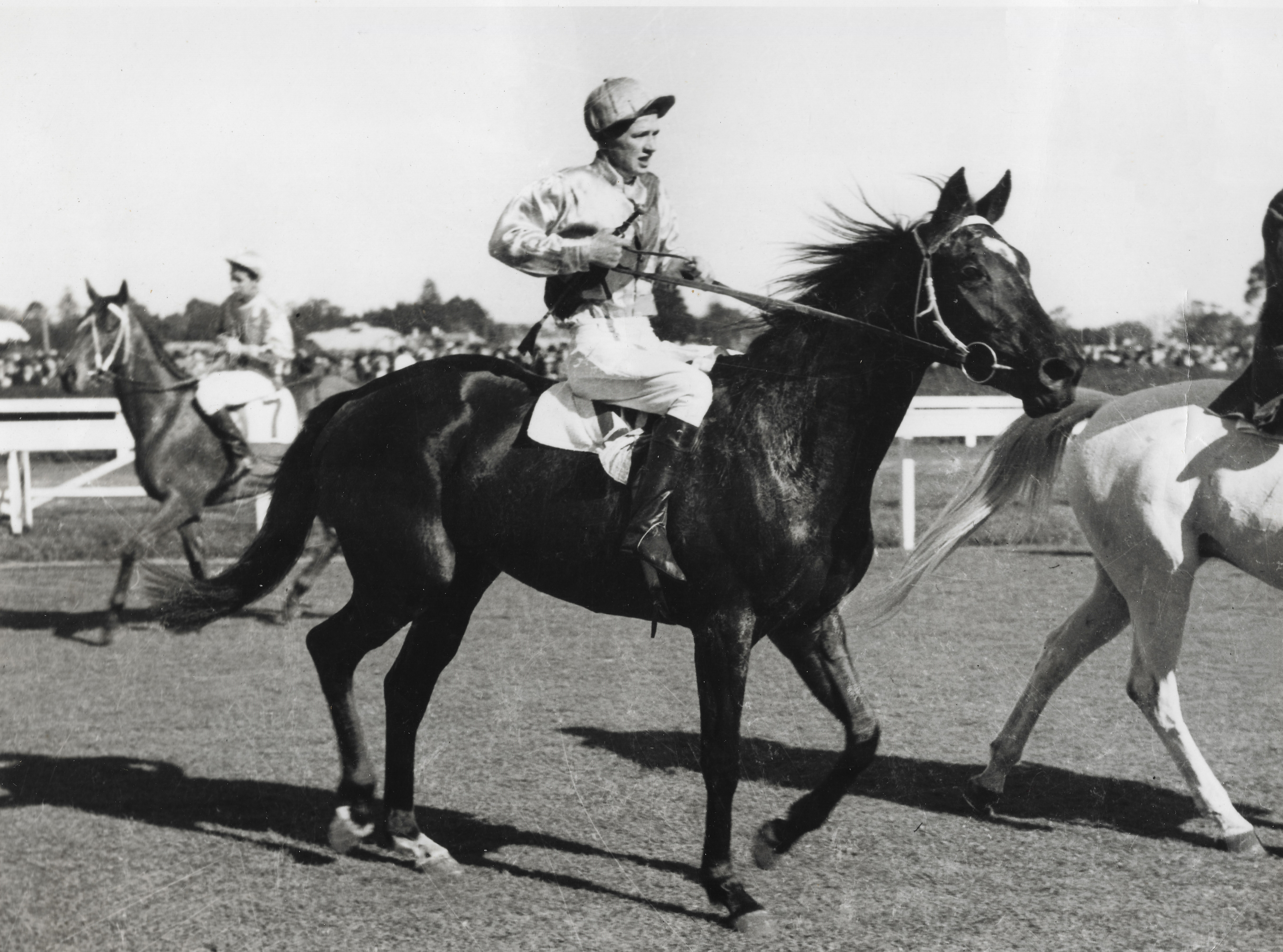
Chicquita, 1949 winner

== History ==
The race is named after Edward Manifold, the long term committeeman of the Victoria Racing Club and member of many Western District racing clubs in the early years of the 20th century.

=== Grade ===
- 1932–1978- Principal race
- 1979 onwards - Group 2

=== Distance ===
- 1932–1978 - 1 mile (~1600 metres)
- 1979–1992, 1994–95, 2010–11 – 1600 metres
- 1993, 1998–99 – 1625 metres
- 1996 – 1626 metres
- 1997 – 1631 metres
- 2000 – 1624 metres
- 2001–03, 2007 – 1620 metres
- 2004–06, 2008–09, 2012–13 – 1610 metres
- 2014 onwards - 1600 metres

=== 1948 racebook ===
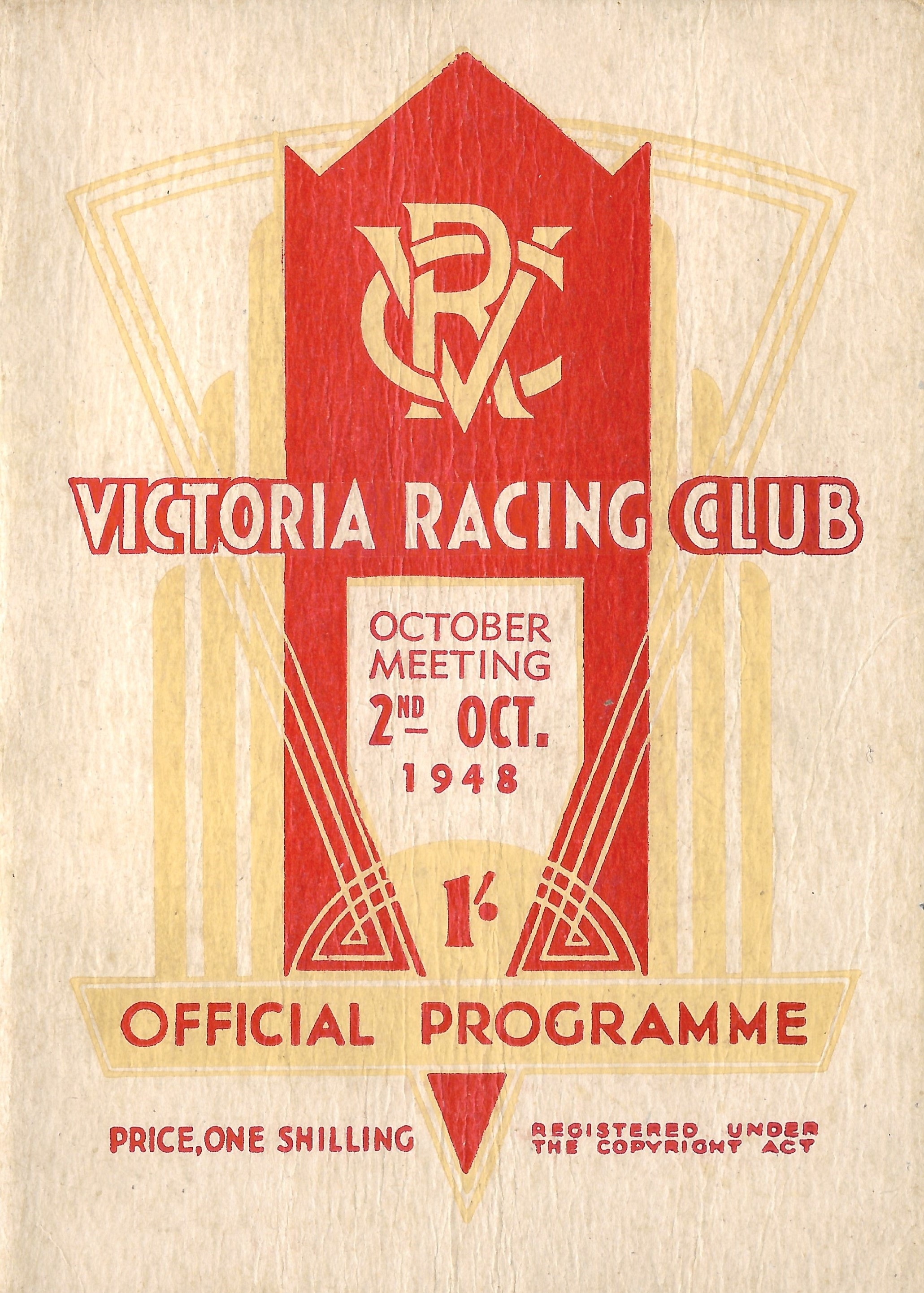
1948 VRC Turnbull Stakes racebook front cover

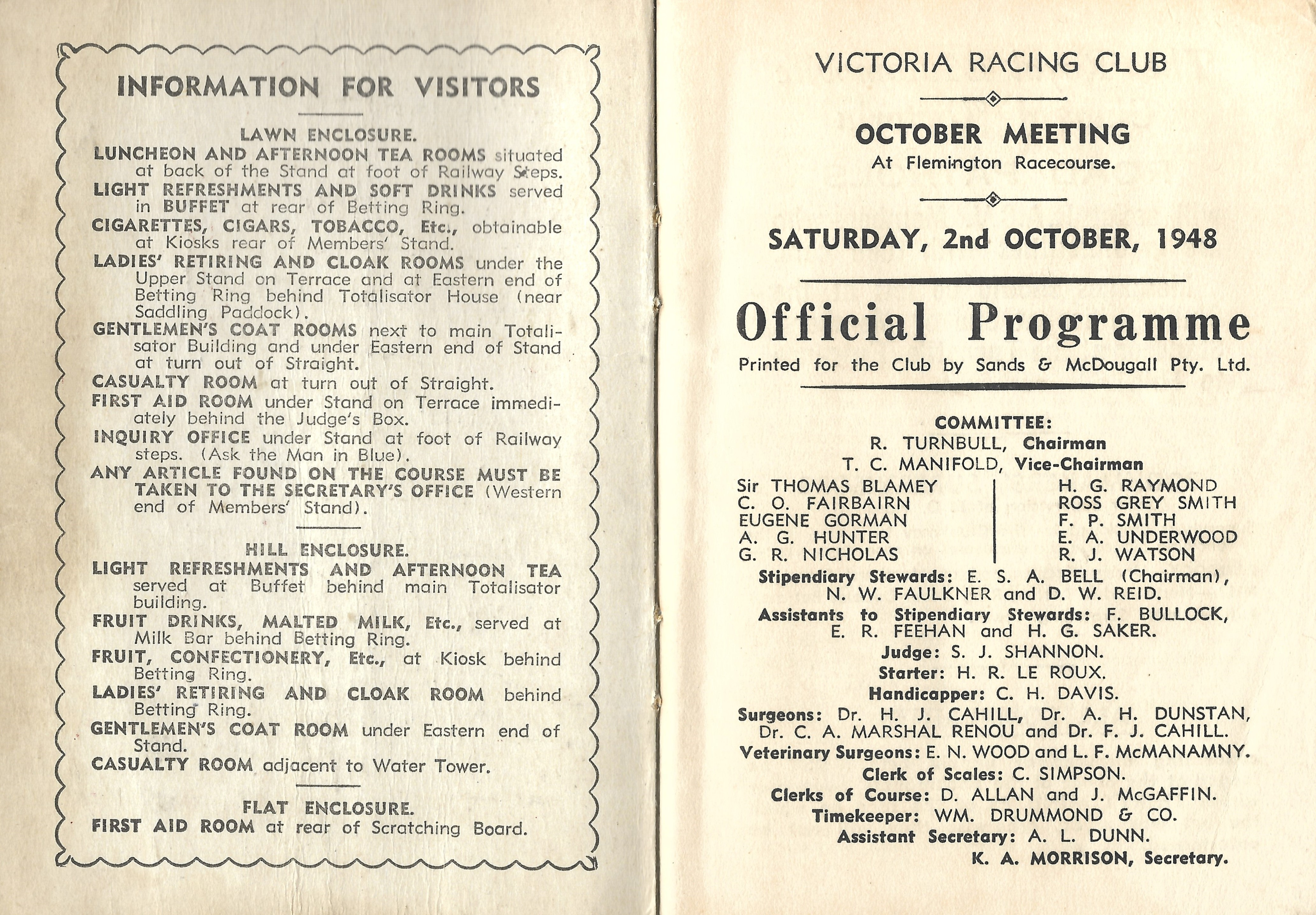
1948 VRC Turnbull Stakes raceday officials

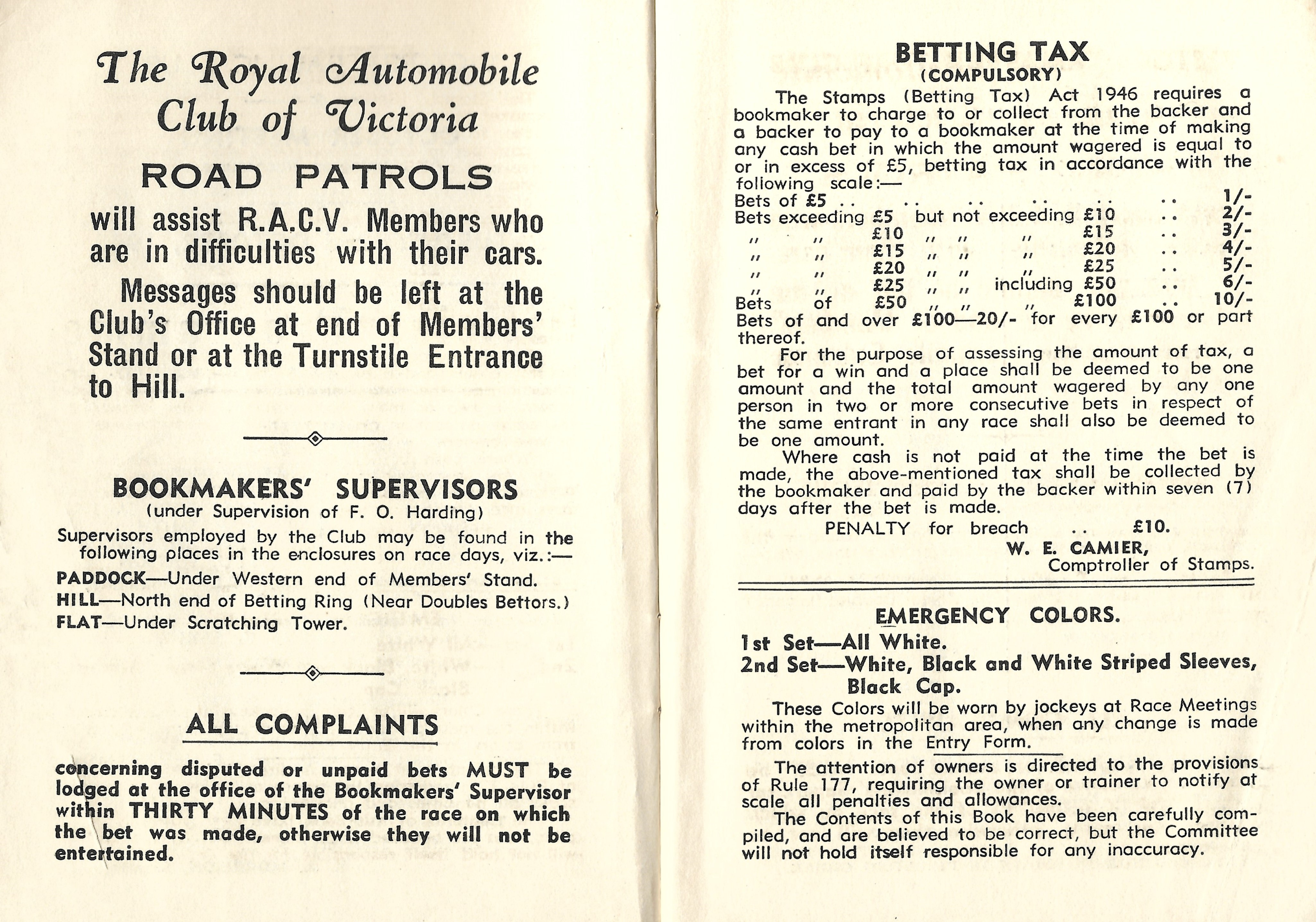
1948 VRC Turnbull Stakes raceday notices

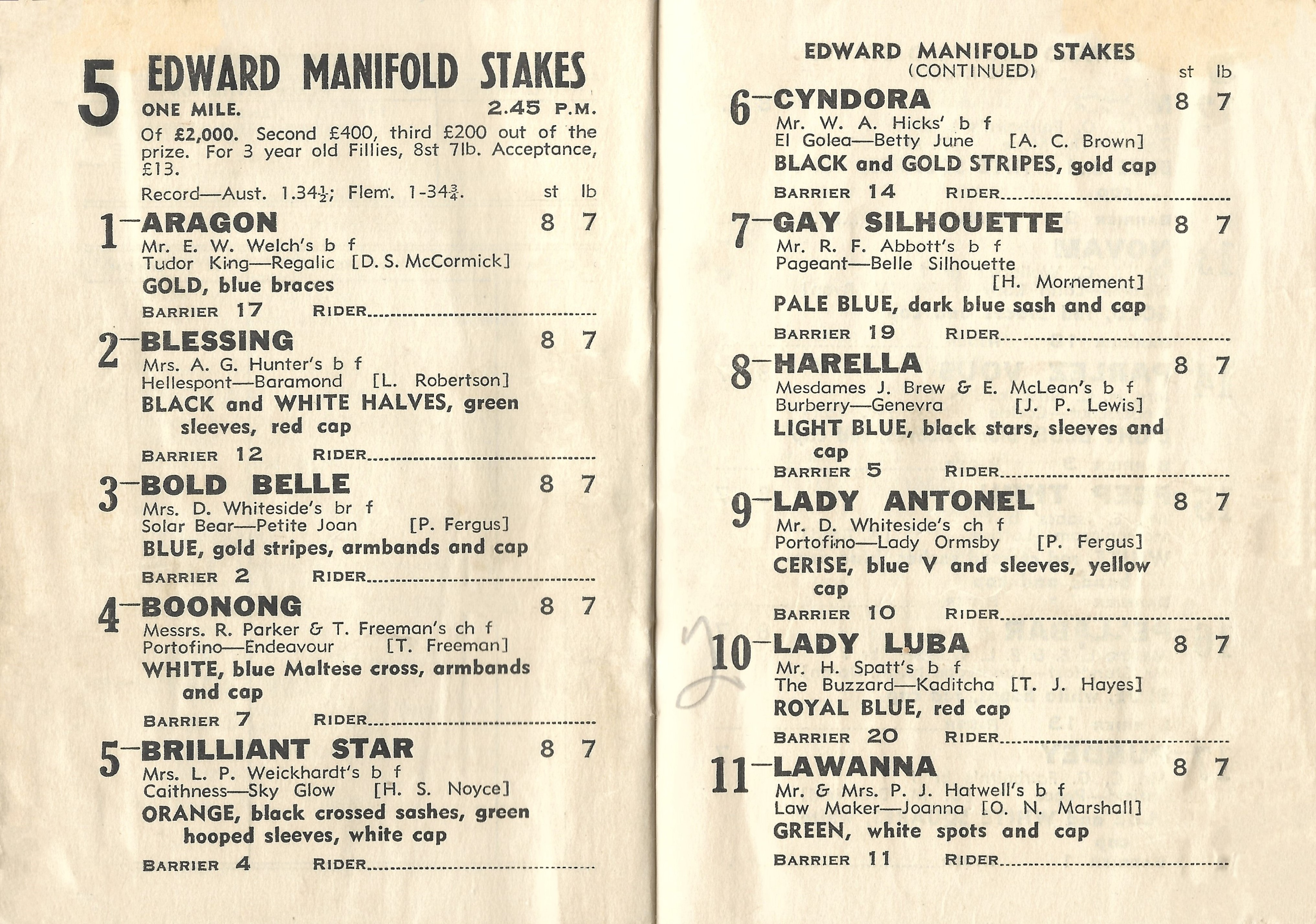
1948 VRC Edward Manifold Stakes page starters and results

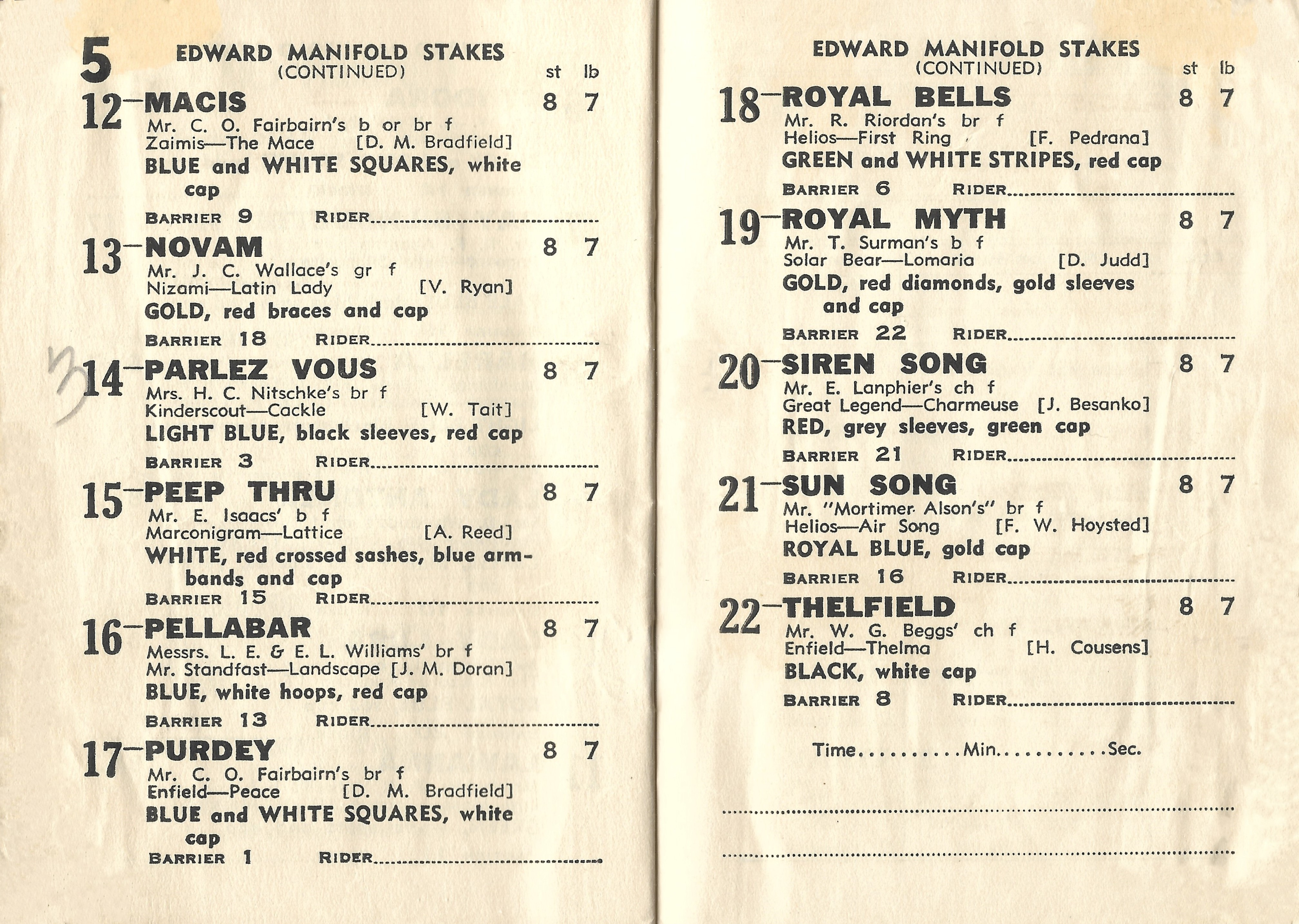
1948 VRC Edward Manifold Stakes page showing the winner, Siren Song

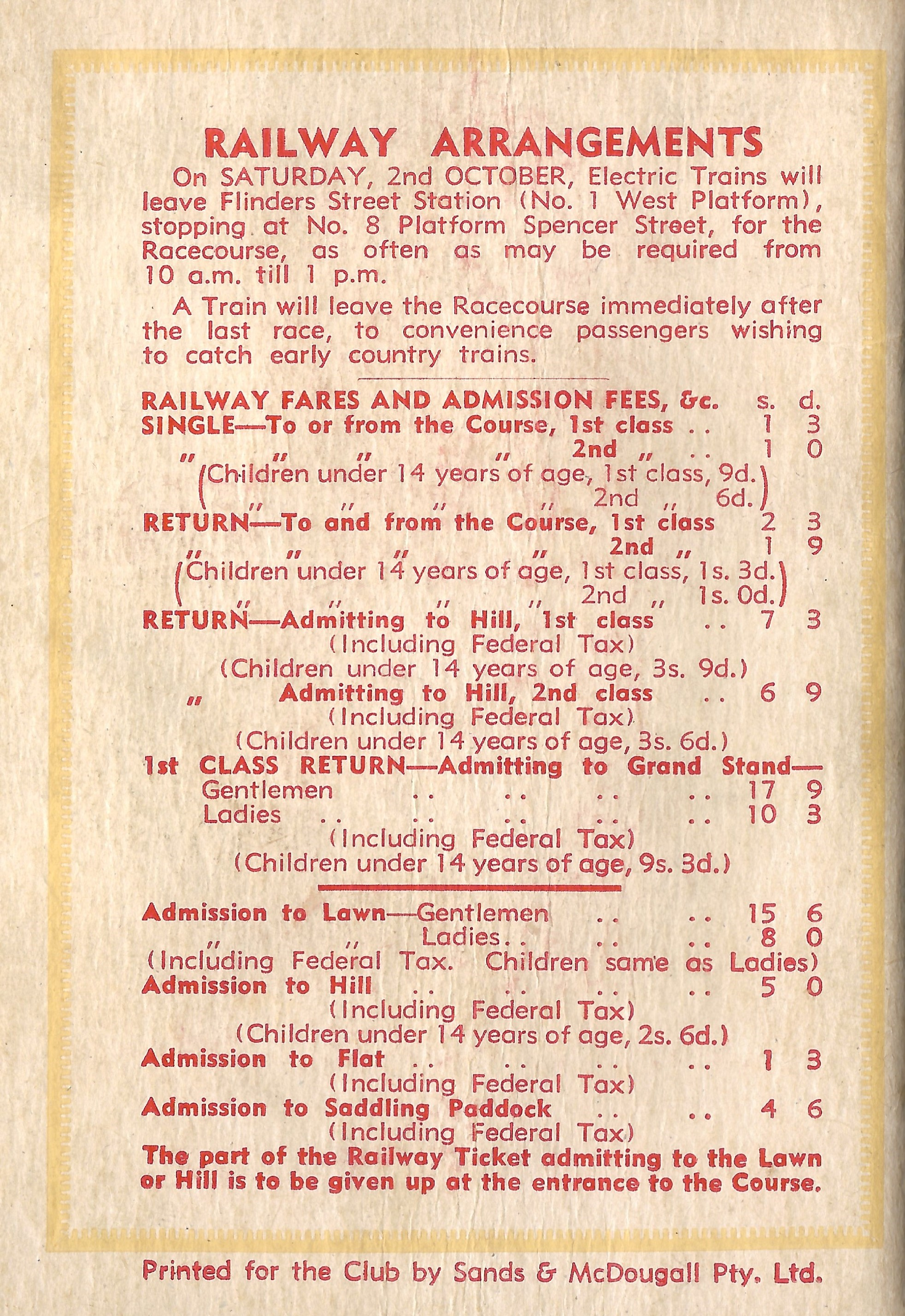
Back cover showing railway and admission charges

== Winners ==
The following are past winners of the race.

- 2026 - Saintly Dancer
- 2025 - Getta Good Feeling
- 2024 - Too Darn Discreet
- 2023 - Zardozi
- 2022 - She's Licketysplit
- 2021 - Elusive Express
- 2020 - Thermosphere
- 2019 - Moonlight Maid
- 2018 - Amphitrite
- 2017 - Bring Me Roses
- 2016 - Serenely Discreet
- 2015 - Badawiya
- 2014 - Fontein Ruby
- 2013 - Se Sauver
- 2012 - Maybe Discreet
- 2011 - Mosheen
- 2010 - Sistine Angel
- 2009 - Majestic Music
- 2008 - Gallica
- 2007 - El Daana
- 2006 - She Will Be Loved
- 2005 - Serenade Rose
- 2004 - Alinghi
- 2003 - Special Harmony
- 2002 - Coupe
- 2001 - Ugachuka
- 2000 - So Gorgeous
- 1999 - My Sienna
- 1998 - Inaflury
- 1997 - Rose Of Danehill
- 1996 - Ascorbic
- 1995 - Rubidium
- 1994 - Love Of Mary
- 1993 - Brompton Cross
- 1992 - Azzurro
- 1991 - Richfield Lady
- 1990 - Twiglet
- 1989 - French Gypsy
- 1988 - Riverina Charm
- 1987 - Midnight Fever
- 1986 - Society Bay
- 1985 - Rebecca Gay
- 1984 - Spirit Of Kingston
- 1983 - Taj Eclipse
- 1982 - Emancipation
- 1981 - Darling Take Care
- 1980 - Tynia
- 1979 - Stage Hit
- 1978 - Shannara
- 1977 - Princess Talaria
- 1976 - Snowmist
- 1975 - Better Vain
- 1974 - Rainburst
- 1973 - Nandalie Lass
- 1972 - Sabot
- 1971 - Special Draw
- 1970 - Dual Choice
- 1969 - Gaelic Spirit
- 1968 - Snowtop
- 1967 - Chosen Lady
- 1966 - Storm Queen
- 1965 - Gipsy Queen
- 1964 - Light Fingers
- 1963 - Our Fun
- 1962 - Arctic Star
- 1961 - Indian Summer
- 1960 - Lady Sybil
- 1959 - Mintaway
- 1958 - Wiggle
- 1957 - Goldenway
- 1956 - Bendrum
- 1955 - Summersette
- 1954 - Biff
- 1953 - Roslyn
- 1952 - Colinga
- 1951 - Lady Havers
- 1950 - Slick Chick
- 1949 - Chicquita
- 1948 - Siren Song
- 1947 - Perm
- 1946 - Joy Stream
- 1945 - Norwich
- 1944 - Delina
- 1943 - Simmering
- 1942 - Mermeran
- 1941 - Primavera
- 1940 - Tranquil Star
- 1939 - Border Lass
- 1938 - Lady Montague
- 1937 - Ena
- 1936 - Siren
- 1935 - Bimilla
- 1934 - Arachne
- 1933 - Hap
- 1932 - Dutchie

== See also ==
- The Bart Cummings
- Danehill Stakes
- Gilgai Stakes
- Rose of Kingston Stakes
- Turnbull Stakes
- List of Australian Group races
- Group races
