= The Bart Cummings =

- Class: Group 3
- Location: Flemington Racecourse, Melbourne, Australia
- Inaugurated: 2003 (formerly the Banjo Paterson Handicap)
- Race type: Thoroughbred
- Sponsor: Lexus (2021-26)

Race information
- Distance: 2,500 metres
- Surface: Turf
- Qualification: Open
- Weight: Quality handicap
- Purse: $350,000 (2026)
- Bonuses: Winner ballot exemption from the Melbourne Cup

The Bart Cummings is a Victoria Racing Club Group 3 Thoroughbred horse race quality handicap, over a distance of 2500-2530 metres. It is held annually at Flemington Racecourse, Melbourne, Australia in early October.

== History ==
=== Name ===
The Bart Cummings is named after legendary trainer Bart Cummings (1927–2015), trainer of twelve Melbourne Cup winners. Previously known as the Banjo Paterson Handicap, the race was named after the famed trainer in 2004.

=== Grade ===
- Prior to 2007 - Handicap
- 2007–2013 - Listed Race
- 2014 onwards - Group 3

=== Distance ===
- 2500 metres - 2010–11, 2016–18,
- 2510 metres - 2020, 2022
- 2520 metres - 2008–09, 2012–15, 2019, 2021, 2023–26
- 2530 metres - 2007

== Winners ==
The following are past winners of the race.

- 2026 - Mr Monaco
- 2025 - Valiant King
- 2024 - Just Fine
- 2023 - Future History
- 2022 - Lunar Flare
- 2021 - Grand Promenade
- 2020 - Persan
- 2019 - Surprise Baby
- 2018 - Avilius
- 2017 - Amelie's Star
- 2016 - Almandin
- 2015 - Let's Make Adeal
- 2014 - Who Shot Thebarman
- 2013 - Araldo
- 2012 - Tanby
- 2011 - Mourayan
- 2010 - Harris Tweed
- 2009 - Light Vision
- 2008 - Light Vision
- 2007 - Dolphin Jo
- 2006 - Irazu
- 2005 - Bugatti Royale
- 2004 - Yakama
- 2003 - Vicksburg

== See also ==
- Danehill Stakes
- Edward Manifold Stakes
- Gilgai Stakes
- Rose of Kingston Stakes
- Turnbull Stakes
- List of Australian Group races
- Group races
