= Hay List =

Australian-bred Thoroughbred racehorse

- Sire: Statue Of Liberty
- Grandsire: Storm Cat
- Dam: Sing Hallelujah
- Damsire: Is It True
- Sex: Gelding
- Foaled: 24 August 2005
- Died: 3 February 2015 (aged 9)
- Country: Australia
- Colour: bay
- Breeder: T. J. Davenport
- Owner: T. J. Davenport, Miss J. Davenport, K. M. Davenport, E. A. Davenport, P. A. Davenport
- Trainer: Jim P Taylor (West Australia); John McNair
- Jockey: Glyn Schofield
- Record: 28-15-6-0
- Earnings: A$2,559,575

Major wins
- Group 1 Manikato Stakes (2010); All Aged Stakes (2011); Newmarket Handicap (2012); Group 2 Gilgai Stakes (2010); Challenge Stakes (2011); Group 3 W J Healy Stakes (2010); McEwen Stakes (2010)

Hay List (24 August 2005 – 3 February 2015) was a thoroughbred racehorse trained and bred in Australia. He won Manikato Stakes and All Aged Stakes, two Group one races. He was known as one of the major rivals of undefeated mare Black Caviar. Hay List won the 1 million-dollar Newmarket Handicap in a close finish on 10 March 2012. Hay List won the race carrying 58 and a half kilograms, a feat not accomplished for over 60 years.

Against all odds Hay List returned to racing after suffering from a fractured knee following a colic surgery in 2012. He was later retired in October 2013 due to long standing issues with his hind foot and the development of a respiratory noise while galloping.

In January 2014 Hay List again defied the medical text books by making a full recovery from a second colic surgery during which his entire caecum had to be removed.

Hay List was euthanised on 3 February 2015 after suffering from laminitis. He was 9 years old.

== Pedigree ==
Pedigree of Hay List, Bay Gelding, 2005
Sire Statue of Liberty dkb. 2000	Storm Cat dkb. 1983	Storm Bird b. 1978	Northern Dancer b. 1961
Sire Statue of Liberty dkb. 2000	Storm Cat dkb. 1983	Storm Bird b. 1978	South Ocean b. 1967
Sire Statue of Liberty dkb. 2000	Storm Cat dkb. 1983	Terlingua ch. 1976	Secretariat ch. 1970
Sire Statue of Liberty dkb. 2000	Storm Cat dkb. 1983	Terlingua ch. 1976	Crimson Saint ch. 1969
Sire Statue of Liberty dkb. 2000	Charming Lassie dkb.1987	Seattle Slew dkb. 1974	Bold Reasoning dkb. 1968
Sire Statue of Liberty dkb. 2000	Charming Lassie dkb.1987	Seattle Slew dkb. 1974	My Charmer b. 1969
Sire Statue of Liberty dkb. 2000	Charming Lassie dkb.1987	Lassie Dear b. 1974	Buckpasser b. 1963
Sire Statue of Liberty dkb. 2000	Charming Lassie dkb.1987	Lassie Dear b. 1974	Gay Missile b.1967
Dam Sing Hallelujah b/br. 1996	Is It True b. 1986	Raja Baba b. 1968	Bold Ruler dkb. 1954
Dam Sing Hallelujah b/br. 1996	Is It True b. 1986	Raja Baba b. 1968	Missy Baba b. 1958
Dam Sing Hallelujah b/br. 1996	Is It True b. 1986	Roman Rockette b. 1977	Proudest Roman dkb. 1968
Dam Sing Hallelujah b/br. 1996	Is It True b. 1986	Roman Rockette b. 1977	Kitchen Window b. 1970
Dam Sing Hallelujah b/br. 1996	Pucesca ch. 1987	Marscay ch. 1979	Biscay ch. 1965
Dam Sing Hallelujah b/br. 1996	Pucesca ch. 1987	Marscay ch. 1979	Heart of Market b. 1967
Dam Sing Hallelujah b/br. 1996	Pucesca ch. 1987	Inner Smile ch. 1987	Kaoru Star ch. 1965
Dam Sing Hallelujah b/br. 1996	Pucesca ch. 1987	Inner Smile ch. 1987	Faith Maker b. 1972
