= Bobbie Lewis Quality =

- Class: Group 2
- Location: Flemington Racecourse, Melbourne, Australia
- Inaugurated: 1974
- Race type: Thoroughbred
- Sponsor: HKJC World Pool (2024 - 2026)

Race information
- Distance: 1,200 metres
- Surface: Turf
- Qualification: Horses four years old and older that are not maidens
- Weight: Quality handicap
- Purse: $300,000 (2026)

The Bobbie Lewis Quality is a Victoria Racing Club, Group 2, Thoroughbred quality handicap horse race for horses of four years old and older, over a distance of 1,200 metres at the Flemington Racecourse, Melbourne, Australia in September.

== History ==
=== Name ===
- 1974–1995 - Bobbie Lewis Quality Handicap
- 1996 - Pat Lalor Quality
- 1997 - Sebel Of Melbourne Quality 1200
- 1998–2000 - Gateway Suites Quality
- 2001–2008 - Bobbie Lewis Quality
- 2009 - Hong Kong Jockey Club Stakes
- 2010 onwards - Bobbie Lewis Quality

=== Grade ===
- 1974–1978 - Listed Race
- 1979–1985 - Principal Race
- 1986–2014 - Group 3
- 2015 onwards - Group 2

== Winners ==
The following are past winners of the race.

- 2026 - Losesomewinmore
- 2025 - Arkansaw Kid
- 2024 - Arkansaw Kid
- 2023 - Star Patrol
- 2022 - Baller
- 2021 - Splintex
- 2020 - Zoutori
- 2019 - Zoutori
- 2018 - Dothraki
- 2017 - Redkirk Warrior
- 2016 - Faatinah
- 2015 - Churchill Dancer
- 2014 - Chautauqua
- 2013 - Speediness
- 2012 - We're Gonna Rock
- 2011 - Lone Rock
- 2010 - Doubtful Jack
- 2009 - Swift Alliance
- 2008 - Bon Hoffa
- 2007 - Bon Hoffa
- 2006 - Bel Danoro
- 2005 - Wildly
- 2004 - Face Value
- 2003 - Titanic Jack
- 2002 - Chong Tong
- 2001 - Scenic Peak
- 2000 - Ruthless Tycoon
- 1999 - Le Zagaletta
- 1998 - El Mirada
- 1997 - Great Condor
- 1996 - Temperate Pug
- 1995 - Cut Up Rough
- 1994 - Hareeba
- 1993 - Golden Sword
- 1992 - Holiday Lover
- 1991 - Street Ruffian
- 1990 - Rare Chance
- 1989 - Undoubted
- 1988 - Placid Ark
- 1987 - Special
- 1986 - Taj Quillo
- 1985 - Base Fee
- 1984 - Sports Ruler
- 1983 - Stellina
- 1982 - Magari
- 1981 - Soldier Of Fortune
- 1980 - Mr. Magic
- 1979 - Bit Of A Skite
- 1978 - Quiet Snort
- 1977 - Nearest
- 1976 - Fiesta Palace
- 1975 - Dark Ruler
- 1974 - Citadel

== See also ==
- Let's Elope Stakes
- Lexus Archer Stakes
- Makybe Diva Stakes
- List of Australian Group races
- Group races
