= Danehill Stakes =

- Class: Group 2
- Location: Flemington Racecourse, Melbourne, Australia
- Inaugurated: 1982
- Race type: Thoroughbred
- Sponsor: Asahi Super Dry (2026)

Race information
- Distance: 1100 metres
- Surface: Turf
- Track: Left-handed
- Qualification: Three years old
- Weight: Set weights with penalties
- Purse: A$300,000 (2026)

The Danehill Stakes is a Victoria Racing Club Group 2 Thoroughbred horse race held at set weights conditions, with penalties, for horses aged three years old over a distance of 1100 metres. It is held annually at Flemington Racecourse, Melbourne, Australia in October.

== History ==
In 2006 the race was renamed in honour of Danehill, the leading sire of winners in Australia for nine consecutive seasons (1996–97 to 2004–05). Prior to 2005 the event was scheduled on the first day of the VRC Spring Carnival - Victoria Derby Day. The VRC moved the race to September. The race known as Ascot Vale Stakes was moved from September to Victoria Derby Day and classified as a Group 1 event.

=== Name ===
- 1982–1986 - The Black Douglas
- 1987–1993 - The Hilton On The Park Stakes
- 1993 - Crown Casino Stakes
- 1994 - Victoria Racing Club Stakes
- 1995–2000 - The Chivas Regal
- 2001–2005 - L'Oreal Plate
- 2006 onwards - Danehill Stakes

=== Distance ===
- 1982–1986 - 1100 metres
- 1987–2020 - 1200 metres
- 2021 onwards - 1100 metres

=== Grade ===
- 1982–1984 - Listed Race
- 1985–2008 - Group 3 race
- 2009 onwards - Group 2 race

== Winners ==
The following are past winners of the race.

- 2026 - The Next Episode
- 2025 - McGaw
- 2024 - First Settler
- 2023 - Stretan Angel
- 2022 - Giga Kick
- 2021 - Kallos
- 2020 - Doubtland
- 2019 - Dalasan
- 2018 - Encryption
- 2017 - Catchy
- 2016 - Saracino
- 2015 - Kinglike
- 2014 - Rich Enuff
- 2013 - Charlie Boy
- 2012 - Snitzerland
- 2011 - Sepoy
- 2010 - Soul
- 2009 - Black Caviar
- 2008 - Aichi
- 2007 - Tan Tat de Lago
- 2006 - The One
- 2005 - Jet Spur
- 2004 - Fastnet Rock
- 2003 - Abdullah
- 2002 - Planchet (Note: In 2002 Choisir crossed the finish line first, but was relegated on protest due to interference.)
- 2001 - Chong Tong
- 2000 - St. Petersburg
- 1999 - Falvelon
- 1998 - Point Danger
- 1997 - Dantelah
- 1996 - Armidale
- 1995 - Gold Ace
- 1994 - I Love Sydney
- 1993 - Dancing Dynamite
- 1992 - Kenfair
- 1991 - Umatilla
- 1990 - Wrap Around
- 1989 - Gin Rhythm
- 1988 - Speeding Fine
- 1987 - Grandiose
- 1986 - Cavalry
- 1985 - Rory's Jester
- 1984 - High Signal
- 1983 - Sculptor
- 1982 - Fiesta Star

== See also ==
- The Bart Cummings
- Edward Manifold Stakes
- Gilgai Stakes
- Rose of Kingston Stakes
- Turnbull Stakes
- List of Australian Group races
- Group races
