= Shaftesbury Avenue (horse) =

Australian-bred Thoroughbred racehorse

- Sire: Salieri
- Dam: Lady Upstage
- Sex: Gelding
- Foaled: 14 September 1986
- Colour: Chestnut
- Trainer: Bart Cummings
- Record: 28: 13-5-3

Major wins
- Group One; George Main Stakes (1990); Honda Stakes (1990); Lightning Stakes (1991); Newmarket Handicap (1991); All-Aged Stakes (1990); Caulfield Stakes (1991)

Honors
- Group 3 Shaftsbury Avenue Handicap (registered)

Shaftesbury Avenue (foaled 14 September 1986) was a versatile Australian racehorse who won Group One races from 1,000 to 2,000 metres, and was placed in the Japan Cup over 2,400 metres. He was a regular rival of Super Impose, and the head-to-head scoreline read four apiece in their eight clashes: Super Impose won the big handicaps, while Shaftesbury Avenue normally prevailed at weight-for-age. Trained by Bart Cummings, the big chestnut gelding won Group One races at Randwick (twice), Flemington (three times), and Caulfield, but failed to handle Moonee Valley in his three starts at the track, and was 12th in the Cox Plate in 1991. Shaftesbury Avenue won 13 of his 28 starts and broke down at Royal Randwick, in 1994, while being prepared for a return to racing.
