= A J Moir Stakes =

Thoroughbred horse race in Melbourne, Victoria, Australia

A.J. Moir Stakes
- Class: Group 1
- Location: Moonee Valley Racecourse, Melbourne, Australia
- Inaugurated: 1976
- Race type: Thoroughbred
- Sponsor: Charter Keck Cramer (2016-26)

Race information
- Distance: 1,000 metres
- Surface: Turf
- Track: Left-handed
- Weight: Weight for Age
- Purse: $750,000 (2026)

The A J Moir Stakes is a Moonee Valley Racing Club Group 1 Thoroughbred horse race for horses aged three years old and over under Weight for age conditions, over a distance of 1000 metres, held at Moonee Valley Racecourse, Melbourne, Australia in late September.

== History ==
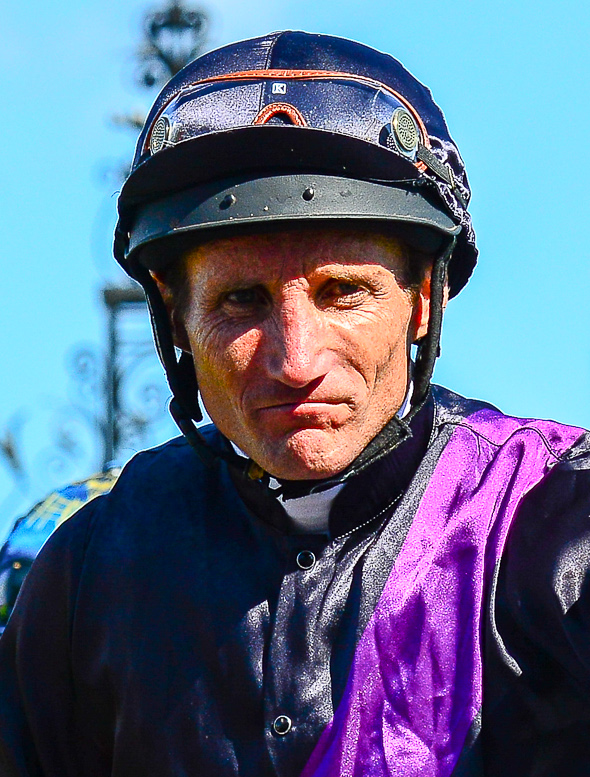
Damien Oliver, who has the most wins of the A J Moir Stakes as jockey

The A J Moir Stakes was named after former Chairman of the Moonee Valley Racing Club (1960–75), long standing committeeman and prominent Melbourne solicitor Alan John Moir KCMG (1903–81) of the Melbourne establishment firm Gillott, Moir and Winneke - now MinterEllison. As a prominent lawyer and company Director he held various other positions including; President of the Victorian Law Institute (1939–40), Director and Chairman of GTV 9 and Director of David Syme and Co Limited (the Age) where he played an important role in the formation of Syme as a public company in 1948. He received a CMG (Companion title Order of Saint Michael and Saint George) title in 1971 for his services to the racing industry.

Alan John Moir was also a great-grandson of former Victorian Premier, Sir Graham Berry and relative to Henry Albert Underwood, of the Underwood racing family.

The AJ Moir Stakes was first run in 1976 and won by Scamanda.

Elevated to Group 2 status in 1979, it has been won by many star sprinters, including:

- Apache Cat, the Australian Champion Sprinter in 2008
- Black Caviar, the Australian Champion Racehorse of the Year in 2011, 2012 and 2013
- Buffering, a three time winner of this race
- Imperatriz, the Australian Champion Sprinter in 2024
- Manikato, the Australian Champion Racehorse of the Year in 1979, who became the second horse to pass $1 million in earnings when he won in 1982
- The Judge (1978–79) and his sister Victoria Peak (1980)
- Miss Andretti, the Australian Champion Racehorse of the Year in 2007
- Nature Strip, the Australian Champion Racehorse of the Year in 2020 and 2022
- Placid Ark, the Australian Champion Racehorse of the Year in 1987
- Schillaci, the eight-time Group One winner.

For the 2013 running of the event the race was upgraded to Group 1 status and moved from the traditional Cox Plate Day card to be run under lights on Friday night before the AFL Grand Final.

=== Distance ===
- 1976–2006 – 1000 metres
- 2007–2014 – 1200 metres
- 2015 onwards - 1000 metres

=== Grade ===
- 1976–1978 - Principal race
- 1979–2012 - Group 2
- 2013 onwards - Group 1

=== Name ===
- 1976–1995 - A.J. Moir Stakes
- 1996–2002 - Schweppes Stakes
- 2003–2006 - Schweppervescence Stakes
- 2006–2011 - Schweppes Stakes
- 2012 onwards - A.J. Moir Stakes

== Records ==
Most successful horse (3 wins):

- Buffering (2012, 2014, 2015)

Leading jockey (4 wins):

- Damien Oliver – Schillaci (1992), Magic Music (1999), Falvelon (2000), Apache Cat (2009)

Leading trainer (4 wins):

- Angus Armanasco – Tetranate (1977), The Judge (1978, 1979), Victoria Peak (1980)
- Bruce McLachlan – With Me (1990, 1991), Al Mansour (1997), Virage De Fortune (2005)

== Winners ==
The following are past winners of this race.

- 2026 - My Gladiola
- 2025 - Baraqiel
- 2024 - Mornington Glory
- 2023 - Imperatriz
- 2022 - Coolangatta
- 2021 - Wild Ruler
- 2020 - Pippie
- 2019 - Nature Strip
- 2018 - Viddora
- 2017 - She Will Reign
- 2016 - Extreme Choice
- 2015 - Buffering
- 2014 - Buffering
- 2013 - Samaready
- 2012 - Buffering
- 2011 - Black Caviar
- 2010 - Black Caviar
- 2009 - Apache Cat
- 2008 - Lucky Secret
- 2007 - Miss Andretti
- 2006 - California Dane
- 2005 - Virage De Fortune
- 2004 - Bomber Bill
- 2003 - Our Egyptian Raine
- 2002 - Spinning Hill
- 2001 - Mistegic
- 2000 - Falvelon
- 1999 - Magic Music
- 1998 - Show No Emotion
- 1997 - Al Mansour
- 1996 - Spartacus
- 1995 - Quality Gold
- 1994 - Sequalo
- 1993 - Sports Works
- 1992 - Schillaci
- 1991 - With Me
- 1990 - With Me
- 1989 - †Good Old Ted / Clay Hero
- 1988 - Scarlet Bisque
- 1987 - Placid Ark
- 1986 - Special
- 1985 - Aquilone
- 1984 - Foystaan
- 1983 - Bold Jet
- 1982 - Manikato
- 1981 - Bold Prospect
- 1980 - Victoria Peak
- 1979 - †The Judge / Grey Sapphire
- 1978 - The Judge
- 1977 - Tetranate
- 1976 - Scamanda

† Dead heat

== See also ==
- Chautauqua Stakes
- List of Australian Group races
- Group races
