= All Our Mob =

Australian-bred Thoroughbred racehorse

- Sire: What A Guest
- Dam: All Sold
- Damsire: Northern Spring
- Sex: Gelding
- Foaled: 1989
- Country: Australia
- Colour: Chestnut
- Trainer: Bryan Guy (at 2, 3 & 4) and Gai Waterhouse (at 5, 6 & 7)
- Record: 74:13-17-15
- Earnings: A$2,596,494

Major wins
- Stradbroke Handicap (1994); Newmarket Handicap (1995); Mackinnon Stakes (1996); All-Aged Stakes (1997)
- Last updated on 7 November 2009

All Our Mob (foaled 1989) was an Australian Thoroughbred racehorse who was a four-time Group One winner. He was by What A Guest (IRE) out of All Sold (Northern Spring (IRE)-Tickets). All Our Mob, who had always shown plenty of speed but a tendency to wilt over the closing stages, blossomed in the latter half of his four-year-old season, in the autumn of 1994. This campaign featured a number of placings in high-class company, including the Doomben 10,000, and culminated with his first Group One win, in the Stradbroke Handicap. The then Federal Opposition Leader, Alexander Downer, tipped All Our Mob in the race, and explained that winning was what 'All our mob is going to do' against ‘Mr Keating’ at the next election. All Our Mob returned at five for a brief spring campaign, which included a second to Schillaci at Caulfield, and defeated Hareeba in the autumn's Newmarket Handicap. Over the next two years, All Our Mob was placed in numerous Group One races, including the Epsom and Doncaster Handicaps and the Cox Plate, and recorded further Group One wins as a seven-year-old in the Mackinnon and the All-Aged Stakes.
