= Black Caviar Lightning =

Black Caviar Lightning registered as the Lightning Stakes
- Class: Group 1
- Location: Flemington Racecourse; Flemington, Victoria
- Inaugurated: 1955
- Race type: Thoroughbred

Race information
- Distance: 1,000 metres
- Surface: Turf
- Track: Straight
- Qualification: Open
- Weight: Weight for Age
- Purse: $1,000,000 (2025)
- Bonuses: see Global Sprint Challenge

The Black Caviar Lightning, registered as the Lightning Stakes, is a Victoria Racing Club Group 1 thoroughbred horse race at Weight for Age, run over a distance of 1000 metres at Flemington Racecourse, Melbourne, Australia in February.

== History ==
The Lightning Stakes forms the first leg of the three leg Autumn sprint series over the Melbourne carnival. It precedes the G1 Oakleigh Plate (1100m, open handicap) at Caulfield Racecourse on the third Saturday in February and the G1 Newmarket Handicap (1200m, open handicap), Australia's most famous sprinting handicap, also run at Flemington on the first Saturday in March. Horses contesting this race may also head to the G1 William Reid Stakes at Moonee Valley Racecourse, run over 1200m at weight-for-age in March.

=== Name ===
The name of the race changed from the Lightning Stakes in 2013, to honour sprinting superstar Black Caviar, who won the race in 2011, 2012 and 2013.

=== Distance ===
- 1955–1972 - 5 furlongs (~1000 metres)
- 1973 onwards - 1000 metres

=== Grade ===
- 1955–1979 - Principal race
- 1980–1986 - Group 2
- 1987 onwards - Group 1

=== Venue ===
In 2007 the race was run at Moonee Valley Racecourse due to refurbishment work at Flemington Racecourse.

=== International affiliation ===
Since 2005 the race has been the first leg of the Global Sprint Challenge, followed by the Australia Stakes and from 2008 followed by the King's Stand Stakes when the Australia Stakes was replaced as a leg of the series by The Age Classic. Until Nicconi's defeat in the 2010 King's Stand Stakes at Royal Ascot held in June, this race has proved an outstanding guide to the winner of that race, with Choisir (2003), Takeover Target (2006), Miss Andretti (2007) and Scenic Blast (2009) all winning this race before subsequently winning at Royal Ascot later that year.

=== Most wins ===
- Trainer - Bart Cummings (8)
- Jockey - Damien Oliver (5)
- Horse - Black Caviar (3)

== Winners ==
The following are past winners of the race.

- 2026 - Tentyris
- 2025 - Skybird
- 2024 - Imperatriz
- 2023 - Coolangatta
- 2022 - Home Affairs
- 2021 – Nature Strip
- 2020 – Gytrash
- 2019 – In Her Time
- 2018 – Redkirk Warrior
- 2017 – Terravista
- 2016 – Chautauqua
- 2015 – Lankan Rupee
- 2014 – Snitzerland
- 2013 – Black Caviar
- 2012 – Black Caviar
- 2011 – Black Caviar
- 2010 – Nicconi
- 2009 – Scenic Blast
- 2008 – Apache Cat
- 2007 – Miss Andretti
- 2006 – Takeover Target
- 2005 – Fastnet Rock
- 2004 – Regimental Gal
- 2003 – Choisir
- 2002 – Spinning Hill
- 2001 – Sports
- 2000 – Testa Rossa
- 1999 – Isca
- 1998 – General Nediym
- 1997 – Mahogany
- 1996 – Gold Ace
- 1995 – Mahogany
- 1994 – Keltrice
- 1993 – Schillaci
- 1992 – Schillaci
- 1991 – Shaftesbury Avenue
- 1990 – Redelva
- 1989 – Zeditave
- 1988 – Special
- 1987 – Placid Ark
- 1986 – Hula Chief
- 1985 – River Rough
- 1984 – River Rough
- 1983 – Demus
- 1982 – He's A Haze
- 1981 – Countess Marizza
- 1980 – Sportscast
- 1979 – The Judge
- 1978 – Maybe Mahal
- 1977 – Maybe Mahal
- 1976 – Desirable
- 1975 – Cap D'antibes
- 1974 – Century
- 1973 – Make Mine Roses
- 1972 – Zambari
- 1971 – Dual Choice
- 1970 – Black Onyx
- 1969 – Mister Hush
- 1968 – Begonia Belle
- 1967 – Storm Queen
- 1966 – Citius
- 1965 – Marmion
- 1964 – Wenona Girl
- 1963 – Wenona Girl
- 1962 – Sky High
- 1961 – Sky High
- 1960 – Todman
- 1959 – Ritmar
- 1958 – Misting
- 1957 – Copper Year
- 1956 – Apple Bay
- 1955 – Gay Vista

== See also ==
- List of Australian Group races
- Group races
