= Rubiton Stakes =

- Class: Group 2
- Location: Caulfield Racecourse, Sandown Racecourse
- Inaugurated: 1989
- Race type: Thoroughbred
- Sponsor: Here For The Horses (2026)

Race information
- Distance: 1100 metres
- Surface: Turf
- Track: Left-handed
- Qualification: Three years old and older Maidens ineligible
- Weight: Set weights with penalties
- Purse: A$300,000 (2026)

The Rubiton Stakes is a Melbourne Racing Club Group 2 Thoroughbred horse race held under set weights with penalties conditions, for horses aged three years old and upwards, over a distance of 1100 metres at Caulfield Racecourse, Melbourne, Australia in February.

== History ==
The race is named after the outstanding sire and 1987 Cox Plate winner Rubiton.

=== Grade ===
- 1989–1991 - Listed race
- 1992–2012 - Group 3 race
- 2013 onwards - Group 2

=== Distance ===
- 1989–1996 – 1000 metres
- 1997–2005 – 1100 metres
- 2006 – 1000 metres
- 2007 onwards - 1100 metres

=== Venue ===
- 1989–1993 - Sandown Racecourse
- 1994–1995 - Caulfield Racecourse
- 1996 - Sandown Racecourse
- 1997–2005 - Caulfield Racecourse
- 2006 - Sandown Racecourse
- 2007–2022 - Caulfield Racecourse
- 2023 Sandown Racecourse
- 2024 onwards - Caulfield Racecourse

=== Conditions ===
- 1989–2009 - Weight for Age
- 2010 - set weights with penalties

== Winners ==
The following are past winners of the race.

- 2026 - Oak Hill
- 2025 - Rey Magnerio
- 2024 - Kallos
- 2023 - Lofty Strike
- 2022 - Marine One
- 2021 - Prophet's Thumb
- 2020 - Anaheed
- 2019 - Nature Strip
- 2018 - Super Cash
- 2017 - Super Cash
- 2016 - Heatherly
- 2015 - Chautauqua
- 2014 - Lankan Rupee
- 2013 - Adebisi
- 2012 - Eagle Falls
- 2011 - Catapulted
- 2010 - Here De Angels
- 2009 - Mind Your Head
- 2008 - Here De Angels
- 2007 - Dance The Waves
- 2006 - Bomber Bill
- 2005 - Super Elegant
- 2004 - Super Elegant
- 2003 - Super Elegant
- 2002 - Intelligent Star
- 2001 - †Appoint / Cullen
- 2000 - Miss Pennymoney
- 1999 - Flavour
- 1998 - Al Mansour
- 1997 - Spartacus
- 1996 - Stalk
- 1995 - Schillaci
- 1994 - Alannon
- 1993 - Schillaci
- 1992 - Mavournae
- 1991 - Redelva
- 1990 - Kingston Heritage
- 1989 - Zeditave

† Dead heat

== See also ==
- List of Australian Group races
- Group races
