= Schillaci (horse) =

Australian-bred Thoroughbred racehorse

- Sire: Salieri
- Grandsire: Accipiter
- Dam: Biscarina
- Damsire: Biscay
- Sex: Gelding
- Foaled: 1988
- Country: Australia
- Colour: Grey
- Trainer: Lee Freedman
- Record: 36: 16-5-5
- Earnings: A$2,319,128

Major wins
- Group One; Lightning Stakes (1992 & 1993); Oakleigh Plate (1992); Newmarket Handicap (1992); The Galaxy (1992); Futurity Stakes (1993 & 1995); George Ryder Stakes (1993); Group Two; QTC Cup (1992); Moir Stakes (1992); Stanley Wootton Stakes (1993); Group Three; Rubiton Stakes (1993 & 1995); Caulfield Sprint (1994)

Honours
- Schillaci Stakes
- Last updated on 15 October 2009

Schillaci (1988–2001) was an Australian Thoroughbred racehorse who was an eight-time Group One winner. He was by Salieri (USA) out of Biscarina (Biscay-Forina).

== Background ==
Schillaci was purchased in the 1990 yearling sales for $70,000, and was named after Salvatore Schillaci, who was the leading goal scorer at the 1990 World Cup.

Another horse, purchased with Schillaci, was named Baggio - after Roberto Baggio, one of Salvatore Schillaci's teammates. Baggio was a consistent stakes performer in Brisbane.

== Racing career ==
Schillaci was unraced at two, and made his debut in a Kyneton maiden on 22 October 1991, where he defeated Mavournae, who, like Schillaci, would go on to win the Rubiton Stakes. Schillaci was spelled after two more starts, which produced a win in fast time at Sandown in late-November. In the new year, Schillaci was catapulted straight into Group One company, and won the Lightning Stakes, the Oakleigh Plate, and the Newmarket Handicap in successive starts. In winning these races, the grey had become a triple-Group One winner after just six starts, and only the second horse, after Placid Ark in 1987, to complete the treble. Schillaci was then taken to Sydney, where he was beaten on protest by Alishan in the Canterbury Stakes, and won his fourth Group One race, The Galaxy. In Brisbane, he added the QTC Cup, and carried the big weight of 56.5 kilograms when unplaced behind Rough Habit in the Stradbroke Handicap.

At four, Schillaci won a further six races, including Group One wins in the Lightning, the Futurity, and the George Ryder Stakes. He failed to win in five starts at five, but won three more races at six. According to trainer Lee Freedman, Schillaci was 'never quite right' as an older horse, but made a winning comeback in the Caulfield Sprint, on Cup day, and won his final Group One race in the autumn's Futurity Stakes.

== Retirement ==
After his final start – a second in the Stradbroke Handicap – Schillaci was retired to a property near Seymour.
