= Australia Stakes =

Australia Stakes registered as the Stanley Wootten Stakes
- Class: Group 2
- Location: Moonee Valley Racecourse; Melbourne, Victoria
- Inaugurated: 1989
- Race type: Thoroughbred - Flat racing
- Sponsor: Clamms Seafood (2025)
- Website: MVRC official website

Race information
- Distance: 1,200 metres
- Surface: Turf
- Track: Left-handed
- Qualification: Three years old and older
- Weight: Weight for Age
- Purse: AUS$350,000 (2025)

The Australia Stakes, registered as the Stanley Wootton Stakes, is a Moonee Valley Racing Club Group 2 Thoroughbred horse race raced under weight for age conditions, for three year olds and older, over a distance of 1200 metres at Moonee Valley Racecourse in Melbourne, Australia in late January.

== History ==
Originally the race was scheduled in March, but in 2002 the MVRC moved the race to late January. The renaming of the race to the current name coincides with the Australia Day public holiday.

=== Grade ===
- 1989 - Listed Race
- 1990–1993 - Group 3
- 1994 onwards Group 2

=== Name ===
- 1989–1997 - Stanley Wootton Stakes
- 1998–2009 - Norman Carlyon Stakes
- 2010 onwards - Australia Stakes

=== Venue ===
In 1995 the race was held at Flemington Racecourse.

=== Record ===
Hareeba ran the race record time of 1:08.4 down the straight track at Flemington Racecourse. The race record at Moonee Valley was recorded by Dark Beau with a time of 1:09.1.

== Winners ==
Past winners of the race are as follows.

- 2026 - Hedged
- 2025 - Schwarz
- 2024 - Veight
- 2023 - Jigsaw
- 2022 - Marabi
- 2021 - Streets of Avalon
- 2020 - Scales Of Justice
- 2019 - Whispering Brook
- 2018 - Thronum
- 2017 - Malaguerra
- 2016 - Holler
- 2015 - Mourinho
- 2014 - Richie's Vibe
- 2013 - Sea Lord
- 2012 - Black Caviar
- 2011 - Whitefriars
- 2010 - Black Caviar
- 2009 - Lucky Secret
- 2008 - Let Go Thommo
- 2007 - El Segundo
- 2006 - California Dane
- 2005 - Super Elegant
- 2004 - Vocabulary
- 2003 - Yell
- 2002 - Royal Code
- 2001 - Piavonic
- 2000 - Slavonic
- 1999 - Sports
- 1998 - Flavour
- 1997 - Clang
- 1996 - All Our Mob
- 1995 - Hareeba
- 1994 - Kenvain
- 1993 - Schillaci
- 1992 - Dapper's Hope
- 1991 - Dark Beau
- 1990 - Redelva
- 1989 - Jet Fighter

== See also ==
- List of Australian Group races
- Group races
