= Placid Ark =

Australian-bred Thoroughbred racehorse

- Sire: Arkenstone
- Grandsire: Zvornik
- Dam: Northern Queen
- Damsire: Star of the North
- Sex: Gelding
- Foaled: 1983
- Country: Australia
- Colour: Bay
- Breeder: Asprey Stud
- Owner: Eight-person syndicate
- Trainer: Wally Mitchell
- Record: 21: 14-2-1
- Earnings: $771,300

Major wins
- Lee Steere Classic (1987); Lightning Stakes (1987); Oakleigh Plate (1987); Newmarket Handicap (1987); Canterbury Stakes (1987); Sir Rupert Steele Stakes (1987); A J Moir Stakes (1987); Linlithgow Stakes (1987); Winterbottom Stakes (1987); Bobby Lewis Quality (1988)

Awards
- Australian Co-Champion Racehorse of the Year (1987)

Honors
- Placid Ark Stakes at Ascot Racecourse

Placid Ark (1983-1988) was an Australian thoroughbred foaled in Western Australia. His sire Arkenstone was a winning son of the Western Australian champion sire Zvornik and his dam was Northern Queen a mare bred in South Australia by the United States imported stallion Star of the North.

Bred at Asprey Stud near Pinjarra by H.B (Pip) Dent, Placid Ark was purchased at the Sunspeed Yearling Sales for $5,000 for a novice eight-person syndicate headed by Hotelier Barry McGrath on the recommendation of Ascot Racecourse trainer Wally Mitchell. Wally Mitchell was persuaded to purchase the horse by the breeder, H.B. (Pip) Dent. Pip was so convinced of the quality of the horse that he offered to give Wally his money back if the horse didn't win (cited in West Australian newspaper's obituary of Pip Dent).

Placid Ark earned number of wins as a two-year-old including the first ever defeat of star filly Jungle Dawn who later campaigned successfully in the United States of America and after making a promising start in his three-year-old season in Perth, Western Australia, plans were made to take him to Melbourne to contest the autumn sprinters treble of the Lightning Stakes, Oakleigh Plate & Newmarket Handicap. Placid Ark made history when he became the first horse to win all three races in the same season. Accompanying Placid Ark on the trip was New South Wales born jockey John Scorse who had relocated to Perth as stable rider for Mitchell.

Placid Ark's performances in the 1986-87 racing season resulted in him being voted a co-winner of Australian Champion Racehorse of the Year honors, alongside Bonecrusher.

Out of racing for a time due to an injury, Placid Ark came back in 1988 to win the Bobby Lewis Quality before a shattered sesamoid resulted in the gelding having to be euthanized.

The Listed Placid Ark Stakes, held at Ascot Racecourse in Western Australia, is named in his honour.
