= Black Caviar =

Australian thoroughbred racehorse (2006–2024)

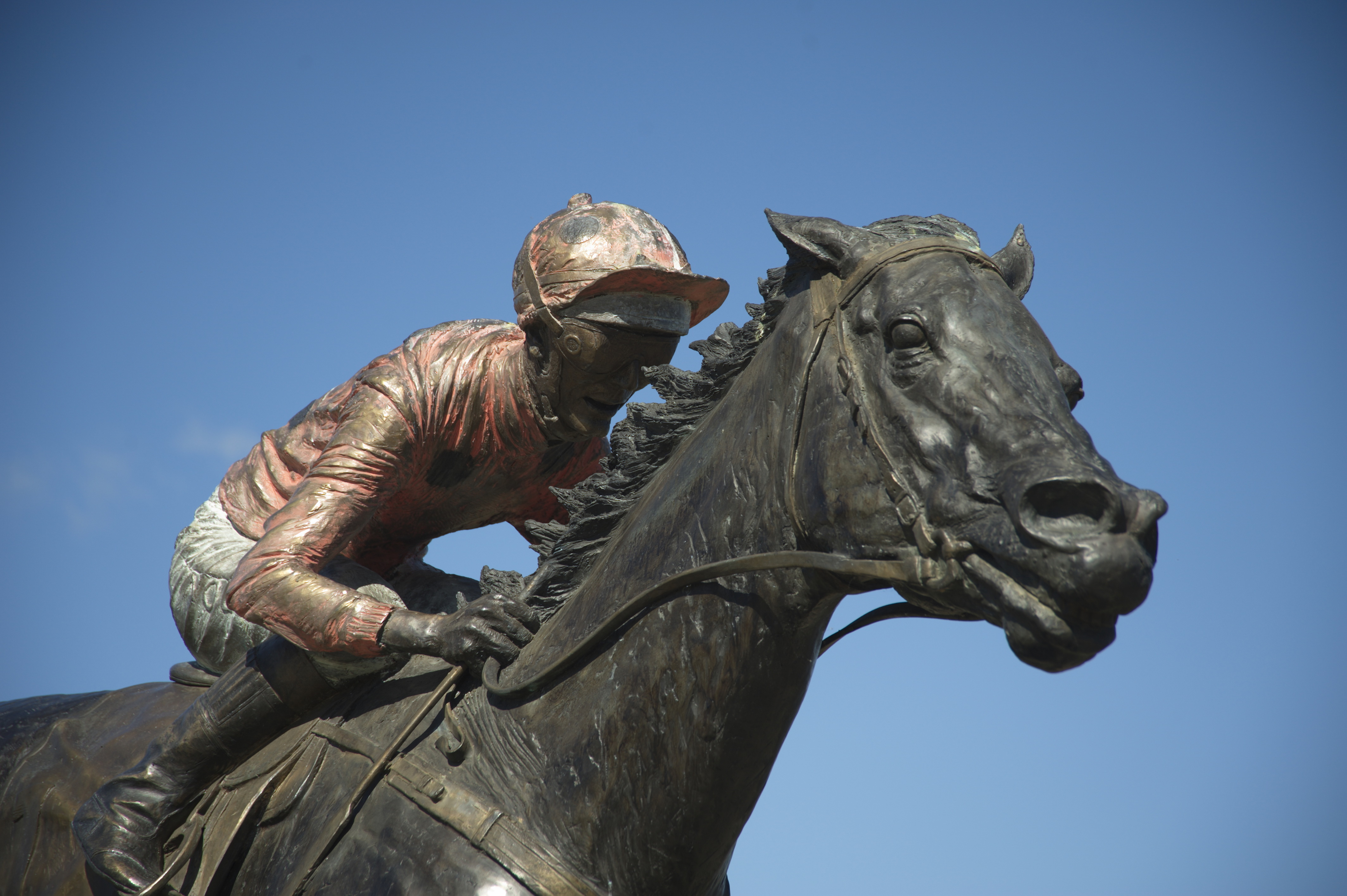
- Statue of Black Caviar, Nagambie
- Sire: Bel Esprit (AUS)
- Grandsire: Royal Academy (USA)
- Dam: Helsinge (AUS)
- Damsire: Desert Sun (GB)
- Sex: Mare (female)
- Foaled: 18 August 2006; Nagambie, Victoria, Australia
- Died: 17 August 2024 (aged 17); Scone, New South Wales, Australia
- Country: Australia
- Colour: Dark bay
- Breeder: R. Jamieson, Vic
- Owner: G.J. Wilkie, K.J. Wilkie, Werrett Bloodstock Pty Ltd, C.H. Madden, J. Madden, P.A. Hawkes, D.M. Taylor, J. Taylor
- Racing colours: Salmon, Black Spots, Salmon And Black Spots Cap
- Trainer: Peter Moody
- Record: 25: 25–0–0
- Earnings: $7,953,936

Major wins
- GBR Diamond Jubilee Stakes (2012); VRC Newmarket Handicap (2011); VRC Lightning Stakes (2011, 2012, 2013); VRC Patinack Farm Classic (2010, 2011); ATC T J Smith Stakes (2011, 2013); MVRC William Reid Stakes (2011, 2013); BTC Cup (2011); MRC C F Orr Stakes (2012); MVRC Australia Stakes (2010, 2012); MRC Schillaci Stakes (2010, 2011); MVRC Schweppes Stakes (2010, 2011); VRC Danehill Stakes (2009)

Awards
- 1st in World Thoroughbred Rankings (2013); WTRR World Champion Sprinter (2010, 2011, 2012, 2013); Australian Racehorse of the Year (2011, 2012, 2013); Australian Champion Sprinter (2011, 2012, 2013); European Champion Sprinter (2012)

Honours
- Black Caviar Lightning (2013); Australian Racing Hall of Fame (2013); Timeform Rating: 136
- Last updated on 15 July 2022

Black Caviar (18 August 2006 – 17 August 2024) was an Australian champion Thoroughbred racehorse who was undefeated in 25 races, including 15 Group Ones, an Australian record. She was the 2010, 2011, 2012, and 2013 WTRR World Champion Sprinter. Black Caviar was trained by Melbourne-based trainer Peter Moody. Other than in her first two runs and in one race in 2010, she was ridden by Luke Nolen. The mare was retired on 17 April 2013. According to an ABC Catalyst episode from 2015, she was never whipped.

== Background ==
Black Caviar was born on 18 August 2006 at 5:20 am at Gilgai Farm in Nagambie, Victoria. She grew up on the Goulburn River property and then went to Swettenham Stud in December 2007 for a 10-week yearling preparation where she was then sold on behalf of Rick Jamieson to Peter Moody for $210,000 at the Melbourne Premier Yearling Sale. She was owned by G. J. Wilkie, K. J. Wilkie, Werrett Bloodstock Pty Ltd, C. H. Madden, J. Madden, P. A. Hawkes, D. M. Taylor and J. Taylor. She was sired by Bel Esprit, winner of the Doomben 10,000, which also sired Bel Mer, a mare that won the Robert Sangster Stakes in 2009. Black Caviar was the first foal of her unraced dam Helsinge, a daughter of the British racehorse Desert Sun, that never won a major race but was placed in the Craven Stakes and the Sandown Mile. Desert Sun also sired the champion New Zealand racemare, Sunline. Helsinge is also the dam of All Too Hard, winner of the 2013 All Aged Stakes, the 2013 Futurity Stakes, the 2013 C F Orr Stakes, the 2012 Caulfield Guineas and runner-up in the 2012 Cox Plate. As a descendant of the British broodmare Pinprick, Black Caviar is a product of the same branch of Thoroughbred family 1-p, which also produced the Classic winners Ambiguity and Sodium.

Black Caviar weighed about 570 kg (1,260 lb) and stood 16.2 hands (66 inches, 168 cm) high. In looks, size, and conformation, Black Caviar resembled her grandsire, Royal Academy, and great-grandsire, Nijinsky, who won the English Triple Crown.

== Racing career ==
=== 2008–2009: Two-year-old season ===
Black Caviar started twice as a two-year-old, winning her debut by 5 lengths before claiming the listed Blue Sapphire Stakes by 6 lengths.

=== 2009–2010: Three-year-old season ===
Returning as a three-year-old, she won first-up in a listed race by 4 lengths. Stepping up to Group 2 level in the Danehill Stakes at Flemington, she caused concern when she stumbled at the start; however, she recovered to keep her winning run going, beating the colt Wanted, by ¾ of a length. Moody, commenting on the mishap in the early stages said "I certainly had my heart in my mouth". A chest muscle injury sustained in the start kept her out of racing until the following January. That resuming run saw her take on the older horses in the Group 2 Australia Stakes at Moonee Valley, where she won by 2½ lengths. Shortly after the race, the filly sustained an injury to a suspensory ligament in her right foreleg which kept her out for the rest of the season.

=== 2010–2011: Four-year-old season ===
Returning as a four-year-old in October 2010, Black Caviar won two more Group 2 races: the Schillaci Stakes at Caulfield and the Moir Stakes at Moonee Valley by 5½ lengths. She then was set for her first Group 1 race in the Patinack Farm Classic at Flemington, where she took on a field that included the highly rated Western Australian sprinter Hay List, along with multiple Group 1 winners Star Witness, Melito and All Silent. Black Caviar produced what was described as "an astonishing demolition job" and won by 4 lengths. After the race, the veteran trainer Lee Freedman, who had conditioned outstanding sprinters including Miss Andretti described Black Caviar as "the best I have seen".

She resumed in February 2011 in the Lightning Stakes, where she defeated Hay List by 3½ lengths, being eased down well short of the winning post. Her next start saw her carry topweight of 58 kg in the Newmarket Handicap at Flemington. Despite the weight, she again won in similar ease to her previous Group 1 wins and set a race record in the process. This performance earned her a rating of 130 from the IFHA, which made her the number one ranked horse in the world in the period of October 2010 to March 2011. The rating placed her only three pounds behind Dayjur, the highest rated sprinter of the previous 30 years. A fourth successive Group 1 win came in the William Reid Stakes at Moonee Valley before she ventured to Randwick in Sydney for the T J Smith Stakes. In this race, which attracted a crowd of 30,000, Hay List established a clear break on the field at the top of the straight and a huge upset briefly appeared possible. Black Caviar, however, accelerated past Hay List in the closing stages and won in very impressive style by 3 lengths. The Herald Sun described her performance as "brilliant, dominant and unforgettable".

She then travelled to Brisbane for the BTC Cup at Doomben, where she attracted a crowd of over 20,000, for another clash with Hay List. She won by 2 lengths over Hay List, which once again ran a clear second placing and confirmed his standing as Black Caviar's main rival. Buffering was a further 5 lengths away in third place. Black Caviar was expected to end her season in the Doomben 10,000; however, her connections instead decided to spell her until the Australian spring.

In the annual Victorian Thoroughbred Racing Awards, members of the racing media voted Black Caviar as Horse of the Year by 150 votes to 134 over So You Think.

=== 2011–2012: Five-year-old season ===
Black Caviar started her five-year-old season by winning her second Schillaci Stakes by 4¼ lengths. With this victory, she equalled Phar Lap's record of 14 straight wins. She won her 15th race in the Moir Stakes by a 6-length margin. She maintained her unbeaten record with win number 16 in the Patinack Farm Classic by 2.8 lengths from Buffering and Mid Summer Music. After the Patinack Farm Classic, Black Caviar was spelled for the remainder of the spring racing season.

On 27 January 2012, she returned to racing by winning the 1200-metre Group 2 Australia Stakes at Moonee Valley by 4.3 lengths in a time of 1.09.44 to remain undefeated over 17 starts. She then stepped up to 1400 metres for the first (and only) time on 11 February in the C F Orr Stakes at Caulfield. The distance and wet track conditions led to media speculation that her unbeaten run was under threat, but she again won comfortably by 3.3 lengths in front of a crowd of 20,000.

Black Caviar backed up a week later in the Coolmore Lightning Stakes on 18 February over 1000 metres, where she was once again pitted against Hay List. She was challenged up until the 200m mark, then extended away to win by nearly 2 lengths. The win put her equal with American horse Peppers Pride with 19 wins from 19 starts and behind only Kincsem, which won all 54 of her races. She also equalled the long-standing Australasian record of successive wins jointly held by Desert Gold and Gloaming.

On 28 April 2012, she won the Group 1 Robert Sangster Stakes by 4½ lengths at Morphettville and in the process set a new Australasian record of 20 straight wins from 20 starts. The win also took her past the then-unbeaten run of the American mare Zenyatta. Moody commented on her record-breaking run by saying that "Luke was pretty kind to her, he gave her one little smack on the bum and she did the rest." Black Caviar returned to Morphettville two weeks later, winning the Goodwood Handicap by 1 length without being ridden out.

==== Royal Ascot ====
In June, she was sent overseas for the first time for the Diamond Jubilee Stakes at Royal Ascot. On the 30-hour flight from Australia to the United Kingdom, she wore a specially designed "compression suit" which helped blood circulation. Racing over a straight six furlongs on rain-softened turf, Black Caviar won the Diamond Jubilee Stakes by a head from the French-trained filly Moonlight Cloud, with Restiadargent a neck away in third. Nolen sent the mare past the Frankie Dettori-ridden Soul inside the last quarter-mile but after establishing a clear lead, he began to ease Black Caviar. Moonlight Cloud moved up on the stands side to draw almost level before Nolen began driving Black Caviar again in the final strides. Nolen said that his over-confidence had been a factor in the closeness of the finish: "It was an error that every apprentice is taught not to do, and I got away with it today." It was discovered during after-race X-rays that Black Caviar had sustained an eight-centimetre muscle tear somewhere in the race. Nolen felt the change in the horse and said he 'thought she'd done enough to get home. I didn't want to annoy her any more.' Moody explained the mare had not coped with the 11,000-mile journey as well as he had hoped or expected. He also described her as appearing "tired and worn out" after the race. An examination by veterinarian Peter Angus and chiropractor Michael Bryant later revealed that Black Caviar sustained a grade-four tear of the quadriceps and a grade-two tear of the sacroiliac during the race. It was announced that Black Caviar would return to Australia to recover and bypass the originally intended second stage of her international challenge in the July Cup. On 26 June, Moody explained that Black Caviar was expected to recover from her injuries and that, after an extended break, she would be prepared for a third Patinack Farm Classic. On 31 July connections decided Black Caviar would not race during the spring carnival.

In November 2012, Black Caviar was named European Champion Sprinter at the Cartier Racing Awards, becoming the first horse trained outside Europe to be so honoured.

Horses foaled in Australia have their official "birthdays" on 1 August, whereas in the Northern Hemisphere, horses have their ages advanced by one year on 1 January. This anomaly led to Black Caviar being officially described as a six-year-old when she ran in England in June 2012, although she was still a five-year-old by Southern Hemisphere reckoning.

Jockey Luke Nolen has since stated he has never watched the replay of her Royal Ascot success, saying "After she passed Racing.com had a tribute to her, I sat down with a beer and the second that race came on I walked out of the room. All the fuss the English Media made about the performance has ruined the win for me, when we really should be praising her for her performance",

=== 2012–2013: Six-year-old season ===
In February 2013, Black Caviar stretched her unbeaten run to 23 by winning the Lightning Stakes, breaking the course record which had stood for 25 years. It was the third time she had won the event. On 21 February 2013, Black Caviar was inducted into the Australian Racing Hall of Fame. This was only the second time an active competitor has been so honoured.

In March, Black Caviar made it 24 wins from 24 starts by winning the William Reid Stakes by 4 lengths. It was her 14th Group 1 win, equalling the record of Kingston Town.

On 13 April 2013, Black Caviar won the 2013 TJ Smith Stakes. It was the mare's 25th consecutive win and 15th group 1 win, breaking the Australian record for the most group 1 wins by a horse. The record was previously held by Kingston Town with 14. On 17 April 2013 she was once again ranked on top of the international thoroughbred rankings with a timeform rating of 136.

== Breeding career ==
On 17 April 2013, it was announced that Black Caviar was officially retired from racing. Trainer Peter Moody said, "The connections of the horse and I decided 25 was a great number and she did us proud on Saturday." Shortly after, a life-sized bronze statue, by sculptor Mitch Mitchell, of the champion mare was unveiled in the township of Nagambie.

In the early morning hours of 13 September 2014, Black Caviar gave birth to her first foal, a bay filly by Exceed And Excel. Oscietra was retired aged three after winning two of her five starts.

Her second foal, Prince Of Caviar, a colt by Sebring was foaled in September 2015.

In 2016, Black Caviar foaled a filly by Snitzel, followed in 2017 by a filly by More than Ready.

In 2017 and 2018, Black Caviar produced a colt and a filly by I Am Invincible. The filly, Invincible Caviar, won four of her eight starts before dying in 2023. In 2020 there was no foal, following an unsuccessful covering.

Persian Caviar, by Written Tycoon, was foaled in 2021 and won on her debut in December 2024. There was no foal in 2022, following two unsuccessful coverings. In 2023, Black Caviar foaled a colt by The Autumn Sun.

Black Caviar was euthanized on 17 August 2024, a day after giving birth to a colt by Snitzel. She had been suffering from laminitis for several weeks.. The foal died days later.

== Assessment ==
On 31 March 2011, Black Caviar was rated one of the top Thoroughbred racehorses in the world (with a 136 rating) for the first quarter of 2011 by Timeform. On 17 April 2013, she was once again ranked on top of the international rankings with a rating of 136. On 3 May 2013, Black Caviar was officially listed as the world's best horse for the period 1 November 2012 to 28 April 2013, by the International Federation of Horseracing Authorities (IFHA), who compile the World Thoroughbred Racehorse Rankings. Overall Black Caviar is rated as the equal 76th-best flat racing horse in Timeform's history and the equal highest-rated filly or mare, 11 lb lower than Timeform's highest-rated horse Frankel (147). Timeform has been rating flat racing thoroughbreds in Britain since its founding in 1948, Thoroughbreds beyond Britain only "more recently" and horses who have raced exclusively in America only since approximately 2000. Timeform rates only seven sprinters above Black Caviar.

== Race record ==
2008–09 season as a two-year-old
Result	Date	Race	Venue	Group	Distance	Weight (kg)	Jockey	Time	2nd	Margins
Won	18 April 2009	2yo Hcp Restricted	Flemington	NA	1000 m	51.5	Jarrad Noske	0:56.63	2nd – Kwassa Kwassa	5.0 x 0.3
Won	2 May 2009	Blue Sapphire Stakes	Caulfield	LR	1200 m	57.5	J. Noske	1:09.76	2nd – Demerit	6.0 x 0.2

2009–10 season as a three-year-old
Result	Date	Race	Venue	Group	Distance	Weight (kg)	Jockey	Time	2nd	Margins
Won	22 August 2009	Crockett Stakes	Moonee Valley	LR	1200 m	56.5	Luke Nolen	1:11.15	2nd – Miraculous Miss	3.0 x 0.1
Won	5 September 2009	Danehill Stakes	Flemington	G2	1200 m	54	L. Nolen	1:09.96	2nd – Wanted	0.8 x 0.5
Won	22 January 2010	Australia Stakes	Moonee Valley	G2	1200 m	53	L. Nolen	1:10.18	2nd – Here De Angels	2.3 x 1.7

2010–11 season as a four-year-old
Result	Date	Race	Venue	Group	Distance	Weight (kg)	Jockey	Time	2nd	Margins
Won	9 October 2010	Schillaci Stakes	Caulfield	G2	1000 m	56.5	L. Nolen	0:56.68	2nd – Winter King	1.3 x 2.2
Won	23 October 2010	Schweppes Stakes	Moonee Valley	G2	1200 m	56.5	L. Nolen	1:11.01	2nd – Hot Danish	5.5 x 0.8
Won	6 November 2010	Patinack Farm Classic	Flemington	G1	1200 m	56.5	Ben Melham	1:07.96	2nd – Star Witness	4.0 x 2.3
Won	19 February 2011	Lightning Stakes	Flemington	G1	1000 m	56.5	L. Nolen	0:57.20	2nd – Hay List	3.3 x 1.7
Won	12 March 2011	Newmarket Handicap	Flemington	G1	1200 m	58	L. Nolen	1:07.36	2nd – Crystal Lily	3.0 x 0.8
Won	25 March 2011	William Reid Stakes	Moonee Valley	G1	1200 m	56.5	L. Nolen	1:10.00	2nd – Crystal Lily	1.8 x 1.2
Won	9 April 2011	T J Smith Stakes	Randwick	G1	1200 m	56.5	L. Nolen	1:08.71	2nd – Hay List	2.8 x 5.0
Won	14 May 2011	BTC Cup	Doomben	G1	1200 m	56.5	L. Nolen	1:08.85	2nd – Hay List	2.0 x 4.8

2011–12 season as a five-year-old
Result	Date	Race	Venue	Group	Distance	Weight (kg)	Jockey	Time	2nd	Margins
Won	8 October 2011	Schillaci Stakes	Caulfield	G2	1000 m	56.5	L. Nolen	0:56.73	2nd – Karuta Queen	4.3 x 0.4
Won	22 October 2011	Schweppes Stakes	Moonee Valley	G2	1200 m	56.5	L. Nolen	1:10.13	2nd – Doubtful Jack	6.0 x 1.3
Won	5 November 2011	Patinack Farm Classic	Flemington	G1	1200 m	56.5	L. Nolen	1:08.03	2nd – Buffering	2.8 x 3.8
Won	27 January 2012	Australia Stakes	Moonee Valley	G2	1200 m	56.5	L. Nolen	1:09.44	2nd – Zedi Knight	4.3 x 4.3
Won	11 February 2012	C F Orr Stakes	Caulfield	G1	1400 m	57	L. Nolen	1:25.14	2nd – Southern Speed	3.3 x 3.8
Won	18 February 2012	Lightning Stakes	Flemington	G1	1000 m	56.5	L. Nolen	0:55.53	2nd – Hay List	1.8 x 3.8
Won	28 April 2012	Robert Sangster Stakes	Morphettville	G1	1200 m	56.5	L. Nolen	1:10.65	2nd – Sistine Angel	4.5 x 0.1
Won	12 May 2012	Goodwood Handicap	Morphettville	G1	1200 m	57	L. Nolen	1:10.32	2nd – We're Gonna Rock	1.3 x 3.0
Won	23 June 2012	Diamond Jubilee Stakes	Ascot, England	G1	1200 m	57	L. Nolen	1:14.10	2nd – Moonlight Cloud	0.1 x 0.5

2012–13 season as a six-year-old
Result	Date	Race	Venue	Group	Distance	Weight (kg)	Jockey	Time	2nd	Margins
Won	16 February 2013	Lightning Stakes	Flemington	G1	1000 m	56.5	L. Nolen	0:55.42	2nd – Moment of Change	2.5 x 5.8
Won	22 March 2013	William Reid Stakes	Moonee Valley	G1	1200 m	56.5	L. Nolen	1:11:08	2nd – Karuta Queen	4.0 x 0.5
Won	13 April 2013	TJ Smith Stakes	Randwick	G1	1200 m	56.5	L. Nolen	1:09.65	2nd – Epaulette	3.0 x 2.3

== Pedigree ==
Pedigree of Black Caviar (AUS) brown mare, (2006)
Sire Bel Esprit (AUS) 1999	Royal Academy (USA); 1987	Nijinsky (CAN); 1967	Northern Dancer* (CAN)
Sire Bel Esprit (AUS) 1999	Royal Academy (USA); 1987	Nijinsky (CAN); 1967	Flaming Page (CAN)
Sire Bel Esprit (AUS) 1999	Royal Academy (USA); 1987	Crimson Saint (USA); 1969	Crimson Satan (USA)
Sire Bel Esprit (AUS) 1999	Royal Academy (USA); 1987	Crimson Saint (USA); 1969	Bolero Rose (USA)
Sire Bel Esprit (AUS) 1999	Bespoken (AUS); 1990	Vain* (AUS); 1966	Wilkes (FR)
Sire Bel Esprit (AUS) 1999	Bespoken (AUS); 1990	Vain* (AUS); 1966	Elated (AUS)
Sire Bel Esprit (AUS) 1999	Bespoken (AUS); 1990	Vin d'Amour (NZ); 1981	Adios (GB)
Sire Bel Esprit (AUS) 1999	Bespoken (AUS); 1990	Vin d'Amour (NZ); 1981	Gliteren (NZ)
Dam Helsinge (AUS) 2001	Desert Sun (GB); 1988	Green Desert (USA); 1983	Danzig* (USA)
Dam Helsinge (AUS) 2001	Desert Sun (GB); 1988	Green Desert (USA); 1983	Foreign Courier (USA)
Dam Helsinge (AUS) 2001	Desert Sun (GB); 1988	Solar (GB); 1973	Hotfoot (GB)
Dam Helsinge (AUS) 2001	Desert Sun (GB); 1988	Solar (GB); 1973	Languissola (GB)
Dam Helsinge (AUS) 2001	Scandinavia (AUS); 1994	Snippets (AUS); 1984	Lunchtime (GB)
Dam Helsinge (AUS) 2001	Scandinavia (AUS); 1994	Snippets (AUS); 1984	Easy Date (AUS)
Dam Helsinge (AUS) 2001	Scandinavia (AUS); 1994	Song of Norway (AUS); 1982	Vain* (AUS)
Dam Helsinge (AUS) 2001	Scandinavia (AUS); 1994	Song of Norway (AUS); 1982	Love Song (Den) (Family: 1-p)

- Black Caviar is inbred 3 × 4 to the stallion Vain, meaning that Vain appears once in the third generation and once in the fourth generation of her pedigree.
- Black Caviar is inbred 4 × 5 to the stallion Northern Dancer, meaning he appears in fourth generation on the sire side and in the fifth generation (via Danzig) on the dam side of her pedigree.

== Death ==
On 17 August 2024, Black Caviar's owners announced that she had died shortly after giving birth, a day before her 18th birthday. She was euthanised to prevent suffering after being diagnosed with laminitis. Her foal did not survive.

== See also ==
- List of leading Thoroughbred racehorses
- List of racehorses
