= Behemoth Stakes =

Spring Stakes
- Class: Group 3
- Location: Morphettville Racecourse, Adelaide, Australia
- Inaugurated: 1970
- Race type: Thoroughbred
- Sponsor: Sportsbet (2025 & 2026)

Race information
- Distance: 1,200 metres
- Surface: Turf
- Track: Left-handed
- Weight: Weight for age
- Purse: $150,000 (2026)

The Behemoth Stakes formerly known as the Spring Stakes and the David R Coles AM Spring Stakes is a South Australian Jockey Club Group 3 Thoroughbred horse race at Weight for age, over a distance of 1200 metres, held annually at Morphettville Racecourse, Adelaide, Australia in August.

== History ==
Prior to 2006 the race was held in September. The event is the first Group race in the new racing calendar in South Australia.

From 2015 to 2020 the race was named in honour of David R Coles who made a significant contribution to thoroughbred racing industry by the former SAJC Chairman, and pre-eminent Bloodstock agent and consultant. Coles was inducted into the South Australian Racing Hall of Fame in 2003 and into the Australian Racing Hall of Fame in 2013.

=== Distance ===
- 1970–1971 - 6 furlongs (~1200 metres)
- 1972–1978 – 1200 metres
- 1979–1980 – 1350 metres (Held at Cheltenham Park Racecourse)
- 1981–2000 – 1200 metres
- 2001 – 1250 metres (Held at Cheltenham Park Racecourse)
- 2002 onwards - 1200 metres

=== Grade ===
- 1970–1978 - Principal Race
- 1979–1997 - Group 2
- 1998 onwards - Group 3

== Winners ==
The following are past winners of the race.

- 2026 - Sir Now
- 2025 - Queman
- 2024 - See You In Heaven
- 2023 - See You In Heaven
- 2022 - Calypso Reign
- 2021 - Behemoth (Note: In 2021 Beau Rossa crossed the finish line first, but was relegated to second place due to interference.)
- 2020 - Behemoth
- 2019 - Dalasan
- 2018 - Dollar For Dollar
- 2017 - Mio Dio
- 2016 - Beirut
- 2015 - Red Eclipse
- 2014 - Riziz
- 2013 - Just Discreet
- 2012 - Happy Trails
- 2011 - Uxorious
- 2010 - Rebel Raider
- 2009 - Midnight Mustang
- 2008 - El Maze
- 2007 - Zupaone
- 2006 - Royal Ida
- 2005 - Super Elegant
- 2004 - Sky Cuddle
- 2003 - Squillani
- 2002 - Strategic Image
- 2001 - Flavour
- 2000 - Spice Doll
- 1999 - Star Joe
- 1998 - Will Fly
- 1997 - Hero Wind
- 1996 - Staaraq
- 1995 - Hero Wind
- 1994 - Hero Wind
- 1993 - Colebrook
- 1992 - Black Rouge
- 1991 - Beau George
- 1990 - Redelva
- 1989 - Redelva
- 1988 - Redelva
- 1987 - Change Of Habit
- 1986 - Romantic Red
- 1985 - Trichelle
- 1984 - Gold Kildare
- 1983 - Belcunda
- 1982 - Oriental Ruler
- 1981 - Bargambler
- 1980 - Rumpus Room
- 1979 - Court Sabre
- 1978 - Pelican Point
- 1977 - Hartbalm
- 1976 - Classic Conquest
- 1975 - Samist
- 1974 - Samist
- 1973 - Toltrice
- 1972 - High Gypsy
- 1971 - Romantic Son
- 1970 - Eastern Court

== See also ==
- The Goodwood
- Proud Miss Stakes
- Robert A. Lee Stakes
- SA Fillies Classic
- List of Australian Group races
- Group races
