= Eclipse Stakes (disambiguation) =

The Eclipse Stakes is a horse race in Great Britain.

Eclipse Stakes may also refer to:

- Eclipse Stakes (MRC), a Melbourne Racing Club horse race in Australia
- Eclipse Stakes (Canada), a horse race in Canada
- Eclipse Stakes (Morris Park), a Thoroughbred horse race in the United States
- Eclipse (greyhounds), a greyhound race in Great Britain
