= Spring Stakes =

Spring Stakes may refer to:

- SAJC Spring Stakes, Morphettville Racecourse, Adelaide, Australia
- Spring Stakes (Japan), Nakayama Racecourse
- Spring Stakes (NJC), Broadmeadow Racecourse, Newcastle, New South Wales, Australia
