= National Stakes (disambiguation) =

The Vincent O'Brien National Stakes is a horse race at The Curragh racecourse in Ireland.

National Stakes may also refer to the following horse races:

- National Stakes (SAJC), at Morphettville Racecourse in Australia
- National Stakes (Sandown Park), at Sandown Park in England

== See also ==
- National Produce Stakes, an Irish greyhound race
