= Behemoth (horse) =

Australian thoroughbred racehorse

- Sire: All Too Hard
- Grandsire: Casino Prince
- Dam: Penny Banger
- Damsire: Zedrich
- Sex: Gelding
- Foaled: 2015
- Country: Australia
- Colour: Bay
- Breeder: Wallings Bloodstock
- Owner: Grand Syndicates et al.
- Trainer: David Jolly
- Record: 32: 10-5-1
- Earnings: A$3,291,055

Major wins
- D. C. McKay Stakes (2020); Spring Stakes (2020, 2021); Memsie Stakes (2020, 2021); Sir Rupert Clarke Stakes (2020)

Honours
- Behemoth Stakes

Behemoth (foaled 2015) is a multiple Group 1 winning Australian bred thoroughbred racehorse.

== Background ==
Behemoth was initially sold at the 2016 Inglis Great Southern Weanling Sale for A$120,000.

At the 2017 Magic Millions National Yearling Sale, Behemoth was purchased by his current owners, Grand Syndicates for just $6,000.

== Racing career ==
=== 2017/18: two-year-old season ===
Behemoth made his race debut at Balaklava on the 20 June 2018, where he finished in fifth position. He had one more start as a two-year-old finishing second at Gawler.

=== 2018/19: three-year-old season ===
On 6 November 2018, Behemoth won his first race when resuming as a three-year-old at Morphettville.

Three weeks later, he was successful again when winning comfortably at Moonee Valley. During this race, Behemoth was supported in the betting from $5 into a $3.50 favourite. He sat back in the six-horse field but worked into the race before the turn and sprinted clear to win by a margin of 3.5 lengths. Trainer David Jolly said after the race, “He still doesn't quite know what he's doing yet, that's the great thing about him, there's a lot of upside.”

On 18 May 2019, Behemoth contested his first Group 1 race in The Goodwood at Morphettville. Despite it being only his seventh career start, Behemoth charged home late to run into second place, beaten only by a narrow margin.

=== 2019/20: four-year-old season ===
On 31 August 2019, Behemoth won the Listed Penny Edition Stakes at Morphettville Parks.

His only other win as a four-year-old was on the 2 May 2020, in the D. C. McKay Stakes at Morphettville. Although finishing second on race day behind veteran galloper Jungle Edge, some months later Jungle Edge was disqualified from the race after a prohibited substance was found in his system. Behemoth was promoted to first position.

=== 2020/21: five-year-old season ===
On 15 August 2020, Behemoth won the Spring Stakes at Morphettville.

On the 29 August 2020, Behemoth started the $3.30 favourite in the Group 1 Memsie Stakes at Caulfield. Given a positive ride by Craig Williams, Behemoth gave nothing else a chance in recording a dominant one and a half length win over the Queensland Derby winner Mr Quickie. It was the first Group 1 in 18 years for Behemoth's trainer David Jolly, and the 60th for jockey Williams.

Three weeks later, Behemoth made it back-to-back Group 1 victories in the Sir Rupert Clarke Stakes at Caulfield when carrying top-weight of 60kg.

Behemoth was then selected to run in The Everest at Randwick, where he finished in 10th position behind Classique Legend.

Behemoth won his next start on 30 January 2021 in the Durbridge Stakes.

=== 2021/22: six-year-old season ===
Behemoth was second past the post in the 2021 Spring Stakes beaten a nose margin, however was awarded the race on protest, after suffering interference from Beau Rossa 150 metres out from the winning post.

On the 28 August 2021, Behemoth became the first horse since Sunline in 2001, to win back-to-back Memsie Stakes. Ridden by Brett Prebble, he defeated Beau Rossa with Tofane running in third position.

=== 2021/22: six-year-old season ===
The 2021 Memsie Stakes would prove to be Behemoth's final victory. He had three runs as a six-year-old, finishing unplaced in all three. His final race start was a seventh placing in the 2022 Manikato Stakes, when trainer Richard Jolly announced, "We wanted to call it, sometimes these horses can go around too long, I think that was a respectable run, let's go out on that one."

Behemoth was retired to Living Legends, a property for retired champion racehorses.

== Pedigree ==
Pedigree of Behemoth (AUS) 2015
Sire All Too Hard (AUS) 2009	Casino Prince (AUS); 2003	Flying Spur	Danehill
Sire All Too Hard (AUS) 2009	Casino Prince (AUS); 2003	Flying Spur	Rolls
Sire All Too Hard (AUS) 2009	Casino Prince (AUS); 2003	Lady Capel	Last Tycoon
Sire All Too Hard (AUS) 2009	Casino Prince (AUS); 2003	Lady Capel	Kew Gardens
Sire All Too Hard (AUS) 2009	Helsinge (AUS); 2001	Desert Sun	Green Desert
Sire All Too Hard (AUS) 2009	Helsinge (AUS); 2001	Desert Sun	Solar
Sire All Too Hard (AUS) 2009	Helsinge (AUS); 2001	Scandinavia	Snippets
Sire All Too Hard (AUS) 2009	Helsinge (AUS); 2001	Scandinavia	Song Of Norway
Dam Penny Banger (AUS) 2005	Zedrich (AUS); 1992	Zeditave	The Judge
Dam Penny Banger (AUS) 2005	Zedrich (AUS); 1992	Zeditave	Summoned
Dam Penny Banger (AUS) 2005	Zedrich (AUS); 1992	Rich Haul	Haulpak
Dam Penny Banger (AUS) 2005	Zedrich (AUS); 1992	Rich Haul	Born Rich
Dam Penny Banger (AUS) 2005	Miss Firecracker (AUS); 1990	Twig Ruler	Twig Moss
Dam Penny Banger (AUS) 2005	Miss Firecracker (AUS); 1990	Twig Ruler	Irish Peace
Dam Penny Banger (AUS) 2005	Miss Firecracker (AUS); 1990	Cheysing	Cheyne Walk
Dam Penny Banger (AUS) 2005	Miss Firecracker (AUS); 1990	Cheysing	Singspiel
