= Lord (horse) =

New Zealand-bred Thoroughbred racehorse

- Sire: Targui (France)
- Grandsire: Djebel
- Dam: Broadway (Australia)
- Damsire: Actor (France)
- Sex: Gelding
- Foaled: 1954
- Country: New Zealand
- Colour: Bay
- Owner: W. Kemball
- Trainer: Ken Hilton
- Record: 80 starts (28-13-11)
- Earnings: A£59,364

Major wins
- J J Liston Stakes (1958); Memsie Stakes (1958, 1959, 1960, 1961); Underwood Stakes (1958); Caulfield Stakes (1958, 1959, 1960); C F Orr Stakes (1959, 1960); St George Stakes (1959, 1960); Futurity Stakes (1959); All Aged Stakes (1959); Underwood Stakes (1960); VRC Queens Plate (1961, 1962); Craiglee Stakes (1961)
- Last updated on 24 June 2011

Lord (foaled 1954) was a New Zealand-born Thoroughbred racehorse who raced successfully in Australia.

== Background ==
He was a bay gelding by Targui (FR) out of Broadway (AUS), by Actor (FR).

== Racing career ==
Lord is remembered for his 1960 Victoria Racing Club Queen's Plate effort in which he nearly defeated the champion Tulloch, who was returning after two years' absence due to illness. He usually competed in weight for age contests and all but one of his 28 successes were in Melbourne, 21 of them at his home track of Caulfield; this earned him the nickname "King of Caulfield". Among his major wins were the VATC Caulfield Stakes (three times), VATC Memsie Stakes (four times) and the AJC All Aged Stakes.

Lord raced until he was a nine-year-old, often competing against quality opposition such as Tulloch, Todman, Sky High and Aquanita. He was ridden in many of his wins by top apprentice (later leading jockey) Geoff Lane, who knew the big gelding's habits and ability. He never ran in a Cox Plate, since he was unable to handle the smaller Moonee Valley track due to his long-striding action.

== Retirement ==
Following his retirement from racing, Lord was a noted show-jumper. He died in 1986 at the advanced age of 32.

== See also ==
- Repeat winners of horse races
