= Aurie's Star Handicap =

- Class: Group 3
- Location: Flemington Racecourse
- Inaugurated: 1996
- Race type: Thoroughbred

Race information
- Distance: 1,200 metres
- Surface: Turf
- Track: Straight
- Qualification: Maidens ineligible
- Weight: Handicap
- Purse: $200,000 (2026)

The Aurie's Star Handicap is a Victoria Racing Club Group 3 horse race held under open handicap conditions, for horses aged three years old and upwards, over a distance of 1200 metres, held annually at Flemington Racecourse in Melbourne, Australia in August.

== History ==
The event is the first Group race in the new racing calendar in Victoria.

The race is named in honour of Auries's Star, a gelding who won 28 of his 89 starts, including the 1937 Newmarket Handicap, the 1937 and 1939 Oakleigh Plate as well as the 1940 Goodwood Handicap.

=== Grade ===
- 1996–2004 - Unlisted handicap
- 2005–2009 - Listed Race
- 2010 onwards - Group 3

=== Venue ===
- 1996–2006: Flemington Racecourse
- 2007: Moonee Valley Racecourse
- 2008 onwards: Flemington Racecourse

== Winners ==
The following are past winners of the race.

- 2026 - Boomtown Boss
- 2025 - King Of Roseau
- 2024 - Right To Party
- 2023 - It'sourtime
- 2022 - Sirius Suspect
- 2021 - The Astrologist
- 2020 - Home Of The Brave
- 2019 - So Si Bon
- 2018 - Voodoo Lad
- 2017 - Hey Doc
- 2016 - Sooboog
- 2015 - Shiraz
- 2014 - Tiger Tees
- 2013 - Broken
- 2012 - Shanghai Warrior
- 2011 - Temple Of Boom
- 2010 - Elusive Touch
- 2009 - Mic Mac
- 2008 - Grand Duels
- 2007 - Monet Rules
- 2006 - Bel Danoro
- 2005 - Niconero
- 2004 - General Bayton
- 2003 - Sports
- 2002 - Fields Of Omagh
- 2001 - Sound The Alarm
- 2000 - Roktzar
- 1999 - Hula Wonder
- 1998 - Source of Divorce
- 1997 - Penghulu
- 1996 - Homestead

== See also ==
- List of Australian Group races
- Group races
