= Fields of Omagh =

Australian-bred Thoroughbred racehorse (1997–2023)

- Sire: Rubiton
- Grandsire: Century
- Dam: Finneto
- Damsire: Cerreto (IRE)
- Sex: Gelding
- Foaled: 22 September 1997
- Died: 8 June 2023 (aged 25)
- Country: Australia
- Colour: Bay
- Breeder: Martin O'Connor
- Owner: Martin O'Connor (managing partner for No Big Deal syndicate), A Cork, A Sorrell & E J LeGrand
- Trainer: Peter Hayes; Tony McEvoy; David A. Hayes
- Record: 45: 13-8-7
- Earnings: $6,496,240

Major wins
- Eclipse Stakes (2001); Aurie's Star Handicap (2002); John F. Feehan Stakes (2002); W S Cox Plate (2003, 2006); Futurity Stakes (2006)
- Last updated on 9 June 2023

Fields of Omagh (22 September 1997 – 8 June 2023), also known as FOO, was an Australian champion middle distance Thoroughbred racehorse of the early-mid-2000s. He was a half-brother to the stakeswinners, King Brian (Bunbury Cup, Pinjarra Cup), Malcolm (STC Canterbury Stakes, Ajax Stakes and Yallambee Stud Stakes) and Timeless Grace (VATC WW Cockram Stakes).

Fields of Omagh was trained at Lindsay Park, South Australia by Peter Hayes, Tony McEvoy and David Hayes. "FOO", as he was affectionately dubbed by fans and the media, won seven races in succession in the early part of his career. Nursed back from two serious injuries by Campbell Baker, head veterinary surgeon for Lindsay Park, the horse gained a reputation as a Moonee Valley specialist. He was also noted for his gallant runners-up behind Northerly in the 2002 Caulfield Cup. He won the Valley's prestigious Cox Plate for the first time in 2003, and, in a record-equalling fifth attempt, created history in becoming the race's oldest winner, as a nine-year-old, in 2006. In between these wins, he was second to Savabeel, and third behind Makybe Diva. FOO also won the 2006 Group One Futurity Stakes. FOO campaigned at or near the highest level for six years in a row and raced against a number of champions including Makybe Diva, Sunline, Northerly, Lonhro and El Segundo.

During his racing career he travelled to Japan, Hong Kong and the United Arab Emirates.

Fields of Omagh was retired after his second Cox Plate win, and then resided at Living Legends, the International Home of Rest for Champion Horses located in Woodlands Historic Park, Greenvale, Victoria, Australia.

A book on the life of Fields of Omagh and his 18 owners was published in September 2007.

Fields of Omagh died on 8 June 2023, at the age of 25.

== Race record ==
2000–01 season as a three-year-old
Result	Date	Race	Venue	Group	Distance	Weight (kg)	Jockey	Winner/2nd
4th	27 August 2000	3yo Hcp Restricted	Bendigo	NA	1300 m	56.5	S. Baster	1st – Ming's Finale
3rd	12 September 2000	3yo Hcp Restricted	Ballarat	NA	1400 m	54.5	S. Baster	1st – Bold Laird
10th	23 September 2000	3yo Hcp Restricted	Geelong	NA	1535 m	52	G. Hoobin	1st – Zephyr Breeze
3rd	31 January 2001	3yo Hcp Restricted	Ballarat	NA	1200 m	56.5	K. McEvoy	1st – King of Roses
2nd	17 February 2001	3yo Hcp Restricted	Bendigo	NA	1400 m	56.5	L. Beer	1st – Dual Action
Won	4 March 2001	3yo Hcp Restricted	Sandown	NA	1400 m	52	G. Childs	2nd – Flash Line
4th	16 April 2001	3yo Hcp Restricted	Caulfield	NA	1400 m	52.5	G. Childs	1st – De Gaulle Lane
Won	9 May 2001	3yo Hcp Restricted	Sandown	NA	1400 m	55.5	D. Gauci	2nd – Mr Magistrate

2001–02 season as a four-year-old
Result	Date	Race	Venue	Group	Distance	Weight (kg)	Jockey	Winner/2nd
Won	14 September 2001	No Age Hcp Restricted	Kyneton	NA	1200 m	54	G. Childs	2nd – Mighty Amber
Won	13 October 2001	No Age Hcp Restricted	Cheltenham	NA	1350 m	52	S. Price	2nd – All Cheer
Won	20 October 2001	Thomas Elder Stakes	Victoria Park	LR	1600 m	52.5	S. Price	2nd – Moet Now
Won	6 November 2001	Hong Kong Jockey Club Plate	Flemington	LR	1800 m	53	G. Childs	2nd – Thong Classic
Won	24 November 2001	Eclipse Stakes	Sandown	G3	2119 m	55.5	G. Childs	2nd – Thong Classic

2002–03 season as a five-year-old
Result	Date	Race	Venue	Group	Distance	Weight (kg)	Jockey	Winner/2nd
Won	11 August 2002	Aurie's Star Handicap	Flemington	NA	1200 m	58.5	G. Childs	2nd – Pindi Ridge
2nd	31 August 2002	Memsie Stakes	Caulfield	G2	1410 m	58	G. Childs	1st – Magical Miss
Won	14 September 2002	Feehan Stakes	Moonee Valley	G2	1600 m	58	D. Oliver	2nd – Magical Miss
3rd	5 October 2002	Turnbull Stakes	Flemington	G2	2000 m	59	D. Oliver	1st – Northerly
2nd	19 October 2002	Caulfield Cup	Caulfield	G1	2400 m	53.5	D. Oliver	1st – Northerly
5th	26 October 2002	Cox Plate	Moonee Valley	G1	2040 m	58	D. Oliver	1st – Northerly
2nd	8 February 2003	C F Orr Stakes	Caulfield	G1	1400 m	58	G. Childs	1st – Yell
2nd	22 February 2003	St George Stakes	Caulfield	G2	1800 m	58	G. Childs	1st – Northerly
5th	10 March 2003	Australian Cup	Flemington	G1	2000 m	58	G. Childs	1st – Northerly

2003–04 season as a six-year-old
Result	Date	Race	Venue	Group	Distance	Weight (kg)	Jockey	Winner/2nd
18th	21 September 2003	Dubai Club Cup	Caulfield	G1	1400 m	57	K. McEvoy	1st – Exceed and Excel
2nd	11 October 2003	Toorak Handicap	Caulfield	G1	1600 m	57	S. King	1st – Roman Arch
Won	25 October 2003	Cox Plate	Moonee Valley	G1	2040 m	58	S. King	2nd – Defier
3rd	1 November 2003	Mackinnon Stakes	Flemington	G1	2000 m	58	S. King	1st – Casual Pass
18th	30 November 2003	Japan Cup	Tokyo	G1	2400 m	57	S. King	1st – Tap Dance City
11th	14 December 2003	Hong Kong Vase	Sha Tin	G1	2400 m	57	S. King	1st – Vallee Enchantee

2004–05 season as a seven-year-old
Result	Date	Race	Venue	Group	Distance	Weight (kg)	Jockey	Winner/2nd
5th	28 August 2004	Memsie Stakes	Caulfield	G2	1400 m	58	V. Hall	1st – Regal Roller
4th	11 September 2004	Feehan Stakes	Moonee Valley	G2	1600 m	58	G. Childs	1st – Delzao
Won	2 October 2004	Penny Edition Stakes	Victoria Park	LR	1450 m	58	S. Price	2nd – Fairessa
2nd	23 October 2004	Cox Plate	Moonee Valley	G1	2040 m	58	D. Nikolic	1st – Savabeel
12th	12 December 2004	Hong Kong Cup	Sha Tin	G1	2000 m	57	D. Nikolic	1st – Alexander Goldrun

2005–06 season as an eight-year-old
Result	Date	Race	Venue	Group	Distance	Weight (kg)	Jockey	Winner/2nd
7th	20 August 2005	Liston Stakes	Caulfield	G2	1400 m	58	S. King	1st – Lad of the Manor
3rd	10 September 2005	Feehan Stakes	Moonee Valley	G2	1600 m	58	S. King	1st – Lad of the Manor
2nd	8 October 2005	Caulfield Stakes	Caulfield	G1	2000 m	58	S. King	1st – El Segundo
3rd	22 October 2005	Cox Plate	Moonee Valley	G1	2040 m	58	S. King	1st – Makybe Diva
8th	29 October 2005	Mackinnon Stakes	Flemington	G1	2000 m	58	S. King	1st – Lad of the Manor
3rd	11 February 2006	C F Orr Stakes	Caulfield	G1	1400 m	58	S. King	1st – Perfect Promise
Won	4 March 2006	Futurity Stakes	Caulfield	G1	1600 m	58	S. King	2nd – Red Dazzler
7th	25 March 2006	Dubai Duty Free Stakes	Nad Al Sheba	G1	1800 m	57	S. King	1st – David Junior

2006–07 season as a nine-year-old
Result	Date	Race	Venue	Group	Distance	Weight (kg)	Jockey	Winner/2nd
10th	2 September 2006	Memsie Stakes	Caulfield	G2	1400 m	58	C. Williams	1st – El Segundo
5th	16 September 2006	Feehan Stakes	Moonee Valley	G2	1600 m	58	S. King	1st – Lad of the Manor
4th	14 October 2006	Caulfield Stakes	Caulfield	G1	2000 m	58	C. Williams	1st – Casual Pass
Won	28 October 2006	Cox Plate	Moonee Valley	G1	2040 m	58	C. Williams	2nd – El Segundo

== Pedigree ==
Pedigree of Fields of Omagh (Aus)
Sire Rubiton (Aus) 1983	Century (Aus); 1969	Better Boy (Ire); 1951	My Babu (Fr)
Sire Rubiton (Aus) 1983	Century (Aus); 1969	Better Boy (Ire); 1951	Better So (GB)
Sire Rubiton (Aus) 1983	Century (Aus); 1969	Royal Suite (Aus); 1960	Rego (Ire)
Sire Rubiton (Aus) 1983	Century (Aus); 1969	Royal Suite (Aus); 1960	Baraganda (Aus)
Sire Rubiton (Aus) 1983	Ruby (Aus); 1977	Seventh Hussar (Fr); 1966	Queen's Hussar (GB)
Sire Rubiton (Aus) 1983	Ruby (Aus); 1977	Seventh Hussar (Fr); 1966	Ann Boleyn (GB)
Sire Rubiton (Aus) 1983	Ruby (Aus); 1977	Briars Toddy (Aus); 1971	Todman (Aus)
Sire Rubiton (Aus) 1983	Ruby (Aus); 1977	Briars Toddy (Aus); 1971	St Auriga (Aus)
Dam Finneto (Aus) 1981	Cerreto (Ire); 1970	Claude (Ity); 1964	Hornbeam (GB)
Dam Finneto (Aus) 1981	Cerreto (Ire); 1970	Claude (Ity); 1964	Aigue-Vive (Fr)
Dam Finneto (Aus) 1981	Cerreto (Ire); 1970	Crenelle (GB); 1960	Crepello (GB)
Dam Finneto (Aus) 1981	Cerreto (Ire); 1970	Crenelle (GB); 1960	Mulberry Harbour (GB)
Dam Finneto (Aus) 1981	Fold (Aus); 1966	Lupus (GB); 1961	Hugh Lupus (Fr)
Dam Finneto (Aus) 1981	Fold (Aus); 1966	Lupus (GB); 1961	Monarchia (GB)
Dam Finneto (Aus) 1981	Fold (Aus); 1966	Shady Lea (Aus); 1958	Meadow Mist (GB)
Dam Finneto (Aus) 1981	Fold (Aus); 1966	Shady Lea (Aus); 1958	Amnesia (Aus)
