= Redelva =

Australian-bred Thoroughbred racehorse

- Sire: Romantic Hope
- Grandsire: Johns Hope
- Dam: Delvena
- Damsire: Sunny Coronation
- Sex: Gelding
- Foaled: 1950
- Country: New Zealand
- Colour: Chestnut
- Breeder: W. C. Walter
- Trainer: Greg Varcoe
- Record: 61:21-13-5
- Earnings: $1,791,710

Major wins
- SAJC R. N. Irwin Stakes (1988); VRC Rupert Steele Stakes (1988); VRC Standish Handicap (1988); MVRC Stanley Wootton Stakes (1990); VRC Lightning Stakes (1990); VRC Linlithgow Stakes (1988, 1990); SAJC Spring Stakes (1988, 1989, 1990); VATC Rubiton Stakes (1991); MVRC William Reid Stakes (1991); VATC Futurity Stakes (1991); VATC Memsie Stakes (1991)

Redelva was a notable Australian thoroughbred racehorse.

A chestnut son of Romantic Hope from the mare Delvena, he was foaled in 1983 and was trained throughout his career by Greg Varcoe.

Redelva competed primarily in sprint races winning up to a distance of 1400m. He was a durable horse winning established races at the highest level as a two-year-old right through to the age of eight.

Amongst his major wins were the 1990 VRC Lightning Stakes, 1991 MVRC William Reid Stakes and the SAJC Spring Stakes on three occasions (1988–90). Redelva was primarily ridden throughout his career by Neville "Nifty" Wilson

== See also ==
- Repeat winners of horse races
