= David Coles AM Stakes =

Horse race in Adelaide, South Australia

- Class: Group 3
- Location: Morphettville Racecourse, South Australia
- Inaugurated: 1985
- Race type: Thoroughbred
- Sponsor: Sportsbet (2025)

Race information
- Distance: 1,200 metres
- Surface: Turf
- Track: Left-handed
- Qualification: Two-year-olds
- Weight: Set weights with penalties
- Purse: $150,000 (2025)

The David Coles AM Stakes, registered as the National Stakes is a South Australian Jockey Club Group 3 Thoroughbred horse race for horses aged two years old, at set weights with penalties, over a distance of 1200 metres, held annually at Morphettville Racecourse in Adelaide, Australia during the Autumn Carnival.

The race is named after David Coles, long-time horse auctioneer in South Australia and head of the bloodstock sales company Coles Brothers. Coles was also a Chairman and Life Member of the South Australian Jockey Club.

From 2014 to 2019 Morphettville also hosted a Group 3 race known as the David R Coles AM Spring Stakes in August, that race is now known as the Behemoth Stakes.

== History ==
=== Name ===
- 1985–1993 - National Stakes
- 1994–1998 - SGIC Stakes
- 1999 - Stillwell Stakes
- 2000 - National Stakes
- 2001–2012 - The Jansz
- 2013–2020 - National Stakes
- 2021 onwards - David Coles AM Stakes

=== Grade ===
- 1985–1986 - Listed Race
- 1987 onwards - Group 3

=== Records ===
The race record time for running of the 1200 metres is held by Triple Asset in a time of 1:10.11 in 2011.

Most wins by a trainer - 3 times:

- Colin S. Hayes - 1987, 1989, 1990
- Leon Macdonald - 1996, 2009, 2012

== Winners ==
The following are past winners of the race.

- 2026 - Brave Hustler
- 2025 - Steel Trap
- 2024 - Flyer
- 2023 - Heuristic
- 2022 - Maximillius
- 2021 - Heresy
- 2020 - Extra Time
- 2019 - Li'l Kontra
- 2018 - Marcel From Madrid
- 2017 - I'll Have A Bit
- 2016 - I Am A Star
- 2015 - Prince Of Brooklyn
- 2014 - Moonovermanhattan
- 2013 - Vivi Veloce
- 2012 - Dinkum Diamond
- 2011 - Triple Asset
- 2010 - Toorak Toff
- 2009 - Majestic Music
- 2008 - Viennese
- 2007 - Gabbidon
- 2006 - Lectrice
- 2005 - Tonz More Fun
- 2004 - General’s Dynasty
- 2003 - Great Is Great
- 2002 - Rohatyn
- 2001 - Cable
- 2000 - Super Elegant
- 1999 - Spargo
- 1998 - Gold Crystal
- 1997 - La Baraka
- 1996 - Will Fly
- 1995 - Embargo
- 1994 - Linbird
- 1993 - Harkaway
- 1992 - Mookta
- 1991 - Jakpil
- 1990 - Sushi Rocket
- 1989 - Dancer’s Choice
- 1988 - Pride Of Ingenue
- 1987 - Kaapstad
- 1986 - Bataan
- 1985 - Seiger

== See also ==
- The Goodwood
- Proud Miss Stakes
- Robert A. Lee Stakes
- SA Fillies Classic
- List of Australian Group races
- Group races
