= The Cummings Stakes =

- Class: Group 3
- Location: Morphettville Racecourse, Adelaide, Australia
- Inaugurated: 1979
- Race type: Thoroughbred
- Sponsor: Hahn Brewery (2024-26)

Race information
- Distance: 1,600 metres
- Surface: Turf
- Track: Left-handed
- Qualification: Horses three years old and older
- Weight: Set weights with penalties
- Purse: $220,000 (2026)

The Cummings Stakes registered as the R A Lee Stakes or Robert A. Lee Stakes is a South Australian Jockey Club Group 3 Thoroughbred horse race for horses aged three years old and over, with set weights with penalties, run over a distance of 1600 metres at Morphettville Racecourse in Adelaide, Australia during the SAJC Autumn Carnival.

== History ==
The inaugural running of the race in 1979 was held at Victoria Park Racecourse. The R A Lee Stakes was named in honour of South Australian Thoroughbred Racing Hall of Fame inductee Robert A. Lee (2011).

Prior to 2006 the race was run on the Adelaide Cup race day when the race was held in May. When that race was moved to March this race was moved to Goodwood Handicap race card.

=== Grade ===
- 1979–2005 - Listed Race
- 2006 onwards - Group 3

=== Name ===
- 1979–1997 - Robert A. Lee Stakes
- 1998 - Pope Packaging Stakes
- 1999 - Dr. Lewinn's Stakes
- 2000 - Stuart Crystal Handicap
- 2001 - Pope Packaging Trophy
- 2002–2005 - Pope Packaging Stakes
- 2006–2009 - Gerard Corporation Stakes
- 2010 - Alan Scott Stakes
- 2011–2023 - Robert A. Lee Stakes or R A Lee Stakes
- 2024 onwards - The Cummings Stakes

== Winners ==
The following are past winners of the race.

- 2026 - Arran Bay
- 2025 - Regal Azmon
- 2024 - En Francais
- 2023 - Foxy Frida
- 2022 - Belle Plaisir
- 2021 - Lord Vladivostok
- 2020 - Chapel City
- 2019 - Fastnet Tempest
- 2018 - Land Of Plenty
- 2017 - Burning Front
- 2016 - Tonopah
- 2015 - The Bowler
- 2014 - Rhythm To Spare
- 2013 - Linton
- 2012 - Linton
- 2011 - Budriguez
- 2010 - Majestic Music
- 2009 - Serious Speed
- 2008 - Autumn Jeuney
- 2007 - Brockman’s Lass
- 2006 - Life’s A Bounty
- 2005 - Sassbee
- 2004 - Fly For Me
- 2003 - Sylvaner
- 2002 - Sylvaner
- 2001 - Typhoon Barney
- 2000 - More Action
- 1999 - More Action
- 1998 - Ben's Rocket
- 1997 - Bacy's Brother
- 1996 - Jadeva Belle
- 1995 - Ruling Knight
- 1994 - Master Tambo
- 1993 - Leggings
- 1992 - Pay The Kings
- 1991 - Pacific
- 1990 - Neja
- 1989 - Blast The Glass
- 1988 - Blast The Glass
- 1987 - Regal For Me
- 1986 - Knight Of Avon
- 1985 - Mrs. Fitzherbet
- 1984 - Royal Balladeer
- 1983 - Writ 'N' Wonder
- 1982 - Find The Gold
- 1981 - Welkin Light
- 1980 - Flanders Fields
- 1979 - Lavadina

== See also ==
- David Coles AM Stakes (National Stakes)
- The Goodwood
- Proud Miss Stakes
- SA Fillies Classic
- List of Australian Group races
- Group races
