= Vietnamese-American Vocational Training College =

College in Ho Chi Minh City, Vietnam

Vietnamese-American Vocational Training College or "VATC", now known as American Polytechnic College is a private vocational college in Ho Chi Minh City, Vietnam, and licensed and regulated by the Ministry of Labor, War Invalids, and Social Affairs (MOLISA) of Vietnam. It was established in 1997 as an English-language training center, but became licensed to offer vocational college degrees in 2006. In 2012, VACT changed its name to American Polytechnic College - APC.

American Polytechnic College - APC uses the work-based - learning method to help students get on well with the real working environment in the future. Classroom style teaching in APC combined with project work and practical, work-related activities help to develop students' behavioural skills, which can include teamwork, creative thinking and presentation skills. In addition, the students can choose the BTEC Program, which is school leaving qualification and vocational qualification taken in England, Wales and Northern Ireland. Students study BTEC program in two languages: Vietnamese and English.

With a rapidly growing student body, APC is now the first fully functional American community college in Vietnam. http://caodangvietmy.edu.vn
