= Eclipse Stakes (MRC) =

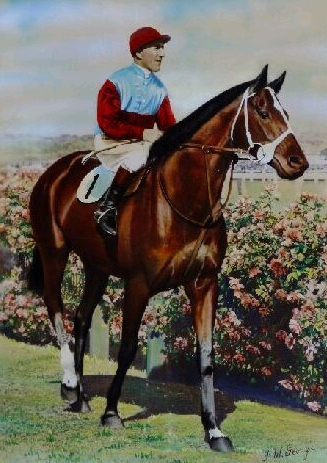
- Lucrative, 1941 winner
- Class: Group 3
- Location: Sandown Racecourse, Melbourne, Australia
- Inaugurated: 1937
- Race type: Thoroughbred
- Sponsor: Henley Homes (2025)

Race information
- Distance: 1,800 metres
- Surface: Turf
- Track: Left-handed
- Qualification: Maidens ineligible
- Weight: Quality handicap
- Purse: $200,000 (2025)

The Eclipse Stakes is a Melbourne Racing Club Group 3 Thoroughbred horse race held under quality handicap conditions, for horses aged three years old and upwards, over a distance of 1800 metres, run at Sandown Racecourse, Melbourne, Australia in mid November.

== History ==
The race was not held for 2 years during World War II. The Melbourne Racing Club moved the race predominantly to Sandown in 1994. However at times the race has been rescheduled and held at Caulfield as was the case in 2013 when Sandown Racecourse was under construction. When held at Sandown Racecourse, the race has been scheduled on the inner Lakeside racecourse at times.

Since 2021, the race has been run at Caulfield Racecourse.

=== Grade ===
- 1937–1978 - Principal race
- 1979–1995 - Listed race
- 1996 onwards - Group 3

=== Venue ===
- 1937–1993 - Caulfield Racecourse
- 1994–1996 - Sandown Racecourse
- 1997 - Caulfield Racecourse
- 1998–2001 - Sandown Racecourse
- 2002–2003 - Caulfield Racecourse
- 2004–2012 - Sandown Racecourse
- 2013 - Caulfield Racecourse
- 2014–2020 - Sandown Racecourse
- 2021–present - Caulfield Racecourse

=== Distance ===
- 1937–1939 - 1 3/8 miles (~2200 metres)
- 1940 - 1 1/4 miles (~2000 metres)
- 1941 - 1 1/2 miles (~2400 metres)
- 1944 - 1 3/8 miles (~2200 metres)
- 1945–1952 - 1 1/2 miles (~2400 metres)
- 1953–1972 - 1 1/4 miles (~2000 metres)
- 1973–1993 - 2000 metres
- 1994–1996 - 2128 metres
- 1997 - 2000 metres
- 1998 - 2128 metres
- 1999–2001 - 2119 metres
- 2002–2003 - 2020 metres
- 2004 - 1800 metres
- 2005 - 2100 metres
- 2006–2007 - 1800 metres
- 2008 - 2100 metres
- 2009 onwards - 1800 metres

=== 1944 racebook ===
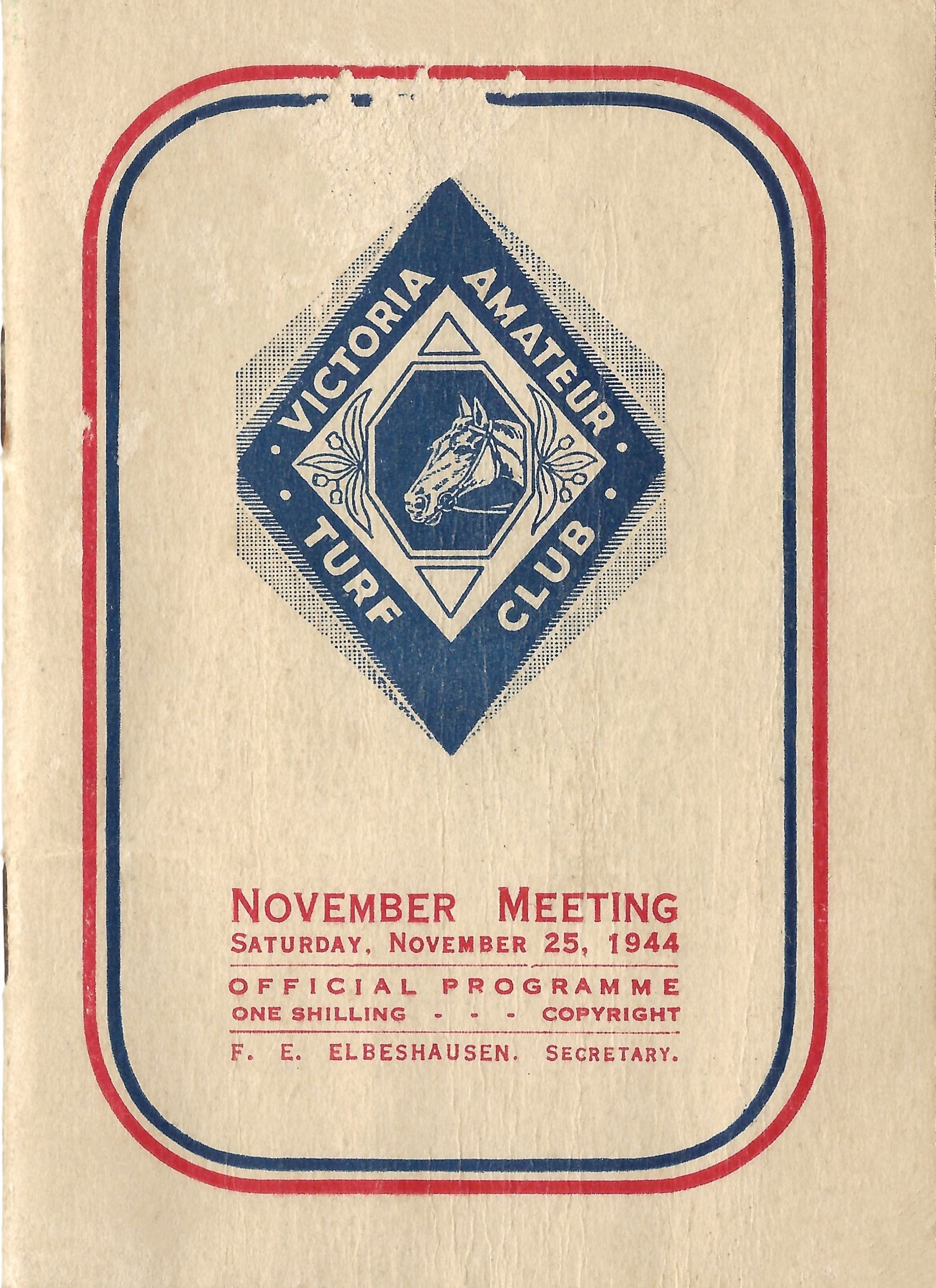
1944 VATC Eclipse Stakes racebook front cover

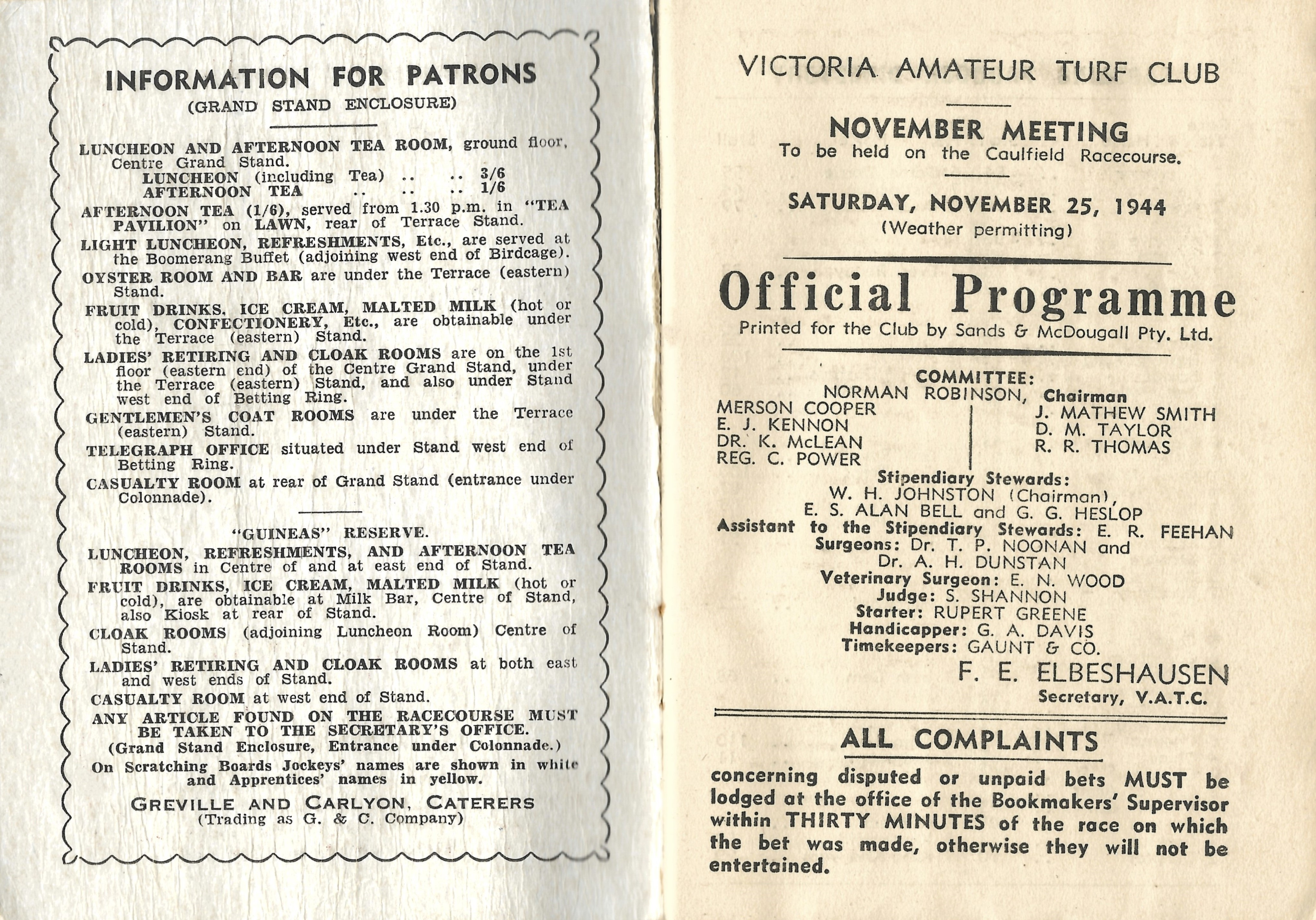
1944 VATC Eclipse Stakes raceday officials

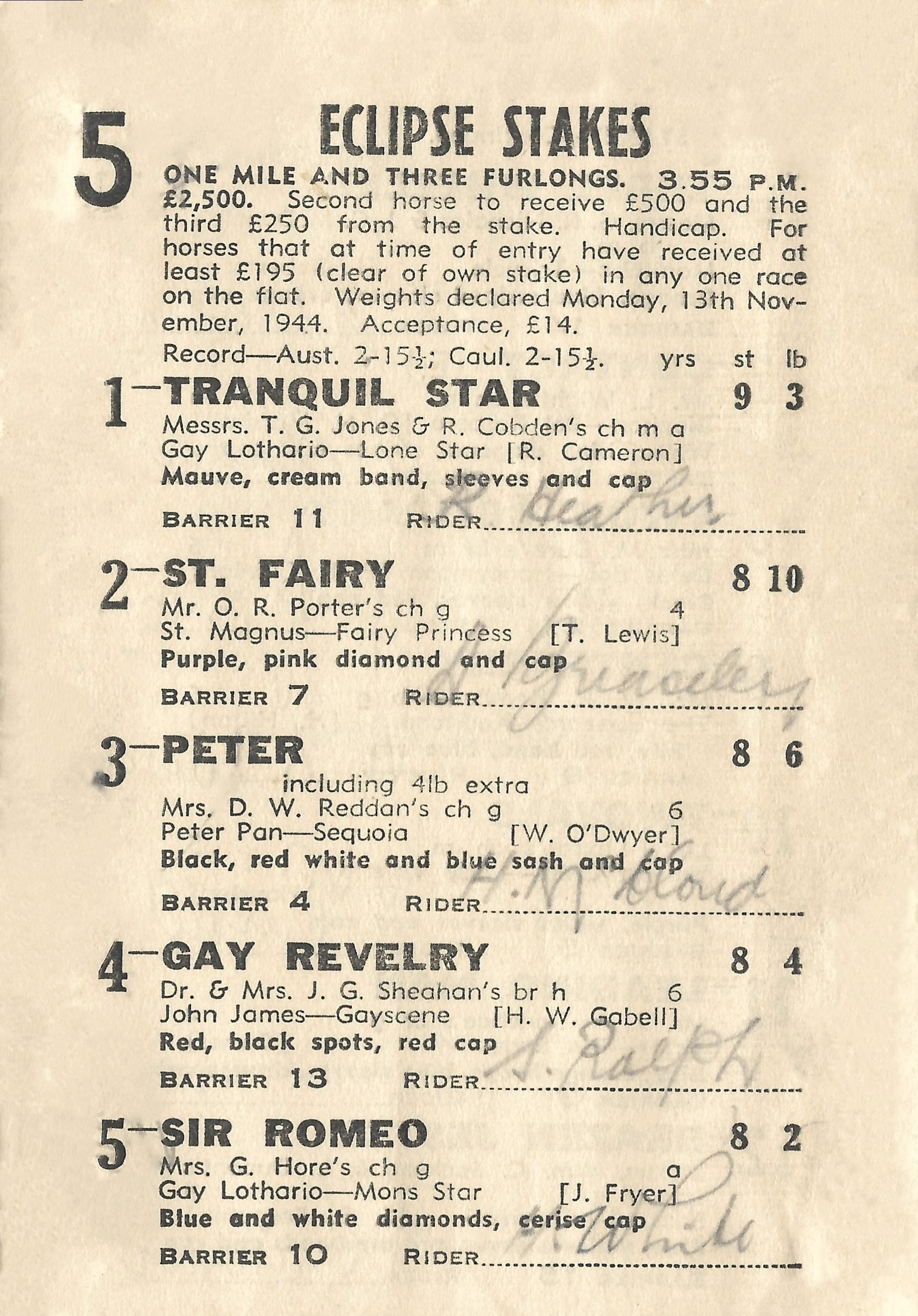
1944 VATC Eclipse Stakes starters and results showing the winner, Peter

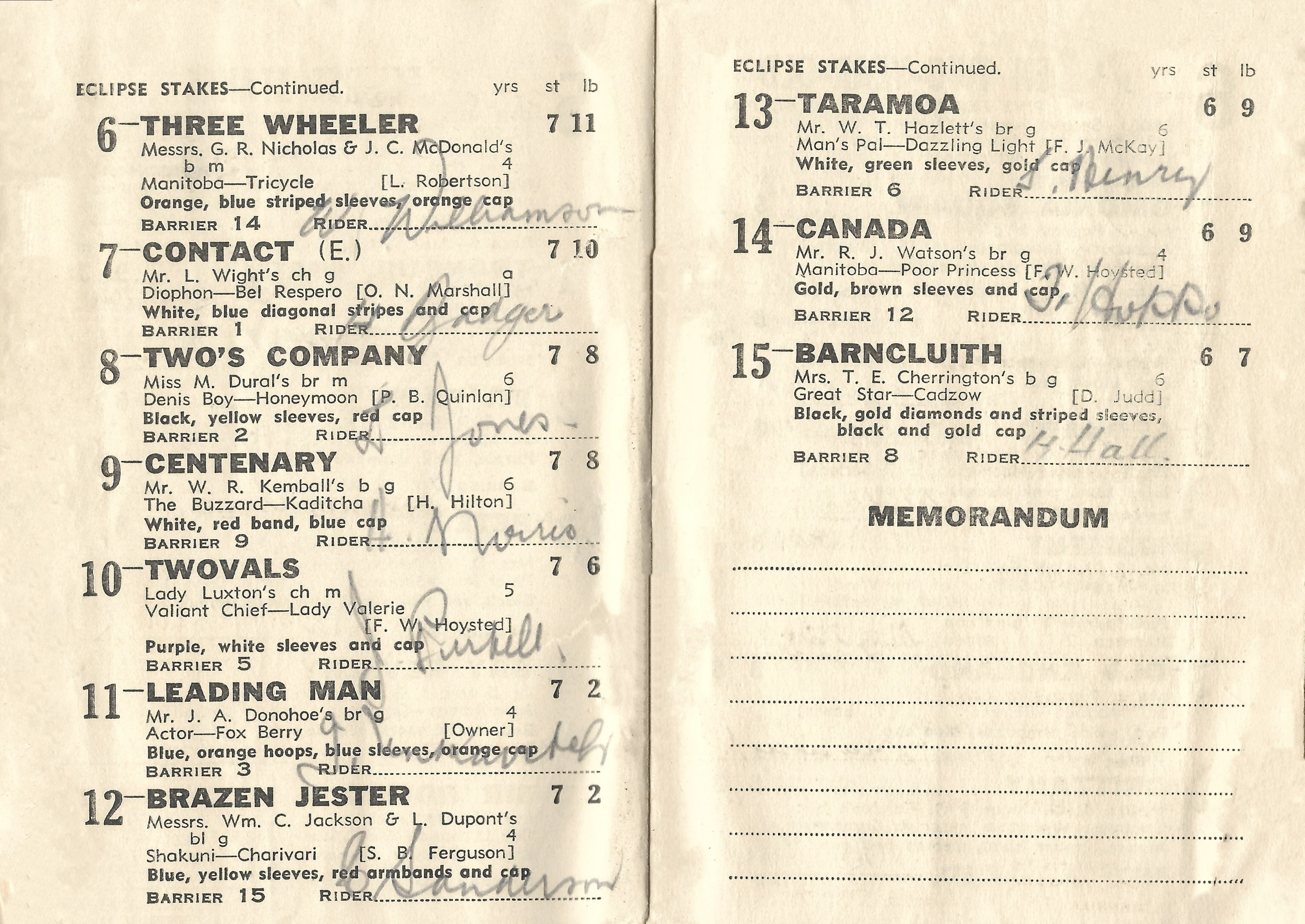
1944 VATC Eclipse Stakes page starters and results

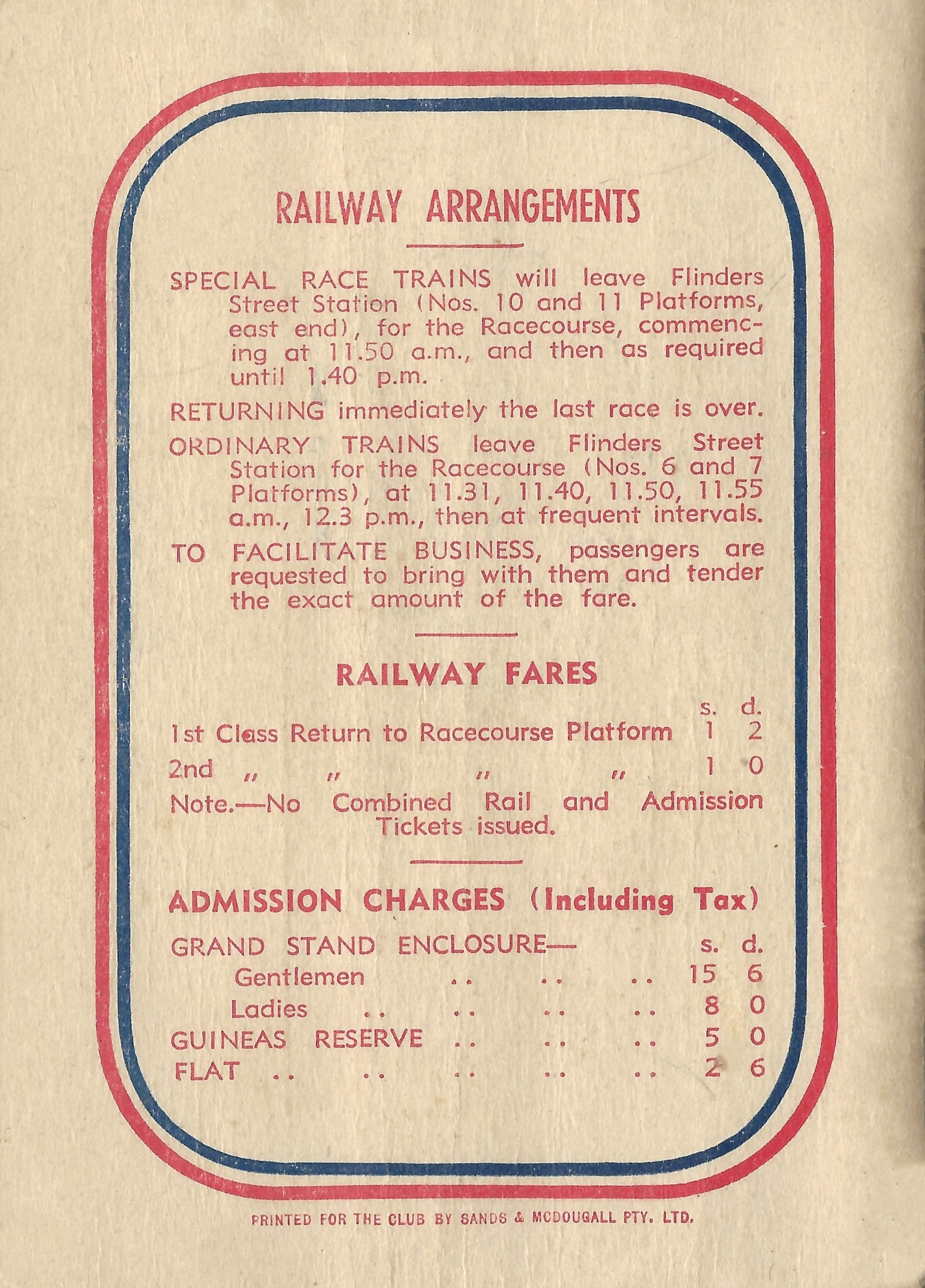
Back cover showing railway and admission charges

== Winners ==
The following are past winners of the race.

- 1937 - Balkan Prince
- 1938 - Manolive
- 1939 - Maikai
- 1940 - True Flight
- 1941 - Lucrative
- 1942 - race not held
- 1943 - race not held
- 1944 - Peter
- 1945 - Don Pedro
- 1946 - Propontis
- 1947 - Fine Fettle
- 1948 - Kongmeng
- 1949 - Bruin
- 1950 - Morse Code
- 1951 - Merry Scout
- 1952 - Morse Code
- 1953 - Rio Janeiro
- 1954 - Veiled Peak
- 1955 - Kosciusko
- 1956 - Baystone
- 1957 - Roman Holiday
- 1958 - Famed
- 1959 - Dawdie
- 1960 - Savage
- 1961 - Teppo Star
- 1962 - Delville
- 1963 - Bengal Tiger
- 1964 - Tobacco Leaf
- 1965 - Beau Guard
- 1966 - Gala Crest
- 1967 - Sunhaven
- 1968 - Wings Of The Morning
- 1969 - Our Faith
- 1970 - What's Brewing
- 1971 - Sky Call
- 1972 - Adrian
- 1973 - Perfect Time
- 1974 - Leica Lover
- 1975 - Shiftmar
- 1976 - Better Draw
- 1977 - Princess Veronica
- 1978 - Minuetto
- 1979 - Bit Of A Skite
- 1980 - Raspadora
- 1981 - Pride Of Century
- 1982 - Range Rover
- 1983 - Allez Bijou
- 1984 - Brave Salute
- 1985 - So Vague
- 1986 - So Vague
- 1987 - Prince Gano
- 1988 - Super Impose
- 1989 - Eastern Classic
- 1990 - Gamine
- 1991 - Luisant Bijou
- 1992 - Fraar
- 1993 - Palareign
- 1994 - Innocent King
- 1995 - Broann
- 1996 - Gold City
- 1997 - Burning Embers
- 1998 - Prime Address
- 1999 - Taberann
- 2000 - Tickle My
- 2001 - Fields Of Omagh
- 2002 - Damaschino
- 2003 - Zazzman
- 2004 - Requisite
- 2005 - Aqua D'Amore
- 2006 - Utility
- 2007 - Like It Is
- 2008 - Eskimo Dan
- 2009 - Bashful Girl
- 2010 - Viking Hero
- 2011 - Rothera
- 2012 - Eclair Surprise
- 2013 - Mouro
- 2014 - Zabisco
- 2015 - Casino Dancer
- 2016 - Turnitaround
- 2017 - Payroll
- 2018 - Tally
- 2019 - Pacodali
- 2020 - So Si Bon
- 2021 - Regalo Di Gaetano
- 2022 - Milford
- 2023 - Just Folk
- 2024 - New Energy
- 2025 - Casino Seventeen

== See also ==
- Blue Sapphire Stakes
- Zipping Classic
- List of Australian Group races
- Group races
