= Memsie Stakes =

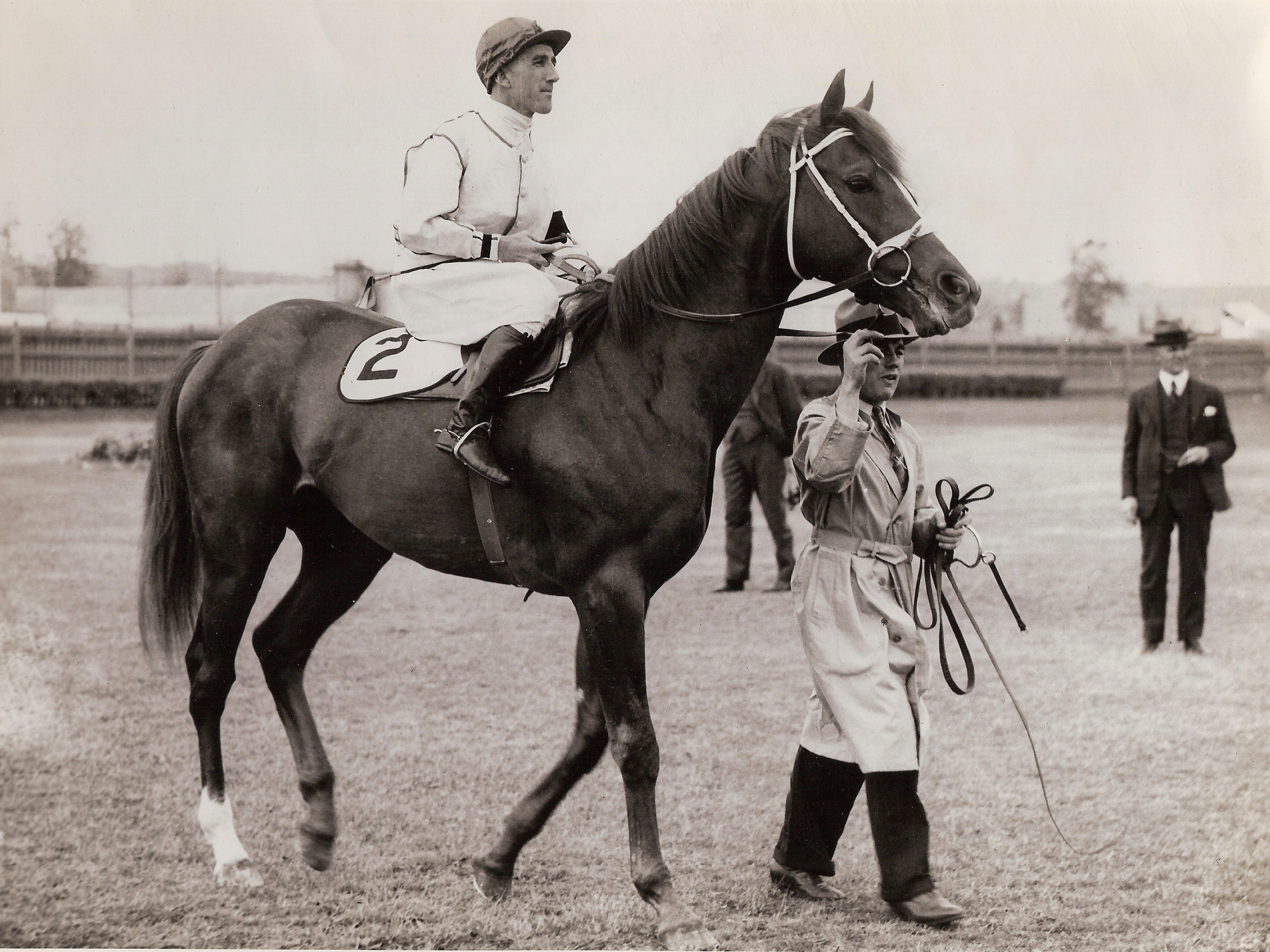
- Ajax, 1938, 1939, 1940 winner
- Class: Group 1
- Location: Caulfield Racecourse
- Inaugurated: 1899
- Race type: Thoroughbred
- Sponsor: https://www.stow-group.com (2022-2026)

Race information
- Distance: 1,400 metres
- Surface: Turf
- Qualification: Three-year-old and older that are not maidens
- Weight: Weight for age
- Purse: $750,000 (2026)

The Stow Memsie Stakes is a Melbourne Racing Club Group 1 Thoroughbred horse race held under weight for age conditions, for horses aged three years old and upwards, over a distance of 1400 metres. It is held at Caulfield Racecourse, Melbourne, Australia as a lead in to the Spring Racing Carnival.

== History ==
The race is often used as a lead-up race by good horses preparing for the longer feature races such as the Caulfield Cup, Cox Plate and Melbourne Cup. Such horses typically compete against less glamorous, and usually fitter, sprinter-milers who have been trained specifically for this race. Speed and fitness seem to prevail over class about half the time, as can be seen in the list of recent winners.

As the race comes early in the Spring, it will often indicate how well a horse has come back after its customary winter spell. There is sometimes just as much interest in the horses running on well from the back of the field, as there is in the actual winner. A good run by a staying horse in this race is often a good indicator of a successful Spring Carnival to come.

The Memsie Stakes is a virtually identical race to the P B Lawrence Stakes, another 1,400 metre weight-for-age race run at Caulfield usually earlier in August except that this is the first Group 1 in the racing season in Victoria.

The list of previous winners of the race contain recent champions, including Sincero, So You Think, Weekend Hussler, Makybe Diva, Sunline, Naturalism, Rancho Ruler, Manikato, and famous champions from the 20th century Galilee, Rising Fast, Comic Court, Lord (four times), Ajax (three times) and Phar Lap.

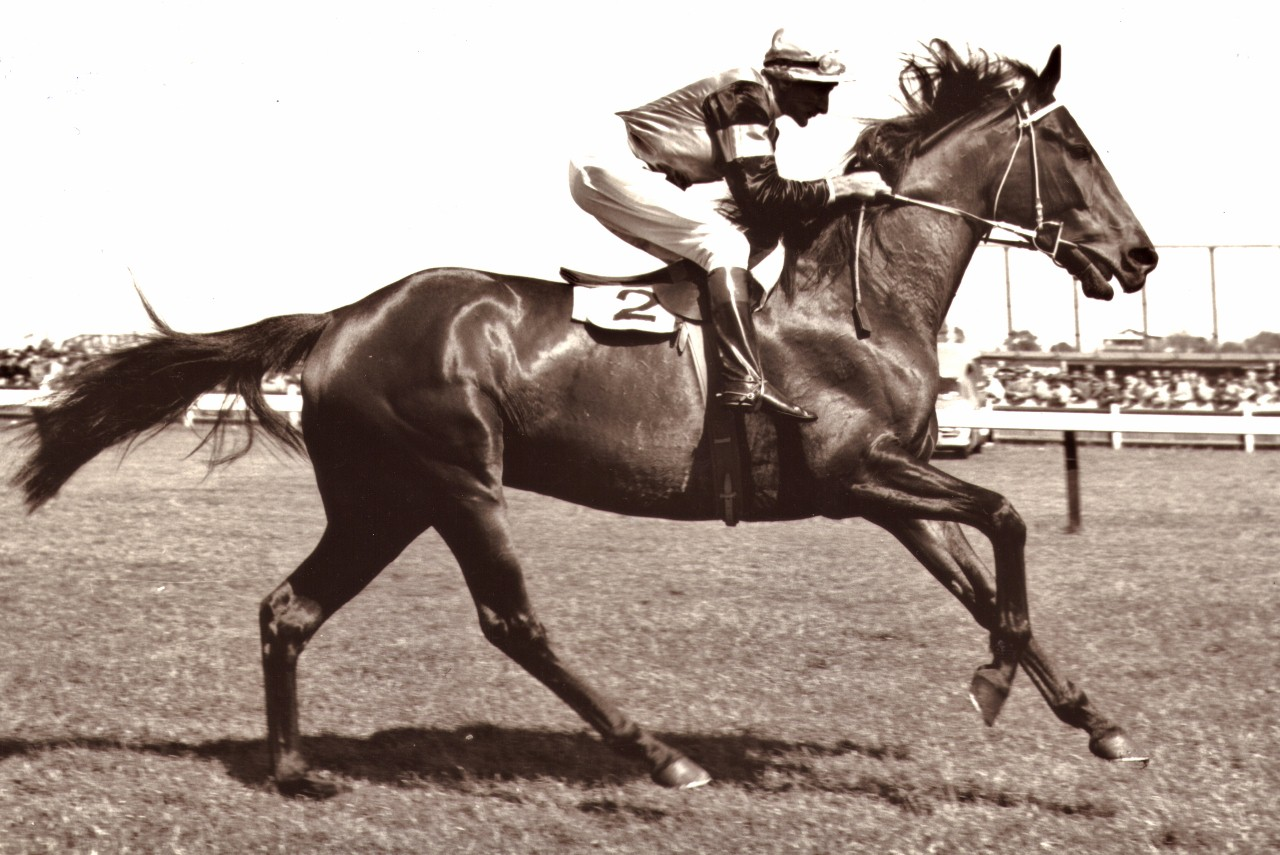
Rising Fast, 1956 winner

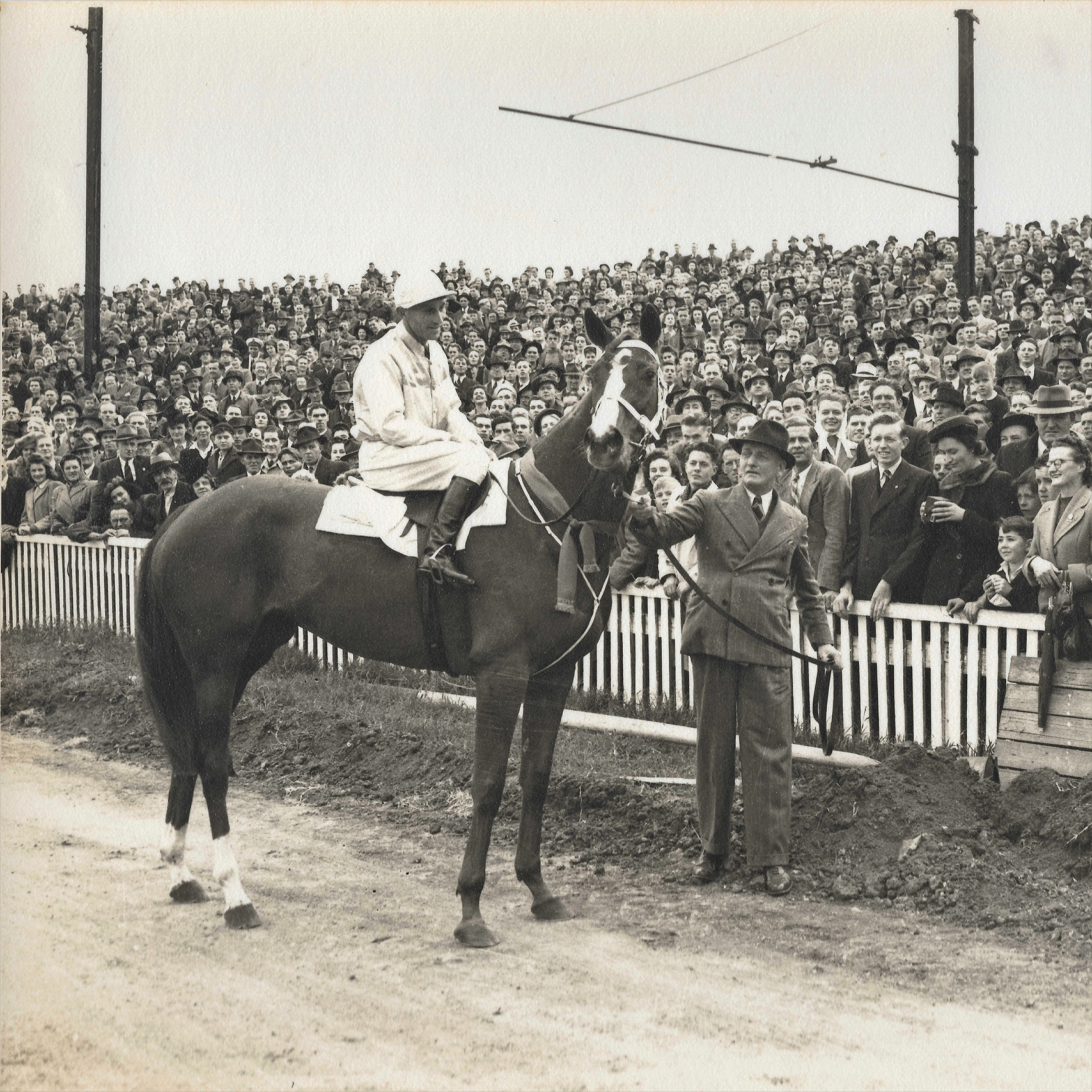
Tranquil Star, 1945 winner

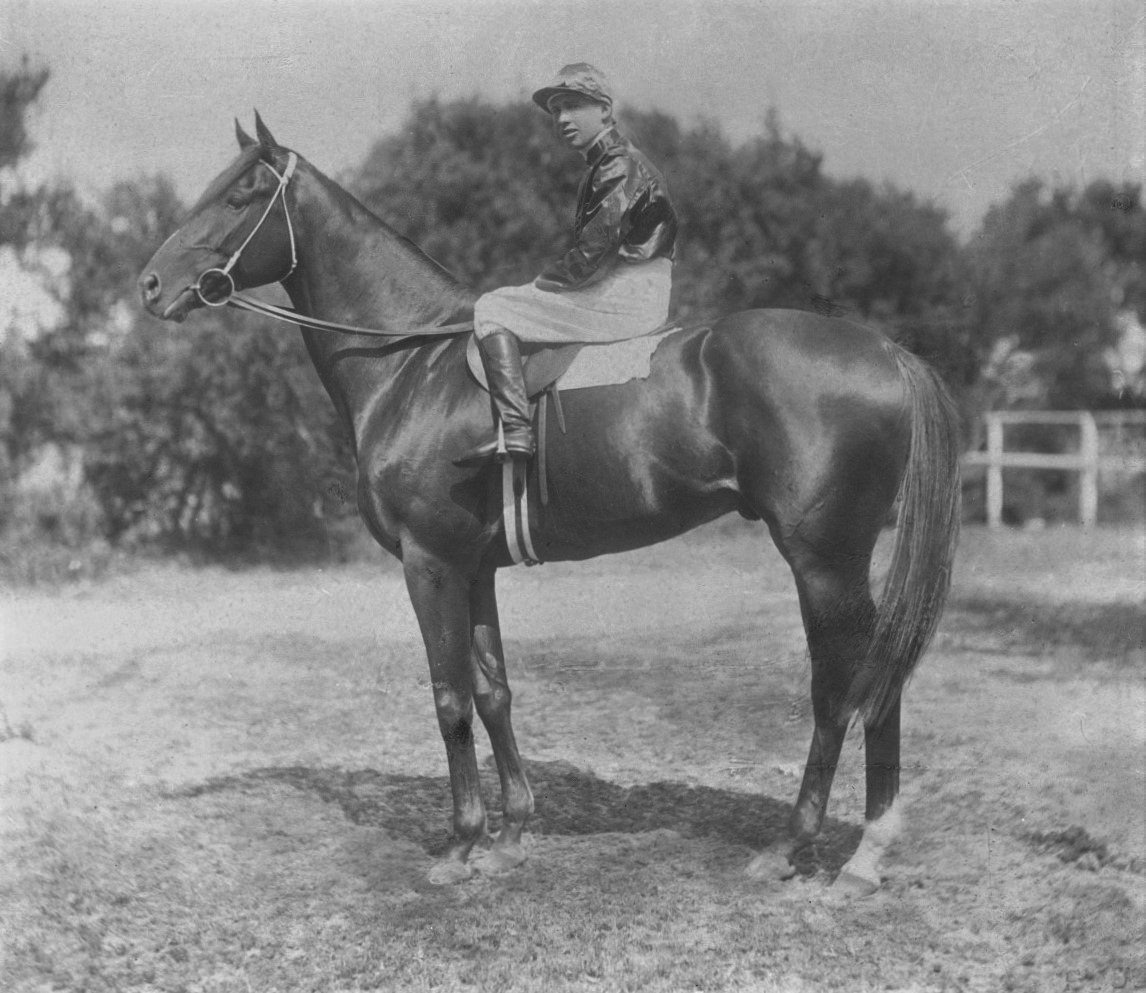
Eurythmic, 1920, 1921, 1922 winner

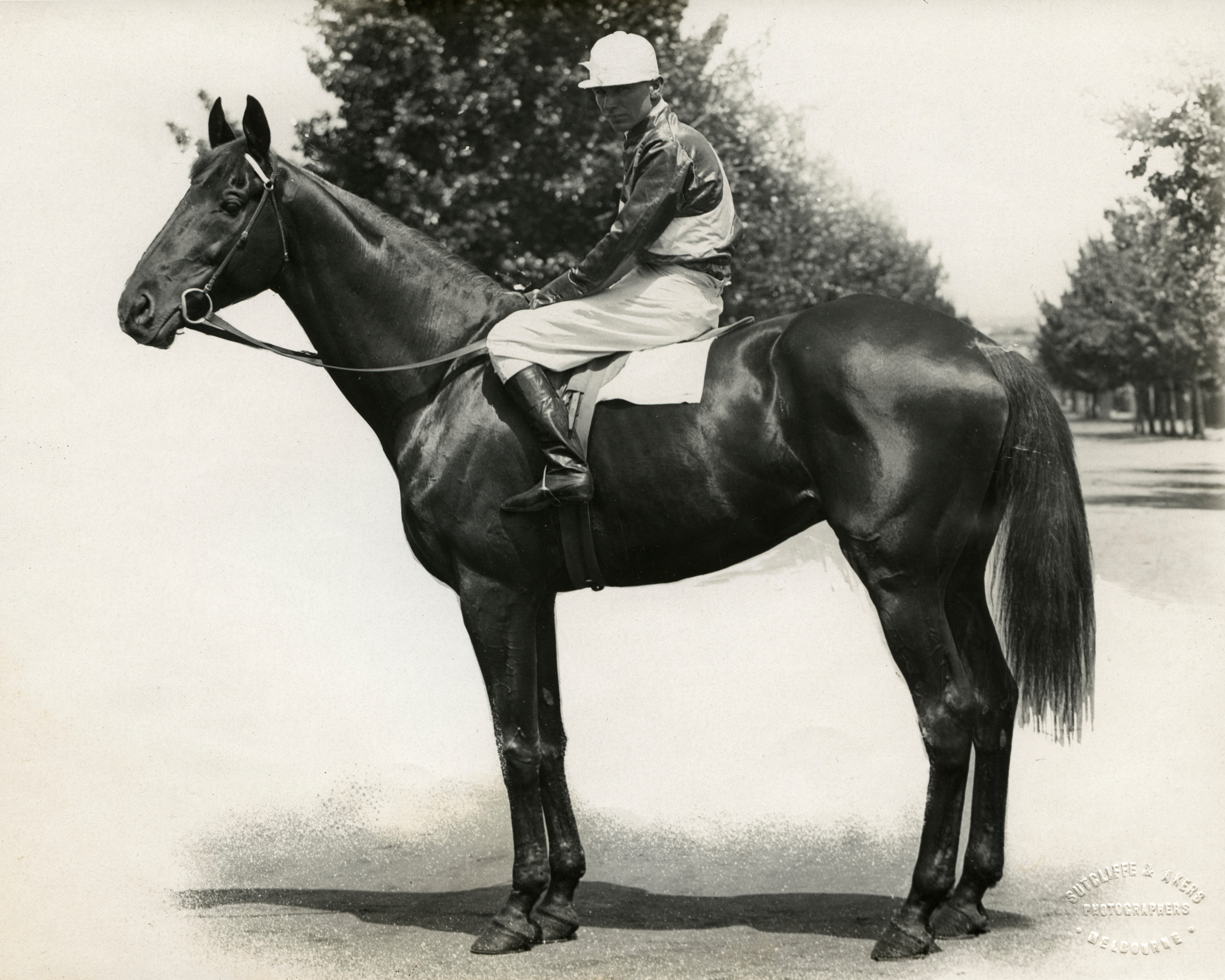
Uncle Sam, 1913 winner

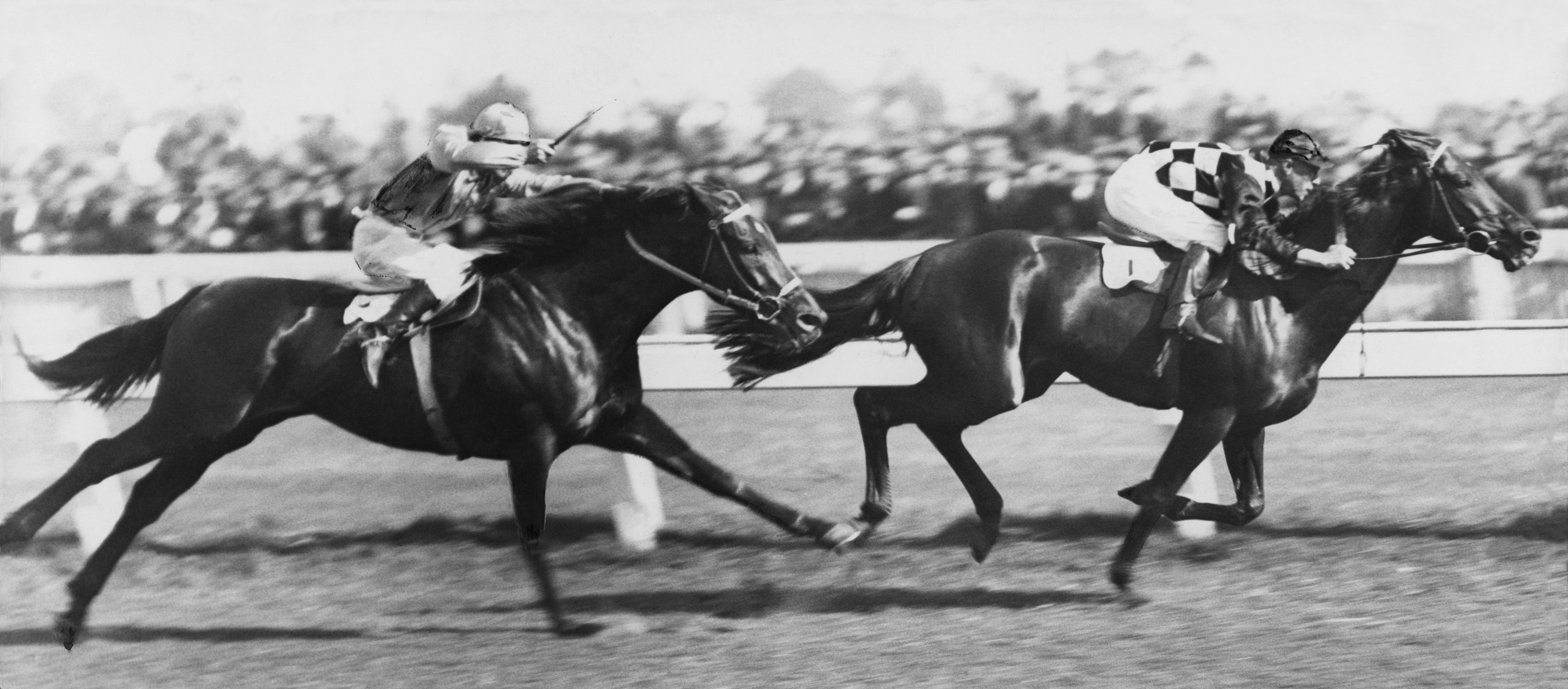
Gothic, 1928 winner

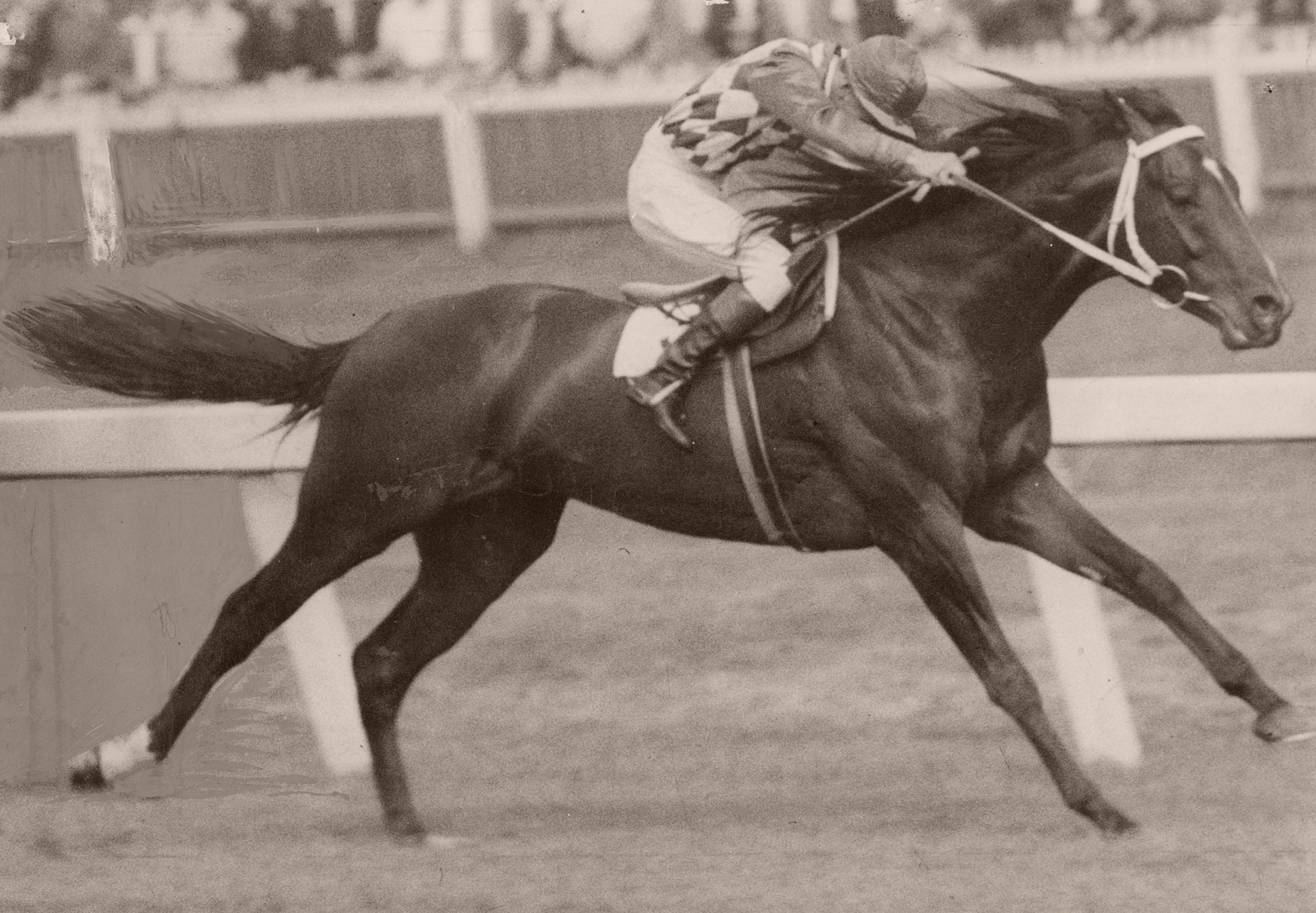
Comic Court, 1949 & 1950 winner

=== Distance ===
- 1899 -1 mile (~ 1600m)
- 1900–1980 - 1 1/8 miles (~ 1800m)
- 1971 - 1 mile (~ 1600m)
- 1972–1979 – 1600 metres
- 1980 onwards - 1400 metres

=== Grade ===
- 1899–1978 - Principal Race
- 1979–2012 - Group 2
- 2013 onwards Group 1

=== Venue ===
- 1899 - 1983 - Caulfield Racecourse
- 1984 - Sandown Racecourse
- 1985–present - Caulfield Racecourse

=== 1951 and 1954 racebooks ===
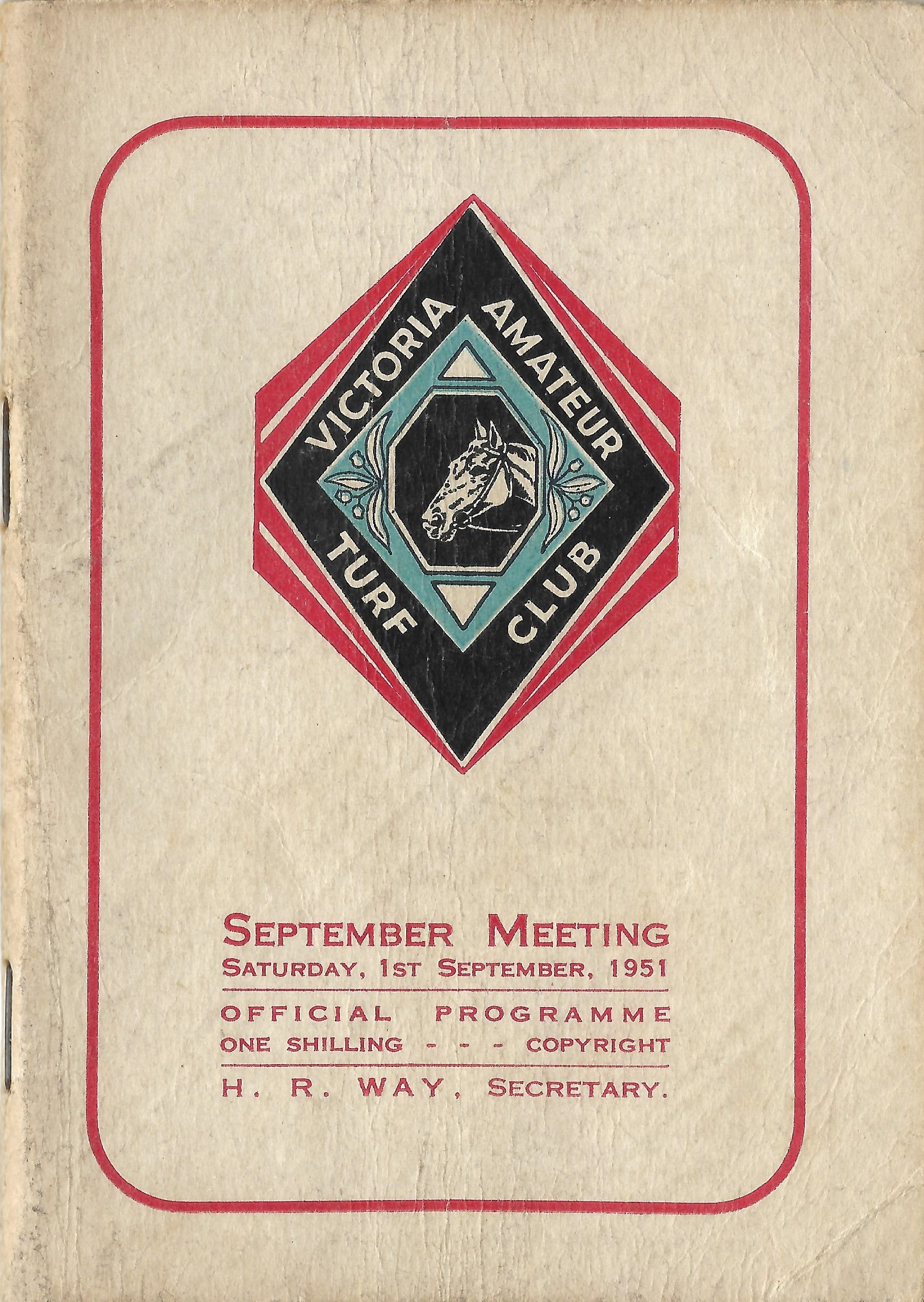
1951 VATC Memsie Stakes racebook front cover

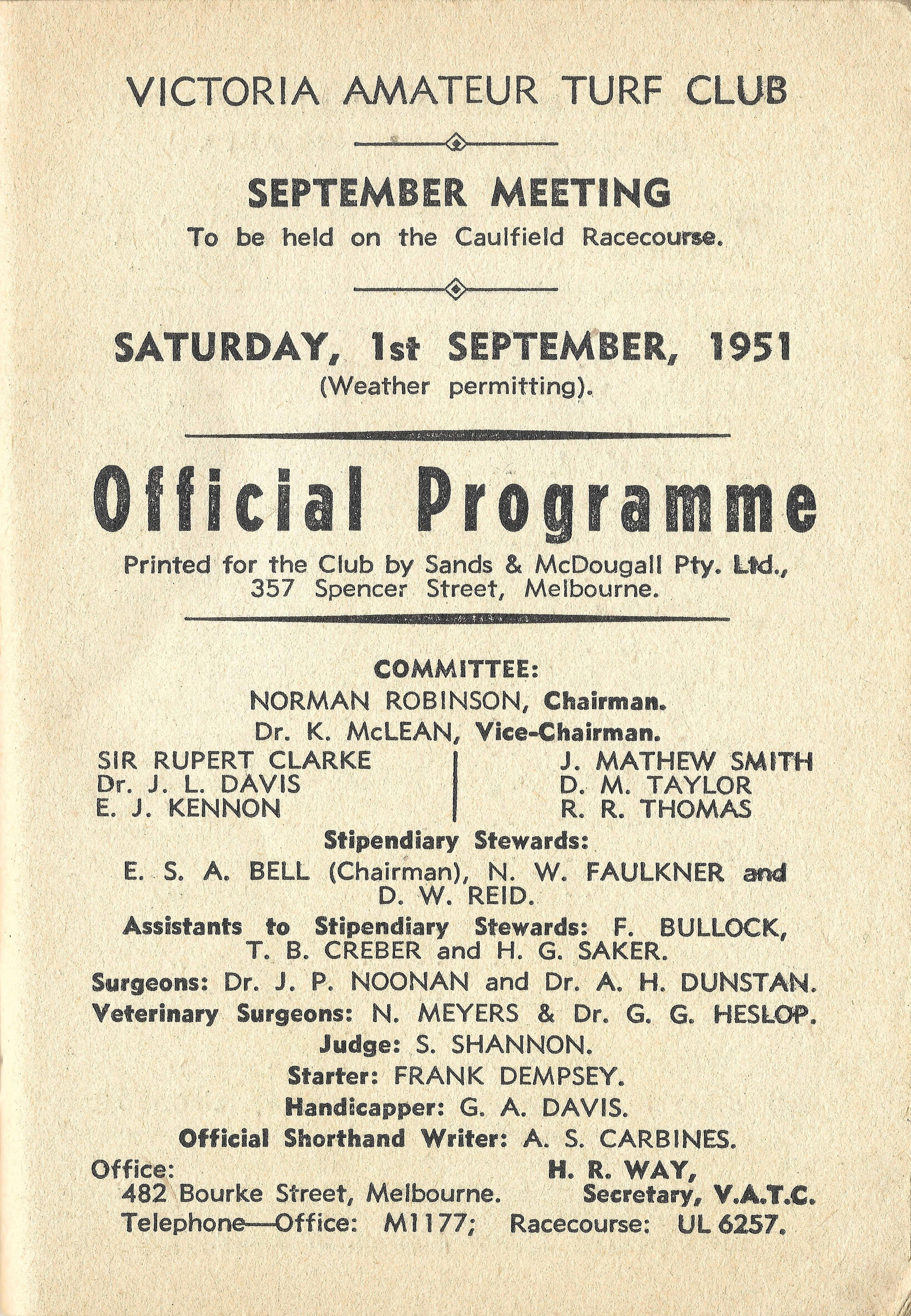
1951 VATC Memsie Stakes raceday officials

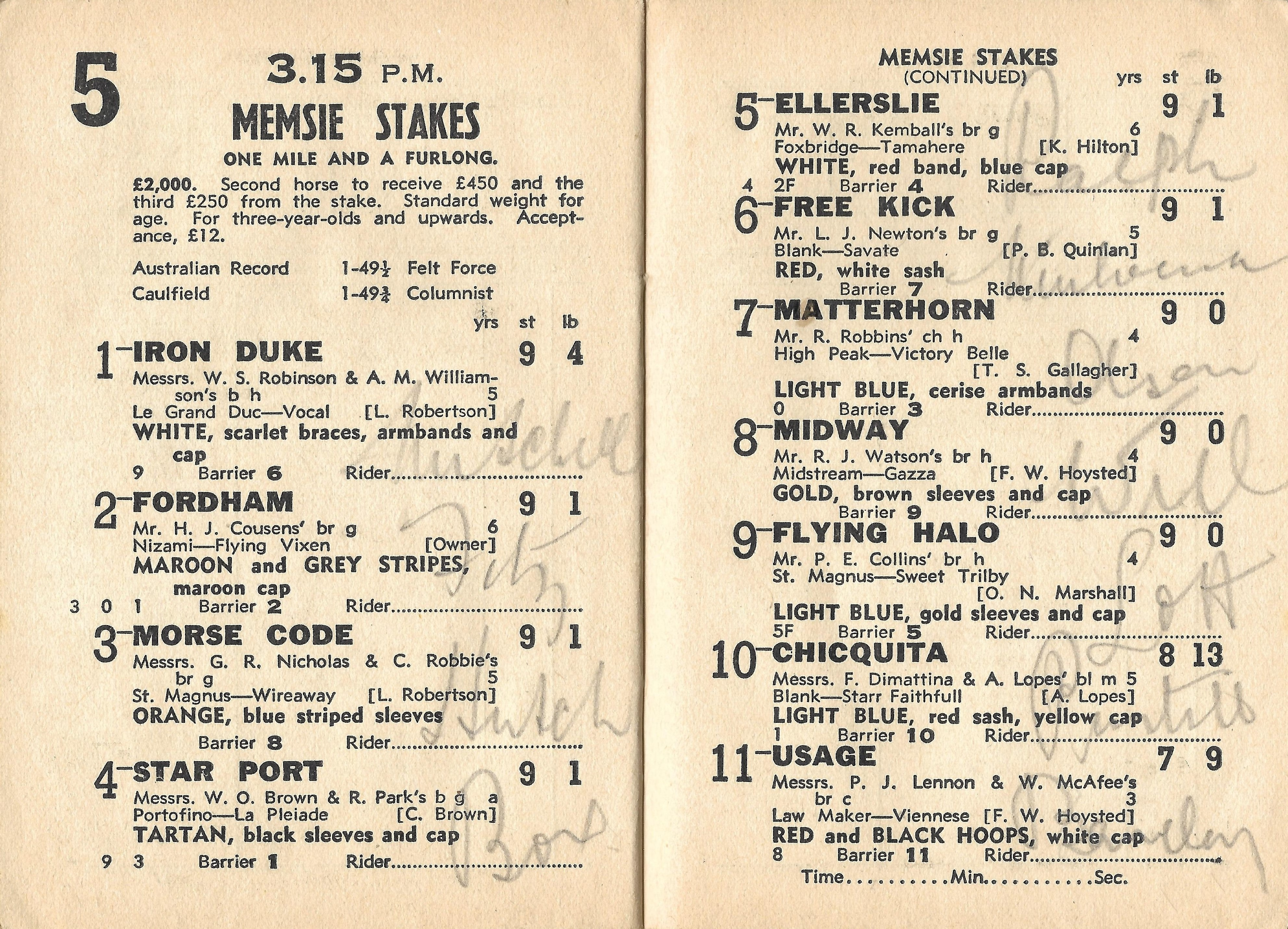
1951 VATC Memsie Stakes showing the winner, Ellerslie

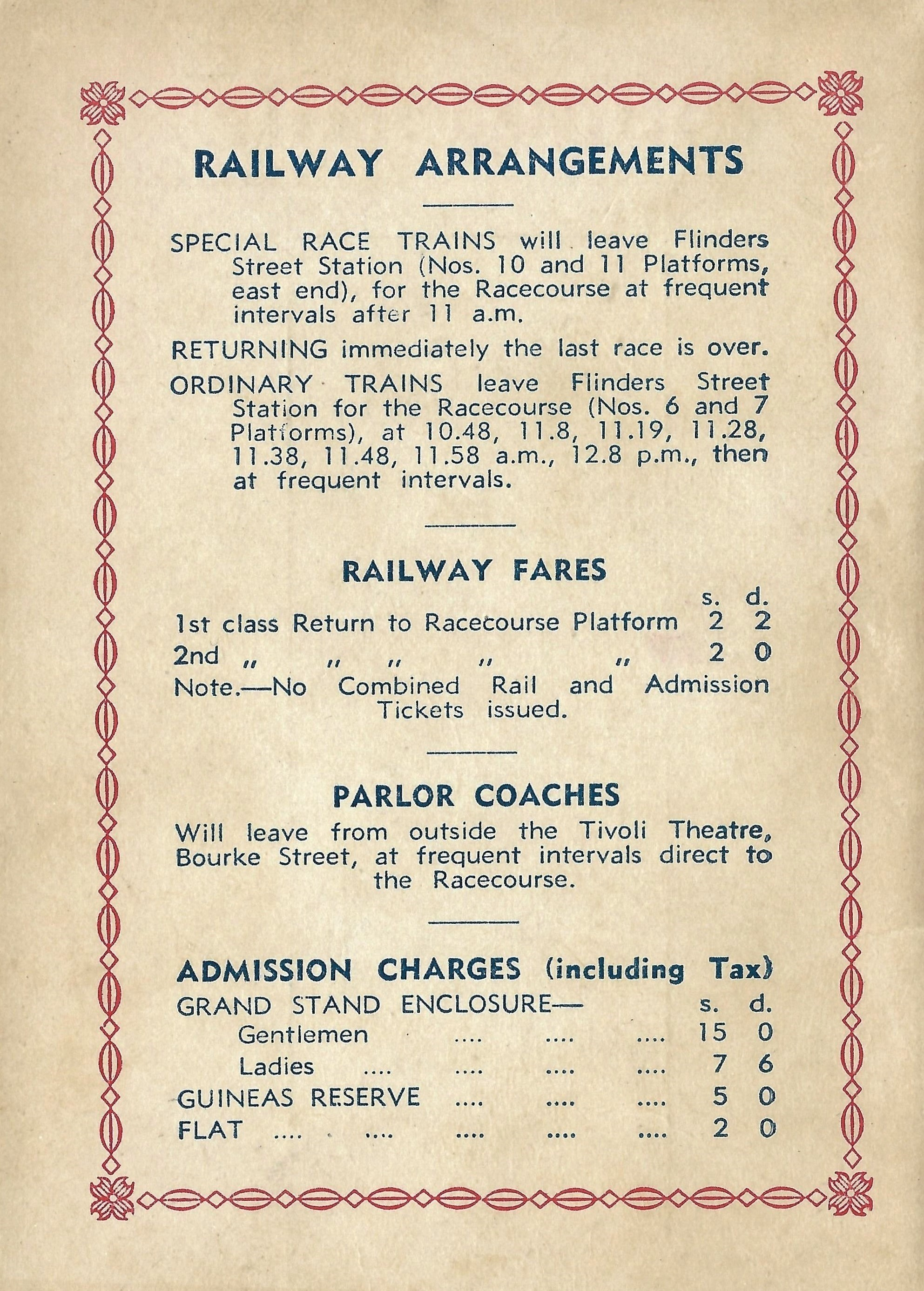
Back cover showing railway & entrance charges

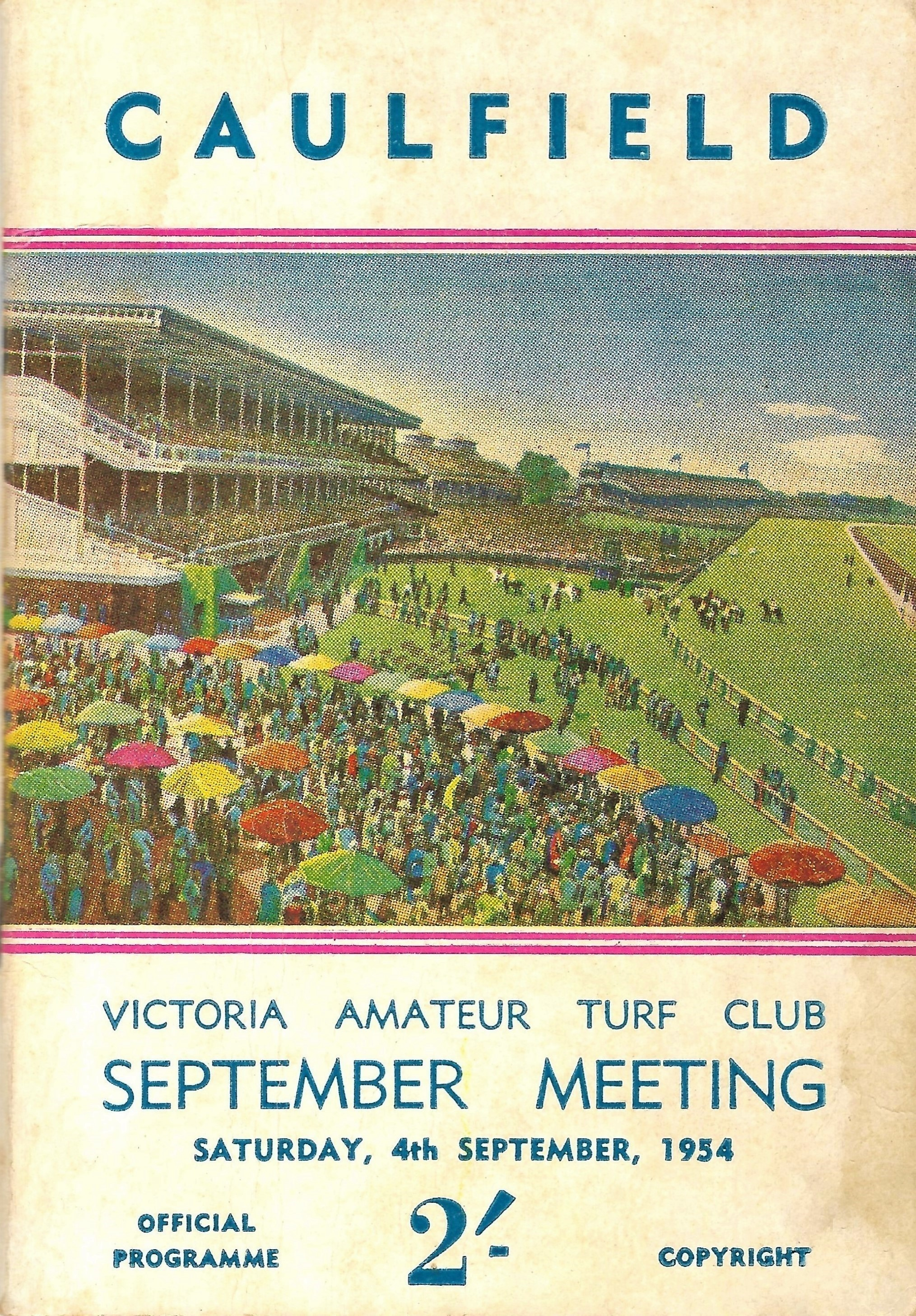
1954 VATC Memsie Stakes racebook front cover

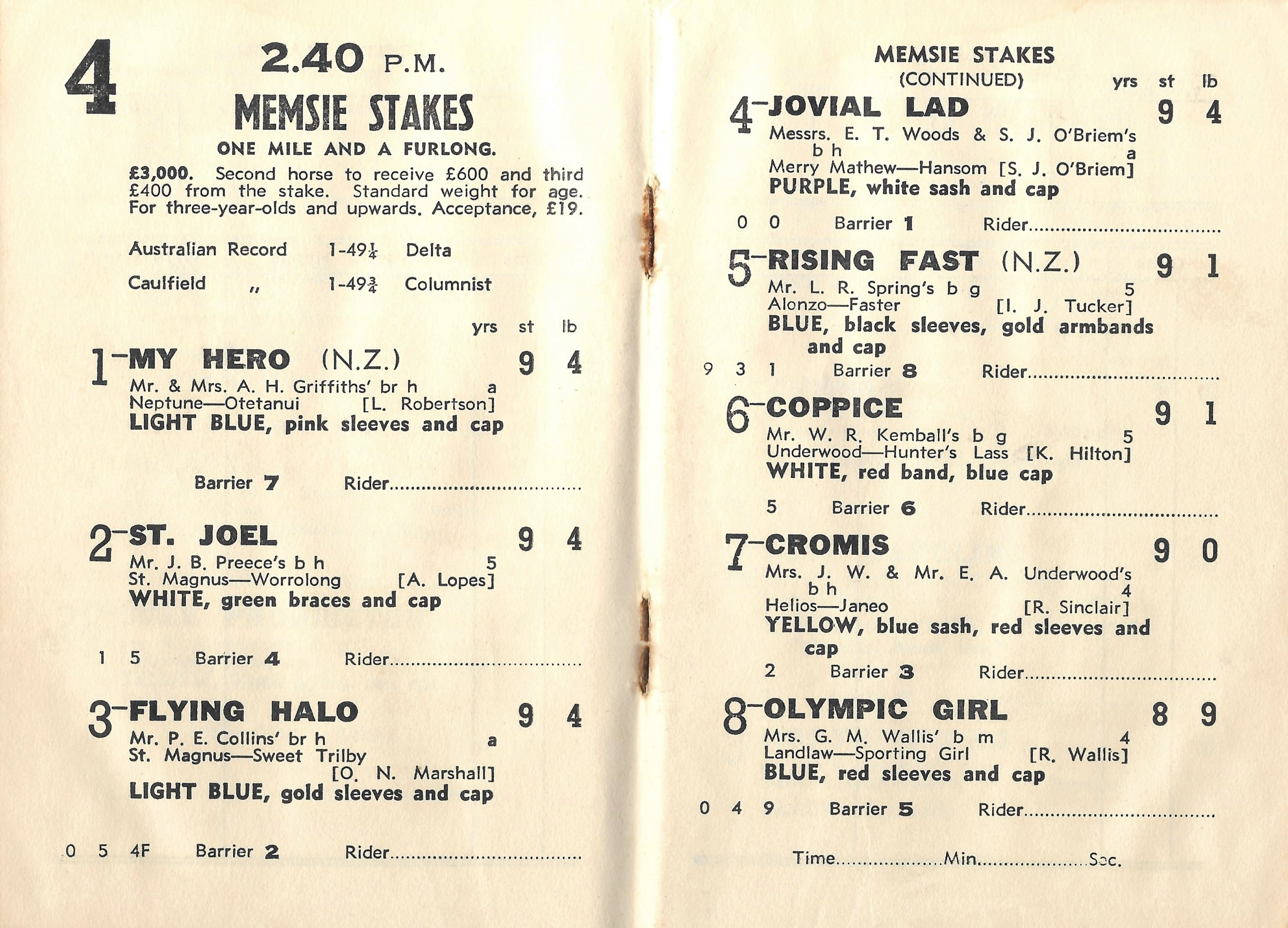
1954 VATC Memsie Stakes showing the winner, Coppice

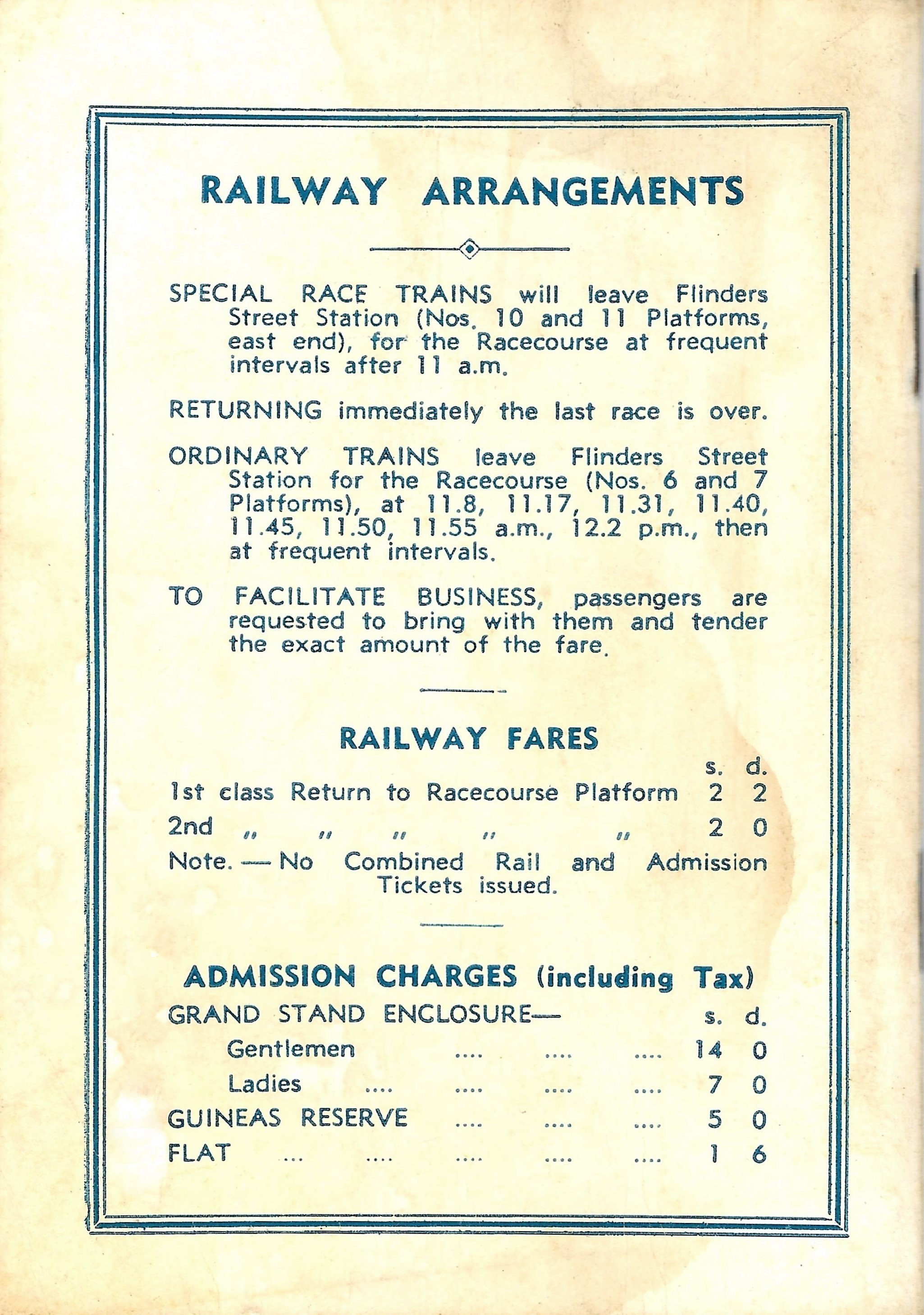
Back cover showing railway & entrance charges

== Winners ==
The following are past winners of the race.

- 2026 - Beiwacht
- 2025 - Treasurethe Moment
- 2024 - Pinstriped
- 2023 - Mr Brightside (NZ)
- 2022 - Snapdancer
- 2021 - Behemoth
- 2020 - Behemoth
- 2019 - Scales of Justice
- 2018 - Humidor
- 2017 - Vega Magic
- 2016 - Black Heart Bart
- 2015 - Boban
- 2014 - Dissident
- 2013 - Atlantic Jewel
- 2012 - Sincero
- 2011 - King's Rose
- 2010 - So You Think
- 2009 - Mic Mac
- 2008 - Weekend Hussler
- 2007 - Miss Finland
- 2006 - El Segundo
- 2005 - Makybe Diva
- 2004 - Regal Roller
- 2003 - Le Zagaletta
- 2002 - Magical Miss
- 2001 - Sunline
- 2000 - Sunline
- 1999 - Sir Boom
- 1998 - Dane Ripper
- 1997 - Tarnpir Lane
- 1996 - Sir Boom
- 1995 - Island Morn
- 1994 - Bundy Lad
- 1993 - Palace Reign
- 1992 - Naturalism
- 1991 - Redelva
- 1990 - The Phantom
- 1989 - Almurtajaz
- 1988 - Rancho Ruler
- 1987 - Rubiton
- 1986 - Dazzling Duke
- 1985 - Delightful Belle
- 1984 - King Delamere
- 1983 - Red Tempo
- 1982 - Manikato
- 1981 - Silver Bounty
- 1980 - Tolhurst
- 1979 - Arbre Chene
- 1978 - Crepellox
- 1977 - Wave King
- 1976 - Plush
- 1975 - Battle Sign
- 1974 - Nandalie Lass
- 1973 - Zambari
- 1972 - Longfella
- 1971 - Cyron
- 1970 - Ahjay
- 1969 - Fileur
- 1968 - Galilee
- 1967 - Grey Spirit
- 1966 - Yangtze
- 1965 - Yangtze
- 1964 - Future
- 1963 - Coppelius
- 1962 - Webster
- 1961 - Lord
- 1960 - Lord
- 1959 - Lord
- 1958 - Lord
- 1957 - Syntax
- 1956 - Rising Fast
- 1955 - Coppice
- 1954 - Coppice
- 1953 - Jovial Lad
- 1952 - Peshawar
- 1951 - Ellerslie
- 1950 - Comic Court
- 1949 - Comic Court
- 1948 - Lungi
- 1947 - Attley
- 1946 - Noble Prince
- 1945 - Tranquil Star
- 1944 - Lawrence
- 1943 - Sun Valley
- 1942 - David Innis
- 1941 - Lugano
- 1940 - Ajax
- 1939 - Ajax
- 1938 - Ajax
- 1937 - Black Mac
- 1936 - †Charles Fox / Valiant Chief
- 1935 - Hall Mark
- 1934 - Waltzing Lily
- 1933 - Waltzing Lily
- 1932 - High Brae
- 1931 - Phar Lap
- 1930 - Wise Force
- 1929 - Highland
- 1928 - Gothic
- 1927 - Royal Charter
- 1926 - Heroic
- 1925 - Heroic
- 1924 - Englefield
- 1923 - Maid Of The Mist
- 1922 - Eurythmic
- 1921 - Eurythmic
- 1920 - Eurythmic
- 1919 - Artilleryman
- 1918 - Eusebius
- 1917 - Harriet Graham
- 1916 - Price Bardolph
- 1915 - Traquette
- 1914 - Aleconner
- 1913 - Uncle Sam
- 1912 - Captain White
- 1911 - Flaith
- 1910 - Blairgour
- 1909 - Knox
- 1908 - Pink ‘Un
- 1907 - Subterranean
- 1906 - Retrencher
- 1905 - Bobadil
- 1904 - Wingaroon
- 1903 - Billali
- 1902 - Seclusion
- 1901 - Hymettus
- 1900 - †Eiridsdale / Massinissa
- 1899 - Veneda

† Dead heat

== See also ==
- The Heath 1100
- HDF McNeil Stakes
- Courtza Stakes
- List of Australian Group races
- Group races
