= SA Fillies Classic =

- Class: Group 3
- Location: Morphettville Racecourse, South Australia
- Inaugurated: 1951 (as South Australian Oaks)
- Race type: Thoroughbred
- Sponsor: Sportsbet (2025 & 2026)

Race information
- Distance: 2,500 metres
- Surface: Turf
- Track: Left-handed
- Qualification: Three year old fillies
- Weight: Set Weights
- Purse: $170,000 (2026)

The SA Fillies Classic is a South Australian Jockey Club Group 3 Thoroughbred horse race for fillies aged three years old, over a distance of 2500 metres at Morphettville Racecourse in Adelaide, Australia during the SAJC Autumn Carnival.

== History ==
After the introduction of the Australasian Oaks into the SAJC Racing Calendar the distance of the race was extended to 2400 metres. Prior to 1985 the race was held in the Spring. In 1979 the race was run at Cheltenham Park Racecourse and in 1980 the race was held at Victoria Park Racecourse.

=== Name ===
- 1951–2008 - South Australian Oaks
- 2009 onwards - SA Fillies Classic

=== Distance ===
- 1951–1972 - 1 1/4 miles (~2000 metres)
- 1973–1978 – 2000 metres
- 1979 – 1850 metres
- 1980–1985 – 2000 metres
- 1986–1994 – 2400 metres
- 1995–2009 – 2500 metres
- 2010–2011 – 2400 metres
- 2012 onwards - 2500 metres

=== Grade ===
- 1951–1979 - Principal Race
- 1980–2004 - Group 1
- 2005–2006 - Group 2
- 2007 onwards - Group 3

== Winners ==
The following are past winners of the race.

- 2026 - Fringes
- 2025 - Litzdeel
- 2024 - Positivity
- 2023 - Let'sbefrankbaby
- 2022 - The Amazonian
- 2021 - Mimi's Award
- 2020 - Realm Of Flowers
- 2019 - Moor Gait
- 2018 - Pleasuring
- 2017 - Ana Royale
- 2016 - Chabaud
- 2015 - Okahu Bay
- 2014 - Rezoned
- 2013 - Wowee
- 2012 - Red Typhoon
- 2011 - Precious Lorriane
- 2010 - Danaupair Starlet
- 2009 - Zapurple
- 2008 - Queen Of Queens
- 2007 - Watches
- 2006 - Dream The Dream
- 2005 - Irish Darling
- 2004 - Dowry
- 2003 - Larrocha
- 2002 - She’s Archie
- 2001 - Asia
- 2000 - Voile D’Or
- 1999 - Episode
- 1998 - Zacheline
- 1997 - Derobe
- 1996 - Miss Margaret
- 1995 - Cherontessa
- 1994 - Pindi
- 1993 - Our Tristalight
- 1992 - Ramyah
- 1991 - Lee’s Bid
- 1990 - Gamine
- 1989 - Heavenly Body
- 1988 - Lady Liberty
- 1987 - Marmalitre
- 1986 - Cimarra
- 1985 - †race not held
- 1984 - Neliska
- 1983 - Casey Belle
- 1982 - Irish Heiress
- 1981 - Cache
- 1980 - Brunisse
- 1979 - Argent Wonder
- 1978 - Runaway Bride
- 1977 - Deesse
- 1976 - In Pursuit
- 1975 - Ace Queen
- 1974 - Fondness
- 1973 - Ready Or Not
- 1972 - Little Papoose
- 1971 - Persian Bronze
- 1970 - Rain Amore
- 1969 - Goliette
- 1968 - Valide
- 1967 - My Lady Fair
- 1966 - Lady Twilight
- 1965 - Te Parae
- 1964 - Bluepak
- 1963 - Raindear
- 1962 - Lady Fontaine
- 1961 - Queen Dassie
- 1960 - Kind Mount
- 1959 - Rose Of Summer
- 1958 - Demeter
- 1957 - Gentle Touch
- 1956 - Sleep Tight
- 1955 - Wine Lover
- 1954 - Genteel Star
- 1953 - Never Rest
- 1952 - Sadiya
- 1951 - Gay Comedy

† Race not held in that year due to switch of race date in the racing calendar. The SAJC moved the race to the autumn for the 1985–86 racing season.

== See also ==
- David Coles AM Stakes (National Stakes)
- The Goodwood
- Proud Miss Stakes
- The Cummings Stakes (Robert A. Lee Stakes)
- Chairman's Stakes (SAJC)
- Euclase Stakes (Tobin Bronze Stakes)
- Schweppes Oaks (Australasian Oaks)
- South Australian Derby
- List of Australian Group races
- Group races
