= Proud Miss Stakes =

- Class: Group 3
- Location: Morphettville Racecourse, South Australia
- Inaugurated: 2004 (as Pink Diamond)
- Race type: Thoroughbred
- Sponsor: Sportsbet (2024-26)

Race information
- Distance: 1,200 metres
- Surface: Turf
- Track: Left-handed
- Qualification: Fillies and mares three years old and older
- Weight: Set weights with penalties
- Purse: $150,000 (2026)

The Proud Miss Stakes is a South Australian Jockey Club Group 3 Thoroughbred horse race for fillies and mares aged three years old and upwards, at set weights with penalties conditions over a distance of 1200 metres at the Morphettville Racecourse Adelaide, Australia in the Autumn Carnival.

== History ==
The race is held on The Goodwood race card on the last day of the SAJC Autumn Carnival.

The race is named after the brilliant two year old South Australian filly, Proud Miss who won nine consecutive races before finishing second in the 1962 Golden Slipper Stakes.

=== Name ===
- 2004–2005 - Pink Diamond
- 2006 - Chrysler Jeep Stakes
- 2007 - AV Jennings Home Improvements Stakes
- 2008 - Chrysler Jeep Dodge Stakes
- 2009 - Proud Miss Stakes

=== Grade ===
- 2006–2013 - Listed Race
- 2014 onwards - Group 3

== Winners ==
The following are past winners of the race.

- 2026 - Naifah
- 2025 - Cleo Cat
- 2024 - Boognish
- 2023 - Snapped
- 2022 - Seradess
- 2021 - Brooklyn Hustle
- 2020 - Humma Humma
- 2019 - Lady Cosmology
- 2018 - She's So High
- 2017 - Fuhryk
- 2016 - Runway Star
- 2015 - Hazard
- 2014 - Miss Steele
- 2013 - Assertive Eagle
- 2012 - Bonnie Mac
- 2011 - Dubleanny
- 2010 - Hanabananah
- 2009 - Burgeis
- 2008 - Soaressa
- 2007 - Zipanese
- 2006 - Clear View
- 2005 - Twinciti
- 2004 - Ice Dancer

== See also ==
- David Coles AM Stakes (National Stakes)
- The Goodwood
- The Cummings Stakes (Robert A. Lee Stakes)
- SA Fillies Classic
- List of Australian Group races
- Group races
