= The Goodwood =

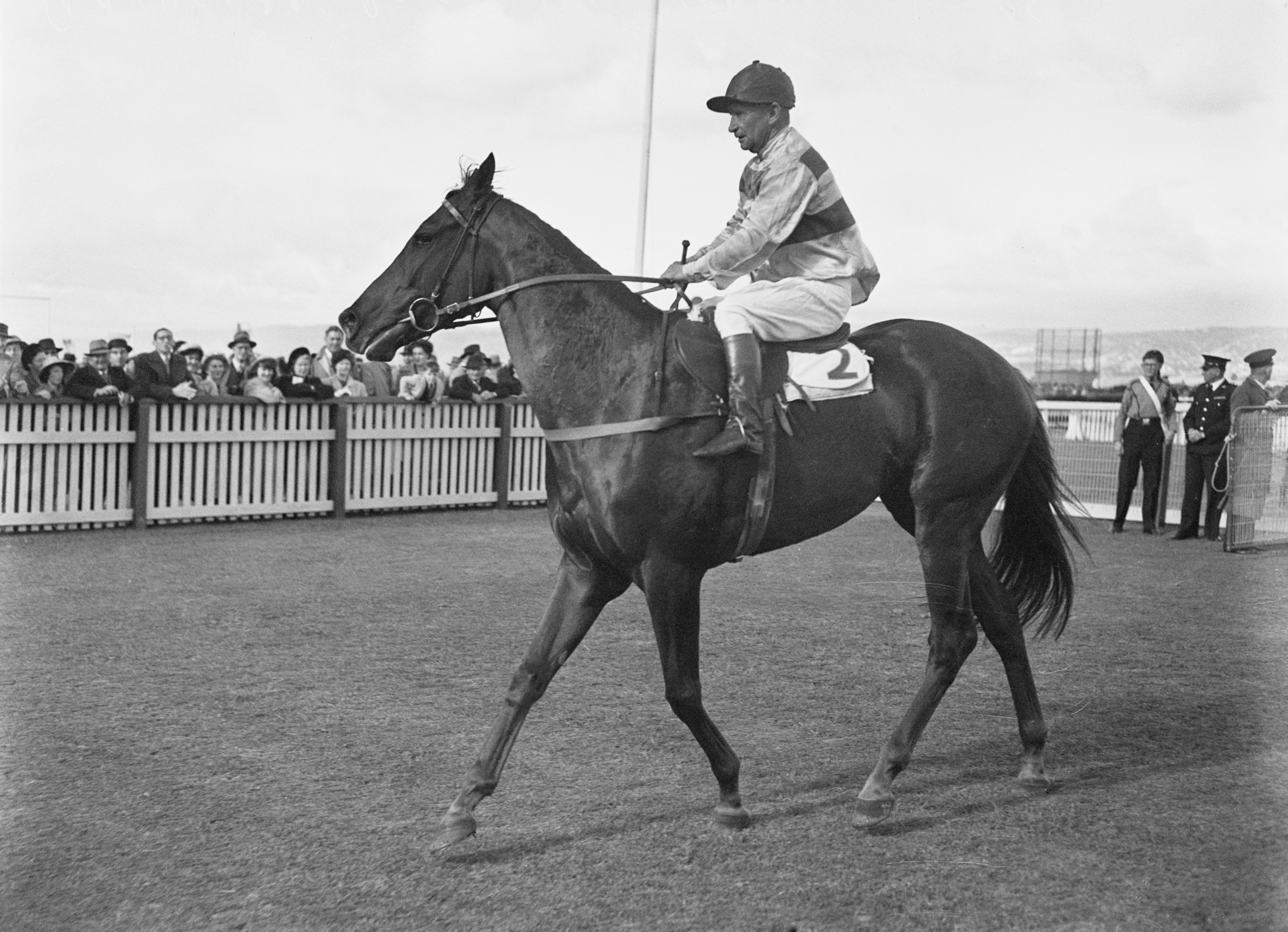
- Cellarman & Roy Medhurst
- Class: Group 1
- Location: Morphettville Racecourse, South Australia
- Inaugurated: 1881 (as the Goodwood Handicap)
- Race type: Thoroughbred
- Sponsor: Sportsbet (2024-26)

Race information
- Distance: 1,200 metres
- Surface: Turf
- Track: Left-handed
- Qualification: Horses three years old and older
- Weight: Set weights with penalties
- Purse: $1,000,000 (2026)

The Goodwood is a South Australian Jockey Club Group 1 Thoroughbred horse race for three years old and older, run at set weights with penalties, over a distance of 1200 metres at Morphettville Racecourse, Adelaide, South Australia in the SAJC Autumn Carnival.

== History ==
In 2007 the race conditions were set weights and penalties after previously being a handicap race throughout its 121-year history and was renamed The Goodwood from Goodwood Handicap. The race was a principal race until 1980 when it was granted Group 1 status. In the years between 1881–1885 the distance was one mile.
The race has always attracted high calibre sprinters, such as champions Black Caviar and Takeover Target. Two horses have won the race twice with Mostyn (1894–95) and Musket Belle (1911–12). Aurie's Star which won the race in 1940, had in previous seasons taken out the Oakleigh Plate twice and the VRC Newmarket Handicap.

=== Records ===
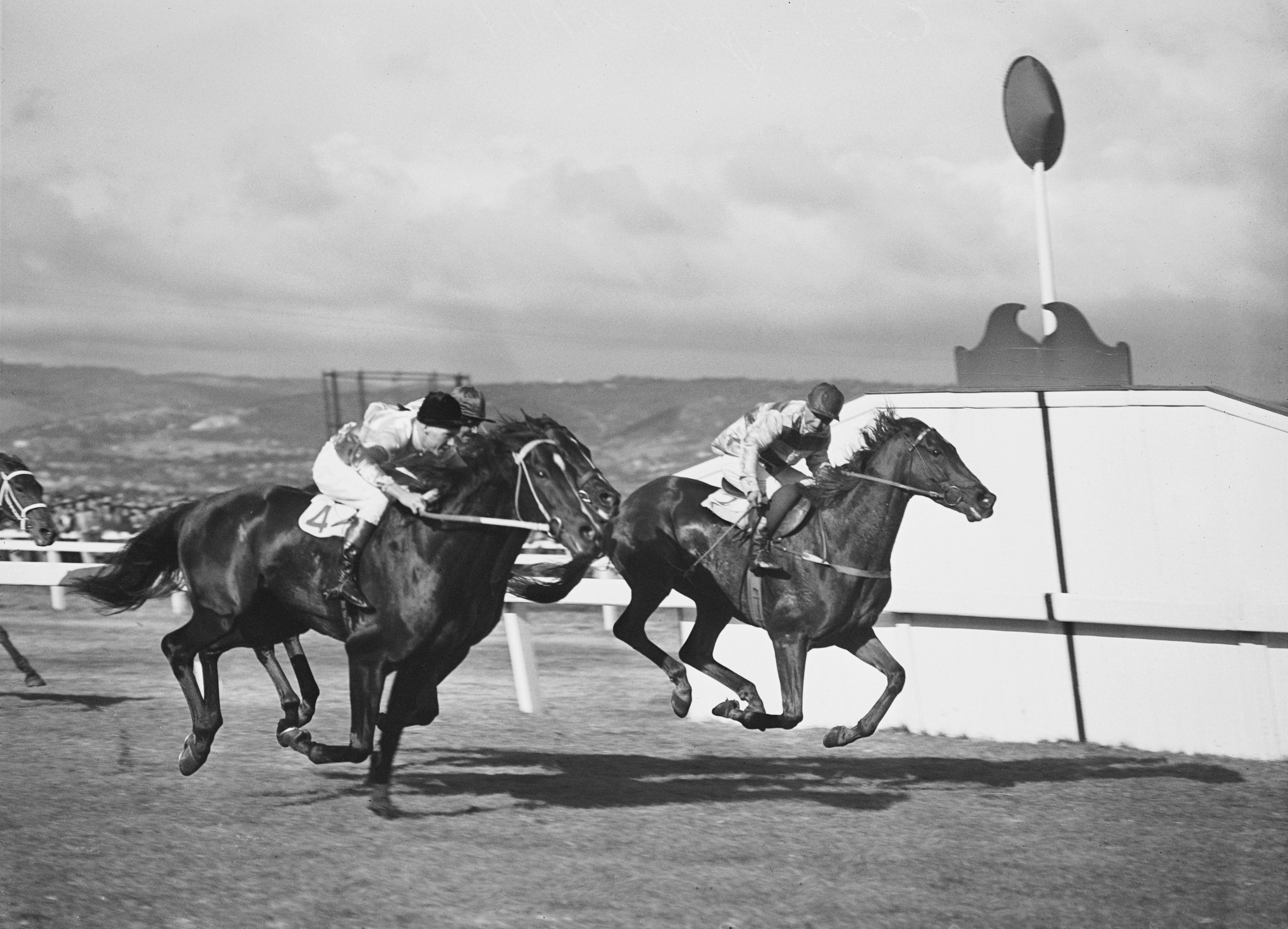
Cellarman, (inside) winning 1949

The leading trainer with five wins is Walter Hickenbotham and they were achieved in the first decade of the twentieth century (1901, 1902, 1906, 1909, 1910). South Australian jockey John Letts holds the record with five wins in the event (1961, 1972, 1973, 1977, 1984).

The race record time was set by Spectrum in 1998 in a time of 1:08.33.

=== Recent multiple winners ===
Trainers

- Mick Price in 2006 and 2010 and in partnership with Michael Kent (jnr) in 2022 and 2025.
- Peter Moody in 2012 and 2015

Jockeys

- Ben Melham in 2013, 2014 and 2018
- Steven King in 2005 and 2007
- Jamie Melham in 2024 and 2025.

== Winners ==
The following are past winners of the race.

- 2026 - Desert Lightning
- 2025 - Reserve Bank
- 2024 - Benedetta
- 2023 - Royal Merchant
- 2022 - Lombardo
- 2021 - Savatoxl
- 2020 - Trekking
- 2019 - Despatch
- 2018 - Santa Ana Lane
- 2017 - Vega Magic
- 2016 – Black Heart Bart
- 2015 – Flamberge
- 2014 – Smokin' Joey
- 2013 – Platelet
- 2012 – Black Caviar
- 2011 – Lone Rock
- 2010 – Velocitea
- 2009 – Takeover Target
- 2008 – Shadoways
- 2007 – Let Go Thommo
- 2006 – Perfectly Ready
- 2005 – Glamour Puss
- 2004 – Super Elegant
- 2003 – Bomber Bill
- 2002 – Zip Zip Aray
- 2001 – Keeper
- 2000 – Marstic
- 1999 – French Clock
- 1998 – Spectrum
- 1997 – Bellzevir
- 1996 – Sword
- 1995 – Centisle
- 1994 – Ambala
- 1993 – Jolly Old Mac
- 1992 – Euclase
- 1991 – Crush
- 1990 – Beau George
- 1989 – Boardwalk Angel
- 1988 – Cameronic
- 1987 – Daring Jon
- 1986 – Lord Galaxy
- 1985 – Mighty Avenger
- 1984 – Leica Planet
- 1983 – Bold Jet
- 1982 – Heavenly Time
- 1981 – Young Man
- 1980 – Marjoleo
- 1979 – Comaida Boy
- 1978 – Quiet Snort
- 1977 – Romantic Dream
- 1976 – Puncheon
- 1975 – Kenmark
- 1974 – Samist
- 1973 – Wise Virgin
- 1972 – Tango Miss
- 1971 – Romantic Son
- 1970 – Crown Lad
- 1969 – Grey John
- 1968 – Makadola
- 1967 – Picargo
- 1966 – High Income
- 1965 – Sunny Coronation
- 1964 – Kiltrice
- 1963 – Queen Dassie
- 1962 – Conrapt
- 1961 – Mikadis
- 1960 – Scenic Star
- 1959 – Bofresher
- 1958 – Sleep Tight
- 1957 – Hunter's Sight
- 1956 – Matrice
- 1955 – Copper Year
- 1954 – Gerante
- 1953 – First Scout
- 1952 – Jamboree
- 1951 – St. Comedy
- 1950 – Power's Hope
- 1949 – Cellarman
- 1948 – Denhoti
- 1947 – Galway Pipe
- 1946 – Royal Gem
- 1945 – Univari
- 1944 – Warworn
- †1942–43 – Race not held
- 1941 – Unishak
- 1940 – Aurie's Star
- 1939 – Panka
- 1938 – Hegemonic
- 1937 – Night Gang
- 1936 – Agargil
- 1935 – Isosceles
- 1934 – Sister Florence
- 1933 – Opera Bag
- 1932 – Valaisanne
- 1931 – St. Bernadette
- 1930 – Doradus
- 1929 – Glenanton
- 1928 – Second Dale
- 1927 – Triangle
- 1926 – Ben Lomond
- 1925 – Bright Poppy
- 1924 – St. Roseate
- 1923 – Denacre
- 1922 – St. Speed
- 1921 – Peace Day
- 1920 – Mareca
- 1919 – Trillion
- 1918 – Pistolarie
- 1917 – Bourlang
- 1916 – Blague
- 1915 – Golden Wire
- 1914 – Kosai
- 1913 – Widgiewa
- 1912 – Musket Belle
- 1911 – Musket Belle
- 1910 – Lord Derby
- 1909 – True Scot
- 1908 – Lord Carlyon
- 1907 – The Amazon
- 1906 – Step-Out
- 1905 – First Fleece
- 1904 – Latch Key
- 1903 – Trochon
- 1902 – Footbolt
- 1901 – Finland
- 1900 – Ranfurly
- 1899 – Forest
- 1898 – Australian
- 1897 – Orient
- 1896 – Tinstream
- 1895 – Mostyn
- 1894 – Mostyn
- 1893 – Britisher
- 1892 – Fulham
- 1891 – The Despised
- 1890 – Goldstream
- 1889 – Chetwynd
- ‡1886–88 –Race not held
- 1885 – Lantern
- 1884 – Ironmaster
- 1883 – Colstoun
- 1882 – Result
- 1881 – D.O.D.

Note:
† Race not held due to a ban on war time racing in the state.
‡ Race not held due to the Totalizator Repeal Act 1883.

== See also ==
- David Coles AM Stakes
- Proud Miss Stakes
- Robert A. Lee Stakes
- SA Fillies Classic
- List of Australian Group races
- Group races
