= Blue Sapphire Stakes =

- Class: Group 3
- Location: Caulfield Racecourse, Melbourne, Australia
- Inaugurated: 2005 (For two-year-olds); 2012 (For three-year-olds)
- Race type: Thoroughbred
- Sponsor: Quayclean (2025)

Race information
- Distance: 1,200 metres
- Surface: Turf
- Track: Left-handed
- Qualification: Three year old
- Weight: Set weights Colts and geldings 57 kg Fillies 55 kg
- Purse: $250,000 (2025)

The Blue Sapphire Stakes is a Melbourne Racing Club Group 3 Thoroughbred horse race held over 1200 metres at set weights for three-year-old horses at Caulfield Racecourse, Melbourne, Australia.

== History ==
The current rendition of The Blue Sapphire Stakes was inaugurated in 2012 with prizemoney of A$$250,000. Originally, from 2005 the MRC scheduled a two-year-old race in May known as the Blue Sapphire Classic. However, the MRC decided to re-format their Melbourne Spring Racing Carnival in 2012 by adding a new three-year-old race for sprinters. Entries which were nominated for the Blue Diamond Stakes earlier in the year as two-year-olds were automatically nominated for this event.

In 2012 the race was held on Caulfield Guineas day but since 2014 the race was moved to the second day of the carnival, the Wednesday meeting.

=== Grade ===
- 2014–15 - Listed Race
- 2016 - Group 3

=== Distance ===
- 2005 onwards – 1200 metres

=== Name ===
For two-year-olds:

- 2005–07 - Blue Sapphire Classic
- 2008–11 - Blue Sapphire Stakes
- 2012 - Redoute's Choice Stakes
- 2013 - Catanach's Jewellers Stakes

For three-year-olds:

- 2012 onwards - Catanach's Jewellers Blue Sapphire Stakes

== Winners ==
=== Three year old ===
Event held during the MRC Spring Racing Carnival.

- 2025 - Motorsports
- 2024 - Pisces
- 2023 - Run Harry Run
- 2022 - Grand Impact
- 2021 - Extreme Warrior
- 2020 - Ranting
- 2019 - Anaheed
- 2018 - Written By
- 2017 - Formality
- 2016 - Flying Artie
- 2015 - Keen Array
- 2014 - Eloping
- 2013 - Lion Of Belfort
- 2012 - Snitzerland

=== Two year old (2005– ) ===
From 2012 the race retained the Listed grading but was reregistered as the Redoute's Choice Stakes and is held in late April or early May.

- 2011 - City Of Song
- 2010 - Smokin' Joey
- 2009 - Black Caviar
- 2008 - Gold in Dubai
- 2007 - Emjay Hussay
- 2006 - Green Birdie
- †2005 - Readyforcatherine

† Run at Sandown Racecourse Hillside track

== See also ==
- Eclipse Stakes (MRC)
- Zipping Classic
- List of Australian Group races
- Group races
