= Kevin Heffernan Stakes =

- Class: Group 3
- Location: Caulfield Racecourse & Sandown Racecourse, Melbourne, Australia
- Inaugurated: 2000
- Race type: Thoroughbred
- Sponsor: https://www.henley.com.au/ (2026)

Race information
- Distance: 1,400 metres (2021-)
- Surface: Turf
- Track: Left-handed
- Qualification: Three year olds and older that are not maidens
- Weight: Weight for age
- Purse: $200,000 (2026)

The Kevin Heffernan Stakes is a Melbourne Racing Club Group 3 Thoroughbred weight for age horse race, for horses aged three years old and upwards, over a distance of 1,400 metres held at Caulfield Racecourse and previously at Sandown Racecourse, Melbourne, Australia.

== History ==
The Kevin Heffernan Stakes, first run in 2000, is named after the former committeeman of the Victoria Amateur Turf Club and Melbourne Racing Club, who died in 2012.

In 2013 the event was held at Caulfield Racecourse due to construction at Sandown Racecourse.

From 2021 the race has been run at Caulfield Racecourse.

Traditionally held in late November it was moved to early February in 2026.

=== Grade ===
- 2001–2012 - Listed race
- 2013 onwards - Group 3

=== Distance ===
- 2001–2003 - 1200 metres
- 2004 - 1250 metres
- 2005 - 1300 metres
- 2006–2007 - 1200 metres
- 2008–2012 - 1300 metres
- 2013 - 1200 metres
- 2014 - 2020 - 1300 metres
- 2021 onwards - 1400 metres

== Winners ==
The following are past winners of the race.

- 2026 - Tom Kitten
- 2025 (no race held)
- 2024 - Welwal
- 2023 - King Magnus
- 2022 - Crosshaven
- 2021 - Sinawann
- 2020 - Kemalpasa
- 2019 - Teleplay
- 2018 - Cool Passion
- 2017 - Jungle Edge
- 2016 - Lucky Hussler
- 2015 - Famous Seamus
- 2014 - Fast 'n' Rocking
- 2013 - Lankan Rupee
- 2012 - Mid Summer Music
- 2011 - Soul
- 2010 - Avenue
- 2009 - Lucky Secret
- 2008 - Captain Bax
- 2007 - Gibraltar Campion
- 2006 - Tesbury Jack
- 2005 - Bomber Bill
- 2004 - Brannigan
- 2003 - Super Groove
- 2002 - Century Kid
- 2001 - Chattanooga
- 2000 - Sports

== See also ==
- List of Australian Group races
- Group races
