= Thoroughbred Club Stakes =

- Class: Group 3
- Location: Caulfield Racecourse, Melbourne, Australia
- Inaugurated: 1957 (as Maroona Handicap)
- Race type: Thoroughbred
- Sponsor: Thoroughbred Club of Australia

Race information
- Distance: 1,200 metres
- Surface: Turf
- Track: Left-handed
- Qualification: Three year old fillies
- Weight: Set weights with penalties
- Purse: $1,000,000 (2026)

The Thoroughbred Club Stakes is a Melbourne Racing Club Group 3 Thoroughbred horse race, for three-year-old fillies, at set weights with penalties, over a distance of 1200 metres, held annually at Caulfield Racecourse in Melbourne, Australia in October.

== History ==
The race was first run as the Maroona Handicap in 1957 and won by New Light, who was ridden by the champion jockey George Moore. The race has since been held on the first day of the MRC Spring Carnival.

=== Name ===
- 1957–1976 - Maroona Handicap
- 1976 onwards - Thoroughbred Club Stakes

=== Distance ===
- 1957–1962 - 5½ furlongs (~1100 metres)
- 1963–1971 - 6 furlongs (~1200 metres)
- 1972–1973 - 1200 metres
- 1974–1999 - 1400 metres
- 2000 onwards - 1200 metres

=== Grade ===
- 1976–1978 - Principal race
- 1979 onwards - Group 3

== Winners ==
The following are past winners of the race.

- 2026 - Natural Fling
- 2025 - Inkaruna
- 2024 - Jasmin Rouge
- 2023 - Brazen Style
- 2022 - English Riviera
- 2021 - Sneaky Five
- 2020 - Swats That
- 2019 - California Zimbol
- 2018 - Sunlight
- 2017 - Invincible Star
- 2016 - Hear The Chant
- 2015 - Serene Majesty
- 2014 - Earthquake
- 2013 - Missy Longstocking
- 2012 - Cavalry Rose
- 2011 - Platelet
- 2010 - Solar Charged
- 2009 - Avenue
- 2008 - Damselfly
- 2007 - Gamble Me
- 2006 - Splashing Out
- 2005 - Queen Of The Hill
- 2004 - Emlozza
- 2003 - Crown Princess
- 2002 - Innovation Girl
- 2001 - Patterns
- 2000 - Arrabeea
- 1999 - Camargue
- 1998 - Speedy Kids
- 1997 - Cornwall Queen
- 1996 - Flaming Heart
- 1995 - Vigil
- 1994 - Verocative
- 1993 - Cairncross
- 1992 - Googs Dream
- 1991 - Cushion
- 1990 - Mammy
- 1989 - Lady Of Perfection
- 1988 - Boardwalk Angel
- 1987 - Imposera
- 1986 - Why Julie
- 1985 - Tonephil
- 1984 - Delightful Belle
- 1983 - Fear Burst
- 1982 - Sovereign Palace
- 1981 - Voli Dream
- 1980 - Biscadale
- 1979 - Lady's Slipper
- 1978 - Just Landed
- 1977 - Miss Expensive
- 1976 - Happy Kitten
- 1975 - † Vamp / Silver Sari
- 1974 - Honoured
- 1973 - † Orinthos / Fulmina
- 1972 - Make Mine Roses
- 1971 - † Abinger / Tina's Joy
- 1970 - Intention
- 1969 - Via
- 1968 - Threat

† Run in Divisions

== See also ==
- C F Orr Stakes
- How Now Stakes
- Sandown Guineas
- Summoned Stakes
- Zipping Classic
- List of Australian Group races
- Group races
