= Sandown Stakes =

- Class: Group 3
- Location: Sandown Racecourse, Melbourne, Australia
- Inaugurated: 1981
- Race type: Thoroughbred
- Sponsor: Sportsbet (2024 & 2025)

Race information
- Distance: 1,500 metres
- Surface: Turf
- Track: Left-handed
- Qualification: Maidens ineligible
- Weight: Quality handicap
- Purse: $200,000 (2025)

The Sandown Stakes is a registered Melbourne Racing Club Group 3 Thoroughbred open quality handicap horse race over a distance of 1500 metres, held at Sandown Racecourse, Melbourne, Australia in September.

== History ==
In 2013 the race was run at Caulfield Racecourse due to Sandown Racecourse being under construction.

The race was moved in 2021 to be run two months earlier than its previous scheduling on Zipping Classic day. It was moved to the race meeting held on AFL Grand Final day.

The 2026 race will be held on Saturday 28th November at Sandown Hillside Racecourse.

=== Name ===
- 1981–1987 - G.J. Coles Stakes
- 1988–1990 - Coles New World Stakes
- 1991 - Coles Supermarkets Stakes
- 1992–2007 - Sandown Stakes
- 2008–2009 - Race Tech Stakes
- 2010 - Zaidee's Rainbow Foundation Stakes
- 2011 - Alannah & Madeline Foundation Stakes
- 2012–2015 - Sandown Stakes
- 2016 - Yarramalong Racing Club Stakes
- 2017 - Chandler Macleod Recruitment Stakes

=== Grade ===
- 1981–1983 - Listed race
- 1984 onwards - Group 3

=== Distance ===
- 1981–2007 - 1400 metres
- 2008–2012 - 1500 metres
- 2013 - 1400 metres
- 2014 onwards - 1500 metres

=== Other venues ===
- 2013 Caulfield

== Winners ==
The following are past winners of the race.

- 2025 - Evaporate
- 2024 - Desert Lightning
- 2023 - Antino
- 2022 - Gentleman Roy
- 2021 - Elephant
- 2020 - Junipal
- 2019 - Gold Fields
- 2018 - Fifty Stars
- 2017 - Dollar For Dollar
- 2016 - Redkirk Warrior
- 2015 - Charmed Harmony
- 2014 - Pornichet
- 2013 - Mahisara
- 2012 - Mahisara
- 2011 - Under The Eiffel
- 2010 - Larrys Never Late
- 2009 - Nine Tales
- 2008 - Chasm
- 2007 - Gotta Have Heart
- 2006 - Swick
- 2005 - Titanic Jack
- 2004 - Amtrak
- 2003 - Chong Tong
- 2002 - Salgado
- 2001 - Little Dozer
- 2000 - Normal Practice
- 1999 - Buster Jones
- 1998 - Any Rhythm
- 1997 - Cut Up Rough
- 1996 - Wavertree
- 1995 - Mamzelle Pedrille
- 1994 - Another Victor
- 1993 - Monsieur
- 1992 - Minyama
- 1991 - Wrap Around
- 1990 - Procol Harum
- 1989 - Marabous Phantom
- 1988 - Rendoo
- 1987 - Luther's Luck
- 1986 - New Atlantis
- 1985 - Jurisdiction
- 1984 - Mr Ironclad
- 1983 - Vivacite
- 1982 - Showmeran
- 1981 - Tower Belle

== See also ==
- Sandown Guineas
- Summoned Stakes
- Thousand Guineas Prelude
- Underwood Stakes
- Zipping Classic
- List of Australian Group races
- Group races
