= Warning (Australian horse) =

Australian thoroughbred racehorse

- Sire: Declaration of War
- Grandsire: War Front
- Dam: Livia
- Damsire: Galileo
- Sex: Gelding
- Foaled: 30 September 2016
- Country: Australia
- Colour: Chestnut
- Breeder: The Toorak Thoroughbred Breeding Trust
- Owner: Bromfield Park Pty Ltd et al.
- Trainer: Anthony & Sam Freedman
- Record: 47: 5–3–3
- Earnings: A$ 2,452,350

Major wins
- Victoria Derby (2019); Chairman's Handicap (2021); AJC St Leger (2021); VRC Queen Elizabeth Stakes (2021)

Warning (foaled 30 September 2016) is a Group 1 winning Australian bred thoroughbred racehorse who is most notable for winning the 2019 Victoria Derby.

== Background ==
Warning was purchased for A$ 65,000 at the 2018 Magic Millions Adelaide Yearling Sale.

== Racing career ==
=== 2018/19: two-year-old season ===
Warning made his race debut on the 23 April 2019 at Ballarat Racecourse and finished in 7th placing. His only other start as a two-year-old was at Bendigo over 1,400 metres finishing in 4th place.

=== 2019/20: three-year-old season ===
Warning returned to racing four months later at Sandown over a distance of 1,400 metres finishing in 4th place. After finishing unplaced at his next start at Sale, Warning contested his first stakes race on the 5 October 2019 in the Listed Super Impose Stakes at Flemington. Ridden by Martin Harley at the odds of 15/1, Warning won the race over 1,800 metres by two lengths.

After finishing second in the Norman Robinson Stakes at Caulfield, Warning then started the third favourite at $9.50 at his next start in the Victoria Derby. Ridden by Damien Oliver in wet conditions, Warning settled in 4th position during the run and hit the front with 250 metres to go and extended his lead to win by over three lengths. The win was jockey Oliver's sixth Victorian Derby success.

Warning returned to racing on the 22 February 2020 in the Hobartville Stakes at Rosehill where he finished in 7th place. A further two unplaced runs followed in both the Randwick Guineas and Rosehill Guineas. Warning then contested the Australian Derby at Randwick. Starting the 4/1 second favourite, Warning finished in sixth placing beaten 9 lengths by Quick Thinker. Jockey Tommy Berry said after the race the horse was “gone at the half mile”.

Warning then contested the Chairman's Stakes at Morphettville where he finished in third placing, followed by another third placing in the South Australian Derby behind winner Russian Camelot.

=== 2020/21: four-year-old season ===
After an 18 week break between races, Warning returned in the Makybe Diva Stakes on the 12 September 2020 at Flemington. After settling midfield at the odds of 90/1, he worked to the line steadily to run in 7th position.

After unplaced runs in the Turnbull Stakes and Caulfield Cup, Warning took part in the 2020 Melbourne Cup. Starting at odds of 40/1 he settled midfield and battled on gamely without threatening, eventually beaten 6.8 lengths by Twilight Payment. Jockey Luke Currie said after the race, "He couldn't quicken as well as some of those better ones."

After finishing second last in the 2021 Australian Cup and in fifth placing in a 1,700 metre Handicap race at Flemington, Warning contested the 2021 Chairman's Handicap at Doomben. After settling well back he stormed home to win in the last stride.
