= Stylish Century =

Australian-bred Thoroughbred racehorse

- Sire: Double Century (AUS)
- Grandsire: Century (AUS)
- Dam: Stylish (AUS)
- Damsire: Forex (GB)
- Sex: Stallion
- Foaled: 1986
- Country: Australia
- Colour: Brown
- Owner: Mr R Mrs B & Miss K Monaghan
- Trainer: N Doyle/ B Cummings /B Mitchell /R Gill /R Monaghan
- Record: 58:11-8-7
- Earnings: A$2,510,250

Major wins
- Spring Champion Stakes (1989); Victoria Derby (1989); Queen Elizabeth Stakes (1991)

Stylish Century was a notable Australian thoroughbred racehorse.

A son of Double Century from the Forex mare Stylish, he was foaled in 1986 and was trained by a number of trainers throughout his career, including Bart Cummings for a short time.

Known for his bold, front-running style, he won quality races like the 1989 AJC Spring Champion Stakes, VRC Victoria Derby, and 1991 AJC Queen Elizabeth Stakes. As a 3-year old, he also ran a close second to Almaarad in the 1989 MVRC W.S. Cox Plate.

He ran in the 1990 Japan Cup, won by David Hayes' Better Loosen Up. Stylish Century broke through the barrier and bolted prior to the race and was timed at a near-world record pace for a 1000m before being vetted and declared fit to run.

Retired to stud, he had moderate success with his best performer being Buster Jones, winner of the 1999 VATC Sandown Stakes.

He died in 2003 following a spider bite.

== Race record ==
58 starts - 11 wins, 8 seconds, 7 third

== Prizemoney ==
A$2,510,520

=== Major wins ===
Stylish Century won the following major races:

- 1989 AJC Spring Champion Stakes – (2000m)
- 1989 VRC Victoria Derby – (2400m)
- 1990 VATC Caulfield Autumn Classic – (1800m)
- 1991 AJC Queen Elizabeth Stakes – (2000m)
- 1991 VATC Sandown Cup – (2400m)
