= Spring Racing Carnival =

Annual horse racing series in Melbourne, Victoria, Australia

The Spring Racing Carnival is the name of an Australian Thoroughbred horse racing series held annually in Melbourne during October and November.

== The Carnival and its status in the wider community ==
Although racing in Australia is held every day except Good Friday and Christmas Day, the Group One races in Melbourne are held almost exclusively throughout the carnival, which is traditionally placed between the football and cricket seasons. During the winter (where football is dominant), and summer (where cricket is dominant), racing takes a 'back seat' position in relation to the cricket or football in terms of media coverage and attendances. However, in spring and autumn, the mass media turns its attention to the racing. There is also an Autumn Racing Carnival, a time when Group One races are also held.

== Economic impact ==
The Spring Racing Carnival is a major contributor to the Victorian economy. According to a study conducted by market research company IER, the 2022 Spring Racing Carnival was estimated to have delivered $422.1 million in gross economic benefit to Victoria in 2022, with the Spring Racing Carnival contributing more than $3.6 billion in gross economic benefit to Victoria in the past decade, almost $1 billion more than the Australian Open tennis reported for the same period.

The 2017 Spring Racing Carnival injected $444.5 million into the Victorian economy, and created jobs for more than 20,000 staff and contractors, in addition to providing boosts to the retail and hospitality sectors.

The 2018 Spring Racing Carnival provided an economic return to the state of $447.6 million, with the event also directly employing more than 21,000 staff and contractors who worked for more than 800 companies in the lead-up and during the event.

The 2019 Spring Racing Carnival has been credited with injecting US$196.2 million directly into the Victorian economy; when considering total spending by all attendees at the Spring Racing Carnival, the event generated a gross economic benefit of US$521.8 million.

== Attendance ==
Year	Derby Day	Melbourne Cup	Oaks	Stakes	Melbourne Cup Carnival Total	Caulfield Cup	Cox Plate
2025	86,343	84,373	51,239	65,012	286,746	28,000	22,000
2024	81,612	91,168	50,873	62,022	285,675	25,676	20,000
2023	73,056	84,492	46,596	58,021	262,165	25,121	21,021
2022	71,327	73,816	45,046	54,019	244,208	24,289	19,000
2021	5,000	10,000	10,000	10,000	35,000	0	0
2020	0	0	0	0	0	0	0
2019	80,214	81,408	57,296	57,268	276,186	28,000	24,648
2018	91,194	83,471	61,355	67,567	303,587	30,000	38,035
2017	87,526	90,536	63,673	68,873	310,608	30,000	32,617
2016	90,136	97,479	60,888	70,351	318,854		26,000
2015	85,943	101,015	57,560	68,711	313,229	30,000	27,620
2014	90,244	100,794	64,430	70,051	325,519	32,000	28,216
2013	95,223	104,169	66,757	65,047	331,196	33,056	30,986
2012	98,823	106,162	71,825	74,546	351,356	35,500	
2011	92,336	105,979	71,659	85,112	355,086	30,097	30,000
2010	90,361	110,223	75,088	77,506	353,178	23,697	31,546
2009	108,178	102,161	80,112	78,478	368,929	43,210	31,000
2008	117,776	107,280	89,338	81,652	396,046	51,328	34,000
2007	115,705	102,411	95,230	84,067	397,413	48,529	34,561
2006	129,089	106,691	104,131	78,158	418,069	47,551	34,256
2005	115,660	106,479	100,263	61,382	383,784	52,000	44,189
2004	115,542	98,161	110,677	45,734	370,114	51,015	32,187
2003	97,059	122,736	101,179	55,793	376,767	46,873	30,109
2002	101,898	102,533	103,269	47,593	355,293		
2001	93,029	92,477	101,201	42,760	329,467		
2000	92,581	121,015	96,406	42,311	352,313		
1999	76,514	104,028	83,870	31,728	296,140		
1998	75,805	100,607	77,301	31,249	284,962		
1997	64,528	94,143	75,482	26,357	260,510		
1996	64,099	90,149	67,086	25,736	247,070		
1995	60,404	74,843	62,388	25,318	222,953		
1994	54,467	81,650	50,176	22,624	208,917		
1993	49,029	74,766	46,744	22,162	192,701		
1992	45,729	86,206	50,925	21,495	204,355		
1991	46,781	94,632	54,023	22,587	218,023		
1990	47,497	92,536	50,196	21,414	211,643		
1989	47,226	96,722	51,673	23,712	219,333		
1988	44,848	93,440	48,490	23,341	210,119		
1987	41,878	81,012	45,329	22,196	190,415		
1986	42,824	87,129	42,649	21,051	193,653		
1985	40,522	79,126	39,051	18,675	177,374		
1984	39,771	82,740	40,812	19,739	183,062		
1983	40,017	80,776	38,633	22,162	181,588		
1982	42,519	91,152	37,028	19,725	190,424		
1981	39,729	87,641	37,353	24,378	189,101		
1980	38,032	101,261	37,098	25,262	201,653		

== Sweeps ==
The carnival, and particularly the Melbourne Cup attracts the interest of many people otherwise uninterested in horse racing, and special forms of very low-stake gambling are often used for this event. One common form for groups such as office staff is the "sweep", where each participant adds a small fee to a "pot" and draws the name of a horse like a raffle. Prize money is distributed to the person who draws the winning horse (occasionally smaller prizes are awarded to placegetters and the last-placing horse). A more complex and high-stakes form of the sweep is the "Calcutta", often held as a fundraising event for community organisations, which begins as in the sweep (though usually with a much higher initial stake), but which allows ticket holders to trade their tickets through an auction system.

== Special guests ==
For the fashion part of the Spring Racing Carnival many special guests over the years have come to the races. Paris Hilton, Nicky Hilton, Carson Kressley, Eva Longoria, Sarah Jessica Parker, Kim Cattrall, Naomi Campbell, Nicole Kidman, Gigi Hadid and Hilary Swank.

== Carnival race meetings ==
The Spring Racing Carnival is made up of meetings held by the metropolitan clubs, where Group One races take place, and also at Geelong and Bendigo. With numerous group races during August and September at metropolitan tracks Flemington, Caulfield and Moonee Valley, the Spring Racing Carnival officially starts on the Group 1 Turnbull Stakes Day at Flemington, one week after the AFL Grand Final. The Spring Racing Carnival officially ends on the final day of the carnival at Sandown in mid-November.

=== Caulfield Carnival ===
The Melbourne Racing Club holds three race meetings at Caulfield Racecourse, each with major Group one races.

- The Caulfield Guineas, Caulfield Thousand Guineas and Caulfield Stakes is held on the Saturday three weeks before the Victoria Derby. Other group races are held on this day, including the Toorak Handicap and Herbert Power Stakes.
- The Ladies Day Vase and Blue Sapphire Stakes are held on the Wednesday following the Saturday Caulfield Guineas.
- The Caulfield Cup is held on the Saturday on the weekend following the Guineas meeting.

=== Geelong Carnival ===
The Geelong Racing Club hosts its Group 3 Geelong Cup at the Geelong Racecourse on the Wednesday between the Caulfield Cup and Cox Plate. The meeting also has a couple of Listed races, The 3YO Geelong Classic and The Rosemont Stud Stakes. The day is a public holiday in Geelong's metropolitan area.

=== Moonee Valley Carnival ===
The Moonee Valley Racing Club holds a two-day carnival at the Moonee Valley Racecourse. The Manikato Stakes is held on the Friday night following the Caulfield Cup. The club's highlight is the Weight for Age Cox Plate race held on the next day with a host of other Group races including the Moonee Valley Gold Cup, Crystal Mile and Moonee Valley Vase.

=== Bendigo Carnival ===
The Bendigo Jockey Club hosts its Group 3 Bendigo Cup on the Wednesday between the Cox Plate and the VRC Derby Day.

=== Melbourne Cup Carnival ===
The Victoria Racing Club's meetings attract the most attention from the media and the wider community.

- The Victoria Derby is held on the Saturday before the Melbourne Cup. It is a set-weights race for three-year-old horses. Other well known races on this day include the Cantala Stakes, Empire Rose Stakes and Hotham Handicap (the winner of this receiving a final spot in the Melbourne Cup field). Traditionally, the Melbourne Cup field is announced following the conclusion of the last race on this day.
- The Melbourne Cup handicap race is held on the first Tuesday in November, and is a public holiday in Melbourne, but the Cup is witnessed by those all around Australia as well as internationally.
- The VRC Oaks race is held on the Thursday following the Cup. It is a three-year-old fillies race, and traditionally the race meeting has been known as 'ladies' day'.
- The Mackinnon Stakes is held on the Saturday following the Oaks, and traditionally it has been known as 'family day'. Other notable races run on this day are the VRC Sprint Classic and VRC Queen Elizabeth Stakes.

=== Sandown Carnival ===
The Melbourne Racing Club holds the last official meeting of the Spring Racing Carnival at Sandown Racecourse. This day includes the Group 2 Sandown Guineas and the Group 2 Zipping Classic and occurs in mid November, one week after Mackinnon Stakes day.
