= Chairman's Handicap =

Chairman's Handicap may refer to:

- Chairman's Handicap (ATC)
- Chairman's Handicap (BRC)
