= Victoria Derby =

Annual horse race in Australia since 1855

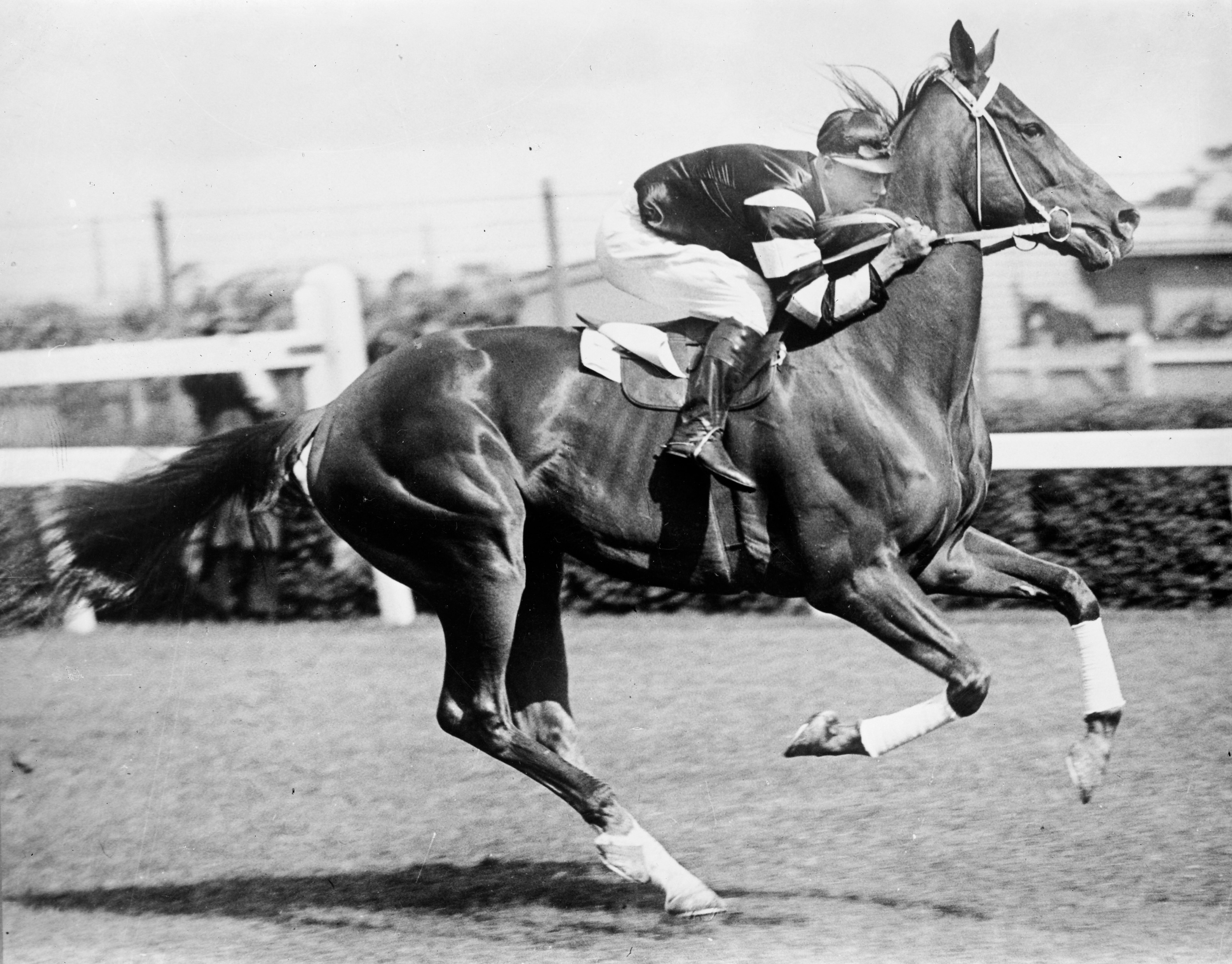
- Phar Lap 1929 winner – Jim Pike
- Class: Group 1
- Location: Flemington Racecourse; Melbourne, Australia
- Inaugurated: 1855; 171 years ago
- Race type: Thoroughbred - Flat racing
- Sponsor: Howden (2025 & 2026)
- Website: Victoria Racing Club

Race information
- Distance: 2,500 metres
- Surface: Turf
- Track: Left-handed
- Qualification: Three-year-olds
- Weight: Set weights Colts & geldings: 55 1/2kg Fillies: 53 1/2kg
- Purse: A$3,000,000 (2026)

The Victoria Derby, is a Victoria Racing Club Group 1 Thoroughbred horse race for three-year-olds held under Set Weights conditions over a distance of 2,500 metres at Flemington Racecourse, in Melbourne, Australia scheduled annually on the first day of the Melbourne Cup Carnival.

== History ==
Originally run at a distance of 1 1/2 miles, in 1972 it was changed to 2,400 metres to conform to the metric system. It was changed again in 1973 to its present distance of 2,500 metres.

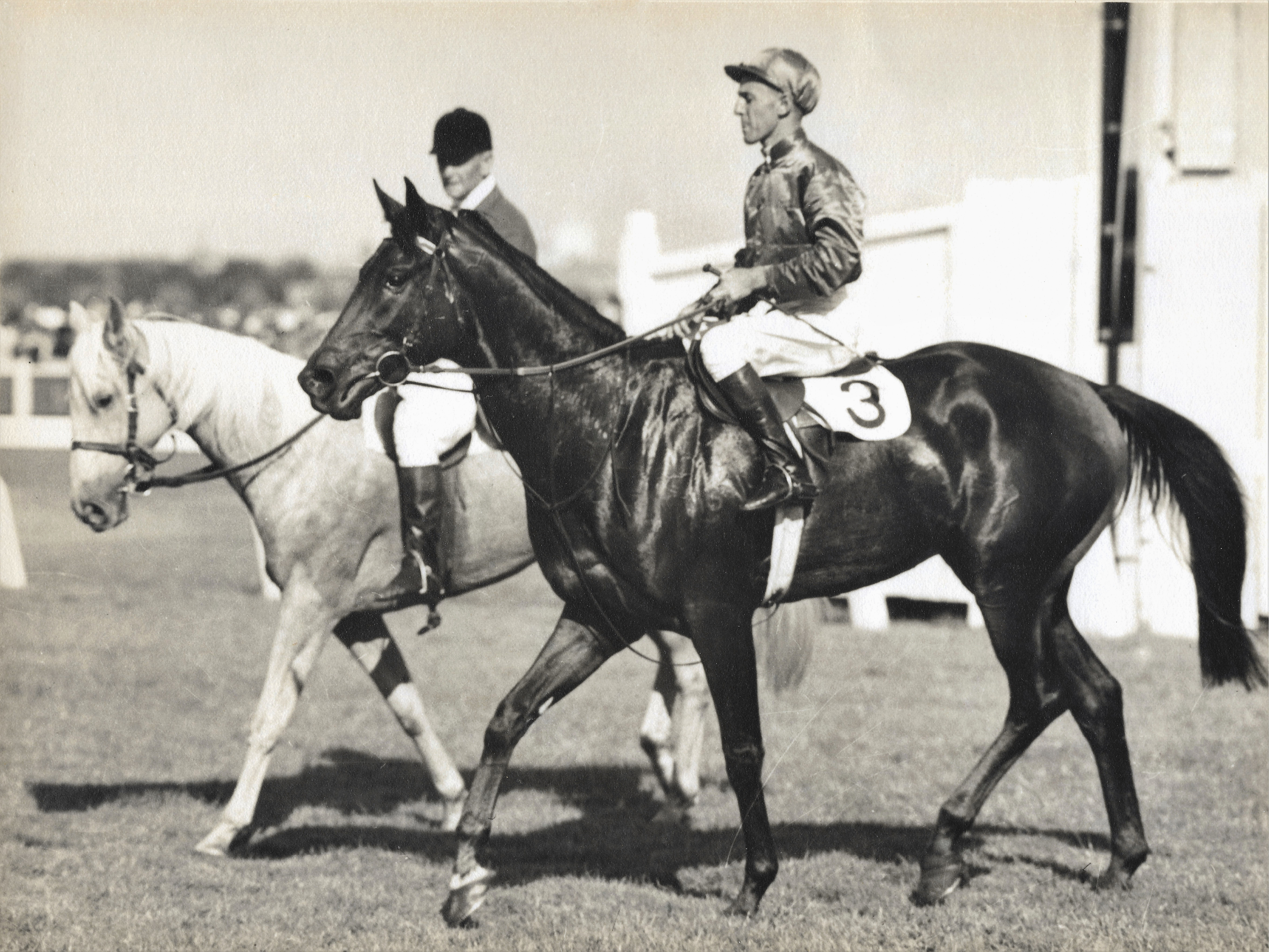
1949 winner – Delta

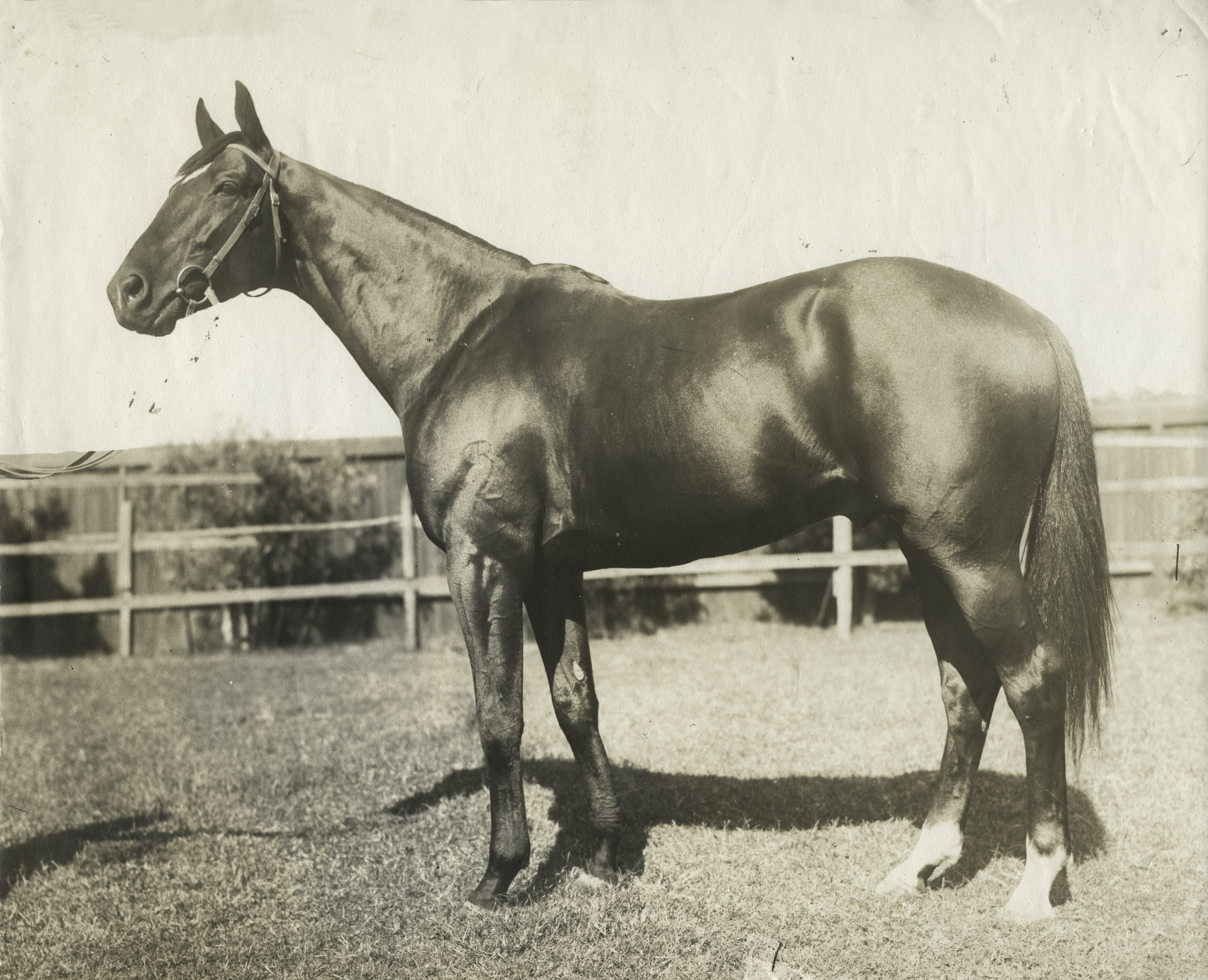
1906 winner – Poseidon

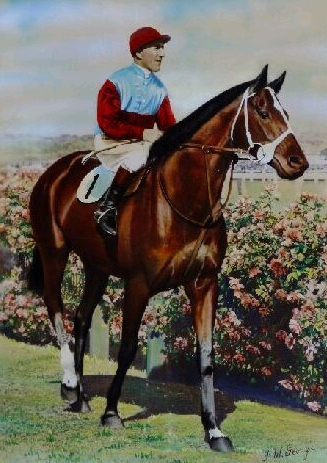
1940 winner – Lucrative

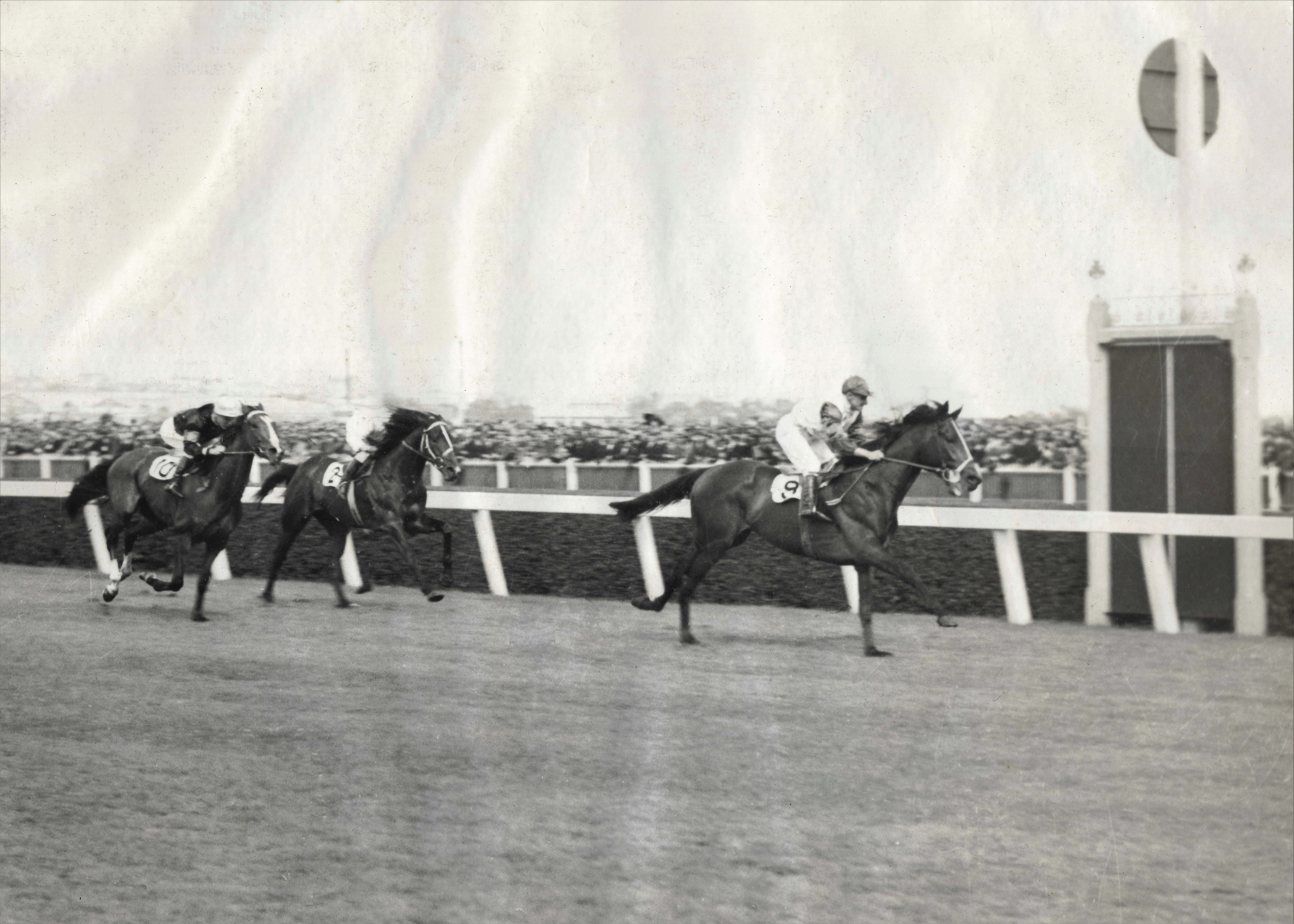
1936 winner – Talking

First run in 1855, the first three editions were won by fillies but the last time a filly won was in 1923 when Frances Tressady claimed victory. In its history, only one horse has ever won the Victoria Derby more than once. Fireworks accomplished the feat, winning back-to-back runnings in November 1867 and again in 1868 after a change of the race date to New Year's Day. Between 1931 and 1956 geldings were not permitted to compete.

Three horses have won their first race with a win in the Victoria Derby. In 1883, the New Zealand-bred horse Martini Henry won the Victoria Derby at his first start. Fire Oak in 1990, Redding in 1992 and Preferment in 2014 are the only other maidens to win the Victoria Derby.

In 2005, Clare Lindop became the first female jockey to ride in the Victoria Derby and became the first female to win in 2008. Gai Waterhouse became the first woman to train a winner when Nothin' Leica Dane won the 1995 running.

=== Distance ===
- 1855–1971 - 1 1/2 miles (~2400 metres)
- 1972 – 2400 metres
- 1973 onwards - 2500 metres

=== Grade ===
- 1855–1978 - Principal Race
- 1979 onwards - Group 1

=== 1933 and 1953 racebooks ===
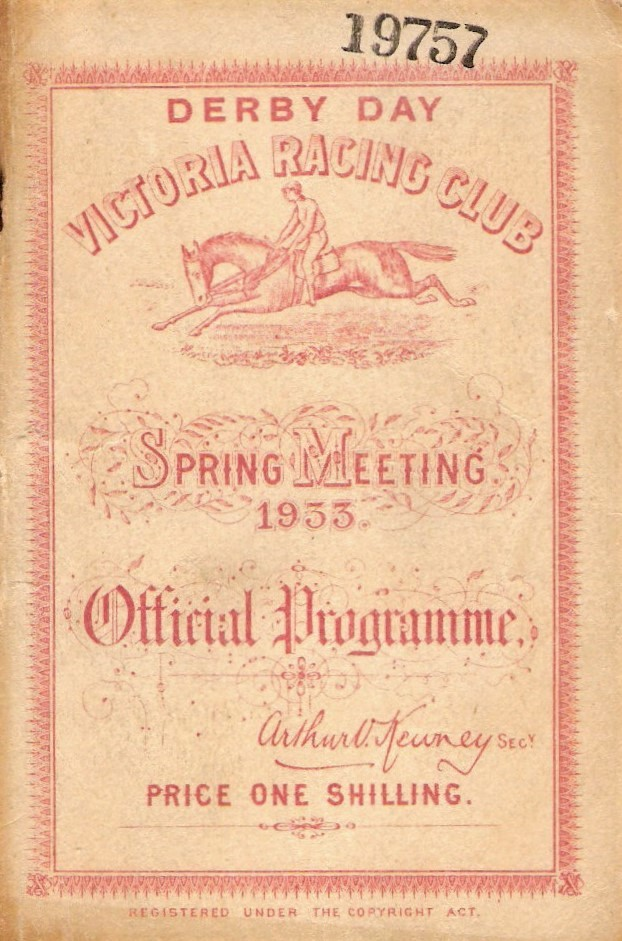
1933 VRC Derby racebook front cover

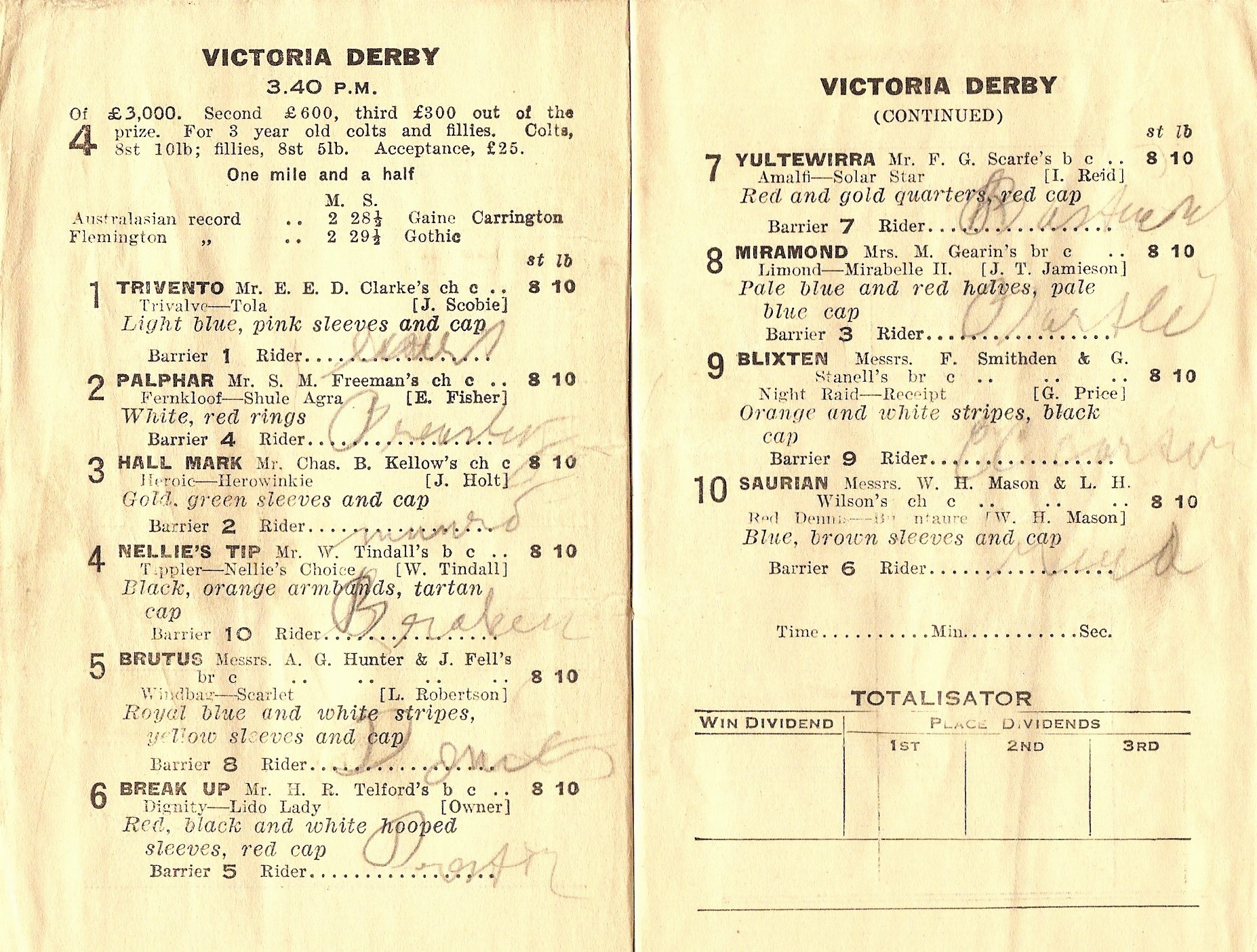
1933 VRC Derby starters and results showing the winner, Hall Mark

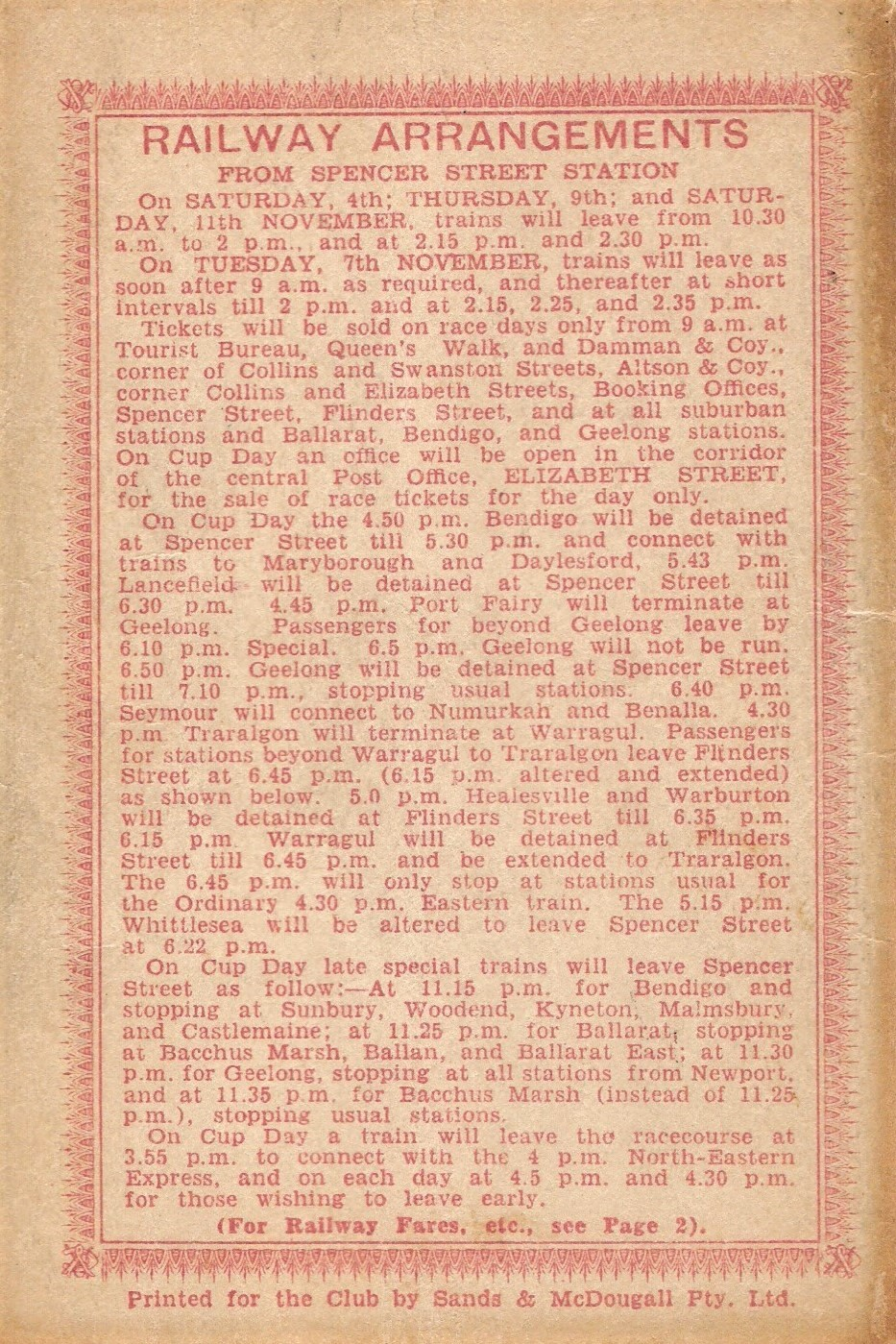
Back cover showing train timetables

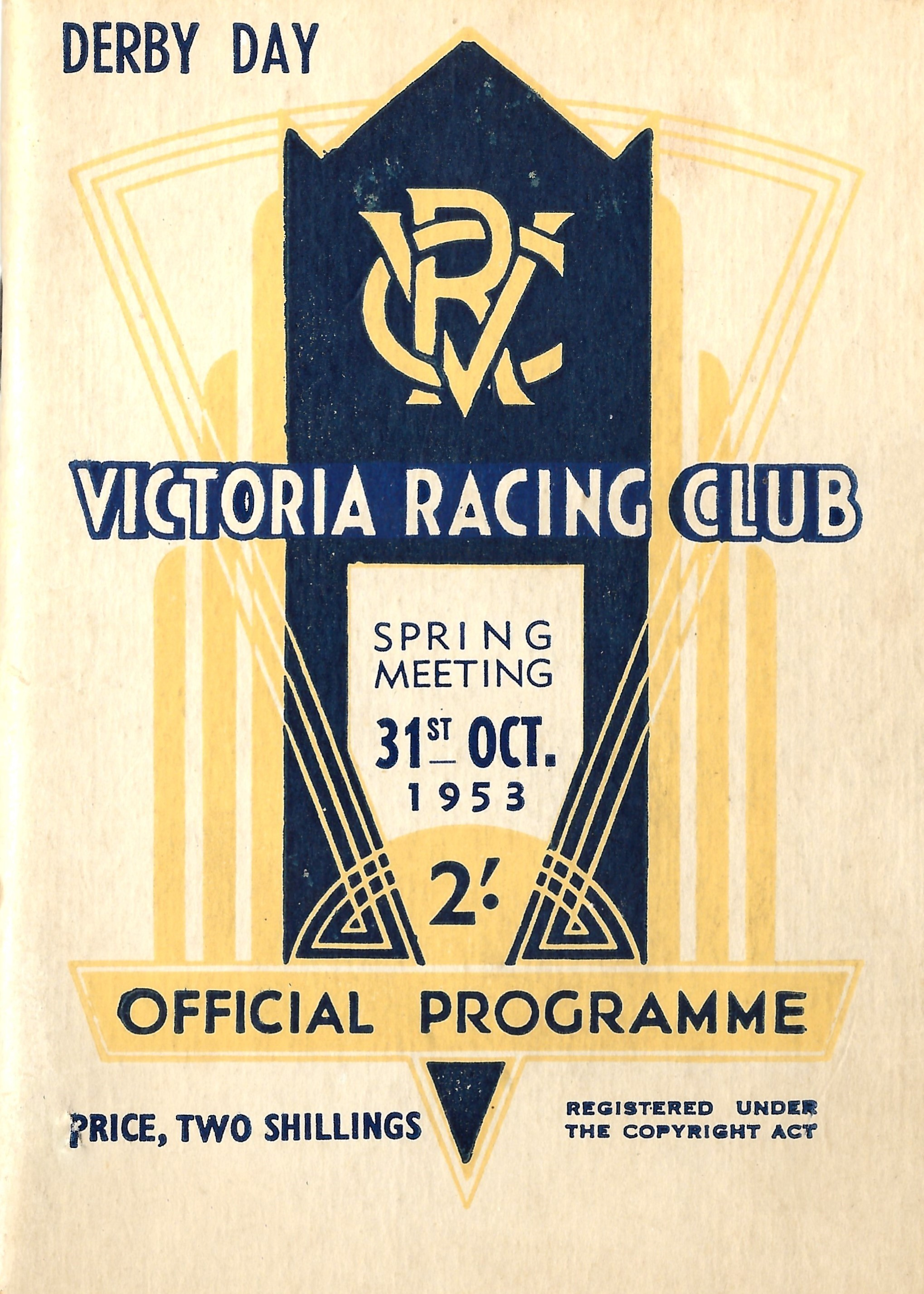
1953 VRC Derby racebook front cover

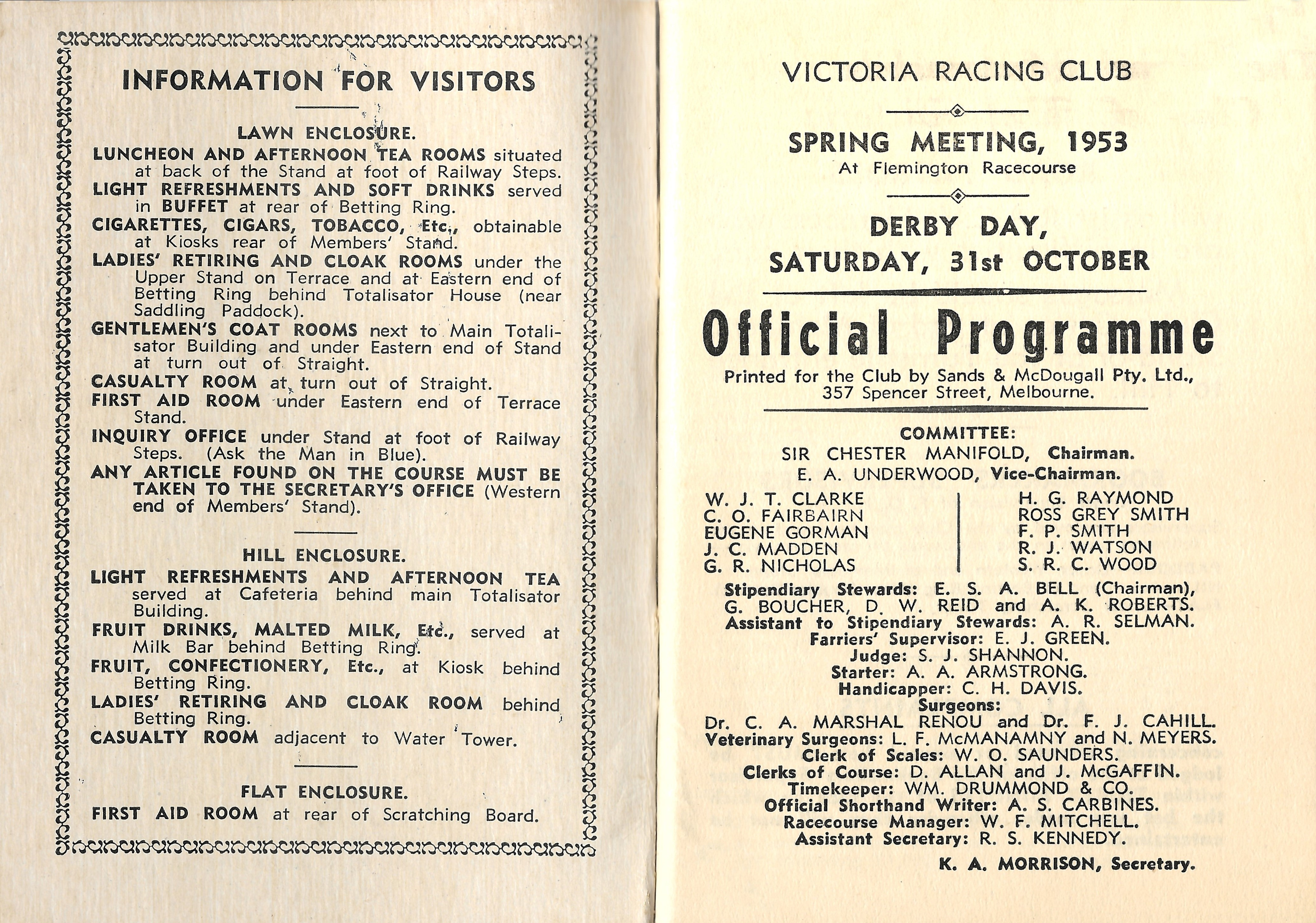
1953 VRC Derby raceday officials

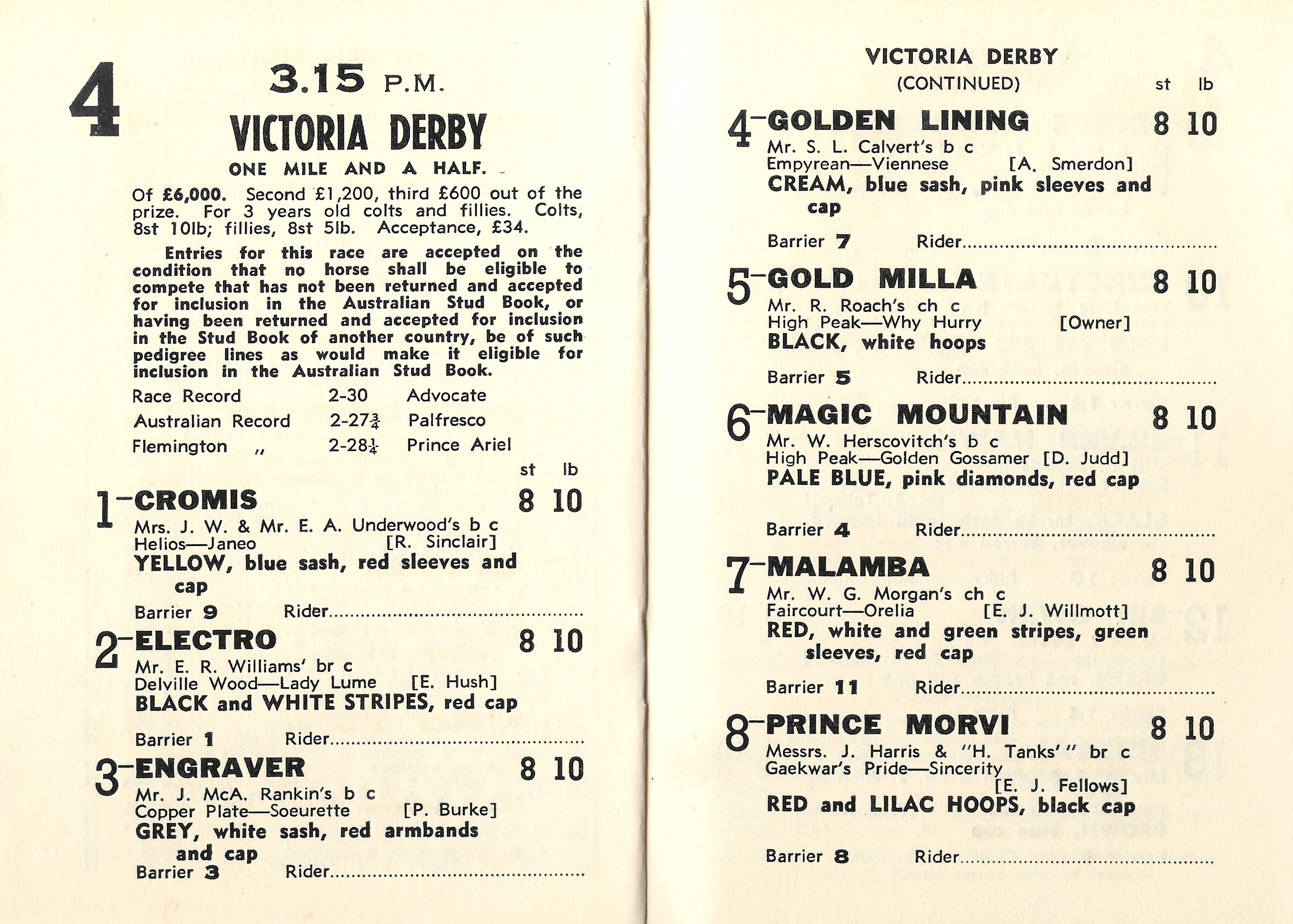
1953 VRC Derby showing the winner, Prince Morvi

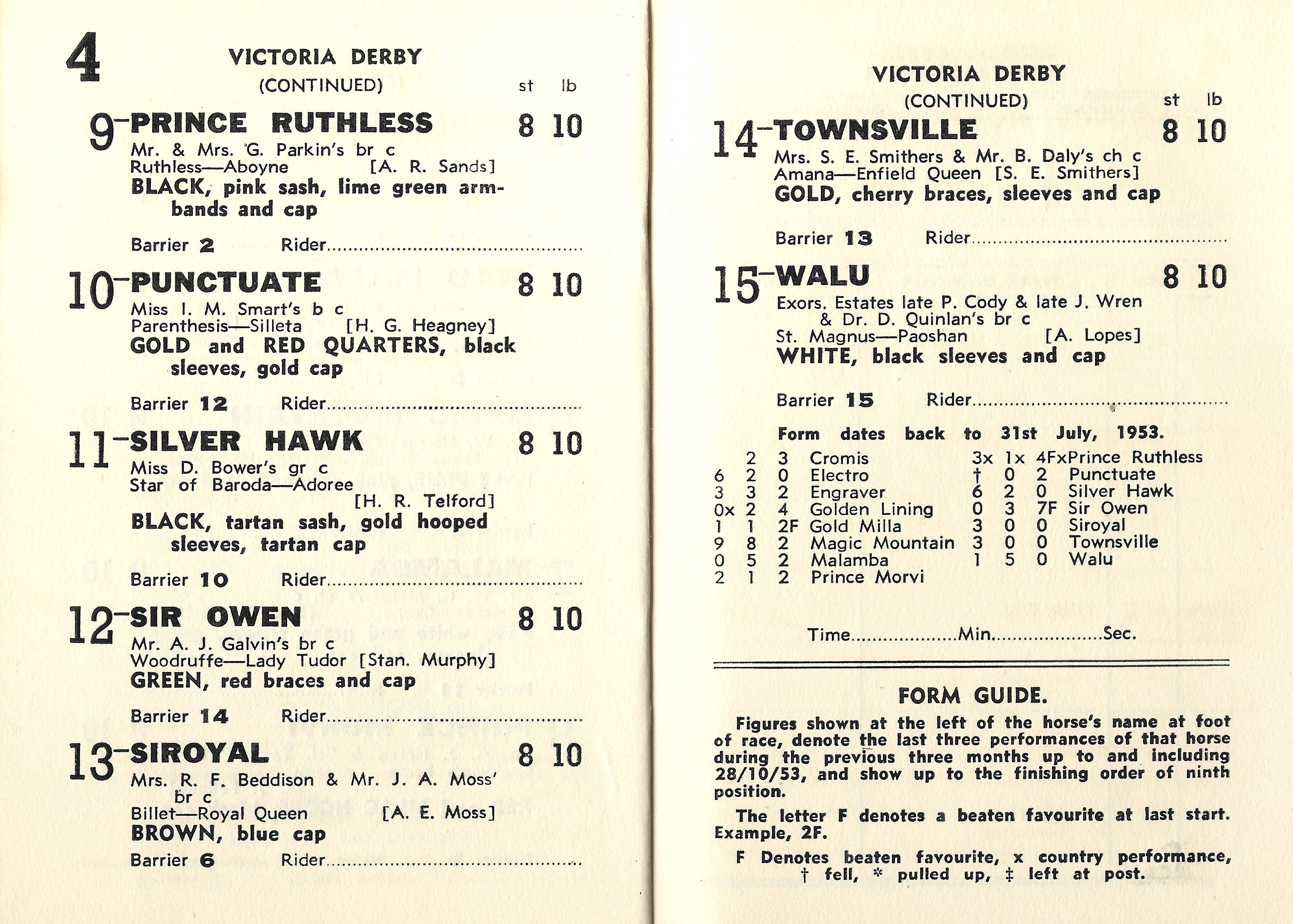
1953 VRC Derby starters and results

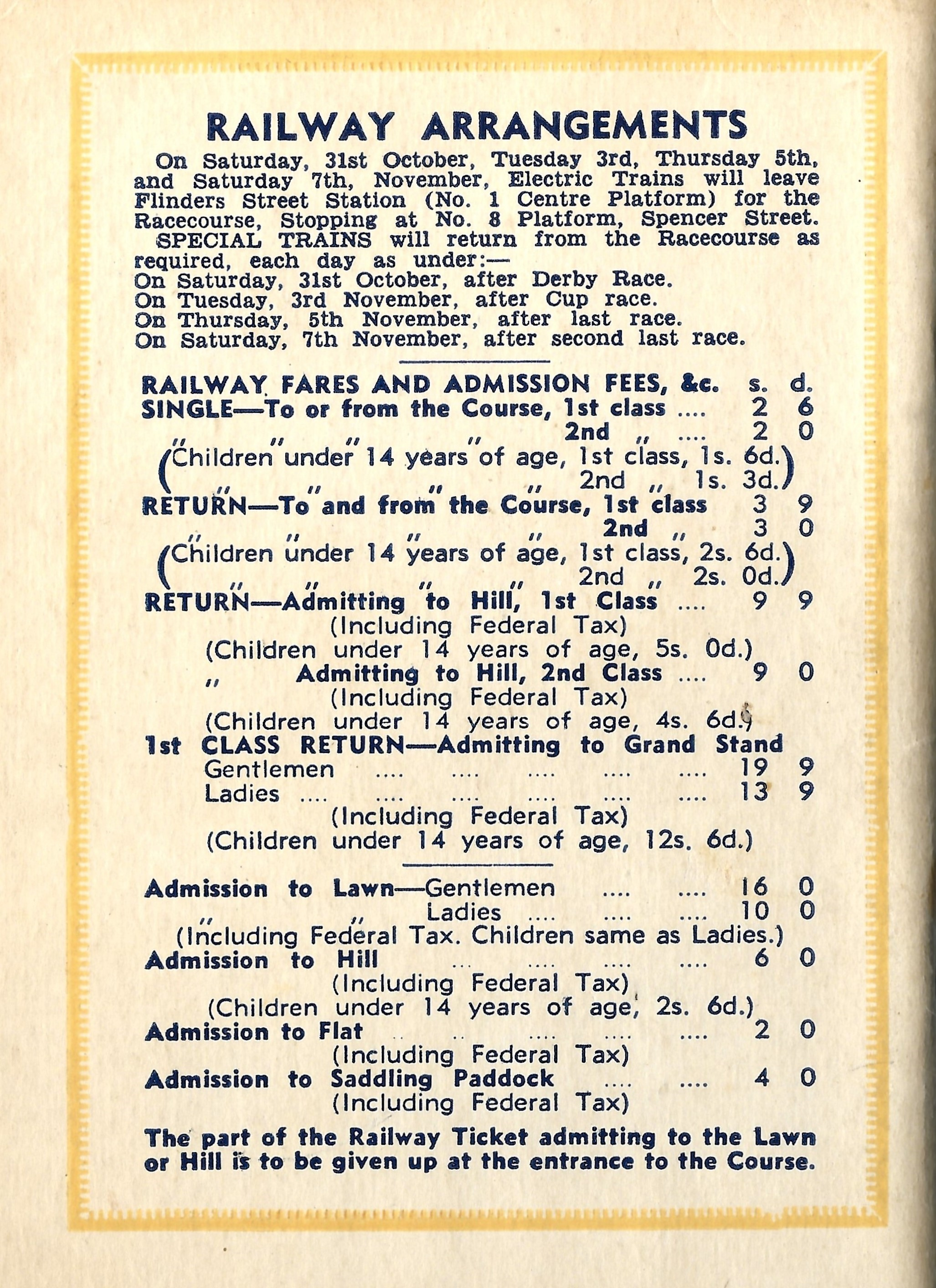
Back cover showing railway and admission charges

=== 1954 racebook ===
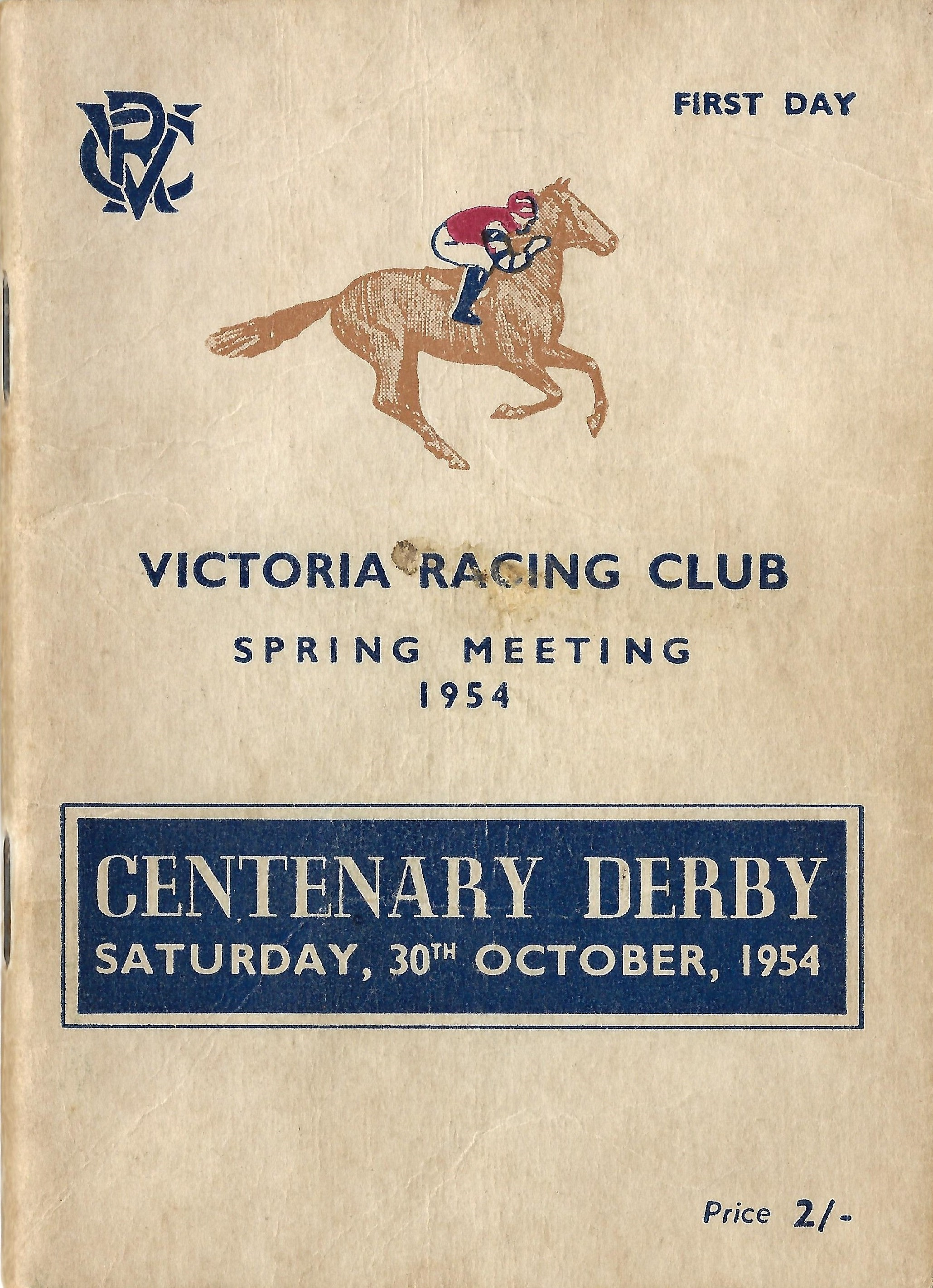
1954 VRC Derby racebook front cover

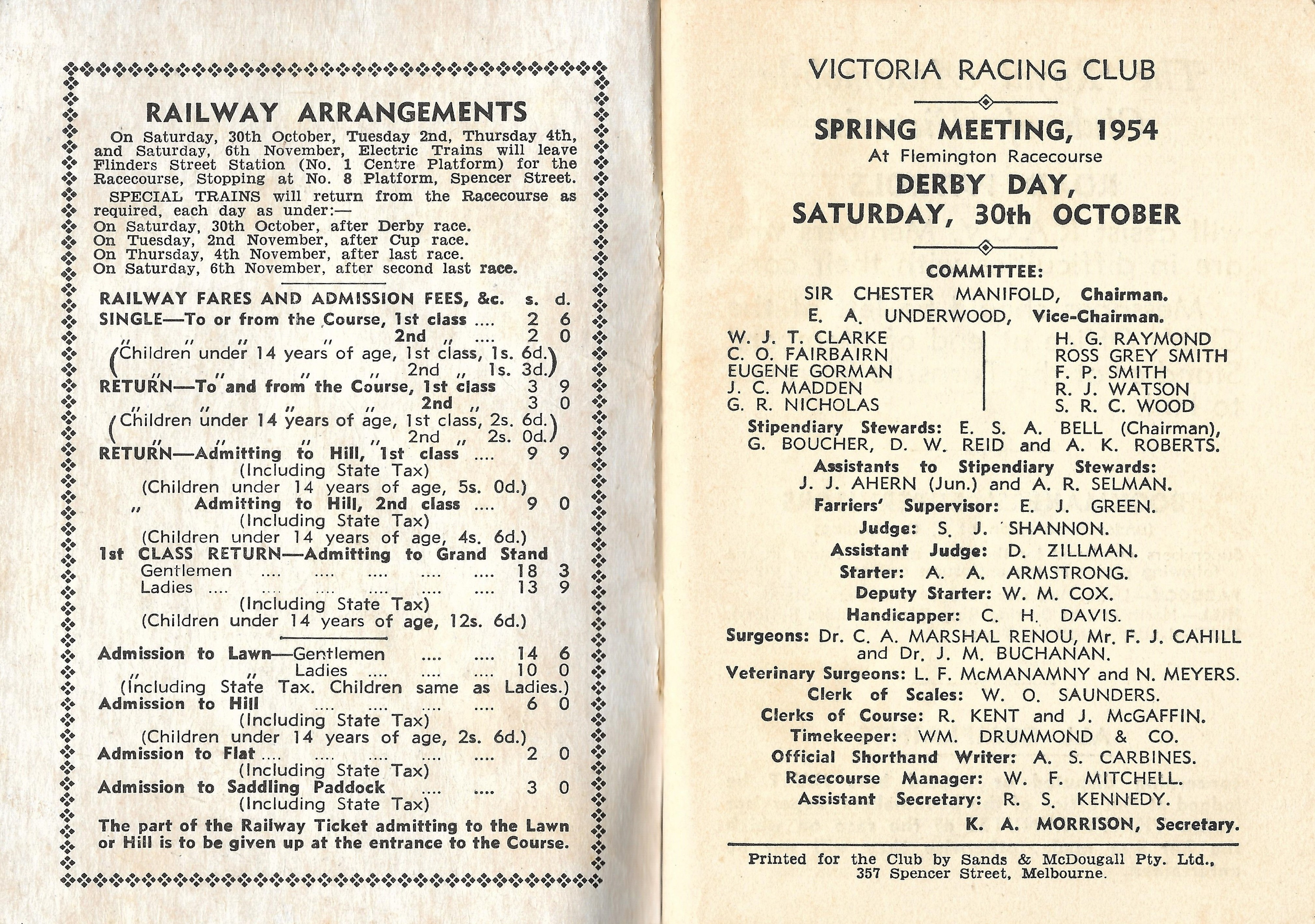
1954 VRC Derby raceday officials

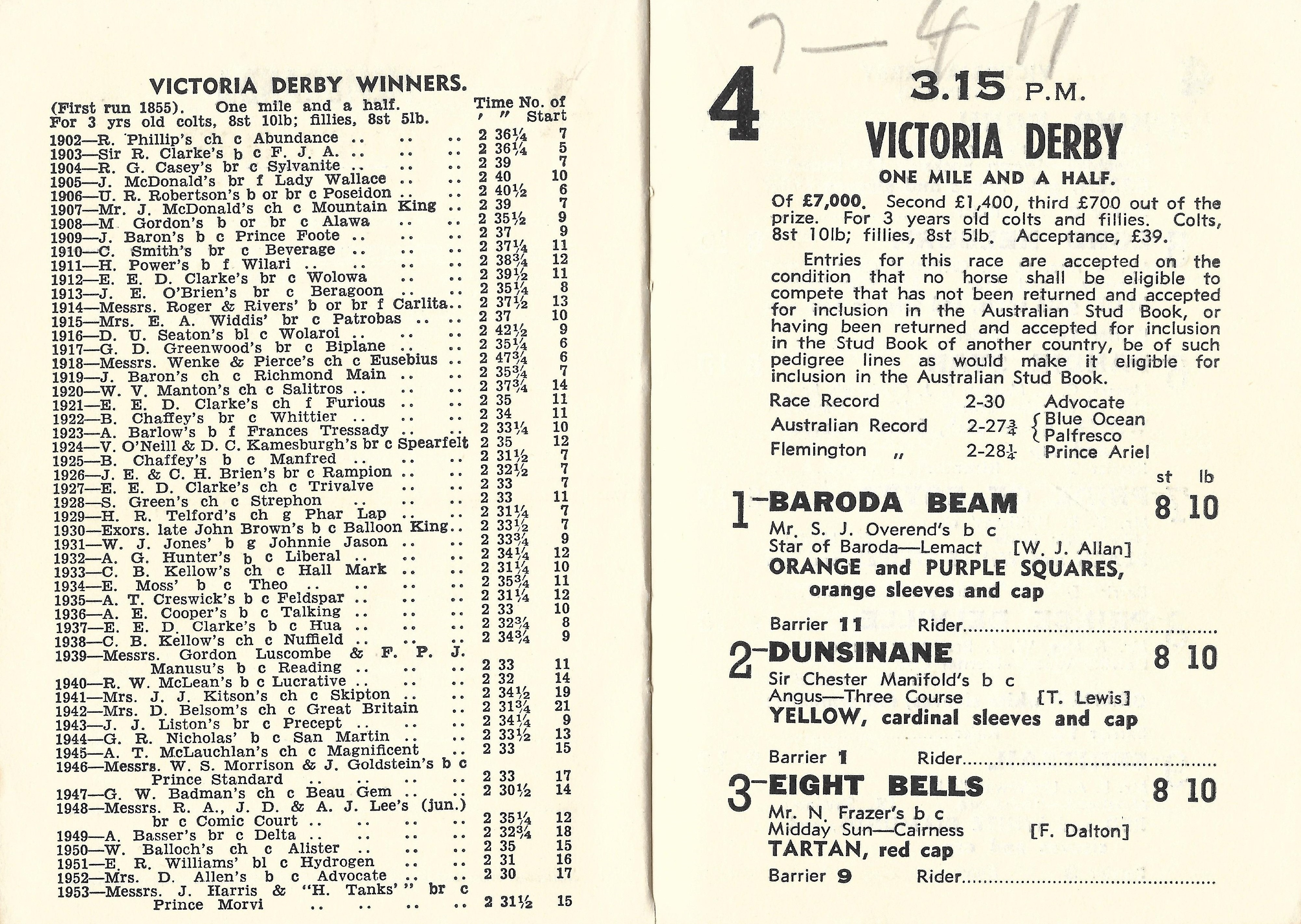
1954 VRC Derby starters and results

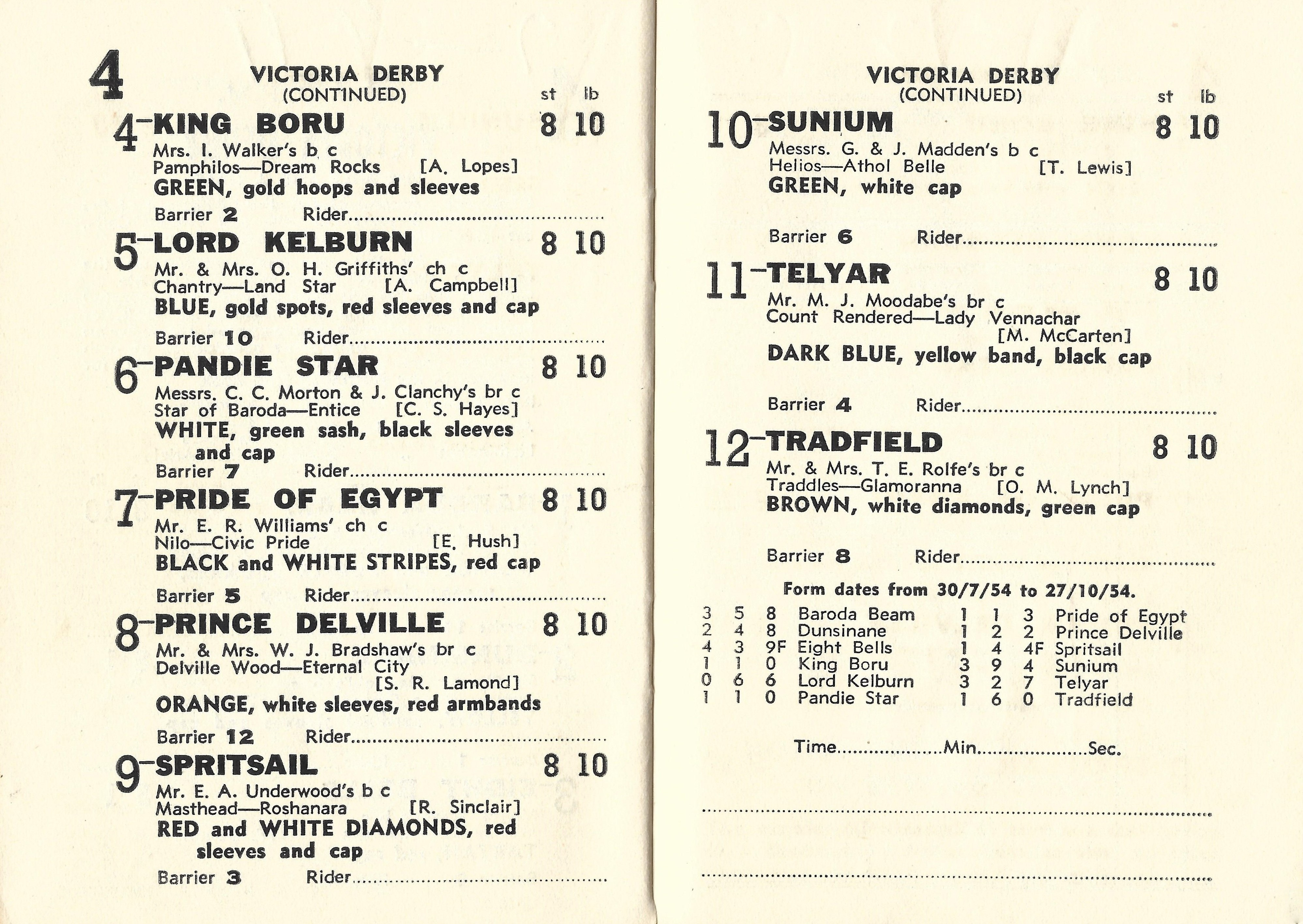
1954 VRC Derby starters and results showing the winner, Pride of Egypt

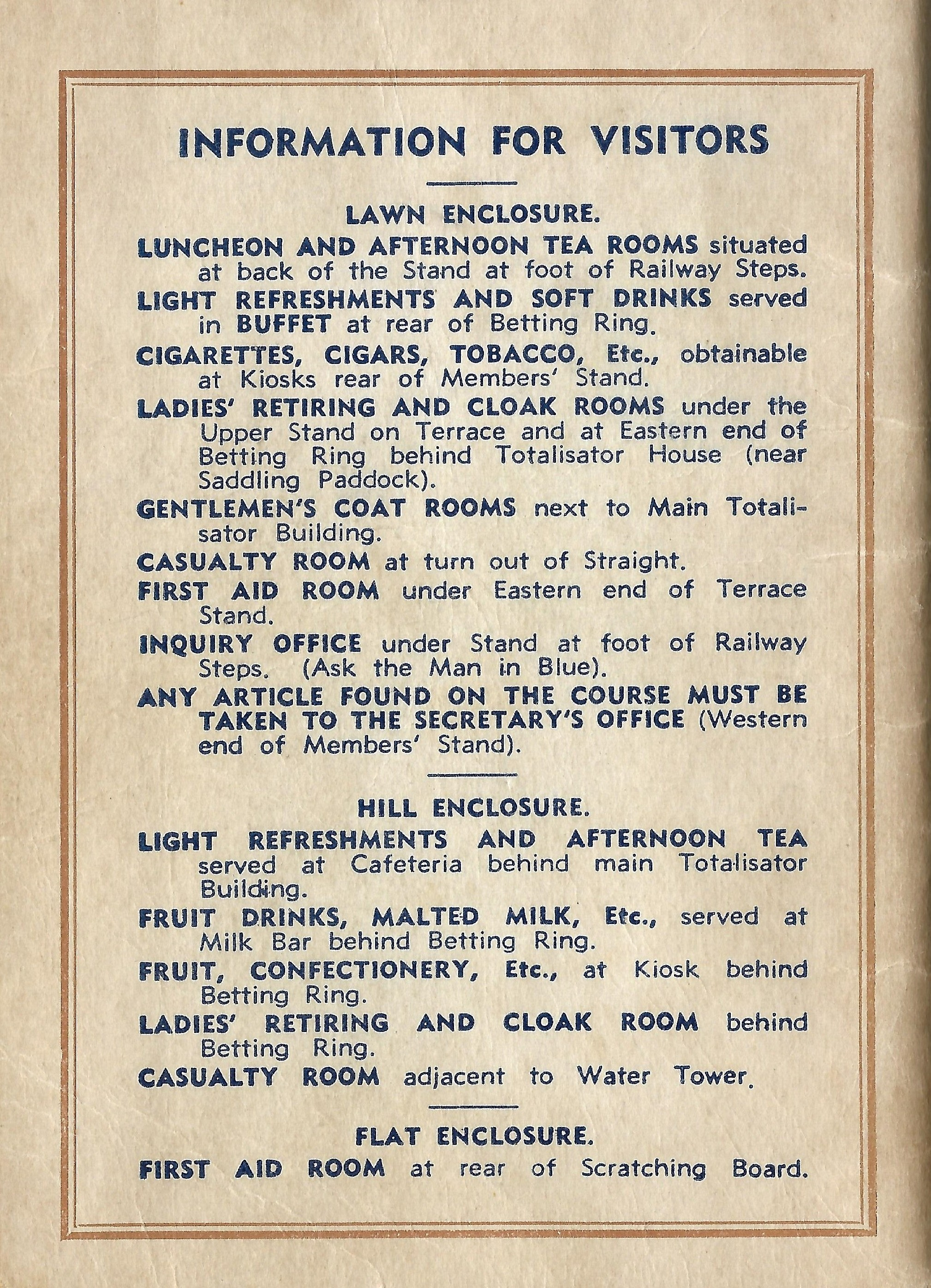
Back cover showing enclosure information for visitors

=== Gallery of noted winners ===
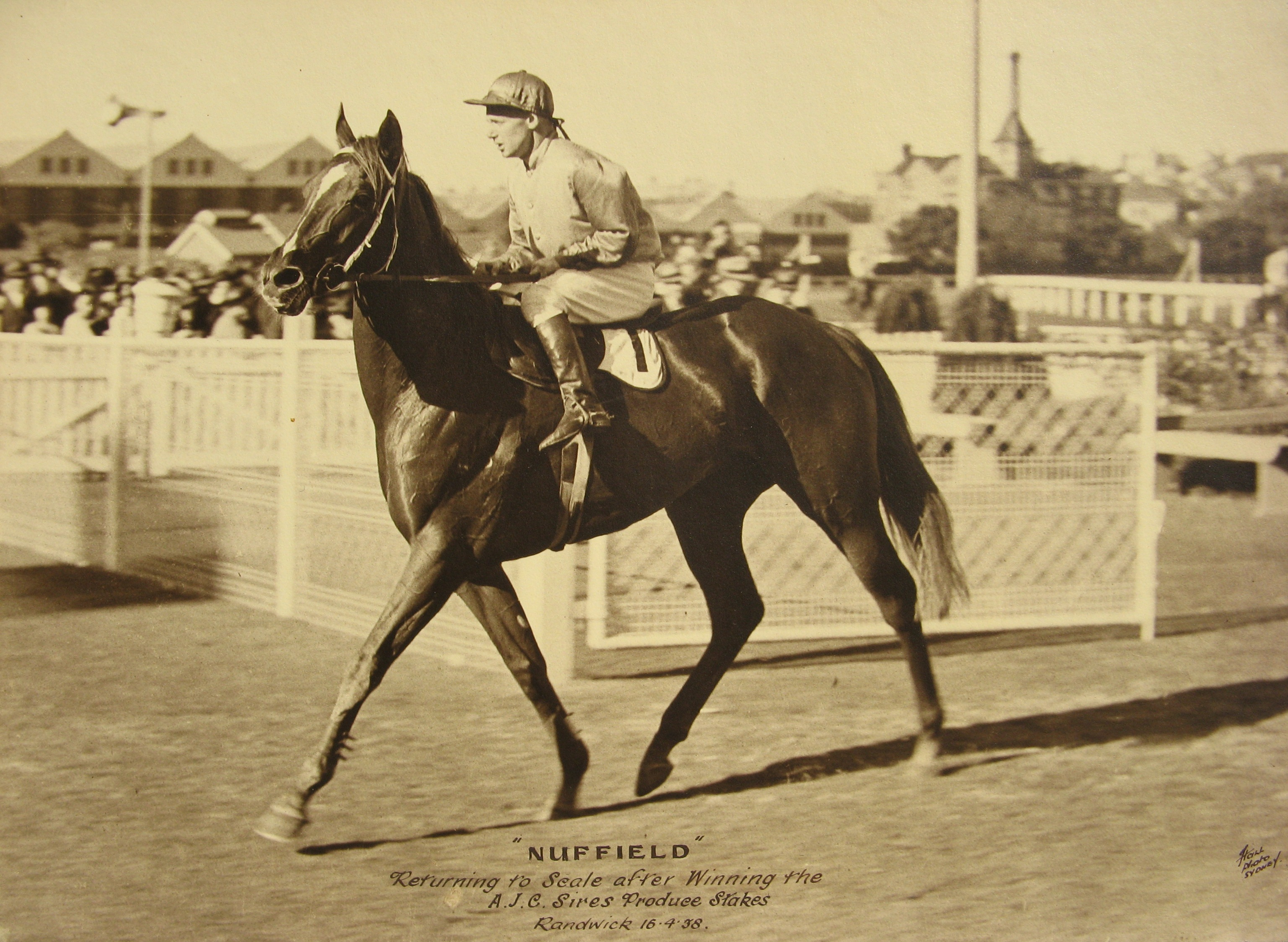
1938 winner – Nuffield

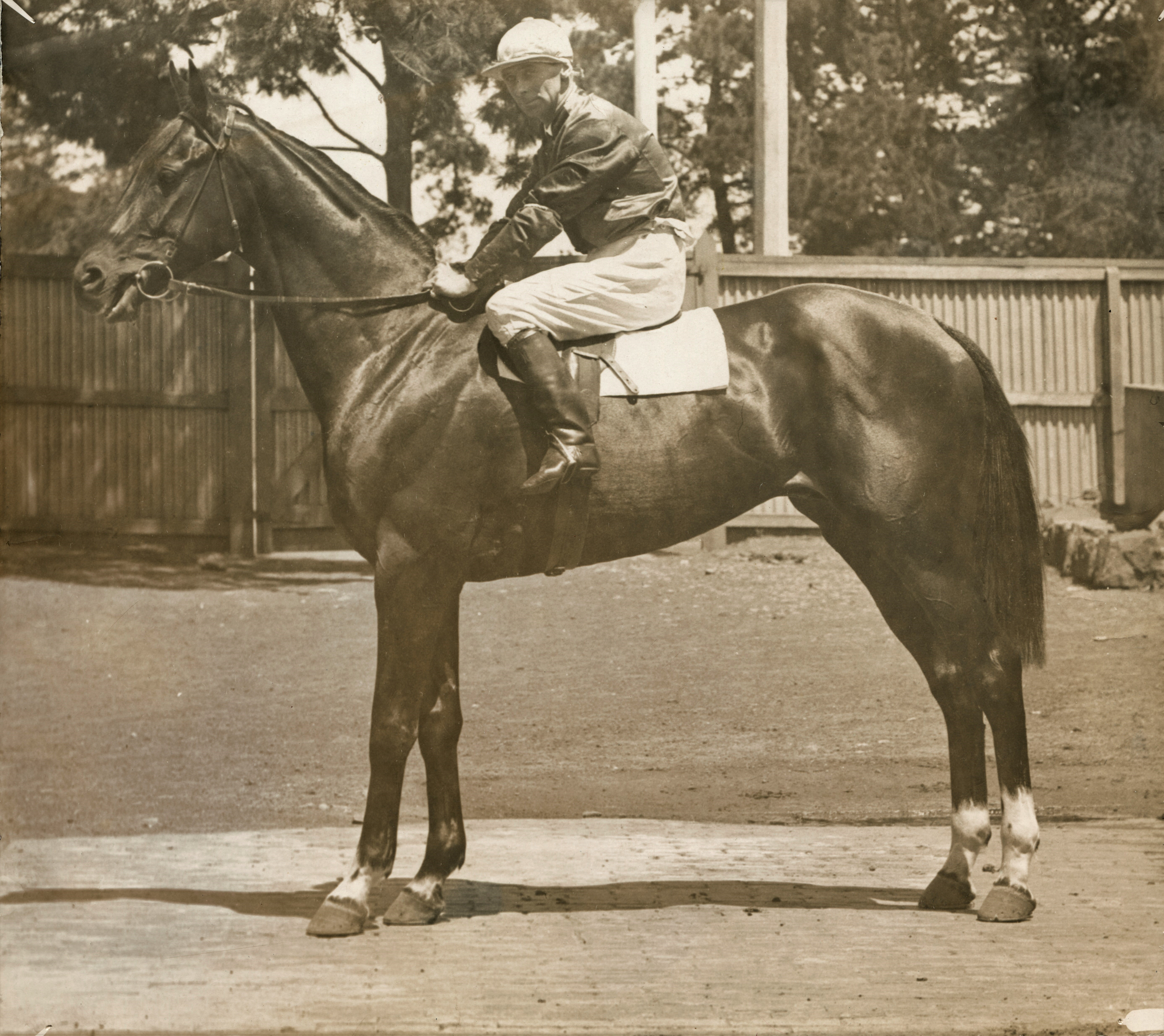
1917 winner – Biplane

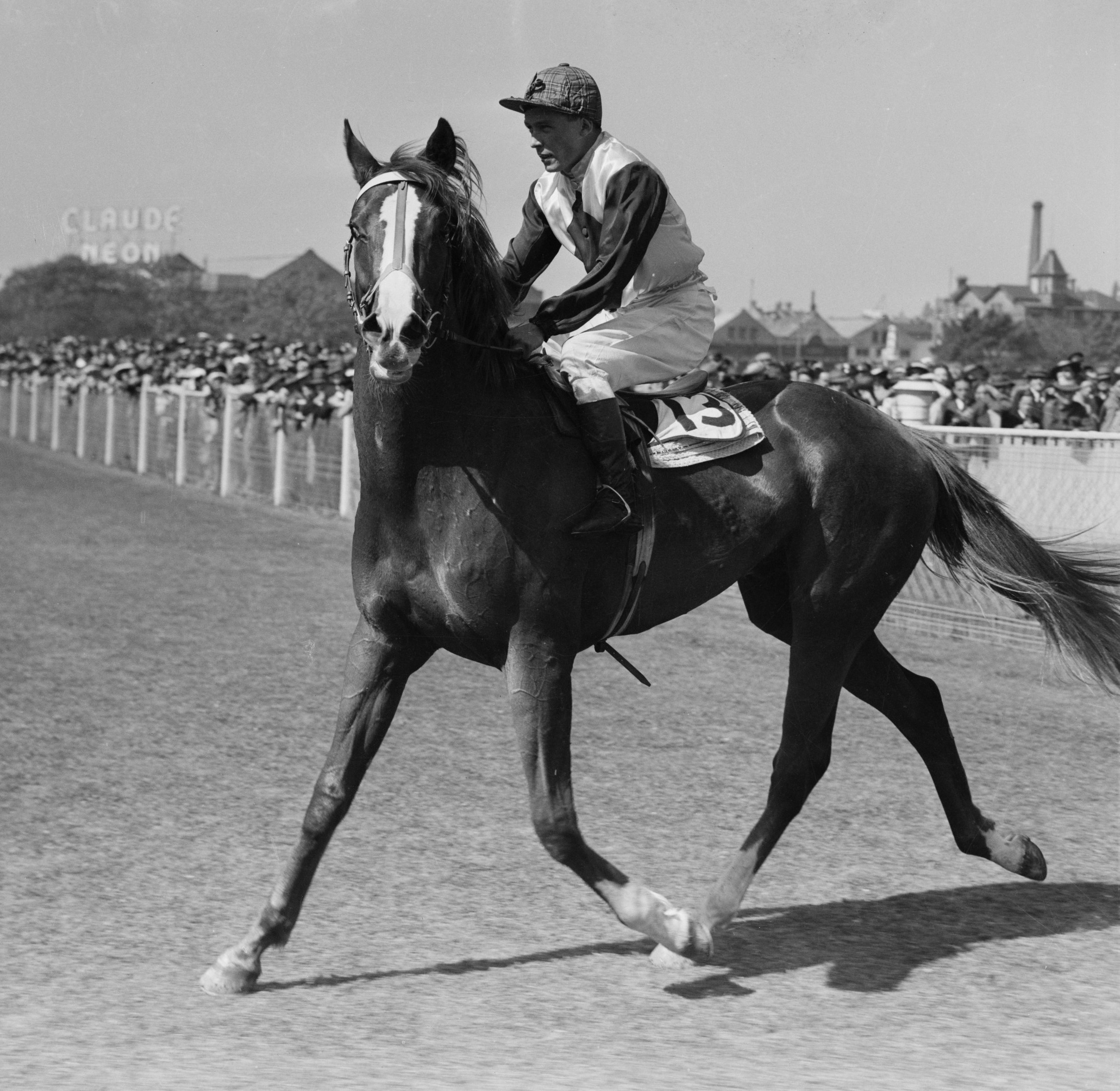
1945 winner – Magnificent

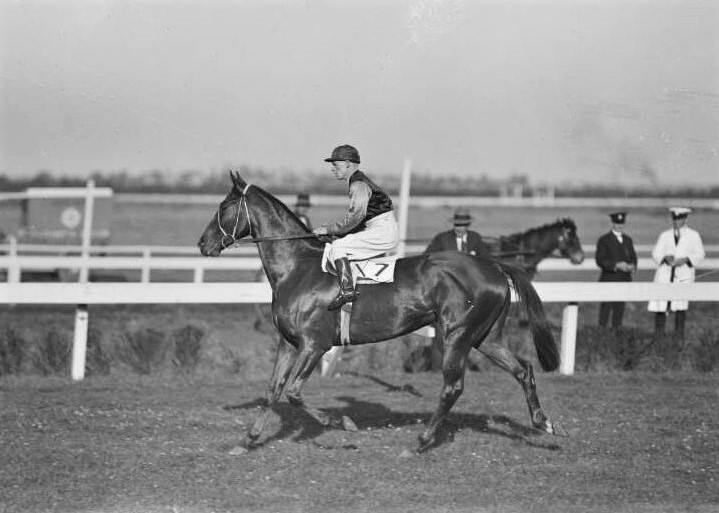
1925 winner – Manfred

== Records ==
Time record: (at current 2,500 metres distance)

- 2:33.60 - Star Of The Realm (1991)

Most wins by a jockey:

- 8 - Bobbie Lewis (1900, 1901, 1904, 1908, 1912, 1914, 1921, 1927)

Most wins by a trainer:

- 8 - James Scobie : (1900, 1901, 1903, 1904, 1908, 1912, 1927, 1937)

== Social attraction ==
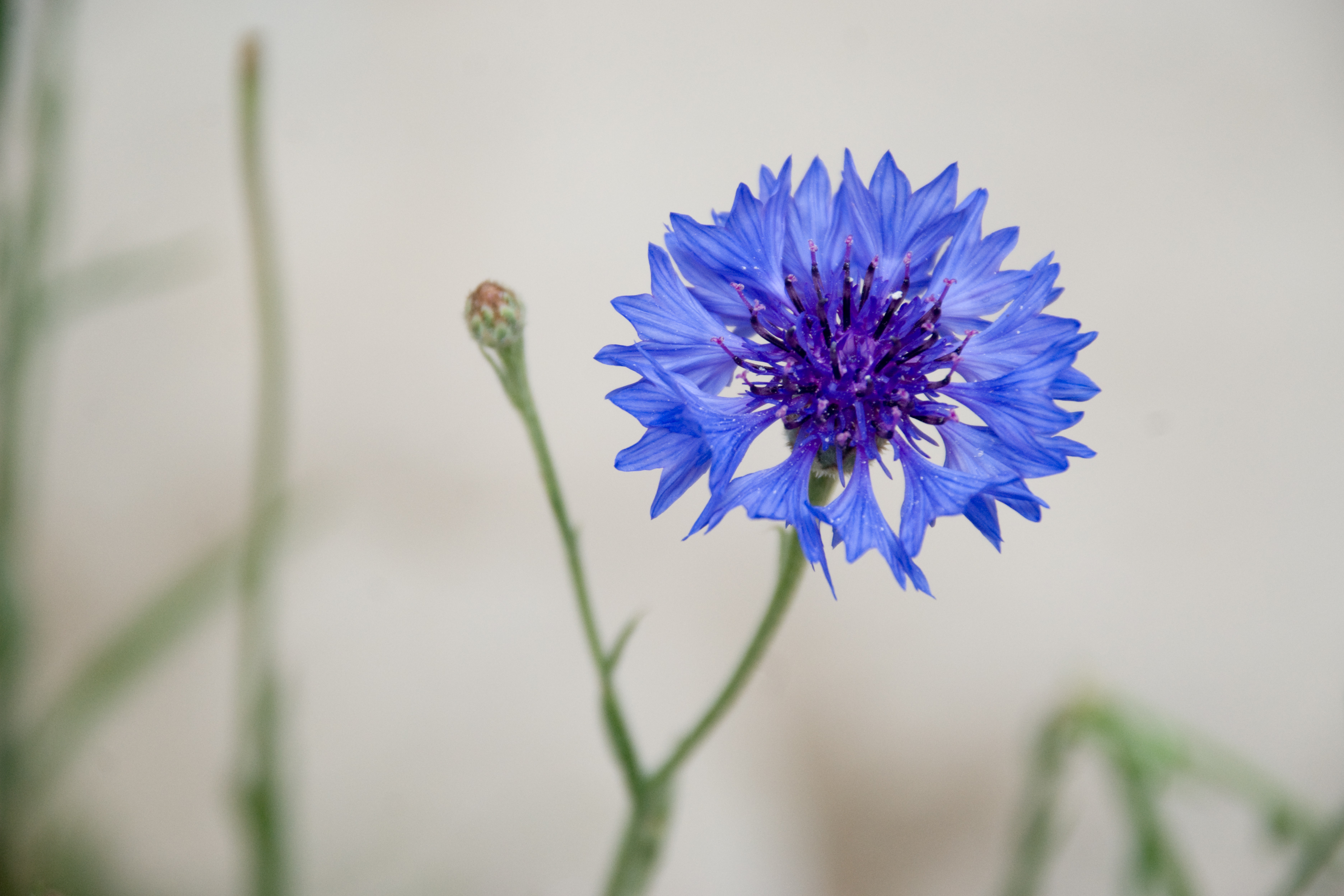
Blue cornflower

While the major focus of AAMI Victoria Derby Day is the racing (since it is the only race day in Australia where each and every race has Group Status), in recent years the annual Fashions on the Field held on the fourth and last day of the Melbourne Cup Carnival celebrations have shared the limelight. Derby Day has become Men's Day in the Fashion Stakes, and every year increasing numbers of fashionable gentlemen competing for prizes and a spot in the social columns. Traditionally black and white are worn on this day by women and morning dress by men. The flower of the day is a blue cornflower. The idea of wearing a cornflower on Derby Day was introduced in 1962 by Mrs Sheelah Wood, wife of prominent VRC committeeman of the time, Mr Samuel Richard Creswick Wood. The 2006 Victoria Derby drew the event's largest crowd, with 129,069 in attendance.

== Attendance ==
The following are attendance figures for the Victoria Cup meeting in past years.

- 2024 – 81,612
- 2023 – 73,056
- 2022 – 71,327
- 2021 – 5,000 (restricted attendance due to the COVID-19 pandemic)
- 2020 – 0 (no attendance due to COVID-19 pandemic restrictions)
- 2019 – 80,214
- 2018 – 91,194
- 2017 – 87,526
- 2016 – 90,136
- 2015 – 85,943
- 2014 – 90,244
- 2013 – 95,223
- 2012 – 98,823
- 2011 – 92,336
- 2010 – 90,361
- 2009 – 108,178
- 2008 – 117,776
- 2007 – 115,705
- 2006 – 129,089
- 2005 – 115,660
- 2004 – 115,542
- 2003 – 97,059
- 2002 – 101,898
- 2001 – 93,029
- 2000 – 92,581
- 1999 – 76,514
- 1998 – 75,805
- 1997 – 64,528
- 1996 – 64,099
- 1995 – 60,404
- 1994 – 54,467
- 1993 – 49,029
- 1992 – 45,729
- 1991 – 46,781
- 1990 – 47,497
- 1989 – 47,226
- 1988 – 44,848
- 1987 – 41,878
- 1986 – 42,824
- 1985 – 40,522
- 1984 – 39,771
- 1983 – 40,017
- 1982 – 42,519
- 1981 – 39,729
- 1980 – 38,032

== Winners ==
The following are past winners of the race.

- 2026 - Stormy Marco
- 2025 - Observer
- 2024 - Goldrush Guru
- 2023 - Riff Rocket
- 2022 - Manzoice
- 2021 - Hitotsu
- 2020 - Johnny Get Angry
- 2019 - Warning
- 2018 - Extra Brut
- 2017 - Ace High
- 2016 - Prized Icon
- 2015 - Tarzino
- 2014 - Preferment
- 2013 - Polanski
- 2012 - Fiveandahalfstar
- 2011 - Sangster
- 2010 - Lion Tamer
- 2009 - Monaco Consul
- 2008 - Rebel Raider
- 2007 - Kibbutz
- 2006 - Efficient
- 2005 - Benicio
- 2004 - Plastered
- 2003 - Elvstroem
- 2002 - Helenus
- 2001 - Amalfi
- 2000 - Hit The Roof
- 1999 - Blackfriars
- 1998 - Arena
- 1997 - Second Coming
- 1996 - Portland Player
- 1995 - Nothin' Leica Dane
- 1994 - Blevic
- 1993 - Mahogany
- 1992 - Redding
- 1991 - Star Of The Realm
- 1990 - Fire Oak
- 1989 - Stylish Century
- 1988 - King's High
- 1987 - Omnicorp
- 1986 - Raveneaux
- 1985 - Handy Proverb
- 1984 - Red Anchor
- 1983 - Bounty Hawk
- 1982 - Grosvenor
- 1981 - Brewery Boy
- 1980 - Sovereign Red
- 1979 - Big Print
- 1978 - Dulcify
- 1977 - Stormy Rex
- 1976 - Unaware
- 1975 - Galena Boy
- 1974 - Haymaker
- 1973 - Taj Rossi
- 1972 - Dayana
- 1971 - Classic Mission
- 1970 - Silver Sharpe
- 1969 - Daryl's Joy
- 1968 - Always There
- 1967 - Savoy
- 1966 - Khalif
- 1965 - Tobin Bronze
- 1964 - Royal Sovereign
- 1963 - Craftsman
- 1962 - Coppelius
- 1961 - New Statesman
- 1960 - Sky High
- 1959 - Travel Boy
- 1958 - Sir Blink
- 1957 - Tulloch
- 1956 - Monte Carlo
- 1955 - Sailor's Guide
- 1954 - Pride Of Egypt
- 1953 - Prince Morvi
- 1952 - Advocate
- 1951 - Hydrogen
- 1950 - Alister
- 1949 - Delta
- 1948 - Comic Court
- 1947 - Beau Gem
- 1946 - Prince Standard
- 1945 - Magnificent
- 1944 - San Martin
- 1943 - Precept
- 1942 - Great Britain
- 1941 - Skipton
- 1940 - Lucrative
- 1939 - Reading
- 1938 - Nuffield
- 1937 - Hua
- 1936 - Talking
- 1935 - Feldspar
- 1934 - Theo
- 1933 - Hall Mark
- 1932 - Liberal
- 1931 - Johnnie Jason
- 1930 - Balloon King
- 1929 - Phar Lap
- 1928 - Strephon
- 1927 - Trivalve
- 1926 - Rampion
- 1925 - Manfred
- 1924 - Spearfelt
- 1923 - Frances Tressady
- 1922 - Whittier
- 1921 - Furious
- 1920 - Salitros
- 1919 - Richmond Main
- 1918 - Eusebius
- 1917 - Biplane
- 1916 - Wolaroi
- 1915 - Patrobas
- 1914 - Carlita
- 1913 - Beragoon
- 1912 - Wolawa
- 1911 - Wilari
- 1910 - Beverage
- 1909 - Prince Foote
- 1908 - Alawa
- 1907 - Mountain King
- 1906 - Poseidon
- 1905 - Lady Wallace
- 1904 - Sylvanite
- 1903 - F.J.A
- 1902 - Abundance
- 1901 - Hautvilliers
- 1900 - Maltster
- 1899 - Merriwee
- 1898 - Cocos
- 1897 - Amberite
- 1896 - Newhaven
- 1895 - Wallace
- 1894 - The Harvester
- 1893 - Carnage
- 1892 - Carmoola
- 1891 - Strathmore
- 1890 - The Admiral
- 1889 - Dreadnought
- 1888 - Ensign
- 1887 - The Australian Peer
- 1886 - Trident
- 1885 - Nordenfeldt
- 1884 - Rufus
- 1883 - Martini Henry
- 1882 - Navigator
- 1881 - Darebin
- 1880 - Grand Flaneur
- 1879 - Suwarrow
- 1878 - Wellington
- 1877 - Chester
- 1876 - Briseis
- 1875 - Robin Hood
- 1874 - Melbourne
- 1873 - Lapidist
- 1872 - Loup Garou
- 1871 - Miss Jessie
- 1870 - Florence
- 1869 - Charon
- 1869 - My Dream (run New Year's Day)
- 1868 - Fireworks (run New Year's Day)
- 1867 - Fireworks
- 1866 - Sea Gull
- 1865 - Angler
- 1864 - Lantern
- 1863 - Oriflamme
- 1862 - Barwon
- 1861 - Camden
- 1860 - Flying Colours
- 1859 - Buzzard
- 1858 - Brownlock
- 1857 - Tricolor
- 1856 - Flying Doe
- 1855 - Rose Of May

== See also ==
- Carbine Club Stakes (VRC)
- Coolmore Stud Stakes
- The Damien Oliver
- Empire Rose Stakes
- Begonia Belle Stakes
- Rising Fast Stakes (Chatham Stakes)
- The Vanity
- Wakeful Stakes
- List of Australian Group races
- Group races
- Thoroughbred racing in Australia
- Melbourne Spring Racing Carnival
- White shift dress of Jean Shrimpton
