= Summoned Stakes =

- Class: Group 3
- Location: Sandown Racecourse, Melbourne, Australia
- Inaugurated: 1995 (Listed race)
- Race type: Thoroughbred
- Sponsor: Henley Homes (2026)

Race information
- Distance: 1,500 metres
- Surface: Turf
- Track: Left-handed
- Qualification: Mares four years old and older that are not maidens
- Weight: Set weights with penalties
- Purse: $200,000 (2026)

The Summoned Stakes is a Melbourne Racing Club Group 3 Thoroughbred horse race, raced under set weights with penalties conditions for mares aged four years old and upwards, over a distance of 1500 metres run at Sandown Racecourse, Melbourne, Australia in mid November.

== History ==
The race is named after the mare Summoned, who bore five different Group winners.

In 2013 the event was held at Caulfield Racecourse due to construction at Sandown Racecourse.

In 2021 the race was run at Caulfield Racecourse.

=== Grade ===
- 1995–2012 - Listed race
- 2013 onwards - Group 3

=== Distance ===
- 1995–2012 - 1500 metres
- 2013 - 1600 metres
- 2014 onwards - 1500 metres

== Winners ==
The following are past winners of the race.

- 2026 - Concord Connie
- 2025 - Rumbled Again
- 2024 - Rumbled Again
- 2023 - Revolutionary Miss
- 2022 - My Whisper
- 2021 - Steinem
- 2020 - Missile Mantra
- 2019 - Jamaican Rain
- 2018 - I'm A Princess
- 2017 - Long Time Ago
- 2016 - Silent Sedition
- 2015 - Solicit
- 2014 - Politeness
- 2013 - Floria
- 2012 - Cabernet
- 2011 - Hi Belle
- 2010 - Happy Hippy
- 2009 - Dane Julia
- 2008 - Bernicia
- 2007 - Zip Baby Zip
- 2006 - Hasta La Ciao Ciao
- 2005 - Umber
- 2004 - Tully Bellotto
- 2003 - Irongail
- 2002 - Bridal Hill
- 2001 - Paris Heartbeat
- 2000 - It's Platonic
- 1999 - Rose Of Dane
- 1998 - Cannyanna
- 1997 - Vonanne
- 1996 - Innocent Affair
- 1995 - Tolanda

== See also ==
- C F Orr Stakes
- How Now Stakes
- Sandown Guineas
- Zipping Classic
- Thoroughbred Club Stakes
- List of Australian Group races
- Group races
