= Taj Rossi =

Australian-bred Thoroughbred racehorse

- Sire: Matrice
- Grandsire: Masthead (GB)
- Dam: Dark Queen
- Damsire: Coronation Boy (IRE)
- Sex: Stallion
- Foaled: 1970
- Country: Australia
- Colour: Bay
- Owner: Victor Peters
- Trainer: Bart Cummings
- Record: 21: 9-1-4
- Earnings: A$208,980

Major wins
- W.S Cox Plate (1973); Victoria Derby (1973); Ascot Vale Stakes (1973); George Adams Handicap (1973); Moonee Valley Stakes (1973); Sandown Guineas (1973)

Awards
- Australian Horse of the Year (1973/1974)

Taj Rossi (foaled 1970) was a champion Australian Thoroughbred racehorse.

== Background ==
Taj Rossi was sired by Matrice from the mare Dark Queen. He was trained throughout his career by Bart Cummings who bought him at the 1972 Adelaide yearling sales.

== Racing career ==
During the spring of 1973, as a three-year-old his career blossomed winning the Ascot Vale Stakes, Carrum Handicap, Moonee Valley Stakes, Cox Plate, Victoria Derby and the Sandown Guineas.

This string of victories earned Taj Rossi the title of Australian Racehorse of the Year in 1973.

A virus had troubled the horse throughout his career which eventuated in his retirement from the racetrack at the age of four.

== Stud record ==
He spent two years at stud in America where he had moderate success before returning to Australia to continue stud duties. Amongst his stakes winners were Taj Eclipse (Victoria Oaks) and Merimbula Bay (AJC Doncaster Handicap).

The horse died in 1986 at the age of 15.
