= Sandown Guineas =

- Class: Group 2
- Location: Caulfield Racecourse, Melbourne, Australia
- Inaugurated: 1957
- Race type: Thoroughbred
- Sponsor: Sportsbet (2024-2026)

Race information
- Distance: 1,600 metres
- Surface: Turf
- Track: Left-handed
- Qualification: Three year old
- Weight: Set weights colts and geldings – 57 kg fillies – 55 kg
- Purse: $400,000 (2026)

The Sandown Guineas is a Melbourne Racing Club Group 2 Thoroughbred horse race for three year olds at set weights run over a distance of 1600 metres at Caulfield Racecourse, Melbourne, Australia in November.

== History ==
The race was initially introduced for three year old fillies. In 1968 the race was opened for all three year olds. From 1957-1964 and in 2013, the race was transferred to Caulfield Racecourse. Since 2021, the race made a permanent move to Caulfield along with other races such as the Zipping Classic and Eclipse Stakes.

=== Grade ===
- 1968–1978 - Principal race
- 1979 onwards - Group 2

=== Distance ===
- 1957–1967 - 1 mile (~1600 metres)
- 1968–1969 - 1 mile 2 1/2 furlongs (~2100 metres)
- 1970–1971 - 1 mile (~1600 metres)
- 1972 onwards - 1600 metres

== Winners ==
The following are past winners of the race.

=== For three-year-olds ===
- 2026 - Consulate
- 2025 - Sheza Alibi
- 2024 - Snitzanova
- 2023 - Serasana
- 2022 - See You In Heaven
- 2021 - Blue Army
- 2020 - Allibor
- 2019 - Pretty Brazen
- 2018 - Ringerdingding
- 2017 - Villermont
- 2016 - Morton's Fork
- 2015 - Mahuta
- 2014 - Petrology
- 2013 - Paximadia
- 2012 - Tatra
- 2011 - So Swift
- 2010 - Pressday
- 2009 - Kidnapped
- 2008 - Caymans
- 2007 - Schilling
- 2006 - Sender
- 2005 - Cayambe
- 2004 - Binding
- 2003 - Pay Keys
- 2002 - Dextrous
- 2001 - Moon Dragon
- 2000 - Scenic Warrior
- 1999 - Over
- 1998 - Sedation
- 1997 - Special Dane
- 1996 - King Ivor
- 1995 - Peep On The Sly
- 1994 - Baryshnikov
- 1993 - Voting
- 1992 - Navy Seal
- 1991 - Star Video -
- 1990 - Durbridge
- 1989 - Stargazer
- 1988 - Blixen
- 1987 - Ascot Lane
- 1986 - Sea Swell
- 1985 - Shankhill Lass
- 1984 - Brave Salute
- 1983 - Mr. Ironclad
- 1982 - Cossack Prince
- 1981 - Galleon
- 1980 - Polar Air
- 1979 - Snowing
- 1978 - Just A Steal
- 1977 - So Called
- 1976 - Opposition
- 1975 - Better Draw
- 1974 - Shiftmar
- 1973 - Taj Rossi
- 1972 - Carnation For Me
- 1971 - Andros
- 1970 - Abdul
- 1969 - Top Flat
- 1968 - Always There

=== For three-year-old fillies only ===
- 1967 - Begonia Belle
- 1966 - Hialeah
- 1965 - Fire Band
- 1964 - Light Fingers
- 1963 - Ripa
- 1962 - Birthday Card
- 1961 - Indian Summer
- 1960 - Lady Sybil
- 1959 - Twilight Glow
- 1958 - But Beautiful
- 1957 - Orient

== See also ==
- C F Orr Stakes
- How Now Stakes
- Summoned Stakes
- Thoroughbred Club Stakes
- Sandown Stakes
- Zipping Classic
- List of Australian Group races
- Group races
