= Chairman's Handicap (BRC) =

- Class: Group 3
- Location: Doomben Racecourse, Brisbane, Australia
- Inaugurated: 1978 (as BATC Handicap)
- Race type: Thoroughbred - Flat racing
- Sponsor: JRA (2022-25)

Race information
- Distance: 2,000 metres
- Surface: Turf
- Track: Right-handed
- Weight: Quality Handicap
- Purse: A$200,000 (2025)

The Chairman's Handicap is a Brisbane Racing Club Group 3 Australian Thoroughbred open quality handicap, over a distance of 2000 metres at Doomben Racecourse, Brisbane, Australia during the Queensland Winter Racing Carnival.

== History ==
Top stayers in the race prep for Group 3 Premier's Cup at Doomben later in the carnival and the prestigious Brisbane Cup. The race was inaugurated in 1978 as the Brisbane Amateur Turf Club Handicap with Proficient victorious in a time of 2:05.6.

=== Name ===
- 1978 - BATC Handicap
- 1979 - Haig Handicap
- 1980 - BATC Handicap
- 1981 - Haig Handicap
- 1982–1983 - XXXX Handicap
- 1984–1987 - Chairman’s Handicap
- 1988 - Carnival Handicap
- 1989–2007 - Chairman’s Handicap
- 2008 - Riverview Hotel Handicap
- 2009–2015 - Chairman’s Handicap
- 2016 - JRA Cup
- 2017 onwards - Chairman’s Handicap

=== Grade ===
- 1978–1979 - Principal Race
- 1980–1994 - Listed Race
- 1995 onwards Group 3

=== Distance ===
- 1978–1987 – 2020 metres
- 1988 – 2029 metres
- 1989–1999 – 2020 metres
- 2000 – 2040 metres
- 2001–2011 – 2020 metres
- 2012–2014 – 2000 metres
- 2015 – 2200 metres
- 2016 onwards - 2000 metres

=== Other venues ===
- 2013 - Eagle Farm Racecourse
- 2015 - Gold Coast Racecourse
- 2022 - Eagle Farm Racecourse

== Winners ==
The following are past winners of the race.

- 2026 - Middle Earth
- 2025 - Sir Delius
- 2024 - Spirit Ridge
- 2023 - Kalapour
- 2022 - Yonkers
- 2021 - Warning
- 2020 - Le Juge
- 2019 - Le Juge
- 2018 - Anton En Avant
- 2017 - Stampede
- 2016 - Real Love
- 2015 - Epingle
- 2014 - Pretty Pins
- 2013 - Quintessential
- 2012 - Hume
- 2011 - Humma
- 2010 - Crossthestart
- 2009 - Ballack
- 2008 - Fulmonti
- 2007 - Mandela
- 2006 - Art Success
- 2005 - Zingam
- 2004 - So Assertive
- 2003 - Another Warrior
- 2002 - Society Beau
- 2001 - Citi Habit
- 2000 - Kazakh Belle
- 1999 - Cronus
- 1998 - Yacquina Bay
- 1997 - Iron Horse
- 1996 - Juggler
- 1995 - Arborea
- 1994 - Salcantay
- 1993 - Silk Ali
- 1992 - Full Suit
- 1991 - Majestic Boy
- 1990 - Sir Nova
- 1989 - Miss Fleet
- 1988 - Miss Stephenson
- 1987 - Greatness
- 1986 - †Noble Son / Restoration
- 1985 - †Crawford / Bucking Rip
- 1984 - I Will
- 1983 - Lord Seaman
- 1982 - Astrolin
- 1981 - Pelican Point
- 1980 - Lowan Star
- 1979 - Brazen Gambler
- 1978 - Proficient

† Run in two divisions

== See also ==
- Doomben 10,000
- Rough Habit Plate
- Spirit Of Boom Classic
- List of Australian Group races
- Group races
