= Sandown Racecourse =

Horse racing track in Melbourne, Victoria, Australia

Coordinates: 37.952523°S 145.166817°E

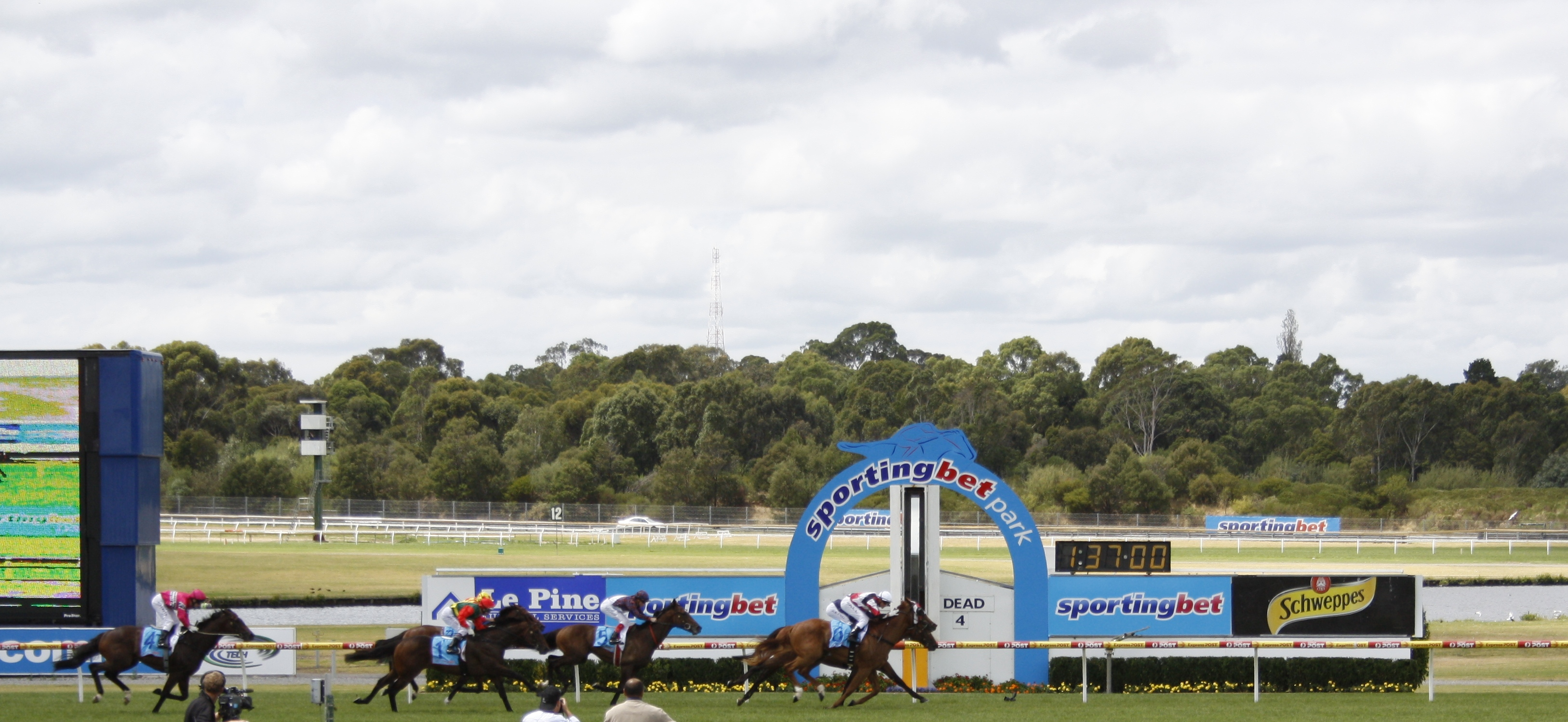
- Sandown Racecourse finish post
- Interactive map of Sandown Racecourse
- Location: Melbourne, Victoria, Australia
- Date opened: 19 June 1965
- Screened on: Seven Network

Sandown Racecourse, currently known as Sportsbet Sandown for naming rights reasons and previously known as Ladbrokes Park, is a Thoroughbred horse racing race track administered by the Melbourne Racing Club in Melbourne, Victoria, Australia. It is situated 25 kilometres south-east of the Melbourne central business district on the Princes Highway in the suburb of Springvale.

== History ==
Built for the Victoria Amateur Turf Club, Sandown is the only metropolitan racecourse built in the 20th century; it opened before a crowd of 52,000 in June 1965. The grandstand was built by Leighton Contractors.

The original course was a turfed oval shape, 1892 metres in circumference and 30 metres wide, with sweeping cambered turns and an uphill home straight of 407 metres.

As a result of an increase in the number of overseas horses attending the Melbourne Spring Racing Carnival, a Quarantine Centre was established at Sandown Racecourse, which was used for the first time in 1997.

The Sandown Racecourse also features a motor racing circuit on the outside of the racecourse, referred to as Sandown Raceway. A similarly named greyhound racing facility, Sandown Park, is just to the south-west, on the opposite side of Lightwood Road.

== Redevelopment ==
In October 2001, the Melbourne Racing Club commenced the redevelopment of Sandown Racecourse. This consisted of an additional 30 metre wide home turn and widening of the main straight from 30 to 45 metres, and widening of the turn out of the straight from 30 to 45 metres. This created two turf tracks. The course using the outer home turn and outside 30 metres in the main straight was named Sandown Hillside, and the course comprising the reconfigured inner home turn and full 45 metres wide straight was named Sandown Lakeside. The Lakeside course has a circumference of 1857 metres and a home straight of 407 metres and the Hillside course is 2087 metres in circumference with a home straight of 491 metres. Racing on the reconfigured tracks commenced on 25 January 2003 with the number of meetings hosted at Sandown being increased from 32 to 41 per season.

The Melbourne Spring Racing Carnival traditionally closes with the Sandown Carnival, one week after the final day of the Flemington carnival, and features the Sandown Guineas and Zipping Classic in November each year.

In 2008 the MRC changed the name to Sportingbet Park. In 2015 the track was again renamed to William Hill Park and in 2016 it was changed to Ladbrokes Park.

== Transport ==
The racecourse can be reached directly by suburban rail in 40 minutes from Flinders Street station, via Sandown Park railway station on the Gippsland railway line that opened in 1965.

== Races ==
The following is a list of Group races which are run at Sandown Park.

Grp	Race name	Age	Sex	Weight	Distance	Date
2	Zipping Classic	Open	Open	wfa	2400	November
2	Sandown Guineas	3YO	Open	sw	1600	November
3	Eclipse Stakes	3YO+	Open	qlty	1800	November
3	Sandown Stakes	4YO+	Open	qlty	1500	November
3	Summoned Stakes	4YO+	Mares	sw+p	1500	November
3	Kevin Heffernan Stakes	Open	Open	wfa	1300	November
