= Melbourne Racing Club =

Horse racing club in Melbourne, Victoria, Australia

The Melbourne Racing Club (MRC) is one of three metropolitan horse racing clubs in Melbourne, Victoria, Australia. It began life as the Victoria Amateur Turf Club in 1875, with E. C. Moore as the club's first Secretary. The first VATC race meeting was held at Dowling Forest Racecourse in Ballarat, on Friday, 24 March 1876. Within six months, the VATC was granted use of Crown land at Caulfield as a permanent home in Melbourne.

== History and race meetings ==
In 1879, the club staged the first running of the Caulfield Cup and, two years later, introduced the Caulfield Guineas and the Toorak Handicap. In addition, the Caulfield Cup was switched to the spring racing season and became the lead up race to the Melbourne Cup. The Futurity Stakes was added to the racing calendar in 1898. In 1922, the Members' Stand was destroyed by fire and, five years, later the Guineas Stand was also burnt down.

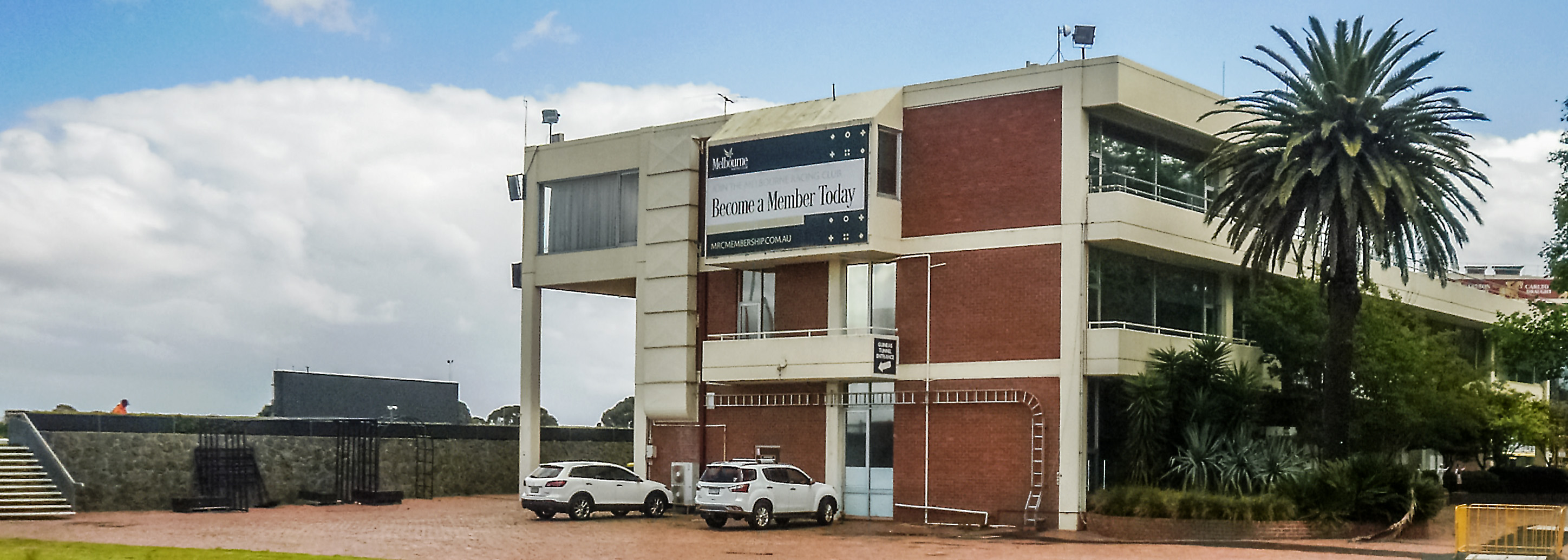
Caulfield Racecourse, where the MRC is based

In 1940, the military occupied Caulfield Racecourse for a period of four years, and it became a depot and barracks for army recruits during the Second World War. The then Vice-President of the United States, Richard Nixon, attended the Caulfield Cup meeting in 1953.

In 1963, the Melbourne Racing Club, which had been created from an amalgamation of the Williamstown Racing Club and the Victorian Racing and Trotting Association, was incorporated into the VATC. Following the merger, the newest of Melbourne's race tracks, Sandown Racecourse, was opened on 19 June 1965, in front of a crowd of over 52,000.

The first Blue Diamond Stakes, a race for two-year-olds, was run at Caulfield in 1971, won by Tolerance.

The glass-fronted Rupert Clarke Grandstand, which replaced the main Caulfield grandstand of the 1920s, was opened in 1992.

With the increase in the number of visiting international horses to the Melbourne Spring Racing Carnival, the VATC established a permanent quarantine centre at Sandown Racecourse in 1997.

In 2001, the Club commenced a five-year, $20 million, strategic plan which included the establishment of 20 feature race days at Caulfield, the construction of a second turf track at Sandown, to be known as Hillside, with the existing circuit being renamed Lakeside, a major upgrade of facilities and training tracks at Caulfield, and a change name from the Victoria Amateur Turf Club to the Melbourne Racing Club.

Jumps racing is conducted at the Sandown track during the winter months, the blue ribbon events being the Australian Steeple and the Australian Hurdle.

In 2024, the club was engulfed in controversy arising from a number of decisions by the MRC board, including the potential sale of Sandown Racecourse, a $250 million plan to replace the glass-fronted Rupert Clarke grandstand, and a $160 million upgrade to the Caulfield course that had included an unpopular new site of the mounting yard, and a new inner track that was rarely used. John Kanga, a board member, gave notice of a motion, backed by more than 150 members’ signatures, to convene a special general meeting of the club to oust five members of the board. Two other members of the board, joined Kanga’s "Save Our MRC" movement, despite having earlier signed an MRC statement criticising his actions.

== See also ==
- Thoroughbred racing in Australia
- Moonee Valley Racing Club
- Victoria Racing Club
