= List of Melbourne Cup placings =

Top four placings in the Melbourne Cup, a horse race at Flemington Racecourse

The Melbourne Cup is Australia's major Thoroughbred horse race. Each year internationally bred or owned horses compete in the race alongside local entrants. Since 1882 New Zealand bred horses have won 40 Melbourne Cups, British bred horses have won five cups, US bred horses four, Irish horses two and one Japanese and German bred horse have each won the Cup. The Melbourne Cup is the richest handicap race in the world.

This is a list of the first four placings (from 2005) in the Melbourne Cup, a Thoroughbred horse race at Flemington Racecourse in Melbourne, Australia.

== Results ==
Pos	Year	No	Horse	Age	Breeding	Jockey	Barrier	Trainer	Weight	Margin	Odds
1st	2025	14	Half Yours	5g	St Jean - La Gazelle	Jamie Melham	(8)	Tony & Calvin McEvoy	53	3:22.46 Soft	8/1
2nd	2025	20	Goodie Two Shoes	7m	Fastnet Rock - Fits Like a Glove	Wayne Lordan	(20)	Joseph O'Brien	51.5	2.75L	40/1
3rd	2025	7	Middle Earth	6g	Roaring Lion - Roheryn	Ethan Brown	(13)	Ciaron Maher	54.5	4.25L	25/1
4th	2025	21	River Of Stars	7m	Sea The Stars - Amazone	Beau Mertens	(14)	Chris Waller	51.5	6.75L	18/1
1st	2024	11	Knight's Choice	5g	Extreme Choice - Midnight Pearl	Robbie Dolan	(5)	John Symons & Sheila Laxon	51.5	3:19.53 Good	90/1
2nd	2024	4	Warp Speed	6h	Drefong - Deep Love	Akira Sugawara	(2)	Noboru Takagi	54.5	0.1L	25/1
3rd	2024	12	Okita Soushi	7h	Galileo - Amicus	Jamie Kah	(9)	Ciaron Maher	51	0.85L	18/1
4th	2024	14	Zardozi	4m	Kingman - Chanderi	Andrea Atzeni	(3)	James Cummings	51	1.31L	13/1
1st	2023	3	Without A Fight	7g	Teofilo - Khor Sheed	Mark Zahra	(16)	Anthony & Sam Freedman	56.5	3:18.37 Good	7/1
2nd	2023	6	Soulcombe	5g	Frankel - Ribbons	João Moreira	(4)	Chris Waller	53.5	2.25L	18/2
3rd	2023	14	Sheraz	7g	Sea The Stars - Shemiyla	Beau Mertens	(22)	Chris Waller	51.5	2.75L	150/1
4th	2023	11	Ashrun	8g	Authorized - Ashantee	Kerrin McEvoy	(11)	Ciaron Maher & David Eustace	51.5	4.75L	25/1
1st	2022	1	Gold Trip	5h	Outstrip - Sarvana	Mark Zahra	(14)	Ciaron Maher & David Eustace	57.5	3:24.04 Soft	20/1
2nd	2022	17	Emissary	6g	Kingman - Soviet Moon	Patrick Moloney	(3)	Mike Moroney	51.5	2L	25/1
3rd	2022	22	High Emocean	6m	Ocean Park - High Joy	Teodore Nugent	(8)	Ciaron Maher & David Eustace	50	3.25L	40/1
4th	2022	8	Deauville Legend	4g	Sea The Stars - Soho Rose	Kerrin McEvoy	(9)	James Ferguson	55	5L	10/3f
1st	2021	4	Verry Elleegant	6m	Zed - Opulence	James McDonald	(18)	Chris Waller	57	3:17.43 Good	17/1
2nd	2021	2	Incentivise	5g	Shamus Award - Miss Argyle	Brett Prebble	(15)	Peter Moody	57	4L	19/10f
3rd	2021	3	Spanish Mission	6h	Noble Mission - Limonar	Craig Williams	(14)	Andrew Balding	57	4.4L	9/1
4th	2021	22	Floating Artist	6g	Nathaniel - Miss Kenton	Teodore Nugent	(10)	Ciaron Maher & David Eustace	50	4.6L	10/1
1st	2020	6	Twilight Payment	8g	Teofilo - Dream On Buddy	Jye McNeil	(12)	Joseph O'Brien	55.5	3:17.34 Good	25/1
2nd	2020	21	Tiger Moth	4h	Galileo - Lesson In Humility	Kerrin McEvoy	(22)	Aidan O'Brien	52.5	0.4L	11/2
3rd	2020	12	Prince Of Arran	8g	Shirocco - Storming Sioux	Jamie Kah	(1)	Charlie Fellowes	54.5	0.6L	17/2
4th	2020	17	The Chosen One	5h	Savabeel - The Glitzy One	Daniel Stackhouse	(5)	Murray Baker & Andrew Forsman	53.5	2.35L	40/1
1st	2019	23	Vow And Declare	4g	Declaration Of War - Geblitzt	Craig Williams	(21)	Danny O'Brien	52	3:24.76 Soft	10/1
2nd	2019	12	Prince Of Arran	7g	Shirocco - Storming Sioux	Michael Walker	(8)	Charlie Fellowes	54	0.2L	16/1
3rd	2019	20	Il Paradiso	4h	Galileo - Famous	Wayne Lordan	(17)	Aidan O'Brien	52.5	0.3L	14/1
4th	2019	3	Master Of Reality	5g	Frankel - L'Ancresse	Frankie Dettori	(1)	Joseph O'Brien	55.5	0.4L	25/1
1st	2018	23	Cross Counter	4g	Teofilo - Waitress	Kerrin McEvoy	(19)	Charlie Appleby	51	3:21.17 Soft	11/1
2nd	2018	9	Marmelo	6h	Duke of Marmalade - Capriolla	Hugh Bowman	(10)	Hughie Morrison	55	1L	11/1
3rd	2018	17	Prince Of Arran	6g	Shirocco - Storming Sioux	Michael Walker	(20)	Charlie Fellowes	53	3L	22/1
4th	2018	13	Finche	5h	Frankel - Binche	Zac Purton	(15)	Chris Waller	54	3.5L	25/1
1st	2017	22	Rekindling	4h	High Chaparral - Sitara	Corey Brown	(4)	Joseph O'Brien	51.5	3:21.19 Good	15/1
2nd	2017	7	Johannes Vermeer	5h	Galileo - Inca Princess	Ben Melham	(3)	Aidan O'Brien	54.5	0.4L	12/1
3rd	2017	9	Max Dynamite	8g	Great Journey - Mascara	Zac Purton	(2)	Willie Mullins	54	2.9L	19/1
4th	2017	13	Big Duke	6g	Raven's Pass - Hazarayna	Brenton Avdulla	(5)	Darren Weir	53.5	5.65L	20/1
1st	2016	17	Almandin	7g	Monsun - Anatola	Kerrin McEvoy	(17)	Robert Hickmott	52	3:20.58 Good	10/1
2nd	2016	13	Heartbreak City	7g	Lando - Moscow Nights	João Moreira	(23)	Tony Martin	54	0.2L	18/1
3rd	2016	6	Hartnell	6g	Authorized - Debonnaire	James McDonald	(12)	John O'Shea	56	4.45L	9/2f
4th	2016	23	Qewy	7g	Street Cry - Princess Nada	Craig Williams	(15)	Charlie Appleby	51.5	6.7L	20/1
1st	2015	19	Prince of Penzance	6g	Pentire - Royal Successor	Michelle Payne	(1)	Darren Weir	53	3:23.15 Good	100/1
2nd	2015	2	Max Dynamite	5h	Great Journey - Mascara	Frankie Dettori	(4)	Willie Mullins	55	0.5L	12/1
3rd	2015	8	Criterion	6g	Sebring - Mica's Pride	Michael Walker	(2)	David A. Hayes & Tom Dabernig	57.5	1.25L	18/1
4th	2015	10	Trip To Paris	5g	Champs Elysees - La Grande Zoa	Tommy Berry	(14)	Ed Dunlop	55	2L	5/1
1st	2014	5	Protectionist	5h	Monsun - Patineuse	Ryan Moore	(10)	Andreas Wöhler	56.5	3:17.71 Good	7/1
2nd	2014	4	Red Cadeaux	8g	Cadeaux Genereux - Artsia	Gérald Mossé	(14)	Ed Dunlop	55	4L	20/1
3rd	2014	12	Who Shot Thebarman	6g	Yamanin Vital (NZ) - Ears Carol (NZ)	Glen Boss	(12)	Chris Waller	57	4.5L	20/1
4th	2014	24	Signoff	5g	Authorized (IRE) - Miss Hepburn (USA)	João Moreira	(15)	Darren Weir	51.5	6L	7/1
1st	2013	6	Fiorente	6h	Monsun - Desert Bloom	Damien Oliver	(5)	Gai Waterhouse	55	3:20.30 Dead	13/2f
2nd	2013	3	Red Cadeaux	7g	Cadeaux Genereux - Artsia	Gérald Mossé	(23)	Ed Dunlop	56.5	0.75L	60/1
3rd	2013	15	Mount Athos	7g	Montjeu - Ionean Sea	Craig Williams	(22)	Luca Cumani	54	2.25L	12/1
4th	2013	19	Simenon	7g	Marju - Epistoliere	Richard Hughes	(12)	Willie Mullins	53.5	2.45L	19/1
1st	2012	14	Green Moon	6h	Montjeu - Green Noon	Brett Prebble	(5)	Robert Hickmott	54.5	3:20.45 Dead	19/1
2nd	2012	11	Fiorente	5h	Monsun - Desert Bloom	James McDonald	(2)	Gai Waterhouse	53.5	1L	30/1
3rd	2012	3	Jakkalberry	7h	Storming Home - Claba Di San Jore	Colm O'Donoghue	(19)	Marco Botti	55.5	2.25L	80/1
4th	2012	24	Kelinni	4g	Refuse To Bend - Orinoco	Glen Boss	(10)	Chris Waller	51	3L	18/1
1st	2011	3	Dunaden	5h	Nicobar - La Marlia	Christophe Lemaire	(13)	Mikel Delzangles	54.5	3:20.84 Good	15/2
2nd	2011	12	Red Cadeaux	5g	Cadeaux Genereux - Artsia	Michael Rodd	(15)	Ed Dunlop	53.5	0.1L	30/1
3rd	2011	9	Lucas Cranach	5h	Mamool - Lots of Love	Corey Brown	(11)	Anthony Freeman	53.5	1.35L	12/1
4th	2011	1	Americain	7h	Dynaformer - America	Gérald Mossé	(14)	Alain de Royer Dupre	58	1.45L	4/1f
1st	2010	8	Americain	6h	Dynaformer - America	Gérald Mossé	(11)	Alain de Royer Dupre	54.5	3:26.87 Slow	12/1
2nd	2010	24	Maluckyday	4g	Zabeel - Natalie Wood	Luke Nolen	(5)	Wayne Hawkes	51	2.75L	8/1
3rd	2010	3	So You Think	4h	High Chaparral - Triassic	Steven Arnold	(2)	Bart Cummings	56	3.25L	2/1f
4th	2010	4	Zipping	9g	Danehill - Social Scene	Nicholas Hall	(15)	Robert Hickmott	55.5	5L	25/1
1st	2009	21	Shocking	4h	Street Cry - Maria Di Castilia	Corey Brown	(21)	Mark Kavanagh	51	3:23.87 Dead	9/1
2nd	2009	8	Crime Scene	7g	Royal Applause - Crime	Kerrin McEvoy	(10)	Saeed bin Suroor	53	0.75L	40/1
3rd	2009	5	Mourilyan	6h	Desert Prince - Mouramara	Glyn Schofield	(13)	Herman Brown	54.5	2.25L	20/1
4th	2009	4	Master O'Reilly	7g	O'Reilly - Without Remorse	Viad Duric	(15)	Danny O'Brien	55	3.75L	11/1
1st	2008	10	Viewed	5h	Scenic - Lovers Knot	Blake Shinn	(8)	Bart Cummings	53	3:20.40 Good	40/1
2nd	2008	12	Bauer	6g	Hailing - Dali's Grey	Corey Brown	(11)	Luca Cumani	52	0.1L	20/1
3rd	2008	4	C'est La Guerre	4g	Shinko King - La Magnifique	Brett Prebble	(5)	John Sadler	54	2.1L	20/1
4th	2008	2	Master O'Reilly	6g	O'Reilly - Without Remorse	Viad Duric	(6)	Danny O'Brien	55	2.5L	25/1
1st	2007	6	Efficient	4g	Zabeel - Refused the Dance	Michael Rodd	(9)	Graeme Rogerson	54.5	3:23.34 Good	16/1
2nd	2007	12	Purple Moon	5g	Galileo - Vanishing Prairie	Damien Oliver	(13)	Luca Cumani	53.5	0.5L	9/2
3rd	2007	24	Mahler	4h	Galileo - Rainbow Goddess	Stephen Baster	(6)	Aidan O'Brien	50.5	3L	9/1
4th	2007	9	Zipping	6g	Danehill - Social Scene	Danny Nikolic	(20)	Robert Hickmott	54	3.4L	13/2
1st	2006	2	Delta Blues	6h	Dance In The Dark - Dixie Splash	Yasunari Iwata	(10)	Katsuhiko Sumii	56	3:21.42 Good	17/1
2nd	2006	12	Pop Rock	6h	Helissio - Pops	Damien Oliver	(11)	Katsuhiko Sumii	53	0.1L	5/1ef
3rd	2006	23	Maybe Better	4g	Intergaze - Amarula	Chris Munce	(3)	Brian Mayfield-Smith	50	4.6L	9/1
4th	2006	13	Zipping	5g	Danehill - Social Scene	Glen Boss	(19)	Graeme Rogerson	52.5	6.1L	9/1
1st	2005	1	Makybe Diva	7m	Desert King - Tugela	Glen Boss	(14)	Lee Freedman	58	3:19.17 Dead	
2nd	2005	16	On A Jeune	5g	Jeune - Chandada Rose	Darren Gauci	(11)	Peter Montgomerie	00	1.3L	
3rd	2005	8	Xcellent	4g	Pentire - Excelo	Michael Coleman	(3)	Michael Moroney	00	1.8L	
4th	2005	22	Leica Falcon	4g	Danehill - Social Scene	Kerrin McEvoy	(20)	Richard Freyer	00		

== Detailed list of winners ==
Year	Winner	Age	Breeding	Foaled	Jockey	Trainer	From	Time	Track	No	Weight	Barrier	Odds
2025	Half Yours	5g	St Jean - La Gazelle	AUS	Jamie Melham	Tony & Calvin McEvoy	AUS	3:22.46	Soft	14	53	(8)	8/1
2024	Knight's Choice	5g	Extreme Choice - Midnight Pearl	AUS	Robbie Dolan	John Symons & Sheila Laxon	AUS	3:19.53	Good	11	51.5	(5)	90/1
2023	Without A Fight	7g	Teofilo - Khor Sheed	IRE	Mark Zahra	Anthony & Sam Freedman	IRE	3:18.37	Good	3	56.5	(16)	7/1
2022	Gold Trip	5h	Outstrip - Sarvana	FR	Mark Zahra	Ciaron Maher & David Eustace	FR	3:24.94	Soft	1	57.5	(14)	20/1
2021	Verry Elleegant	6m	Zed - Opulence	NZ	James McDonald	Chris Waller	AUS	3:17.43	Good	4	57	(18)	17/1
2020	Twilight Payment	8g	Teofilo - Dream On Buddy	IRE	Jye McNeil	Joseph O'Brien	IRE	3:17.34	Good	6	55.5	(12)	25/1
2019	Vow And Declare	4g	Declaration Of War - Geblitzt	AUS	Craig Williams	Danny O'Brien	AUS	3:24.76	Soft	23	52	(21)	10/1
2018	Cross Counter	4g	Teofilo - Waitress	GB	Kerrin McEvoy	Charlie Appleby	GB	3:21.17	Soft	23	51	(19)	11/1
2017	Rekindling	4h	High Chaparral - Sitara	GB	Corey Brown	Joseph O'Brien	IRE	3:21.19	Good	22	51.5	(4)	15/1
2016	Almandin	7g	Monsun - Anatola	GER	Kerrin McEvoy	Robert Hickmott	AUS	3:20.58	Good	17	52	(17)	10/1
2015	Prince of Penzance	6g	Pentire - Royal Successor	NZ	Michelle Payne	Darren Weir	AUS	3:23.15	Good	19	53	(1)	100/1
2014	Protectionist	5h	Monsun - Patineuse	GER	Ryan Moore	Andreas Wohler	GER	3:17.71	Good	5	56.5	(11)	7/1
2013	Fiorente	6h	Monsun - Desert Bloom	IRE	Damien Oliver	Gai Waterhouse	AUS	3.20.30	Dead	6	55.0	(5)	13/2f
2012	Green Moon	6h	Montjeu - Green Noon	IRE	Brett Prebble	Robert Hickmott	AUS	3:20.45	Dead	14	53.5	(5)	19/1
2011	Dunaden	5h	Nicobar - La Marlia	FR	Christophe Lemaire	Mikel Delzangles	FR	3.20.84	Good	3	54.5	(13)	15/2
2010	Americain	6h	Dynaformer - American	United States	Gérald Mossé	Alain de Royer Dupre	FR	3.26.87	Slow	8	54.5	(11)	12/1
2009	Shocking	4h	Street Cry - Machiavellian	AUS	Corey Brown	Mark Kavanagh	AUS	3.23.87	Dead	21	51	(21)	9/1
2008	Viewed	5h	Scenic - Lovers Knot	NZ	Blake Shinn	Bart Cummings	AUS	3.20.40	Good	10	53	(8)	40/1
2007	Efficient	4g	Zabeel - Refused the Dance	NZ	Michael Rodd	Graeme Rogerson	AUS	3.23.34	Good	6	54.5	(9)	16/1
2006	Delta Blues	5h	Sunday Silence - Dixie Splash	JPN	Yasunari Iwata	Katsuhiko Sumii	JPN	3.21.47	Good	2	56	(10)	17/1
2005	Makybe Diva	6m	Desert King - Tugela	GB	Glen Boss	Lee Freedman	AUS	3.19.17	Dead	1	58	(14)	7/2f
2004	Makybe Diva	5m	Desert King - Tugela	GB	Glen Boss	Lee Freedman	AUS	3.28.55	Dead	5	55.5	(7)	5/2f
2003	Makybe Diva	4m	Desert King - Tugela	GB	Glen Boss	David Hall	AUS	3.19.90	Good	12	51	(14)	7/1
2002	Media Puzzle	5h	Theatrical - Market Slide	United States	Damien Oliver	Dermot K. Weld	IRE	3.16.97	Good	14	52.5	(3)	11/2
2001	Ethereal	4m	Rhythm - Romanee Conti	NZ	Scott Seamer	Sheila Laxon	NZ	3.21.08	Dead	13	52	(11)	9/1
2000	Brew	6g	Sir Tristram - Horlicks	NZ	Kerrin McEvoy	Mike Moroney	NZ	3.18.68	Good	24	49	(22)	14/1
1999	Rogan Josh	7g	Old Spice - Eastern Mystique	AUS	John Marshall	Bart Cummings	AUS	3.19.64	Good	17	50	(21)	5/1
1998	Jezabeel	6m	Zabeel - Passefleur	NZ	Chris Munce	Brian Jenkins	NZ	3.18.59	Good	22	51	(16)	6/1f
1997	Might and Power	4g	Zabeel - Benediction	NZ	Jim Cassidy	Jack Denham	AUS	3.18.33	Good	3	56	(2)	7/2f
1996	Saintly	4g	Sky Chase - All Grace	AUS	Darren Beadman	Bart Cummings	AUS	3.18.80	Good	5	55.5	(3)	8/1
1995	Doriemus	5g	Norman Pentaquad - Golden Woods	NZ	Damien Oliver	Lee Freedman	AUS	3.27.60	Heavy	6	54.5	(21)	10/1
1994	Jeune	6h	Kalaglow - Youthful	GB	Wayne Harris	David Hayes	AUS	3.19.80	Good	3	56.5	(9)	16/1
1993	Vintage Crop	7g	Rousillon - Overplay	IRE	Michael Kinane	Dermot K. Weld	IRE	3.23.40	Slow	6	55.5	(5)	14/1
1992	Subzero	4g	Kala Dancer - Wiley Trader	AUS	Greg Hall	Lee Freedman	AUS	3.24.70	Slow	8	54.5	(14)	4/1
1991	Let's Elope	4m	Nassipour - Sharon Jane	NZ	Steven King	Bart Cummings	AUS	3.18.90	Fast	15	51	(10)	3/1f
1990	Kingston Rule	5h	Secretariat - Rose of Kingston	United States	Darren Beadman	Bart Cummings	AUS	3.16.30	Fast	8	53	(1)	7/1ef
1989	Tawrrific	5g	Tawfig - Joyarty	NZ	Shane Dye	Lee Freedman	AUS	3.17.10	Fast	6	54	(11)	30/1
1988	Empire Rose	6m	Sir Tristram - Summer Fleur	NZ	Tony Allan	Laurie Laxon	NZ	3.18.90	Fast	11	53.5	(20)	5/1ef

== See also ==
- Melbourne Cup
- List of Melbourne Cup winners
- Victoria Racing Club
- Australian horse-racing
- Melbourne Spring Racing Carnival
