= 1996 Melbourne Cup =

Two-mile handicap horse race

- Melbourne Cup
- Location: Flemington Racecourse
- Date: 5 November 1996
- Distance: 2 miles
- Winning horse: Saintly
- Winning time: 3:18.8
- Final odds: 8/1
- Jockey: Darren Beadman
- Trainer: Bart Cummings
- Surface: Turf

Nothin' Leica Dane and Saintly at the 300 they reach the lead together from Count Chivas and then came Greg Shot and Sky Beau well back. It's Saintly at the 200, Saintly dashing two lengths in front, Cummings and Beadman, Cummings going for 10 and he's got it! Saintly well clear of Count Chivas, Nothin Leica Dane and Sky Beau but Saintly! Saintly wins it easily.

— Commentator Greg Miles describes the climax of the race

The 1996 Melbourne Cup was a two-mile handicap horse race which took place on Tuesday, 5 November 1996. The race was run over 3,200 metres (1.988 mi), at Flemington Racecourse.

The race was won by the 4 year old gelding, Saintly. Saintly at 8/1 defeated the New Zealand bred geldings: Count Chivas, Skybeau and Senator. The previous year's winner and runner-up, Doriemus and Nothin' Leica Dane were 6th and 5th respectively.

Saintly who had previously won the 1996 Australian Cup, Hill Stakes and Cox Plate was sired by Sky Chase (NZ) out of the Sir Tristram mare All Grace (NZ).

Saintly was ridden by Darren Beadman and trained by Bart Cummings. It was Darren's second win in the race after Kingston Rule in the 1990 Melbourne Cup. Saintly's victory was Bart's tenth training success in the race.

The top weighted horse in the race was Doriemus carrying 58kgs for 6th then Count Chivas on 57kg (2nd).

== Field ==
This is a list of horses which ran in the 1996 Melbourne Cup.

Place	Horse	Weight	Trainer	Jockey
1st	Saintly	55.5	Bart Cummings	Darren Beadman
2nd	Count Chivas	57	Lee Freedman	Steven King
3rd	Skybeau	50	L J Smith	Jason Holder
4th	Senator	53	J L Tims	Lance O'Sullivan
5th	Nothin' Leica Dane	55	Gai Waterhouse	Shane Dye
6th	Doriemus	58	Lee Freedman	Damien Oliver
7th	Grey Shot	55	I A Balding	Pat Eddery
8th	Sapio	54	Sylvia Kay	John Walker
9th	Alcove	50	Tom Hughes (Junior)	Brian York
10th	Cheviot	50.5	Cliff Brown	Damien Browne
11th	The Bandette	51	John Wheeler	Noel Harris
12th	Arctic Scent	51.5	J W Mason	Brent Stanley
13th	Istidaad	53.5	Peter C Hayes	Greg Hall
14th	Circles Of Gold	50.5	Brian Smith	Brett Prebble
15th	Oscar Schindler	56.5	K Prendergast	Michael Kinane
16th	Centico	48.5	John Sadler	Andrew Payne
17th	The Phantom Chance	53.5	John Wheeler	Patrick Payne
18th	Super Slew	51.5	Clarry Connors	Mick Dittman
19th	Few Are Chosen	50.5	Gai Waterhouse	Darren Gauci
20th	Court Of Honour	56.5	P W Chapple-Hyam	Simon Marshall
21st	My Kiwi Gold	49.5	Bart Cummings	John Marshall
22nd	Beaux Art	52	D A Edwards	Jason Hustwitt
