= 1994 Melbourne Cup =

Edition of the Melbourne Cup

- Melbourne Cup
- Location: Flemington Racecourse
- Date: 1 Nov 1994
- Distance: 2 miles
- Winning horse: Jeune
- Winning time: 3:19.8
- Final odds: 16/1
- Jockey: Wayne Harris
- Trainer: David A. Hayes
- Owner: Shadwell Racing
- Surface: Turf

But Jeune hit the front, Jeune out by two lengths to Paris Lane, Alcove, Double Take, Oompala. Jeune the leader though, Jeune in front of Paris Lane he's got a two length break, Oompala the outside. It's Jeune still in front, he's two lengths clear, he's holding them and Jeune's going to win the Melbourne Cup by two lengths to Paris Lane, Oompala a half head away third.

— Commentator Greg Miles describes the climax of the race

The 1994 Melbourne Cup was a two-mile handicap horse race which took place on Tuesday, 1 November 1994. The race was run over 3,200 metres (1.988 mi), at Flemington Racecourse.

The race was won by the British horse, Jeune. His victory followed that of the Irish horse, Vintage Crop in the 1993 Melbourne Cup. Jeune at 16/1 defeated Paris Lane with the outsiders Oompala and Double Take making up the first four finishers. The previous year's winner and 5/1 favourite, Vintage Crop, was seventh.

At the presentation the winning jockey Wayne Harris dedicated the win to a 12-year-old boy from Victoria, Andrew Read who was suffering from a brain tumour. Read's mother had previously written to Harris who had battled with the same illness 11 years earlier.

== Field ==
This is a list of horses which ran in the 1994 Melbourne Cup.

Place	Horse	Weight	Trainer	Jockey
1st	Jeune	56.5	David A. Hayes	Wayne Harris
2nd	Paris Lane	55.5	Lee Freedman	Damien Oliver
3rd	Oompala	52.5	John Wallace	Larry Cassidy
4th	Double Take	52	Royce Dowling	Greg Childs
5th	Alcove	51	Tom Hughes (Junior)	Patrick Payne
6th	Hear That Bell	54	John F. Meagher	Steven King
7th	Vintage Crop	60	Dermot Weld	Michael Kinane
8th	Grass Valley	50.5	Colin Anderson	Alf Matthews
9th	Top Rating	52.5	David A. Hayes	Greg Hall
10th	Starstruck	51	Kay Miller	Mark Miller
11th	Glastonbury	52	David A. Hayes	Grant Cooksley
12th	Oppressor	50	Greg Mance	David Taggart
13th	Major Decision	48.5	Graeme Rogerson	Kevin Moses
14th	Gossips	51.5	Bart Cummings	Darren Beadman
15th	Our Pompeii	56	George Hanlon	Jimmy Cassidy
16th	Pindi	48.5	Colin Anderson	Peter Knuckey
17th	Sweet Glory	48.5	Barry Bennett	Peter Shepherd
18th	Coachwood	49	Lee Freedman	Shane Dye
19th	Air Seattle	55.5	Clarry Connors	Rod Griffiths
20th	River Verdon	57	David Hill	John Marshall
21st	Toll Bell	50	Mick Price	Peter Mertens
22nd	Cliveden Gail	49	Dermot Weld	William Carson
23rd	Quick Ransom	53	Mark Johnston	Brent Thomson
24th	Gold Sovereign	51.5	Kerry Parker	Craig Carmody
