= 1991 Melbourne Cup =

Edition of the Melbourne Cup

- Melbourne Cup
- Location: Flemington Racecourse
- Date: 5 November 1991
- Distance: 2 miles
- Winning horse: Let's Elope
- Winning time: 3:18.9
- Final odds: 3/1
- Jockey: Steven King
- Trainer: Bart Cummings
- Surface: Turf

Let's Elope hit the front in the Cup 300 metres to run, Ivory Way battling back then Super Impose and Sheva's Revenge late. But Let's Elope has burst away and the Foster's Melbourne Cup belongs to the mare! Let's Elope bolts the cup in wins by three lengths and it's a Cummings quinella! Sheva's Revenge got second close up on the inside Magnolia Hall.

— Commentator Dan Mielicki describes the climax of the race

The 1991 Melbourne Cup was a two-mile handicap horse race which took place on Tuesday, 5 November 1991. The race was run over 3,200 metres (1.988 mi), at Flemington Racecourse.

The Cup was won by the New Zealand bred mare Let's Elope and was the ninth of Bart Cummings' twelve victories in the event. It was the only win by Steven King in the Melbourne Cup.

Let's Elope had previously won the Turnbull Stakes, Caulfield Cup and Mackinnon Stakes in a row and went into the race as the 3/1 favourite on a fast track. She won by 2.5 lengths from the fast finishing Shiva's Revenge who was also trained by Bart Cummings, with Magnolia Hall third.

== Field ==
This is a list of horses which ran in the 1991 Melbourne Cup.

Place	Horse	Weight	Trainer	Jockey
1st	Let's Elope (NZ)	51kg	Bart Cummings	Steven King
2nd	Shiva's Revenge (NZ)	53.5	Bart Cummings	Shane Dye
3rd	Magnolia Hall (NZ)	52.5	Helen Page	Brian York
4th	Super Impose (NZ)	60	Lee Freedman	Darren Beadman
5th	Ivory Way (USA)	49.5	David A. Hayes	Michael Clarke
6th	Rasheek (USA)	51.5	David A. Hayes	Peter Hutchinson
7th	Al Maheb (USA)	56.5	David Hayes	Darren Gauci
8th	Just A Dancer (NZ)	56.5	Graeme Rogerson	Jim Cassidy
9th	Castletown (NZ)	57	Paddy Busuttin	Noel Harris
10th	Grooming	51.5	Lee Freedman	Damien Oliver
11th	Maharajah (NZ)	49.5	T J Smith	Malcolm Johnston
12th	Moods	49.5	A J Marshall	Bruce Compton
13th	Lord Revenir (NZ)	54	Bart Cummings	Grant Cooksley
14th	Sydeston	57.5	Bob Hoysted	Mick Dittman
15th	Cool Credit	50.5	George Hanlon	Kevin Forrester
16th	Alphabel	53	David A. Hayes	Glen Darrington
17th	Diego (NZ)	52.5	Dave O'Sullivan	Lance O'Sullivan
18th	Te Akau Pearl (NZ)	50	Roger James	Jim Collett
19th	Nayrizi (IRE)	54	Pat Hyland	Greg Hall
20th	Dr Grace (NZ)	56	Dr G Chapman	Kevin Moses
21st	Pontiac Lass (NZ)	49.5	Murray Baker	Tony Allan
22nd	Weekend Delight (NZ)	50.5	Bart Cummings	Greg Childs
23rd	Rural Prince (NZ)	49.5	Graeme Sanders	Larry Cassidy
24th	Sunshine Sally	48	George Hanlon	Patrick Payne
