= 1990 Melbourne Cup =

Edition of the Melbourne Cup

- Melbourne Cup
- Location: Flemington Racecourse
- Date: 6 Nov 1990
- Distance: 3200 Metres
- Winning horse: Kingston Rule
- Winning time: 3:16.4
- Final odds: 7/1
- Jockey: Darren Beadman
- Trainer: Bart Cummings
- Surface: Turf

At the 300, Savage Toss in front Our Magicman tries to get him and Kingston Rule coming home very stoutly! Kingston Rule has hit the front heres Na Botto and Mr. Brooker. Kingston Rule in front from The Phatom diving up on the inside. Kingston Rule and The Phatom from Na Botto. It's Kingston Rule he'll give Bart his eighth! Kingston Rule from The Phatom, third is Mr. Brooker!

— Commentator Greg Miles describes the climax of the race

The 1990 Melbourne Cup was a two-mile handicap horse race which took place on Tuesday, 6 November 1990. The race, run over 3,200 metres (1.988 mi), at Flemington Racecourse.

The race was won by Kingston Rule who was sired by 1973 American Triple Crown winner Secretariat and was out of Rose of Kingston who won VRC Oaks and Australian Derby in 1982. Kingston Rule lost his first race in Australia by 35 lengths when he was trained by Tommy Smith. He was transferred to the stable of Bart Cummings who trained him as a stayer. In 1990 Kingston Rule won Moonee Valley Gold Cup and Lexus Stakes before the Cup. Starting a 7/1 equal favourite with The Phantom and ridden by Darren Beadman Kingston Rule beat The Phantom and finished the 3200 meters in a record time of 3:16.30 which still stands.

== Field ==
This is a list of horses which ran in the 1990 Melbourne Cup.

Place	Horse	Trainer	Jockey
1st	Kingston Rule	Bart Cummings	Darren Beadman
2nd	The Phantom	M P Parker	Grant Cooksley
3rd	Mr. Brooker	Peter Hurdle	Greg Childs
4th	Na Botto	P Hollinshead	Larry Cassidy
5th	Mount Olympus	David A. Hayes	M Carson
6th	Aquidity	D Walsh	David Walsh
7th	Savage Toss	Lee Freedman	Brian Hibberd
8th	Flying Luskin	Trevor McKee	Peter Johnson
9th	La Tristia	Bart Cummings	Steven King
10th	Our Magic Man	J Lee	Kevin Moses
11th	Sydeston	Bob Hoysted	Mick Dittman
12th	Just A Dancer	Graeme Rogerson	Jim Cassidy
13th	Chaleyer	F Lewis	Shane Dye
14th	Ali Boy	M Phillips	Harry White
15th	Shuzohra	Errol Skelton	Larry Olsen
16th	Tawriffic	D McNabb	Alf Matthews
17th	Rainbow Myth	Ralph Manning	Michael Clarke
18th	Dalraffin	E Murray	Kevin Forrester
19th	Water Boatman	David Hayes	Peter Hutchinson
20th	Frontier Boy	Lee Freedman	Damien Oliver
21st	Betoota	Wayne Walters	R Heffernan
22nd	Rising Fear	L Pickering	C Browell
23rd	Selwyn's Mate	Michael Moroney	B Werner
24th	Donegal Mist	G Maynes	J Marshall
