= 1993 Melbourne Cup =

Edition of the Melbourne Cup

- Melbourne Cup
- Location: Flemington Racecourse
- Date: 2 Nov 1993
- Distance: 2 miles
- Winning horse: Vintage Crop
- Winning time: 3:23.4
- Final odds: 14/1
- Jockey: Michael Kinane
- Trainer: Dermot Weld
- Surface: Turf

Te Aku Nick still in front at the 300 lead Frontier Boy a length and half further back, Vintage Crop he's coming home the Irish galloper. Te Aku Nick is in front of Frontier Boy, Vintage Crop is a danger and Great Vintage is late. Te Aku Nick but Vintage Crop as got him, Vintage Crop, the Irish horse will win the Melbourne Cup! Vintage Crop two lengths, Te Aku Nick just held second! Mercator flashed up for third.

— Commentator Greg Miles describes the climax of the race

The 1993 Melbourne Cup was a two-mile handicap horse race which took place on Tuesday, 2 November 1993. The race, run over 3,200 metres (1.988 mi), at Flemington Racecourse.

The race was won by Irish horse Vintage Crop becoming the first European Horse to win the race. With his win the Melbourne Cup was put on the international map. Vintage Crop had won the Curragh Cup and Irish St. Leger before Weld took him to Australia. The Flemington Racecourse was soaked by overnight rain and Vintage Crop at 14/1 defeated outsiders Te Akau Nick and Mercator.

== Field ==
This is a list of horses which ran in the 1993 Melbourne Cup.

| Place | Horse | Trainer | Jockey |
|---|---|---|---|
| 1st | Vintage Crop | Dermot Weld | Michael Kinane |
| 2nd | Te Akau Nick | Gai Waterhouse | Robert Vance |
| 3rd | Mercator | Royce Dowling | Chris Johnson |
| 4th | Great Vintage | Bart Cummings | Steven King |
| 5th | Frontier Boy | Bart Cummings | Darren Beadman |
| 6th | Tennessee Jack | Bart Cummings | Damien Oliver |
| 7th | Maraakiz | David Hayes | Michael Clarke |
| 8th | The Phantom | Noel Eales | Jim Cassidy |
| 9th | Drum Taps | Lord Huntingdon | Frankie Dettori |
| 10th | Castletown | Paddy Busuttin | Noel Harris |
| 11th | Azzaam | David Hayes | Larry Cassidy |
| 12th | Cavallieri | Laurie Laxon | Kevin Moses |
| 13th | Fraar | David Hayes | Darren Gauci |
| 14th | Our Pompeii | George Hanlon | Mick Dittman |
| 15th | Subzero | Lee Freedman | Greg Hall |
| 16th | Young Pirate | D McNabb | Alf Matthews |
| 17th | Ultimate Aim | Colin Jillings | Patrick Payne |
| 18th | Field Officer | George Hanlon | T Jackman |
| 19th | Dancing Lord | M Pearson | Harry White |
| 20th | Slight Chance | Bob Thomsen | John Marshall |
| 21st | Air Seattle | Clarry Conners | Shane Dye |
| 22nd | Silk Ali | Bob Thomsen | Grant Cooksley |
| 23rd | Diamond Bases | Tony Vasil | B Clements |
| 24th | Our Tristalight | Bart Cummings | Greg Childs |
