= 2002 Melbourne Cup =

Australian horse race

- Melbourne Cup
- Location: Flemington Racecourse; Melbourne, Australia
- Date: 5 November 2002
- Winning horse: Media Puzzle
- Jockey: Damien Oliver
- Trainer: Dermot Weld
- Surface: Grass
- Attendance: 102,533

The 2002 Melbourne Cup was the 142nd running of the Melbourne Cup, a prestigious Australian Thoroughbred horse race. The race, run over 3,200 metres (1.988 mi), was held on 5 November 2002 at Melbourne's Flemington Racecourse.

It was won by Media Puzzle, trained by Dermot Weld and ridden by Damien Oliver. A week before the race Damien's older brother Jason, who was also a jockey was killed from severe head injuries suffered after a fall during a trail the day before at Belmont Park Racecourse in Perth.

Media Puzzle, Media Puzzle, Damien takes him to the lead with 200 meters to go and he's shot away. Media Puzzle three lengths in front. This is the one Damien's wanted, this is the one he is riding for Jason and Media Puzzle goes to the line to win the Melbourne Cup. Damien stands high in the irons, salutes the heavens, that's for Jason! It's Media Puzzle the winner of the Melbourne Cup.

— Commentator Wayne Wilson describes the climax of the race

== Field ==
This is a list of horses which ran in the 2002 Melbourne Cup.

Place	Number	Horse	Trainer	Jockey
1st	14	Media Puzzle (USA)	Dermot Weld (IRE)	Damien Oliver
2nd	15	Mr. Prudent	George Hanlon	Corey Brown
3rd	11	Beekeeper (GB)	Saeed bin Suroor (UAE)	Kerrin McEvoy
4th	1	Vinnie Roe (IRE)	Dermot Weld (IRE)	Pat Smullen
5th	16	Pentastic	David Hall	Glen Boss
6th	20	Distinctly Secret (NZ)	Mark Walker (NZ)	Steven King
7th	2	Jardines Lookout (IRE)	Alan Jarvis (GB)	Patrick Payne
8th	10	Rain Gauge	George Hanlon	Greg Childs
9th	7	Freemason	John Hawkes	Darren Gauci
10th	23	Miss Meliss (NZ)	Bart Cummings	Craig Newitt
11th	12	County Tyrone	Max Lees	Jim Cassidy
12th	13	Hail (NZ)	Bruce Marsh (NZ)	Noel Harris
13th	22	Thong Classic	Pat Carey	Brett Prebble
14th	17	Prized Gem (NZ)	Murray Baker (NZ)	Michael Rodd
15th	21	Grey Song	Tommy Hughes Snr.	Chris Munce
16th	3	Daliapour (IRE)	Michael Stoute	Michael Kinane
17th	19	Cyclades (NZ)	Cydne Evans (NZ)	Scott Seamer
18th	9	Pugin (IRE)	Saeed bin Suroor (UAE)	Frankie Dettori
19th	18	Victory Smile	Donna Logan (NZ)	Darren Beasley
20th	6	Hatha Anna (IRE)	Saeed bin Suroor (UAE)	Richard Hills
21st	5	Helene Vitality (NZ)	David Hayes	Gerald Mosse
22nd	24	Requiem	Tony McEvoy	Craig Williams
Last	4	Sandmason (GB)	Tony McEvoy	Steven Arnold
SCR	~~8~~	~~Maguire (NZ)~~	~~John Collins (NZ)~~	
