= Tie the Knot =

Thoroughbred racehorse

Tie The Knot
- Sire: Nassipour (USA)
- Grandsire: Blushing Groom (FR)
- Dam: Whisked (AUS)
- Damsire: Whiskey Road (USA)
- Sex: Gelding
- Foaled: 1994
- Country: Australia
- Colour: Chestnut
- Breeder: Sandy Tait & Jill Nivison
- Owner: Sandy Tait & Jill Nivison
- Trainer: Guy Walter
- Record: 62: 21-9-8
- Earnings: A$6,212,835

Major wins
- Spring Champion Stakes (1997); Rosehill Guineas (1998); Sydney Cup (1998, 1999); Underwood Stakes (1998); Chipping Norton Stakes (1999, 2000, 2001, 2002); The BMW Stakes (1999, 2000); Ranvet Stakes (2000, 2001)

Awards
- Australian Champion Stayer (2000)

Honours
- Australian Racing Hall of Fame
- Last updated on 17 May 2021

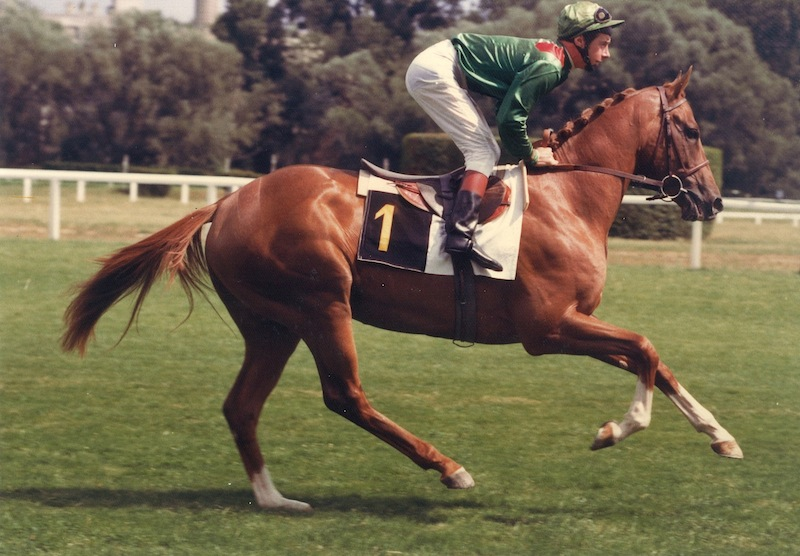
Blushing groom & Henri SAMANI 1976

Tie The Knot (foaled 1994 - Died October 2012) was an Australian-bred Thoroughbred racehorse who won 13 Group One races. In 1999-2000, he was voted Australian Champion Stayer and in 2021 was inducted into the Australian Racing Hall of Fame.

== Breeding ==
Tie the Knot was a chestnut gelding sired by Nassipour (USA) from Whisked by Whiskey Road (USA). Nassipour was also the sire of Let's Elope (NZ), who won the Melbourne Cup, Mackinnon Stakes and Caulfield Cup. Tie the Knot was bred and raced by Mr O.P. Tait and Mrs S.S. Nivison. He was a half brother to the stakes winner Dream Ballad by Singspiel (IRE) and eight other named horses. Their dam, Whisked, won three group races and almost A$550,000, including the VATC One Thousand Guineas. She died on 29 September 2009 from complications after producing a live filly by Strategic.

== Racing career ==
Tie the Knot won the Sydney Cup in both 1998 and 1999 and captured the Group one Chipping Norton Stakes in four consecutive years between 1999 and 2002.

He retired from racing with a record of 21 wins and 17 minor placings and earnings of A$6,212,835 from his 62 starts. His total of 13 group one wins has been topped in Australasia only by Black Caviar's 15 wins, Kingston Town's 14 and is equal to Sunline's. The only other horses to better his number of G1 wins are Winx John Henry with 16 wins and Forego with 14 wins. His winnings in stake money places him behind Winx Redzel Makybe Diva (GB), Sunline (NZ) and Northerly on the all-time Australasian list.

Tie the Knot was voted the 1999-2000 Australian Champion Stayer.

== Race record ==
1996-97 season as a two-year-old
Result	Date	Race	Venue	Group	Distance	Weight (kg)	Jockey	Winner/2nd
5th	17 Jun 1997	2yo Hcp Restricted	Warwick Farm	NA	1200 m	54	J. Sheehan	1st - Loophole
6th	09 Jul 1997	2yo Hcp Restricted	Warwick Farm	NA	1400 m	54	J. Sheehan	1st - Punt
Won	26 Jul 1997	2yo Hcp Restricted	Randwick	NA	1600 m	53	D. Beadman	2nd - Grey Maja

1997-98 season as a three-year-old
Result	Date	Race	Venue	Group	Distance	Weight (kg)	Jockey	Winner/2nd
4th	16 Aug 1997	3yo Hcp Restricted	Rosehill	NA	1200 m	52.5	R. Thompson	1st - Adam
2nd	30 Aug 1997	Peter Pan Stakes	Rosehill	G2	1500 m	55.5	D. Beadman	1st - On Air
Won	13 Sep 1997	Gloaming Stakes	Rosehill	G2	1900 m	55.5	D. Beadman	2nd - Irish Air
Won	27 Sep 1997	Dulcify Stakes	Randwick	LR	2000 m	57.5	D. Beadman	2nd - Spying
Won	04 Oct 1997	Spring Champion Stakes	Randwick	G1	2000 m	55.5	D. Beadman	2nd - Brave Prince
3rd	18 Oct 1997	Norman Robinson Stakes	Caulfield	LR	2000 m	57.5	D. Beadman	1st - Brave Prince
2nd	01 Nov 1997	Victoria Derby	Flemington	G1	2500 m	55.5	D. Beadman	1st - Second Coming
5th	14 Feb 1998	Expressway Stakes	Randwick	G2	1300 m	53	S. Dye	1st - Hockney
5th	28 Feb 1998	Hobartville Stakes	Warwick Farm	G2	1400 m	55.5	K. Moses	1st - Pleasure Giver
8th	14 Mar 1998	Canterbury Guineas	Rosehill	G1	1800 m	55.5	S. Dye	1st - Tycoon Lil
Won	28 Mar 1998	Rosehill Guineas	Rosehill	G1	2000 m	55.5	S. Dye	2nd - Tycoon Lil
2nd	11 Apr 1998	Australian Derby	Randwick	G1	2400 m	55.5	S. Dye	1st - Gold Guru
Won	18 Apr 1998	Sydney Cup	Randwick	G1	3200 m	50.5	S. Dye	2nd - Doriemus

1998-99 season as a four-year-old
Result	Date	Race	Venue	Group	Distance	Weight (kg)	Jockey	Winner/2nd
3rd	22 Aug 1998	Warwick Stakes	Warwick Farm	G2	1400 m	57.5	S. Dye	1st - What Can I Say
3rd	05 Sep 1998	Chelmsford Stakes	Randwick	G2	1600 m	57.5	S. Dye	1st - Might and Power
Won	20 Sep 1998	Underwood Stakes	Caulfield	G1	1800 m	57	S. Dye	2nd - Jezabeel
7th	03 Oct 1998	Turnbull Stakes	Flemington	G2	2000 m	57.5	P. Payne	1st - Aerosmith
3rd	17 Oct 1998	Caulfield Cup	Caulfield	G1	2400 m	55.5	S. Dye	1st - Taufan's Melody
5th	31 Oct 1998	Mackinnon Stakes	Flemington	G1	2000 m	57	S. Dye	1st - Champagne
6th	03 Nov 1998	Melbourne Cup	Flemington	G1	3200 m	55.5	S. Dye	1st - Jezabeel
3rd	06 Feb 1999	Expressway Stakes	Randwick	G2	1200 m	57.5	S. Dye	1st - Kidman's Cove
3rd	20 Feb 1999	Apollo Stakes	Warwick Farm	G2	1400 m	58	S. Dye	1st - Kidman's Cove
Won	27 Feb 1999	Chipping Norton Stakes	Warwick Farm	G1	1600 m	58	S. Dye	2nd - Forgotten Hero
2nd	13 Mar 1999	Ranvet Stakes	Rosehill	G1	2000 m	58	S. Dye	1st - Darazari
Won	27 Mar 1999	Mercedes Classic	Rosehill	G1	2400 m	57.5	S. Dye	2nd - Intergaze
Won	05 Apr 1999	Japan Plate	Randwick	LR	2000 m	60	S. Dye	2nd - Ear's Ronny
Won	10 Apr 1999	Sydney Cup	Randwick	G1	3200 m	57	S. Dye	2nd - Praise Indeed

1999-00 season as a five-year-old
Result	Date	Race	Venue	Group	Distance	Weight (kg)	Jockey	Winner/2nd
2nd	21 Aug 1999	Warwick Stakes	Warwick Farm	G2	1400 m	58	S. Dye	1st - Sunline
2nd	04 Sep 1999	Chelmsford Stakes	Randwick	G2	1600 m	58	S. Dye	1st - Intergaze
Won	18 Sep 1999	Hill Stakes	Rosehill	G2	1900 m	58	S. Dye	2nd - Joss Sticks
Won	02 Oct 1999	Craven Plate	Randwick	G3	2000 m	58	S. Dye	2nd - Arena
2nd	09 Oct 1999	Yalumba Stakes	Caulfield	G1	2000 m	58	S. Dye	1st - Northern Drake
2nd	23 Oct 1999	Cox Plate	Moonee Valley	G1	2040 m	58	S. Dye	1st - Sunline
8th	30 Oct 1999	Mackinnon Stakes	Flemington	G1	2000 m	58	S. Dye	1st - Rogan Josh
14th	02 Nov 1999	Melbourne Cup	Flemington	G1	3200 m	58	S. Dye	1st - Rogan Josh
8th	26 Feb 2000	Expressway Stakes	Randwick	G2	1200 m	57.5	S. Dye	1st - Mr Innocent
5th	11 Mar 2000	Apollo Stakes	Warwick Farm	G2	1400 m	58	S. Dye	1st - Sunline
Won	18 Mar 2000	Chipping Norton Stakes	Warwick Farm	G1	1600 m	58	S. Dye	2nd - Adam
Won	01 Apr 2000	Ranvet Stakes	Rosehill	G1	2000 m	58	S. Dye	2nd - Arena
Won	15 Apr 2000	Mercedes Classic	Rosehill	G1	2400 m	58	S. Dye	2nd - Arena
Won	29 Apr 2000	AJC St Leger	Randwick	G2	2600 m	58.5	S. Dye	2nd - Sharscay
9th	6 May 2000	Sydney Cup	Randwick	G1	3200 m	60	S. Dye	1st - Streak

2000-01 season as a six-year-old
Result	Date	Race	Venue	Group	Distance	Weight (kg)	Jockey	Winner/2nd
6th	09 Sep 2000	Theo Marks Stakes	Rosehill	G2	1300 m	60	D. Beadman	1st - Hire
2nd	23 Sep 2000	Bill Ritchie Handicap	Randwick	G3	1400 m	60	D. Beadman	1st - Landsighting
12th	02 Oct 2000	Epsom Handicap	Randwick	G1	1600 m	59.5	D. Beadman	1st - Shogun Lodge
3rd	14 Oct 2000	Yalumba Stakes	Caulfield	G1	2000 m	58	D. Beadman	1st - Sky Heights
9th	28 Oct 2000	Cox Plate	Moonee Valley	G1	2040 m	58	D. Beadman	1st - Sunline
Won	17 Feb 2001	Expressway Stakes	Randwick	G2	1200 m	57.5	P. Payne	2nd - Referral
4th	03 Mar 2001	Apollo Stakes	Warwick Farm	G2	1400 m	58	P. Payne	1st - Sunline
Won	10 Mar 2001	Chipping Norton Stakes	Randwick	G1	1600 m	58	P. Payne	2nd - Dottoressa
Won	24 Mar 2001	Ranvet Stakes	Rosehill	G1	2000 m	58	P. Payne	2nd - Hill of Grace
4th	07 Apr 2001	Mercedes Classic	Rosehill	G1	2400 m	58	P. Payne	1st - Curata Storm

2001-02 season as a seven-year-old
Result	Date	Race	Venue	Group	Distance	Weight (kg)	Jockey	Winner/2nd
6th	18 Aug 2001	Warwick Stakes	Warwick Farm	G2	1300 m	58	P. Payne	1st - Lonhro
14th	23 Sep 2001	Eat Well Live Well Cup	Caulfield	G1	1400 m	59	P. Payne	1st - Mr Murphy
4th	02 Feb 2002	Expressway Stakes	Randwick	G2	1200 m	57.5	P. Payne	1st - Ateates
3rd	16 Feb 2002	Apollo Stakes	Randwick	G2	1400 m	58	P. Payne	1st - Ha Ha
Won	23 Feb 2002	Chipping Norton Stakes	Warwick Farm	G1	1600 m	58	P. Payne	2nd - Freemason
5th	09 Mar 2002	Ranvet Stakes	Rosehill	G1	2000 m	58	P. Payne	1st - Universal Prince
5th	23 Mar 2002	The BMW Stakes	Rosehill	G1	2400 m	58	S. Dye	1st - Ethereal

== Pedigree ==
Pedigree of Tie The Knot (AUS), chestnut gelding, 1994
Sire Nassipour (USA) 1980	Blushing Groom (Fr); 1974	Red God (USA); 1954	Nasrullah (GB)
Sire Nassipour (USA) 1980	Blushing Groom (Fr); 1974	Red God (USA); 1954	Spring Run (USA)
Sire Nassipour (USA) 1980	Blushing Groom (Fr); 1974	Runaway Bride (GB); 1962	Wild Risk (Fr)
Sire Nassipour (USA) 1980	Blushing Groom (Fr); 1974	Runaway Bride (GB); 1962	Aimee (GB)
Sire Nassipour (USA) 1980	Alama (Ire); 1969	Aureole (GB); 1950	Hyperion (GB)
Sire Nassipour (USA) 1980	Alama (Ire); 1969	Aureole (GB); 1950	Angelola (GB)
Sire Nassipour (USA) 1980	Alama (Ire); 1969	Nucciolina (Fr); 1957	Nuccio (Ity)
Sire Nassipour (USA) 1980	Alama (Ire); 1969	Nucciolina (Fr); 1957	Mah Behar (GB)
Dam Whisked (Aus) 1987	Whiskey Road (USA); 1972	Nijinsky (Can); 1967	Northern Dancer (Can)
Dam Whisked (Aus) 1987	Whiskey Road (USA); 1972	Nijinsky (Can); 1967	Flaming Page (Can)
Dam Whisked (Aus) 1987	Whiskey Road (USA); 1972	Bowl of Flowers (USA); 1958	Sailor (USA)
Dam Whisked (Aus) 1987	Whiskey Road (USA); 1972	Bowl of Flowers (USA); 1958	Flower Bowl (USA)
Dam Whisked (Aus) 1987	That Is a Shame (Aus); 1981	Kaoru Star (Aus); 1965	Star Kingdom (Ire)
Dam Whisked (Aus) 1987	That Is a Shame (Aus); 1981	Kaoru Star (Aus); 1965	Kaoru (Aus)
Dam Whisked (Aus) 1987	That Is a Shame (Aus); 1981	Not Enough (Aus); 1975	Baguette (Aus)
Dam Whisked (Aus) 1987	That Is a Shame (Aus); 1981	Not Enough (Aus); 1975	Oodles (NZ), (Family: 18)

== See also ==
- List of leading Thoroughbred racehorses
- Repeat winners of horse races
