= 2005 Melbourne Cup =

Australian horse race

- Melbourne Cup
- Location: Flemington Racecourse; Melbourne, Australia
- Date: 1 November 2005
- Winning horse: Makybe Diva
- Jockey: Glen Boss
- Trainer: Lee Freedman
- Surface: Grass
- Attendance: 106,479

Here's Makybe Diva, a nation roars for a hero, she's starting to wind up. 300 left to go now, Makybe Diva's racing up, Envoy trying to go with her, they've got to Portland Singa and Lachlan River, here comes Leica Falcon and Xcellent. But Makybe Diva clear with 100 meters to go, Xcellent runs to second, On a Jeune runs on, but a champion becomes a legend! Makybe Diva has won it!

— Commentator Greg Miles describes the climax of the race

The 2005 Melbourne Cup was the 145th running of the Melbourne Cup, a prestigious Australian Thoroughbred horse race. The race, run over 3,200 metres (1.988 mi), was held on 1 November 2005 at Melbourne's Flemington Racecourse.

It was won by Makybe Diva at the age of seven, trained by Lee Freedman and ridden by Glen Boss. Makybe Diva broke her own weight carrying record by winning with 58 kg. Makybe Diva is the only horse to win three successive Melbourne Cups. Her retirement was announced with the third and final victory.

== Prize money ==
1st: $A3,700,000 2nd: $A750,000 3rd: $A375,000

== Field ==
Placing	Horse	Country	Trainer	Jockey	#	Barrier	Time/margin
1st	Makybe Diva	GB	Lee Freedman	Glen Boss	1	14	3:19.17
8th	Vinnie Roe	IRE	Dermot Weld (IRE)	Pat Smullen	2	24	5.5L
19th	Distinction	IRE	Michael Stoute (GB)	Michael Kinane	3	21	20.6L
17th	Greys Inn	USA	Mike De Kock (SAF)	Weichong Marwing	4	13	17.3L
Last	Franklins Gardens	GB	Mark Tompkins (GB)	Darryll Holland	5	10	99.9L
12th	Eye Popper	JPN	Izumi Shimizu (JPN)	Shinji Fujita	6	9	6.8L
14th	Railings	AUS	John Hawkes	Greg Childs	7	5	9.1L
3rd	Xcellent	NZ	Michael Moroney (NZ)	Michael Coleman	8	17	1.8L
9th	Kindjhal	FR	David Hayes	Dwayne Dunn	9	12	5.6L
21st	Hugs Dancer	FR	David Hayes	Nicholas Ryan	10	7	29.6L
13th	Demerger	AUS	Danny O'Brien	Blake Shinn	11	4	7.8L
11th	Dizelle	AUS	John Hawkes	Darren Beadman	12	18	6.7L
5th	Lachlan River	NZ	John Morrisey	Glen Colless	13	3	2.3L
6th	Portland Singa	NZ	Neville McBurney	Larry Cassidy	14	1	4.1L
15th	Vouvray	NZ	Peter Moody	Scott Seamer	15	15	9.3L
2nd	On a Jeune	AUS	Peter Montgomerie	Darren Gauci	16	11	1.3L
20th	Umbula	AUS	Mick Price	Stephen Baster	17	8	23.6L
22nd	Bazelle	NZ	Paul Jenkins (NZ)	Rhys McLeod	18	22	29.8L
7th	Envoy	NZ	Ken Kelso (NZ)	Peter Mertens	19	2	4.5L
10th	Rizon	AUS	Cliff Brown	Jay Ford	20	16	6.6L
18th	Strasbourg	AUS	Bart Cummings	Luke Nolen	21	6	17.8L
4th	Leica Falcon	AUS	Richard Freyer	Kerrin McEvoy	22	20	2.1L
23rd	Mr Celebrity	NZ	Gai Waterhouse	Danny Beasley	23	19	29.9L
16th	Kamsky	AUS	Bart Cummings	Craig Williams	24	23	14.3L

== Final moments ==
As they left the straight, round the turn and along the back straight it was:

1. 17 Umbula
2. 23 Mr Celebrity
3. 18 Bazelle
4. 14 Portland Singa

Changed to:

1. 23 Mr Celebrity
2. 18 Bazelle
3. 17 Umbula
4. 14 Portland Singa

Then:

1. 23 Mr Celebrity
2. 14 Portland Singa
3. 18 Bazelle
4. 17 Umbula

With about 1100m left to go it was:

1. 23 Mr Celebrity
2. 14 Portland Singa
3. 17 Umbula
4. 18 Bazelle

As they came to the turn:

1. 23 Mr Celebrity
2. 14 Portland Singa
3. 17 Umbula
4. 6 Eye Popper

Then:

1. 23 Mr Celebrity
2. 14 Portland Singa
3. 6 Eye Popper
4. 17 Umbula

With 500m left to go:

1. 14 Portland Singa
2. 23 Mr Celebrity
3. 6 Eye Popper
4. 13 Lachlan River

Final:

1. 1 Makybe Diva
2. 16 On a Jeune
3. 8 Xcellent
4. 22 Leica Falcon
