= 2004 Melbourne Cup =

Australian horse race

- Melbourne Cup
- Location: Flemington Racecourse; Melbourne, Australia
- Date: 2 November 2004
- Winning horse: Makybe Diva
- Jockey: Glen Boss
- Trainer: Lee Freedman
- Surface: Grass
- Attendance: 98,161

Zazzman at the 300 the leader, here comes Vinnie Roe, Elvstroem coming with him and Makybe Diva she's got right up on the inside Makybe Diva she's hit the front now from Vinnie Roe and Zazzman. It's Makybe Diva clear she's out by two lengths to Vinnie Roe. It's Makybe Diva clear and she's going to do what no mare has ever done! Makybe Diva wins it again.

— Commentator Greg Miles describes the climax of the race

The 2004 Melbourne Cup was the 144th running of the Melbourne Cup, a prestigious Australian Thoroughbred horse race. The race, run over 3,200 metres (1.988 mi), was held on 2 November 2004 at Melbourne's Flemington Racecourse.

It was won by Makybe Diva at the age of six, trained by Lee Freedman and ridden by Glen Boss.

== Field ==
This is a list of horses which ran in the 2004 Melbourne Cup.

Place	Number	Horse	Trainer	Jockey
1st	5	Makybe Diva (GB)	Lee Freedman	Glen Boss
2nd	1	Vinnie Roe (IRE)	Dermot Weld (IRE)	Pat Smullen
3rd	12	Zazzman	Tony Vasil	Nicholas Ryan
4th	3	Elvstroem	Tony Vasil	Nash Rawiller
5th	10	Hugs Dancer (FR)	Tony McEvoy	Greg Childs
6th	9	Distinction (IRE)	Sir Michael Stoute (GB)	Darren Beadman
7th	2	Mamool (IRE)	Saeed bin Suroor (UAE)	Frankie Dettori
8th	24	Catchmeifyoucan (NZ)	Michael Moroney (NZ)	Blake Shinn
9th	7	Razkalla (USA)	Saeed bin Suroor (UAE)	Kerrin McEvoy
10th	15	Strasbourg	Bart Cummings	Mark Du Plessis
11th	22	On A Jeune	Peter Montgomerie	Joe Bowditch
12th	6	Media Puzzle (USA)	Dermot Weld (IRE)	Damien Oliver
13th	13	Grey Song	Tommy Hughes Jnr.	Darren Beasley
14th	11	Roman Arch	Mick Whittle	Luke Currie
15th	20	Upsetthym (NZ)	Karen Fursdon (NZ)	Rhys McLeod
16th	18	Another Warrior	Alan Bailey	Jim Byrne
17th	23	Winning Belle (NZ)	Gai Waterhouse	Chris Munce
18th	14	Lashed	Graeme Rogerson (NZ)	Jim Cassidy
19th	4	Mummify	Lee Freedman	Danny Nikolic
20th	21	Don Raphael	Kerry Parker	Scott Seamer
21st	16	Pacific Dancer (NZ)	Shaun Dwyer	Gary Grylls
22nd	19	Hard To Get	Mark Kavanagh	Luke Nolen
23rd	8	Delzao	Greg Kavanagh	Steven King
Last	17	She's Archie	Darren Weir	Corey Brown
