= Reg Inglis =

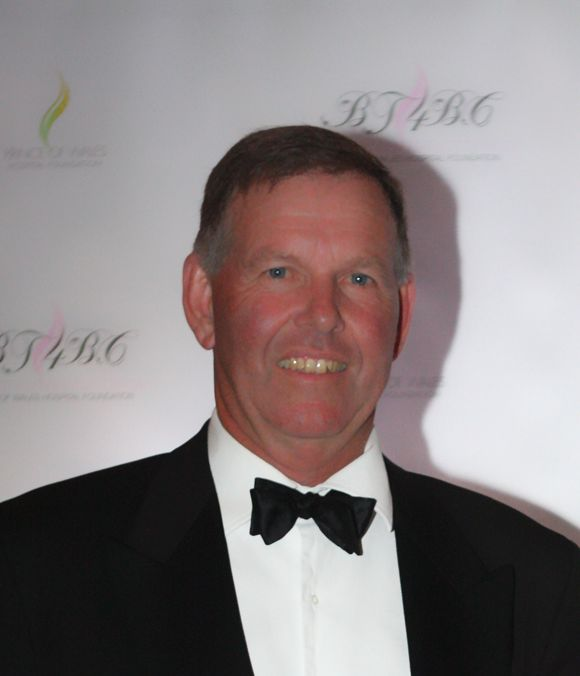
Reg Inglis, Chairman of the Prince of Wales Hospital Foundation, 2012

Reg Inglis is a bloodstock agent in Sydney, New South Wales, Australia. The Inglis family have been prominent as bloodstock agents since the nineteenth century.

== Bloodstock agent ==
Reg Inglis worked in the family firm of William Inglis & Son for 36 years including eighteen as managing director. In his time as Managing Director he held a number of important industry positions, including in the mid-1990s being a member of the Board of the Australian Jockey Club, the senior racing club in thoroughbred racing in Australia (now the Australian Turf Club). In his role as bloodstock agent he gained media coverage for association with notable people such as Robert Sangster. He played a significant role in saving the business of famous Australian trainer, Bart Cummings. Reg Inglis admitted, following Bart Cumming's death, that he had allowed Cummings to only repay $350,000 of a $14M debt owing to William Inglis and Son Pty Ltd. He was forced to resign as Managing Director in 2006 following a change in shareholding control between different parts of the family. In January 2008 he sold his own shareholding to Tattersalls, a U.K. based bloodstock agency. However, he continues to play a matchmaker role with sales in the bloodstock industry.

== Charity work ==
He was later Chairman of the Prince of Wales Hospital Foundation from 2010 to 2012.
