= Ming Dynasty (horse) =

Australian-bred Thoroughbred racehorse

Ming Dynasty (AUS)
- Sire: Planet Kingdom (AUS)
- Grandsire: Star Kingdom (IRE)
- Dam: Chow Mein (AUS)
- Damsire: Chris (GB)
- Sex: Gelding
- Foaled: 1973
- Country: Australia
- Colour: Grey
- Breeder: Lloyd Foyster
- Owner: Bart Cummings, Jacqueline Foyster, Ron Websdale et al.
- Trainer: Bart Cummings
- Record: 76: 17-12-9
- Earnings: A$547,425

Major wins
- Caulfield Cup (1977, 1980); Queen Elizabeth Stakes (1978); Metropolitan Handicap (1978); Australian Cup (1978, 1980)

Honours
- Ming Dynasty Quality at Rosehill Racecourse.
- Last updated on 27 December 2011

Ming Dynasty was a notable Australian Thoroughbred racehorse, who won the 1977 and 1980 Caulfield Cups.

== Background ==
He was sired by Planet Kingdom (AUS), his dam Chow Mein (AUS) was by Chris (GB).

Part owned and trained by Bart Cummings from 76 career starts he won 17 races.

== Racing career ==
As well as his two Caulfield Cups he also won two VRC Australian Cups (1978 and 1980), the 1978 AJC Queen Elizabeth Stakes and the Metropolitan Handicap in the same year.

As a seven-year-old in 1980 in the Caulfield Cup, starting at 50–1, the gelding carried 58 kg and beat Melbourne Cup winner, Hyperno, and champion Kingston Town to join an elite group to take two Caulfield Cups, the others being Rising Fast (1954–55), Whittier (1922–25), Uncle Sam (1912–1914), Poseidon (1906–07), Hymettus (1898–1901) and Paris (1892–1894).

== Retirement ==
When retired from racing he became a clerk of the course mount at AJC meetings.

He died 28 May 2002.
