= Nassipour =

American-bred Thoroughbred racehorse

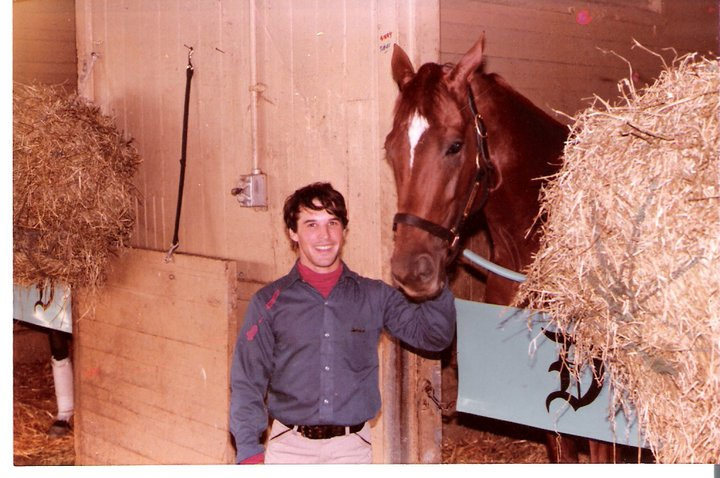
- Nassipour with his exercise rider, 1985
- Sire: Blushing Groom (FR)
- Grandsire: Red God
- Dam: Alama (IRE)
- Damsire: Aureole
- Sex: Stallion
- Foaled: 1980
- Died: 7 May 1994 (aged 13–14)
- Country: United States
- Colour: Chestnut
- Breeder: Aga Khan IV
- Owner: Dogwood Stable
- Trainer: Stephen A. DiMauro
- Record: 45: 7-10-8
- Earnings: US$829,519

Major wins
- Dixie Handicap (1985); Rothmans International Stakes (1985); Seneca Handicap (1985)

Awards
- Leading sire in Australia (1992)
- Last updated on 1 October 2011

Nassipour (1980 – 7 May 1994) was an American Thoroughbred racehorse and a Leading sire in Australia. He was bred in Kentucky by the Aga Khan. His sire, Blushing Groom, was the 1977 European Champion Three-Year-old and the 1989 Leading sire in Great Britain & Ireland. Nassipour's dam was Alama, a daughter of the very good runner Aureole, who was owned by Queen Elizabeth II. Aureole's wins include the 1954 Coronation Cup and King George VI and Queen Elizabeth Stakes. At stud, Aureole sired 1960 Epsom Derby winner, St. Paddy.

== Racing career ==
Nassipour was sent to his owner's training facility in Ireland at age two but was sold in late 1983 to American Cot Campbell for his Dogwood Stable racing partnership. Brought back to North America for the 1984 turf racing season, Nassipour did not have a Graded stakes race win but ran second in the Grade I (G1) Sword Dancer Invitational Handicap, G3 Knickerbocker Handicap, and G1 Bowling Green Handicap. He also finished third in the G3 American Handicap.

At age five in 1985, Nassipour had his best year in racing, winning the G2 Dixie Handicap at Pimlico Race Course in Baltimore, Maryland, and the G3 Seneca Handicap at Saratoga Race Course in New York. In the richest and most important race of his career, under jockey Jean-Luc Samyn Nassipour won the $600,000 G1 Rothmans International Stakes at Woodbine Racetrack in Toronto, Canada, defeating, among others, Grand Prix de Paris winner Sumayr and Irish 2,000 Guineas victor Triptych. Nassipour finished second in the G3 Niagara Stakes, G2 Bougainvillea Handicap, and G3 Fair Grounds Classic. In the G3 Pan American Handicap, he was third.

Nassipour's best result at age six was a third in the Seneca Handicap.

== Stud record ==
Retired from racing in 1986, Nassipour was sold to New Zealand breeding interests and stood at stud at Ra Ora Stud until his death in 1994. He was the Leading sire in Australia in 1992. Among Nassipour's best progeny were these Group one winners:

- Grooming, won Brisbane Cup
- Let's Elope - Melbourne Cup winner and 1992 Australian Champion Racehorse of the Year.
- Lord Revenir, won AJC Metropolitan Handicap
- Marble Halls, won VATC Toorak Handicap
- Redding, won Victoria Derby
- Shiva's Revenge, won South Australian Derby
- Tie the Knot - won 13 Group One races, including four consecutive runnings of the Group One Chipping Norton Stakes, 2000 Australian Champion Stayer.

== Pedigree ==
Pedigree of Nassipour (USA), chestnut stallion, 1980
Sire Blushing Groom (FR) 1974	Red God (USA); 1954	Nasrullah	Nearco
Sire Blushing Groom (FR) 1974	Red God (USA); 1954	Nasrullah	Mumtaz Begum
Sire Blushing Groom (FR) 1974	Red God (USA); 1954	Spring Run	Menow
Sire Blushing Groom (FR) 1974	Red God (USA); 1954	Spring Run	Boola Brook
Sire Blushing Groom (FR) 1974	Runaway Bride	Wild Risk	Rialto
Sire Blushing Groom (FR) 1974	Runaway Bride	Wild Risk	Wild Violet
Sire Blushing Groom (FR) 1974	Runaway Bride	Aimee	Tudor Minstrel
Sire Blushing Groom (FR) 1974	Runaway Bride	Aimee	Emali
Dam Alama (IRE) 1969	Aureole	Hyperion	Gainsborough
Dam Alama (IRE) 1969	Aureole	Hyperion	Selene
Dam Alama (IRE) 1969	Aureole	Angelola	Donatello
Dam Alama (IRE) 1969	Aureole	Angelola	Feola
Dam Alama (IRE) 1969	Nucciolina	Nuccio	Traghetto
Dam Alama (IRE) 1969	Nucciolina	Nuccio	Nuvoletta
Dam Alama (IRE) 1969	Nucciolina	Mah Behar	Bois Roussel
Dam Alama (IRE) 1969	Nucciolina	Mah Behar	Mah Iran
