= On A Jeune =

Australian-bred Thoroughbred racehorse

On A Jeune (foaled 22 September 2000) is an Australian-bred thoroughbred racehorse. His sire is the British racehorse Jeune, and his dam is Chandada Rose.

On A Jeune ran second in the 2005 Melbourne Cup behind three-time winner, champion mare, Makybe Diva. He is also notable for running second in the 2004 South Australian Derby, behind Hard To Get. His biggest victory came in the 2005 Geelong Cup when jockey Kerrin McEvoy partnered the gelding. Second biggest victory came in the 2009 Cooper Pedy cup when nephew of trainer Peter Montgomerie and son of successful Port Lincoln trainer Graeme Montgomerie, Zane Montgomerie rode him in thrilling fashion to secure Zane's first and only ride of his career.
