= Rose of Kingston =

Australian-bred Thoroughbred racehorse

- Sire: Claude
- Grandsire: Hornbeam
- Dam: Kingston Rose
- Damsire: Better Boy
- Sex: Mare
- Foaled: 1978
- Country: Australia
- Colour: Chestnut
- Owner: David Hains
- Trainer: Robert E. Hoysted
- Record: 10 wins
- Earnings: A$591,660

Major wins
- Champagne Stakes (1981); Coolmore Stud Stakes (1981); Crown Oaks (1981); Australasian Oaks (1982); Australian Derby (1982); Coongy Handicap (1982); Craiglee Stakes (1982)

Awards
- Australian Horse of the Year (1982); Australasian Champion 3-Year-Old Filly (1982); Australasian Champion Older Mare (1982)

Honours
- Rose of Kingston Stakes

Rose of Kingston (1978 - 2002) was a Thoroughbred mare who raced with success in Australia, particularly as a three-year-old. She was the Australian Horse of the Year and Australasian Champion Three-Year-Old Filly and Australasian Champion Older Mare in 1982, and after retiring from racing became a broodmare.

She had ten career wins including three Group one races.

Rose of Kingston was the dam of the Melbourne Cup winner Kingston Rule by the American Triple Crown winner, Secretariat. Rose of Kingston was retired from stud duties in 2000 and lived at Kingston Park until her death in June 2002.

The Rose of Kingston Stakes raced at Flemington is named after her.

== Breeding record ==
Following her retirement from racing, Rose of Kingston became a broodmare at Kingston Park Stud. Her offspring included horses bred to several internationally prominent stallions, including Secretariat, Nureyev and Seattle Slew. According to a 2001 New Zealand Bloodstock sales catalogue, she produced nine foals, seven of which raced and five of which became winners.

Among her other offspring was Rose of Portland, a daughter of Seattle Slew who achieved success in stakes races. Rose of Kingston also produced Kingsttenham, a son of Nureyev foaled in 1991. Her breeding record contributed to the continuation of the Kingston Park bloodline beyond her own racing achievements.
