= Kingston Rule =

American-bred Thoroughbred racehorse

- Sire: Secretariat
- Grandsire: Bold Ruler
- Dam: Rose of Kingston
- Damsire: Claude
- Sex: Stallion
- Foaled: 18 March 1986
- Died: 3 December 2011 (aged 25)
- Country: United States
- Colour: Chestnut
- Breeder: David H. Hains
- Owner: Mr. & Mrs. David H. Hains
- Trainer: Bart Cummings
- Record: 18: 4-4-2
- Earnings: A$1,549,125

Major wins
- VATC Tommy Woodcock Handicap; VATC H A Currie Handicap; Moonee Valley Cup (1990); Melbourne Cup (1990)

Kingston Rule (March 18, 1986 – December 3, 2011), was an American-bred racehorse who raced in Australia, where he won the 1990 Melbourne Cup in a record time of 3:16:3. This time still stands as the record today.

Bred and raced by Victoria's David H. Hains, who had bred Kingston Town, Kingston Rule was sired by the famed U.S. Triple Crown Champion Secretariat and, out of the 1982 Australian Horse of the Year, Rose of Kingston.

He was initially trained in France by Patrick Biancone but only raced once there. He then came to Australia and initially trained by Tommy Smith but was unimpressive.

In the Spring of 1989, Kingston Rule was moved to the stables of Bart Cummings. He won two races at Sandown over a mile and was later placed second in the Carlyon Cup at Caulfield to Marwong.

He ran in a number of feature races to qualify for the Caulfield and Melbourne Cups but without any wins:

- 7th in the Australian Cup won by Vo Rogue.
- 5th in the Memsie Stakes won by The Phantom.
- 4th in the Craiglee Stakes won by Zabeel.
- 2nd in the Coongy Handicap, Caulfield, won by Kessem.

After not qualifying for the Caulfield Cup, he was finally successful in the Moonee Valley Gold Cup in record time, ridden by Jim Cassidy

Bart Cummings and David Hains did not wish to wait for Cassidy or Michael Clarke who were both offered the ride on Kingston Rule in the 1990 Melbourne Cup to commit. The horse was unable to get a start in the Mackinnon Stakes and he was ridden by young Sydney jockey, Darren Beadman in the Hotham Handicap for second.

Beadman again rode him in his Melbourne Cup win ahead of the New Zealand horses The Phantom (Murray Baker, G Cooksley) and Mr Brooker (Peter Hurdle, Greg Childs) in a race record time.

After placing third in both the St George Stakes and Blamey Stakes to Better Loosen Up and Sydeston respectively he suffered an injury to his tendons and never returned to his best.

== Stud career ==
He entered stud in 1991, and as of the end of 2009 has sired 91 winners, including 4 stakes winners.

=== Notable progeny ===
c = colt, f = filly, g = gelding

| Foaled | Name | Sex | Major wins |
| 1994 | Kensington Palace | f | Crown Oaks |
| 1994 | Sheer Kingston | g | Adelaide Cup, Brisbane Cup |

== Death ==
Kingston Rule died at Ealing Park, Euroa, Victoria, in December 2011.
