= Jeune =

British-bred Thoroughbred racehorse

- Sire: Kalaglow
- Grandsire: Kalamoun
- Dam: Youthful
- Damsire: Green Dancer
- Sex: Stallion
- Foaled: 29 March 1989
- Died: 4 January 2006 (aged 16)
- Country: Great Britain
- Colour: Chestnut
- Breeder: Sir Robin McAlpine
- Owner: Shadwell Racing
- Trainer: Geoff Wragg (UK); David A. Hayes (AUS)
- Record: 42: 10-10-7
- Earnings: US$2,935,467

Major wins
- September Stakes (1992); Hardwicke Stakes (1993); Underwood Stakes (1994); Melbourne Cup (1994); AJC Queen Elizabeth Stakes (1995); C F Orr Stakes (1995); Craiglee Stakes (1995)

Awards
- Australian Horse of the Year (1994-95)
- Last updated on 23 June 2007

Jeune (29 March 1989 – 4 January 2006) was a British Thoroughbred racehorse who raced in England and Australia and is best known for winning the prestigious Melbourne Cup in 1994. He was a muscular chestnut stallion who sometimes raced in pacifiers. He had an aversion towards wet ground and was most effective on ground which was at least dead.

== European career ==
Reasonably well-bred and bred for stamina, Jeune was by Kalaglow out of Youthful, by Green Dancer. He began his racing career in Europe, becoming a Group Two winner over a mile and a half, as well as running several good placings in English middle-distance races of the second rank. His owner, Sheikh Hamdan bin Rashid Al Maktoum, sent him to Australia at the end of his 4-year-old season, where he was trained by David Hayes.

== Australian career ==
Jeune established himself as a top-class performer in Australia with his victory in the Underwood Stakes (1800 metres) at Caulfield in the early part of the spring. Later that same preparation, he was runner-up in the Caulfield Stakes and the Mackinnon Stakes. In between time, he ran unplaced in the Cox Plate when hindered in the running. Jeune therefore entered the 1994 Melbourne Cup with solid middle-distance weight-for-age form. Nevertheless, he started at odds of 16/1 due to doubts about whether he would run the distance. He won by 2 lengths, while favoured Caulfield Cup winner Paris Lane, who had narrowly beaten him home in the Mackinnon three days earlier, was second.

Jeune opened his autumn campaign by winning the much shorter group 1 C.F. Orr Stakes (1400 metres) against sprinters. He also won the Queen Elizabeth Stakes (2000 metres) to finish that campaign. However, in between time, Jeune developed the tendency of running second in major races. One of these efforts a close second to champion sprinter Schillaci in the Futurity Stakes over 1400 metres. He also lost the Australian Cup at Flemington to the Western Australian mare Starstruck, and the Rawson Stakes and The BMW at Rosehill to front-runner Stony Bay.

Jeune raced on as a 6-year-old, and despite an early-season victory over Mahogany in the Craiglee Stakes (1600 metres) at Flemington, he thereafter lost form, failing in several major races. In the end, Jeune's overall racing record in Australia and England stood at 10 wins and 17 placing from 42 starts, and nearly A$3million in prizemoney.

== Stud record ==
Jeune began his stud career at Hayes' Lindsay Park property in South Australia before transferring to Collingrove Stud in Victoria in 2004.

Chief among Jeune's successful offspring was the ill-fated 2003 Caulfield Cup winner Mummify and On A Jeune, who ran second in the Melbourne Cup. He also sired Jeune Mark (so named because he closely resembled his sire), who won over $200,000 in prizes. Jeune Mark was made famous after saving his owner's life in the 2009 Black Saturday bushfires in Victoria. Despite his very good race record and ability to sire good progeny, Jeune was not the most commercial of stallions in Australia. The quality of mares he attracted in South Australia was only moderate and did not match those enjoyed by the more fashionable overseas shuttle stallions and speed-oriented locals, with whom he was competing. Nevertheless, over 5% of his runners won stakes races.

On the morning of 4 January 2006, Jeune was found dead in his paddock at Collingrove Stud from an apparent heart failure.

== See also ==
- List of Melbourne Cup winners
