= Let's Elope =

New Zealand-bred Thoroughbred racehorse

- Sire: Nassipour
- Grandsire: Blushing Groom
- Dam: Sharon Jane
- Damsire: Battle-Waggon
- Sex: Mare
- Foaled: 20 November 1987; Hamilton, New Zealand
- Died: 11 September 2016 (aged 28); Euroa, Victoria, Australia
- Country: New Zealand
- Colour: Chestnut
- Breeder: Highview Stud
- Owner: Fleiter family Dennis Marks and Kevin White (1991)
- Trainer: Dave O'Sullivan; Bart Cummings
- Record: 26: 11-0-5
- Earnings: A$2,940,250 - NZ$42,925 - US$169,000

Major wins
- Caulfield Cup (1991); Melbourne Cup (1991); LKS MacKinnon Stakes (1991); Turnbull Stakes (1991); Australian Cup (1992); C F Orr Stakes (1992); St George Stakes (1992)

Awards
- Australian Champion Racehorse of the Year (1992)

Honours
- Australian Racing Hall of Fame; Let's Elope Stakes
- Last updated on 18 June 2007

Let's Elope (20 November 1987 – 11 September 2016) was a Champion Thoroughbred racehorse in Australia.

== Background ==
Bred by Highview Stud in Hamilton, New Zealand, Let's Elope was a giant chestnut mare who in 1991 became the first mare in more than 50 years to complete Australia's famed Caulfield Cup - Melbourne Cup double (the "Cups double"). The last mare to complete the double had been Rivette in 1939.

By the Blushing Groom stallion Nassipour, out of Sharon Jane, she was a NZ$16,000 purchase at the 1989 New Zealand Magic Millions sale. Originally trained by Dave O'Sullivan for the Fleiter family, she was un-raced as a two-year-old but won her first start as a three-year-old in 1990. Despite showing above-average ability, her record in New Zealand was underwhelming, and, on the advice of her trainer, the owners accepted a NZ$150,000 offer for her. Her new owners, Dennis Marks and Kevin White, transferred her to the Australian stables of the "Cups King", Bart Cummings.

== Racing career ==
Let's Elope was close-up in her first two starts for Cummings, and, while down the track in the wet at Caulfield, was a different horse on top of the ground. In a superb season, Let's Elope began a seven-race winning streak in the Turnbull Stakes, on the first weekend of October, took the Mackinnon Stakes and both the Cups, and returned in the new year for the Orr Stakes, the St George Stakes, and the Australian Cup, in course record time, on Labour Day in March. A fetlock injury then cut short her season, but Let's Elope had the 1992 Horse of the Year Award in her keeping.

She returned at five, and, while thwarted by wet tracks for much of the spring, won a match race with Better Loosen Up at Caulfield and was narrowly defeated by Super Impose in a classic Cox Plate (after the race, she was relegated from second to fifth for cutting off the unlucky Better Loosen Up). Ten days later, Let's Elope was one of three scratchings from the Melbourne Cup. After a bleeding attack in the Japan Cup, Let's Elope continued her career in the United States.

Conditioned in the U.S. by U.S. Racing Hall of Fame inductee Ron McAnally, Let's Elope won a minor race on debut, and was first past the post in the Grade I Beverly D. Stakes in front of Flawlessly before being relegated to third - under American rules, she was relegated for simply causing interference, not because the third horse would have beaten her home. The recurrence of a bleeding attack and a fractured cannon bone forced her retirement at the close of 1993.

At stud, Let's Elope had visited some of the world's greatest stallions, including Storm Cat, and, while considered slightly disappointing, has produced the stakeswinner Ustinov (by Seeking The Gold), who was placed in a number of Group One races and Outback Joe (by Elvstroem) winner of the 2014 Adelaide Cup.

=== Death ===
Let's Elope died in her sleep on 12 September 2016 at Lauriston Park, Euroa, Victoria, Australia.

== Group 1 wins ==
Year	Race	Track	Distance (m)	Weight (kg)	Time	Jockey
1991	VATC Caulfield Cup	Caulfield	2400	48.5	2:30.30	Steven King
1991	VRC Mackinnon Stakes	Flemington	2000	54.5	2:01.80	Steven King
1991	VRC Melbourne Cup	Flemington	3200	51.0	3:18.90	Steven King
1992	VRC Australian Cup	Flemington	2000	55.5	2:00.00	Darren Beadman

== Group 2 wins ==
Year	Race	Track	Distance (m)	Weight (kg)	Time	Jockey
1991	VRC Turnbull Stakes	Flemington	2000	50.0	2:01.90	Steven King
1992	VATC C.F.Orr Stakes	Sandown	1400	55.5	1:22.00	Steven King
1992	VATC St George Stakes	Caulfield	1800	55.5	1:48.50	Steven King

== Group 3 wins ==
Year	Race	Track	Distance (m)	Weight (kg)	Time	Jockey
1991	MaRC Centaine Stakes	Awapuni (NZ)	2000	55.0	2:03.04	Darrel Lang

== See also ==
- Thoroughbred racing in Australia
- Thoroughbred racing in New Zealand
