= Saintly =

Australian-bred Thoroughbred racehorse

- Sire: Sky Chase
- Grandsire: Star Way
- Dam: All Grace
- Damsire: Sir Tristram
- Sex: Gelding
- Foaled: 21 September 1992
- Died: 16 December 2016 (aged 24)
- Country: Australia
- Colour: Chestnut
- Breeder: Bart Cummings
- Owner: Bart Cummings & Dato Tan Chin Nam
- Trainer: Bart Cummings
- Record: 23: 10–8–3
- Earnings: A$3,851,765

Major wins
- Australian Cup (1996); W S Cox Plate (1996); Melbourne Cup (1996); C F Orr Stakes (1997)

Honours
- Australian Champion Racehorse of the Year (1997); Australian Racing Hall of Fame (2017)
- Last updated on 17 May 2017

Saintly (21 September 1992 – 16 December 2016) was an Australian Thoroughbred racehorse who was named Australia's champion racehorse in 1997. A giant chestnut gelding by Sky Chase out of All Grace (by Sir Tristram), he was bred by his trainer, Bart Cummings, who owned him in partnership with a Malaysian businessman, Dato Tan Chin Nam. In 2017 Saintly was inducted to the Australian Racing Hall of Fame.

Saintly gained the moniker 'The horse from heaven' due to his name and his partnership with jockey Darren Beadman, who at the time was a proclaimed born-again Christian.

== Race career ==
Saintly broke his maiden as a two-year-old, on 19 April 1995, and returned in the latter part of the spring, at three, where he won three races, including the Listed Carbine Club Stakes at Flemington. He opened the new year by defeating the well-performed Juggler in the Expressway Stakes, and won the Australian Cup two starts later. He was then placed behind Octagonal in the Rosehill Guineas, the Mercedes Classic, and the Australian Derby, and finished in front of Nothin' Leica Dane and Filante, in what was considered a vintage crop of three-year-olds.

At four, Saintly was runner-up to Filante in the Warwick and the Chelmsford Stakes, won the Hill Stakes at his third run back, and was surprisingly defeated by Adventurous, Hula Flight, and Nothin' Leica Dane in the Craven Plate and The Metropolitan. In Melbourne, however, he found his best form. He charged home to beat Filante in the Cox Plate and backed up 10 days later for an easy win in the Melbourne Cup. He was just the fourth horse to complete the double in the same year, following Nightmarch (1929), Phar Lap (1930), and Rising Fast (1954), and preceding Makybe Diva (2005).

After missing the Japan Cup through illness, Saintly returned in the Orr Stakes, and came from well back on the home turn to defeat Cut Up Rough. Bart Cummings declared Saintly hadn't yet reached his peak as a racehorse, but he broke down without racing again. Over the next 18 months, Cummings made several attempts to get Saintly back to the track, but without success, and he was retired in July 1998.

== Retirement ==
Saintly originally resided at Living Legends, the international home of rest for champion horses (open to the public) in Greenvale, Melbourne, Australia, but as of February 2007, Saintly had returned home to Bart Cummings' Princes Farm in New South Wales.

Saintly died at the age of 24 on 16 December 2016.

== Race record ==
1994–95 season as a two-year-old
Result	Date	Race	Venue	Group	Distance	Weight (kg)	Jockey	Winner/2nd
6th	13 Mar 1995	Yootha Hcp	Canterbury	NA	1200 m	54	J. Sheehan	1st – Reload
Won	19 Apr 1995	Parry-Oakden Hcp	Randwick	NA	1200 m	52	L. Cropp	2nd – Silver Sheik
3rd	13 May 1995	2yo Hcp Restricted	Rosehill	NA	1500 m	54	J. Sheehan	1st – Renaissance Prince
4th	3 Jun 1995	Hyundai Hcp	Rosehill	NA	1300 m	53	L. Beasley	1st – Quick Flick

1995–96 season as a three-year-old
Result	Date	Race	Venue	Group	Distance	Weight (kg)	Jockey	Winner/2nd
Won	23 Sep 1995	No Age Restriction Hcp	Newcastle	NA	1200 m	57	D. McLellan	2nd – Blue Valley
2nd	7 Oct 1995	3yo Hcp Restricted	Warwick Farm	NA	1200 m	55.5	J. Marshall	1st – Wavertree
Won	21 Oct 1995	3yo Hcp Restricted	Randwick	NA	1400 m	55.5	J. Marshall	2nd – Kidlat
Won	4 Nov 1995	Carbine Club Stakes	Flemington	LR	1600 m	53	D. Beadman	2nd – Brackenbury
2nd	18 Nov 1995	Sandown Guineas	Sandown	G2	1600 m	55.5	D. Beadman	1st – Peep on the Sly
Won	10 Feb 1996	Expressway Stakes	Rosehill	G2	1200 m	53.5	L. Cassidy	2nd – Juggler
2nd	24 Feb 1996	Apollo Stakes	Warwick Farm	G2	1400 m	53	J. Powell	1st – Juggler
Won	11 Mar 1996	Australian Cup	Flemington	G1	2000 m	52.5	D. Beadman	2nd – Vialli
2nd	23 Mar 1996	Rosehill Guineas	Rosehill	G1	2000 m	55.5	P. Payne	1st – Octagonal
3rd	30 Mar 1996	Mercedes Classic	Rosehill	G1	2400 m	52	P. Payne	1st – Octagonal
2nd	6 Apr 1996	Australian Derby	Randwick	G1	2400 m	55.5	L. Cassidy	1st – Octagonal

1996–97 season as a four-year-old
Result	Date	Race	Venue	Group	Distance	Weight (kg)	Jockey	Winner/2nd
2nd	25 Aug 1996	Warwick Stakes	Warwick Farm	G2	1400 m	57	D. Beadman	1st – Filante
2nd	7 Sep 1996	Chelmsford Stakes	Randwick	G2	1600 m	57	D. Beadman	1st – Filante
Won	21 Sep 1996	Hill Stakes	Rosehill	G2	1900 m	57	D. Beadman	2nd – Nothin' Leica Dane
2nd	5 Oct 1996	Craven Plate	Randwick	G3	2000 m	57	D. Beadman	1st – Adventurous
3rd	7 Oct 1996	Metropolitan Handicap	Randwick	G1	2600 m	54.5	D. Beadman	1st – Hula Flight
Won	26 Oct 1996	Cox Plate	Moonee Valley	G1	2040 m	57	D. Beadman	2nd – Filante
Won	5 Nov 1996	Melbourne Cup	Flemington	G1	3200 m	55.5	D. Beadman	2nd – Count Chivas
Won	8 Feb 1997	C F Orr Stakes	Caulfield	G1	1400 m	57	D. Beadman	2nd – Cut Up Rough

== Pedigree ==
Pedigree of Saintly (AUS), chestnut gelding 1992
Sire Sky Chase (NZ) 1984	Star Way (GB); 1977	Star Appeal (Ire); 1970	Appiani (Ity)
Sire Sky Chase (NZ) 1984	Star Way (GB); 1977	Star Appeal (Ire); 1970	Sterna (Ger)
Sire Sky Chase (NZ) 1984	Star Way (GB); 1977	New Way (GB); 1970	Klairon (Fr)
Sire Sky Chase (NZ) 1984	Star Way (GB); 1977	New Way (GB); 1970	New Move (GB)
Sire Sky Chase (NZ) 1984	Vice Reine (NZ); 1977	Amalgam (USA); 1972	Damascus (USA)
Sire Sky Chase (NZ) 1984	Vice Reine (NZ); 1977	Amalgam (USA); 1972	Charming Alibi (USA)
Sire Sky Chase (NZ) 1984	Vice Reine (NZ); 1977	Kind Regards (NZ); 1966	Le Filou (Fr)
Sire Sky Chase (NZ) 1984	Vice Reine (NZ); 1977	Kind Regards (NZ); 1966	Waft (NZ)
Dam All Grace (NZ) 1985	Sir Tristram (Ire); 1971	Sir Ivor (USA); 1965	Sir Gaylord (USA)
Dam All Grace (NZ) 1985	Sir Tristram (Ire); 1971	Sir Ivor (USA); 1965	Attica (USA)
Dam All Grace (NZ) 1985	Sir Tristram (Ire); 1971	Isolt (USA); 1961	Round Table (USA)
Dam All Grace (NZ) 1985	Sir Tristram (Ire); 1971	Isolt (USA); 1961	All My Eye (GB)
Dam All Grace (NZ) 1985	Ziegfield Lass (Aus); 1980	Showdown (GB); 1961	Infatuation (GB)
Dam All Grace (NZ) 1985	Ziegfield Lass (Aus); 1980	Showdown (GB); 1961	Zanzara (GB)
Dam All Grace (NZ) 1985	Ziegfield Lass (Aus); 1980	Salote (Aus); 1971	Mariner (GB)
Dam All Grace (NZ) 1985	Ziegfield Lass (Aus); 1980	Salote (Aus); 1971	Dark Queen (Aus)

== See also ==
- List of Melbourne Cup winners
