= Darren Gauci =

Australian professional jockey (born 1965)

Personal information
- Nickname: The Gauch
- Born: 26 December 1965 (age 60) Melbourne, Australia
- Spouse: Karen Gauci (née Dunkerton)

Sport
- Sport: Professional jockey
- Updated on 22 April 2013

Darren Gauci (born 26 December 1965, in Melbourne, Australia) is a former Australian jockey.

== Racing career ==
Gauci was one of Australia's most successful and durable jockeys. He won the Senior Victorian Jockeys Premiership in 1983–84, 1985–86 and 1990–91. He came close to winning Australian racing's greatest prize on three occasions, with seconds in the Melbourne Cup on Chagemar (1984), Super Impose (1989) and On A Jeune (2005).

Gauci won 35 Group 1 races. For several years, Gauci also rode with great success in Hong Kong. Gauci won five races on trainer Lee Freedman's champion Super Impose, including an Epsom Handicap (1990), and rode Lonhro to victory in the Caulfield Guineas (2001) and the St George Stakes (2004) in his two rides on the "black flash". In an extensive association with trainer John Hawkes, he also won The Thousand Guineas on Shame (1995), a Doncaster Handicap on Over (2000) and a Stradbroke Handicap on Crawl (2001), but the partnership was terminated in 2005. At the 2005 and 2006 Spring Carnivals in Melbourne, Gauci won a feature race on El Segundo, and was narrowly beaten in the Cox Plate.

Over the years, Gauci had a number of bad riding injuries. For example, when he was in his early twenties, Gauci fell at Yarra Glen races and slipped in and out of a coma for eight days. In June 2011, at Mornington racecourse, the horse he was riding had a heart attack under him, crashed through the running rail, collapsed and died. Darren suffered severe injuries and he did not recommence riding for ten months.

Despite his experience and skill, Gauci had fewer rides on prominent horses towards the end of his career. He said, "As you get older it's a little bit harder, people put you on the back-burner a bit, they say you've been there, done that, probably had enough ... I still love riding – I just do a lot more of it now, it's every day, and night." At Wodonga on 2 June 2013, Gauci rode a 'treble'.

As at 14 December 2013, Gauci had ridden in 7048 races and been placed in 1904 races including 669 wins. Total prize money won by horses ridden by Gauci was almost $36 million. Gauci retired from riding in February 2017 to take up a role as apprentice jockey coach with Racing Victoria. At his final race meeting, Gauci rode a $17 winner, the aptly named Goodwill, for owner Lloyd Williams.

== Personal life ==
Gauci is of Maltese origin. He is married to Karen (formerly Karen Dunkerton) whom he met when he made a guest appearance on the television show Young Talent Time in 1983. Karen was a member of the Young Talent Time team at that time and the 'starlet and the jockey' story created significant local media interest. They married in 1989 and have four children, Jade, Breanna, Sean and Brooke.

In 2000, a portrait of Gauci was hung in the Archibald Prize competition. His biography, The Gauch, written by Kristen Manning, was published by Melbourne Books in 2018.
