= Darren Beadman =

Australian champion jockey

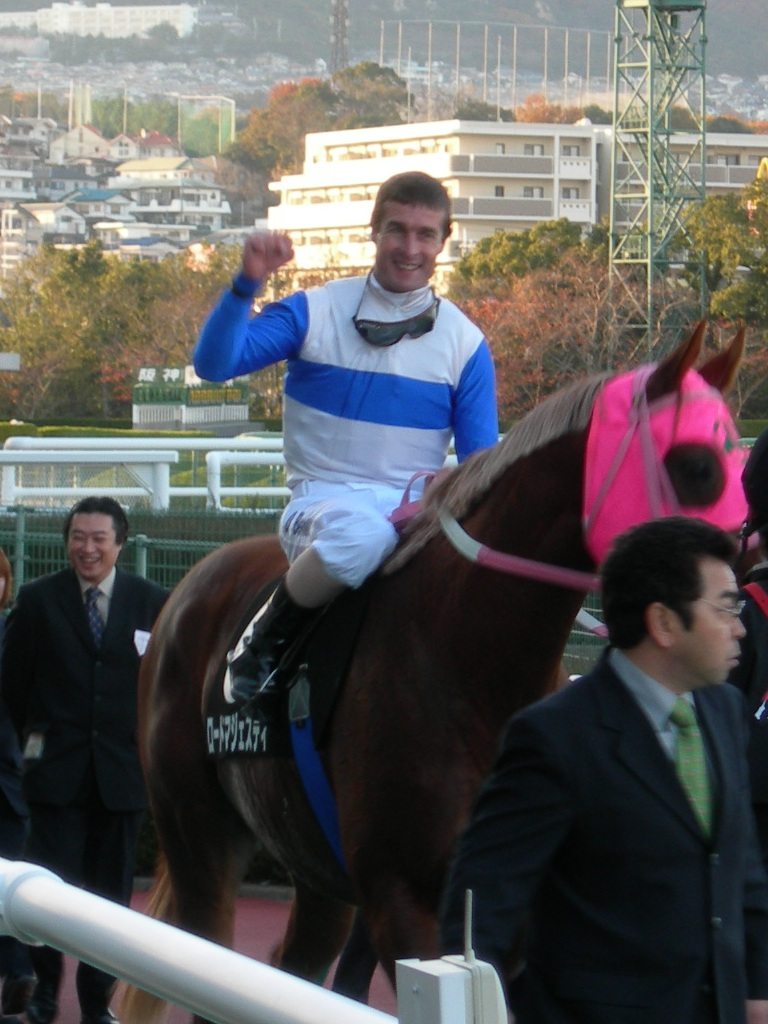

Personal information
- Nationality: Australian
- Born: 17 November 1965 (age 60) Canberra, Australia
- Occupations: Jockey, trainer

Horse racing career
- Sport: Horse racing
- Career wins: Melbourne Cup x2; W.S. Cox Plate; Doncaster Handicap/Epsom Handicap double; Australian Cup; Golden Slipper Stakes; Hong Kong Derby

Honours
- Australian Racing Hall of Fame

Significant horses
- Kingston Rule; Saintly; Octagonal; Lonhro; Super Impose

Darren Beadman (born 17 November 1965) is an Australian champion jockey. In 2007 at age 41 he was the youngest jockey ever to be inducted into the Australian Racing Hall of Fame, being the first to do so while still active in the industry.

== Early career ==
Beadman first gained notice while winning the Sydney apprentice jockeys' title in his first season of 1982–83, managing to finish second in 1983-84 and winning again in 1984–85. Beadman piloted Inspired to the winning post in 1984 in taking Australia's premier two-year-old event, the Golden Slipper Stakes, for his first Group 1 win. He repeated that feat on Guineas in 1997. While still a teenager he rode in France for John Fellows winning the 1985 Prix Morny on Regal State.

== Australia ==
Beadman is a seven-time Sydney jockey premiership winner and has won most of Australia's biggest races. He holds the record for the highest number of wins in the metropolitan area with 162. He recorded that feat in the 2006/2007 season. Such wins include Melbourne Cup wins for trainer Bart Cummings on Kingston Rule (1990) and Saintly (1996) and Golden Slipper victories aboard Inspired (1984) and Guineas in 1997. He also won the Cox Plate on Saintly in 1996. Furthermore, he rode Super Impose to the Doncaster Handicap/Epsom Handicap double in 1991. He also rode Octagonal and Lonhro to a number of Group 1 wins including the Australian Cup and the AJC Derby on Octagonal.

In 2007, Beadman was inducted into the Australian Racing Hall of Fame, the first Jockey to be inducted whilst still competing.

He won the triple crown on Octagonal in Sydney's three-year-old autumn triple crown – the Canterbury and Rosehill Guineas and the Australian Derby

== Hong Kong ==
Beadman moved to Hong Kong in 2007 to become the stable jockey for John Moore in Hong Kong and helped the trainer to his first premiership in almost 20 years. Beadman has ridden more than 250 winners in Hong Kong including Hong Kong International Bowl twice, the CXHK Sprint, and the MBHK Derby. In February 2012 Beadman suffered a serious head injury at Sha Tin Racecourse. Beadman fell when a horse broke both of its legs underneath him in a barrier trial. Beadman suffered a diffuse axonal brain injury and a broken cheekbone from the fall. He underwent rehabilitation for his injury in both Hong Kong and Sydney.

== Second retirement ==
As a result of the injuries sustained in the barrier trial fall in Hong Kong, Beadman announced his retirement from race riding in October 2012.

== Training ==
In 2014 it was announced that Beadman had taken up a position as an assistant trainer with the Darley Racing organisation under head trainer John O'Shea.

In May 2017, Beadman became the interim head trainer for the Australian Godolphin stable after the resignation of John O'Shea.

During his time as head trainer for the Australian Godolphin stable, Beadman had 233 runners, for 36 winners, including the 2017 Group 1 Stradbroke Handicap with 3-year-old colt Impending.

Beadman held this position for two months until James Cummings was appointed head trainer. Beadman remains as an assistant trainer to Cummings in the Godolphin stable.

== Group 1 winners (As Jockey) ==
=== International Group 1 winners (85) ===
- AJC Derby – Octagonal (1996); Headturner (2006); Fiumicino (2007)
- All Aged Stakes – Card Shark (1989); Shamekha (2005); Paratroopers (2006)
- ATC Sires' Produce Stakes – Camarilla (2007)
- Australian Cup – Let's Elope (1992); Saintly (1996); Lonhro (2004)
- Canterbury Guineas – Octagonal (1996); Niello (2004); Mentality (2007)
- Caulfield Guineas – Procul Harum (1989);
- Caulfield Stakes – Lonhro (2002); Lonhro (2003)
- C F Orr Stakes – Saintly (1997); Redoute's Choice (2000); Lonhro (2004)
- Champagne Stakes – Mentality (2006)
- Champions Mile – Able One (2010); Xtension (2011)
- Chipping Norton Stakes – Heat of the Moment (1986); Super Impose (1991); Super Impose (1992); Lonhro (2003)
- Coolmore Classic – Quicksilver Cindy (1991); Danni Martine (2005); Tuesday Joy (2007)
- Cox Plate – Saintly (1996)
- Doncaster Handicap – Super Impose (1991)
- Doomben Cup – Juggler (1996)
- Epsom Handicap – Regal Native (1988); Super Impose (1991); Navy Seal (1994)
- Emirates Stakes – Catalan Opening (1997)
- Flight Stakes – Electrique (1991); Dashing Eagle (1996)
- Futurity Stakes – Star Dancer (1996)
- George Main Stakes – Lonhro (2003)
- George Ryder Stakes – March Hare (1995); Lonhro (2003); Lonhro (2004)
- Golden Slipper Stakes – Inspired (1984); Guineas (1997)
- Hong Kong Sprint – Inspiration (2008)
- Mackinnon Stakes – Lonhro (2002)
- Manikato Stakes – Spartacus (1997)
- Melbourne Cup – Kingston Rule (1990); Saintly (1996)
- New Zealand Derby – Great Command (1996)
- Oakleigh Plate – Spartacus (1997)
- Prix Morny – Regal State (1985)
- QTC Sires' Produce Stakes – Anthems (1996)
- Spring Champion Stakes – Tie the Knot (1997)
- Sydney Cup – Mahtoum (2005)
- Queen Elizabeth Stakes – Authaal (1988); Lonhro (2003)
- Queen of the Turf Stakes – Ike's Dream (2005); Mnemosyne (2006); Neroli (2009)
- Ranvet Stakes – Super Impose (1991); Tuesday Joy (2008)
- Rosehill Guineas – Octagonal (1996); Tarnpir Lane (1997); Niello (2004)
- The BMW – Octagonal (1996); Freemason (2003); Tuesday Joy (2008); Fiumicino (2009)
- The Galaxy – Padstow (2001); Charge Forward (2005)
- The J. J. Atkins – Anthems (1996); Apercu (2007)
- The Metropolitan – Railings (2005)
- The Thousand Guineas – Dashing Eagle (1996); Lady of the Pines (1997); Mnemosyne (2005)
- TJ Smith Stakes – Shamekha (2005)
- Underwood Stakes – Octagonal (1996)
- Vinery Stud Stakes – Saleous (1996); Danendri (1997)
- VRC Oaks – Saleous (1995)
- VRC Sires' Produce Stakes – Millward (1997)
- Zabeel Classic – Captain Moonlight (1997)

=== Hong Kong Group 1 winners (6) ===
- Hong Kong Champions & Chater Cup – Mighty High (2011)
- Hong Kong Derby – Collection (2009)
- Hong Kong Gold Cup – Viva Pataca (2008); Viva Pataca (2009); Collection (2010)
- Queen's Silver Jubilee Cup – Happy Zero (2010)

== Group 1 winners (As Trainer) ==
=== International Group 1 winners (1) ===
- Stradbroke Handicap – Impending (2017)

== Performance ==
Seasons	Total Rides	No. of Wins	No. of 2nds	No. of 3rds	No. of 4ths	Stakes won
2010/2011	370	57	37	43	40	HK$62,425,800
