= Australian Cup =

Australian group 1 thoroughbred horse race

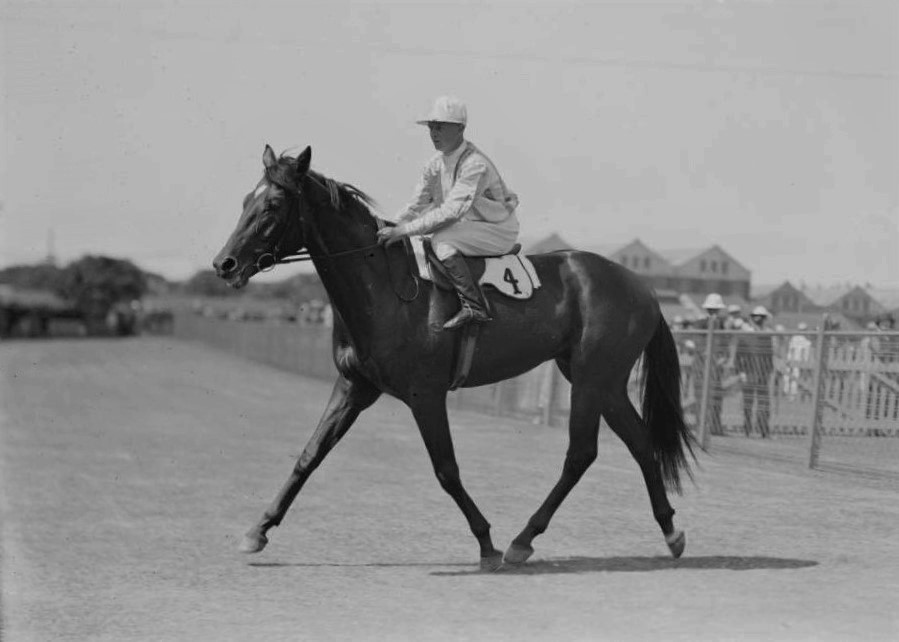
- Sylvandale, 1935 winner
- Class: Group I
- Location: Flemington Racecourse; Melbourne, Australia
- Inaugurated: 1863
- Race type: Thoroughbred – Flat racing
- Sponsor: TAB (2017-26)

Race information
- Distance: 2,000 metres
- Surface: Turf
- Track: Left-handed
- Qualification: Horses three years old and older Maidens ineligible
- Weight: Weight for Age
- Purse: A$2,000,000 (2026)

The Australian Cup is a Victoria Racing Club Group 1 Thoroughbred horse race for horses three years old and older, held under Weight for Age conditions, over a distance of 2000 metres, at Flemington Racecourse, Melbourne, Australia in March during the VRC Autumn Racing Carnival.

== History ==
The race was once Australia's premier long distance race, raced at a distance of 18 furlongs (3621m) - thus, longer than the Melbourne Cup. In 1943 the race was shortened to 17 furlongs 110 yards to allow the race to be started from the top of Flemington's famous Straight Six, to have bigger fields.

The VRC in the early 1960s shortened the distance to 1 1/4 miles to attract classier middle distance gallopers.

Stakes were increased from $1 million to $1.5 million in 2016.

=== Distance ===
- 1863–1942 - 2 1/4 miles (~3627m)
- 1943–1962 – 2 miles 1 1/2 furlongs (~3528m)
- 1963 - 1 3/4 miles (~2821m)
- 1964–1972 - 1 1/4 miles (~2015m)
- 1973 onwards - 2000 metres

=== Conditions ===
- 1863–1978 - Handicap
- 1979–1982 - Weight for Age
- 1983–1986 - Handicap
- 1987 onwards - Weight for Age

=== Grade ===
- 1863–1979 - Principal Race
- 1979 onwards - Group 1

=== Venue ===
In 2007 the race was run at Caulfield Racecourse due to refurbishment work at Flemington Racecourse.

=== Records ===
Makybe Diva won this race in 2005 in the Australian record time of 1:58:73, which beat Northerly's previous record. The most successful trainer has been Bart Cummings with thirteen wins – 1968, 1973, 1975, 1976, 1977, 1978, 1980, 1981, 1985, 1992, 1996, 1998, 2008.

The most successful jockey is Tom Hales who won the Australian Cup eight times – Lurline (1875), Richmond (1876), Savanaka (1879), Navigator (1883), Morpeth (1884), Trident (1887), Carlyon (1888), Dreadnought (1890).

=== 1954 racebook ===
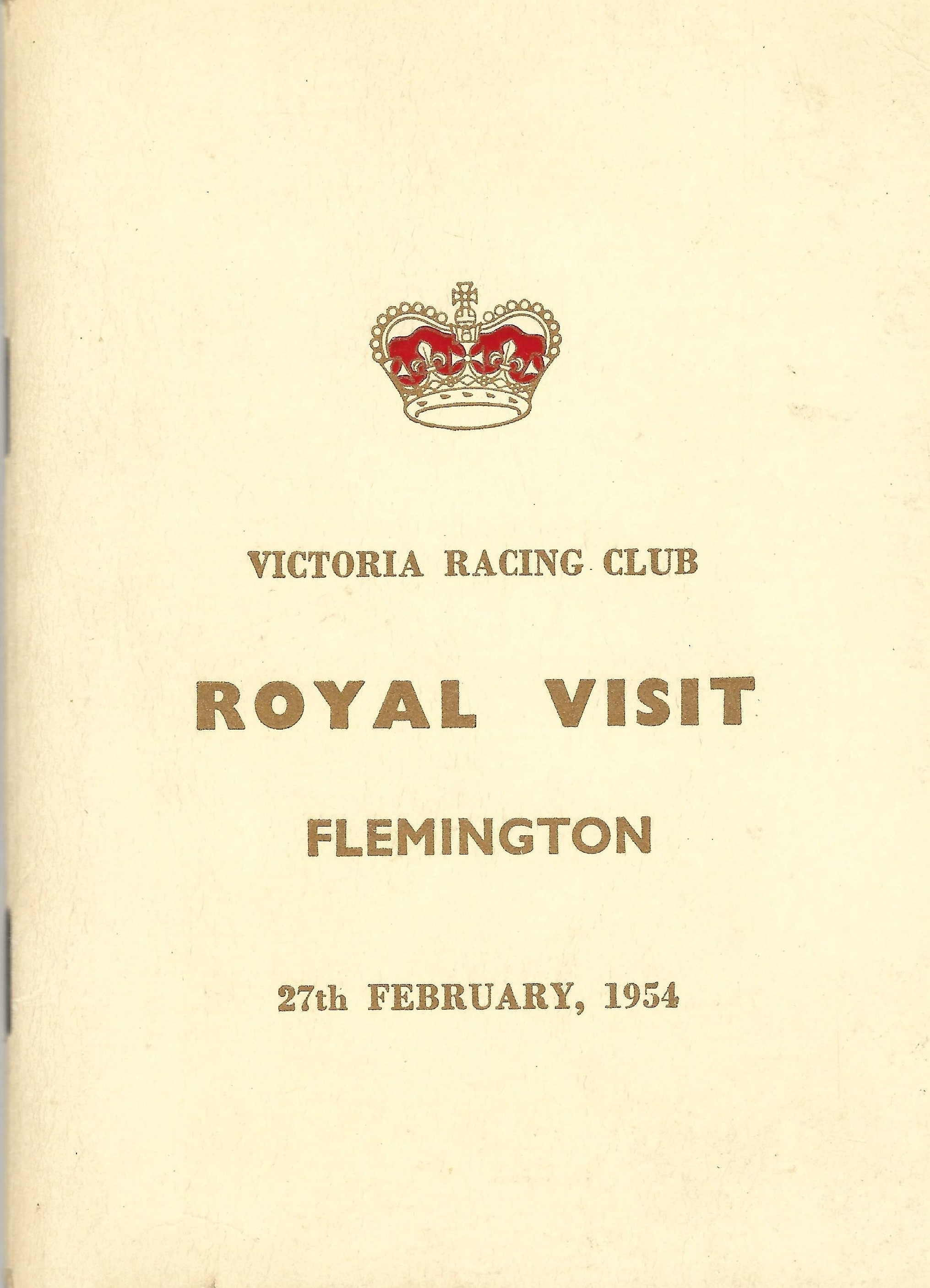
1954 VRC Australian Cup racebook front cover

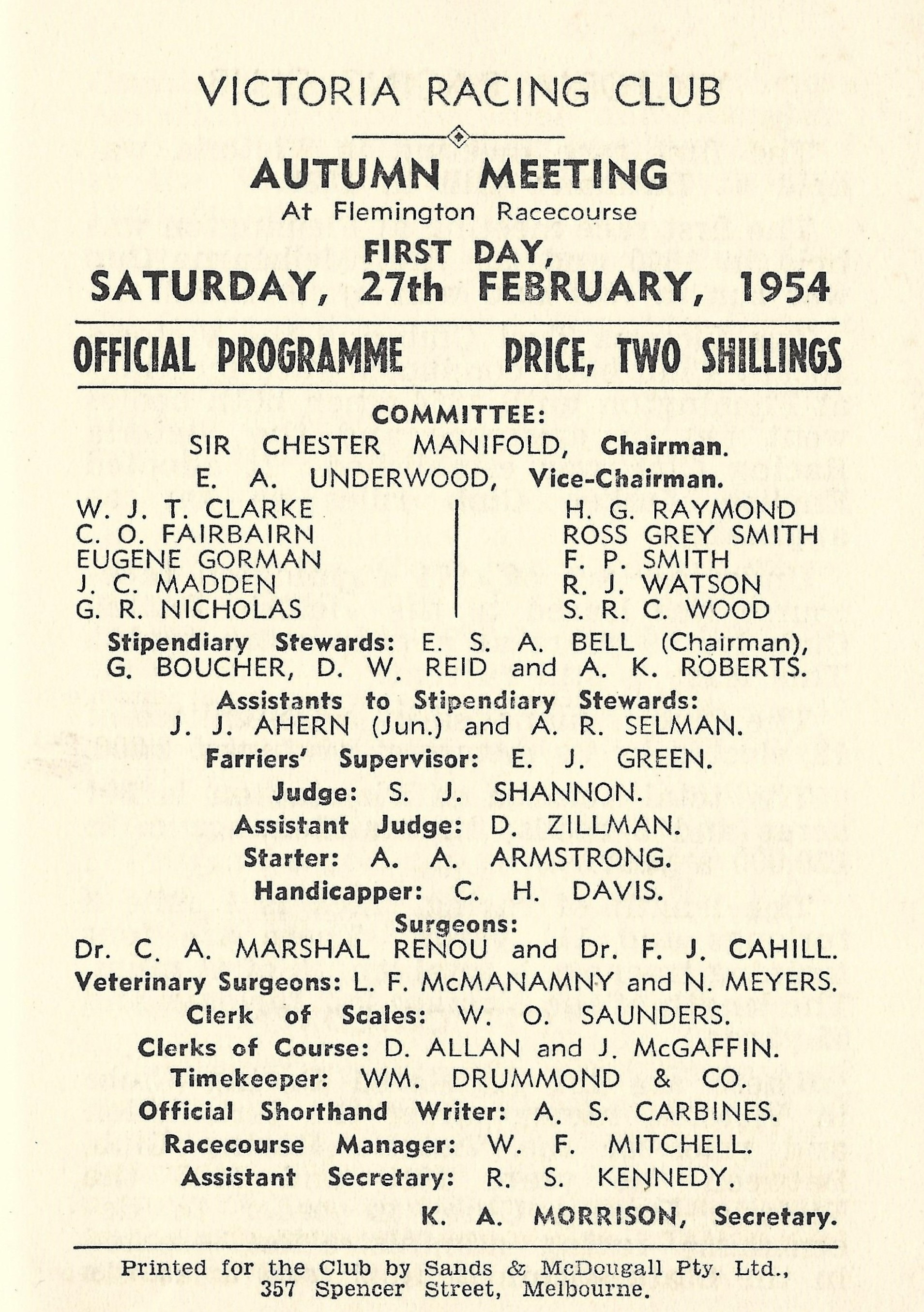
1954 VRC Australian Cup raceday officials

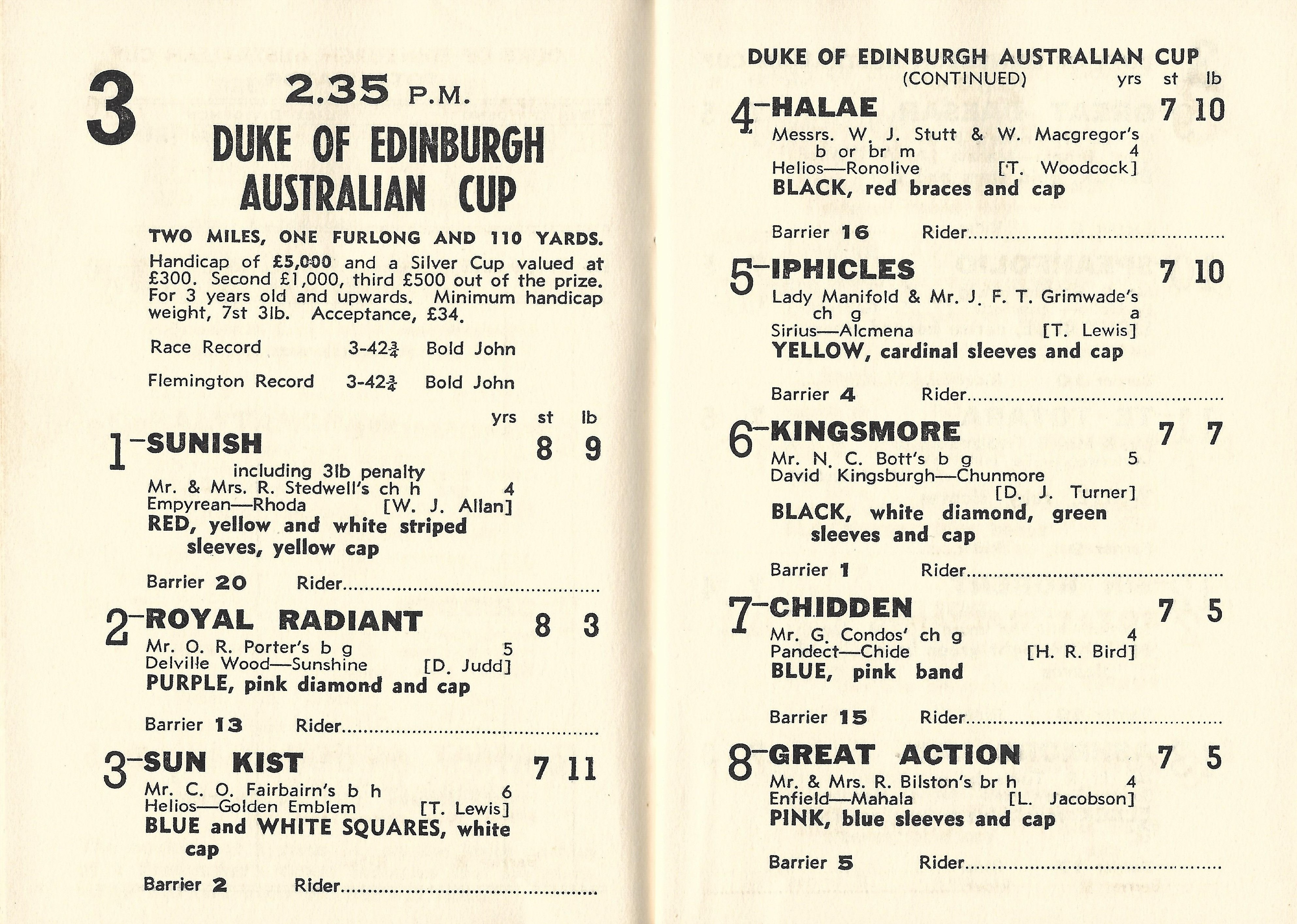
1954 VRC Australian Cup showing the winner, Sunish

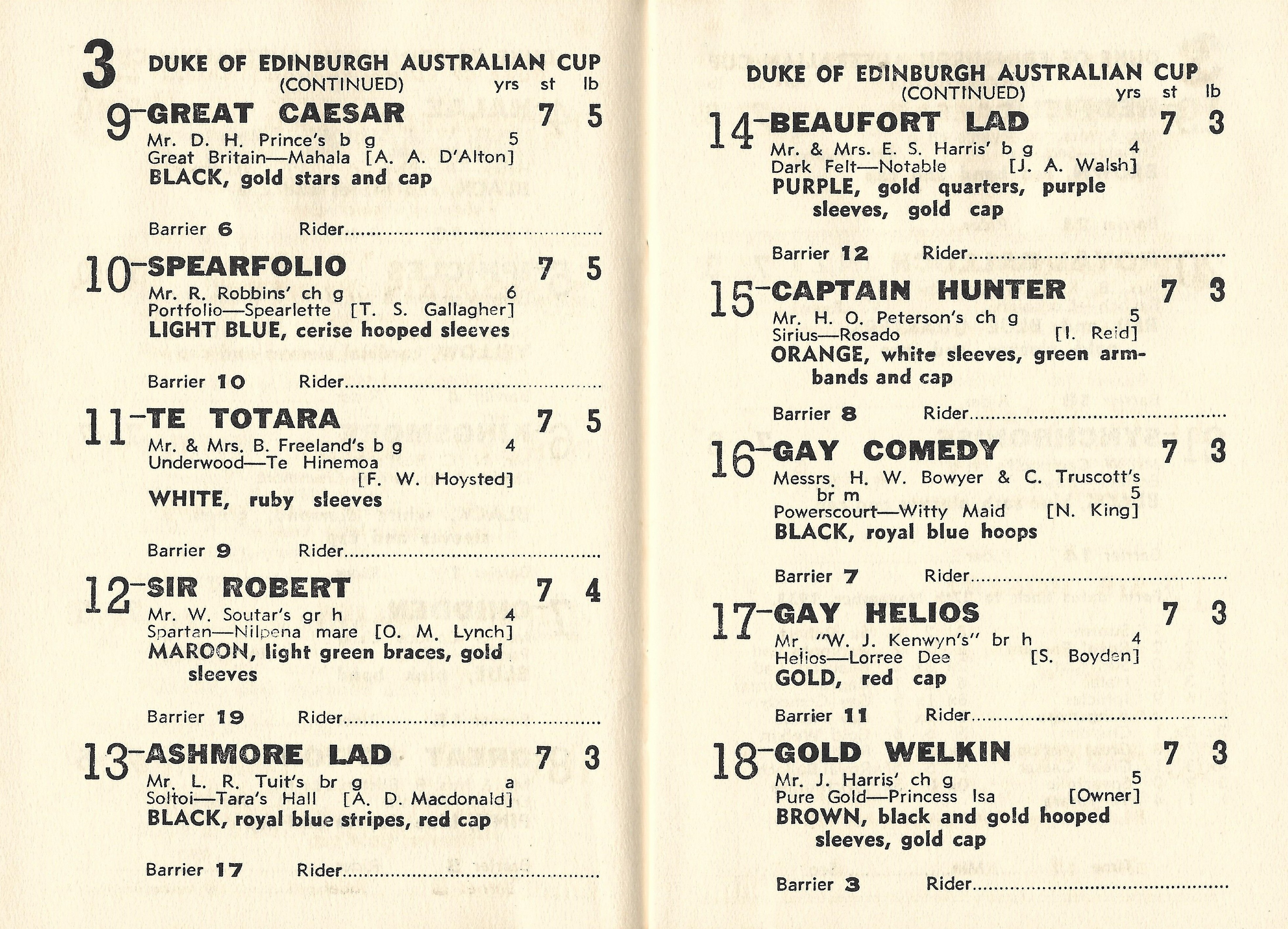
1954 VRC Australian Cup starters and results

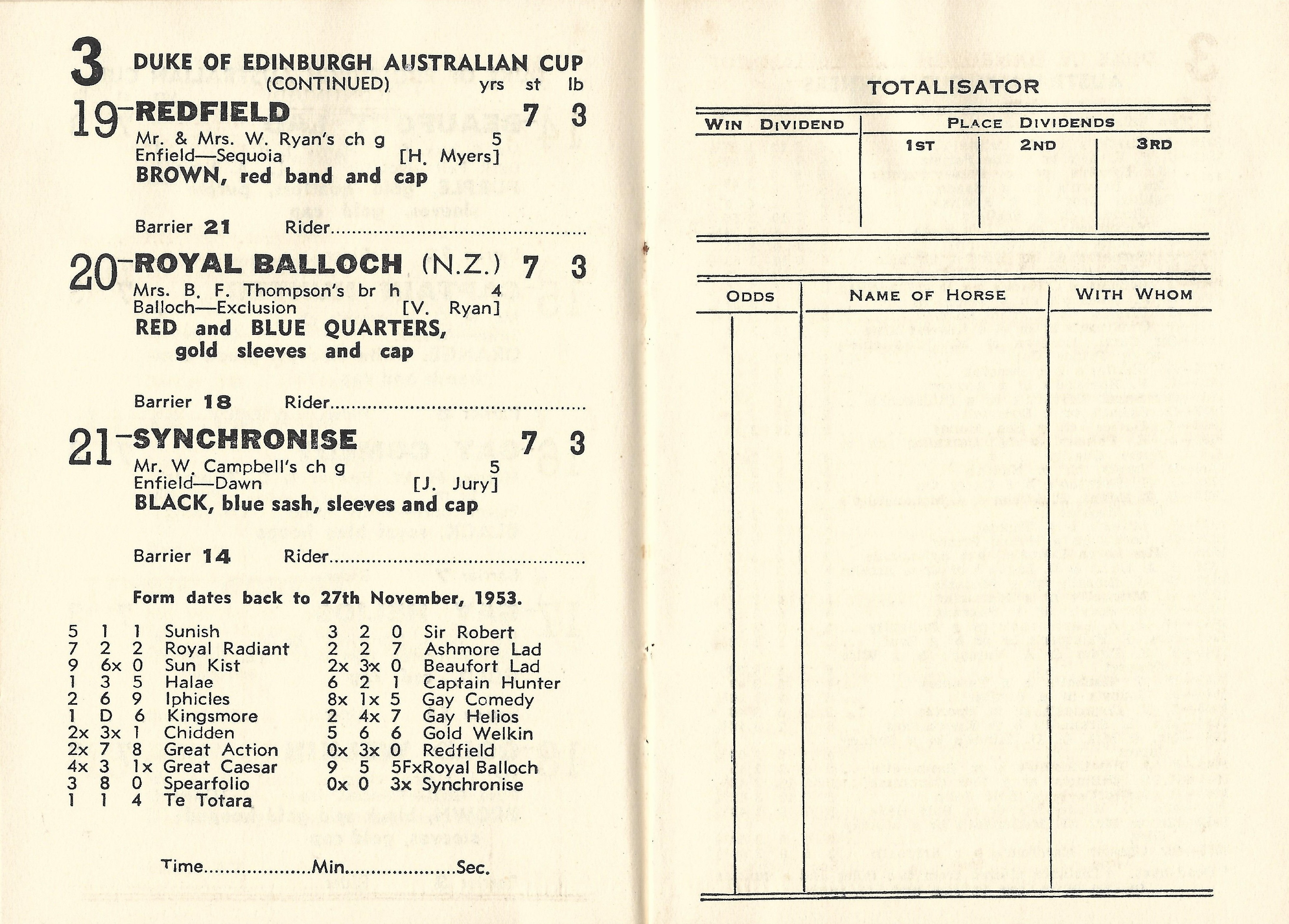
1954 VRC Australian Cup starters and results

== Winners ==
The following are winners of the race.

- 2026 - Light Infantry Man
- 2025 - Light Infantry Man
- 2024 - Cascadian
- 2023 - Cascadian
- 2022 - Duais
- 2021 - Homesman
- 2020 - Fifty Stars
- 2019 - Harlem
- 2018 - Harlem
- 2017 - Humidor
- 2016 - Preferment (Note: In 2016 Awesome Rock crossed the finish line first, but was relegated to second place due to interference.)
- 2015 - Spillway
- 2014 - Fiorente
- 2013 - Super Cool
- 2012 - Manighar
- 2011 - Shocking
- 2010 - Zipping
- 2009 - Niconero
- 2008 - Sirmione
- 2007 - Pompeii Ruler
- 2006 - Roman Arch
- 2005 - Makybe Diva
- 2004 - Lonhro
- 2003 - Northerly
- 2002 - Old Comrade
- 2001 - Northerly
- 2000 - Intergaze
- 1999 - Istidaad
- 1998 - Dane Ripper
- 1997 - Octagonal
- 1996 - Saintly
- 1995 - Starstruck
- 1994 - Durbridge
- 1993 - Veandercross
- 1992 - Let's Elope
- 1991 - Better Loosen Up
- 1990 - Vo Rogue
- 1989 - Vo Rogue
- 1988 - Dandy Andy
- 1987 - Bonecrusher
- 1986 - Playful Princess
- 1985 - Noble Peer
- 1984 - Admiral Lincoln
- 1983 - Spectrum
- 1982 - Kip
- 1981 - Hyperno
- 1980 - Ming Dynasty
- 1979 - Dulcify
- 1978 - Ming Dynasty
- 1977 - Ngawyni
- 1976 - Lord Dudley
- 1975 - Leilani
- 1974 - Bush Win
- 1973 - Gladman
- 1972 - Jan's Beau
- 1971 - Gay Icarus
- 1970 - Crewman
- 1969 - †Yootha / Cyron
- 1968 - Arctic Coast
- 1967 - Bore Head
- 1966 - Craftsman
- 1965 - Craftsman
- 1964 - Grand Print
- 1963 - Welkin Prince
- 1962 - Welkin Prince
- 1961 - Dream King
- 1960 - Illoura
- 1959 - Gaybao
- 1958 - Dream Son
- 1957 - Miss High Caste
- 1956 - Pushover
- 1955 - Hellion
- 1954 - Sunish
- 1953 - Arbroath
- 1952 - Murray Glen
- 1951 - Bold Belle
- 1950 - Bold John
- 1949 - New Cashmere
- 1948 - Bannerette
- 1947 - Sydney James
- 1946 - Knockarlow
- 1945 - Spectre
- 1944 - Similar
- 1943 - Taramoa
- 1942 - Wise Counsel
- 1941 - Saul
- 1940 - Indignity
- 1939 - Pageant
- 1938 - Marauder
- 1937 - Mutable
- 1936 - Amalia
- 1935 - Sylvandale
- 1934 - Heroic Prince
- 1933 - Topical
- 1932 - Madstar
- 1931 - Carry On
- 1930 - Nadean
- 1929 - Some Quality
- 1928 - Sea Money
- 1927 - Spearfelt
- 1926 - Pilliewinkie
- 1925 - Answer
- 1924 - Accarak
- 1923 - Prince Cox
- 1922 - Harvest King
- 1921 - The Rover
- 1920 - Macadam
- 1919 - New Tipperary
- 1918 - Defence
- 1917 - Harriet Graham
- 1916 - Cherubini
- 1915 - Lempriere
- 1914 - Wallalo
- 1913 - Almissa
- 1912 - †Saxonite / Prizefighter
- 1911 - The Parisian
- 1910 - Orline
- 1909 - Pendil
- 1908 - Peru
- 1907 - Realm
- 1906 - Tartan
- 1905 - Lord Ullin's Daughter
- 1904 - Marmont
- 1903 - Great Scot
- 1902 - Blue Metal
- 1901 - Dreamland
- 1900 - La Carabine
- 1899 - Bobadil
- 1898 - Ayrshire
- 1897 - Coil
- 1896 - Idolator
- 1895 - Havoc
- 1894 - Broken Hill
- 1893 - Portsea
- 1892 - Highborn
- 1891 - Vengeance
- 1890 - Dreadnought
- 1889 - Lochiel
- 1888 - Carlyon
- 1887 - Trident
- 1886 - Malua
- 1885 - Ringwood
- 1884 - Morpeth
- 1883 - Navigator
- 1882 - Pollio
- 1881 - Firstwater
- 1880 - Columbus
- 1879 - Savanaka
- 1878 - First King
- 1877 - Sybil
- 1876 - Richmond
- 1875 - Lurline
- 1874 - Protos
- 1873 - Warrior
- 1872 - ‡Saladin
- 1871 - Nimblefoot
- 1870 - Norma
- 1869 - Gasworks
- 1868 - Shenandoah
- 1867 - Tim Whiffler
- 1866 - Woodman
- 1865 - Woodman
- 1864 - Nathalie
- 1863 - Barwon

† Dead heat
‡ Saladin and Flying Dutchman dead heated. After a re-run they dead heated again. On a second re-run Saladin was victorious.

== See also ==
- Thoroughbred Breeders Stakes
- List of Australian Group races
- Group races
