= Shane Dye =

New Zealand jockey

Personal information
- Born: 26 September 1966 (age 59) Matamata, New Zealand
- Occupation: Jockey

Horse racing career
- Sport: Horse racing

Honours
- Australian Racing Hall of Fame; New Zealand Racing Hall of Fame

Raymond Shane Dye (born 26 September 1966, in the township of Matamata New Zealand), is a former jockey. He was an apprentice jockey to Dave O’Sullivan at Matamata, before moving to Sydney, Australia where he was initially working with Vic Thompson at Warwick Farm in the late-1980s. In a distinguished riding career, Dye won the Melbourne Cup on Tawriffic in 1989 in then-record time, and won four consecutive Golden Slippers from 1989 to 1992. He also won the Cox Plate on Octagonal in 1995.

Dye won two Sydney Jockeys Premierships in the 1990–91 and 1996–97 seasons and rode over 2,000 career winners.

Dye rode in Mauritius after eight years in Hong Kong.

Shane Dye has ridden 93 career Group 1 winners. He has not ridden in competitive racing since 2013 and has said he will not return to racing. On 9 March 2014 he was inducted into the Australian Racing Hall of Fame.

== Notable wins ==
The following are some of the races Shane has won in his career.

Year	Race	Horse	Trainer(s)
1984	Avondale Cup (G1)	Cariere	J W Morris
1989	Golden Slipper Stakes	Courtza	R S McDonald
1989	Blue Diamond Stakes	Courtza	R S McDonald
1989	Melbourne Cup	Tawriffic	Lee Freedman
1990	Brisbane Cup	Shuzohra	E Skelton
1990	Golden Slipper Stakes	Canny Lad	R G Hore-Lacy
1991	Golden Slipper Stakes	Tierce	Clarry Conners
1991	H E Tancred Stakes	Dr Grace	G Chapman
1992	AJC Sires Produce Stakes	Burst	Clarry Connors
1992	Golden Slipper Stakes	Burst	Clarry Conners
1995	Cox Plate	Octagonal	John Hawkes
1995	Victoria Derby	Nothin' Leica Dane	Gai Waterhouse
1996	AJC Sires Produce Stakes	Merlene	D L Freedman
1997	Adelaide Cup	Cronus	Roger James
1997	Australian Cup	Octagonal	John Hawkes
1997	Australian Derby	Ebony Grove	Graeme Rogerson
1997	Doomben 10,000	Accomplice	John Hawkes
1997	Newmarket Handicap	Ruffles	M Lees
1997	AJC Sires Produce Stakes	Encounter	C Connors
1997	Tancred Stakes	Octagonal	John Hawkes
1998	Sydney Cup	Tie The Knot	G Walter
1998	Brisbane Cup	Praise Indeed	N McBurney
1998	Adelaide Cup	The Hind	P C Hayes
1999	Australian Oaks	Grand Archway	
2000	Australian Oaks	Coco Cobanna	Gai Waterhouse
2004	Hong Kong Champions & Chater Cup	Super Kid	John Size

== See also ==
- Thoroughbred racing in Australia
- Thoroughbred racing in New Zealand
