= Bart Cummings =

Australian horse trainer (1927–2015)

Bart Cummings AM
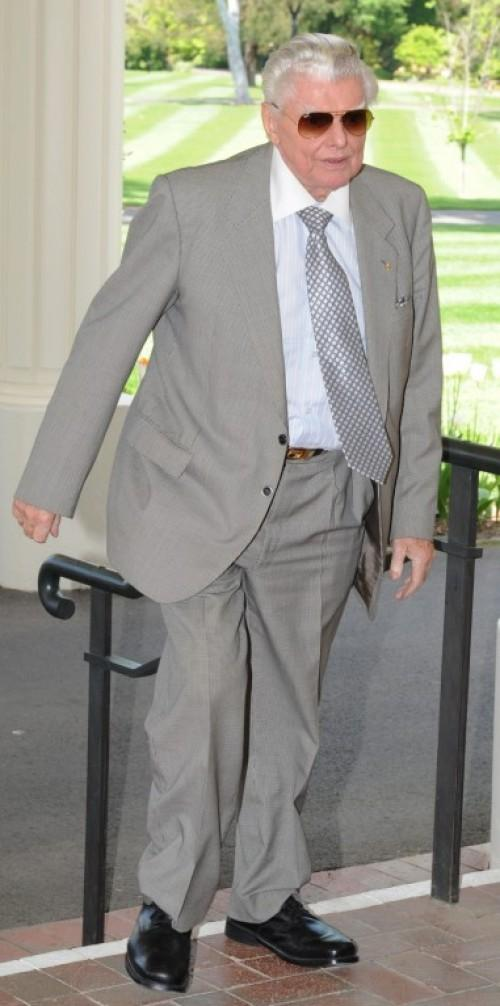
- Cummings at Government House, Canberra, in 2011

Personal information
- Born: 14 November 1927 Adelaide, South Australia, Australia
- Died: 30 August 2015 (aged 87) Sydney, New South Wales, Australia
- Occupations: Thoroughbred race horse trainer Thoroughbred horse owner and breeder

Horse racing career
- Sport: Horse racing
- Career wins: 12x Melbourne Cup; 7x Caulfield Cup; 4x Golden Slipper; 13x Australian Cup; 5x Cox Plate; 9x VRC Oaks; 8x Newmarket Handicap

Racing awards
- 12x Melbourne Cup

Honours
- Order of Australia; Sport Australia Hall of Fame; Australian Racing Hall of Fame; Image on Australia Post Postage stamp Former Australian National Treasure; The Bart Cummings

Significant horses
- Light Fingers; Galilee; Red Handed; Think Big; Gold and Black; Hyperno; Ming Dynasty; Beau Zam; Kingston Rule; Let's Elope; Saintly; Rogan Josh; Viewed; So You Think

James Bartholomew Cummings AM (14 November 1927 – 30 August 2015), also known by his initials J. B. Cummings, was one of the most successful Australian racehorse trainers. He was known as the Cups King, referring to the Melbourne Cup, as he won 'the race that stops a nation' a record twelve times. During his lifetime, Cummings was considered an Australian cultural icon and an Australian National Living Treasure. His status as a racing icon in the 20th century was generally considered equivalent to that of Etienne L. de Mestre in the 19th century.

== Early life ==
Cummings was born in 1927, in Adelaide, South Australia, the son of the accomplished trainer Jim Cummings, who trained the great stayer Comic Court to a win in the 1950 Melbourne Cup. Bart started his career working for his father as a strapper—despite being allergic to horses and hay. Cummings had an older brother, Pat, and said of his father: "I had the best of teachers. My dad had a lot of experience behind him and I picked up from him by watching, listening, and keeping my mouth shut".

== Training career ==
Cummings received his trainer licence in 1953, and set up stables at Glenelg in South Australia. His first significant win came in 1958, when he won the South Australian Derby, his first Group 1 win.

Cummings had a record total of 89 runners in the Melbourne Cup starting in 1958 with Asian Court who finished twelfth. His next entrant was Trellios who fronted up in 1959 and finished fifth. In 1960, Sometime finished in sixth place. It wasn't until 1965 that, with three runners in the Melbourne Cup, Cummings finished first with Light Fingers and second with Ziema, with his other runner, The Dip, finished eighteenth.

Cummings won his first Trainer's Premiership in the 1965–1966 season. Not only did he achieve his first Melbourne Cup victory that year, but he also won the Adelaide, Caulfield, Sandown, Sydney, Brisbane and Queen's cups.

In 1968, Cummings opened stables, now called Saintly Lodge, at Flemington in Melbourne, home of the Flemington Racecourse. Later that year, he won the Trainer's Premiership the first of five.

In 1969, the favourite for the Melbourne Cup was Cummings' horse Big Philou, which had already won the Caulfield Cup. However, the horse was drugged illicitly with a large dose of laxative the morning of the race and was unable to compete.

In 1974, he became the first trainer in the British Commonwealth to train horses who won $1 million in prize money.

In 1975, Cummings moved his operations to a new facility near Randwick Racecourse in Sydney, called 'Leilani Lodge'.

Cummings trained and co-owned Ming Dynasty with his wife Valmae, horse breeder Lloyd Foyster and his wife Jacqueline, and Ron and Hildegard Websdale.

As well as his 1977 and 1980 Caulfield Cup wins, he won two VRC Australian Cups (1978 and 1980), the 1978 AJC Queen Elizabeth Stakes and the Metropolitan Handicap in the same year.

In the late 1980s, Cummings spent millions of dollars purchasing racehorses, much of the money spent on behalf of a tax minimisation syndicate. Unfortunately, like many other trainers Cummings was hit hard by the recession of the early 1990s. With help from Reg Inglis' organisation, however, he avoided bankruptcy and continued training.

Cummings had training facilities at Randwick (NSW) and Flemington(Vic) but in 2014 the Flemington stables closed and all horses and training moved to Randwick. Cummings had gone into virtual retirement at Princes his property at the foot of the Blue Mountains. Bart's grandson and partner, James made the decision for financial reasons.

Cummings' final Melbourne Cup winner was Viewed in the 2008 race, when the horse beat Bauer in a photo finish. This was his 12th Melbourne Cup victory, on the 50th anniversary of the day when he entered his first Cup runner.

Cummings achieved 246 Group 1 victories and more than 776 stakes victories. In addition to his 12 Melbourne Cups, he won the Caulfield Cup seven times, the Golden Slipper Stakes four times, the Cox Plate five times, the VRC Oaks nine times and the Newmarket Handicap eight times. He also won the Australian Cup thirteen times.

=== Honours ===
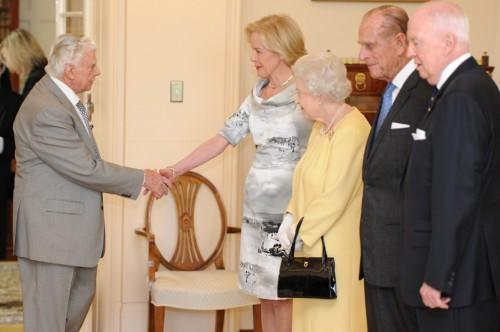
Cummings meets Governor-General Quentin Bryce, The Queen, Prince Philip and Michael Bryce at Government House, Canberra, in 2011

- 1974 ABC Sportsman of the Year
- 1982 Made a Member of the Order of Australia for his services to the racing industry.
- 1991 11 December 1991, Cummings was inducted into the Sport Australia Hall of Fame.
- 1997 Named in National Trusts 100 Australian Living Legends (chosen by a national vote)
- 2000 Awarded a Centennial Medal and carried the Olympic Torch
- 2001 An inaugural inductee into the Australian Racing Hall of Fame .
- 2004 First licensed person to be made Lifetime member of Victoria Racing Club
- 2007 Australia Post placed his image on a postage stamp as part of its Australian Legends series.
- 2008 Racing NSW announced a new horse racing award to be known as The Bart Cummings Medal which will be awarded for 'consistent, outstanding performances amongst jockeys and trainers at New South Wales metropolitan race meetings through the racing season.

=== Melbourne Cup winners ===
In 1965, 1966, 1974, 1975, and 1991, Cummings trained both the first- and second-placed horses in the Melbourne Cup. In all, Cummings won twelve Melbourne Cups with eleven horses:

- Light Fingers (1965)
- Galilee (1966)
- Red Handed (1967)
- Think Big (1974 & 1975)
- Gold and Black (1977)
- Hyperno (1979)
- Kingston Rule (1990)
- Let's Elope (1991)
- Saintly (1996)
- Rogan Josh (1999)
- Viewed (2008)

In February 2016, the Victoria Racing Club unveiled a precinct in honour of Cummings at Flemington Racecourse to be named Saintly Place. The chairman said,

We’re extremely pleased that Bart endorsed this initiative, which importantly is in general admission and accessible to all,...Bart has generously bequeathed a collection of his trophies for public display at Flemington, and in time Saintly Place will become a permanent trackside museum dedicated to the Cups King. The large collection includes Saintly’s Melbourne Cup and Bart’s 12 Melbourne Cup trainer’s trophies, as well as Caulfield Cups and Cox Plates.

== Personal life and death ==
Born in the Adelaide suburb of Glenelg, he attended the Marist Brothers' Sacred Heart College in Adelaide in the beachside suburb of Somerton Park. He left school at 14. Cummings met Valmae "Val" (died 12 January 2017) at a church social in Adelaide, and they married in 1954. Like his parents, Cummings was a practising Catholic, and their faith played an important role in their lives. He had five children: daughters Sharon (now Robinson), Anne-Marie (now Casey), and Margaret and sons John (deceased 2011) and Anthony. His son Anthony and grandson James (who Bart made a partner in 2011) are also trainers, while second grandson Edward was a stable foreman with Anthony but has now been approved to train in partnership with Anthony.

Cummings authored a book, Bart: My Life, which was published in 2009.

Cummings died on 30 August 2015 in Prince's Farm in Castlereagh, NSW, two days after he and wife Valmae celebrated their 61st wedding anniversary. He was 87. His family accepted an offer by the premier of New South Wales, Mike Baird, of a state funeral, which took place on 7 September at St Mary's Cathedral, Sydney, on College Street, and was televised on Sky Thoroughbred Central, 7Two, ABC and Nine Network Australia from 10AM AEST.

== Will dispute ==
On 28 October 2016, a dispute over Cummings' will was heard in the New South Wales Supreme Court. The dispute was between Anthony and his sister Margaret, who wanted the $30 million estate to be settled as per Cummings' will. They also took the executor of the estate, accountant Aaron Ross Randell, to court, contesting their father's final will. In a separate action, sisters Sharon and Anne-Marie were contesting the division of the estate. Supreme Court Justice Francois Kunc ordered that the parties find someone who could act as an intermediary in mediation between the parties. He expected mediation to occur in December/January, and the matter was to return to court in February 2017.

Mediation was under the control of eminent former appeal court judge Keith Mason, QC, with the first meeting was scheduled for 30 November. The mediation over two days failed to resolve the dispute, and Judge Philip Hallen ordered that the parties submit any further evidence by 30 January. A hearing was scheduled for 24 February when a date for a hearing was to be set. With the death of Bart's wife in early January 2017, the family "...will put aside all ill-will as the mourn the loss of their mother". No further stories regarding the estate have appeared in the media, and the matter may have been settled privately.

== Secret family controversy ==
In November 2016, two sisters in Adelaide, Kimberley and Julia Mander, went public with a claim that Cummings was the father of their father, Peter Mander, from a relationship with their grandmother, Patricia Kilmartin. They allege that the couple were in a relationship for over a year and Patricia fell pregnant in mid-1951. The relationship ended, and Lloyd Mander married Patricia and raised Peter as his son. They have engaged a lawyer and have asked for DNA tests for to confirm their story. They have stated that they are not interested in a financial claim on Cummings' estate.

Cummings' daughter Sharon Robinson has said that she is happy to give a DNA sample and to meet the girls who would be her nieces if Bart Cummings is proved to be their grandfather.
