= Steven King (jockey) =

Australian jockey

Steven R. King (born 1968 in Victoria) is a former Australian jockey who is best known for riding Let's Elope to victory in the 1991 Melbourne Cup.

He was awarded the Scobie Breasley Medal for 1997.

King retired in 2016 having ridden 54 Group 1 winners.

== Notable wins ==
- Blue Diamond Stakes: Hurricane Sky (1994)
- Caulfield Cup: Let's Elope (1991)
- Cox Plate: Fields of Omagh (2003)
- Hong Kong Sprint: Fairy King Prawn (1999)
- Melbourne Cup: Let's Elope (1991)
- Sydney Cup: Count Chivas (1996)
- VRC Derby: Star Of The Realm (1991)
