= William Pike (jockey) =

Australian jockey

Personal information
- Nicknames: The Wizard, Willie
- Nationality: Australian
- Born: 20 March 1986 (age 40)
- Occupation: Jockey
- Height: 148 cm (4 ft 10 in)
- Weight: 51 kg (112 lb)

Horse racing career
- Sport: Horse racing
- Career wins: 3,730

Major racing wins
- All-Star Mile; Caulfield Guineas; Caulfield Stakes; Railway Stakes; Winterbottom Stakes; Kingston Town Classic; W. S. Cox Plate

Significant horses
- Cosmic Crusader

William Pike is an Australian Thoroughbred racing jockey. Having spent most of his career racing in his home state of Western Australia, Pike is widely considered to be the state's leading jockey. He is nicknamed "The Wizard" due to his ability to produce winning rides. Pike's great-great-grandfather, Jim Pike, was also a jockey, best known for riding the legendary Phar Lap to victory in the 1930 Melbourne Cup.

== Early life ==
Pike was born in Kalgoorlie-Boulder, Western Australia, and grew up in the small country town of Coolgardie. His first race was at Esperance racecourse on 3 March 2002, and his first win was in Norseman the following week.

== Racing career ==
Pike has won more than 3,000 horse races across his career, with over 100 of those wins being in Group races. His first Group 1 win was the WATC Derby in 2006, aboard Cats Fun. He has won virtually every major race in Perth, including seven Railway Stakes, five Perth Cups, three Winterbottom Stakes, and the Kingston Town Classic twice, although he is yet to win the Northerly Stakes, previously known as the Kingston Town Classic. In August 2026, Pike was inducted into the WA Racing Hall of Fame.

In Melbourne, he has previously won the Caulfield Guineas (aboard Ole Kirk), the Caulfield Stakes, the All-Star Mile, the William Reid Stakes, the Oakleigh Plate, the Turnbull Stakes, and the Cox Plate.

== Notable wins ==
Some of his most notable Group wins include:

Australia

Perth

- WATC Derby - (12) (Note: Pike has won the WATC Derby 12 times, but only three of which were during Group 1 status.) - Cats Fun (2006), Grand Journey (2008), Dreamaway (2011), Respondent (2014), Delicacy (2015), Arcadia Dream (2016), Action (2018), Regal Power (2019), Tuscan Queen (2020), Western Empire (2021), Awesome John (2023), Sentimental Legend (2026)
- Railway Stakes - (7) - Elite Belle (2014), Galaxy Star (2018), Regal Power (2019), Inspirational Girl (2020), Western Empire (2021), Watch Me Rock (2025), Cosmic Crusader (2026)
- Perth Cup - (5) - Crown Prosecutor (2005), Real Love (2015), Mississippi Delta (2020), Casino Seventeen (2024), Apulia (2026)
- Winterbottom Stakes - (3) - Ellicorsam (2004), Hadabeclorka (2010), Graceful Girl (2021)
- Kingston Town Classic - (2) - Perfect Reflection (2015), Arcadia Queen (2018)
- The Gold Rush - (2) - The Astrologist (2022), Rey Magnerio (2025)

Melbourne

- All-Star Mile - (1) - Regal Power (2020)
- Caulfield Guineas - (1) - Ole Kirk (2020)
- Caulfield Stakes - (1) - Arcadia Queen (2020)
- William Reid Stakes - (1) - Masked Crusader (2021)
- Oakleigh Plate - (1) - Celebrity Queen (2021)
- P B Lawrence Stakes - (1) - Cosmic Crusader (2026)
- Turnbull Stakes - (1) - Cosmic Crusader (2026)
- Cox Plate - (1) - Cosmic Crusader (2026)

Brisbane

- J. J. Atkins - (1) - Sheeza Belter (2022)
- Sires' Produce Stakes - (1) - Sheeza Belter (2022)
- Queensland Oaks - (1) - Gypsy Goddess (2022)

Sydney

- Randwick City Stakes - (1) - Zeyrek (2022)
- Phar Lap Stakes - (1) - Mr Mozart (2022)
- Breeders Classic - (1) - Sheeza Belter (2022)
- Silver Shadow Stakes - (1) - Zougotcha (2022)

Hong Kong

- Bauhinia Sprint Trophy - (1) - Craig's Dragon (2010)
