= Cosmic Crusader (horse) =

Australian Thoroughbred racehorse

- Sire: Maurice
- Grandsire: Screen Hero
- Dam: Cosmic Storm
- Damsire: Street Sense
- Sex: Gelding
- Foaled: 2 November 2020 (age 6)
- Country: New Zealand
- Color: Bay
- Breeder: Peters Investments
- Owner: Peters Investments
- Trainer: Donna Riordan/Michael Grantham/Andrea Leek
- Jockey: Joseph Azzopardi/Clint Johnston-Porter/William Pike
- Record: 26: 13–4–4
- Earnings: $8,211,470

Major wins
- Northerly Stakes (2025); P B Lawrence Stakes (2026); Turnbull Stakes (2026); W. S. Cox Plate (2026); Railway Stakes (2026)

Cosmic Crusader is a four-time Group 1-winning Australian raced Thoroughbred racehorse. Born in New Zealand and raised in Australia by owner Bob Peters, Cosmic Crusader was sired by the champion Japanese racehorse Maurice. After a relatively uneventful early career in Western Australia, winning just two of his first eight starts, Cosmic Crusader would become one of the best middle-distance horses in the country; he was sent to Melbourne in 2026 as a six-year-old, where he won both the Turnbull Stakes and the W. S. Cox Plate over 2000 meters, before returning home to Western Australia to win the Railway Stakes.

== Racing career ==
Cosmic Crusader was sired by the former Hong Kong Cup-winning Japanese racehorse Maurice, a six-time Group 1 winner. His dam, Cosmic Storm, previously raced in Western Australia for owner Bob Peters, most notably winning a Group 3 La Trice Classic at Ascot Racecourse in 2016. Although Cosmic Crusader was conceived in Australia, his dam was later sent to New Zealand in 2020 while in foal to breed with Charm Spirit, since Maurice was unable to shuttle back to Australia due to travel restrictions relating to the COVID-19 pandemic, resulting in Cosmic Crusader being born in New Zealand at Windsor Park Stud. His first barrier trials were at the Lark Hill training facility on 26 June and 10 July 2023 as a two-year-old, ridden by jockey Joseph Azzopardi.

=== Three-year-old season ===
His debut race was a zero metro wins handicap over 1200m at Belmont Park racecourse in July, winning by a half-nose. He was then rested through August before resuming in September as a three-year-old. Despite some promising runs, Cosmic Crusader would combine for just one win in his next seven starts before being rested the following March. He was later found to be having breathing issues affecting his runs, prompting owner Peters to undergo soft palate throat surgery.

=== Four-year-old season ===
Cosmic Crusader resumed racing in October at Ascot in a Bm66+ over 1200m, winning by a third of a length, followed by a Bm72+ two weeks later, winning by a half-length and ridden by Clint Johnston-Porter. Shortly thereafter, a leg injury meant he didn't race again until September of the following year.

=== Five-year-old season ===
Following a ten-month recovery, Cosmic Crusader resumed racing in September, once again in a Bm72+ and ridden by CJP, winning by 3.6 lengths. With another win, this time in Stakes company over 1650m and by a margin of 8.5 lengths, he was backed into favoritism for the Group 1 Railway Stakes in November. To qualify, he was nominated for the Group 3 Asian Beau Stakes over 1400m at Ascot. Despite being heavily backed into a $1.40 favourite, he finished third behind Watch Me Rock, failing to qualify. He again placed third in the Group 3 R J Peters Stakes two weeks later, meaning he did not meet the necessary rating to enter the race, leaving him as an emergency. He instead contested the Listed Carbine Club Stakes on Railway Stakes day, winning by 2.59 lengths. Two weeks later, Cosmic Crusader broke through for his first Group win in the Group 1 Northerly Stakes over 1800m, breaking away at the 100m along with former Asian Beau rival Watch Me Rock to lead the remaining field by over four lengths, fighting off the late challenge to win by a head. The race also marked the first Group 1-win of jockey Clint Johnston-Porter's career.

=== Six-year-old season ===
==== Move to Melbourne ====
In April 2026, it was announced that Cosmic Crusader would be sent to Melbourne, namely to target some of the feature races during the Spring Racing Carnival. He was assigned to trainer Andrea Leek. His first start in Melbourne would be the Group 3 Bletchingly Stakes at Caulfield Racecourse in July, ridden by Daniel Stackhouse. He would win comfortably by a widening margin of 2.5 lengths, with Stackhouse saying of the run: "He switches off at the right time and when you ask him to go he can really quicken and accelerate very fast, He’s got a lot better races to win than this but it’s a good kick-off point." His next race was the Group 2 P B Lawrence Stakes three weeks later, with Western Australia's William Pike being sent to Melbourne for the ride. Coincidentally, Pike had also ridden Crusader's dam on several occasions, including in her La Trice win.

After minor placings in the Memsie and Underwood Stakes, Cosmic Crusader won his second Group 1 race, the Turnbull Stakes, on 3 October at Flemington over 2000m. Ridden by Pike, he settled midfield, tracking the speed before running on to leader Light Infantry Man at the 200m mark to win by one and a half lengths. Two weeks later, he started as the favorite in the Caulfield Cup over 2400m, finishing fourth in a race where two riders lost their mounts. On 24 October, Cosmic Crusader won the Cox Plate, settling near last before running on to leader Birdman at the straight to win by three-quarters of a length. It was the first win in a Cox Plate by a West Australian-based horse since Northerly, who won the race twice successively in 2001 and 2002. In his final appearance in Melbourne for the season, Cosmic Crusader finished runner-up to Birdman in the Champions Stakes at Flemington.

==== Return to Perth ====
In late October/early November, it was announced that Cosmic Crusader would return to Perth for the Ascot Racing Carnival. He was nominated for the Railway Stakes, the Northerly Stakes and The Gold Rush. After being allocated the maximum penalty weight of 61 kilograms for the Railway Stakes, he drew barrier 6. He started as the favorite, settling one off the fence midfield, before running on from the outside to win by one-and-a-half lengths. Jockey William Pike said of the ride: "To win under that weight is absolutely extraordinary, and especially when we had to come so wide on the bend. I thought our chances were shot. We had a nice enough run in transit, but then we kept getting carted wider and wider at the turn. I thought he couldn’t possibly do it. He’s so good. To finish over the top of them like that, after coming so wide, is just a great effort." It was the heaviest handicap weight carried by a winner in the Railway Stakes since Limber in 1901 and drew further comparisons to Northerly, who finished 11th in 2001 with 61.5 kilograms after winning the Cox Plate.

== Race record ==
Record: 26:13–4–4

2022–23 season
Result	Date	Race	Venue	Group	Distance	Weight (kg)	Jockey	Winner/2nd
Won	19 Jul 2023	Tabtouch - Have You Got The Touch Plate	Belmont	N/A	1200 m	57	J. Azzopardi	2nd - Janny

2023–24 season
Result	Date	Race	Venue	Group	Distance	Weight (kg)	Jockey	Winner/2nd
6th	30 Sep 2023	Belmont Park Free Entry Handicap	Belmont	N/A	1400 m	54	J. Azzopardi	1st - Playhouse Patron
Won	14 Oct 2023	Schweppes Handicap	Ascot	N/A	1600 m	55	J. Azzopardi	2nd - Ace Command
3rd	28 Oct 2023	Blue Alpine Crown Handicap	Ascot	N/A	1400 m	54	J. Azzopardi	1st - Amber Glide
4th	11 Nov 2023	Happy 90th Birthday Lorna Ward Handicap	Ascot	N/A	1600 m	57.5	J. Azzopardi	1st - Desennea
6th	25 Nov 2023	WA Guineas	Ascot	Group 2	1600 m	56.5	J. Azzopardi	1st - Zipaway
7th	2 Mar 2024	Lex Piper Stakes	Ascot	Listed	1600 m	55.5	B. Parnham	1st - Russian To The Bar
2nd	16 Mar 2024	Mrs Mac's Handicap	Ascot	N/A	1600 m	54	B. Parnham	1st - Knot Secret

2024–25 season
Result	Date	Race	Venue	Group	Distance	Weight (kg)	Jockey	Winner/2nd
Won	12 Oct 2024	2024 Pinnacles Carnival Handicap	Ascot	N/A	1200 m	57	J. Azzopardi	2nd - Keep Attacking
Won	26 Oct 2024	BallPoint Construction Handicap	Ascot	N/A	1400 m	55	J. Azzopardi	2nd - Antique Miss

2025–26 season
Result	Date	Race	Venue	Group	Distance	Weight (kg)	Jockey	Winner/2nd
Won	13 Sep 2025	Mca Polytrack Handicap	Ascot	N/A	1400 m	57.5	C. Johnston-Porter	2nd - Shmoov Moova
Won	20 Sep 2025	Tabtouch Stakes	Ascot	N/A	1650 m	54.5	C. Johnston-Porter	2nd - Sensessional
3rd	1 Nov 2025	Asian Beau Stakes	Ascot	Group 3	1400 m	54	C. Johnston-Porter	1st - Watch Me Rock
3rd	15 Nov 2025	R J Peters Stakes	Ascot	Group 3	1500 m	54	C. Johnston-Porter	1st - Storyville
Won	22 Nov 2025	Carbine Club Stakes	Ascot	Listed	1400 m	57.5	C. Johnston-Porter	2nd - Aztec Ruler
Won	6 Dec 2025	Northerly Stakes	Ascot	Group 1	1800 m	59	C. Johnston-Porter	2nd - Watch Me Rock
2nd	13 Dec 2025	The Gold Rush	Ascot	Group 3	1400 m	59	C. Johnston-Porter	1st - Rey Magnerio

2026–27 season
Result	Date	Race	Venue	Group	Distance	Weight (kg)	Jockey	Winner/2nd
Won	25 Jul 2026	Bletchingly Stakes	Caulfield	Group 3	1200 m	58.5	D. Stackhouse	2nd - Winnasedge
Won	15 Aug 2026	P B Lawrence Stakes	Caulfield	Group 2	1400 m	59	W. Pike	2nd - Private Eye
3rd	29 Aug 2026	Memsie Stakes	Caulfield	Group 1	1400 m	59	W. Pike	1st - Beiwacht
2nd	19 Sep 2026	Underwood Stakes	Caulfield	Group 1	1800 m	59	W. Pike	1st - Birdman
Won	3 Oct 2026	Turnbull Stakes	Flemington	Group 1	2000 m	58	W. Pike	2nd - Light Infantry Man
4th	17 Oct 2026	Caulfield Cup	Caulfield	Group 1	2400 m	56	W. Pike	1st - Kingswood
Won	24 Oct 2026	W. S. Cox Plate	Flemington	Group 1	2040 m	59	W. Pike	2nd - Birdman
2nd	7 Nov 2026	Champions Stakes	Flemington	Group 1	2000 m	59	W. Pike	1st - Birdman
Won	21 Nov 2026	Railway Stakes	Ascot	Group 1	1600 m	61	W. Pike	2nd - King Of Light

== Pedigree ==
Pedigree of Cosmic Crusader, bay gelding, foaled 2 November 2020
Sire Maurice b. 2011 (JPN)	Screen Hero ch. 2004 (JPN)	Grass Wonder (USA)	Silver Hawk (USA)
Sire Maurice b. 2011 (JPN)	Screen Hero ch. 2004 (JPN)	Grass Wonder (USA)	Ameriflora (USA)
Sire Maurice b. 2011 (JPN)	Screen Hero ch. 2004 (JPN)	Running Heroine (JPN)	Sunday Silence (USA)
Sire Maurice b. 2011 (JPN)	Screen Hero ch. 2004 (JPN)	Running Heroine (JPN)	Dyna Actress (JPN)
Sire Maurice b. 2011 (JPN)	Mejiro Frances b. 2001 (JPN)	Carnegie (IRE)	Sadler's Wells (USA)
Sire Maurice b. 2011 (JPN)	Mejiro Frances b. 2001 (JPN)	Carnegie (IRE)	Detroit (FR)
Sire Maurice b. 2011 (JPN)	Mejiro Frances b. 2001 (JPN)	Mejiro Monterey (JPN)	Mogami (FR)
Sire Maurice b. 2011 (JPN)	Mejiro Frances b. 2001 (JPN)	Mejiro Monterey (JPN)	Mejiro Quincey (JPN)
Dam Cosmic Storm br. 2011 (AUS)	Street Sense dk/b. 2004 (USA)	Street Cry (IRE)	Machiavellian (USA)
Dam Cosmic Storm br. 2011 (AUS)	Street Sense dk/b. 2004 (USA)	Street Cry (IRE)	Helen Street (GB)
Dam Cosmic Storm br. 2011 (AUS)	Street Sense dk/b. 2004 (USA)	Bedazzle (USA)	Dixieland Band (USA)
Dam Cosmic Storm br. 2011 (AUS)	Street Sense dk/b. 2004 (USA)	Bedazzle (USA)	Majestic Legend (USA)
Dam Cosmic Storm br. 2011 (AUS)	Stormy Nova br. 2001 (AUS)	Metal Storm (FR)	Kenmare (FR)
Dam Cosmic Storm br. 2011 (AUS)	Stormy Nova br. 2001 (AUS)	Metal Storm (FR)	Porphyrine (FR)
Dam Cosmic Storm br. 2011 (AUS)	Stormy Nova br. 2001 (AUS)	Pro Challenge (AUS)	Protos (USA)
Dam Cosmic Storm br. 2011 (AUS)	Stormy Nova br. 2001 (AUS)	Pro Challenge (AUS)	Carousel Challenge (AUS) (Family: C10)

- Cosmic Crusader is an inbred by 5 x 5 to Northern Dancer (Sadler's Wells's and Dixieland Band's sire) and 5 x 5 to Mr Prospector (Machiavellian's and Protos's sire).
