= Railway Stakes =

Railway Stakes may refer to:

- Railway Stakes (Perth racing), a horse race held by Perth Racing at Ascot Racecourse in Australia
- Railway Stakes (Ireland), a horse race held at the Curragh in Ireland
- Railway Stakes (New Zealand), a horse race held at Ellerslie Racecourse in New Zealand
