= La Trice Classic =

Australian horse race

- Class: Group 3
- Location: Ascot Racecourse
- Inaugurated: 2003
- Race type: Thoroughbred
- Sponsor: Mrs Mac's (2019-2026)

Race information
- Distance: 1,800 metres
- Surface: Turf
- Track: Left-handed
- Qualification: Fillies and mares three year old and older
- Weight: Set weights with penalties
- Purse: A$200,000 (2026)

The La Trice Classic is a Perth Racing Group 3 Thoroughbred horse race for fillies and mares that are three-year-olds and older, held under set weights with penalties over 1800 metres, at Ascot Racecourse in Perth, Western Australia each year in January.

== History ==
The race is named in honour of La Trice, a Western Australian mare who was the first horse to win the Karrakatta Plate and Railway Stakes double in 1967/68. She also won consecutive Winterbottom Stakes in 1970/71.

Since 2011 the race is run on Perth Cup race meeting card.

In 2025 Western Australian breeder Bob Peters achieved his sixth win in the race as an owner.

=== Grade ===
- prior 2014 - Listed race
- 2014 onwards - Group 3

== Winners ==
The following are winners of the race.

- 2026 - Luvnwar
- 2025 - Antique Miss
- 2024 - Yonga Lass
- 2023 - Alsephina
- 2022 - Beret
- 2021 - Dance Music
- 2020 - Perfect Jewel
- 2019 - Celebrity Dream
- 2018 - I'm Feeling Lucky
- 2016 (Dec) - Cosmic Storm
- 2016 (Jan) - Ideal Image
- 2015 - Vampi Lass
- 2014 - Elite Belle
- 2013 - Mabel Grace
- 2012 - race not held
- 2011 - Rosie Rocket
- 2010 - Tranquility
- 2009 - Impressive Jeuney
- 2008 (Dec) - Sky Drama
- 2008 (Jan) - Russian Playmate
- 2007 - Keyton Grace
- 2006 - Belle Bizarre
- 2005 - Urban Chill
- 2004 - Kentiara
- 2003 - Fortune Streak

== See also ==
- List of Australian Group races
- Group races
