= Better Loosen Up =

Australian-bred Thoroughbred racehorse

- Sire: Loosen Up (USA)
- Grandsire: Never Bend
- Dam: Better Fantasy
- Damsire: Better Boy (IRE)
- Sex: Gelding
- Foaled: 29 August 1985
- Died: 15 March 2016 (aged 30)
- Country: Australia
- Colour: Bay
- Breeder: Howard Martin
- Owner: L. & G. Theodore, L. Koumi, L. Fink, G.+ J.+ I. Farrah
- Trainer: Les Theodore (at 2); Bart Cummings (at 3); Colin Hayes (at 4); David Hayes (from 5 to 7)
- Record: 45: 17–9–3
- Earnings: A$4,773,970

Major wins
- Honda Stakes (1989); Railway Stakes (1989); Winfield Stakes (1989); W. S. Cox Plate (1990); Segenhoe Stakes (1990); LKS MacKinnon Stakes (1990); J F Feehan Stakes (1990); Blamey Stakes (1990, 1991); Turnbull Stakes (1990); Australian Cup (1991); International race wins: Japan Cup (1990)

Awards
- Australian Horse of the Year (1991)

Honours
- Australian Racing Hall of Fame (2004)
- Last updated on 13 June 2011

Better Loosen Up (foaled 29 August 1985 – died 15 March 2016) was an Australian Thoroughbred racehorse that won the Japan Cup in 1990 and was named Australia's champion racehorse in 1991. He campaigned from two to seven years of age, and won 17 of his 45 starts, including eight Group One races. In 2004, he was inducted into the Australian Racing Hall of Fame.

Better Loosen Up was a small bay gelding, by Loosen Up (USA) out of Better Fantasy by Better Boy (IRE). He was bred by Howard Martin and foaled in Berrigan, New South Wales. Loosen Up won the French Prix de l' Avre and was the sire of six stakes-winners in Australia with Better Loosen Up being the best one. Better Fantasy was the dam of 13 named foals, but Better Loosen Up was her only stakes-winner.

== Racing career ==
Under the care of Les Theodore, won one of his four starts as two-year-old, a maiden at Bendigo on 28 April 1988. At three, he was transferred to the Sydney stables of Bart Cummings, where he won four races and was runner-up in the Canterbury Guineas. At season's end, his record stood at a relatively unprepossessing five wins from 16 starts, although Les Theodore claims to have told the staff at Lindsay Park that the horse was a 'champion'.

Now trained by Colin Hayes, Better Loosen Up resumed late in the spring of 1989, on Caulfield Cup day, with a close second, and finished the year with three Group One wins in as many starts, in the Honda Stakes, the Winfield Stakes, and the Railway Stakes. In the new year, he defeated Super Impose and Vo Rogue in the Blamey and the Segenhoe Stakes, and was runner-up to Vo Rogue in the Australian Cup in between. In his final starts for the season, he was defeated by Sydeston on heavy tracks in the Mercedes Classic and Queen Elizabeth Stakes. At five, under the care of David Hayes (Colin Hayes had retired at the end of the 1989–1990 season), Better Loosen Up was better again. After a first-up defeat in the Liston Stakes, he was undefeated for the rest of the season, and, in successive races, took out the Feehan Stakes, the Turnbull Stakes, the Cox Plate, the Mackinnon Stakes, the Japan Cup, and, in the new year, the Blamey Stakes and the Australian Cup. In the Cox Plate, Better Loosen Up had come from an estimated 30 lengths off the lead to win in course-record time; in the Mackinnon Stakes, on Derby Day, he was one of a 'world record' six Group winners for his trainer; in the Japan Cup, he scored a thrilling win to racecaller Bryan Martin's cry of 'Better Loosen Up has won for Australia', and remains the only Australian horse to do so; in the Australian Cup, he defeated Vo Rogue by 5 1/2 lengths. Following this season, Better Loosen Up was named Australia's champion racehorse in 1991.

A leg injury, which had cut short his autumn campaign, restricted him to just 12 further starts, at six and seven, and he failed to reach the same heights. His best performance came in the Cox Plate of 1992, where he was beaten just over a length by Super Impose, and successfully protested against Let's Elope, who was second past-the-post. He was retired in February 1993, within days of Super Impose, with which he would star on 'Super Better Best' – the story of how two geldings rose from obscurity to amass a '$10 million fortune'.

== In retirement ==
Better Loosen Up lived at Living Legends, The International Home of Rest for Champion Horses in the Melbourne suburb of Greenvale before his death in 2016.

== Pedigree ==
Pedigree of Better Loosen Up (AUS), bay gelding, 1985
Sire Loosen Up (USA) Br. 1973	Never Bend; 1960	Nasrullah	Nearco
Sire Loosen Up (USA) Br. 1973	Never Bend; 1960	Nasrullah	Mumtaz Begum
Sire Loosen Up (USA) Br. 1973	Never Bend; 1960	Lalun	Djeddah
Sire Loosen Up (USA) Br. 1973	Never Bend; 1960	Lalun	Be Faithful
Sire Loosen Up (USA) Br. 1973	Dancing Hostess; 1964	Sword Dancer	Sunglow
Sire Loosen Up (USA) Br. 1973	Dancing Hostess; 1964	Sword Dancer	Highland Fling
Sire Loosen Up (USA) Br. 1973	Dancing Hostess; 1964	Your Hostess	Alibhai
Sire Loosen Up (USA) Br. 1973	Dancing Hostess; 1964	Your Hostess	Boudoir
Dam Better Fantasy Br or bl. 1975	Better Boy (IRE); 1951	My Babu	Djebel
Dam Better Fantasy Br or bl. 1975	Better Boy (IRE); 1951	My Babu	Perfume
Dam Better Fantasy Br or bl. 1975	Better Boy (IRE); 1951	Better So	Mieuxce
Dam Better Fantasy Br or bl. 1975	Better Boy (IRE); 1951	Better So	Soga
Dam Better Fantasy Br or bl. 1975	Pure Fantasy; 1968	Niksar	Le Haar
Dam Better Fantasy Br or bl. 1975	Pure Fantasy; 1968	Niksar	Niskampe
Dam Better Fantasy Br or bl. 1975	Pure Fantasy; 1968	Alecon	Dalray
Dam Better Fantasy Br or bl. 1975	Pure Fantasy; 1968	Alecon	Boot Maid (Family: 7-d)
