= Bletchingly Stakes =

- Class: Group 3
- Location: Caulfield Racecourse
- Inaugurated: 1994
- Race type: Thoroughbred
- Sponsor: The Big Screen Company (2016-2026)

Race information
- Distance: 1,200 metres
- Surface: Turf
- Qualification: Maidens ineligible
- Weight: Weight for age
- Purse: $200,000 (2026)

The Bletchingly Stakes is a Melbourne Racing Club Group 3 Thoroughbred horse race held under Weight for age conditions, over a distance of 1200 metres at Caulfield Racecourse, Melbourne, Australia annually in July and is the last Group race held in Melbourne each season.

== History ==
=== Name ===
The race was first held in 1992 and is named in honour of the former champion racehorse and sire Bletchingly.

=== Venue ===
- 1994–2016: Caulfield Racecourse
- 2017: Sandown Racecourse
- 2018 onwards: Caulfield Racecourse

=== Distance ===
- 1994–2003 – 1100 metres
- 2004 onwards - 1200 metres

=== Grade ===
- 1994–1996 - Listed race
- 1997 - Group 3 status

== Winners ==
The following are past winners of the race.

- 2026 - Cosmic Crusader
- 2025 - Bridal Waltz
- 2024 - Recommendation
- 2023 - Ingratiating
- 2022 - King Of Sparta
- 2021 - Sansom
- 2020 - Viridine
- 2019 - Scales Of Justice
- 2018 - Vega Magic
- 2017 - Ability
- 2016 - Lord Of The Sky
- 2015 - Smokin' Joey
- 2014 - Thiamandi
- 2013 - Second Effort
- 2012 - Ready To Rip
- 2011 - Mid Summer Music
- 2010 - Shoot Out
- 2009 - Let Go Thommo
- 2008 - Commanding Hope
- 2007 - Apache Cat
- 2006 - Minson
- 2005 - Regal Roller
- 2004 - Le Zagaletta
- 2003 - Super Elegant
- 2002 - Rubitano
- 2001 - Windigo
- 2000 - Dandy Kid
- 1999 - Sports
- 1998 - Jugulator
- 1997 - Blazing Reality
- 1996 - You Remember
- 1995 - You Remember
- 1994 - Poetic King

== See also ==
- List of Australian Group races
- Group races
