= P B Lawrence Stakes =

P B Lawrence Stakes Registered as J J Liston Stakes
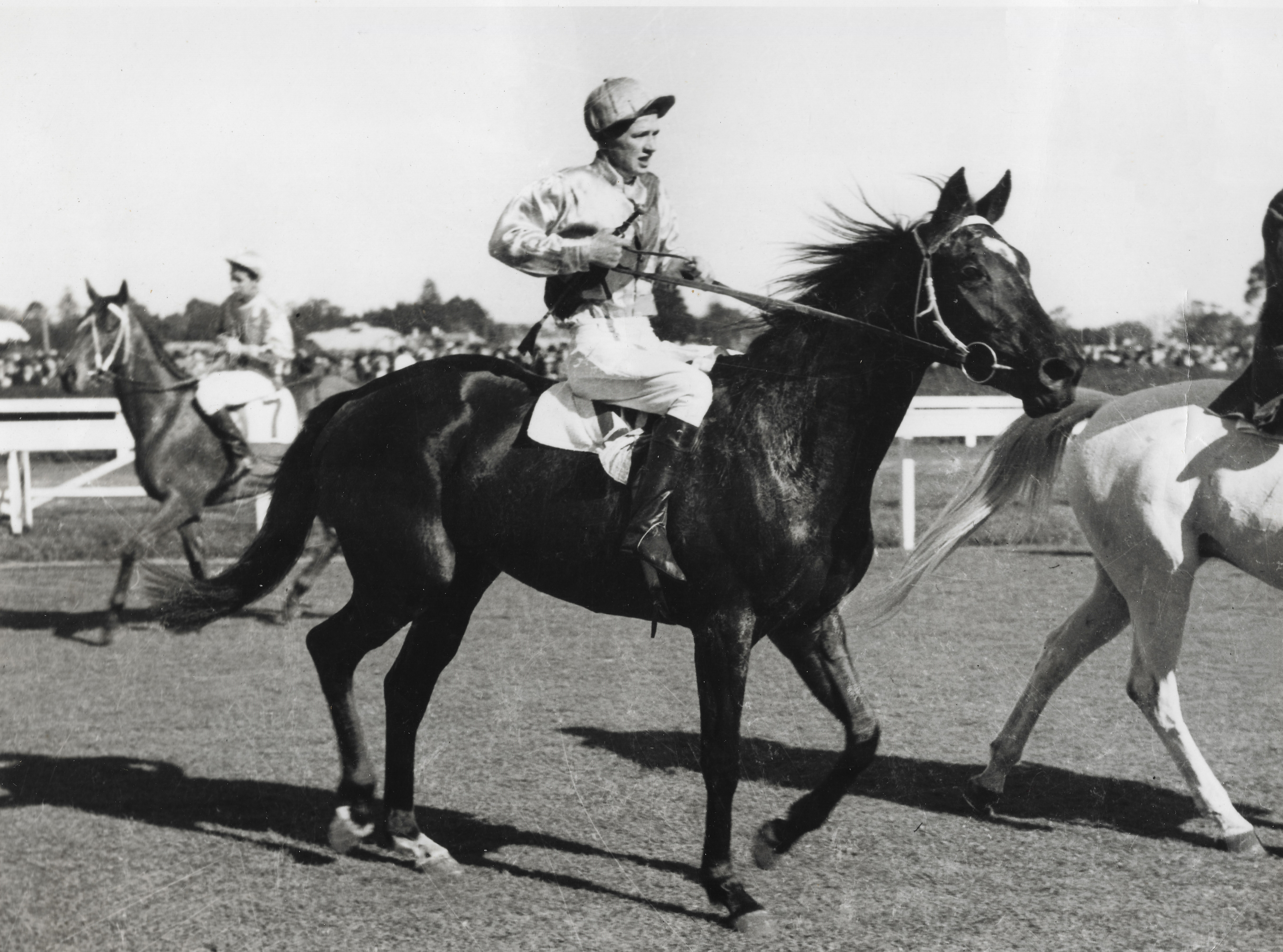
- Chicquita, 1951 winner
- Class: Group 2
- Location: Caulfield Racecourse
- Inaugurated: 1943
- Race type: Thoroughbred
- Sponsor: Catanach's Jewellers (2024-2026)

Race information
- Distance: 1,400 metres
- Surface: Turf
- Qualification: Three years old and older that are not maidens
- Weight: Weight for age
- Purse: $300,000 (2026)

The P B Lawrence Stakes, registered as the J J Liston Stakes, is a Melbourne Racing Club Group 2 Thoroughbred horse race held under weight for age conditions, for horses aged three years old and upwards, over a distance of 1400 metres, held at Caulfield Racecourse, Melbourne, Australia in August.

== History ==
The inaugural running of the race in 1943 was run at Flemington Racecourse and was won by Lawrence trained by 2004 Australian Racing Hall of Fame inductee Lou Robertson.

=== 1947 racebook ===
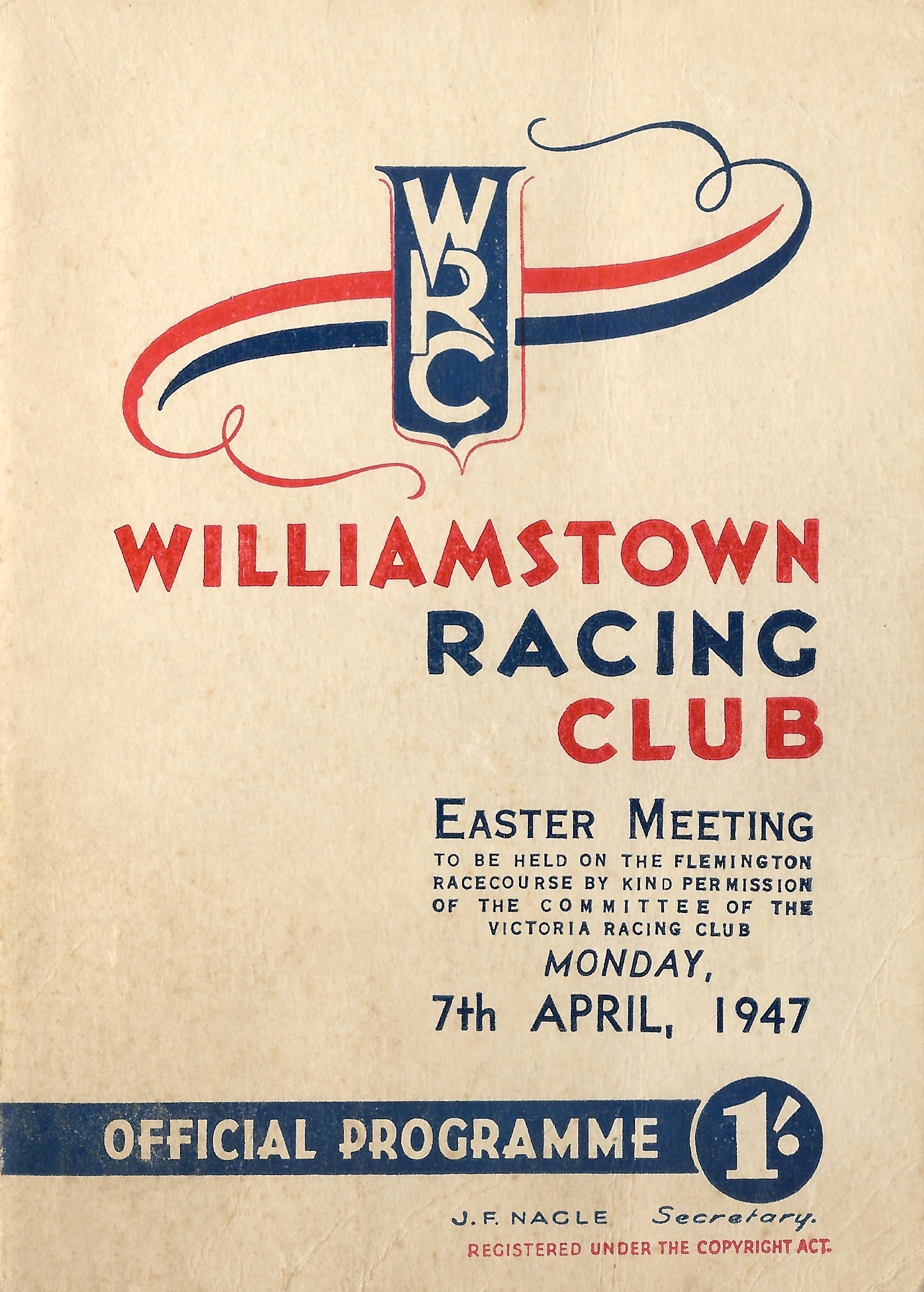
1947 WRC J.J.Liston Stakes racebook front cover

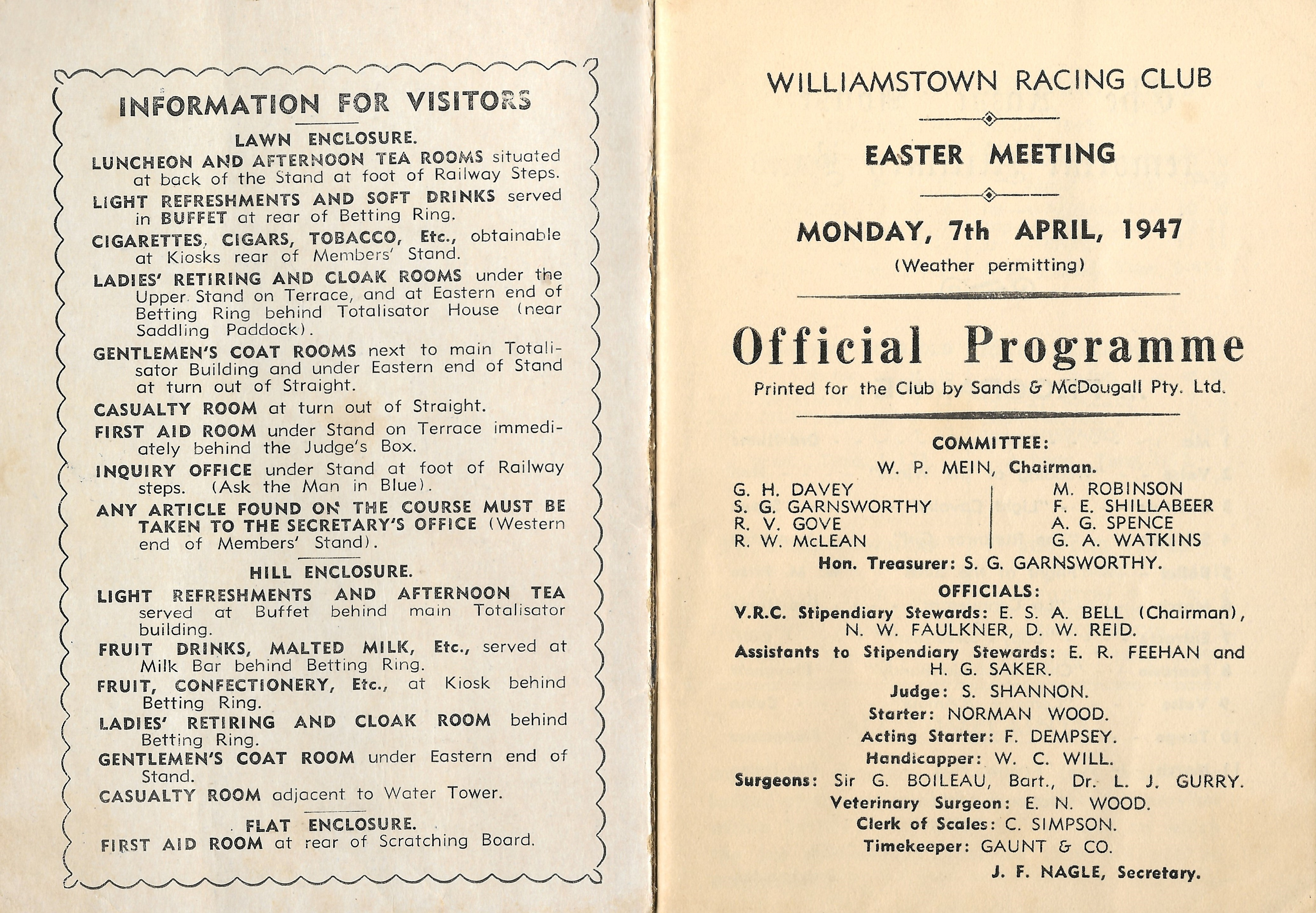
1947 WRC J.J.Liston Stakes officials & visitor information

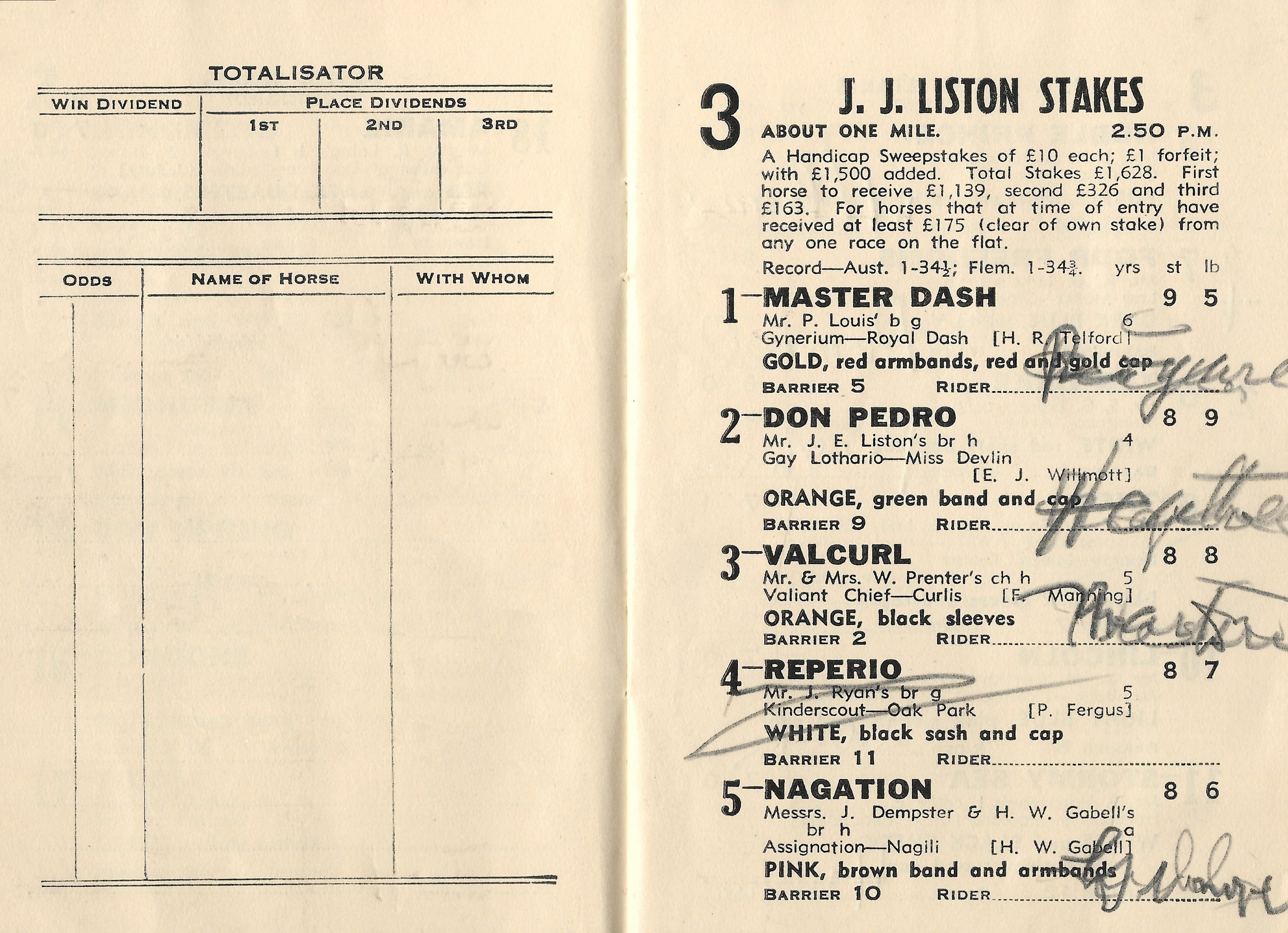
1947 WRC J.J.Liston Stakes showing the winner, Valcurl

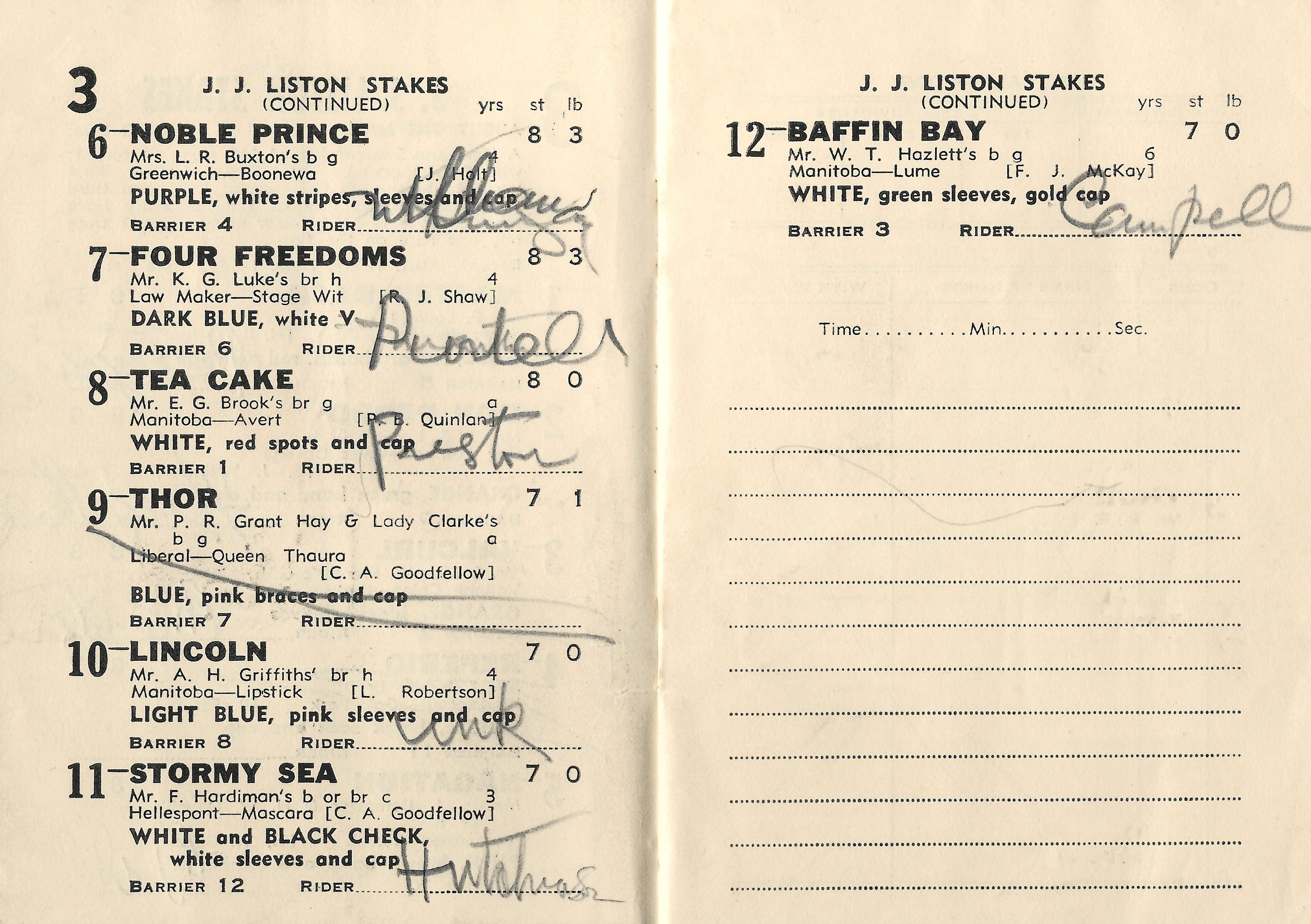
1947 WRC J.J.Liston Stakes starters and results

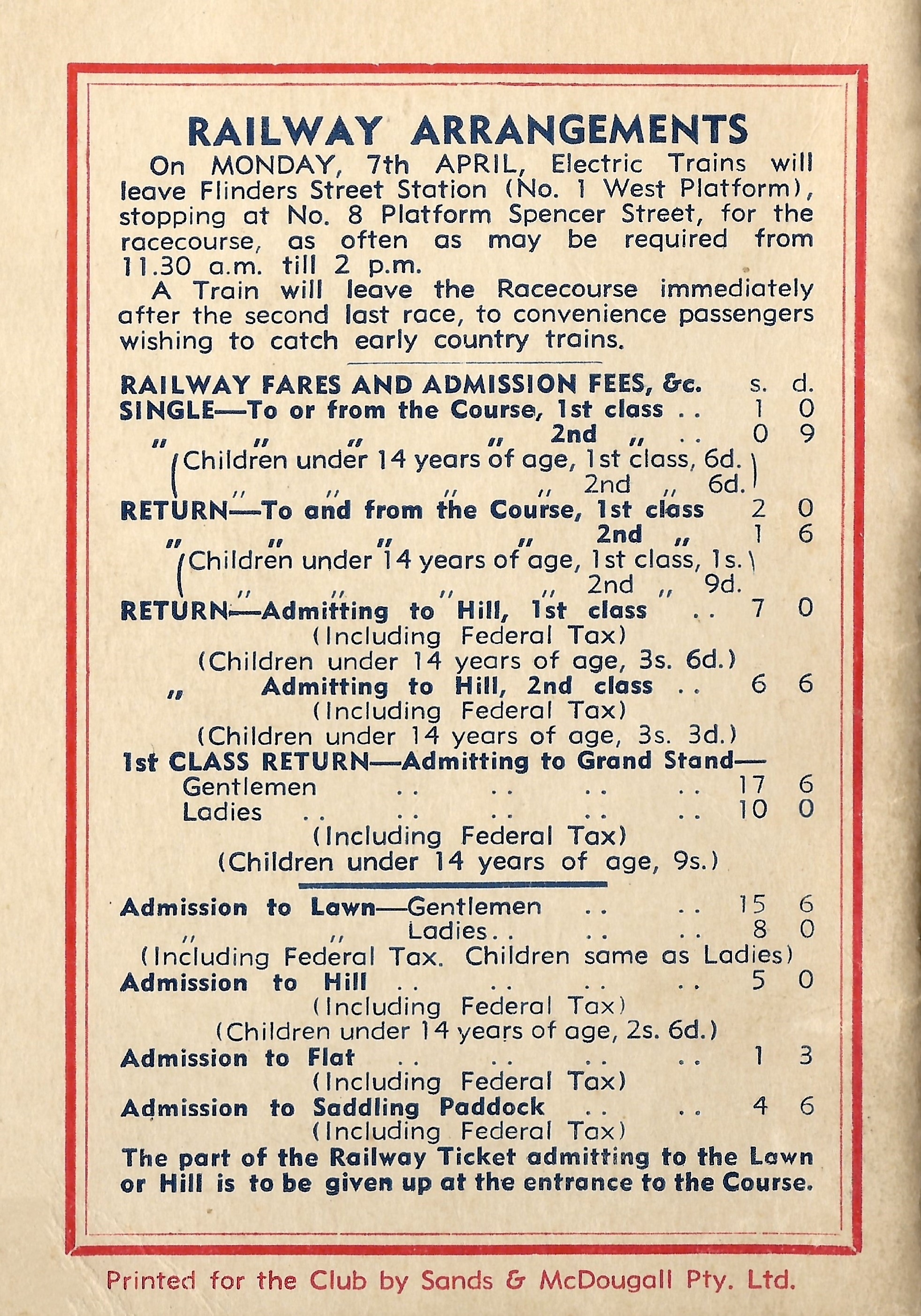
Back cover showing railway arrangements and admission fares

=== Name ===
The race name from 1943 to 2010 was the J J Liston Stakes, named after J. J. Liston (a prominent horse owner and president of the Williamstown Race Club). In 2011 the race name was changed to honour Peter B. Lawrence, who served 12 years as Chairman of the MRC.

=== Distance ===
- 1949–1964 – 1 mile (~1600m)
- 1965–1972 - 7 furlongs (~1400m)
- 1973 onwards – 1400 metres

=== Grade ===
- 1949–1978 – Principal Race
- 1979 onwards Group 2

=== Venue ===
- 1949–1964 – Flemington Racecourse
- 1965–1983 – Sandown Racecourse
- 1984 – Caulfield Racecourse
- 1985–1996 – Sandown Racecourse
- 1997 – Caulfield Racecourse
- 1998–2001 – Sandown Racecourse
- 2002 onwards – Caulfield Racecourse

== Winners ==
The following are past winners of the race.

- 2026 - Cosmic Crusader
- 2025 - Private Eye
- 2024 – Gentleman Roy
- 2023 – Mr Brightside
- 2022 – Mr Brightside
- 2021 – Sierra Sue
- 2020 – Savatiano
- 2019 – Mystic Journey
- 2018 – Showtime
- 2017 – Hartnell
- 2016 – Miss Rose De Lago
- 2015 – Mourinho
- 2014 – Star Rolling
- 2013 – Puissance De Lune
- 2012 – Second Effort
- 2011 – Whobegotyou
- 2010 – Shoot Out
- 2009 – Predatory Pricer
- 2008 – Light Fantastic
- 2007 – Apache Cat
- 2006 – Pompeii Ruler
- 2005 – Lad Of The Manor
- 2004 – Regal Roller
- 2003 – Super Elegant
- 2002 – Sports
- 2001 – Le Zagaletta
- 2000 – Skoozi Please
- 1999 – Inaflury
- 1998 – Vonanne
- 1997 – Happy Star
- 1996 – Delsole
- 1995 – Baryshnikov
- 1994 – Mahogany
- 1993 – Bundy Lad
- 1992 – Jim's Mate
- 1991 – Dr.Grace
- 1990 – Sydeston
- 1989 – Kairau Lad
- 1988 – My Steely Dan
- 1987 – Military Plume
- 1986 – Luther's Luck
- 1985 – King Delamere
- 1984 – Bow Mistress
- 1983 – Pleach
- 1982 – Cobra
- 1981 – Sovereign Red
- 1980 – Grey Sapphire
- 1979 – Waitangirua
- 1978 – So Called
- 1977 – Vice Regal
- 1976 – Bold Mayo
- 1975 – Wave King
- 1974 – Brandy Balloon
- 1973 – Zambari
- 1972 – Tauto
- 1971 – Tauto
- 1970 – Regal Vista
- 1969 – Maritana
- 1968 – Winfreux
- 1967 – Stellar Belle
- 1966 – Tobin Bronze
- 1965 – Samson
- 1964 – Craftsman
- 1963 – Nicopolis
- 1962 – My Peak
- 1961 – Anonyme
- 1960 – My Peak
- 1959 – Gay Saba
- 1958 – Lord
- 1957 – Syntax
- 1956 – Cyklon King
- 1955 – Cromis
- 1954 – Clear Springs
- 1953 – Bytact
- 1952 – Ellerslie
- 1951 – Chicquita
- 1950 – Clement
- 1949 – One Up
- 1948 - Flemish
- 1947 - Valcurl
- 1946 - Attley
- 1945 - Three O Three
- 1944 - Not Run
- 1943 - Lawrence

=== Recent multiple winners ===
Jockeys

- Craig Williams (2017, 2022 and 2023)
- Damien Oliver (2001, 2011 and 2016)

Trainers

- Ben, Will & JD Hayes (2023 & 2024) and Ben & J D Hayes (2022)

== See also ==
- Quezette Stakes
- Vain Stakes
- List of Australian Group races
- Group races
