= Northerly Stakes (Group 1) =

Annual horse race in Perth, Western Australia

- Class: Group 1
- Location: Ascot Racecourse
- Inaugurated: 1976
- Race type: Thoroughbred
- Sponsor: Tabtouch (2025)

Race information
- Distance: 1,800 metres
- Surface: Turf
- Track: Left-handed
- Qualification: Three year old and older
- Weight: Weight for age
- Purse: A$1,500,000 (2025)

The Northerly Stakes, formerly known as the Kingston Town Classic, is a Perth Racing Group 1 Thoroughbred horse race run under Weight for Age conditions for three year olds and older over a distance of 1800 metres at Ascot Racecourse in Perth, Western Australia in early December.

== History ==
The race was previously named after the Australian Racing Hall of Fame horse, Kingston Town, who won the race in 1982. The stakemoney was increased to A$1 million in 2015. It was renamed the Northerly Stakes in 2022, and the prize money was increased to A$1.5 million. There was already a Group 3 race known as the Northerly Stakes at Perth, however that race was renamed as the Eurythmic Stakes.

=== Name ===
- 1976–1979 - Marlboro 50,000
- 1980–1983 - Western Mail Classic
- 1984–1987 - Rothwells Stakes
- 1988–1991 - Winfield Stakes
- 1992–1994 - Beat Diabetes 2 Stakes
- 1995–2006 - Fruit 'N' Veg Stakes
- 2007–2021 - Kingston Town Classic
- 2022 onwards - Northerly Stakes

=== Distance ===
- 1976–1998 – 1800 metres
- 1999–2000 – 1600 metres
- 2001–2002 – 1800 metres
- 2003 – 2000 metres
- 2004 onwards - 1800 metres

=== Grade ===
- 1976–1978 - Principal race
- 1979 onwards - Group 1

=== Double winners ===
Five horses have won it twice:

- Family of Man (1976, 1978), Summer Beau (1996/1997), Old Comrade (2000/2001), Niconero (2006, 2008), Playing God (2010/2011)

Thoroughbreds that have won the Railway Stakes – Kingston Town Classic double:

- Better Loosen Up (1989), Old Comrade (2001), Modem (2004), Sniper's Bullet (2009)

== Winners ==
The following are past winners of the race.

- 2025 - Cosmic Crusader
- 2024 - Light Infantry Man
- 2023 - Dom To Shoot
- 2022 - Amelia's Jewel
- 2021 - Regal Power
- 2020 - Truly Great
- 2019 - Kay Cee
- 2018 - Arcadia Queen
- 2017 - Pounamu
- 2016 - Stratum Star
- 2015 - Perfect Reflection
- 2014 - Moriarty
- 2013 - Ihtsahymn
- 2012 - Luckygray
- 2011 - Playing God
- 2010 - Playing God
- 2009 - Sniper's Bullet
- 2008 - Niconero
- 2007 - Megatic
- 2006 - Niconero
- 2005 - Early Express
- 2004 - Modem
- 2003 - True Steel
- 2002 - Blevvo
- 2001 - Old Comrade
- 2000 - Old Comrade
- 1999 - St. Clemens Belle
- 1998 - Old Nick
- 1997 - Summer Beau
- 1996 - Summer Beau
- 1995 - Forge On
- 1994 - Island Morn
- 1993 - Credit Account
- 1992 - Red Javelin
- 1991 - Old Role
- 1990 - Bar Landy
- 1989 - Better Loosen Up
- 1988 - Vo Rogue
- 1987 - Doodlakine Lass
- 1986 - Military Plume
- 1985 - Rant And Rave
- 1984 - Importune
- 1983 - Bounty Hawk
- 1982 - Kingston Town
- 1981 - Little Imagele
- 1980 - Sovereign Red
- 1979 - Mighty Kingdom
- 1978 - Family Of Man
- 1977 - Stormy Rex
- 1976 - Family Of Man

== See also ==
- Eurythmic Stakes, Group 3 race formerly called the Northerly Stakes
- Kingston Town Stakes (Randwick)
- List of Australian Group races
- Group races
