= Turnbull Stakes =

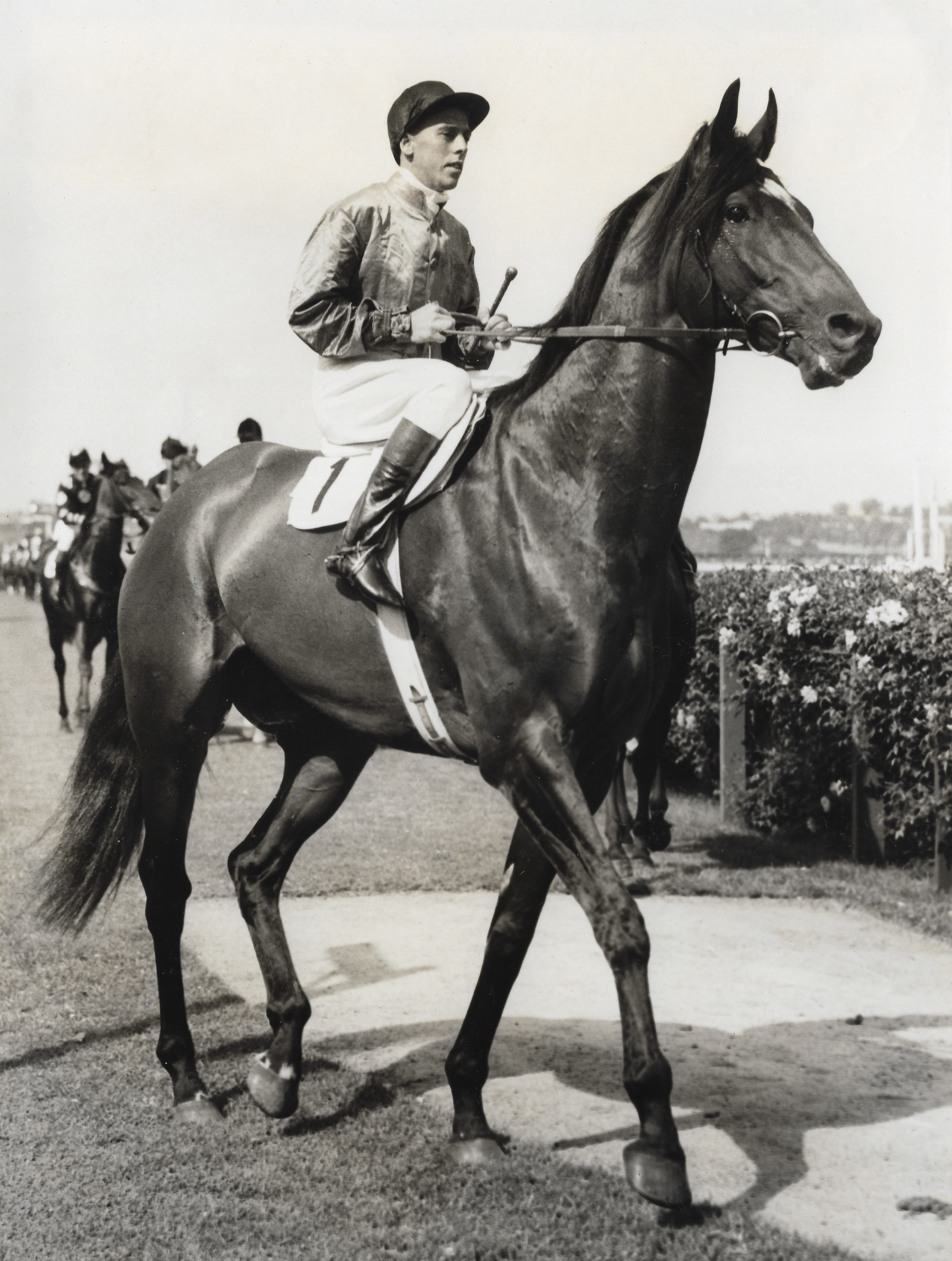
- Bernborough, 1946 winner
- Class: Group 1
- Location: Flemington Racecourse, Melbourne, Australia
- Inaugurated: 1865 (as VRC Royal Park Stakes)
- Race type: Thoroughbred - Flat racing
- Sponsor: TAB (2026)

Race information
- Distance: 2,000 metres
- Surface: Turf
- Track: Left-handed
- Qualification: Four years old and older that are not maidens
- Weight: Set weights with penalties
- Purse: A$750,000 (2026)
- Bonuses: Winner exempt from ballot in the Caulfield Cup

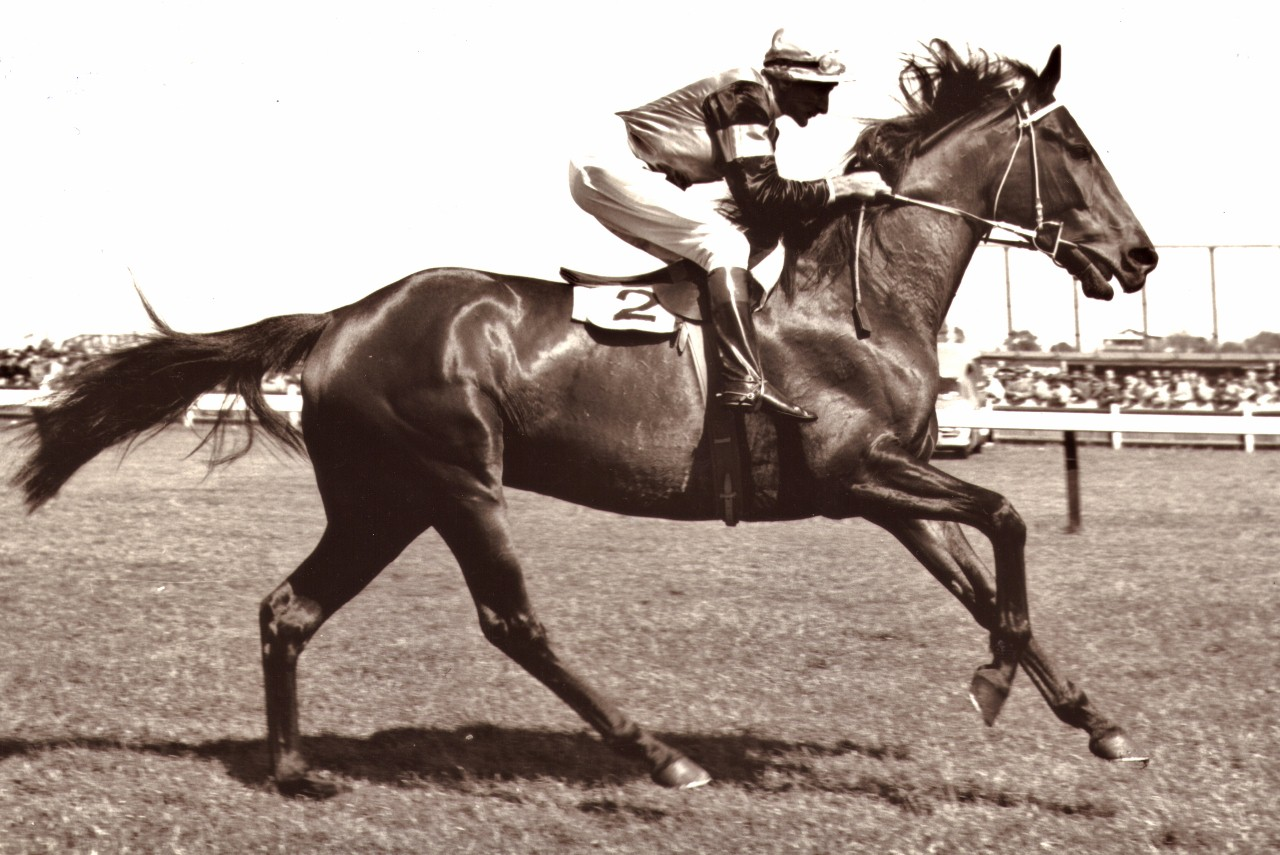
Rising Fast, 1954 winner

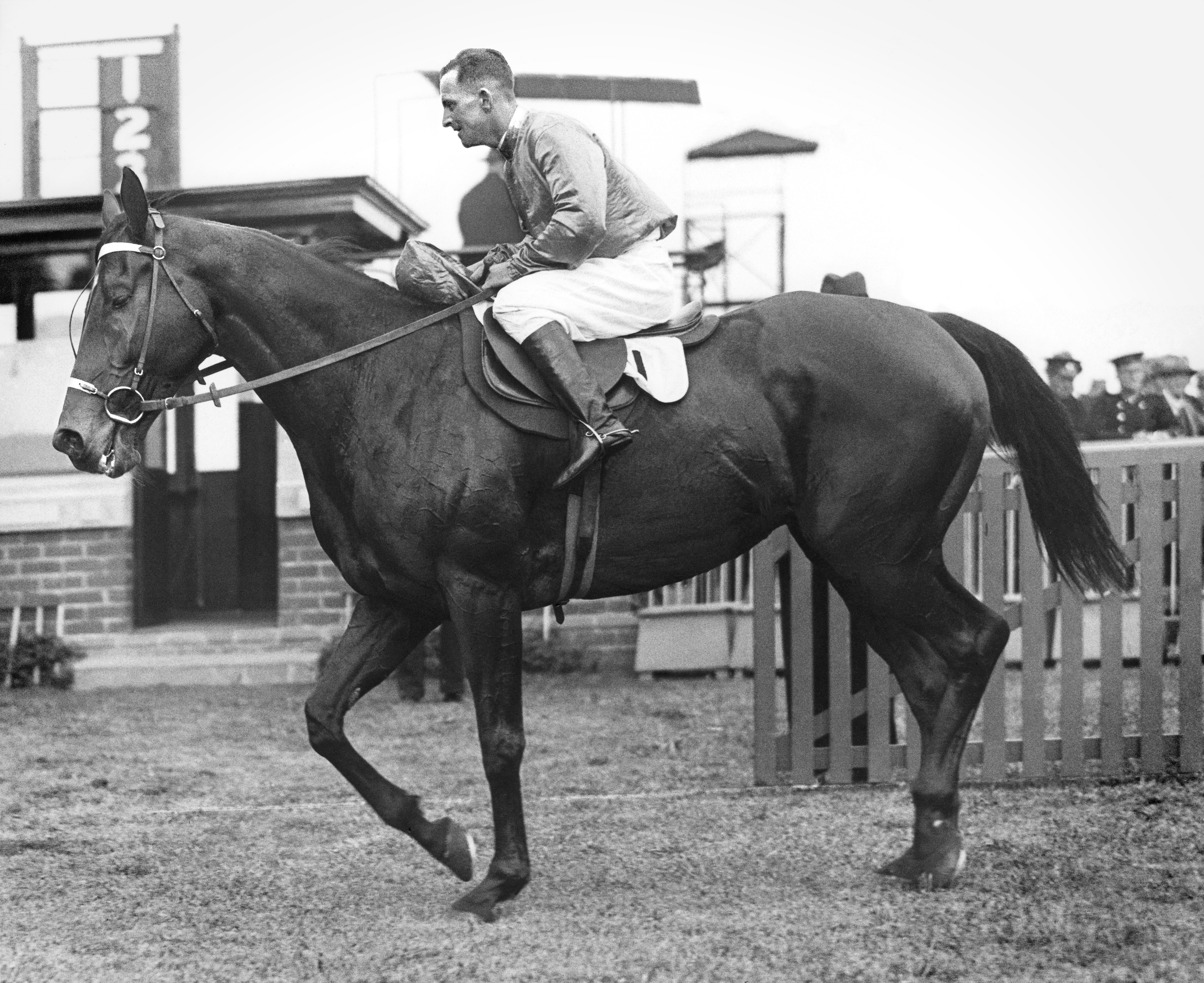
Amounis, 1930 winner

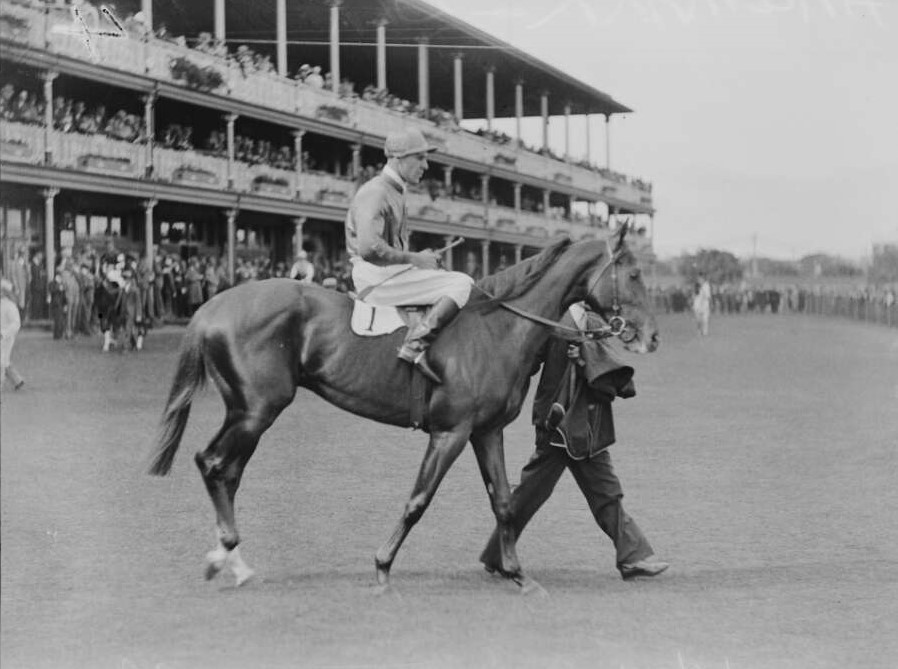
Hall Mark, 1934 winner

The Turnbull Stakes is a Victoria Racing Club Group 1 Thoroughbred horse race, for horses four years old and older, run under set weights with penalties conditions over a distance of 2,000 metres. The race is held at Flemington Racecourse, Melbourne, Australia in early October.

== History ==
It is one of the important races of the Spring Racing Carnival and is considered a major preparatory race for the Caulfield Cup, W S Cox Plate and for the Melbourne Cup.

=== Name ===
In 1948 the race was renamed after the Victoria Racing Club Chairman at the time Richard Turnbull.

The race has featured in the VRC Spring meet under different names.

- 1865–1894 - Royal Park Stakes
- 1895–1897 - September Stakes
- 1898–1936 - October Stakes
- 1937–1947 - Melbourne Stakes
- 1948–present - Turnbull Stakes
- 2000–2001 - Four'n Twenty Turnbull Stakes
- 2008 - Patinack Turnbull Stakes
- 2015–2016 - Yellowglen Turnbull Stakes
- 2017 Seppelt Turnbull Stakes
- 2018 onwards - TAB Turnbull Stakes

=== Grade ===
- 1865–1978 - Principal Race
- 1979–2005 - Group 2
- 2006 onwards - Group 1

=== Distance ===
- 1865–1883 – 2 miles (~3200 metres)
- 1884 - 1 3/4 miles (~2800 metres)
- 1885–1890 – 2 miles (~3200 metres)
- 1891 - 1 5/8 miles (~2600 metres)
- 1892–1894 - 1 1/2 miles (~2400 metres)
- 1895–1915 - 1 1/4 miles (~2000 metres)
- 1915–1922 - 1 1/2 miles (~2400 metres)
- 1923 - 1 1/4 miles (~2000 metres)
- 1924 - 1 1/8 miles (~1800 metres)
- 1925–1947 - 1 mile (~1600m)
- 1948–1970 - 1 1/2 miles (~2400 metres)
- 1971 - 1 1/4 miles (~2000 metres)
- 1972 onwards - 2000m

=== Conditions ===
- From 1864 to 1963 the race was run under Handicap conditions.
- From 1964 to 1970 the race was run under Weight for Age conditions.

=== 1948 racebook ===
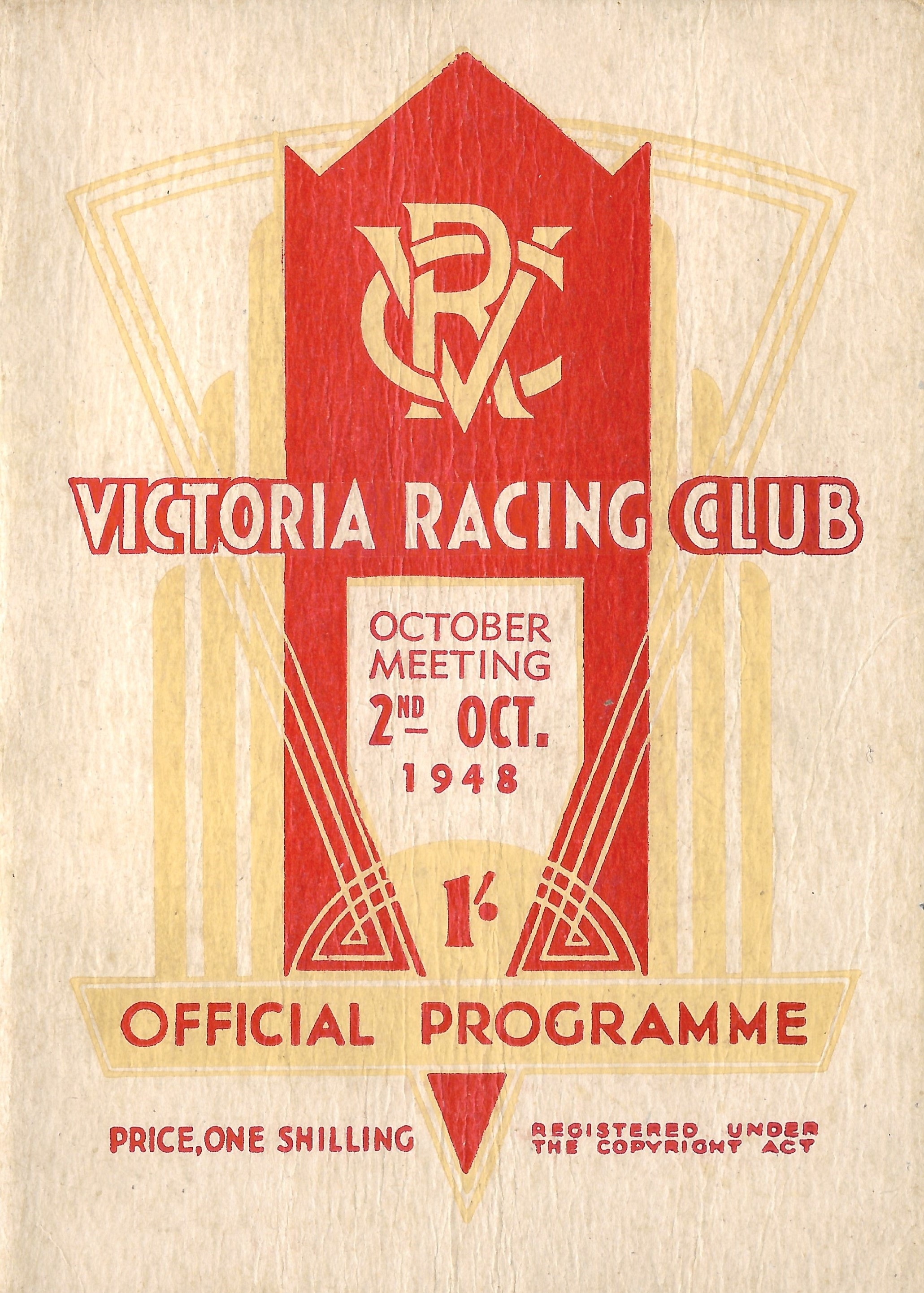
1948 VRC Turnbull Stakes racebook front cover

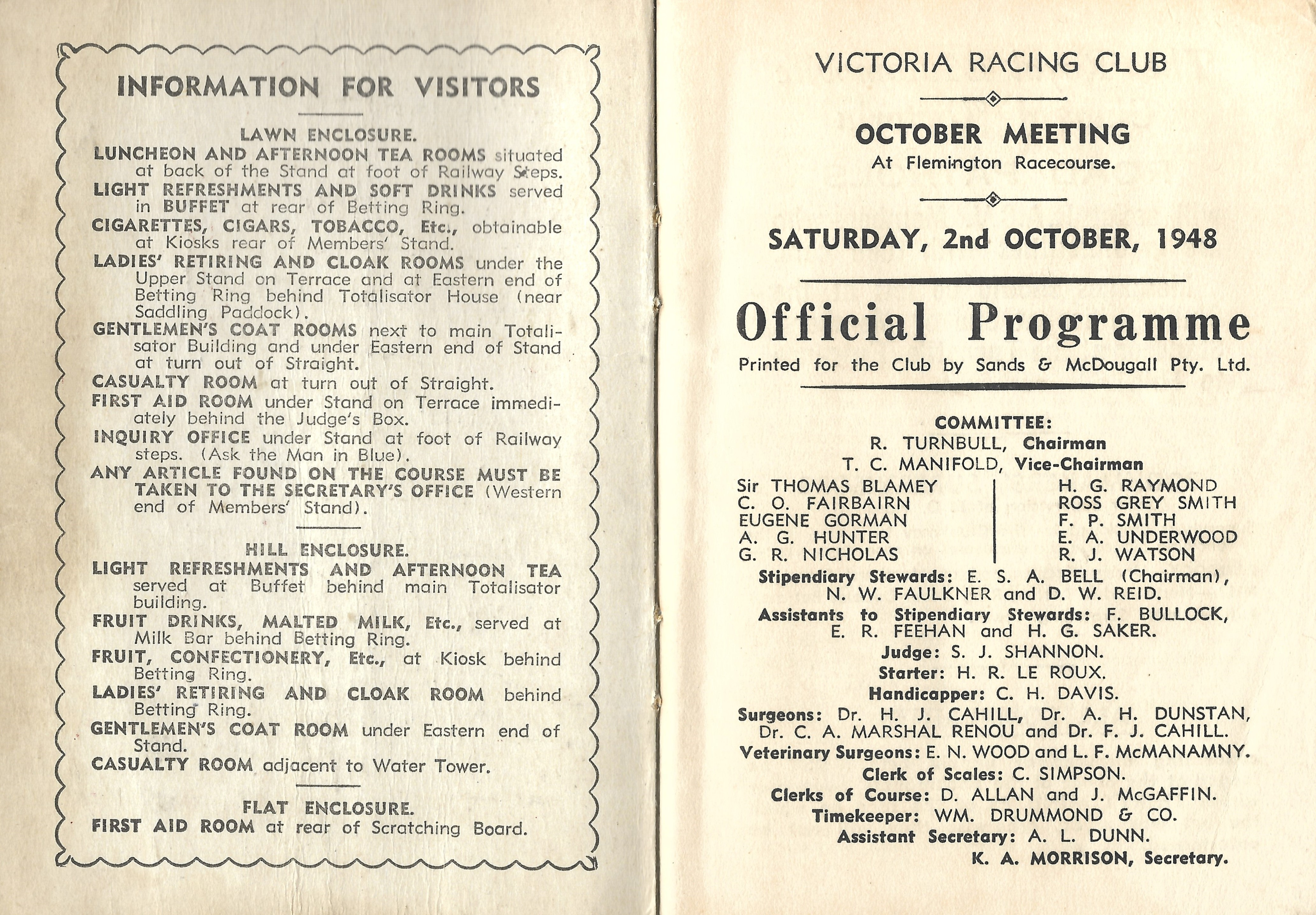
1948 VRC Turnbull Stakes raceday officials

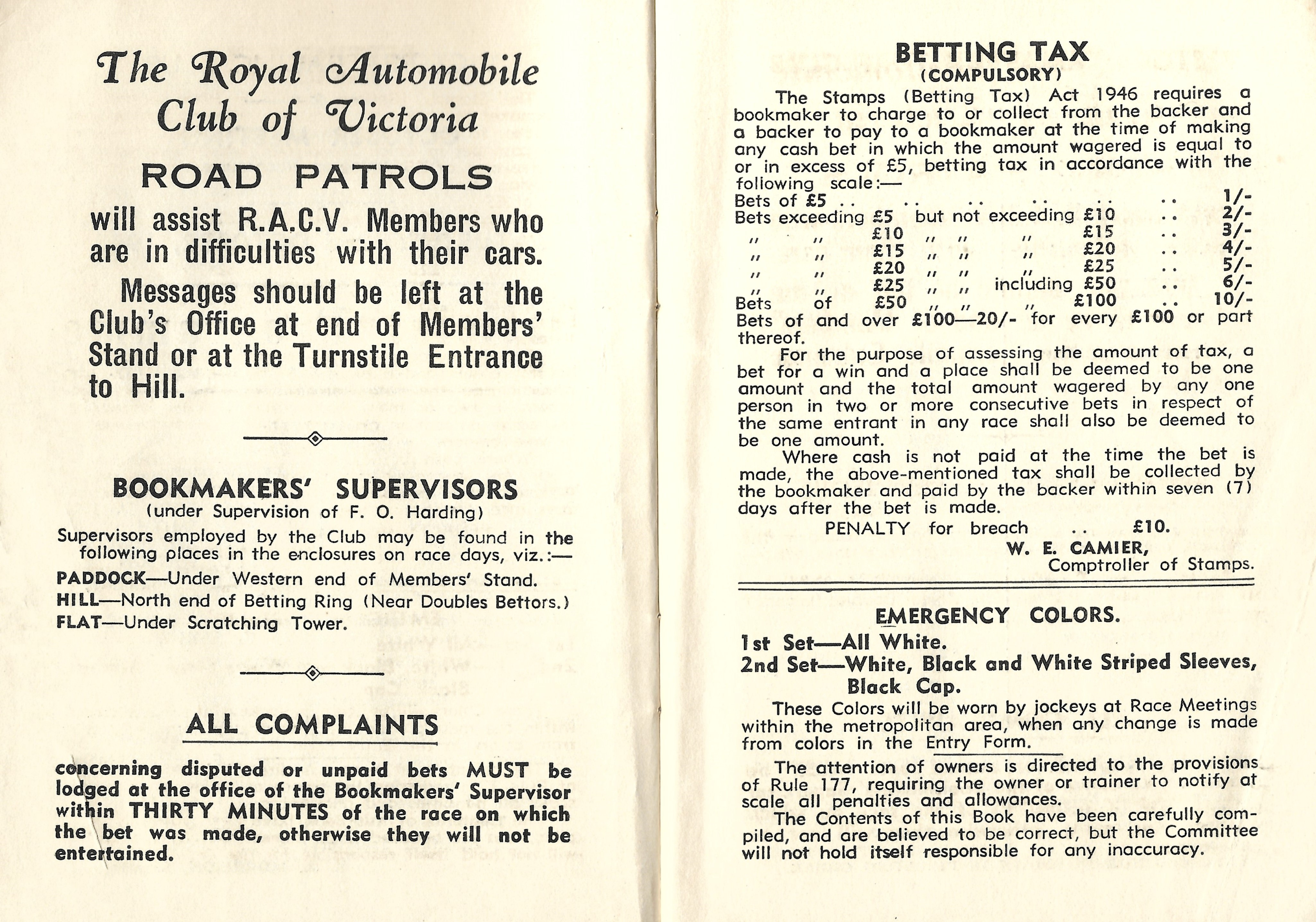
1948 VRC Turnbull Stakes raceday notices

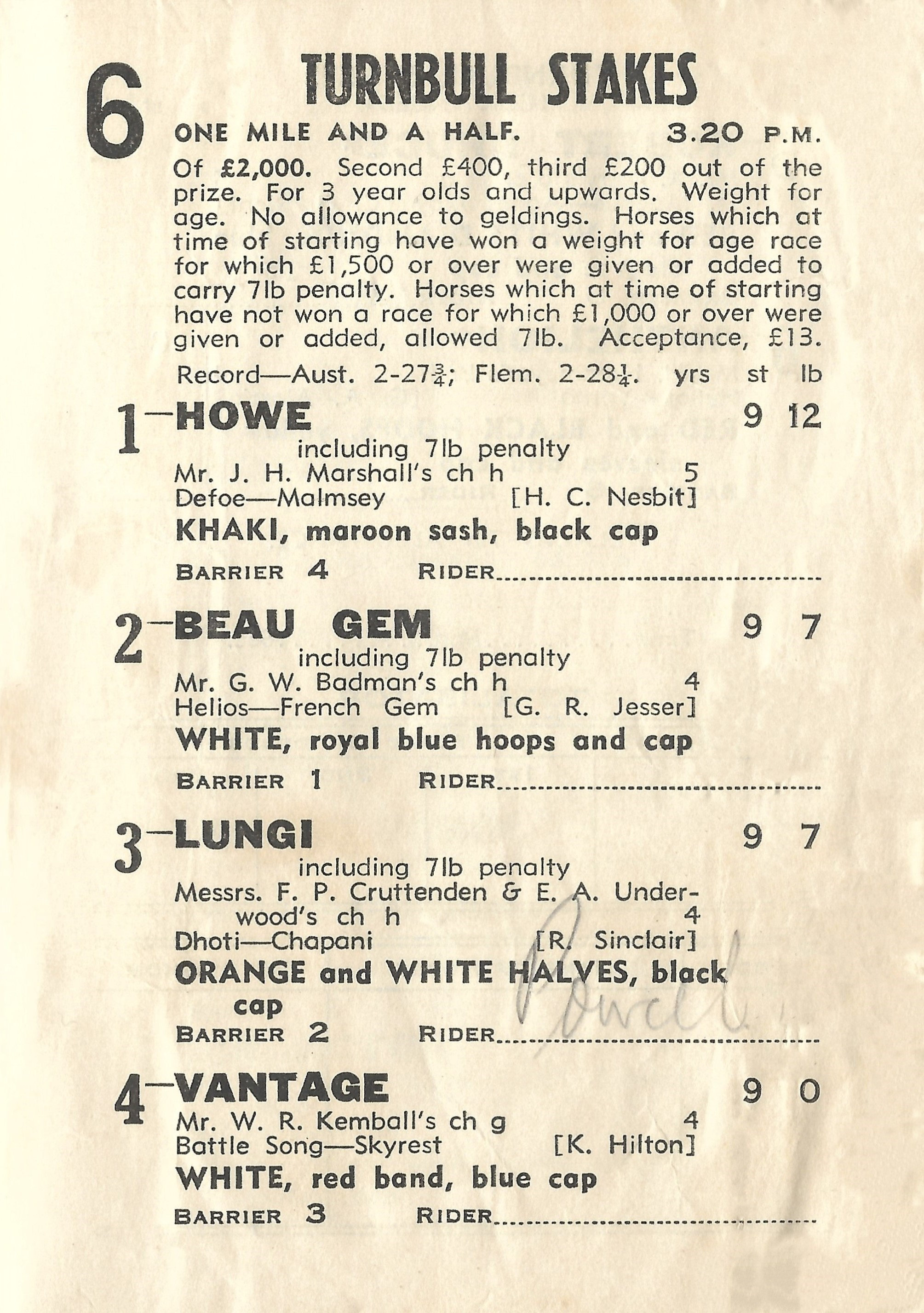
1948 VRC Turnbull Stakes showing the winner, Beau Gem

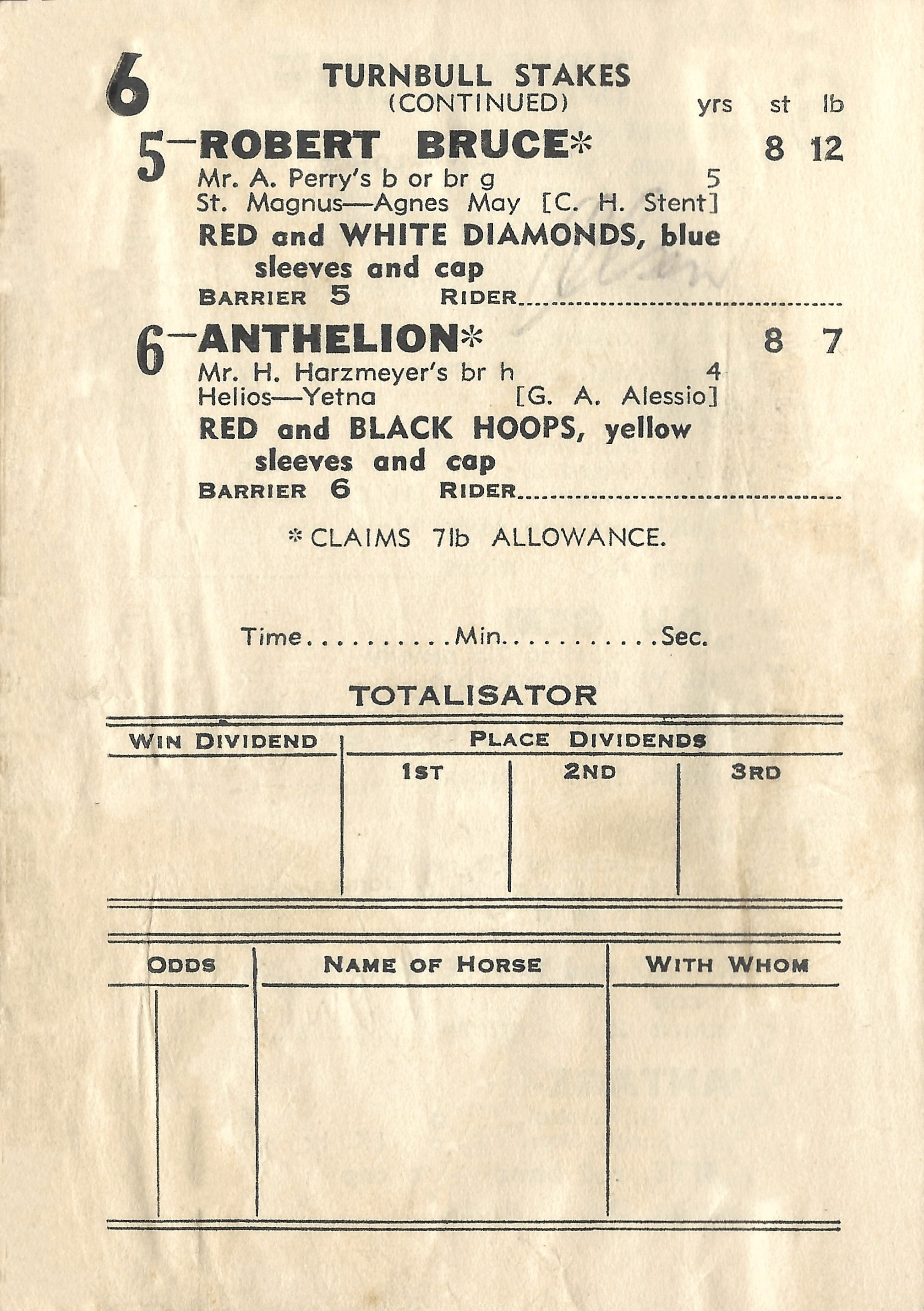
1948 VRC Turnbull Stakes starters and results

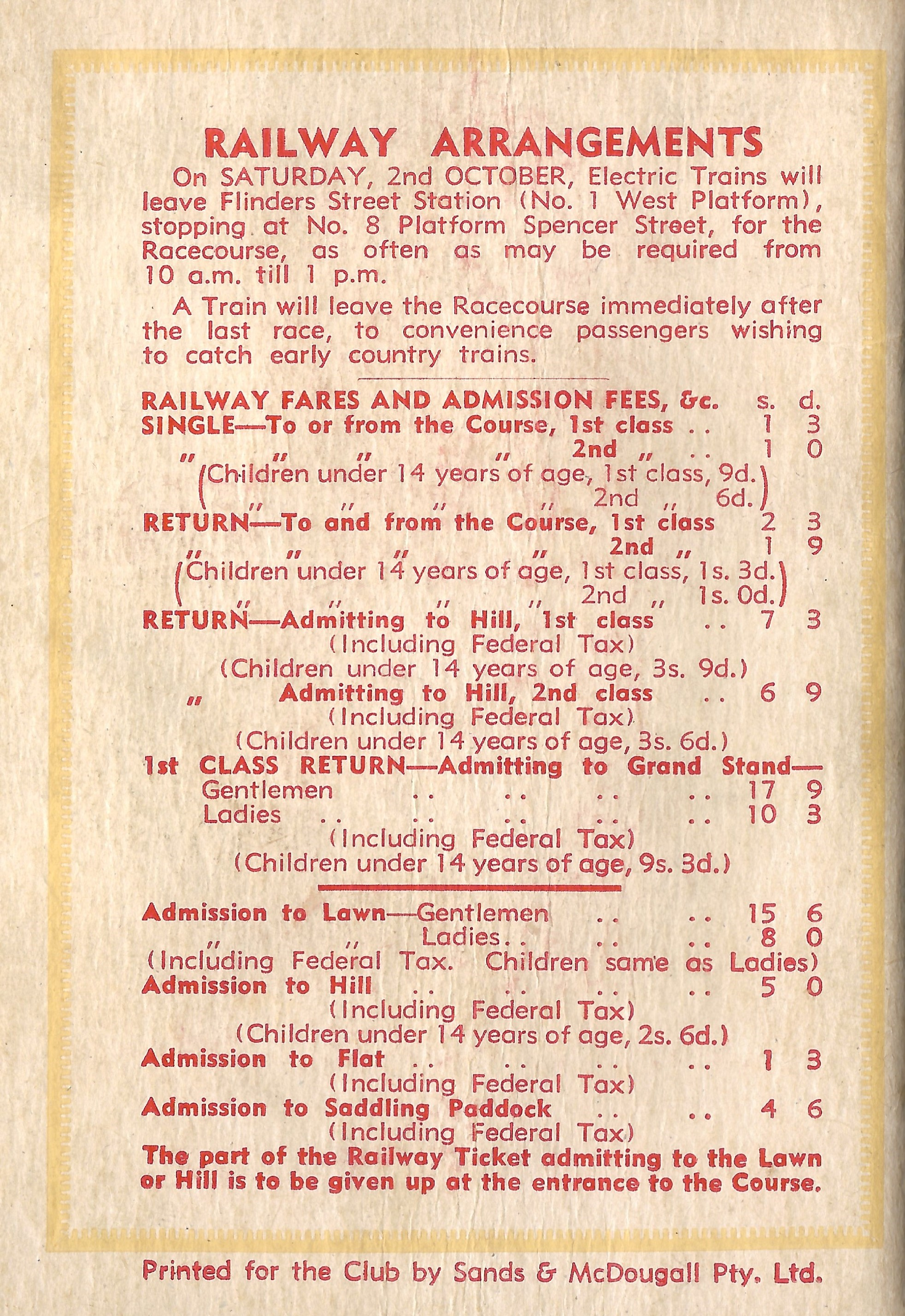
Back cover showing railway and admission charges

=== Gallery of noted winners ===
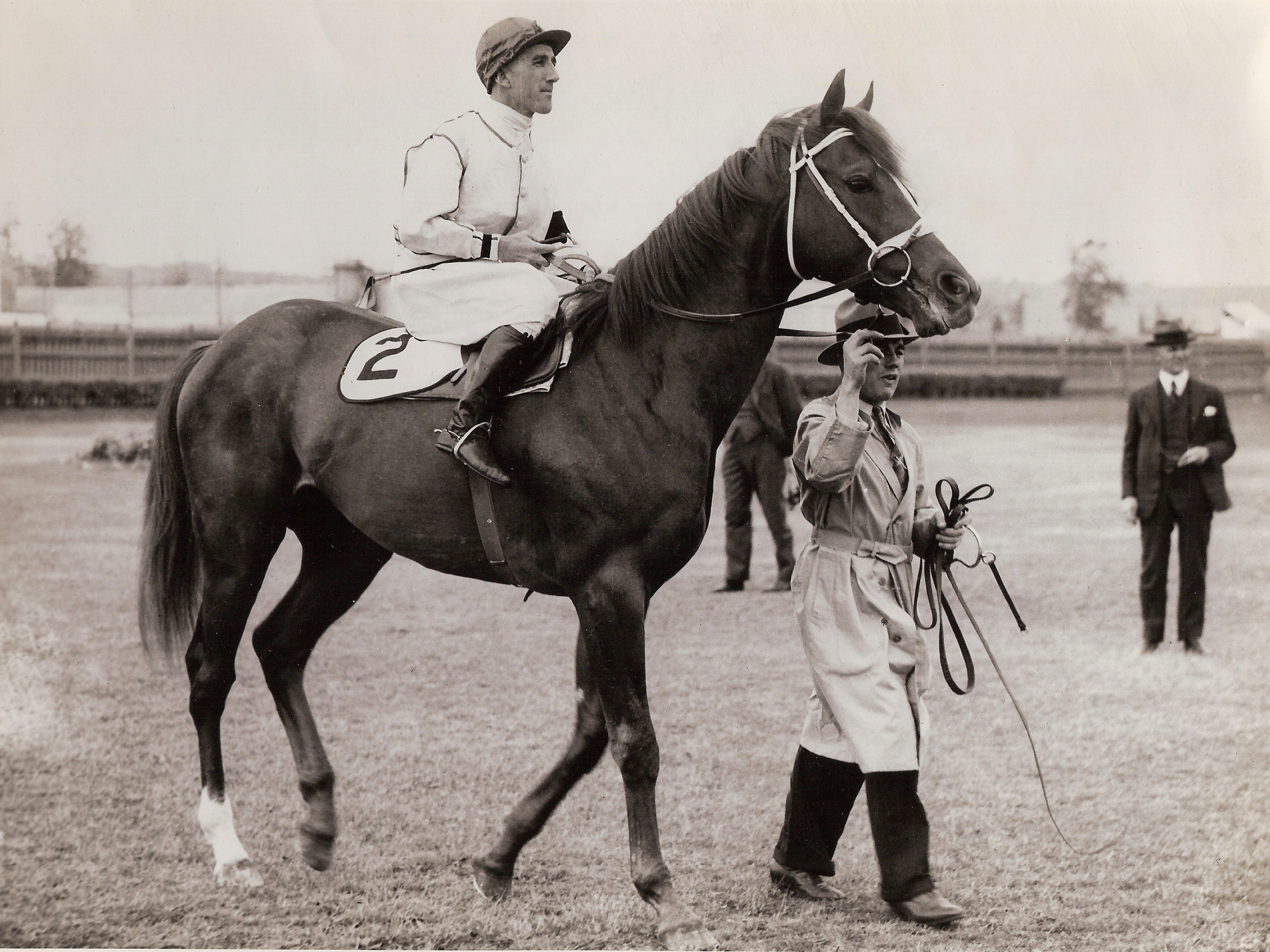
Ajax, 1938, 1940 winner

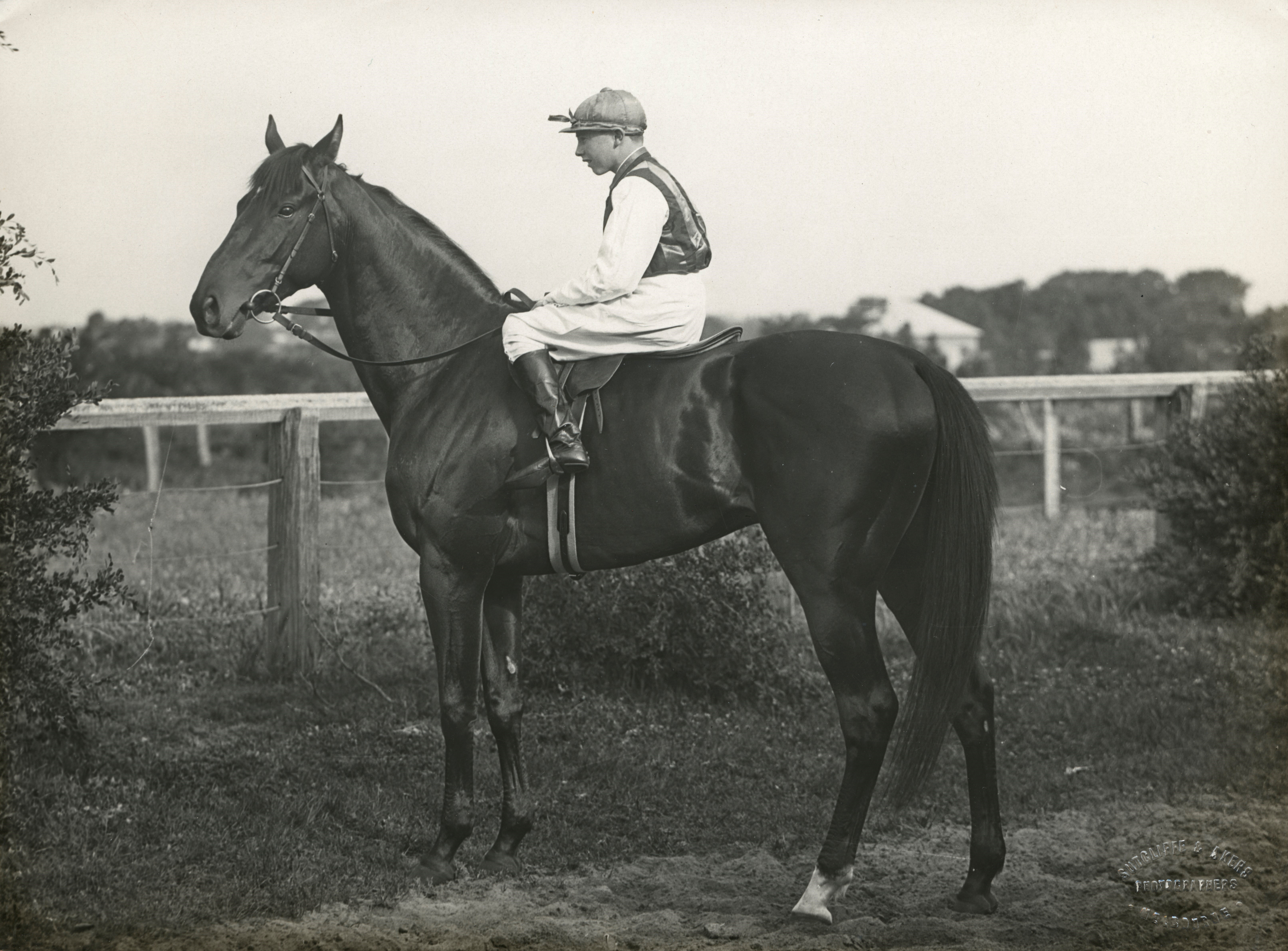
Lavendo, 1915 winner

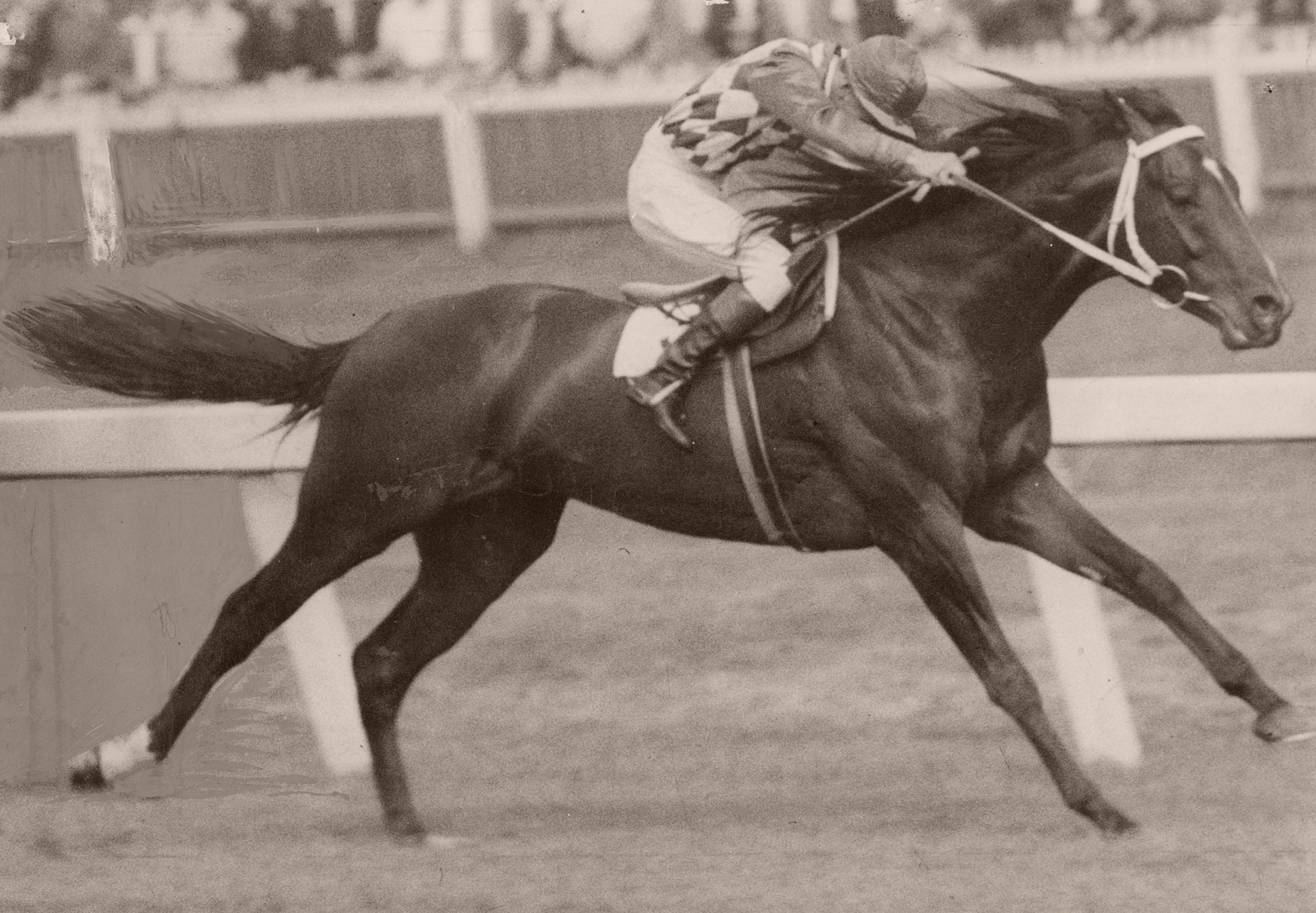
Comic Court, 1949 & 1950 winner

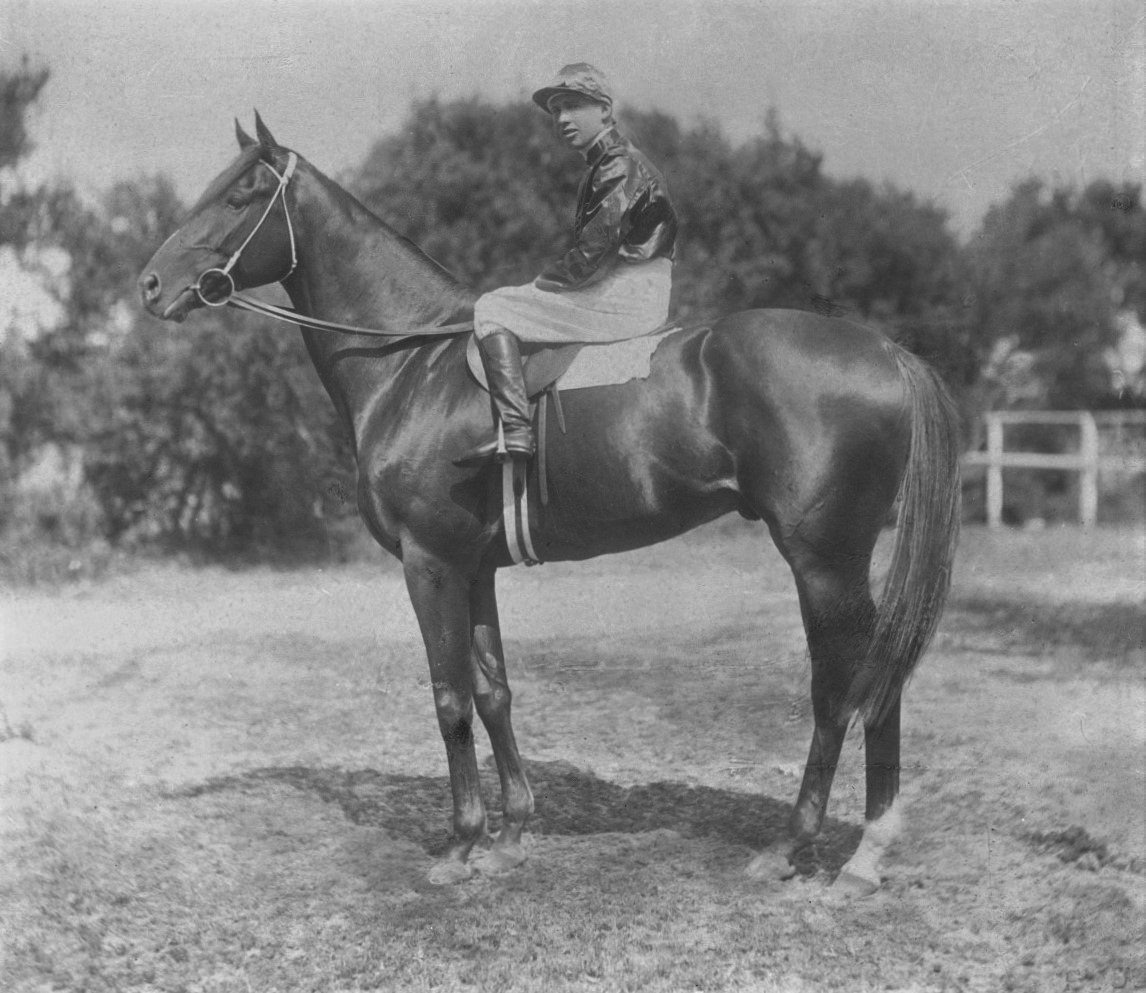
Eurythmic, 1920 winner

== Winners ==
The following are past winners of the race.

- 2026 - Cosmic Crusader
- 2025 - Sir Delius
- 2024 - Via Sistina
- 2023 - Gold Trip
- 2022 - Smokin' Romans
- 2021 - Incentivise
- 2020 - Verry Elleegant
- 2019 - Kings Will Dream
- 2018 - Winx
- 2017 - Winx
- 2016 - Hartnell
- 2015 - Preferment
- 2014 - Lucia Valentina
- 2013 - Happy Trails
- 2012 - Green Moon
- 2011 - December Draw
- 2010 - Zipping
- 2009 - Efficient
- 2008 - Littorio
- 2007 - Devil Moon
- 2006 - Sphenophyta
- 2005 - Makybe Diva
- 2004 - Elvstroem
- 2003 - Studebaker
- 2002 - Northerly
- 2001 - Sunline
- 2000 - Fairway
- 1999 - Sky Heights
- 1998 - Aerosmith
- 1997 - Marble Halls
- 1996 - Doriemus
- 1995 - All Our Mob
- 1994 - Redding
- 1993 - The Phantom Chance
- 1992 - Naturalism
- 1991 - Let's Elope
- 1990 - Better Loosen Up
- 1989 - Super Impose
- 1988 - Vo Rogue
- 1987 - Vo Rogue
- 1986 - Just Now
- 1985 - Lacka Reason
- 1984 - Al Dwain
- 1983 - Chez Nous
- 1982 - Birchwood
- 1981 - No Peer
- 1980 - Amarla
- 1979 - Dulcify
- 1978 - Lefroy
- 1977 - Salamander
- 1976 - Denise's Joy
- 1975 - Analight
- 1974 - Leilani
- 1973 - Australasia
- 1972 - Sharif
- 1971 - Igloo
- 1970 - Arctic Symbol
- 1969 - Fileur
- 1968 - Galilee
- 1967 - Star Belle
- 1966 - Tobin Bronze
- 1965 - Craftsman
- 1964 - Sir Dane
- 1963 - Sometime
- 1962 - Aquanita
- 1961 - Blue Lodge
- 1960 - Aircraft
- 1959 - Mac
- 1958 - Pandie Sun
- 1957 - Syntax
- 1956 - Pushover
- 1955 - Redcraze
- 1954 - Rising Fast
- 1953 - Petrograd
- 1952 - Aldershot
- 1951 - Morse Code
- 1950 - Comic Court
- 1949 - Comic Court
- 1948 - Beau Gem
- 1947 - Sea Monarch
- 1946 - Bernborough
- 1945 - Lawrence
- 1944 - Counsel
- 1943 - Amana
- 1942 - Great Britain
- 1941 - Panka
- 1940 - Ajax
- 1939 - Manrico
- 1938 - Ajax
- 1937 - John Wilkes
- 1936 - Prince Quex
- 1935 - Cardinal
- 1934 - Hall Mark
- 1933 - Middle Watch
- 1932 - Viol D'Amour
- 1931 - Viol D'Amour
- 1930 - Amounis
- 1929 - High Syce
- 1928 - Highland
- 1927 - Royal Charter
- 1926 - Manfred
- 1925 - Fujisan
- 1924 - Whittier
- 1923 - Whittier
- 1922 - Tangalooma
- 1921 - Tangalooma
- 1920 - Eurythmic
- 1919 - Night Watch
- 1918 - King Offa
- 1917 - Lanius
- 1916 - Greencap
- 1915 - Lavendo
- 1914 - Aleconner
- 1913 - Mountain Princess
- 1912 - Lady Medallist
- 1911 - Flavian
- 1910 - Captain White
- 1909 - Iolaire
- 1908 - Pink 'Un
- 1907 - Subterranean
- 1906 - Ellis
- 1905 - Gladsome
- 1904 - Gladsome
- 1903 - Wakeful
- 1902 - Strata Florida
- 1901 - Haymaker
- 1900 - Hautboy
- 1899 - Mora
- 1898 - Bobadil
- 1897 - Ayrshire
- 1896 - Resolute
- 1895 - Hova
- 1894 - Fortunatus
- 1893 - Vakeel
- 1892 - Donation
- 1891 - Marvel
- 1890 - Megaphone
- 1889 - Prince Consort
- 1888 - Mentor
- 1887 - Carlyon
- 1886 - Trenton
- 1885 - Trenton
- 1884 - David
- 1883 - Legrand
- 1882 - Darebin
- 1881 - Sweetmeat
- 1880 - Progress
- 1879 - First King
- 1878 - Warlock
- 1877 - Robinson Crusoe
- 1876 - Tocal
- 1875 - Robin Hood
- 1874 - Dagworth
- 1873 - Don Juan
- 1872 - King Of The Ring
- 1871 - Warrior
- 1870 - Tim Whiffler
- 1869 - Peeress
- 1868 - The Barb
- 1867 - Warwick
- 1866 - Volunteer
- 1865 - The Sign

== See also ==
- The Bart Cummings
- Danehill Stakes
- Edward Manifold Stakes
- Gilgai Stakes
- Rose of Kingston Stakes
- List of Australian Group races
- Group races
