= The Gold Rush (horse race) =

Horse race in Perth, Western Australia

- Class: Group 3
- Location: Ascot Racecourse
- Inaugurated: 1978
- Race type: Thoroughbred
- Sponsor: 7Plus Sport (2025)

Race information
- Distance: 1,400 metres
- Surface: Turf
- Track: Left-handed
- Qualification: Three year old and older
- Weight: Weight for age
- Purse: A$1,500,000 (2025)

The Gold Rush, formerly known as the A J Scahill Stakes, is a Perth Racing Group 3 Thoroughbred horse race held under Weight for Age conditions, for horses aged three years old and upwards, over a distance of 1,400 metres at Ascot Racecourse, Perth Western Australia in December.

== History ==
The race was named for Allan J. Scahill (1901–2000), who served on the Committee of the Western Australian Turf Club from 1953 to 1975 and was vice chairman in 1975. Scahill was also a founding member of the Western Australian Totalisator Agency Board.

In 2003 the race was run at Belmont Park Racecourse.

In 2022, the race was renamed The Gold Rush and the prize money increased to $1,500,000. In 2023, it was temporarily renamed the Damien Oliver Gold Rush, in honor of Australian jockey Damien Oliver, who announced his intention to retire after the 2023 Perth Racing Carnival. Oliver fittingly won the race in his final career start aboard Munhamek.

=== Distance ===
- 1978–1979 – 1200 metres
- 1980–1982 – 1400 metres
- 1983 – 1450 metres
- 1984 onwards - 1400 metres

=== Grade ===
- 1978 - Principal race
- 1979 onwards - Group 3

== Winners ==
The following are winners of the race.

- 2025 - Rey Magnerio
- 2024 - Western Empire
- 2023 - Munhamek
- 2022 - The Astrologist
- 2021 - Valour Road
- 2020 - Kementari
- 2019 - The Celt
- 2018 - Arcadia Prince
- 2017 - Silverstream
- 2016 - Vega Magic
- 2015 - Watermans Bay
- 2014 - Watermans Bay
- 2013 - Conservatorium
- 2012 - Power Princess
- 2011 - Grand Nirvana
- 2010 - Waratah's Secret
- 2009 - Proart
- 2008 - Takeover Target
- 2007 - Tarzi
- 2006 - Marasco
- 2005 - Arctic Park
- 2004 - Avenida Madero
- 2003 - Hot Shot Brother
- 2002 - Kensyl Bay
- 2001 - Lizzy Long Legs
- 2001 - Tribula
- 2000 - Terwilliger
- 1999 - Double Blue
- 1998 - Willoughby
- 1997 - Bold Extreme
- 1996 - Island Morn
- 1995 - Calypso
- 1994 - Brave Kite
- 1993 - Yilgangie Gold
- 1992 - Pago Escort
- 1991 - Strip The Moon
- 1990 - Medicine Kid
- 1989 - Westall
- 1988 - Miss Muffet
- 1987 - King Phoenix
- 1986 - Heron Bridge
- 1985 - Eastern Temple
- 1984 - Hanging In
- 1983 - Haulpak's Image

== See also ==
- List of Australian Group races
- Group races
