= Railway Stakes (Perth racing) =

Annual horse race in Perth, Western Australia

- Class: Group 1
- Location: Ascot Racecourse
- Inaugurated: 1887
- Race type: Thoroughbred
- Sponsor: Swan Draught (2026)

Race information
- Distance: 1,600 metres
- Surface: Turf
- Track: Left-handed
- Qualification: Horses three years old and older
- Weight: handicap
- Purse: A$1,500,000 (2026)

The Railway Stakes is an Australian Group 1 Thoroughbred horse race under handicap race conditions over a distance of 1600 metres at Ascot Racecourse in Perth in late November.

== History ==
The inaugural running of the event was held on Perth Cup day in 1887 with stakes of 60 sovereigns when the three-year-old Nimrod won the event over Hermit. The following season the race was held on New Year's Day 1889 and in the renewal of the race Hermit won the race while Nimrod finished third. The event continued to be part of the Western Australian Turf Club's Summer Carnival, with the race being scheduled on the same day as the Perth Cup. In 2001 the WATC rescheduled the event to late November. From 2011 to 2015 the race date was considered the richest day in thoroughbred racing in Perth, known as Super Saturday, with the Winterbottom Stakes, WA Guineas and several other Listed races. The Winterbottom Stakes was moved to the following Saturday in 2016. In 2003 the race was held at Belmont Park Racecourse.

Western Australian owner-breeder Bob Peters has had seven winners in the Railway Stakes:

- Old Comrade (2001)
- Elite Belle (2014)
- Galaxy Star (2018)
- Regal Power (2019)
- Inspirational Girl (2020)
- Western Empire (2021)
- Cosmic Crusader (2026)

=== 1930 racebook ===
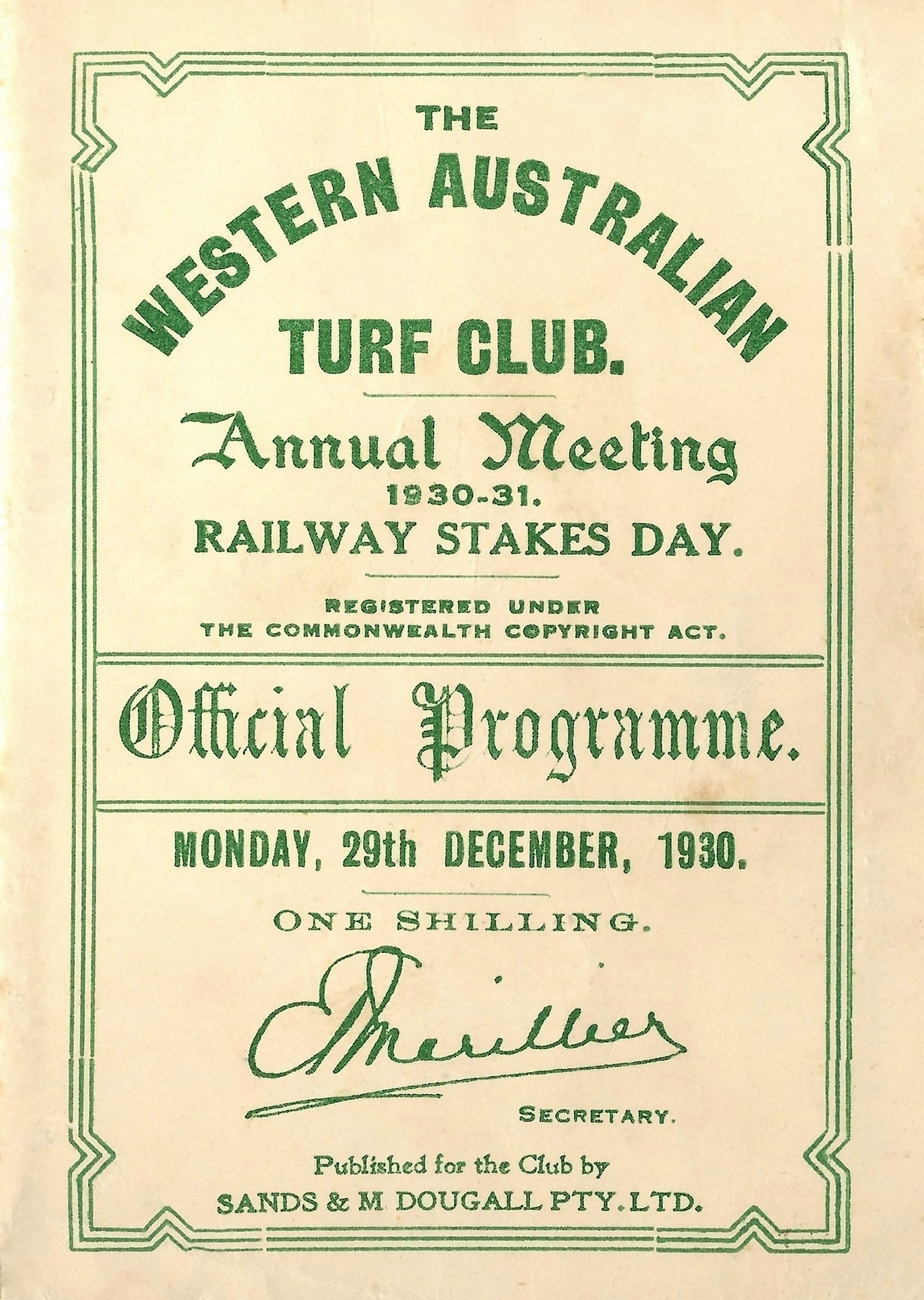
1930 WATC Railway Stakes racebook front cover

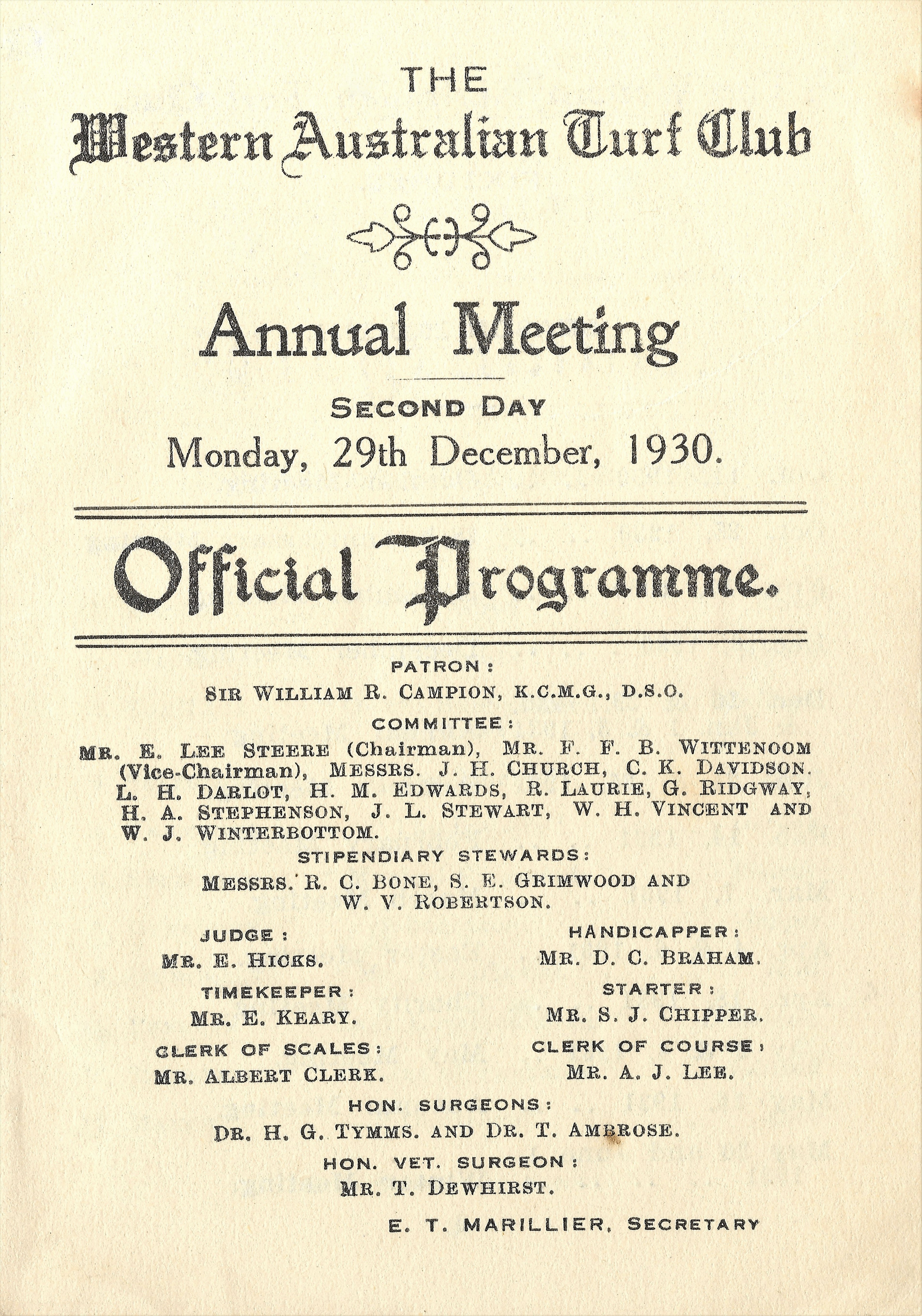
1930 WATC Railway Stakes showing raceday officials

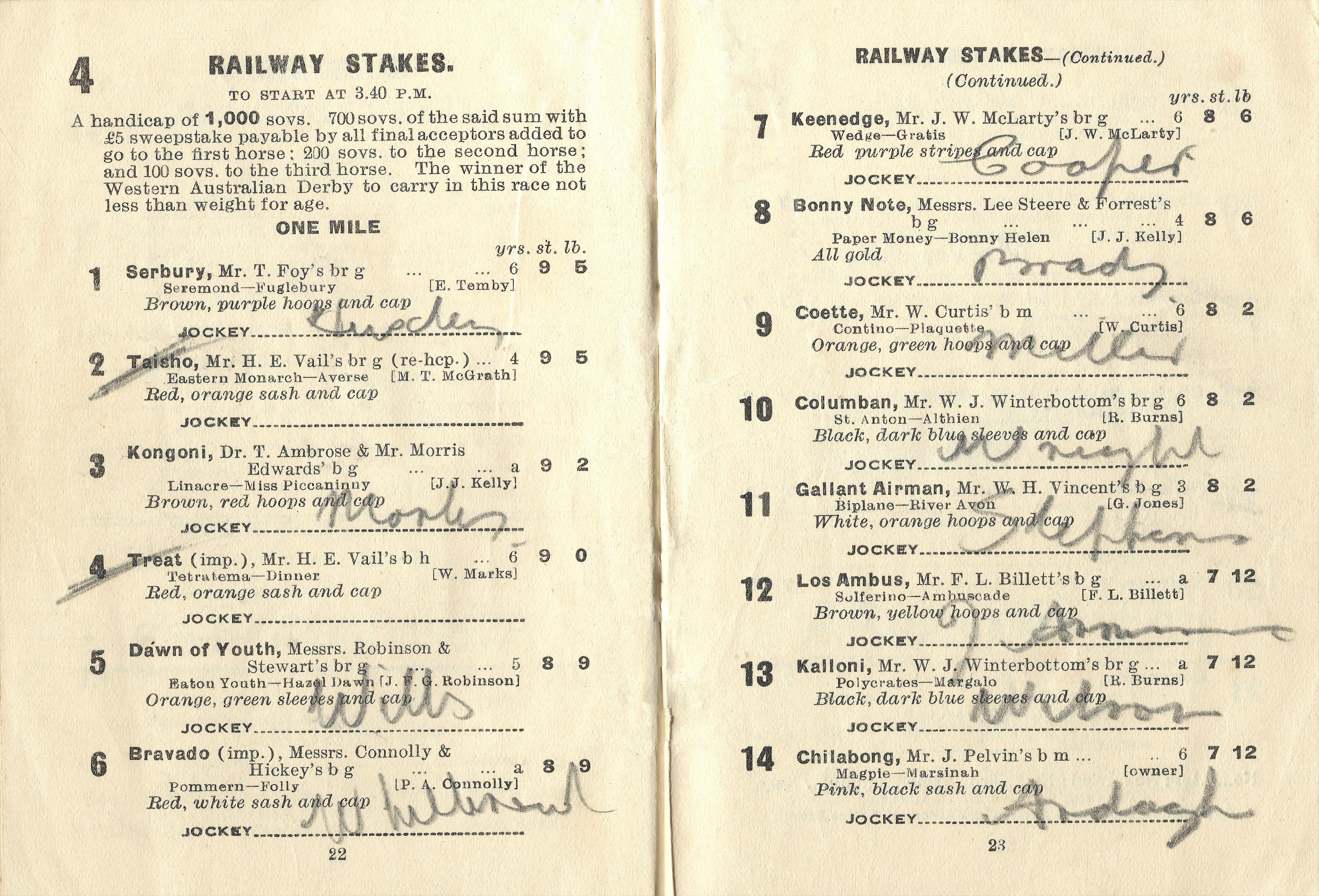
1930 WATC Railway Stakes starters and results showing the winner, Coette

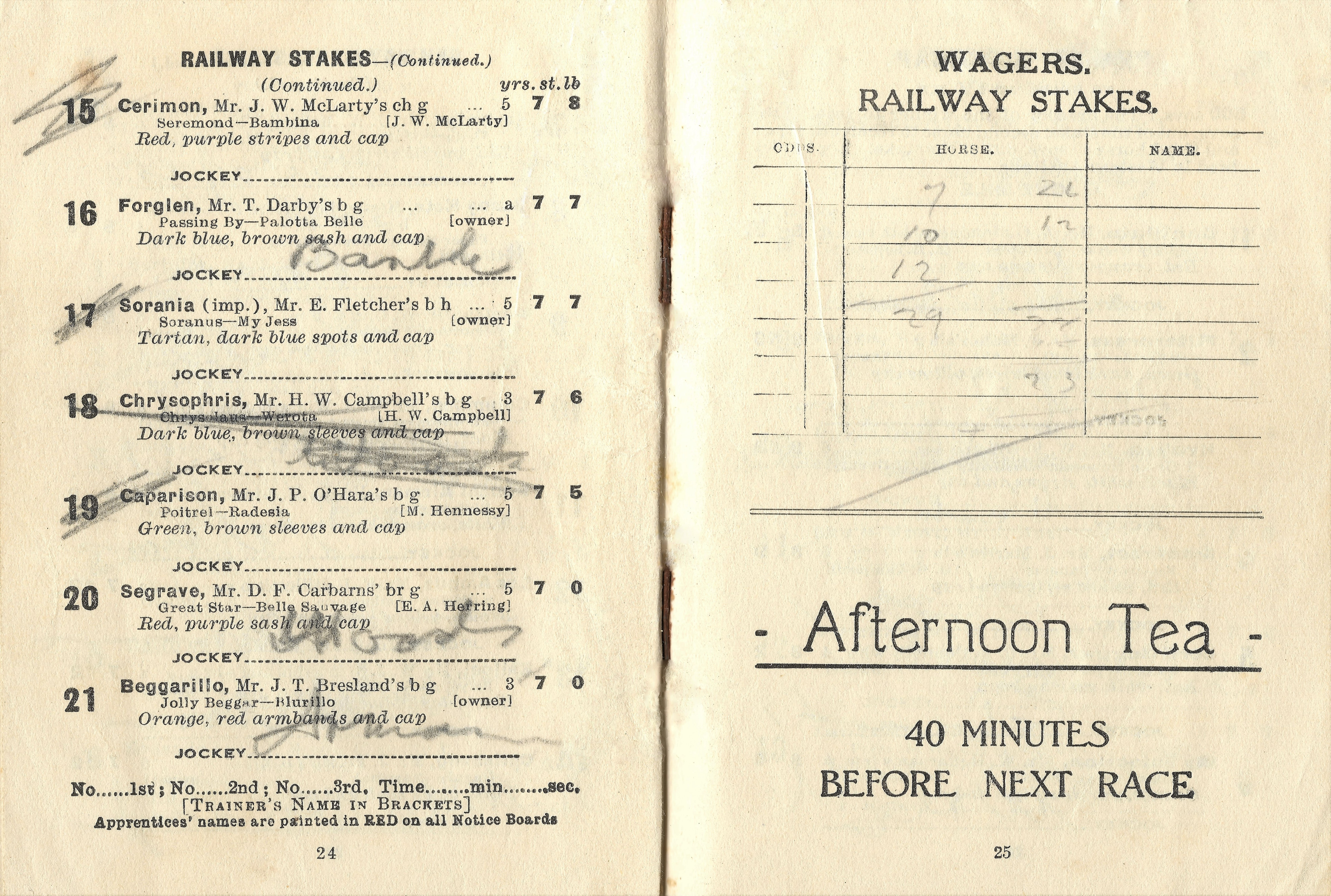
1930 WATC Railway Stakes starters and results

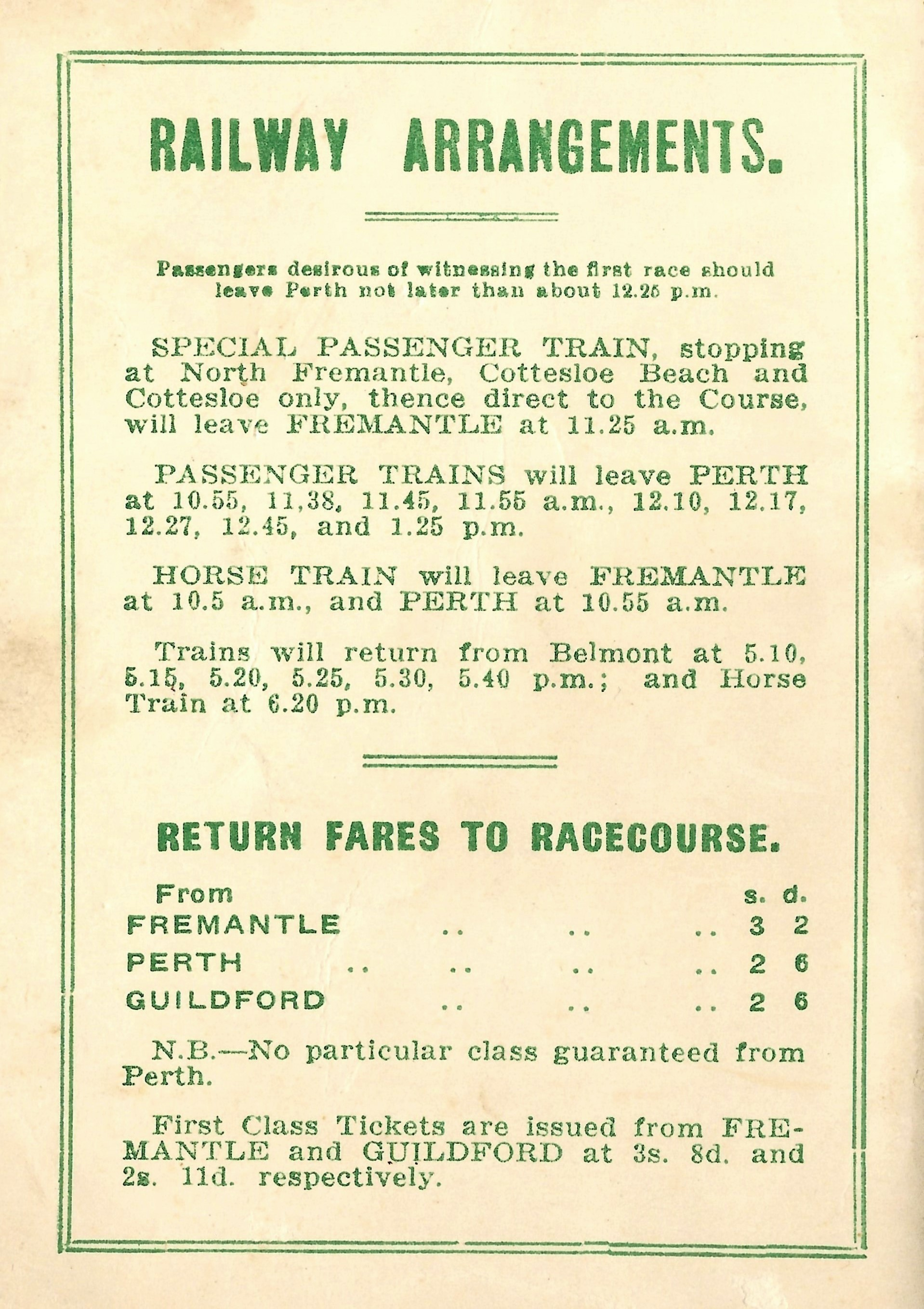
Back cover showing railway arrangements

=== Distance ===
- 1887–1925 - 1 1/4 miles (~2000 metres)
- 1926–1971 - 1 mile (~1609 metres)
- 1972–1983 – 1500 metres (~9/10 mile)
- 1984 onwards - 1600 metres (~1 mile)

=== Grade ===
- 1887–1978 - Principal race
- 1979 onwards - Group 1

=== Double winners ===
Only two horses have won it twice:

- Tudor Mak (1966 and 1967) and Luckygray (2011 and 2013)

Thoroughbreds that have won the Railway Stakes – Kingston Town Classic double:

- Better Loosen Up (1989), Old Comrade (2001), Modem (2004), Sniper's Bullet (2009)

== Winners ==
The following are past winners of the race.

- 2026 - Cosmic Crusader
- 2025 - Watch Me Rock
- 2024 - Port Lockroy
- 2023 - Bustler
- 2022 - Trix of the Trade
- 2021 - Western Empire
- 2020 - Inspirational Girl
- 2019 - Regal Power
- 2018 - Galaxy Star
- 2017 - Great Shot
- 2016 - Scales Of Justice
- 2015 - Good Project
- 2014 - Elite Belle
- 2013 - Luckygray
- 2012 - Mr Moet
- 2011 - Luckygray (Note: In 2011 He's Remarkable crossed the finish line first, but was relegated to second place on protest due to interference.)
- 2010 - Gathering
- 2009 - Sniper's Bullet
- 2008 - Gilded Venom
- 2007 - El Presidente
- 2006 - Belle Bizarre
- 2005 - Covertly
- 2004 - Modem
- 2003 - Hardrada
- 2002 - Old Fashion
- 2001 - Old Comrade
- 2000 - Northerly
- 1999 - Slavonic
- 1998 (Dec.) - Machine Gun Tom
- 1998 (Jan.) - Willoughby
- 1996 - Bold Extreme
- 1995 - Jacks Or Better
- 1994 (Dec.) - Zaparri
- 1994 (Jan.) - Island Morn
- 1992 - Welcome Knight
- 1991 - M'Lady's Jewel
- 1990 - Medicine Kid
- 1989 - Better Loosen Up
- 1988 - Marwong
- 1987 (Dec.) - Jungle Dawn
- 1987 (Jan.) - Miss Muffet
- 1985 - Valley Of Carome
- 1984 - Eastern Temple
- 1983 (Dec.) - Getting Closer
- 1983 (Jan.) - Sanatate
- 1981 - Iko
- 1980 - Golden Heights
- 1979 - Asian Beau
- 1978 - Sarsha's Choice
- 1977 (Dec.) - Marjoleo
- 1977 (Jan.) - Alpine Wind
- 1975 - Detonator
- 1974 - Cambana Lad
- 1973 - Starglow
- 1972 - Millefleurs
- 1971 - Royal Spring
- 1970 - Kilrickle
- 1969 - Gold Casket
- 1968 - La Trice
- 1967 - Tudor Mak
- 1966 - Tudor Mak
- 1965 - Blue Spring
- 1964 - Sweet Saga
- 1963 - Yenton
- 1962 - Royal Thrust
- 1961 - Big Bob
- 1960 - Westmaster
- 1959 - Aquanita
- 1958 - On Guard
- 1957 - Young Filipino
- 1956 - El Boom
- 1955 - Cunderdin
- 1954 - Maniana
- 1953 - Earl James
- 1952 - Aptofine
- 1951 - Beau Temps
- 1950 - Chieftain Warrior
- 1949 - Tania
- 1948 - Gold Patois
- 1947 - Sorcery
- 1946 - Thorium
- 1945 - Falsetto
- 1944 - Bobby Breen
- 1943 - Beaufine
- 1942 - Flame Lady
- 1941 - Hinda
- 1940 - Pretoria
- 1939 - Winbyie
- 1938 - Tetreen
- 1937 - Temple Coyn
- 1936 - Gay Gipsy
- 1935 - Desert Hero
- 1934 - Aclis
- 1933 - Earl Cunje
- 1932 - Jolly Fair
- 1931 - Comprador
- 1930 - Coette
- 1929 - Hint
- 1928 - Columban
- 1927 - Jolly Odd
- 1926 - Cunningman
- 1925 - Eupator
- 1924 - Borgia
- 1923 - Jolly Handsome
- 1922 - Sweet Doris
- 1921 - Fair Intervener
- 1920 (Dec.) - Bobaris
- 1920 (Jan.) - Andronicus
- 1919 - Acclivity
- 1917 - Quiara
- 1916 (Dec.) - Minever
- 1916 (Jan.) - Simple Maid
- 1914 (Dec.) - Lilyveil
- 1914 (Jan.) - Werenda
- 1912 - Saturate
- 1911 - Apple Charlotte
- 1910 (Dec.) - Artesian
- 1910 (Jan.) - Thigen Thu
- 1908 - Lady Agnes
- 1907 (Dec.) - Betsy Burke
- 1907 (Jan.) - Man O' War
- 1905 - Scorher
- 1904 - Possum
- 1903 (Dec.) - Display
- 1903 (Jan.) - Meteorite
- 1901 (Dec.) - Limber
- 1901 (Jan.) - Australian
- 1900 - First Mate
- 1899 - Yatheroo
- 1898 - Onslow
- 1897 - Primrose
- 1896 - Dryden
- 1895 - Florrie
- 1894 - Carbine
- 1893 - Lockeville
- 1892 - Lord Byron
- 1891 - Will O' The Wisp
- 1890 - Wandering Willie
- 1889 - Hermit
- 1887 - Nimrod

== See also ==
- Asian Beau Stakes
- Prince of Wales Stakes
- Ted Van Heemst Stakes
- List of Australian Group races
