= Mr Quickie =

Australian thoroughbred racehorse

- Sire: Shamus Award
- Grandsire: Snitzel
- Dam: Special Favour
- Damsire: General Nediym
- Sex: Gelding
- Foaled: 10 August 2015
- Country: Australia
- Colour: Bay or Brown
- Breeder: Rosemont Stud
- Owner: Wylie Dalziel Roy Higgins Racing et al.
- Trainer: Darren Weir (2018); Phillip Stokes (2019 onwards)
- Record: 30: 11-6-3
- Earnings: A$2,101,300

Major wins
- Queensland Derby (2019); Toorak Handicap (2020); Victoria Handicap (2021)

Mr Quickie (foaled 10 August 2015) is a retired multiple Group 1 winning Australian bred thoroughbred racehorse.

== Background ==
Mr Quickie was a A$115,000 Magic Millions purchase for Dalziel Racing from the Rosemont Stud draft. Rosemont Stud remained in the ownership and also stand his sire Shamus Award.

== Racing career ==
Un-raced as a two-year-old, Mr Quickie made his debut on the 25 September 2018 at Murtoa Racecourse, where he finished in second placing.

Mr Quickie then proceeded to win 9 of his next 12 starts, which culminated on 8 June 2019 with his first Group One victory at Eagle Farm in the Queensland Derby. He was backed in from $5.50 to start a $2.80 favourite. He defeated Vow And Declare by just under a length who would later go on that year to win the Melbourne Cup. Mr Quickie had to survive a protest from jockey Damien Oliver on board Vow And Declare, however this was dismissed by stewards.

Mr Quickie's next victory was his second Group One on 10 October 2020 in the Toorak Handicap at Caulfield. Ridden by Jamie Kah, Mr Quickie was a two-length winner at odds of 20/1.

Mr Quickie was retired from racing after suffering a hip injury in 2021.

== Pedigree ==
Pedigree of Mr Quickie (AUS) 2015
Sire Shamus Award (AUS) 2010	Snitzel (AUS); 2002	Redoute's Choice	Danehill
Sire Shamus Award (AUS) 2010	Snitzel (AUS); 2002	Redoute's Choice	Shantha's Choice
Sire Shamus Award (AUS) 2010	Snitzel (AUS); 2002	Snippets' Lass	Snippets
Sire Shamus Award (AUS) 2010	Snitzel (AUS); 2002	Snippets' Lass	Snow Finch
Sire Shamus Award (AUS) 2010	Sunset Express (AUS); 1999	Success Express	Hold Your Peace
Sire Shamus Award (AUS) 2010	Sunset Express (AUS); 1999	Success Express	Au Printemps
Sire Shamus Award (AUS) 2010	Sunset Express (AUS); 1999	Finito Fling	Luskin Star
Sire Shamus Award (AUS) 2010	Sunset Express (AUS); 1999	Finito Fling	From the Wood
Dam Special Favour (AUS) 2009	General Nediym (AUS); 1994	Nediym	Shareef Dancer
Dam Special Favour (AUS) 2009	General Nediym (AUS); 1994	Nediym	Nilmeen
Dam Special Favour (AUS) 2009	General Nediym (AUS); 1994	Military Belle	Without Fear
Dam Special Favour (AUS) 2009	General Nediym (AUS); 1994	Military Belle	Reticella
Dam Special Favour (AUS) 2009	Tusker (NZ); 2001	Volksraad	Green Desert
Dam Special Favour (AUS) 2009	Tusker (NZ); 2001	Volksraad	Celtic Assembly
Dam Special Favour (AUS) 2009	Tusker (NZ); 2001	Stella Artois	Star Way
Dam Special Favour (AUS) 2009	Tusker (NZ); 2001	Stella Artois	Horlicks
