= Verry Elleegant =

New Zealand-bred thoroughbred racehorse (2015–2024)

- Sire: Zed
- Grandsire: Zabeel
- Dam: Opulence
- Damsire: Danroad
- Sex: Female
- Foaled: 12 October 2015
- Died: 18 February 2024 (aged 8)
- Country: New Zealand
- Colour: Bay
- Breeder: JD Goodwin
- Owner: Jomara Bloodstock Ltd et al.
- Trainer: Nicholas Bishara (2018); Darren Weir (2018); Chris Waller (2019–2022); Francis-Henri Graffard (2022 onwards)
- Record: 36: 16–7–3
- Earnings: A$ 14,643,244

Major wins
- Ethereal Stakes (2018); Phar Lap Stakes (2019); Vinery Stud Stakes (2019); Australian Oaks (2019); Hill Stakes (2019); Tancred Stakes (2020); Winx Stakes (2020); Turnbull Stakes (2020); Caulfield Cup (2020); Chipping Norton Stakes (2021, 2022); Ranvet Stakes (2021); George Main Stakes (2021); Melbourne Cup (2021)

Awards
- Australian Racehorse of the Year (2020/21); Australian Champion Stayer (2020/21), (2021/22); Australian Champion Middle Distance Racehorse (2020/21)

Verry Elleegant (12 October 2015 – 18 February 2024) was a New Zealand-bred Australian-trained Thoroughbred racehorse that won 11 Group One races. She was crowned the 2020/2021 Australian Racehorse of the Year and was the winner of the 2021 Melbourne Cup and 2020 Caulfield Cup.

== Background ==
Verry Elleegant was out of the New Zealand race mare Opulence, which was owned by her initial trainer, Nick Bishara. After Opulence won two races she was sold at the 2011 Mixed Sale at Karaka to Don Goodwin, who is the owner of Verry Elleegant's sire, Zed. The horse was named after Goodwin's granddaughter Ellee. Previously, he had named her brother "Verry Flash", adopting the "verry" spelling to be distinctive. Both Bishara and Goodwin struck up a friendship and raced Verry Elleegant until she was sold to clients of Australian trainer Darren Weir.

== Racing career ==
=== 2017/18: two-year-old season ===
Verry Elleegant made her racing debut on 7 July 2018. She finished second at Te Rapa Racecourse in New Zealand, ridden by Rowena Smyth in the Majestic Horse Floats Plate.

=== 2018/19: three-year-old season ===
One month after her debut run, Verry Elleegant won her first race, a maiden, in convincing style at Ruakaka when ridden by Rowena Smyth. After producing a last to first victory, Smyth said after the race, "That was awesome the way she picked them up and flew past them. She just took off. Once she gets over a trip when she is older she is going to be a lovely filly."

After back-to-back wins with a further dominant victory at Matamata Racecourse in a benchmark 65 race, Verry Elleegant was sold and transferred to Australian trainer, Darren Weir, with the intention of the horse participating in the forthcoming Spring Racing Carnival. Darren Weir's Australian clients purchased a fifty per cent share of the horse, with Jomara Bloodstock and the original ownership group retaining a 25 per cent share.

At her Australian debut, Verry Elleegant ran a luckless third placing in the Edward Manifold Stakes. Former trainer and part owner Nick Bishara said after the race, "It's a pity she didn't win, but still it was a top run and it showed she is up to the class over there." Despite the third placing, Verry Elleegant firmed into favouritism for the Group 1 VRC Oaks.

In what is considered a lead up to the Oaks, Verry Elleegant ran in the Ethereal Stakes. She raced fiercely in the early stages of the 2000-metre race, but rider John Allen settled her into a midfield position. Allen angled her out into clear space in the straight, and she stretched out to win by half a length.

Verry Elleegant finished unplaced in her next two starts, the Wakeful Stakes and the VRC Oaks. Following these runs she was removed from the stables of trainer Darren Weir, due to Police charging him with animal cruelty offences and conspiracy to defraud. She was transferred to the Sydney stables of trainer Chris Waller.

After a 3-month break Verry Elleegant was successful in two Group 1 races in succession, the Vinery Stud Stakes and the Australian Oaks. After her win in the Oaks trainer Waller said, "That was a brilliant win. She's a very exceptional filly and I think the best is yet to come."

=== 2019/20: four-year-old season ===
Verry Elleegant returned to racing on 24 August 2019 however finished unplaced in the Winx Stakes. She then finished unplaced at her next start behind Avilius in the George Main Stakes. On 5 October she was a last stride winner in the Hill Stakes. She then contested the 2019 Cox Plate at the odds of 20/1, however was beaten some 10 lengths by Japanese horse Lys Gracieux. Jockey James McDonald said after the race, "It's probably a year too soon for her. She just doesn't execute well enough for a Cox Plate."

After a four month break, Verry Elleegant resumed racing on 15 February 2020 and was a fast finishing fourth behind Alizee in the Apollo Stakes. Two second placings followed in the Chipping Norton Stakes and the Ranvet Stakes before she won her third Group 1 race in the Tancred Stakes.

=== 2020/21: five-year-old season ===
On 22 August 2020, Verry Elleegant returned to racing after a four month break in the Winx Stakes at Randwick. Starting the fourth favourite at odds of $7.50, she sat wide throughout the run and after hitting the front in the straight she was then clearly headed by stablemate Star Of The Seas. However under vigorous riding from jockey James McDonald, Verry Elleegant fought back to win the race by a narrow margin and captured her fourth Group 1 race.

On 19 September 2020, Verry Elleegant started the $2.20 favourite in the George Main Stakes at Randwick. She got back in the small field of only seven runners before jockey James McDonald went for a tight run in the straight, however he was forced back onto the fence by the Godolphin raced Oaks winner Colette. Eventually Verry Elleegant finished unplaced in fourth position but only beaten by just over a length margin by stable mate Kolding.

On 3 October 2020, Verry Elleegant had her next race in the Turnbull Stakes at Flemington. Starting as the $5 favourite she won the race in a close finish with only one length separating the first six placings. This proved to be her fifth victory at Group 1 level. Trainer Chris Waller who trained the first three runners past the post said after the race, "She's (Verry Elleegant) tough, she's back on track and looking forward to the Caulfield Cup".

On October 17, Verry Elleegant started the $5 favourite in the Caulfield Cup. Ridden by Mark Zahra, she settled in the second half of the field throughout, before making her move 600 metres from the finish line. After hitting the front in the home straight, she went head-to-head with Irish horse Anthony Van Dyck who drew level with her, however Verry Elleegant produced a late effort to win by a margin of a short neck.

On November 3, Verry Elleegant attempted to achieve the historic Caulfield Cup/Melbourne Cup double, but she finished seventh in the 2020 Melbourne Cup to Twilight Payment. She started from barrier 15 and carried 55.5 kg and was beaten just under 4 lengths.

On 13 February 2021 Verry Elleegant resumed racing in the Apollo Stakes at Randwick over 1,400 metres. Starting the $2.50 favourite she finished in third placing, beaten just over 2 lengths by the Godolphin mare Colette.

On 27 February she was successful in her seventh Group 1 race when defeating the Godolphin horses Colette and Avilius in the Chipping Norton Stakes.

On 27 February she defeated Addeybb in the Ranvet Stakes. Trainer Chris Waller described her after the race as being, "world-class".

=== 2021/22: six-year-old season ===
Verry Elleegant returned to racing after a 3 1/2-month spell on 21 August 2021 in the Winx Stakes at Randwick. She started favourite at $4.20, but finished second by a quarter of a length to Mo'unga.

On 18 September she ran in the Group 1 George Main Stakes at Randwick. She started odds on favourite at $1.75 and won by a three-quarter length over Riodini.

On 2 October, she returned to defend her Turnbull Stakes victory the year prior at Flemington. She started as favourite at $2.10, ahead of Incentivise at $2.70. She jumped well, settling two out from the rail in fourth. She maintained this position until 500 m to go, where she drew alongside the leaders four from the rail. She held here before being dropped at the 150 m, eventually finishing 4th behind Incentivise, Young Werther and Chapada, three and a half lengths shy of the winner.

Verry Elleegant was placed third in the Cox Plate behind State Of Rest and Anamoe.

On 2 November she won the 2021 Melbourne Cup, ridden by James McDonald, ahead of Incentivise and Spanish Mission. It was the first Melbourne Cup victory for both trainer Chris Waller and jockey James McDonald.

=== 2022/23: seven-year-old season ===
In May 2022, Verry Elleegant was transferred to the Chantilly, France stable of Francis-Henri Graffard to build up for an attempt at the prestigious Prix de l'Arc de Triomphe at Longchamp Racecourse in October 2022 but was excluded from the race due to various conditions.

After a disappointing campaign in France and at Ascot, Verry Elleegant was retired.

== Death ==
Verry Elleegant died due to complications whilst in foal on 18 February 2024, at the age of 8. Her foal also died.

== Racing summary ==
The following are some of Verry Elleegant's races.

Date	Age	Race	Class	Distance	Track	Field	Finish	Winning Time	Going	Odds (Note: In Australian charts, the odds show the total amount payable for each dollar wagered on a winning bet. For example, a bet of $10 at odds of 2.0 in Australia would pay $20.00. In North America and Europe, the odds reflect that a winning bet will return the original stake as well. For example, a bet of $10 at odds of 2-1 in the United States would pay $30.00. In the United States, a bet that pays a total of $20 for a $10 bet would have odds of 1-1 (even money))	Margin	Jockey
7 Jul 2018	2	Majestic Horse Floats Plate	Open	1200m	Te Rapa	7	2	1:13.28	Slow	27.30	(2.8 lengths)	Rowena Smyth
12 Aug 2018	3	Nzb Insurance Pearl Series Mdn	Maiden	1400m	Ruakaka	12	1	1:25.98	Dead	3.20	2.5 lengths	R Smyth
12 Sep 2018	3	Nzb Insurance Pearl Series (Bm65)	BM65	1400m	Matamata	8	1	1:25.73	Slow	2.00	2.3 lengths	R Smyth
6 Oct 2018	3	Edward Manifold Stakes	G2	1600m	Flemington	13	3	1:37.48	Good	4.25	(2.6 lengths)	John Allen
20 Oct 2018	3	Ethereal Stakes	G3	2000m	Caulfield	16	1	2:05.56	Soft	2.38	0.5 lengths	J Allen
3 Nov 2018	3	Wakeful Stakes	G2	2000m	Flemington	11	5	2:01.36	Good	2.38	(3.7 lengths)	J Allen
8 Nov 2018	3	VRC Oaks	G1	2500m	Flemington	15	7	2:40.54	Good	5.00	(6.1 lengths)	J Allen
16 Feb 2019	3	The Vanity	G3	1400m	Flemington	10	2	1:22.14	Good	7.00	(1 length)	James McDonald
16 Mar 2019	3	Phar Lap Stakes	G2	1500m	Rosehill	9	1	1:32.32	Heavy	2.25	3.5 lengths	J McDonald
30 Mar 2019	3	Vinery Stud Stakes	G1	2000m	Rosehill	11	1	2:08.99	Heavy	2.11	1.8 lengths	J McDonald
13 Apr 2019	3	Australian Oaks	G1	2400m	Randwick	14	1	2:31.26	Good	2.00	1.8 lengths	J McDonald
24 Aug 2019	4	Winx Stakes	G1	1400m	Randwick	10	9	1:21.05	Good	5.00	(3.8 lengths)	J McDonald
5 October 2019	4	Hill Stakes	G2	2000m	Randwick	8	1	2:05.3	Soft			J McDonald
29 February 2020	4	Chipping Norton Stakes	G1	1600m	Randwick	13	2	1:33.87	Good			J McDonald
21 March 2020	4	Ranvet Stakes	G1	2000m	Rosehill	7	2	2:04.90	Soft			J McDonald
28 March 2020	4	Tancred Stakes	G1	2400m	Rosehill	9	1	2:31.25	Soft			J McDonald
11 April 2020	4	Queen Elizabeth Stakes (ATC)	G1	2000m	Randwick	12	2	2:06.92	Heavy			Nash Rawiller
22 August 2020	5	Winx Stakes	G1	1400m	Randwick	16	1	1:23.26	Soft			J McDonald
3 October 2020	5	Turnbull Stakes	G1	2000m	Flemington	15	1	2:01.84	Good			Mark Zahra
17 October 2020	5	Caulfield Cup	G1	2400 m	Caulfield	18	1	2:31.97	Soft			M Zahra
3 November 2020	5	Melbourne Cup	G1	3200m	Flemington	23	7	3:17.34	Good			M Zahra
13 February 2021	5	Apollo Stakes	G2	1400m	Randwick	8	3	1:24.50	Soft			J McDonald
27 March 2021	6	Ranvet Stakes	G1	2000m	Rosehill	9	1	2:03.99	Soft			J McDonald
18 September 2021	6	George Main Stakes	G1	1600m	Randwick	9	1	1:36.07	Soft			J McDonald
23 October 2021	6	Cox Plate	G1	2040m	The Valley	8	3	2:06.97	Soft			Damian Lane
2 November 2021	6	Melbourne Cup	G1	3200m	Flemington	23	1	3:17.43	Good			J McDonald
26 February 2022	6	Chipping Norton Stakes	G1	1600m	Randwick	10	1	1:39.64	Heavy			J McDonald
19 March 2022	6	Ranvet Stakes	G1	2000 m	Rosehill	6	2	2:07.54	Heavy			J McDonald
9 April 2022	6	Queen Elizabeth Stakes (ATC)	G1	2000m	Randwick	9	5	2:10.87	Heavy			J McDonald
21 August 2022	7	Prix Jean Romanet	G1	2000m	Deauville	7	7	2:09.03	Good			Frankie Dettori
11 September 2022	7	Prix Foy	G2	2400m	Longchamp	6	3	2:36.46	Soft			Christophe Soumillon
1 October 2022	7	Prix de Royallieu	G1	2800m	Longchamp	10	7	3:13.76	Soft			M Zahra
15 October 2022	7	British Champions Fillies and Mares Stakes	G1	2406m	Ascot Racecourse	14	9	2:33.76	Soft			Mickael Barzalona

Source: Racingandsports, Racing.com profiles

== Pedigree ==
Pedigree of Verry Elleegant (NZ) 2015
Sire Zed (NZ) 2002	Zabeel (NZ); 1986	Sir Tristram	Sir Ivor
Sire Zed (NZ) 2002	Zabeel (NZ); 1986	Sir Tristram	Isolt
Sire Zed (NZ) 2002	Zabeel (NZ); 1986	Lady Giselle	Nureyev
Sire Zed (NZ) 2002	Zabeel (NZ); 1986	Lady Giselle	Valderna
Sire Zed (NZ) 2002	Emerald Dream (AUS); 1996	Danehill	Danzig
Sire Zed (NZ) 2002	Emerald Dream (AUS); 1996	Danehill	Razyana
Sire Zed (NZ) 2002	Emerald Dream (AUS); 1996	Theme Song	Sackford
Sire Zed (NZ) 2002	Emerald Dream (AUS); 1996	Theme Song	Cotehele House
Dam Opulence (NZ) 2005	Danroad (AUS); 1999	Danehill	Danzig
Dam Opulence (NZ) 2005	Danroad (AUS); 1999	Danehill	Razyana
Dam Opulence (NZ) 2005	Danroad (AUS); 1999	Strawberry Girl	Strawberry Road
Dam Opulence (NZ) 2005	Danroad (AUS); 1999	Strawberry Girl	Pay the Piper
Dam Opulence (NZ) 2005	Mulan Magic (AUS); 1999	King's Theatre	Sadler's Wells
Dam Opulence (NZ) 2005	Mulan Magic (AUS); 1999	King's Theatre	Regal Beauty
Dam Opulence (NZ) 2005	Mulan Magic (AUS); 1999	Chalet Girl	Imposing
Dam Opulence (NZ) 2005	Mulan Magic (AUS); 1999	Chalet Girl	Cotehele House (Family: 9-c)

- Verry Elleegant was inbred 3 × 3 to Danehill, meaning that this stallion appears twice in the third generation of her pedigree. She was also inbred 4 × 4 to the mare Cotehele House.

== See also ==
- List of Melbourne Cup winners
