= 2021 Melbourne Cup =

2021 Lexus Melbourne Cup

- Melbourne Cup
- Location: Flemington Racecourse; Melbourne, Australia
- Date: 2 November 2021
- Distance: 3,200 metres
- Winning horse: Verry Elleegant
- Starting price: $17
- Jockey: James McDonald
- Trainer: Chris Waller
- Surface: Grass
- Attendance: 10,000

It's now taking the lead Incentivise at the top of the straight at the 400 meters a length and a half Floating Artist, here's Verry Elleegant she's coming home. 300 to go the mighty mare, moves up to Incentivise and races on by then Floating Artist, Spanish Mission. But Verry Elleegant at the 150 the darling of the turf has raced clear three lengths Incentivise and it's Verry Elleegant 10 Group 1's and now the greatest of them all, the Melbourne Cup! Verry Elleegant wins by three and a half, Incentivise, Spanish Mission, Floating Artist!

— Commentator Matt Hill describes the climax of the race

The 2021 Melbourne Cup (known commercially as the 2021 Lexus Melbourne Cup) was the 161st running of the Melbourne Cup, a prestigious Australian Thoroughbred horse race. The race, run over 3,200 metres (1.988 mi), was held on 2 November 2021 at Melbourne's Flemington Racecourse.

The final field for the race was declared on 30 October 2021. The total prize money for the race was A$8 million, the same as the previous year.

Due to the COVID-19 pandemic, the public crowd was limited to 10,000 vaccinated attendees. Also, all horses are required fully CT scan to permit run the Melbourne Cup.

The race was won by Verry Elleegant, ridden by James McDonald and trained by Chris Waller. She became the first horse in 161 runnings of the cup to win from barrier 18.

== Field ==
Number	Horse	Trainer	Jockey	Weight (kg)	Barrier	Placing
1	Twilight Payment	Joseph O'Brien	Jye McNeil	58	2	11th
2	Incentivise	Peter Moody	Brett Prebble	57	15	2nd
3	Spanish Mission	Andrew Balding	Craig Williams	57	14	3rd
4	Verry Elleegant	Chris Waller	James McDonald	57	18	1st
5	Explosive Jack	Ciaron Maher & David Eustace	John Allen	54	4	15th
6	The Chosen One	Murray Baker & Andrew Forsman	Damian Lane	54	5	5th
7	Delphi	Anthony & Sam Freedman	Damien Oliver	53.5	3	7th
8	Ocean Billy	Chris Waller	Damien Thornton	53.5	13	23rd
9	Selino	Chris Waller	Ron Stewart	53.5	23	8th
10	Johnny Get Angry	Denis Pagan	Lachlan King	53	21	22nd
11	Knights Order	Gai Waterhouse & Adrian Bott	Daniel Stackhouse	53	9	19th
12	Persan	Ciaron Maher & David Eustace	Luke Currie	53	11	20th
13	Carif	Peter & Paul Snowden	Blaike McDougall	52.5	8	18th
14	Master of Wine	Michael, Wayne & John Hawkes	Fred Kersley	52.5	6	16th
15	Pondus	Robert Hickmott	Rachel King	52.5	1	17th
16	Grand Promenade	Ciaron Maher & David Eustace	Kerrin McEvoy	52	20	6th
17	Miami Bound	Danny O’Brien	Patrick Moloney	52	16	12th
18	Port Guillaume	Ben & JD Hayes	Harry Coffey	52	22	21st
19	She’s Ideel	Bjorn Baker	Craig Newitt	52	19	10th
20	Future Score	Matt Cumani	Dean Yendall	51.5	15	Scratched
21	Tralee Rose	Symon Wilde	Dean Holland	51	12	9th
22	Floating Artist	Ciaron Maher & David Eustace	Teo Nugent	50	10	4th
23	Great House	Chris Waller	Michael Dee	50	7	13th
24	Sir Lucan	Gai Waterhouse & Adrian Bott	Glen Boss	50	17	14th
