= Incentivise =

Australian Thoroughbred racehorse

- Sire: Shamus Award
- Grandsire: Snitzel
- Dam: Miss Argyle
- Damsire: Iglesia
- Sex: Gelding
- Foaled: 22 October 2016
- Country: Australia
- Colour: Bay
- Breeder: Windermere Stud
- Owner: Windermere Stud et al.
- Trainer: Steve Tregea (2020-2021); Peter Moody (2021 onwards)
- Record: 13: 9–1–0
- Earnings: AU$5,743,300

Major wins
- Tattersall's Cup (2021); Makybe Diva Stakes (2021); Turnbull Stakes (2021); Caulfield Cup (2021)

Incentivise (foaled 22 October 2016) is a multiple Group One winning Australian thoroughbred racehorse.

== Background ==
Incentivise was homebred by his owner and original trainer Steve Tregea at his Windermere Stud property in the Darling Downs of southern Queensland.

Incentivise's dam, Miss Argyle, has also produced three other Stakes winners, Ardrossan (by Redoute's Choice) winner of the Concorde Handicap in New Zealand; Cheyenne Warrior (by Not A Single Doubt) winner of the Gold Sovereign Stakes in Tasmania and Bergerac (by Drumbeats) winner of the Ipswich Cup.

== Racing career ==
=== 2020/21: four-year-old season ===
Incentivise had his first race start as a 4-year-old on the 19 August 2020 in an Ipswich maiden race over 1,350 metres. He finished 9th of 12 runners.

His next start was seven-months later at Eagle Farm where he finished sixth. Three weeks later he finished 8th at Toowoomba beaten 16 lengths.

On the 11 April 2021, Incentivise won his first race over 1,600 metres at Sunshine Coast Racecourse. Starting at odds of 17/1 he won by over 3 lengths.

Incentivise won again next start at the Sunshine Coast over 1,790 metres.

Incentivise would then win his next four starts over a period of six-weeks by huge margins. This included a 7 length win over 2,150 metres at Toowoomba, a 9 length victory over 1,810 metres at Eagle Farm, a 9 length victory at Ipswich over 2,500 metres, culminating with a 12 length victory in the Tattersall's Cup over 2,400 metres.

=== 2021/22: five-year-old season ===
Incentivise was transferred to the stable of Victorian trainer Peter Moody, with the main target being the upcoming 2021 Spring Racing Carnival.

On the 11 September 2021, Incentivise contested his first Group One race in the Makybe Diva Stakes at Flemington. Starting at $3.90, he was taken to the front by jockey Brett Prebble and was never headed, winning by a half length from the fast-finishing Mo'unga.

On 2 October, Incentivise ran in the Group One Turnbull Stakes at Flemington. He started at $2.70, behind the favourite Verry Elleegant at $2.10. He jumped well, settling in second on the rail with 1800m to run. He stayed in this position until the 400m, where he took the lead on the rail. He fought off a hard-charging Young Werther to claim his second Group One victory with a margin of half a length.

On the 16 October, Incentivise started the $2.25 favourite in the Caulfield Cup. Jumping from the widest barrier he settled just behind the leaders. At the 800m mark, jockey Prebble pulled out and swept around the leaders. He hit the front with 250m to go and won by a comfortable 3 lengths. Commentator Bruce McAvaney said of the performance, "What we have seen today, we've seen a horse that we thought was going to be a champion. And he is a champion. This is one of the great Caulfield Cup winners of all-time."

On the 2 November, Incentivise started as the $2.90 favourite in the 2021 Melbourne Cup. After sitting just behind the leader throughout the race, he hit the front at the top of the Flemington straight, only to be overtaken by Verry Elleegant who went on to win the race by 4 lengths, with Incentivise finishing in second position. There were fears after the race that the horse may have suffered an injury after pulling up lame and experiencing swelling in his fetlock. Scans however revealed no serious injury. Trainer Peter Moody reported, "He’s still a bit battle-weary. He did himself extremely proud and we are extremely proud of him. He got beat by an absolute champion".

== Pedigree ==
Pedigree of Incentivise (AUS) 2016
| Sire Shamus Award (AUS) 2010 | Snitzel (AUS); 2002 | Redoute's Choice | Danehill |
| Sire Shamus Award (AUS) 2010 | Snitzel (AUS); 2002 | Redoute's Choice | Shantha's Choice |
| Sire Shamus Award (AUS) 2010 | Snitzel (AUS); 2002 | Snippets' Lass | Snippets |
| Sire Shamus Award (AUS) 2010 | Snitzel (AUS); 2002 | Snippets' Lass | Snow Finch |
| Sire Shamus Award (AUS) 2010 | Sunset Express (AUS); 1999 | Success Express | Hold Your Peace |
| Sire Shamus Award (AUS) 2010 | Sunset Express (AUS); 1999 | Success Express | Au Printemps |
| Sire Shamus Award (AUS) 2010 | Sunset Express (AUS); 1999 | Finito Fling | Luskin Star |
| Sire Shamus Award (AUS) 2010 | Sunset Express (AUS); 1999 | Finito Fling | From The Wood |
| Dam Miss Argyle (AUS) 2004 | Iglesia (AUS); 1995 | Last Tycoon | Try My Best |
| Dam Miss Argyle (AUS) 2004 | Iglesia (AUS); 1995 | Last Tycoon | Mill Princess |
| Dam Miss Argyle (AUS) 2004 | Iglesia (AUS); 1995 | Yodell | Marscay |
| Dam Miss Argyle (AUS) 2004 | Iglesia (AUS); 1995 | Yodell | Yodelling Lady |
| Dam Miss Argyle (AUS) 2004 | Precious Pearl (AUS); 1992 | Semipalatinsk | Nodouble |
| Dam Miss Argyle (AUS) 2004 | Precious Pearl (AUS); 1992 | Semipalatinsk | School Board |
| Dam Miss Argyle (AUS) 2004 | Precious Pearl (AUS); 1992 | Showsay | Head Over Heels |
| Dam Miss Argyle (AUS) 2004 | Precious Pearl (AUS); 1992 | Showsay | Mink and Pearls |
