= Shamus Award (horse) =

Australian-bred Thoroughbred racehorse

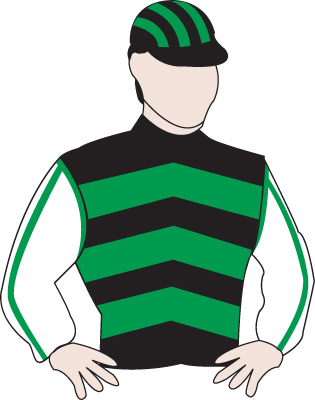
- Racing silks of Shamus Award
- Sire: Snitzel (Aus)
- Grandsire: Redoute's Choice (Aus)
- Dam: Sunset Express (Aus)
- Damsire: Success Express (USA)
- Sex: Colt
- Foaled: 2010
- Country: Australia
- Colour: Bay
- Breeder: Vinery Stud
- Owner: Sean Buckley & G & C Pastoral Co Pty Ltd (Mgr: V C Oldfield)
- Trainer: Danny O'Brien
- Record: 14:2-3-5
- Earnings: A$2.4 million

Major wins
- W S Cox Plate (2013); Australian Guineas (2014)

Shamus Award (foaled 2010) is an Australian thoroughbred racehorse, and winner of the 2013 Cox Plate. He is notable for being the only horse in the history of the race to win it as a maiden. Shamus Award was sired by Snitzel out of Sunset Express and was trained by Danny O'Brien.

== Early career ==
Shamus Award made his racing debut at Moonee Valley Racecourse on the same day as the 2012 Cox Plate running 3rd in a two year old's race. He placed 3rd in his next two races before entering his first Group One race, the 2013 Blue Diamond Stakes where as a 100/1 shot he ran an eye catching 5th. During the 2013 Melbourne Spring Racing Carnival Shamus Award ran 2nd first up before putting in a poor seventh. In the Group 2 Bill Sutt Stakes he was beaten by a nose and had a protest overturned before running 3rd in the Group 1 Caulfield Guineas putting in a huge late run to make up ground on the eventual winner Long John after early troubles.

== 2013 Cox Plate ==
Trainer Danny O'Brien elected to pay up for the Cox Plate as a last-minute decision, citing that despite his status as a maiden his rating of 109 was higher than that of the last three-year-old winner of the Cox Plate So You Think in 2010. Due to his status as a maiden Shamus Award was only included as an emergency but with the last minute withdrawal and subsequent retirement of race favourite Atlantic Jewel Shamus Award was moved into the main field. There was a feeling inside the racing community that Shamus Award had not deserved his place in such a prestigious race due to his status as a maiden. As the race began, Shamus Award showed early speed and as a result apprentice jockey Chad Schofield elected to take the lead and dictate the pace. Shamus Award led the race from start to finish shaking off fancied stayer Fiorente at the final turn, before withstanding a late charge by Turnbull Stakes winner Happy Trails, to become the first maiden to win the Cox Plate, giving jockey Chad Schofield his first Group 1 victory and making him the first apprentice to win the race since 1975.

== Retirement ==
Shamus Award was retired from racing in May 2014 and initially stood at Widden Stud in the Hunter Valley for a fee of A$27,500.

== Stud career ==
=== Notable progeny ===
Shamus Award Group 1 winners:

c = colt, f = filly, g = gelding

Foaled	Name	Sex	Major wins
2015	Mr Quickie	g	Queensland Derby, Toorak Handicap
2016	Incentivise	g	Makybe Diva Stakes, Turnbull Stakes, Caulfield Cup
2017	Duais	f	Queensland Oaks, Australian Cup, Tancred Stakes
2017	Media Award	f	Australasian Oaks
2018	El Patroness	f	Australian Oaks
2020	Quintessa	f	Levin Classic, Proisir Plate
