= Maldivian (horse) =

New Zealand-bred and Australian trained thoroughbred racehorse

- Sire: Zabeel
- Grandsire: Sir Tristram
- Dam: Shynzi (USA)
- Damsire: Danzig (USA)
- Sex: Gelding
- Foaled: 20/10/2002
- Country: New Zealand
- Colour: Bay
- Breeder: Sir Patrick & Lady Justine Hogan
- Trainer: Mark Kavanagh
- Record: 30: 9-5-5
- Earnings: $2,821,800

Major wins
- 2007 Easter Cup; 2007 JRA Cup; 2007 Yalumba Stakes; 2008 Cox Plate; 2009 C F Orr Stakes
- Last updated on 20 April 2024

Maldivian (foaled 20 October 2002) was a New Zealand bred Thoroughbred racemare, trained by Mark Kavanagh, who is notable for winning the 2008 Cox Plate and two other Group 1 races.

Sir Patrick & Lady Justine Hogan bred Maldivian from the American mare Shynzi, by the leading sire Zabeel. He was exported to Australia in April 2004.

== Racing record ==
Notable performances by Maldivian include:

- 1st in the 2007 Easter Cup (Group 3, Caulfield), beating Duoro Valley and Spinney
- 1st in the 2007 JRA Cup (listed race), beating Pacino and Master O'Reilly
- 1st in the 2007 Yalumba Stakes (Group 1), beating Miss Finland and Anamoto
- 1st in the 2008 Cox Plate (Group 1), beating Zipping and Samantha Miss
- 1st in the 2009 C F Orr Stakes (Group 1), beating Alamosa and Theseo.

Maldivian was the short priced favourite in the 2007 Caulfield Cup but was a late-scratching due to badly gashing his head in the barrier stalls.

Maldivian was retired from racing after a tendon injury he picked up during trackwork. He spent his remaining years at Cityview Farm in Victoria.

Maldivian died in July 2021.
