= Tristarc Stakes =

- Class: Group 2
- Location: Caulfield Racecourse, Melbourne, Australia
- Inaugurated: 1982
- Race type: Thoroughbred - Flat racing
- Sponsor: Nationwide (2026)
- Website: Melbourne Racing Club

Race information
- Distance: 1,400 metres
- Surface: Turf
- Track: Left-handed
- Qualification: Mares four year old and older
- Weight: Set weights with penalties
- Purse: $300,000 (2026)

The Tristarc Stakes is a Melbourne Racing Club Group 2 Thoroughbred horse race for mares aged four-years-old and older, at Set Weights with penalties, over a distance of 1400 metres at Caulfield Racecourse, Melbourne, Australia in October.

== History ==
The race is named after the champion mare Tristarc, who won five Group 1 events including the 1985 Caulfield Stakes–Caulfield Cup double. The race initially was held on the first day of the MRC Spring Carnival but was later moved to the third day (Caulfield Cup day).

=== Name ===
- 1987 - Tristarc Quality
- 1988–2008 - Tristarc Stakes
- 2009–2010 - Harrolds Stakes
- 2011 onwards - Tristarc Stakes

=== Grade ===
- 1987–1993 - Listed Race
- 1994–2004 - Group 3 race
- 2005 onwards - Group 2 race

=== Distance ===
- 1987 – 1200 metres
- 1988 onwards - 1400 metres

== Winners ==
The following are past winners of the race.

- 2026 - Shadhavar
- 2025 - Abounding
- 2024 - Lady In Pink
- 2023 - Wrote To Arataki
- 2022 - Chain Of Lightning
- 2021 - Colette
- 2020 - Madam Rouge
- 2019 - Savatiano
- 2018 - Shumookh
- 2017 - Global Glamour
- 2016 - First Seal
- 2015 - La Passe
- 2014 - Sweet Idea
- 2013 - Red Tracer
- 2012 - Streama
- 2011 - More Joyous
- 2010 - Culminate
- 2009 - Typhoon Tracy
- 2008 - Mimi Lebrock
- 2007 - Miss Fantabulous
- 2006 - Nuclear Free
- 2005 - Infinite Grace
- 2004 - Our Egyptian Raine
- 2003 - Infinite Grace
- 2002 - Reactive
- 2001 - Pernod
- 2000 - Lady Marion
- 1999 - Bonanova
- 1998 - Camino Rose
- 1997 - Will Fly
- 1996 - Chlorophyll
- 1995 - Bionic Bess
- 1994 - Procrastinate
- 1993 - Mingling Glances
- 1992 - Danjiki
- 1991 - Reno Belle
- 1990 - Ice Cream Sundae
- 1989 - Whistling
- 1988 - Taffeta Bow
- 1987 - Canny Lass

== See also ==
- Caulfield Classic
- Caulfield Cup
- Caulfield Sprint
- Ethereal Stakes
- Moonga Stakes
- The Thousand Guineas
- List of Australian Group races
- Group races
