= Ethereal Stakes =

- Class: Group 3
- Location: Caulfield Racecourse, Melbourne, Australia
- Race type: Thoroughbred - Flat racing
- Sponsor: Sharp EIT Solutions (2026)

Race information
- Distance: 2,000 metres
- Surface: Turf
- Track: Left-handed
- Qualification: Three year old fillies
- Weight: Set weights with penalties
- Purse: $240,000 (2026)

The Ethereal Stakes is a Melbourne Racing Club Group 3 Thoroughbred horse race for three year old fillies, at Set Weights with penalties, over a distance of 2,000 metres at Caulfield Racecourse, Melbourne, Australia in October.

== History ==
The race is named after the champion mare Ethereal, who won the 2001 Caulfield Cup–Melbourne Cup double.

=== Name ===
- 2000–2001 - Foster's Light Ice Handicap
- 2002 - Carlton Draught Handicap
- 2003–2006 - Skyy Blue Plate
- 2007 - Fat Quaddies Cup
- 2008 - Perri Cutten Plate
- 2009 - Sportingbet Plate
- 2010 - Sportingbet Stakes
- 2011 onwards - Ethereal Stakes

=== Grade ===
- prior 2011 - Handicap
- 2011–2014 - Listed Race
- 2015 onwards - Group 3 race

== Winners ==
The following are past winners of the race.

- 2026 - Quick Finish
- 2025 - Spicy Lu
- 2024 - Too Darn Discreet
- 2023 - Autumn Angel
- 2022 - Renaissance Woman
- 2021 - Daisies
- 2020 - Chica Fuerte
- 2019 - Gamay
- 2018 - Verry Elleegant
- 2017 - Pinot
- 2016 - Eleonora
- 2015 - Dawnie Perfect
- 2014 - Set Square
- 2013 - Arabian Gold
- 2012 - Alzora
- 2011 - Gliding
- 2010 - Dizlago
- 2009 - Run For Naara
- 2008 - Estee
- 2007 - Try This
- 2006 - Amitola
- 2005 - Astronomia
- 2004 - Mango Daiquiri
- 2003 - Timbourina
- 2002 - Hierogram
- 2001 - Gold Lottey
- 2000 - Lolita Star

== See also ==
- Caulfield Classic
- Caulfield Cup
- Caulfield Sprint
- Moonga Stakes
- The Thousand Guineas
- Tristarc Stakes
- List of Australian Group races
- Group races
