= The Thousand Guineas =

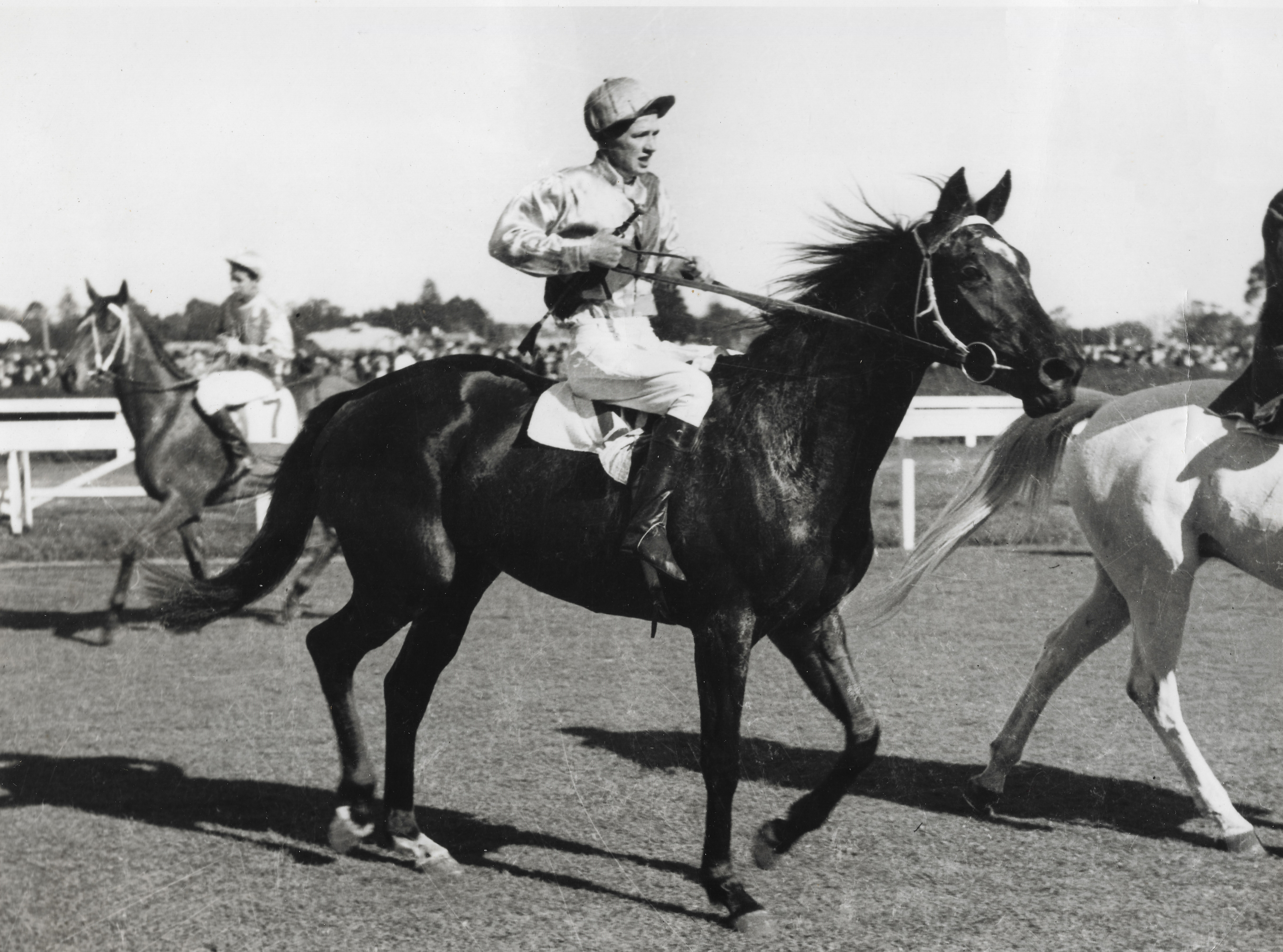
- Chicquita, 1949 winner
- Class: Group 1
- Location: Caulfield Racecourse, Melbourne, Australia
- Inaugurated: 1946
- Race type: Thoroughbred
- Sponsor: Schweppes (2007-25)

Race information
- Distance: 1,600 metres
- Surface: Turf
- Track: Left-handed
- Qualification: Three year old fillies
- Weight: Set weights – 55.5 kg
- Purse: $1,500,000 (2025)

The Thousand Guineas is a Melbourne Racing Club Group 1 Thoroughbred horse race for three year old fillies at set weights run over a distance of 1600 metres at Caulfield Racecourse, Melbourne, Australia in early October.

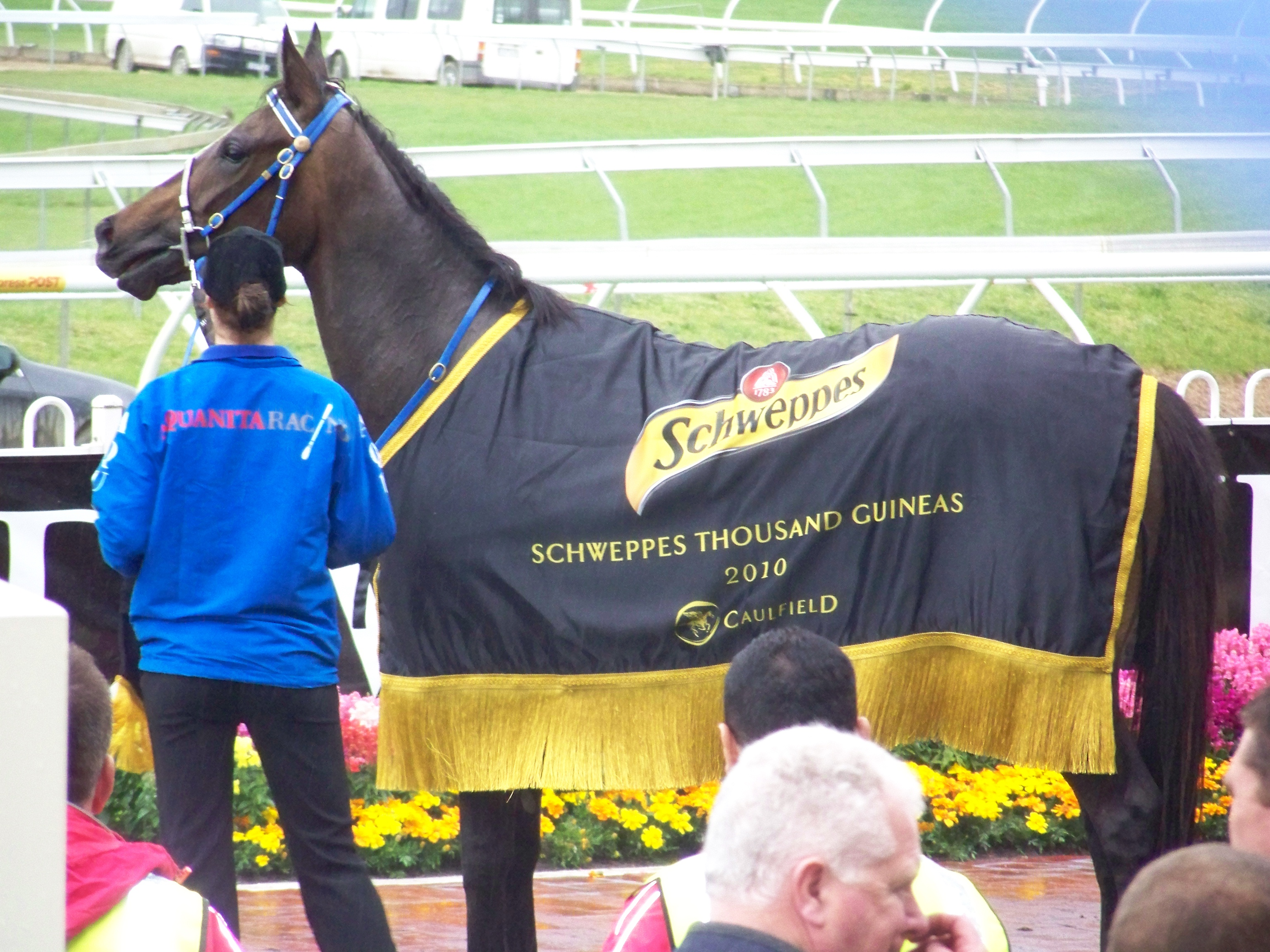
Yosei, 2010 winner wearing the winner's rug

== History ==
Prior to 1988, the race was run on the third day of the carnival on the Caulfield Cup racecard. Between 1988 and 2013 the race was scheduled on the second day of the MRC Spring Carnival which is held on a Wednesday but it was moved to the first day in 2014 until 2020. From 2021 to 2022, the race was again moved onto the second day of the MRC Spring Carnival before moving to the first saturday after the Melbourne Cup Carnival, leaving the MRC Spring Carnival.

=== Distance ===
- 1946–1971 - 1 mile (~1600 metres)
- 1972 onwards - 1600 metres

=== Grade ===
- 1946–1978 - Principal Race
- 1979 onwards - Group 1

=== 1950 racebook ===
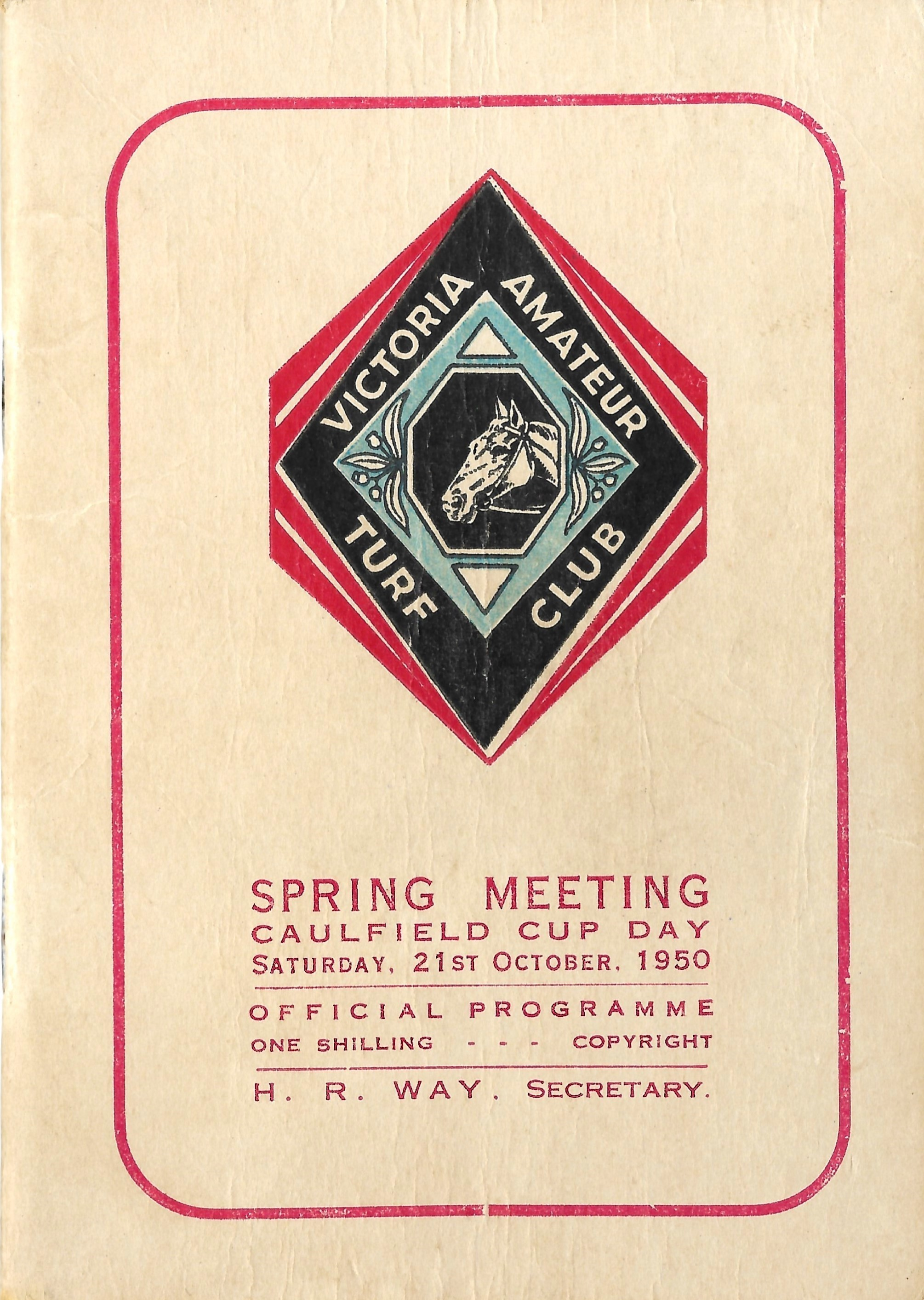
1950 VATC Caulfield Cup racebook front cover

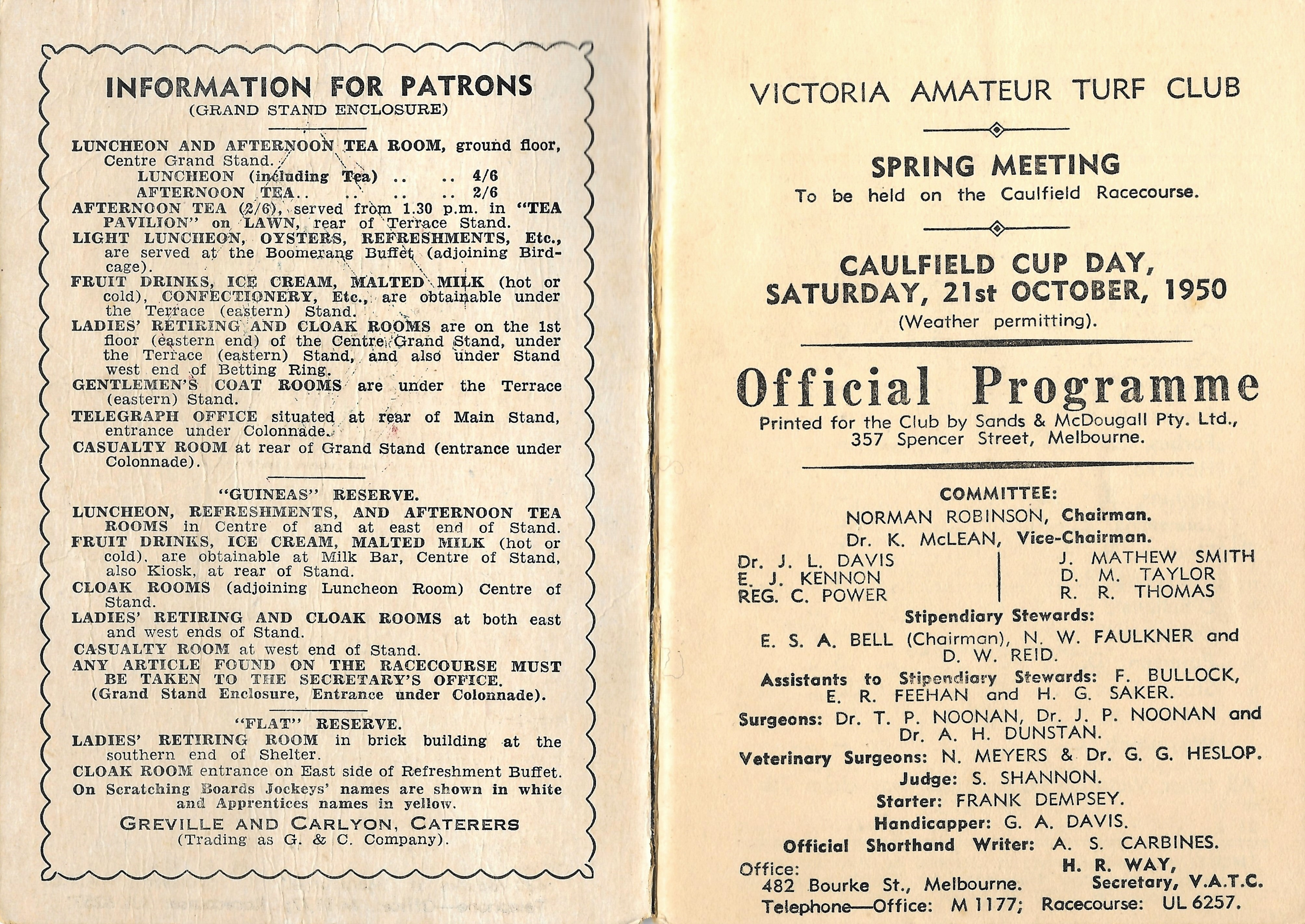
1950 VATC Caulfield Cup raceday officials

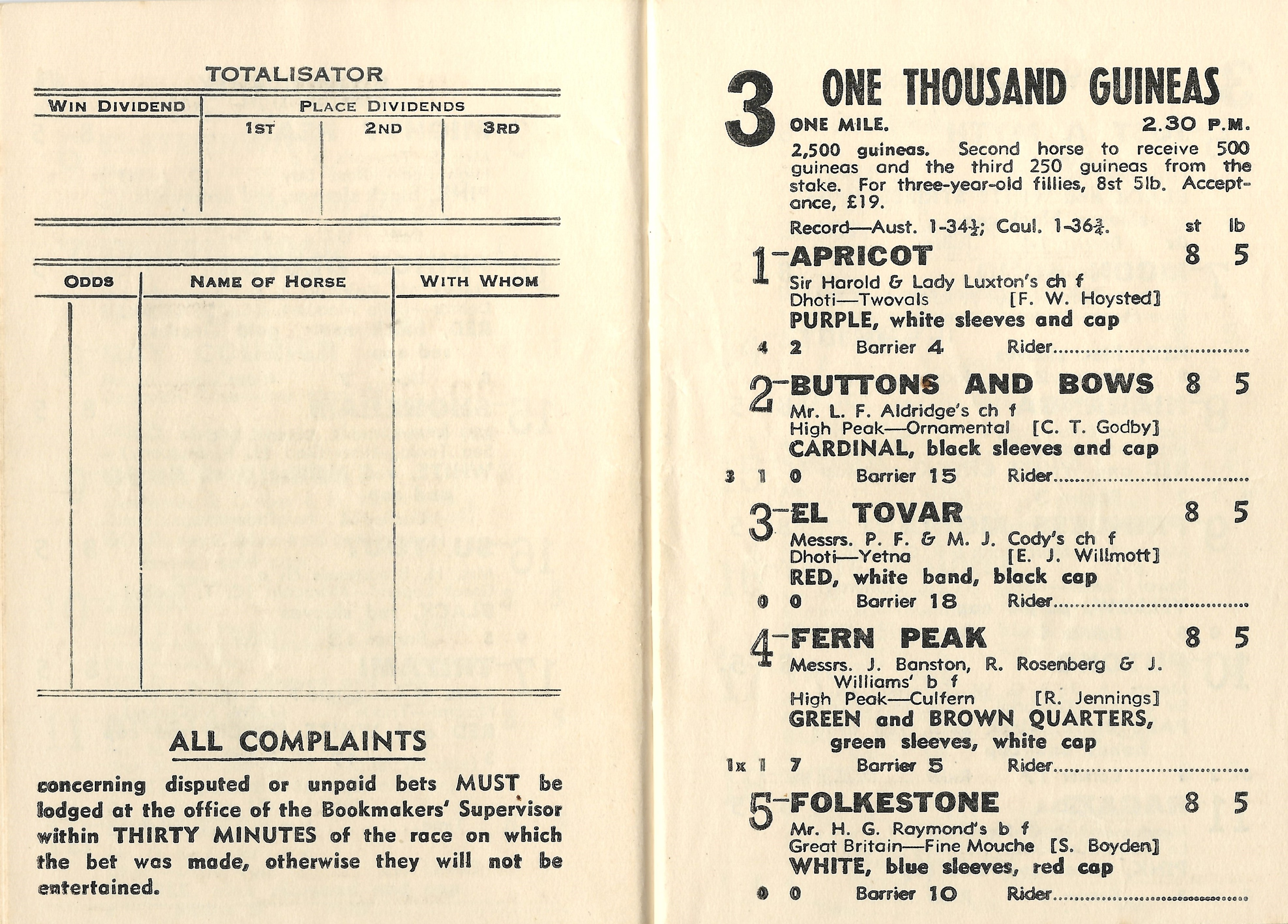
1950 VATC One Thousand Guineas page showing starters & results

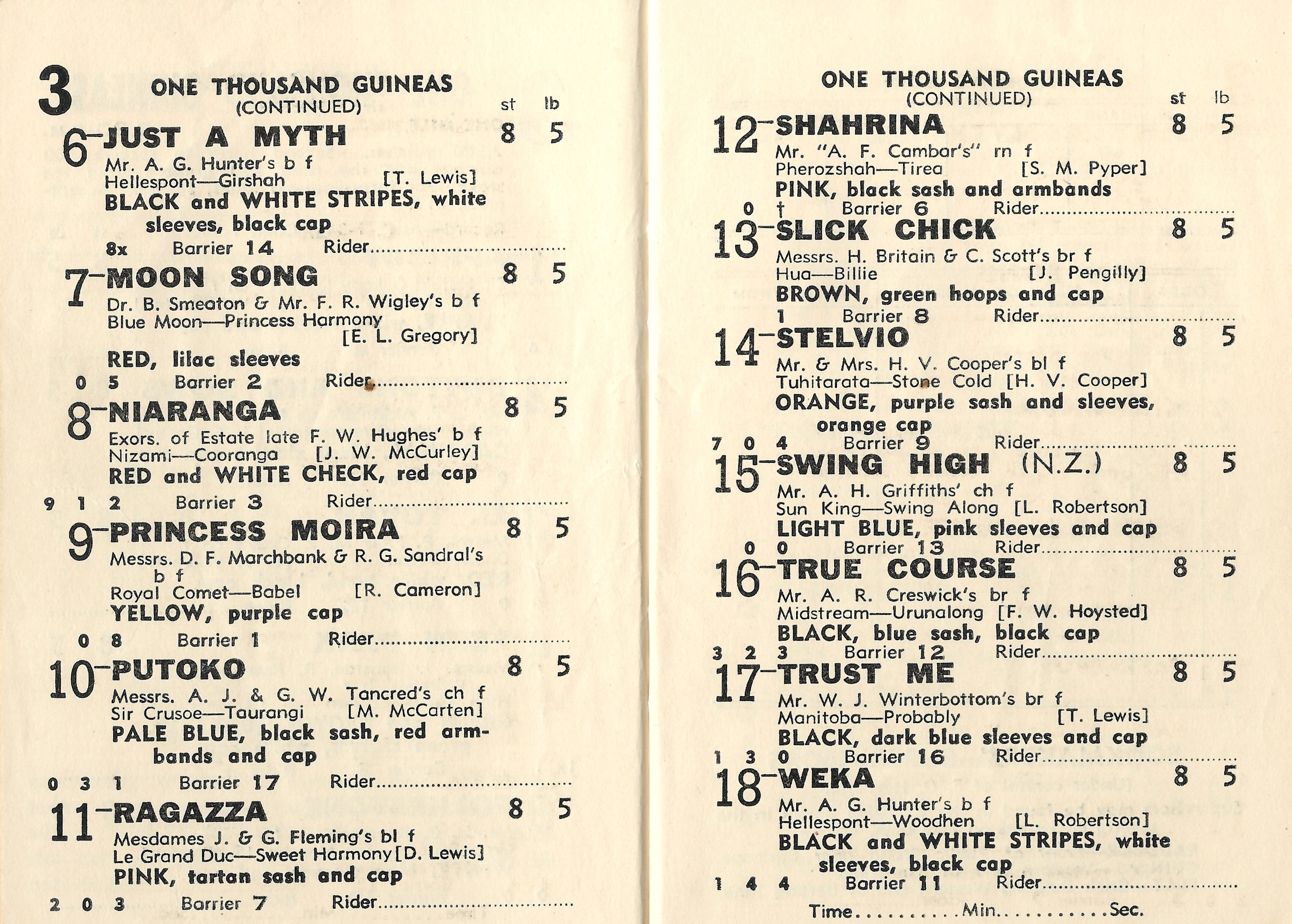
1950 VATC One Thousand Guineas page showing the winner, True Course

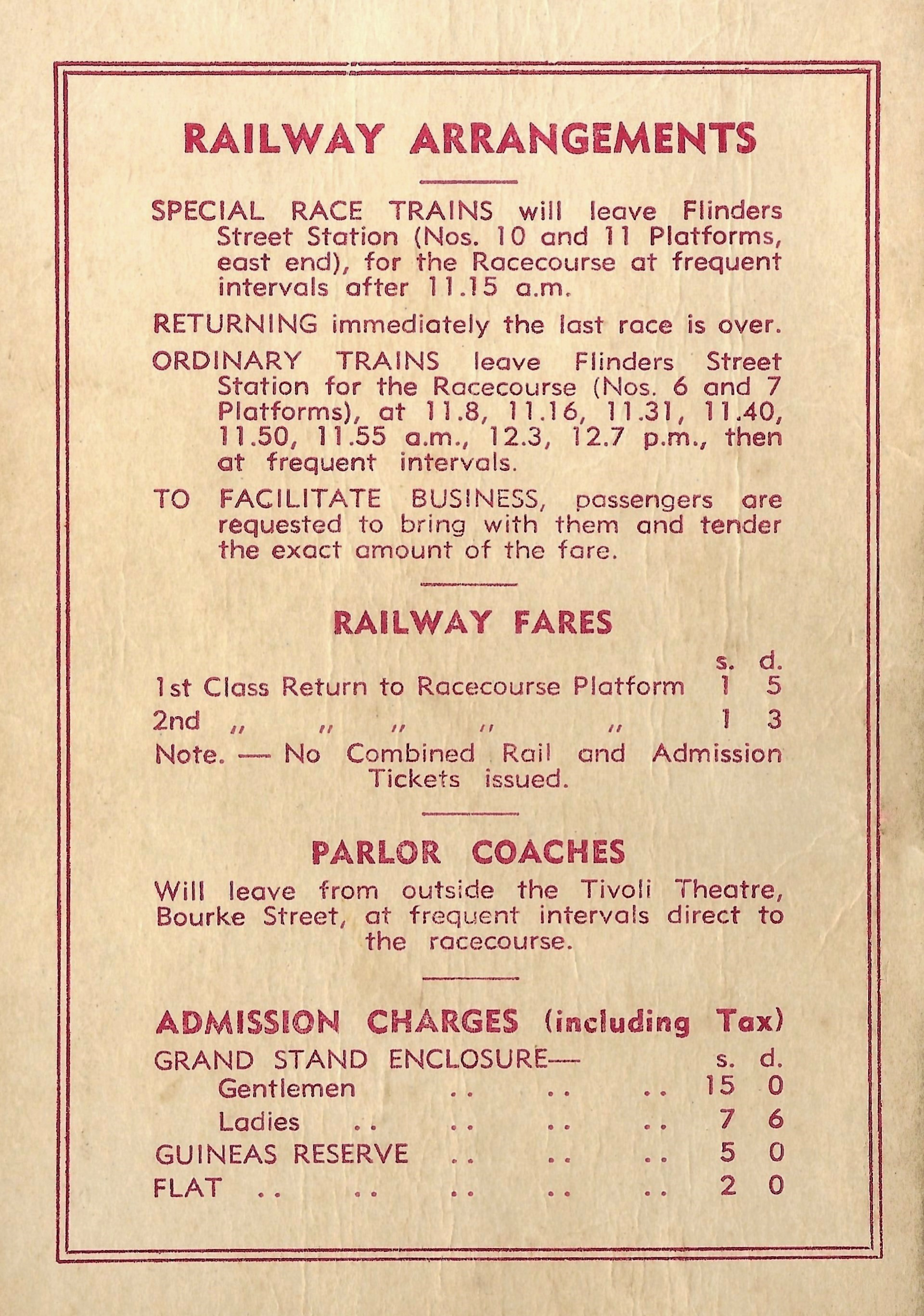
Back cover showing railway arrangements and charges at the entrance gates

== Winners ==
The following are past winners of the race.

- 2025 - Ole Dancer
- 2024 - Another Prophet
- 2023 - Joliestar
- 2022 - Madame Pommery
- 2021 - Yearning
- 2020 - Odeum
- 2019 - Flit
- 2018 - Amphitrite
- 2017 - Aloisia
- 2016 - Global Glamour
- 2015 - Stay With Me
- 2014 - Amicus
- 2013 - Guelph
- 2012 - Commanding Jewel
- 2011 - Atlantic Jewel
- 2010 - Yosei
- 2009 - Irish Lights
- 2008 - Gallica
- 2007 - Serious Speed
- 2006 - Miss Finland
- 2005 - Mnemosyne
- 2004 - Alinghi
- 2003 - Special Harmony
- 2002 - Macedon Lady
- 2001 - Magical Miss
- 2000 - All Time High
- 1999 - Shizu
- 1998 - Inaflury
- 1997 - Lady Of The Pines
- 1996 - Dashing Eagle
- 1995 - Shame
- 1994 - Northwood Plume
- 1993 - Arborea
- 1992 - Azzurro
- 1991 - Richfield Lady
- 1990 - Whisked
- 1989 - Tristanagh
- 1988 - Riverina Charm
- 1987 - Bianco Flyer
- 1986 - Magic Flute
- 1985 - Shankhill Lass
- 1984 - Goleen
- 1983 - Perfect Bliss
- 1982 - Rom’s Stiletto
- 1981 - Copperama
- 1980 - Biscadale
- 1979 - Brava Jeannie
- 1978 - Kapalaran
- 1977 - Princess Talaria
- 1976 - Savoir
- 1975 - Toy Show
- 1974 - Sufficient
- 1973 - Just Topic
- 1972 - Toltrice
- 1971 - What’s The Verdict
- 1970 - Tango Miss
- 1969 - Wood Court Inn
- 1968 - Our Faith
- 1967 - Begonia Bell
- 1966 - Cendrillon
- 1965 - Gipsy Queen
- 1964 - Reveille
- 1963 - †Heirloom / Anna Rose
- 1962 - Regal Peace
- 1961 - Indian Summer
- 1960 - Wenona Girl
- 1959 - Chaise
- 1958 - But Beautiful
- 1957 - Goldenway
- 1956 - Bendrum
- 1955 - Brimses
- 1954 - Lady Mogambo
- 1953 - Olympic Girl
- 1952 - Trunnion
- 1951 - Golden Chariot
- 1950 - True Course
- 1949 - Chicquita
- 1948 - Siren Song
- 1947 - Nizam’s Ring
- 1946 - Sweet Chime

† Dead heat

== See also ==
- Caulfield Classic
- Caulfield Cup
- Caulfield Sprint
- Ethereal Stakes
- Moonga Stakes
- Tristarc Stakes
- List of Australian Group races
- Group races
