= Caulfield Sprint =

- Class: Group 2
- Location: Caulfield Racecourse, Melbourne, Australia
- Inaugurated: 1983 (as Racing Museum Sprint)
- Race type: Thoroughbred - Flat racing
- Sponsor: Henley Homes (2026)

Race information
- Distance: 1,000 metres
- Surface: Turf
- Track: Left-handed
- Qualification: Maidens ineligible
- Weight: Handicap
- Purse: $300,000 (2026)

The Caulfield Sprint is a Melbourne Racing Club Group 2 Thoroughbred horse race held under open handicap conditions, for horses aged three years old and upwards, over a distance of 1000 metres, held at Caulfield Racecourse, Melbourne, Australia in October.

== History ==
The event is scheduled on the third day of the MRC Spring Carnival (Caulfield Cup Day). After the champion sprinter Schillaci won this race in 1994, the following year the race was renamed after the thoroughbred to the Schillaci Stakes. The race was run from 1995 to 1999 under this name but the following year the Victoria Amateur Turf Club made a decision to rename the Chirnside Stakes to the Schillaci Stakes.

=== Grade ===
- 1983–1992 - Listed race
- 1993–1998 - Group 3
- 1999 onwards - Group 2

=== Name ===
- 1983–1984 - Racing Museum Sprint
- 1985 - Brylcreem Sprint Championship
- 1986 - National Sprint Championship
- 1987–1991 - Caulfield Sprint
- 1992 - Jupiter's Casino Sprint
- 1993 - Conrad Jupiter's Sprint
- 1994 - Caulfield Sprint
- 1995–1999 - Schillaci Stakes
- 2000–2001 - Mercedes-Benz Sprint
- 2002 - National Telecoms Group Sprint
- 2003–2005 - Dodo Internet Sprint
- 2006–2009 - Thai Airways International Sprint
- 2010 onwards - Caulfield Sprint

=== Distance ===
- 1983–2014 – 1100 metres
- 2015 onwards - 1000 metres

== Winners ==
The following are past winners of the race.

- 2026 - Cavalry Girl
- 2025 - Rey Magnerio
- 2024 - Estriella
- 2023 - Doull
- 2022 - Asfoora
- 2021 - Oxley Road
- 2020 - Graff
- 2019 - Miss Leonidas
- 2018 - Eduardo
- 2017 - Snitty Kitty
- 2016 - Our Boy Malachi
- 2015 - † Eclair Choice / Lumosty
- 2014 - † Miracles Of Life / Bel Sprinter
- 2013 - Spirit Of Boom
- 2012 - Howmuchdoyouloveme
- 2011 - Sepoy
- 2010 - Set For Fame
- 2009 - First Command
- 2008 - Sunburnt Land
- 2007 - Tesbury Jack
- 2006 - Biscayne Bay
- 2005 - Jet Spur
- 2004 - Lilando
- 2003 - Blur
- 2002 - Rubitano
- 2001 - Windigo
- 2000 - Camena
- 1999 - Notoire
- 1998 - Toledo
- 1997 - Toledo
- 1996 - Ruffles
- 1995 - Petite Amour
- 1994 - Schillaci
- 1993 - Royal Discard
- 1992 - Tanjian Prince
- 1991 - Euclase
- 1990 - Rise ‘N’ Shine
- 1989 - Lonely Dreamer
- 1988 - Rendoo
- 1987 - Lord Scotia
- 1986 - Bullion Broker
- 1985 - Campaign King
- 1984 - River Rough
- 1983 - Bow Mistress

† Dead heat

== See also ==
- Caulfield Classic
- Caulfield Cup
- Ethereal Stakes
- Moonga Stakes
- The Thousand Guineas
- Tristarc Stakes
- List of Australian Group races
- Group races
