= Streets of Avalon =

Australian Thoroughbred racehorse

Streets Of Avalon
- Sire: Magnus
- Grandsire: Flying Spur
- Dam: Kamuniak
- Damsire: Black Minnaloushe
- Sex: Gelding
- Foaled: 9 October 2014
- Country: Australia
- Colour: Bay
- Breeder: Warren Racing Pty Ltd
- Owner: Warren Racing, D Healy, P Farrell, D Dobe, S Foxwell
- Trainer: Shane Nichols
- Record: 71: 10–11–11
- Earnings: A$ 2,436,750

Major wins
- Victoria Handicap (2019); Moonga Stakes (2019); Futurity Stakes (2020); Australia Stakes (2021); C F Orr Stakes (2021)

Streets Of Avalon (foaled 9 October 2014) is a retired multiple Group 1 winning Australian thoroughbred racehorse.

== Background ==
Streets Of Avalon was sired by Magnus, who won the Group 1 Galaxy. He was offered for sale at the Inglis yearling sales, however was withdrawn and retained by his breeder.

== Racing career ==
Streets of Avalon first raced as a late autumn 2 year old, but didn’t win until his 7th start in a 3 year old maiden at Bairnsdale, Victoria.

His first stakes victory came in the Listed Hareeba Stakes in 2019 at Mornington Racecourse. Further stakes success followed in 2019 with the horse winning two Group 3 races, the Victoria Handicap and the Moonga Stakes.

In 2020, he led all the way to victory in the Group 1 Futurity Stakes at Caulfield Racecourse. On a day when the track was favouring horses up on the pace and near the rail, it played to his strengths, and after being backed from $26 into $9.50 he won by a long head.

Streets of Avalon would not achieve victory in his next 9 starts throughout 2020. In 2021 he won the Group 2 Australia Stakes and the Group 1 C F Orr Stakes in succession.
