= Easter Cup =

- Class: Group 3
- Location: Caulfield Racecourse
- Inaugurated: 1909
- Race type: Thoroughbred
- Sponsor: Tobin Brothers (2022-26)

Race information
- Distance: 2,000 metres
- Surface: Turf
- Qualification: Maidens ineligible
- Weight: Handicap; Minimum – 54kg
- Purse: $200,000 (2026)

The Easter Cup is a Melbourne Racing Club Group 3 Thoroughbred open handicap horse race, over a distance of 2000 metres, held at Caulfield Racecourse, Melbourne, Australia. The race is traditionally held on Easter Saturday.

== History ==
- From 1949 - 1961 the race was known as the Sandown Cup.

=== 1947 racebook ===
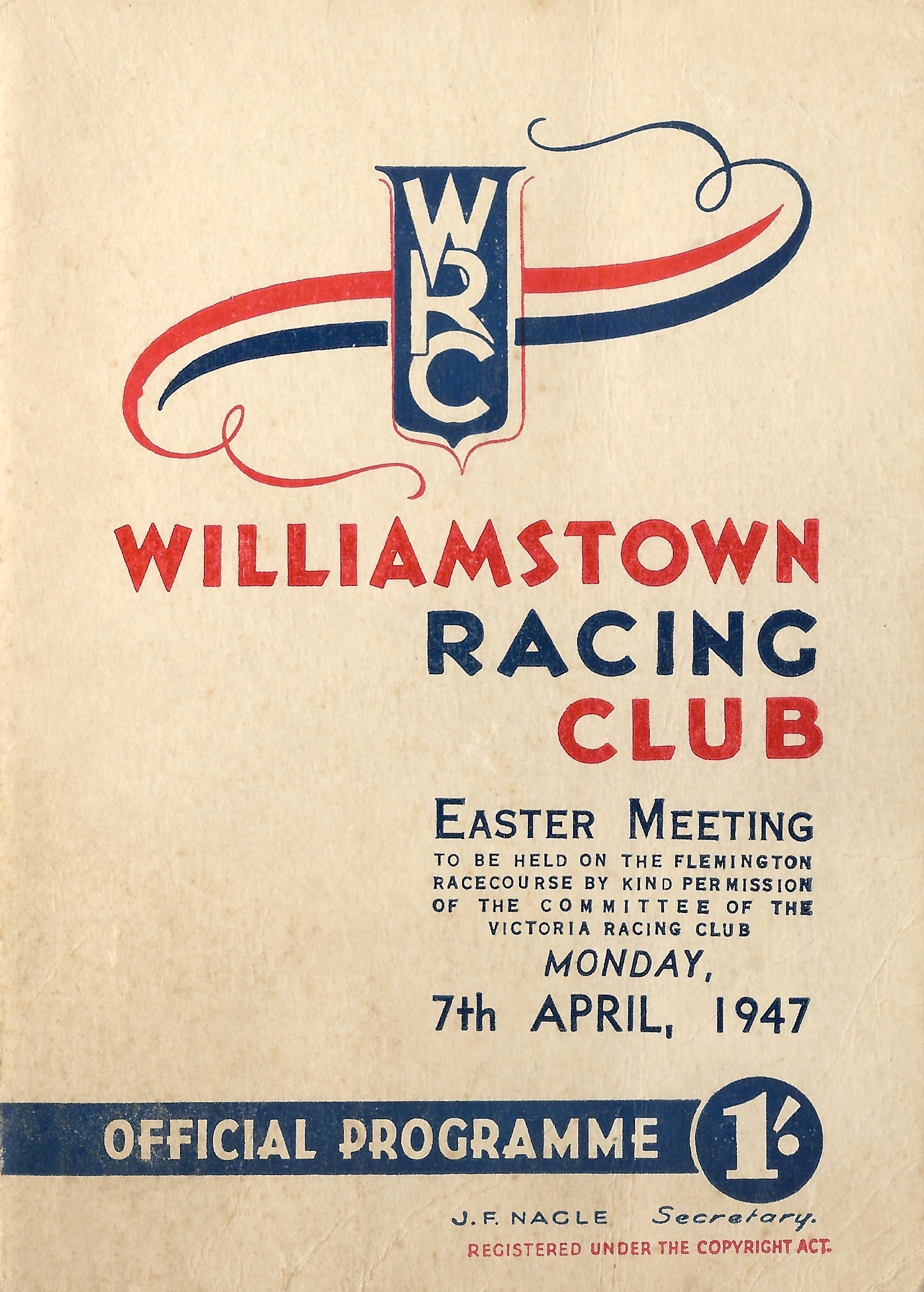
1947 WRC J. J. Liston Stakes racebook front cover

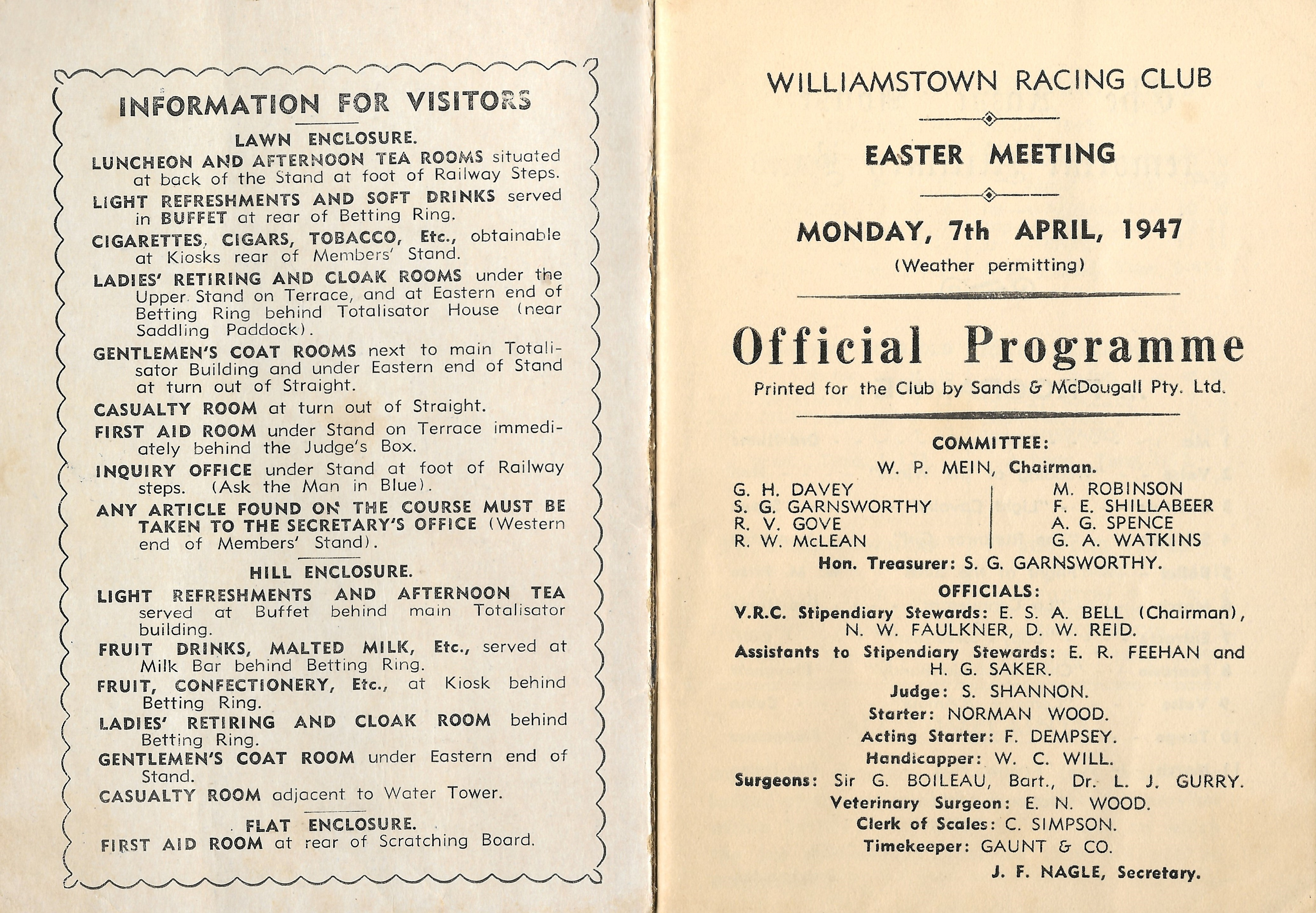
1947 WRC J. J. Liston Stakes officials & visitor information

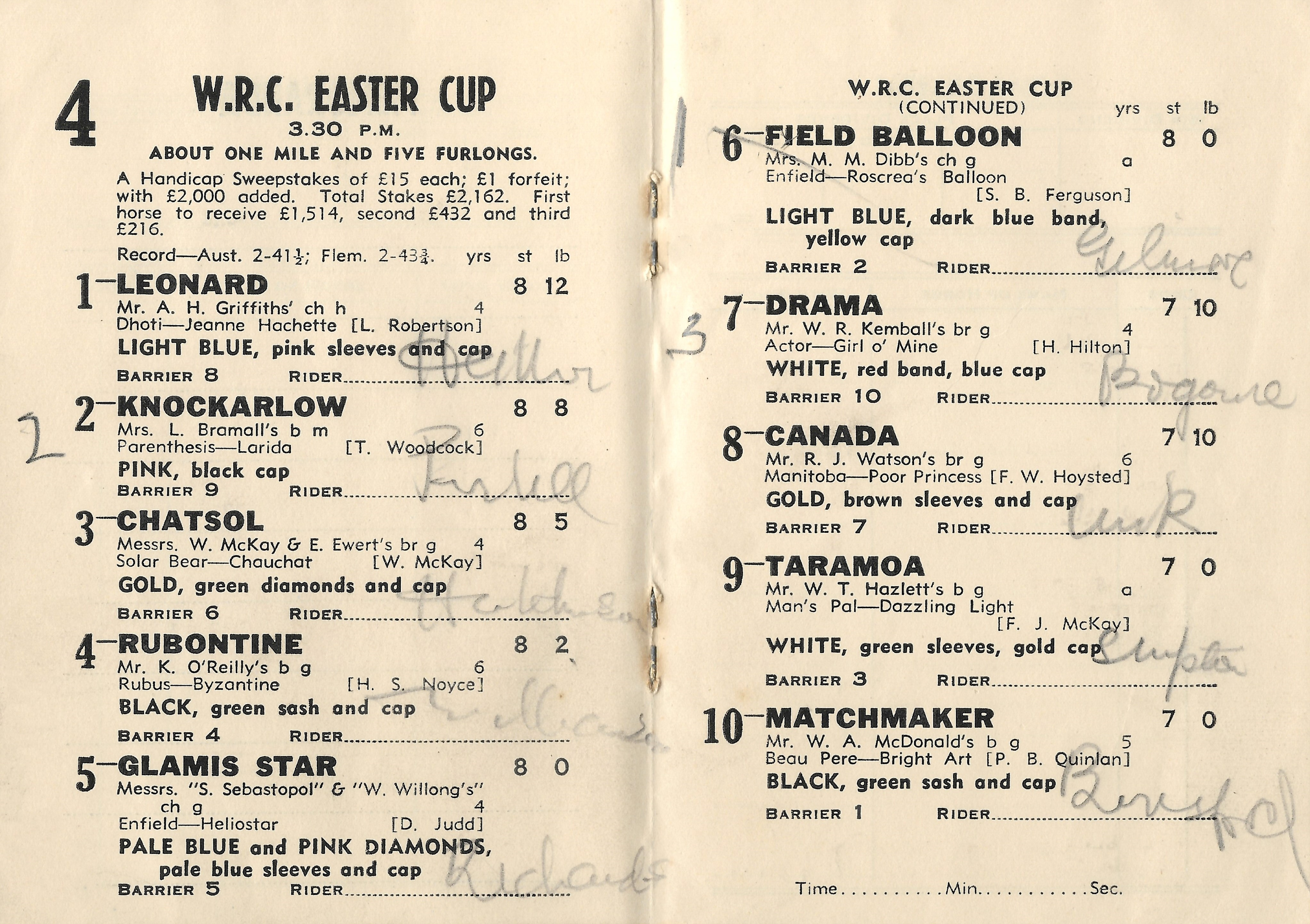
1947 WRC Easter Cup page showing the winner, Field Balloon

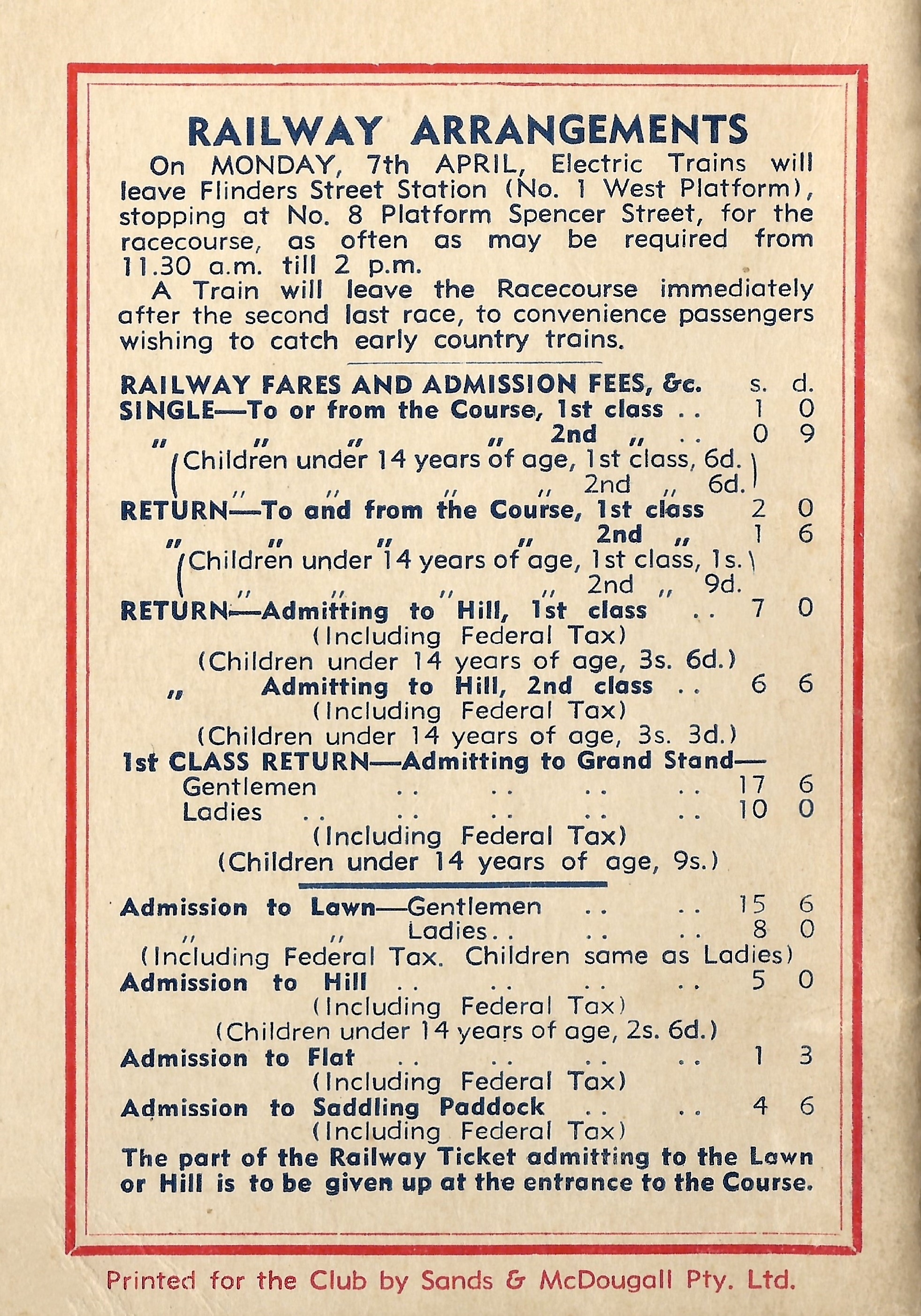
Back cover showing railway arrangements and admission fares

=== Grade ===
- 1909–1978 - Principal Race
- 1979 - Listed Race
- 1980 onwards - Group 3

=== Distance ===
- 1909–1911 - 1 1/4 miles (~2000 metres)
- 1912–1913 - 1 5/8 miles (~2600 metres)
- 1914 - 1 1/4 miles (~2000 metres)
- 1915–1956 - 1 5/8 miles (~2600 metres)
- 1957–1972 - 1 1/4 miles (~2000 metres)
- 1973 onwards - 2000 metres

== Winners ==
The following are past winners of the race.

- 2026 - Ambassadorial
- 2025 - Torranzino
- 2024 - Captain Envious
- 2023 - White Marlin
- 2022 - Milford
- 2021 - Hang Man
- 2020 - Inverloch
- 2019 - Plein Ciel
- 2018 - Shoreham
- 2017 - Observational
- 2016 - Leebaz
- 2015 - Sertorius
- 2014 - Our Voodoo Prince
- 2013 - Jet Away
- 2012 - Folding Gear
- 2011 - Paddy O'Reilly
- 2010 - Fanjura
- 2009 - Miss Maren
- 2008 - Like It Is
- 2007 - Maldivian
- 2006 - Casual Pass
- 2005 - Show Barry
- 2004 - Tall Timbers
- 2003 - Bush Padre
- 2002 - Thong Classic
- 2001 - Adolescence
- 2000 - Litmus
- 1999 - Il Don
- 1998 - Vonanne
- 1997 - True Identity
- 1996 - Sober Suit
- 1995 - Regal Half
- 1994 - Idea
- 1993 - Coolong Road
- 1992 - Mantlepiece
- 1991 - Ideal Centreman
- 1990 - Lord Palmeston
- 1989 - Go Timmy
- 1988 - King Of Brooklyn
- 1987 - Dandy Andy
- 1986 - Jewel Planet
- 1985 - Nearco Fair
- 1984 - Pass The Baton
- 1983 - Triumphal March
- 1982 - Paraparap
- 1981 - Amarla
- 1980 - Palace Gossip
- 1979 - Warri Symbol
- 1978 - North Sea
- 1977 - Princess Veronica
- 1976 - Favoured Bay
- 1975 - Bush Win
- 1974 - Warm Feeling
- 1973 - Adrian
- 1972 - Kazanlik
- 1971 - Lancelot
- 1970 - Cedar King
- 1969 - Future
- 1968 - Yootha
- 1967 - Pharaon
- 1966 - Future
- 1965 - Captain Blue
- 1964 - Scenic's Gift
- 1963 - Havelock
- 1962 - Serene Princess
- 1961 - Savage
- 1960 - Declaree
- 1959 - Webster
- 1958 - Tuki
- 1957 - Radiant Blue
- 1956 - Oxley
- 1955 - Hellion
- 1954 - Te Totara
- 1953 - Arabist
- 1952 - Catchfree
- 1951 - Prince O' Fairies6
- 1950 - Plovarius
- 1949 - Clement
- 1948 - Promise You
- 1947 - Field Balloon
- 1946 - Maniototo
- 1945 - Cellini
- 1944 - Sir Locket
- 1943 - Claudette
- 1942 - Ballycummins
- 1941 - Throttle
- 1940 - Mac Rob
- 1939 - Son Of Aurous
- 1938 - Irving
- 1937 - Demotic
- 1936 - Red Ray
- 1935 - Hot Shot
- 1934 - Flail
- 1933 - Flail
- 1932 - Prince Dayton
- 1931 - Ormolu
- 1930 - Mondiaga
- 1929 - Burnaby
- 1928 - Sun Morn
- 1927 - Buffline
- 1926 - Little Millie
- 1925 - Gay Serenader
- 1924 - Statton
- 1923 - Pendilson
- 1922 - Luteplayer
- 1921 - Accrington
- 1920 - Mnesarchus
- 1919 - Court Jester
- 1918 - Ashview
- 1917 - Defence
- 1916 - Atora
- 1915 - Meerut
- 1914 - La George
- 1913 - Riffian
- 1912 - Avenger
- 1911 - Riffian
- 1910 - Imprint
- 1909 - Otira

== See also ==
- Victoria Handicap
- List of Australian Group races
- Group races
