= Caulfield Classic =

Sportsbet Classic registered as the Norman Robinson Stakes
- Class: Group 3
- Location: Caulfield Racecourse
- Inaugurated: 1971 (as Wallace Stakes)
- Race type: Thoroughbred - Flat racing
- Sponsor: Sportsbet (2025 & 2026)
- Website: www.melbourneracingclub.net.au

Race information
- Distance: 2,000 metres
- Surface: Turf
- Track: Left-handed
- Qualification: Three-year-olds
- Weight: Set weights colts and geldings – 57 kg fillies 55 kg
- Purse: $240,000 (2026)

The Caulfield Classic, raced as the Sportsbet Classic due to sponsorship and registered as the Norman Robinson Stakes, is a Melbourne Racing Club Group 3 Thoroughbred horse race held under set weights conditions, for horses three years old, run over a distance of 2000 metres. It is held at Caulfield Racecourse in Melbourne, Australia on Caulfield Cup day in October.

== History ==
The race was run as a handicap until 1990, now run under set weight conditions. Originally the race was scheduled on the second day of the VATC Spring carnival. The registered name of the race is named after the former VATC Chairman Norman Robinson who was elected to that position in 1942. The MRC increased the prizemoney in 2014 to A$750,000 with a $250,000 bonus to the winner of the Caulfield Guineas or Thousand Guineas if they are able to win both events. In 2015, the prizemoney was reduced to $500,000. The event is considered a strong preparatory race for the Victoria Derby.

=== Grade ===
- 1978 - Listed race
- 1978 - Special race
- 1980–1997 - Listed Race
- 1998–1999 - Group 3
- 2000–2004 - Group 2
- 2005 onwards - Group 3

=== Name ===
- 1971–1978 - Wallace Stakes
- 1979–1988 - Norman Robinson Stakes
- 1989 - Steeves Lumley Stakes
- 1990–2013 - Norman Robinson Stakes
- 2014–2015 - Caulfield Classic
- 2016 onwards - Ladbrokes Classic

=== Distance ===
The race has been run over 2000 metres with exceptions of:

- 1971 - 1 1/4 miles (~2000 metres)
- 1979 – 1984 metres
- 2003 – 2020 metres

=== Double winners ===
Thoroughbreds that have won the Norman Robinson Stakes – Victoria Derby double:

- Nothin’ Leica Dane (1995), Blackfriars (1999), Amalfi (2001), Polanski (2013)

== Winners ==
The following are past winners of the race.

- 2026 - King Snitz
- 2025 - Autumn Mystery
- 2024 - KingofWallStreet
- 2023 - Sunsets
- 2022 - Mr Maestro
- 2021 - Gunstock
- 2020 - Albarado
- 2019 - Thought Of That
- 2018 - Thinkin’ Big
- 2017 - Cliff's Edge
- 2016 - Good Standing
- 2015 - Sacred Eye
- 2014 - Fontein Ruby
- 2013 - Polanski
- 2012 - Hvasstan
- 2011 - Sabrage
- 2010 - Retrieve
- 2009 - Shamoline Warrior
- 2008 - Pre Eminence
- 2007 - Pillar Of Hercules
- 2006 - Get Square
- 2005 - Pendragon
- 2004 - Cedar Manor
- 2003 - Casual Pass
- 2002 - Platinum Scissors
- 2001 - Amalfi
- 2000 - Royale Exit
- 1999 - Blackfriars
- 1998 - Lawyer
- 1997 - Brave Prince
- 1996 - Mustang Ranch
- 1995 - Nothin’ Leica Dane
- 1994 - Punctual
- 1993 - Battle Hawk
- 1992 - River Hero
- 1991 - Lady Purpose
- 1990 - Big Dermott
- 1989 - Counterfeit
- 1988 - Panneria
- 1987 - Omnicorp
- 1986 - Dundas Lane
- 1985 - Born To Be Queen
- 1984 - Gold Deck
- 1983 - King Delamere
- 1982 - Brightman
- 1981 - Lordship
- 1980 - Bright Halo
- 1979 - Attack
- 1978 - Society Beau

== See also ==
- Caulfield Cup
- Caulfield Sprint
- Ethereal Stakes
- Moonga Stakes
- The Thousand Guineas
- Tristarc Stakes
- List of Australian Group races
- Group races
