= Victoria Handicap =

- Class: Group 3
- Location: Caulfield Racecourse, Melbourne, Australia
- Inaugurated: 1949
- Race type: Thoroughbred
- Sponsor: Sportsbet (2024-26)

Race information
- Distance: 1,400 metres
- Surface: Turf
- Track: Left-handed
- Qualification: Maidens ineligible
- Weight: Handicap; Minimum – 54kg
- Purse: $200,000 (2026)

The Victoria Handicap is a Melbourne Racing Club Group 3 Thoroughbred open handicap horse race, over a distance of 1400 metres, held annually at Caulfield Racecourse in Melbourne, Australia. The race is traditionally held on Easter Saturday.

== History ==
=== Name ===
In 2020 the event was raced as the Elvis Thurgood 40th Anniversary Cup in honor of former jockey Ricky Elvis Thurgood who suffered career ending injuries in 1980.

=== Grade ===
- 1949–1978 - Principal Race
- 1979 - Listed Race
- 1980 onwards - Group 3

=== Distance ===
- 1949–1972 - 7 furlongs (~ 1400 metres)
- 1973 onwards - 1400 metres

=== 1949 racebook ===
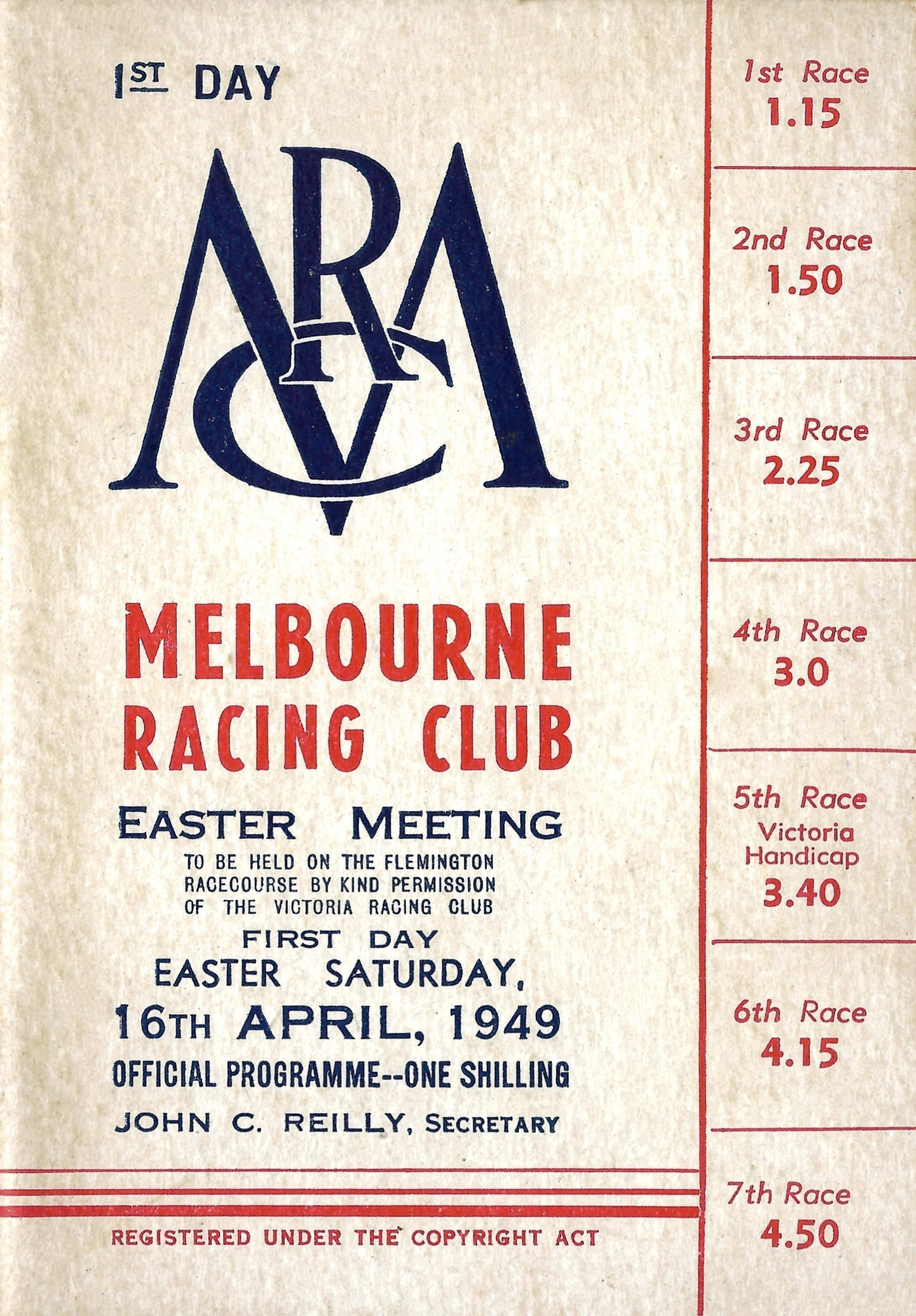
1949 MRC Victoria Handicap racebook front cover

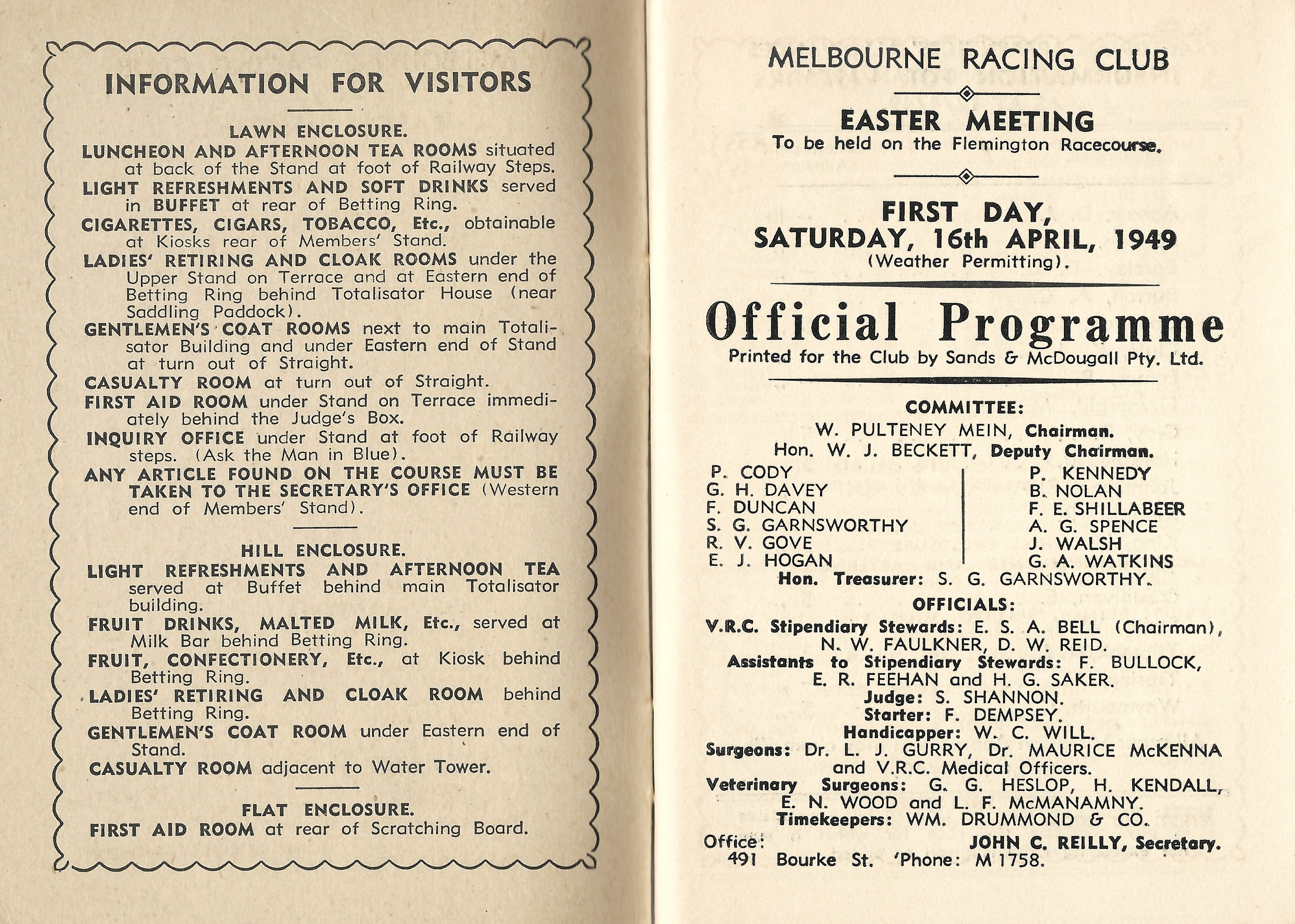
1949 MRC Victoria Handicap raceday officials

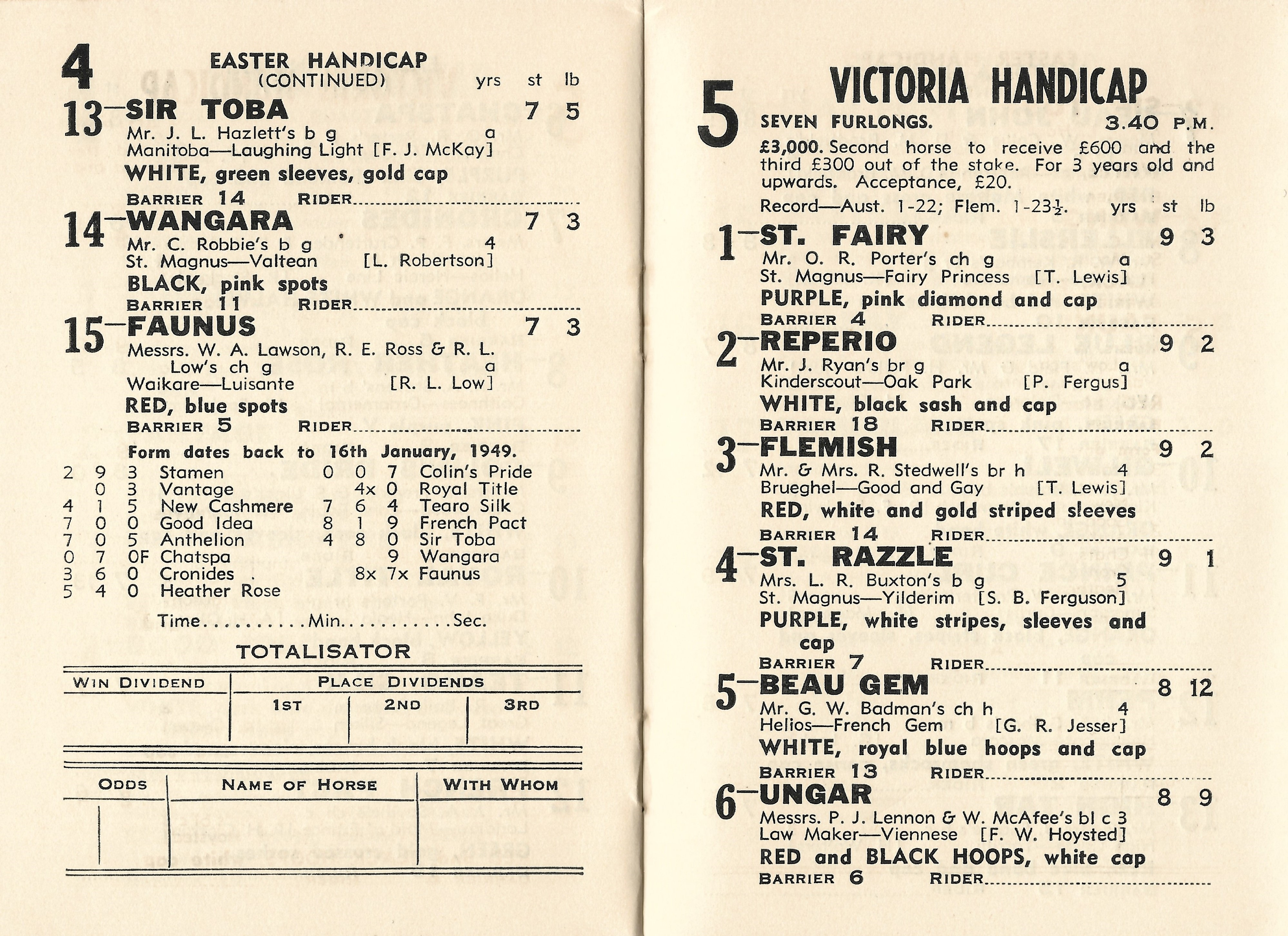
1949 MRC Victoria Handicap showing the winner, Ungar

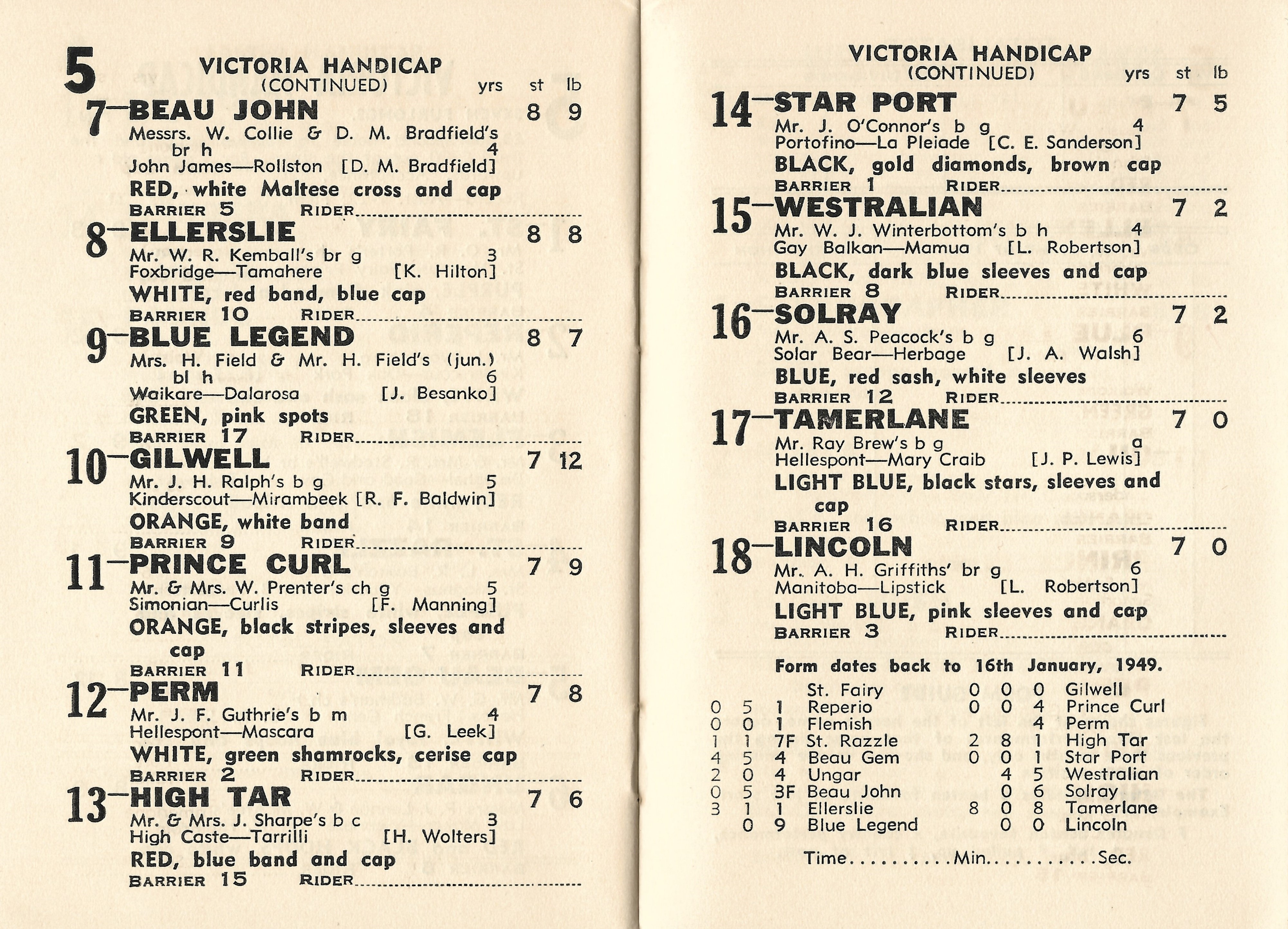
1949 MRC Victoria Handicap starters and results

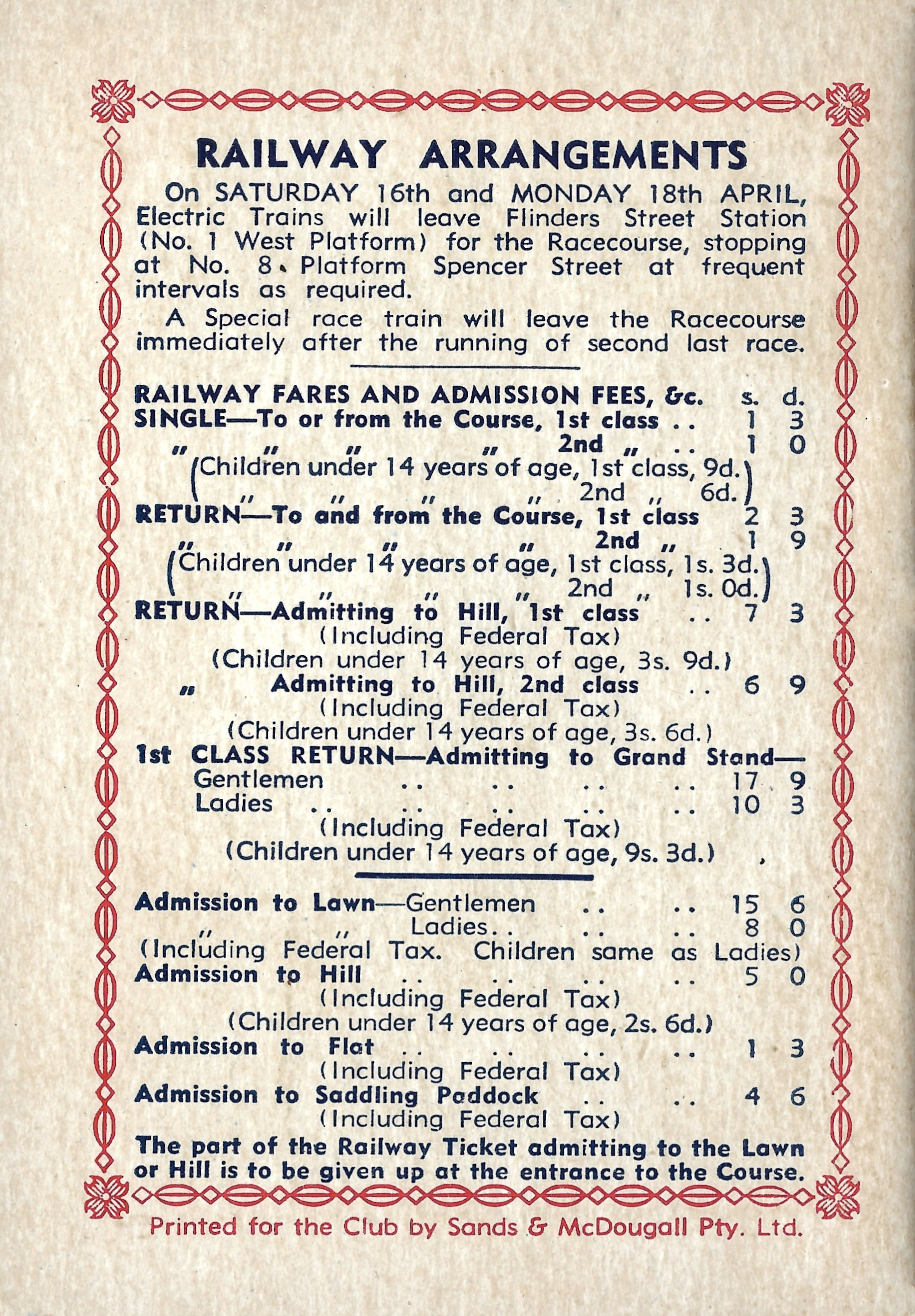
Back cover showing railway and admission charges

== Winners ==
The following are past winners of the race.

- 2026 - Hughes
- 2025 - Nicolini Vito
- 2024 - Here To Shock
- 2023 - Cardinal Gem
- 2022 - Ayrton
- 2021 - Mr Quickie
- 2020 - Bam's On Fire
- 2019 - Streets Of Avalon
- 2018 - Widgee Turf
- 2017 - Hooked
- 2016 - Black Heart Bart
- 2015 - Watermans Bay
- 2014 - Sistine Demon
- 2013 - Budriguez
- 2012 - Smokin' Joey
- 2011 - Red Colossus
- 2010 - Orbit Express
- 2009 - Masked Assassin
- 2008 - Gotta Have Heart
- 2007 - Stickpin
- 2006 - Volitant
- 2005 - Roman Arch
- 2004 - Regal Roller
- 2003 - Debrief
- 2002 - Debrief
- 2001 - Keeper
- 2000 - Go Flash Go
- 1999 - El Mirada
- 1998 - Rustic Dream
- 1997 - Lord Luskin
- 1996 - Country Lane
- 1995 - Simple As That
- 1994 - Mister Elegant
- 1993 - Surtee
- 1992 - The Fount
- 1991 - Solemn Oath
- 1990 - Prince Ormenium
- 1989 - Aisle
- 1988 - Jet Fighter
- 1987 - Jet Fighter
- 1986 - Aiming
- 1985 - Mendeara Etoile
- 1984 - Kalimna Queen
- 1983 - Hooplahannah
- 1982 - Qubeau
- 1981 - Aquatorial
- 1980 - Schaparo
- 1979 - Bit Of A Skite
- 1978 - Money Talks
- 1977 - Golden Fantasy
- 1976 - Man-A-Million
- 1975 - Kenmark
- 1974 - Cut And Deal
- 1973 - Nicopal
- 1972 - †Abdul / Count Karl
- 1971 - Romantic Son
- 1970 - Tauto
- 1969 - Abebe
- 1968 - Ammate
- 1967 - Snub
- 1966 - Kaminyarr
- 1965 - Samson
- 1964 - Nicopolis
- 1963 - Highmara
- 1962 - Webster
- 1961 - Fuss
- 1960 - Correct
- 1959 - Count Tassia
- 1958 - Lord
- 1957 - Parvo
- 1956 - Brocken
- 1955 - St. Joel
- 1954 - Burdindi
- 1953 - Pure Fire
- 1952 - Joyance
- 1951 - Savoy
- 1950 - Star Port
- 1949 - Ungar

† Dead heat

== See also ==
- Easter Cup
- List of Australian Group races
- Group races
