= Moonga Stakes =

- Class: Group 3
- Location: Caulfield Racecourse, Melbourne, Australia
- Inaugurated: 1982
- Race type: Thoroughbred - Flat racing
- Sponsor: Sportsbet (2024 & 2025)

Race information
- Distance: 1,400 metres
- Surface: Turf
- Track: Left-handed
- Qualification: Four years old and upwards
- Weight: Handicap
- Purse: $240,000 (2026)

The Moonga Stakes is a Melbourne Racing Club Group 3 Thoroughbred horse race, for four year olds and upwards, at Set Weights with penalties, over a distance of 1400 metres, held annually at Caulfield Racecourse, Melbourne, Australia in October.

== History ==
=== Name ===
- 1987–1992 - Richard Ellis Plate
- 1993–1994 - The Myer Stakes
- 1995 - Richard Ellis Plate
- 1996 - Vo Rogue Stakes (In honour of champion - Vo Rogue)
- 1997 - Tablerite Stakes
- 1998–1999 - IGA Supermarkets Stakes
- 2000 - Ansett Australia Stakes
- 2001–2002 - Melbourne Racing Club Stakes
- 2003 - Farewell To Northerly Stakes (In honour of champion - Northerly)
- 2004 - Melbourne Racing Club Stakes
- 2005–2006 - Harrolds 101 Stakes
- 2007–2008 - Jayco Cup
- 2009–2011 - Betfair Stakes
- 2012 onwards - Moonga Stakes

=== Grade ===
- 1988–1993 - Principal race
- 1994 onwards - Group 3

== Winners ==
The following are past winners of the race.

- 2026 - War Machine
- 2025 - Private eye
- 2024 - Mighty Ulysses
- 2023 - Buffalo River
- 2022 - Aegon
- 2021 - Buffalo River
- 2020 - Wild Planet
- 2019 - Streets Of Avalon
- 2018 - Sircconi
- 2017 - Ulmann
- 2016 - Voodoo Lad
- 2015 - Vashka
- 2014 - Lucky Hussler
- 2013 - Boban
- 2012 - Whateverwhenever
- 2011 - Love Conquers All
- 2010 - Rothera
- 2009 - McClintock
- 2008 - Royal Discretion
- 2007 - Lord Of The Dance
- 2006 - Perfectly Ready
- 2005 - Volitant
- 2004 - Amtrak
- 2003 - Thorn Park
- 2002 - Assertive Lad
- 2001 - Flavour
- 2000 - Cellar
- 1999 - Another Neptune
- 1998 - Buster Jones
- 1997 - Monets Cove
- 1996 - Mamzelle Pedrille
- 1995 - Royal Blue
- 1994 - Star Dancer
- 1993 - Cogitate
- 1992 - Rough Habit
- 1991 - Steineck
- 1990 - Royal Pay
- 1989 - Heavenly View
- 1988 - Vo Rogue

== See also ==
- Caulfield Classic
- Caulfield Cup
- Caulfield Sprint
- Ethereal Stakes
- The Thousand Guineas
- Tristarc Stakes
- List of Australian Group races
- Group races
