= Colette (horse) =

Australian thoroughbred racehorse

- Racing silks of Godolphin
- Sire: Hallowed Crown
- Grandsire: Street Sense
- Dam: Libretto
- Damsire: Singspiel
- Sex: Filly
- Foaled: 29 November 2016
- Country: Australia
- Colour: Bay
- Breeder: Godolphin
- Owner: Godolphin
- Trainer: James Cummings
- Record: 25: 8–5–0
- Earnings: A$ 7,138,055

Major wins
- Adrian Knox Stakes (2020); Australian Oaks (2020); Golden Eagle (2020); Apollo Stakes (2021); Tristarc Stakes (2021); Empire Rose Stakes (2021)

Colette (foaled 29 November 2016) is a retired multiple Group 1 winning Australian bred thoroughbred racehorse.

== Background ==
Home bred by Godolphin, Colette is the first stakes winner sired by dual Group 1 winner, Hallowed Crown.

== Racing career ==
=== 2019/20: three-year-old season ===
Unraced as a two-year-old, Colette made her debut at Hawkesbury Racecourse, finishing unplaced and beaten by a margin of 8 lengths. At her next two starts, Colette finished in second place on both occasions, however she won her first race at her fourth start when winning at Newcastle Racecourse by six lengths.

After a six-week break, Colette won at Kembla Grange Racecourse and two weeks later she contested her first stakes race, the Group 3, Adrian Knox Stakes at Randwick Racecourse. Starting as a 2/1 favourite, Colette settled midfield before weaving her way through runners in the first half of the home straight. She stormed to the front at the 100m and drew away win by 2-3/4 lengths.

Seven days later, Colette contested the Australian Oaks at the same course. This was her first attempt in a Group 1 race. Starting favourite at the odds of 2/1 and with Glen Boss in the saddle, Colette took the lead at the 300-metre mark over the 2,400m distance and won by 2-1/2 lengths. Trainer James Cummings said after the race, “She's got a wonderful future”.

=== 2020/21: four-year-old season ===
After a five-month break, Colette resumed racing on the 5 September 2020 at Randwick in the Tramway Stakes. Over a distance of 1,400 metres Colette started at odds of $12 in the eleven horse field. Racing on the pace throughout, Colette faded late to finish 10th beaten just over two lengths. Jockey Josh Parr was full of praise after the race stating, “Really good. I ended up closer than ideal for her. I had to chase from a long way out. She is in good shape.”

After two unplaced runs in the George Main Stakes and Epsom Handicap, Colette started at odds of $10 in the Golden Eagle raced at Rosehill Racecourse on the 31 October. Rounding the home turn she was placed 15th of 18 runners but produced a strong sprint to narrowly win the race and collect over $4 million prize money.

On the 13 February 2021, Colette resumed racing in the Apollo Stakes at Randwick over 1,400 metres. Starting at odds of $12 she settled just behind the leaders in third position throughout the run. Upon straightening she burst past her opposition to win by a margin of 2 lengths.

=== 2021/22: five-year-old season ===
In the 2021 Spring Racing Carnival, Colette recorded back-to-back wins in the Tristarc Stakes and the Empire Rose Stakes where she recorded her second career Group One victory.

In early 2022, Colette finished second in both the Apollo Stakes and the George Ryder Stakes. After finishing last in the Queen of the Turf Stakes, Colette was retired from racing to become a broodmare. At the time of her retirement, Colette was the highest earning racehorse that Godolphin has owned in Australia.

== Pedigree ==
Pedigree of Colette (AUS) 2016
Sire Hallowed Crown (AUS) 2011	Street Sense (USA); 2004	Street Cry	Machiavellian
Sire Hallowed Crown (AUS) 2011	Street Sense (USA); 2004	Street Cry	Helen Street
Sire Hallowed Crown (AUS) 2011	Street Sense (USA); 2004	Bedazzle	Dixieland Band
Sire Hallowed Crown (AUS) 2011	Street Sense (USA); 2004	Bedazzle	Majestic Legend
Sire Hallowed Crown (AUS) 2011	Crowned Glory (AUS); 1997	Danehill	Danzig
Sire Hallowed Crown (AUS) 2011	Crowned Glory (AUS); 1997	Danehill	Razyana
Sire Hallowed Crown (AUS) 2011	Crowned Glory (AUS); 1997	Significant Moment	Bletchingly
Sire Hallowed Crown (AUS) 2011	Crowned Glory (AUS); 1997	Significant Moment	Lady Giselle
Dam Libretto (IRE) 2000	Singspiel (IRE); 1992	In the Wings	Sadler's Wells
Dam Libretto (IRE) 2000	Singspiel (IRE); 1992	In the Wings	High Hawk
Dam Libretto (IRE) 2000	Singspiel (IRE); 1992	Glorious Song	Halo
Dam Libretto (IRE) 2000	Singspiel (IRE); 1992	Glorious Song	Ballade
Dam Libretto (IRE) 2000	Truly Special (IRE); 1985	Caerleon	Nijinsky II
Dam Libretto (IRE) 2000	Truly Special (IRE); 1985	Caerleon	Foreseer
Dam Libretto (IRE) 2000	Truly Special (IRE); 1985	Arctique Royale	Royal and Regal
Dam Libretto (IRE) 2000	Truly Special (IRE); 1985	Arctique Royale	Arctic Melody
