= Peter Moody =

Australian racehorse trainer

Personal information
- Born: Australia
- Occupation: Racehorse trainer

Horse racing career
- Sport: Horse racing

Racing awards
- Australian Racing Hall of Fame

Significant horses
- Amalfi, Black Caviar, Dissident, Incentivise, Typhoon Tracy, Sheza Alibi

Peter Moody is an Australian thoroughbred racehorse trainer who is notable for training over three thousand winners, including 60 Group One winners.

He was the trainer of the champion sprinter Black Caviar who was unbeaten in all of her 25 starts, including 15 Group Ones.

Moody came from Wyandra, a town in Queensland. As a teenager, he worked as a stablehand for legendary trainer T J Smith at Randwick Racecourse, Sydney. Moody took out a trainer's licence in 1998 and prepared his first winner that year with Ebony Way at Eagle Farm.

His first Group 1 winner was Amalfi in the 2001 Victoria Derby at Flemington Racecourse.

He has won four Melbourne Trainers' Premierships. He now trains in partnership with Katherine Coleman.

In 2025 Moody was inducted into the Australian Racing Hall of Fame.

== Notable horses and victories ==
- Amalfi: winner of the 2001 Victoria Derby
- Black Caviar: 1st in 2013 World's Best Racehorse Rankings and Australian Champion Racehorse of the Year (2011–2013)
- Dissident: Australian Champion Racehorse of the Year in 2014–2015, winner of the Memsie Stakes, C F Orr Stakes, Makybe Diva Stakes and All Aged Stakes.
- Flamberge: winner of the 2015 The Goodwood and in 2016 the Oakleigh Plate and William Reid Stakes
- I Wish I Win: winner of the 2022 Golden Eagle, 2023 TJ Smith Stakes and 2024 Kingsford-Smith Cup
- Incentivise: winner of the 2021 Makybe Diva Stakes, Turnbull Stakes and Caulfield Cup
- Lights of Heaven: winner of the 2011 Schweppes Australasian Oaks
- Testafiable [sic]: winner of the 2006 South Australian Derby
- Typhoon Tracy: Australian Champion Racehorse of the Year in 2009–10, winner of six Group 1 races.

== See also ==
- Thoroughbred racing in Australia
