= Success Express =

American-bred Thoroughbred racehorse

- Sire: Hold Your Peace
- Grandsire: Speak John
- Dam: Au Printemps
- Damsire: Dancing Champ
- Sex: Stallion
- Foaled: 1985
- Country: United States
- Colour: Bay
- Breeder: Tri Star Stable
- Owner: Eugene V. Klein
- Trainer: D. Wayne Lukas
- Record: 17: 4-2-4
- Earnings: $835,359

Major wins
- Breeders' Cup Juvenile (1987)
- Last updated on September 5, 2007

Success Express (foaled February 25, 1985 in Kentucky – 24 April 2015) was an American Thoroughbred racehorse.

== Background ==
Success Express was a bay horse bred by Tri Star Stable. During his racing career he was owned by Eugene V. Klein and trained by future U.S. Racing Hall of Fame inductee D. Wayne Lukas.

== Racing career ==
At age two Success Express won four of his eight starts. The colt capped off his year with his only Graded Stakes win under jockey José A. Santos in the 1987 Breeders' Cup Juvenile at Hollywood Park Racetrack. Success Express was winless in nine starts at age three with his best result a second in the Grade II Bay Shore Stakes at Aqueduct Racetrack.

== Stud career ==
In 1989, Success Express was retired to stud in Australia and spent two seasons in New Zealand between 1991 and 1993. There, he has sired multiple stakes winning millionaire, Staging, as well as Polar Success whose career earnings were more than $2 million and who was a multiple stakes winner including the Group One Golden Slipper Stakes.

== Pedigree ==
Pedigree of Success Express (USA), dark bay colt, 1985
| Sire Hold Your Peace (USA) 1969 | Speak John (USA); 1958 | Prince John (USA) | Princequillo (IRE) |
| Sire Hold Your Peace (USA) 1969 | Speak John (USA); 1958 | Prince John (USA) | Not Afraid (USA) |
| Sire Hold Your Peace (USA) 1969 | Speak John (USA); 1958 | Nuit De Folies (FRA) | Tornado (FRA) |
| Sire Hold Your Peace (USA) 1969 | Speak John (USA); 1958 | Nuit De Folies (FRA) | Folle Nuit (FRA) |
| Sire Hold Your Peace (USA) 1969 | Blue Moon (USA); 1948 | Eight Thirty (USA) | Pilate (USA) |
| Sire Hold Your Peace (USA) 1969 | Blue Moon (USA); 1948 | Eight Thirty (USA) | Dinner Time (USA) |
| Sire Hold Your Peace (USA) 1969 | Blue Moon (USA); 1948 | Blue Grail (USA) | Blue Larkspur (USA) |
| Sire Hold Your Peace (USA) 1969 | Blue Moon (USA); 1948 | Blue Grail (USA) | Ample (USA) |
| Dam Au Printemps (USA) 1979 | Dancing Champ (USA); 1972 | Nijinsky (CAN) | Northern Dancer (CAN) |
| Dam Au Printemps (USA) 1979 | Dancing Champ (USA); 1972 | Nijinsky (CAN) | Flaming Page (CAN) |
| Dam Au Printemps (USA) 1979 | Dancing Champ (USA); 1972 | Mrs. Peterkin (USA) | Tom Fool (USA) |
| Dam Au Printemps (USA) 1979 | Dancing Champ (USA); 1972 | Mrs. Peterkin (USA) | Legendra (USA) |
| Dam Au Printemps (USA) 1979 | Lorgnette (IRE); 1964 | High Hat (GB) | Hyperion (GB) |
| Dam Au Printemps (USA) 1979 | Lorgnette (IRE); 1964 | High Hat (GB) | Madonna (GB) |
| Dam Au Printemps (USA) 1979 | Lorgnette (IRE); 1964 | Mlle. Lorette (USA) | Lovely Night (USA) |
| Dam Au Printemps (USA) 1979 | Lorgnette (IRE); 1964 | Mlle. Lorette (USA) | Gallorette (USA) |
