= 1979 Melbourne Cup =

Edition of the Melbourne Cup

- Melbourne Cup
- Location: Flemington Racecourse
- Date: 5 Nov 1979
- Distance: 3200m
- Winning horse: Hyperno
- Winning time: 3:21.8
- Final odds: 7/1
- Jockey: Harry White
- Trainer: Bart Cummings
- Owner: Sir Thomas & Lady North, Mr & Mrs George Herscu & Dr Ray Lake
- Conditions: Fast
- Surface: Turf

"Tackled by Red Nose, Salamander and on the outside is Hyperno, here's Cubacade with a powerful run from Warri Symbol. It's Red Nose and Salamander together at the 200, on the outside Hyperno and Salamander going stride for stride from Red Nose. Salamander a head in front, Hyperno's grabbing him, they go to the post together... Hyperno if anything's won it a nose to Salamander!"

— Commentator Bill Collins describes the climax of the race

The 1979 Melbourne Cup was a handicap horse race which took place on Tuesday, 5 November 1979 over 3200m, at Flemington Racecourse.

The race was won by the New Zealand bred gelding Hyperno, trained by Bart Cummings and ridden by Harry White. The runner up was Salamander trained by T J Hughes, and third place went to Red Nose trained by T Green. The winning margin was a short half head with a further one and three quarter lengths to third place.

During the race Hyperno collided with the champion racehorse Dulcify, who was put down following the race.

== Background ==
Hyperno was bred in New Zealand by Fairdale Stud, sired by Rangong (GB) and his dam was Mikarla (NZ) by Persian Garden II (GB). Hyperno had placed third in the 1977 Melbourne Cup when trained by Geoff Murphy and ridden by Brian Andrews. In 1977 he won the Newcastle Gold Cup and in 1978 The BMW Stakes and C F Orr Stakes. He also won the VRC Queen Elizabeth Stakes in 1979 and 1980, Blamey Stakes in 1980 and 1981 as well as the Australian Cup and Rawson Stakes in 1981.

The 1979 Cup gave Bart Cummings his seventh Melbourne Cup win. Bart went on to record twelve Melbourne Cup training victories.

Harry White's winning ride was his fourth Melbourne Cup victory, the others being on Think Big in 1974 and 1975 and Arwon for George Hanlon in 1978.

== Field ==
The following contested the 1979 Melbourne Cup.

Place	Number	Horse	Weight (kg)	Odds	Trainer	Jockey
1st	2	Hyperno	56	7-1	Bart Cummings	Harry White
2nd	4	Salamander	55.5	10-1	Tom Hughes	Roy Higgins
3rd	12	Red Nose (NZ)	51.5	16-1	Theo Green	Midge Didham
4th	14	Hauberk	51	40-1	R E Hoystead	P Jarman
5th	6	Cubacade	52	13-2	D N Couchman	J Walker
6th	9	Warri Symbol	52	6-1	J J Moloney	P Hyland
7th	20	Karu	49	12-1	J Holme	W Robinson
8th	11	Magistrate	51.5	16-1	I F Steffert	Bob Skelton
9th	5	Kankama	54.5	50-1	M T Sullivan	John Stocker
10th	13	Earthquake McGoon	51	25-1	G Murphy	Gary Willetts
11th	16	Sarfraz	50.5	66-1	J J Moloney	A Trevena
12th	23	Pigalle	47.5	20-1	G Murphy	B Clements
13th	21	Love Bandit	48.5	40-1	T J Hughes	G Palmer
14th	24	Jessephenie	47	200-1	L T Dixon	S Burridge
15th	17	Somerset Nile	50	50-1	C J Honeychurch	R Selkrig
16th	15	Over The Ocean	51	100-1	T J Smith	W Treloar
17th	18	Iko	49.5	33-1	T J Smith	M Johnston
18th	10	Gunderman	51.5	80-1	T R Howe	R Heffernan
19th	19	Licence Fee	49.5	160-1	T J Harrison	A Williams
20th	8	Rough 'n' Tough	52	66-1	T J Millard	G Murphy
21st	22	Safe Harbour	49.5	100-1	Bart Cummings	K Langby
DNF	1	Dulcify	56	3-1	C S Hayes	B Thomson
Scratch	3	Panamint				
Scratch	7	Pierre's Order (NZ)				
