= Van der Hum =

New Zealand-bred Thoroughbred racehorse

Van der Hum (NZ)
- Sire: Hermes (GB)
- Grandsire: Aureole
- Dam: Tip O'Dawn (NZ)
- Damsire: Count Rendered (GB)
- Sex: Gelding
- Foaled: 1971
- Died: 2001
- Country: New Zealand
- Colour: Chestnut
- Owner: Messrs Leo H & Roy A Robinson & E L G Abel
- Trainer: Leo H and Roy Robinson
- Earnings: $235,020

Major wins
- Melbourne Cup (1976)
- Last updated on 25 May 2009

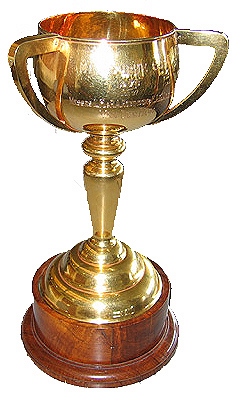
The 1976 cup that was won by Van Der Hum

Van der Hum (31 July 1971 – 27 July 2001) was a New Zealand thoroughbred racehorse, who won the 1976 Melbourne Cup when ridden by Bob Skelton.

He was sired by the stayer and sire of the winners of over $2m, Hermes (GB), his dam Tip O'Dawn was by the good sire Count Rendered (GB).

== Flat racing career ==
In 1976 Van der Hum won 10 races in New Zealand over distances ranging from 1600m to 2200m. Heading to Australia he won the 2400m Herbert Power Handicap on 9 October 1976 from Demerara on a slow track. He then ran 3rd behind How Now in the Caulfield Cup on a heavy track, ridden by Brent Thomson.

With Bob Skelton aboard he was then 8th, out of 14, behind the three-year-old New Zealand-bred filly Surround in the Cox Plate on a fast track.

The favourite for the 1976 Melbourne Cup was the Bart Cummings trained local Gold and Black. On cup day there was a very heavy downpour on the course and Van Der Hum, a wet track specialist, beat Gold and Black into second place. Trainer and part owner Leo Robinson had spent two nights prior to the 1976 Melbourne Cup in his car, armed with a shotgun, outside Van Der Hum’s stall.

He was unplaced in his next two Australian starts on better tracks before returning to New Zealand.

In 1977 he returned to Australia with a 6th behind Family of Man in the 2000m Caulfield Stakes and 10th behind Ming Dynasty in the Caulfield Cup. Van der Hum was ridden again by Bob Skelton when placed 10th in the 1977 Melbourne Cup which was won by the "Cups King", Bart Cummings, with Gold and Black from Reckless and Hyperno. However, Van Der Hum followed up 4 days later with a 2nd at Flemington in the 2500m CB Fisher Plate behind Tom's Mate.

Upon returning to New Zealand he continued to race over distance on the flat but without winning.

== Jumping career ==
He then embarked on a jumping career and won the 1981 Rodmore Hurdle at Riccarton (2550m), and in 1982 the Waikato Hurdle (3200m) and Hawkes Bay Hurdle (3100m). He was placed 6th in the 1982 Great Northern Hurdles over 4190m.

Also adept over the larger fences he won the 1983 Rangitikei Steeplechase and 1984 Egmont Steeplechase at Waverley, both over 4400m.

Van der Hum was euthanized on 27 July 2001, four days short of his 30th birthday.

== See also ==
- Thoroughbred racing in New Zealand
