= Gold and Black =

New Zealand-bred Thoroughbred racehorse

- Sire: In the Purple
- Grandsire: Right Royal
- Dam: Gem
- Damsire: Talismano
- Sex: Gelding
- Foaled: 1972
- Died: 1999
- Country: New Zealand
- Colour: Brown
- Breeder: M. R. Renton
- Owner: Jack Harris
- Trainer: Bart Cummings

Major wins
- STC Cup (1976); Mackinnon Stakes (1976); Melbourne Cup (1977)

Gold and Black (1972−1999) was a New Zealand-bred racehorse which was ridden by John Duggan to win the 1977 Melbourne Cup for the "Cups King" Bart Cummings.

Bart Cummings bought the horse for $4,000 in New Zealand for his Adelaide clients, Jack and Mary Harris and brought in Hugh and Gloria Gage from Sydney as partners. Gold and Black was sired by In The Purple (France) and his dam was Gem (by Talismano). He was 3rd in the 1975 Victoria Derby behind Galena Boy and Romantic Archer. In December that year he won the Randwick Stakes over 2000m.

In September 1976, Gold and Black won the Hilton Handicap (Morphettville, 1850m) and STC Cup (Rosehill, 2400m) and in October the Mackinnon Stakes before finishing second to Van der Hum in the 1976 Melbourne Cup.

In early 1977, Gold and Black fell seriously ill with "travel fatigue" and his life was briefly in danger but Cummings restored the horse to health for his spring campaign. At Flemington in November Gold and Black started 7/2 favourite for the Cup after placing second in the Mackinnon Stakes behind Sir Silver Lad. Carrying a weight of 57kg he won by a length from the Australian horse Reckless with Hyperno in third. His victory gave Cummings a record sixth win in the race.

After retiring from racing Gold and Black became a Clerk Of the Course horse on South Australian tracks and was buried at the Gawler race course.
