= 1977 Melbourne Cup =

Edition of the Melbourne Cup

- Melbourne Cup
- Location: Flemington Racecourse
- Date: 1 Nov 1977
- Distance: 3200m
- Winning horse: Gold and Black
- Winning time: 3:18.4
- Final odds: 7/2
- Jockey: John Duggan
- Trainer: Bart Cummings
- Owner: Mr Jack & Mrs Mary Harris, Mr Hugh & Mrs Gloria Gage
- Conditions: Fast
- Surface: Turf

"Reckless is trying to follow him but Gold and Black swept to the lead with 300 to go in the Cup, Reckless is going to be the challenger. Gold and Black in front from Reckless out after him from Hyperno and Unaware. Reckless tackling Gold and Black, Gold and Black a neck in front, Reckless is pegging him back but Gold and Black hanging onto the lead and it's the favourite's Cup! Gold and Black won it a half length to Reckless."

— Commentator Bill Collins describes the climax of the race

The 1977 Melbourne Cup was a handicap horse race which took place on Tuesday, 1 November 1977 over 3200m, at Flemington Racecourse.

== Background ==
The race was won by the New Zealand bred gelding Gold and Black, trained by Bart Cummings and ridden by John Duggan.

The runner up was Reckless trained by Tommy Woodcock who won the 1977 Adelaide Cup, Sydney Cup and Brisbane Cup.

Third place went to Hyperno trained by Geoff Murphy. The winning margin was a length with a further two and a half lengths to third place.

Bart bought the horse in New Zealand for $4,000 for Jack and Mary Harris from Adelaide and brought in Hugh and Gloria Gage from Sydney as partners. Gold and Black was sired by In The Purple (France) and his dam was Gem (by Talismano). Gold and Black had won the 1976 Mackinnon Stakes and placed second to Van der Hum in the 1976 Melbourne Cup. In 1977 he was second to Reckless in the Sydney Cup and second in the Mackinnon Stakes behind Sir Silver Lad.

This win gave Bart Cummings his sixth Melbourne Cup win. Bart went on to record twelve Melbourne Cup training victories.

It was third time lucky for jockey John Duggan who had been runner up in the 1975 and 1976 Cups on Holiday Waggon and Gold and Black respectively.

== Field ==
The following are the placegetters in the 1977 Melbourne Cup.

Place	Horse	Weight (kg)	Trainer	Jockey
1st	Gold and Black	57	Bart Cummings	John Duggan
2nd	Reckless	56.5	Tommy Woodcock	Pat Trotter
3rd	Hyperno	52	Geoff Murphy	Brian Andrews
