= Sydeston =

Australian-bred Thoroughbred racehorse

- Sire: St Briavels
- Dam: Convatrice
- Sex: Gelding
- Foaled: 8 September 1985
- Country: Australia
- Colour: Bay
- Trainer: Bob Hoysted
- Record: 65:19-7-10
- Earnings: 3,105,545

Major wins
- Moonee Valley Cup (1989); Sandown Cup (1989); Mercedes Classic (1990); Queen Elizabeth Stakes (1990); J J Liston Stakes (1990); Caulfield Stakes (1990); Caulfield Cup (1990); St George Stakes (1991)

Honours
- Australian Racing Hall of Fame

Sydeston (foaled 8 September 1985) was one of the best racehorses to come out of Tasmania in the history of Australian racing, and easily the best to do so in the modern era. After winning a number of races in his home state, the plain brown gelding was transferred to Bob Hoysted in the middle of 1989.

Over the next 18 months, his wins included the Caulfield, Moonee Valley, and Sandown Cups, under handicap conditions, and the BMW International, the Queen Elizabeth Stakes, and the Caulfield Stakes at weight-for-age. Sydeston was adept in all conditions, and regularly raced with Vo Rogue, Super Impose, Better Loosen Up, The Phantom, Kingston Rule and Shaftesbury Avenue.

Sydeston died in 2015.
