= Bob Hoysted =

Australian racehorse trainer

Robert Edward Hoysted AM
- Born: 8 June 1925
- Died: 9 May 2014 (aged 88)
- Occupation: Racehorse trainer
- Known for: Training Manikato
- Awards: Member of the Order of Australia (1993); Inductee, Australian Racing Hall of Fame (2008)

Robert Edward Hoysted AM (8 June 1925 – 9 May 2014) was an Australian racehorse trainer, best known for training the renowned sprinter Manikato.

Hoysted was a member of an Australian racing dynasty, with his father Fred "Father" Hoysted and brother Bon Hoysted also trainers. Bob and Bon assisted Father, who was seriously ill, with preparation of 1954 Melbourne Cup-winner Rising Fast. Bob acquired his own trainers licence in 1956.

As well as Manikato, Hoysted also trained:

- Aare, winner of the 1980 Blue Diamond Stakes
- Love A Show, winner of the 1983 Blue Diamond Stakes
- Love Bandit, third placed in the 1980 Melbourne Cup
- Rose of Kingston, winner of the 1981 Champagne Stakes (ATC), Coolmore Stud Stakes, Crown Oaks, and 1982 Australasian Oaks, Australian Derby, Coongy Handicap and Craiglee Stakes
- Sydeston, winner of the 1989 Moonee Valley Cup, Sandown Cup and 1990 Tancred International Stakes, Queen Elizabeth Stakes (ATC), J J Liston Stakes, Caulfield Stakes and Caulfield Cup and 1991 St George Stakes.

Hoysted was a "driving force" behind the Australian Trainers Association (ATA), serving as federal president for over quarter of a century.

He was appointed a Member of the Order of Australia in 1993 for "service to racehorse training and to the industrial welfare of trainers" and was inducted into the Australian Racing Hall of Fame in 2008. After retiring as a trainer, Hoysted retired to the regional Victorian city of Castlemaine.

During World War II, Hoysted served in the Royal Australian Navy and was present on HMAS Warramunga in Tokyo Bay during the signing of the Japanese Instrument of Surrender on 2 September 1945.
