= Perfect Promise =

South African-bred Thoroughbred racehorse

Perfect Promise (foaled 20 September 1999), sired by Caesour out of Meretricious, is a South African thoroughbred race mare who raced in Australia. On 11 February 2006, she claimed her first Australian Group One victory by winning the C F Orr Stakes at Caulfield Racecourse, Melbourne. She was bred by Heinrich Winterbach at Varsfontein Stud in the Western Cape, and sold to and raced by Peter Cowley during her South African career. Perfect Promise won the Cape Fillies Guineas Gr 1, the Diana Stakes Gr 3 and was 2nd in the Fancourt Stakes Gr 1. Her younger full sister was Irridescene who raced for Team Valour and won the Queen Elizabeth II Cup Gr1 in Hong Kong.
