= C F Orr Stakes =

Horse race in Melbourne, Victoria, Australia

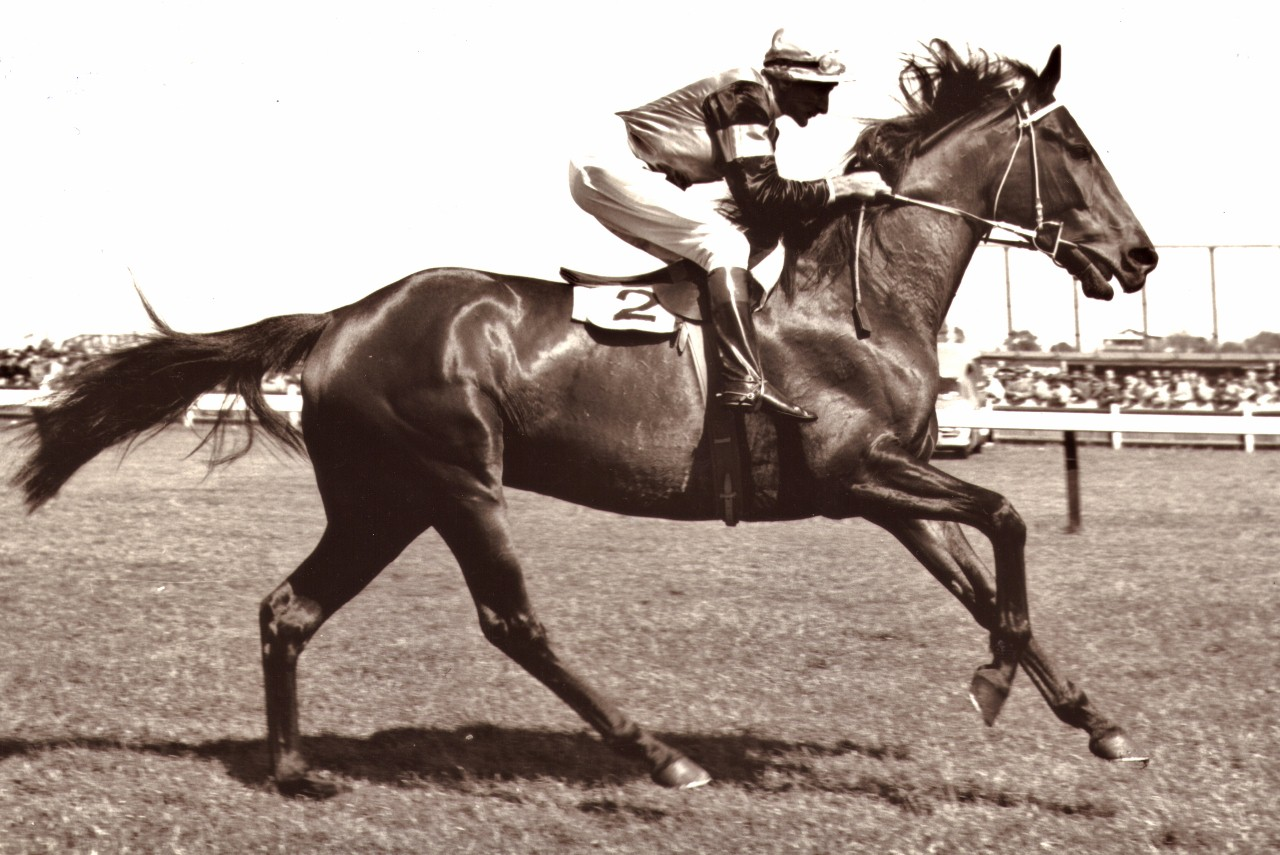
- Rising Fast, 1956 winner
- Class: Group 1
- Location: Caulfield Racecourse, Sandown Racecourse,
- Inaugurated: 1925
- Race type: Thoroughbred
- Sponsor: Sportsbet (2025 & 2026)

Race information
- Distance: 1,400 metres
- Surface: Turf
- Track: Left-handed
- Qualification: Open
- Weight: Weight for age
- Purse: $1,000,000 (2026)

The C F Orr Stakes is a Melbourne Racing Club Group 1 Thoroughbred horse race at Weight for Age, run over a distance of 1400 metres at Caulfield Racecourse, Melbourne, Victoria, Australia in November.

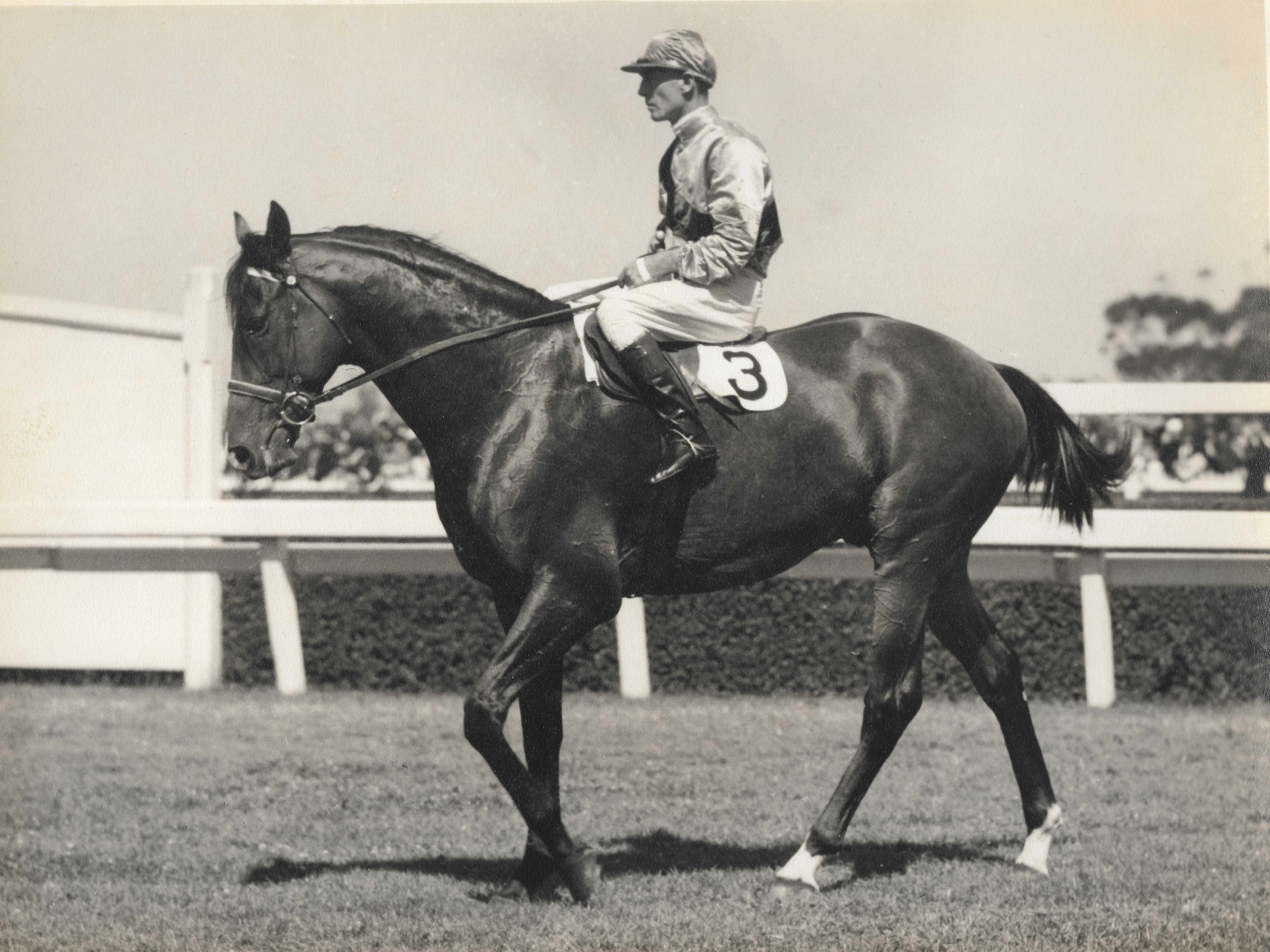
High Caste, 1940 winner

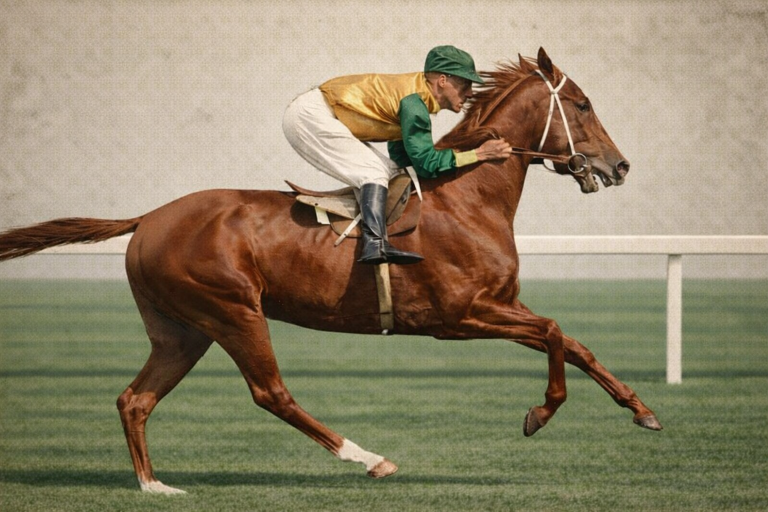
Heroic, 1927 winner

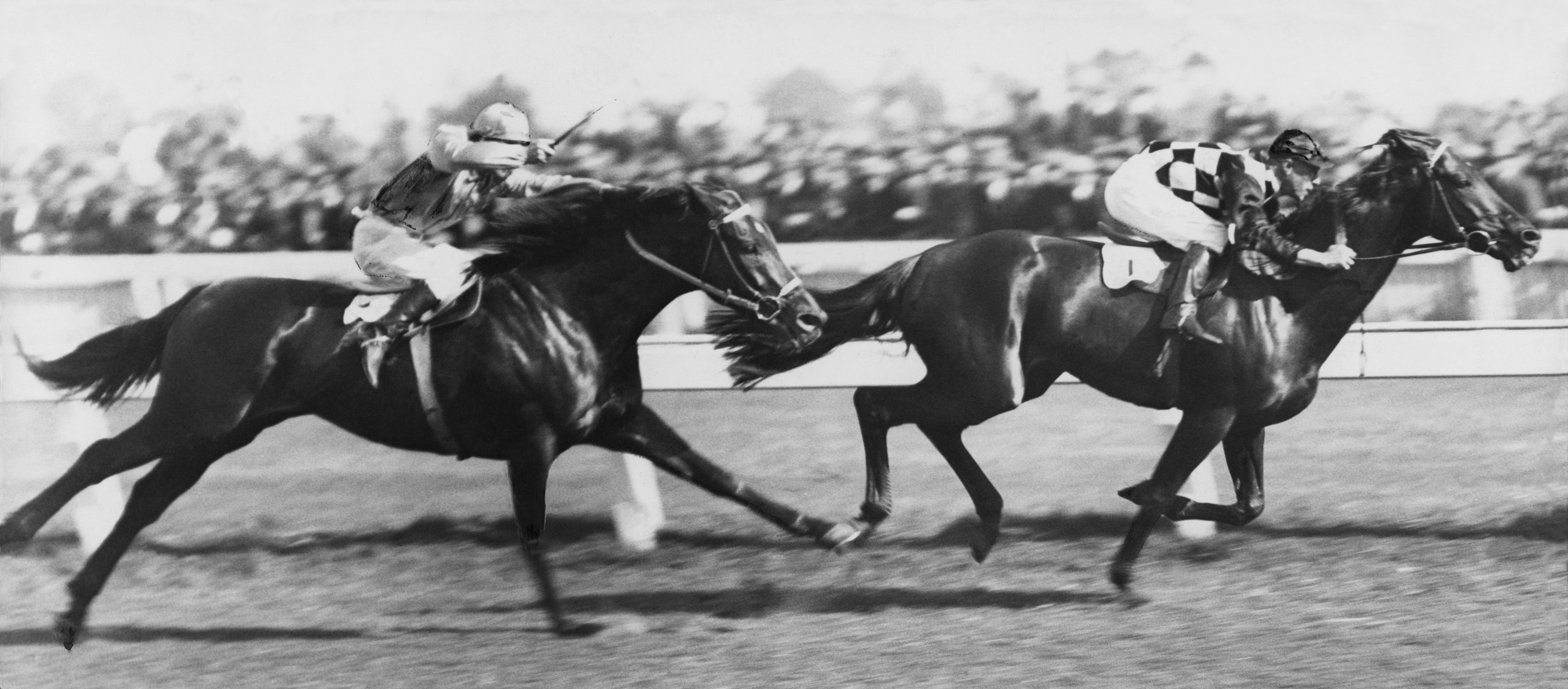
Gothic, 1929 winner

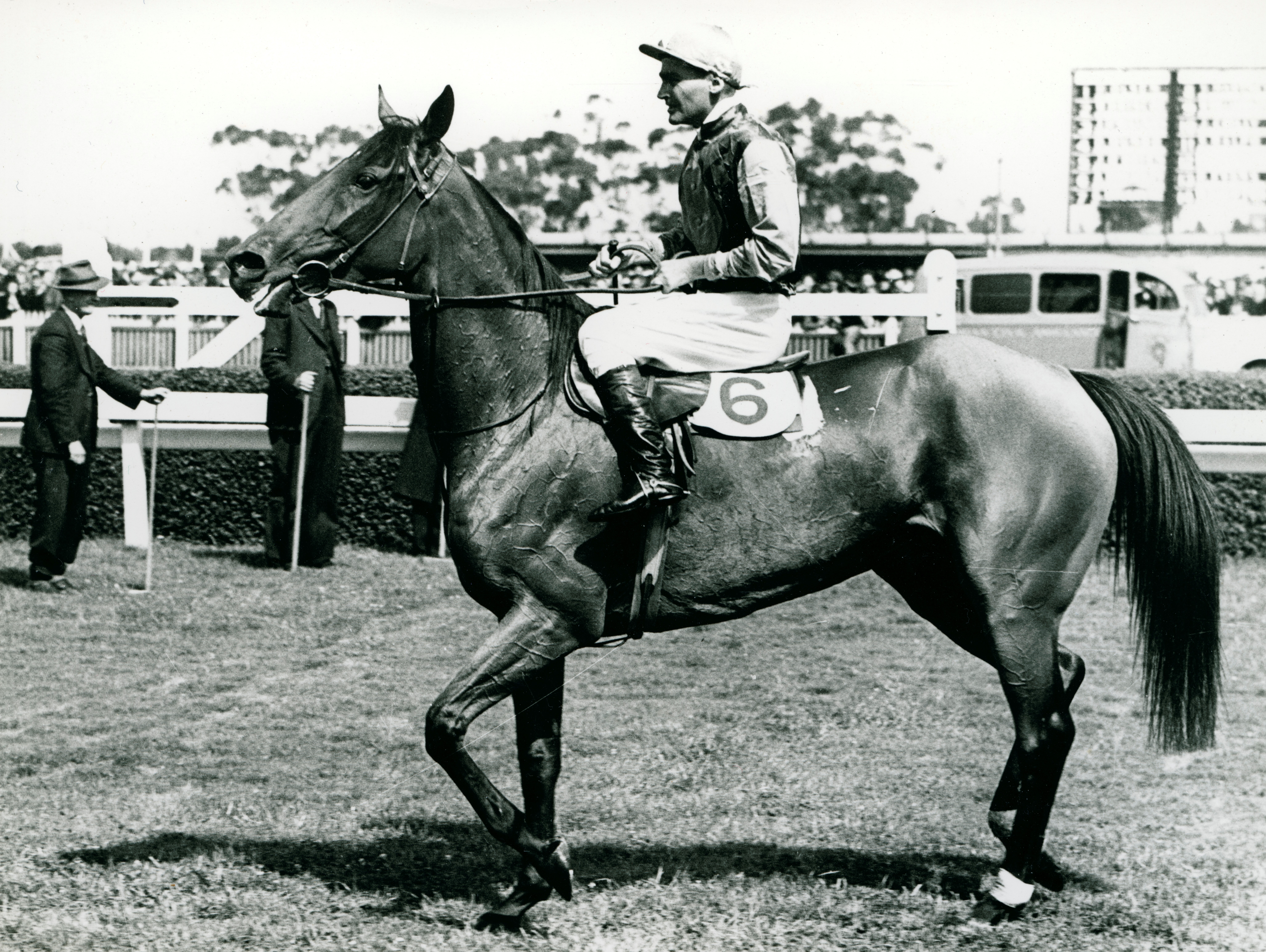
Flight, 1946 winner

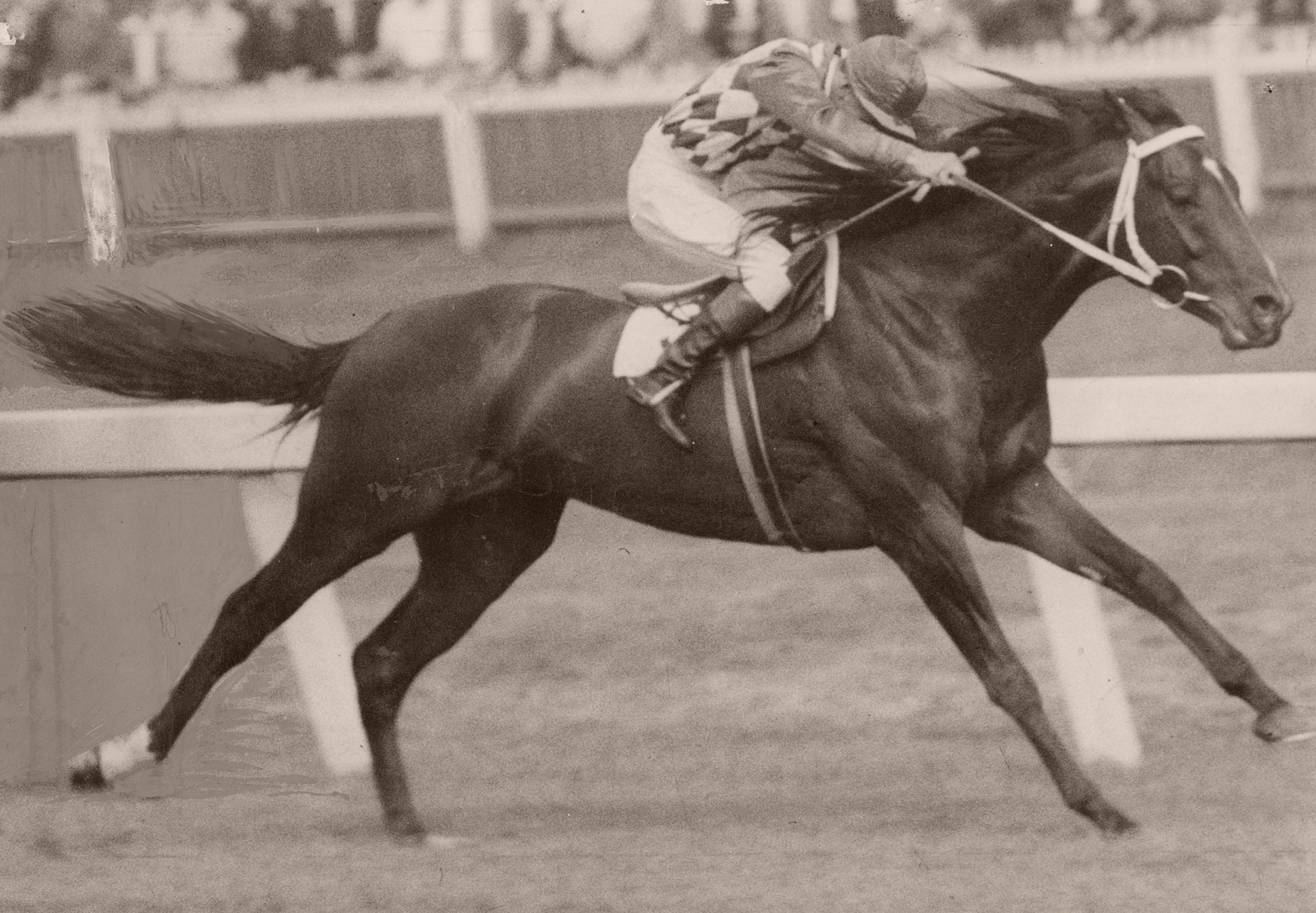
Comic Court, 1951 winner

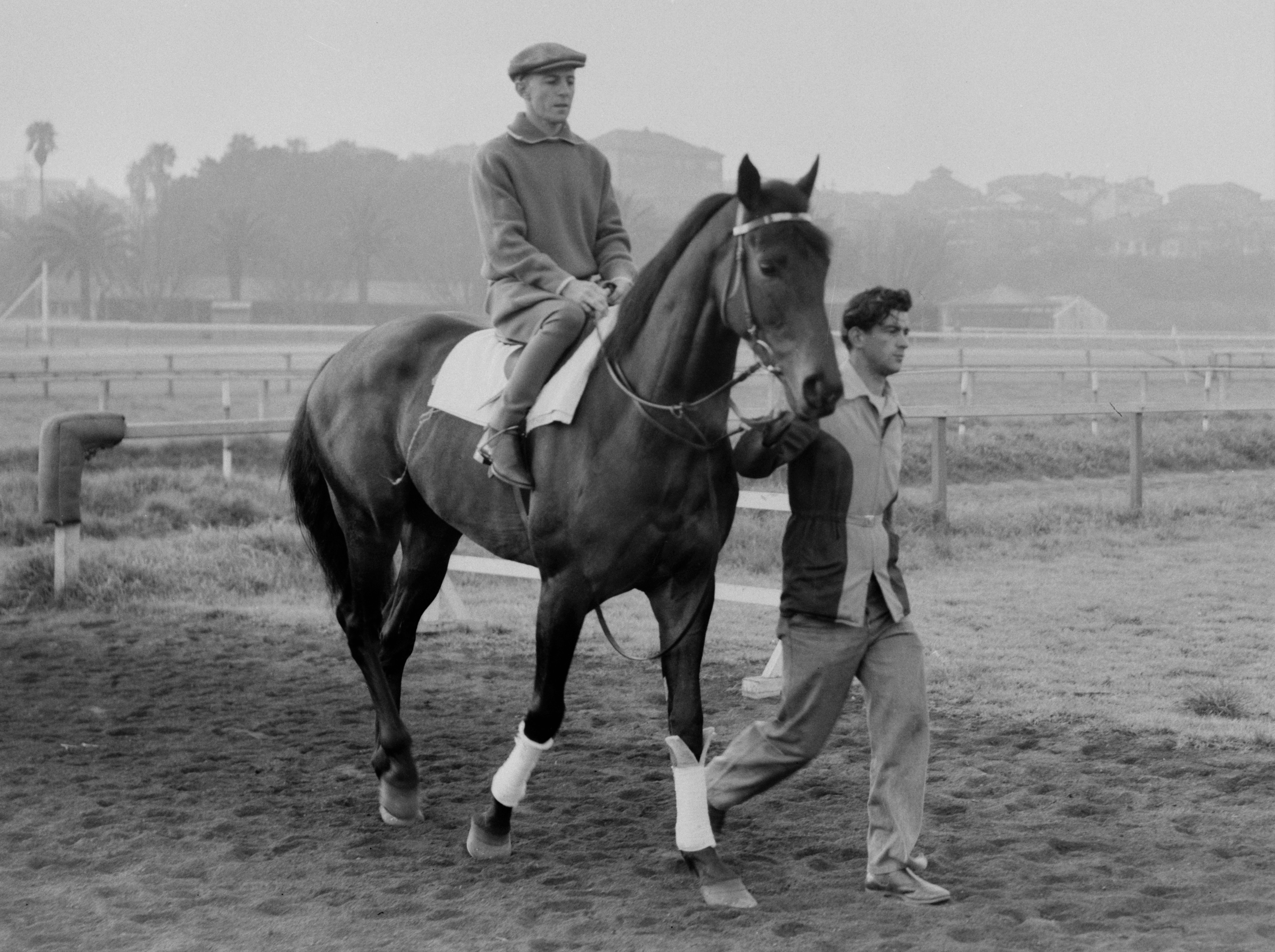
Prince Cortauld, 1955 winner

== History ==
The race is named in honour of Charles F. Orr, a former chairman and secretary of the Williamstown Racing Club. The race was originally run at the now-defunct Williamstown Racecourse. It has also been held at various times at Moonee Valley Racecourse, Flemington Racecourse and Sandown Racecourse.

The race was previously held in February when it attracted the best horses in Australia, as they started their autumn campaigns. In 2025 it was moved to November.

=== Distance ===
- 1925–1956 - 1 mile (~1600m)
- 1957–1960 - 7 furlongs (~1400m)
- 1961–1963 - 1 mile (~1600m)
- 1964–1972 - 7 furlongs (~1400m)
- 1973 onwards - 1400 metres

=== Grade ===
- 1925–1978 - Principal Race
- 1979–1992 - Group 2
- 1993 onwards Group 1

=== Venue ===
- 1925–1940 - Williamstown Racecourse
- 1941–1942 - Moonee Valley Racecourse
- 1943 - Flemington Racecourse
- 1944 - Moonee Valley Racecourse
- 1945 - Flemington Racecourse
- 1946–1948 - Moonee Valley Racecourse
- 1949–1965 - Caulfield Racecourse
- 1966–1985 - Sandown Racecourse
- 1986 - Caulfield Racecourse
- 1987–1996 - Sandown Racecourse
- 1997–2022 - Caulfield Racecourse
- 2023 - Sandown Racecourse
- 2024–2025 - Caulfield Racecourse
- 2026 - Sandown Racecourse

=== Conditions ===
- 1925–1942 - WFA with penalties
- 1943–1945 - handicap conditions
- 1946 onwards - WFA

=== 1949 racebook ===
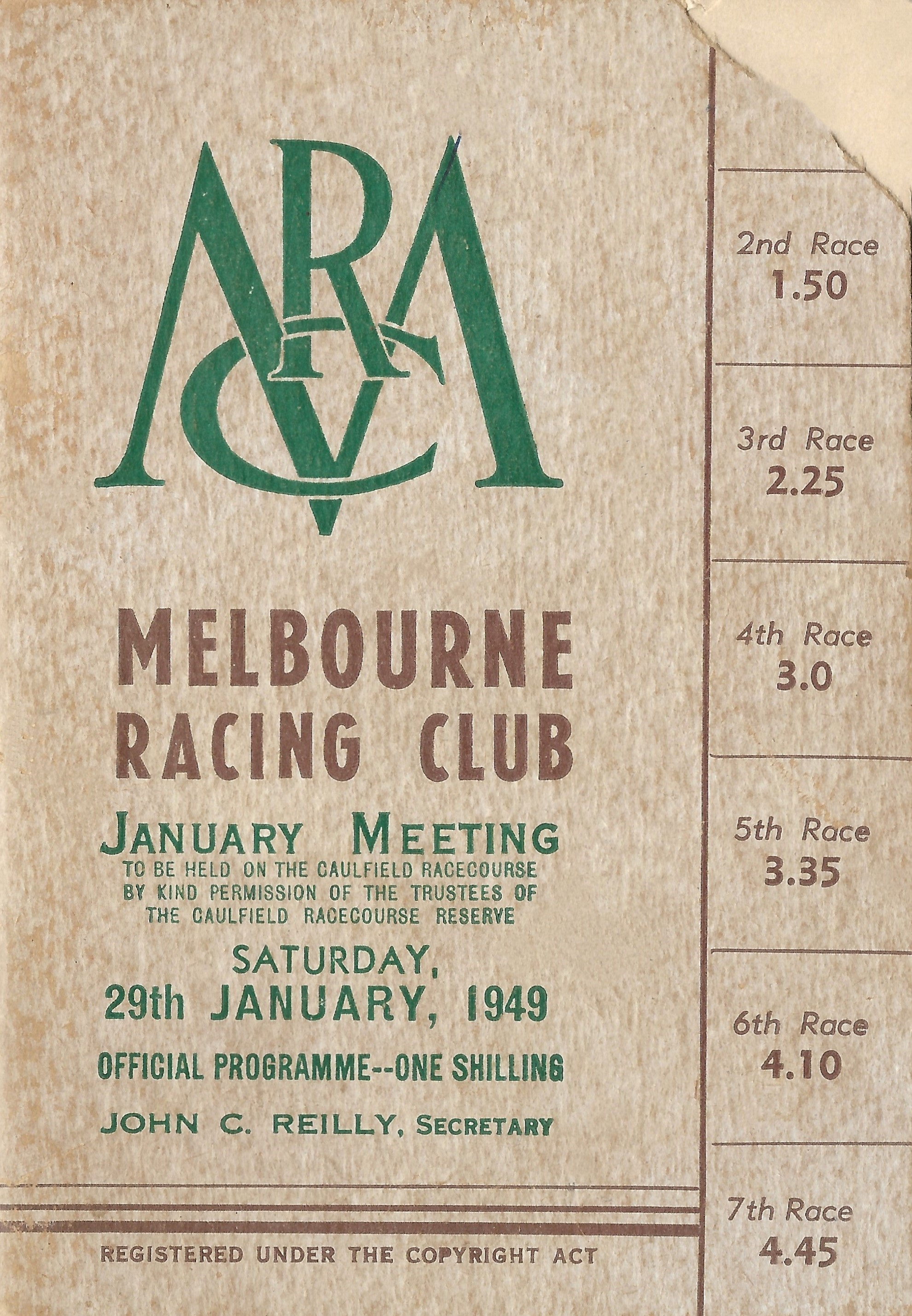
1949 MRC C F Orr Stakes racebook front cover

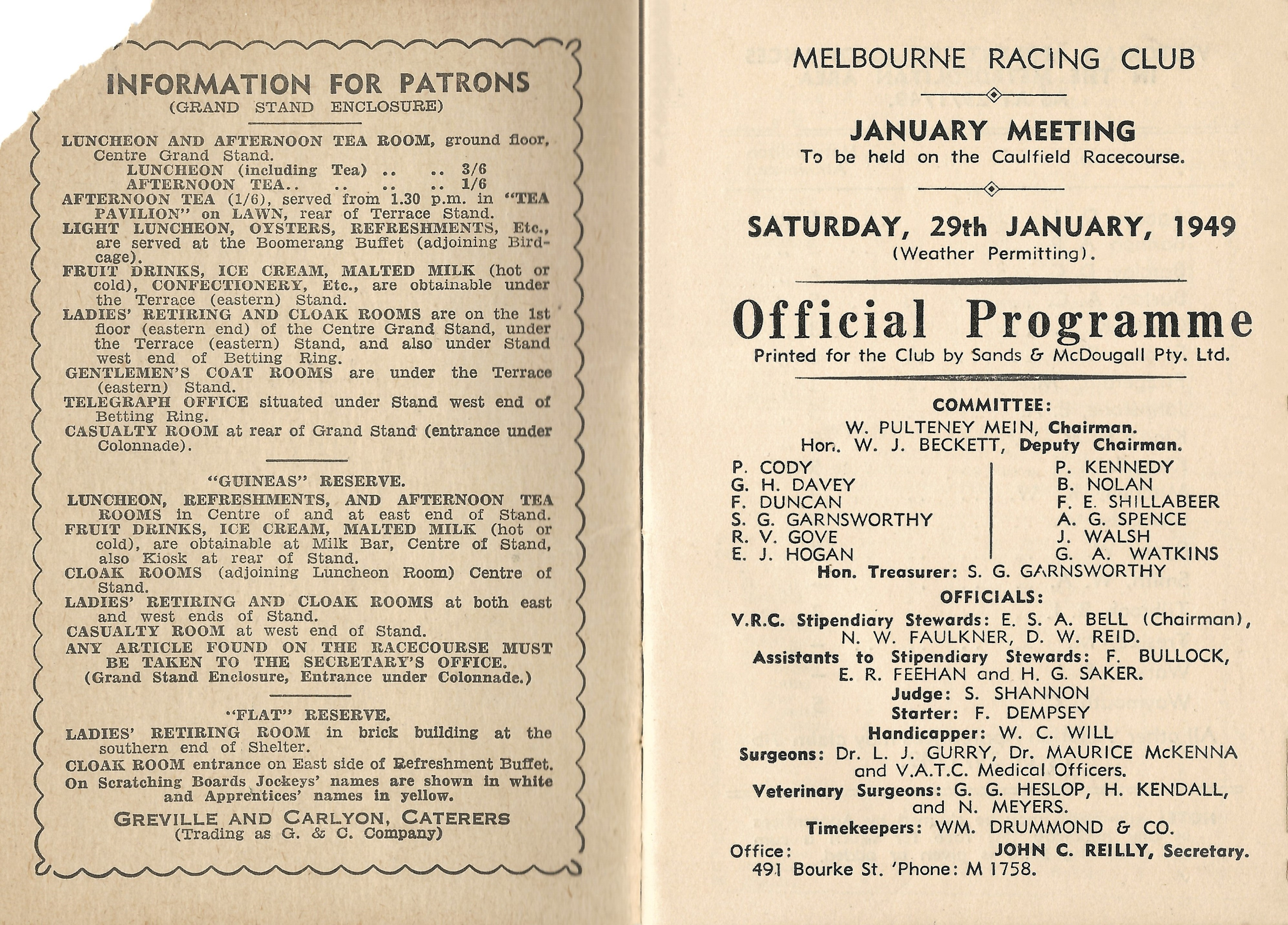
1949 MRC C F Orr Stakes raceday officials

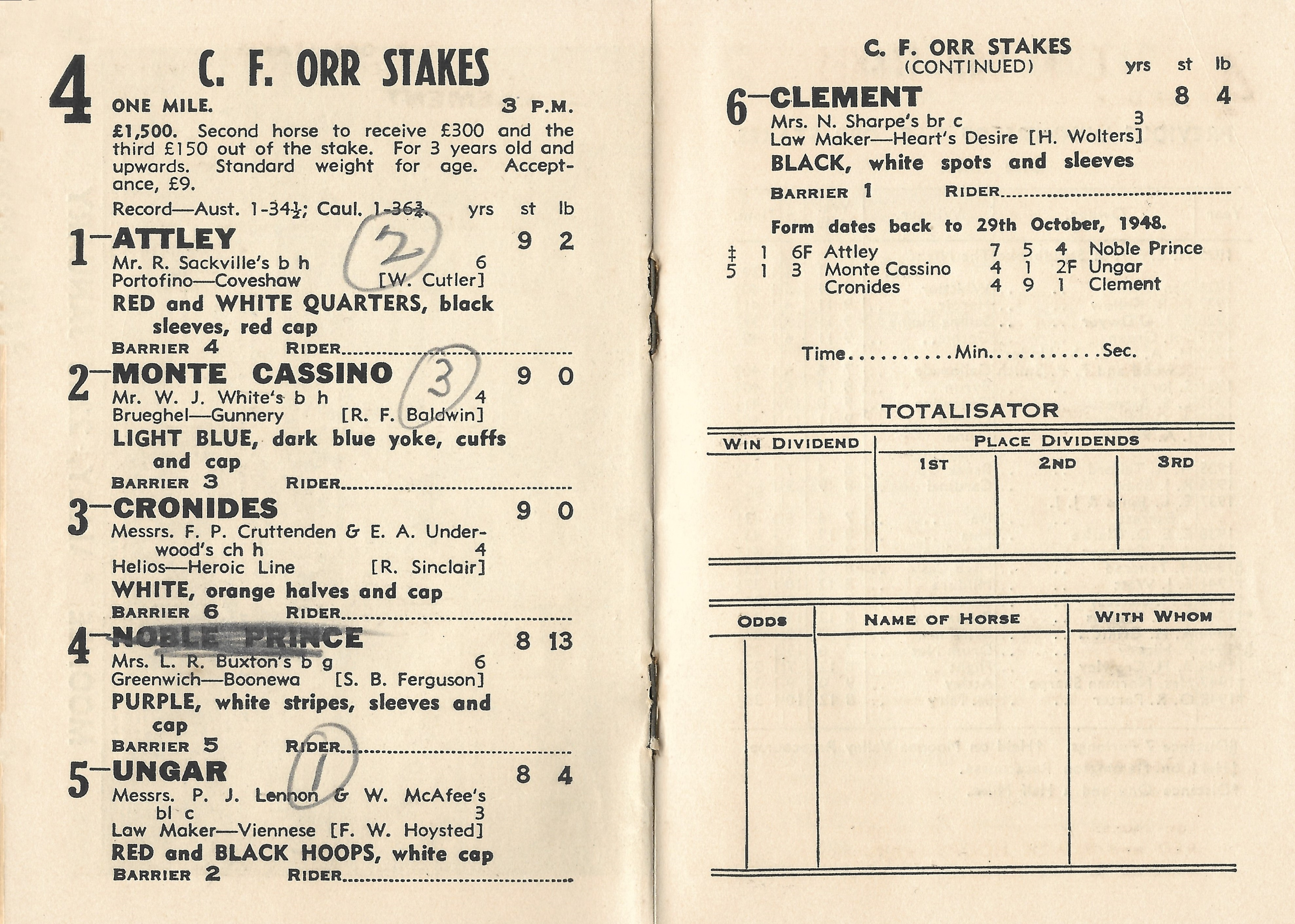
1949 MRC C F Orr Stakes starters and results showing the winner, Ungar

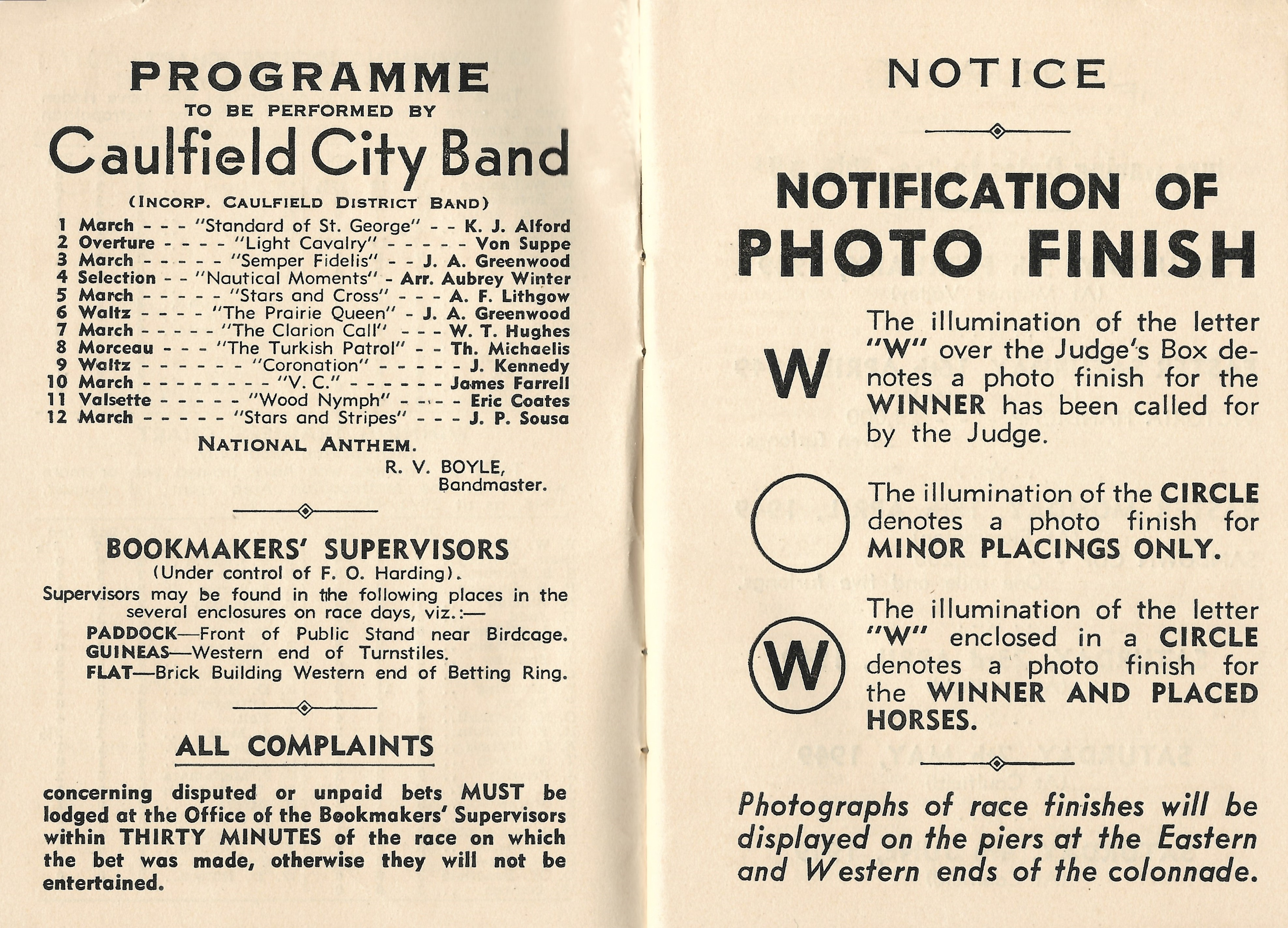
1949 MRC C F Orr Stakes showing raceday notices

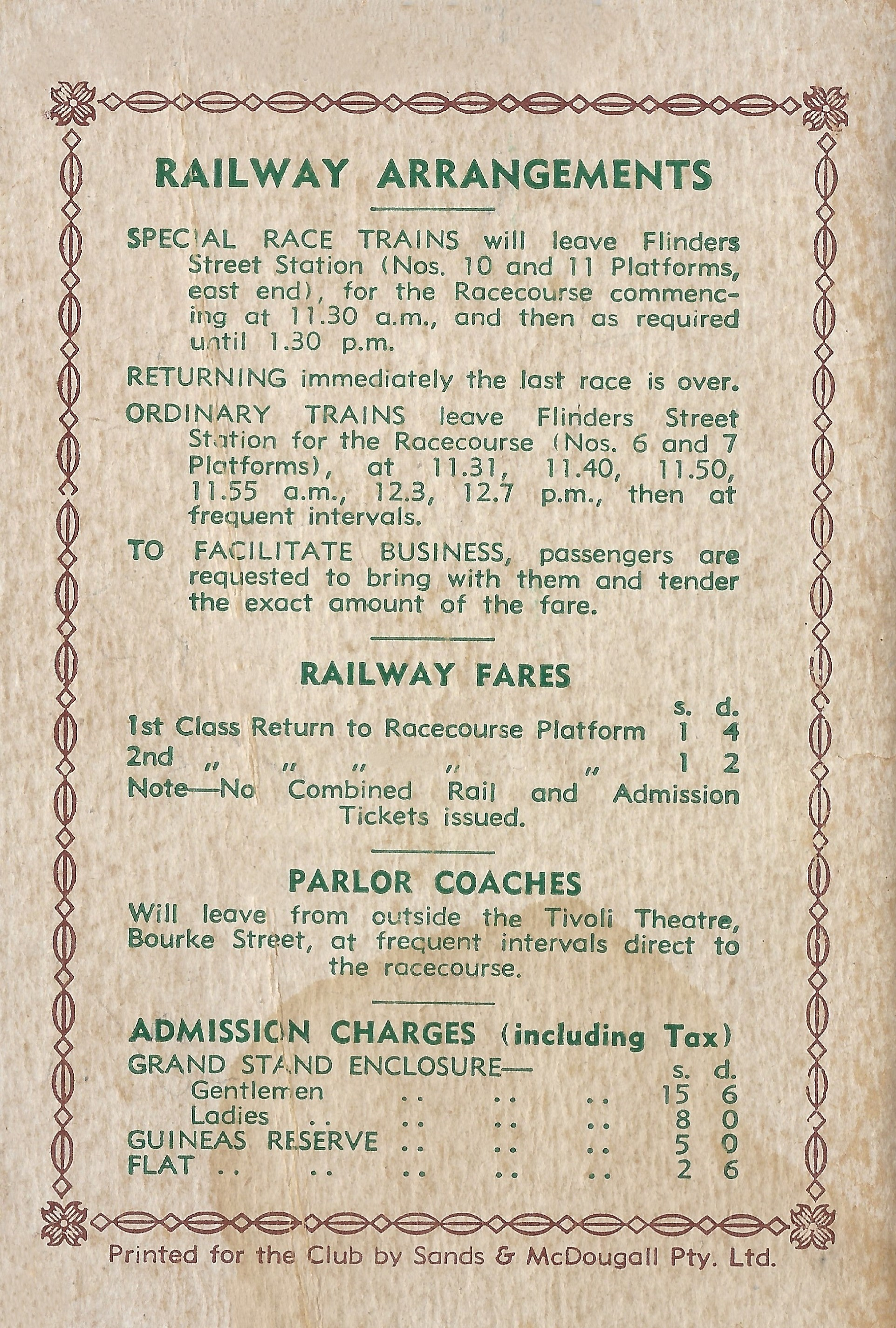
Back cover showing railway and admission charges

== Winners ==
The following are past winners of the race.

- 2026 – Shadhavar
- 2025 (November) – Jimmysstar (Note: The race was run twice in 2025 due to the scheduled month changing from February to November.)
- 2025 (February) – Another Wil
- 2024 – Mr Brightside
- 2023 – Jacquinot (Note: In 2023 Gentleman Roy crossed the finish line first, but was relegated to second place due to interference.)
- 2022 – Tofane
- 2021 – Streets of Avalon
- 2020 – Alabama Express
- 2019 – Manuel
- 2018 – Hartnell
- 2017 – Black Heart Bart
- 2016 – Suavito
- 2015 – Dissident
- 2014 – Moment Of Change
- 2013 – All Too Hard
- 2012 – Black Caviar
- 2011 – Typhoon Tracy
- 2010 – Typhoon Tracy
- 2009 – Maldivian
- 2008 – Shinzig
- 2007 – El Segundo
- 2006 – Perfect Promise
- 2005 – Elvstroem
- 2004 – Lonhro
- 2003 – Yell
- 2002 – Barkada
- 2001 – Desert Sky
- 2000 – Redoute's Choice
- 1999 – Grand Archway
- 1998 – Special Dane
- 1997 – Saintly
- 1996 – Racer's Edge
- 1995 – Jeune
- 1994 – Primacy
- 1993 – Durbridge
- 1992 – Let's Elope
- 1991 – Planet Ruler
- 1990 – Vo Rogue
- 1989 – Vo Rogue
- 1988 – Vo Rogue
- 1987 – At Talaq
- 1986 – Delightful Belle
- 1985 – Fine Offer
- 1984 – Qubeau
- 1983 – Torbek
- 1982 – Lawman
- 1981 – Manikato
- 1980 – Manikato
- 1979 – Manikato
- 1978 – Hyperno
- 1977 – Surround
- 1976 – Plush
- 1975 – Leilani
- 1974 – All Shot
- 1973 – Longfella
- 1972 – Abdul
- 1971 – Black Onyx
- 1970 – Crewman
- 1969 – Fileur
- 1968 – Winfreux
- 1967 – Tobin Bronze
- 1966 – Rio
- 1965 – Future
- 1964 – Havelock
- 1963 – Aquanita
- 1962 – Wenona Girl
- 1961 – Anonyme
- 1960 – Lord
- 1959 – Lord
- 1958 – Highfire
- 1957 – Golden Doubles
- 1956 – Rising Fast
- 1955 – Prince Cortauld
- 1954 – Flying Halo
- 1953 – Ellerslie
- 1952 – Grey Boots
- 1951 – Comic Court
- 1950 – St. Razzle
- 1949 – Ungar
- 1948 – St. Fairy
- 1947 – Attley
- 1946 – Flight
- 1945 – Drum Net
- 1944 – Lawrence
- 1943 – Primavera
- 1942 – Burrabil
- 1941 – Mildura
- 1940 – High Caste
- 1939 – Manolive
- 1938 – Hua
- 1937 – Iva
- 1936 – Cardinal
- 1935 – Break Up
- 1934 – Gaine Carrington
- 1933 – Liberal
- 1932 – Greenline
- 1931 – Byron
- 1930 – Gallopade
- 1929 – Gothic
- 1928 – Sailing Home
- 1927 – Heroic
- 1926 – Whittier
- 1925 – The Night Patrol

== See also ==
- How Now Stakes
- Sandown Guineas
- Summoned Stakes
- Thoroughbred Club Stakes
- List of Australian Group races
- Group races
