= Manikato =

Australian-bred Thoroughbred racehorse

- Sire: Manihi (AUS)
- Grandsire: Matrice (AUS)
- Dam: Markato (AUS)
- Damsire: Natural Bid (USA)
- Sex: Gelding
- Foaled: 2 September 1975
- Country: Australia
- Colour: Chestnut
- Breeder: R. Truscott, SA.
- Owner: E.A.J.M. (Mal) Seccull
- Trainer: Bon Hoysted and Bob Hoysted
- Record: 47: 29-8-5
- Earnings: $1,154,210

Major wins
- Blue Diamond Stakes (1978); Golden Slipper Stakes (1978); Caulfield Guineas (1978); Invitation Stakes (1978); Futurity Stakes (1979, 1980, 1981, 1983); Rothmans 100,000 (1979); William Reid Stakes (1979, 1980, 1981, 1982, 1983); George Ryder Stakes (1979, 1980)

Awards
- Australian Horse of the Year (1979)

Honours
- Australian Racing Hall of Fame inductee (2002)
- Last updated on 31 August 2011

Manikato (1975–1984) was a champion Australian Thoroughbred racehorse of the late 1970s and early 1980s. He established new track records in three races and was inducted into the Australian Racing Hall of Fame. Manikato was the second Australian horse, after Kingston Town, to win $1 million in stakes, and, by today's standards, won 20 races which are currently (2012) classed as Group One (G1) races.

He was a tall, heavily topped chestnut gelding by the VRC Newmarket Handicap winner Manihi from Markato by Natural Bid (USA). Markato was the dam of eight named foals, but Manikato was her only stakes-winner. Costing only A$3,500, Manikato had a double cross of Fair Trial in the fourth generation (4m x 4f) and was a descendant of Nearco through his dam.

== Racing career ==
He was originally trained by Bon Hoysted who died soon after Manikato's 1978 Golden Slipper victory. His brother Bob Hoysted took over his training subsequently.

=== At two years ===
As a two-year-old, Manikato won the Blue Diamond Stakes and Golden Slipper Stakes double.

=== At three years ===
Manikato won eight races and was second three times out of twelve starts. He finished second three times, including one to champion stayer, Dulcify, in the Australian Cup over 2,000 metres.

Manikato commenced the season with a win in the Ascot Vale Stakes in record time. Three weeks later he started against older horses in the Marlboro Cup which he also won. In the Caulfield Guineas Manikato defeated Karaman by about two lengths after a protest against him was dismissed, but his jockey Gary Willetts was suspended. He then started in the Craven A Stakes (now known as the Salinger Stakes) but had a slight rise in temperature on the day of the race. Manikato was defeated in this race by Always Welcome by the margin of a neck. After being spelled Manikato won the first of his five victories in the William Reid Stakes on 29 January 1979. The C F Orr Stakes at Sandown was Manikato’s next start and another victory. His win the Futurity Stakes was the first of four wins that he had in this race. In 1978 the race was run over 1800 metres and in his first attempt at a distance beyond a mile, Manikato won untouched and easing up by 4 lengths in a course record time. IAt his next start in the Australian Cup over 2000 metres he was taken on in front by three horses during the running and was only caught in the shadows of the post by Dulcify who was unbeaten at Flemington until his tragic injury in the 1979 Melbourne Cup, Manikato next started in the George Ryder Stakes where he dropped back 500 metres in distance and won by six lengths, again in record time with Joyita finishing second. A week later Manikato started as a 3yo in the Doncaster Handicap carrying 57.5 kg. This was 3.5 kg over the weight carrying record for a three-year-old in the Doncaster held by Tontonan, himself a great champion of the Australian turf. Manikato was again challenged for the lead throughout the race and dead heated for third place. A new Australian record was set for the 1,600 metres race. In early July 1979 Manikato was taken to Brisbane for the Rothmans 100,000 (now known by its original name of the Doomben 10,000). Carrying a 3yo weight record of 58 kg he equalled Baguette’s weight carrying record and became the first 3yo to win over $500,000 in prize money.

=== At four years ===
Five weeks later Manikato started his 4yo season with the first of two wins in the Freeway Stakes. On 24 September 1981 he finished second in the Marlboro Cup over 1,400 metres after he struck himself and was galloped on during the running of the race. He won William Reid Stakes and Futurity Stakes. In Sydney Manikato won the G1 George Ryder Stakes. Two weeks later he started in the AJC Galaxy Stakes with 60.5 kg and finished in 8th position. After the race he was found to have suffered a bleeding attack.

=== At five years ===
In 1981 Manikato won the William Reid Stakes, Futurity Stakes and Orr Stakes again. In the autumn Manikato had to overcome serious adversity again when he damaged his suspensory tendons. After every race, Bon wrapped the horse's legs with plastic shopping bags filled with ice, to reduce inflammation. After a spell Manikato resumed racing at Sandown with a win on 1 September 1981 in a handicap in carrying 63.5 kg. Two weeks later he lined up in the Marlboro Cup with 60.5 kg finishing second to Soldier of Fortune to whom he conceded 8 kg. On 29 September 1981 Manikato started in the Queen Elizabeth Cup run in honour of the Queen’s attendance at the Caulfield meeting. Manikato won from Lawman with Sovereign Red in third place and equalled the course record of 1:35.7. His next start was in the Chirnside Stakes where he finished second.

After a spell Manikato returned to again win the William Reid Stakes. Four weeks later on 24 February 1982 Manikato contested his fourth consecutive Futurity Stakes but finished second this time. In the Canterbury Stakes at Sydney two weeks later Manikato defeated Opera Prince and Ubetido. He then finished third in the All Aged Stakes before being spelled for 18 weeks.

=== At six years ===
During 1982/3 season Manikato had 11 starts for five wins including the Freeway Stakes, Futurity Stakes, A J Moir Stakes, William Reid Stakes and Memsie Stakes.

He had 47 starts for 29 wins, 9 seconds and 4 thirds, including five successive William Reid Stakes and four Futurity Stakes winning 11 Group 1 races in all for $1,154,210.

== After retiring ==
After retiring from racing in 1983, Manikato was plagued by a virus which he could not shake off. He was humanely euthanized on 13 February 1984. He is buried within sight of some of his greatest wins in "Manikato's Garden" at Moonee Valley Racecourse.

The Group 1 Manikato Stakes, named in his honour is contested annually at the Moonee Valley Racecourse. The Manikato Restaurant in the grandstand at Caulfield Racecourse is also named in his honour.

He was inducted into the Australian Racing Hall of Fame in 2002.

== See also ==
- List of leading Thoroughbred racehorses
- Repeat winners of horse races
