= Prince Cortauld =

New Zealand-bred Thoroughbred racehorse

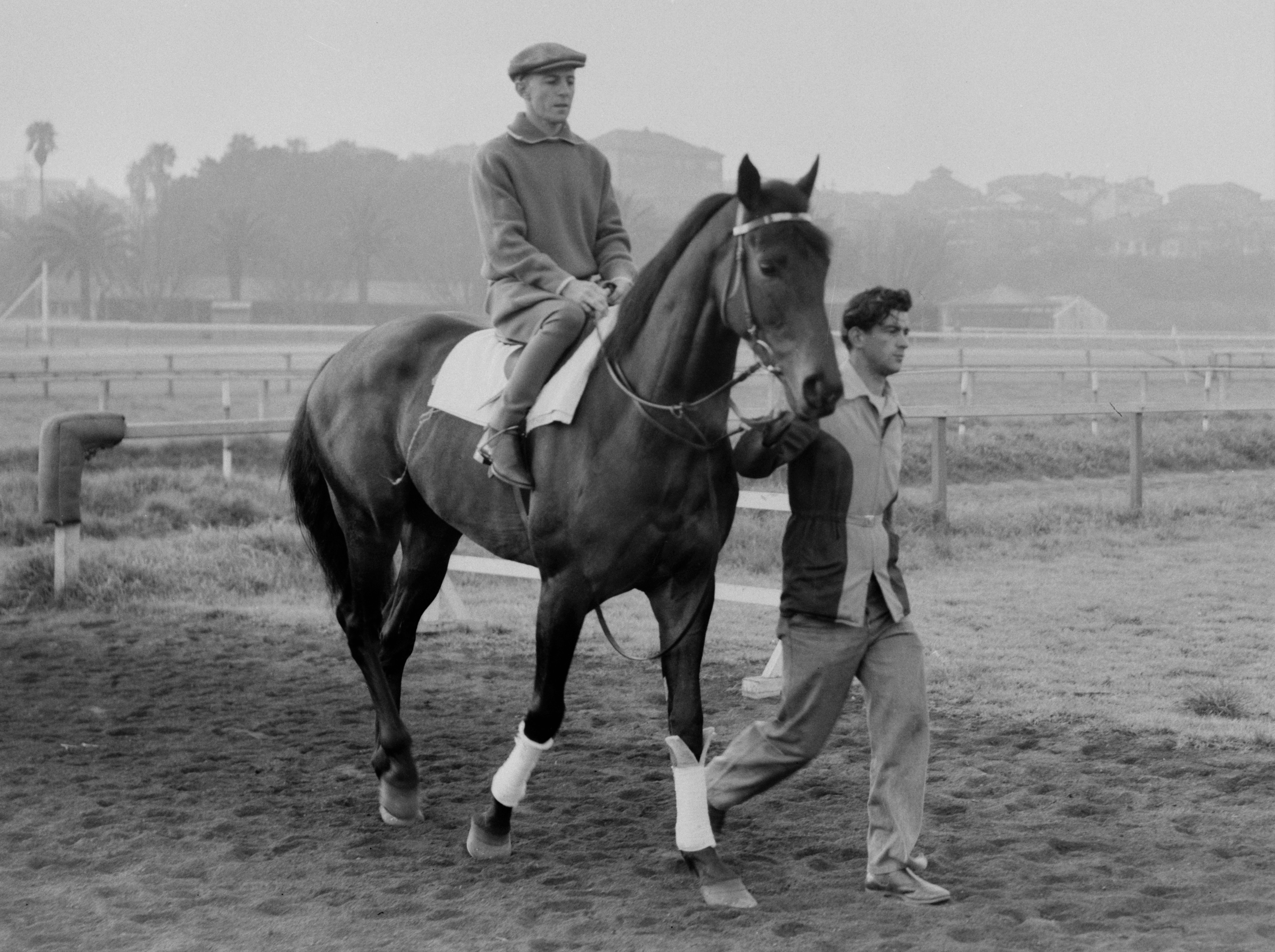
- Prince Cortauld & Neville Sellwood; Randwick Racecourse
- Sire: Sun King (GB)
- Grandsire: Hyperion (GB)
- Dam: Capricious (NZ)
- Damsire: Night Raid (GB)
- Sex: Stallion
- Foaled: 1950
- Country: New Zealand
- Colour: Brown
- Breeder: Ken Austin
- Owner: Michael J Moodabe
- Trainer: Maurice McCarten
- Record: 52: 25,9, 8
- Earnings: £51,215

Major wins
- AJC Champagne Stakes (1953); All Aged Stakes (1954); Chelmsford Stakes (1954); Hill Stakes (1954); Craven Plate (1954, 1955); Cantala Stakes (1954); Linlithgow Stakes (1954); MRC Williamstown Cup (1954); C F Orr Stakes (1955); Blamey Stakes (1955); Futurity Stakes (1955); VRC Queen Elizabeth Stakes (1955); AJC Autumn Stakes (1955); AJC Queen Elizabeth Stakes (1955); Warwick Stakes (1955); Caulfield Stakes (1955)

Prince Cortauld, was a brown Thoroughbred stallion, performing in Australia trained by Australian Racing Hall of Fame trainer Maurice McCarten raced from a two-year-old to a five-year-old recording 25 wins from 5 furlongs to 1¾ miles with champion jockey Neville Sellwood winning 19 races.

== Breeding ==
Prince Cortauld by Sun King (GB) was bred by Ken Austin in New Zealand and sold privately to owner Michael Moodabe. Dam Capricious (NZ) sired by Night Raid the sire of the immortal Phar Lap and Nightmarch was twice placed 2nd in the New Zealand Cup.

Breeder, Ken Austin was an Australian bloodstock and breeding authority a successful polo and premier amateur rider who in 1912 joined H. Chisholm and Company bloodstock auctioneers located at Randwick selling horses in Australia and New Zealand and handling all New Zealand yearlings sent to the Sydney sales but in 1926 they agreed to join forces with Wright Stephenson and Co.

== Racing career ==
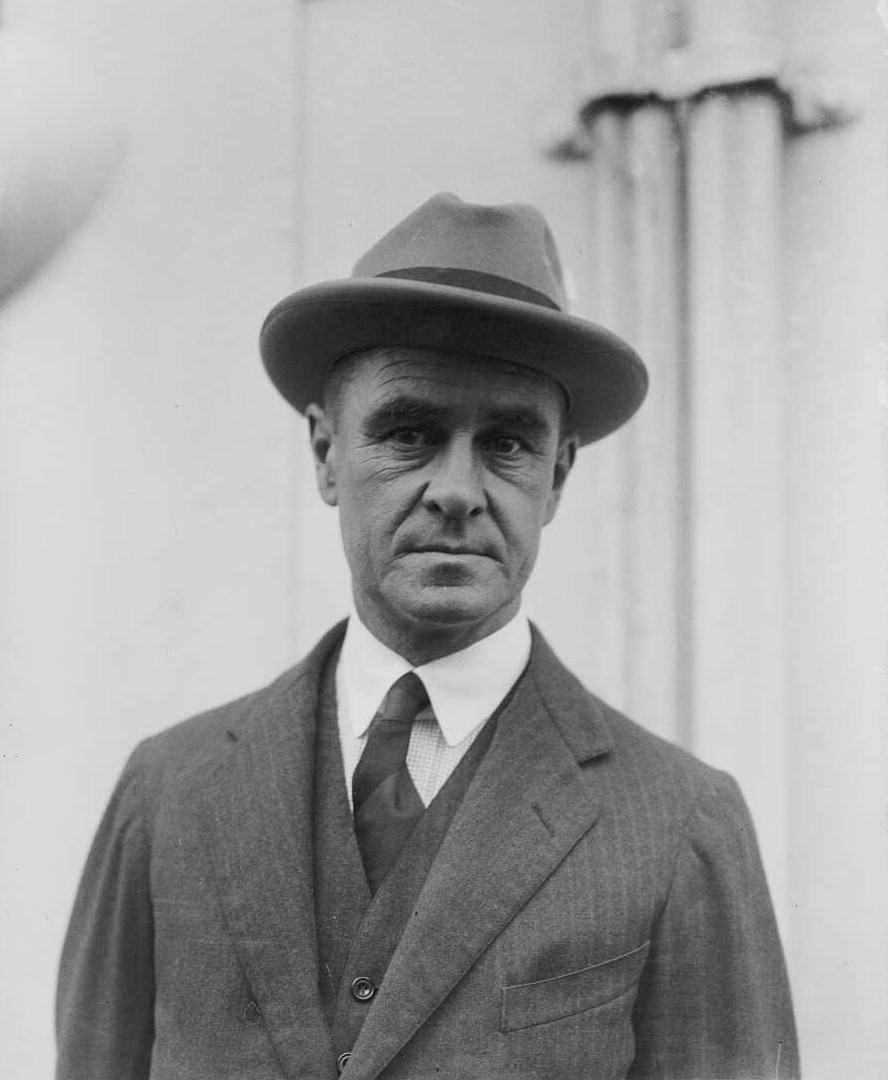
Ken Austin

Prince Cortauld trained by Maurice McCarten at Randwick and raced between 1952 - 1956 best known for defeating the New Zealand champion Rising Fast on three occasions in the 1955 VRC Queen Elizabeth Stakes, AJC Autumn Stakes, VATC Caulfield Stakes and carrying 66 kg to win the 1955 VATC Futurity Stakes defeating Coppice and Raconteur also wins in the 1954 & 1955 AJC Craven Plate defeating AJC Derby winners Prince Delville and Prince Morvi. In 1956 was exported to the United States when purchased by Los Angeles restaurant owner Mr Forest Smith to compete in the Washington, D.C. International Stakes with regular jockey Neville Sellwood making the trip finishing 3rd to Master Boing. Raced 20 times under new ownership before dropping dead after his only win at Pomona, California.

Owner, Michael Joseph Moodabe (1895-1975) from Auckland New Zealand was a leading cinema chain businessman who in 1936 merged his Amalgamated Theatre group with 20th Century Fox Film studios to guarantee film supply and then sold the remaining half share holding when television came to New Zealand in 1960 under his full management control. Other major race winners owned in Australia by Moodabe were Master Brierly 1935 AJC Plate and Montana 1952 George Main Stakes.

Prince Cortauld's Australian racing record: 52 starts for 25 wins, 9 seconds, 8 thirds and 10 unplaced runs.

=== 1954 & 1955 racebooks ===
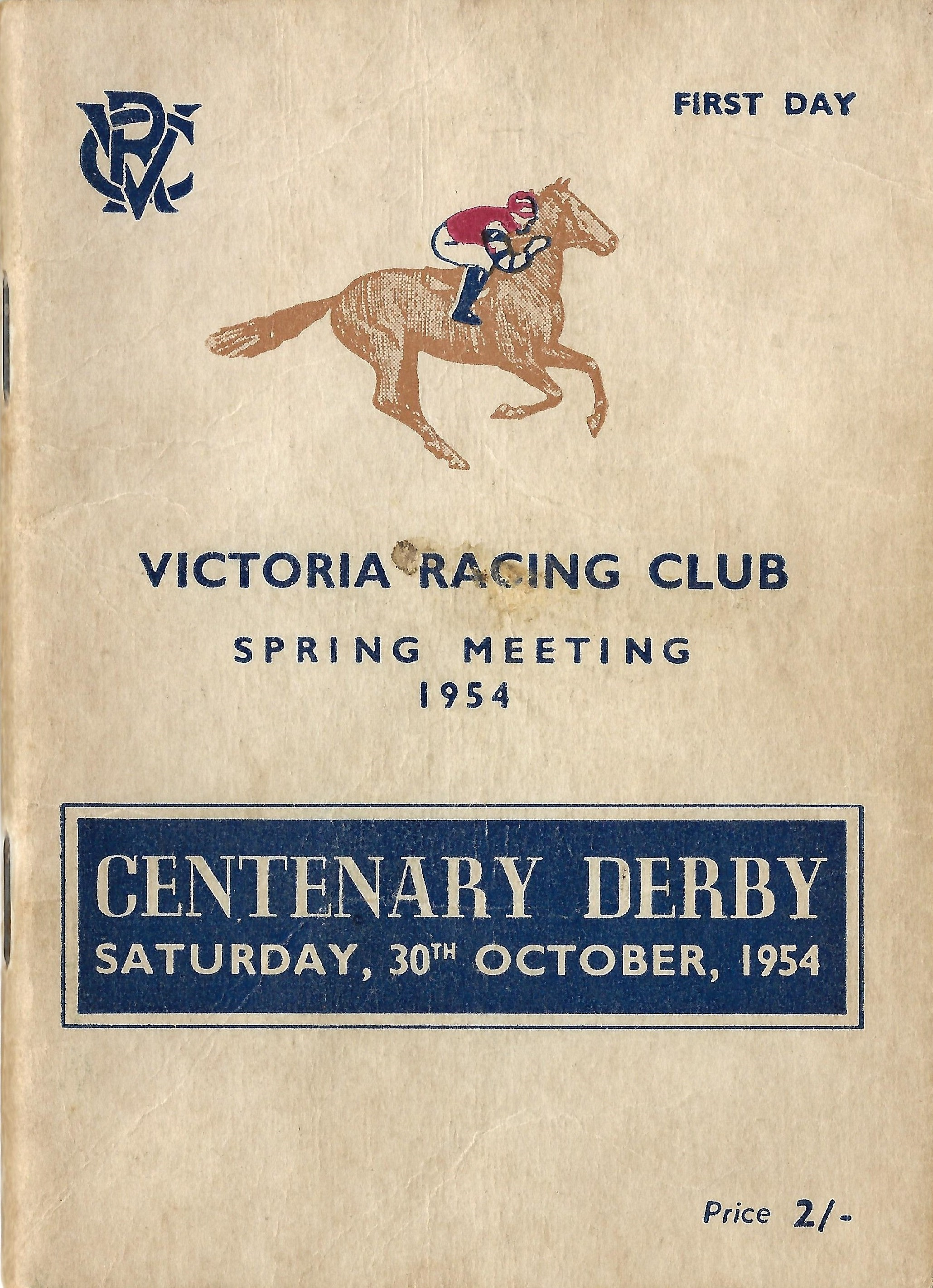
1954 VRC LKS Mackinnon Stakes racebook front cover

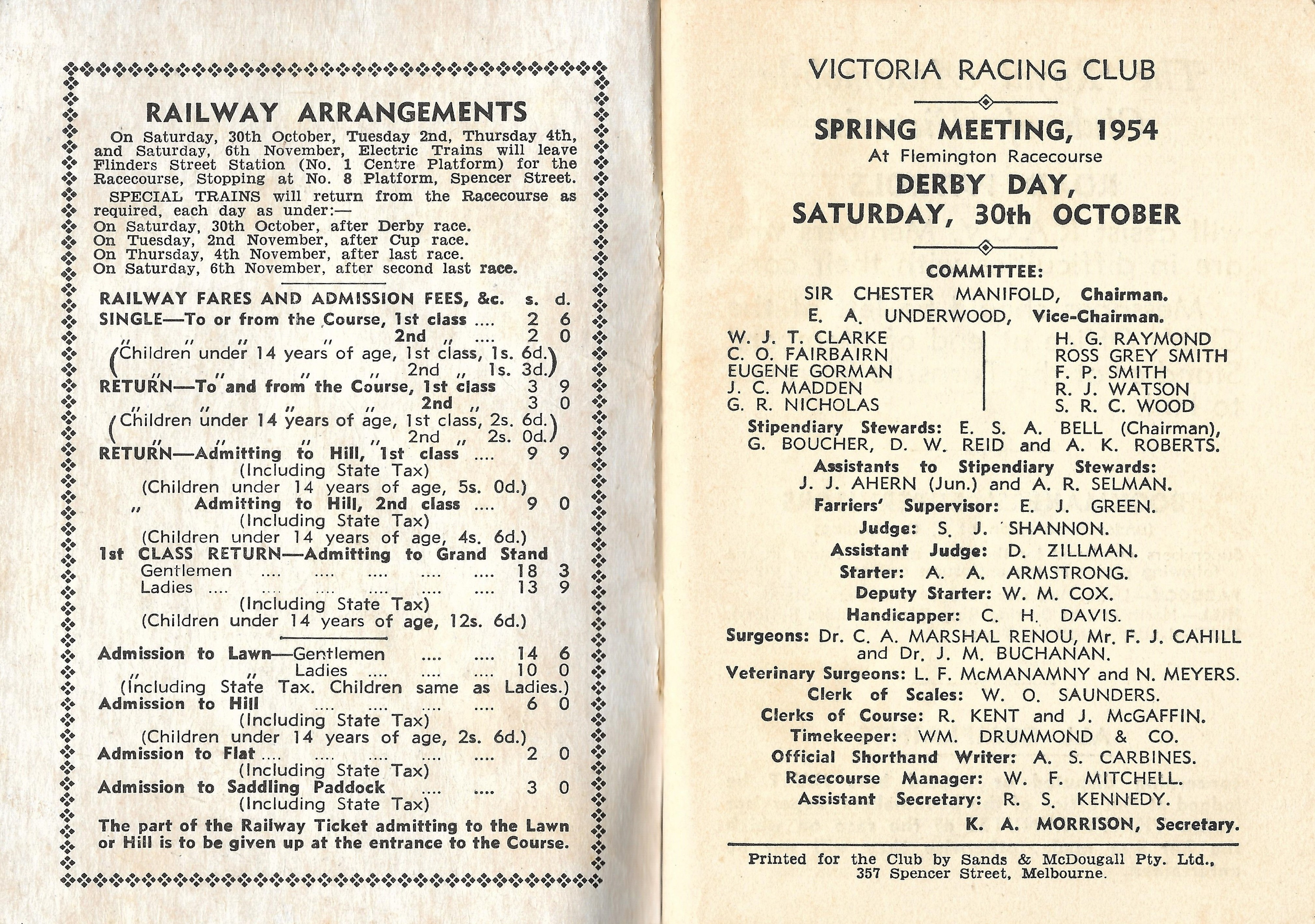
1954 VRC LKS Mackinnon Stakes showing raceday officials

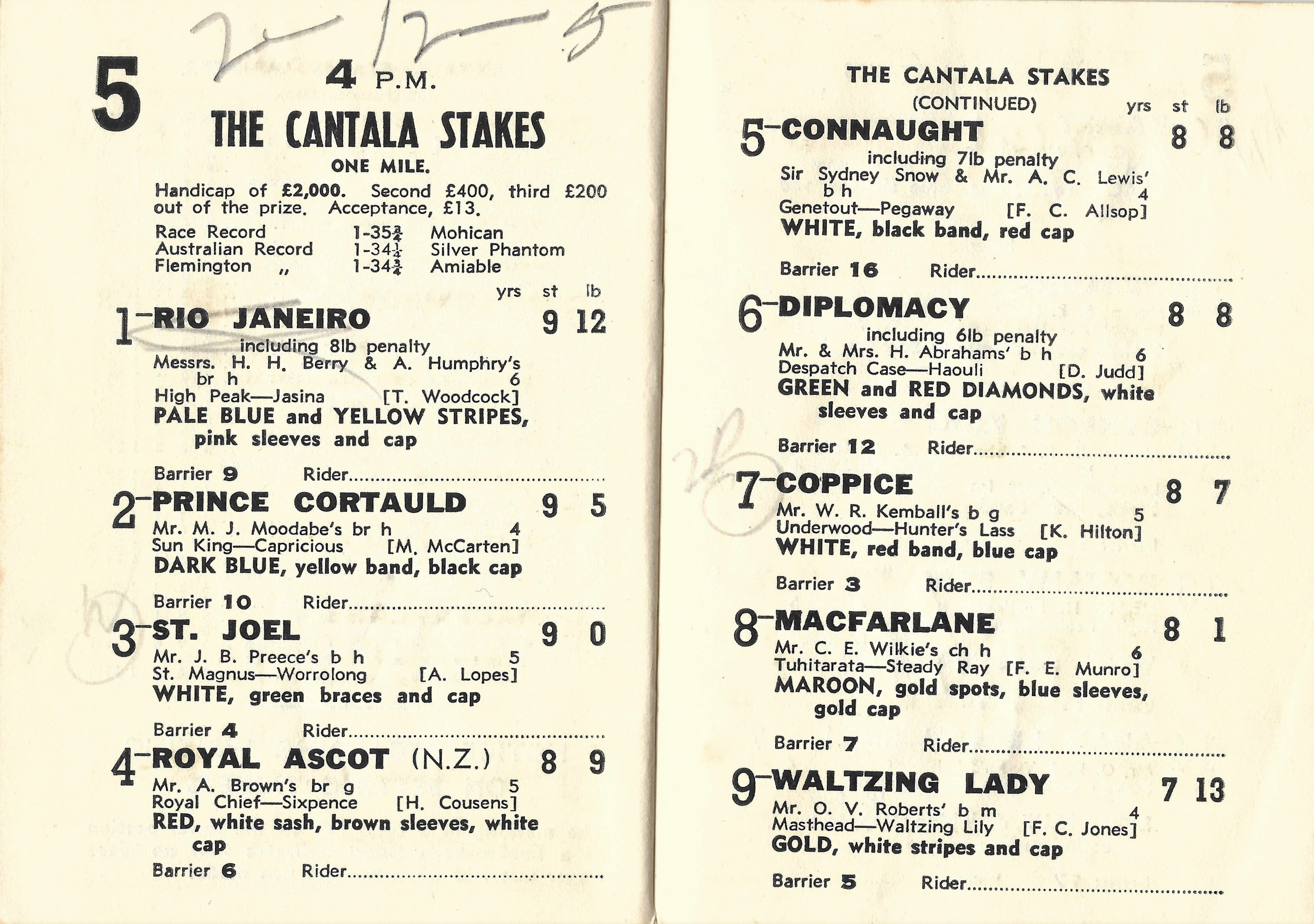
1954 Cantala Stakes page showing the winner, Prince Cortauld

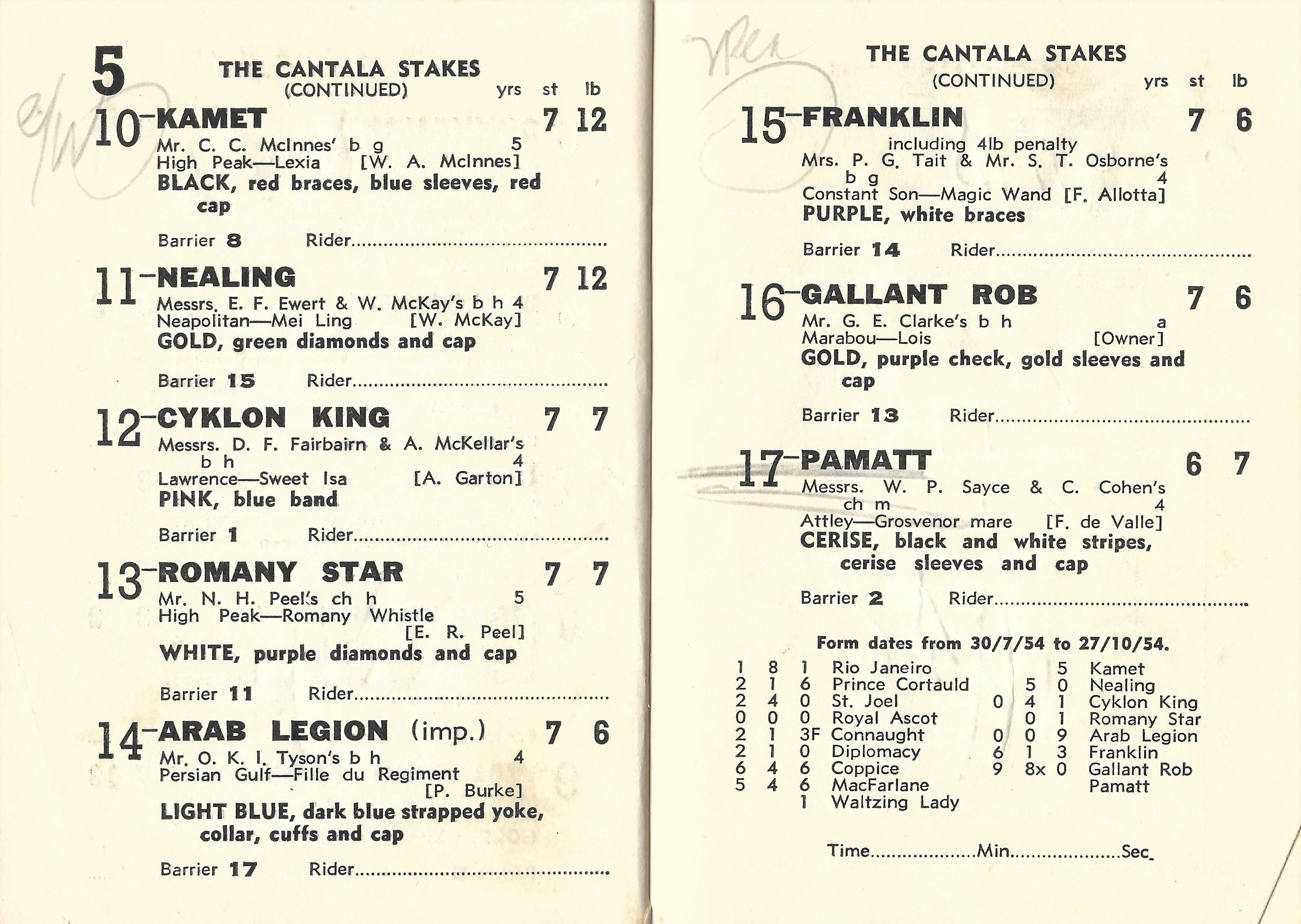
1954 Cantala Stakes page showing starters and results

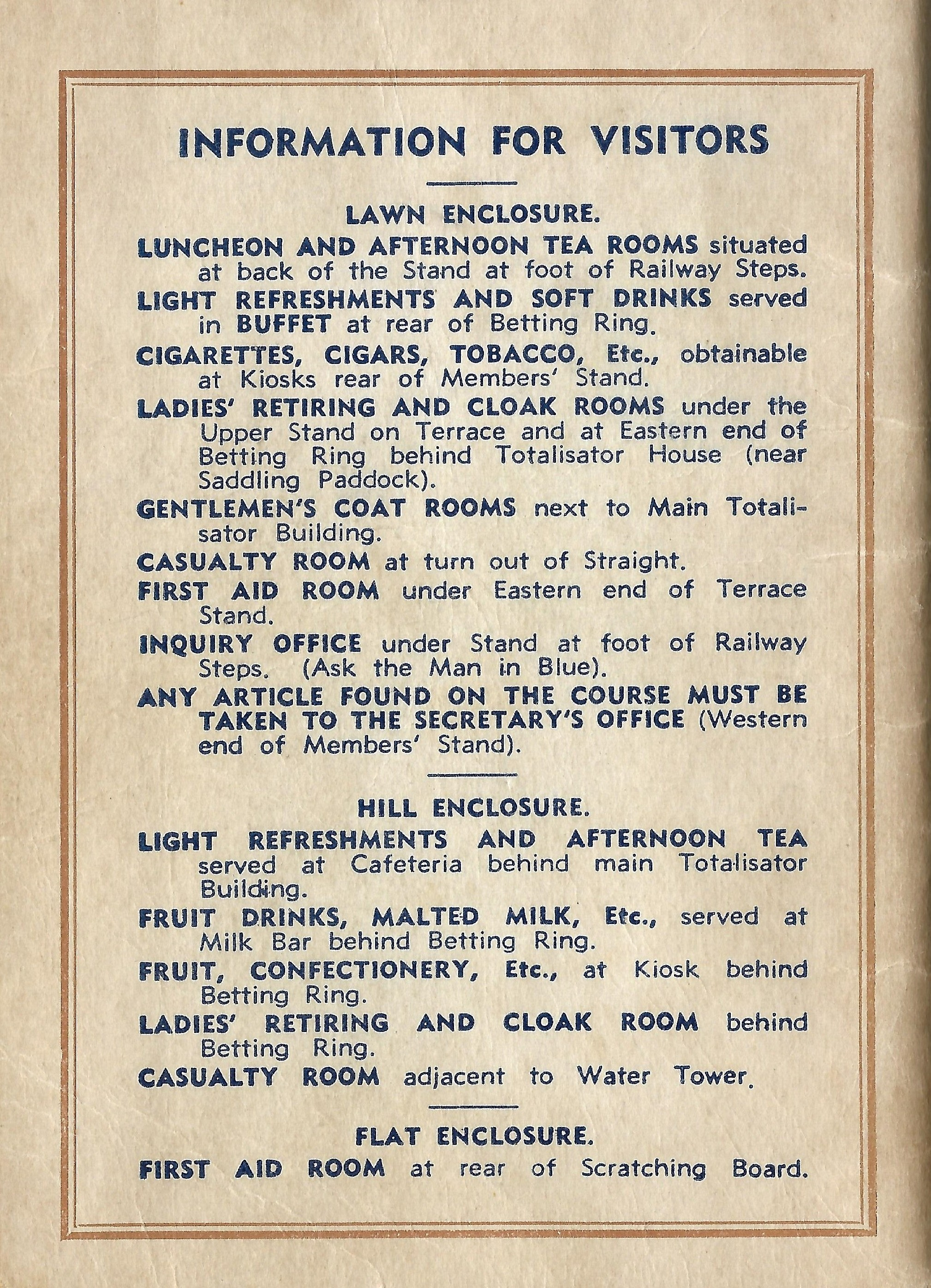
Back Cover showing enclosure information for visitors

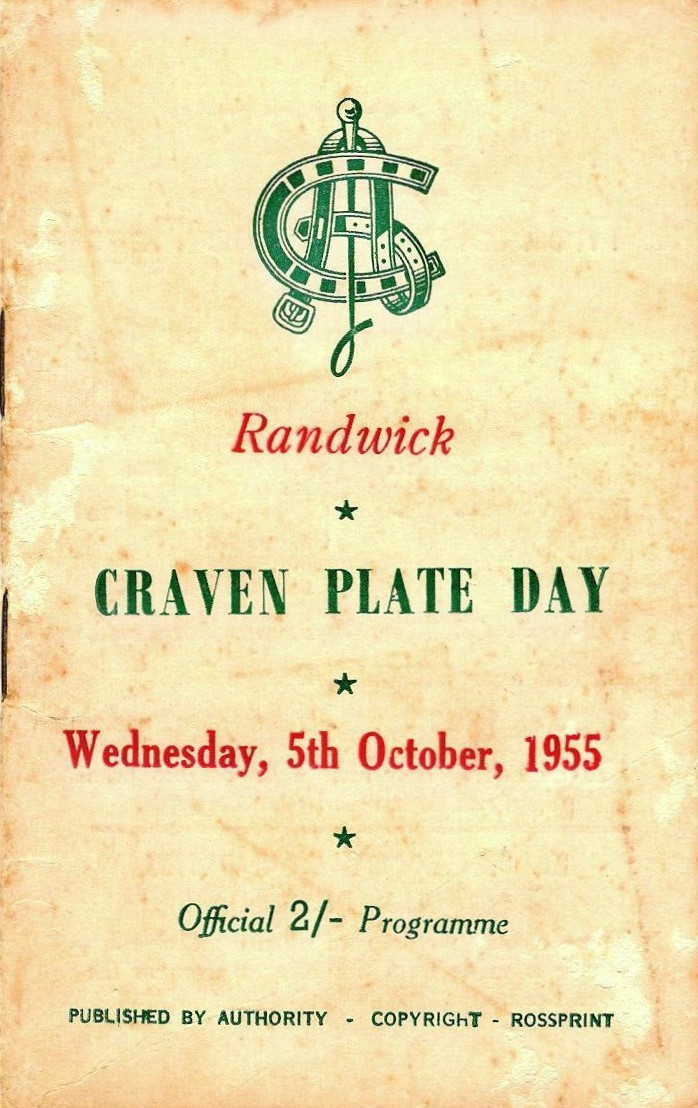
1955 AJC Craven Plate racebook front cover

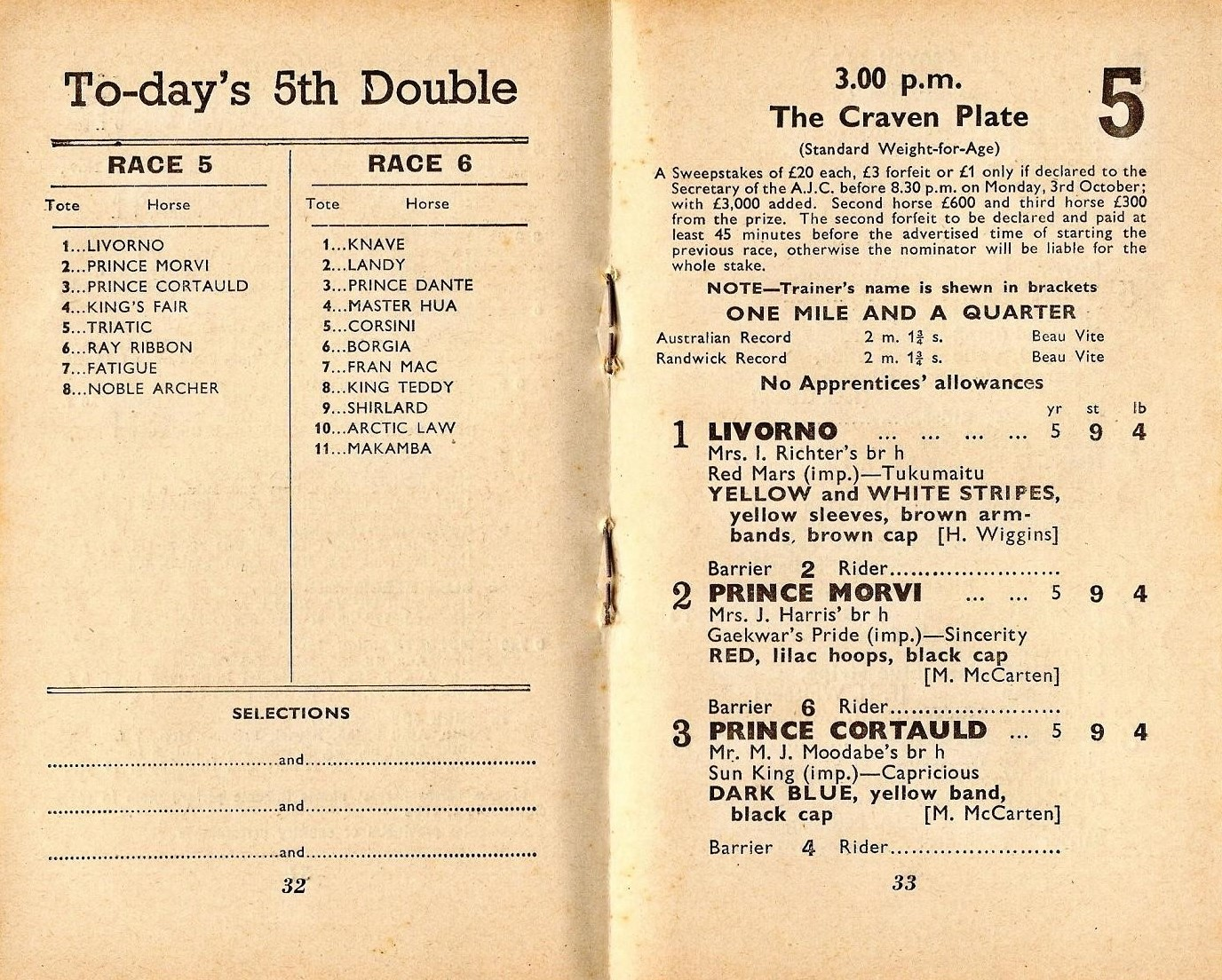
1955 AJC Craven Plate showing the winner, Prince Cortauld

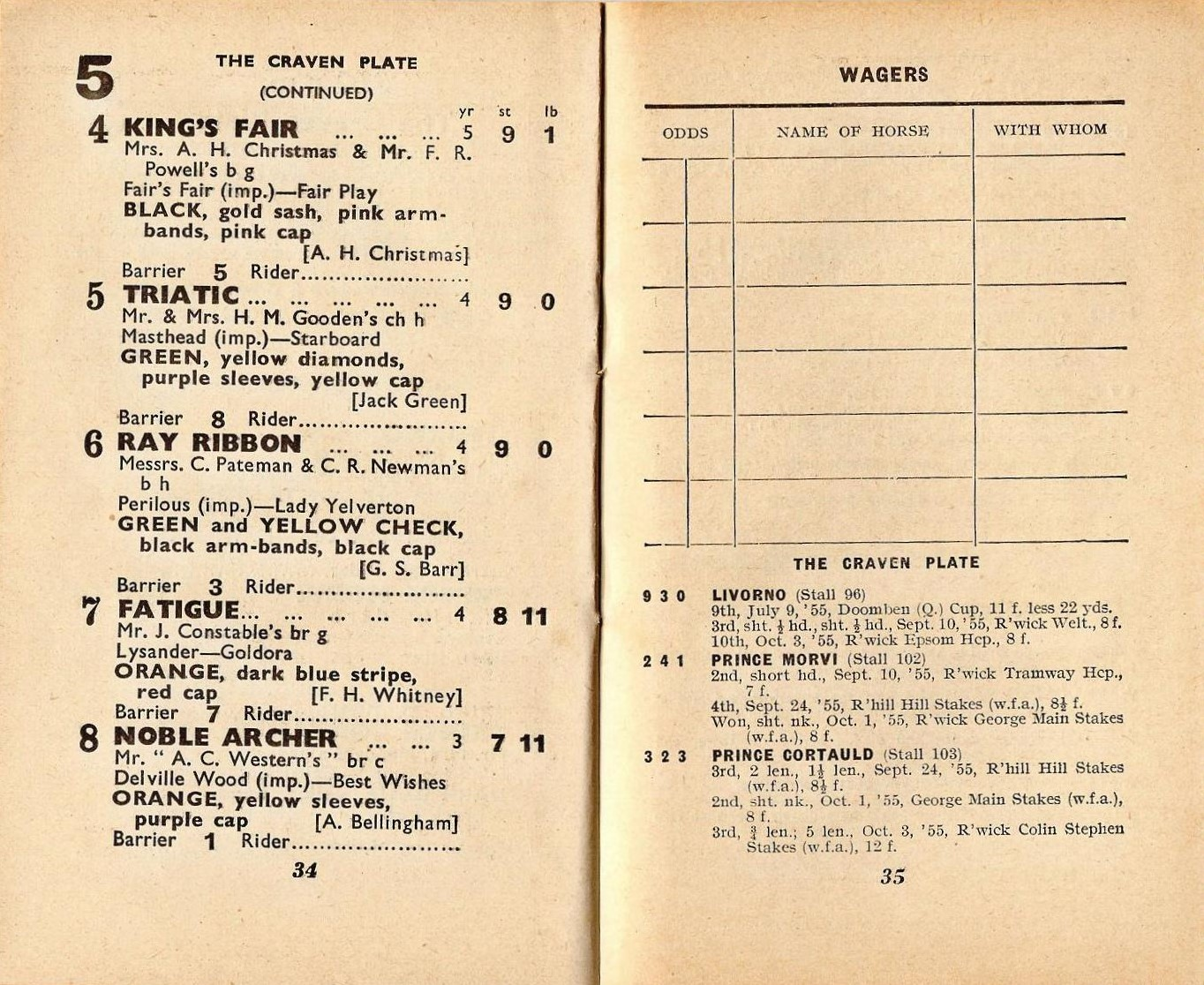
1955 AJC Craven Plate starters and results
