= 1976 Melbourne Cup =

Annual horse race in Victoria, Australia

- Melbourne Cup
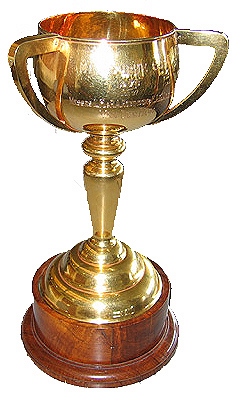
- The 1976 cup that was won by Van Der Hum
- Location: Flemington Racecourse
- Date: 2 November 1976
- Distance: 3200 metres
- Winning horse: Van der Hum
- Winning time: 3:34.10
- Final odds: 9/2
- Jockey: Bob Skelton
- Trainer: Leo & Roy Robinson
- Owner: L H & R A Robinson, et al.
- Surface: Turf
- Attendance: 81,118

It's Happy Union in front at the 400 from Summer Hay and Reckless, uh, coming down the outside now it's Van Der Hum! Van Der Hum and Gold and Black out after the leaders. Van Der Hum moves up now with Gold and Black and they're fighting the Cup out. Van Der Hum's taking a narrow lead from Gold and Black, Reckless and Happy Union and now at the 100 to go it's Van Der Hum in front in the Melbourne Cup. The mudlark's got it won! And Van Der Hum draws away to win a length and a half to Gold and Black.

— Commentator Bill Collins describes the climax of the race

The 1976 Melbourne Cup was a 3200-metre handicap horse race which took place on Tuesday, 2 November 1976.

This year was the hundred and sixteenth running of the Melbourne Cup.

This is the list of placegetters for the 1976 Melbourne Cup.

Place	Name	Jockey	Trainer
1	Van der Hum	Bob Skelton	Leo & Roy Robinson
2	Gold and Black	John Duggan	Bart Cummings
3	Kythera	Brent Thomson	W McEwan
4	Reckless	Peter Clarke	Tommy Woodcock
5	Happy Union	Gary Willetts	W C (Bill) Winder
6	Taras Regent	Ron Quinton	Tommy J. Smith
7	Summer Hay	John Stocker	Colin Hayes
8	Mer 'Cler	G Edge	C A Balfour
9	Demerara	Wayne Treloar	Gary Lee
10	Perhaps	Brian Andrews	Colin Jillings
11	Battle Heights	Larry Olsen	R Douglas
12	Galena Boy	Pat Hyland	John Hawkes
13	Grand Scale	Maurie Willmott	John Letts
14	Captain Meri	Max Baker	Jack Wood
15	My Royal Dell	Midge Didham	B T Jones
16	Participator	Roy Higgins	Tommy Smith
17	Current Issue	Alf Matthews	Jack Poletti
18	Fair Warning	Bob Durey	W C (Bill) Winder
19	Suileman	Pat Trotter	W C (Bill) Winder
20	Kelmont	Steven Burridge	K F Ruff
21	Taminga	Brian Gilders	Ted Broadhurst
22	Clear Day	Malcolm Johnston	xxx
23	Joueur	H G Heagney	L Hill

== See also ==
- Melbourne Cup
- List of Melbourne Cup winners
- Victoria Racing Club
