= Williamstown Racecourse =

Former horse racing track in Victoria, Australia

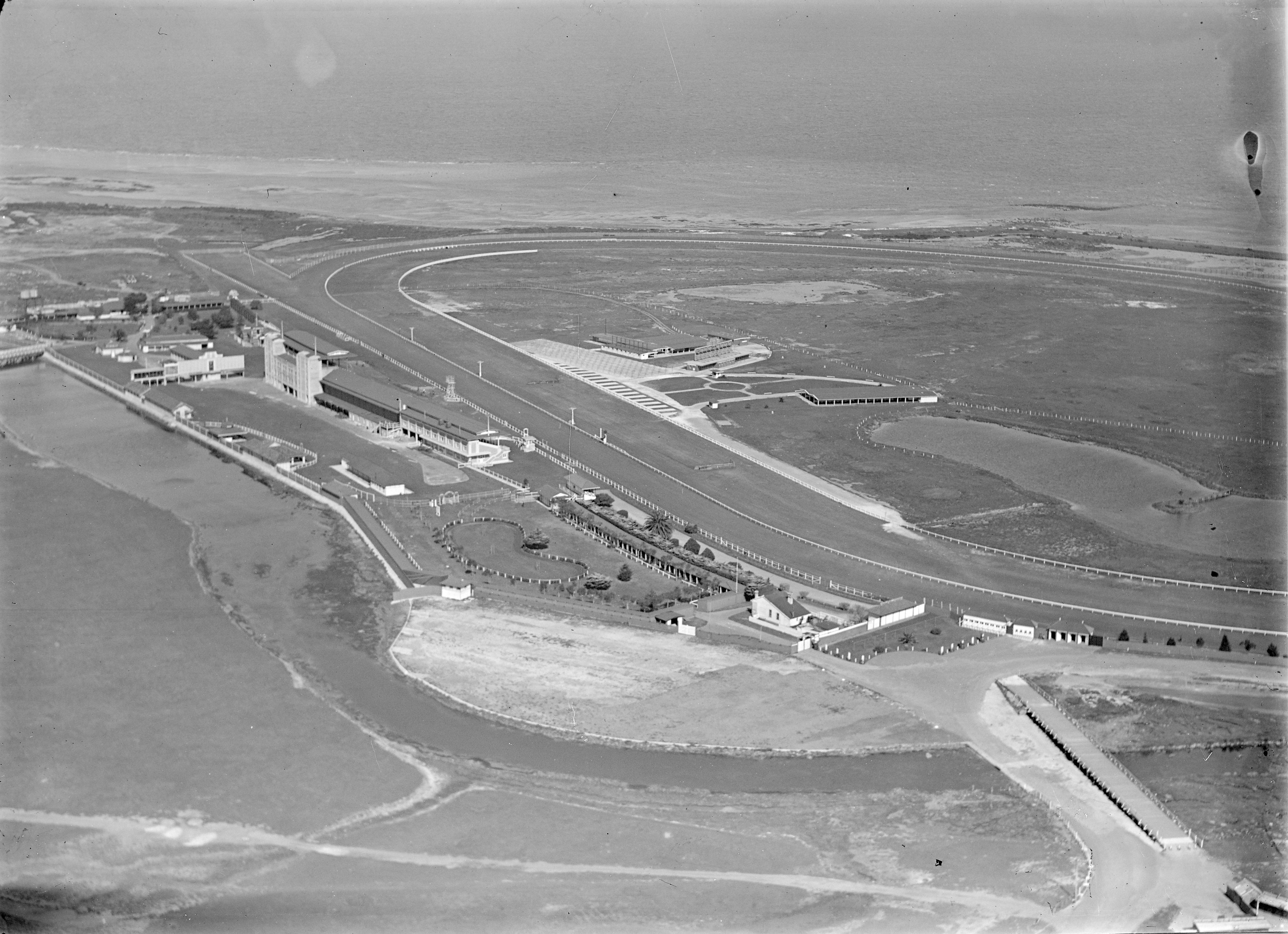
Aerial view of Williamstown Racecourse, with Hobsons Bay in background, taken circa 1925–1940.

Williamstown Racecourse was a horse racing track located at Altona, Victoria, Australia.

Located south of Kororoit Creek, the racecourse was opened in 1869, following the establishment of the Williamstown Racing Club the previous year.

In 1885, the Williamstown Racecourse railway station was opened as the terminus of a branch line from the main Geelong line, providing passenger services on race days.

In 1931, Phar Lap won the Underwood Stakes at the venue.

The last recorded horse race at Williamstown was on 10 February 1940, after which the army commandeered the racecourse for the remainder of World War II. In 1947, fire destroyed both the public and members grandstands.

The following year, the Williamstown Racing Club was forced to merge with the Victorian Trotting & Racing Association to form the new Melbourne Racing Club. In 1949, Williamstown Racecourse was sold for "surplus building materials" and became home to displaced World War II veterans.

A four-metre sculpture called Requiem for a Champion, created by the artist Yvonne George, featuring a bronze stint perched on top of a galloping horse, was installed to commemorate the location of the former Williamstown Racecourse.
