= Surround (horse) =

New Zealand-bred Thoroughbred racehorse

Surround (NZ)
- Sire: Sovereign Edition (IRE)
- Grandsire: Sovereign Path (GB)
- Dam: Micheline (NZ)
- Damsire: Le Filou (FR)
- Sex: Mare
- Foaled: 1973
- Country: New Zealand
- Colour: Grey
- Trainer: Geoff Murphy
- Record: 28: 17-2-2
- Earnings: A$347,030

Major wins
- W S Cox Plate (1976); VRC Oaks (1976); Caulfield Guineas (1976); C F Orr Stakes (1977); AJC Oaks (1977); Queensland Oaks (1977); Blamey Stakes (1977); Alister Clark Stakes (1977)

Awards
- Australian Racehorse of the Year (1977)

Honours
- Australian Racing Hall of Fame (2014); Surround Stakes
- Last updated on 10 March 2014

Surround was a champion Australian Thoroughbred racehorse, who won the 1976 Cox Plate.

Bred in New Zealand she was sired by Sovereign Edition (IRE), her dam Micheline (NZ) was by Le Filou (FR).

Trained by Geoff Murphy as a three-year-old she won 12 out of 16 starts over distances ranging from 1,200m to 2,500m including the 1976 Cox Plate, 1976 VRC Oaks, 1977 AJC Oaks, 1977 Queensland Oaks. She is the only filly to win the Cox Plate in the history of the race.

When returning as a four-year-old she suffered an injury to her foreleg. After three starts for one second placing the injury reappeared and she was retired from the race track. Her earnings were an Australian record for a mare to that time.
