= Vo Rogue =

Australian-bred Thoroughbred racehorse

- Sire: Ivor Prince
- Grandsire: Sir Ivor
- Dam: Vow
- Damsire: Dignitas
- Sex: Gelding
- Foaled: 12 November 1983
- Country: Australia
- Colour: Bay
- Breeder: Dr. L V Merchant
- Owner: J W Perry, G W Roberts
- Trainer: Vic Rail
- Record: 83: 26-14-9
- Earnings: A$3,118,100

Major wins
- Alister Clark Stakes (1987); Creswick Stakes (1987); Turnbull Stakes (1987, 1988); MRC Futurity Stakes (1988); Blamey Stakes (1988, 1989); C F Orr Stakes (1988, 1989, 1990); Winfield Stakes (1988); St George Stakes (1988, 1989); William Reid Stakes (1988); Australian Cup (1989, 1990); George Main Stakes (1989)

Honours
- Queensland Racing Hall of Fame (2004); Vo Rogue Plate at Gold Coast Racecourse; Australian Racing Hall of Fame (2019)
- Last updated on 14 May 2019

Vo Rogue (12 November 1983 – 7 May 2012) was an Australian Racing Hall of Fame Thoroughbred racehorse. He was sired by American-bred Ivor Prince whose racing career ended from injury after just two starts. Ivor Prince was a son of the British champion Sir Ivor who won the 1968 2,000 Guineas and Epsom Derby. His American damsire, Dignitas, was a multiple stakes winner in the United States and was a son of the U.S. Racing Hall of Fame inductee, Round Table. Vo Rogue was inducted into the Australian Racing Hall of Fame in 2019.

Vo Rogue was a successful front-running racehorse who thrilled Australian racegoers by setting up massive leads in his races, and defying the opposition to catch him. The bay gelding was trained by Vic Rail, and ridden by Cyril Small for 22 of his 26 wins. He was also ridden on at least two occasions by John Scorse who rose to prominence as the jockey of Placid Ark.

Vo Rogue was successful in Brisbane, Sydney, and Perth, but was at his best in Melbourne, particularly in the autumn, with the hard and fast tracks very much to his liking (he was controversially scratched from the Cox Plate in 1988 because Rail considered he was hopeless in any kind of rain-affected going). He dominated the weight-for-age races at the autumn carnivals of 1988, 1989, and 1990, defeating such outstanding horses as Campaign King and the Cox Plate winners Bonecrusher, Super Impose, Our Poetic Prince, and Better Loosen Up. He was successful from the William Reid Stakes (1,200 metres) to the Australian Cup (2,000 metres), and won various races in between, including the C F Orr Stakes (1,400 metres), the Blamey Stakes (1,600 metres), and the St George Stakes (1,800 metres).

In total, Vo Rogue won 26 races from 83 starts, including six Group One races, and a further five which now carry Group One status. His name has also entered Australian racing folklore, regularly summoned by racecallers and fans alike who speak of horses setting up "Vo Rogue-style" leads.

Vo Rogue died on 7 May 2012, at the age of 28.

== See also ==
- List of racehorses
- Repeat winners of horse races
