= Blamey Stakes =

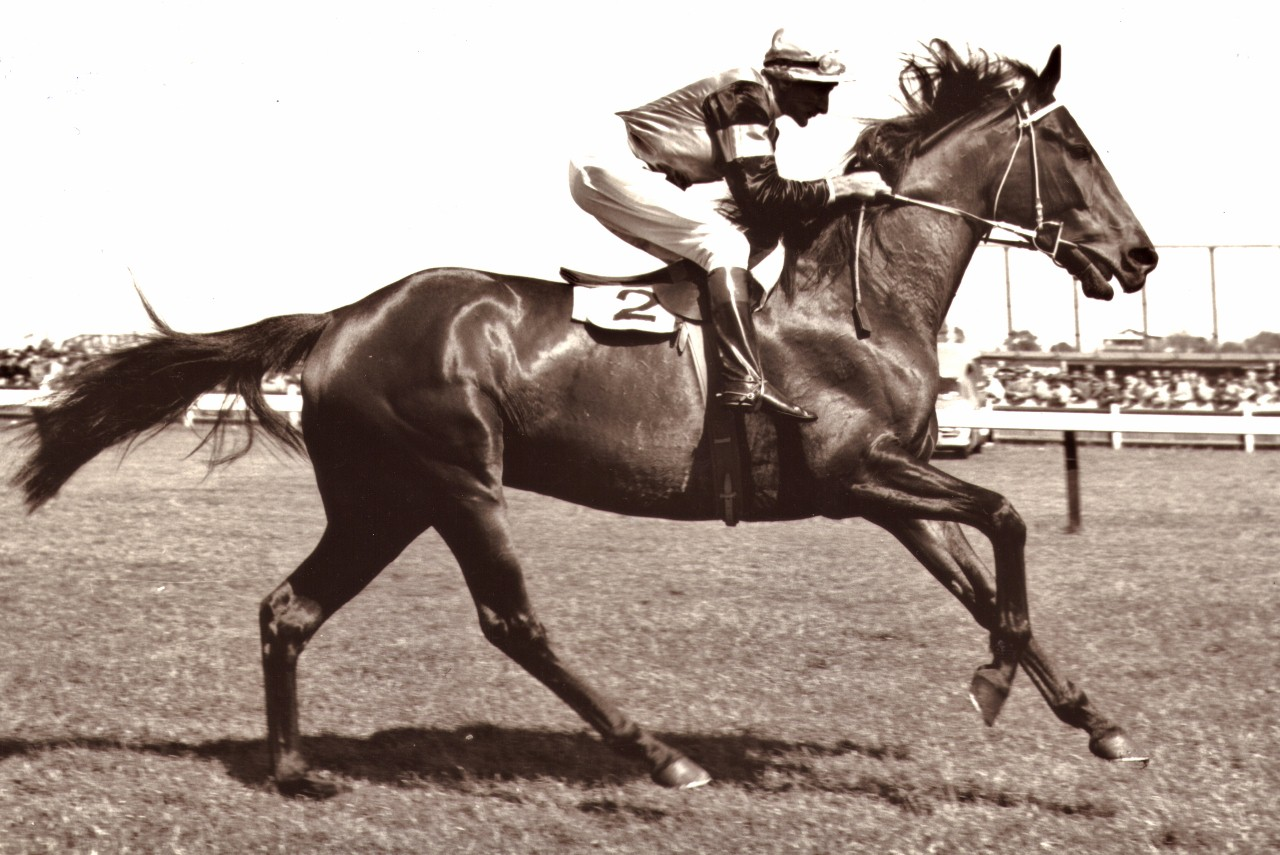
- 1956 winner – Rising Fast
- Class: Group 2
- Location: Flemington Racecourse
- Inaugurated: 1955
- Race type: Thoroughbred
- Sponsor: TAB (2022-26)

Race information
- Distance: 1,600 metres
- Surface: Turf
- Qualification: Three years old and older
- Weight: Set weights with penalties
- Purse: $300,000 (2026)

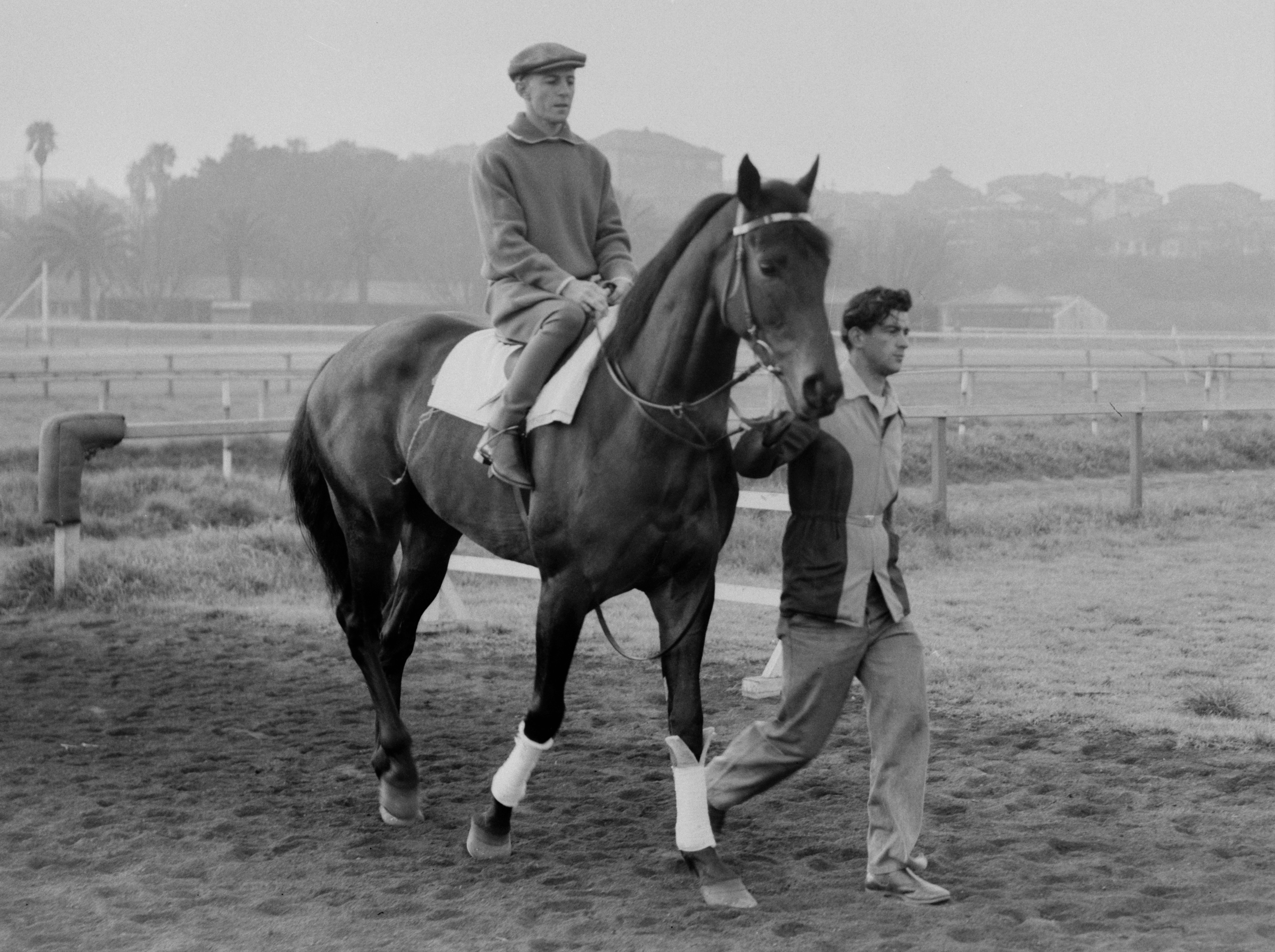
Prince Cortauld, 1955 winner

The Blamey Stakes is a Victoria Racing Club Group 2 Thoroughbred horse race for three years old and older, with Set Weights with Penalties conditions over 1600 metres, at Flemington Racecourse, Melbourne, Australia in March during the VRC Autumn Racing Carnival.

== History ==
The race is named after Sir Thomas Albert Blamey, who was Australia's only native born Field marshal and was a Victoria Racing Club Committee member from 1947 until his death in 1951.

The race has been won by horses of exceptional calibre that have won at 2400 metres (~1 1/2 miles) or longer. These include such thoroughbreds that also competed overseas as Tobin Bronze and Better Loosen Up.

=== Distance ===
- 1955–1972 - 1 1/4 miles (~2000 metres)
- 1973 onwards - 1600 metres

=== Grade ===
- 1955–1979 - Principal Race
- 1979 onwards - Group 2

=== Venue ===
In 2007 the race was run at Sandown Racecourse due to reconstruction of Flemington Racecourse.

=== Conditions ===
From 1955 to 1980 the race was run at Weight for Age.

== Winners ==
The following are past winners of the race.

- 2026 - Birdman
- 2025 - Marble Arch
- 2024 - Atishu
- 2023 - Nonconformist
- 2022 - Inspirational Girl
- 2021 - Star Of The Seas
- 2020 - Fifty Stars
- 2019 - Fifty Stars
- 2018 - Humidor
- 2017 - Palentino
- 2016 - He Or She
- 2015 - Suavito
- 2014 - Lidari
- 2013 - †Puissance De Lune / Budriguez
- 2012 - Green Moon
- 2011 - Whobegotyou
- 2010 - Lord Tavistock
- 2009 - Largo Lad
- 2008 - The Fuzz
- 2007 - Apache Cat
- 2006 - Rosden
- 2005 - Grey Song
- 2004 - Gold Wells
- 2003 - Walk On Air
- 2002 - Tears Royal
- 2001 - Market Price
- 2000 - Oliver Twist
- 1999 - Thackeray
- 1998 - Willoughby
- 1997 - Zuccherino
- 1996 - Racer's Edge
- 1995 - Durbridge
- 1994 - Durbridge
- 1993 - Prince Salieri
- 1992 - Shiva's Revenge
- 1991 - Better Loosen Up
- 1990 - Better Loosen Up
- 1989 - Vo Rogue
- 1988 - Vo Rogue
- 1987 - Playful Princess
- 1986 - Lord Of Camelot
- 1985 - Beechcraft
- 1984 - Penny Edition
- 1983 - Trissaro
- 1982 - Kip
- 1981 - Hyperno
- 1980 - Hyperno
- 1979 - Leonotis
- 1978 - Opposition
- 1977 - Surround
- 1976 - Lord Dudley
- 1975 - Zambari
- 1974 - Sobar
- 1973 - Gunsynd
- 1972 - Surrender
- 1971 - Gay Icarus
- 1970 - Cyron
- 1969 - Fileur
- 1968 - Future
- 1967 - Tobin Bronze
- 1966 - Tobin Bronze
- 1965 - Sir Dane
- 1964 - Teppo Star
- 1963 - Mamburdi
- 1962 - Dhaulagiri
- 1961 - Dhaulagiri
- 1960 - Wool Man
- 1959 - But Beautiful
- 1958 - Sailor's Guide
- 1957 - Sailor's Guide
- 1956 - Rising Fast
- 1955 - Prince Cortauld

† Dead heat

== See also ==
- List of Australian Group races
- Group races
