= Hyperno =

New Zealand-bred Thoroughbred racehorse

- Sire: Rangong (GB)
- Grandsire: Right Royal
- Dam: Mikarla
- Damsire: Persian Garden II (GB)
- Sex: Gelding
- Foaled: 1973
- Country: New Zealand
- Colour: Bay
- Breeder: Fairdale Stud Ltd.
- Owner: Sir Thomas & Lady North, et al.
- Trainer: 1. G.T. Murphy; 2. Bart Cummings
- Record: 76: 20-14-13
- Earnings: A$722,145

Major wins
- Newcastle Gold Cup (1977); The BMW Stakes (1978); C F Orr Stakes (1978); Melbourne Cup (1979); VRC Queen Elizabeth Stakes (1979, 1980); Blamey Stakes (1980, 1981); Australian Cup (1981); Rawson Stakes (1981)

Awards
- Australian Horse of the Year (1981)
- Last updated on 31 August 2011

Hyperno (1973–2002) was a Thoroughbred racehorse foaled in New Zealand. He was a wayward but brilliant galloper that won the 1979 Melbourne Cup and other group and listed races.

He was sired by Rangong (GB) out of Mikarla (NZ) by Persian Garden II (GB). He was trained in his early years at Caulfield by Geoff Murphy. A dispute over training methods between Murphy and Hyperno's owners in 1978 led to Bart Cummings taking over as trainer. The winner of a string of group and listed races throughout his career, Hyperno won the 1979 Melbourne Cup with jockey Harry White aboard. In 1981, Hyperno was voted Australian Horse of the Year. Hyperno enjoyed a celebrated retirement at the rural property of his Melbourne Cup rider, Harry White, where he died in 2002.
