= Percy Sykes Stakes =

Percy Sykes Stakes registered as Keith Mackay Handicap
- Class: Group 2
- Location: Randwick Racecourse
- Inaugurated: 1960 (as Keith Mackay Handicap)
- Race type: Thoroughbred - flat
- Sponsor: TAB (2026)

Race information
- Distance: 1,200 metres
- Surface: Turf
- Track: Right-handed
- Qualification: Two year old fillies
- Weight: Set weights with penalties
- Purse: A$1,000,000 (2026)

The Percy Sykes Stakes, registered as the Keith Mackay Handicap, is an Australian Turf Club Group 2 Thoroughbred horse race, for two-year-old fillies, at set weights with penalties, over a distance of 1200 metres, held at Randwick Racecourse in Sydney, Australia in the autumn during the ATC Championships series. It is run on the same day as the Sydney Cup.

== History ==
The registered racename is named in honour of the former AJC Chairman Keith Mackay.

In 2014 the ATC substantially increased the prizemoney and the race was scheduled as part of the ATC Championships series and renamed the race to the Royal Randwick Stakes. In 2015 the race was once again renamed in honour of the veterinarian Percy Sykes (1920–2014), who had saved Tulloch and had worked with famous trainers in the industry, including T J Smith, Bart Cummings, Gai Waterhouse and Jack Denham.

=== Name ===
- 1960–2013 - Keith Mackay Handicap
- 2014 - Royal Randwick Stakes
- 2015 onwards - Percy Sykes Stakes

=== Grade ===
- 1960–1978 - Principal Race
- 1979–2013 - Listed Race
- 2014–2016 - Group 3
- 2017 onwards - Group 2

=== Distance ===
- 1960–1969 - 6 furlongs (~1200 metres)
- 1970–1971 - 7 furlongs (~1400 metres)
- 1972–1983 - 1,200 metres
- 1984–1985 - 1,400 metres
- 1986 onwards - 1,200 metres

== Winners ==
The following are past winners of the race.

- 2026 - Cherry Bomshell
- 2025 - Tempted
- 2024 - Eneeza
- 2023 - Kristilli
- 2022 - Paris Dior
- 2021 - Jamaea
- 2020 - Away Game
- 2019 - Anaheed
- 2018 - Pure Elation
- 2017 - Shoals
- 2016 - Missrock
- 2015 - Ottoman
- 2014 - Eloping
- 2013 - Everage
- 2012 - Single Style
- 2011 - Streama
- 2010 - Golden Millennium
- 2009 - Readyor
- 2008 - Shoboard
- 2007 - Sliding Cube
- 2006 - Catechuchu
- 2005 - Blizzardly
- 2004 - Strawberry Storm
- 2003 - Bella Corona
- 2002 - Before Too Long
- 2001 - Allez France
- 2000 - Actress
- 1999 - Katima
- 1998 - Emotive
- 1997 - Snapshots
- 1996 - Law Of Logic
- 1995 - Ginzano
- 1994 - Alouette
- 1993 - Miss Prospect
- 1992 - Flitter
- 1991 - Dangerous Seam
- 1990 - Rhythmic Charm
- 1989 - Dazzling Flyer
- 1988 - Paris Weekend
- 1987 - The Cloisters
- 1986 - Magic Flute
- 1985 - Zipella
- 1984 - †Stater / Dinky Flyer
- 1983 - Lady Eclipse
- 1982 - I Like Diamonds
- 1981 - Circle Of Song
- 1980 - Gay Rosalind
- 1979 - Charity
- 1978 - Impede
- 1977 - Red Cat
- 1976 - †Fleet Princess / Truly Brave
- 1975 - La Stupenda
- 1974 - Catkin
- 1973 - Favoured
- 1972 - Admire
- 1971 - Kiss Me Cait
- 1970 - Tumberlua
- 1969 - Obelia
- 1968 - Miss Mink
- 1967 - Surre Queen
- 1966 - Candy Floss
- 1965 - Lone
- 1964 - Anemone
- 1963 - Constant Image
- 1962 - April Wonder
- 1961 - Cymbal
- 1960 - Primrose Lane

† Run in Divisions

== See also ==
- Arrowfield 3YO Sprint
- Australian Oaks
- Queen Elizabeth Stakes (ATC)
- Queen of the Turf Stakes
- Sapphire Stakes (ATC)
- South Pacific Classic
- Sydney Cup
- List of Australian Group races
- Group races
