= South Pacific Classic =

Australian horse race

The South Pacific Classic is an Australian Jockey Club listed Thoroughbred horse race for three-year-olds, at set weights, over a distance of 1400 metres. It is held annually at Randwick Racecourse in Sydney in April.

== History ==
- The race was a Listed class race before 2003.
- The race was down graded to a Listed race in 2011.

== Winners ==
The following are past winners of the race.

- 2026 - Beskar
- 2025 - Sergeant Major
- 2024 - Panic
- 2023 - Razeta
- 2022 - Vilana
- 2021 - Ellsberg
- 2020 - Indy Car
- 2019 - Fasika
- 2018 - California Turbo
- 2017 - Generalissimo
- 2016 - Handfast
- 2015 - Federal
- 2014 - Beauty's Beast
- 2013 - Platinum Kingdom
- 2012 - Landing
- 2011 - Lucha Libre
- 2010 - Star Of Octagonal
- 2009 - Fravashi
- 2008 - Royal Discretion
- 2007 - Danleigh
- 2006 - Martiniforus
- 2005 - Shania Dane
- 2004 - Only Words
- 2003 - Bollinger
- 2002 - Gabfest
- 2001 - Century Kid

== See also ==
- Arrowfield 3YO Sprint
- Australian Oaks
- Percy Sykes Stakes
- Queen Elizabeth Stakes (ATC)
- Queen of the Turf Stakes
- Sapphire Stakes (ATC)
- Sydney Cup
- List of Australian Group races
- Group races
