= Arrowfield 3YO Sprint =

Arrowfield 3YO Sprint registered as Royal Sovereign Stakes
- Class: Group 2
- Location: Randwick Racecourse, Sydney, Australia
- Inaugurated: 1979
- Race type: Thoroughbred
- Sponsor: Arrowfield Stud (2014-26)

Race information
- Distance: 1,200 metres
- Surface: Turf
- Qualification: Three year olds
- Weight: Set weights
- Purse: $ 1,000,000 (2026)

The Arrowfield 3YO Sprint, registered as the Royal Sovereign Stakes, is an Australian Turf Club Group 2 Thoroughbred horse race, for three-year-olds at set weights over a distance of 1200 metres, held at Randwick Racecourse in Sydney, Australia in April during the ATC Championships Carnival.

== History ==
The race was first run in 1979 and was held in the summer. The registered racename is named in honour of Triple Derby winner Royal Sovereign, who won in 1964 the AJC Derby, VRC Derby and the Queensland Derby. In 2014 the ATC moved the race as part of ATC Championships Carnival in April substantially increasing the prizemoney and renaming the race.

=== Name ===
- 1979–2013 - Royal Sovereign Stakes
- 2014 onwards - Arrowfield 3YO Sprint

=== Grade ===
- 1979 - Principal Race
- 1981–1995 - Group 3
- 1996 onwards - Group 2

=== Conditions ===
Prior to 2013 the race was restricted only to colts and geldings.
Prior to 2006 the race was held with set weights with penalties.

=== Distance ===
- 1979–1996 – 1200 metres
- 1997–1998 – 1100 metres
- 1999–2003 – 1200 metres
- 2004 – 1180 metres
- 2005 onwards - 1200 metres

=== Venue ===
- 1979–1996 - Randwick Racecourse
- 1997–1998 - Randwick Racecourse Inner track
- 1999–2001 - Randwick Racecourse
- 2002 - Warwick Farm Racecourse
- 2003–2011 - Randwick Racecourse
- 2012 - Warwick Farm Racecourse
- 2013 - Rosehill Racecourse
- 2014 onwards - Randwick Racecourse

== Winners ==
The following are past winners of the race.

- 2026 - Tempted
- 2025 - Enriched
- 2024 - Joliestar
- 2023 - Aft Cabin
- 2022 - Mazu
- 2021 - Wild Ruler
- 2020 - Splintex
- 2019 - Classique Legend
- 2018 - Catchy
- 2017 - Derryn
- 2016 - Japonisme
- 2015 - Delectation
- 2014 - Sidestep
- 2013 - Rebel Dane
- 2012 - Hot Snitzel
- 2011 - Master Harry
- 2010 - Shoot Out
- 2009 - Youthful Jack
- 2008 - El Cambio
- 2007 - Mutawaajid
- 2006 - Flying Pegasus
- 2005 - Dance Hero
- 2004 - Exceed And Excel
- 2003 - Athelnoth
- 2002 - Lonhro
- 2001 - Assertive Lad
- 2000 - Hire
- 1999 - Lawyer
- 1998 - Guineas
- 1997 - Sovereign State
- 1996 - Catalan Opening
- 1995 - Danewin
- 1994 - Rouslan
- 1993 - Coronation Day
- 1992 - Big Dreams
- 1991 - All Archie
- 1990 - Shaftesbury Avenue
- 1989 - Ima Carpenter
- 1988 - Dream Faith
- 1987 - Imperial Baron
- 1986 - Hula Chief
- 1985 - Chimes Square
- 1984 - All Chant
- 1983 - Red Currant
- 1982 - Best Western
- 1981 - Trench Digger
- 1980 - race not held
- 1979 - Acamar

== See also ==
- Australian Oaks
- Percy Sykes Stakes
- Queen Elizabeth Stakes (ATC)
- Queen of the Turf Stakes
- Sapphire Stakes (ATC)
- South Pacific Classic
- Sydney Cup
- List of Australian Group races
- Group races
