= Australian Oaks =

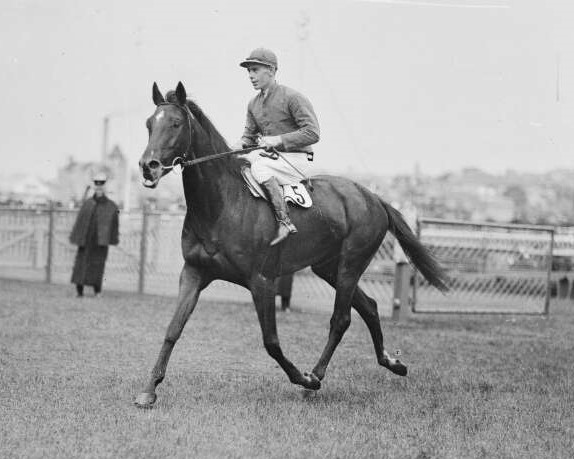
- Valicare, 1926 winner
- Class: Group 1
- Location: Randwick Racecourse, Sydney, Australia
- Inaugurated: 1885 (as AJC Oaks)
- Race type: Thoroughbred
- Sponsor: Asahi Super Dry (2025 & 2026)

Race information
- Distance: 2,400 metres
- Surface: Turf
- Track: Right-handed
- Qualification: Three year old fillies
- Weight: Set weights - 56 kg
- Purse: $1,000,000 (2026)

The Australian Oaks is an Australian Turf Club Group 1 Thoroughbred horse race for three year old fillies at set weights run over a distance of 2,400 metres at Randwick Racecourse, Sydney in the autumn during the ATC Championships series. The Australian Oaks is the premier staying race for three-year-old fillies during the Sydney autumn racing carnival.

Flight, 1944 winner

== History ==
From inception in 1885 to 1894 this race was known as the AJC Oaks. The race was not held between 1895 and 1921, and when it was resumed it was known as the Adrian Knox Oaks Stakes until 1956. Since 1994 this race has been known as the AJC Australian Oaks and after the merger of the AJC and STC as the ATC Australian Oaks.

Between 1922 and 1945 the race was held in January.

Record time for the 2400 distance was set in 2006 by Serenade Rose with the time of 2:28.6 seconds.

=== Distance ===
- 1885–1894 - 1 1/2 miles (~2400 metres)
- 1922–1945 - 1 mile (~1600 metres)
- 1946–1955 - 1 1/4 miles (~2000 metres)
- 1956–1972 - 1 1/2 miles (~2400 metres)
- 1973 onwards - 2400 metres

== Winners ==
The following are past winners of the race.

- 2026 - Ohope Wins
- 2025 - Treasurethe Moment
- 2024 - Autumn Angel
- 2023 - Pennyweka
- 2022 - El Patroness
- 2021 - Hungry Heart
- 2020 - Colette
- 2019 - Verry Elleegant
- 2018 - Unforgotten
- 2017 - Bonneval
- 2016 - Sofia Rosa
- 2015 - Gust Of Wind
- 2014 - Rising Romance
- 2013 - Royal Descent
- 2012 - Streama
- 2011 - Absolutely
- 2010 - Once Were Wild
- 2009 - Daffodil
- 2008 - Heavenly Glow
- 2007 - Rena's Lady
- 2006 - Serenade Rose
- 2005 - Dizelle
- 2004 - Wild Iris
- 2003 - Sunday Joy
- 2002 - Republic Lass
- 2001 - Rose Archway
- 2000 - Coco Cobanna
- 1999 - Grand Archway
- 1998 - On Air
- 1997 - Danendri
- 1996 - Kenbelle
- 1995 - Circles Of Gold
- 1994 - Alcove
- 1993 - Mahaya
- 1992 - My Brilliant Star
- 1991 - Triscay
- 1990 - Domino
- 1989 - Research
- 1988 - Savana City
- 1987 - Bounding Away
- 1986 - Just Now
- 1985 - Our Sophia
- 1984 - La Souvronne
- 1983 - Starzaan
- 1982 - Sheraco
- 1981 - November Rain
- 1980 - Lowan Star
- 1979 - Valley Of Georgia
- 1978 - Invade
- 1977 - Surround
- 1976 - How Now
- 1975 - Sufficient
- 1974 - Leilani
- 1973 - Analie
- 1972 - Gossiper
- 1971 - Waikiki
- 1970 - Gay Poss
- 1969 - Flying Fable
- 1968 - Lowland
- 1967 - Farmer's Daughter
- 1966 - Dual Quest
- 1965 - Light Fingers
- 1964 - Jane Hero
- 1963 - Arctic Star
- 1962 - Indian Summer
- 1961 - Wenona Girl
- 1960 - Pique
- 1959 - Chicola
- 1958 - Gay Satin
- 1957 - Sandara
- 1956 - Evening Peal
- 1955 - Sabah
- 1954 - Edelweiss
- 1953 - Waterlady
- 1952 - Wayside Bloom
- 1951 - True Course
- 1950 - Elusive
- 1949 - Persist
- 1948 - Jalna
- 1947 - Sweet Chime
- 1946 - Rose Bay
- 1945 - Ribbon
- 1944 - Flight
- 1943 - Flying Shuttle
- 1942 - Whisper Low
- 1941 - Session
- 1940 - Climax
- 1939 - Early Bird
- 1938 - Sweet Myra
- 1937 - Sal Volatile
- 1936 - Cereza
- 1935 - Limyris
- 1934 - Leila Vale
- 1933 - Roman Spear
- 1932 - Gallantic
- 1931 - Tantrum
- 1930 - Gay Ballerina
- 1929 - Loquacious
- 1928 - Justify
- 1927 - Persuasion
- 1926 - Valicare
- 1925 - Meenah
- 1924 - Valdoona
- 1923 - All Wheat
- 1922 - Vodka
- 1895–1921 race not held
- 1894 - Acmena
- 1893 - Bessie Macarthy
- 1892 - Trieste
- 1891 - Corvette
- 1890 - Prelude
- 1889 - Spice
- 1888 - Pearlshell
- 1887 - Lava
- 1886 - †Tamarisk / Crossfire
- 1885 - Uralla

† Dead heat

== See also ==
- Arrowfield 3YO Sprint
- Percy Sykes Stakes
- Queen Elizabeth Stakes (ATC)
- Queen of the Turf Stakes
- Sapphire Stakes (ATC)
- South Pacific Classic
- Sydney Cup
- List of Australian Group races
- Group races
