= Liverpool City Cup =

- Class: Group 3
- Location: Randwick Racecourse, Sydney, Australia
- Inaugurated: 1970
- Race type: Thoroughbred

Race information
- Distance: 1,300 metres
- Surface: Turf
- Track: Right-handed
- Qualification: Horses three years old and older
- Weight: Handicap minimum 54 kg
- Purse: $250,000 (2026)

The Liverpool City Cup is an Australian Turf Club Group 3 Thoroughbred quality open handicap horse race for horses aged three years old and older, run over a distance of 1300 metres at Randwick Racecourse, Sydney, Australia in late February or early March.

== History ==
The race has had changes in grade, distance and location. In 1974 the race was run in 2 divisions. The race is held on the same race card as the Group 1 Chipping Norton Stakes.

Prior to 1970 there was an event called the Liverpool Handicap which was raced at a distance of 7 furlongs. In 1969 the race known as the Warwick Farm Autumn Cup was raced in 1970 as the Liverpool City Cup.

=== Distance ===
- 1970 - 1 1/2 miles (~2400 metres)
- 1971–1972 - 7 furlongs (~1400 metres)
- 1973–1978 - 1400 metres
- 1979–2007 - 1200 metres
- 2008 onwards - 1300 metres

=== Grade ===
- 1970–1978 - Principal Race
- 1979 onwards - Group 3

=== Venue ===
- 1979 - Warwick Farm Racecourse
- 1980–1981 - Randwick Racecourse
- 1982–2000 - Warwick Farm Racecourse
- 2001 - Randwick Racecourse
- 2002–2007 - Warwick Farm Racecourse
- 2008–2009 - Randwick Racecourse
- 2010–2015 - Warwick Farm Racecourse
- 2016 onwards - Randwick Racecourse

== Winners ==
The following are past winners of the race.

- 2026 - King Of Roseau
- 2025 - Iowna Merc
- 2024 - Phearson
- 2023 - Think About It
- 2022 - Ellsberg
- 2021 - Think It Over
- 2020 - Quackerjack
- 2019 - Dreamforce
- 2018 - Crack Me Up
- 2017 - McCreery
- 2016 - Charlie Boy
- 2015 - It's Somewhat
- 2014 - Terravista
- 2013 - Skyerush
- 2012 - Ofcourseican
- 2011 - Triple Elegance
- 2010 - Dreamscape
- 2009 - Judged
- 2008 - Danleigh
- 2007 - The Free Stater
- 2006 - Utzon
- 2005 - Sam Sung a Song
- 2004 - Carael Boy
- 2003 - Planchet
- 2002 - Bomber Bill
- 2001 - Continuum
- 2000 - Catatonic
- 1999 - Return To Go
- 1998 - Monopolize
- 1997 - Accomplice
- 1996 - Chlorophyll
- 1995 - So Keen
- 1994 - Silver Flyer
- 1993 - Pharaoh
- 1992 - All Archie
- 1991 - All Archie
- 1990 - Boasting
- 1989 - Boasting
- 1988 - Breakfast Creek
- 1987 - Ma Chiquita
- 1986 - Satin Sand
- 1985 - Gunyatti
- 1984 - Seeker's Gold
- 1983 - Rubens
- 1982 - Kalina
- 1981 - Arbogast
- 1980 - Le De'Jeuner
- 1979 - Lady Archon
- 1978 - Sabre Prince
- 1977 - Burwana
- 1976 - Wave King
- 1975 - Gilt Patten
- 1974 - †Toltrice / Itchy Feet
- 1973 - Lord Nelson
- 1972 - Zambari
- 1971 - Abdul
- 1970 - Blue Plume

† Race run in two divisions

== See also ==
- List of Australian Group races
- Group races
