= Queen of the Turf Stakes =

Queen of the Turf Stakes raced as The Coolmore Legacy Stakes
- Class: Group 1
- Location: Royal Randwick Racecourse, Sydney, Australia
- Inaugurated: 1972
- Race type: Thoroughbred – Flat racing
- Sponsor: TAB (2025)

Race information
- Distance: 1,600 metres
- Surface: Turf
- Track: Right-handed
- Qualification: Fillies and mares three year old and older
- Weight: Weight for age
- Purse: A$1,000,000 (2025)

The Queen of the Turf Stakes, raced as The Coolmore Legacy Stakes, is an Australian Turf Club Group 1 Weight for age horse race for fillies and mares aged three years old and upwards, over a distance of 1600 metres at Royal Randwick Racecourse, Sydney in the autumn during the ATC Championships series. It is run on the same day as the Sydney Cup.

== History ==
The race was previously held at Rosehill Racecourse but in 2014 the event was moved to be part of the ATC Championships series at Royal Randwick Racecourse.

=== Distance ===
- 1972 - 1 mile (~1600m)
- 1972–2007 - 1500 metres
- 2008 - 1550 metres
- 2009–2013 - 1500 metres
- 2014 onwards - 1600 metres

=== Grade ===
- 1972–1978 - Principal race
- 1979–1984 - Listed race
- 1985–1990 - Group 3
- 1991–2004 - Group 2
- 2005 onwards - Group 1

=== Venue ===
- 1972–2007 - Rosehill Racecourse
- 2008 - Canterbury Park Racecourse
- 2009–2013 - Rosehill Racecourse
- 2014 onwards - Randwick Racecourse

=== Name ===
- 1972–2015 - Queen Of The Turf Stakes
- 2016 onwards - The Coolmore Legacy Stakes

== Winners ==
The following are winners of the race.

- 2026 - Idle Flyer
- 2025 - Fangirl
- 2024 - Zougotcha
- 2023 - Atishu
- 2022 - Nimalee
- 2021 - Nettoyer
- 2020 - Con Te Partiro
- 2019 - Kenedna
- 2018 - Alizee
- 2017 - Foxplay
- 2016 - Azkadellia
- 2015 - Amanpour
- 2014 - Diamond Drille
- 2013 - Appearance
- 2012 - More Joyous
- 2011 - More Joyous
- 2010 - Typhoon Tracy
- 2009 - Neroli
- 2008 - Forensics
- 2007 - Divine Madonna
- 2006 - Mnemosyne
- 2005 - Ike's Dream
- 2004 - In A Bound
- 2003 - Hosannah
- 2002 - Ugachaka
- 2001 - Sorrento
- 2000 - Danglissa
- 1999 - Camino Rose
- 1998 - Arletty
- 1997 - Kenbelle
- 1996 - Shame
- 1995 - Light Up The World
- 1994 - The Perfume Garden
- 1993 - Excited Angel
- 1992 - Romanee Conti
- 1991 - Ricochet Rosie
- 1990 - Memphis Blues
- 1989 - Special Finish
- 1988 - Chez Paree
- 1987 - Shinakima
- 1986 - Harbor Flo
- 1985 - Casual
- 1984 - Tempestuous
- 1983 - More Rain
- 1982 - C'est Si Bon
- 1981 - Ducatoon
- 1980 - Scomeld
- 1979 - Never Despair
- 1978 - Lady Archon
- 1977 - Piemelon Bay
- 1976 - Visit
- 1975 - Just Topic
- 1974 - Favoured
- 1973 - Millefleurs
- 1972 - Refulgence

== See also ==
- Arrowfield 3YO Sprint
- Australian Oaks
- Percy Sykes Stakes
- Queen Elizabeth Stakes (ATC)
- Sapphire Stakes (ATC)
- South Pacific Classic
- Sydney Cup
- List of Australian Group races
- Group races
