= Sapphire Stakes (ATC) =

- Class: Group 2
- Location: Randwick Racecourse, Sydney, Australia
- Inaugurated: 1998
- Race type: Thoroughbred
- Sponsor: TRESemmé (2026)

Race information
- Distance: 1,200 metres
- Surface: Turf
- Track: Right-handed
- Qualification: Fillies and mares, three years old and older
- Weight: Set weights with penalties
- Purse: $300,000 (2026)

The Sapphire Stakes is an Australian Turf Club Group 2 Thoroughbred horse race for fillies and mares three years old and older, at set weights with penalties, over a distance of 1200 metres, held annually at Randwick Racecourse, Sydney, Australia in the autumn during the ATC Championships series.

== History ==
=== Grade ===
- 1998–2001 - Listed Race
- 2002–2006 - Group 3
- 2007 onwards - Group 2

=== Name ===
In 2010 the race was named as the Lady Sonia McMahon Memorial Stakes in honour of Lady Sonia McMahon, wife of Sir William McMahon, former Prime Minister of Australia who died in April of that year.

== Winners ==
The following are past winners of the race.

- 2026 - In Flight
- 2025 - Infancy
- 2024 - Wee Nessy
- 2023 - Zapateo
- 2022 - Bella Nipotina
- 2021 - Fasika
- 2020 - White Moss
- 2019 - White Moss
- 2018 - Quilista
- 2017 - Secret Agenda
- 2016 - Two Blue
- 2015 - Avoid Lightning
- 2014 - Cosmic Endeavour
- 2013 - Arinosa
- 2012 - Atlantic Jewel
- 2011 - Hurtle Myrtle
- 2010 - Renaissance
- 2009 - Court
- 2008 - Belong to Many
- 2007 - Fire Song
- 2006 - Coolroom Candidate
- 2005 - Glamour Puss
- 2004 - Recurring
- 2003 - Fatoon
- 2002 - Fair Embrace
- 2001 - Spinning Hill
- 2000 - Spinning Hill
- 1999 - †Snippet's Lass
- 1998 - What Can I Say

†In 1999 Little Pattie was first past the post, but later disqualified for returning a positive swab.

== See also ==
- Arrowfield 3YO Sprint
- Australian Oaks
- Percy Sykes Stakes
- Queen Elizabeth Stakes (ATC)
- Queen of the Turf Stakes
- South Pacific Classic
- Sydney Cup
- List of Australian Group races
- Group races
