= Sydney Cup =

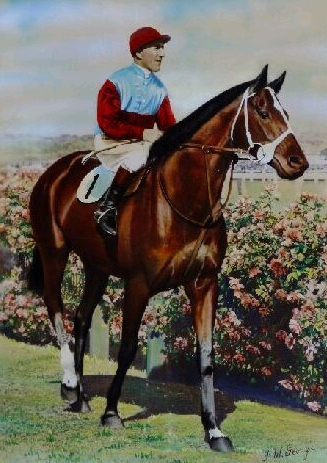
- Lucrative, 1941 winner Maurice McCarten up
- Class: Group I
- Location: Randwick Racecourse; Sydney, Australia
- Inaugurated: 1862 (as Jockey Club Handicap)
- Race type: Thoroughbred – Flat racing
- Sponsor: Schweppes (2005–26)
- Website: Australian Jockey Club

Race information
- Distance: 3,200 metres
- Surface: Turf
- Track: Right-handed
- Qualification: Three year old and older
- Weight: Handicap
- Purse: A$2,000,000 (2026)

The Sydney Cup is an Australian Turf Club Group 1 Thoroughbred handicap horse race, for horses three years old and older, run over 3200 metres at Randwick Racecourse in Sydney, Australia in the autumn during the ATC Championships series and it is the longest race in the club.

The origins of this race are associated with colonial Sydney and the growth of thoroughbred racing in the colony during the 1850s. The Australian Jockey Club initiated an Autumn race meet of initially two days and expanded it as horse racing became the most attended sport meeting.

== Name ==
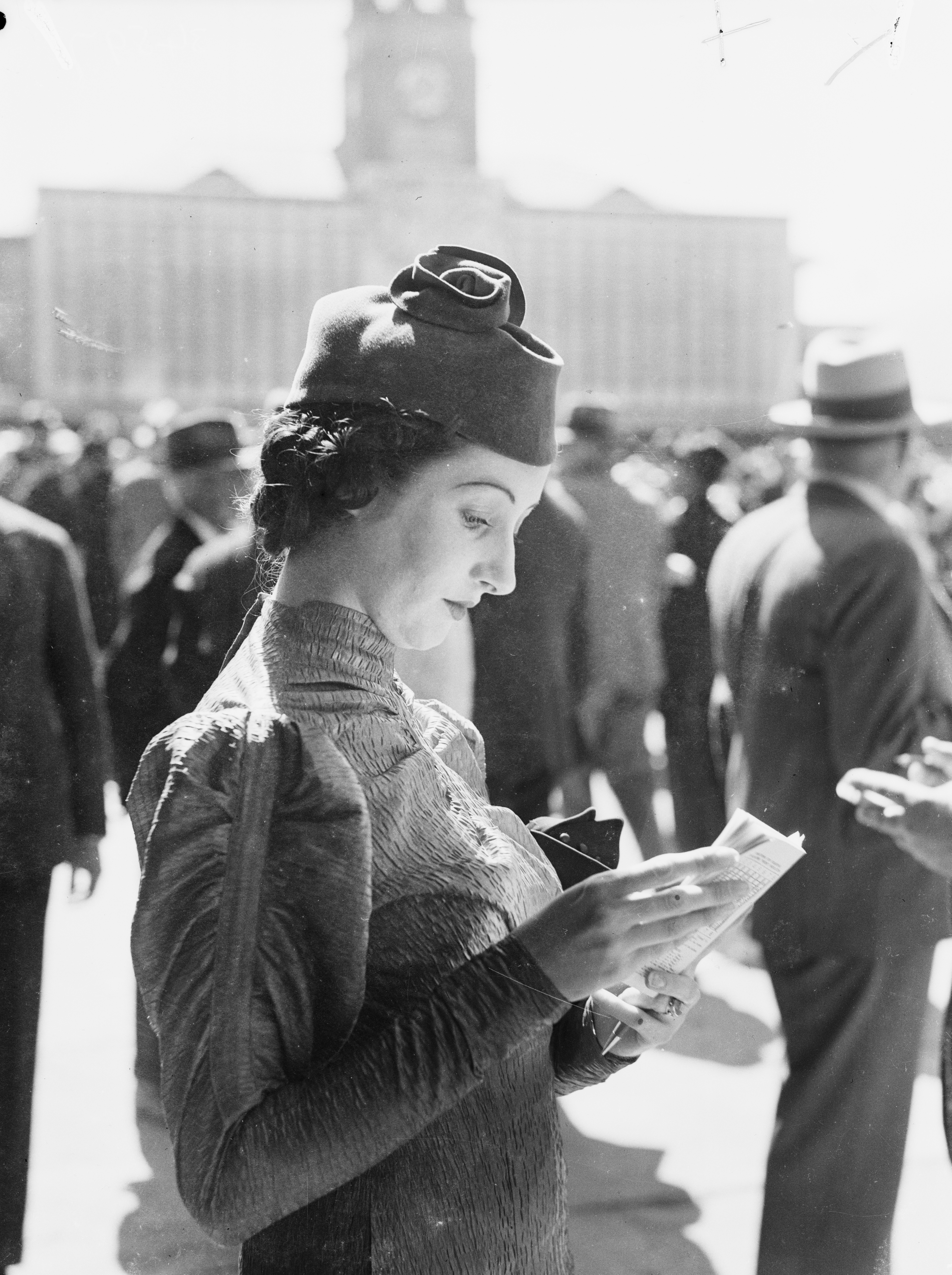
Reading the race guide, Sydney Cup, Randwick Racecourse, 1937

The inaugural running of the race was 1 May 1862 as part of the Metropolitan Autumn Meeting at Randwick. The race was known as Jockey Club Handicap and it was the third race on the card. The race attracted 9 runners over the famed 2 miles and was won by the odds on favourite Talleyrand in a time of 3 minutes 52 seconds.

In 1863 the Randwick Autumn Meeting, the third race on the first day of the meet was the Randwick Grand Handicap. The race was run by five entrants with the winner Traveller in a time of 3 minutes 42 seconds.

By 1865 the race was called the Randwick Grand Handicap Sweepstakes. With influx of money that was being offered by the Victoria Racing Club in Melbourne for the Melbourne Cup the AJC decided to change the name of the race in 1866 to the Sydney Gold Cup and move its scheduling to the second day of the meet. The 1866 Sydney Cup was presented to jockey Samuel Holmes and the immensely popular colonial horse, Yattendon, who demonstrated prowess by winning 11 out of his 17 starts. The gold cup was presented for the first time in this race and was made of 18 carat gold.

Of the more famous horses to win the race was dual winner of the race The Barb (1868–69) and also winner of the Melbourne Cup and from the same era Carbine who also won the race twice (1889–90).

In the 20th century the race held its prominence and although it never overtook the Melbourne Cup the race complemented the Australian Racing Calendar by being held in the autumn.

Other dual winners include: Mosaic (1939–40), Veiled Threat (1942, 1944), Tie The Knot (1998–99).

In 1973 the race was set at a distance of 3,200 metres due to the metric conversion in Australia.

Kingston Town was the first to win the Sydney Cup as a Group 1 race in 1980. The distinction for the fastest recorded time is 3 minutes and 19 seconds, set by 'Apollo Eleven' in 1973 and equalled by Just A Dancer in 1991.

== History ==
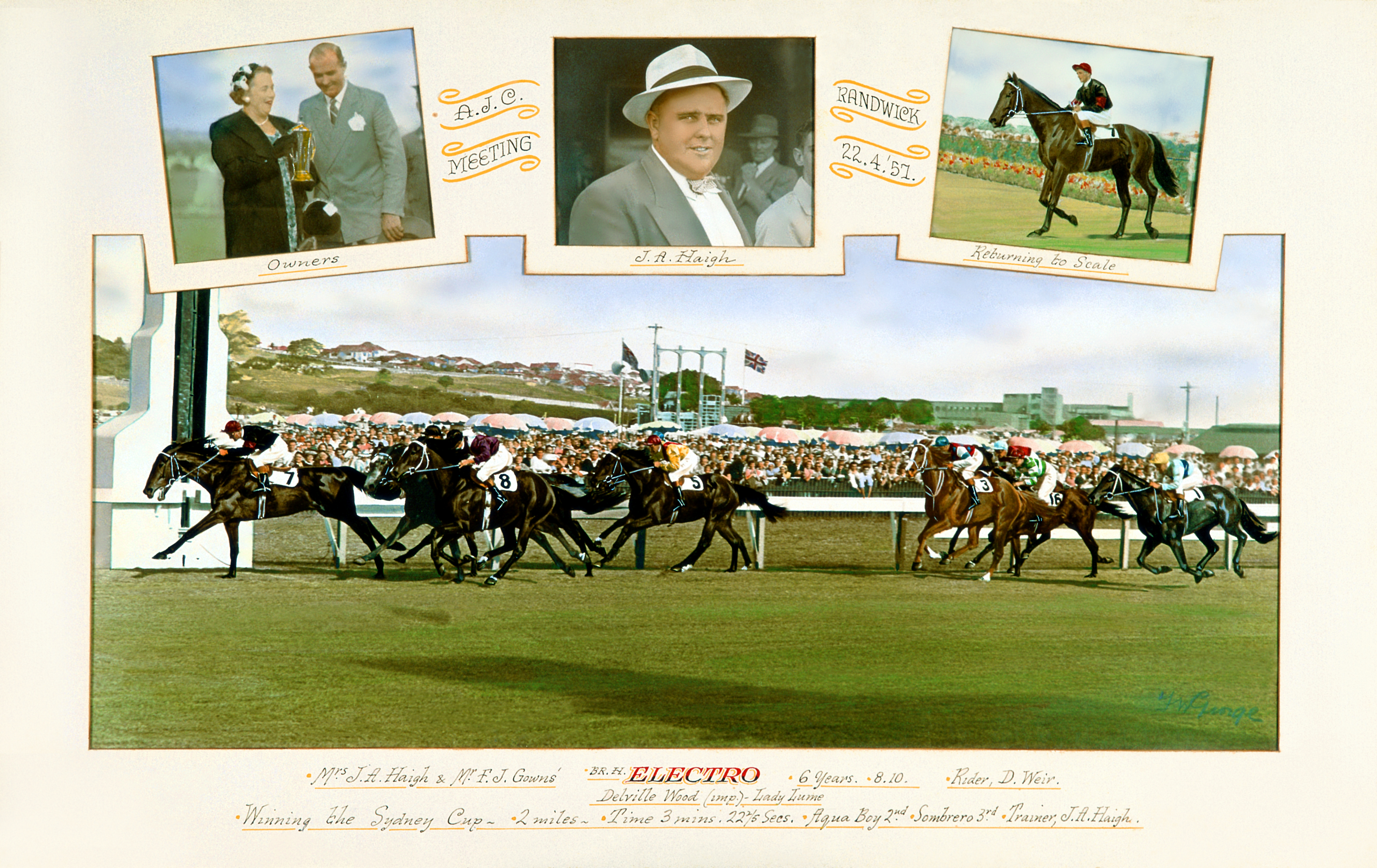
Electro, 1957 winner jockey Doug Weir

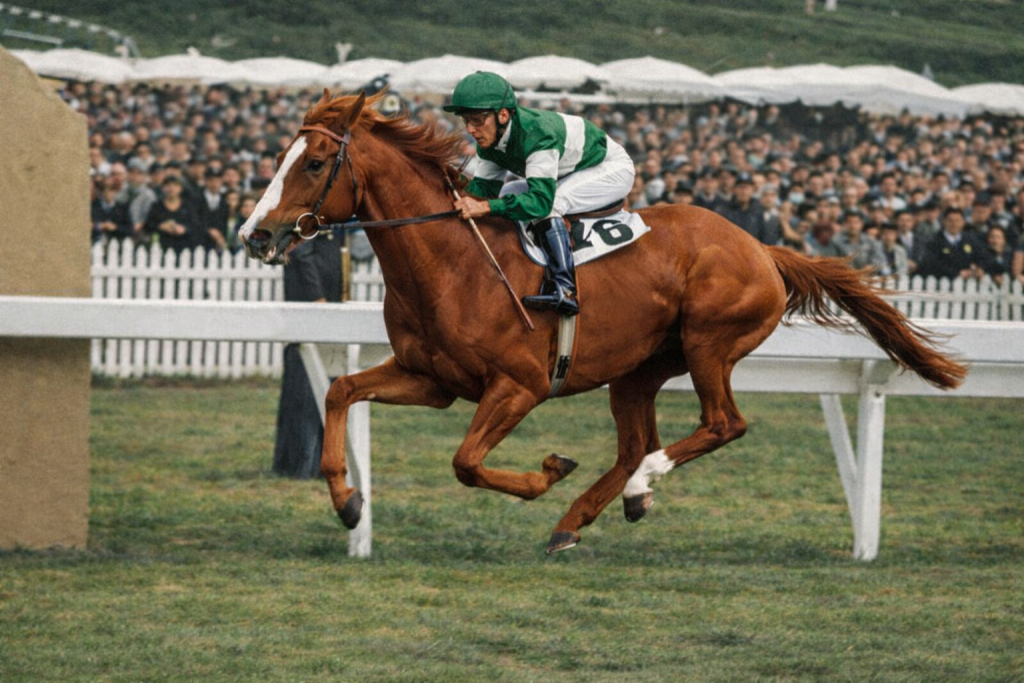
Carbon Copy, 1949 winner N. Sellwood

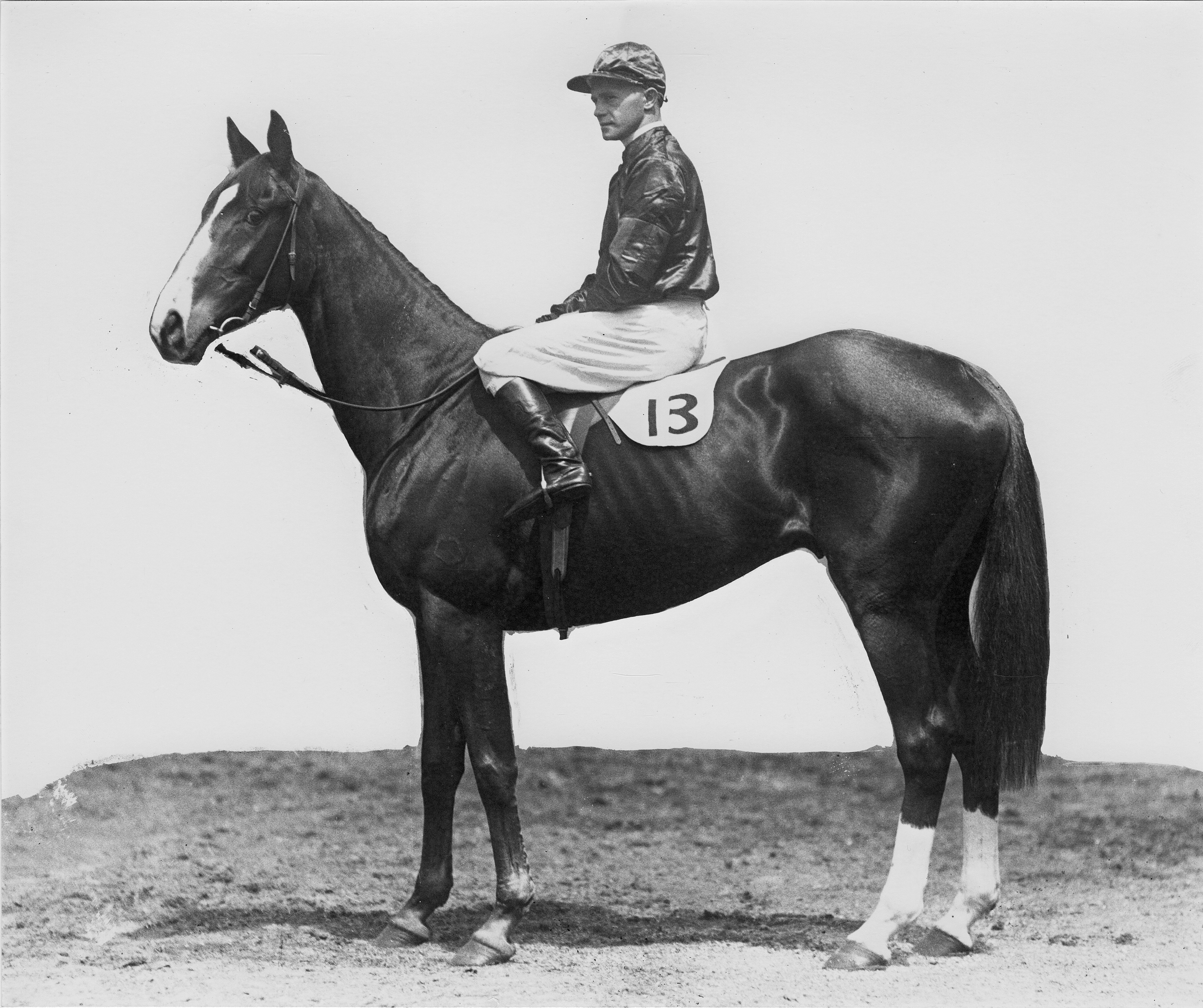
Rogilla, 1933 winner George Robinson

Eurythmic, 1921 winner

=== 1938 and 1941 racebooks ===
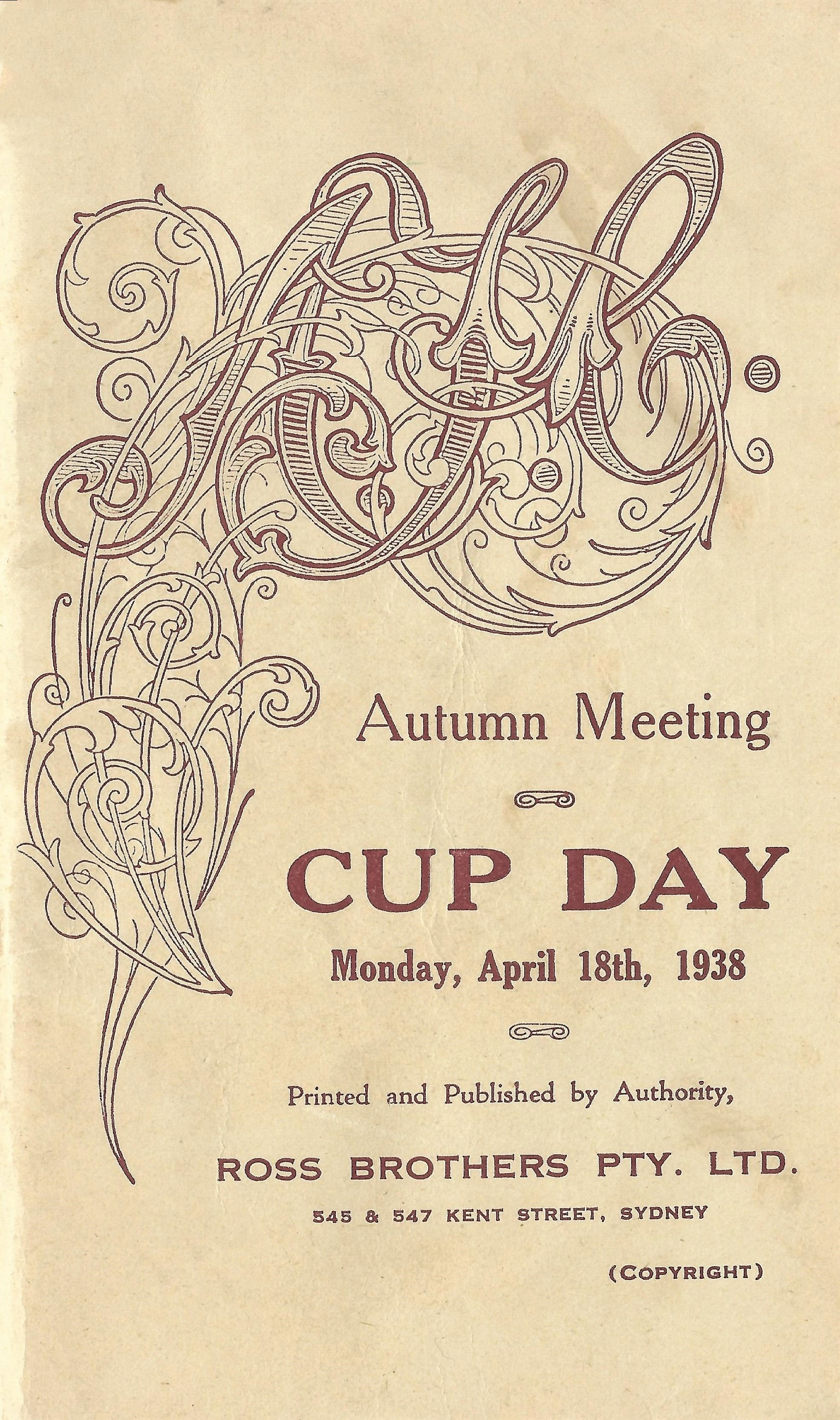
1938 AJC Sydney Cup front cover

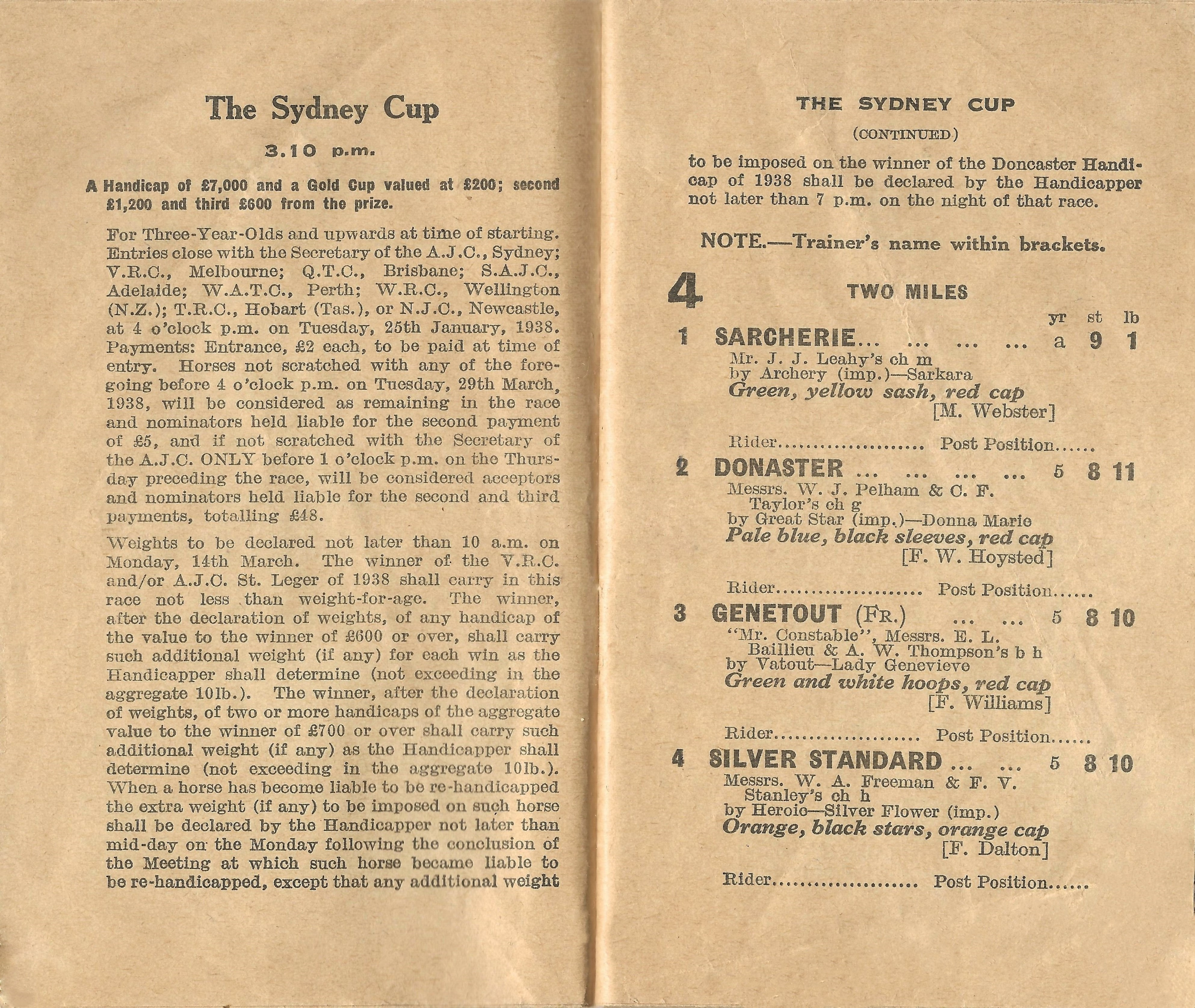
1938 AJC Sydney Cup showing race conditions

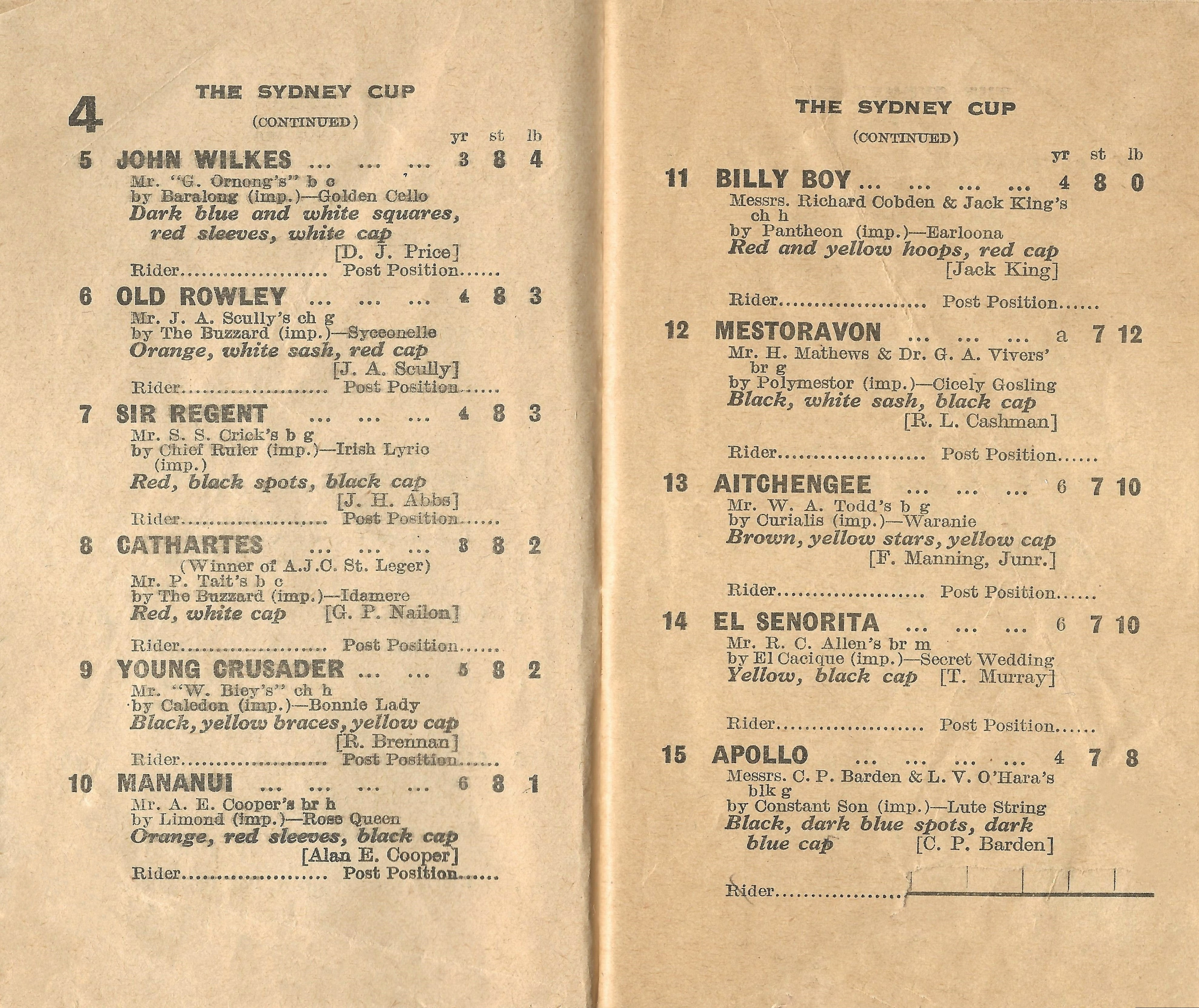
1938 AJC Sydney Cup showing race conditions

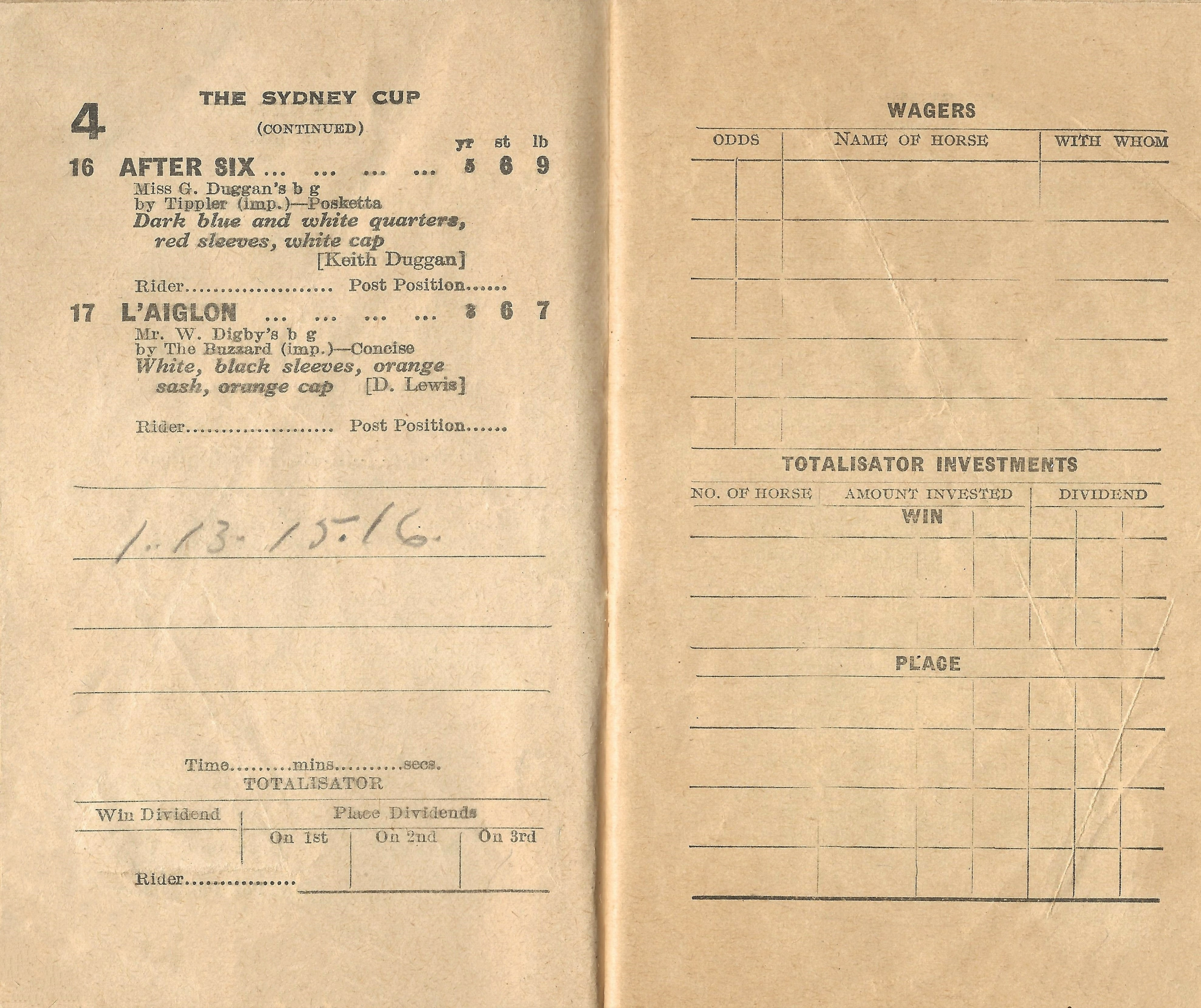
1938 AJC Sydney Cup showing the winner, L'Aiglon

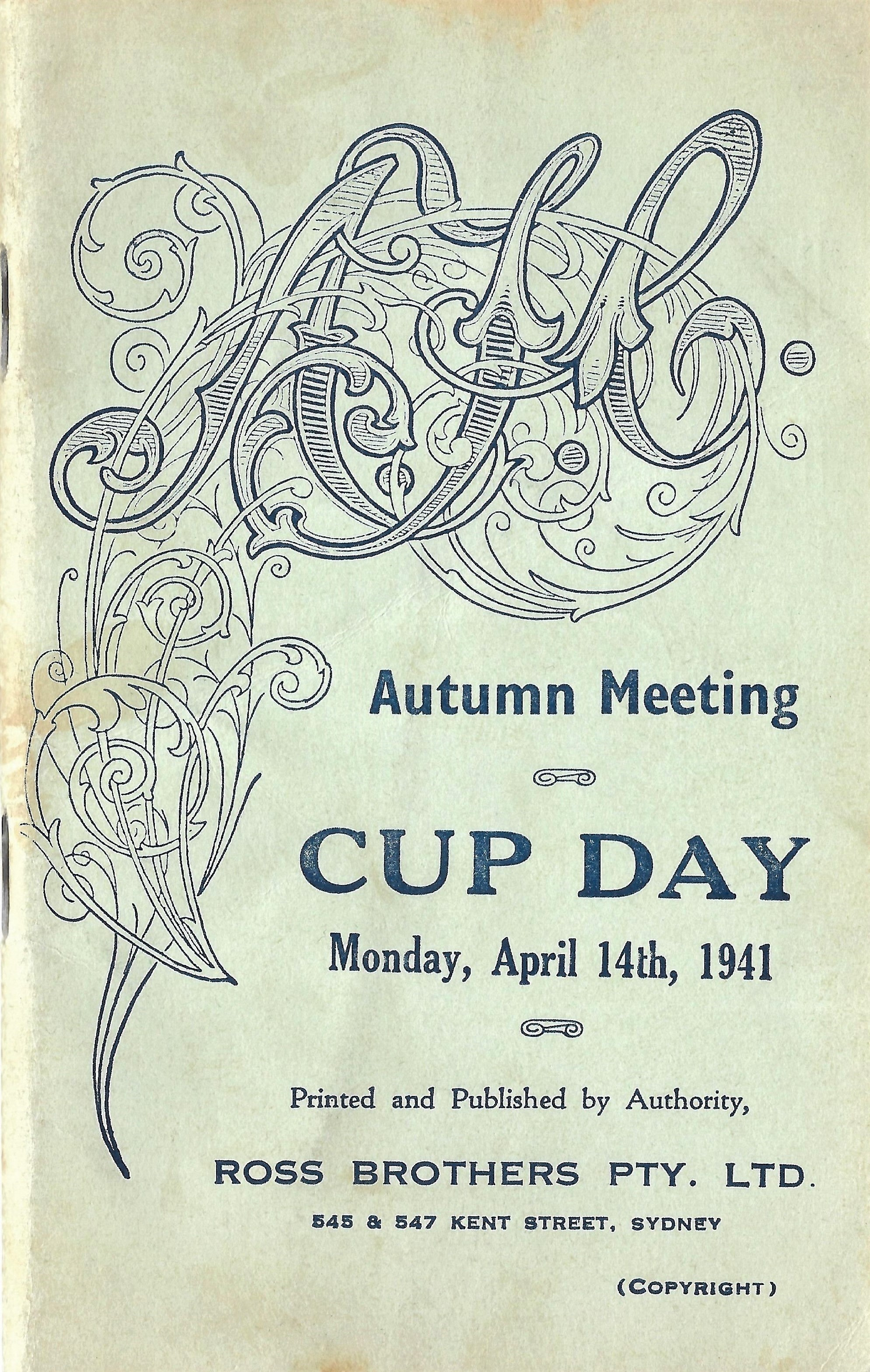
1941 AJC Sydney Cup front cover

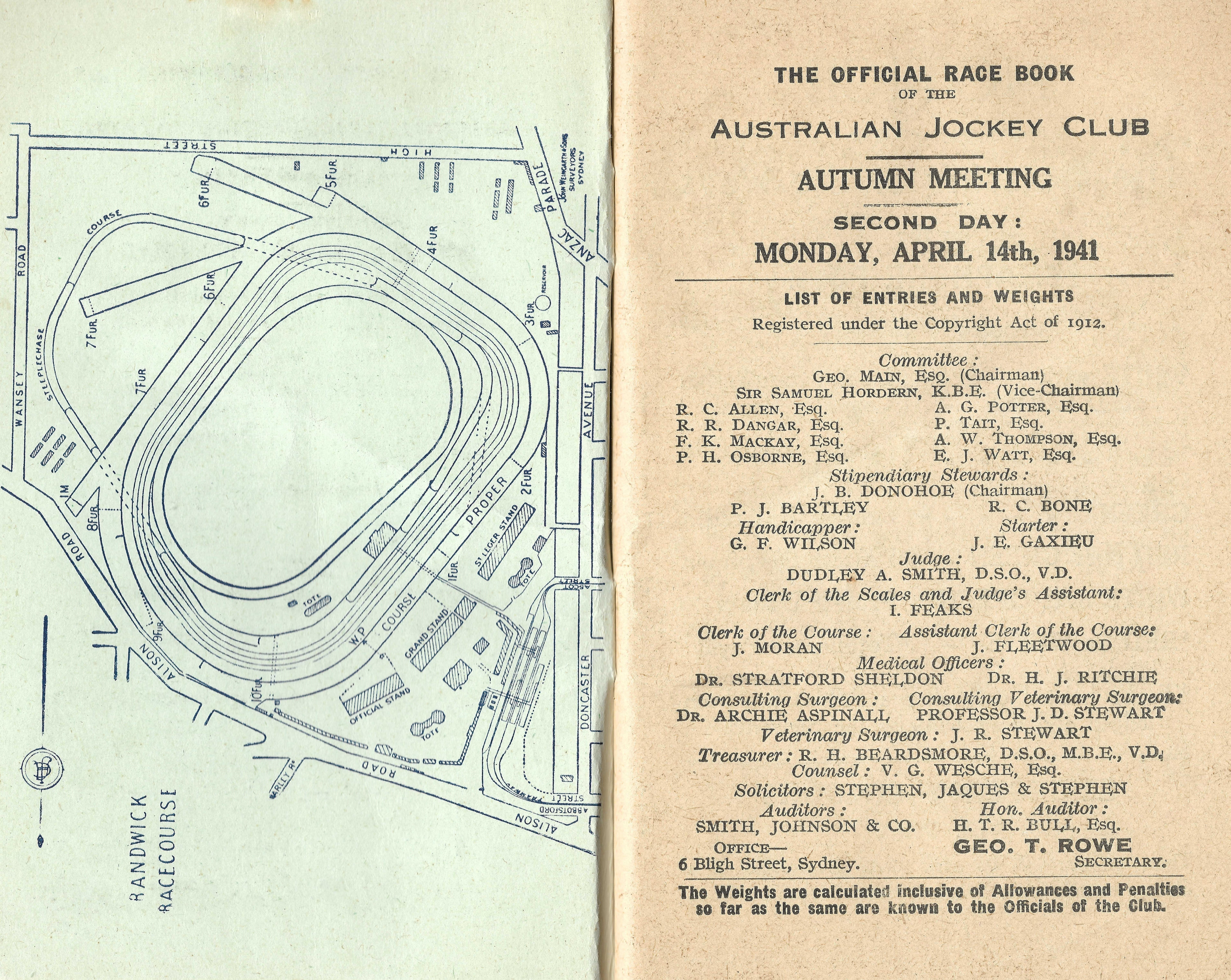
1941 AJC Sydney Cup showing raceday officials

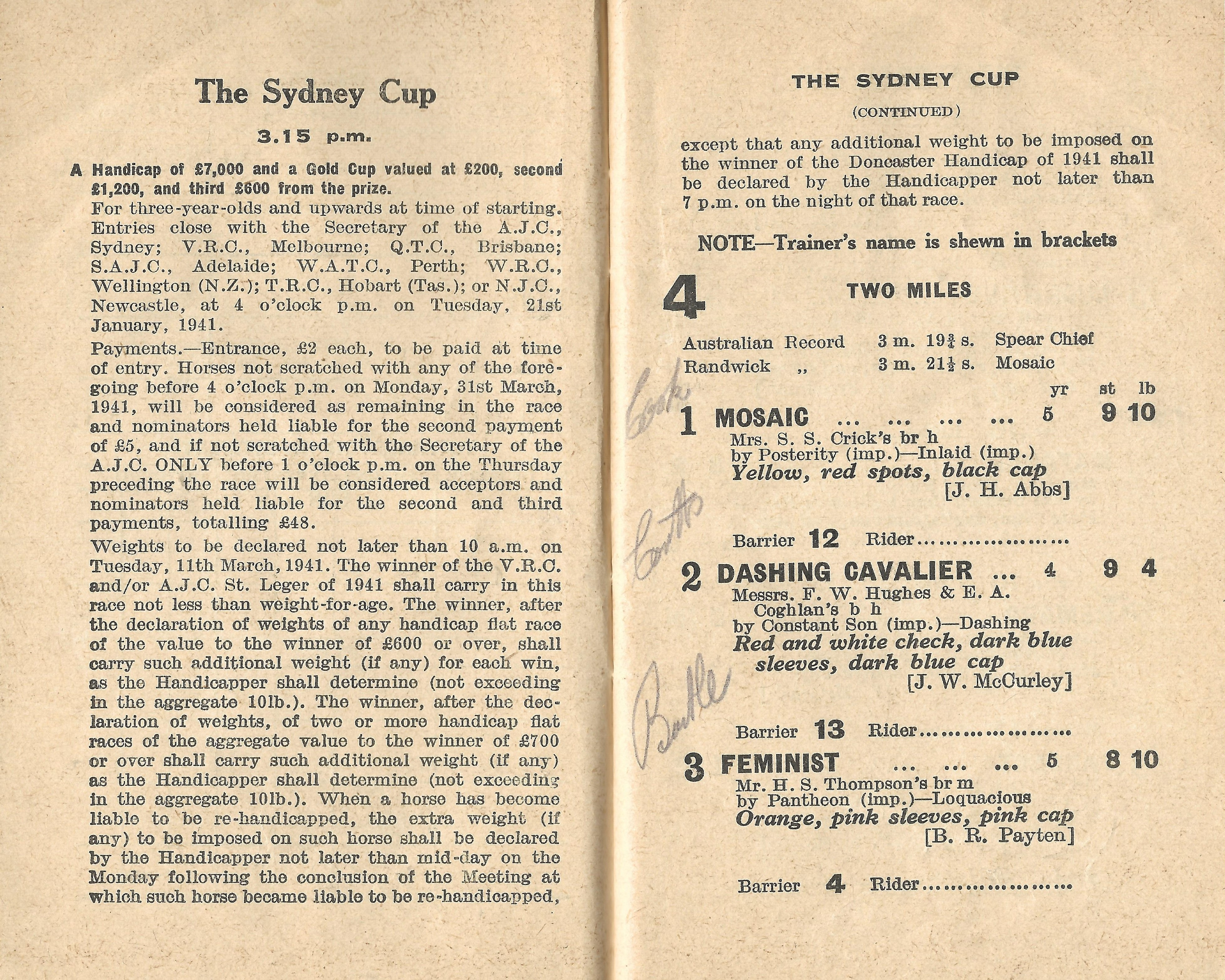
1941 AJC Sydney Cup showing race conditions

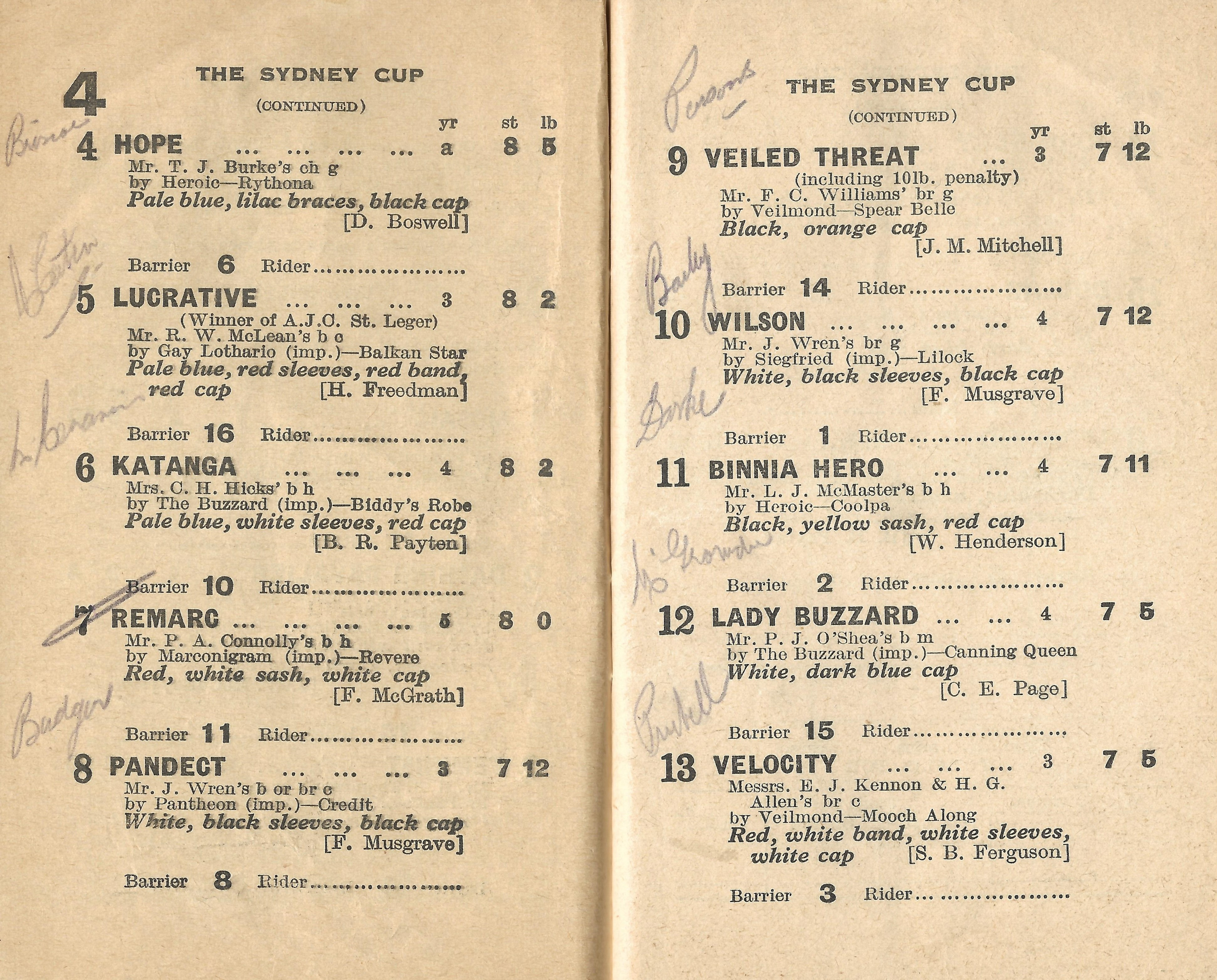
1941 AJC Sydney Cup showing the winner, Lucrative

=== 1942 and 1949 racebooks ===
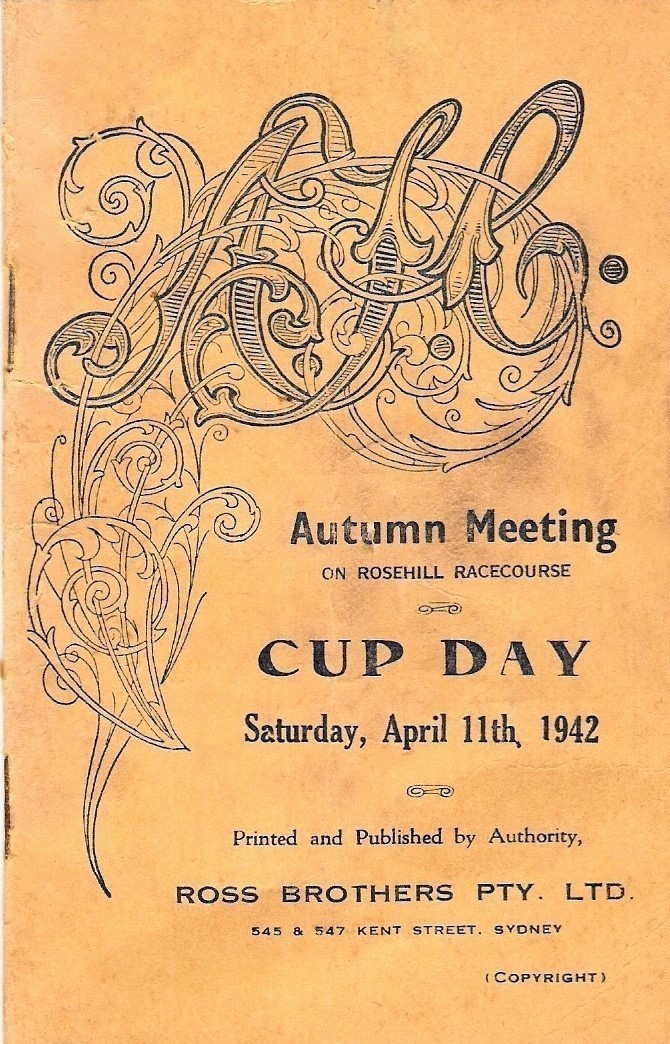
1942 AJC Sydney Cup front cover

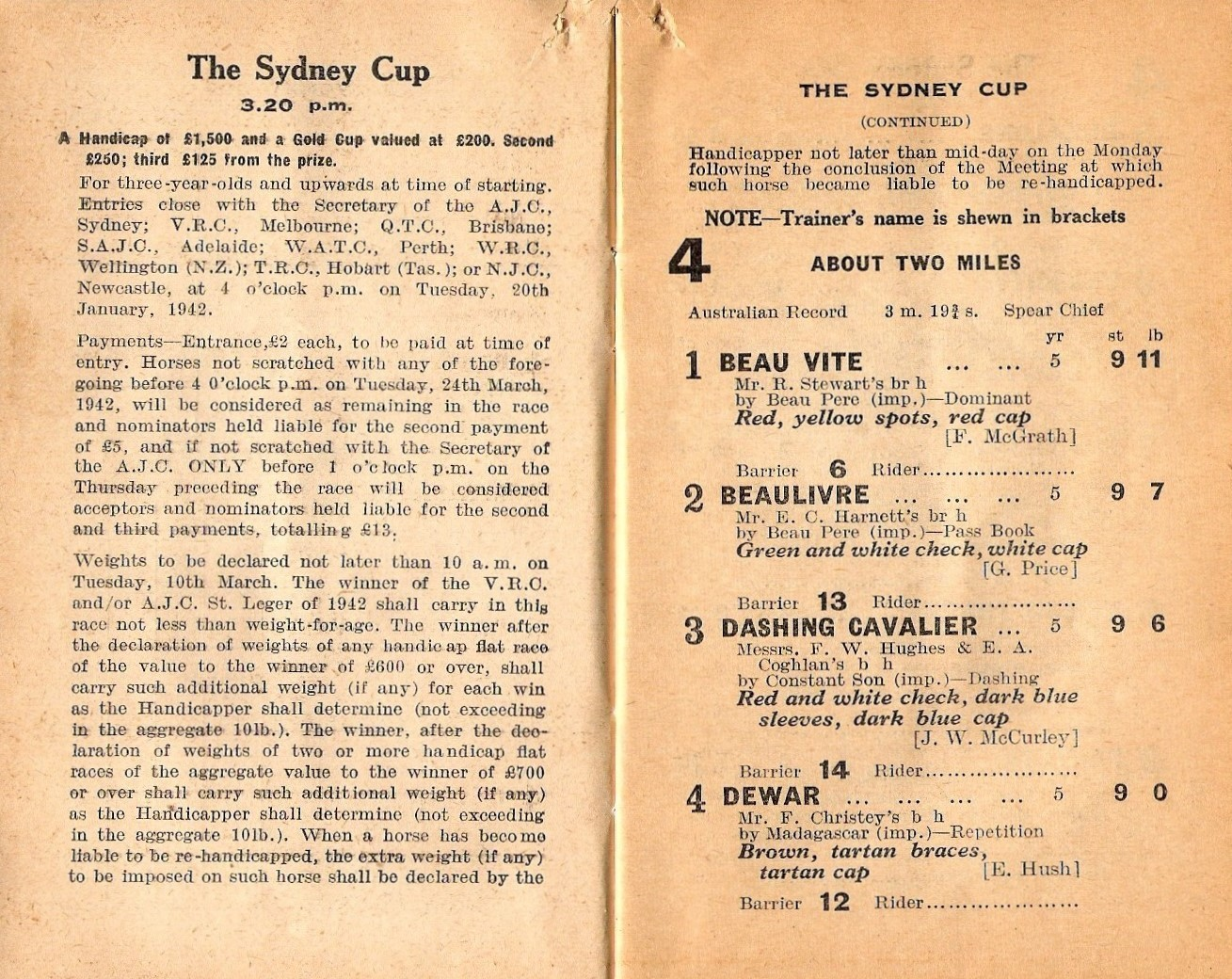
1942 AJC Sydney Cup racebook showing the conditions

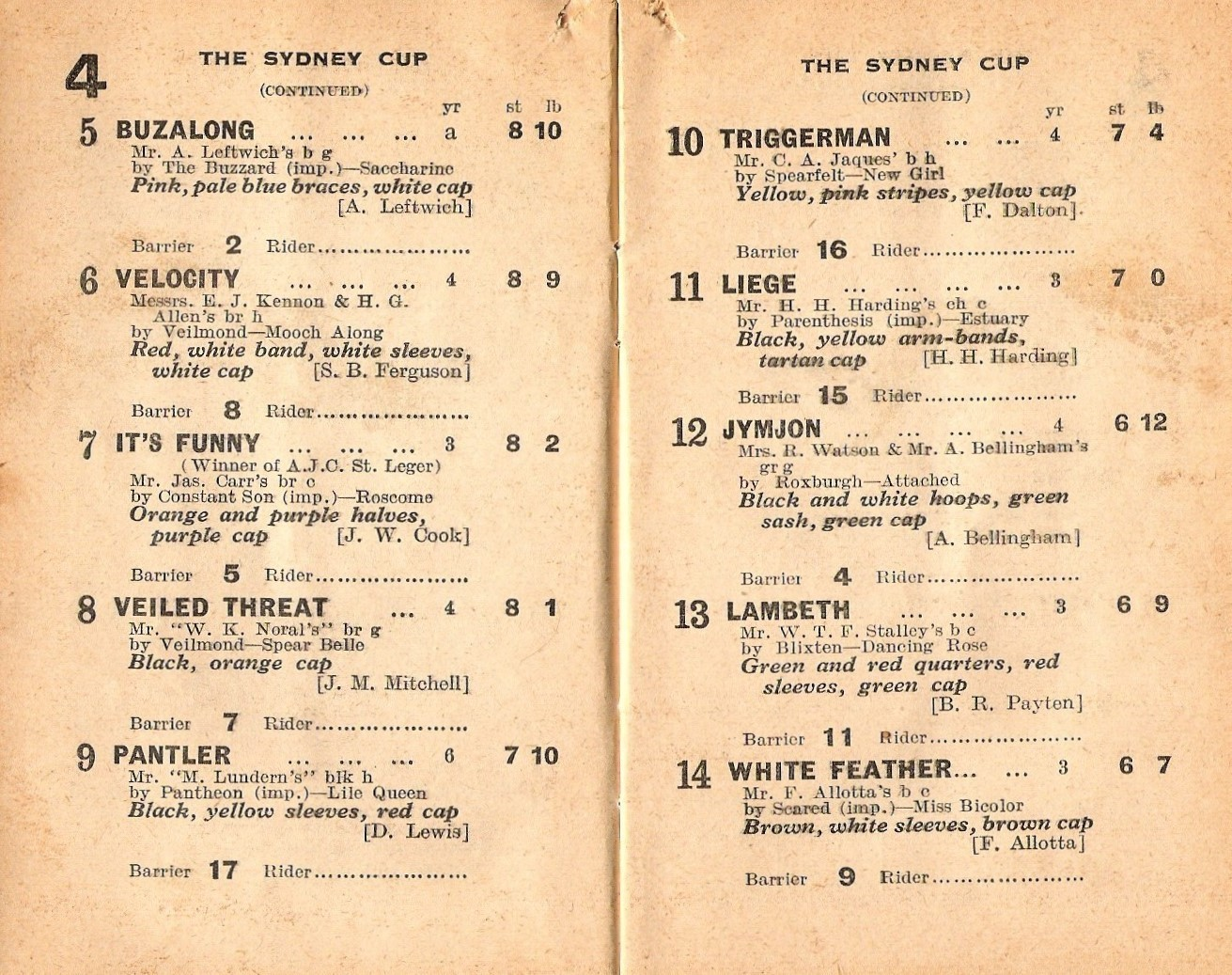
1942 AJC Sydney Cup showing the winner, Veiled Threat

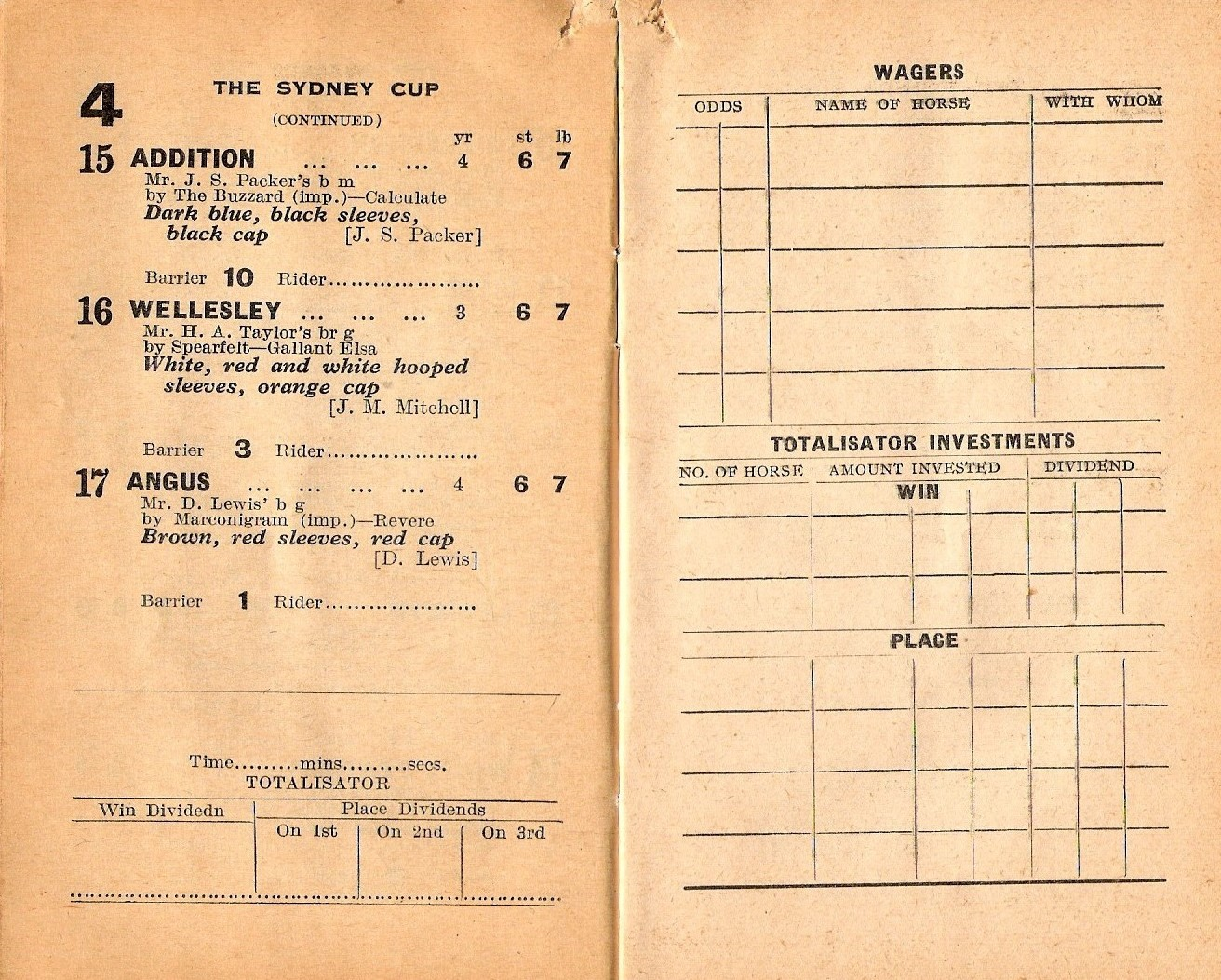
1942 AJC Sydney Cup racebook

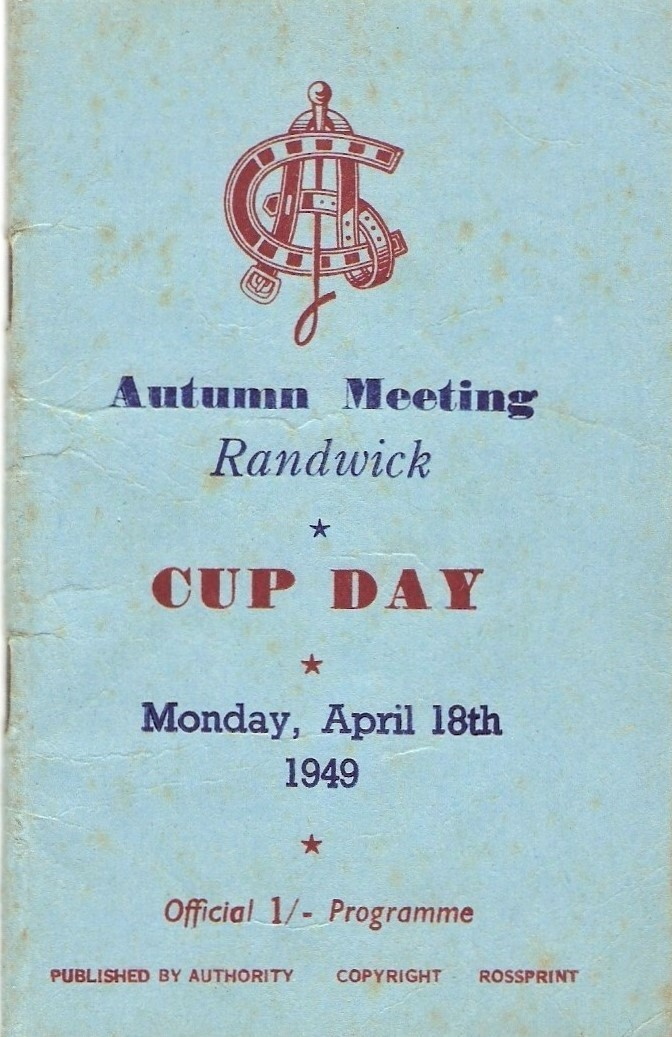
1949 AJC Sydney Cup front cover

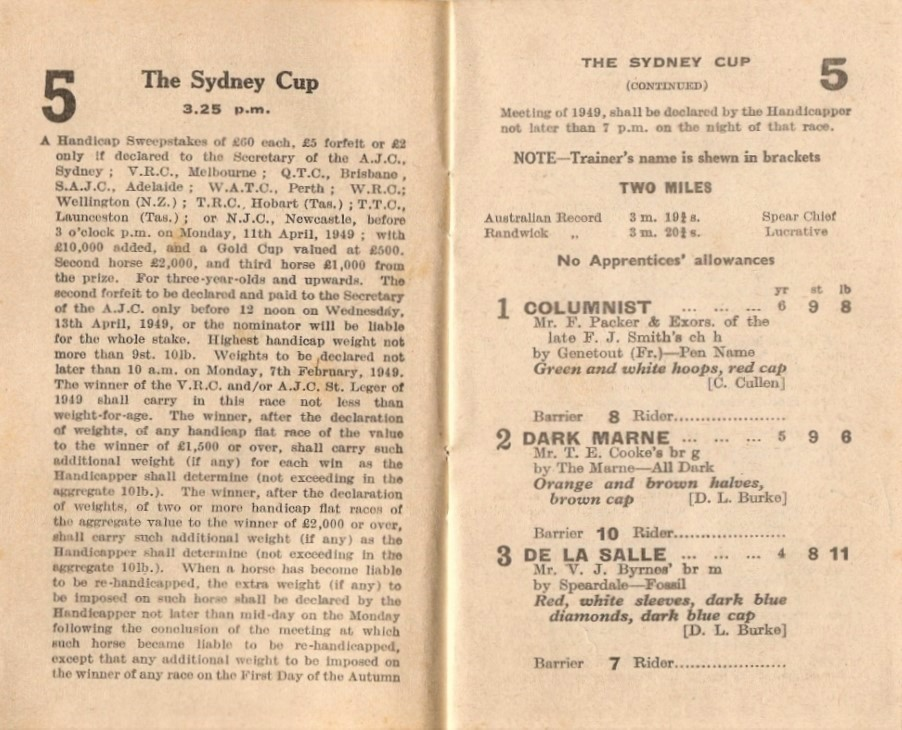
1949 AJC Sydney Cup showing race conditions

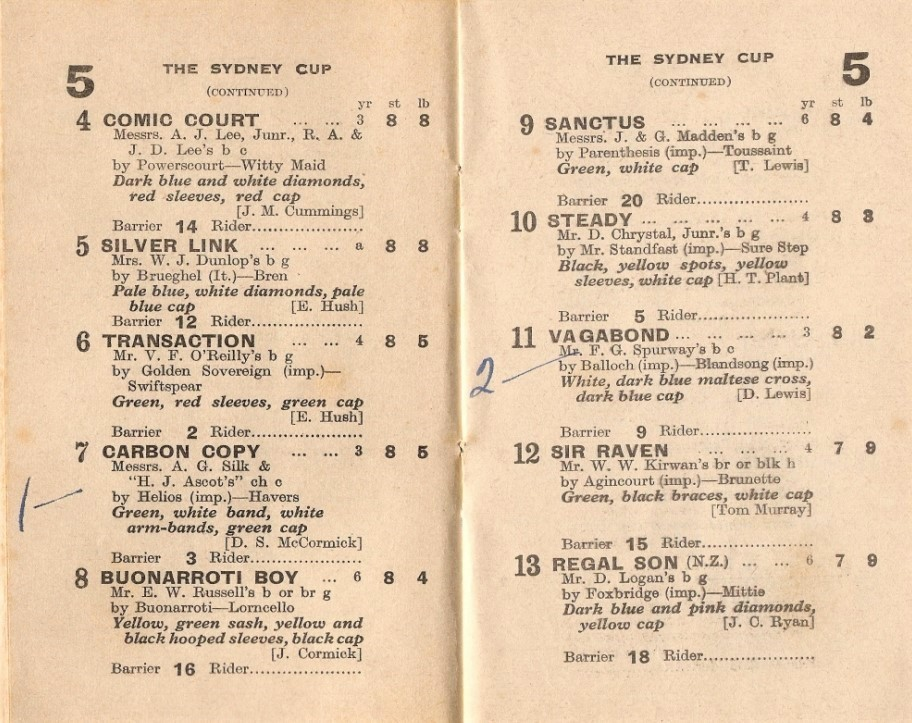
1949 AJC Sydney Cup showing the winner, Carbon Copy

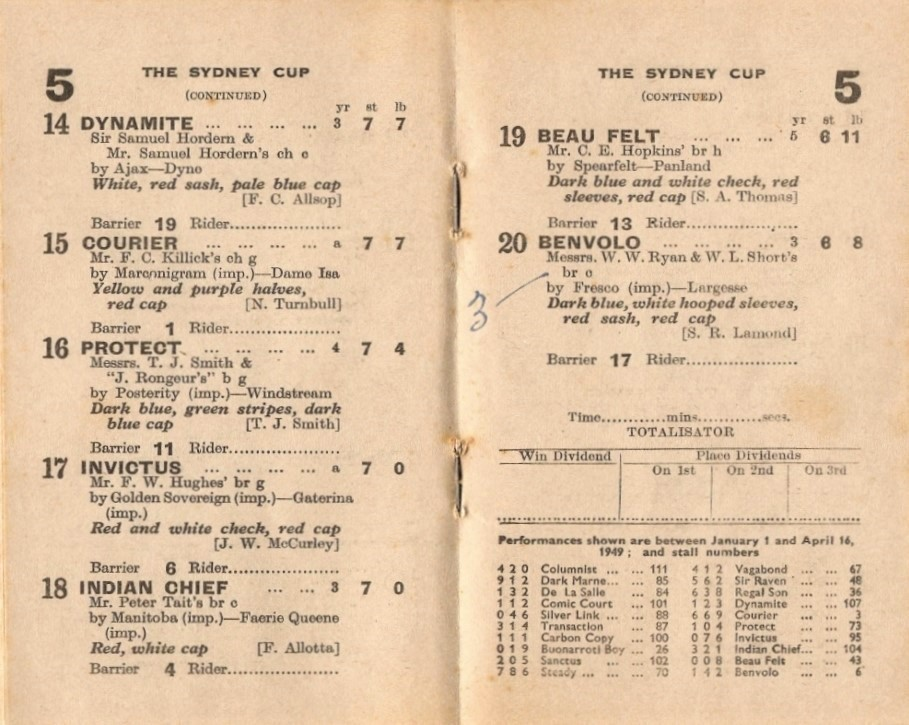
1949 AJC Sydney Cup showing race conditions

=== 1950 and 1952 racebooks ===
1950 AJC Sydney Cup front cover

1950 AJC Sydney Cup showing the conditions

1950 AJC Sydney Cup showing the winner, Sir Falcon

1950 AJC Sydney Cup showing the conditions

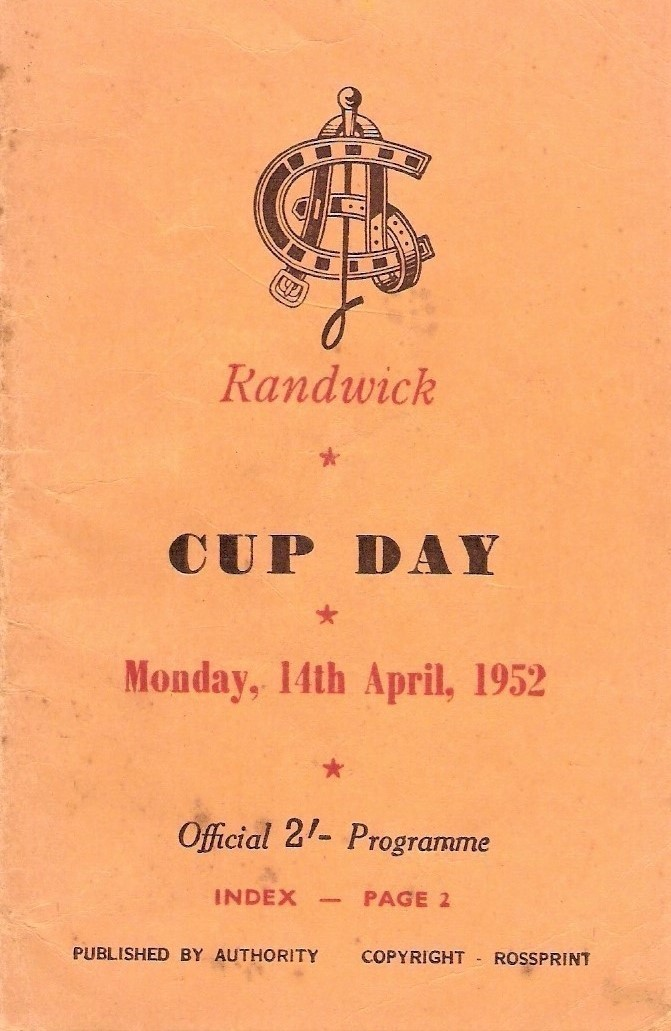
1952 AJC Sydney Cup front cover

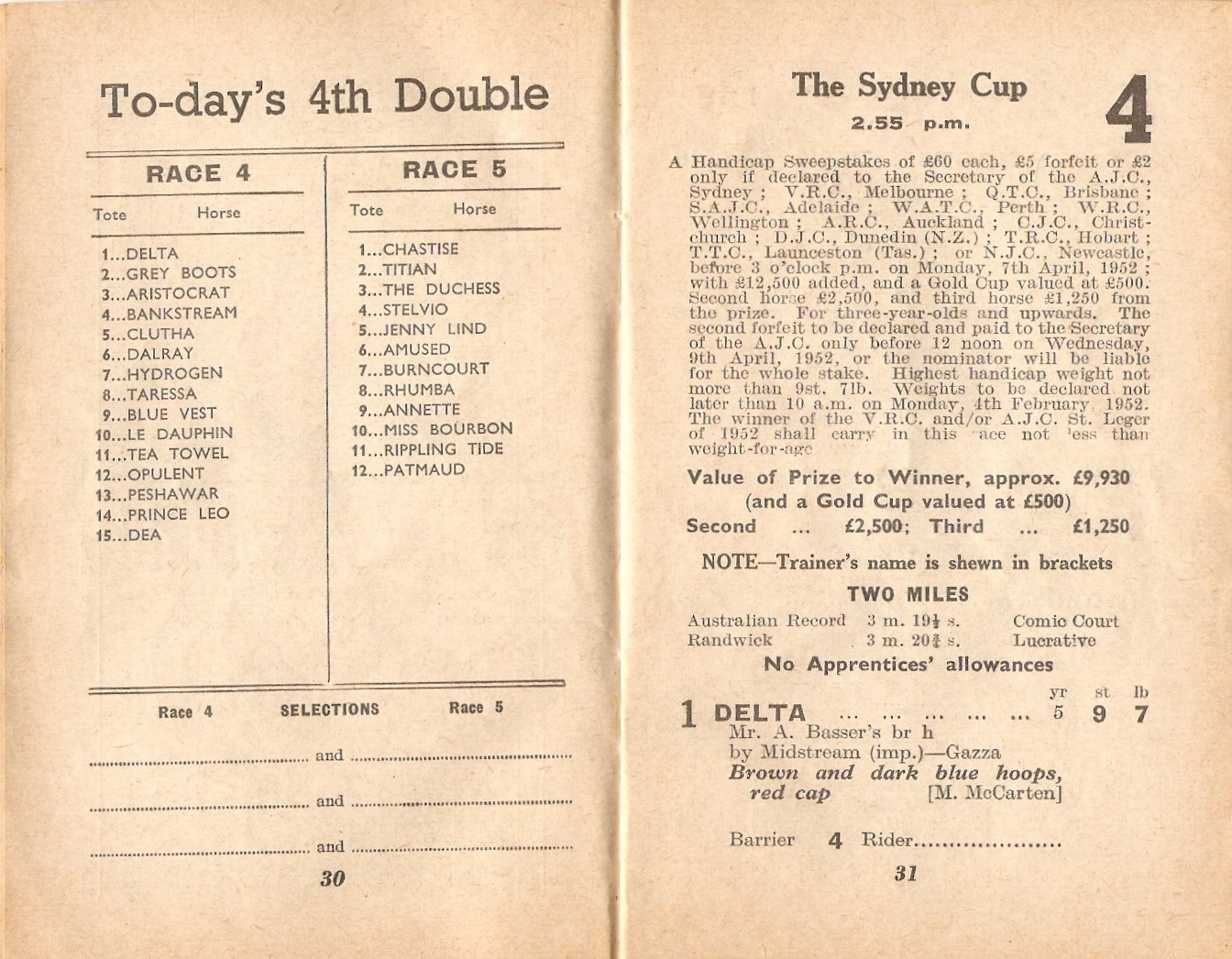
1952 AJC Sydney Cup showing the conditions

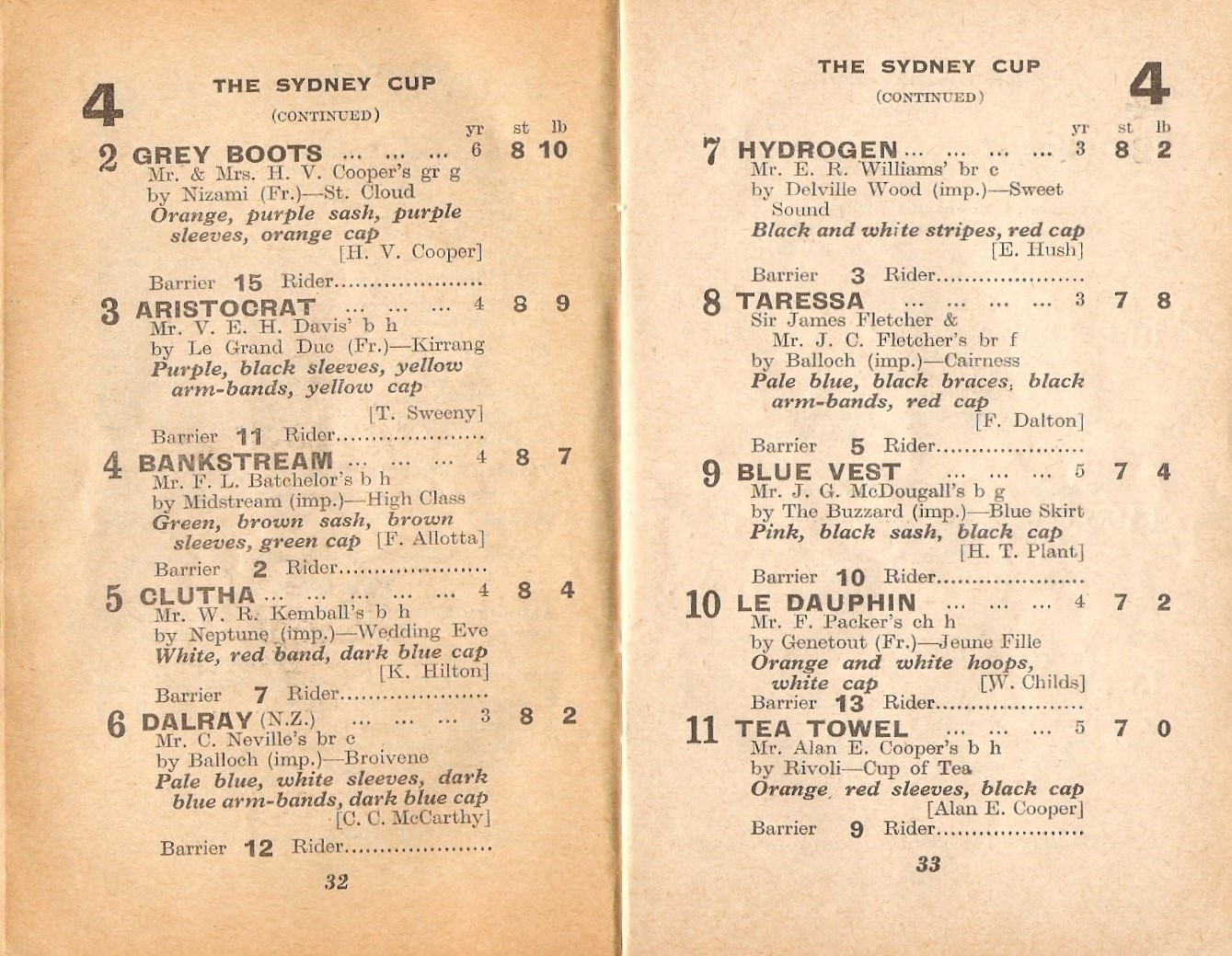
1952 AJC Sydney Cup racebook

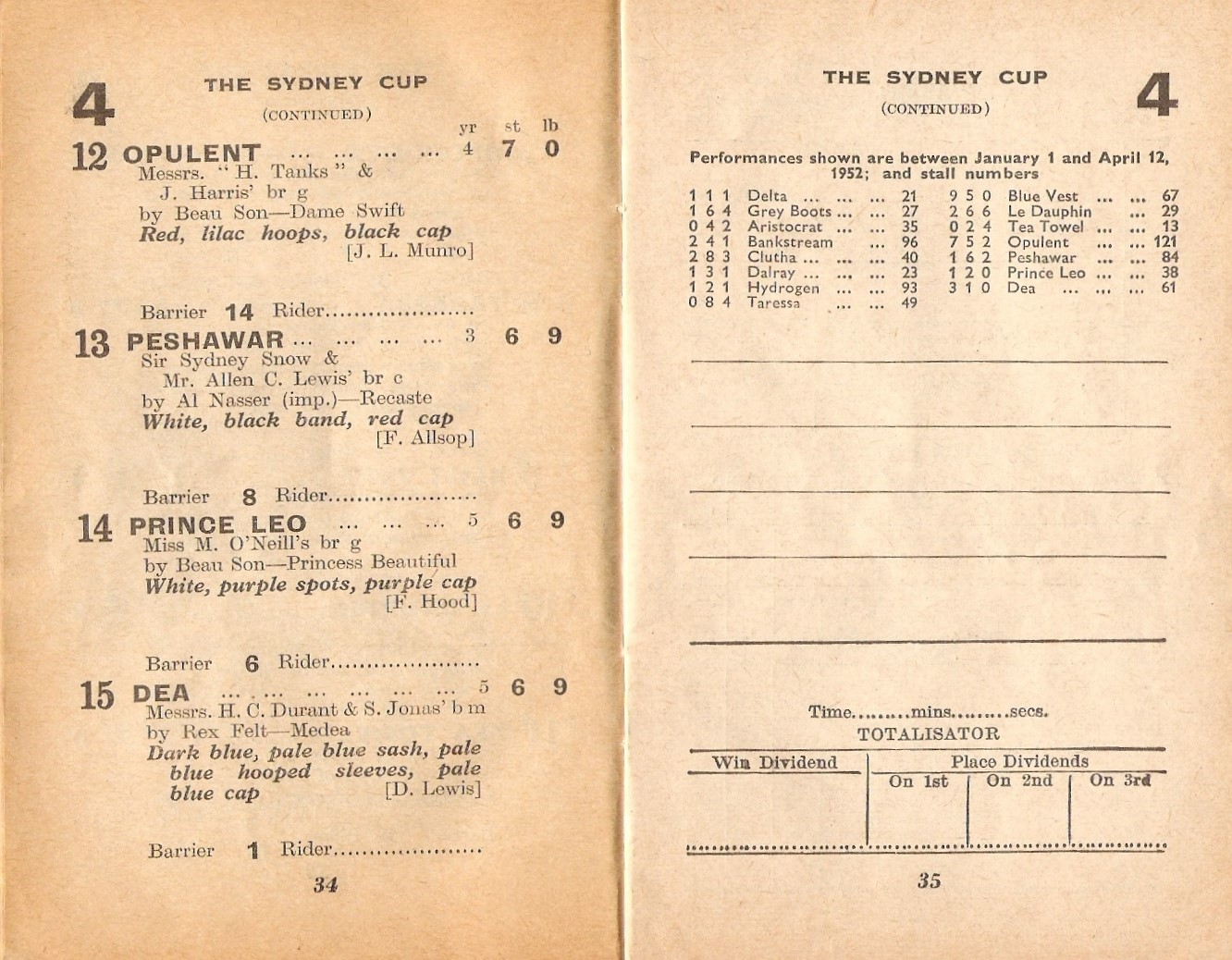
1952 AJC Sydney Cup showing the winner, Opulent

=== 1954 racebook ===
1954 AJC Sydney Cup front cover

1954 AJC Sydney Cup conditions and prizemoney

1954 AJC Sydney Cup showing the winner, Gold Scheme

1954 AJC Sydney Cup showing the conditions

== Winners ==
The following are past winners of the race.

- 2026 – Changingoftheguard
- 2025 – Arapaho
- 2024 – Circle Of Fire
- 2023 – Explosive Jack
- 2022 – Knights Order
- 2021 – Selino
- 2020 – Etah James
- 2019 – Shraaoh
- 2018 – Who Shot Thebarman
- †2017 – Polarisation
- 2016 – Gallante
- 2015 – Grand Marshal
- 2014 – The Offer
- 2013 – Mourayan
- 2012 – Niwot
- 2011 – Stand To Gain
- 2010 – Jessicabeel
- 2009 – Ista Kareem
- 2008 – No Wine No Song
- 2007 – Gallic
- 2006 – County Tyrone
- 2005 – Mahtoum
- 2004 – Makybe Diva
- 2003 – Honor Babe
- 2002 – Henderson Bay
- 2001 – Mr. Prudent
- 2000 – Streak
- 1999 – Tie The Knot
- 1998 – Tie The Knot
- 1997 – Linesman
- 1996 – Count Chivas
- 1995 – Daacha
- 1994 – Cross Swords
- 1993 – Azzaam
- 1992 – My Eagle Eye
- 1991 – Just A Dancer
- 1990 – King Aussie
- 1989 – Palace Revolt
- 1988 – Banderol
- 1987 – Major Drive
- 1986 – Marooned
- 1985 – Late Show
- 1984 – Trissaro
- 1983 – Veloso
- 1982 – Azawary
- 1981 – Our Paddy Boy
- 1980 – Kingston Town
- 1979 – Double Century
- 1978 – My Good Man
- 1977 – Reckless
- 1976 – Oopik
- 1975 – Gay Master
- 1974 – Battle Heights
- 1973 – Apollo Eleven
- 1972 – Dark Suit
- 1971 – Gallic Temple
- 1970 – Arctic Symbol
- 1969 – Lowland
- 1968 – General Command
- 1967 – Galilee
- 1966 – Prince Grant
- 1965 – River Seine
- 1964 – Zinga Lee
- 1963 – Maidenhead
- 1962 – Grand Print
- 1961 – Sharply
- 1960 – Grand Garry
- 1959 – On Line
- 1958 – Straight Draw
- 1957 – Electro
- 1956 – Sailor's Guide
- 1955 – Talisman
- 1954 – Gold Scheme
- 1953 – Carioca
- 1952 – Opulent
- 1951 – Bankstream
- 1950 – Sir Falcon
- 1949 – Carbon Copy
- 1948 – Dark Marne
- 1947 – Proctor
- 1946 – Cordale
- 1945 – Craigie
- 1944 – Veiled Threat
- 1943 – Abspear
- 1942 – Veiled Threat
- 1941 – Lucrative
- 1940 – Mosaic
- 1939 – Mosaic
- 1938 – L'Aiglon
- 1937 – Mestoravon
- 1936 – Contact
- 1935 – Akuna
- 1934 – Broad Arrow
- 1933 – Rogilla
- 1932 – Johnnie Jason
- 1931 – The Dimmer
- 1930 – Gwillian G.
- 1929 – Crucis
- 1928 – Winalot
- 1927 – Piastoon
- 1926 – Murray King
- 1925 – Lilypond
- 1924 – Scarlet
- 1923 – David
- 1922 – Prince Charles
- 1921 – Eurythmic
- 1920 – Kennaquhair
- 1919 – Ian 'Or
- 1918 – Rebus
- 1917 – The Fortune Hunter
- 1916 – Prince Bardolph
- 1915 – Scotch Artillery
- 1914 – Lilyveil
- 1913 – Cadonia
- 1912 – Saxonite
- 1911 – Moorilla
- 1910 – Vavasor
- 1909 – Trafalgar
- 1908 – Dyed Garments
- 1907 – Realm
- 1906 – Noreen
- 1905 – Tartan
- 1904 – Lord Cardigan
- 1903 – Street Arab
- 1902 – Wakeful
- 1901 – San Fran
- 1900 – La Carabine
- 1899 – Diffidence
- 1898 – Merloolas
- 1897 – Tricolor
- 1896 – Wallace
- 1895 – Patroness
- 1894 – Lady Trenton
- 1893 – Realm
- 1892 – Stromboli
- 1891 – Highborn
- 1890 – Carbine
- 1889 – Carbine
- 1888 – The Australian Peer
- 1887 – Frisco
- 1886 – Cerise And Blue
- 1885 – Normanby
- 1884 – Favo
- 1883 – Darebin
- 1882 – Cunnamulla
- 1881 – Progress
- 1880 – Petrea
- 1879 – Savanaka
- 1878 – Democrat
- 1877 – Kingfisher
- 1876 – A.T.
- 1875 – Imperial
- 1874 – Speculation
- 1873 – Vixen
- 1872 – The Prophet
- 1871 – Mermaid
- 1870 – Barbelle
- 1869 – The Barb
- 1868 – The Barb
- 1867 – Fishhook
- 1866 – Yattendon
- 1865 – Union Jack
- 1864 – Tarragon
- 1863 – Traveller
- 1862 – Talleyrand

Notes:
† The event was originally scheduled on 8 April 2017, but was abandoned when Almoonqith broke down shortly after the start of the race. The race was rescheduled and run two weeks later on 22 April 2017.

== See also ==
- Arrowfield 3YO Sprint
- Australian Oaks
- Percy Sykes Stakes
- Queen Elizabeth Stakes (ATC)
- Queen of the Turf Stakes
- Sapphire Stakes (ATC)
- South Pacific Classic
- List of Australian Group races
- Group races
