= Randwick Racecourse =

Australian horse racecourse

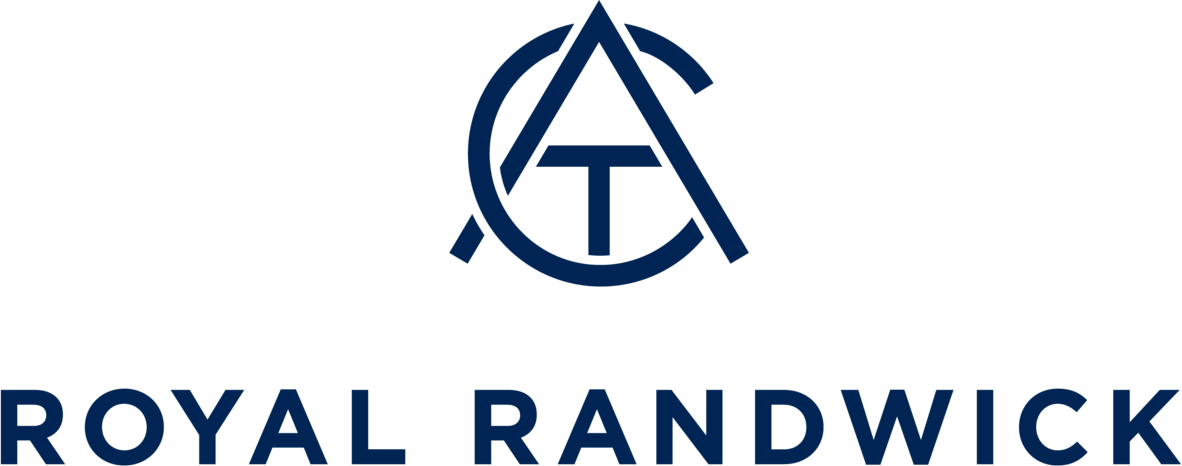

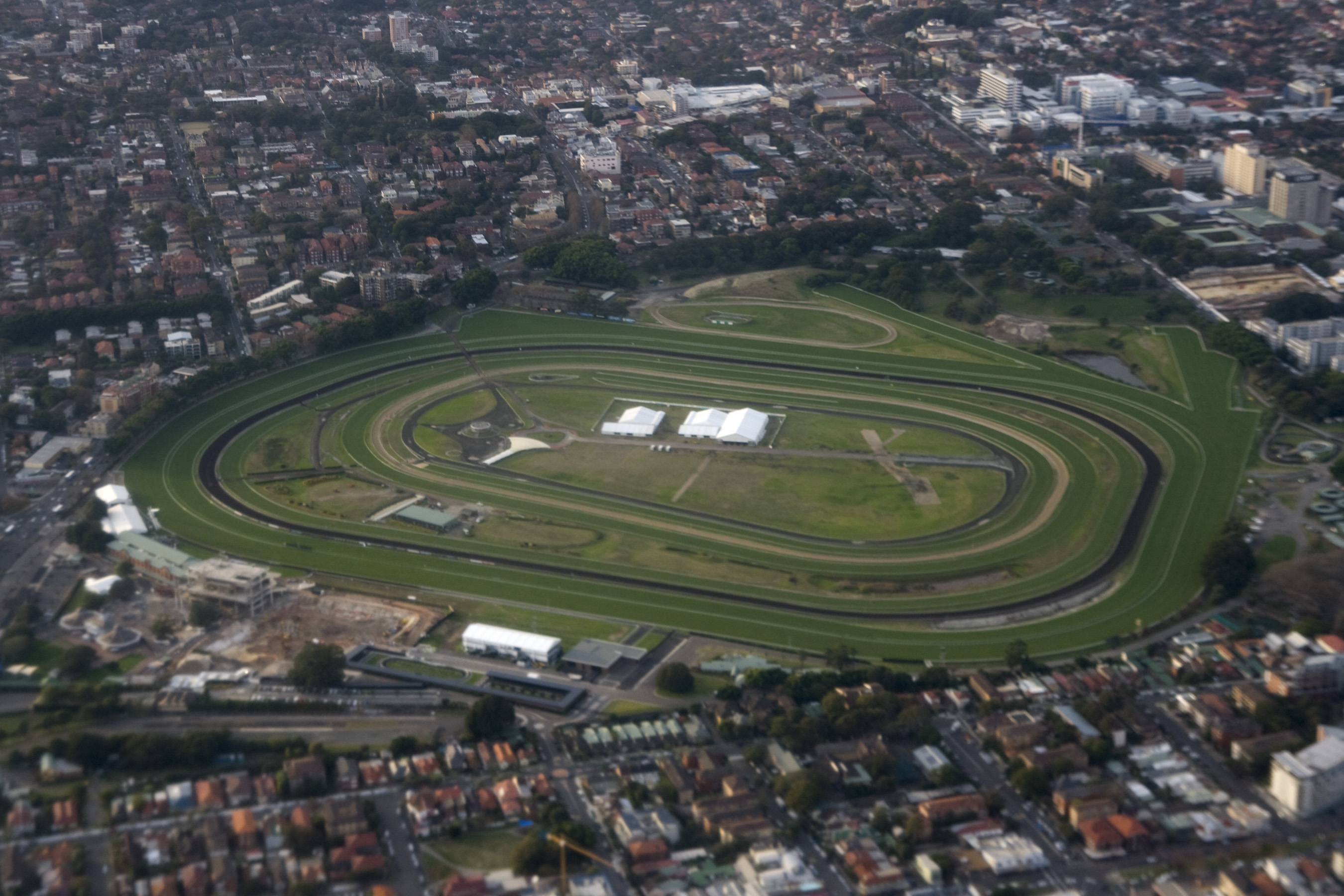
- Randwick Racecourse from above in 2012
- Interactive map of Randwick Racecourse
- Location: Eastern Suburbs, Sydney, New South Wales
- Coordinates: 33°54′39″S 151°13′49″E
- Owned by: Australian Turf Club
- Date opened: 1833
- Notable races: The Everest; Australian Derby; Doncaster Handicap; Queen Elizabeth Stakes

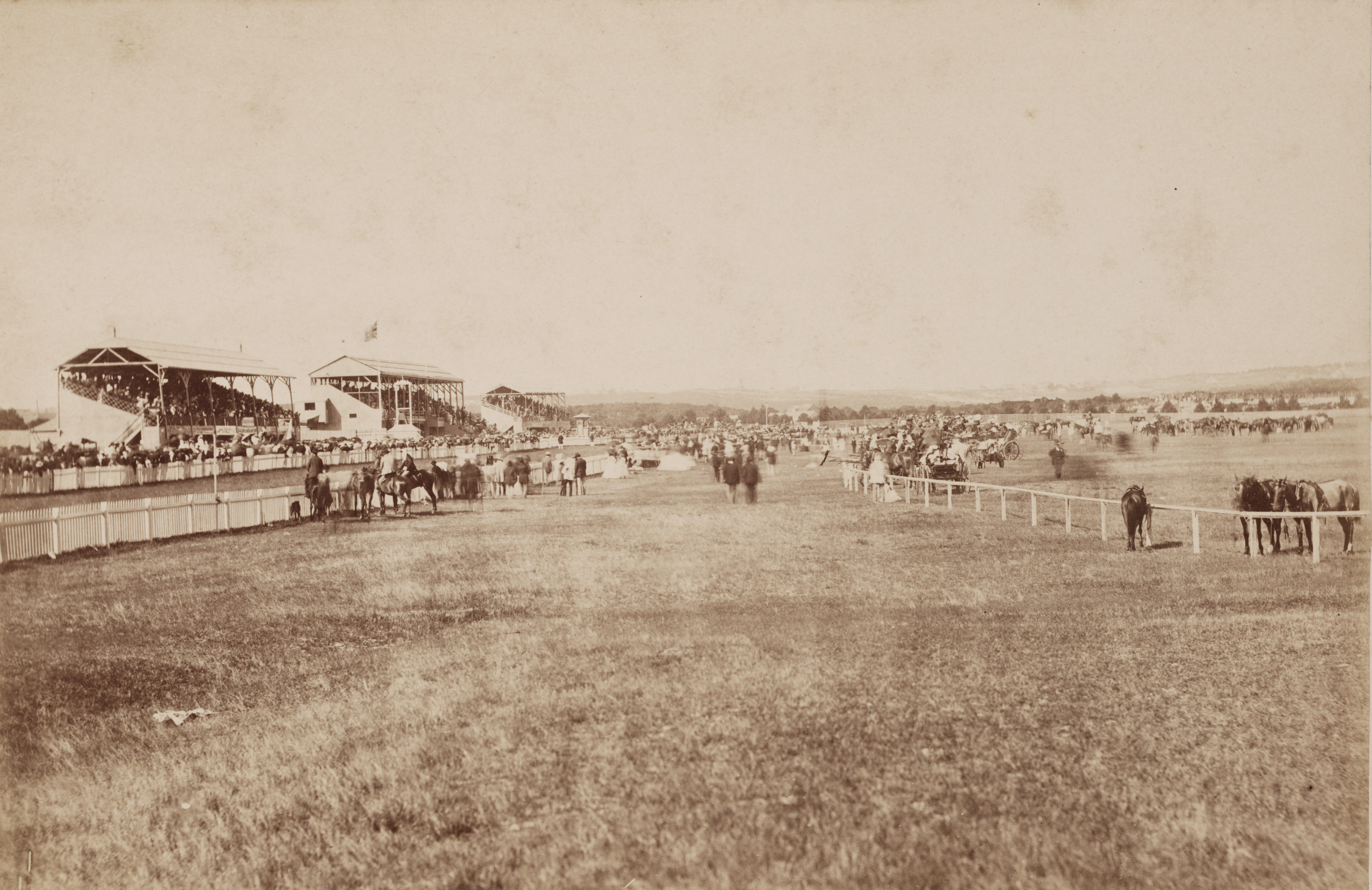
Randwick Racecourse, Sydney, c. 1872

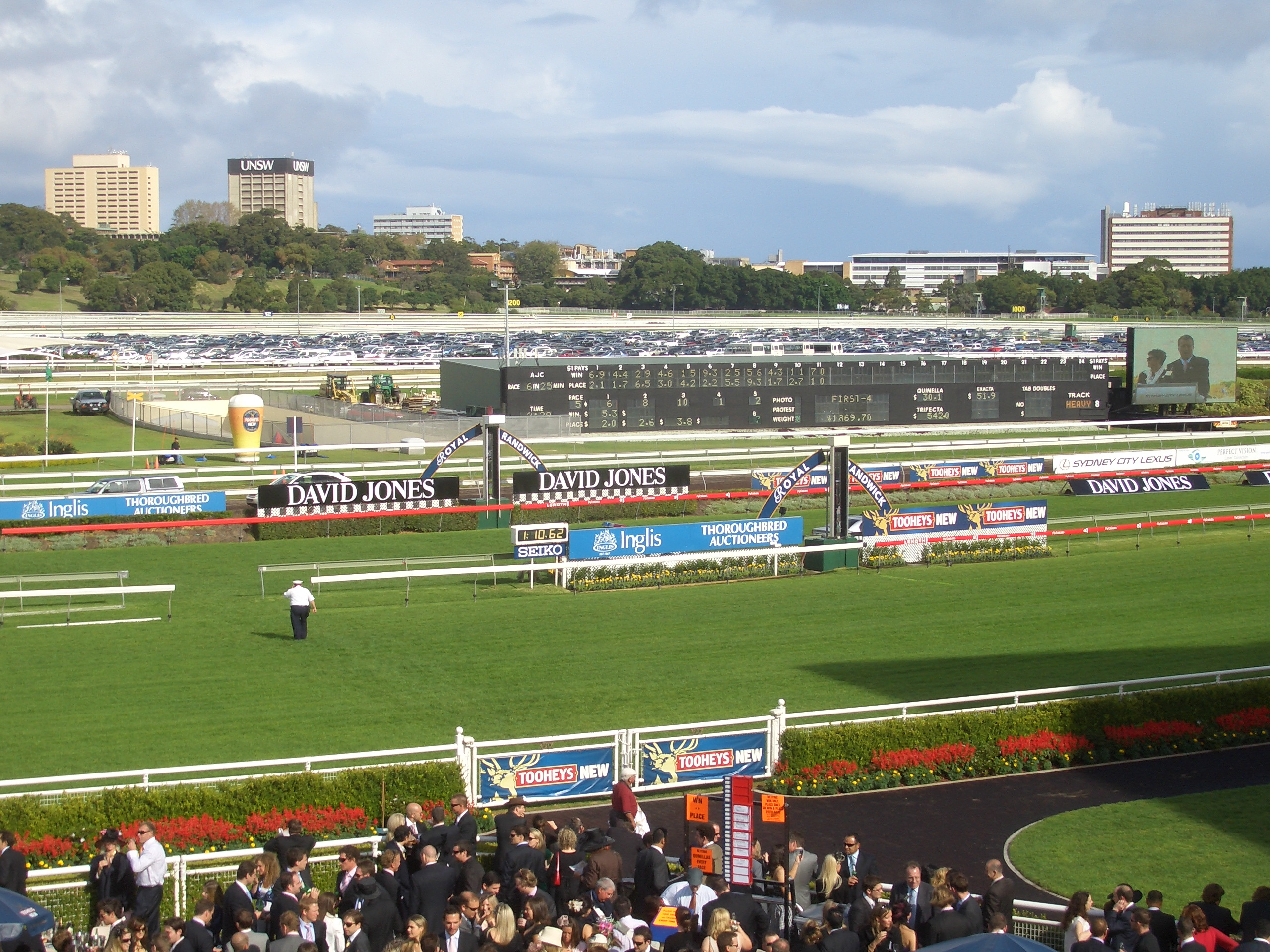
Randwick Racecourse on Derby Day 2007

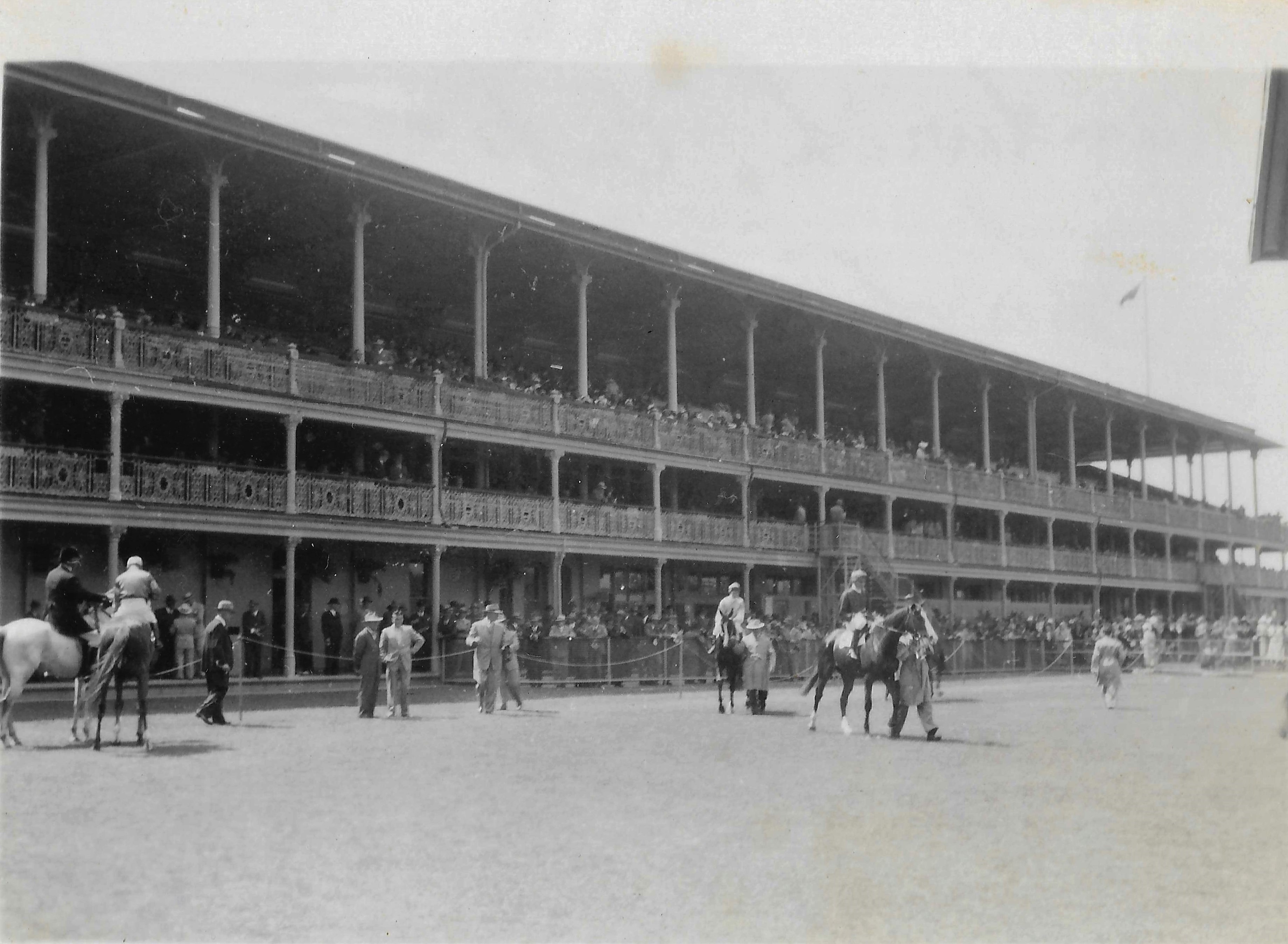
Members stand and enclosure in 1952.

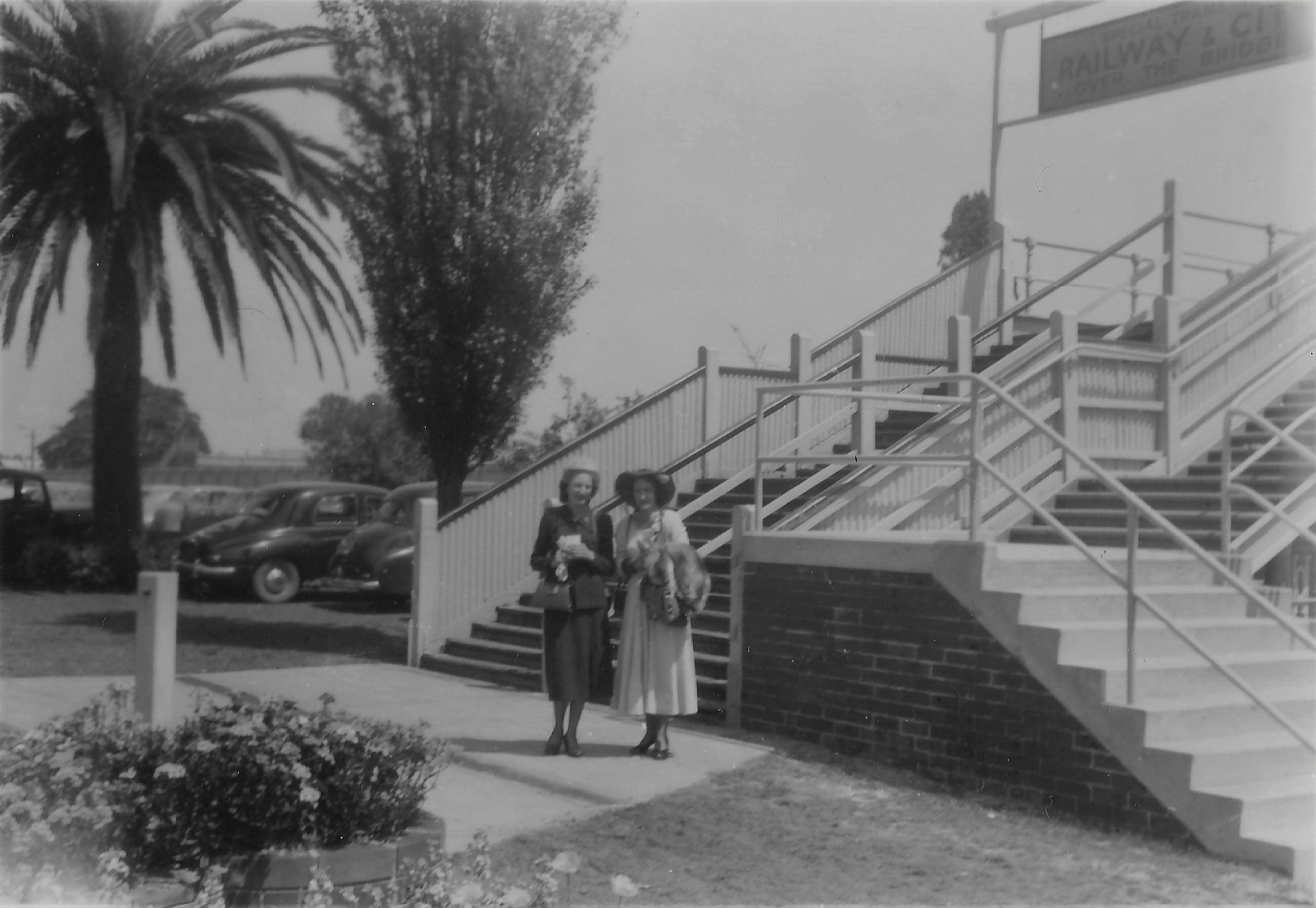
The racecourse tramway exit bridge in 1952.

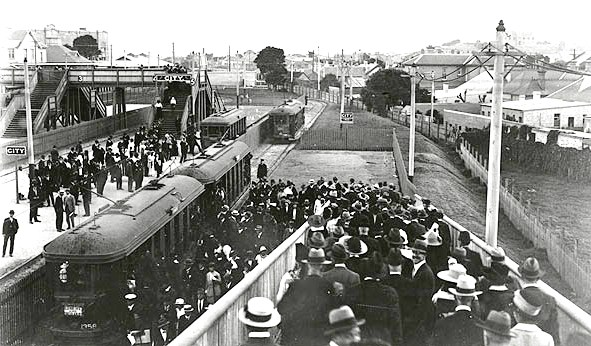
Former 1920 racecourse tram station and southern exit at Ascot Street.

Royal Randwick Racecourse is a racecourse for horse racing located in the Eastern Suburbs of Sydney, New South Wales. Randwick Racecourse is Crown Land leased to the Australian Turf Club and known to many Sydney racegoers as headquarters. The racecourse is located about six kilometres south-east from the Sydney Central Business District in the suburb of Randwick. The course proper has a circumference of 2224m with a home straight of 410m.

On 14 October 2017, the inaugural running of The Everest was held at Royal Randwick. The Everest is the richest race in Australia and the richest turf race in the world with $15 million in prize money.

Since 2014, Randwick hosts The Championships, a two-day season-ending meeting in April that offers over AUD$20 million in prize money. It features several Group 1 races such as the Australian Derby, Doncaster Handicap and Queen Elizabeth Stakes.

Other annual events include the Sydney Carnival, Spring Carnival and the Chinese Festival of Racing.

== History ==
In January 1833, NSW Governor Richard Bourke designated the land for use as a racecourse. Up until then, Hyde Park in the Sydney CBD had been the main venue for racing within the city. The first race held at Randwick was a private event held in June 1833. The course was originally known as the 'Sandy Course' due to the condition of the ground. In 1840 racing ceased at the venue and was only used for training.

In the early 1840s, the Australian Jockey Club (AJC) was formed and in 1860 moved its headquarters to Randwick. In May of that year, racing resumed at the venue with a crowd of 6,000 people attending.

In 1863 the land was officially granted to the AJC and was held until 2011 when the AJC and the Sydney Turf Club (STC) merged to become the Australian Turf Club (ATC). The ATC are the current operators of Royal Randwick Racecourse.

=== 'Royal' Randwick ===
On 22 February 1992, Queen Elizabeth II visited Randwick Racecourse and opened the Paddock Stand. On this date, upon request, the Queen granted permission for the venue to be known as Royal Randwick. From this date the venue was officially able to be referred to as 'Royal Randwick'. An extract from a letter from Kenneth Scott, Deputy Private Secretary to Queen Elizabeth II, to the club reads: "You do not need me to tell you how much The Queen and The Duke of Edinburgh enjoyed their visit to the Royal Randwick Racecourse today. Her Majesty was particularly glad that she was able, on this occasion, to legitimise your traditional title of "Royal" and to open a very handsome new Grandstand."

== Races ==
The following is a list of Group races which are contested at Randwick Racecourse.

Grp	Race Name	Age	Sex	Weight	Distance	Date
1	Australian Derby	3YO	Open	sw	2400	April
1	Queen Elizabeth Stakes	Open	Open	wfa	2000	April
1	Sydney Cup	Open	Open	hcp	3200	April
1	All Aged Stakes	Open	Open	wfa	1400	April
1	Canterbury Stakes	3YO+	Open	wfa	1300	March
1	Doncaster Handicap	Open	Open	hcp	1600	April
1	Champagne Stakes	2YO	Open	sw	1600	April
1	Sires' Produce Stakes	2YO	Open	sw	1400	April
1	Australian Oaks	3YO	Fillies	sw	2400	April
1	Winx Stakes	3YO+	Open	wfa	1400	August
1	The Everest	Open	Open	wfa	1200	October
1	King Charles III Stakes	Open	Open	wfa	1600	October
1	Epsom Handicap	Open	Open	hcp	1600	October
1	Flight Stakes	3YO	Fillies	sw	1600	October
1	Queen of the Turf Stakes	3YO+	F&M	qlty	1600	April
1	Surround Stakes	3YO	Fillies	sw	1400	March
1	Randwick Guineas	3YO	Open	sw	1600	March
1	Spring Champion Stakes	3YO	Open	sw	2000	October
1	T J Smith Stakes	Open	Open	wfa	1200	April
1	Verry Elleegant Stakes	Open	Open	wfa	1600	February
2	Apollo Stakes	3YO+	Open	wfa	1400	February
2	Chairman's Handicap	Open	Open	hcp	2600	April
2	Breeders' Classic	4YO+	Mares	sw+p	1200	February
2	Challenge Stakes	3YO+	Open	wfa	1000	March
2	Chelmsford Stakes	Open	Open	wfa	1600	September
2	Emancipation Stakes	3YO+	F&M	sw+p	1600	April
2	Hill Stakes	3YO+	Open	wfa	1900	September
2	Furious Stakes	3YO	Fillies	sw	1400	September
2	Tramway Stakes	Open	Open	hcp	1400	September
2	Light Fingers Stakes	3YO	Fillies	sw+p	1100	February
2	Roman Consul Stakes	3YO	Open	sw	1200	September
2	Royal Sovereign Stakes	3YO	C&G	sw+p	1200	February
2	Skyline Stakes	2YO	C&G	sw	1200	March
2	Sweet Embrace Stakes	2YO	Fillies	sw	1200	March
2	Sapphire Stakes	Open	F&M	sw+p	1200	April
2	Premiere Stakes	3YO+	Open	wfa	1200	September
2	The Shorts	3YO+	Open	sw+p	1100	September
2	The Metropolitan	Open	Open	hcp	2400	October
2	The Ingham	Open	Open	hcp	1600	December
3	Adrian Knox Stakes	3YO	Fillies	qlty	2000	April
3	Premier's Cup (ATC)	Open	Open	qlty	2000	August
3	Bill Ritchie Handicap	Open	Open	hcp	1400	September
3	Colin Stephen Quality Handicap	Open	Open	hcp	2400	September
3	St Leger Stakes	3YO+	Open	sw+p	2600	October
3	Craven Plate	Open	Open	wfa	2000	October
3	Breeders' Plate	2YO	C&G	sw	1000	October
3	Gimcrack Stakes	2YO	Fillies	sw	1000	October
3	Frank Packer Plate	3YO	Open	sw	2000	April
3	Southern Cross Stakes	Open	Open	hcp	1200	February
3	Kindergarten Stakes	2YO	Open	sw	1100	March
3	Liverpool City Cup	3YO+	Open	hcp	1300	March
3	Summer Cup	Open	Open	hcp	2400	December
L	Randwick City Stakes	3YO+	Open	hcp	2000	March

== Venue ==
Besides horseracing, Randwick Racecourse has been used as a venue for many other events including concerts and religious masses.

In 1970, Pope Paul VI celebrated mass at Randwick as part of his pastoral visit to Australia. The Racecourse was also the site of a mass held by Pope John Paul II in 1995 for the Beatification ceremony of Australia's first potential saint Mary MacKillop. It was also the site of the vigil and final mass of World Youth Day 2008 in July 2008. Racing was stopped for several weeks, due to the alterations needed to hold over 400,000 people. This move had been opposed by the Randwick Trainers Association, which holds lease interests over some areas intended to be used for the event. The dispute was resolved, by the federal government and the state government jointly pledging $40 million as reimbursement to the racing industry. The famous racecourse has also appeared in several films, including Mission: Impossible 2.

Randwick Racecourse is also used as an exam venue by the University of New South Wales.

In addition, the annual Future Music Festival was held at the racecourse from 2006 until it was cancelled in 2015.

=== Buildings and spaces ===
==== Queen Elizabeth II Grandstand: 2013–present ====
The Queen Elizabeth II (QEII) Grandstand is the main grandstand building. Originally constructed in 1969, it was torn down to its bare structure and rebuilt into the current state in 2012 and reopened to the public in 2013. It is 110m in length and 6 storeys high.

==== Official / Members Stand: 1886–present ====
The Official / Members Stand was constructed in 1886 and still remains today although it has been extended and modified multiple times, in 1907, 1914 and 1920.

==== Theatre of the Horse (ToTH): 2013–present ====
The Theatre of the Horse, also known as the "ToTH", is an outdoor auditorium for the presentation of thoroughbred racehorses both before and after a race. The ToTH is linked to the track-front via a tunnel in which the horses access the track. The ToTH has a capacity of 4,500 and is also used for live music events and functions. The construction of the ToTH was not without controversy, many racegoers have criticised the space for not being located trackside.

==== Saddling Paddock Tote Building: 1917–present ====
The Saddling Paddock Tote Building, known as the Octagonal bar, is located behind the main grandstand. It was initially constructed in 1917 to house a totalisator, the fourth in the world to be installed. The building is now used as an event space and a bar on race days.

==== Owners Pavilion: 2013–present ====
The Owners Pavilion is located directly adjacent to the Theatre of the Horse and is a private space for racehorse owners. The pavilion was constructed at the same time as the new QEII Grandstand and ToTH.

==== Paddock Stand: 1992–2012 ====
The Paddock Stand replaced the St Leger Stand and Grandstand and was a two-storey, long, horizontal structure. The stand was formally opened by Queen Elizabeth II in February 1992, it was also on this occasion that the Queen certified Randwick as "Royal". The Paddock Stand was demolished in 2012 to make way for the new QEII Grandstand.

==== Tea House: 1914–2012 ====
The Tea House was a large structure at 50m long, 27m wide and two storeys high and could accommodate 1,000 racegoers. The original Tea house burnt down in 1917 and was immediately reconstructed to the same specifications. The Tea House was demolished in 2012 as part of the upgrades to the current layout.

==== Ladies Stand: 1910–1998 ====
The Ladies Stand, also known as the Queens or Royal Stand, was constructed in 1910 and remained until 1998.

==== First Grandstand: 1860–1875 ====
The First Grandstand was constructed for the first race meeting at Randwick and was made of American timber. Designed by architect John Frederick Hilly, it was intended to be temporary but stood for 15 years.

==== Second Grandstand: 1876–1988 ====
The Second Grandstand, also known as the Paddock Stand, was constructed to replace the initial grandstand constructed on site. It was extended in 1907 and 1914 and remained for more than 100 years to 1988 when it was demolished to make way for the new Paddock Stand.

== See also ==
- List of Australian organisations with royal patronage
- Big Stable Newmarket
