= Australian Turf Club =

Australian horse racing organisation

- Industry: Thoroughbred racing and events
- Founded: 2011
- Headquarters: Sydney, Australia
- Number of employees: 270
- Website: australianturfclub.com.au

The Australian Turf Club (ATC) owns and operates thoroughbred racing, events and hospitality venues across Sydney, Australia. The ATC came into being on 7 February 2011 when the Australian Jockey Club (AJC) and the Sydney Turf Club (STC) merged. The ATC primarily operates out of their offices at Randwick Racecourse and employs approximately 270 full-time staff and over 1,000 casual staff across the five venues. The venues include Randwick, Rosehill Gardens, Canterbury Park, Warwick Farm and the Rosehill Bowling Club.

== History ==
=== Australian Jockey Club ===
The Australian Jockey Club (AJC) was founded in January 1842. It morphed from the former Australian Racing Committee set up in May 1840 to set the standards for racing in the colony. Races were held at the newly established Homebush Course which was headquarters of NSW racing until 1860. The AJC was considered the senior racing club in Australia and was responsible for founding the Australian Stud Book, which the combined club still oversees today. The club also, in conjunction with the Victoria Racing Club, formulated the Rules of Racing that are followed by all Australian race clubs.

=== Sydney Turf Club ===
The Sydney Turf Club (STC) was founded in 1943 and was the youngest of Australia's principal race clubs. It was formed following legislation passed by the New South Wales parliament called the Sydney Turf Club Act. The act had taken 40 years to draft and gave the club the power to hold 62 race meetings a year at the tracks and empowered it to wind up other proprietary clubs that still existed in the Sydney area through a special Racing Compensation Fund.

=== Merger ===
Both the AJC and the STC had co-existed as independent bodies since the early 1940s. However, the first push for a merger came at the start of the millennium, with STC chairman Graeme Pash opening up the possibility of a merger during his tenure. Mentioned briefly in jest by Sydney Morning Herald journalist Craig Young in 2003, the first real push for a merger came with the release of a report by Ernst & Young in June 2009 which recommended that a merger would save the New South Wales racing industry from collapse. The Government of New South Wales pledged $174 million for Sydney racing if the merger went ahead, including a major revitalisation of Randwick Racecourse. The move for a merger was controversial, with members of both clubs hesitant to lose their respective identities. While AJC members voted in favour of a merger due to financial issues, STC members voted against a merger as they were financially stable. Nevertheless, the board of the STC decided to proceed with a merger. The Australian Jockey and Sydney Turf Clubs Merger Act 2010 merged the two clubs under the name of the Australian Turf Club.

=== Rosehill Gardens closure proposal ===
In December 2023, it was announced that the Australian Turf Club and Government of New South Wales were in negotiations to close Rosehill Gardens by the end of the 2020s with the site to be redeveloped for around 25,000 new homes with a new Sydney Metro West station. Funds would be spent on rebuilding Warwick Farm and Royal Randwick, as well as building a new horse training facility built at Horsley Park. The proposal was rejected in May 2025 by a membership vote of 56.1% against compared to 43.9% in favour.

== Venues ==
Five venues are operated by the ATC:

- Royal Randwick Racecourse
- Rosehill Gardens Racecourse
- Canterbury Park Racecourse
- Warwick Farm Racecourse
- Rosehill Bowling Club

== Major races ==
- The Everest
- Golden Slipper Stakes
- Rosehill Guineas
- Canterbury Guineas
- Sydney Cup
- Australian Derby
- Epsom Handicap
- Doncaster Handicap
- The Galaxy
- All Aged Stakes
- Chipping Norton Stakes
- Queen Elizabeth Stakes
- Golden Eagle

== ATC Autumn Carnival and Everest Carnival ==
ATC's Sydney Autumn Racing Carnival includes the Golden Slipper Carnival at Rosehill Gardens consisting of Ladies Day, Golden Slipper Day and Stakes Day, followed by three racedays at Royal Randwick: The Championships Day 1 (Derby Day), The Championships Day 2 (Queen Elizabeth Stakes Day) and All Aged Stakes Day.

The Everest Carnival in spring features the world's richest race on turf — the $15 million The Everest, run in October over 1200 metre at Royal Randwick. It also features the new "Golden Slam", which gives horses the opportunity to win the Golden Slipper Stakes at age 2, the Golden Rose at age 3 and the Golden Eagle at age 4, with an added $5 million in prizemoney for the trio.

In 2008 the Autumn Carnival was delayed by four weeks due to the 2007 Australian equine influenza outbreak.

== See also ==
- Queen's Cup (horse race) (formerly King's Cup), a national race, run at Randwick every sixth year on rotation, from 1928–?
