= Hugh Bowman =

Australian jockey (born 1980)

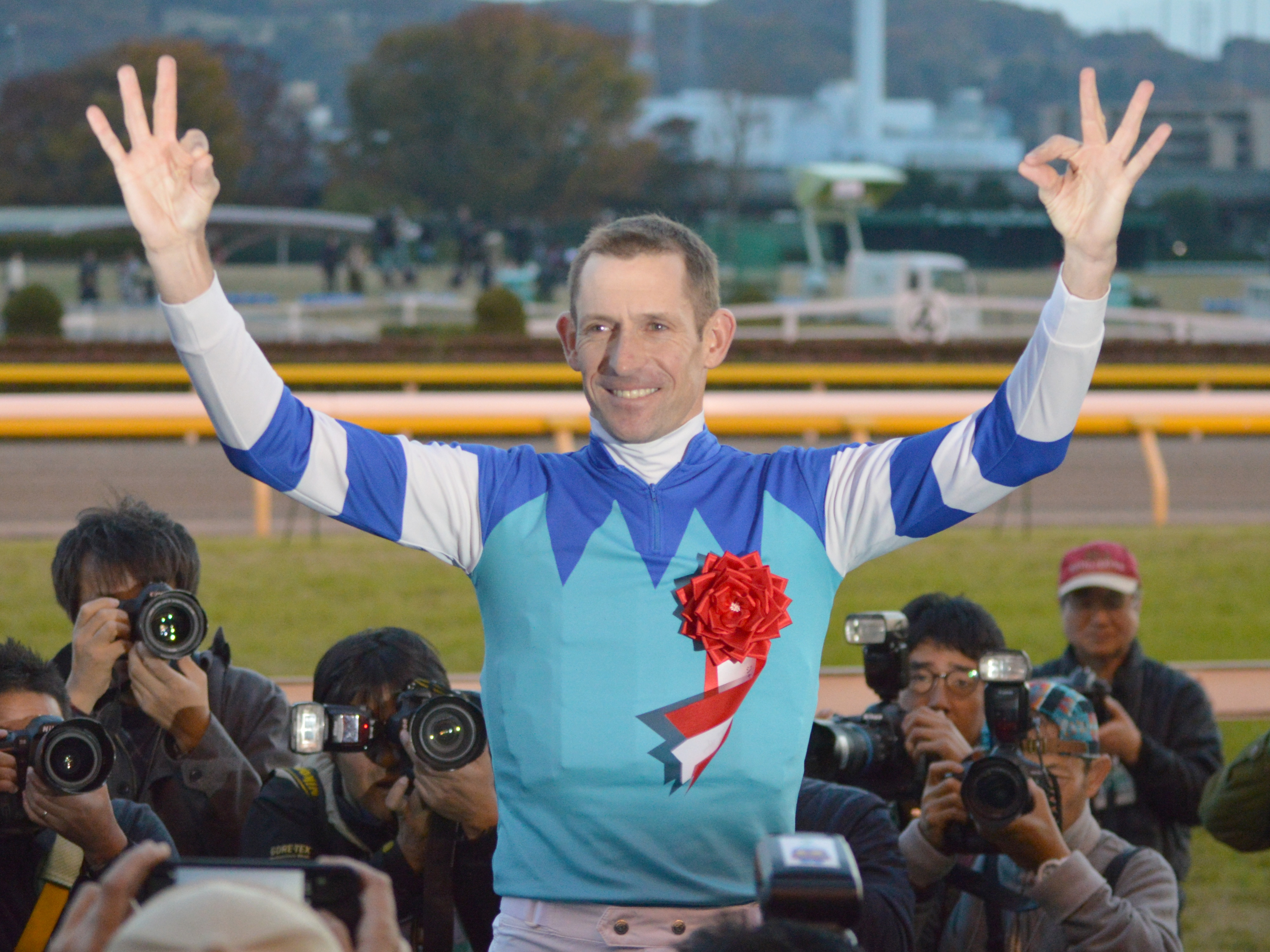
- Bowman's trademark "She's Apples" celebration after winning the 2017 Japan Cup aboard Cheval Grand

Personal information
- Born: 14 July 1980 (age 46) Dunedoo, New South Wales, Australia
- Occupation: Jockey

Horse racing career
- Sport: Horse racing

Major racing wins
- Doomben Cup (2004); Cox Plate (2015, 2016, 2017, 2018); Queensland Oaks (2005, 2015); Epsom Handicap (2015, 2018); Chipping Norton Stakes (2011, 2012, 2013, 2016, 2017, 2018, 2019); Doncaster Mile (2016); George Ryder Stakes (2005, 2010, 2016, 2017, 2018, 2019); George Main Stakes (2012, 2016, 2017, 2018); Australian Oaks (ATC) (2009, 2012, 2016, 2017, 2018); Hong Kong Derby (2016, 2019, 2026); Queen Elizabeth II Cup (2016); Turnbull Stakes (2015, 2017, 2018); Queen Elizabeth Stakes (2013, 2017, 2018, 2019); H E Tancred Stakes (The BMW) (2013, 2016, 2017); Hong Kong Gold Cup (2017); Japan Cup (2017); Hong Kong Champions & Chater Cup (2017, 2023); Winx Stakes (Warwick Stakes) (2016, 2017, 2018); Champagne Stakes (ATC) (2008, 2015, 2020); Sires' Produce Stakes (ATC) (2015, 2017, 2019, 2020); Golden Slipper (2020)

Racing awards
- Longines World's Best Jockey (2017); NSW Metropolitan Jockey Premiership (2008/09, 2011/12, 2014/15, 2016/17); Alistair Haggis Silver Saddle (2007)

Honours
- Australian Racing Hall of Fame (2019)

Significant horses
- Winx, Cheval Grand, Werther, Samantha Miss, Exceed and Excel
- Updated on 9 April 2019

James Hugh Bowman (born 14 July 1980) is an Australian thoroughbred racing jockey. Based in Sydney, Bowman has won the New South Wales Metropolitan Jockey Premiership four times (2008/09, 2011/12, 2014/15, 2016/17) and has ridden 100 Group 1 winners. He was the jockey for Australian champion mare Winx from 2014 through to her retirement in 2019. In 2017, Bowman won the Longines World's Best Jockey award presented by the International Federation of Horseracing Authorities. The award capped off a year in which he added to his domestic success with international Group 1 wins in Hong Kong and Japan. In 2019, he was inducted into the Australian Racing Hall of Fame, the industry's highest accolade. Bowman is also renowned for his “She’s Apples” winning salute and his nickname of “the Undisputed Group 1 King”.

== Early life ==
James Hugh Bowman was born on 14 July 1980 in Dunedoo, NSW. His family spent time on three different properties when he was a child – Cairn Hill, Burrgoen, before his parents decided to return to the family farm, Merotherie, in 1993. The same year, Bowman left to commence his secondary schooling, boarding at The Scots College in Sydney's Eastern Suburbs. Growing up on cattle and sheep properties, Bowman has stated that horses were always an integral part of the working farm and a connection with them was formed early in his life. Bowman also comes from a lineage of horsemen. His grandfather, great uncle, father and uncle all rode as amateur jockeys. Bowman himself was a member of the local pony club until he was 15, riding in country shows and displaying natural horsemanship. He also grew up playing polocrosse, campdrafting and riding in picnic races. Bowman recalls being 13 when he decided that he wanted to pursue a career as a professional jockey. In 1997, he left school and secured an apprenticeship with trainer Leanne Aspros in Bathurst, where he was also mentored by her husband, Billy Aspros, who was 12-time champion jockey in the NSW Central Districts and a Group 1 winner (Turridu, 1995 George Main Stakes).

== Career ==
On 3 April 1996, Bowman had his first official ride as an amateur jockey at the Mungery Picnic Races in Narromine, NSW aboard Go Campese. Later that year on October 5, he rode his first winner at Wellington, NSW when he guided Slatts to win the Wellington Picnic Cup. By the end of his first apprentice season in 1998, Bowman was the champion apprentice jockey in the NSW Central Districts. In 1999, Bowman moved to Sydney for the final two years of his apprenticeship under the tutelage of jockey-turned-trainer Ron Quinton, who also hailed from Dunedoo. He was crowned champion apprentice in Sydney for the 1999/2000 season. In the spring of 2001, Bowman won his maiden group race when he rode Sportsbrat to victory in the Group 3 Missile Stakes at Rosehill Gardens. His first Group 1 win came on Defier in the 2004 Doomben Cup in Brisbane. The following year, Bowman finished runner-up to Darren Beadman in the 2004/05 NSW Metropolitan Jockey Premiership (colloquially known as the Sydney Jockeys Premiership), the highest award for NSW-based jockeys. He then claimed his first premiership in the 2008/09 season riding 98 winners from 482 starts at a strike rate of 20.3%. Bowman has since won three more titles in 2011/12, 2014/15 and 2016/17. As his career entered the 2010s, Bowman developed a strong association with trainer Chris Waller. He would go on to ride many feature race victories on Waller's horses, most notably Winx. During his career, Bowman has ridden:

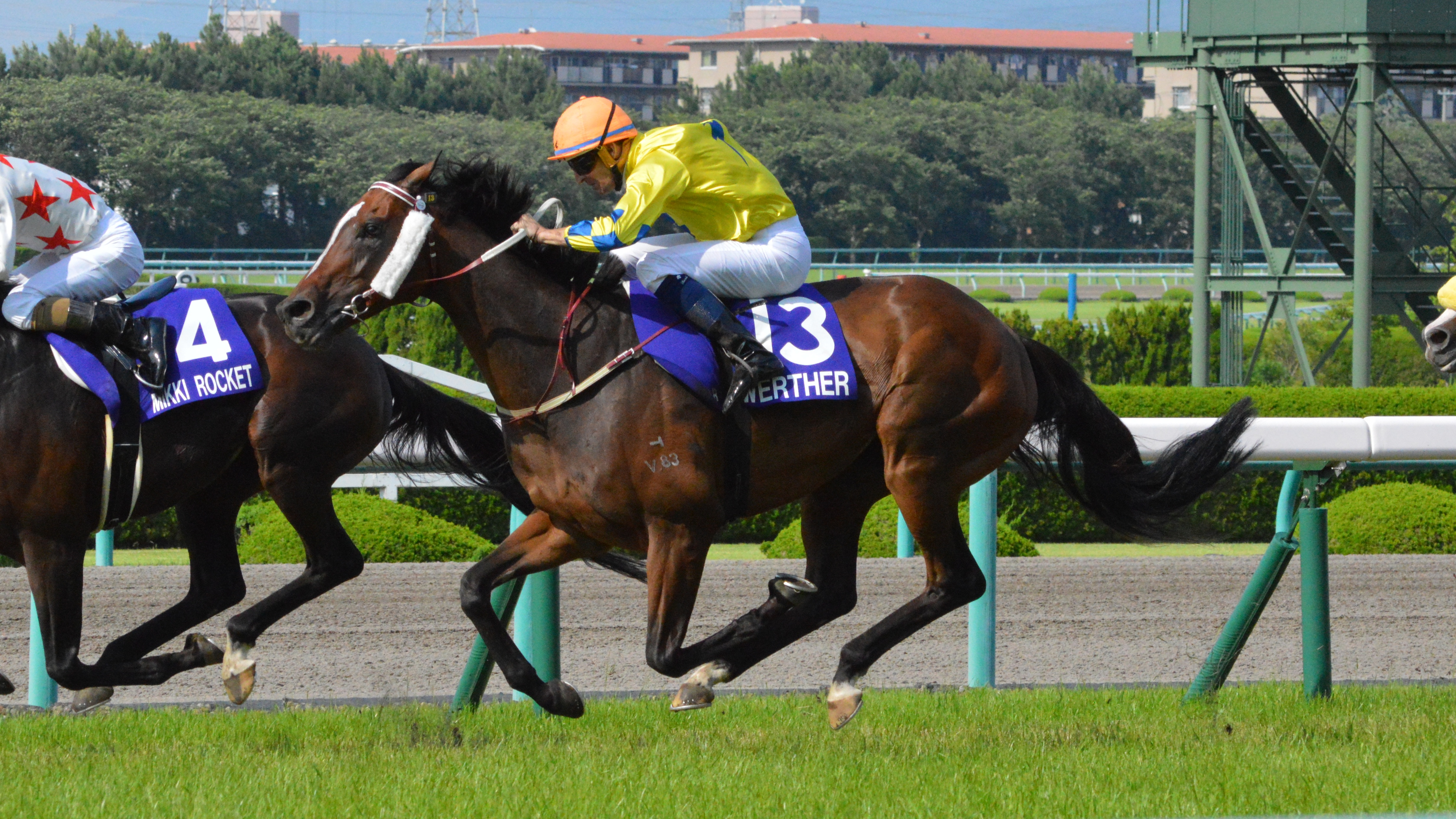
Bowman riding Werther to a second-place finish in the Takarazuka Kinen behind Mikki Rocket at Hanshin Racecourse

- Exceed and Excel: 2003/04 Australian Champion Sprinter
- Samantha Miss: 2008/09 Australian Champion Three-Year-Old Filly
- Werther: 2015/16 Hong Kong Horse of the Year
- Cheval Grand: 2017 Japan Cup Winner
- Winx: 4-time Australian Champion Racehorse of the Year (2015/16 - 2018/19), World's Top-Ranked Turf Horse (2016, 2017), World's Best Racehorse (2018 - tied)

On 5 March 2022, Bowman rode his 100th Group One winner when guiding Forbidden Love to win the Canterbury Stakes at Randwick.

=== Winx ===
==== 2014 ====
Winx had five different jockeys across her first 11 starts in 2014 and 2015, including Bowman. His involvement with Winx began during the Sydney Spring Racing Carnival in 2014. Bowman's first ride on Winx came at her third career start, on 6 September, in the Group 2 Furious Stakes at Royal Randwick. Winx won the race, making it 3 wins from 3 starts, while also registering her first feature race success. Two starts later, on 4 October, Bowman would ride Winx to a second-place finish in the Group 1 Flight Stakes at Royal Randwick behind First Seal.

==== 2015 ====
Bowman did not ride Winx again until her twelfth career start during the Brisbane Winter Racing Carnival – a victory in the Group 1 Queensland Oaks at Doomben Racecourse on 30 May. This was Winx's first Group 1 success and the second triumph in what was to become her 33 consecutive race winning streak. Two starts later, after a 15-week spell and a return win in the Group 2 Theo Marks Stakes at Rosehill Gardens, Bowman was back aboard Winx steering the mare to victory in the Group 1 Epsom Handicap at Royal Randwick on 3 October. From this race on, Bowman became the permanent jockey for Winx. He would have one more ride on the mare in 2015 when he travelled to Moonee Valley, Melbourne to ride her in the $3 million-dollar Group 1 W. S. Cox Plate – the weight-for-age championship of Australia. Starting as the $4.60 favourite, Winx and Bowman went on to win the race by 4&¾ lengths from Criterion and Irish galloper Highland Reel. The race was won in a record time of 2:02.98.

==== 2016 ====
Bowman guided Winx to victory in her return to racing on 13 February in the Group 2 Apollo Stakes at Royal Randwick. He would then pilot Winx to three consecutive Group 1 wins over the course of the Sydney Autumn Racing Carnival – the Chipping Norton Stakes, George Ryder Stakes and the $3 million-dollar Doncaster Mile. After a 20-week spell, Winx returned in the spring on 20 August, with Bowman steering her to victory in the Group 2 Warwick Stakes at Royal Randwick. Then one month later, just as in the autumn, Bowman would ride Winx to three consecutive Group 1 victories over the course of five weeks. Wins in the George Main Stakes and Caulfield Stakes culminated in Winx and Bowman winning their second W. S. Cox Plate in a row. The race was won by a record margin of 8 lengths. Bowman became only the tenth jockey to win the race back-to-back, while Winx became the tenth horse in history to win two successive Cox Plates.

==== 2017 ====
Bowman and Winx started off their 2017 autumn campaign in the exact same fashion as 2016 with a win in the Apollo Stakes at Royal Randwick on 13 February. Wins in the Chipping Norton Stakes at Randwick and George Ryder Stakes at Rosehill followed on 25 February and 18 March respectively. While Winx and Bowman's lead-up had been identical to the autumn of 2016, their end goal had shifted to the $4 million-dollar Group 1 Queen Elizabeth Stakes. The race is the premier weight-for-age race of the Sydney Autumn Carnival and the showpiece event of The Championships – a two-day race meeting comprising the most lucrative races of the carnival, attracting horses from around the globe. Starting as the $1.12 short-priced favourite, Bowman guided Winx to a 5-length victory ahead of Hartnell and Sense of Occasion.

The duo returned in the spring registering three wins in Sydney at Royal Randwick – in the Warwick Stakes, Chelmsford Stakes and George Main Stakes – before heading to Melbourne to attempt to win a third consecutive W. S. Cox Plate. On 7 October Bowman and Winx won the Group 1 Turnbull Stakes in her first career start at Flemington Racecourse. Three weeks later, on 28 October, Bowman piloted Winx to her third W. S. Cox Plate win, breaking her previous race record set in 2015 with 2:02.94. Winx became only the second horse in history to win three straight Cox Plates after Kingston Town did it in 1980, ‘81 and ’82. Likewise, Bowman was also only the second jockey to win three successive Cox Plates after Brent Thomson managed the feat from 1977-79 on three separate thoroughbreds – Family of Man (’77), So Called (’78) and Dulcify (’79).

==== 2018 ====
Winx would only race three times in the Sydney Autumn Carnival of 2018, all at Group 1 level. Bowman would ride her to success in her third consecutive Chipping Norton and George Ryder Stakes before she once again won the Queen Elizabeth Stakes for a second straight year. Winx and Bowman returned in the spring on 18 August when they won the newly named and upgraded Group 1 Winx Stakes – formerly the Group 2 Warwick Stakes, renamed in the mare’s honour. Winx became only the second horse in Australian racing history to win a race named in its honour after Black Caviar won the Black Caviar Lightning Stakes in 2013. Victories followed in the George Main Stakes and Turnbull Stakes, before Bowman and Winx won their fourth consecutive W. S. Cox Plate together on 27 October. The duo were the first respective horse and jockey to win four successive Cox Plates.

==== 2019 ====
Winx and Bowman returned to racing, in what would be the mare’s final campaign, on 16 February with victory in the Apollo Stakes at Royal Randwick. Fourth successive Chipping Norton and George Ryder Stakes wins followed on 2 and 23 March respectively. In their final race together, Bowman and Winx won their third consecutive Queen Elizabeth Stakes. Winx was officially retired after the race. Bowman and Winx’s partnership had produced 29 straight victories and 32 wins and 1 second placing from 33 starts together.

=== Group 1 wins ===
Hugh Bowman's Group 1 Wins
Race	Year	Track	Distance	Horse
Champions Mile	2026	Sha Tin	1600	My Wish
Champions Mile	2025	Sha Tin	1600	Red Lion
Chairman's Sprint Prize	2024	Sha Tin	1200	Invincible Sage
Hong Kong Champions & Chater Cup	2023	Sha Tin	2400	Russian Emperor
The Metropolitan (ATC)	2021	Randwick	2400	Montefilia
Champagne Stakes (ATC)	2020	Randwick	1600	King's Legacy
Sires' Produce Stakes (ATC)	2020	Randwick	1400	King's Legacy
Golden Slipper Stakes	2020	Rosehill	1200	Farnan
The Thousand Guineas	2019	Caulfield	1600	Flit
Golden Rose Stakes	2019	Rosehill	1400	Bivouac
Queen Elizabeth Stakes (ATC)	2019	Randwick	2000	Winx
Sires' Produce Stakes (ATC)	2019	Randwick	1400	Microphone
George Ryder Stakes	2019	Rosehill	1500	Winx
Chipping Norton Stakes	2019	Randwick	1600	Winx
Futurity Stakes (MRC)	2019	Caulfield	1400	Alizee
Cox Plate	2018	Moonee Valley	2040	Winx
Manikato Stakes	2018	Moonee Valley	1200	Brave Smash
Turnbull Stakes	2018	Flemington	2000	Winx
Epsom Handicap	2018	Randwick	1600	Hartnell
George Main Stakes	2018	Randwick	1600	Winx
Winx Stakes	2018	Randwick	1400	Winx
Australian Oaks (ATC)	2018	Randwick	2400	Unforgotten
Queen Elizabeth Stakes (ATC)	2018	Randwick	2000	Winx
George Ryder Stakes	2018	Rosehill	1500	Winx
Rosehill Guineas	2018	Rosehill	2000	D'Argento
Chipping Norton Stakes	2018	Randwick	1600	Winx
Japan Cup	2017	Tokyo	2400	Cheval Grand
Cox Plate	2017	Moonee Valley	2040	Winx
Turnbull Stakes	2017	Flemington	2000	Winx
Underwood Stakes	2017	Caulfield	1800	Bonneval
George Main Stakes	2017	Randwick	1600	Winx
Queensland Derby	2017	Doomben	2200	Ruthven
Hong Kong Champions & Chater Cup	2017	Sha Tin	2400	Werther
Kingsford-Smith Cup	2017	Eagle Farm	1300	Clearly Innocent
Chairman's Sprint Prize	2017	Sha Tin	1200	Lucky Bubbles
Australian Oaks	2017	Randwick	2400	Bonneval
Queen Elizabeth Stakes (ATC)	2017	Randwick	2000	Winx
Sires' Produce Stakes (ATC)	2017	Randwick	1400	Invader
H E Tancred Stakes	2017	Rosehill	2400	Jameka
George Ryder Stakes	2017	Rosehill	1500	Winx
Hong Kong Gold Cup	2017	Sha Tin	2000	Werther
Chipping Norton Stakes	2017	Randwick	1600	Winx
Coolmore Stud Stakes	2016	Flemington	1200	Flying Artie
Cantala Stakes	2016	Flemington	1600	Le Romain
Cox Plate	2016	Moonee Valley	2040	Winx
Caulfield Stakes	2016	Caulfield	2000	Winx
George Main Stakes	2016	Randwick	1600	Winx
Queen Elizabeth II Cup	2016	Sha Tin	2000	Werther
Australian Oaks	2016	Randwick	2400	Sofia Rosa
Doncaster Handicap	2016	Randwick	1600	Winx
H E Tancred Stakes	2016	Rosehill	2400	Preferment
George Ryder Stakes	2016	Rosehill	1500	Winx
Australian Cup	2016	Flemington	2000	Preferment
Chipping Norton Stakes	2016	Randwick	1600	Winx
Cox Plate	2015	Moonee Valley	2040	Winx
Caulfield Guineas	2015	Caulfield	1600	Press Statement
Turnbull Stakes	2015	Flemington	2000	Preferment
Epsom Handicap	2015	Randwick	1600	Winx
Queensland Oaks	2015	Doomben	2200	Winx
Robert Sangster Stakes	2015	Morphettville	1200	Miracles Of Life
Champagne Stakes (ATC)	2015	Randwick	1600	Pasadena Girl
Sires' Produce Stakes (ATC)	2015	Randwick	1400	Pride of Dubai
Randwick Guineas	2015	Randwick	1600	Hallowed Crown
VRC Sprint Classic	2014	Flemington	1200	Terravista
VRC Oaks	2014	Flemington	2500	Set Square
The Thousand Guineas	2014	Caulfield	1600	Amicus
Golden Rose Stakes	2014	Rosehill	1400	Hallowed Crown
Australian Derby	2014	Randwick	2400	Criterion
Vinery Stud Stakes	2014	Rosehill	2000	Lucia Valentina
Rosehill Guineas	2014	Rosehill	2000	Criterion
Victoria Derby	2013	Flemington	2500	Polanski
The Metropolitan (ATC)	2013	Randwick	2400	Seville
Queen Elizabeth Stakes (ATC)	2013	Randwick	2000	Reliable Man
Sydney Cup	2013	Randwick	3200	Mourayan
Vinery Stud Stakes	2013	Rosehill	2000	Norzita
H E Tancred Stakes	2013	Rosehill	2400	Fiveandahalfstar
Chipping Norton Stakes	2013	Warwick Farm	1600	Shoot Out
Flight Stakes	2012	Randwick	1600	Norzita
George Main Stakes	2012	Randwick	1600	Shoot Out
Australian Oaks	2012	Randwick	2400	Streama
Chipping Norton Stakes	2012	Warwick Farm	1600	Shoot Out
Victoria Derby	2011	Flemington	2500	Sangster
Flight Stakes	2011	Randwick	1600	Streama
Chipping Norton Stakes	2011	Warwick Farm	1600	Danleigh
Emirates Stakes	2010	Flemington	1600	Wall Street
Victoria Derby	2010	Flemington	2500	Lion Tamer
Spring Champion Stakes	2010	Randwick	2000	Erewhon
George Ryder Stakes	2010	Rosehill	1500	Danleigh
Australian Oaks	2009	Randwick	2400	Daffodil
VRC Oaks	2008	Flemington	2500	Samantha Miss
Flight Stakes	2008	Randwick	1600	Samantha Miss
Champagne Stakes (ATC)	2008	Randwick	1600	Samantha Miss
All Aged Stakes	2008	Randwick	1400	Racing To Win
Rosehill Guineas	2007	Rosehill	2000	He's No Pie Eater
Ranvet Stakes	2007	Rosehill	2000	Desert War
Flight Stakes	2006	Randwick	1600	Cheeky Choice
TJ Smith Stakes	2006	Randwick	1200	Red Oog
Queensland Oaks	2005	Eagle Farm	2400	Vitesse Dane
Doomben 10,000	2005	Doomben	1350	Red Oog
George Ryder Stakes	2005	Rosehill	1500	Court's In Session
Doomben Cup	2004	Doomben	2200	Defier

=== International Success ===
Bowman's first international feature race success came in July 2007 when he won the Group 2 Superlative Stakes aboard Hatta Fort at Newmarket Racecourse in Newmarket, England. Bowman was in England as part of a three-month riding stint with trainer Mick Channon who was based at West Ilsley in Berkshire. In August, Bowman, as part of the “Rest of the World” team, won the Shergar Cup at Ascot Racecourse – a four-team competition where three jockeys represent their region with the winning team determined by their overall performance across six races. The four teams represented were Great Britain, Ireland, Europe and Rest of the World. In addition to winning the Shergar Cup, Bowman also received the Alistair Haggis Silver Saddle, the award given to the individual jockey who has accrued the most points in the competition.

Bowman's most successful year of international racing came in 2017. After securing his first two international Group 1 wins in 2016 aboard Werther in both the Hong Kong Derby (HK) and Queen Elizabeth II Cup (HK), Bowman would go on to win another four Group 1's in 2017. Two of these victories were again on Werther in the Hong Kong Gold Cup (HK) and the Hong Kong Champions & Chater Cup (HK). Bowman won another Group 1 in Hong Kong when he rode Lucky Bubbles to success in the Chairman's Sprint Prize (HK). His fourth win of the year came when he guided Cheval Grand to win the US$5.8 million-dollar Japan Cup (JP), the country's most prominent race. As a result, Bowman won the 2017 Longines World's Best Jockey award presented by the International Federation of Horseracing Authorities (IFHA) – the highest achievement for professional jockeys globally. The scoring for the award is based upon performances in the 100-highest rated Group 1 races internationally for that year, as established by the Longines World's Best Racehorse Rankings Committee. Jockey's accrue 12 points for first, 6 points for second and 4 points for third. Bowman's four international Group 1's, combined with Winx's six Australian Group 1's that year, provided 10 wins, along with 3 second placings and 1 third placing, giving him a total of 142 points. Ryan Moore and Frankie Dettori finished second and third with 124 and 86 points respectively. Moore notched 5 wins and Dettori finished with 6.

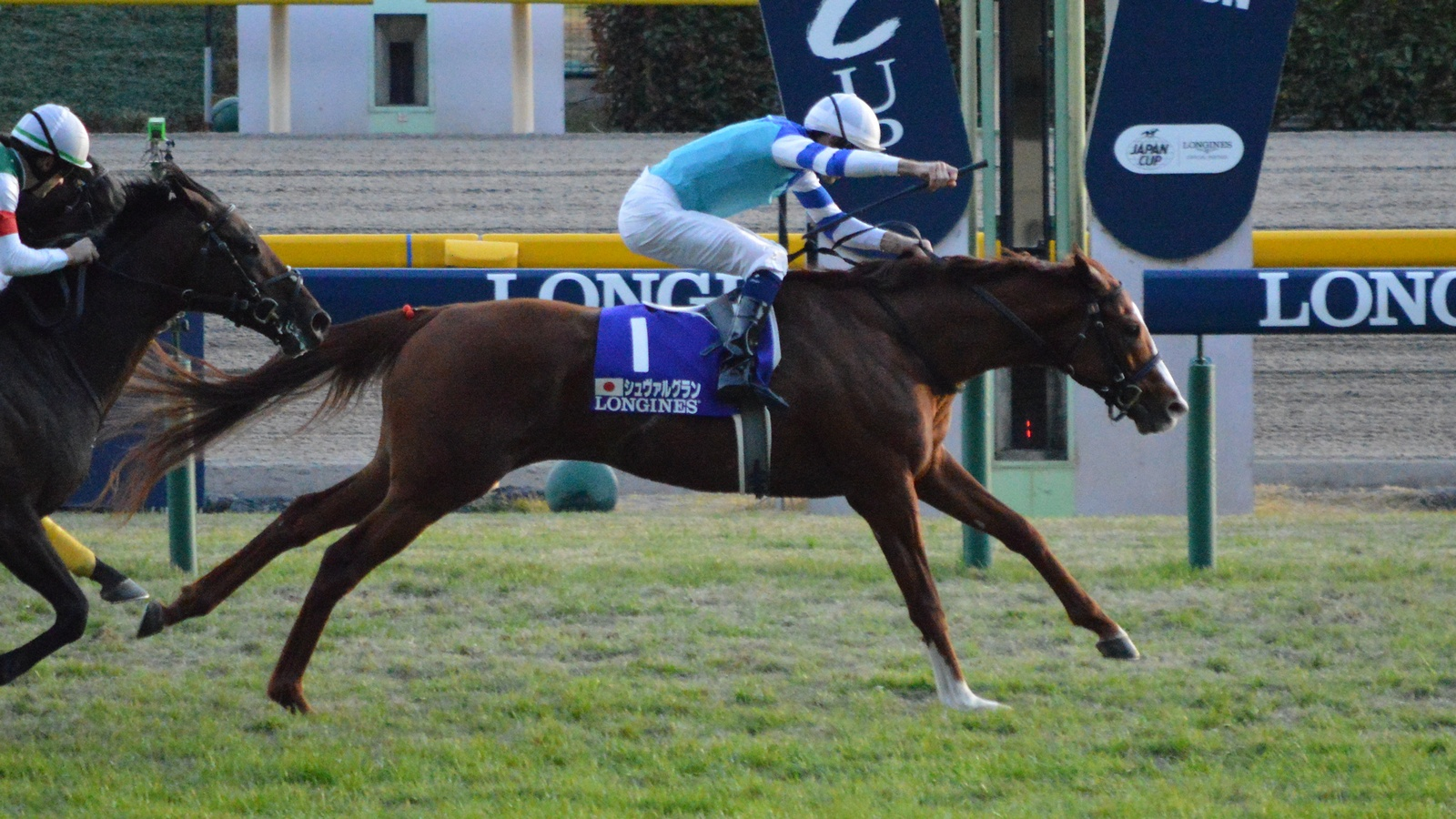
Bowman and Cheval Grand win the 2017 Japan Cup

==== International Group 1 wins ====
- 2016 - Queen Elizabeth II Cup: 2000m, Sha Tin, Hong Kong – Werther
- 2017 - Hong Kong Gold Cup: 2000m, Sha Tin, Hong Kong – Werther
- 2017 - Chairman's Sprint Prize: 1200m, Sha Tin, Hong Kong – Lucky Bubbles
- 2017 - Hong Kong Champions & Chater Cup: 2400m, Sha Tin, Hong Kong – Werther
- 2017 - Japan Cup: 2400m, Tokyo, Japan – Cheval Grand

==== Other notable international wins ====
- 2007 - G2 Superlative Stakes: 1400m, Newmarket, England – Hatta Fort
- 2015 - G2 Hopeful Stakes: 2000m, Nakayama, Japan – Hartley
- 2016 - G2 Jockey Club Sprint: 1200m, Sha Tin, Hong Kong – Not Listenin’tome
- 2017 - G2 Westbury Classic: 1400m, Ellerslie, New Zealand – Thee Auld Floozie

== Personal life ==
Bowman is married to Christine (née Walsh) and they have two daughters. Christine Bowman is an Irish national who met Hugh when she moved to Sydney after spending the Australian spring of 2002 tending to Irish trainer Dermott Weld’s two Melbourne Cup horses – Vinnie Roe and, eventual winner, Media Puzzle. She is a former trackwork rider and on-course producer for TVN's Sydney race meetings. The family currently reside in Coogee in Sydney's Eastern Suburbs.

Bowman is named after his great uncle, James Hugh Bowman. He was a private in the Australian Army (Unit: 1 Company Australian Army Service Corps) in World War II who was killed in action on 12 February 1942 in Malaya.

== Gallery ==
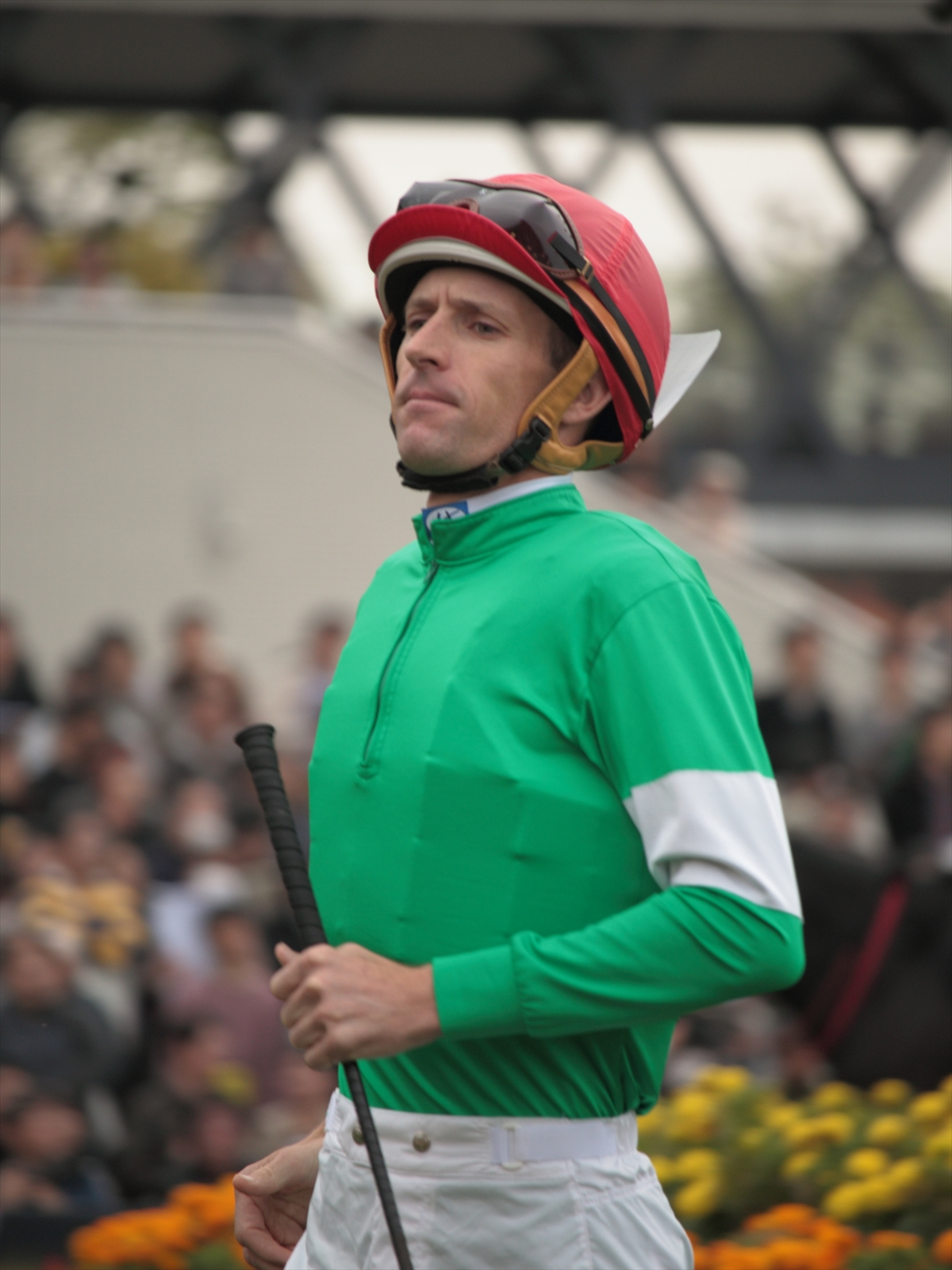
Hugh Bowman in Japan (2015)

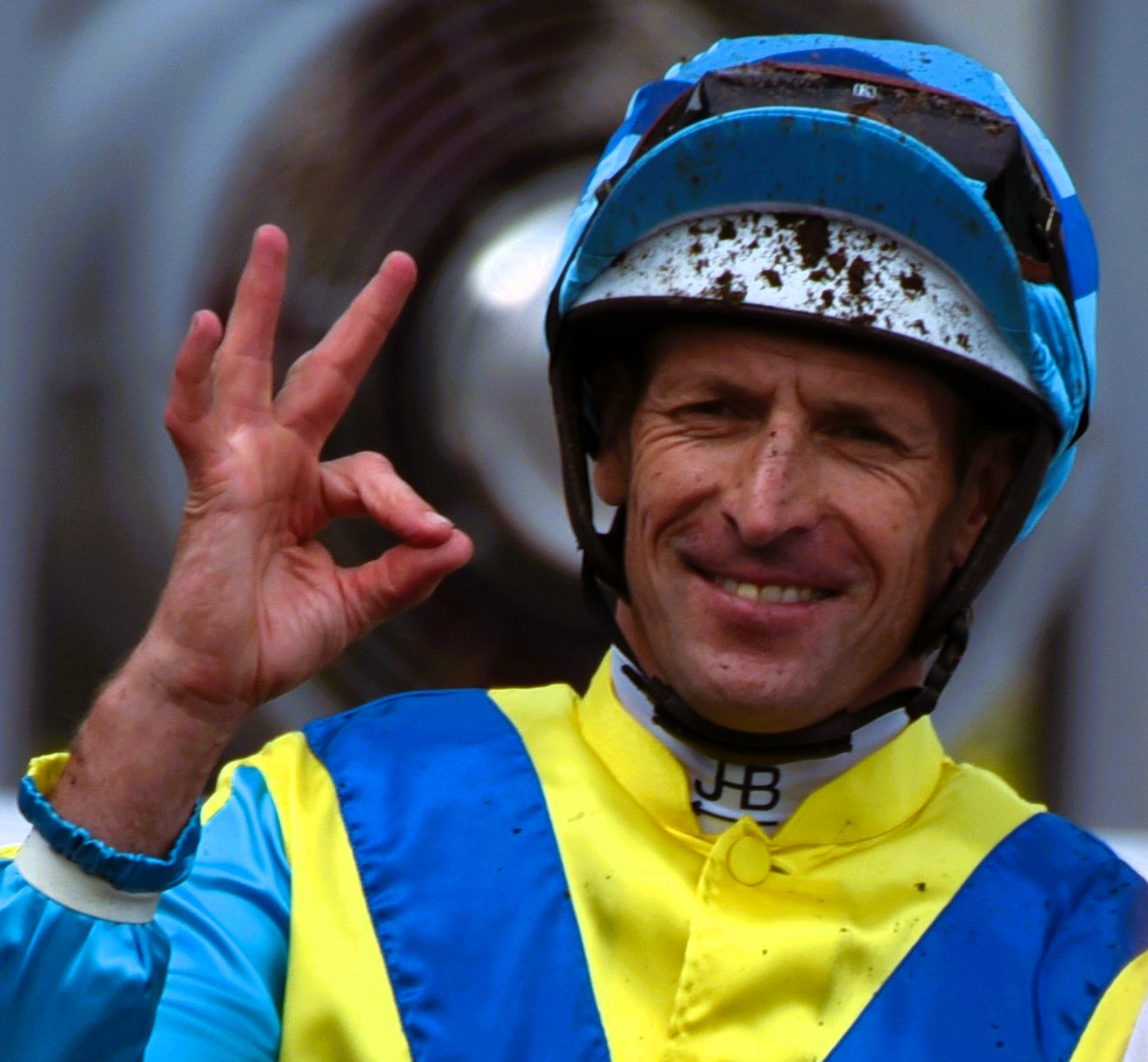
Hugh Bowman in Hong Kong (2023)

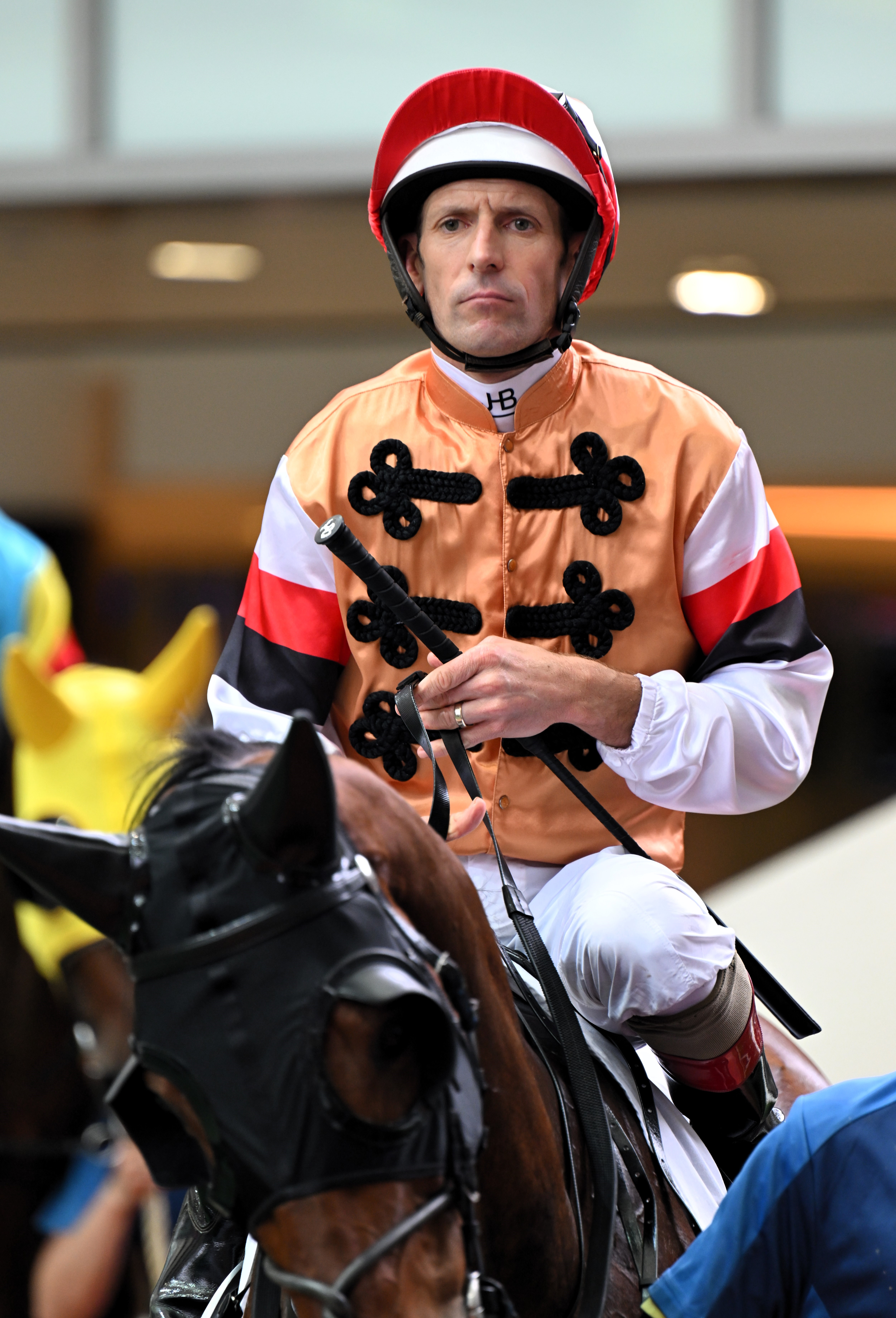
Hugh Bowman in Hong Kong (2024)

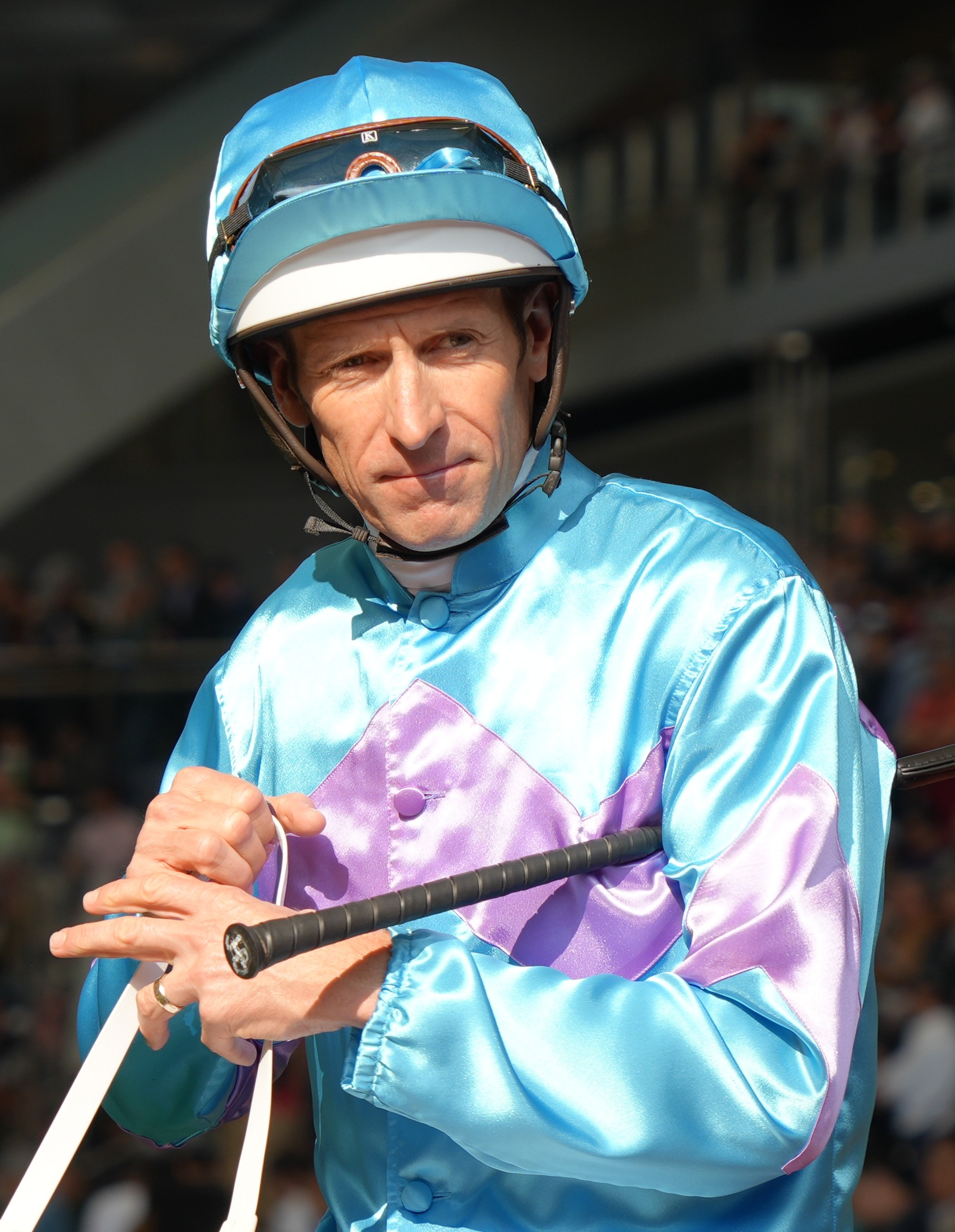
Hugh Bowman in Hong Kong (2025)

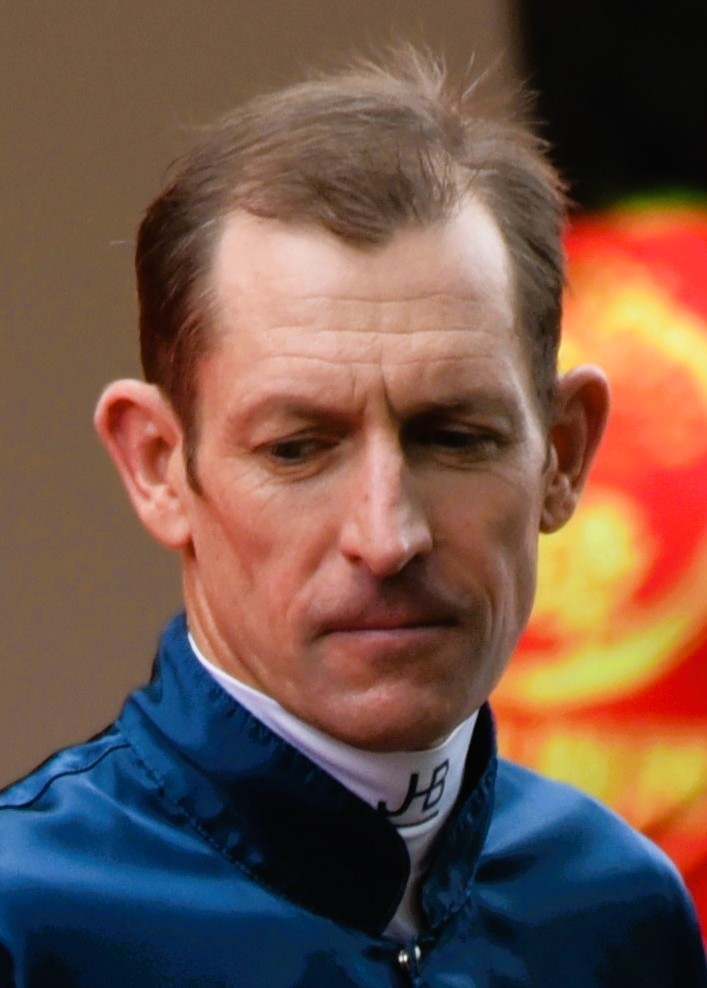
Hugh Bowman in Hong Kong (2026)
