= Flit (horse) =

Australian Thoroughbred racehorse

- Racing silks of Godolphin
- Sire: Medaglia d'Oro
- Grandsire: El Prado
- Dam: Glissade
- Damsire: Redoute's Choice
- Sex: Filly
- Foaled: 4 October 2016
- Country: Australia
- Colour: Bay
- Breeder: Godolphin
- Owner: Godolphin
- Trainer: James Cummings
- Record: 21: 4–4–1
- Earnings: A$ 1,601,490

Major wins
- Thoroughbred Breeders Stakes (2019); The Thousand Guineas (2019); Light Fingers Stakes (2020)

Flit (foaled 4 October 2016) is a Group 1 winning Australian thoroughbred racehorse.

== Background ==
Flit was born and raised at Darley's Northwood Park property in Seymour, Victoria. She is sired by Champion stallion Medaglia d'Oro and is out of a Redoute's Choice mare named Glissade, who was Stakes placed as a 2 year old.

== Racing career ==
=== 2018/19: two-year-old season ===
Flit finished third at her first ever start in an 1100-metre maiden at Bendigo. A month later she was successful in the Group 3 Thoroughbred Breeders Stakes, where she finished a Dead heat winner.

=== 2019/20 three-year-old season ===
After running placings in the Percy Sykes Stakes and the Silver Shadow Stakes, Flit started the 11/8 favourite in the Group 1 Thousand Guineas at Caulfield Racecourse. Ridden by Hugh Bowman she won by the barest possible margin of a nose.

Resuming from a three-month spell, Flit was successful in the Light Fingers Stakes at the odds of 10/1. She defeated fellow Godolphin runners Lyre and Kiamichi to trifecta the race for the stable.

After unplaced runs in the Surround Stakes and All Star Mile, Flit finished second in the Arrowfield 3YO Sprint beaten by a nose margin.

=== 2020/21 four-year-old season ===
Flit returned to racing after a four-month break on 8 August in the Missile Stakes at Rosehill. After looming up in the straight she was beaten 1 1/2 lengths into second place.

Flit would then have two unplaced runs in the Winx Stakes and Sheraco Stakes before contesting the Silver Eagle at Randwick on the 10 October 2020. Flit settled in the back half of the field before finishing with a strong run to pass Alligator Blood and win by half a length.

Flit had her final race prior to becoming a broodmare when finishing unplaced behind Tofane in the 2021 Tattersall's Tiara

== Pedigree ==
Pedigree of Flit (AUS) 2016
Sire Medaglia d'Oro (USA) 1999	El Prado (IRE); 1989	Sadler's Wells	Northern Dancer
Sire Medaglia d'Oro (USA) 1999	El Prado (IRE); 1989	Sadler's Wells	Fairy Bridge
Sire Medaglia d'Oro (USA) 1999	El Prado (IRE); 1989	Lady Capulet	Sir Ivor
Sire Medaglia d'Oro (USA) 1999	El Prado (IRE); 1989	Lady Capulet	Cap and Bells
Sire Medaglia d'Oro (USA) 1999	Cappucino Bay (USA); 1989	Bailjumper	Damascus
Sire Medaglia d'Oro (USA) 1999	Cappucino Bay (USA); 1989	Bailjumper	Court Circuit
Sire Medaglia d'Oro (USA) 1999	Cappucino Bay (USA); 1989	Dubbed In	Silent Screen
Sire Medaglia d'Oro (USA) 1999	Cappucino Bay (USA); 1989	Dubbed In	Society Singer
Dam Glissade (AUS) 2008	Redoute's Choice (AUS); 1996	Danehill	Danzig
Dam Glissade (AUS) 2008	Redoute's Choice (AUS); 1996	Danehill	Razyana
Dam Glissade (AUS) 2008	Redoute's Choice (AUS); 1996	Shantha's Choice	Canny Lad
Dam Glissade (AUS) 2008	Redoute's Choice (AUS); 1996	Shantha's Choice	Dancing Show
Dam Glissade (AUS) 2008	Steflara (AUS); 2000	Zabeel	Sir Tristram
Dam Glissade (AUS) 2008	Steflara (AUS); 2000	Zabeel	Lady Giselle
Dam Glissade (AUS) 2008	Steflara (AUS); 2000	Blue Storm	Bluebird
Dam Glissade (AUS) 2008	Steflara (AUS); 2000	Blue Storm	My Gold Hope
