= Samantha Miss =

Australian-bred Thoroughbred racehorse

- Sire: Redoute's Choice
- Grandsire: Danehill
- Dam: Milliyet (NZ)
- Damsire: Zabeel
- Sex: Mare
- Foaled: 2005
- Country: Australia
- Colour: Bay
- Breeder: G.D. Witters
- Trainer: Kris A Lees
- Record: 12: 7-2-2
- Earnings: A$1,750,760

Major wins
- Champagne Stakes (2008); Silver Shadow Stakes (2008); Furious Stakes (2008); Tea Rose Stakes (2008); Flight Stakes (2008); VRC Oaks (2008)

Honours
- Won all four legs of the Princess Series
- Last updated on 6 November 2009

Samantha Miss was an Australian Thoroughbred racemare that won three Group One races for earnings of A$1,750,760 and was later sold as broodmare for a record $3.85 million.

She is a bay mare by the leading sire Redoute's Choice out of Milliyet (NZ) (Zabeel-Foreign Copy). Samantha Miss was bred in New South Wales by G.D. Witters. She was purchased for $1.5 million at the 2007 yearling sales and earned $1,763,260 in 12 starts.

== Racing career ==
Samantha Miss had five starts as a two-year-old for two wins, including the Champagne Stakes. As a three-year-old, she had seven starts for five wins. In Sydney, she became the first filly since Angst, in 1993, to win all four legs of the Princess Series - the Silver Shadow Stakes, the Furious Stakes, the Tea Rose Stakes, and the Flight Stakes. In Melbourne, she took on the older horses when third in the Cox Plate and won the VRC Oaks by three lengths when she came back to her own age. In the new year, she finished a close second in the Light Fingers Stakes on a heavy track. A week later, Samantha Miss tore a tendon in training and, after weeks of consideration, was sent to the Australian Easter Broodmare Sale on 16 April 2009, where she was purchased by John Singleton. It was announced that she would be retired to stud and served by More Than Ready.

== Career results ==
Result	Date	Race	Venue	Distance	Class	Weight (kg)	Time	Jockey	Odds	Winner/2nd
1st	12/03/08	Wattle Grove Handicap	Kensington	1150m	Handicap	54.5 kg	1-07.95	Hugh Bowman	$1.75F	2nd - Packing Supreme
3rd	29/03/08	Sweet Embrace Stakes	Randwick	1200m	Group 3	55.5 kg	1-11.03	Hugh Bowman	$3.00F	1st - Stripper
4th	12/04/08	Magic Night Stakes	Rosehill	1200m	Group 2	55.5 kg	1-11.91	Hugh Bowman	$4.40	1st - Portillo
2nd	26/04/08	AJC Sires Produce Stakes	Randwick	1400m	Group 1	54.5 kg	1-25.99	Hugh Bowman	$12.00	1st - Sebring
1st	03/05/08	Champagne Stakes	Randwick	1600m	Group 1	54.4 kg	1-38.28	Hugh Bowman	$6.00	2nd - Sebring
1st	23/08/08	Silver Shadow Stakes	Warwick Farm	1200m	Group 3	58 kg	1-12.44	Hugh Bowman	$6.00	2nd - Glowlamp
1st	09/09/08	Furious Stakes	Randwick	1400m	Group 2	56 kg	1-26.21	Hugh Bow man	$2.20F	2nd - Love and Kisses
1st	20/09/08	Tea Rose Stakes	Rosehill	1500m	Group 2	56 kg	1-30.61	Hugh Bowman	$1.95F	2nd - Kimillsy
1st	04/10/08	Flight Stakes	Randwick	1600m	Group 1	56 kg	1-38.49	Hugh Bowman	$1.55F	2nd - Portillo
3rd	25/10/08	Cox Plate	Moonee Valley	2040m	Group 1	47.5 kg	2-06.92	Glen Boss	$4.60F	1st - Maldivian
1st	08/11/08	VRC Oaks	Flemington	2500m	Group 1	55.5 kg	2-37.57	Hugh Bowman	$1.85F	2nd - Miss Scarlatti
2nd	14/02/09	Light Fingers Stakes	Randwick	1200m	Group 2	56 kg	1-11.39	Hugh Bowman	$2.70F	1st - Rock Me Baby

== Stud record ==
On 12 August 2010 Samantha Miss foaled a bay filly by More Than Ready (USA).
