= Dean Yendall =

Australian jockey (born 1974)

Dean Yendall (born 1974) is an Australian jockey based in Victoria.

Yendall was born in Melbourne and grew up in the suburb of Westmeadows before moving to the country when he was 14. He began his riding career in 1991. He is a lightweight jockey, able to ride at 49 kilograms. He has twice won the Group One Empire Rose Stakes, on the three-year-old fillies I Am A Star in 2016 and Shoals in 2017, who each carried 49 kilograms.

Yendall has consistently ridden more than 100 winners a season, mostly in country races. Between 2011 and 2017 he won the Neville Wilson Medal, for the jockey with the most wins in the Victorian country season, in seven successive seasons. As of late September 2026, he has ridden 2,871 winners, including six in Group One races.

Yendall lives in Horsham with his wife, fellow jockey Christine Puls. In April 2016 they rode a dead heat at a race meeting at Mildura.
