= Flight (horse) =

Australian-bred Thoroughbred racehorse

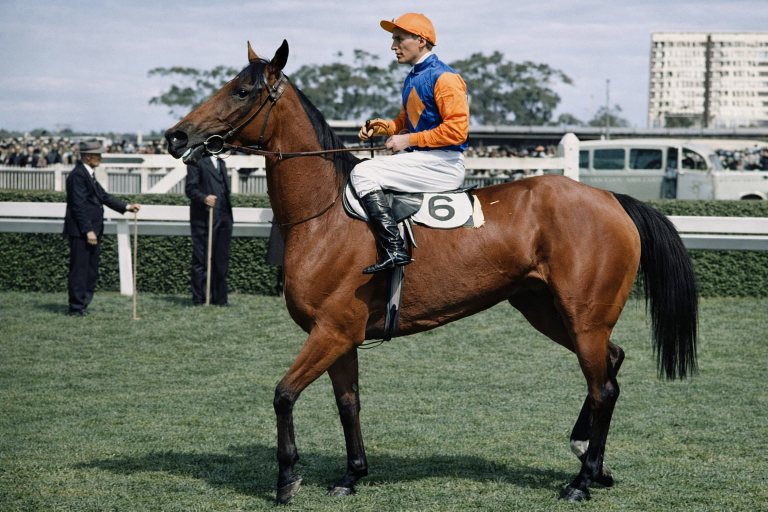
- Flight, and Jack O'Sullivan
- Sire: Royal Step
- Grandsire: Heroic
- Dam: Lambent (NZ)
- Damsire: Tractor (GB)
- Sex: Mare
- Foaled: 1940
- Country: Australia
- Colour: Bay
- Breeder: C.H.J. Schmidt, Merridong Stud
- Owner: Brian Crowley
- Trainer: Frank Nowland
- Record: 65: 24 - 19 - 9
- Earnings: £31,429 (A$62,858)

Major wins
- AJC Champagne Stakes (1943); Hobartville Stakes (1943); Craven Plate (1943, 1945); Adrian Knox Stakes (1944); Warwick Stakes (1944); Colin Stephen Stakes (1944); W S Cox Plate (1945, 1946); C F Orr Stakes (1946); St George Stakes (1946); Essendon Stakes (1946, 1947); AJC Plate (1946); LKS Mackinnon Stakes (1946)

Honours
- Australian Racing Hall of Fame (2007); Flight Stakes at Randwick Racecourse
- Last updated on 14 June 2011

Flight, and Jack Thompson

Flight (1940–1953) was an Australian Thoroughbred racemare that was the highest stakes winning mare in Australasia. Her courageous efforts made her a crowd favourite during the post-World War II era and she had victories over some of the great horses of the time including Shannon, Bernborough, Royal Gem and Russia.

She was a bay daughter of Royal Step; her dam was the unplaced mare, Lambent (NZ) by Tractor (GB). A half-sister to Flight, Sparkle (NZ) by Colonel Cygnus (GB), won the 1940 Dunedin Cup. Flight was inbred to Chelandry and also to St Simon in the fourth and fifth (4x5) generations. She was purchased at the 1942 Sydney yearling sales by Brian Crowley (a future chairman of the AJC) for 60 guineas.

== 1944 racebook ==
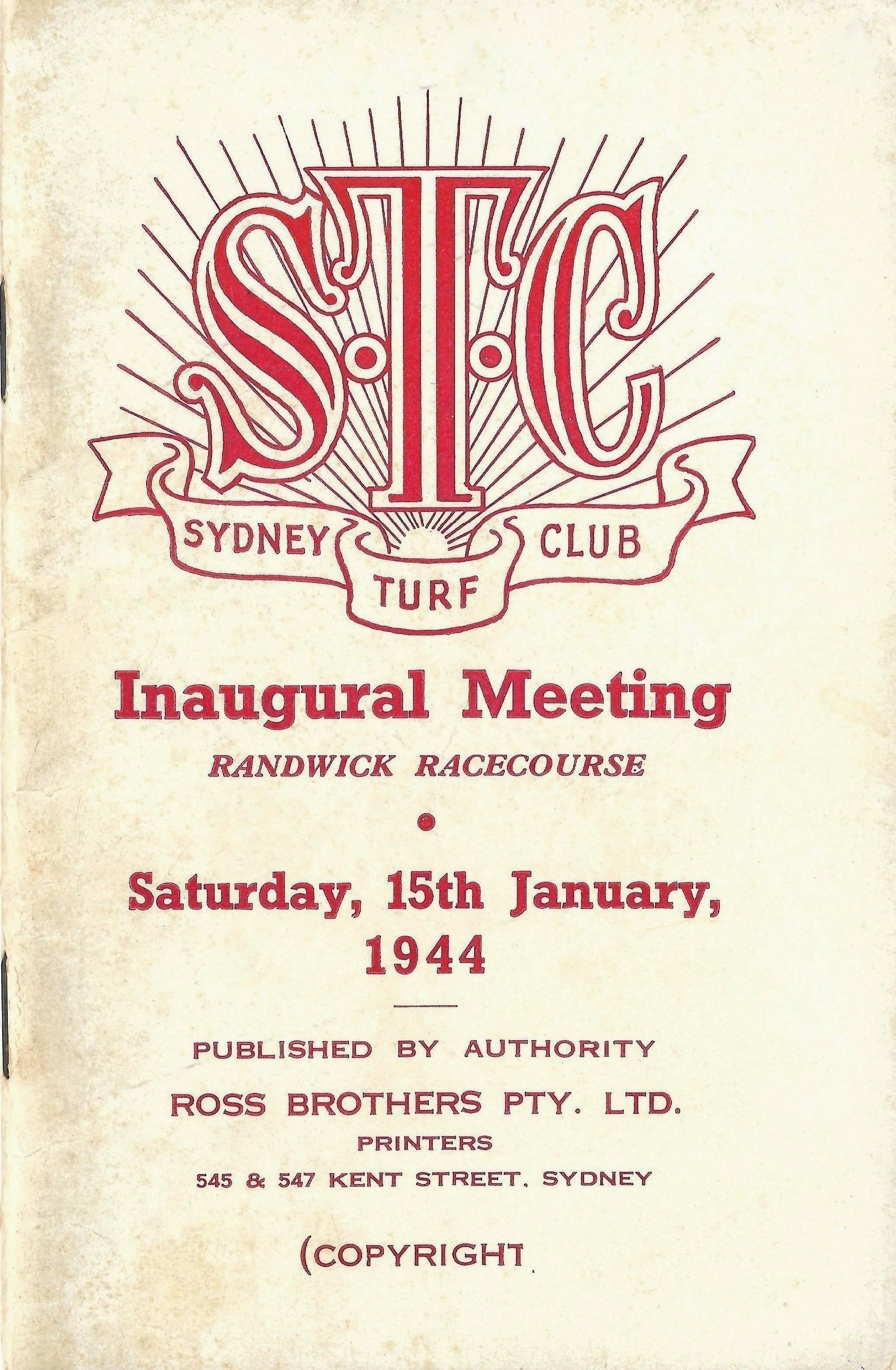
Front cover of the 1944 Lord Mayor’s Cup racebook

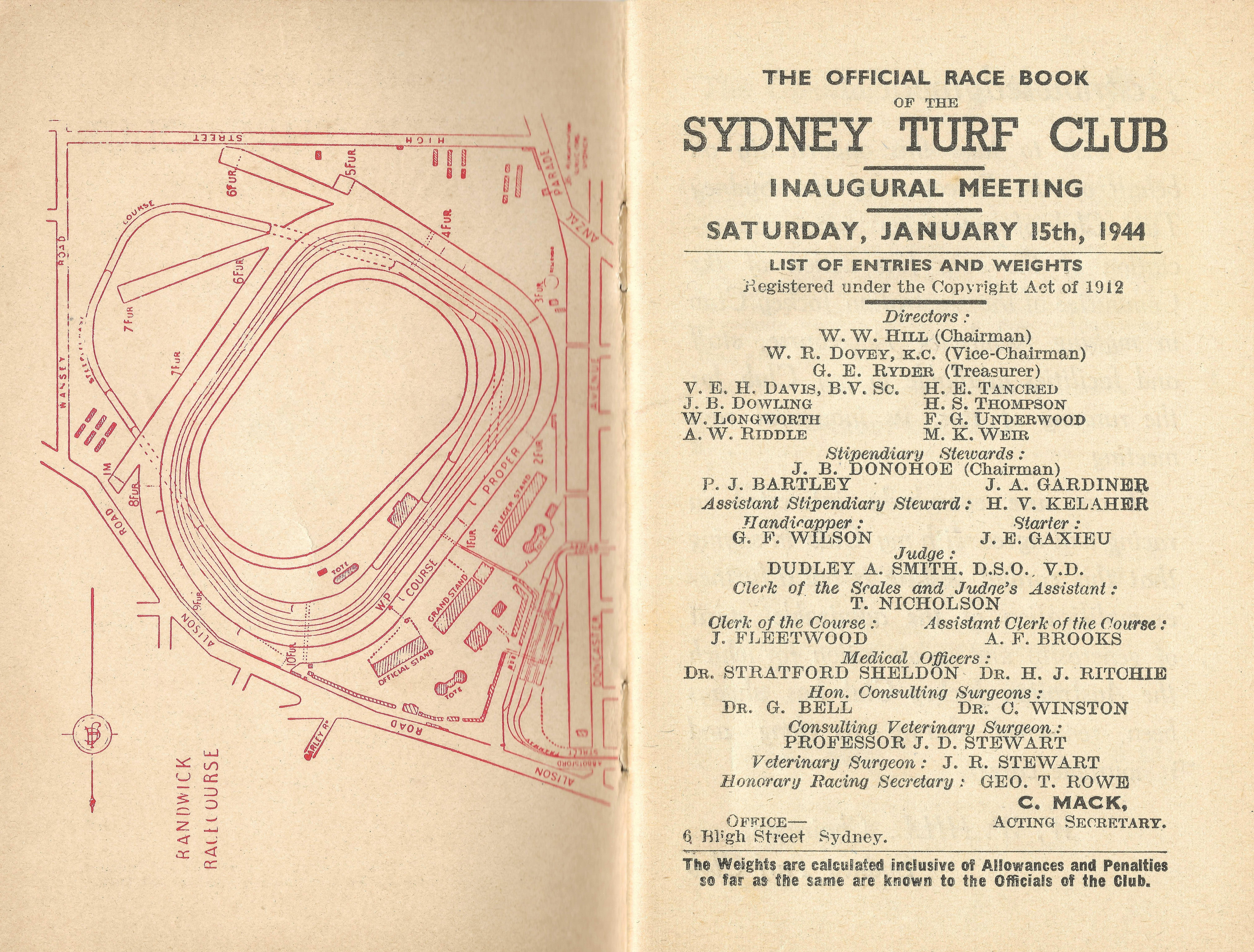
1944 Lord Mayor’s Cup showing raceday officials

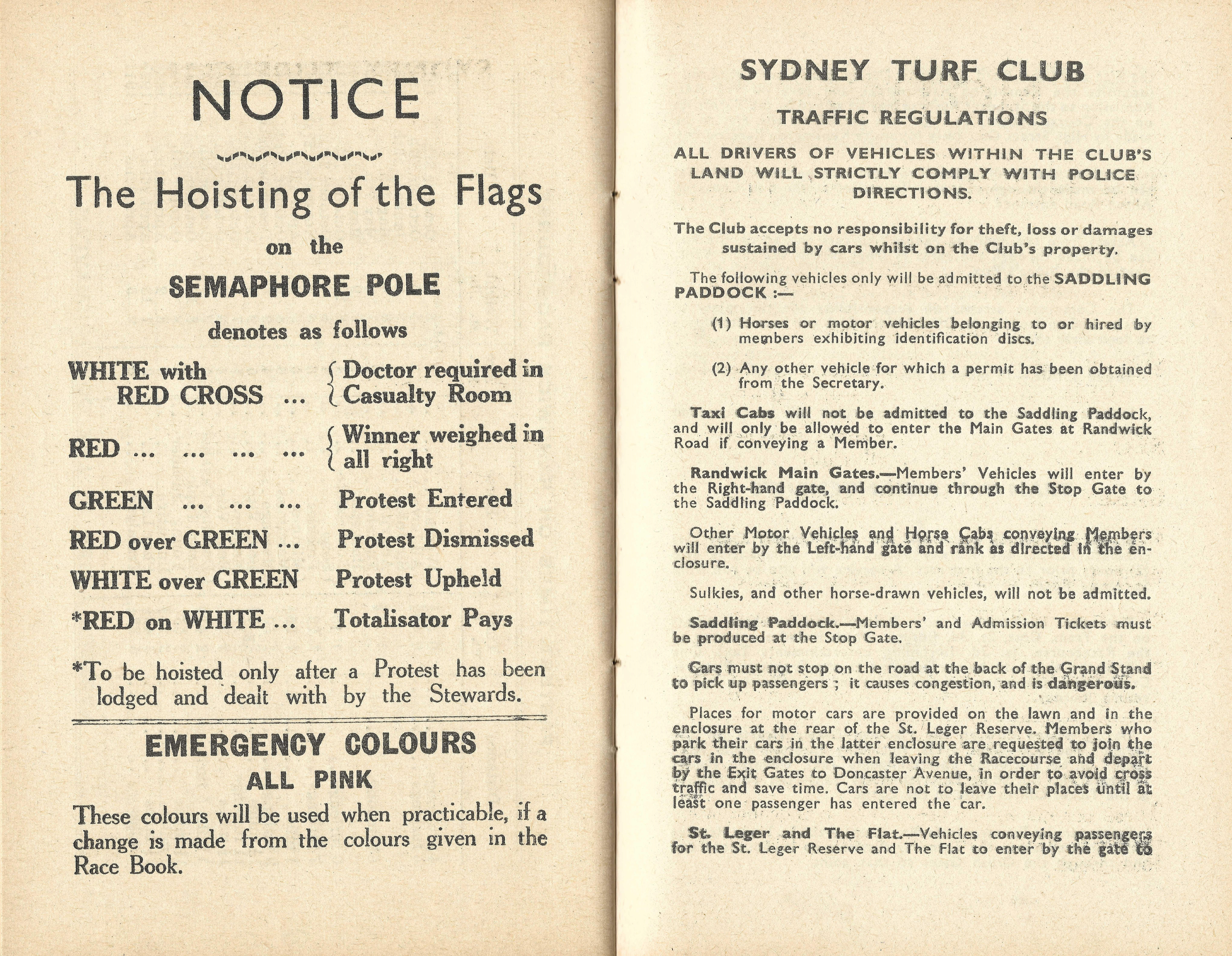
1944 Lord Mayor’s Cup racebook showing semaphore flags

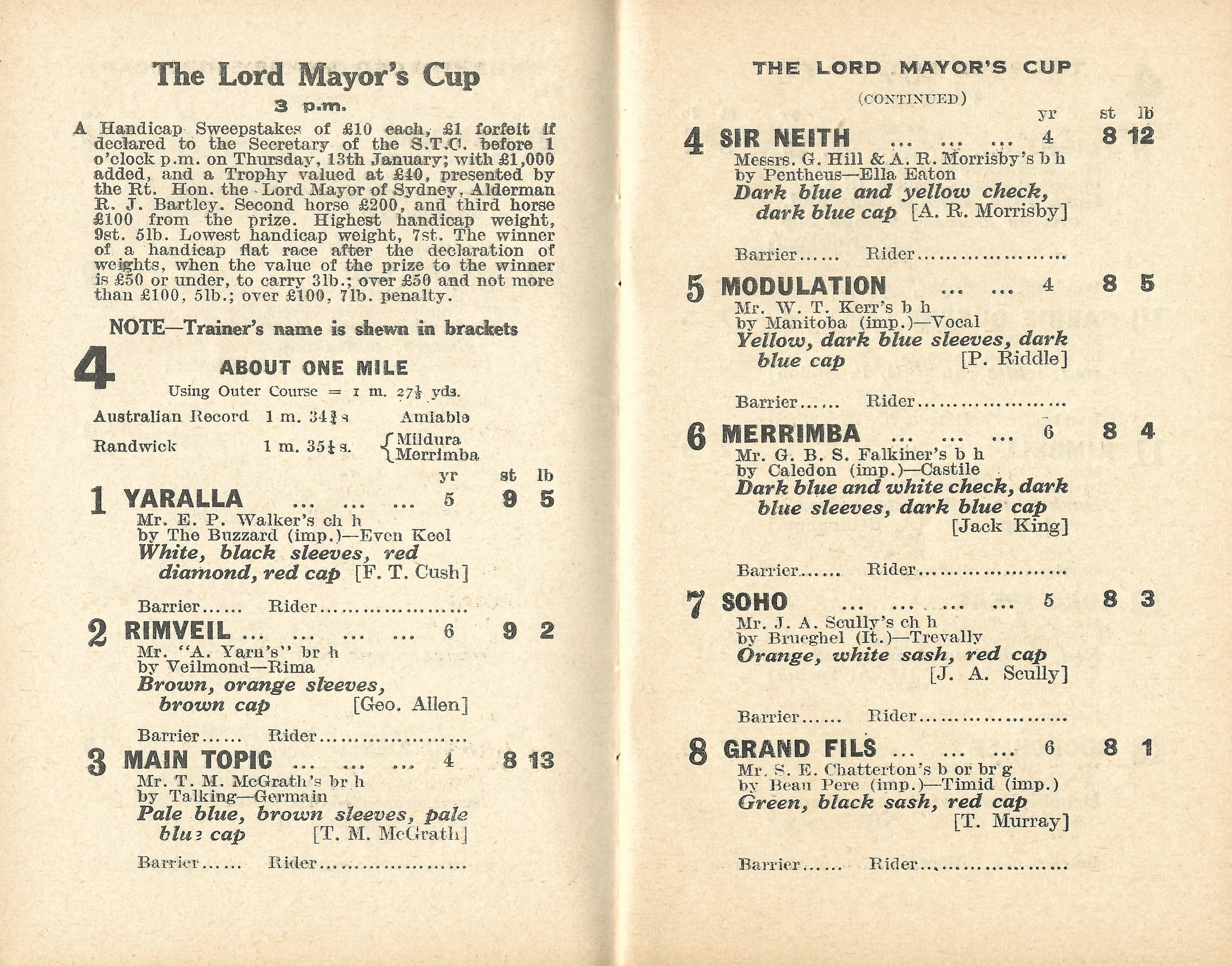
1944 Lord Mayor’s Cup showing starters & results

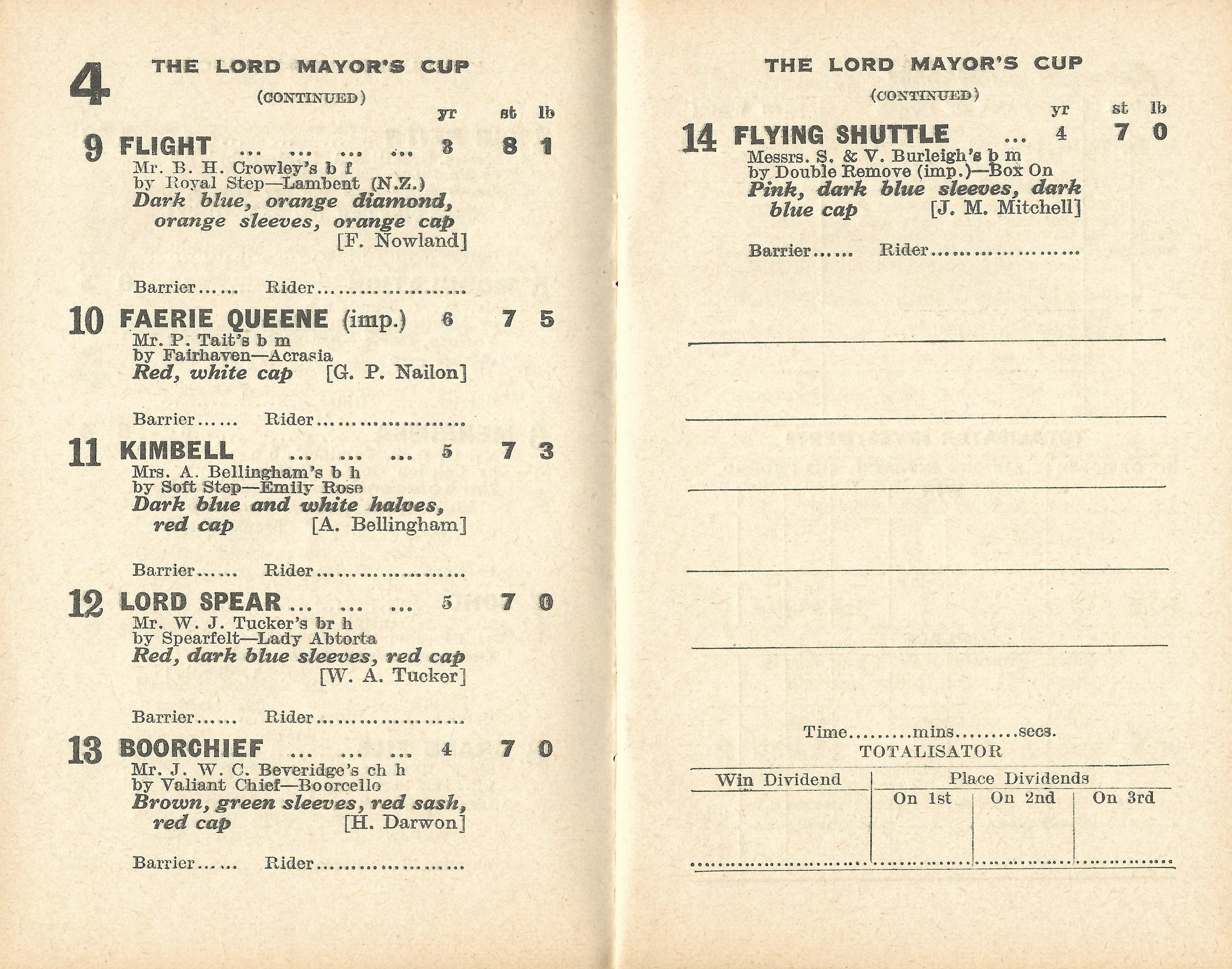
Starters and results showing the winner, Flight

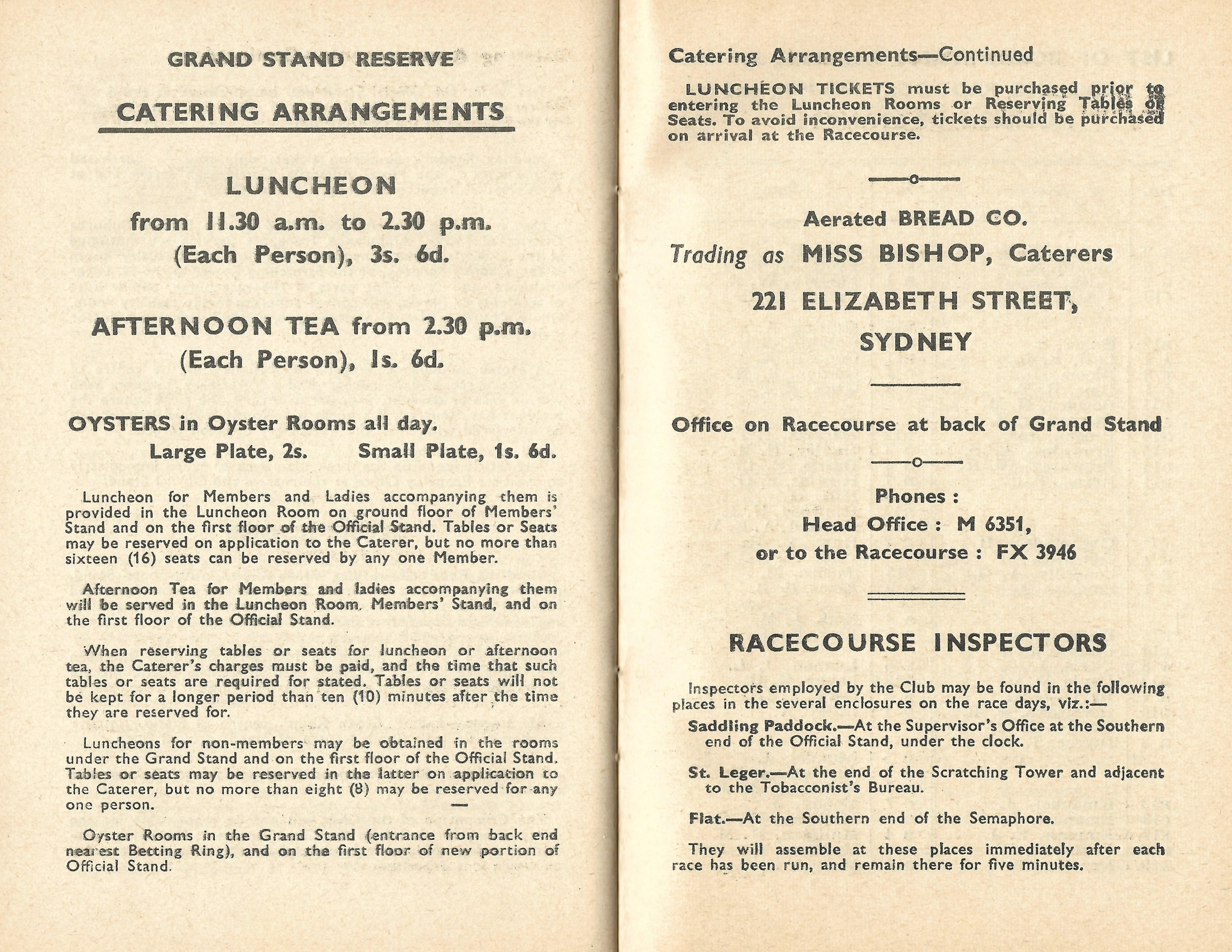
1944 Lord Mayor’s Cup showing catering arrangements

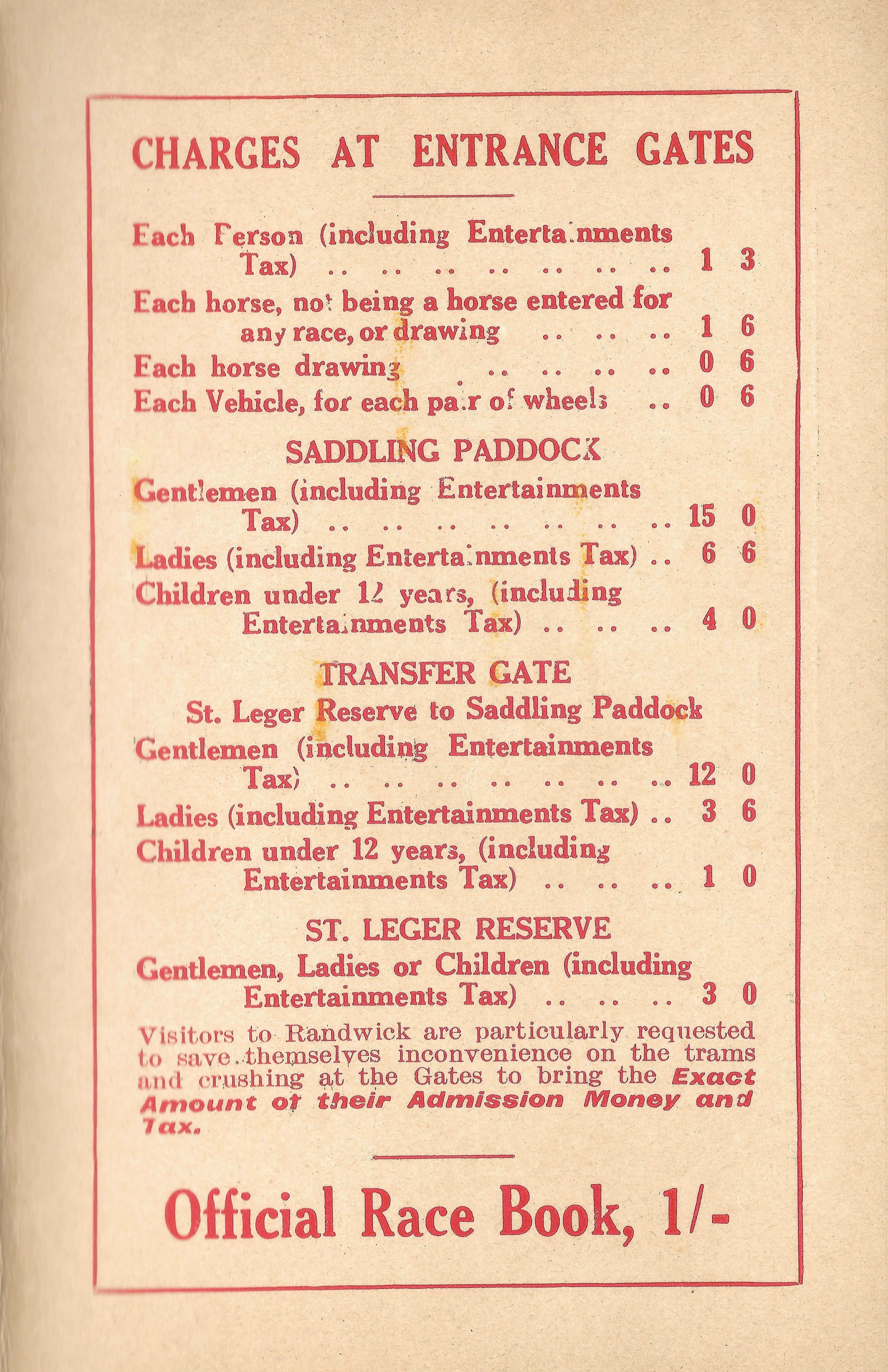
Back cover showing railway & entrance charges

== 1946 racebook ==
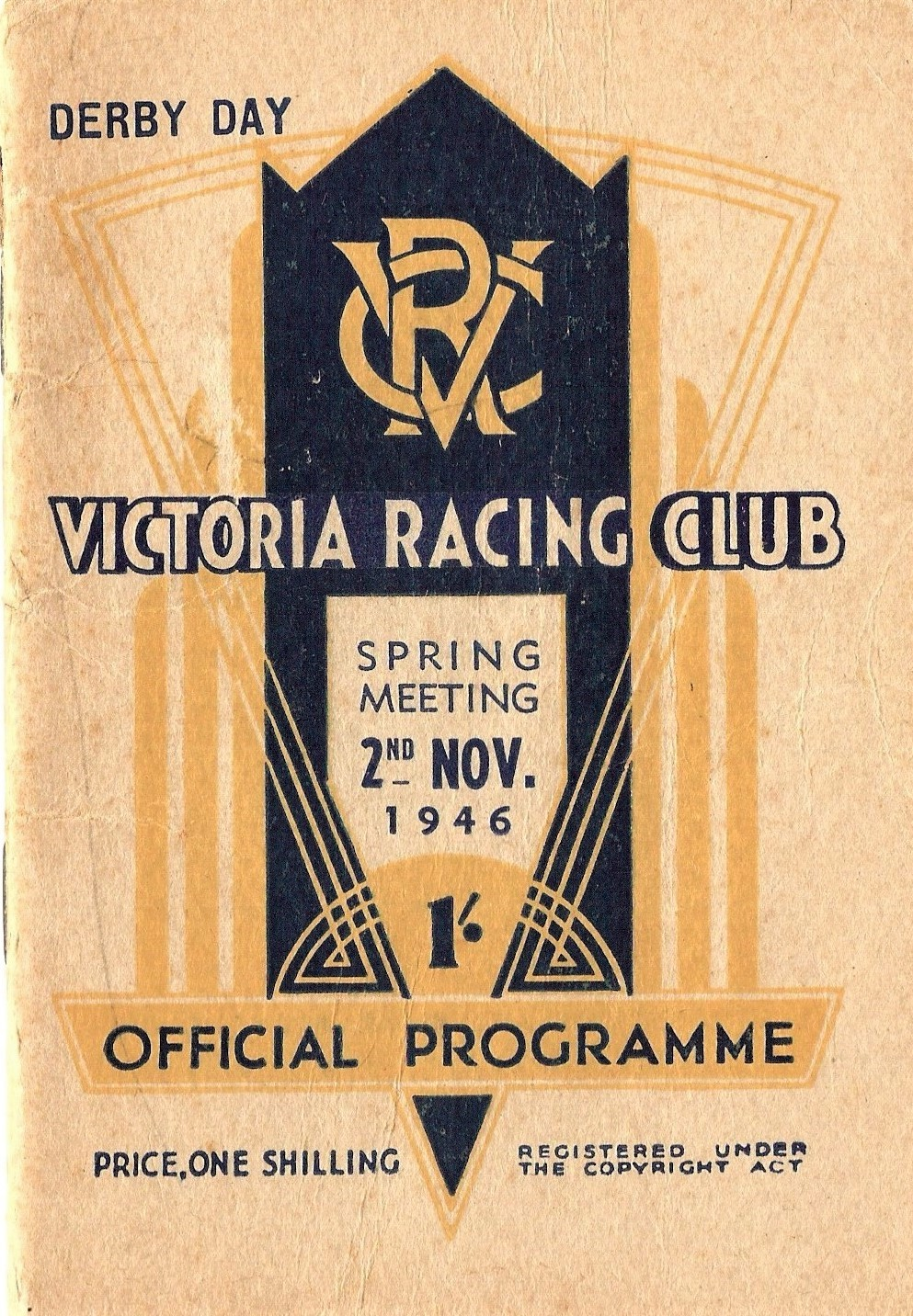
Front cover of the 1946 L.K.S. Mackinnon Stakes racebook

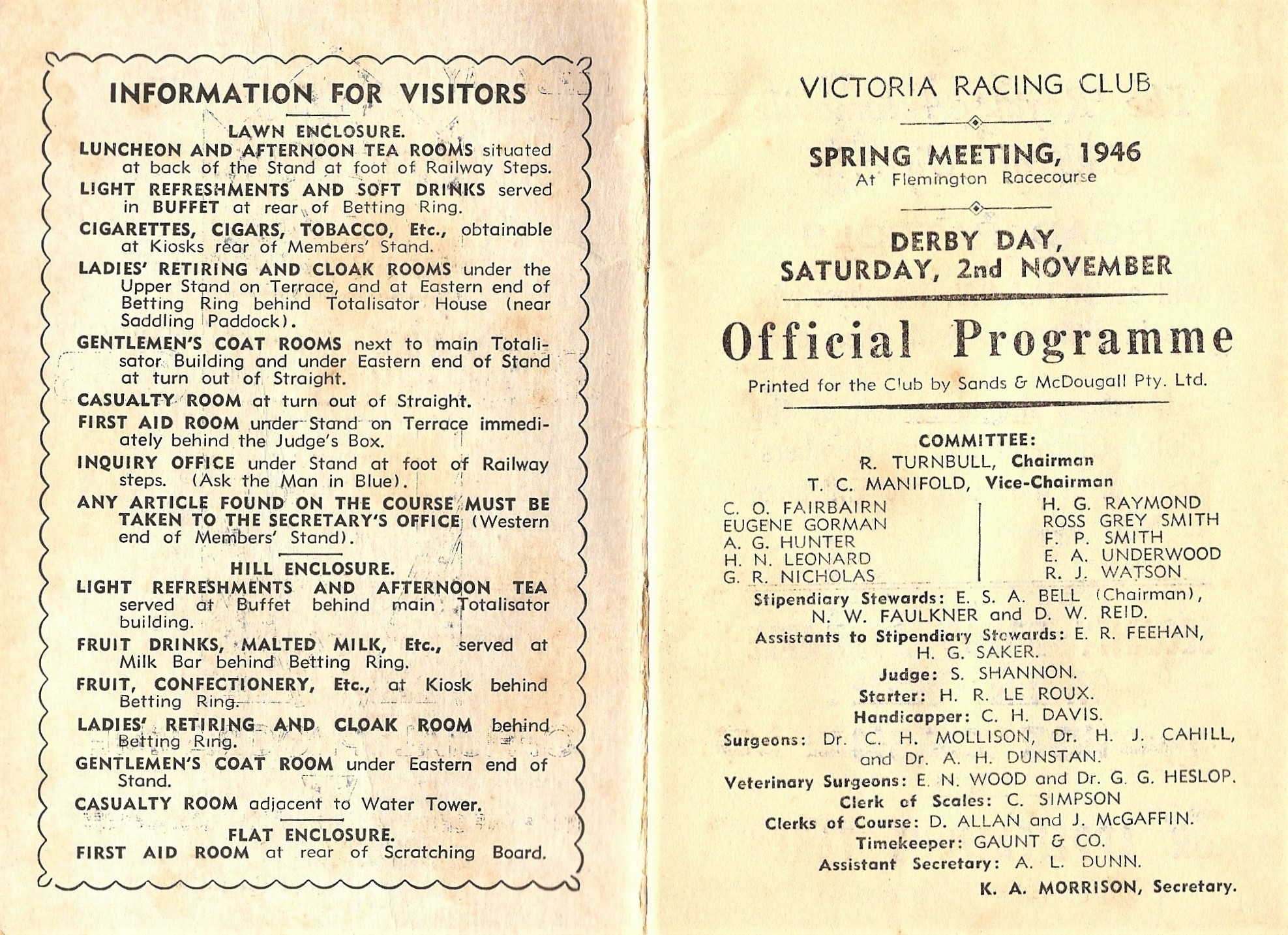
Inside cover showing raceday officials

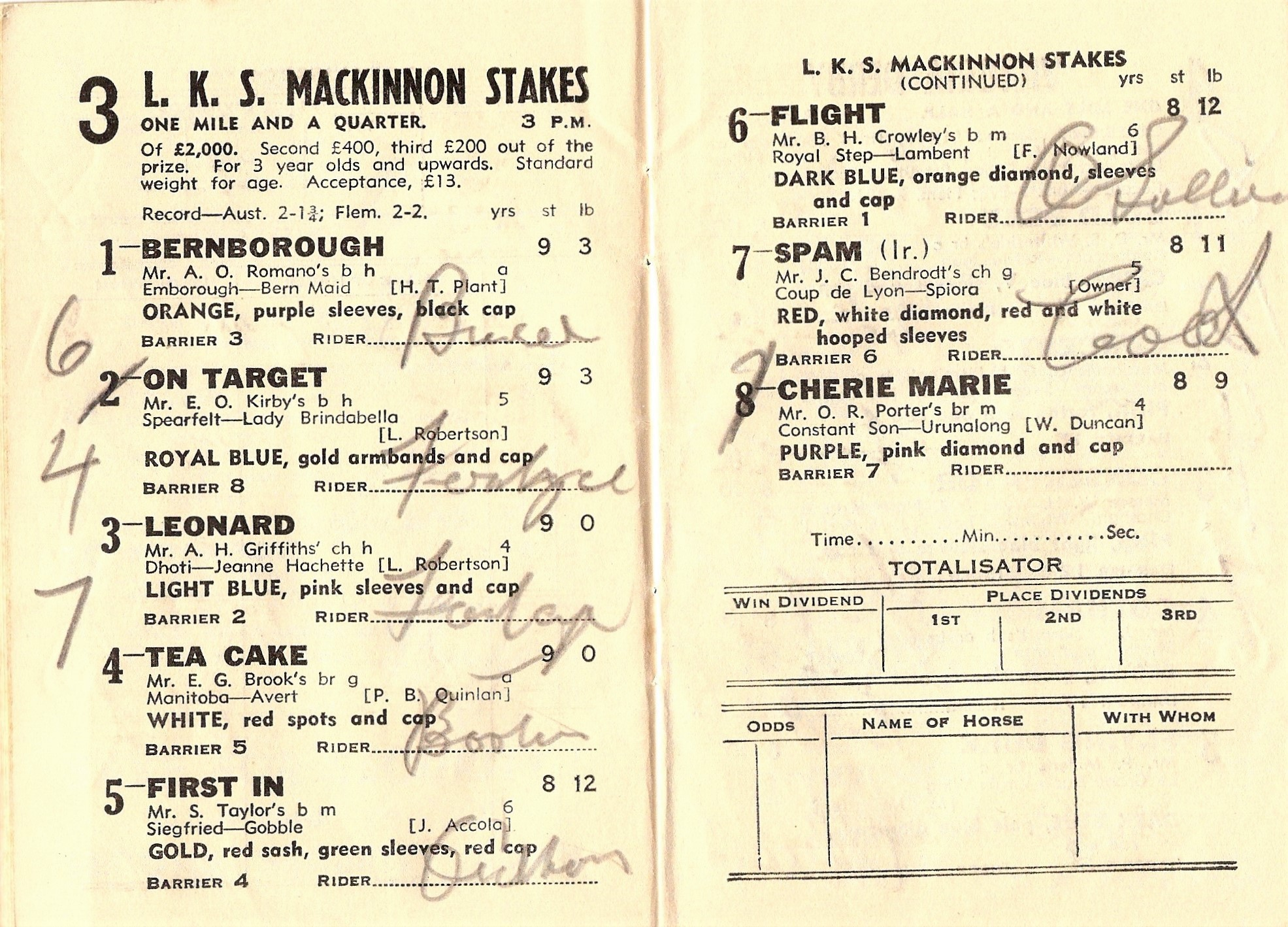
Starters and results showing the winner, Flight

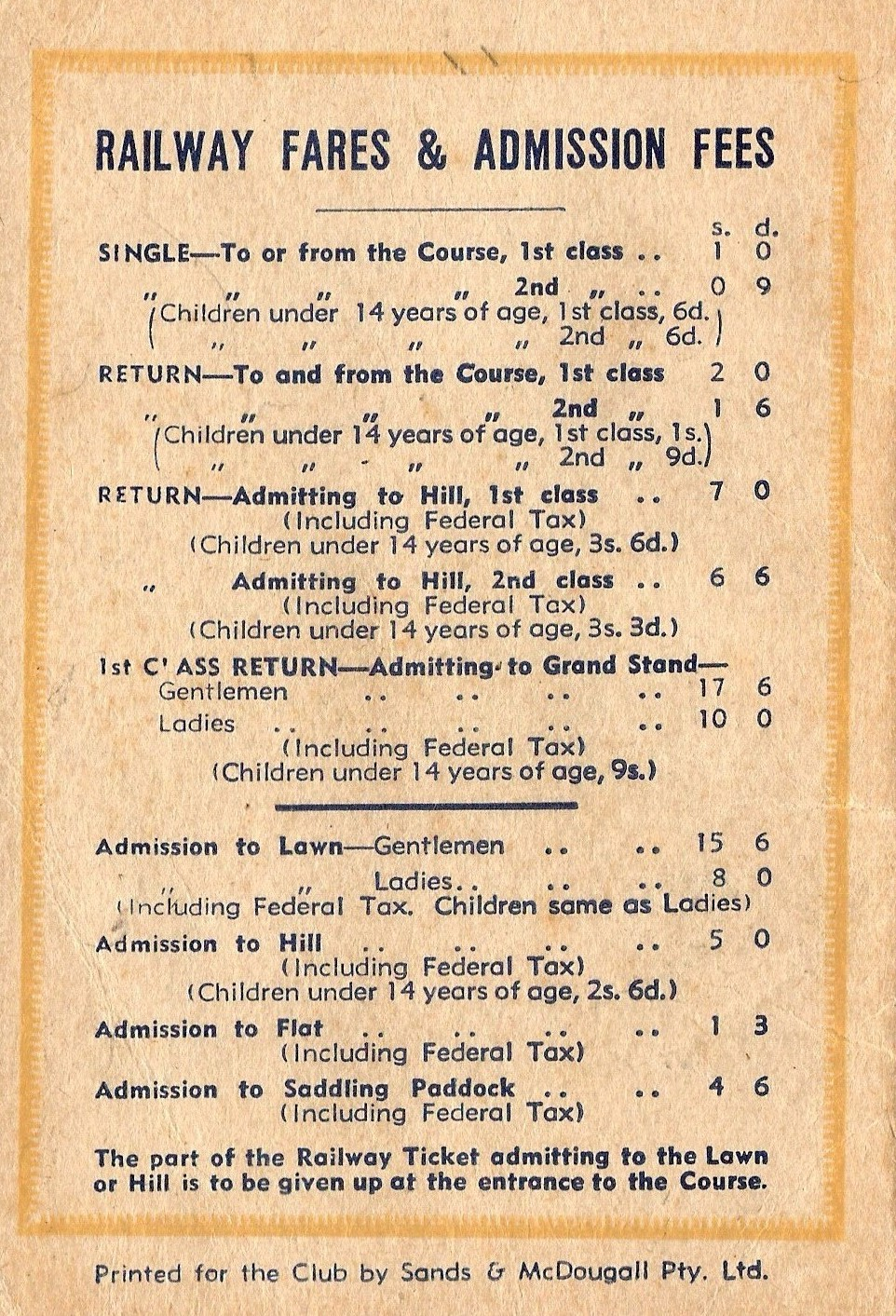
Back cover showing entrance & railway charges

== Race record ==
A consistent performer, Flight raced at the highest level for five seasons until she was a six-year-old winning 24 races including the 1945 and 1946 MVRC W.S.Cox Plate and the 1946 VRC L.K.S. MacKinnon Stakes. She also placed in such races as the Sydney Cup, AJC Metropolitan Handicap and the AJC Chipping Norton Stakes.

=== At two years ===
Flight won her first race, the A.J.C. December Nursery. Later that season she won the A.J.C. Havilah Handicap, Rosehill Nursery Handicap, Champagne Stakes and the Victoria Park Juvenile Handicap (by 2½ lengths and carrying 9 stone 7 pounds). She was second, by a head to Mayfowl (who later won the A.J.C. St Leger), in the AJC Sires Produce Stakes, and ran third in the A.J.C. Valicare Handicap.

=== At three years ===
At three years Flight won the A.J.C. Oaks, Hobartville Stakes, the Craven Plate, S.T.C. Lord Mayor's Cup, Adrian Knox Stakes, the Australia Day Handicap, and the Quality Handicap at Randwick Racecourse. She was second in the A.J.C. Derby, the Doncaster Handicap (defeated by half a head to Goose Boy) and the Weight-for-age (w.f.a.) A.J.C. All-Aged Stakes. Her two thirds were both at Rosehill—in the Rosehill Guineas and the (w.f.a.) Rawson Stakes.

=== At four years ===
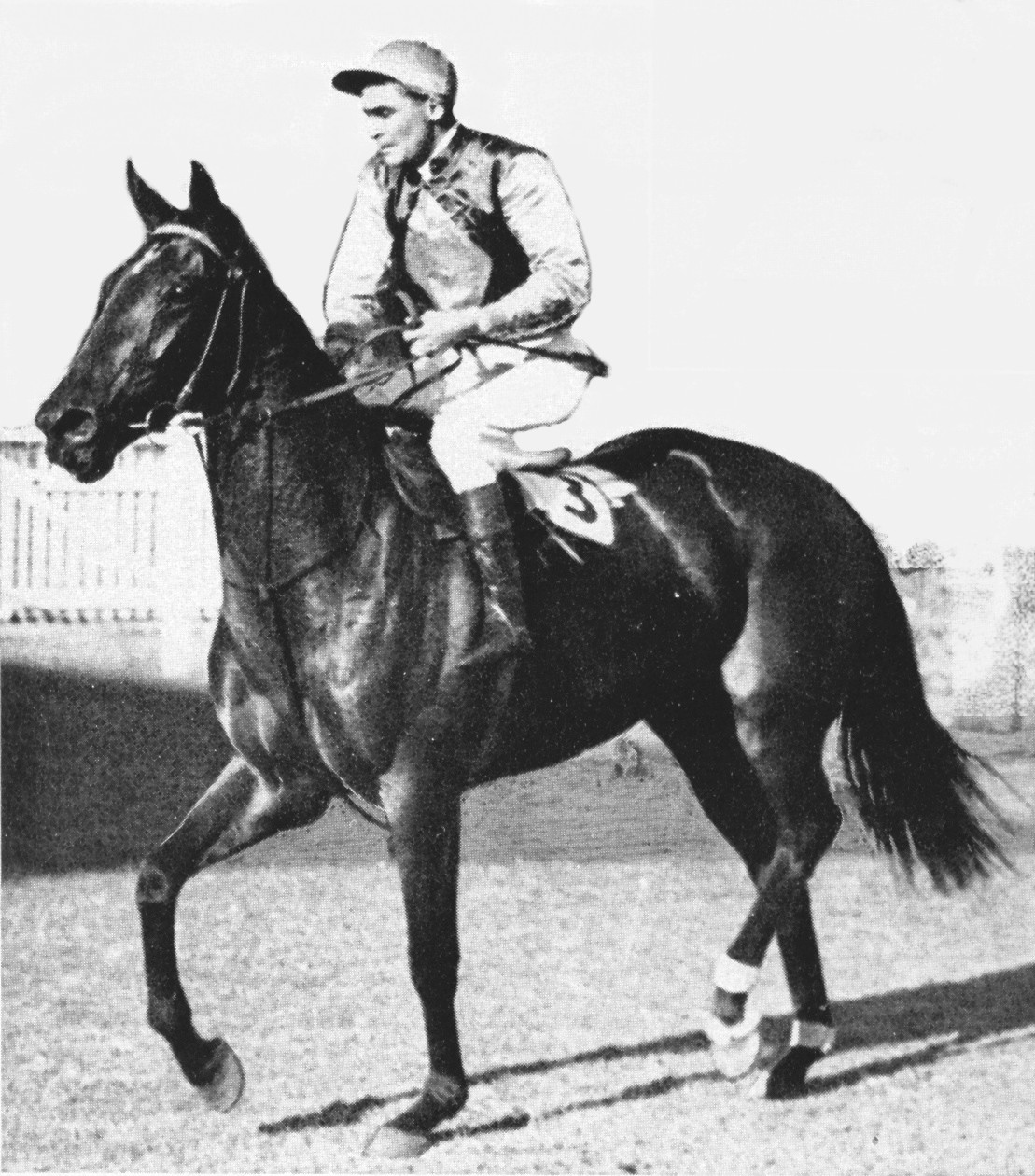
Flight, with Jack O'Sullivan up, c.1944

Flight had 12 race starts for two victories in the A.J.C. Warwick Stakes and Colin Stephen Stakes, defeating Katanga on each occasion. Carrying 8 stone 10 pounds (55 kg) she was defeated by a length by Nightbeam (7.2) in the AJC Metropolitan Handicap, and was narrowly beaten by Katanga in both A.J.C. Chipping Norton Stakes and Autumn Stakes. Her third placings were in the Craven Plate and the Sydney Cup and A.J.C. Plate, in which in the two latter races Craigie, Russia and Flight finished in the same order on each occasion.

=== At five years ===
She started eighteen times for 8 wins, 6 seconds and 1 third placing. In the Craven Plate Flight defeated Shannon and Russia; carrying the top weight she won the A.J.C. Phar Lap Handicap by a margin of four lengths with three lengths back to the third place-getter. In Melbourne she won the W.S.Cox Plate, the C. F. Orr Stakes, V.A.T.C. St George Stakes, V.R.C. Essendon Stakes, and C. M. Lloyd Stakes. Returning to Sydney, Flight won the A.J.C. Plate. Flight had defeated good horses such as Royal Gem, Russia and Tranquil Star. In the A.J.C. Chipping Norton Stakes, Bernborough relegated Flight into second place, by a head, with Russia a distant third 10 lengths away. Flight's other second placings included those in the Tramway Handicap, the L. K. S. Mackinnon Stakes and A.J.C. Autumn Stakes. Flight had two starts in Brisbane, finishing unplaced in the Doomben Ten Thousand and second to Tea Cake in the Q.T.C. El Alamein Stakes.

=== At six years ===
Flight had wins in the W. S. Cox Plate, L. K. S. Mackinnon Stakes and in the Essendon Stakes. She was second in the Rosehill Hill Stakes (to Bernborough), the Linlithgow Stakes, C. F. Orr Stakes and twice to Shannon (in the George Main Stakes and King's Cup).

Summary: Flight had 65 starts for 24 wins, 18 seconds and 9 thirds and earnings of £31,429.

== Stud record ==
Retired to stud as Australia’s highest stakes winning mare she produced only five foals before her death in September 1953, due to an internal haemorrhage.

Flight’s only daughter, Flight's Daughter (by Helios) produced the top-class Skyline, winner of the 1958 STC Golden Slipper Stakes and AJC Derby. His full-brother Sky High won the 1960 Golden Slipper Stakes and VRC Derby. Both of these were by the leading sire, Star Kingdom.

A race named in honour of Flight, the AJC Flight Stakes is contested annually. The race is a Group One event and is contested over 1,600 metres for three-year-old fillies at set weights.

In 2007, Flight was inducted into the Australian Racing Hall of Fame.

== Pedigree ==
Pedigree of Flight (AUS), bay mare, 1940
Sire Royal Step (AUS) 1933	Heroic; 1921	Valais	Cicero
Sire Royal Step (AUS) 1933	Heroic; 1921	Valais	Lily of the Valley
Sire Royal Step (AUS) 1933	Heroic; 1921	Chersonese	Cylgad
Sire Royal Step (AUS) 1933	Heroic; 1921	Chersonese	Chelandry
Sire Royal Step (AUS) 1933	Roseflight; 1926	Rossendale	St Frusquin
Sire Royal Step (AUS) 1933	Roseflight; 1926	Rossendale	Menda
Sire Royal Step (AUS) 1933	Roseflight; 1926	Flying Lem	Lemberg
Sire Royal Step (AUS) 1933	Roseflight; 1926	Flying Lem	Flying Countess
Dam Lambent (NZ) 1927	Tractor (GB); 1918	The Tetrarch	Roi Herode
Dam Lambent (NZ) 1927	Tractor (GB); 1918	The Tetrarch	Vahren
Dam Lambent (NZ) 1927	Tractor (GB); 1918	Gravitation	St Simon
Dam Lambent (NZ) 1927	Tractor (GB); 1918	Gravitation	Gravity
Dam Lambent (NZ) 1927	Dazzling Light; 1921	Kilbroney	The Wag
Dam Lambent (NZ) 1927	Dazzling Light; 1921	Kilbroney	Innismakil
Dam Lambent (NZ) 1927	Dazzling Light; 1921	Simper	Symington
Dam Lambent (NZ) 1927	Dazzling Light; 1921	Simper	Chelys (Family: 1-n)
