= Sweet Idea =

Australian-bred Thoroughbred racehorse

- Sire: Snitzel
- Grandsire: Redoute's Choice
- Dam: Flidais
- Damsire: Timber Country
- Sex: Mare
- Foaled: 2010
- Country: Australia
- Colour: Chestnut
- Breeder: Arrowfield Stud
- Owner: David Henderson, Luke Henderson, Nick Vass Bloodstock, Wayne Cook, Danny Maher, Grant Scott, Tracy Vogel, Beric Lynton, Campbell Brown & Matthew Allen
- Trainer: Gai Waterhouse
- Record: 19: 8-7-1
- Earnings: $2,415,350

Major wins
- Silver Slipper (2013); Light Fingers Stakes (2014); Missile Stakes (2014); Tristarc Stakes (2014); The Galaxy (2015)

Sweet Idea (born September 22, 2010) is a Thoroughbred racehorse who was bred in Australia. On retirement in April 2015, Sweet Idea was the richest mare her age (or younger) in the world. She is the most successful horse in Magic Millions of all time, having placed second in the two-year-old Gold Coast Magic Millions (2012) and going on to win the three-year-old Gold Coast Magic Millions (2013) – no horse has ever won both races. She was the winner of the Group 1 Canadian Club Galaxy and a multiple Group race winner.

== Background ==
Sweet Idea is by leading sire Snitzel (by Redoute's Choice) out of Flidais (by Timber Country).

== Racing career ==
Trained by Gai Waterhouse, Sweet Idea won her first race as a two-year-old at Randwick on October 20, 2012, setting a class record for 1000 metres of 57.39 seconds. Sweet Idea went on to a successful career as a two-year-old, winning the Group 2 Silver Slipper, placing second in the Gold Coast Magic Millions, and 3rd in the Group 1 Golden Slipper. As a three-year-old sweet idea won the 3yo Gold Coast Magic Millions, the 3yo Wyong Magic Millions, the Group 2 Light Fingers Stakes and was second in the Group 1 Coolmore Classic. At Age 4, Sweet Idea won the Group 1 Galaxy, the Group 2 Missile Stakes and the Group 2 Tristarc Stakes. In addition as a four-year-old, Sweet Idea finished 2nd in the Group 1 Myer Classic and the Group 1 Memsie Stakes before being retired in April 2015. Sweet Idea retired after 19 starts having been placed 16 times. Her career earnings were $2,415,350.

== Pedigree ==
Pedigree of Sweet Idea (AUD), Chestnut Mare, 2010
Sire Snitzel (AUS) 2002	Redoute's Choice (AUS); 1996	Danehill (USA)	Danzig (USA)
Sire Snitzel (AUS) 2002	Redoute's Choice (AUS); 1996	Danehill (USA)	Rayzana (USA)
Sire Snitzel (AUS) 2002	Redoute's Choice (AUS); 1996	Shantha's Choice (AUS)	Canny Lad (AUS)
Sire Snitzel (AUS) 2002	Redoute's Choice (AUS); 1996	Shantha's Choice (AUS)	Dancing Show (USA)
Sire Snitzel (AUS) 2002	Snippets' Lass (AUS); 1993	Snippetts (AUS)	Lunchtime (GB)
Sire Snitzel (AUS) 2002	Snippets' Lass (AUS); 1993	Snippetts (AUS)	Easy Date (AUS)
Sire Snitzel (AUS) 2002	Snippets' Lass (AUS); 1993	Snow Finch (IRE)	Storm Bird (CAN)
Sire Snitzel (AUS) 2002	Snippets' Lass (AUS); 1993	Snow Finch (IRE)	A Realgirl (USA)
Dam Flidais (AUS) 1999	Timber Country (USA); 1992	Woodman (USA)	Mr Prospector (USA)
Dam Flidais (AUS) 1999	Timber Country (USA); 1992	Woodman (USA)	Playmate (USA)
Dam Flidais (AUS) 1999	Timber Country (USA); 1992	Fall Aspen (USA)	Pretense (USA)
Dam Flidais (AUS) 1999	Timber Country (USA); 1992	Fall Aspen (USA)	Change Water (USA)
Dam Flidais (AUS) 1999	Electronic (NZ); 1990	First Norman (USA)	Cougar (CHI)
Dam Flidais (AUS) 1999	Electronic (NZ); 1990	First Norman (USA)	Ganancia (CHI)
Dam Flidais (AUS) 1999	Electronic (NZ); 1990	Aegean Blue (NZ)	Blue Vermillion (GB)
Dam Flidais (AUS) 1999	Electronic (NZ); 1990	Aegean Blue (NZ)	Agean Sea (NZ)
