= Thoroughbred Breeders Stakes =

- Class: Group 3
- Location: Flemington Racecourse
- Inaugurated: 1971
- Race type: Thoroughbred
- Sponsor: Thoroughbred Breeders Victoria (2026)

Race information
- Distance: 1,200 metres
- Surface: Turf
- Qualification: Two year old fillies
- Weight: Set weights with penalties
- Purse: $200,000 (2026)

The Thoroughbred Breeders Stakes is a Victoria Racing Club Group 3 Thoroughbred horse race for fillies aged two years old, run at set weights with penalties, over a distance of 1200 metres. It is held at Flemington Racecourse in Melbourne, Australia in March during the VRC Autumn Racing Carnival.

== History ==
=== Name ===
- 1971–1990 - Bloodhorse Breeders Plate
- 1991–2000 - Bloodhorse Breeders Stakes
- 2001 onwards - Thoroughbred Breeders Stakes

=== Distance ===
- 1971–1972 - 7 furlongs (~1400 metres)
- 1973–1995 – 1400 metres
- 1996 onwards held over 1200 metres

=== Grade ===
- 1971–1979 - Principal Race
- 1980–1998 - Group 2
- 1999 onwards - Group 3

=== Venue ===
In 2007 the race was run at Caulfield Racecourse due to reconstruction of Flemington Racecourse.

== Winners ==
The following are past winners of the race.

- 2026 - Satono Glow
- 2025 - Recuperato
- 2024 - Tobeornottobe
- 2023 - Bossy Nic
- 2022 - Ruthless Dame
- 2021 - La Rocque
- 2020 - Minhaaj
- 2019 - ^ Flit/ Ready Set Sail
- 2018 - Khulaasa
- 2017 - Shoals
- 2016 - Thyme For Roses
- 2015 - Pasadena Girl
- 2014 - Clifton Red
- 2013 - Montsegur
- 2012 - Snitzerland
- 2011 - Triple Asset
- 2010 - Shaaheq
- 2009 - My Emotion
- 2008 - Oval Affair
- 2007 - Rose Ceremony
- 2006 - Nediym’s Glow
- 2005 - Leveller
- 2004 - One World
- 2003 - Living Spirit
- 2002 - Dama De Noche
- 2001 - Balbina
- 2000 - Crowned Glory
- 1999 - Gilded Angel
- 1998 - Glammis
- 1997 - It’s A Giggle
- 1996 - Zeya
- 1995 - Hello Darl
- 1994 - Mellow Chateau
- 1993 - Fine Recipe
- 1992 - Love Comes To Town
- 1991 - Excited Angel
- 1990 - Apollo Wonder
- 1989 - Reganza
- 1988 - Grey Fille
- 1987 - Twining
- 1986 - Wolvette
- 1985 - Twirled
- 1984 - Irradiate
- 1983 - Truly Unfaithful
- 1982 - Torn Monarch
- 1981 - Rose Of Kingston
- 1980 - Bagala Miss
- 1979 - Lowan Star
- 1978 - Outpace
- 1977 - Red Cat
- 1976 - Vivarchi
- 1975 - Denise’s Joy
- 1974 - Mulligatawny
- 1973 - Hunza
- 1972 - Sabot
- 1971 - Gossiper

^ Dead heat

== See also ==
- Australian Cup
- List of Australian Group races
- Group races
