= Shoals (horse) =

Australian-bred Thoroughbred racehorse

- Sire: Fastnet Rock
- Grandsire: Danehill
- Dam: The Broken Shore
- Damsire: Hussonet
- Sex: Mare
- Foaled: 16 August 2014
- Country: Australia
- Colour: bay
- Owner: Pinecliff Racing and Arrowfield Pastoral Pty Ltd
- Trainer: Anthony Freedman
- Record: 15-7-4-1
- Earnings: A$2,535,270

Major wins
- Thoroughbred Breeders Stakes (G3)(2017); Percy Sykes Stakes (G2)(2017); Myer Classic (G1)(2017); Surround Stakes (G1)(2018); Robert Sangster Stakes (G1)(2018)
- Last updated on 1 April 2019

Shoals is a retired Thoroughbred racehorse and broodmare trained and bred in Australia. She won three Group One races and over two and half million dollars over her career.

== Career ==
Shoals made her debut on 21 February 2017 at Seymour, winning by 4 lengths. 4 weeks later, she won the Group 3 Thoroughbred Breeders Stakes. Opening with bookies at $7, she was backed into $2.70 by the start of the race, winning by half a length.

Travelling to Sydney for the Group 2 Percy Sykes Stakes, Shoals was a "well supported" favourite in a "gritty win", coming from 2nd last down the straight to win by a half head. Trainer Anthony Freedman said, "She's a very tenacious filly. I don't think she really handled the ground all that well but she just has a great will to win."

After a 154-day spell, Shoals returned in a listed race at Moonee Valley, winning her 4th consecutive race by 3/4 of a length. Jockey Mark Zahra said, "as soon as I got in front she had her head in the air going to the post. If something had challenged on the outside I would have just been off and gone again."

On 1 October 2017, Shoals contested the Thousand Guineas Prelude, running second to Booker. A fortnight later, blinkers were put on for the Group 1 Thousand Guineas, where she again ran 2nd.

The only filly in the Myer Classic weight-for-age race for females, and with new jockey Dean Yendall aboard, Shoals won her first Group 1 race by half a head. Freedman said, "We were initially a little disappointed with her last run. The winner has proven to be high quality and we got confident when that filly won last Saturday."

After a three month break, Shoals finished eighth of nine in the Kevin Hayes Stakes in February 2018. She was given another trial before winning her 2nd Group 1, The Surround Stakes, in March. With Blake Shin suspended, Joshua Parr was given the ride. He said, "I’m lost for words to be honest. It is never nice for someone’s misfortune to become my good fortune but gee, the amount of times that happens in this industry, and probably life itself, it’s uncanny how it works. She is a very tough filly and that's what she showed out there."

On 5 May, Shoals won the Robert Sangster Stakes, where it was said she, "smashed some of Australia’s best racemares with a devastating show of acceleration." With her connections intending to contest events in England from June, there was then a possible change of plans. "A couple of hours after the race, interest was shown by an Everest slot-holder. Over the next two or three months we’re going to have to make a decision on whether she races on into next year or whether that will be enough. Both owners are breeders as well and like to breed out of lightly raced mares essentially. At the moment she’s only had 10 starts," John Messara said.

After two trials in August, Shoals returned for a third in the McEwen Stakes. On September 29, she finished 2nd in the Premiere Stakes behind Santa Ana Lane, who set a new track record for the Randwick 1200 metres. She then came second-last in The Everest.

Shoals returned after a five month spell in the Canterbury Stakes on 9 March 2019, finishing second behind Trapeze Artist. She was then entered in the Group 1 William Reid Stakes. Freedman said, "Her next couple of runs are likely to be in Sydney but that will be up to the weather. She has won on the heavy in her early days but she didn't handle it in The Everest. She's going to stud this year so she won't have too many more runs." She was scratched the day before the race, with the stable saying she had a bruised foot.

Shoals last race was the TJ Smith Stakes on 6 April, where she finished eighth. Freedman said, "She pulled up a little sore after the race. She is better this morning escaping serious injury, but in any case she's retired now and has run her last race for us. She has been a wonderful mare for the stable and a privilege to train. She has nothing left to prove on the track and with her pedigree, she is a very valuable broodmare."

Her first foal, a filly named Isthmus, sired by I Am Invincible, ran her first race at Flemington in May 2023.
