= Light Fingers Stakes =

- Class: Group 2
- Location: Randwick Racecourse, Sydney, Australia
- Inaugurated: 1979
- Race type: Thoroughbred
- Sponsor: TAB (2017-2026)

Race information
- Distance: 1,200 metres
- Surface: Turf
- Qualification: Three year old fillies
- Weight: Set weights (56 kg)
- Purse: $300,000 (2026)

The Light Fingers Stakes is an Australian Turf Club Group 2 Thoroughbred horse race, for three-year-old fillies at set weights, over a distance of 1200 metres at Randwick Racecourse in Sydney, Australia every February.

== History ==
The race is named in honour of the 1965 Melbourne Cup and dual Oaks winner Light Fingers.

=== Grade ===
- 1983–1985 - Listed Race
- 1986 - Group 2
- 1987–1990 - Group 3
- 1991 onwards - Group 2

=== Distance ===
- 1979–1996 – 1200 metres
- 1997–1998 – 1100 metres
- 1999–2003 – 1200 metres
- 2004 – 1180 metres
- 2005 onwards - 1200 metres

=== Venue ===
- 1979–2001 - Randwick Racecourse
- 2002 - Warwick Farm Racecourse
- 2003–2011 - Randwick Racecourse
- 2012 - Warwick Farm Racecourse
- 2013 - Rosehill Gardens Racecourse
- 2014 onwards - Randwick Racecourse

== Winners ==
The following are winners of the race.

- 2026 - Savvy Hallie
- 2025 - Lady Shenandoah
- 2024 - Kimochi
- 2023 - In Secret
- 2022 - Fangirl
- 2021 - Every Rose
- 2020 - Flit
- 2019 - Nakeeta Jane
- 2018 - Alizee
- 2017 - Global Glamour
- 2016 - Perignon
- 2015 - Adrift
- 2014 - Sweet Idea
- 2013 - Bennetta
- 2012 - Sea Siren
- 2011 - Obsequious
- 2010 - More Joyous
- 2009 - Rock Me Baby
- 2008 - Forensics
- 2007 - Gold Edition
- 2006 - Street Smart
- 2005 - Trezevant
- 2004 - Sharp
- 2003 - Only Glory
- 2002 - Ancient Song
- 2001 - Lady Mulan
- 2000 - Camena
- 1999 - Rubicall
- 1998 - Staging
- 1997 - Assertive Lass
- 1996 - Peruzzi
- 1995 - Flight To Fantasy
- 1994 - Gem Of The West
- 1993 - Skating
- 1992 - Office
- 1991 - Whisked
- 1990 - Joanne
- 1989 - Paris Miss
- 1988 - Here's The Point
- 1987 - Magic Flute
- 1986 - Shinakima
- 1985 - Rivage
- 1984 - Sabre Dancer
- 1983 - Emancipation
- 1982 - Playing Our Song
- 1981 - Shaybisc

== See also ==
- List of Australian Group races
- Group races
