= Alizee (horse) =

Australian thoroughbred racehorse

- Racing silks of Godolphin
- Sire: Sepoy (AUS)
- Grandsire: Elusive Quality (USA)
- Dam: Essaouira (AUS)
- Damsire: Exceed And Excel (AUS)
- Sex: Mare
- Foaled: 2014
- Country: Australia
- Colour: Bay
- Breeder: Darley Stud
- Owner: Godolphin
- Trainer: John O'Shea (2017); James Cummings (2017–2020)
- Record: 29: 10–3–3
- Earnings: A$3,179,800

Major wins
- Tea Rose Stakes (2017); Flight Stakes (2017); Light Fingers Stakes (2018); Queen of the Turf Stakes (2018); Expressway Stakes (2019); Futurity Stakes (2019); Missile Stakes (2019); Apollo Stakes (2020)

Alizee (foaled 26 September 2014) is a retired multiple Group 1 winning Australian thoroughbred racehorse.

== Background ==
Alizee is a half sister to four times stakes winner, Astern, whose main success was the Group 1 Golden Rose Stakes in 2016.

== Racing career ==
Alizee won three Group 1 races in her career, the Flight Stakes, Queen of the Turf Stakes and the Futurity Stakes.

== Breeding career ==
Alizee gave birth to her first foal, a filly out of stallion I Am Invincible in 2021.

== Pedigree ==
Pedigree of Alizee (AUS) 2014
Sire Sepoy (AUS) 2008	Elusive Quality (USA); 1993	Gone West (USA); 1984	Mr Prospector (USA); 1970
Sire Sepoy (AUS) 2008	Elusive Quality (USA); 1993	Gone West (USA); 1984	Secrettame (USA); 1978
Sire Sepoy (AUS) 2008	Elusive Quality (USA); 1993	Touch of Greatness (USA); 1986	Hero's Honor (USA); 1980
Sire Sepoy (AUS) 2008	Elusive Quality (USA); 1993	Touch of Greatness (USA); 1986	Ivory Wand (USA); 1973
Sire Sepoy (AUS) 2008	Watchful (AUS); 2001	Danehill (USA); 1986	Danzig (USA); 1977
Sire Sepoy (AUS) 2008	Watchful (AUS); 2001	Danehill (USA); 1986	Razyana (USA); 1981
Sire Sepoy (AUS) 2008	Watchful (AUS); 2001	Canny Miss (AUS); 1991	Marscay (AUS); 1979
Sire Sepoy (AUS) 2008	Watchful (AUS); 2001	Canny Miss (AUS); 1991	Jesmond Lass (AUS); 1976
Dam Essaouira (AUS) 2006	Exceed And Excel (AUS); 2000	Danehill (USA); 1986	Danzig (USA); 1977
Dam Essaouira (AUS) 2006	Exceed And Excel (AUS); 2000	Danehill (USA); 1986	Razyana (USA); 1981
Dam Essaouira (AUS) 2006	Exceed And Excel (AUS); 2000	Patrona (USA); 1994	Lomond (USA); 1980
Dam Essaouira (AUS) 2006	Exceed And Excel (AUS); 2000	Patrona (USA); 1994	Gladiolus (USA); 1974
Dam Essaouira (AUS) 2006	Alizes (NZ); 2001	Rory's Jester (AUS); 1982	Crown Jester (AUS); 1978
Dam Essaouira (AUS) 2006	Alizes (NZ); 2001	Rory's Jester (AUS); 1982	Rory's Rocket (ENG); 1973
Dam Essaouira (AUS) 2006	Alizes (NZ); 2001	La Baraka (AUS); 1994	Euclase (AUS); 1987
Dam Essaouira (AUS) 2006	Alizes (NZ); 2001	La Baraka (AUS); 1994	Triscay (AUS); 1987
