= Furious Stakes =

- Class: Group 2
- Location: Randwick Racecourse, Sydney, Australia
- Inaugurated: 1986
- Race type: Thoroughbred - flat
- Sponsor: Kia Ora Stud (2026)

Race information
- Distance: 1,200 metres
- Surface: Turf
- Track: Right-handed
- Qualification: Three year old fillies
- Weight: Set weights
- Purse: A$300,000 (2026)

The Furious Stakes is a City Tattersalls Club Group 2 Thoroughbred horse race for three-year-old fillies, at set weights, over a distance of 1200 metres at Randwick Racecourse, Sydney, Australia in September.

== History ==
=== Grade ===
- 1986–1994 - Listed Race
- 1995–2004 - Group 3
- 2005 onwards - Group 2

=== Venue ===
- 1984–1999 - Randwick
- 2000 - Rosehill
- 2001–2003 - Randwick
- 2004 - Warwick Farm
- 2005–2010 - Randwick
- 2011–2012 - Warwick Farm
- 2013 onwards - Randwick

=== Distance ===
- 1986–1999 – 1400 metres
- 2000 – 1350 metres
- 2001–2012 – 1400 metres
- 2013 onwards - 1200 metres

== Winners ==
The following are past winners of the race.

- 2026 - Bangkok Hottie
- 2025 - Apocalyptic
- 2024 - Manaal
- 2023 - Tiz Incincible
- 2022 - North Star Lass
- 2021 - Jamaea
- 2020 - Dame Giselle
- 2019 - Libertini
- 2018 - Pure Elation
- 2017 - Formality
- 2016 - Foxplay
- 2015 - Speak Fondly
- 2014 - Winx
- 2013 - Bound For Earth
- 2012 - Dear Demi
- 2011 - Streama
- 2010 - More Strawberries
- 2009 - Melito
- 2008 - Samantha Miss
- 2007 - †race not held
- 2006 - Just Dancing
- 2005 - Mnemosyne
- 2004 - Prisoner Of Love
- 2003 - Shamekha
- 2002 - Victory Vein
- 2001 - Moonflute
- 2000 - Unworldly
- 1999 - Danglissa
- 1998 - Sunline
- 1997 - Stella Cadente
- 1996 - Dashing Eagle
- 1995 - Seattle Gem
- 1994 - Danarani
- 1993 - Angst
- 1992 - Yodelay
- 1991 - Bold Promise
- 1990 - Twiglet
- 1989 - Tristanagh
- 1988 - Research
- 1987 - Glory Girl
- 1986 - La Cadeau

† Not held because of outbreak of equine influenza

== See also ==
- Chelmsford Stakes
- Concorde Stakes (Australia)
- Tramway Stakes
- List of Australian Group races
- Group races
