= Flight Stakes =

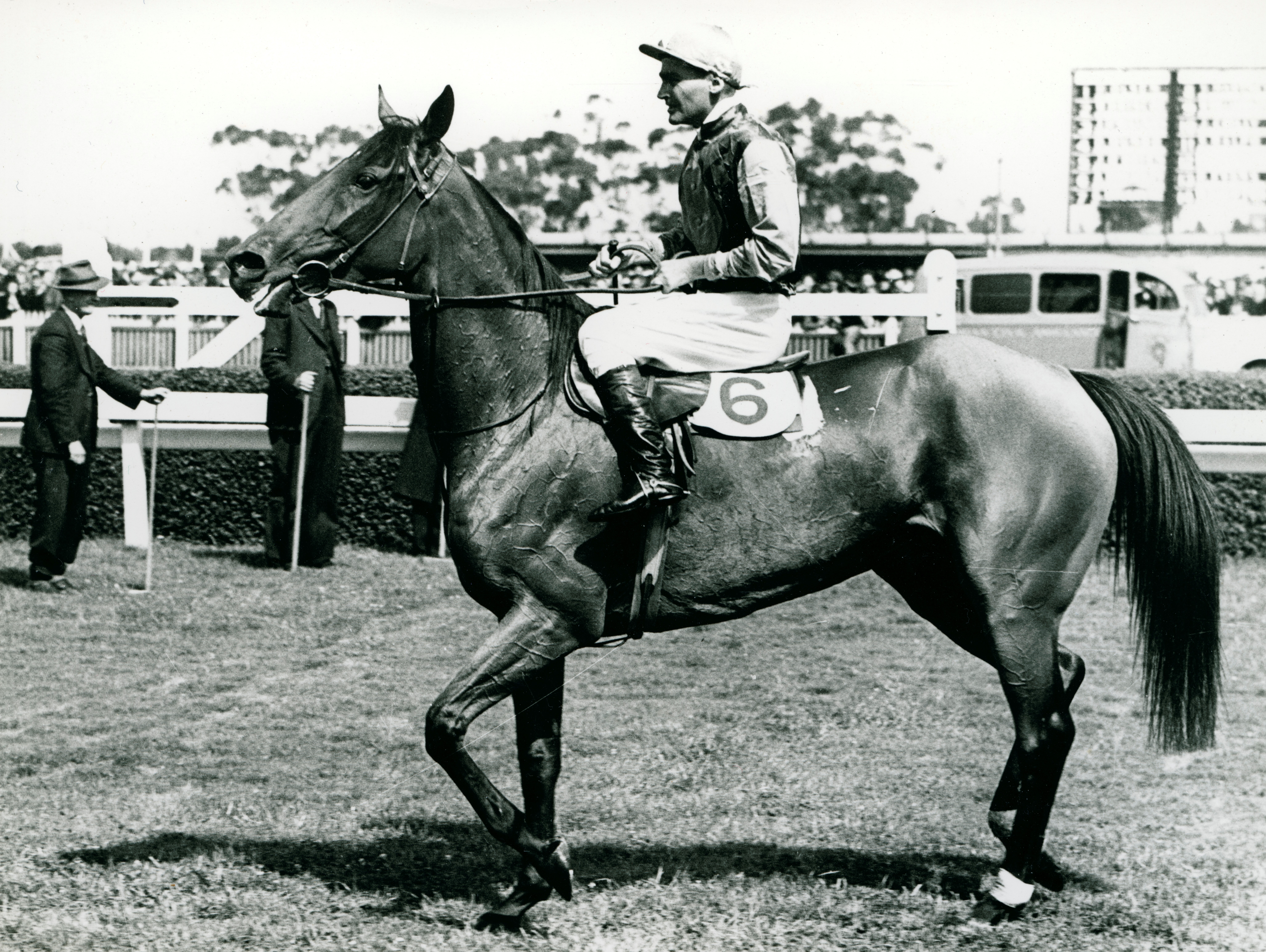
- Flight, and Jack O'Sullivan.
- Class: Group 1
- Location: Randwick Racecourse, Sydney, Australia
- Inaugurated: 1947
- Race type: Thoroughbred - flat
- Sponsor: Darley (2026)

Race information
- Distance: 1,600 metres
- Surface: Turf
- Track: Right-handed
- Qualification: Three year old fillies
- Weight: Set weights – 56 kg
- Purse: A$750,000 (2026)
- Bonuses: Winner exemption from a ballot on the Doncaster Mile

The Flight Stakes is an Australian Turf Club Group 1 Thoroughbred horse race for three-year-old fillies, at Set Weights, run over a distance of 1600 metres at Randwick Racecourse, Sydney, Australia in early October.

== History ==
The race is named for champion Australian Hall of Fame mare Flight, the winner of the W. S. Cox Plate in 1945 and 1946. The race is part of the Epsom Handicap racecard.

Flight, and Jack Thompson

=== Grade ===
- 1947–1978 - Principal Race
- 1979–1984 - Group 2
- 1985 onwards - Group 1

=== Distance ===
- 1947–1971 - 1 mile (~1600 metres)
- 1972 onwards - 1600 metres

=== Venue ===
- 1947–1982 - Randwick Racecourse
- 1983 - Warwick Farm Racecourse
- 1984–2000 - Randwick Racecourse
- 2001 - Warwick Farm Racecourse
- 2012 onwards - Randwick Racecourse

== Winners ==
The following are past winners of the race.

- 2026 - Global Goal
- 2025 - Apocalyptic
- 2024 - Lady Shenandoah
- 2023 - Tropical Squall
- 2022 - Zougotcha
- 2021 - Never Been Kissed
- 2020 - Montefilia
- 2019 - Funstar
- 2018 - Oohood
- 2017 - Alizee
- 2016 - Global Glamour
- 2015 - Speak Fondly
- 2014 - First Seal
- 2013 - Guelph
- 2012 - Norzita
- 2011 - Streama
- 2010 - Secret Admirer
- 2009 - More Joyous
- 2008 - Samantha Miss
- 2007 - ‡race not held
- 2006 - Cheeky Choice
- 2005 - Fashions Afield
- 2004 - Lotteria
- 2003 - Unearthly
- 2002 - Royal Purler
- 2001 - Ha Ha
- 2000 - Unworldly
- 1999 - Danglissa
- 1998 - Sunline
- 1997 - Only A Lady
- 1996 - †Assertive Lass / Dashing Eagle
- 1995 - Pontal Lass
- 1994 - Danarani
- 1993 - Angst
- 1992 - Slight Chance
- 1991 - Electrique
- 1990 - Triscay
- 1989 - A Little Kiss
- 1988 - Research
- 1987 - Judyann
- 1986 - Bounding Away
- 1985 - Tingo Tango
- 1984 - Goleen
- 1983 - La Caissiere
- 1982 - Gelsomino
- 1981 - Allez Show
- 1980 - Fiancee
- 1979 - Snowing
- 1978 - Jubilee Walk
- 1977 - Sun Sally
- 1976 - Apollua
- 1975 - Gloomy Isle
- 1974 - Cap D'Antibes
- 1973 - Better Comment
- 1972 - Siduri
- 1971 - Better Gleam
- 1970 - Tropic Jewel
- 1969 - Natal Lass
- 1968 - Flying Fable
- 1967 - Flying Gauntlet
- 1966 - Candy Floss
- 1965 - Fawnia
- 1964 - Reveille
- 1963 - Slepsie
- 1962 - Jan's Image
- 1961 - Hoa Hine
- 1960 - Wenona Girl
- 1959 - Weeamera
- 1958 - Straightlaced
- 1957 - Amneris
- 1956 - French Fable
- 1955 - Brimses
- 1954 - Travel Free
- 1953 - Redeswood
- 1952 - Bush Chapel
- 1951 - Blue's Sister
- 1950 - Putoko
- 1949 - Mona's Choice
- 1948 - Wattle
- 1947 - Nizam's Ring

† Dead heat
‡ Not held because of outbreak of equine influenza
