= Sydney Carnival =

Australian horse racing series

The Sydney Carnival, also known as the Sydney Autumn Carnival, is a major Australian Thoroughbred racing series held in Sydney in March and April each year. It consists of six weeks of racing conducted by Australian Turf Club across the city's two primary racecourses: Royal Randwick and Rosehill Gardens. The most important races include the AAMI Golden Slipper Stakes, the world's richest race for two-year-old horses, the BMW Stakes, the Rosehill Guineas, the Australian Derby, the Doncaster Handicap and the Sydney Cup. The 2015 Sydney Autumn Carnival consists of 20 Group 1 races, and offers $26.5 million in prize money.

== New Format - "The Championships" ==
Inaugurated in 2014 and dubbed "The Grand Finals of Australian Racing", The Championships is held on two days over the Easter Holiday period. The Championships have combined previous stand alone races such as the Doncaster Mile, The Australian Derby, the Queen Elizabeth Stakes and The Sydney Cup into two weekends of racing with nearly $10 million prize money on offer each Saturday. The 2015 Championships will be hosted at Royal Randwick, known as the home of Thoroughbred racing in Sydney. Racing days are 4 and 11 April 2015.

The Championships is attempting to attract global interest in Sydney Racing, and in 2015 six international horses will be participating. The Canterbury racetrack, after being granted federal government approval, is to be used as a quarantine training and stabling area for overseas horses.

In 2014, The Queen Elizabeth Stakes prize money was raised to $4 million, becoming the richest race of the Sydney Autumn Carnival. Another iconic race is the Doncaster Mile, which offers $3 million in prize money.
