= Missile Stakes =

- Class: Group 2
- Location: Randwick Racecourse, Sydney, Australia
- Inaugurated: 1978
- Race type: Thoroughbred - flat
- Sponsor: Kia Ora Stud (2026)

Race information
- Distance: 1,200 metres
- Surface: Turf
- Track: Right-handed
- Qualification: Three year olds and older
- Weight: Set Weights and penalties (2020 onwards), Weight for Age (to 2019
- Purse: A$300,000 (2026)

The Missile Stakes is an Australian Turf Club Group 2 Thoroughbred horse race for three year olds and older run at Weight for Age over a distance of 1200 metres at Randwick Racecourse, Sydney, Australia in August.

== History ==
The race was first run in 1978. The event is the first Group race in the new racing calendar in New South Wales.

Outsiders to have won the race include Plus Vite at 100-1 in 1984 and Hard Empire at 70-1 in 2022.

In 2020 the race changed from WFA to Set weights and penalties.

=== Grade ===
- 1978–1979 - Principal Race
- 1980–2013 - Group 3
- 2014 onwards - Group 2

=== Venue ===
- 1978–2011 - Rosehill
- 2012 - Warwick Farm
- 2013 - Randwick
- 2019 - Rosehill
- 2021 - Randwick
- 2022 - Randwick

=== Distance ===
- 1978–2009 - 1100 metres
- 2010 onwards - 1200 metres

== Winners ==
The following are winners of the race.

- 2026 - Ninja
- 2025 - ‡race not held
- 2024 - Schwarz
- 2023 - I Am Me
- 2022 - Hard Empire
- 2021 - Phobetor
- 2020 - Eduardo
- 2019 - Alizee
- 2018 - Pierata
- 2017 - Invincible Gem
- 2016 - Tycoon Tara
- 2015 - Burbero
- 2014 - Sweet Idea
- 2013 - Rain Affair
- 2012 - Pinwheel
- 2011 - Rain Affair
- 2010 - Love Conquers All
- 2009 - Teasing
- 2008 - Captain Bax
- 2007 - German Chocolate
- 2006 - Imprisoned
- 2005 - Dance Hero
- 2004 - Spark Of Life
- 2003 - Pompeii
- 2002 - Lonhro
- 2001 - Sportsbrat
- 2000 - Padstow
- 1999 - Commands
- 1998 - Mr. Victory
- 1997 - Guineas
- 1996 - Legal Agent
- 1995 - Brawny Spirit
- 1994 - Klokka
- 1993 - Klokka
- 1992 - Joanne
- 1991 - Joanne
- 1990 - Potrero
- 1989 - Select Prince
- 1988 - Campaign King
- 1987 - Campaign King
- 1986 - Shankhill Lass
- 1985 - Row Of Waves
- 1984 - Plus Vite
- 1983 - Young Blood
- 1982 - Nordic Prince
- 1982 - Razor Sharp
- 1981 - race not held
- 1980 - Macho
- 1979 - Salaam
- 1978 - Idol

== See also ==
- List of Australian Group races
- Group races
