= Carbine Club Stakes =

Carbine Club Stakes may refer to:

- Carbine Club Stakes (ATC), an Australian Turf Club horse race
- Carbine Club Stakes (VRC), a Victoria Racing Club horse race
