= TJ Smith Stakes =

- Class: Group 1
- Location: Randwick Racecourse, Sydney, Australia
- Inaugurated: 1997 as Endeavour Stakes
- Race type: Thoroughbred - flat
- Sponsor: Asahi Super Dry (2025 & 2026)

Race information
- Distance: 1,200 metres
- Surface: Turf
- Track: Right-handed
- Weight: Weight for Age
- Purse: A$3,000,000 (2026)
- Bonuses: Exempt from ballot in Breeders' Cup Turf Sprint

The TJ Smith Stakes is an Australian Turf Club Group 1 Thoroughbred horse race at Weight for Age run over a distance of 1200 metres at Randwick Racecourse, Sydney, Australia in the autumn during the ATC Championships series.

== History ==
The inaugural race in 1997 was known as the Endeavour Stakes. In 1999 the race was renamed in honour of the trainer Thomas John Smith, who won 33 racing titles in Sydney.

The race has risen in prestige due to the stakes offered. In recent years it has attracted high calibre sprinters such as Black Caviar and Takeover Target who have gone on to win overseas.

=== Grade ===
- 1997 - Listed Race
- 1998–2001 - Group 3
- 2002–2004 - Group 2
- 2005 - Group 1

== Winners ==
The following are past winners of the race.

- 2026 - Joliestar
- 2025 - Briasa
- 2024 - Chain Of Lightning
- 2023 - I Wish I Win
- 2022 - Nature Strip
- 2021 - Nature Strip
- 2020 - Nature Strip
- 2019 - Santa Ana Lane
- 2018 - Trapeze Artist
- 2017 - Chautauqua
- 2016 - Chautauqua
- 2015^{(1)} - Chautauqua
- 2014 - Lankan Rupee
- 2013 - Black Caviar
- 2012 - Master Of Design
- 2011 - Black Caviar
- 2010 - Melito
- 2009 - Takeover Target
- 2008 - Apache Cat
- 2007 - Bentley Biscuit
- 2006 - Red Oog
- 2005 - Shamekha
- 2004 - Dilly Dally
- 2003 - Spinning Hill
- 2002 - Phoenix Park
- 2001 - Century Kid
- 2000 - Shy Hero
- 1999 - Ab Initio
- 1998 - La Baraka
- 1997 - Mahogany

Notes:

- ^(1) Date of race rescheduled due to postponement of the Easter Saturday meeting because of the heavy track conditions. The meeting was moved to Easter Monday, 6 April 2015.

== See also ==
- Adrian Knox Stakes
- Australian Derby
- Carbine Club Stakes (ATC)
- Chairman's Quality
- Doncaster Mile
- Inglis Sires
- Kindergarten Stakes
- P J Bell Stakes
- List of Australian Group races
- Group races
