= Chairman's Quality (ATC) =

Horse race in Sydney, Australia

Chairman's Handicap
- Class: Group 2
- Location: Randwick Racecourse; Sydney, New South Wales
- Inaugurated: 1979
- Race type: Thoroughbred – Flat racing
- Sponsor: Schweppes (2011-26)

Race information
- Distance: 2,600 metres
- Surface: Turf
- Track: Right-handed
- Qualification: Three years old and older
- Weight: Quality Handicap
- Purse: $300,000 (2026)
- Bonuses: Exempt from ballot and penalty for Sydney Cup

The Chairman's Quality also known as the Chairman's Handicap is an Australian Turf Club Group 2 Thoroughbred quality handicap horse race for horses three years old and older, held over a distance of 2600 metres at Randwick Racecourse, Sydney, Australia, in April. The winner of this race is exempt from ballot and penalty in weights for the ATC Sydney Cup.

== History ==
=== Name ===
- 1979–2011 - Chairman's Handicap
- 2012–2013 - Chairman's Quality
- 2014–2017 - Chairman's Handicap
- 2018 onwards - Chairman's Quality

=== Grade ===
- 1979–2001 - Group 3
- 2002 onwards - Group 2

=== Distance ===
- 1979–1999 - 2600 metres
- 2000–2003 - 2400 metres
- 2004 onwards - 2600 metres

=== Chairman's Handicap - Sydney Cup ===
The race is traditionally a lead up for the Sydney Cup which is run one week later. The following horses have won the Chairman's Handicap - Sydney Cup double in the same year:

- 1986 - Marooned
- 1987 - Major Drive
- 1990 - King Aussie
- 1997 - Linesman
- 2002 - Henderson Bay
- 2008 - No Wine No Song
- 2010 - Jessicabeel
- 2014 - The Offer
- 2024 - Circle Of Fire

== Winners ==
Past winners of the race are as follows.

- 2026 - Newlook
- 2025 - Alalcance
- 2024 - Circle Of Fire
- 2023 - Surefire
- 2022 - Nerve Not Verve
- 2021 - Quick Thinker
- 2020 - Raheen House
- 2019 - Gallic Chieftain
- 2018 - Sir Charles Road
- 2017 - Big Duke
- 2016 - Libran
- 2015^{(1)} - Tremec
- 2014 - The Offer
- 2013 - Tremec
- 2012 - Permit
- 2011 - Once Were Wild
- 2010 - Jessicabeel
- 2009 - Divine Rebel
- 2008 - No Wine No Song
- 2007 - No Wine No Song
- 2006 - Fooram
- 2005 - Philosophe
- 2004 - Mummify
- 2003 - Grey Song
- 2002 - Henderson Bay
- 2001 - Steel Phoenix
- 2000 - Pravda
- 1999 - Steel Phoenix
- 1998 - Joss Sticks
- 1997 - Linesman
- 1996 - Cornwall King
- 1995 - Spiritual Star
- 1994 - Paris Fire
- 1993 - Te Akau Nick
- 1992 - Demerit
- 1991 - Prizaan
- 1990 - King Aussie
- 1989 - Just Trish
- 1988 - Round The World
- 1987 - Major Drive
- 1986 - Marooned
- 1985 - Duanette's Girl
- 1984 - What A Nuisance
- 1983 - Lord Mop
- 1982 - Bianco Lady
- 1981 - Gatcombe
- 1980 - Just Jealous
- 1979 - Lady Dignitas

Notes:

- ^(1) Date of race rescheduled due to postponement of the Easter Saturday meeting because of the heavy track conditions. The meeting was moved to Easter Monday, 6 April 2015.

== See also ==
- Adrian Knox Stakes
- Australian Derby
- Carbine Club Stakes (ATC)
- Doncaster Mile
- Inglis Sires
- Kindergarten Stakes
- P J Bell Stakes
- T J Smith Stakes
- List of Australian Group races
- Group races
