= P J Bell Stakes =

- Class: Group 3
- Location: Randwick Racecourse, Sydney, Australia
- Inaugurated: 1985 (as Analie Handicap)
- Race type: Thoroughbred
- Sponsor: 4 Pines (2026)

Race information
- Distance: 1,200 metres
- Surface: Turf
- Track: Right-handed
- Qualification: Three-year-old fillies
- Weight: Set weights with penalties
- Purse: $250,000 (2026)

The P J Bell Stakes is an Australian Turf Club Group 3 Thoroughbred horse race for three-year-old fillies having set weights with penalties conditions, over a distance of 1200 metres, held annually at Randwick Racecourse in Sydney, Australia in the autumn during the ATC Championships series.

== History ==
The race was inaugurated in 1985 and was named after the Champion mare Analie, who won the 1973 Doncaster Handicap and AJC Oaks.

It was renamed in honour of the former Chairman of the Australian Turf Club, P J (Jim) Bell (1921–2006), who was chairman from November 1983 to 1992.

=== Name ===
- 1985–1994 - Analie Handicap
- 1995–2009 - P J Bell Handicap
- 2010 - McGrath Estate Stakes
- 2011 onwards - P J Bell Stakes

=== Grade ===
- 1985–2013 - Listed Race
- 2014 onwards - Group 3

=== Venue ===
- 2011–2013 - Canterbury Park Racecourse
- 2014 onwards - Randwick Racecourse

== Winners ==
The following are past winners of the race.

- 2026 - Plaintiff
- 2025 - She's Got Pizzazz
- 2024 - Facile
- 2023 - Magic Time
- 2022 - Heresy
- 2021 - Matchmaker
- 2020 - Rubisaki
- 2019 - Multaja
- 2018 - Houtzen
- 2017 - Diddums
- 2016 - Tempt Me Not
- 2015^{(1)} - Miss Cover Girl
- 2014 - Politeness
- 2013 - Catkins
- 2012 - Ever The Same
- 2011 - Red Tracer
- 2010 - Zingaling
- 2009 - Ortensia
- 2008 - Espurante
- 2007 - Hot 'n' Ready
- 2006 - Kakakakatie
- 2005 - Rich Megadale
- 2004 - Besame Mucho
- 2003 - Private Steer
- 2002 - Oomph
- 2001 - She's Purring
- 2000 - Mulan Princess
- 1999 - Wynciti
- 1998 - Flickering Fire
- 1997 - Dane Ripper
- 1996 - Presina
- 1995 - Verocative
- 1994 - Hot To Race
- 1993 - Snippet's Girl
- 1992 - Regina Madre
- 1991 - Peignoir
- 1990 - Reverse Pass
- 1989 - St. Bridget's Well
- 1988 - Bronze Empress
- 1987 - Winged Prayer
- 1986 - Sweet Dream Lady
- 1985 - Deal

Notes:

- ^(1) Date of race rescheduled due to postponement of the Easter Saturday meeting because of the heavy track conditions. The meeting was moved to Easter Monday, 6 April 2015.

== See also ==
- Adrian Knox Stakes
- Australian Derby
- Carbine Club Stakes (ATC)
- Chairman's Quality
- Doncaster Mile
- Inglis Sires
- Kindergarten Stakes
- T J Smith Stakes
- List of Australian Group races
- Group races
