= Adrian Knox Stakes =

Horse race held in Sydney, Australia

- Class: Group 3
- Location: Randwick Racecourse, Sydney, Australia
- Inaugurated: 1948 (as Princess Handicap)
- Race type: Thoroughbred
- Sponsor: TAB (2013-2026)

Race information
- Distance: 2,000 metres
- Surface: Turf
- Track: Right-handed
- Qualification: Three year old fillies
- Weight: Quality handicap - Minimum 54 kg
- Purse: $250,000 (2026)
- Bonuses: Exempt from a ballot Australian Oaks

The Adrian Knox Stakes is an Australian Turf Club Group 3 Thoroughbred quality handicap horse race for three-year-old fillies, over a distance of 2000 metres, held annually at Randwick Racecourse in Sydney, Australia, in April.

== History ==
The race is named in honour of Chief Justice of the High Court of Australia and former chairman of the Australian Jockey Club, Adrian Knox.

The event is a lead-up race to the Australian Oaks with the winner exempt from a ballot. The Australian Oaks was called the Australian Jockey Club Adrian Knox (Oaks) Stakes from 1922 to 1956.

=== Name ===
- 1948–1986 - Princess Handicap
- 1987 onwards - Adrian Knox Stakes

=== Distance ===
- 1948–1959 - 7 furlongs (~1400 m)
- 1960–1972 - 1 mile (~1600 m)
- 1973 onwards - 2000 metres

=== Grade ===
- 1948–1979 - Principal race
- 1980–1985 - Listed race
- 1986 onwards - Group 3

== Winners ==
Past winners of the race are as follows.

- 2026 - Profoundly
- 2025 - Belle Detelle
- 2024 - Good Banter
- 2023 - Arts
- 2022 - Honeycreeper
- 2021 - Duais
- 2020 - Colette
- 2019 - Aliferous
- 2018 - Luvaluva
- 2017 - Waking Moment
- 2016 - Diamond Made
- 2015^{(1)} - Candelara
- 2014 - Arabian Gold
- 2013 - Royal Descent
- 2012 - Full Of Spirit
- 2011 - Crafty Irna
- 2010 - Speedy Natalie
- 2009 - Miss Darcey
- 2008 - Raise
- 2007 - Rena's Lady
- 2006 - Operetta Lass
- 2005 - Don't Tell Clang
- 2004 - Wild Iris
- 2003 - Crianca
- 2002 - Republic Lass
- 2001 - Lady Mulan
- 2000 - Dottoressa
- 1999 - Starry Way
- 1998 - Star Alight
- 1997 - Sybeel
- 1996 - Eureka Jewel
- 1995 - Circles Of Gold
- 1994 - Seto Flowerian
- 1993 - Lady Agnes
- 1992 - Alma Mater
- 1991 - Lee's Bid
- 1990 - Dual Treasures
- 1989 - Chaleyer
- 1988 - Lady Liberty
- 1987 - Adraanette
- 1986 - Just Now
- 1985 - Our Sophia
- 1984 - String Of Pearls
- 1983 - Starzaan
- 1982 - Queen's Road
- 1981 - Market
- 1980 - Starshine Girl
- 1979 - Love's Delight
- 1978 - Nobbidge
- 1977 - Of Two Cities
- 1976 - Calera
- 1975 - La Grisette
- 1974 - Leilani
- 1973 - Cowper Queen
- 1972 - Better Gleam
- 1971 - Sparkling Red
- 1970 - Affectionate
- 1969 - With Respect
- 1968 - Lowland
- 1967 - Sialia
- 1966 - Bareme's Image
- 1965 - Light Fingers
- 1964 - Jane Hero
- 1963 - Fun For All
- 1962 - Fastest
- 1961 - Winnipeg
- 1960 - Waitful
- 1959 - Morning Gleam
- 1958 - Duchess Delville
- 1957 - New Amber
- 1956 - Franlyle
- 1955 - Sabah
- 1954 - Edelweiss
- 1953 - Tamuncha
- 1952 - Defame
- 1951 - Lady Rosetta
- 1950 - Lady Kristine
- 1949 - Persist
- 1948 - Respond

Notes:

- ^(1) Date of race rescheduled due to postponement of the Easter Saturday meeting because of the heavy track conditions. The meeting was moved to Easter Monday, 6 April 2015.

== See also ==
- Australian Derby
- Carbine Club Stakes (ATC)
- Chairman's Quality
- Doncaster Mile
- Inglis Sires
- Kindergarten Stakes
- P J Bell Stakes
- T J Smith Stakes
- Australian Oaks
- List of Australian Group races
- Group races
