= Doncaster Handicap =

Doncaster Mile registered as Doncaster Handicap
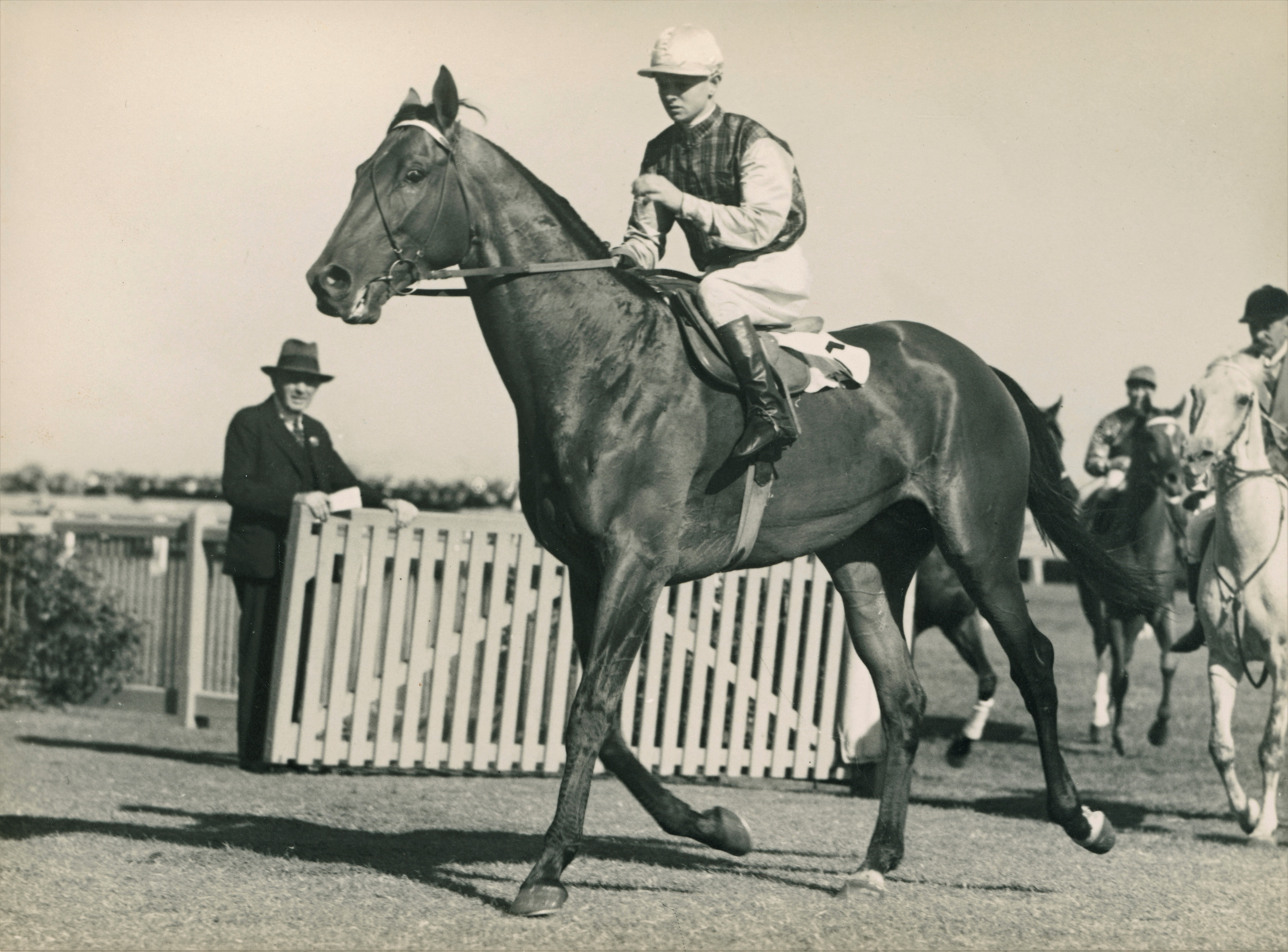
- Winooka, 1933 winner & Edgar Britt
- Class: Group I
- Location: Randwick Racecourse, Sydney, Australia
- Inaugurated: 1866
- Race type: Thoroughbred - Flat racing
- Sponsor: The Star (2014-25)
- Website: Australian Jockey Club

Race information
- Distance: 1,600 metres (~1 mile)
- Surface: Turf
- Track: Right-handed
- Qualification: Horses three years old and older
- Weight: Handicap, minimum 49 kg
- Purse: A$4,000,000 (2026)
- Bonuses: Exempt from ballot in Queen Elizabeth Stakes

The Doncaster Mile, registered as the Doncaster Handicap is an Australian Turf Club Group One Thoroughbred handicap race for horses three years old and older, held over 1,600 metres at Royal Randwick Racecourse, Sydney, Australia. Although the race has traditionally been held on Easter Monday, the race is now run on the first day of the ATC Championships Carnival at Royal Randwick.

== History ==
The inaugural running of the Doncaster Handicap in 1866. The 1892 running of the race attracted a record 30 starters. In 1930 the race was marred by a tragic fall 1 1/2 furlongs from the winning post when one of the favourites fell and another was destroyed.

Many great horses have won the race, including several who have also won the spring equivalent, the Epsom Handicap, while Super Impose created history in 1990 and 1991 by becoming the only horse to win both races on two occasions.

Legendary trainer T.J. Smith won the race seven times.

The record time for the race was set by Belmura Lad in 1979 with a time of 1:33.70. Beaten in 2018 by fan favourite Happy Clapper in 1.33.17.

In 2005 trainer Guy Walter trained the trifecta in this race with Patezza (1st), Courts In Session (2nd) and Danni Martine (3rd). It was the first time that this has been achieved.

== Distance ==
From 1879 to 1884 the distance of the race was 9 furlongs. The race name was changed in 2010 to the Doncaster Mile, although the race is not exactly 1 mile. That was the distance of the race before 1973 when the metric system was introduced in Australia.

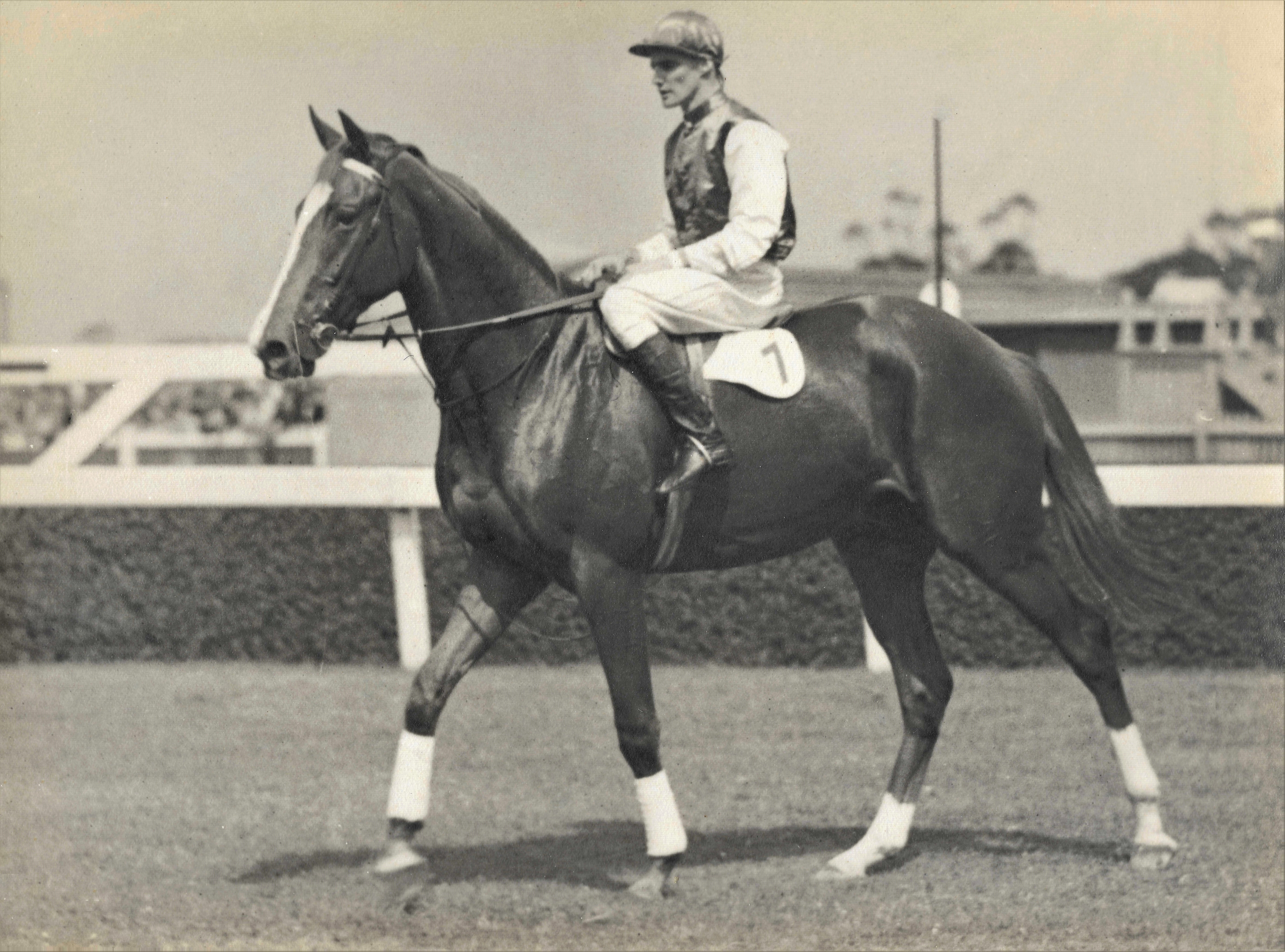
Gold Rod, 1939 winner

Chatham, 1934 winner

Fujisan, 1925 winner

== 1930 and 1932 racebooks ==
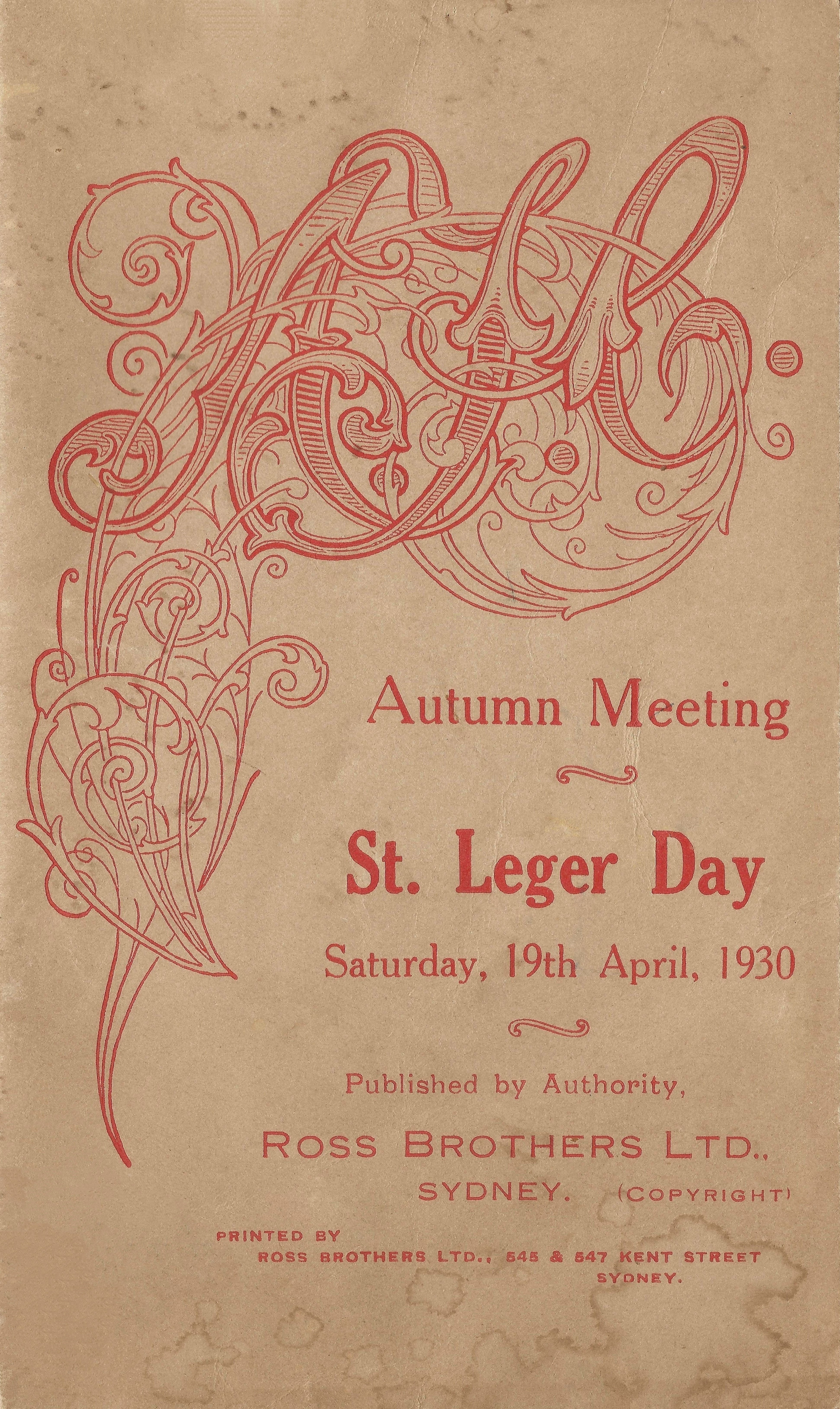
1930 AJC St Leger racebook front cover

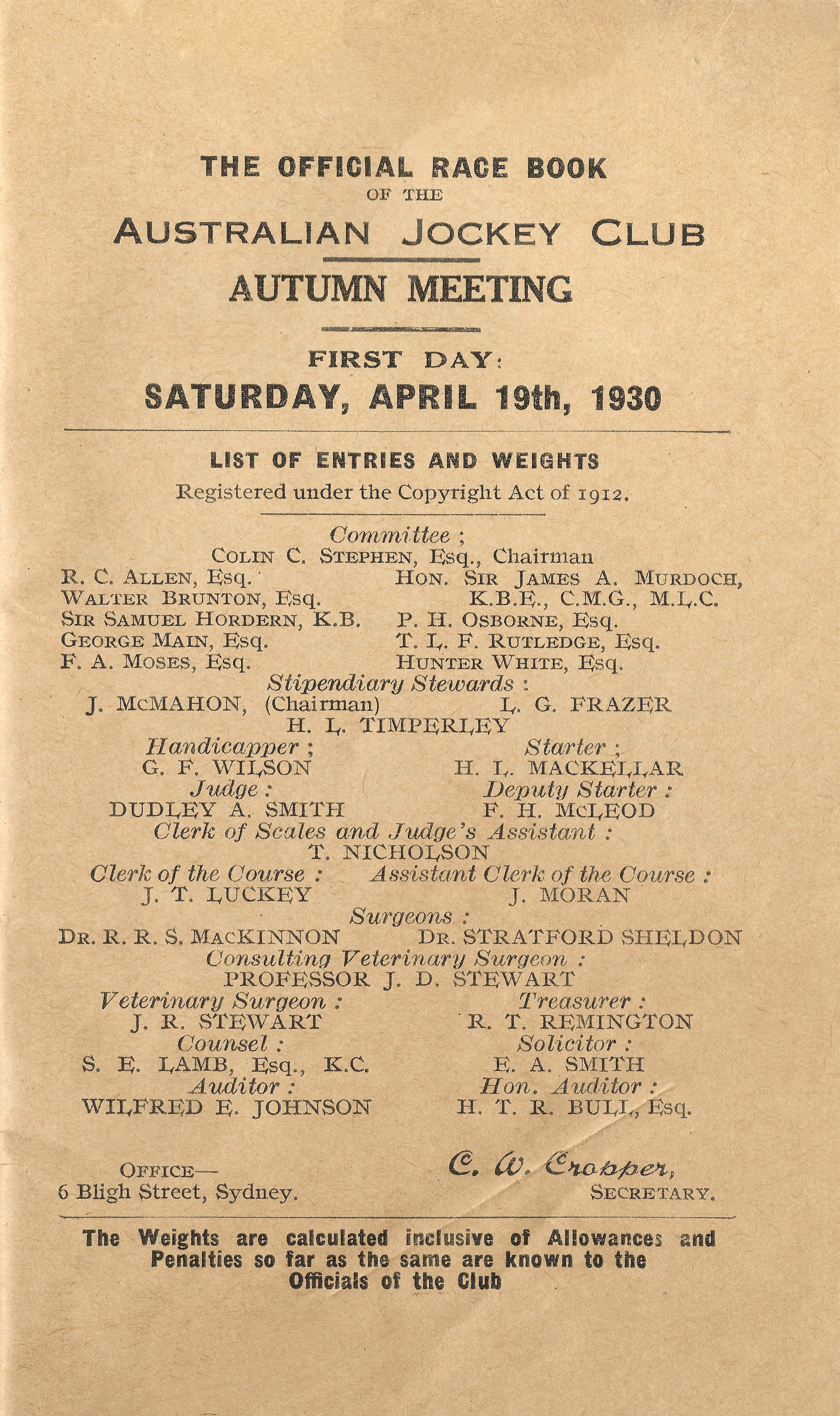
1930 AJC St Leger racebook showing raceday officials

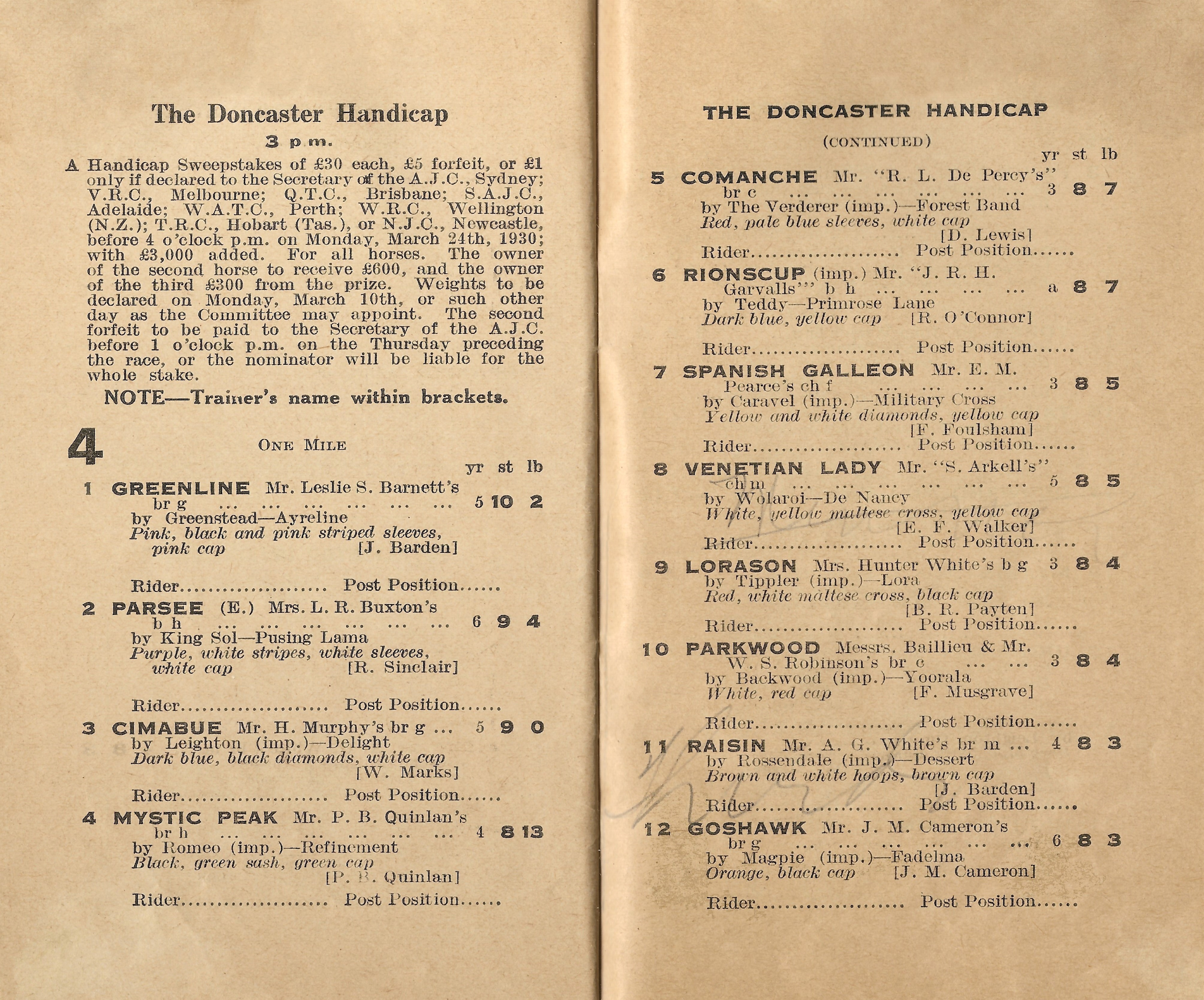
1930 AJC Doncaster Handicap showing the winner, Venetian Lady

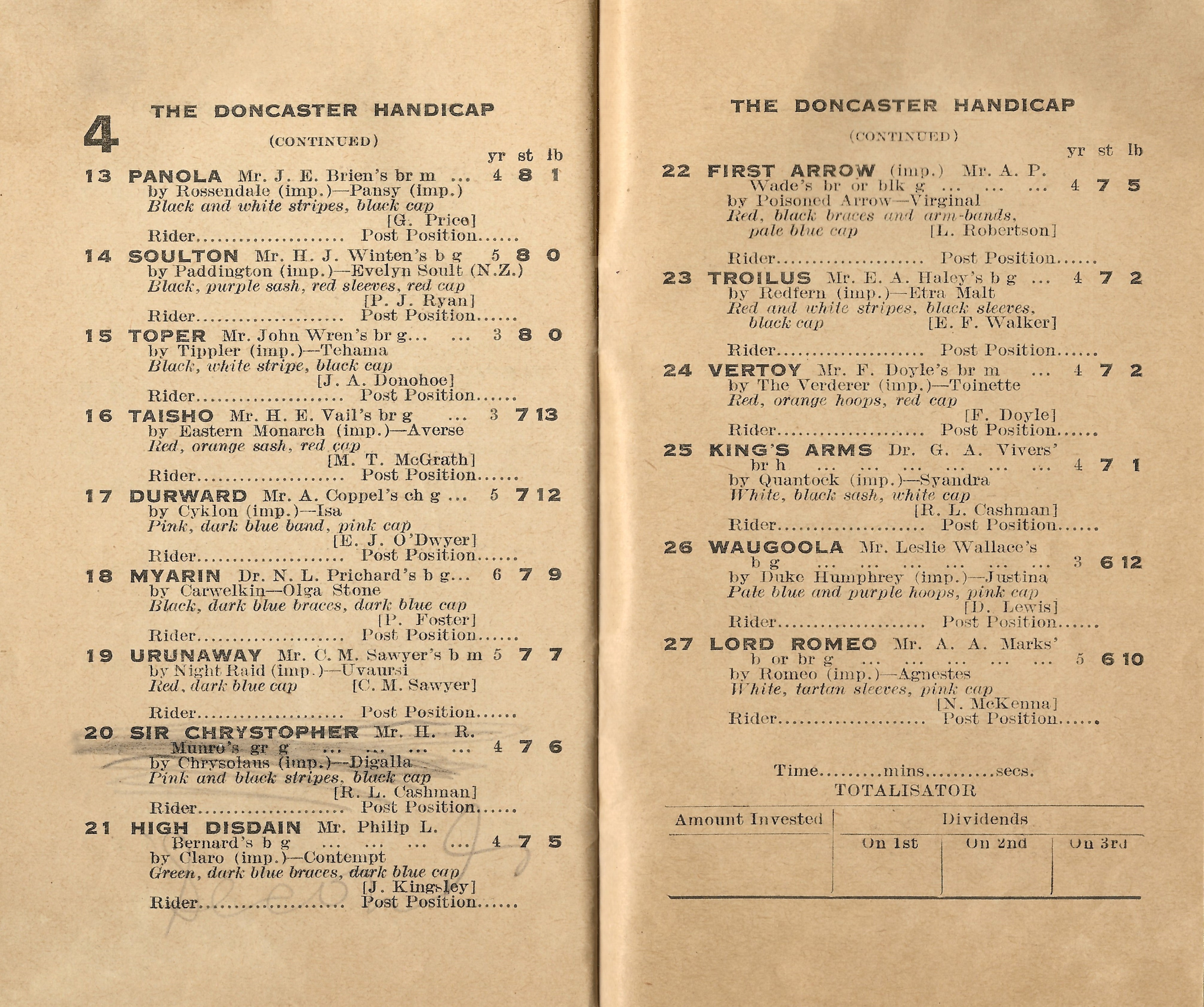
1930 AJC Doncaster Handicap page showing starters and results

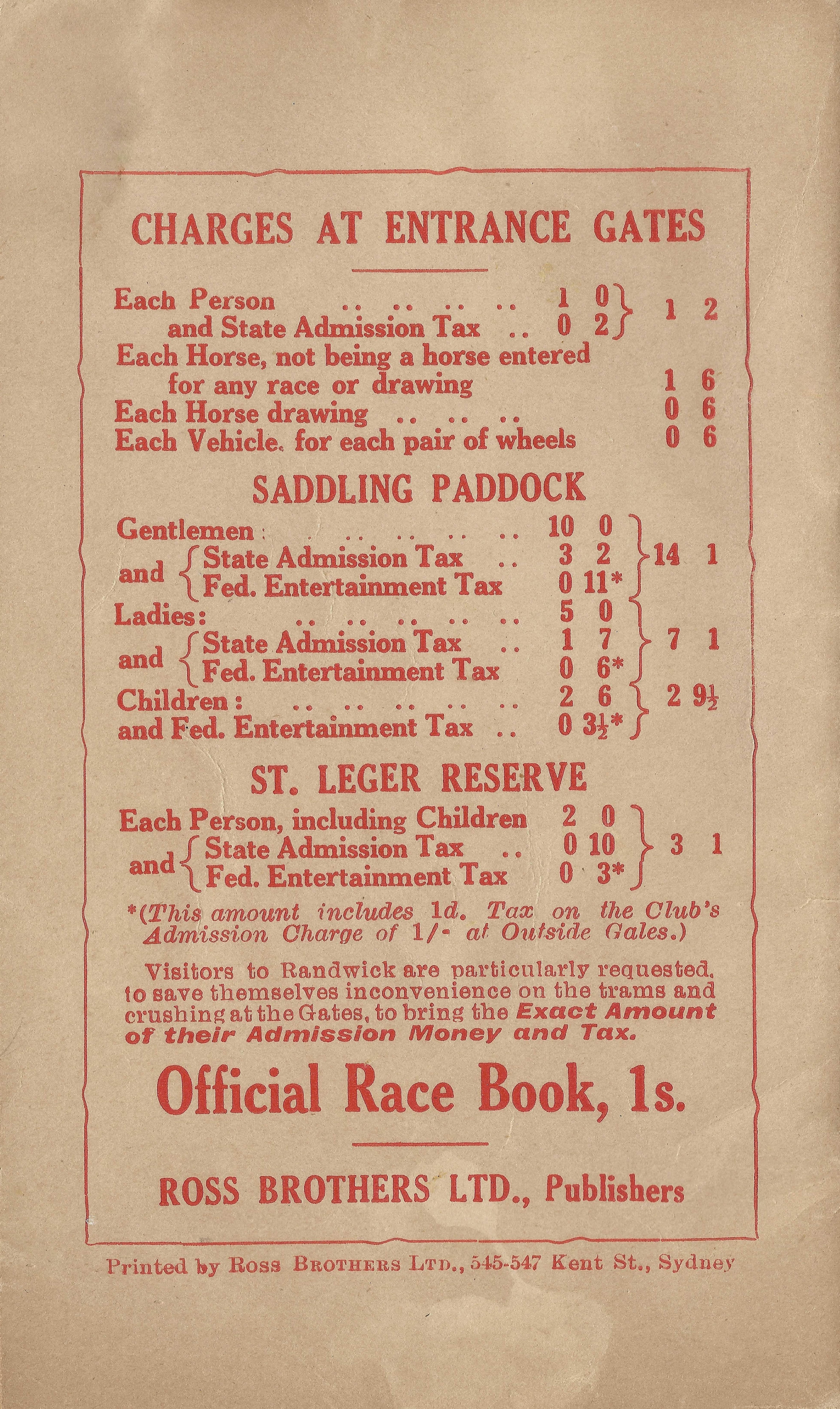
Back cover showing charges at the entrance gates

1932 AJC Doncaster Handicap page showing starters and results

1932 AJC Doncaster Handicap page showing starters and results

1932 AJC Doncaster Handicap page showing the winner, Jacko

== 1933 racebook ==
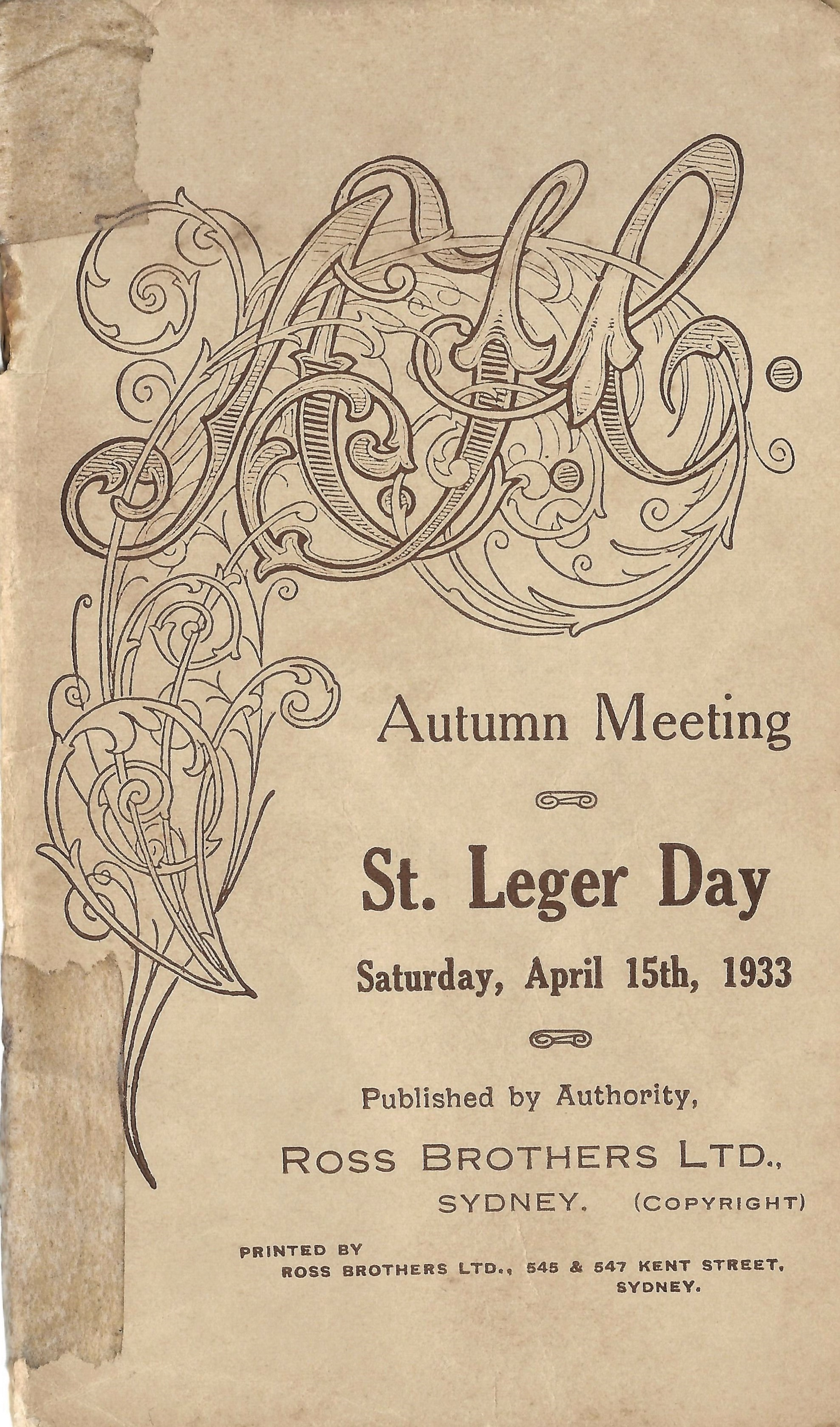
1933 AJC St Leger racebook front cover

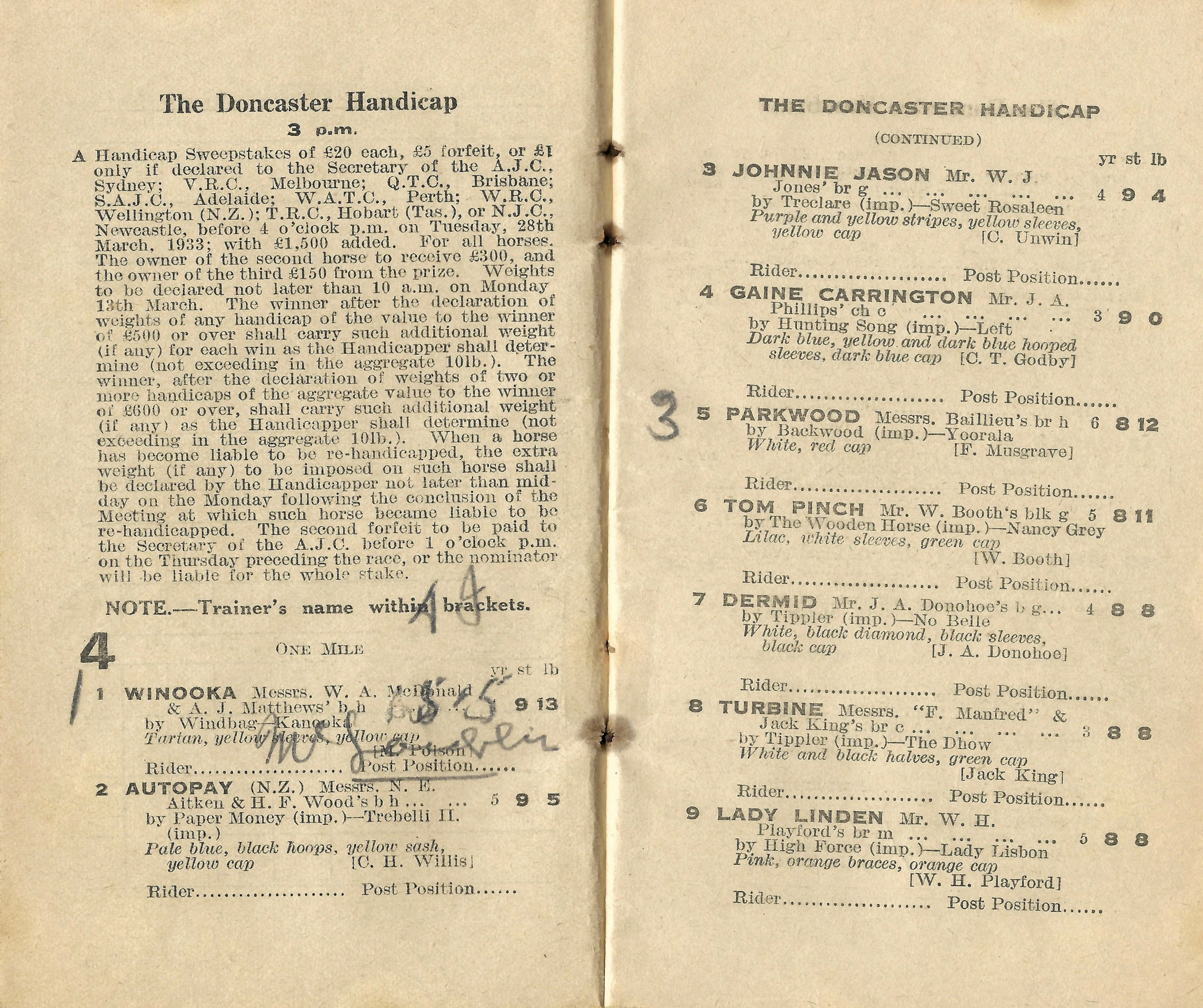
1933 AJC Doncaster Handicap page showing the winner, Winooka

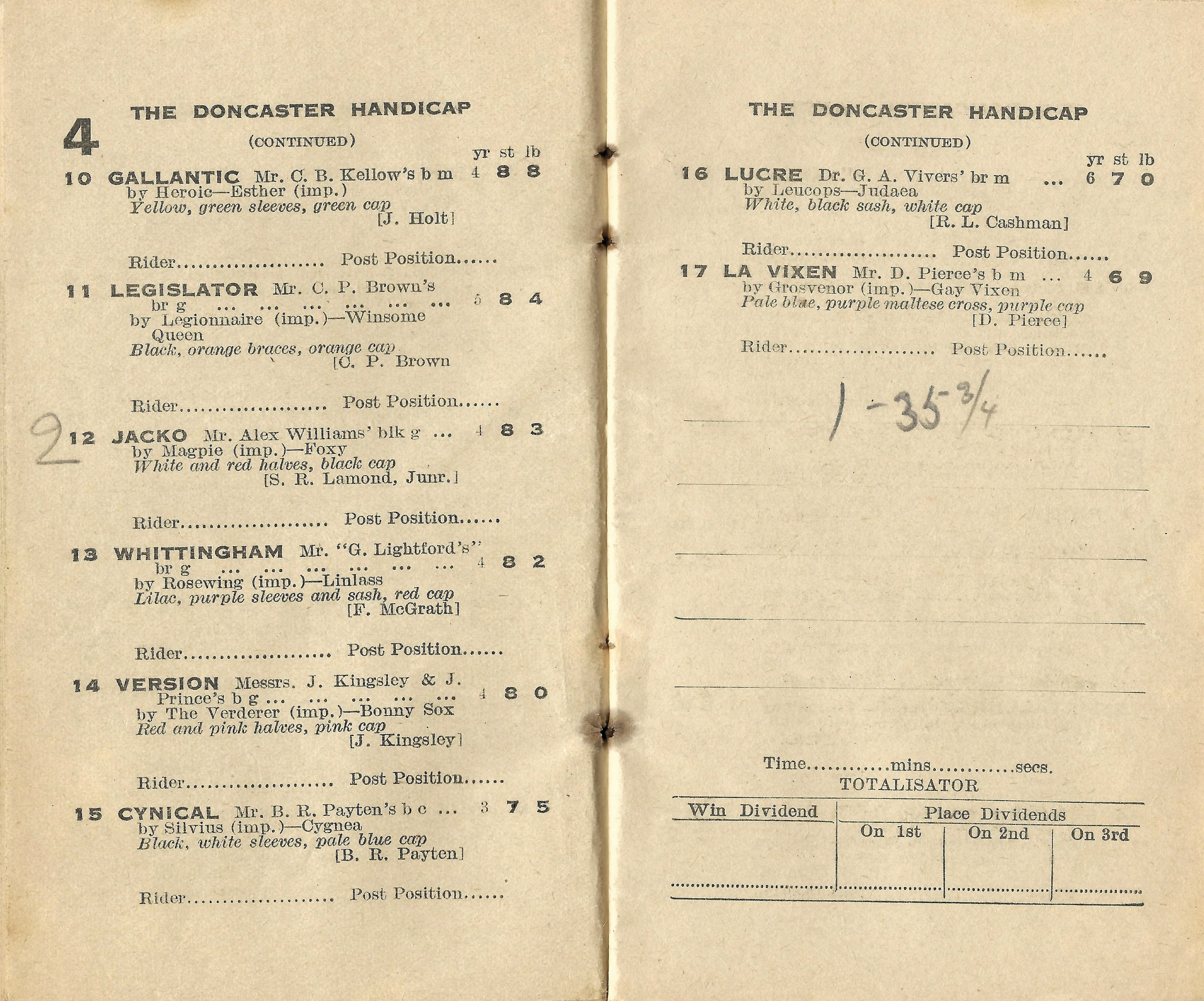
1933 AJC Doncaster Handicap starters and results

== Winners ==
The following are past winners of the race.

- 2026 - Sheza Alibi
- 2025 - Stefi Magnetica
- 2024 - Celestial Legend
- 2023 - Mr Brightside
- 2022 - Mr Brightside
- 2021 - Cascadian
- 2020 - Nettoyer
- 2019 - Brutal
- 2018 - Happy Clapper
- 2017 - It's Somewhat
- 2016 - Winx
- 2015^{(1)} - Kermadec
- 2014 - Sacred Falls
- 2013 - Sacred Falls
- 2012 - More Joyous
- 2011 - Sacred Choice
- 2010 - Rangirangdoo
- 2009 - Vision and Power
- 2008 - Triple Honour
- 2007 - Haradasun
- 2006 - Racing To Win
- 2005 - Patezza
- 2004 - Private Steer
- 2003 - Grand Armee
- 2002 - Sunline
- 2001 - Assertive Lad
- 2000 - Over
- 1999 - Sunline
- 1998 - Catalan Opening
- 1997 - Secret Savings
- 1996 - Sprint By
- 1995 - Pharaoh
- 1994 - Pharaoh
- 1993 - Skating
- 1992 - Soho Square
- 1991 - Super Impose
- 1990 - Super Impose
- 1989 - Merimbula Bay
- 1988 - Lygon Arms
- 1987 - Magic Flute
- 1986 - Hula Chief
- 1985 - Row Of Waves
- 1984 - Vite Cheval
- 1983 - Emancipation
- 1982 - My Gold Hope
- 1981 - Lawman
- 1980 - Iko
- 1979 - Belmura Lad
- 1978 - Maybe Mahal
- 1977 - Just Ideal
- 1976 - Authentic Heir
- 1975 - Dalrello
- 1974 - Tontonan
- 1973 - Analie
- 1972 - Gunsynd
- 1971 - Rajah Sahib
- 1970 - Broker's Tip
- 1969 - Bye Bye
- 1968 - Unpainted
- 1967 - Tobin Bronze
- 1966 - Citius
- 1965 - Time And Tide
- 1964 - Persian Puzzle
- 1963 - Fine and Dandy
- 1962 - Te Poi
- 1961 - Fine and Dandy
- 1960 - Tudor Hill
- 1959 - Tudor Hill
- 1958 - Grenoble
- 1957 - Slogan II
- 1956 - Slogan II
- 1955 - Fire Dust
- 1954 - Karendi
- 1953 - Triclinium
- 1952 - Prelate
- 1951 - Oversight
- 1950 - Grey Boots
- 1949 - Bernbrook
- 1948 - The Diver
- 1947 - Blue Legend
- 1946 - Blue Legend
- 1945 - Abbeville
- 1944 - Goose Boy
- 1943 - Kingsdale
- 1942 - Tuhitarata
- 1941 - Mildura
- 1940 - Mildura
- 1939 - Gold Rod
- 1938 - Hamurah
- 1937 - Sarcherie
- 1936 - Cuddle
- 1935 - Hall Mark
- 1934 - Chatham
- 1933 - Winooka
- 1932 - Jacko
- 1931 - Sir Chrystopher
- 1930 - Venetian Lady
- 1929 - Karuma
- 1928 - Simeon's Fort
- 1927 - Don Moon
- 1926 - Valicare
- 1925 - Fujisan
- 1924 - Whittier
- 1923 - The Epicure
- 1922 - Julia Grey
- 1921 - Speciality
- 1920 - Sydney Damsel
- 1919 - Hem
- 1918 - Dame Acre
- 1917 - Wedding Day
- 1916 - Eurobin
- 1915 - Garlin
- 1914 - First Principle
- 1913 - Jolly Beggar
- 1912 - Lochano
- 1911 - Broadsword
- 1910 - Storey
- 1909 - Hyman
- 1908 - Togo
- 1907 - Istria
- 1906 - Little Toy
- 1905 - Famous
- 1904 - Chere Amie
- 1903 - Rose Petal
- 1902 - Sir Foote
- 1901 - Wakeful
- 1900 - Parapet
- 1899 - Vigorous
- 1898 - Syerla
- 1897 - Superb
- 1896 - Courallie
- 1895 - Delaware
- 1894 - Donizetti
- 1893 - Cremorne
- 1892 - Marvel
- 1891 - Paris
- 1890 - Sir William
- 1889 - Russley
- 1888 - Ben Bolt
- 1887 - Abner
- 1886 - Crossfire
- 1885 - St. Lawrence
- 1884 - Rataplan
- 1883 - Sardonyx
- 1882 - Stella
- 1881 - Rapid Bay
- 1880 - Queensland
- 1879 - The Hook
- 1878 - Laertes
- 1877 - Speculation
- 1876 - Briseis
- 1875 - Priam
- 1874 - Myrtle
- 1873 - Wanderer
- 1872 - Vixen
- 1871 - Sir William / Lottery^{(2)}
- 1870 - Barbelle^{(3)}
- 1869 - Tippler
- 1868 - Casino
- 1867 - Sir Solomon
- 1866 - Dundee

Notes:

- ^(1) Date of race rescheduled due to postponement of the Easter Saturday meeting because of the heavy track conditions. The meeting was moved to Easter Monday, 6 April 2015.
- ^(2) Dead heat
- ^(3) Falcon finished first but was disqualified.

== See also ==
- Adrian Knox Stakes
- Australian Derby
- Carbine Club Stakes (ATC)
- Chairman's Quality
- Inglis Sires
- Kindergarten Stakes
- P J Bell Stakes
- T J Smith Stakes
- List of Australian Group races
- Group races
- Doncaster Mile Stakes (Doncaster, England)
