= Kindergarten Stakes =

- Class: Group 3
- Location: Randwick Racecourse, Sydney, Australia
- Inaugurated: 1987
- Race type: Thoroughbred - flat
- Sponsor: Widden (2014-26)

Race information
- Distance: 1,100 metres
- Surface: Turf
- Track: Right-handed
- Qualification: Two year old
- Weight: Set weights colts and geldings – 56 1/2 kg fillies – 54 1/2 kg
- Purse: A$250,000 (2026)

The Kindergarten Stakes, is an Australian Turf Club Group 3 Australian Thoroughbred horse race for horses aged two years old, at set weights, over a distance of 1100 metres at Randwick Racecourse, Sydney, Australia in the autumn during the ATC Championships series.

== History ==
The race was inaugurated in 1987.

It was held annually in March prior to the Golden Slipper Stakes but in 2012 was moved to April as part of the Australian Derby Day race card at Randwick.

The following thoroughbreds have captured the Kindergarten Stakes – Golden Slipper double:
Star Watch (1988), Bint Marscay (1993), Guineas (1997), Belle Du Jour (2000) and Forensics (2007)

=== Grade ===
- 1989–1997 - Listed Race
- 1998 onwards - Group 3

=== Venue ===
- 1987–1994 - Warwick Farm
- 1995 - Randwick
- 1996–2000 - Warwick Farm
- 2001 - Randwick
- 2002–2007 - Warwick Farm
- 2008–2009 - Randwick
- 2010 - Warwick Farm
- 2011 onwards - Randwick

=== Name ===
- Prior to 2017 - Kindergarten Stakes
- 2017 - Widden 150th Anniversary Stakes

== Winners ==
The following are past winners of the race.

- 2026 - Blue Door
- 2025 - North England
- 2024 - Espionage
- 2023 - Libertad
- 2022 - Semillion
- 2021 - Paulele
- 2020 - Doubtland
- 2019 - Bivouac
- 2018 - Paquirri
- 2017 - Property
- 2016 - ^{(1)}El Divino / Astern
- 2015^{(2)} - Furnaces
- 2014 - Hallowed Crown
- 2013 - Safeguard
- 2012 - Dance On Stars
- 2011 - Anise
- 2010 - Solar Charged
- 2009 - Wanted
- 2008 - Mr Profumo
- 2007 - Forensics
- 2006 - Plagiarize
- 2005 - Flying Pegasus
- 2004 - Crimson Reign
- 2003 - Niello
- 2002 - Snowland
- 2001 - Royal Courtship
- 2000 - Belle Du Jour
- 1999 - Easy Rocking
- 1998 - Peat Bog
- 1997 - Guineas
- 1996 - Armidale
- 1995 - Furacao
- 1994 - Dr. Zackary
- 1993 - Bint Marscay
- 1992 - Slight Chance
- 1991 - Vionnet
- 1990 - Bold Tie
- 1989 - Show County
- 1988 - Star Watch
- 1987 - Christmas Tree

Notes:

- ^(1) Dead heat
- ^(2) Date of race rescheduled due to postponement of the Easter Saturday meeting because of the heavy track conditions. The meeting was moved to Easter Monday, 6 April 2015.

== See also ==
- Adrian Knox Stakes
- Australian Derby
- Carbine Club Stakes (ATC)
- Chairman's Quality
- Doncaster Mile
- Inglis Sires
- P J Bell Stakes
- T J Smith Stakes
- List of Australian Group races
- Group races
