= Sires' Produce Stakes (ATC) =

Inglis Sires' registered as the ATC Sires' Produce Stakes
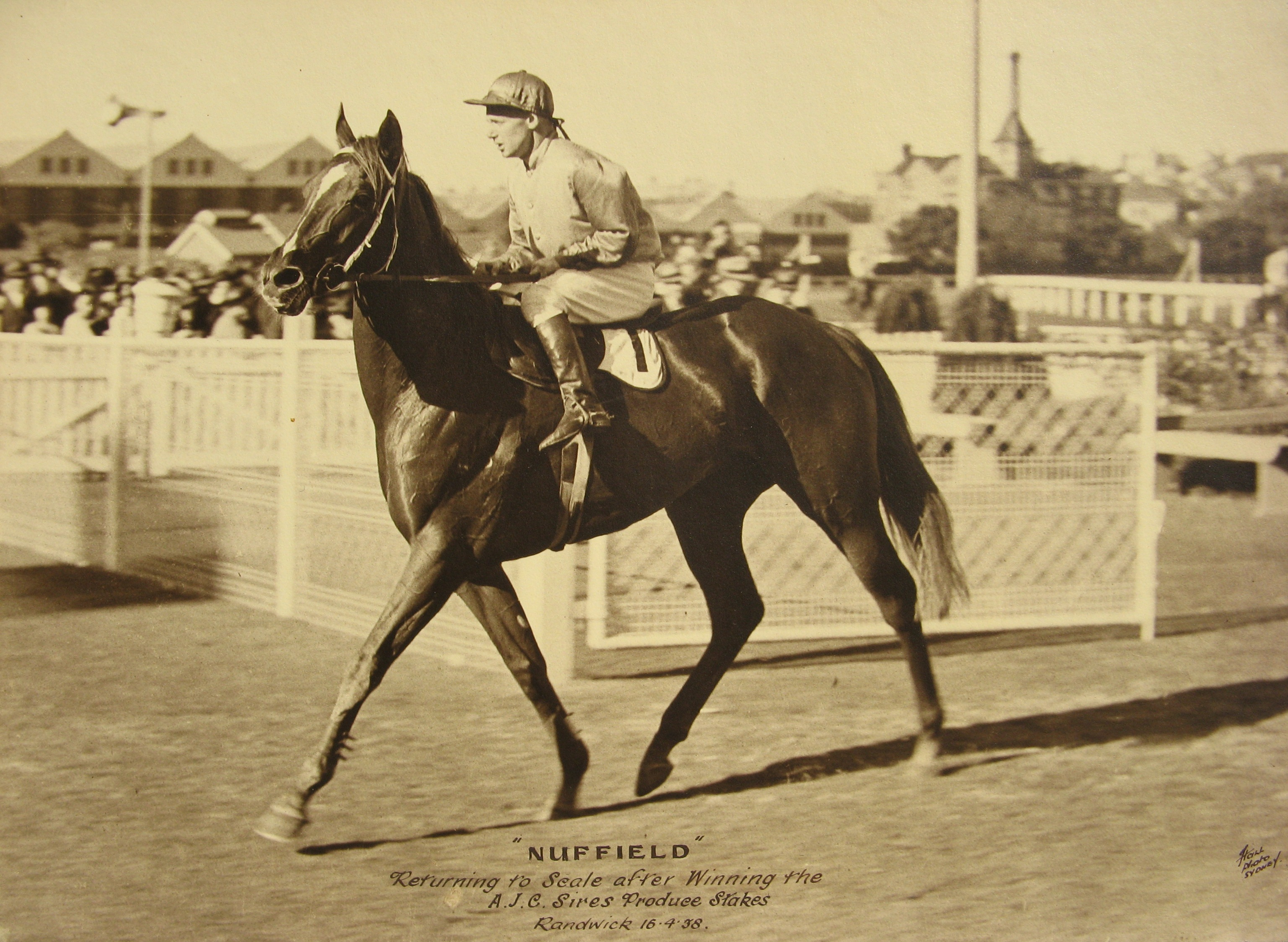
- Nuffield, 1938 winner
- Class: Group 1
- Location: Randwick Racecourse, Sydney, Australia
- Inaugurated: 1867
- Race type: Thoroughbred - flat
- Sponsor: Inglis (2006-08, 2010-26)

Race information
- Distance: 1,400 metres
- Surface: Turf
- Track: Right-handed
- Qualification: Two year old
- Weight: Set weights colts and geldings – 56 1/2 kg fillies – 54 1/2 kg
- Purse: A$1,000,000 (2026)

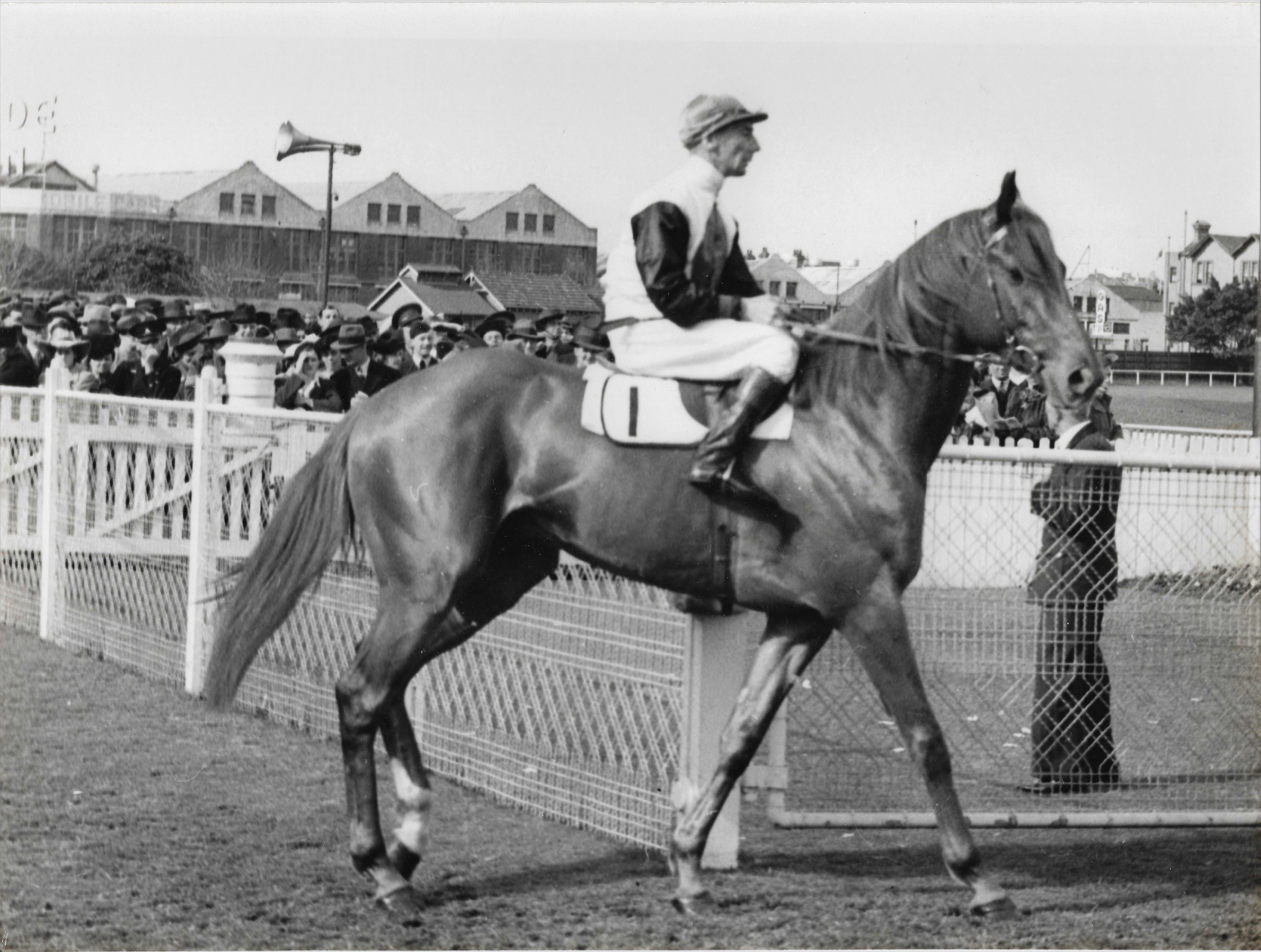
Yaralla, 1941 winner

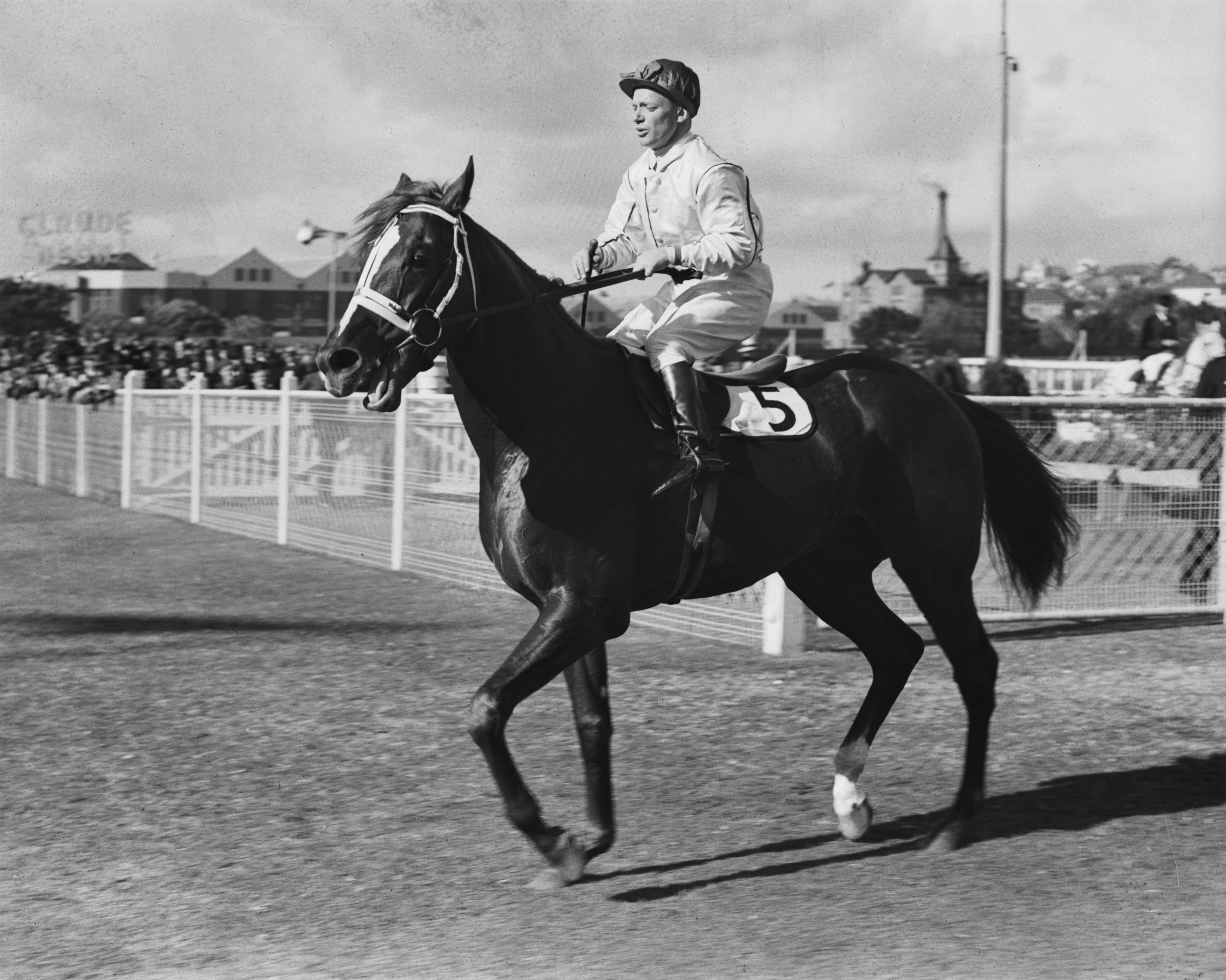
Ajax, 1937 winner

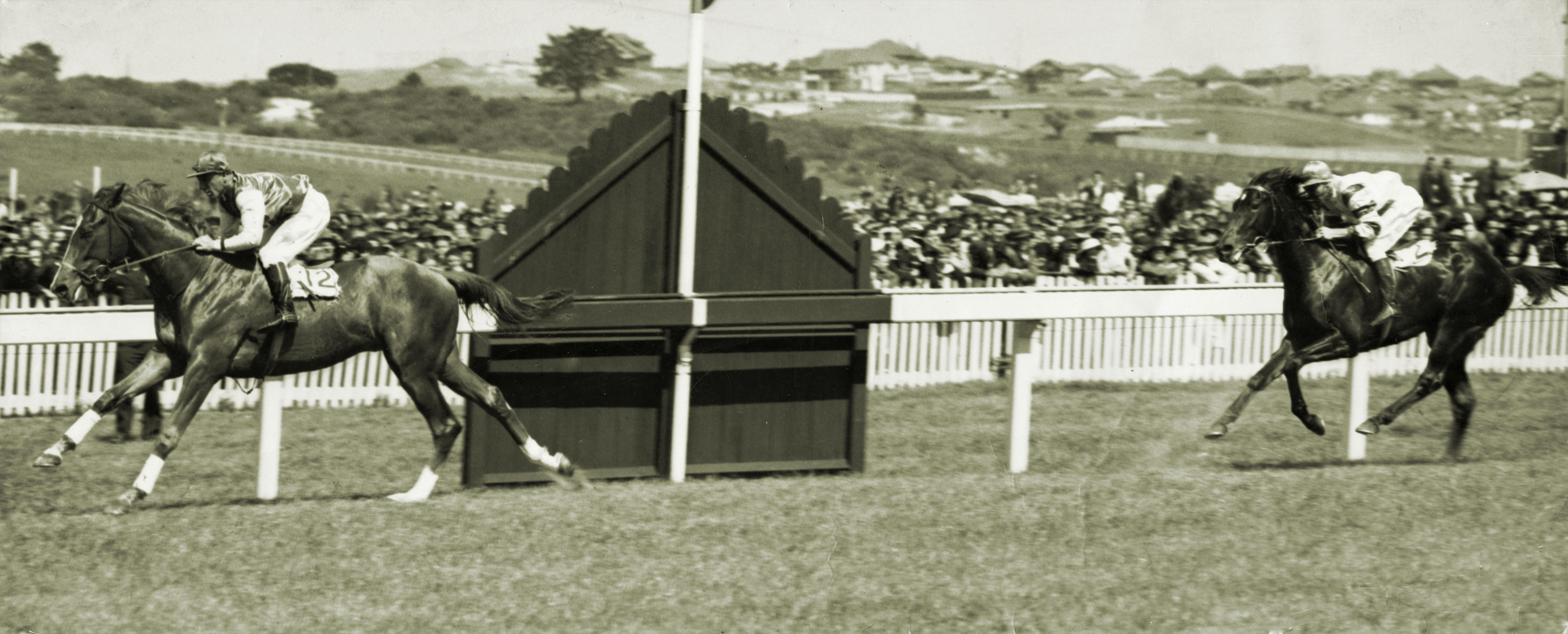
Gold Rod, 1936 winner

The Inglis Sires', registered as the Sires Produce Stakes, is an Australian Turf Club Group 1 Thoroughbred horse race for two-year-olds at Set Weights run over a distance of 1,400 metres at Randwick Racecourse, Sydney, Australia in April during the ATC Championships Carnival.

== History ==
The race was first run over one mile in 1867 and won by Glencoe. Between 1905 and 1908 it was run over 6 furlongs.

This race forms the middle leg of the Australian two-year-old "Triple Crown", which also consists of the Golden Slipper Stakes (1,200m) and the Champagne Stakes (1,600m).

The following horses attained the Golden Slipper Stakes – Sires' Produce Stakes (ATC) double: Fine and Dandy (1958), Eskimo Prince (1964), Baguette (1970), Tontonan (1973), Toy Show (1975), Luskin Star (1977), Full On Aces (1981), Tierce (1991), Burst (1992), Merlene (1996), Dance Hero (2004), Sebring (2008), Pierro (2012) and Fireburn (2022).

Champion horses who won the Golden Slipper but were beaten in the ATC Sires’ Produce include: Todman, Sky High and Vain.

=== Name ===
Since 2014 the race has been run as the Inglis Sires.

=== 1930 and 1933 racebooks ===
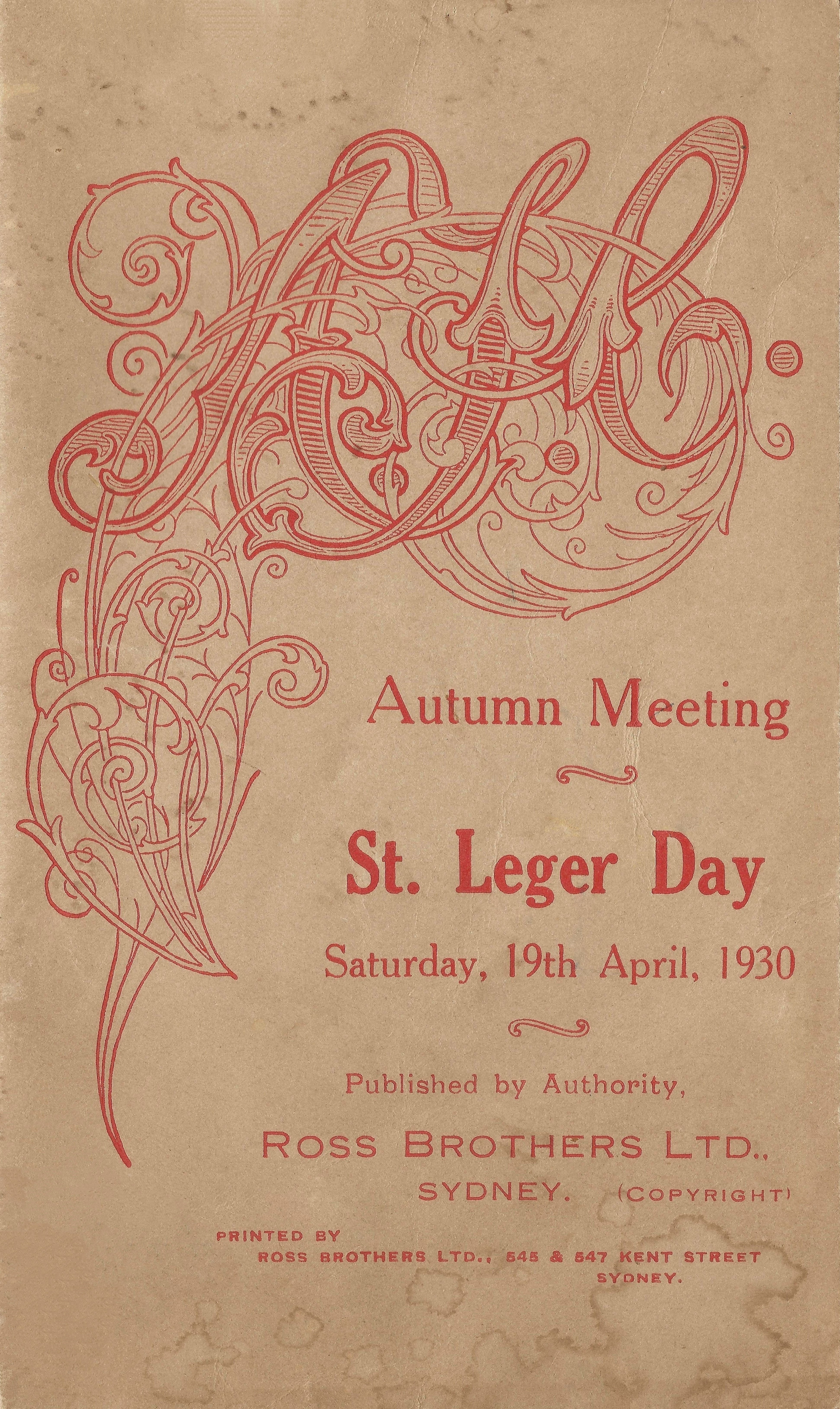
1930 AJC St Leger racebook front cover

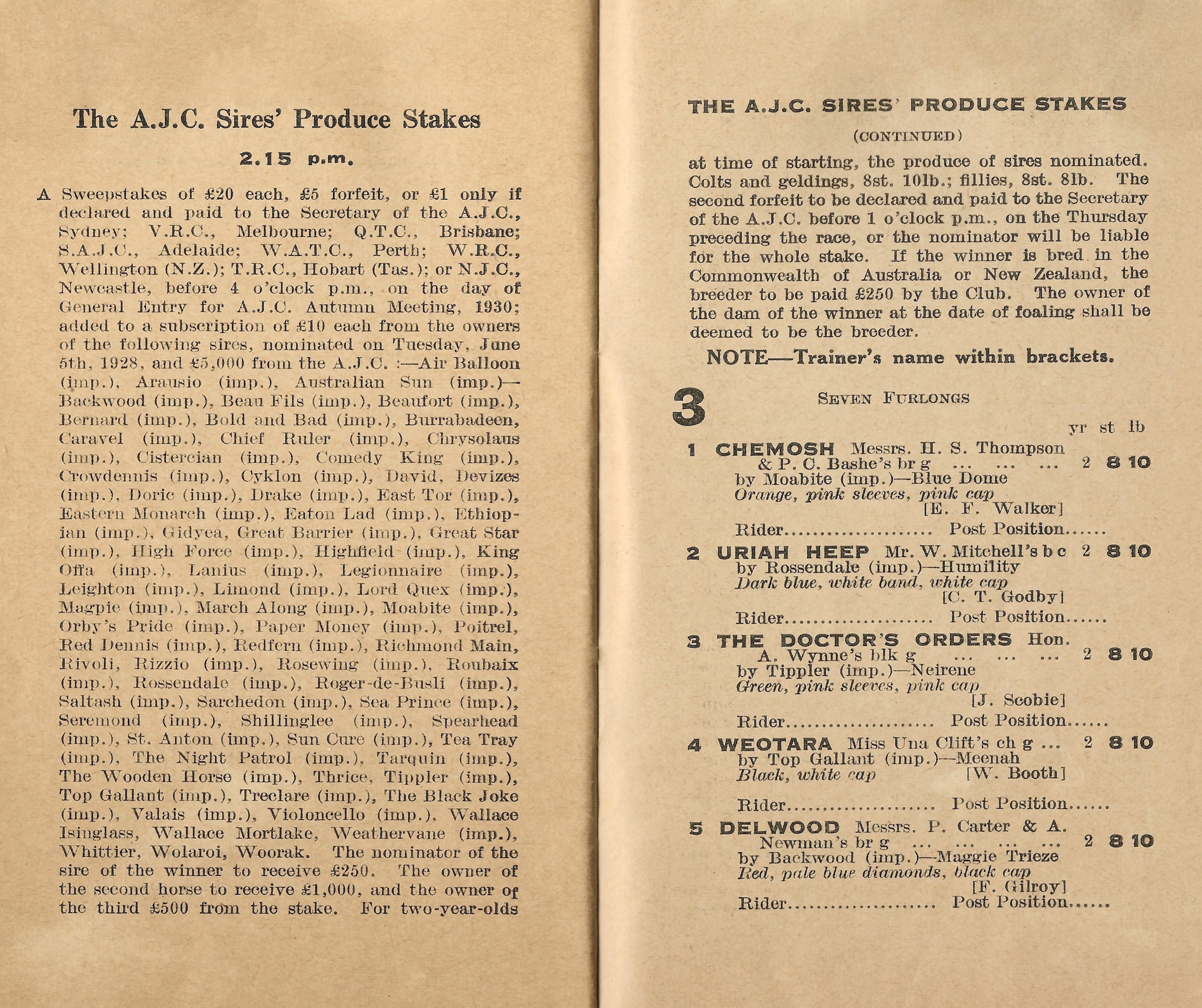
1930 AJC Sires Produce Stakes page showing the winner, The Doctor's Orders

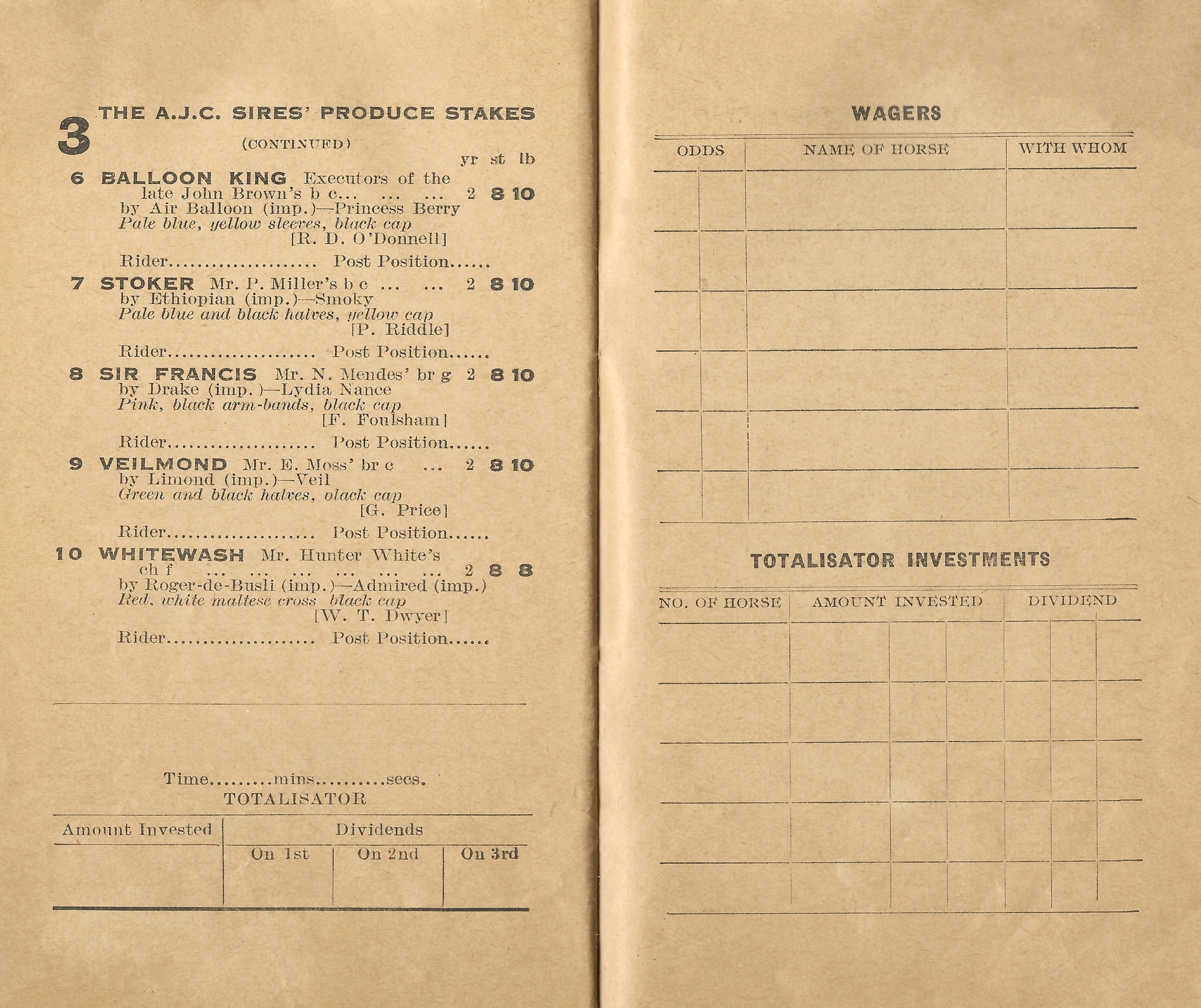
1930 AJC Sires Produce Stakes page showing starters and results

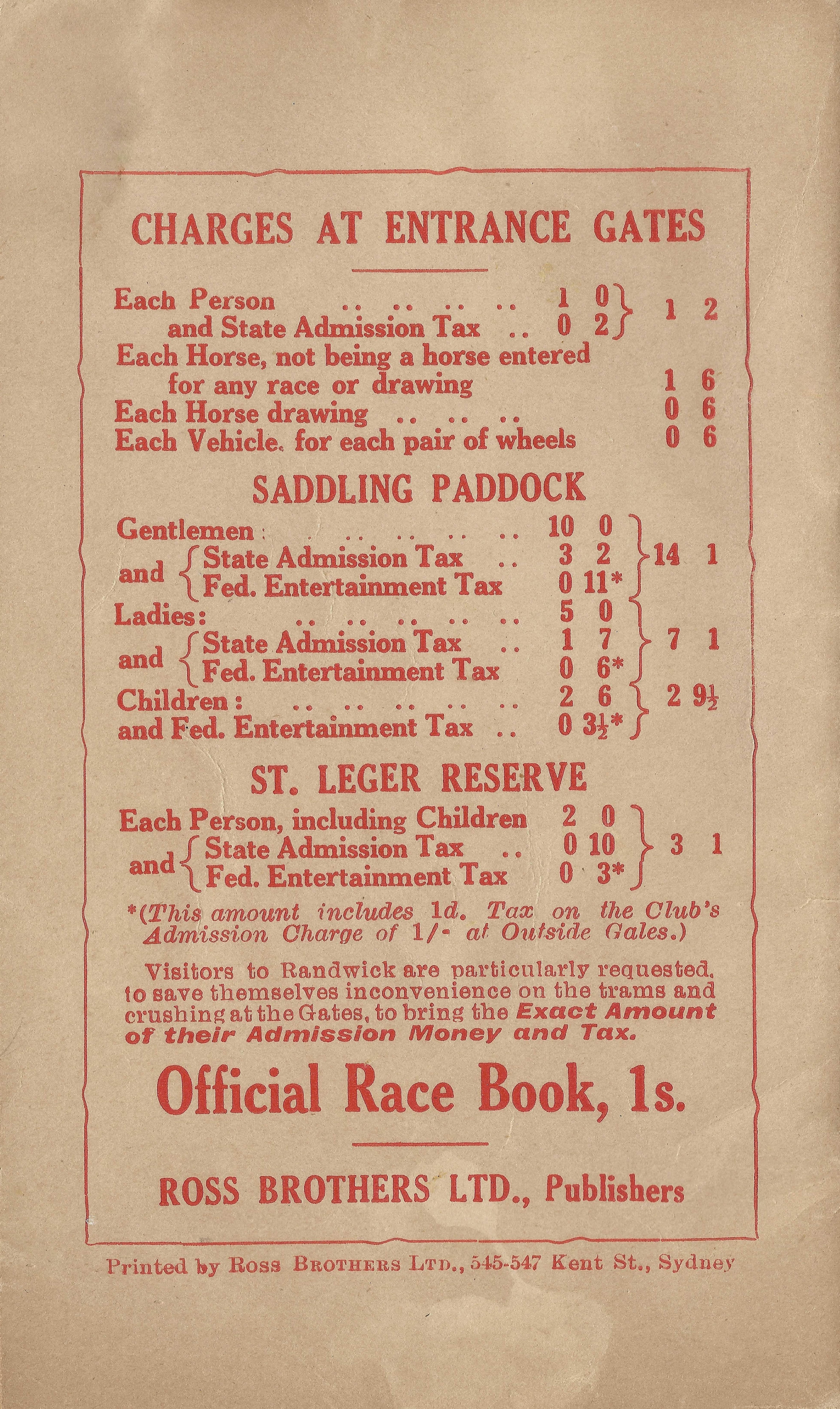
Back cover showing charges at the entrance gates

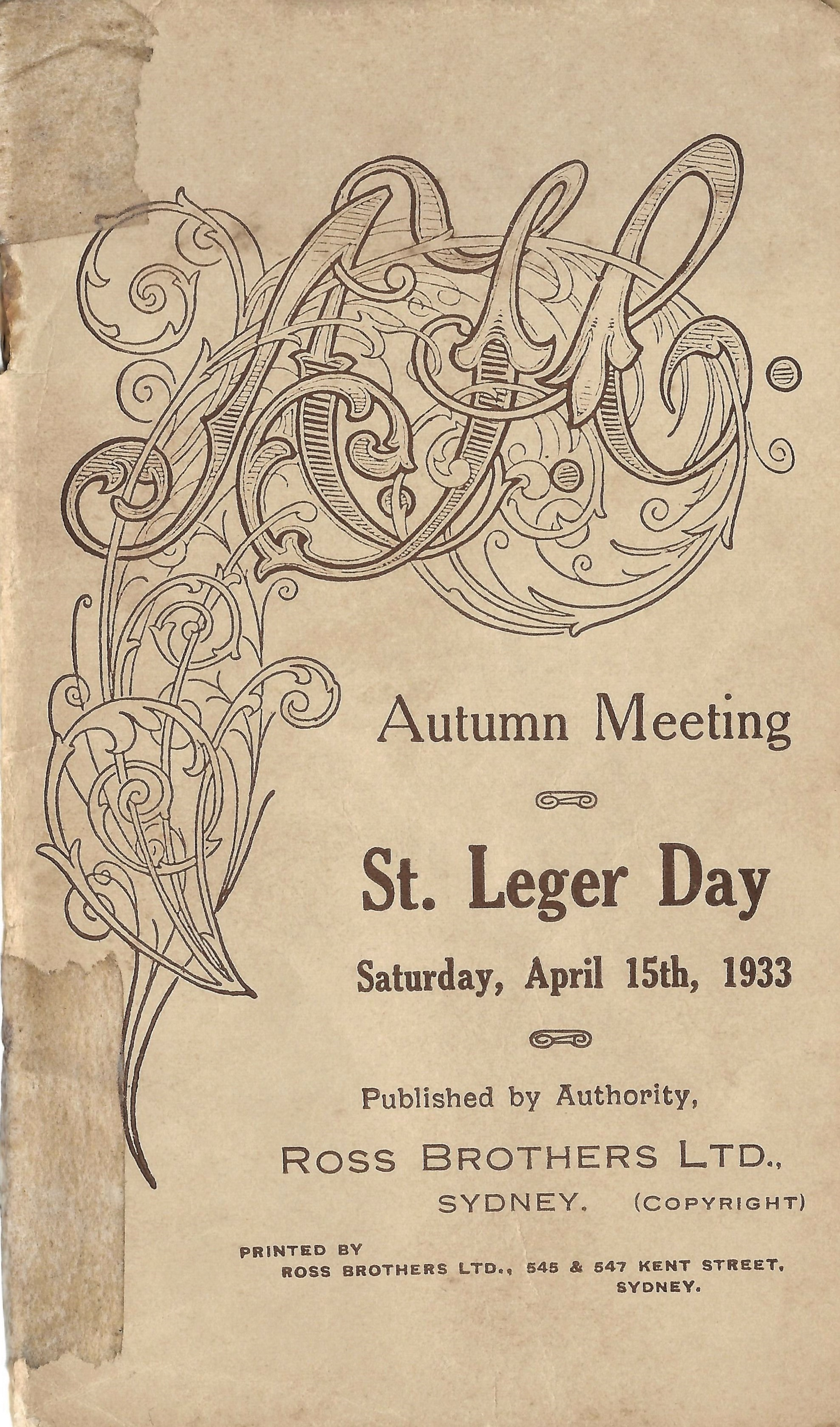
1933 AJC St Leger racebook front cover

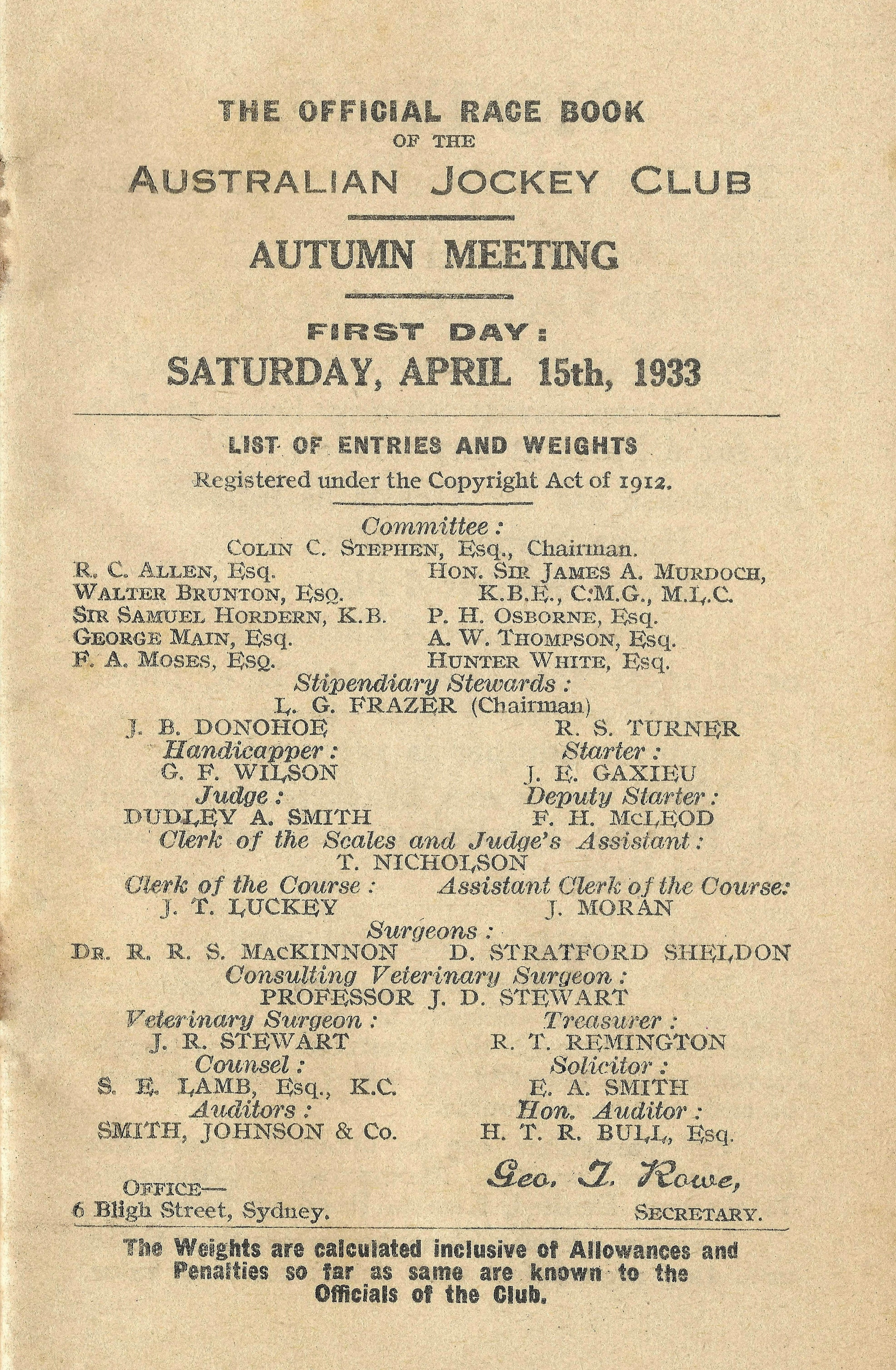
1933 AJC St Leger racebook showing raceday officials

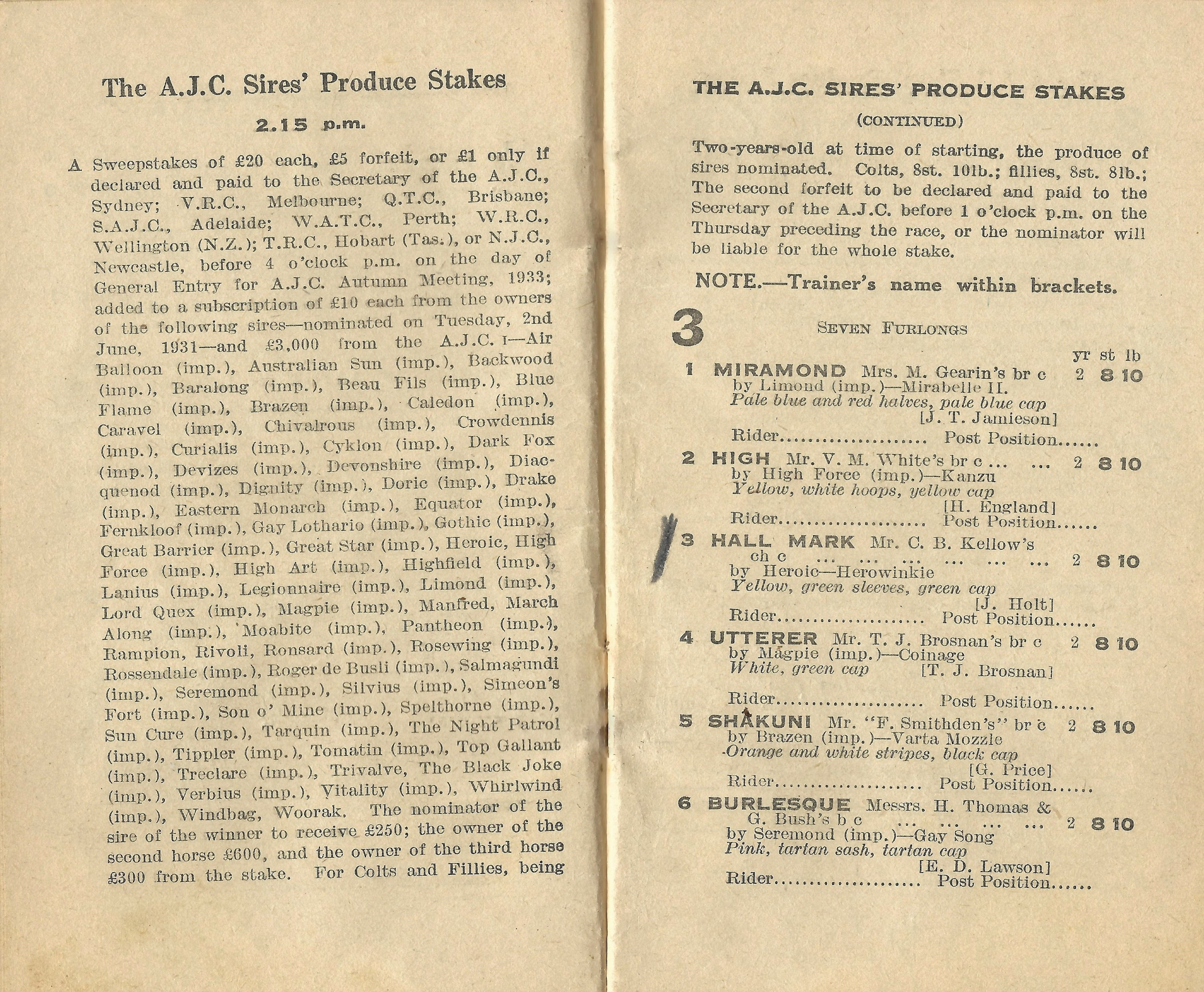
1933 AJC Sires Produce Stakes page showing conditions and winner, Hall Mark

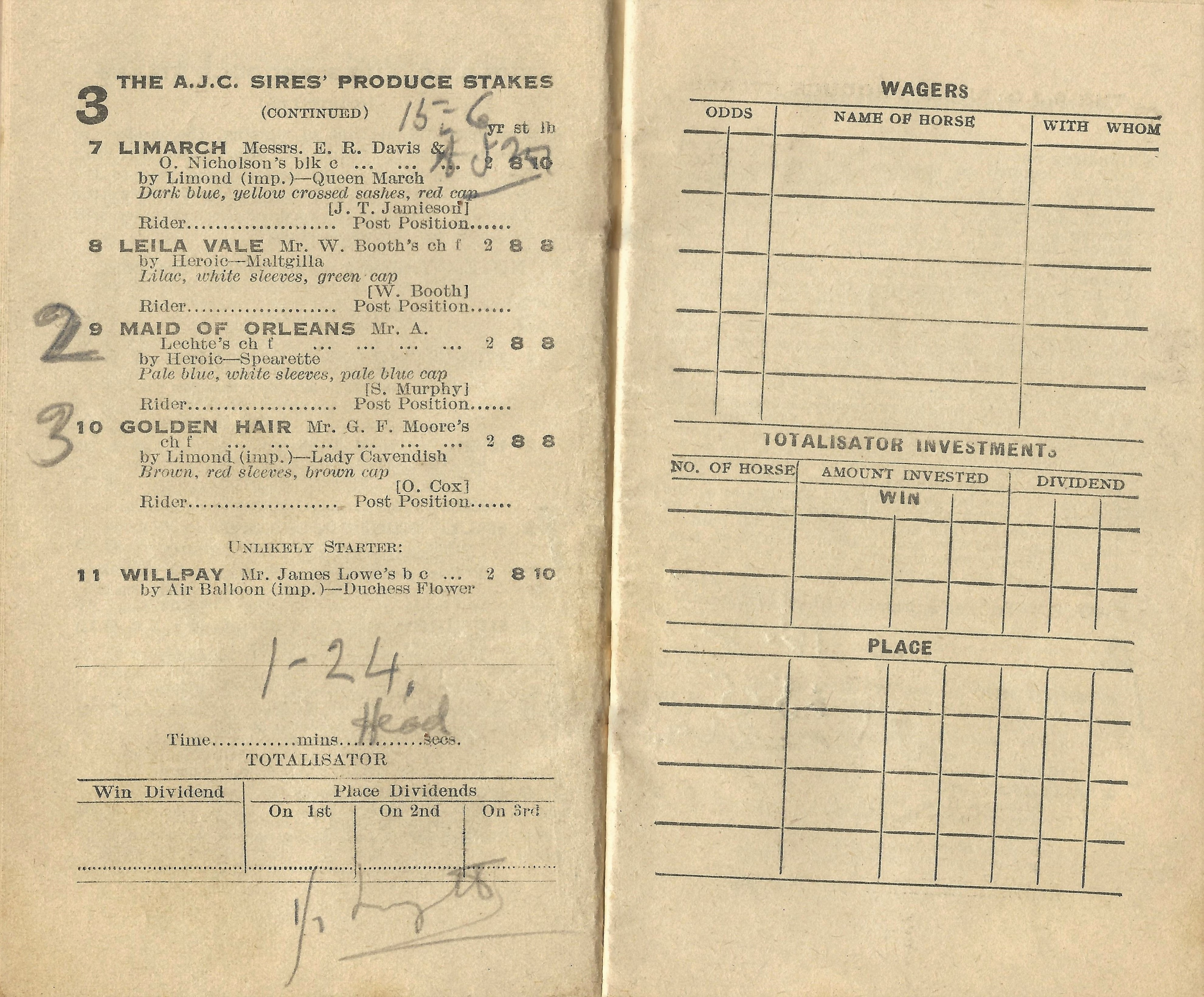
1933 AJC Sires Produce Stakes page showing starters and results

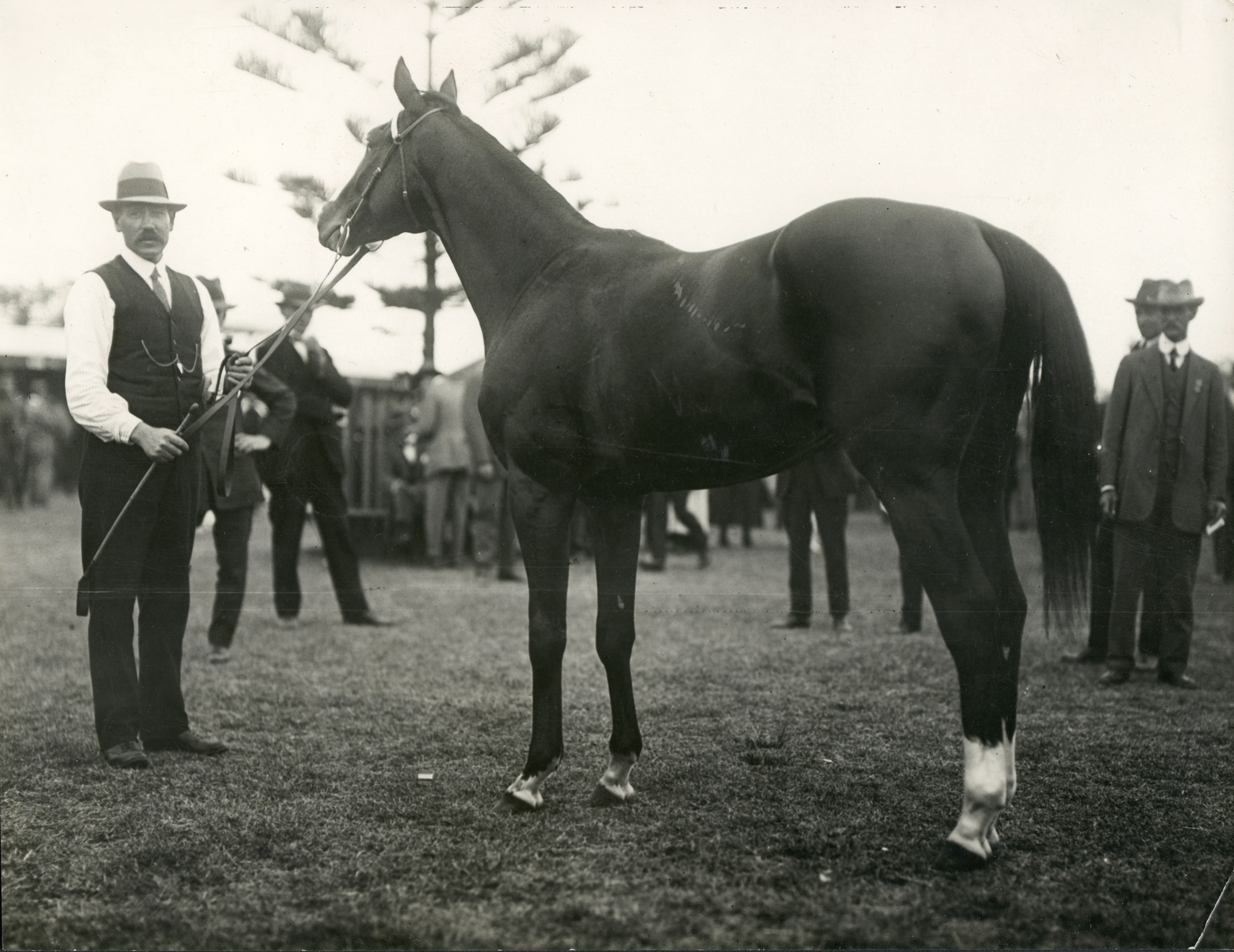
Outlook, 1918 winner

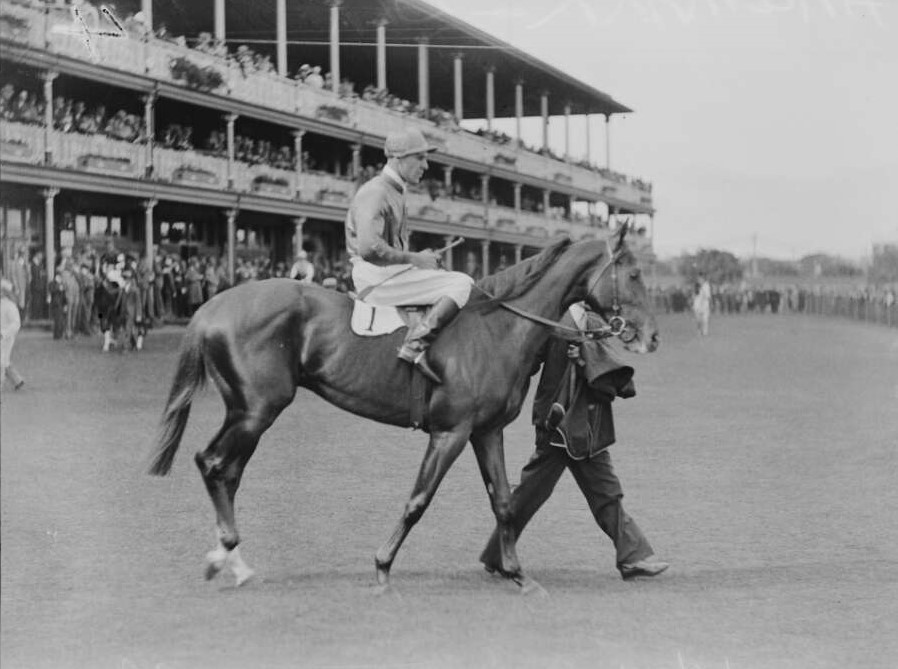
Hall Mark, 1933 winner

== Winners ==
The following are past winners of the race.

- 2026 - Campione D'italia
- 2025 - Vinrock
- 2024 - Manaal
- 2023 - Militarize
- 2022 - Fireburn
- 2021 - Anamoe
- 2020 - King's Legacy
- 2019 - Microphone
- 2018 - El Dorado Dreaming
- 2017 - Invader
- 2016 - Yankee Rose
- 2015^{(1)} - Pride Of Dubai
- 2014 - Peggy Jean
- 2013 - Guelph
- 2012 - Pierro
- 2011 - Helmet
- 2010 - Yosei
- 2009 - Manhattan Rain
- 2008 - Sebring
- 2007 - Camarilla
- 2006 - Excites
- 2005 - Fashions Afield
- 2004 - Dance Hero
- 2003 - Hasna
- 2002 - Victory Vein
- 2001 - Viscount
- 2000 - Assertive Lad
- 1999 - Align
- 1998 - Alf
- 1997 - Encounter
- 1996 - Merlene
- 1995 - Octagonal
- 1994 - St. Covet
- 1993 - Tristalove
- 1992 - Burst
- 1991 - Tierce
- 1990 - Rhythmic Charm
- 1989 - Reganza
- 1988 - Comely Girl
- 1987 - Snippets
- 1986 - Diamond Shower
- 1985 - Wonga Prince
- 1984 - Victory Prince
- 1983 - Keepers
- 1982 - Mighty Manitou
- 1981 - Full On Aces
- 1980 - Shaybisc
- 1979 - Zephyr Zip
- 1978 - Karaman
- 1977 - Luskin Star
- 1976 - Desirable
- 1975 - Toy Show
- 1974 - Gretel
- 1973 - Tontonan
- 1972 - Sovereign Slipper
- 1971 - Latin Knight
- 1970 - Baguette
- 1969 - Beau Babylon
- 1968 - Black Onyx
- 1967 - Ruling Ways
- 1966 - Prince Max
- 1965 - Peace Council
- 1964 - Eskimo Prince
- 1963 - Time And Tide
- 1962 - Bogan Road
- 1961 - Young Brolga
- 1960 - Wenona Girl
- 1959 - Fine And Dandy
- 1958 - Man Of Iron
- 1957 - Tulloch
- 1956 - Gay Sierra
- 1955 - Kingster
- 1954 - Lindbergh
- 1953 - Royal Stream
- 1952 - Pure Fire
- 1951 - Ocean Bound
- 1950 - True Course
- 1949 - Field Boy
- 1948 - Riptide
- 1947 - Temeraire
- 1946 - Flying Duke
- 1945 - Magnificent
- 1944 - Shannon
- 1943 - Mayfowl
- 1942 - Hall Stand
- 1941 - Yaralla
- 1940 - Lucrative
- 1939 - Reading
- 1938 - Nuffield
- 1937 - Ajax
- 1936 - Gold Rod
- 1935 - Young Idea
- 1934 - Dark Sky
- 1933 - Hall Mark
- 1932 - Kuvera
- 1931 - Ammon Ra
- 1930 - The Doctor's Orders
- 1929 - Honour
- 1928 - Mollison
- 1927 - Royal Feast
- 1926 - Cyden
- 1925 - Los Gatos
- 1924 - Leslie Wallace
- 1923 - The Monk
- 1922 - Soorak
- 1921 - Furious
- 1920 - Glenacre
- 1919 - Millieme
- 1918 - Outlook
- 1917 - Thrice
- 1916 - Thana
- 1915 - Cetigne
- 1914 - Imshi
- 1913 - Radnor
- 1912 - Wolawa
- 1911 - Gillamatong
- 1910 - Beverage
- 1909 - Prince Foote
- 1908 - Malt Queen
- 1907 - The Owl
- 1906 - Collarit
- 1905 - Binnia
- 1904 - 1894 - no race
- 1893 - Light Artillery
- 1892 - Autonomy
- 1891 - Stromboli
- 1890 - Titan
- 1889 - Rudolph
- 1888 - Miss Thirza
- 1887 - Abercorn
- 1886 - Trident
- 1885 - Uralla
- 1884 - Garfield
- 1883 - Warwick
- 1882 - Jessie
- 1881 - Spinningdale
- 1880 - Geraldine/Kamilaroi^{(2)}
- 1879 - Nellie
- 1878 - His Lordship
- 1877 - Chester
- 1876 - Robinson Crusoe
- 1875 - Malta
- 1874 - Kingsborough
- 1873 - Rose D'amour
- 1872 - Lecturer
- 1871 - Hamlet
- 1870 - Lady Clifden
- 1869 - Paradise
- 1868 - Coquette
- 1867 - Glencoe

Notes:

- ^(1) Date of race rescheduled due to postponement of the Easter Saturday meeting because of the heavy track conditions. The meeting was moved to Easter Monday, 6 April 2015.
- ^(2) Dead heat

== See also ==
- Adrian Knox Stakes
- Australian Derby
- Carbine Club Stakes (ATC)
- Chairman's Quality
- Doncaster Mile
- Kindergarten Stakes
- P J Bell Stakes
- T J Smith Stakes
- Sires' Produce Stakes (BRC)
- Sires' Produce Stakes (SAJC)
- Sires' Produce Stakes (WA)
- Sires' Produce Stakes (VRC)
- List of Australian Group races
