= Gunsynd =

Australian-bred Thoroughbred racehorse

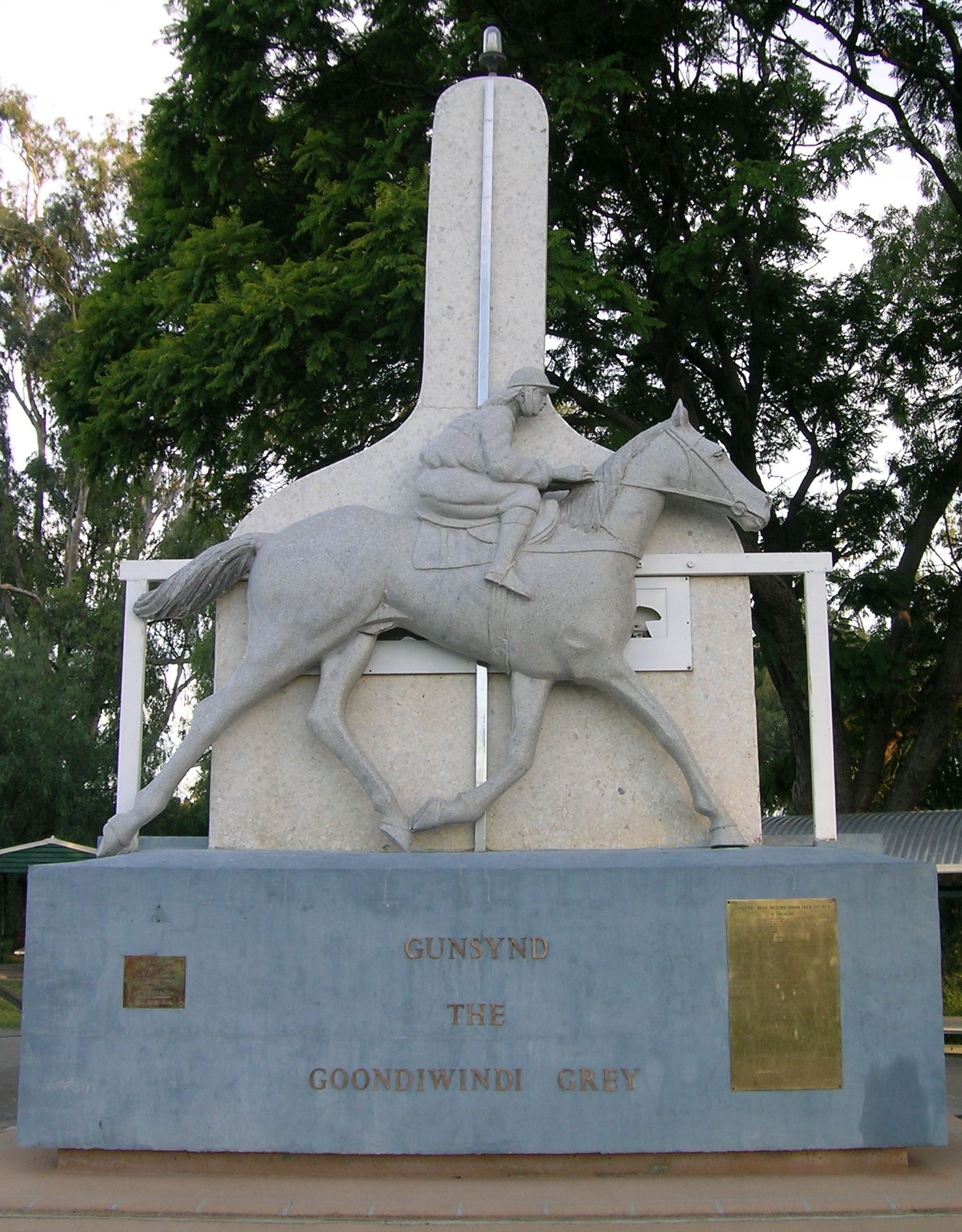
- Statue of Gunsynd in Goondiwindi, Queensland.
- Sire: Sunset Hue
- Grandsire: Star Kingdom (IRE)
- Dam: Woodie Wonder
- Damsire: Newtown Wonder
- Sex: Stallion
- Foaled: 4 October 1967
- Died: 29 April 1983 (aged 15)
- Country: Australia
- Colour: Grey
- Breeder: John Clift, Joe McNamara
- Owner: Bill Bishop, G. Pippos; G.N McMicking, A.V. Coorey
- Trainer: Bill Wehlow (at 2 & 3); T J Smith (at 4 & 5)
- Record: 54: 29-6½-8
- Earnings: A$280,455

Major wins
- Hopeful Stakes (1969); Chelmsford Stakes (1970); Rawson Stakes (1971, 1973); Epsom Handicap (1971); Toorak Handicap (1971); Sandown Cup (1971); George Adams Handicap (1971); Futurity Stakes (1972); Frederick Clissold Handicap (1972); Hill Stakes (1972); VRC Queens Plate (1972); Doncaster Handicap (1972); Colin Stephen Stakes (1972); Caulfield Stakes (1972); W. S. Cox Plate (1972); VRC Queen Elizabeth Stakes (1972, 1973); Blamey Stakes (1973); AJC Autumn Stakes (1973)

Awards
- Australian Champion Racehorse of the Year (1972)

Honours
- Queensland Icon (2004); Statue at Goondiwindi, Queensland; Australian Racing Hall of Fame; Gunsynd Mile at Doomben Racecourse
- Last updated on 25 April 2010

Gunsynd (4 October 1967 – 29 April 1983) was a champion Australian Thoroughbred racehorse who won 29 races and A$280,455 in prize money. In his seven starts over one-mile (1,600-metre) he was only once defeated, by half-a-head in the Epsom Handicap.

== Breeding ==
Foaled in 1967, at The Dip Stud, at Breeza, New South Wales, Gunsynd was by the grey racehorse, Sunset Hue (by the imported sire, Star Kingdom), his dam was a twin foal, Woodie Wonder, that ran third at her only start. Woodie Wonder was by the sire, Newtown Wonder (GB). She was the dam of eight foals, six of which raced for three winners. A full brother to Gunsynd, Sunset Red, who won the WJ McKell Cup was the next best of Woodie Wonder's progeny.

== Early life ==
G. McMicking formed a syndicate with three others from his home town of Goondiwindi (pronounced Gundawindi) consisting of A. Bishop, J. Coorey and A. Pippos and purchased Gunsynd as a yearling for A$1,300 at the 1969 Brisbane sales. He was affectionately known as the Goondiwindi Grey because his owners came from Goondiwindi and he was a grey in appearance.

== Racing record ==
Originally trained by Bill Wehlow, and later by Tommy Smith, Gunsynd raced from 1969 to 1973. As a four-year-old, under handicap conditions, Gunsynd won four major mile races (approximately 1,600 metres) - the Epsom Handicap, the Toorak Handicap, the George Adams Handicap, and the Doncaster Handicap, and, at five, was narrowly beaten by Triton in the 1972 Epsom Handicap. In the Doncaster Handicap, he carried 9 stone 7 pounds (60 kilograms) to victory, and, in his second Epsom Handicap, was second with 62.5 kilograms. He then won the 1972 Cox Plate, was third, with 60.5 kilograms, to Piping Lane in the Melbourne Cup, and was named Australia's champion racehorse for the 1971–1972 season. Gunsynd was a favourite with the crowds due to his grey coat and his tremendous will to win, and was one of the best grey horses in the history of Australian racing.

When comparing Gunsynd's racing record and prize money to the prize money increases by 2019, if he had raced today his prize money would be over $10.9 million.

== Stud record ==
In 1973 Gunsynd syndicated as a stallion for $270,618 and retired to Kia Ora Stud. His progeny included just four stakes winners of eight stakes races, Bensynd (1974), Tsunami (1975, won the Hyperion Stakes at Ascot), Midnight Gun (1977) and Domino (1978). Gunsynd also sired Ammo Girl, the dam of Emancipation, who was named Australia's champion racehorse for the 1983–1984 season.

Suffering from cancer, Gunsynd was humanely euthanised at the age of 16.

== Honours ==
Gunsynd was named the VRC Horse of the Year in 1972 and inducted into the Australian Racing Hall of Fame. In 1973 Tex Morton recorded a song The Goondiwindi Grey (The Gunsynd Song), written by Nev Hauritz and Brian Wallace, as a tribute to him.

25,000 people farewelled Gunsynd at Doomben Racecourse in 1973 where he participated in an exhibition gallop.

A statue in his honour was erected in his hometown of Goondiwindi.

In 2009 as part of the Q150 celebrations, Gunsynd was announced as one of the Q150 Icons of Queensland for his role as a "sports legend".
