= Emancipation (horse) =

Australian-bred Thoroughbred racehorse

- Sire: Bletchingly
- Grandsire: Biscay
- Dam: Ammo Girl
- Damsire: Gunsynd
- Sex: Filly
- Foaled: 15 October 1979
- Country: Australia
- Colour: Grey
- Breeder: MC Hough, NSW
- Owner: Muskoka Farms (R.Lapointe)
- Trainer: Neville Begg
- Record: 28: 19-1-0
- Earnings: $550,510

Major wins
- Tea Rose Stakes (1982); VRC Carbine Club Stakes (1982); Edward Manifold Stakes (1982); Light Fingers Stakes (1983); Premiere Stakes (1983); Canterbury Stakes (1983); Chelmsford Stakes (1983); Hill Stakes (1983); George Ryder Stakes (1983,1984); Doncaster Handicap (1983); George Main Stakes (1983); Rosemount Classic (1984); Apollo Stakes (1984); Chipping Norton Stakes (1984); All Aged Stakes (1984)

Awards
- Australian Champion Racehorse of the Year (1984)

Honours
- Australian Racing Hall of Fame; Emancipation Stakes
- Last updated on October 23, 2009

Emancipation (foaled 1979) was a champion Australian Thoroughbred racehorse. By Bletchingly, Emancipation was a grey, like her dam, Ammo Girl, and her damsire, Gunsynd. She was bred by Mark Hough, in New South Wales, after her dam was purchased from trainer Tommy Smith for just $1,700 due to her unsound conformation and her breeding (her sire was standing at a fee of only $1,500 at the time). Her breeder was only interested in her as a broodmare, and approached her trainer, Neville Begg, to recommend someone who would lease her for racing purposes.

== Racing career ==
Unraced at two, Emancipation raced only at three and four, and won 19 of her 28 starts. These included six Group One wins - all in Sydney. At three, she won 10 of her 13 starts, and, in the autumn, defeated Manikato in the George Ryder Stakes before winning the Doncaster Handicap. At four, she won nine of her 15 starts, including a further five Group One wins. In the spring, her wins included the George Main Stakes, and, in autumn, the Chipping Norton Stakes, the Rosemount Classic, the George Ryder, and the All-Aged Stakes in successive starts. In her last two wins, she defeated the reigning Golden Slipper winner, Sir Dapper (then three). On the occasions that she didn't win, Emancipation was unplaced in eight of her nine starts, including two starts in Melbourne during the spring of 1983, where she tried at (and just beyond) 2,000 metres. In the second of these, she was unplaced behind Strawberry Road in the Cox Plate. At the end of the season, Emancipation was named Australia's champion racehorse in 1984.

== Breeding record ==
At stud, she produced Royal Pardon (by Vice Regal), a grey colt who was a stakeswinner and AJC Derby placegetter, while daughters Virage (by Kenmare) and La Suffragette (by Palace Music) have produced the multiple Group One winners Virage De Fortune (by Anabaa) and Railings (by Zabeel).
