= Carbine Club Stakes (ATC) =

Horse race in Australia

- Class: Group 3
- Location: Randwick Racecourse; Sydney, New South Wales, Australia
- Inaugurated: 1981
- Race type: Thoroughbred – Flat racing
- Sponsor: HKJC World Pool (2024-26)

Race information
- Distance: 1,600 metres
- Surface: Turf
- Track: Right-handed
- Qualification: Three-year-olds
- Weight: Set weights with penalties
- Purse: $250,000 (2026)

The Carbine Club Stakes is an Australian Turf Club Group 3 Thoroughbred horse race, for three year olds with set weights and penalties over a distance of 1,600 metres, held annually at Randwick Racecourse in Sydney, Australia, in April on the Australian Derby racecard.

== History ==
The race is named in honour of Carbine, a champion in the 19th century, including Melbourne Cup winner and dual Sydney Cup winner who made also a prolific impact in breeding of thoroughbreds in Australia and England.

=== Grade ===
- 1986–2010 - Listed Race
- 2011 onwards - Group 3

== Winners ==
The following are past winners of the race.

- 2026 - Autumn Break
- 2025 - Evaporate
- 2024 - Ducasse
- 2023 - The Fortune Teller
- 2022 - Straight Arron
- 2021 - Kiku
- 2020 - Entente
- 2019 - Ringerdingding
- 2018 - Muraaqeb
- 2017 - Acatour
- 2016 - He's Our Rokkii
- 2015^{(1)} - Hi World
- 2014 - Gypsy Diamond
- 2013 - Toydini
- 2012 - Fat Al
- 2011 - Needs Further
- 2010 - Al Dhafra
- 2009 - Orca
- 2008 - Road To Rock
- 2007 - Yasumori
- 2006 - Belmonte
- 2005 - Magnetism
- 2004 - Toulouse Lautrec
- 2003 - Who Did It
- 2002 - Wet Lips
- 2001 - Spurred On
- 2000 - Valuate
- 1999 - Le Zagaletta
- 1998 - Noise
- 1997 - The North
- 1996 - Mr. Piper
- 1995 - Juggler
- 1994 - Espinosa
- 1993 - Golden Sword
- 1992 - Conshana
- 1991 - New Acquaintance
- 1990 - Mink Jacket
- 1989 - Nanutarra
- 1988 - Rigoletto
- 1987 - Bigamy
- 1986 - Faris King
- 1985 - Double Dandy
- 1984 - Bring Home
- 1983 - Fairy God
- 1982 - Noble Ambition
- 1981 - Around The Traps

Notes:

- ^(1) Date of race rescheduled due to postponement of the Easter Saturday meeting because of the heavy track conditions. The meeting was moved to Easter Monday, 6 April 2015.

== See also ==
- Adrian Knox Stakes
- Australian Derby
- Chairman's Quality
- Doncaster Mile
- Inglis Sires
- Kindergarten Stakes
- P J Bell Stakes
- T J Smith Stakes
- Carbine Club Stakes (VRC)
- List of Australian Group races
- Group races
