= Carbon Copy (horse) =

Australian champion racehorse (born 1945)

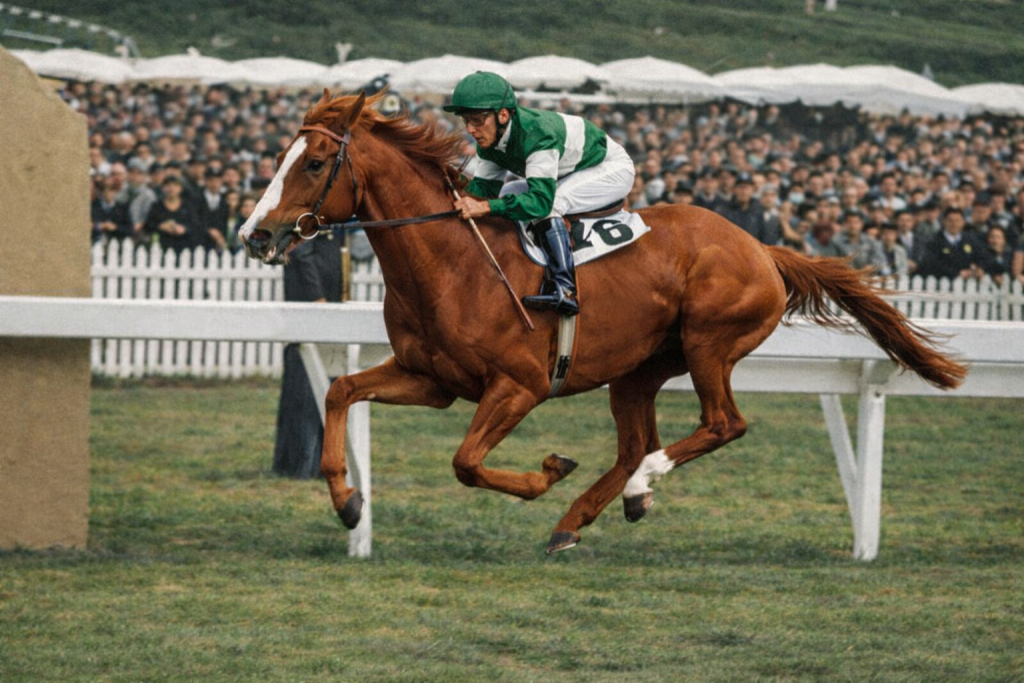
- Carbon Copy and Neville Sellwood
- Sire: Helios (GB)
- Grandsire: Hyperion (GB)
- Dam: Havers (AUS)
- Damsire: Windbag (AUS)
- Sex: Stallion
- Foaled: 1945
- Country: Australia
- Colour: Chestnut
- Breeder: Silk Bros
- Owner: A.G.Silk & "H.J Ascot"
- Trainer: Des McCormick
- Record: 45: 14-10-6
- Earnings: £A 38,194 or AUD 76,388

Major wins
- AJC Derby (1948); W S Cox Plate (1948); St George Stakes (1949); VRC Kings Plate (1949); Chipping Norton Stakes (1949,1950); AJC St Leger (1949); Sydney Cup (1949); AJC Plate (1949); Craven Plate (1949); AJC Randwick Plate (1949); VRC Carbine Stakes (1950)

Des McCormick, Trainer

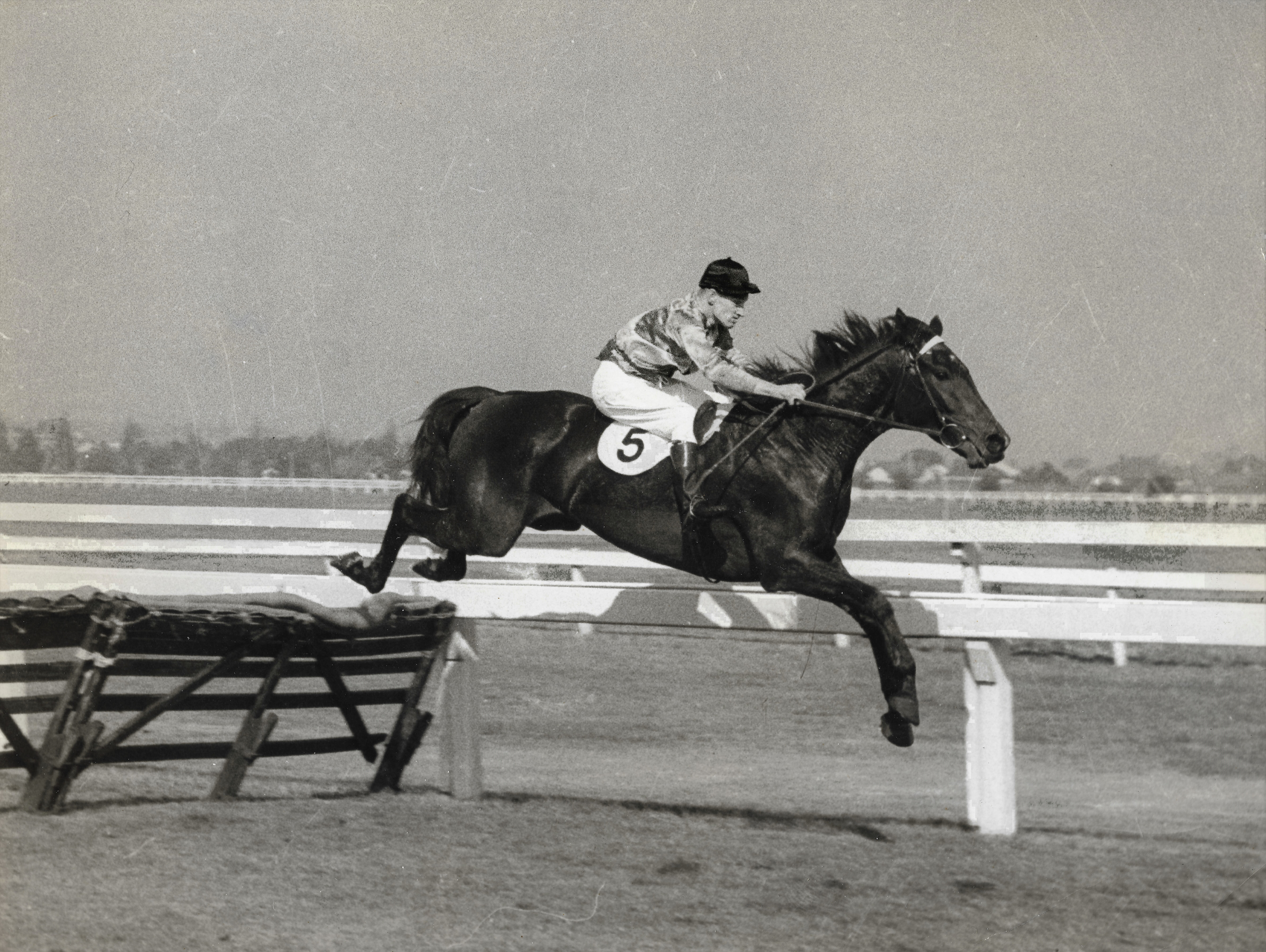
Van Perri, W.Londregan

Carbon Copy was an Australian chestnut Thoroughbred horse, who raced from a two-year-old to a five year old recording 14 wins from 1 mile to 2 miles with regular jockey Scobie Breasley winning eight races was a member of a vintage crop of three year olds 1948–1949 including Comic Court, Foxzami, Vagabond and Bernbrook.

== Breeding ==
Carbon Copy was bred by the Silk Bros at their Glen Devon stud Werribee, Victoria by sire Helios (GB) from the mare Havers (AUS) by Windbag, Helios was a Leading sire in Australia and of the classic winner Beau Gem 1947 VRC Victoria Derby and a broodmare sire.

== Racing career ==
Carbon Copy raced between 1948 -1951 and raced for four seasons a sensation in his 3 year old season winning major races in Sydney and Melbourne raced in grand company against the champions Comic Court & Delta and after winning the 1949 AJC Plate at Randwick Racecourse defeating Melbourne Cup winner Russia by 10 lengths was to become the greatest stake winning 3 year old in Australian turf history with an offer of 95,000 pounds being refused by the owners. Carbon Copy's best son after retiring to stud where he was foaled at was the 1962 AJC Sydney Cup winner Grand Print. Des McCormick trainer was a former drover from Wangaratta was also a successful trainer of jumpers with notables being Winterset and Van Perri from his Mordialloc, Victoria stables. Des McCormick was inducted into the Australian Racing Hall of Fame in 2019.

Carbon Copy's racing record: 45 starts for 14 wins, 10 seconds, 6 thirds.

=== 1948 and 1949 racebooks ===
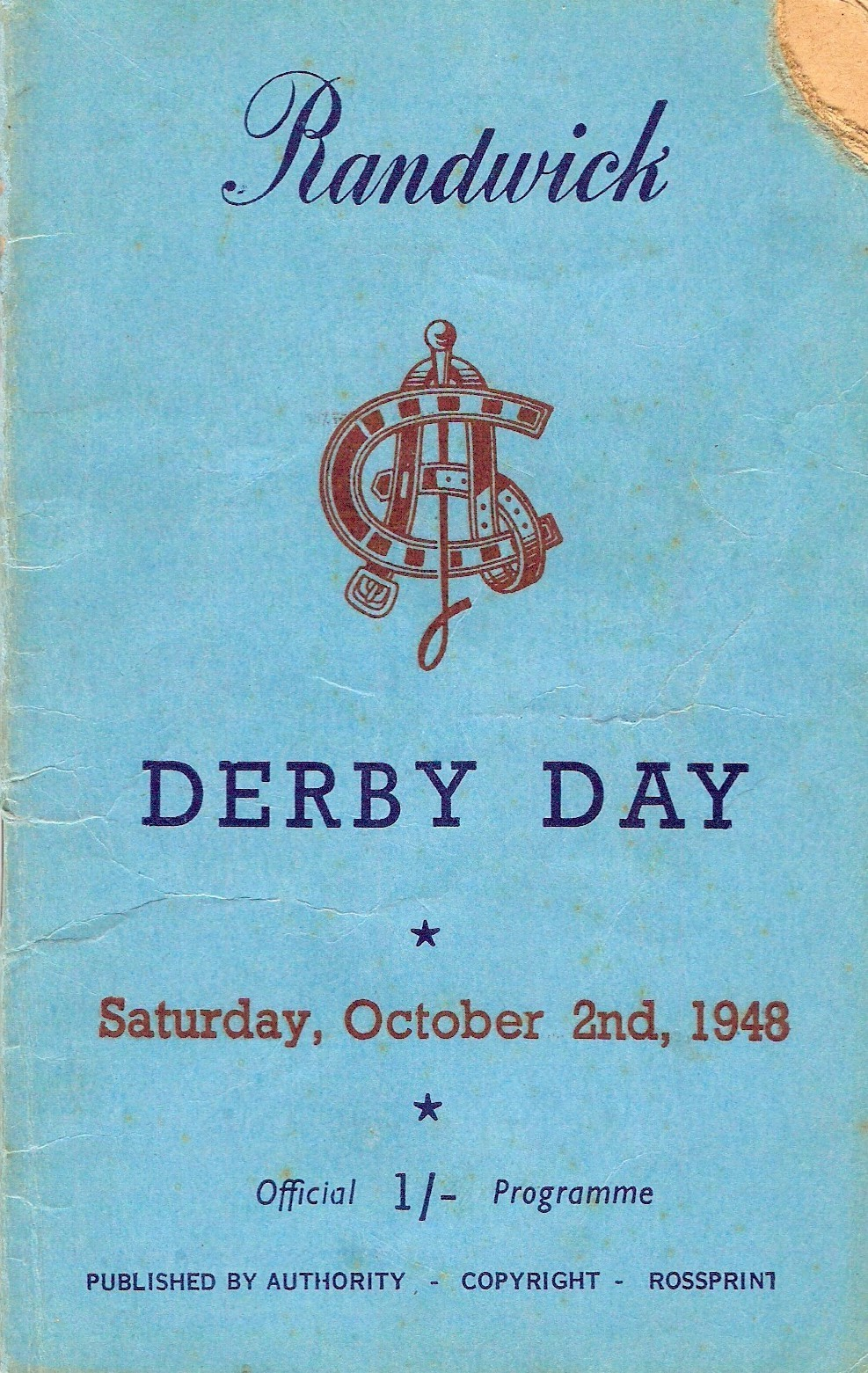
1948 AJC Derby racebook front cover

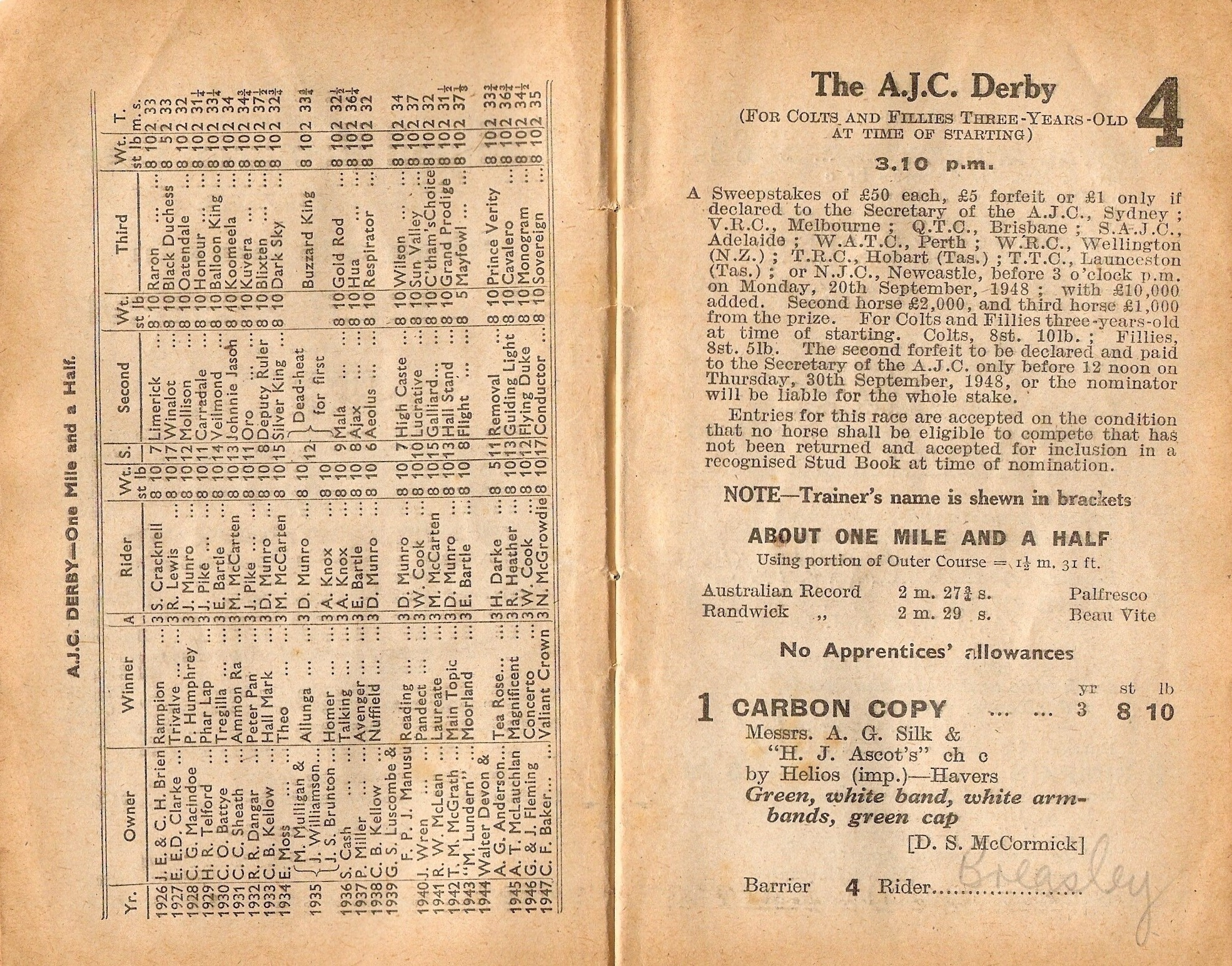
1948 AJC Derby showing the winner, Carbon Copy

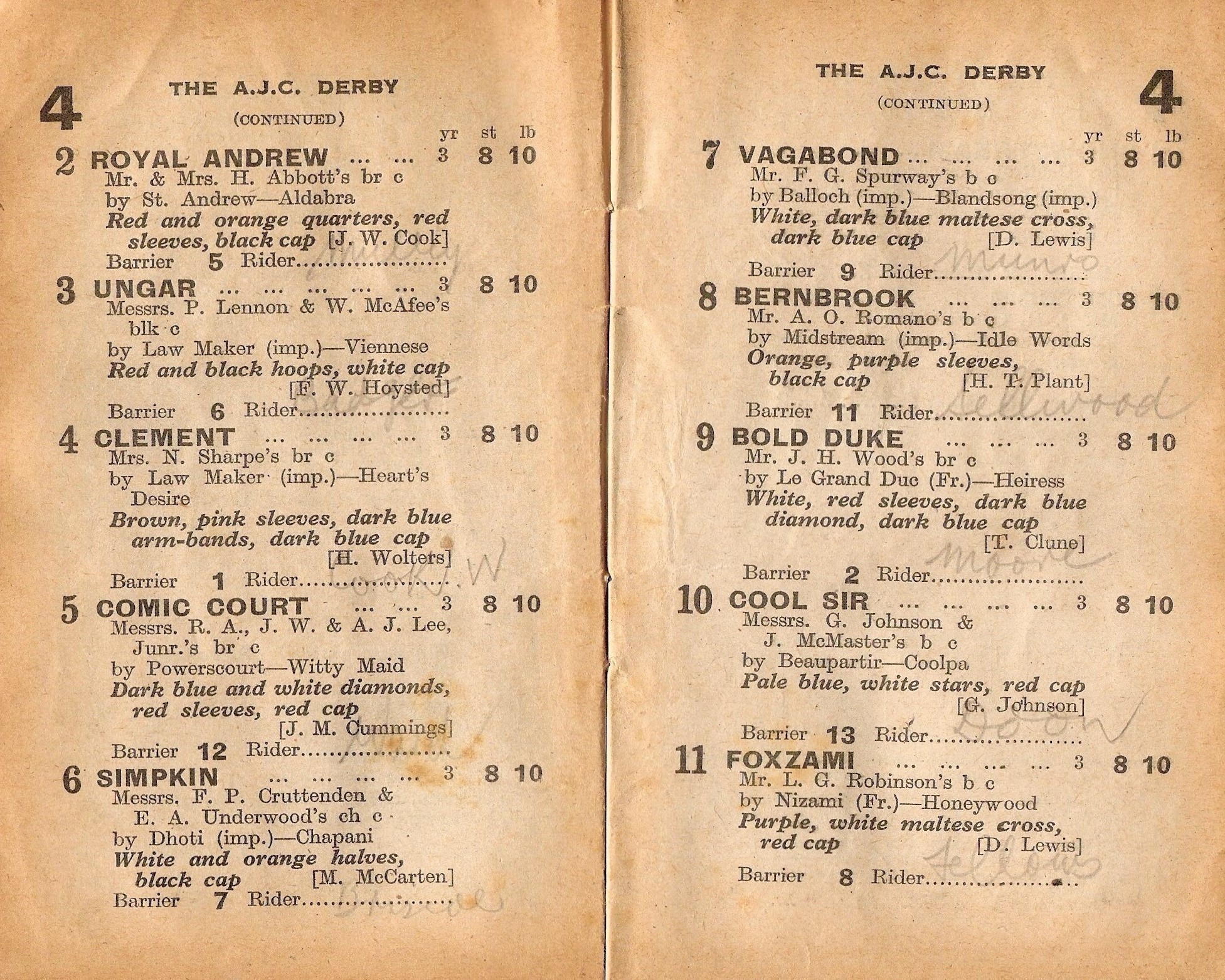
1948 AJC Derby showing starters and results

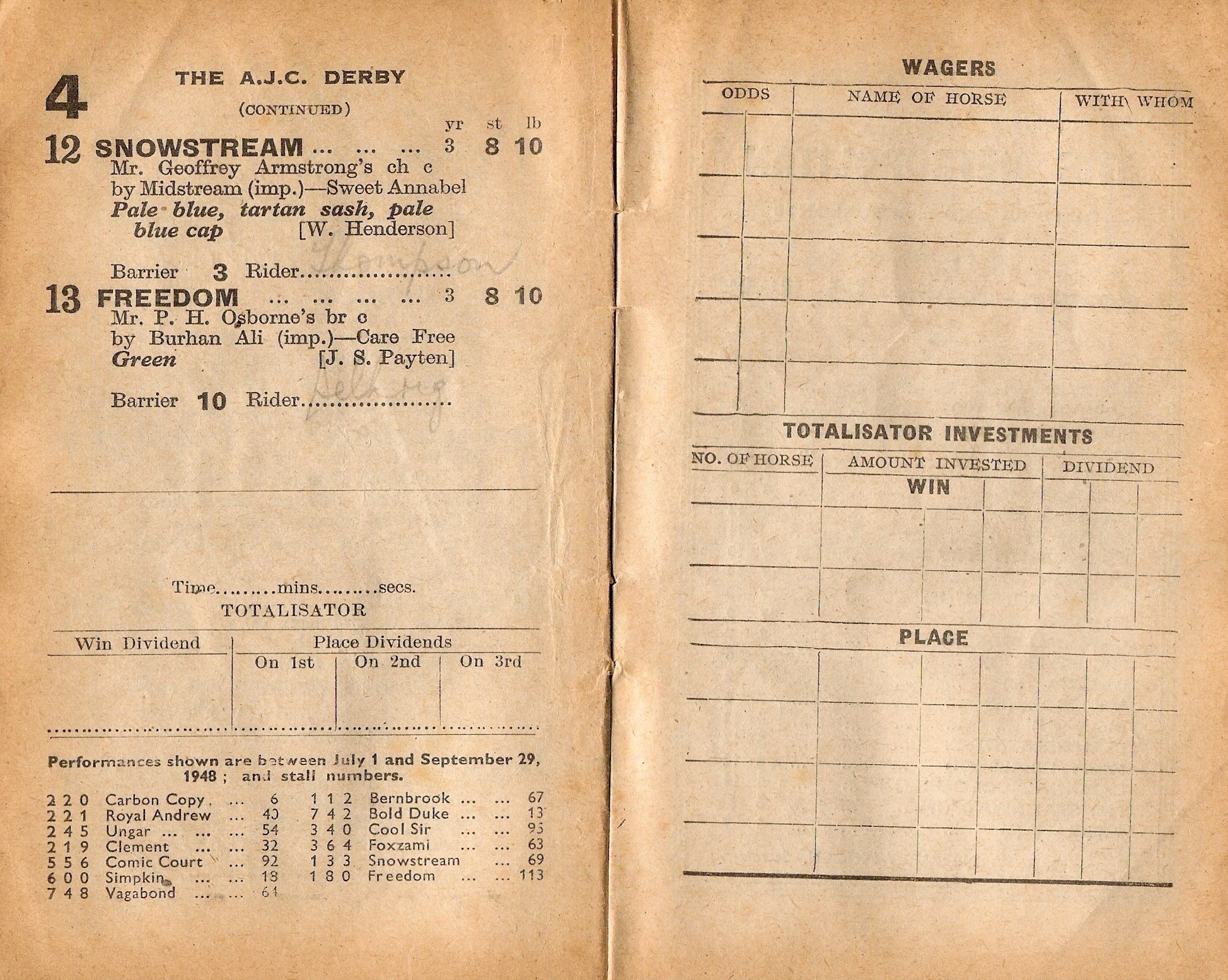
1948 AJC Derby showing starters and results

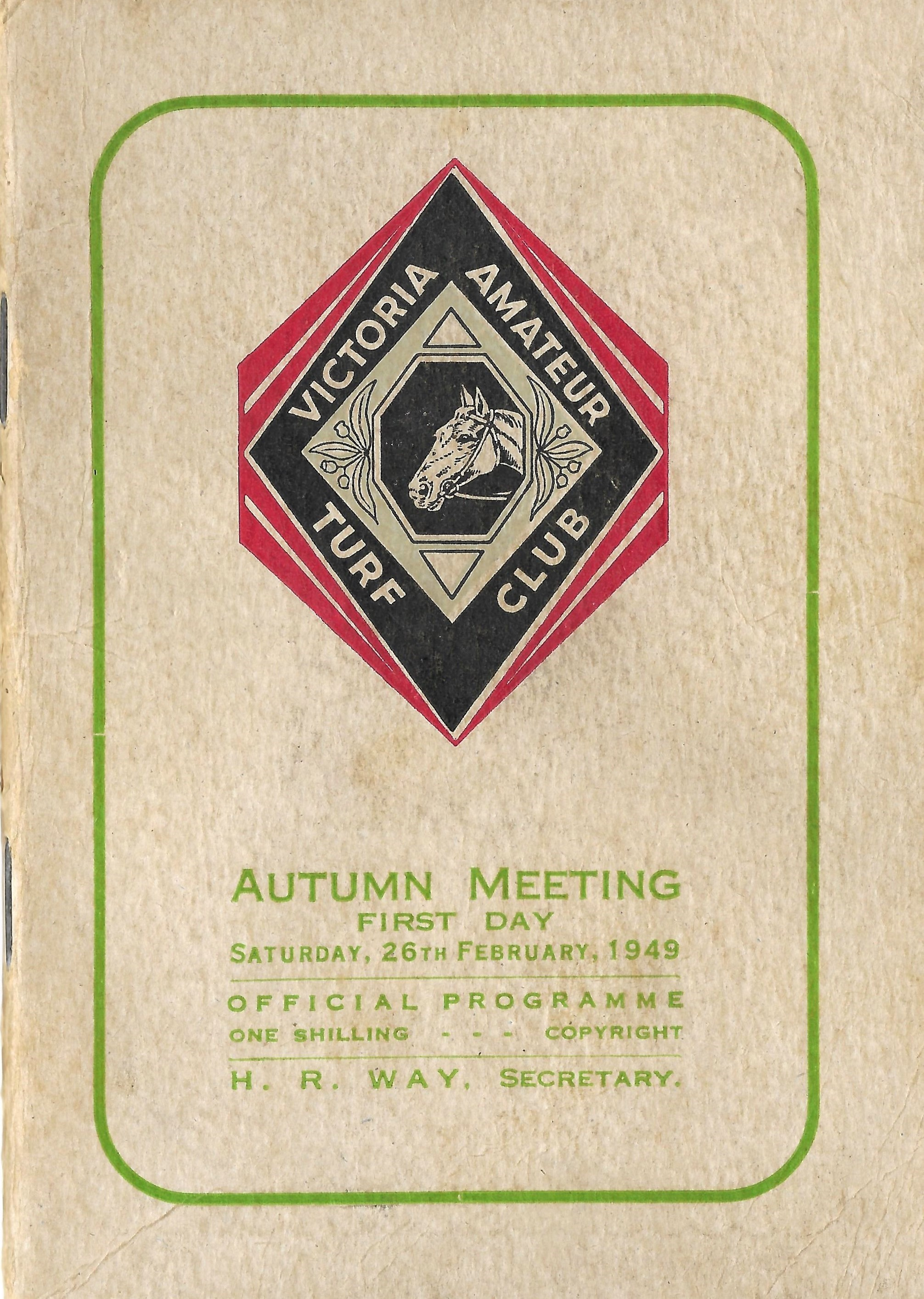
1949 VATC St George Stakes racebook front cover

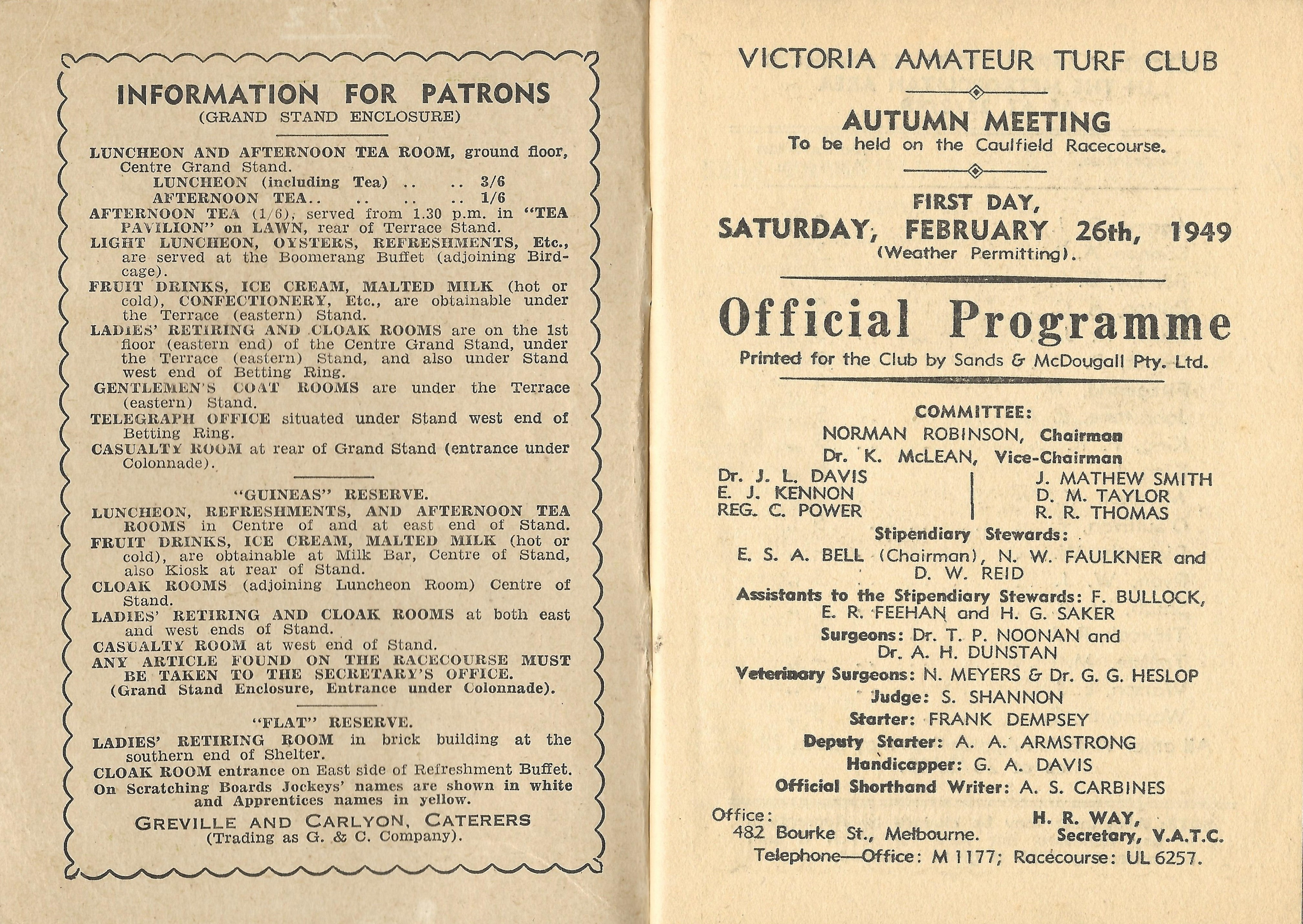
1949 VATC St George Stakes showing raceday officials

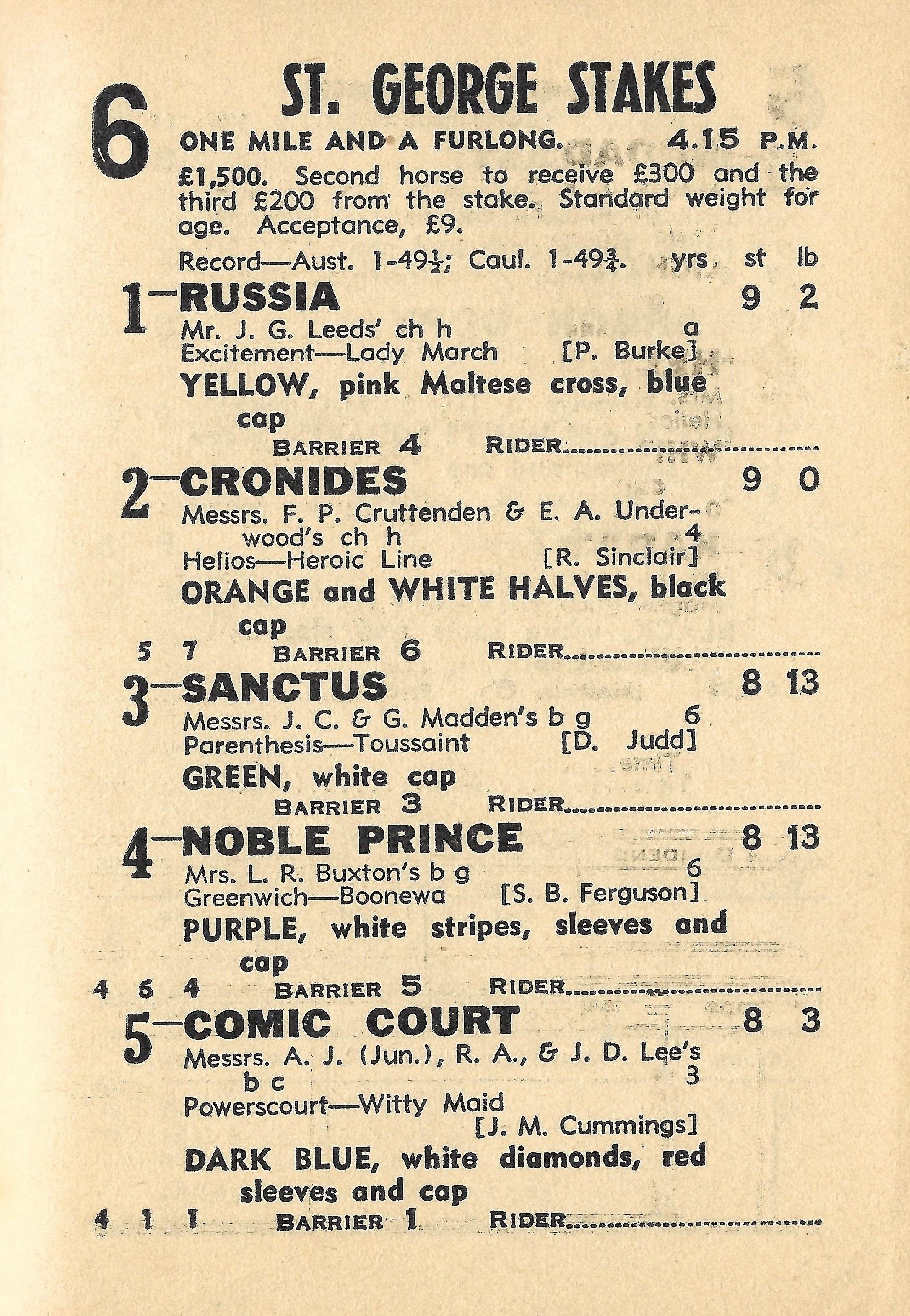
1949 VATC St George Stakes starters and results

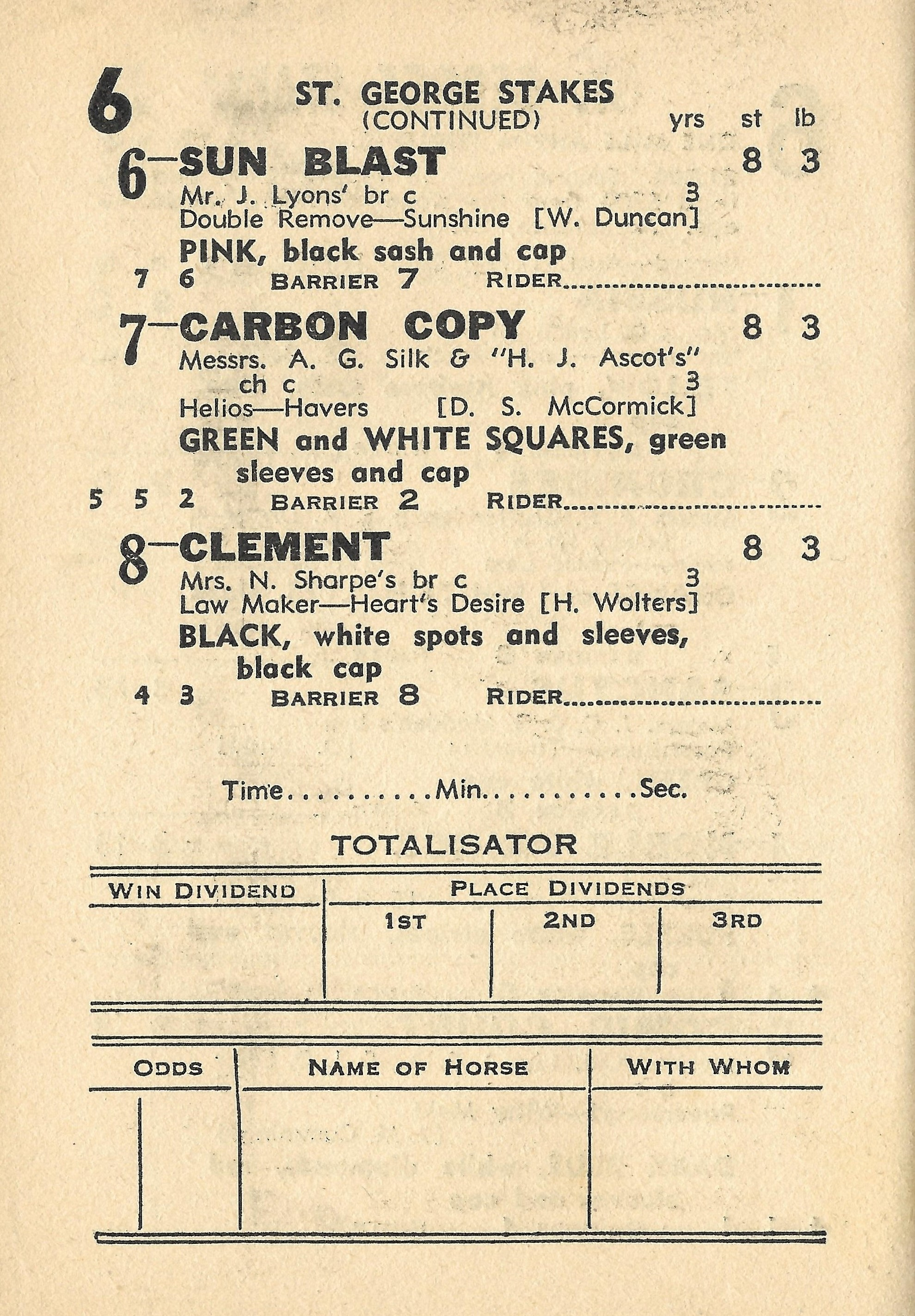
1949 VATC St George Stakes showing the winner, Carbon Copy

=== 1949 racebooks ===
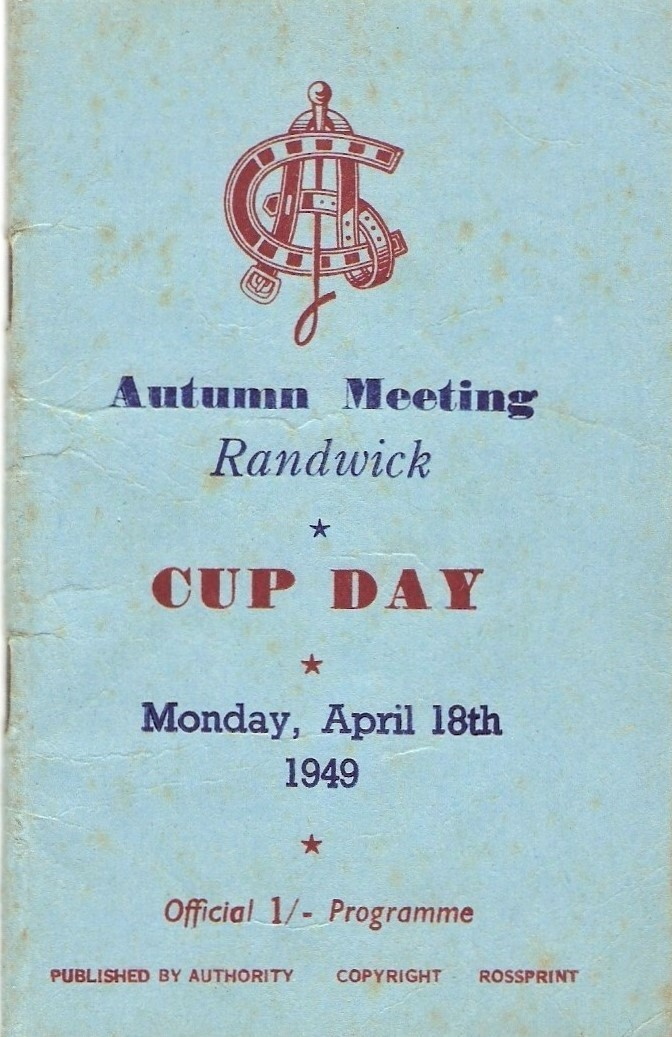
1949 AJC Sydney Cup racebook front cover

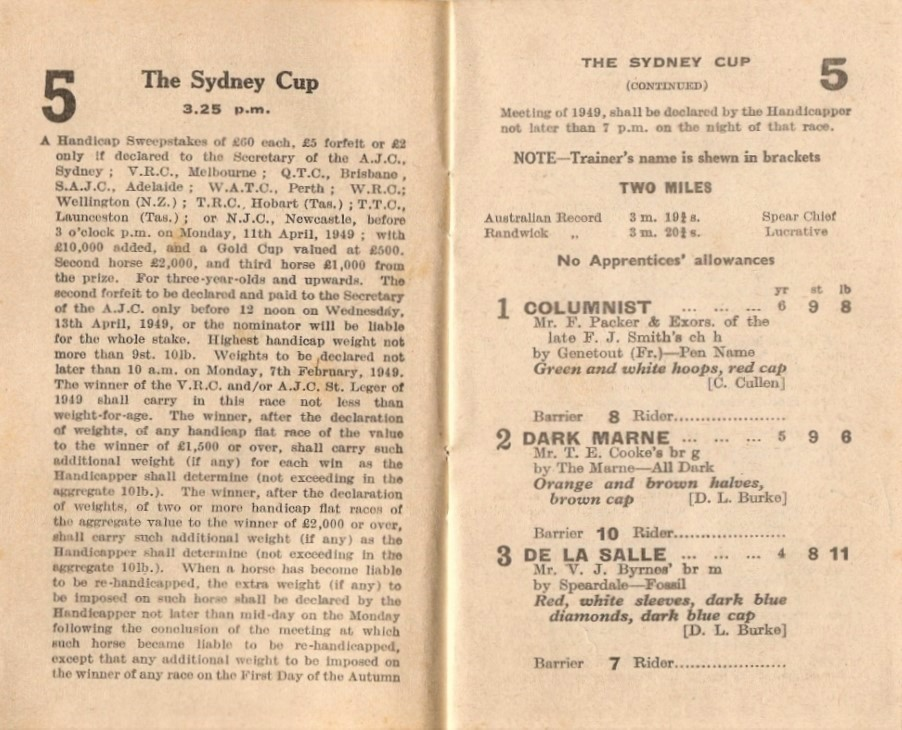
1949 AJC Sydney Cup showing race conditions

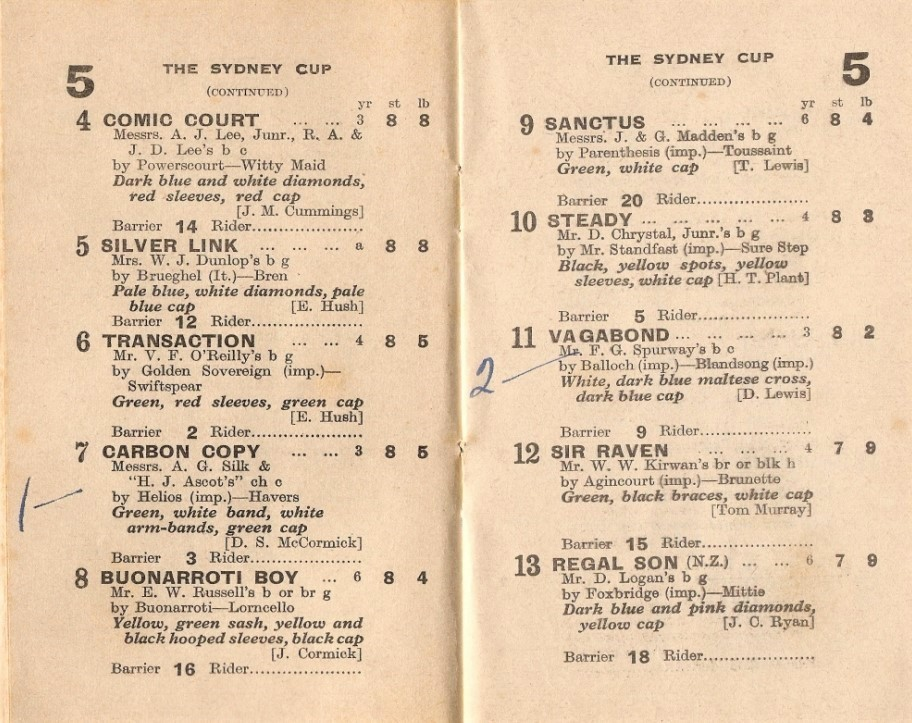
1949 AJC Sydney Cup showing the winner, Carbon Copy

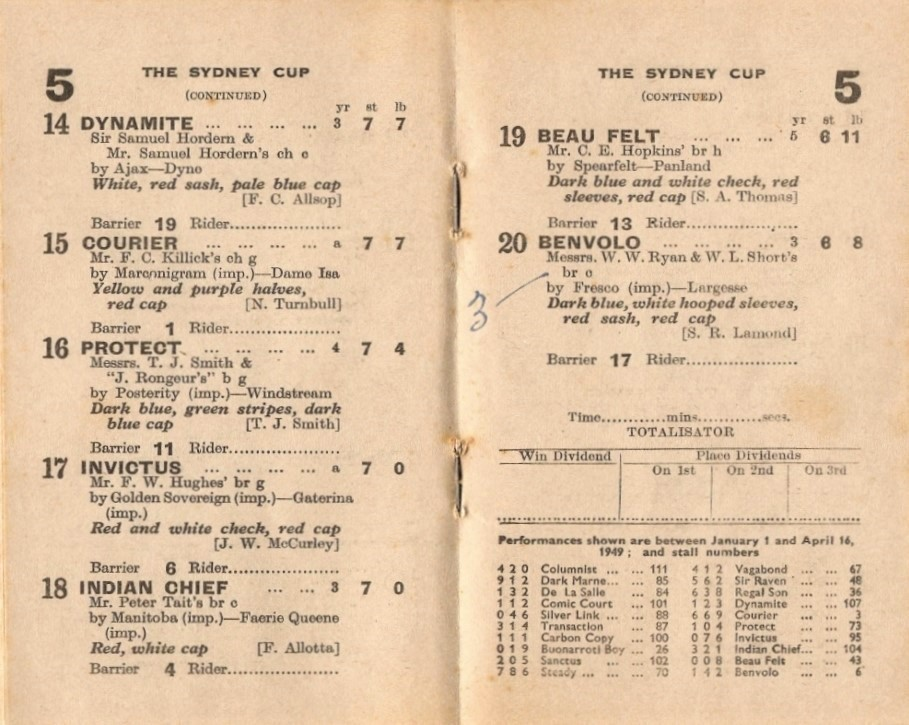
1949 AJC Sydney Cup showing starters and results

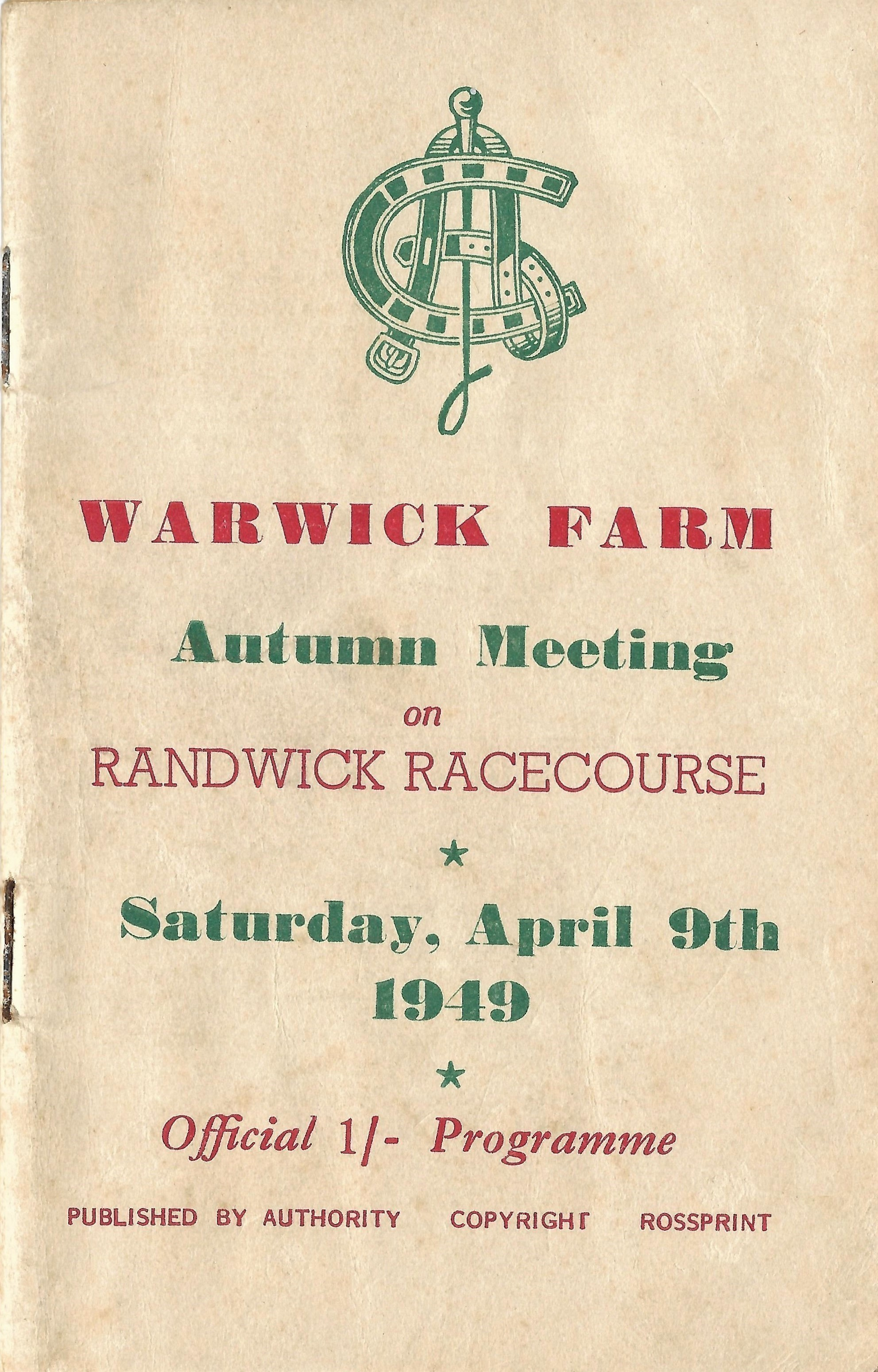
1949 AJC Chipping Norton Stakes racebook front cover

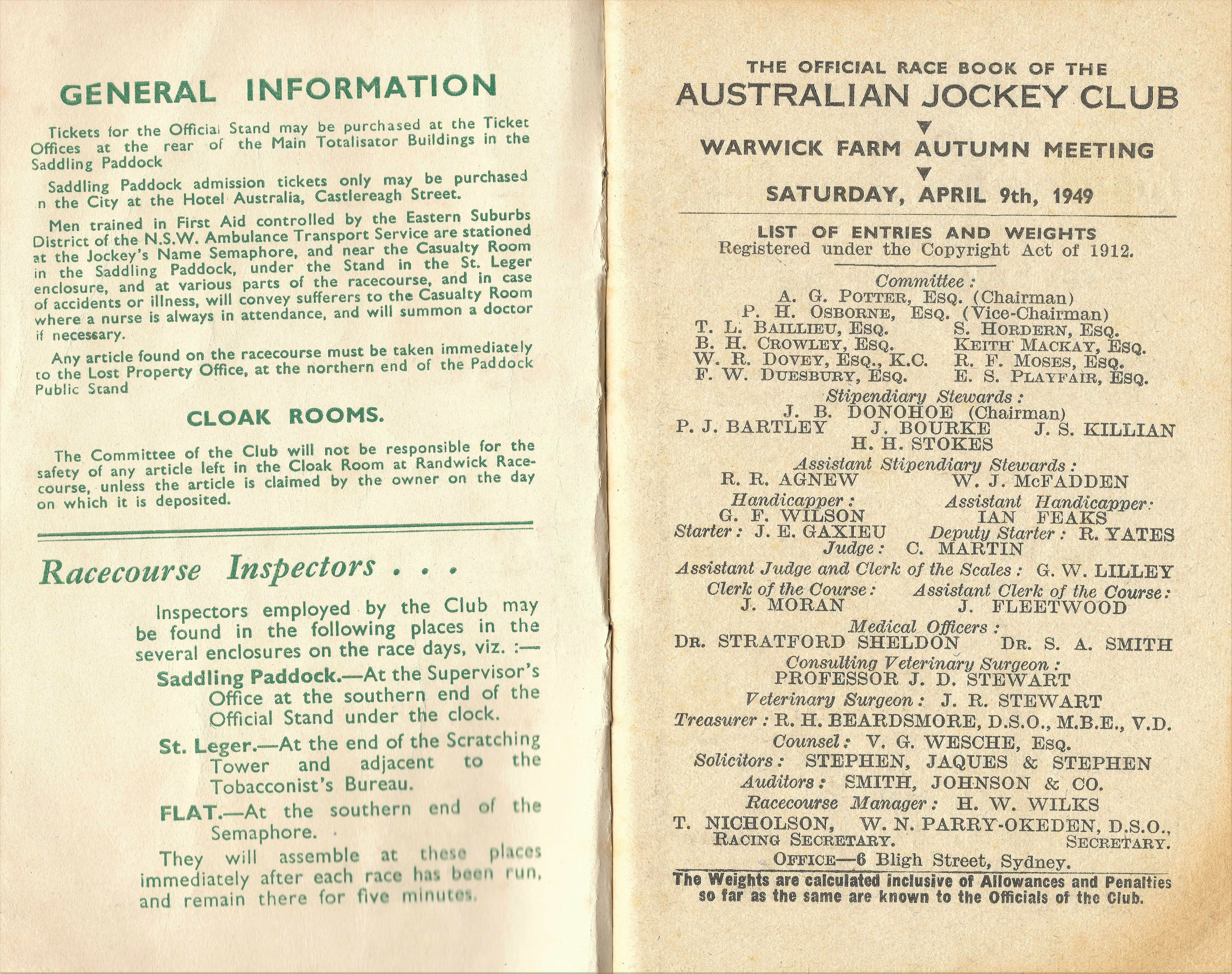
1949 AJC Chipping Norton Stakes showing raceday officials

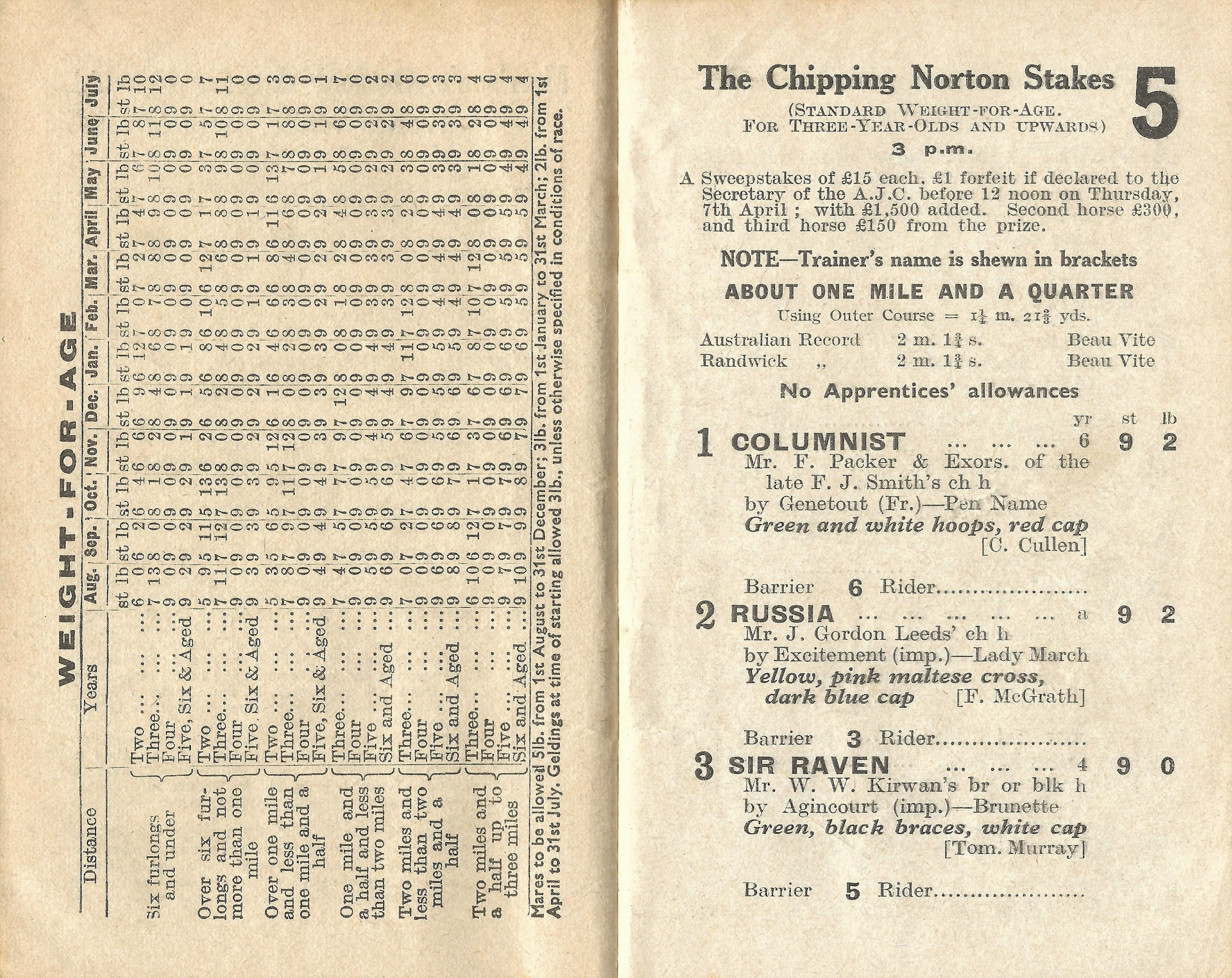
1949 AJC Chipping Norton Stakes starters and results

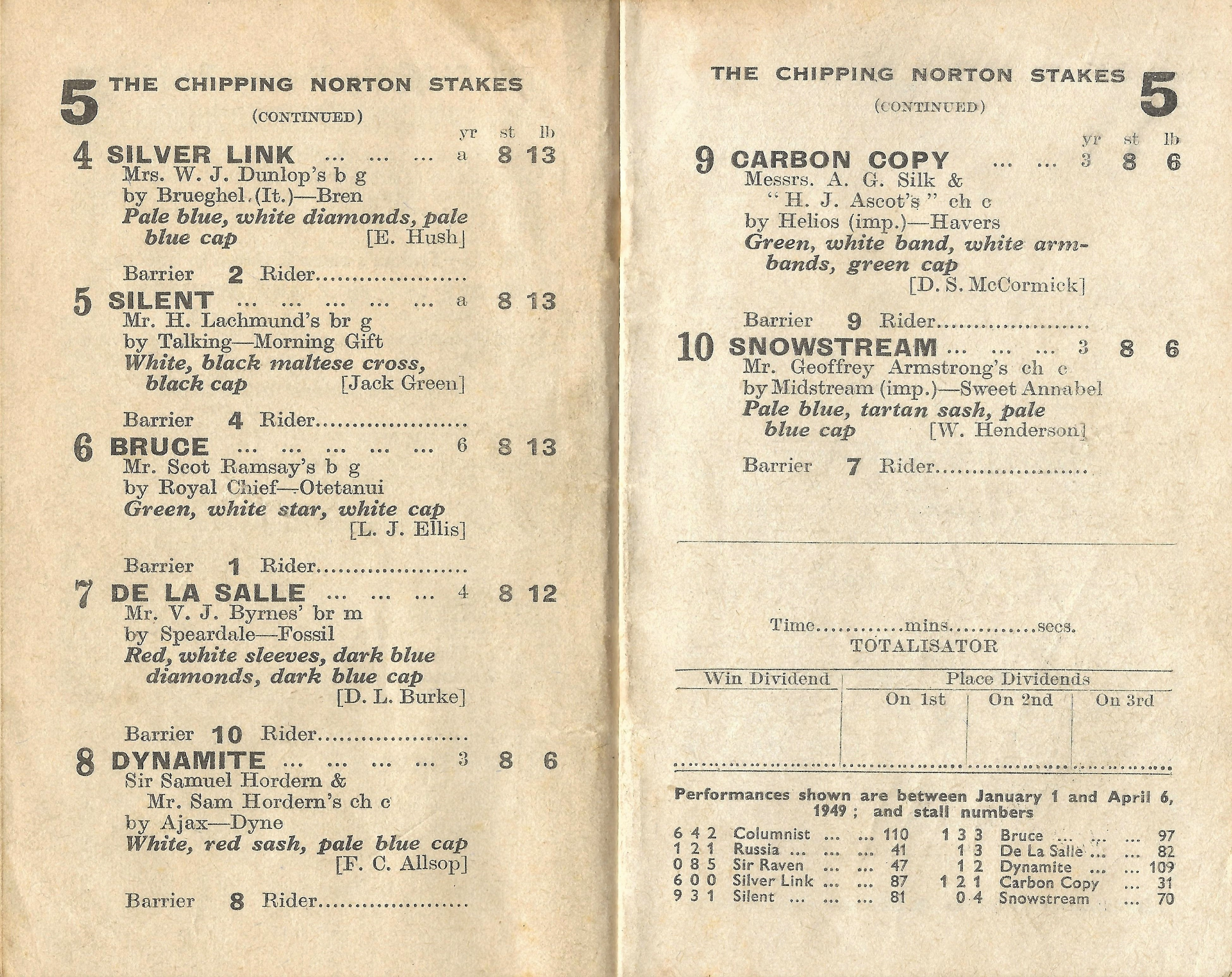
1949 AJC Chipping Norton Stakes showing the winner, Carbon Copy

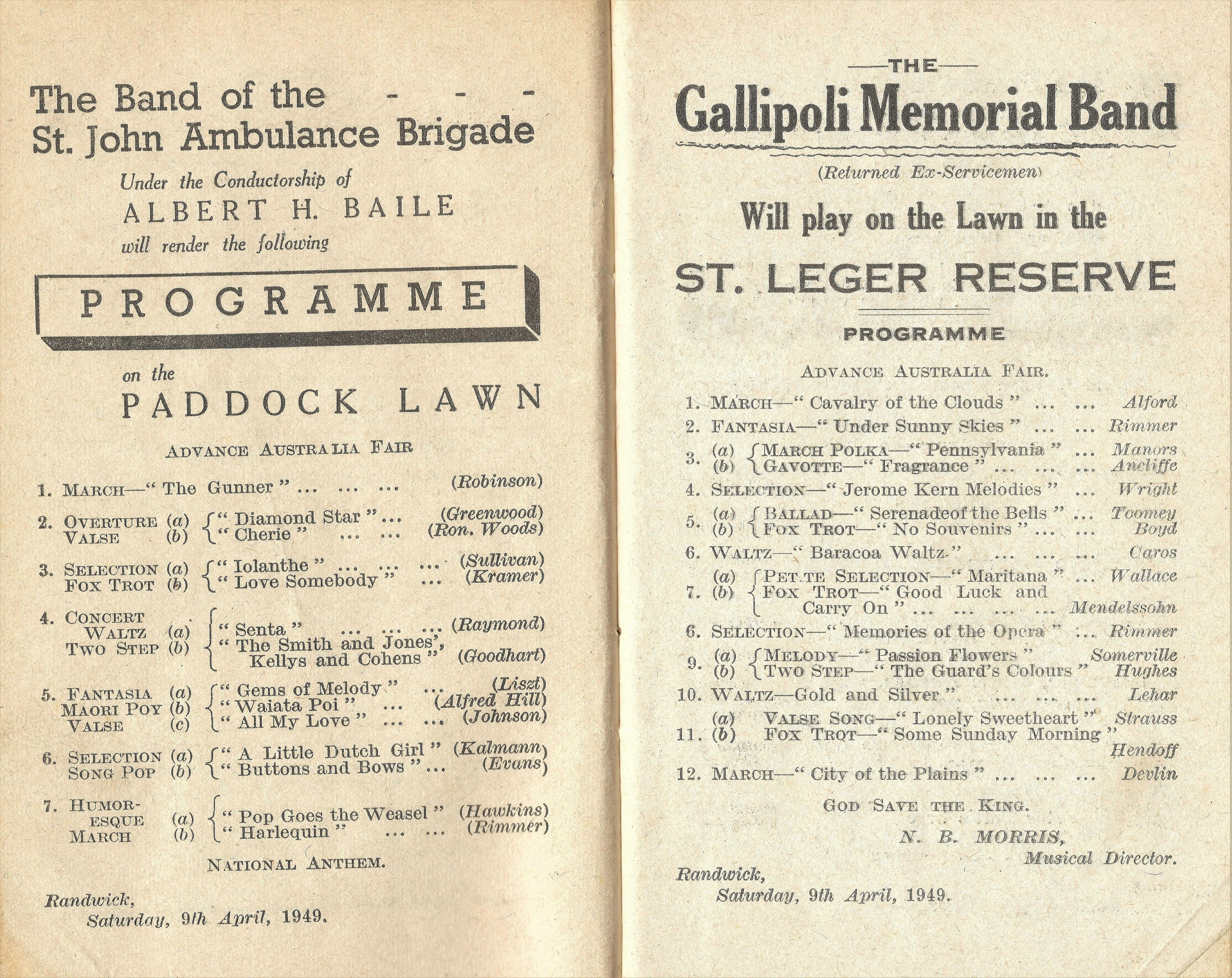
1949 AJC Chipping Norton Stakes showing band entertainment program

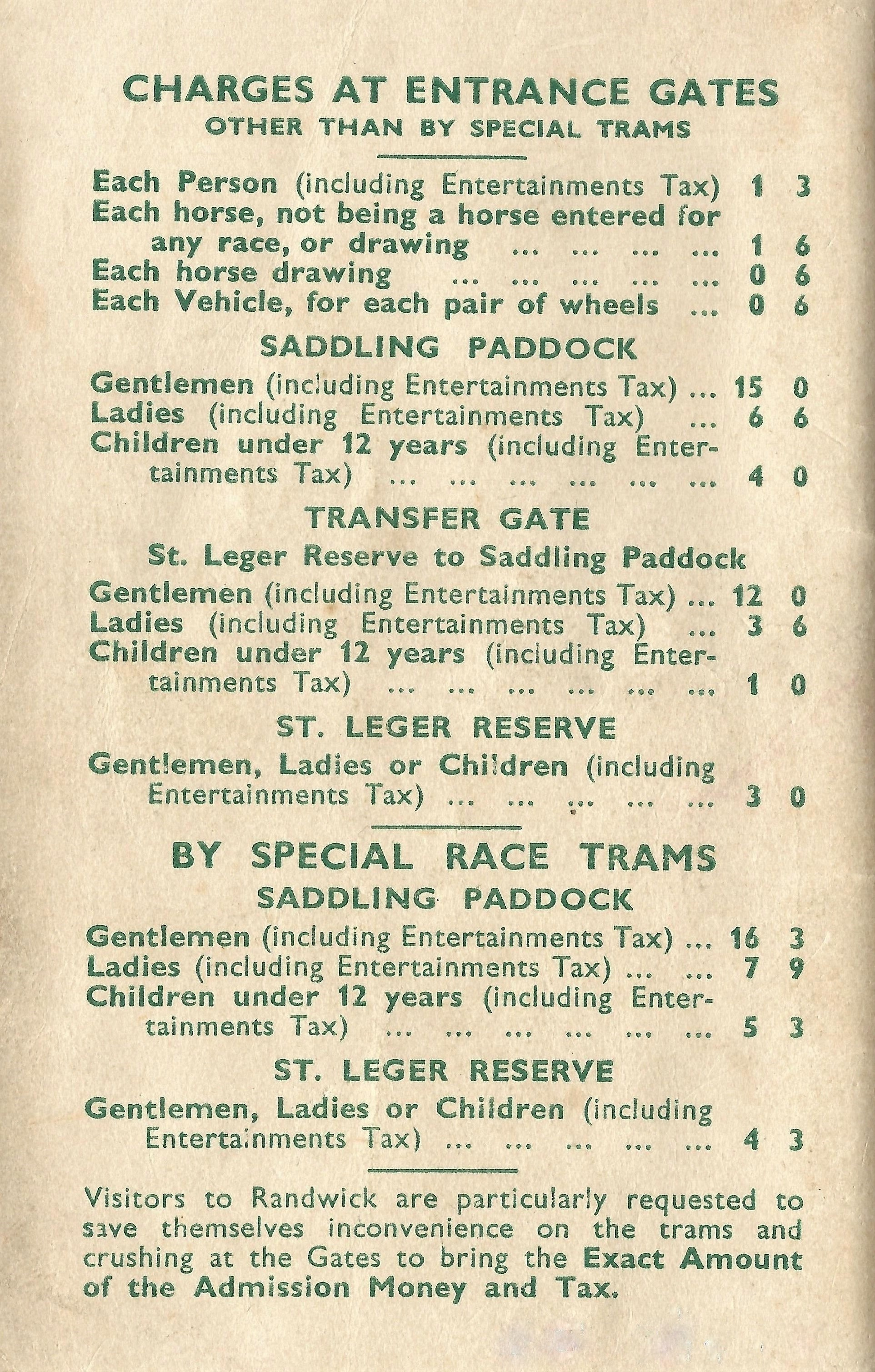
Back cover showing charges at the entrance gates

== Stud career ==
Grand Print was one of the famous foals from Carbon Copy, having won the 1962 Sydney Cup and 1964 Australian Cup..
