= Chipping Norton Stakes =

Horse race in Sydney, Australia

Verry Elleegant Stakes
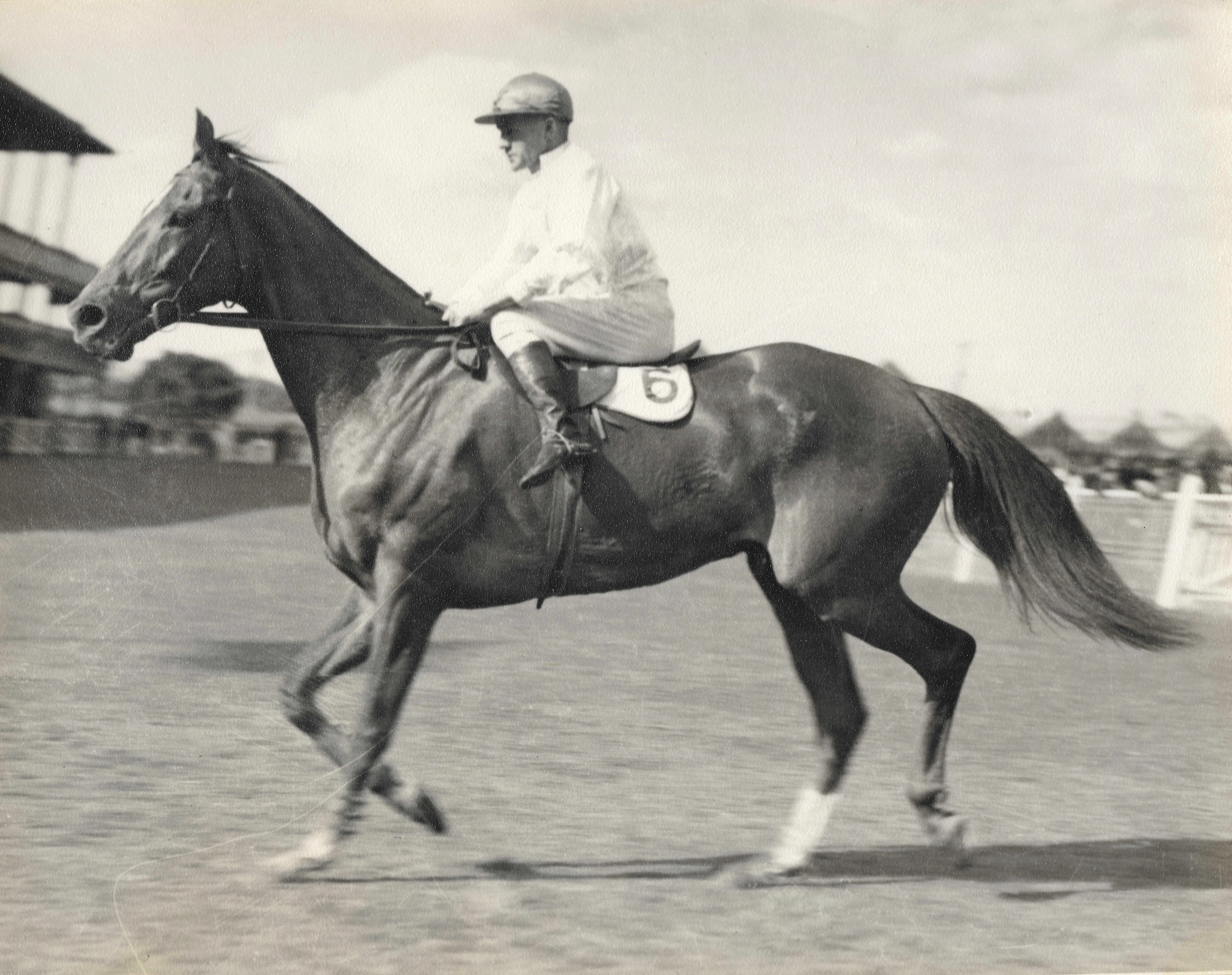
- Lough Neagh, 1933, 1936 and 1937 winner
- Class: Group I
- Location: Randwick Racecourse, Sydney, Australia
- Inaugurated: 1925
- Race type: Thoroughbred – Flat racing
- Sponsor: TAB (2017-26)

Race information
- Distance: 1,600 metres
- Surface: Turf
- Track: Right-handed
- Qualification: Three years old and older
- Weight: Weight for Age
- Purse: A$1,000,000 (2026)
- Bonuses: exempt from ballot for Doncaster Handicap and Sydney Cup

The Verry Elleegant Stakes, registered as the Chipping Norton Stakes is an Australian Turf Club Group 1 Thoroughbred horse race for horses three years old and older, run at weight for age, over a distance of 1600 metres at Randwick Racecourse, Sydney, Australia, in February or March.

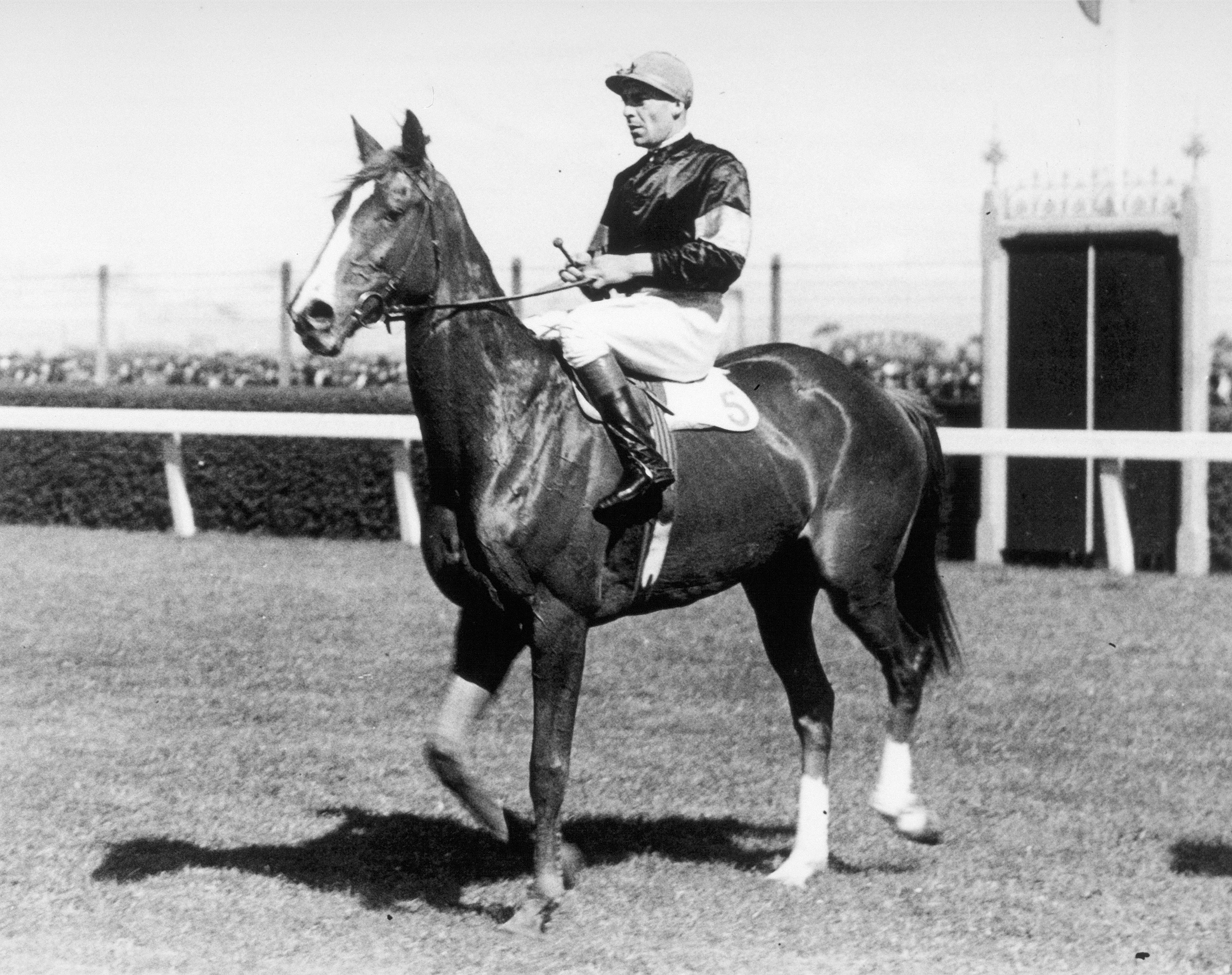
Rogilla, 1935 winner

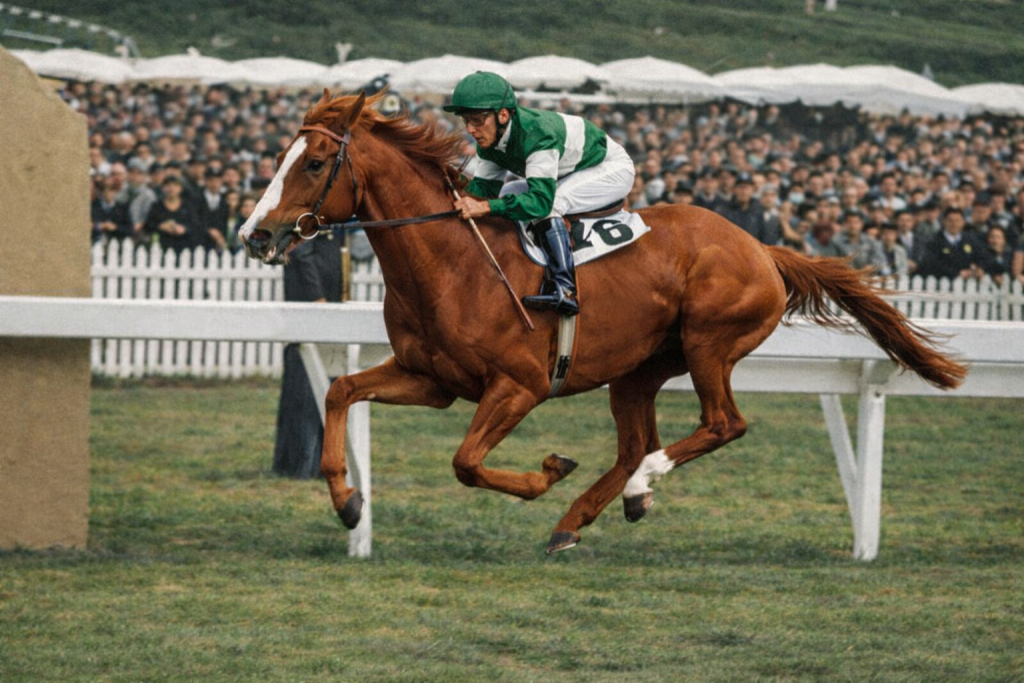
Carbon Copy, 1949 & 1950 winner

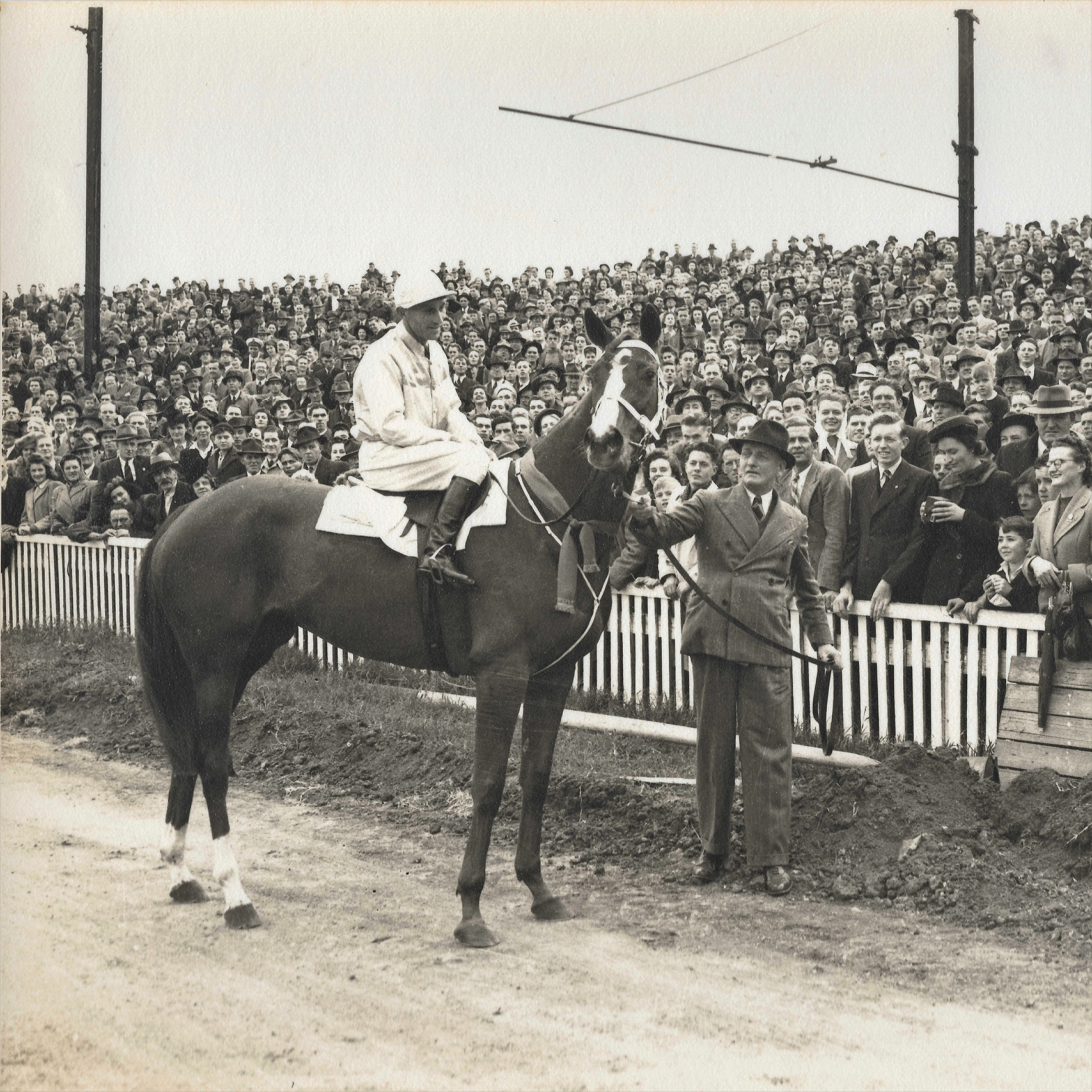
Tranquil Star, 1941 winner

== History ==
The race is a major preparatory race for the Group 1 Doncaster Handicap and Sydney Cup as the winner is exempt from ballot for entry into each race.

The race is named after the suburb Chipping Norton located in Liverpool located 27 kilometres south-west of Sydney. The race is usually held together with the Liverpool City Cup as part of the City of Liverpool festivities.

Some outstanding champions have won this race including Phar Lap, Tranquil Star, Bernborough and Tulloch and Super Impose.

Tie the Knot won the race four consecutive times, a feat matched by Winx in March 2019.

== 1949 racebook ==
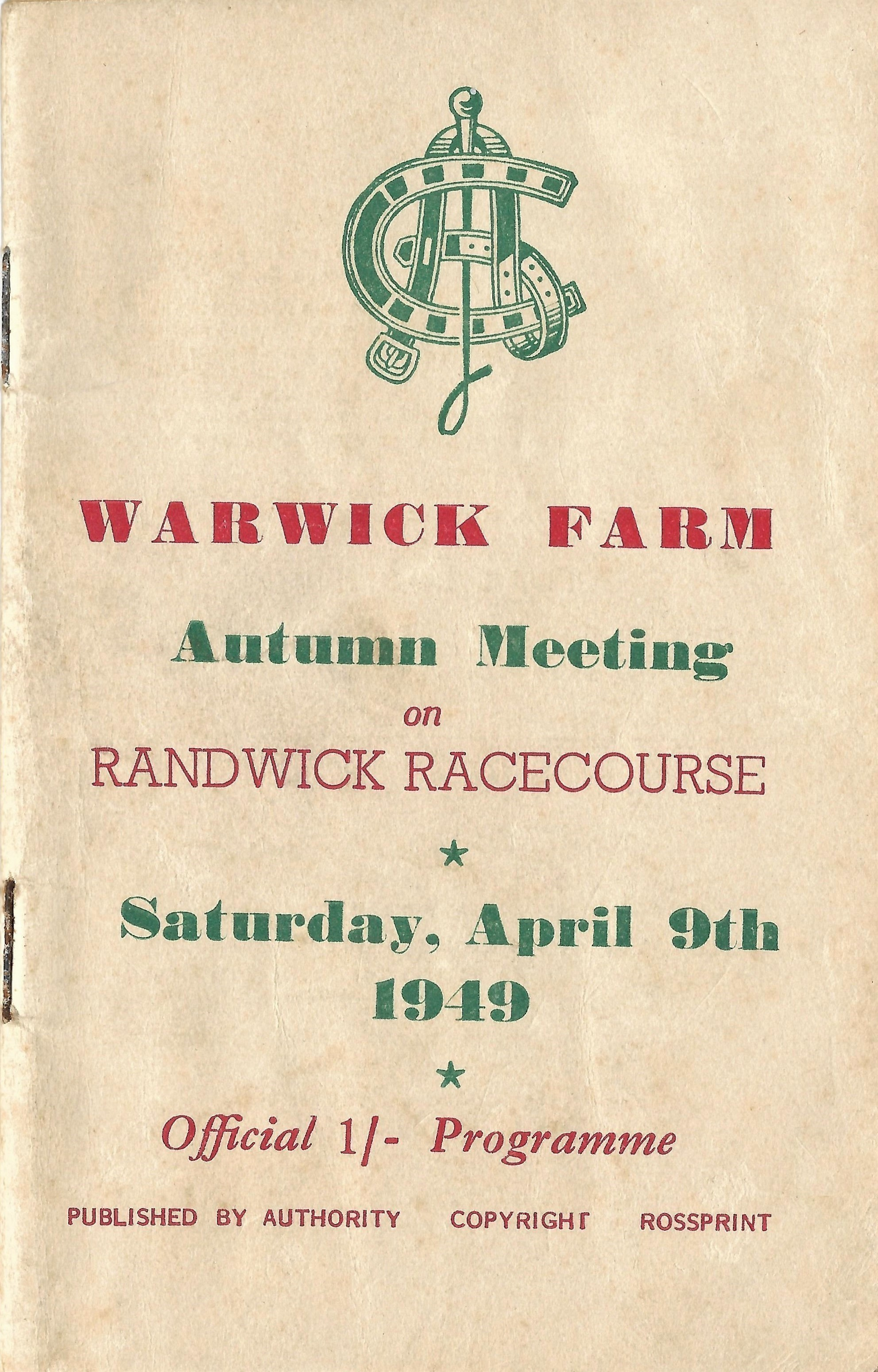
1949 AJC Chipping Norton Stakes racebook front cover

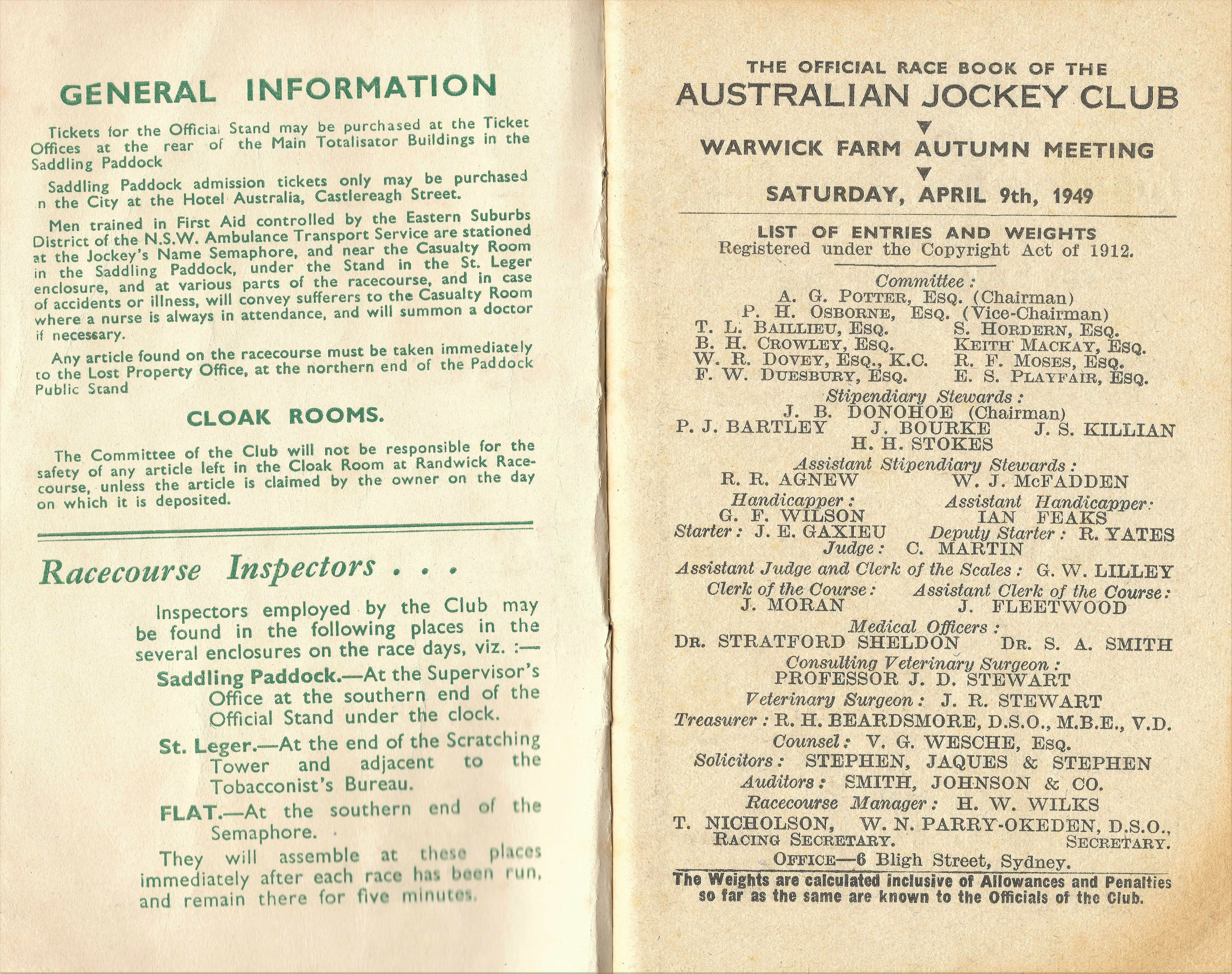
1949 AJC Chipping Norton Stakes showing raceday officials

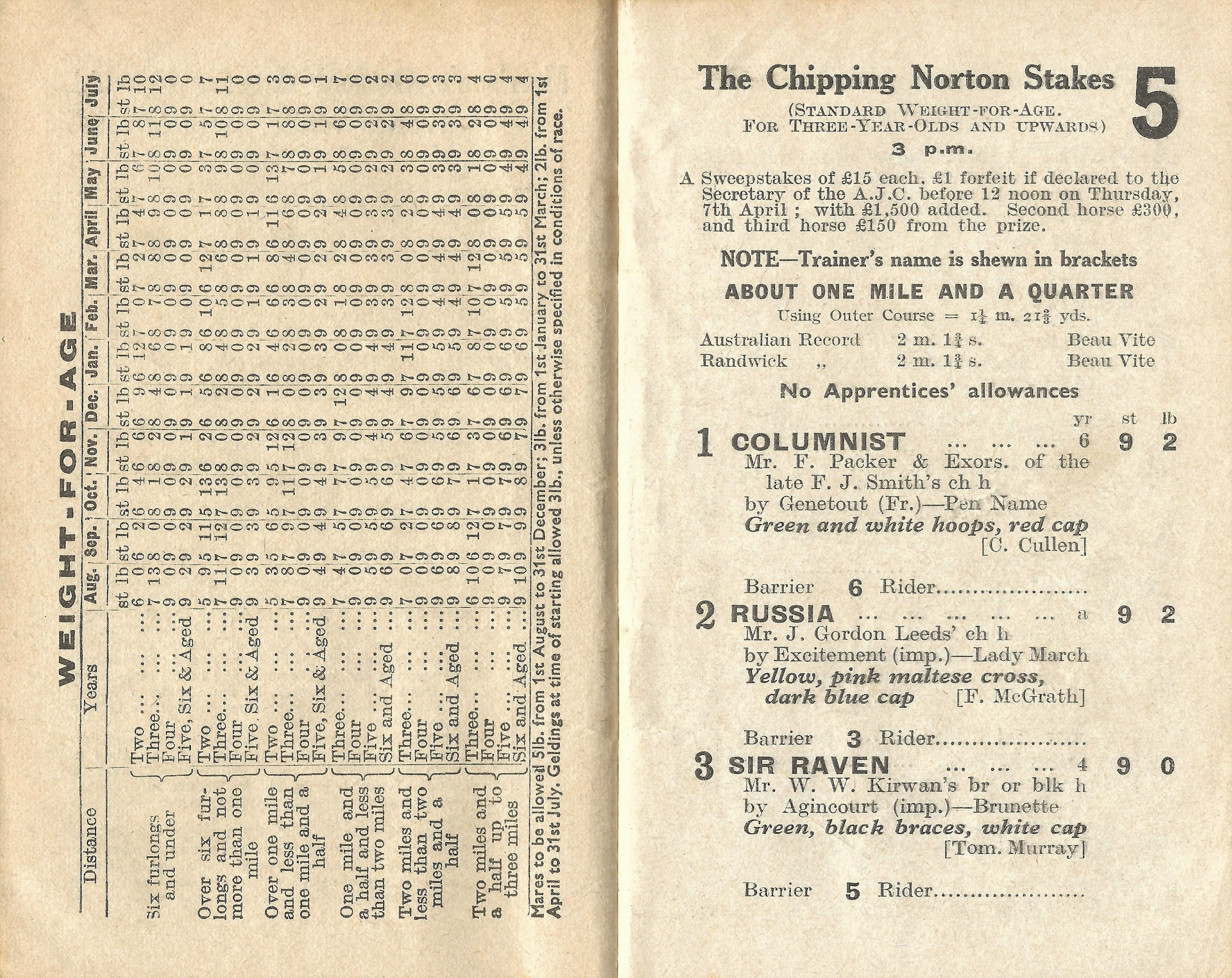
1949 AJC Chipping Norton Stakes starters and results

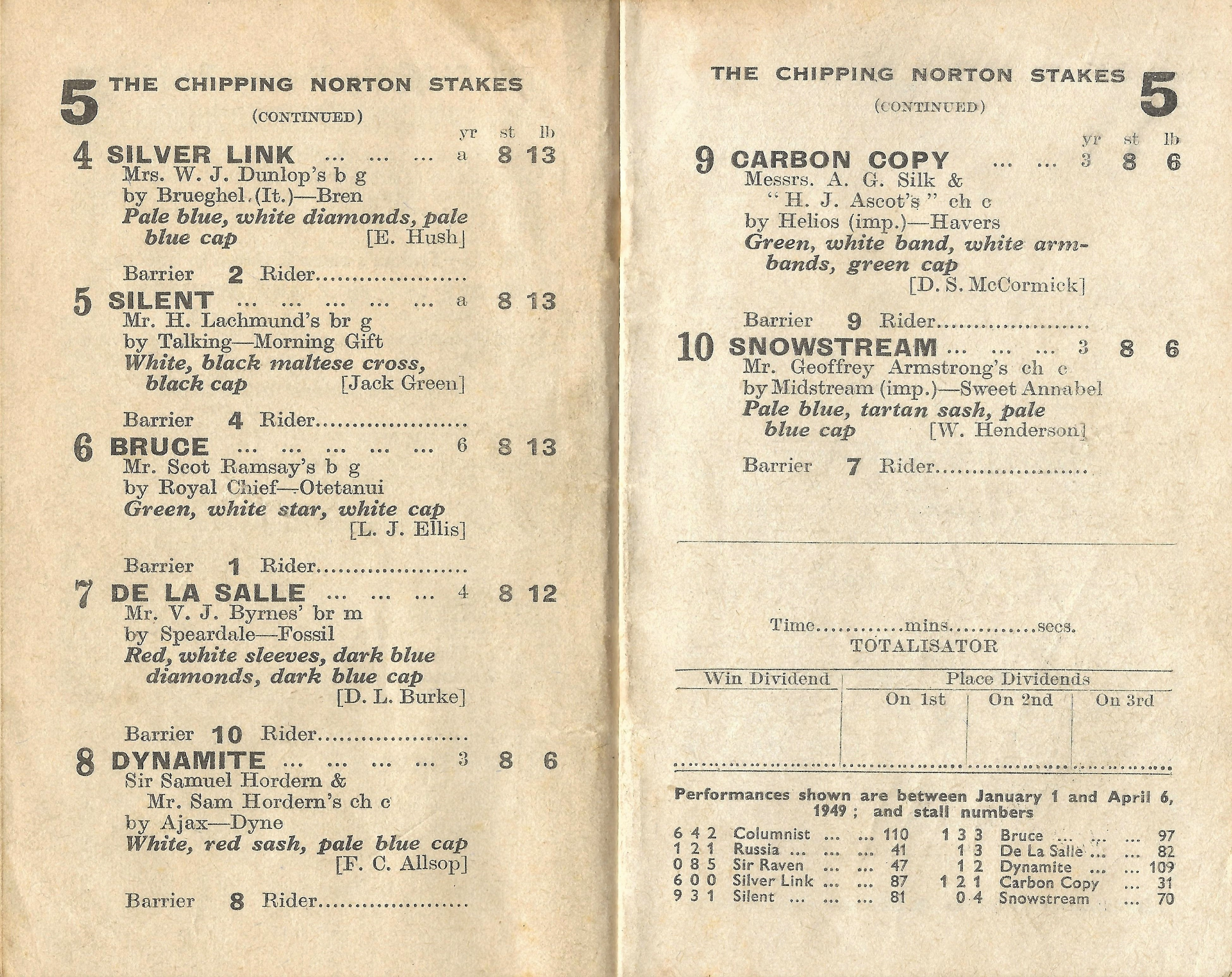
1949 AJC Chipping Norton Stakes showing the winner, Carbon Copy

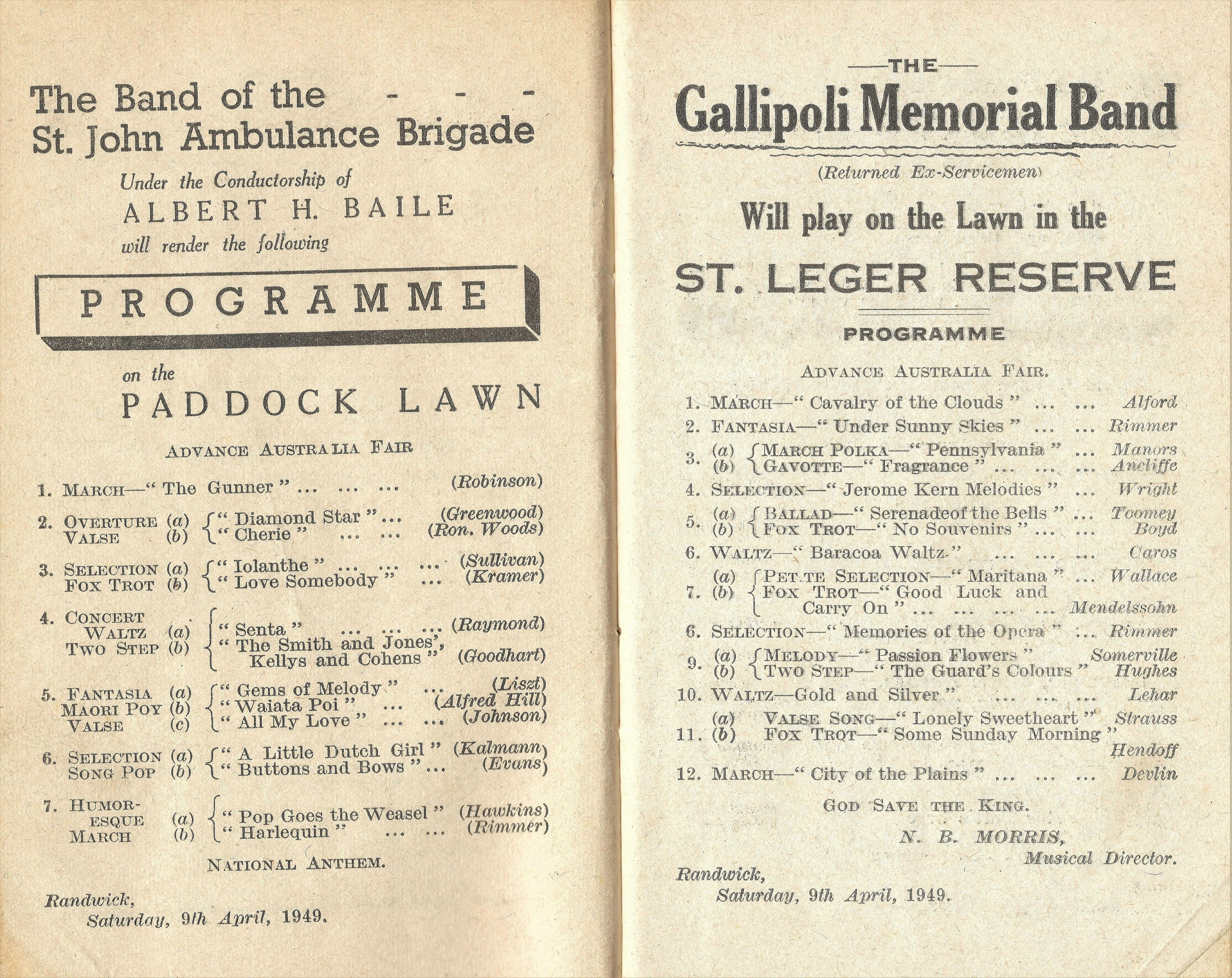
1949 AJC Chipping Norton Stakes showing entertainment program

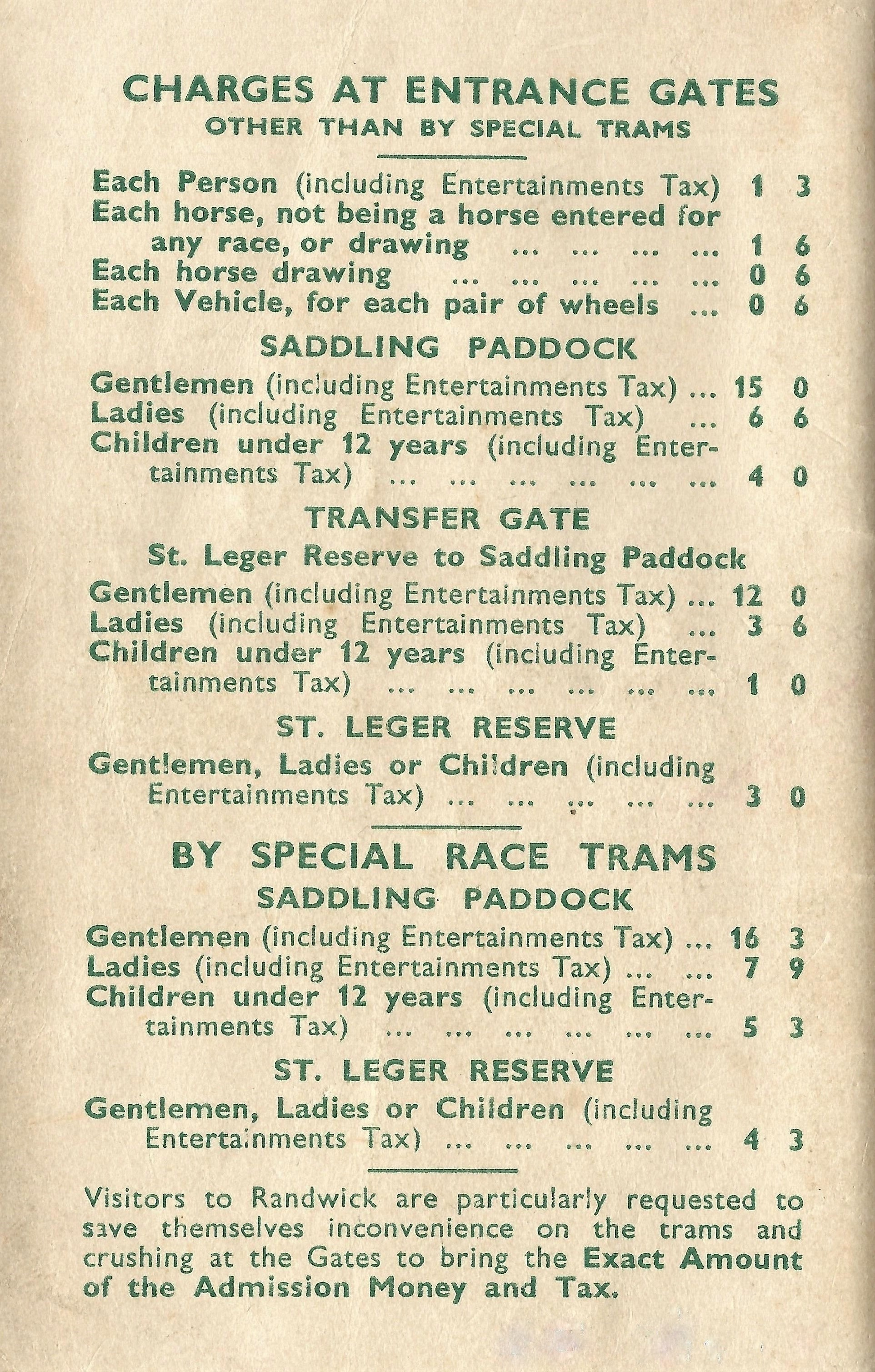
Back cover showing charges at the entrance gates

=== Distance ===
- 1925–1972: 1 1/4 miles (2012 metres)
- 1972–1979: 2100 metres
- 1980 onwards: 1600 metres

=== Grade ===
- 1925–1979 - Principal race
- 1980–1985 - Group 2
- 1986 onwards - Group 1 race

=== Venue ===
- From 1939 due to World War II and after until 1952 the event was held at Randwick Racecourse.
- 1979–1991 - Warwick Farm Racecourse
- 1992 - Randwick Racecourse
- 1993–2000 - Warwick Farm Racecourse
- 2001 - Randwick Racecourse
- 2002–2007 - Warwick Farm Racecourse
- 2008–2009 - Randwick Racecourse
- 2010–2015 - Warwick Farm Racecourse
- 2016 onwards - Randwick Racecourse

=== Gallery of noted winners ===
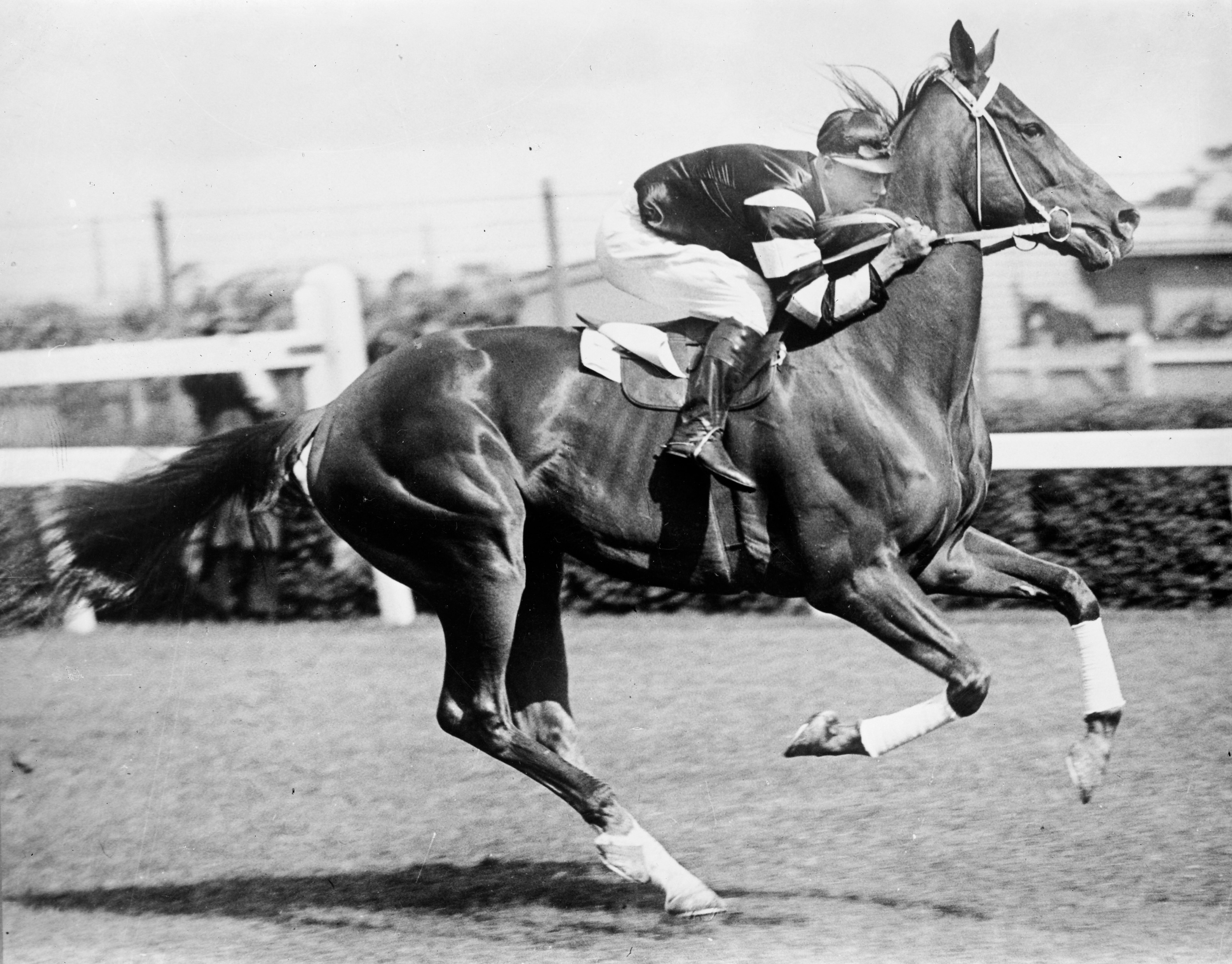
Phar Lap, 1930 winner

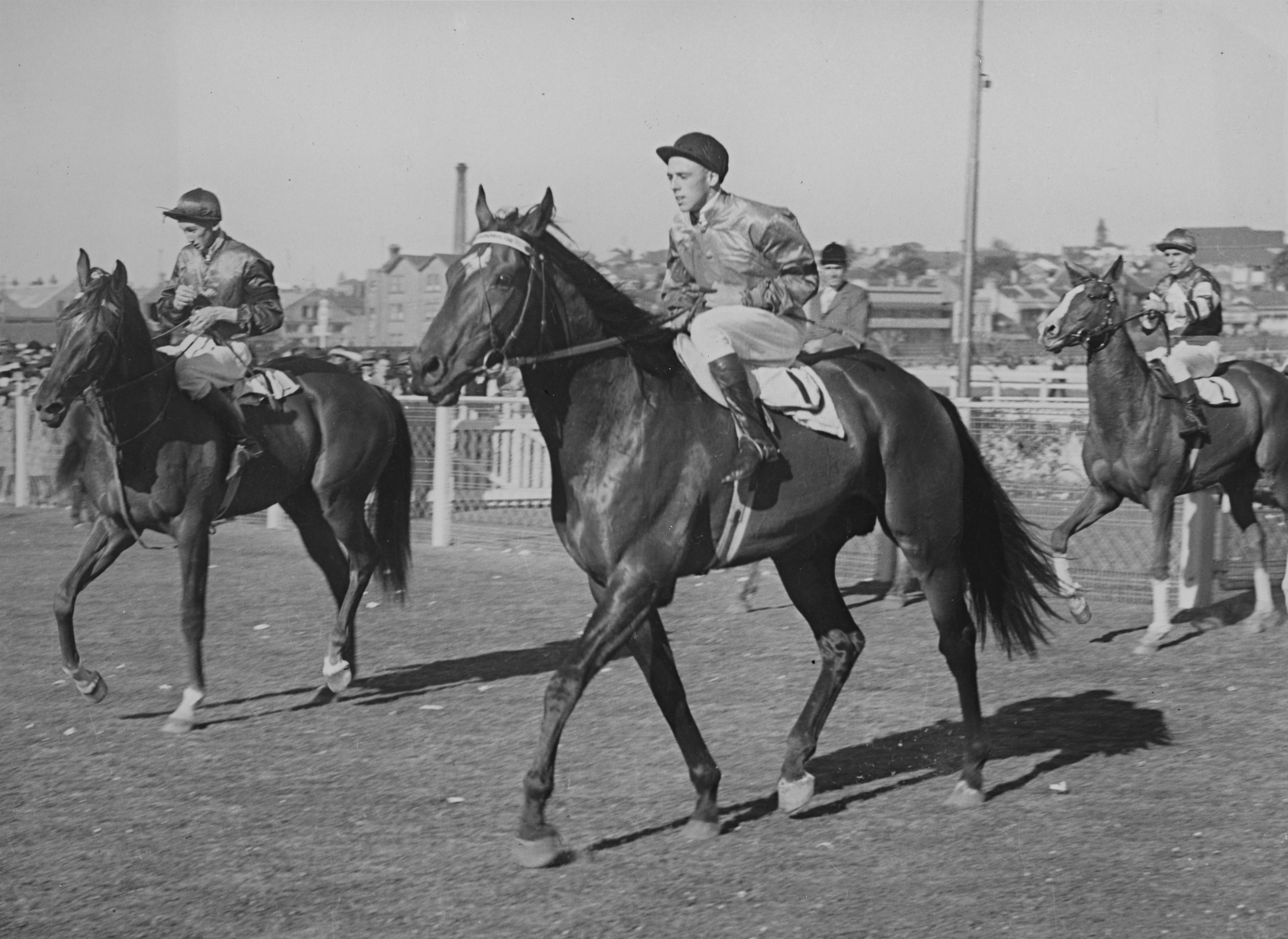
Bernborough, 1946 winner

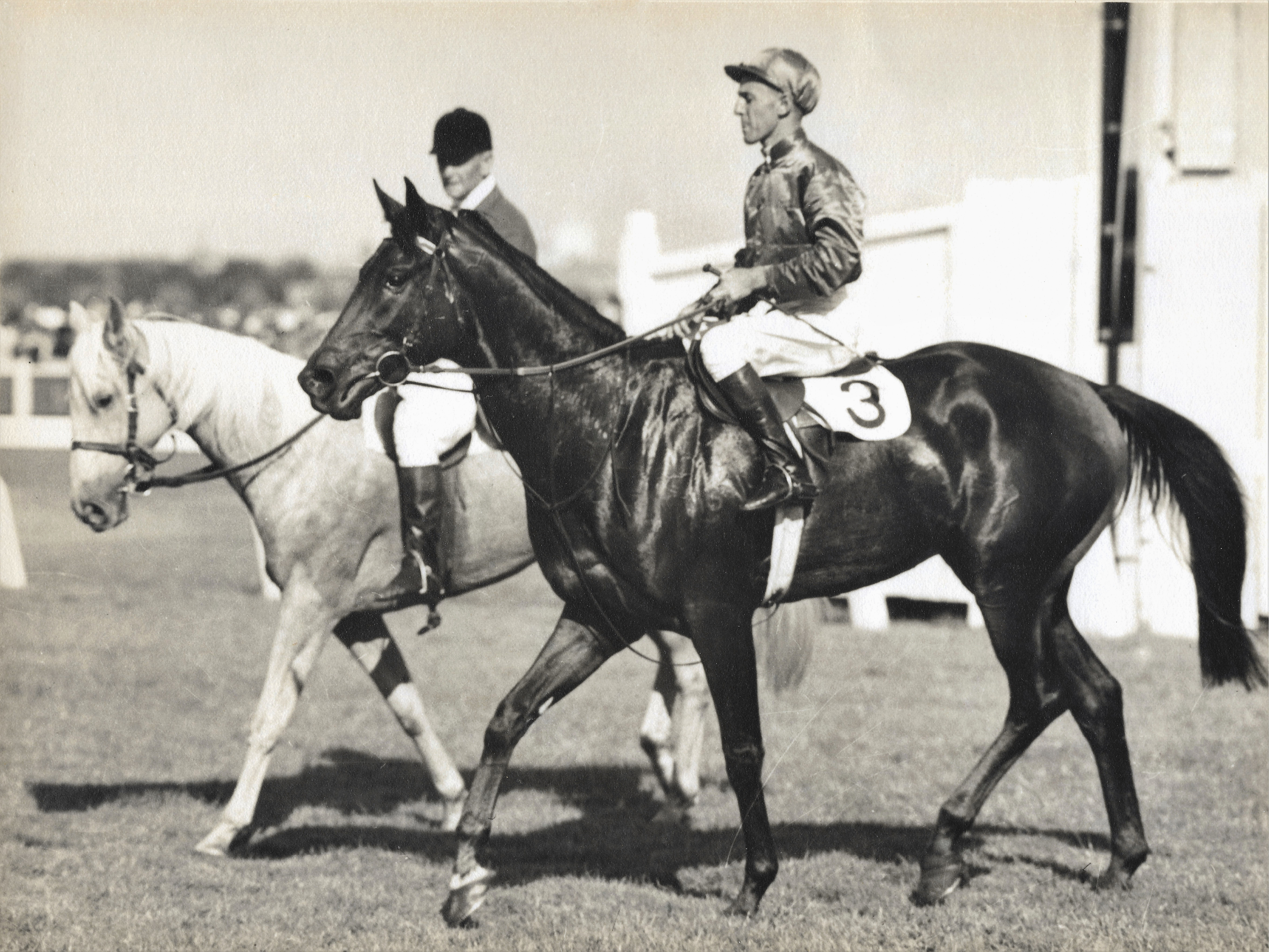
Delta, 1952 winner

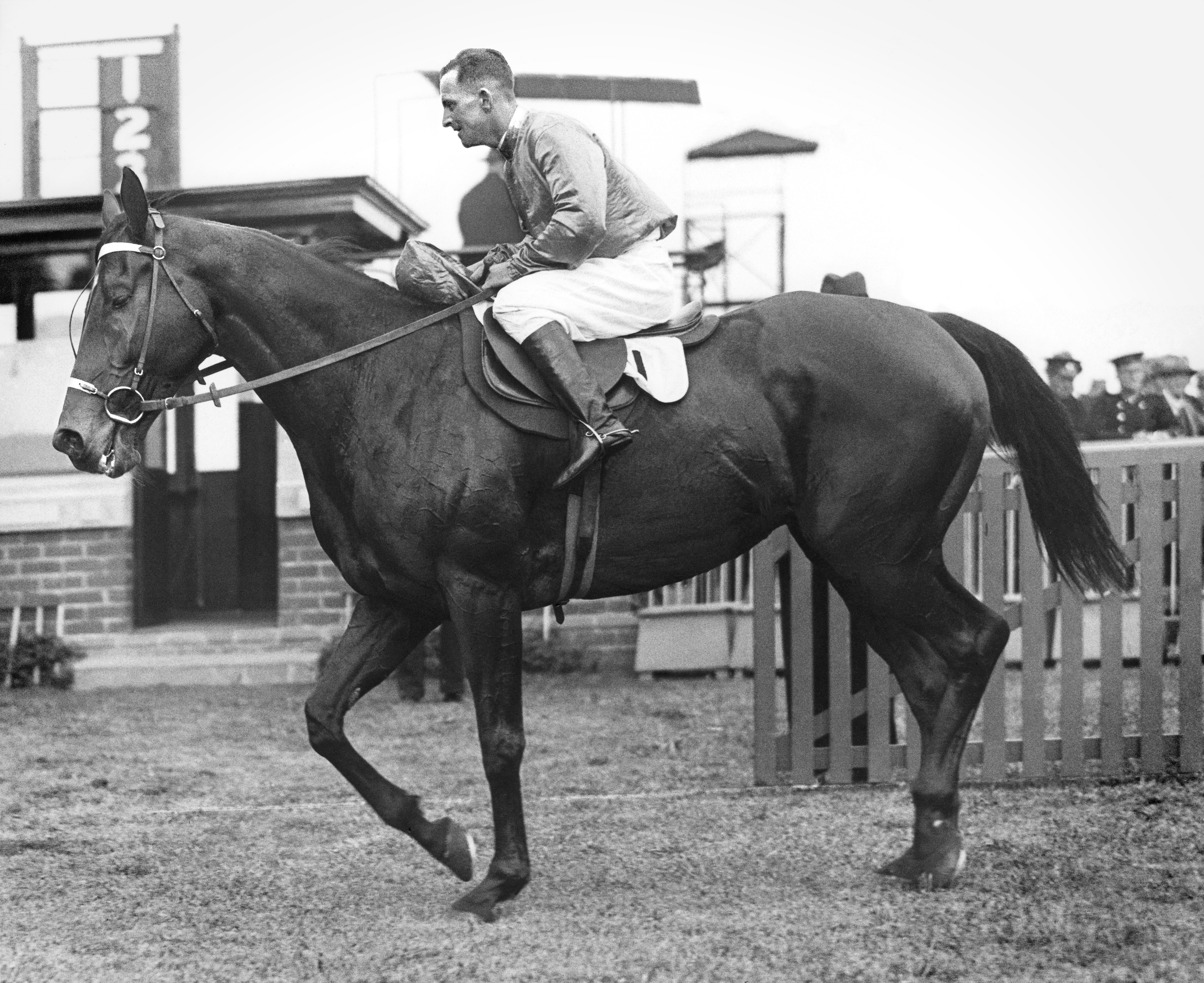
Amounis, 1927 winner

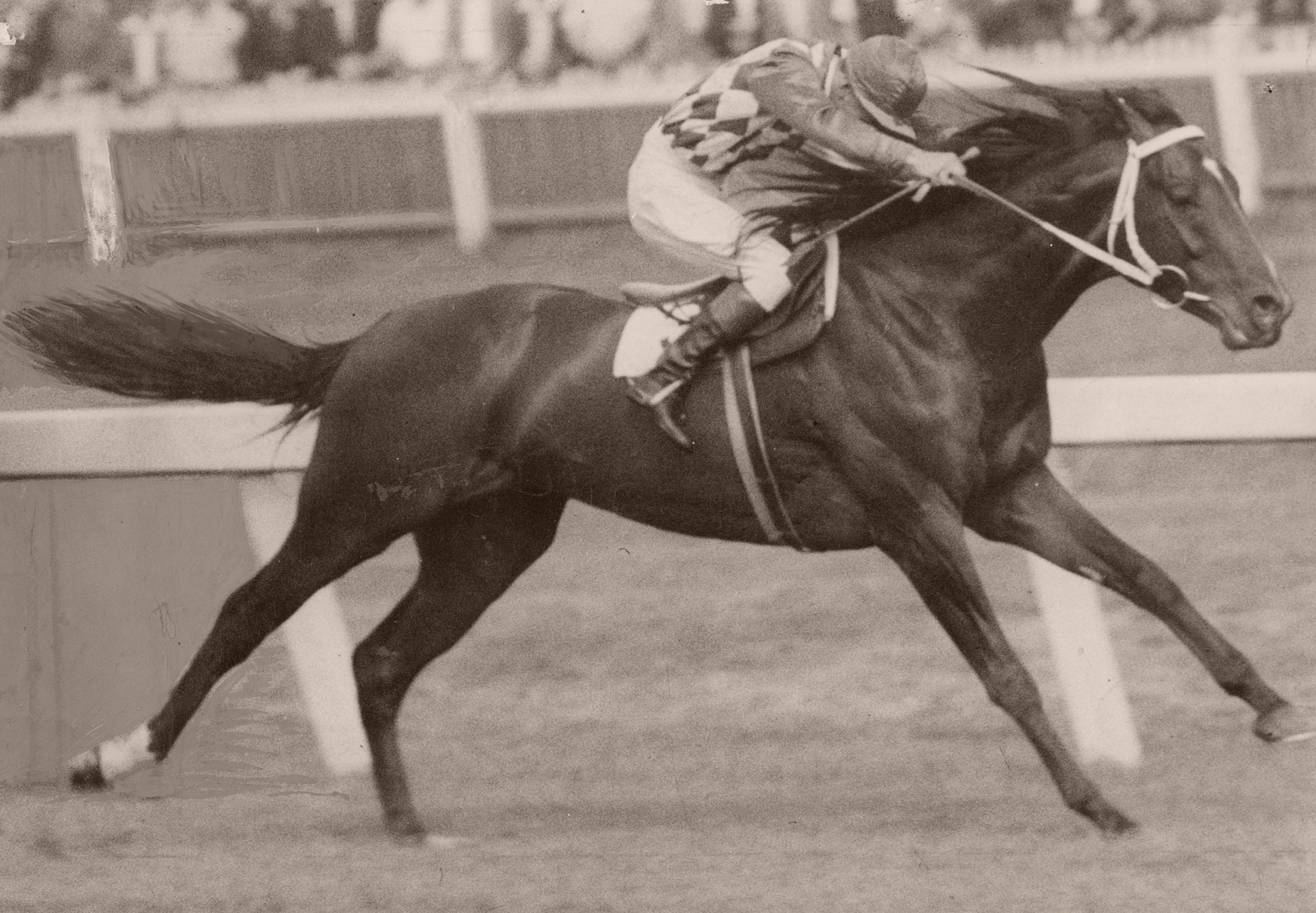
Comic Court, 1951 winner

== Winners ==
the following are past winners of the race.

- 2026 - Autumn Glow
- 2025 - Via Sistina
- 2024 - Think It Over
- 2023 - Anamoe
- 2022 - Verry Elleegant
- 2021 - Verry Elleegant
- 2020 - Te Akau Shark
- 2019 - Winx
- 2018 - Winx
- 2017 - Winx
- 2016 - Winx
- 2015 - Contributor
- 2014 - Boban
- 2013 - Shoot Out
- 2012 - Shoot Out
- 2011 - Danleigh
- 2010 - Theseo
- 2009 - Tuesday Joy
- 2008 - Casino Prince
- 2007 - He's No Pie Eater
- 2006 - Desert War
- 2005 - Grand Armee
- 2004 - Starcraft
- 2003 - Lonhro
- 2002 - Tie the Knot
- 2001 - Tie the Knot
- 2000 - Tie the Knot
- 1999 - Tie the Knot
- 1998 - Encounter
- 1997 - Octagonal
- 1996 - Juggler
- 1995 - Pharaoh
- 1994 - Telesto
- 1993 - Kingston Bay
- 1992 - Super Impose
- 1991 - Super Impose
- 1990 - Dr. Grace
- 1989 - Flotilla
- 1988 - Wong
- 1987 - Our Waverley Star
- 1986 - Heat Of The Moment
- 1985 - Rising Prince
- 1984 - Emancipation
- 1983 - Dalmacia
- 1982 - Vivacite
- 1981 - Prince Ruling
- 1980 - Embasadora
- 1979 - Leonotis
- 1978 - Grey Affair
- 1977 - In Pursuit
- 1976 - Taras Bulba
- 1975 - Apollo Eleven
- 1974 - Igloo
- 1973 - Apollo Eleven
- 1972 - Latin Knight
- 1971 - Gay Icarus
- 1970 - Great Exploits
- 1969 - Rain Lover
- 1968 - General Command
- 1967 - Striking Force
- 1966 - Prince Grant
- 1965 - Bon Filou
- 1964 - Maidenhead
- 1963 - The Dip
- 1962 - Sky High
- 1961 - Valerius
- 1960 - Tulloch
- 1959 - Caesar
- 1958 - Tulloch
- 1957 - Mac's Amber
- 1956 - Somerset Fair
- 1955 - Carioca
- 1954 - Gallant Archer
- 1953 - Carioca
- 1952 - Delta
- 1951 - Comic Court
- 1950 - Carbon Copy
- 1949 - Carbon Copy
- 1948 - Fresh Boy
- 1947 - Vigaro
- 1946 - Bernborough
- 1945 - Katanga
- 1944 - Katanga
- 1943 - Veiled Threat
- 1942 - race not held
- 1941 - Tranquil Star
- 1940 - Reading
- 1939 - Defaulter
- 1938 - John Wilkes
- 1937 - Lough Neagh
- 1936 - Lough Neagh
- 1935 - Rogilla
- 1934 - Silver Scorn
- 1933 - Lough Neagh
- 1932 - Ammon Ra
- 1931 - Chide
- 1930 - Phar Lap
- 1929 - Strephon
- 1928 - Limerick
- 1927 - Amounis
- 1926 - Windbag
- 1925 - Wallace Mortlake

== See also ==
- List of Australian Group races
- Group races
