= Apollo Eleven (horse) =

New Zealand-bred Thoroughbred racehorse

- Sire: Cyrus
- Grandsire: Darius
- Dam: Lady Rizzio
- Damsire: Treasure HUnt
- Sex: Stallion
- Foaled: 1967
- Country: New Zealand
- Colour: Grey
- Breeder: J D Foote
- Trainer: Merv Ritchie
- Record: 87: 12-9-7

Major wins
- Auckland Cup (1973); Chipping Norton Stakes (1973, 1975); Queen Elizabeth Stakes (1973); Sydney Cup (1973); The Tancred (1973)

Apollo Eleven was a New Zealand thoroughbred racehorse.

== Background ==
Apollo Eleven was foaled in 1967 by Cyrus out of Lady Rizzio.

== Racing career ==
He is notable for winning the following races:

- the 1973 Tancred Stakes.
- the 1973 Auckland Cup.
- the 1973 Chipping Norton Stakes.
- the 1973 Queen Elizabeth Stakes
- the 1973 Sydney Cup.
- the 1975 Chipping Norton Stakes.

Apollo Eleven held the distinction for the fastest recorded time in 3 minutes and 19 seconds, equalled by Just A Dancer in 1991.

He returned to Sydney in 1975 to win the Chipping Norton Stakes but was suspected of being poisoned when travelling to the racecourse to compete for the Sydney Cup in 1975 by Sydney-based crime syndicates.

== Pedigree ==
Pedigree of Apollo Eleven
Sire Cyrus 1959	Darius 1951	Dante	Nearco
Sire Cyrus 1959	Darius 1951	Dante	Rosy Legend
Sire Cyrus 1959	Darius 1951	Yasna	Dastur
Sire Cyrus 1959	Darius 1951	Yasna	Ariadne
Sire Cyrus 1959	Good Line 1954	Owen Tudor	Hyperion
Sire Cyrus 1959	Good Line 1954	Owen Tudor	Mary Tudor
Sire Cyrus 1959	Good Line 1954	Best Seller	Fair Trial
Sire Cyrus 1959	Good Line 1954	Best Seller	Serial
Dam Lady Rizzio 1947	Treasure Hunt 1940	Bahram	Blandford
Dam Lady Rizzio 1947	Treasure Hunt 1940	Bahram	Friar's Daughter
Dam Lady Rizzio 1947	Treasure Hunt 1940	Amuse	Phalaris
Dam Lady Rizzio 1947	Treasure Hunt 1940	Amuse	Gesture
Dam Lady Rizzio 1947	Broieden 1941	Broiefort	Blandford
Dam Lady Rizzio 1947	Broieden 1941	Broiefort	Innoxa
Dam Lady Rizzio 1947	Broieden 1941	Trimden	Tea Tray
Dam Lady Rizzio 1947	Broieden 1941	Trimden	Agnestes
